= Sri Lanka at the Cricket World Cup =

Sri Lankan cricket team history at ICC Men's World Cup Events

The Sri Lanka cricket team has reached the World Cup final three times. Winning in 1996 under the leadership of Arjuna Ranatunga and finishing as runners-up in the 2007 and 2011. Sri Lanka has also reached the semi-final at the 2003 World Cup and the quarter-final at the 2015 World Cup.

== Cricket World Cup records ==
Key
Champions
Runners-up
Semi-finals
Host

Cricket World Cup record									Qualification record				
Year	Round	Position	Pld	W	L	T	NR	Captain	Pld	W	L	T	NR
(England) 1975	Group stage	7/8	3	0	3	0	0	Anura Tennekoon	No qualifiers held				
(England) 1979	Group stage	5/8	3	1	1	0	1	Anura Tennekoon	6	4	1	0	1
(England) (Wales) 1983	Group stage	7/8	6	1	5	0	0	Duleep Mendis	Did not enter (qualified directly as full member)				
(India) (Pakistan) 1987	Group stage	7/8	6	0	6	0	0	Duleep Mendis	Did not enter (qualified directly as full member)				
(Australia) (New Zealand) 1992	Group stage	8/9	8	2	5	0	1	Aravinda de Silva	Did not enter (qualified directly as full member)				
(India) (Pakistan) (Sri Lanka) 1996	Champions	1/12	8	8	0	0	0	Arjuna Ranatunga	Did not enter (qualified directly as full member)				
(England) (Republic of Ireland) (Netherlands) (Scotland) (Wales) 1999	Group Stage	10/12	5	2	3	0	0	Arjuna Ranatunga	Did not enter (qualified directly as full member)				
(South Africa) (Kenya) (Zimbabwe) 2003	Semi-finals	4/14	10	5	4	1	0	Sanath Jayasuriya	Did not enter (qualified directly as full member)				
(Cricket West Indies) 2007	Runners-up	2/16	11	8	3	0	0	Mahela Jayawardene	Did not enter (qualified directly as full member)				
(Bangladesh) (India) (Sri Lanka) 2011	Runners-up	2/14	9	6	2	0	1	Kumar Sangakkara	Did not enter (qualified directly as full member)				
(Australia) (New Zealand) 2015	Quarter-finals	4/14	7	4	3	0	0	Angelo Mathews	Did not enter (qualified directly as full member)				
(England) (Wales) 2019	Group Stage	6/10	9	3	4	0	2	Dimuth Karunaratne	Qualified via ODI rankings (8th place)				
(India) 2023	League stage	9/10	9	2	7	0	0	Dasun Shanaka (Note: Dasun Shanaka was initially named captain in the squad announcement. However, after two matches he was ruled out due to injury, and Kusal Mendis took over the captaincy.)	32	15	14	0	3
Total	13/13	1 Title	94	42	46	1	5	—N/a	38	19	15	0	4

=== Team wise record ===
Opponent	Matches	Won	Lost	Tied	NR	Win %	First played
Afghanistan	3	2	1	0	0	66.67	22 February 2015
Australia	12	2	9	0	1	16.67	11 June 1975
Bangladesh	5	3	1	0	1	60.00	14 February 2003
Bermuda	1	1	0	0	0	100.00	15 March 2007
Canada	2	2	0	0	0	100.00	19 February 2003
England	12	6	6	0	0	50.00	11 June 1983
India	10	4	5	0	1	40.00	18 June 1979
Ireland	1	1	0	0	0	100.00	18 April 2007
Kenya	4	3	1	0	0	75.00	6 March 1996
Netherlands	1	1	0	0	0	100.00	21 October 2023
New Zealand	12	6	6	0	0	54.54	9 June 1979
Pakistan	9	0	8	0	1	0.00	14 June 1975
Scotland	1	1	0	0	0	100.00	11 March 2015
South Africa	7	1	5	1	0	14.29	2 March 1992
West Indies	9	4	4	0	1	44.44	7 June 1975
Zimbabwe	5	5	0	0	0	100.00	23 February 1992
Total	94	42	46	1	5	45.21%	—
Source: ESPNcricinfo Last updated: 7 November 2023.

== Tournament records ==
=== 1975 Cricket World Cup ===
Squad

- Anura Tennekoon (c)
- Ranjit Fernando (wk)
- Bandula Warnapura
- Sunil Wettimuny
- Duleep Mendis
- Lalith Kaluperuma
- Ajit de Silva
- Somachandra de Silva
- Tony Opatha
- Mevan Pieris
- David Heyn
- Michael Tissera
- Anura Ranasinghe
- Dennis Chanmugam

Results

Group stage (Group B)				Semifinal	Final	Overall Result
Opposition Result	Opposition Result	Opposition Result	Rank	Opposition Result	Opposition Result	Overall Result
West Indies; L by 9 wickets	Australia; L by 52 runs	Pakistan; L by 192 runs	4	Did not advance		Group stage

Scorecards

Group stage (Group B)

7 June 1975
Scorecard

Sri Lanka; 86 (37.2 overs)	v	West Indies; 87/1 (20.4 overs)
Somachandra de Silva 21 (54); Bernard Julien 2/16 (12 overs)		Roy Fredericks 33 (38); Somachandra de Silva 1/33 (8 overs)

West Indies won by 9 wickets
Old Trafford, Manchester
Umpires: Lloyd Budd (Eng) and Arthur Jepson (Eng)
Player of the match: Bernard Julien (WI)

11 June 1975
Scorecard

Australia; 328/5 (60 overs)	v	Sri Lanka; 276/4 (60 overs)
Alan Turner 101 (113); Somachandra de Silva 2/60 (12 overs)		Sunil Wettimuny 53 (102); Ian Chappell 2/14 (4 overs)

Australia won by 52 runs
The Oval, London
Umpires: Lloyd Budd (Eng) and Arthur Fagg (Eng)
Player of the match: Alan Turner (AUS)

14 June 1975
Scorecard

Pakistan; 330/6 (60 overs)	v	Sri Lanka; 138 (50.1 overs)
Zaheer Abbas 97 (89); Tony Opatha 2/67 (12 overs)		Anura Tennekoon 30 (36); Imran Khan 3/15 (7.1 overs)

Pakistan won by 192 runs
Trent Bridge, Nottingham
Umpires: Arthur Jepson (Eng) and Tom Spencer (Eng)
Player of the match: Zaheer Abbas (Pak)

=== 1979 Cricket World Cup ===
Squad

- Anura Tennekoon (c)
- Bandula Warnapura Vice-captain
- Sunil Jayasinghe (wk)
- Duleep Mendis
- Roy Dias
- Ranjan Madugalle
- Sudath Pasqual
- Ajit de Silva
- Somachandra de Silva
- Stanley de Silva
- Tony Opatha
- Ranjan Gunatilleke
- David Heyn
- Mahes Goonatilleke

Results

Group stage (Group B)				Semifinal	Final	Overall Result
Opposition Result	Opposition Result	Opposition Result	Rank	Opposition Result	Opposition Result	Overall Result
New Zealand; L by 9 wickets	West Indies; Match abandoned	India; W by 47 runs	3	Did not advance		Group stage

Scorecards

Group stage (Group B)

9 June 1979
Scorecard

Sri Lanka; 189 (56.5 overs)	v	New Zealand; 190/1 (47.4 overs)
Anura Tennekoon 59 (96); Brian McKechnie 3/25 (10.5 overs)		Glenn Turner 83 (143); Ajit de Silva 1/39 (12 overs)

New Zealand won by 9 wickets
Trent Bridge, Nottingham, England
Umpires: Lloyd Budd (Eng) and Ken Palmer (Eng)
Player of the match: Geoff Howarth (NZ)

13 June 1979
Scorecard

Sri Lanka	v	West Indies

Match abandoned without a ball bowled
The Oval, London, England
Umpires: unknown
Player of the match: no award

- No toss
- 2 reserve days used, no play due to heavy rain.

16, 18 June 1979
Scorecard

Sri Lanka; 238/5 (60 overs)	v	India; 191 (54.1 overs)
Sunil Wettimuny 67 (120); Mohinder Amarnath 3/40 (12 overs)		Dilip Vengsarkar 36 (57); Somachandra de Silva 3/29 (11 overs)

Sri Lanka won by 47 runs
Old Trafford, Manchester, England
Umpires: Ken Palmer (Eng) and Alan Whitehead (Eng)
Player of the match: Duleep Mendis (SL)

- Reserve day used

=== 1983 Cricket World Cup ===
Squad

- Duleep Mendis (c)
- Guy de Alwis (wk)
- Brendon Kuruppu (wk)
- Sidath Wettimuny
- Roy Dias
- Ranjan Madugalle
- Arjuna Ranatunga
- Athula Samarasekera
- Rumesh Ratnayake
- Vinothen John
- Ashantha de Mel
- Somachandra de Silva
- Susil Fernando
- Granville de Silva

Results

Group stage (Group A)							Semifinal	Final	Overall Result
Opposition Result	Opposition Result	Opposition Result	Opposition Result	Opposition Result	Opposition Result	Rank	Opposition Result	Opposition Result	Overall Result
Pakistan; L by 50 runs	England; L by 47 runs	New Zealand; L by 5 wickets	Pakistan; L by 11 runs	New Zealand; W by 3 wickets	England; L by 9 wickets	4	Did not advance		Group stage

Scorecards

Group stage (Group A)

9 June 1983
Scorecard

Pakistan; 338/5 (60 overs)	v	Sri Lanka; 288/9 (60 overs)
Zaheer Abbas 82 (81); Ashantha de Mel 2/69 (12 overs)		Brendon Kuruppu 72 (101); Sarfraz Nawaz 3/40 (12 overs)

Pakistan won by 50 runs
St Helen's, Swansea, Wales
Umpires: Ken Palmer and David Shepherd
Player of the match: Mohsin Khan

11 June 1983
Scorecard

England; 333/9 (60 overs)	v	Sri Lanka; 286 (58 overs)
David Gower 130 (120); Ashantha de Mel 2/62 (12 overs)		Guy de Alwis 58 (51); Vic Marks 5/39 (12 overs)

England won by 47 runs
County Ground, Taunton, England
Umpires: Mervyn Kitchen and Ken Palmer
Player of the match: David Gower

13 June 1983
Scorecard

Sri Lanka; 206 (56.1 overs)	v	New Zealand; 209/5 (39.2 overs)
Ranjan Madugalle 60 (87); Richard Hadlee 5/25 (10.1 overs)		Geoff Howarth 76 (79); Ashantha de Mel 2/30 (8 overs)

New Zealand won by 5 wickets
County Ground, Bristol, England
Umpires: Dickie Bird and David Shepherd
Player of the match: Richard Hadlee

9 June 1983
Scorecard

Pakistan; 338/5 (60 overs)	v	Sri Lanka; 288/9 (60 overs)
Zaheer Abbas 82 (81); Ashantha de Mel 2/69 (12 overs)		Brendon Kuruppu 72 (101); Sarfraz Nawaz 3/40 (12 overs)

Pakistan won by 50 runs
St Helen's, Swansea, Wales
Umpires: Ken Palmer and David Shepherd
Player of the match: Mohsin Khan

18 June 1983
Scorecard

New Zealand; 181 (58.2 overs)	v	Sri Lanka; 184/7 (52.5 overs)
Martin Snedden 40 (55); Ashantha de Mel 5/32 (12 overs)		Roy Dias 64* (101); Martin Snedden 2/58 (10.5 overs)

Sri Lanka won by 3 wickets
County Ground, Derby, England
Umpires: David Constant and Barrie Leadbeater
Player of the match: Ashantha de Mel

11 June 1983
Scorecard

England; 333/9 (60 overs)	v	Sri Lanka; 286 (58 overs)
David Gower 130 (120); Ashantha de Mel 2/62 (12 overs)		Guy de Alwis 58 (51); Vic Marks 5/39 (12 overs)

England won by 47 runs
County Ground, Taunton, England
Umpires: Mervyn Kitchen and Ken Palmer
Player of the match: David Gower

=== 1987 Cricket World Cup ===
Squad

- Duleep Mendis (c)
- Aravinda de Silva
- Brendon Kuruppu (wk)
- Sridharan Jeganathan
- Roy Dias
- Ranjan Madugalle
- Arjuna Ranatunga
- Roshan Mahanama
- Athula Samarasekera
- Asanka Gurusinha
- Rumesh Ratnayake
- Vinothen John
- Ashantha de Mel
- Ravi Ratnayeke
- Don Anurasiri

Results

Group stage (Group B)							Semifinal	Final	Overall Result
Opposition Result	Opposition Result	Opposition Result	Opposition Result	Opposition Result	Opposition Result	Rank	Opposition Result	Opposition Result	Overall Result
Pakistan; L by 15 runs	West Indies; L by 191 runs	England; L by 108 runs	West Indies; L by 191 runs	Pakistan; L by 15 runs	England; L by 8 wickets	4	Did not advance		Group stage

Scorecards

Group stage (Group B)

8 October 1987
Scorecard

Pakistan; 267/6 (50 overs)	v	Sri Lanka; 252 (49.2 overs)
Javed Miandad 103 (100); Ravi Ratnayeke 2/47 (9 overs)		Roshan Mahanama 89 (117); Abdul Qadir 2/30 (10 overs)

Pakistan won by 15 runs
Niaz Stadium, Hyderabad, Pakistan
Umpires: V. K. Ramaswamy (India) and Steve Woodward (New Zealand)
Player of the match: Javed Miandad (Pakistan)

13 October 1987
Scorecard

West Indies; 360/4 (50 overs)	v	Sri Lanka; 169/4 (50 overs)
Viv Richards 181 (125); Ravi Ratnayeke 2/68 (8 overs)		Arjuna Ranatunga 52 (93); Carl Hooper 2/39 (10 overs)

West Indies won by 191 runs
National Stadium, Karachi, Pakistan
Umpires: V. K. Ramaswamy (India) and Steve Woodward (New Zealand)
Player of the match: Viv Richards (West Indies)

17 October 1987
Scorecard

England; 296/4 (50 overs)	v	Sri Lanka; 158/8 (45 overs)
Graham Gooch 84 (100); Ravi Ratnayeke 2/62 (9 overs)		Arjuna Ranatunga 40 (67); John Emburey 2/26 (10 overs)

England won by 108 runs
Arbab Niaz Stadium, Peshawar, Pakistan
Umpires: V. K. Ramaswamy (India) and Steve Woodward (New Zealand)
Player of the match: Allan Lamb (England)

- Rain interrupted Sri Lankan innings. SL's target was reduced to 267 in 45 overs by the Average Run Rate method.

13 October 1987
Scorecard

West Indies; 360/4 (50 overs)	v	Sri Lanka; 169/4 (50 overs)
Viv Richards 181 (125); Ravi Ratnayeke 2/68 (8 overs)		Arjuna Ranatunga 52 (93); Carl Hooper 2/39 (10 overs)

West Indies won by 191 runs
National Stadium, Karachi, Pakistan
Umpires: V. K. Ramaswamy (India) and Steve Woodward (New Zealand)
Player of the match: Viv Richards (West Indies)

8 October 1987
Scorecard

Pakistan; 267/6 (50 overs)	v	Sri Lanka; 252 (49.2 overs)
Javed Miandad 103 (100); Ravi Ratnayeke 2/47 (9 overs)		Roshan Mahanama 89 (117); Abdul Qadir 2/30 (10 overs)

Pakistan won by 15 runs
Niaz Stadium, Hyderabad, Pakistan
Umpires: V. K. Ramaswamy (India) and Steve Woodward (New Zealand)
Player of the match: Javed Miandad (Pakistan)

30 October 1987
Scorecard

Sri Lanka; 218/7 (50 overs)	v	England; 219/2 (41.2 overs)
Roy Dias 80 (105); Eddie Hemmings 3/57 (10 overs)		Graham Gooch 61 (79); Sridharan Jeganathan 2/45 (10 overs)

England won by 8 wickets
Nehru Stadium, Poona, India
Umpires: David Archer (West Indies) and Khizer Hayat (Pakistan)
Player of the match: Graham Gooch (England)

=== 1992 Cricket World Cup ===
Squad

- Aravinda de Silva (c)
- Hashan Tillakaratne (wk)
- Roshan Mahanama
- Athula Samarasekera
- Asanka Gurusinha
- Sanath Jayasuriya
- Arjuna Ranatunga
- Ranjan Madugalle
- Pramodya Wickramasinghe
- Chandika Hathurusingha
- Graeme Labrooy
- Don Anurasiri
- Kapila Wijegunawardene
- Ruwan Kalpage
- Champaka Ramanayake

Results

Round-robin stage									Semifinal	Final	Overall Result
Opposition Result	Opposition Result	Opposition Result	Opposition Result	Opposition Result	Opposition Result	Opposition Result	Opposition Result	Rank	Opposition Result	Opposition Result	Overall Result
Zimbabwe; W by 3 wickets	New Zealand; L by 6 wickets	India; No result	South Africa; W by 3 wickets	Australia; L by 7 wickets	England; L by 106 runs	West Indies; L by 91 runs	Pakistan; L by 4 wickets	8	Did not advance		Round-robin stage

Scorecards

Round-robin stage

23 February 1992
Scorecard

Zimbabwe; 312/4 (50 overs)	v	Sri Lanka; 313/7 (49.2 overs)
Andy Flower 115* (152); Pramodya Wickramasinghe 2/50 (10 overs)		Arjuna Ranatunga 88* (61); Eddo Brandes 3/70 (10 overs)

Sri Lanka won by 3 wickets
Pukekura Park, New Plymouth, New Zealand
Umpires: Piloo Reporter (India) and Steve Woodward (New Zealand)
Player of the match: Andy Flower (Zimbabwe)

25 February 1992
Scorecard

Sri Lanka; 206/9 (50 overs)	v	New Zealand; 210/4 (48.2 overs)
Roshan Mahanama 80 (131); Willie Watson 3/37 (10 overs)		Ken Rutherford 65* (71); Ruwan Kalpage 2/33 (10 overs)

New Zealand won by 6 wickets
Trust Bank Park, Hamilton, New Zealand
Umpires: Piloo Reporter (India) and David Shepherd (England)
Player of the match: Ken Rutherford (New Zealand)

28 February 1992
Scorecard

India; 1/0 (0.2 overs)	v	Sri Lanka

No result
Ray Mitchell Oval, Mackay, Australia
Umpires: Ian Robinson (Zimbabwe) and David Shepherd (England)

- The match was initially reduced to 20 overs a side due to rain. A helicopter was used to dry the pitch but as play began rain fell again, washing out the game.

2 March 1992
Scorecard

South Africa; 195 (50 overs)	v	Sri Lanka; 198/7 (49.5 overs)
Peter Kirsten 47 (81); Don Anurasiri 3/41 (10 overs)		Roshan Mahanama 68 (121); Allan Donald 3/42 (9.5 overs)

Sri Lanka won by 3 wickets
Basin Reserve, Wellington, New Zealand
Umpires: Khizer Hayat (Pakistan) and Steve Woodward (New Zealand)
Player of the match: Arjuna Ranatunga (Sri Lanka)

7 March 1992
Scorecard

Sri Lanka; 189/9 (50 overs)	v	Australia; 190/3 (44 overs)
Aravinda de Silva 62 (83); Peter Taylor 2/34 (10 overs)		Geoff Marsh 60 (113); Pramodya Wickramasinghe 2/29 (10 overs)

Australia won by 7 wickets
Adelaide Oval, Adelaide, Australia
Umpires: Piloo Reporter (India) and Ian Robinson (Zimbabwe)
Player of the match: Tom Moody (Australia)

9 March 1992
Scorecard

England; 280/9 (50 overs)	v	Sri Lanka; 174 (44 overs)
Neil Fairbrother 63 (70); Asanka Gurusinha 2/67 (10 overs)		Arjuna Ranatunga 36 (51); Chris Lewis 4/30 (8 overs)

England won by 106 runs
Eastern Oval, Ballarat, Australia
Umpires: Khizer Hayat (Pakistan) and Piloo Reporter (India)
Player of the match: Chris Lewis (England)

13 March 1992
Scorecard

West Indies; 268/8 (50 overs)	v	Sri Lanka; 177/9 (50 overs)
Phil Simmons 110 (125); Chandika Hathurusingha 4/57 (8 overs)		Athula Samarasekera 40 (41); Carl Hooper 2/19 (10 overs)

West Indies won by 91 runs
Berri Oval, Berri, Australia
Umpires: David Shepherd (England) and Steve Woodward (New Zealand)
Player of the match: Phil Simmons (West Indies)

- Sri Lanka were eliminated as a result of this match.

15 March 1992
Scorecard

Sri Lanka; 212/6 (50 overs)	v	Pakistan; 216/6 (49.1 overs)
Aravinda de Silva 43 (56); Mushtaq Ahmed 2/43 (10 overs)		Javed Miandad 57 (84); Champaka Ramanayake 2/37 (10 overs)

Pakistan won by 4 wickets
WACA Ground, Perth, Australia
Umpires: Karl Liebenberg (South Africa) and Peter McConnell (Australia)
Player of the match: Javed Miandad (Pakistan)

=== 1996 Cricket World Cup ===
Squad

- Arjuna Ranatunga (c)
- Aravinda de Silva (vc)
- Sanath Jayasuriya
- Romesh Kaluwitharana (wk)
- Asanka Gurusinha
- Hashan Tillakaratne
- Roshan Mahanama
- Pramodya Wickramasinghe
- Chaminda Vaas
- Muttiah Muralitharan
- Kumar Dharmasena
- Upul Chandana
- Marvan Atapattu
- Ravindra Pushpakumara

Results

Group stage (Group A)						Quarterfinal	Semifinal	Final	Overall Result
Opposition Result	Opposition Result	Opposition Result	Opposition Result	Opposition Result	Rank	Opposition Result	Opposition Result	Opposition Result	Overall Result
Australia; W by walkover	Zimbabwe; W by 6 wickets	West Indies; W by walkover	India; W by 6 wickets	Kenya; W by 144 runs	1	England; W by 5 wickets	India; W by default	Australia; W by 7 wickets	Winners

Scorecards

Group stage (Group A)

17 February
Scorecard

Sri Lanka	v	Australia

Sri Lanka won by a walkover
R. Premadasa Stadium, Colombo
Umpires: Cyril Mitchley (SA) and Mahboob Shah (Pak)

- No toss.
- Australia forfeited the match due to safety concerns, and were in Mumbai at the time of the match.

21 February
Scorecard

Zimbabwe; 228/6 (50 overs)	v	Sri Lanka; 229/4 (37 overs)
Alistair Campbell 75 (102); Chaminda Vaas 2/30 (10 overs)		Aravinda de Silva 91 (86); Heath Streak 3/60 (10 overs)

Sri Lanka won by 6 wickets
Sinhalese Sports Club Ground, Colombo
Umpires: Steve Dunne (NZ) and Mahboob Shah (Pak)
Player of the match: Aravinda de Silva (SL)

- Zimbabwe won the toss and elected to bat.

26 February
Scorecard

Sri Lanka	v	West Indies

Sri Lanka won by a walkover
Premadasa Stadium, Colombo
Umpires: V. K. Ramaswamy (Ind) and Mahboob Shah (Pak)

- No toss.
- West Indies forfeited the match due to safety concerns.

2 March
Scorecard

India; 271/3 (50 overs)	v	Sri Lanka; 272/4 (48.4 overs)
Sachin Tendulkar 137 (137); Ravindra Pushpakumara 1/53 (8 overs)		Sanath Jayasuriya 79 (76); Anil Kumble 2/39 (10 overs)

Sri Lanka won by 6 wickets
Feroz Shah Kotla, Delhi
Umpires: Cyril Mitchley (SA) and Ian Robinson (Zim)
Player of the match: Sanath Jayasuriya (SL)

- Sri Lanka won the toss and elected to field.
- Manoj Prabhakar played his last ODI game.

6 March
Scorecard

Sri Lanka; 398/5 (50 overs)	v	Kenya; 254/7 (50 overs)
Aravinda de Silva 145 (115); Tito Odumbe 2/34 (5 overs)		Steve Tikolo 96 (95); Arjuna Ranatunga 2/31 (5 overs)

Sri Lanka won by 144 runs
Asgiriya Stadium, Kandy
Umpires: Steve Dunne (NZ) and V. K. Ramaswamy (Ind)
Player of the match: Aravinda de Silva (SL)

- Kenya won the toss and elected to field.
- Sri Lanka's total of 398/5 surpassed England's 363/7 against Pakistan in 1992 as the highest score in all ODIs. The record stood until 12 March 2006, when both Australia and South Africa broke it in the same match. It remained a World Cup record until the 2007 tournament, when India scored 413/5 against Bermuda.

Knockout stage

Quarter-final 1
9 March
Scorecard

England; 235/8 (50 overs)	v	Sri Lanka; 236/5 (40.4 overs)
Phil DeFreitas 67 (64); Kumar Dharmasena 2/30 (10 overs)		Sanath Jayasuriya 82 (44); Dermot Reeve 1/14 (4 overs)

Sri Lanka won by 5 wickets
Iqbal Stadium, Faisalabad
Umpires: Mahboob Shah and Ian Robinson
Player of the match: Sanath Jayasuriya (SL)

- England won the toss and elected to bat first.

Semi-final 1
13 March
Scorecard

Sri Lanka; 251/8 (50 overs)	v	India; 120/8 (34.1 overs)
Aravinda de Silva 66 (47); Javagal Srinath 3/34 (7 overs)		Sachin Tendulkar 65 (88); Sanath Jayasuriya 3/12 (7 overs)

Sri Lanka won by default
Eden Gardens, Calcutta
Umpires: Steve Dunne and Cyril Mitchley
Player of the match: Aravinda de Silva (SL)

- India won the toss and elected to field.
- The match was awarded to Sri Lanka by match referee Clive Lloyd when play could not be continued due to the rioting crowd.
- Sri Lanka qualified for the final for first time.

Final
17 March (D/N)
Scorecard

Australia; 241/7 (50 overs)	v	Sri Lanka; 245/3 (46.2 overs)
Mark Taylor 74 (83); Aravinda de Silva 3/42 (9 overs)		Aravinda de Silva 107* (124); Damien Fleming 1/43 (6 overs)

Sri Lanka won by 7 wickets
Gaddafi Stadium, Lahore
Umpires: Steve Bucknor and David Shepherd
Player of the match: Aravinda de Silva (SL)

- Sri Lanka won the toss and elected to field.

=== 1999 Cricket World Cup ===
Squad

- Arjuna Ranatunga (c)
- Aravinda de Silva (vc)
- Sanath Jayasuriya
- Romesh Kaluwitharana (wk)
- Marvan Atapattu
- Roshan Mahanama
- Mahela Jayawardene
- Ruwan Kalpage
- Upul Chandana
- Chaminda Vaas
- Eric Upashantha
- Pramodya Wickramasinghe
- Hashan Tillakaratne
- Muttiah Muralitharan
- Chandika Hathurusingha

Results

Pool stage (Pool A)						Super Six		Semifinal	Final	Overall Result
Opposition Result	Opposition Result	Opposition Result	Opposition Result	Opposition Result	Rank	Opposition Result	Rank	Opposition Result	Opposition Result	Overall Result
England; L by 8 wickets	South Africa; L by 89 runs	Zimbabwe; W by 4 wickets	India; L by 157 runs	Kenya; W by 45 runs	5	Did not advance				Pool stage

Scorecards

Pool stage (Pool A)

14 May 1999
Scorecard

Sri Lanka; 204 (48.4 overs)	v	England; 207/2 (46.5 overs)
Romesh Kaluwitharana 57 (66); Alan Mullally 4/37 (10 overs)		Alec Stewart 88 (146); Chaminda Vaas 1/27 (10 overs)

England won by 8 wickets
Lord's, London
Umpires: Rudi Koertzen (SA) and Srinivasaraghavan Venkataraghavan (Ind)
Player of the match: Alec Stewart (Eng)

- England won the toss and elected to field.

19 May 1999
Scorecard

South Africa; 199/9 (50 overs)	v	Sri Lanka; 110 (35.2 overs)
Lance Klusener 52* (45); Muttiah Muralitharan 3/25 (10 overs)		Roshan Mahanama 36 (71); Lance Klusener 3/21 (5.2 overs)

South Africa won by 89 runs
County Ground, Northampton
Umpires: Steve Bucknor (WI) and Steve Dunne (NZ)
Player of the match: Lance Klusener (SA)

- Sri Lanka won the toss and elected to field.

22 May 1999
Scorecard

Zimbabwe; 197/9 (50 overs)	v	Sri Lanka; 198/6 (46 overs)
Grant Flower 42 (69); Pramodya Wickramasinghe 3/30 (10 overs)		Marvan Atapattu 54 (90); Guy Whittall 3/35 (10 overs)

Sri Lanka won by 4 wickets
New Road, Worcester
Umpires: Steve Bucknor (WI) and David Shepherd (Eng)
Player of the match: Marvan Atapattu (SL)

- Sri Lanka won the toss and elected to field.

26 May 1999
Scorecard

India; 373/6 (50 overs)	v	Sri Lanka; 216 (42.3 overs)
Sourav Ganguly 183 (158); Pramodya Wickramasinghe 3/65 (10 overs)		Aravinda de Silva 56 (74); Robin Singh 5/31 (9.3 overs)

India won by 157 runs
County Ground, Taunton
Umpires: Steve Dunne (NZ) and David Shepherd (Eng)
Player of the match: Sourav Ganguly (Ind)

- Sri Lanka won the toss and elected to field.

30 May 1999
Scorecard

Sri Lanka; 275/8 (50 overs)	v	Kenya; 230/6 (50 overs)
Marvan Atapattu 52 (67); Thomas Odoyo 3/56 (10 overs)		Maurice Odumbe 82 (95); Chaminda Vaas 2/26 (7 overs)

Sri Lanka won by 45 runs
County Ground, Southampton
Umpires: Dave Orchard (SA) and Peter Willey (Eng)
Player of the match: Maurice Odumbe (Ken)

- Kenya won the toss and elected to field.

=== 2003 Cricket World Cup ===
Squad

- Sanath Jayasuriya (c)
- Marvan Atapattu
- Mahela Jayawardene
- Kumar Sangakkara (wk)
- Aravinda de Silva
- Russel Arnold
- Jehan Mubarak
- Hashan Tillakaratne
- Muttiah Muralitharan
- Chaminda Vaas
- Dilhara Fernando
- Pulasthi Gunaratne
- Avishka Gunawardene
- Prabath Nissanka
- Charitha Buddhika

Results

Pool stage (Pool B)							Super Sixes				Semifinal	Final	Overall Result
Opposition Result	Opposition Result	Opposition Result	Opposition Result	Opposition Result	Opposition Result	Rank	Opposition Result	Opposition Result	Opposition Result	Rank	Opposition Result	Opposition Result	Overall Result
New Zealand; W by 47 runs	Bangladesh; W by 10 wickets	Canada; W by 9 wickets	Kenya; L by 53 runs	West Indies; W by 6 runs	South Africa; Tied (D/L)	1	Australia; L by 96 runs	India; L by 183 runs	Zimbabwe; W by 74 runs	4	Australia; L by 48 runs (D/L)	Did not advance	Semi-finals

Scorecards

Pool stage (Pool B)

10 February 2003
Scorecard

Sri Lanka; 272/7 (50 overs)	v	New Zealand; 225 (45.3 overs)
Sanath Jayasuriya 120 (125); Nathan Astle 3/34 (7 overs)		Scott Styris 141 (125); Russel Arnold 3/47 (8.5 overs)

Sri Lanka won by 47 runs
Goodyear Park, Bloemfontein
Umpires: Neil Mallender (Eng) and Steve Bucknor (WI)
Player of the match: Sanath Jayasuriya (SL)

- New Zealand won the toss and elected to field.
- Points: Sri Lanka 4, New Zealand 0

14 February 2003
Scorecard

Bangladesh; 124 (31.1 overs)	v	Sri Lanka; 126/0 (21.1 overs)
Alok Kapali 32 (38); Chaminda Vaas 6/25 (9.1 overs)		Marvan Atapattu 69* (71)

Sri Lanka won by 10 wickets
City Oval, Pietermaritzburg
Umpires: Billy Bowden (NZ) and Russell Tiffin (Zim)
Player of the match: Chaminda Vaas (SL)

- Sri Lanka won the toss and elected to field.
- Points: Sri Lanka 4, Bangladesh 0
- Chaminda Vaas took a hat-trick with the first three balls of the match and became the third bowler to claim a World Cup hat-trick.
- Marvan Atapattu scored his 6,000th ODI run.

19 February 2003
Scorecard

Canada; 36 (18.4 overs)	v	Sri Lanka; 37/1 (4.4 overs)
Joe Harris 9 (13); Prabath Nissanka 4/12 (7 overs)		Marvan Atapattu 24* (14); Sanjayan Thuraisingam 1/22 (2.4 overs)

Sri Lanka won by 9 wickets
Boland Park, Paarl
Umpires: David Shepherd (Eng) and Neil Mallender (Eng)
Player of the match: Prabath Nissanka (SL)

- Sri Lanka won the toss and elected to field.
- Points: Sri Lanka 4, Canada 0
- Prabath Nissanka recorded his best bowling figures in ODIs.
- Canada posted the lowest ever score in a One Day International.
- Marvan Atapattu (SL) scored his 6,000th ODI run.

24 February 2003
Scorecard

Kenya; 210/9 (50 overs)	v	Sri Lanka; 157 (45 overs)
Kennedy Otieno 60 (88); Muttiah Muralitharan 4/28 (10 overs)		Aravinda de Silva 41 (53); Collins Obuya 5/24 (10 overs)

Kenya won by 53 runs
Nairobi Gymkhana Club, Nairobi
Umpires: Daryl Harper (Aus) and Russell Tiffin (Zim)
Player of the match: Collins Obuya (Ken)

- Sri Lanka won the toss and elected to field.
- Points: Kenya 4, Sri Lanka 0
- This was Kenya's first victory over Sri Lanka in ODIs.

28 February 2003 (D/N)
Scorecard

Sri Lanka; 228/6 (50 overs)	v	West Indies; 222/9 (50 overs)
Sanath Jayasuriya 66 (99); Vasbert Drakes 1/32 (10 overs)		Shivnarine Chanderpaul 65 (90); Chaminda Vaas 4/22 (10 overs)

Sri Lanka won by 6 runs
Newlands Cricket Ground, Cape Town
Umpires: Dave Orchard (SA) and S Venkataraghavan (Ind)
Player of the match: Chaminda Vaas (SL)

- Sri Lanka won the toss and elected to bat.
- Points: Sri Lanka 4, West Indies 0

3 March 2003 (D/N)
Scorecard

Sri Lanka; 268/9 (50 overs)	v	South Africa; 229/6 (45 overs)
Marvan Atapattu 124 (129); Jacques Kallis 3/41 (10 overs)		Herschelle Gibbs 73 (88); Aravinda de Silva 2/36 (8 overs)

Match tied (D/L method)
Kingsmead Cricket Ground, Durban
Umpires: S Venkataraghavan (Ind) and Steve Bucknor (WI)
Player of the match: Marvan Atapattu (SL)

- Sri Lanka won the toss and elected to bat.
- Points: Sri Lanka 2, South Africa 2

Super Sixes

7 March 2003
Scorecard

Australia; 319/5 (50 overs)	v	Sri Lanka; 223 (47.4 overs)
Ricky Ponting 114 (109); Dilhara Fernando 3/47 (9 overs)		Aravinda de Silva 92 (94); Brett Lee 3/52 (10 overs)

Australia won by 96 runs
Centurion Park, Centurion
Umpires: Billy Bowden (NZ) and David Shepherd (Eng)
Player of the match: Ricky Ponting (Aus)

- Australia won the toss and elected to bat.
- Points: Australia 4, Sri Lanka 0

10 March 2003
Scorecard

India; 292/6 (50 overs)	v	Sri Lanka; 109 (23 overs)
Sachin Tendulkar 97 (120); Muttiah Muralitharan 3/46 (10 overs)		Kumar Sangakkara 30 (33); Javagal Srinath 4/35 (9 overs)

India won by 183 runs
Wanderers Stadium, Johannesburg
Umpires: David Shepherd (Eng) and Simon Taufel (Aus)
Player of the match: Javagal Srinath (Ind)

- Sri Lanka won the toss and elected to field.
- Points: India 4, Sri Lanka 0

15 March 2003
Scorecard

Sri Lanka; 256/5 (50 overs)	v	Zimbabwe; 182 (41.5 overs)
Marvan Atapattu 103 (127); Heath Streak 2/40 (10 overs)		Craig Wishart 43 (71); Sanath Jayasuriya 3/30 (6 overs)

Sri Lanka won by 74 runs
Goodyear Park, Bloemfontein
Umpires: Brian Jerling (SA) and Rudi Koertzen (SA)
Player of the match: Marvan Atapattu (SL)

- Sri Lanka won the toss and elected to bat.
- Points: Sri Lanka 4, Zimbabwe 0
- Andy Flower played his last ODI game.

Knockout stage

Semi-final 1
18 March 2003
Scorecard

Australia; 212/7 (50 overs)	v	Sri Lanka; 123/7 (38.1 overs)
Andrew Symonds 91* (118); Chaminda Vaas 3/34 (10 overs)		Kumar Sangakkara 39* (70); Brett Lee 3/35 (8 overs)

Australia won by 48 runs (D/L method)
St George's Park Cricket Ground, Port Elizabeth
Umpires: Rudi Koertzen (SA) and David Shepherd (Eng)
Player of the match: Andrew Symonds (Aus)

- Australia won the toss and elected to bat.
- Rain interrupted the innings of Sri Lanka at 38.1 overs.
- Sri Lanka were 48 runs behind the DLS par score of 172 from 38.1 overs.

=== 2007 Cricket World Cup ===
Squad

- Mahela Jayawardene (c)
- Marvan Atapattu
- Sanath Jayasuriya
- Upul Tharanga
- Kumar Sangakkara
- Tillakaratne Dilshan
- Russel Arnold
- Chamara Silva
- Farveez Maharoof
- Chaminda Vaas
- Dilhara Fernando
- Lasith Malinga
- Nuwan Kulasekara
- Muttiah Muralitharan
- Malinga Bandara

Results

Group stage (Group B)				Super 8							Semifinal	Final	Overall Result
Opposition Result	Opposition Result	Opposition Result	Rank	Opposition Result	Opposition Result	Opposition Result	Opposition Result	Opposition Result	Opposition Result	Rank	Opposition Result	Opposition Result	Overall Result
Bermuda; W by 243 runs	Bangladesh; W by 198 runs (D/L)	India; W by 69 runs	1	South Africa; L by 1 wicket	West Indies; W by 113 runs	England; W by 2 runs	New Zealand; W by 6 wickets	Australia; L by 7 wickets	Ireland; W by 8 wickets	2	New Zealand; W by 81 runs	Australia; L by 53 runs (D/L)	Runners-up

Scorecards

Group stage (Group B)

15 March 2007
14:30 (D/N)
Scorecard

Sri Lanka; 321/6 (50 overs)	v	Bermuda; 78 (24.4 overs)
Mahela Jayawardene 85 (90); Saleem Mukuddem 2/50 (10 overs)		Lionel Cann 28 (32); Farveez Maharoof 4/23 (7 overs)

Sri Lanka won by 243 runs
Queen's Park Oval, Port of Spain
Umpires: Daryl Harper (Aus) and Ian Howell (SA)
Player of the match: Mahela Jayawardene (SL)

- Sri Lanka won the toss and elected to bat.

21 March 2007
scorecard

Sri Lanka; 318/4 (50 overs)	v	Bangladesh; 112 (37 overs)
Sanath Jayasuriya 109 (87); Mohammad Rafique 1/48 (10 overs)		Mohammad Ashraful 45* (63); Lasith Malinga 3/27 (6 overs)

Sri Lanka won by 198 runs (D/L method)
Queen's Park Oval, Port of Spain
Umpires: Steve Davis (Aus) and Daryl Harper (Aus)
Player of the match: Sanath Jayasuriya (SL)

- Sri Lanka won the toss and elected to bat.

23 March 2007
Scorecard

Sri Lanka; 254/6 (50 overs)	v	India; 185 (43.3 overs)
Upul Tharanga 64 (90); Zaheer Khan 2/49 (10 overs)		Rahul Dravid 60 (82); Muttiah Muralitharan 3/41 (10 overs)

Sri Lanka won by 69 runs
Queen's Park Oval, Port of Spain
Umpires: Aleem Dar (Pak) and Daryl Harper (Aus)
Player of the match: Muttiah Muralitharan (SL)

- Sri Lanka won the toss and elected to bat.

Super 8

28 March 2007
Scorecard

Sri Lanka; 209 (49.3 overs)	v	South Africa; 212/9 (48.2 overs)
Tillakaratne Dilshan 58 (76); Charl Langeveldt 5/39 (10 overs)		Jacques Kallis 86 (110); Lasith Malinga 4/54 (9.2 overs)

South Africa won by 1 wicket
Providence Stadium, Guyana
Umpires: Steve Bucknor (WI) and Daryl Harper (Aus)
Player of the match: Charl Langeveldt (SA) and Lasith Malinga (SL)

- Sri Lanka won the toss and elected to bat.

1 April 2007
Scorecard

Sri Lanka; 303/5 (50 overs)	v	West Indies; 190 (44.3 overs)
Sanath Jayasuriya 115 (101); Daren Powell 2/38 (10 overs)		Shivnarine Chanderpaul 76 (110); Chaminda Vaas 2/19 (8 overs)

Sri Lanka won by 113 runs
Providence Stadium, Guyana
Umpires: Mark Benson (Eng) and Daryl Harper (Aus)
Player of the match: Sanath Jayasuriya (SL)

- West Indies won the toss and elected to field.

4 April 2007
Scorecard

Sri Lanka; 235 (50 overs)	v	England; 233/8 (50 overs)
Upul Tharanga 62 (103); Sajid Mahmood 4/50 (9 overs)		Kevin Pietersen 58 (80); Dilhara Fernando 3/41 (9 overs)

Sri Lanka won by 2 runs
Sir Vivian Richards Stadium, North Sound
Umpires: Asad Rauf (Pak) and Billy Bowden (NZ)
Player of the match: Ravi Bopara (Eng)

- England won the toss and elected to field.

12 April 2007
Scorecard

New Zealand; 219/7 (50 overs)	v	Sri Lanka; 222/4 (45.1 overs)
Scott Styris 111* (157); Muttiah Muralitharan 3/32 (10 overs)		Kumar Sangakkara 69* (104); Daniel Vettori 2/35 (10 overs)

Sri Lanka won by 6 wickets
National Cricket Stadium, Grenada
Umpires: Asad Rauf (Pak) and Billy Doctrove (WI)
Player of the match: Chaminda Vaas (SL)

- New Zealand won the toss and elected to bat.

16 April 2007
Scorecard

Sri Lanka; 226 (49.4 overs)	v	Australia; 232/3 (42.4 overs)
Mahela Jayawardene 72 (88); Nathan Bracken 4/19 (9.4 overs)		Ricky Ponting 66* (80); Russel Arnold 2/20 (4 overs)

Australia won by 7 wickets
National Cricket Stadium, Grenada
Umpires: Aleem Dar (Pak) and Billy Doctrove (WI)
Player of the match: Nathan Bracken (Aus)

- Sri Lanka won the toss and elected to bat.

18 April 2007
Scorecard

Ireland; 77 (27.4 overs)	v	Sri Lanka; 81/2 (10 overs)
Jeremy Bray 20 (29); Muttiah Muralitharan 4/19 (5 overs)		Mahela Jayawardene 39* (27); Dave Langford-Smith 1/29 (3 overs)

Sri Lanka won by 8 wickets
National Cricket Stadium, Grenada
Umpires: Mark Benson (Eng) and Billy Doctrove (WI)
Player of the match: Farveez Maharoof (SL)

- Sri Lanka won the toss and elected to field.

Knockout stage

24 April 2007
Scorecard

Sri Lanka; 289/5 (50 overs)	v	New Zealand; 208 (41.4 overs)
Mahela Jayawardene 115* (109); James Franklin 2/46 (9 overs)		Peter Fulton 46 (77); Muttiah Muralitharan 4/31 (8 overs)

Sri Lanka won by 81 runs
Sabina Park, Kingston
Umpires: Rudi Koertzen (SA) and Simon Taufel (Aus)
Player of the match: Mahela Jayawardene (SL)

- Sri Lanka won the toss and elected to bat.
- Sri Lanka qualified for the final for second time after 1996.

28 April 2007
Scorecard

Australia; 281/4 (38 overs)	v	Sri Lanka; 215/8 (36 overs)
Adam Gilchrist 149 (104); Lasith Malinga 2/49 (8 overs)		Sanath Jayasuriya 63 (67); Michael Clarke 2/33 (5 overs)

Australia won by 53 runs (D/L method)
Kensington Oval, Bridgetown
Umpires: Steve Bucknor (WI) and Aleem Dar (Pak)
Player of the match: Adam Gilchrist (Aus)

- Australia won the toss and elected to bat.
- The match was reduced to 38 overs per side due to rain.
- Sri Lanka were set a revised target of 269 runs from 36 overs.

=== 2011 Cricket World Cup ===
Squad

- Kumar Sangakkara (c) (wk)
- Thisara Perera
- Thilan Samaraweera
- Chamara Silva
- Muttiah Muralitharan
- Rangana Herath
- Chamara Kapugedera
- Tillakaratne Dilshan
- Dilhara Fernando
- Mahela Jayawardene
- Ajantha Mendis
- Upul Tharanga
- Angelo Mathews
- Nuwan Kulasekara
- Lasith Malinga

Results

Group stage (Group A)							Quarterfinal	Semifinal	Final	Overall Result
Opposition Result	Opposition Result	Opposition Result	Opposition Result	Opposition Result	Opposition Result	Rank	Opposition Result	Opposition Result	Opposition Result	Overall Result
Canada; W by 210 runs	Pakistan; L by 11 runs	Kenya; W by 9 wickets	Australia; No result	Zimbabwe; W by 139 runs	New Zealand; W by 112 runs	1	England; W by 10 wickets	New Zealand; W by 5 wickets	India; L by 6 wickets	Runners-up

Scorecards

Group stage (Group A)

20 February 2011
14:30 (D/N)
Scorecard

Sri Lanka; 332/7 (50 overs)	v	Canada; 122 (36.5 overs)
Mahela Jayawardene 100 (81); John Davison 2/56 (8 overs)		Rizwan Cheema 37 (35); Nuwan Kulasekara 3/16 (6 overs)

Sri Lanka won by 210 runs
Mahinda Rajapaksa International Cricket Stadium, Sooriyawewa
Umpires: Ian Gould (Eng) and Shavir Tarapore (Ind)
Player of the match: Mahela Jayawardene (SL)

- Sri Lanka won the toss and elected to bat.

26 February 2011
14:30 (D/N)
Scorecard

Pakistan; 277/7 (50 overs)	v	Sri Lanka; 266/9 (50 overs)
Misbah-ul-Haq 83* (91); Rangana Herath 2/46 (10 overs)		Chamara Silva 57 (78); Shahid Afridi 4/34 (10 overs)

Pakistan won by 11 runs
R. Premadasa Stadium, Colombo
Umpires: Ian Gould (Eng) and Daryl Harper (Aus)
Player of the match: Shahid Afridi (Pak)

- Pakistan won the toss and elected to bat.

1 March 2011
14:30 (D/N)
Scorecard

Kenya; 142 (43.4 overs)	v	Sri Lanka; 146/1 (18.4 overs)
Collins Obuya 52 (100); Lasith Malinga 6/38 (7.4 overs)		Upul Tharanga 67* (59); Elijah Otieno 1/26 (4 overs)

Sri Lanka won by 9 wickets
R. Premadasa Stadium, Colombo
Umpires: Tony Hill (NZ) and Shavir Tarapore (Ind)
Player of the match: Lasith Malinga (SL)

- Kenya won the toss and elected to bat.

5 March 2011
14:30 (D/N)
Scorecard

Sri Lanka; 146/3 (32.5 overs)	v	Australia
Kumar Sangakkara 73* (102); Shaun Tait 1/23 (5 overs)

No result
R. Premadasa Stadium, Colombo
Umpires: Ian Gould (Eng) and Tony Hill (NZ)

- Sri Lanka won the toss and elected to bat.
- Rain stopped play at 17:30 local time

10 March 2011
14:30 (D/N)
Scorecard

Sri Lanka; 327/6 (50 overs)	v	Zimbabwe; 188 (39 overs)
Tillakaratne Dilshan 144 (131); Chris Mpofu 4/62 (7 overs)		Brendan Taylor 80 (72); Tillakaratne Dilshan 4/4 (3 overs)

Sri Lanka won by 139 runs
Pallekele International Cricket Stadium, Kandy
Umpires: Marais Erasmus (SA) and Nigel Llong (Eng)
Player of the match: Tillakaratne Dilshan (SL)

- Zimbabwe won the toss and elected to field.

18 March 2011
14:30 (D/N)
Scorecard

Sri Lanka; 265/9 (50 overs)	v	New Zealand; 153 (35 overs)
Kumar Sangakkara 111 (128); Tim Southee 3/63 (10 overs)		Ross Taylor 33 (55); Muttiah Muralitharan 4/25 (8 overs)

Sri Lanka won by 112 runs
Wankhede Stadium, Mumbai
Umpires: Asad Rauf (Pak) and Richard Kettleborough (Eng)
Player of the match: Kumar Sangakkara (SL)

- Sri Lanka won the toss and elected to bat.

Knockout stage

Quarter-final 4

26 March 2011
14:30 (D/N)
Scorecard

England; 229/6 (50 overs)	v	Sri Lanka; 231/0 (39.3 overs)
Jonathan Trott 86 (115); Muttiah Muralitharan 2/54 (9 overs)		Tillakaratne Dilshan 108* (115)

Sri Lanka won by 10 wickets
R. Premadasa Stadium, Colombo
Umpires: Billy Doctrove (WI) and Simon Taufel (Aus)
Player of the match: Tillakaratne Dilshan (SL)

- England won the toss and elected to bat.

Semi-final 1 New Zealand vs Sri Lanka

29 March 2011
14:30 (D/N)
Scorecard

New Zealand; 217 (48.5 overs)	v	Sri Lanka; 220/5 (47.5 overs)
Scott Styris 57 (77); Ajantha Mendis 3/35 (9.5 overs)		Tillakaratne Dilshan 73 (93); Tim Southee 3/57 (10 overs)

Sri Lanka won by 5 wickets
R. Premadasa Stadium, Colombo
Umpires: Aleem Dar (Pak) and Steve Davis (Aus)
Player of the match: Kumar Sangakkara (SL)

- New Zealand won the toss and elected to bat.
- Sri Lanka qualified for the final for third time after 1996 and 2007.

Final
Main article: 2011 Cricket World Cup final

2 April 2011
14:30 (D/N)
Scorecard

Sri Lanka; 274/6 (50 overs)	v	India; 277/4 (48.2 overs)
Mahela Jayawardene 103* (88); Yuvraj Singh 2/49 (10 overs)		Gautam Gambhir 97 (122); Lasith Malinga 2/42 (9 overs)

India won by 6 wickets
Wankhede Stadium, Mumbai
Umpires: Simon Taufel (Aus) and Aleem Dar (Pak)
Player of the match: MS Dhoni (Ind)

- Sri Lanka won the toss and elected to bat.
- Sreesanth (Ind), Muttiah Muralitharan and Thilan Samaraweera (SL) played in their last ODI.

This was Sri Lanka's second consecutive loss in a World Cup Final and was also Muttiah Muralitharan's last ODI match, as well as Sachin Tendulkar's last World Cup match, having been playing World Cups for India since 1992. This match also recorded the highest successful run chase by any team in a World Cup Final and also only the third time that a team batting second had won the World Cup Final. This was also the first time that a host nation in their own country won the World Cup.

The final was played on 2 April between India and Sri Lanka at Wankhede Stadium, Mumbai. India were crowned champions after winning by six wickets with only 10 balls remaining. India captain MS Dhoni was named man of the match after an unbeaten, match-winning innings of 91 runs off 79 balls, including the final shot that won the game. Gautam Gambhir contributed with a crucial knock of 97 after India lost early wickets. After the match, the Indian players paid tribute to Sachin Tendulkar, who was playing in his last World Cup. The final had a viewership of about 558 million people all over the world.

=== 2015 Cricket World Cup ===
Squad

- Angelo Mathews (c)
- Thisara Perera
- Jeevan Mendis
- Kumar Sangakkara (wk)
- Rangana Herath
- Dushmantha Chameera
- Sachithra Senanayake
- Dimuth Karunaratne
- Tillakaratne Dilshan
- Mahela Jayawardene
- Dinesh Chandimal (wk)
- Lahiru Thirimanne
- Suranga Lakmal
- Nuwan Kulasekara
- Lasith Malinga
- Seekkuge Prasanna
- Tharindu Kaushal

Results

Pool stage (Pool A)							Quarterfinal	Semifinal	Final	Overall Result
Opposition Result	Opposition Result	Opposition Result	Opposition Result	Opposition Result	Opposition Result	Rank	Opposition Result	Opposition Result	Opposition Result	Overall Result
New Zealand; L by 98 runs	Afghanistan; W by 4 wickets	Bangladesh; W by 92 runs	England; W by 9 wickets	Australia; L by 65 runs	Scotland; W by 148 runs	3	South Africa; L by 9 wickets	Did not advance		Quarter-finals

Scorecards

Pool stage (Pool A)

14 February
11:00 (NZDT)
Scorecard

New Zealand; 331/6 (50 overs)	v	Sri Lanka; 233 (46.1 overs)
Corey Anderson 75 (46); Jeevan Mendis 2/5 (2 overs)		Lahiru Thirimanne 65 (60); Corey Anderson 2/18 (3.1 overs)

New Zealand won by 98 runs
Hagley Oval, Christchurch
Attendance: 17,228
Umpires: Marais Erasmus (SA) and Nigel Llong (Eng)
Player of the match: Corey Anderson (NZ)

- Sri Lanka won the toss and elected to field.
- Kumar Sangakkara (SL) became the second highest run scorer in ODIs.

22 February
11:00 (NZDT)
Scorecard

Afghanistan; 232 (49.4 overs)	v	Sri Lanka; 236/6 (48.2 overs)
Asghar Afghan 54 (57); Lasith Malinga 3/41 (7 overs)		Mahela Jayawardene 100 (120); Hamid Hassan 3/45 (9 overs)

Sri Lanka won by 4 wickets
University Oval, Dunedin
Attendance: 2,711
Umpires: Chris Gaffaney (NZ) and Richard Illingworth (Eng)
Player of the match: Mahela Jayawardene (SL)

- Sri Lanka won the toss and elected to field.
- Both Sri Lanka openers (Lahiru Thirimanne and Tillakaratne Dilshan) were dismissed for golden ducks. It was the second time in ODI history where this has occurred.
- Hamid Hassan became first Afghan bowler to take 50 ODI wickets and seventh-quickest in the world to take 50 ODI wickets.

26 February
14:30 (AEDT) (D/N)
Scorecard

Sri Lanka; 332/1 (50 overs)	v	Bangladesh; 240 (47 overs)
Tillakaratne Dilshan 161* (146); Rubel Hossain 1/62 (9 overs)		Sabbir Rahman 53 (62); Lasith Malinga 3/35 (9 overs)

Sri Lanka won by 92 runs
MCG, Melbourne
Attendance: 30,012
Umpires: Aleem Dar (Pak) and Paul Reiffel (Aus)
Player of the match: Tillakaratne Dilshan (SL)

- Sri Lanka won the toss and elected to bat.
- Tillakaratne Dilshan and Kumar Sangakkara's unbroken partnership of 210 was Sri Lanka's highest second-wicket partnership in ODIs.
- Kumar Sangakkara became the fourth cricketer to play 400 ODI matches.
- Dilshan's score of 161 not out was the highest individual score in an ODI without hitting a six.

1 March
11:00 (NZDT)
Scorecard

England; 309/6 (50 overs)	v	Sri Lanka; 312/1 (47.2 overs)
Joe Root 121 (108); Tillakaratne Dilshan 1/35 (8.2 overs)		Lahiru Thirimanne 139* (143); Moeen Ali 1/50 (10 overs)

Sri Lanka won by 9 wickets
Wellington Regional Stadium, Wellington
Attendance: 18,183
Umpires: Bruce Oxenford (Aus) and Rod Tucker (Aus)
Player of the match: Kumar Sangakkara (SL)

- England won the toss and elected to bat.
- Joe Root became the youngest English player to score a century at a World Cup.
- Lahiru Thirimanne became the youngest Sri Lankan player to score a century at a World Cup.
- Sri Lanka became the first team in a World Cup match to chase down a score of more than 300 runs for the loss of only one wicket.
- Suranga Lakmal (SL) was fined 30% of his match fee for bowling two beamers in the final over.

8 March
14:30 (AEDT) (D/N)
Scorecard

Australia; 376/9 (50 overs)	v	Sri Lanka; 312 (46.2 overs)
Glenn Maxwell 102 (53); Lasith Malinga 2/59 (10 overs)		Kumar Sangakkara 104 (107); James Faulkner 3/48 (9 overs)

Australia won by 64 runs
SCG, Sydney
Attendance: 39,951
Umpires: Aleem Dar (Pak) and Ian Gould (Eng)
Player of the match: Glenn Maxwell (Aus)

- Australia won the toss and elected to bat.
- Umpire Ian Gould stood in his 100th ODI match.
- Glenn Maxwell scored his maiden ODI century, the fastest by an Australian in a World Cup (51 balls) and the second-fastest overall.
- Tillakaratne Dilshan hit six fours off an over, bowled by Mitchell Johnson, the first time this has happened in World Cup history.
- Kumar Sangakkara became the second player to score 14,000 ODI runs, and scored a record third consecutive World Cup century.
- Dinesh Chandimal retired hurt, and did not return to complete his innings.
- New Zealand were confirmed as Pool A winners as a result of this match.
- Australia qualified for the quarter-finals as a result of this match.

11 March
14:30 (AEDT) (D/N)
Scorecard

Sri Lanka; 363/9 (50 overs)	v	Scotland; 215 (43.1 overs)
Kumar Sangakkara 124 (95); Josh Davey 3/63 (8 overs)		Freddie Coleman 70 (74); Nuwan Kulasekara 3/20 (7 overs)

Sri Lanka won by 148 runs
Bellerive Oval, Hobart
Attendance: 3,549
Umpires: Richard Illingworth (Eng) and Joel Wilson (WI)
Player of the match: Kumar Sangakkara (SL)

- Sri Lanka won the toss and elected to bat.
- Kumar Sangakkara hit a record fourth consecutive ODI century.
- Sangakkara has now taken 54 dismissals as a wicket keeper, the most by any player in World Cups.
- Angelo Mathews scored Sri Lanka's fastest World Cup fifty and their second fastest in all ODIs (20 balls).
- This is the highest score conceded by Scotland in an ODI.

Knockout stage

Quarter-final 1 South Africa v Sri Lanka

18 March
14:30 (AEDT) (D/N)
Scorecard

Sri Lanka; 133 (37.2 overs)	v	South Africa; 134/1 (18 overs)
Kumar Sangakkara 45 (96); Imran Tahir 4/26 (8.2 overs)		Quinton de Kock 78* (57); Lasith Malinga 1/43 (6 overs)

South Africa won by 9 wickets
Sydney Cricket Ground, Sydney
Umpires: Nigel Llong (Eng) and Rod Tucker (Aus)
Player of the match: Imran Tahir (SA)

- Sri Lanka won the toss and elected to bat.
- JP Duminy (SA) became the first South African to take a World Cup hat-trick when he dismissed Angelo Mathews, Nuwan Kulasekara and Tharindu Kaushal, and only the second South African in ODI history.
- This was South Africa's first win in the knockout stage of a World Cup.
- This was the shortest ever World Cup knockout match.
- This was the last ODI game for Kumar Sangakkara (SL) and Mahela Jayawardene (SL) and their 150th game together.

=== 2019 Cricket World Cup ===
Squad

- Dimuth Karunaratne (c)
- Thisara Perera
- Kusal Mendis (wk)
- Isuru Udana
- Avishka Fernando
- Jeffrey Vandersay
- Kusal Perera (wk)
- Milinda Siriwardana
- Nuwan Pradeep
- Lahiru Thirimanne
- Angelo Mathews
- Dhananjaya de Silva (vc)
- Suranga Lakmal
- Jeevan Mendis
- Lasith Malinga

Results

League stage										Semifinal	Final	Overall Result
Opposition Result	Opposition Result	Opposition Result	Opposition Result	Opposition Result	Opposition Result	Opposition Result	Opposition Result	Opposition Result	Rank	Opposition Result	Opposition Result	Overall Result
New Zealand; L by 98 runs	Afghanistan; W by 34 runs (DLS)	Pakistan; Match abandoned	Bangladesh; Match abandoned	Australia; L by 87 runs	England; W by 20 runs	South Africa; L by 9 wickets	West Indies; W by 23 runs	India; L by 7 wickets	6	Did not advance		League stage

Scorecards

League stage

14 February
11:00 (NZDT)
Scorecard

New Zealand; 331/6 (50 overs)	v	Sri Lanka; 233 (46.1 overs)
Corey Anderson 75 (46); Jeevan Mendis 2/5 (2 overs)		Lahiru Thirimanne 65 (60); Corey Anderson 2/18 (3.1 overs)

New Zealand won by 98 runs
Hagley Oval, Christchurch
Attendance: 17,228
Umpires: Marais Erasmus (SA) and Nigel Llong (Eng)
Player of the match: Corey Anderson (NZ)

- Sri Lanka won the toss and elected to field.
- Kumar Sangakkara (SL) became the second highest run scorer in ODIs.

4 June 2019
10:30
Scorecard

Sri Lanka; 201 (36.5 overs)	v	Afghanistan; 152 (32.4 overs)
Kusal Perera 78 (81); Mohammad Nabi 4/30 (9 overs)		Najibullah Zadran 43 (56); Nuwan Pradeep 4/31 (9 overs)

Sri Lanka won by 34 runs (DLS method)
Sophia Gardens, Cardiff
Umpires: Nigel Llong (Eng) and Paul Wilson (Aus)
Player of the match: Nuwan Pradeep (SL)

- Afghanistan won the toss and elected to field.
- Afghanistan were set a revised target of 187 runs from 41 overs due to rain.
- Rashid Khan played in his 100th international match for Afghanistan.
- Lahiru Thirimanne (SL) scored his 3,000th run in ODIs.

7 June 2019
10:30
Scorecard

Pakistan	v	Sri Lanka

Match abandoned
County Ground, Bristol
Umpires: Ian Gould (Eng) and Nigel Llong (Eng)

- No toss.
- No play was possible due to rain.

11 June 2019
10:30
Scorecard

Bangladesh	v	Sri Lanka

Match abandoned
County Ground, Bristol
Umpires: Richard Illingworth (Eng) and Richard Kettleborough (Eng)

- No toss.
- No play was possible due to rain.

15 June 2019
10:30
Scorecard

Australia; 334/7 (50 overs)	v	Sri Lanka; 247 (45.5 overs)
Aaron Finch 153 (132); Dhananjaya de Silva 2/40 (8 overs)		Dimuth Karunaratne 97 (108); Mitchell Starc 4/55 (10 overs)

Australia won by 87 runs
The Oval, London
Umpires: Aleem Dar (Pak) and Richard Illingworth (Eng)
Player of the match: Aaron Finch (Aus)

- Sri Lanka won the toss and elected to field.

21 June 2019
10:30
Scorecard

Sri Lanka; 232/9 (50 overs)	v	England; 212 (47 overs)
Angelo Mathews 85* (115); Mark Wood 3/40 (8 overs)		Ben Stokes 82* (89); Lasith Malinga 4/43 (10 overs)

Sri Lanka won by 20 runs
Headingley, Leeds
Umpires: Marais Erasmus (SA) and Paul Wilson (Aus)
Player of the match: Lasith Malinga (SL)

- Sri Lanka won the toss and elected to bat.
- Moeen Ali (Eng) played in his 100th ODI.
- Adil Rashid played in his 150th international match for England.
- Joe Root played in his 250th international match for England.
- Angelo Mathews scored his 12,000th international run for Sri Lanka.
- Eoin Morgan scored his 9,000th international run for England.
- Lasith Malinga (SL) took his 50th wicket in a World Cup match, and became the quickest to achieve the milestone.

28 June 2019
10:30
Scorecard

Sri Lanka; 203 (49.3 overs)	v	South Africa; 206/1 (37.2 overs)
Avishka Fernando 30 (29); Dwaine Pretorius 3/25 (10 overs)		Faf du Plessis 96* (103); Lasith Malinga 1/47 (10 overs)

South Africa won by 9 wickets
Riverside Ground, Chester-le-Street
Umpires: Sundaram Ravi (Ind) and Rod Tucker (Aus)
Player of the match: Dwaine Pretorius (SA)

- South Africa won the toss and elected to field.

1 July 2019
10:30
Scorecard

Sri Lanka; 338/6 (50 overs)	v	West Indies; 315/9 (50 overs)
Avishka Fernando 104 (103); Jason Holder 2/59 (10 overs)		Nicholas Pooran 118 (103); Lasith Malinga 3/55 (10 overs)

Sri Lanka won by 23 runs
Riverside Ground, Chester-le-Street
Umpires: Bruce Oxenford (Aus) and Paul Reiffel (Aus)
Player of the match: Avishka Fernando (SL)

- West Indies won the toss and elected to field.
- Chris Gayle became the most capped player for the West Indies in international cricket, playing in his 455th match.
- Avishka Fernando (SL) scored his first century in ODIs.
- Jason Holder became the first captain of the West Indies to take 100 wickets in ODIs.
- Nicholas Pooran (WI) scored his first century in ODIs.

6 July 2019
10:30
Scorecard

Sri Lanka; 264/7 (50 overs)	v	India; 265/3 (43.3 overs)
Angelo Mathews 113 (128); Jasprit Bumrah 3/37 (10 overs)		K. L. Rahul 111 (118); Kasun Rajitha 1/47 (8 overs)

India won by 7 wickets
Headingley, Leeds
Umpires: Ian Gould (Eng) and Paul Wilson (Aus)
Player of the match: Rohit Sharma (Ind)

- Sri Lanka won the toss and elected to bat.
- Dinesh Karthik played in his 150th international match for India.
- Jasprit Bumrah (Ind) took his 100th wicket in ODIs.
- Rohit Sharma (Ind) became the first batsman to score five centuries in the same World Cup tournament.

=== 2023 Cricket World Cup ===
Squad

- Dasun Shanaka (c)
- Kusal Mendis (vc) (wk)
- Pathum Nissanka
- Dimuth Karunaratne
- Charith Asalanka
- Sadeera Samarawickrama (wk)
- Dhananjaya de Silva
- Dushan Hemantha
- Chamika Karunaratne
- Maheesh Theekshana
- Dunith Wellalage
- Kasun Rajitha
- Dilshan Madushanka
- Angelo Mathews
- Dushmantha Chameera
- Kusal Perera
- Note: Chamika Karunaratne, Angelo Mathews and Dushmantha Chameera replaced Dasun Shanaka, Matheesha Pathirana and Lahiru Kumara.

Results

League stage										Semifinal	Final	Overall Result
Opposition Result	Opposition Result	Opposition Result	Opposition Result	Opposition Result	Opposition Result	Opposition Result	Opposition Result	Opposition Result	Rank	Opposition Result	Opposition Result	Overall Result
South Africa; L by 102 runs	Pakistan; L by 6 wickets	Australia; L by 5 wickets	Netherlands; W by 5 wickets	England; W by 8 wickets	Afghanistan; L by 7 wickets	India; L by 302 runs	Bangladesh; L by 3 wickets	New Zealand; L by 5 wickets	9	Did not advance		League stage

Scorecards

League stage

7 October 2023
14:00 (D/N)
Scorecard

South Africa; 428/5 (50 overs)	v	Sri Lanka; 326 (44.5 overs)
Rassie van der Dussen 108 (110); Dilshan Madushanka 2/86 (10 overs)		Charith Asalanka 79 (65); Gerald Coetzee 3/68 (9 overs)

South Africa won by 102 runs
Arun Jaitley Cricket Stadium, New Delhi
Umpires: Richard Illingworth (Eng) and Sharfuddoula (Ban)
Player of the match: Aiden Markram (SA)

- Sri Lanka won the toss and elected to field.
- South Africa's 428 surpassed Australia's 417 in 2015 as the highest innings total in World Cup history.
- Aiden Markram (SA) broke Kevin O'Brien's record for the fastest century in World Cup history, in terms of balls faced (49).
- The 754 runs scored in the fixture was the highest match aggregate in a World Cup match, surpassing Australia and Bangladesh's 714 runs in 2019.

10 October 2023
14:00 (D/N)
Scorecard

Sri Lanka; 344/9 (50 overs)	v	Pakistan; 345/4 (48.2 overs)
Kusal Mendis 122 (77); Hasan Ali 4/71 (10 overs)		Mohammad Rizwan 131* (121); Dilshan Madushanka 2/60 (9.2 overs)

Pakistan won by 6 wickets
Rajiv Gandhi International Cricket Stadium, Hyderabad
Umpires: Chris Gaffaney (NZ) and Alex Wharf (Eng)
Player of the match: Mohammad Rizwan (Pak)

- Sri Lanka won the toss and elected to bat.
- Sadeera Samarawickrama (SL) and Abdullah Shafique (Pak) both made their maiden centuries in ODIs.
- Imam-ul-Haq (Pak) scored his 3,000th run in ODIs.
- This was the highest successful run chase in World Cup history, surpassing Ireland's 329 against England in 2011.
- This was the third time four centuries were scored in an ODI, and first in World Cups.

16 October 2023
14:00 (D/N)
Scorecard

Sri Lanka; 209 (43.3 overs)	v	Australia; 215/5 (35.2 overs)
Kusal Perera 78 (82); Adam Zampa 4/47 (8 overs)		Josh Inglis 58 (59); Dilshan Madushanka 3/38 (9 overs)

Australia won by 5 wickets
Ekana Cricket Stadium, Lucknow
Umpires: Chris Gaffaney (NZ) and Joel Wilson (WI) (Note: Joel Wilson replaced Alex Wharf.)
Player of the match: Adam Zampa (Aus)

- Sri Lanka won the toss and elected to bat.

21 October 2023
10:30
Scorecard

Netherlands; 262 (49.4 overs)	v	Sri Lanka; 263/5 (48.2 overs)
Sybrand Engelbrecht 70 (82); Dilshan Madushanka 4/49 (9.4 overs)		Sadeera Samarawickrama 91* (107); Aryan Dutt 3/44 (10 overs)

Sri Lanka won by 5 wickets
Ekana Cricket Stadium, Lucknow
Umpires: Marais Erasmus (SA) and Ahsan Raza (Pak)
Player of the match: Sadeera Samarawickrama (SL)

- Netherlands won the toss and elected to bat.

26 October 2023
14:00 (D/N)
Scorecard

England; 156 (33.2 overs)	v	Sri Lanka; 160/2 (25.4 overs)
Ben Stokes 43 (73); Lahiru Kumara 3/35 (7 overs)		Pathum Nissanka 77* (83); David Willey 2/30 (5 overs)

Sri Lanka won by 8 wickets
M. Chinnaswamy Stadium, Bengaluru
Umpires: Chris Brown (NZ) and Adrian Holdstock (SA)
Player of the match: Lahiru Kumara (SL)

- England won the toss and elected to bat.

30 October 2023
14:00 (D/N)
Scorecard

Sri Lanka; 241 (49.3 overs)	v	Afghanistan; 242/3 (45.2 overs)
Pathum Nissanka 46 (60); Fazalhaq Farooqi 4/34 (10 overs)		Azmatullah Omarzai 73* (63); Dilshan Madushanka 2/48 (9 overs)

Afghanistan won by 7 wickets
Maharashtra Cricket Association Stadium, Pune
Umpires: Chris Gaffaney (NZ) and Richard Illingworth (Eng)
Player of the match: Fazalhaq Farooqi (Afg)

- Afghanistan won the toss and elected to field.
- Rashid Khan (Afg) played in his 100th ODI.
- Hashmatullah Shahidi (Afg) scored his 2,000th run in ODIs.
- This was Afghanistan's first win against Sri Lanka in the Cricket World Cup.

2 November 2023
14:00 (D/N)
Scorecard

India; 357/8 (50 overs)	v	Sri Lanka; 55 (19.4 overs)
Shubman Gill 92 (92); Dilshan Madushanka 5/80 (10 overs)		Kasun Rajitha 14 (17); Mohammed Shami 5/18 (5 overs)

India won by 302 runs
Wankhede Stadium, Mumbai
Umpires: Chris Brown (NZ) and Paul Reiffel (Aus)
Player of the match: Mohammed Shami (Ind)

- Sri Lanka won the toss and elected to field.
- Dilshan Madushanka (SL) took his first five-wicket haul in ODI.
- Mohammed Shami became the highest wicket-taker for India at the Cricket World Cup, surpassing Zaheer Khan and Javagal Srinath (44 wickets).
- This was India's largest win, in terms of runs, at the Cricket World Cup.
- India qualified for the semi-finals as a result of this match.

6 November 2023
14:00 (D/N)
Scorecard

Sri Lanka; 279 (49.3 overs)	v	Bangladesh; 282/7 (41.1 overs)
Charith Asalanka 108 (105); Tanzim Hasan Sakib 3/80 (10 overs)		Najmul Hossain Shanto 90 (101); Dilshan Madushanka 3/69 (10 overs)

Bangladesh won by 3 wickets
Arun Jaitley Cricket Stadium, New Delhi
Umpires: Marais Erasmus (SA) and Richard Illingworth (Eng)
Player of the match: Shakib Al Hasan (Ban)

- Bangladesh won the toss and elected to field.
- Angelo Mathews (SL) became the first player in any international cricket match to be dismissed by being timed out.
- Sri Lanka were eliminated as the result of this match.
- This was Bangladesh's first win against Sri Lanka in Cricket World Cup.

9 November 2023
14:00 (D/N)
Scorecard

Sri Lanka; 171 (46.4 overs)	v	New Zealand; 172/5 (23.2 overs)
Kusal Perera 51 (28); Trent Boult 3/37 (10 overs)		Devon Conway 45 (42); Angelo Mathews 2/29 (4 overs)

New Zealand won by 5 wickets
M. Chinnaswamy Stadium, Bengaluru
Umpires: Adrian Holdstock (SA) and Joel Wilson (WI)
Player of the match: Trent Boult (NZ)

- New Zealand won the toss and elected to field.
- Trent Boult (NZ) became the 3rd bowler to have taken 600 wickets for New Zealand in all international cricket formats. He also became the first ever bowler to have taken 50 wickets for New Zealand at the Cricket World Cup.
- Mitchell Santner (NZ) equaled Daniel Vettori's record for most wickets taken by a New Zealand player in a Cricket World Cup edition.

== Records and statistics ==
=== Team records ===
Highest innings totals

Score	Opponent	Venue	Season
398/5 (50 overs)	Kenya	Asgiriya	1996
363/9 (50 overs)	Scotland	Hobart	2015
344/9 (50 overs)	Pakistan	Hyderabad	2023
338/6 (50 overs)	West Indies	Chester-le-Street	2019
332/7 (50 overs)	Canada	Hambantota	2011
Last updated: 9 November 2023

Lowest innings totals

Score	Opponent	Venue	Season
55 (19.4 overs)	India	Wankhede	2023
86 (37.2 overs)	West Indies	Manchester	1975
109 (23 overs)	India	Johannesburg	2003
110 (35.2 overs)	South Africa	Northampton	1999
133 (37.2 overs)	South Africa	Sydney	2015
Last updated: 9 November 2023

=== Most appearances ===
This list consists players with most number of matches at the Cricket World Cup. Mahela Jayawardene played a total of 40 World Cup matches and Duleep Mendis has captained the team in the most number of matches(12).

Matches	Player	Period
40	Mahela Jayawardene	1999-2015
40	Muthiah Muralidaran	1996-2011
38	Sanath Jayasuriya	1992-2007
37	Kumar Sangakkara	2003-2015
35	Aravinda de Silva	1987-2003
Last updated: 9 November 2023

=== Batting records ===
Most runs

Runs	Player	Mat	Inn	HS	Avg	100s	50s	Period
1532	Kumar Sangakkara	37	35	124	56.74	5	7	2003–2015
1165	Sanath Jayasuriya	38	37	120	34.26	3	6	1992–2007
1112	Tillakaratne Dilshan	27	25	161*	52.95	4	4	2007–2015
1100	Mahela Jayawardene	40	34	115*	35.48	4	5	1999–2015
1064	Aravinda de Silva	35	32	145	36.68	2	6	1987–2003
Last updated: 9 November 2023

Highest individual innings

Score	Player	Opponent	Venue	Year
161*	Tillakaratne Dilshan	Bangladesh	Melbourne	2015
145	Aravinda de Silva	Kenya	Asgiriya	1996
144	Tillakaratne Dilshan	Zimbabwe	Pallekele	2011
139*	Lahiru Thirimanne	England	Wellington	2015
133	Upul Tharanga	Zimbabwe	Pallekele	2011
Last updated: 9 November 2023

Most centuries

Player	Centuries	Period
Kumar Sangakkara	5	2003-2015
Tillakaratne Dilshan	4	2007-2015
Mahela Jayawardene	4	1999-2015
Sanath Jayasuriya	3	1992-2007
Last updated: 9 November 2023

Most fifties

Player	Fifties	Period
Kumar Sangakkara	12	2003-2015
Mahela Jayawardene	9	1999-2015
Sanath Jayasuriya	9	1992-2007
Tillakaratne Dilshan	8	2007-2015
Aravinda de Silva	8	1987-2003
Last updated: 9 November 2023

=== Bowling records ===
Most wickets

Wickets	Player	Matches	Avg.	Econ.	4W	5W	Period
68	Muthiah Muralidaran	40	19.63	3.88	4	0	1996–2011
56	Lasith Malinga	29	22.87	5.51	2	1	2007–2019
49	Chaminda Vaas	31	21.22	3.97	1	1	1996–2007
27	Sanath Jayasuriya	38	39.25	4.83	0	0	1992–2007
21	Dilshan Madushanka	9	25.00	6.70	1	1	2023–2023
Last updated: 9 November 2023

Best bowling figures

Player	Bowling figures	Opponent	Venue	Year
Chaminda Vaas	6/25 (9.1 overs)	Bangladesh	Pietermaritzburg	2003
Lasith Malinga	6/38 (7.4 overs)	Kenya	Colombo (RPS)	2011
Ashantha de Mel	5/32 (12 overs)	New Zealand	Derby	1983
Ashantha de Mel	5/39 (12 overs)	Pakistan	Headingley	1983
Dilshan Madushanka	5/80 (10 overs)	India	Wankhede	2023
Last updated: 9 November 2023

=== Partnership records ===
Highest partnerships by runs

Runs	Players	Opposition	Venue	Season
282 (1st wicket)	Upul Tharanga & Tillakaratne Dilshan	v Zimbabwe	Pallekele	2011
231* (1st wicket)	Upul Tharanga & Tillakaratne Dilshan	v England	Colombo (RPS)	2011
212* (2nd wicket)	Lahiru Thirimanne & Kumar Sangakkara	v England	Wellington	2015
210* (2nd wicket)	Kumar Sangakkara & Tillakaratne Dilshan	v Bangladesh	Melbourne	2015
195 (2nd wicket)	Kumar Sangakkara & Tillakaratne Dilshan	v Scotland	Hobart	2015
Last updated: 9 November 2023

=== Wicket-keeping records ===
Most dismissals

Dismissals	Player	Matches	Cat.	St.	Period
54	Kumar Sangakkara	37	41	13	2003–2015
12	Romesh Kaluwitharana	11	8	4	1996–1999
8	Kusal Perera	16	8	–	2015–2023
7	Hashan Tillakaratne	24	6	1	1992–2003
7	Kusal Mendis	16	6	1	2019–2023
Last updated: 9 November 2023

=== Fielding records ===
Most catches

Catches	Player	Matches	Period
18	Sanath Jayasuriya	38	1992-2007
16	Mahela Jayawardene	40	1999-2015
14	Aravinda de Silva	35	1987-2003
13	Muthiah Muralidaran	40	1996-2011
12	Tillakaratne Dilshan	27	2007-2015
Last updated: 9 November 2023
