= Bangladesh–Sri Lanka cricket rivalry =

International sporting rivalry

- Other names: Naagin Derby, Lion vs Tiger Derby
- Sport: Cricket
- Teams: Sri Lanka; Bangladesh
- First meeting: Test: 21–23 July 2002 (Sri Lanka won the match by an innings and 196 runs); ODI 2 April 1986 (Sri Lanka won by 7 wickets); T20I: 18 September 2007, 2007 T20 World Cup (Sri Lanka won by 64 runs)
- Latest meeting: Test: 25–28 June 2025 (Sri Lanka won by an innings and 78 runs); ODI: 8 July 2025 (Sri Lanka won by 99 runs); T20I: 20 September 2025, (Bangladesh won by 4 wickets)
- Next meeting: Test: TBA; ODI: TBA; T20I: TBA
- Trophy: Sri Lanka: 9 (1 Cricket World Cup, 1 T20 World Cup, 1 Champions Trophy, 6 Asia Cup); Bangladesh: 0

Statistics
- Total meetings: Test: 28; ODI: 60; T20I: 21
- Most wins: Test: (Sri Lanka 21; Bangladesh 1); ODI: (Sri Lanka 45; Bangladesh 13); T20I: (Sri Lanka 13; Bangladesh 9)

The Naagin Derby is an intense cricket rivalry. It's a friendly regional rivalry in Asian cricket. Sri Lanka dominated the rivalry from its inception in 1986 until 2017, after which the rivalry became more competitive in limited-overs cricket, with Bangladesh managing victories in both bilateral series and ICC tournament fixtures.

At the senior men's level, Sri Lanka has won 3 ICC trophies (1 Cricket World Cup, 1 T20 World Cup, and 1 Champions Trophy) in addition to 6 Asia Cups. Bangladesh has never won an international multilateral competition, with their best results in ICC events being reaching the quarter-finals of the 2015 Cricket World Cup and the semi-finals of the 2017 ICC Champions Trophy. They have played the Asia Cup finals thrice, in 2012, 2016 and 2018.

The two sides first played in 1986, when Bangladesh toured Sri Lanka for the 1986 Asia Cup after winning the 1984 South-East Asia Cup. Since then, several bilateral Test and limited overs series have been played. The growth of large expatriate populations from both countries across the world led to neutral venues, including Australia, the UAE and Canada, hosting One Day International (ODI) series involving the two teams. The teams have also met several times in International Cricket Council (ICC) and Asian Cricket Council (ACC) tournaments.

== History ==
Between 1986 and 2001, no bilateral series were played between Bangladesh and Sri Lanka, with the two sides only meeting in Asia Cup matches. Sri Lanka dominated the rivalry for decades, with Bangladesh only managing its first ODI victory in 2006, while a test victory eluded them until 2017, after which the rivalry became more competitive.

The two nations' cricketing setups have regularly interacted in recent decades. Several former Sri Lankan players have been appointed to coaching positions in Bangladesh, such as Athula Samarasekara, Ruwan Kalpage, Mario Villavarayan, Champaka Ramanayake, Rangana Herath, Thilan Samaraweera, Naveed Nawaz, Hashan Tillakaratne and current coach Chandika Hathurusinghe. Sri Lankan players have also played in the domestic Bangladesh Premier League since its establishment in 2012, when high-profile Sri Lankans Sanath Jayasuriya and Muttiah Muralitharan signed on.

=== Naagin dance ===
On 15 February 2018, the rivalry arose when Bangladesh spinner Nazmul Islam celebrated his maiden T20I wicket with his trademark naagin dance after dismissing Sri Lankan opener Danushka Gunathilaka. Sri Lanka, however, won the match by 6 wickets. In the second T20I of the series, on 18 February 2018, Gunathilaka responded by mimicking Nazmul's naagin dance towards the non-striker's end where Nazmul was standing, after taking the final Bangladesh wicket to complete the series win 2–0.

The two teams then met in Sri Lanka for the 2018 Nidahas Trophy along with India, which was held to celebrate the 70 years of independence of Sri Lanka. On 10 March 2018, in the first match between Sri Lanka and Bangladesh, Mushfiqur Rahim of Bangladesh did an angry version of the Naagin dance towards the bowler Thisara Perera after his match-winning fifty in front of a packed Sri Lankan crowd. This event created a huge amount of disrespect towards Bangladesh by Sri Lankan fans, who started to criticise them in public. This loss also marked Sri Lanka's 50th loss in T20Is, making them the first team to record 50 defeats in T20Is, and Bangladesh's highest successful chase in T20Is, and it was the fourth highest successful run chase in T20Is.

The next match between the teams had more drama on and off the field. The sixth match of the tournament and a must-win situation for Sri Lanka to reach the final was held on 16 March 2018, in Colombo. Sri Lanka batted first and scored 159 courtesy of Kusal Perera's 61 and skipper Thisara Perera's quick 58. In chasing, Bangladesh was 33 for 2 in the fourth over, but Mushfiqur Rahim and Tamim Iqbal sustained a partnership of 64 runs off 52 balls and gained momentum. After their wickets had fallen, Bangladesh still required 51 off 31 balls with 5 wickets in hand. Mahmudullah came to bat. Bangladesh needed 12 runs in the last over, which was bowled by Isuru Udana. Udana started with a short delivery on middle and leg in the first ball and then took a wicket in the second ball with a bouncer. Bangladesh needed 12 off four when Udana delivered another bouncer to Mahmadullah, which was not given wide by the umpires. This made for a heated conversation between Bangladesh sub fielder Nurul Hasan and the Sri Lankan fielders, especially skipper Thisara Perera and Kusal Mendis, by pointing fingers and aggressive bodily contact.

Meanwhile, the umpires had a chat with the two batsmen when Bangladesh's skipper Shakib al Hasan, who was shirtless, interfered and asked the two batsmen to leave the ground. However, the assistant coach of Bangladesh, Khaled Mahmud, informed Mahmudullah to go back and finish the game. In the next three balls, Mahmudullah scored 4, 2 and 6 to seal the game, knocking Sri Lanka from the final. After the win, Bangladesh players, led by captain Shakib and the coaching staff, stormed the field to celebrate the victory with a 'Nagin Dance' directed towards Sri Lankan players and the crowd. During the course, Bangladeshi players shattered the window of the Bangladesh dressing room in R. Premadasa Stadium as well. Following this, the BCB paid SLC for the broken glass door of the Bangladesh dressing room. Later, both Shakib and Nurul received one demerit point each for breaching Level 1 of the ICC code of conduct and were fined 25% of their match fees.

In the final between Bangladesh and India, Sri Lankan fans made a campaign to support India in the final and showed several banners "No more cobra dance, cheer for India". India needed 34 in 12 balls, where Dinesh Karthik made a masterclass innings to win the title for India. After the win, Sri Lankan fans celebrated the moment with a Naagin dance showing towards Bangladeshi players.

The dance and rivalry grew again during the 2022 Asia Cup held in the UAE. On 1 September 2022, Sri Lanka played against Bangladesh in another must-win situation after being thumped by Afghanistan. Bangladesh batted first in batting-friendly Dubai and scored 183. In reply, Sri Lanka lost wickets in regular intervals, leaving 25 needed in 12 balls to win the game. After scoring 17 runs in the 19th over, Bangladesh had to keep five fielders in the circle due to the slow over rate rule. Sri Lanka eventually won the match with three balls to spare. Chamika Karunaratne, who was in the dressing room, posed naagin dance towards the camera after the win.

=== Timed out incident ===
The two nations headlined again during the 2023 Cricket World Cup in India. Sri Lanka went through the qualifying tournament, and Bangladesh had the automatic qualification for the World Cup. Until this, Sri Lanka won all the matches in the world cup against Bangladesh by large margins. On 9 November 2023, Bangladesh asked Sri Lanka to bat first in Delhi. Sri Lanka was 135 for 4 in 24 overs and was looking to set a good total. At this time, veteran Angelo Mathews came to the crease after the wicket of Sadeera Samarawickrama. However, Mathews faced a helmet malfunction and asked for a new helmet chin strap in the innings. At this time, Bangladesh skipper Shakib Al Hasan asked the umpires for Timed Out dismissal. Mathews came to bat a minute and 10 seconds after Samarawickrama's dismissal and met the non-striker Charith Asalanka to exchange a quick word. Meanwhile, Richard Illingworth informed Mathews that he had 30 seconds left. At this time, Mathews had the helmet malfunction.

After a long discussion among the on-field umpires (Illingworth and Marais), reserve umpire Adrian Holdstock and TV umpire Nitin Menon, Mathews was declared out in Timed Out. Mathews then asked to use the 'common sense' of having equipment malfunction to both umpires and Bangladesh skipper, but no one reversed the decision. Mathews left the field as the first international cricketer to be out in Timed Out. By the time Mathews got a new helmet, about two-and-a-half minutes had passed according to the officials. When bowling, Mathews dismissed Shakib and gestures to his wrist, now known as "Time Out celebration".

After the match, several current and former players criticised Shakib's option on Time Out, including Bangladesh fast bowling coach Allan Donald. In the post-match media presentation, both Mathews and Shakib explained the incident, where Shakib said it was all under the law and nothing beyond that. Meanwhile, Mathews stated that he had lost all respect for Shakib and only Bangladesh could have done such a thing, as well as making video evidence to prove that he was within the time in helmet malfunction.

The events also caused more chaos on social media, leaving many fans outrageous.

In 2024, Sri Lanka toured Bangladesh for a complete tour. In the first T20I match, Bangladeshi pacer Shoriful Islam mimics Angelo Mathews with 'Time Out celebration' after the dismissal. After winning the T20I series 2–1, Sri Lankan players made timed-out gesture in posing the camera with the trophy. After that incident, Bangladesh skipper Najmul Hossain Shanto stated that the Sri Lanka team needs to move on from the Timed out incident. However, after winning the ODI series 2–1, Bangladeshi player Mushfiqur Rahim gestured helmet malfunction during winning celebrations.

== Other incidences ==
- Liton Das and Lahiru Kumara were fined after a heated on-field conversation during the pool match in 2021 ICC Men's T20 World Cup.
- Sri Lanka captain Dasun Shanaka spoke in the media that Bangladesh were "an easier opponent" because they did not have world-class bowlers barring Shakib and Mustafizur Rahman before the 2022 Asia Cup match.
- Bangladesh's team director Khaled Mahmud responded to Shanaka, by saying that "Sri Lanka did not have any world-class bowlers, we have two".
- In reply to Mahmud's comment, former cricketer Mahela Jayawardene wrote on Twitter, "Looks like it's time for Sri Lanka bowlers to show the class and batters to show who they are on the field."

== Results ==
As of 20 September 2025

The two sides have played a total of 108 times. Sri Lanka has won 77 matches compared to Bangladesh's 23 victories. In Test matches and ODIs, Sri Lanka has won more matches than Bangladesh, although Bangladesh has won close encounters in Twenty20 Internationals.

Format	Matches played	Sri Lanka won	Bangladesh won	Draw/Tie/No Result
Test	28	**21**	1	6
ODI	60	**45**	13	2
T20I	22	**13**	9	0
Total	108	77	23	8

- **Bold** indicates most wins.

=== ICC matches ===
Sri Lanka has won three meetings at the ICC Cricket World Cups, in 2003, 2007, and 2015, whereas Bangladesh won the latest meeting in 2023. This makes the scoreline 3–1 in Sri Lanka's favour at ODI World Cups.

In the T20 World Cups also, Sri Lanka has a superior record, where they won two outings in 2007 and 2021. However, Bangladesh registered its first-ever win against Sri Lanka in a T20 World Cup group D match during the 2024 ICC Men's T20 World Cup.

Sri Lanka won the only time they faced each other in the Champions Trophy.

Tournament	Matches played	Sri Lanka won	Bangladesh won	Draw/Tie/No Result
World Cup	5	**3**	1	1
T20 World Cup	3	**2**	1	0
Champions Trophy	1	**1**	0	0
World Test Championship	6	**4**	0	2
Total	15	10	2	3

=== ACC matches ===
The teams have met on 20 occasions in the Asia Cup, in both ODI and T20I format matches. Sri Lanka has won 16 of these meetings compared to Bangladesh's 4 victories.

Tournament	Matches played	Sri Lanka won	Bangladesh won	Draw/Tie/No Result
Asia Cup ODI	15	**13**	2	0
Asia Cup Twenty20	4	**2**	2	0
Asian Test Championship	1	**1**	0	0
Total	20	16	4	0

== ICC tournaments won ==
The two countries have played in the Cricket World Cup, and the Twenty20 World Cup, all of which are organized by the governing body of world cricket, the International Cricket Council. Sri Lanka has won 3 ICC tournaments compared to none for Bangladesh. At the senior level, Sri Lanka has won 3 ICC trophies (1 Cricket World Cup, 1 T20 World Cup, 1 Champions Trophy), while Bangladesh have none in their world cup appearances.

Sri Lanka won the ICC Cricket World Cup in 1996, and Bangladesh's best-ever performance came in 2015 when they reached the quarterfinals. Sri Lanka has won the ICC Men's T20 World Cup in 2014, while Bangladesh has won none. In the ICC Champions Trophy, another ODI tournament, Sri Lanka won the trophy in 2002, while Bangladesh reached the semi-finals in 2017. Neither team has won the World Test Championship.

Tournament	Sri Lanka	Bangladesh
ICC Cricket World Cup	1	0
ICC T20 World Cup	1	0
ICC Champions Trophy	1	0
ICC World Test Championship	0	0
Total	3	0

== ACC tournaments Won ==
Sri Lanka has participated in all 16 editions of the Asia Cups hosted, winning 6 trophies. Bangladesh did not qualify for the inaugural edition of the Asia Cup in 1984. Sri Lanka also won the Asian Test Championship once.

Tournament	Sri Lanka	Bangladesh
ACC Asia Cup (ODI)	5	0
ACC Asia Cup (T20I)	1	0
Asian Test Championship	1	0
Total	7	0

== List of Test series ==
The two teams have played 28 Test matches since 2001, where Sri Lanka has won 21 matches and Bangladesh won a single match.

=== Overall Test match results ===
Decade	Matches	Result		
Decade	Matches	Sri Lanka	Bangladesh	Drawn
2000s	12	12	0	0
2010s	8	4	1	3
2020s	8	5	0	3
Total	28	21	1	6
Statistics are correct as of 3rd Test Sri Lanka v Bangladesh at SSC Cricket Ground, Colombo; 25–28 June 2025

Fourteen Test series have been played between the two sides. Sri Lanka has hosted eight of the series, with 16 matches played at home. Bangladesh has hosted six series with 12 matches played at home. Sri Lanka has dominated with 13 series wins; Bangladesh has never won a bilateral test series played between the two countries.

Season	Host	Date first Test started	Tests	Sri Lanka won	Bangladesh won	Drawn	Winner	Note
2001–02	(Sri Lanka)	6 September 2001	1	1	0	0	Sri Lanka	
2002	(Sri Lanka)	21 July 2002	2	2	0	0	Sri Lanka	
2005	(Sri Lanka)	12 September 2005	2	2	0	0	Sri Lanka	
2005–06	(Bangladesh)	28 February 2006	2	2	0	0	Sri Lanka	
2007	(Sri Lanka)	25 June 2007	3	3	0	0	Sri Lanka	
2008–09	(Bangladesh)	26 December 2008	2	2	0	0	Sri Lanka	
2012–13	(Sri Lanka)	8 March 2013	2	1	0	1	Sri Lanka	
2013–14	(Bangladesh)	27 January 2014	2	1	0	1	Sri Lanka	
2016–17	(Sri Lanka)	7 March 2017	2	1	1	0	Drawn	
2017–18	(Bangladesh)	31 January 2018	2	1	0	1	Sri Lanka	
2020–21	(Sri Lanka)	21 April 2021	2	1	0	1	Sri Lanka	2019–21 WTC
2022	(Bangladesh)	15 May 2022	2	1	0	1	Sri Lanka	2021–23 WTC
2023–24	(Bangladesh)	22 March 2024	2	2	0	0	Sri Lanka	2023–25 WTC
2025	(Sri Lanka)	17 June 2025	2	1	0	1	Sri Lanka	2025–27 WTC
Total	14		28	21	1	6		

== List of ODI series ==
=== Overall ODI match results ===
The two teams have played 60 ODI matches since 1986, where Sri Lanka has won 45 matches and Bangladesh has won 13 matches.

Decade	Matches	Result		
Decade	Matches	Sri Lanka	Bangladesh	No result
1980s	2	2	0	0
1990s	3	3	0	0
2000s	21	19	2	0
2010s	22	15	5	2
2020s	12	6	6	0
Total	60	45	13	2
Statistics are correct as of Sri Lanka v Bangladesh: 3rd ODI at Pallekele International Cricket Stadium, Kandy; 8 July 2025

The two sides have played a total of 11 bilateral ODI series. Other than that, the two sides also met in 12 Asia Cups, 3 tri-nation series, and 5 ICC multinational series. Out of 11 bilateral series, seven of these have been played in Sri Lanka, while Bangladesh has hosted four series. Overall, Sri Lanka has won 7 of the series, with Bangladesh winning two as well as 2 drawn series.

=== Bilateral ODI series results ===
Season	Host	Date of first match	Matches	Sri Lanka won	Bangladesh won	Tie/No Result	Winner	Note
2002	(Sri Lanka)	4 August 2002	3	3	0	0	Sri Lanka	
2005	(Sri Lanka)	31 August 2005	3	3	0	0	Sri Lanka	
2005–06	(Bangladesh)	20 February 2006	3	2	1	0	Sri Lanka	
2007	(Sri Lanka)	20 July 2007	3	3	0	0	Sri Lanka	
2008–09	(Bangladesh)	25 June 2008	2	1	1	0	Sri Lanka	Tri-Series
2009–10	(Bangladesh)	25 June 2008	2	2	0	0	Sri Lanka	
2012–13	(Sri Lanka)	23 March 2013	3	1	1	1	Drawn	
2013–14	(Bangladesh)	17 February 2014	3	3	0	0	Sri Lanka	
2016–17	(Sri Lanka)	25 March 2017	3	1	1	1	Drawn	
2017–18	(Bangladesh)	19 January 2018	3	2	1	0	Sri Lanka	Tri-Series
2019	(Sri Lanka)	26 July 2019	3	3	0	0	Sri Lanka	
2021	(Bangladesh)	23 May 2021	3	1	2	0	Bangladesh	
2023–24	(Bangladesh)	13 March 2024	3	1	2	0	Bangladesh	
2025	(Sri Lanka)	2 July 2025	3	2	1	0	Sri Lanka	
Total	14		40	28	10	2		

=== Champions Trophy results ===
Year	Host	Stage	Venue		Result	Player of the match
2006	(India)	Qualifying Round	Mohali		(Sri Lanka) won by 37 runs	(Sri Lanka) Upul Tharanga
Summary
Tournaments		Matches	(Sri Lanka) won	(Bangladesh) won	Tie/No result	—N/a
1		1	1	0	0	—

=== Cricket World Cup results ===
Year	Host	Stage	Venue		Result	Player of the match
2003	(South Africa)	Group Stage	Pietermaritzburg		(Sri Lanka) won by 10 wickets	(Sri Lanka) Chaminda Vaas
2007	(Trinidad and Tobago)	Group Stage	Port of Spain		(Sri Lanka) won by 198 runs (DLS)	(Sri Lanka) Sanath Jayasuriya
2015	(Australia)	Group Stage	Melbourne		(Sri Lanka) won by 92 runs	(Sri Lanka) Tillakaratne Dilshan
2023	(India)	Group Stage	New Delhi		(Bangladesh) won by 3 wickets	(Bangladesh) Shakib Al Hasan
2027	(South Africa)	Group Stage	Durban		To be played	
Summary
Tournaments		Matches	(Sri Lanka) won	(Bangladesh) won	Tie/No result	—N/a
4		4	3	1	0	—

=== Asia Cup (ODI) results ===
Year	Host	Stage	Venue		Result	Player of the match
1986	(Sri Lanka)	Group Stage	Kandy		(Sri Lanka) won by 7 wickets	(Sri Lanka) Asanka Gurusinha
1988	(Bangladesh)	Group Stage	Dhaka		(Sri Lanka) won by 9 wickets	(Sri Lanka) Brendon Kuruppu
1990–91	(India)	Group Stage	Kolkata		(Sri Lanka) won by 71 runs	(Bangladesh) Athar Ali Khan
1995	(United Arab Emirates)	Group Stage	Sharjah		(Sri Lanka) won by 107 runs	(Sri Lanka) Arjuna Ranatunga
1997	(Sri Lanka)	Group Stage	Colombo (SSC)		(Sri Lanka) won by 103 runs	(Sri Lanka) Sanath Jayasuriya
2000	(Bangladesh)	Group Stage	Dhaka		(Sri Lanka) won by 9 wickets	(Sri Lanka) Aravinda de Silva
2004	(Sri Lanka)	Super Fours	Colombo (RPS)		(Sri Lanka) won by 10 wickets	(Sri Lanka) Sanath Jayasuriya
2008	(Pakistan)	Group Stage	Lahore		(Sri Lanka) won by 131 runs	(Sri Lanka) Kumar Sangakkara
2008	(Pakistan)	Super Fours	Karachi		(Sri Lanka) by 158 runs	(Sri Lanka) Sanath Jayasuriya
2010	(Sri Lanka)	Group Stage	Dambulla		(Sri Lanka) won by 126 runs	(Sri Lanka) Tillakaratne Dilshan
2012	(Bangladesh)	Group Stage	Mirpur		(Bangladesh) won by 5 wickets (DLS)	(Bangladesh) Shakib Al Hasan
2014	(Bangladesh)	Group Stage	Mirpur		(Sri Lanka) won by 3 wickets	(Sri Lanka) Angelo Mathews
2018	(United Arab Emirates)	Group Stage	Dubai		(Bangladesh) won by 137 runs	(Bangladesh) Mushfiqur Rahim
2023	(Sri Lanka)	Group Stage	Pallekele		(Sri Lanka) won by 5 wickets	(Sri Lanka) Matheesha Pathirana
2023	(Sri Lanka)	Super Fours	Colombo (RPS)		(Sri Lanka) won by 21 runs	(Sri Lanka) Sadeera Samarawickrama
Summary
Tournaments		Matches	(Sri Lanka) won	(Bangladesh) won	Tie/No result	—N/a
13		15	13	2	0	—

== List of T20I results ==
=== Overall T20I match results ===
The two teams have played 21 T20I matches since 2007, where Sri Lanka has won 13 matches and Bangladesh won 8 matches.

Decade	Matches	Result		
Decade	Matches	Sri Lanka	Bangladesh	Tie/No result
2000s	1	1	0	0
2010s	10	6	4	0
2020s	12	7	5	0
Total	23	14	9	0
Statistics are correct as of Sri Lanka v Bangladesh: Asian Games at Kōrogi Athletic Park, Nisshin; 3 October 2026

The two sides have played a total of 6 bilateral T20I series. Other than that, the two sides also met in 3 Asia cups, 1 tri-nation series and 3 ICC multinational series. Out of 6 bilateral series, three of these have been played in Sri Lanka, while Bangladesh has hosted three series. Overall, Sri Lanka has won 4 series, two Twenty20 World Cup matches and two Asia Cup meetings, whereas Bangladesh has won a single series, both meetings at the tri-nation series, two Asia Cup meetings and one Twenty20 World Cup match.

=== Bilateral T20I series results ===
Year(s)	Host	Date of first match	Matches	Sri Lanka won	Bangladesh won	Tie/No Result	Winner	Note
2012–13	(Sri Lanka)	31 March 2013	1	1	0	0	Sri Lanka	
2013–14	(Bangladesh)	12 February 2014	2	2	0	0	Sri Lanka	
2016–17	(Sri Lanka)	4 April 2017	2	1	1	0	Drawn	
2017–18	(Bangladesh)	15 February 2018	2	2	0	0	Sri Lanka	
2018	(Sri Lanka)	10 March 2018	2	0	2	0	Bangladesh	Tri-Series
2023–24	(Bangladesh)	4 March 2024	3	2	1	0	Sri Lanka	
2025	(Sri Lanka)	10 July 2025	3	1	2	0	Bangladesh	
Total	7		15	9	6	0		

=== ICC Men's T20 World Cup results ===
Year	Host	Stage	Venue		Result	Player of the match
2007	(South Africa)	Group Stage	Johannesburg		(Sri Lanka) won by 64 runs	(Sri Lanka) Dilhara Fernando
2021	(United Arab Emirates)	Super Twelve	Sharjah		(Sri Lanka) won by 5 wickets	(Sri Lanka) Charith Asalanka
2024	(United States)	Group Stage	Grand Prairie		(Bangladesh) won by 2 wickets	(Bangladesh) Rishad Hossain
Summary
Tournaments		Matches	(Sri Lanka) won	(Bangladesh) won	Tie/No result	—N/a
3		3	2	1	0	—

=== Asia Cup (T20I) results ===
Year	Host	Stage	Venue		Result	Player of the match
2016	(Bangladesh)	Group Stage	Mirpur		(Bangladesh) won by 23 runs	(Bangladesh) Sabbir Rahman
2022	(United Arab Emirates)	Group Stage	Dubai		(Sri Lanka) won by 2 wickets	(Sri Lanka) Kusal Mendis
2025	(United Arab Emirates)	Group Stage	Abu Dhabi		(Sri Lanka) won by 6 wickets	(Sri Lanka) Kamil Mishara
2025	(United Arab Emirates)	Super Four	Dubai		(Bangladesh) won by 4 wickets	(Bangladesh) Saif Hassan
Summary
Tournaments		Matches	(Sri Lanka) won	(Bangladesh) won	Tie/No result	—N/a
3		4	2	2	0	—

=== Asian Games results ===
Year	Host	Stage	Venue		Result
2026	(Japan)	Bronze medal match	Nisshin		(Sri Lanka) won by 63 runs
Summary
Tournaments		Matches	(Sri Lanka) won	(Bangladesh) won	Tie/No result
1		1	1	0	0

== Test records ==
=== Team records ===
==== Most runs in an innings ====
Runs	Team	Venue	Season
730/6d	Sri Lanka	Mirpur	2013–14
713/9d	Sri Lanka	Chattogram	2017–18
648/8d	Sri Lanka	Pallekele	2021
638	Bangladesh	Galle	2012–13
587	Sri Lanka	Chattogram	2013–14

==== Fewest runs in a completed innings ====
Runs	Team	Venue	Season
62	Bangladesh	Colombo (PSS)	2007
86	Bangladesh	Colombo (RPS)	2005
89	Bangladesh	Colombo (SSC)	2007
90	Bangladesh	Colombo (SSC)	2007
110	Bangladesh	Mirpur	2017–18

==== Greatest win margins (by innings) ====
Margin	Winning team	Venue	Season
Innings and 248 runs	Sri Lanka	Mirpur	2013–14
Innings and 234 runs	Sri Lanka	Colombo (SSC)	2007
Innings and 196 runs	Sri Lanka	Colombo (PSS)	2002
Innings and 193 runs	Sri Lanka	Kandy	2007
Innings and 137 runs	Sri Lanka	Colombo (SSC)	2001–02

==== Greatest win margins (by runs) ====
Margin	Winning team	Venue	Season
465 runs	Sri Lanka	Chattogram	2008–09
328 runs	Sri Lanka	Sylhet	2023–24
288 runs	Sri Lanka	Colombo (SSC)	2002
259 runs	Sri Lanka	Galle	2016–17
215 runs	Sri Lanka	Mirpur	2017–18

==== Smallest victories (by runs) ====
Margin	Winning team	Venue	Season
107 runs	Sri Lanka	Mirpur	2008–09
192 runs	Sri Lanka	Chattogram	2023–24
209 runs	Sri Lanka	Pallekele	2021
215 runs	Sri Lanka	Mirpur	2017–18
259 runs	Sri Lanka	Galle	2016–17

==== Smallest victories (by wickets) ====
Margin	Winning team	Venue	Season
4 wickets	Bangladesh	Colombo (PSS)	2016–17
7 wickets	Sri Lanka	Colombo (RPS)	2012–13
8 wickets	Sri Lanka	Chattogram	2005–06
10 wickets	Sri Lanka	Bogra	2005–06
10 wickets	Sri Lanka	Mirpur	2022

=== Individual records ===
==== Most runs ====
Runs	Player	Span
1,816 (21 innings)	(Sri Lanka) Kumar Sangakkara	2001–2014
1,619 (34 innings)	(Bangladesh) Mushfiqur Rahim	2006–2025
1,159 (22 innings)	(Sri Lanka) Dinesh Chandimal	2013–2025
1,149 (28 innings)	(Bangladesh) Mominul Haque	2013–2025
1,146 (17 innings)	(Sri Lanka) Mahela Jayawardene	2001–2014

==== Highest individual score ====
Runs	Player	Venue	Date
319	(Sri Lanka) Kumar Sangakkara	Chattogram	4 February 2014
244	(Sri Lanka) Dimuth Karunaratne	Pallekele	21 April 2021
222*	(Sri Lanka) Kumar Sangakkara	Kandy	11 July 2007
206	(Sri Lanka) Aravinda de Silva	Colombo (PSS)	21 July 2007
203*	(Sri Lanka) Mahela Jayawardene	Mirpur	27 January 2014

==== Most career wickets ====
Wickets	Player	Matches	Average
89	(Sri Lanka) Muttiah Muralitharan	11	13.37
50	(Sri Lanka) Rangana Herath	10	24.76
42	(Bangladesh) Shakib Al Hasan	10	37.23
30	(Bangladesh) Taijul Islam	9	44.26
28	(Sri Lanka) Dilhara Fernando	8	19.28

==== Best bowling figures in an innings ====
Bowling	Player	Venue	Date
7/89	(Sri Lanka) Rangana Herath	Colombo (RPS)	16 March 2013
6/18	(Sri Lanka) Muttiah Muralitharan	Colombo (RPS)	12 September 2005
6/28	(Sri Lanka) Muttiah Muralitharan	Kandy	11 July 2007
6/49	(Sri Lanka) Muttiah Muralitharan	Mirpur	26 December 2008
6/51	(Sri Lanka) Asitha Fernando	Mirpur	23 May 2022

== One Day International records ==
=== Team records ===
==== Highest innings total ====
Runs	Team	Venue	Season
357/9	Sri Lanka	Lahore	2008
332/8	Sri Lanka	Karachi	2008
332/1	Sri Lanka	Melbourne	2014–15
324/5	Bangladesh	Dambulla	2016–17
320/7	Bangladesh	Mirpur	2017–18

==== Lowest innings total ====
Runs	Team	Venue	Season
76	Bangladesh	Colombo (SSC)	2002
82	Bangladesh	Mirpur	2017–18
108	Bangladesh	Colombo (RPS)	2005
112	Bangladesh	Port of Spain	2006–07
118/8	Bangladesh	Dhaka	1988–89

==== Largest victory ====
Margin	Winning team	Venue	Season
198 runs	Sri Lanka	Port of Spain	2006–07
163 runs	Bangladesh	Mirpur	2017–18
158 runs	Sri Lanka	Karachi	2008
137 runs	Bangladesh	Dubai	2018
131 runs	Sri Lanka	Lahore	2008

==== Smallest victory ====
Margin	Winning team	Venue	Season
13 runs	Sri Lanka	Mirpur	2013–14
16 runs	Bangladesh	Colombo (RPS)	2025
21 runs	Sri Lanka	Colombo (RPS)	2023
33 runs	Bangladesh	Mirpur	2021
37 runs	Sri Lanka	Mirpur	2006–07

=== Individual records ===
==== Most runs ====
Runs	Player	Span
1,207 (37 innings)	(Bangladesh) Mushfiqur Rahim	2007–2024
1,206 (28 innings)	(Sri Lanka) Kumar Sangakkara	2002–2015
1,030 (21 innings)	(Sri Lanka) Sanath Jayasuriya	1990–2009
906 (22 innings)	(Sri Lanka) Upul Tharanga	2005–2018
859 (21 innings)	(Sri Lanka) Tillakaratne Dilshan	2002–2015

==== Highest individual score ====
Runs	Player	Venue	Date
161*	(Sri Lanka) Tillakaratne Dilshan	Melbourne	26 February 2015
144	(Bangladesh) Mushfiqur Rahim	Dubai	15 September 2018
130	(Sri Lanka) Sanath Jayasuriya	Karachi	30 June 2008
128	(Sri Lanka) Kumar Sangakkara	Mirpur	20 February 2014
127	(Bangladesh) Tamim Iqbal	Dambulla	25 March 2017

==== Most career wickets ====
Wickets	Player	Matches	Average
31	(Sri Lanka) Muttiah Muralitharan	17	17.22
27	(Sri Lanka) Lasith Malinga	15	16.55
26	(Bangladesh) Taskin Ahmed	14	26.46
26	(Bangladesh) Mashrafe Mortaza	22	37.15
24	(Bangladesh) Mustafizur Rahman	16	25.29

==== Best bowling figures in an innings ====
Bowling	Player	Venue	Date
6/25	(Sri Lanka) Chaminda Vaas	Pietermaritzburg	14 February 2003
5/16	(Sri Lanka) Dushmantha Chameera	Mirpur	28 May 2021
5/31	(Sri Lanka) Muttiah Muralitharan	Karachi	30 June 2008
5/39	(Bangladesh) Tanvir Islam	Colombo (RPS)	5 July 2025
5/62	(Bangladesh) Abdur Razzak	Pallekele	28 March 2013

== Twenty20 International records ==
=== Team records ===
==== Highest innings total ====
Runs	Team	Venue	Season
215/5	Bangladesh	Colombo (RPS)	2017–18
214/6	Sri Lanka	Colombo (RPS)	2017–18
210/4	Sri Lanka	Sylhet	2017–18
206/3	Sri Lanka	Sylhet	2023–24
203/8	Bangladesh	Sylhet	2023–24

==== Lowest innings total ====
Runs	Team	Venue	Season
83	Bangladesh	Johannesburg	2007–08
94	Sri Lanka	Dambulla	2024–25
120	Bangladesh	Chattogram	2013–14
123/7	Sri Lanka	Chattogram	2013–14
124/8	Sri Lanka	Mirpur	2015–16

==== Largest victory ====
Margin	Winning team	Venue	Season
75 runs	Sri Lanka	Sylhet	2017–18
64 runs	Sri Lanka	Johannesburg	2007–08
45 runs	Bangladesh	Colombo (RPS)	2016–17
28 runs	Sri Lanka	Sylhet	2023–24
23 runs	Bangladesh	Mirpur	2015–16

==== Smallest victory ====
Margin	Winning team	Venue	Season
2 runs	Sri Lanka	Chattogram	2013–14
3 runs	Sri Lanka	Sylhet	2023–24
17 runs	Sri Lanka	Pallekele	2012–13
23 runs	Bangladesh	Mirpur	2015–16
28 runs	Sri Lanka	Sylhet	2023–24

=== Individual records ===
==== Most runs ====
Runs	Player	Span
566 (14 innings)	(Sri Lanka) Kusal Mendis	2018–2025
415 (13 innings)	(Sri Lanka) Kusal Perera	2013–2025
368 (15 innings)	(Bangladesh) Mahmudullah	2007–2024
303 (12 innings)	(Bangladesh) Litton Das	2018–2025
300 (11 innings)	(Bangladesh) Mushfiqur Rahim	2007–2022

==== Highest individual score ====
Runs	Player	Venue	Date
86	(Sri Lanka) Kusal Mendis	Sylhet	9 March 2024
80*	(Sri Lanka) Charith Asalanka	Sharjah	24 October 2021
80	(Bangladesh) Sabbir Rahman	Mirpur	28 February 2016
77	(Sri Lanka) Kusal Perera	Colombo (RPS)	4 April 2017
74*	(Sri Lanka) Kusal Perera	Colombo (RPS)	10 March 2018

==== Most career wickets ====
Wickets	Player	Matches	Average
23	(Bangladesh) Mustafizur Rahman	17	22.17
14	(Sri Lanka) Nuwan Thushara	7	12.28
12	(Bangladesh) Shakib Al Hasan	10	18.16
11	(Sri Lanka) Lasith Malinga	6	14.63
11	(Bangladesh) Taskin Ahmed	10	29.45

==== Best bowling figures in an innings ====
Bowling	Player	Venue	Date
5/20	(Sri Lanka) Nuwan Thushara	Sylhet	9 March 2024
4/18	(Sri Lanka) Nuwan Thushara	Dallas	7 June 2024
4/21	(Bangladesh) Mustafizur Rahman	Colombo (RPS)	6 April 2017
3/17	(Bangladesh) Mustafizur Rahman	Dallas	7 June 2024
3/20	(Sri Lanka) Lasith Malinga	Chattogram	14 February 2014

== Miscellaneous records ==
=== Hat tricks ===
Format	Bowler	Dismissed batsmen	Venue	Date	Result	Ref.
ODI	(Sri Lanka) Chaminda Vaas	Hannan Sarkar (b); Mohammad Ashraful (c&b); Ehsanul Haque (c Mahela Jayawardene)	Pietermaritzburg	14 February 2003	Won	
ODI	(Bangladesh) Taskin Ahmed	Asela Gunaratne (c Soumya Sarkar); Suranga Lakmal (c Mustafizur Rahman); Nuwan Pradeep (b)	Dambulla	28 March 2017	No result	
ODI	(Sri Lanka) Shehan Madushanka	Mashrafe Mortaza (c Kusal Mendis); Rubel Hossain (b); Mahmudullah (c Upul Tharanga)	Dhaka	27 January 2018	Won	
T20I	(Sri Lanka) Lasith Malinga	Mushfiqur Rahim (b); Mashrafe Mortaza (b); Mehidy Hasan Miraz (lbw)	Colombo (RPS)	6 April 2017	Lost	
T20I	(Sri Lanka) Nuwan Thushara	Najmul Hossain Shanto (b); Towhid Hridoy (b); Mahmudullah (lbw)	Sylhet	9 March 2024	Won	

== See also ==
- Sri Lanka at the Cricket World Cup
- Bangladesh at the Cricket World Cup
- List of sports rivalries
