= Roshan Jurangpathy =

Sri Lankan cricketer (born 1967)

Personal information
- Full name: Baba Roshan Jurangpathy
- Born: 25 June 1967 (age 59); Colombo
- Batting: Right-handed
- Bowling: Right-arm off-break
- Role: All-rounder

International information
- National side: Sri Lanka (1985–1986)
- Test debut (cap 31): 14 September 1985 v India
- Last Test: 27 December 1986 v India

Domestic team information
- Years: Team
- 1989–1992: Colombo Cricket Club

Career statistics
Competition	Test	FC	LA
Matches	2	49	15
Runs scored	1	1,483	164
Batting average	0.25	25.13	12.61
100s/50s	0/0	2/6	0/0
Top score	1	104	36
Balls bowled	150	5,566	464
Wickets	1	104	18
Bowling average	93.00	20.62	16.94
5 wickets in innings	0	2	1
10 wickets in match	0	0	0
Best bowling	1/69	6/44	5/20
Catches/stumpings	2/–	27/–	8/–
- Source: Cricinfo, 20 September 2016

Baba Roshan Jurangpathy (born 25 June 1967) is a Sri Lankan former Test cricketer. He played his debut Test against India in 1985 at Asgiriya Stadium. India's Mohinder Amarnath was his only Test wicket. He played in only two Test matches, and finished his career with a batting average of 0.25.
