= Jayantha Amerasinghe =

Sri Lankan cricketer (born 1954)

Jayantha Amerasinghe ජයන්ත අමරසිංහ
Personal information
- Full name: Amerasinghe Mudalige Jayantha Gamini Amerasinghe
- Born: February 2, 1954 (age 72); Colombo, Sri Lanka
- Batting: Right-handed
- Bowling: Slow left-arm orthodox

International information
- National side: Sri Lanka (1984)
- Test debut (cap 25): 9 March 1984 v New Zealand
- Last Test: 24 March 1984 v New Zealand

Career statistics
Competition	Test	First-class
Matches	2	16
Runs scored	54	120
Batting average	18.00	8.00
100s/50s	-/-	-/-
Top score	34	34
Balls bowled	300	3208
Wickets	3	61
Bowling average	50.00	19.60
5 wickets in innings	–	3
10 wickets in match	–	2
Best bowling	2/73	7/82
Catches/stumpings	3/-	7/-
- Source: Cricinfo, 13 April 2016

Amerasinghe Mudalige Jayantha Gamini Amerasinghe (born February 2, 1954, Colombo) is a Sri Lankan former cricketer who played in two Tests in 1984.

== International career ==
Amerasinghe is the only Sri Lankan to top-score for his team in a Test as a number 11 batsman, scoring 34 when Sri Lanka were dismissed for 215 in their first innings by New Zealand in 1984.

Also he was only the second player from any team to top-score for his team in the second innings of a Test as a number 11 batsman, after Bert Vogler of South Africa. Amerasinghe was just the fifth player in Test history to top-score for his team in a Test as a number 11 batsman.
