= List of Sri Lanka Test cricketers =

This is a list of Sri Lankan Test cricketers.

A Test match is an international cricket match between two representative teams that are full members of the International Cricket Council (ICC). Both teams have two innings, and the match lasts up to five days.

The list is arranged in the order in which each player won his first Test cap. Where more than one player won his first Test cap in the same match, those players are listed alphabetically by surname.

== List of Test cricketers ==
Statistics are correct as of 28 June 2025.

Sri Lankan Test cricketers				Batting					Bowling						Fielding	
Cap	Name	Career	Mat	Inn	NO	Runs	HS	Avg	Balls	Mdn	Runs	Wkt	Best	Avg	Ca	St
1	Ashantha de Mel	1982–1986	17	28	5	326	34	14.17	3518	92	2180	59	6/109	36.95	9	–
2	Somachandra de Silva	1982–1984	12	22	3	406	61	21.37	3031	108	1347	37	5/59	36.41	5	–
3	Ajit de Silva	1982	4	7	2	41	14	8.20	962	41	385	7	2/38	55.00	0	–
4	Roy Dias	1982–1987	20	36	1	1285	109	36.71	24	0	17	0	–	–	6	–
5	Mahes Goonatilleke	1982	5	10	2	177	56	22.13	–	–	–	–	–	–	10	3
6	Lalith Kaluperuma	1982	2	4	1	12	11*	4.00	162	4	93	0	–	–	2	–
7	Ranjan Madugalle	1982–1988	21	39	4	1029	103	29.40	84	2	38	0	–	–	9	–
8	Duleep Mendis	1982–1988	24	43	1	1329	124	31.64	–	–	–	–	–	–	9	–
9	Arjuna Ranatunga	1982–2000	93	155	12	5105	135*	35.70	2373	114	1040	16	2/17	65.00	47	–
10	Bandula Warnapura	1982	4	8	0	96	38	12.00	90	4	46	0	–	–	2	–
11	Sidath Wettimuny	1982–1987	23	43	1	1221	190	29.07	24	0	37	0	–	–	10	–
12	Ravi Ratnayeke	1982–1989	22	38	6	807	93	25.22	3833	118	1972	56	8/83	35.21	1	–
13	Anura Ranasinghe	1982	2	4	0	88	77	22.00	114	1	69	1	1/23	69.00	0	–
14	Rohan Jayasekera	1982	1	2	0	2	2	1.00	–	–	–	–	–	–	0	–
15	Roger Wijesuriya	1982–1985	4	7	2	22	8	4.40	586	23	294	1	1/68	294.00	1	–
16	Guy de Alwis	1983–1988	11	19	0	152	28	8.00	–	–	–	–	–	–	21	2
17	Susil Fernando	1983–1984	5	10	0	112	46	11.20	–	–	–	–	–	–	0	–
18	Yohan Goonasekera	1983	2	4	0	48	23	12.00	–	–	–	–	–	–	6	–
19	Sridharan Jeganathan	1983	2	4	0	19	8	4.75	30	2	12	0	–	–	0	–
20	Vinothen John	1983–1984	6	10	5	53	27*	10.60	1281	53	614	28	5/60	21.93	2	–
21	Rumesh Ratnayake	1983–1992	23	36	6	433	56	14.43	4961	136	2563	73	6/66	35.11	9	–
22	Mithra Wettimuny	1983	2	4	0	28	17	7.00	–	–	–	–	–	–	2	–
23	Amal Silva	1983–1988	9	16	2	353	111	25.21	–	–	–	–	–	–	33	1
24	Roshan Guneratne	1983	1	2	2	0	0*	–	102	1	84	0	–	–	0	–
25	Jayantha Amerasinghe	1984	2	4	1	54	34	18.00	300	9	150	3	2/73	50.00	3	–
26	Sanath Kaluperuma	1984–1988	4	8	0	88	23	11.00	240	8	124	2	2/17	62.00	6	–
27	Aravinda de Silva	1984–2002	93	159	11	6361	267	42.98	2595	77	1208	29	3/30	41.66	43	–
28	Saliya Ahangama	1985	3	3	1	11	11	5.50	801	32	348	18	5/52	19.33	1	–
29	Asoka de Silva	1985–1991	10	16	4	185	50	15.42	2328	87	1032	8	2/67	129.00	4	–
30	Sanjeewa Weerasinghe	1985	1	1	0	3	3	3.00	114	8	36	0	–	–	0	–
31	Roshan Jurangpathy	1985–1986	2	4	0	1	1	0.25	150	3	93	1	1/69	93.00	2	–
32	Asanka Gurusinha	1985–1996	41	70	7	2452	143	38.92	1408	47	681	20	2/7	34.05	33	–
33	Jayananda Warnaweera	1986–1994	10	12	3	39	20	4.33	2333	90	1021	32	4/25	31.91	0	–
34	Don Anurasiri	1986–1998	18	22	5	91	24	5.35	3973	152	1548	41	4/71	37.76	4	–
35	Kosala Kuruppuarachchi	1986–1987	2	2	2	0	0*	–	272	6	149	8	5/44	18.63	0	–
36	Roshan Mahanama	1986–1998	52	89	1	2576	225	29.27	36	0	30	0	–	–	56	–
37	Kaushik Amalean	1986–1988	2	3	2	9	7*	9.00	244	2	156	7	4/97	22.29	1	–
38	Graeme Labrooy	1986–1991	9	14	3	158	70*	14.36	2158	58	1194	27	5/133	44.22	3	-
39	Brendon Kuruppu	1987–1991	4	7	1	320	201*	53.33	–	–	–	–	–	–	1	–
40	Champaka Ramanayake	1988–1993	18	24	9	143	34*	9.53	3654	109	1880	44	5/82	42.73	6	–
41	Ranjith Madurasinghe	1988–1992	3	6	1	24	11	4.80	396	12	172	3	3/60	57.33	0	–
42	Athula Samarasekera	1988–1991	4	7	0	118	57	16.86	192	5	104	3	2/38	34.67	3	–
43	Dammika Ranatunga	1989	2	3	0	87	45	29.00	–	–	–	–	–	–	0	–
44	Gamini Wickremasinghe	1989–1992	3	3	1	17	13*	8.50	–	–	–	–	–	–	9	1
45	Hashan Tillakaratne	1989–2004	83	131	25	4545	204*	42.88	76	4	25	0	–	–	122	2
46	Marvan Atapattu	1990–2007	90	156	15	5502	249	39.02	48	0	24	1	1/9	24.00	58	–
47	Charith Senanayake	1991	3	5	0	97	64	19.40	–	–	–	–	–	–	2	–
48	Chandika Hathurusingha	1991–1999	26	44	1	1274	83	29.63	1962	99	789	17	4/66	46.41	7	–
49	Sanath Jayasuriya	1991–2007	110	188	14	6973	340	40.07	8188	323	3366	98	5/34	34.34	78	–
50	Kapila Wijegunawardene	1991–1992	2	4	1	14	6*	4.67	364	16	147	7	4/51	21.00	0	–
51	Pramodya Wickramasinghe	1991–2001	40	64	5	555	51	9.41	7260	248	3559	85	6/60	41.87	18	–
52	Romesh Kaluwitharana	1992–2004	49	78	4	1933	132*	26.12	–	–	–	–	–	–	93	26
53	Dulip Liyanage	1992–2001	9	9	0	69	23	7.67	1355	47	666	17	4/56	39.18	0	–
54	Muttiah Muralitharan	1992–2010	132 (Note: Muttiah Muralitharan also played one Test match for the ICC World XI. Only his record for Sri Lanka is given here.)	162	56	1259	67	11.87	43715	1786	18023	795	9/51	22.67	70	–
55	Ashley de Silva	1993	3	3	0	10	9	3.33	–	–	–	–	–	–	4	1
56	Ruwan Kalpage	1993–1999	11	18	2	294	63	18.38	1576	49	774	12	2/27	64.50	10	–
57	Pubudu Dassanayake	1993–1994	11	17	2	196	36	13.07	–	–	–	–	–	–	19	5
58	Piyal Wijetunge	1993	1	2	0	10	10	5.00	312	5	118	2	1/58	59.00	0	–
59	Kumar Dharmasena	1993–2004	31	51	7	868	62*	19.73	6939	265	2920	69	6/72	42.32	14	–
60	Dulip Samaraweera	1993–1995	7	14	0	211	42	15.07	–	–	–	–	–	–	5	–
61	Ravindra Pushpakumara	1994–2001	23	31	12	166	44	8.74	3792	98	2242	58	7/116	38.66	10	–
62	Chaminda Vaas	1994–2009	111	162	35	3089	100*	24.32	23438	895	10501	355	7/71	29.58	31	–
63	Sanjeeva Ranatunga	1994–1997	9	17	1	531	118	33.19	–	–	–	–	–	–	2	–
64	Chamara Dunusinghe	1995	5	10	0	160	91	16.00	–	–	–	–	–	–	13	2
65	Jayantha Silva	1995–1998	7	4	1	6	6*	2.00	1533	72	647	20	4/16	32.35	1	–
66	Nuwan Zoysa	1997–2004	30	40	6	288	28*	8.47	4422	160	2157	64	5/20	33.70	4	–
67	Sajeewa de Silva	1997–1999	8	12	5	65	27	9.29	1585	42	889	16	5/85	55.56	5	–
68	Russel Arnold	1997–2004	44	69	4	1821	123	28.02	1334	45	598	11	3/76	54.36	51	–
69	Mahela Jayawardene	1997–2014	149	252	15	11814	374	49.84	589	20	310	6	2/32	51.66	205	–
70	Lanka de Silva	1997	3	4	2	36	20*	18.00	–	–	–	–	–	–	1	–
71	Malinga Bandara	1998–2006	8	11	3	124	43	15.50	1152	29	633	16	3/84	39.56	4	–
72	Niroshan Bandaratilleke	1998–2001	7	9	1	93	25	11.63	1722	83	698	23	5/36	30.35	0	–
73	Suresh Perera	1998–2001	3	4	1	77	43*	25.67	408	12	180	1	1/104	180.00	1	–
74	Ruchira Perera	1999–2002	8	9	6	33	11*	11.00	1130	31	661	17	3/40	38.88	2	–
75	Eric Upashantha	1999–2002	2	3	0	10	6	3.33	306	5	200	4	2/41	50.00	0	–
76	Avishka Gunawardene	1999–2005	6	11	0	181	43	16.45	–	–	–	–	–	–	2	–
77	Upul Chandana	1999–2005	16	24	1	616	92	26.78	2685	64	1535	37	6/179	41.49	7	–
78	Rangana Herath	1999–2018	93	144	28	1699	80*	14.64	25993	814	12157	433	9/127	28.07	24	–
79	Tillakaratne Dilshan	1999–2013	87	145	11	5492	193	40.98	3385	83	1711	39	4/10	43.87	88	–
80	Indika de Saram	1999–2000	4	5	0	117	39	23.40	–	–	–	–	–	–	1	–
81	Indika Gallage	1999	1	1	0	3	3	3.00	150	5	77	0	–	–	0	–
82	Dilhara Fernando	2000–2012	40	47	17	249	39*	8.30	6181	143	3784	100	5/42	37.84	10	–
83	Prasanna Jayawardene	2000–2015	58	83	11	2124	154*	29.50	–	–	–	–	–	–	124	32
84	Kumar Sangakkara	2000–2015	134	233	17	12400	319	57.40	84	0	49	0	–	–	182	20
85	Dinuka Hettiarachchi	2001	1	2	1	0	0*	0.00	162	7	41	2	2/36	20.50	0	–
86	Thilan Samaraweera	2001–2013	81	132	20	5462	231	48.76	1327	36	689	15	4/49	45.93	45	–
87	Michael Vandort	2001–2008	20	33	2	1144	140	36.90	–	–	–	–	–	–	6	–
88	Charitha Buddhika	2001–2002	9	8	3	132	45	26.40	1270	31	792	18	4/27	44.00	4	–
89	Sujeewa de Silva	2002–2007	3	2	1	10	5*	10.00	432	18	209	11	4/35	19.00	1	–
90	Chamila Gamage	2002	2	3	0	42	40	14.00	288	10	158	5	2/33	31.60	1	–
91	Jehan Mubarak	2002–2015	13	23	1	385	49	17.50	103	2	66	0	–	–	15	–
92	Naveed Nawaz	2002	1	2	1	99	78*	99.00	–	–	–	–	–	–	0	–
93	Hasantha Fernando	2002	2	4	0	38	24	9.50	234	7	108	4	3/63	27.00	1	–
94	Kaushal Lokuarachchi	2003–2004	4	5	1	94	28*	23.50	594	20	295	5	2/47	59.00	1	–
95	Prabath Nissanka	2003	4	5	2	18	12*	6.00	587	21	366	10	5/64	36.60	0	–
96	Thilan Thushara	2003–2010	10	14	3	94	15*	8.54	1668	35	1040	28	5/83	37.14	3	–
97	Dinusha Fernando	2003	2	3	1	56	51*	28.00	126	2	107	1	1/29	107.00	0	–
98	Farveez Maharoof	2004–2011	22	34	4	556	72	18.53	2940	107	1631	25	4/52	65.24	7	–
99	Lasith Malinga	2004–2010	30	37	13	275	64	11.45	5209	112	3349	101	5/50	33.15	7	–
100	Nuwan Kulasekara	2005–2014	21	28	1	391	64	14.48	3567	120	1794	48	4/21	37.37	8	–
101	Shantha Kalavitigoda	2005	1	2	0	8	7	4.00	–	–	–	–	–	–	2	–
102	Gayan Wijekoon	2005	2	3	0	38	14	12.67	114	4	66	2	2/49	33.00	0	–
103	Upul Tharanga	2005–2017	31	58	3	1754	165	31.89	–	–	–	–	–	–	24	–
104	Chamara Kapugedera	2006–2009	8	15	3	418	96	34.83	12	0	9	0	–	–	6	–
105	Chamara Silva	2006–2008	11	17	1	537	152*	33.56	102	2	65	1	1/57	65.00	7	–
106	Malinda Warnapura	2007–2009	14	24	1	821	120	35.69	54	0	40	0	–	–	14	–
107	Chanaka Welegedara	2007–2014	21	30	6	218	48	9.08	3799	114	2273	55	5/52	41.32	5	–
108	Ishara Amerasinghe	2008	1	2	2	0	0*	–	150	1	105	1	1/62	105.00	0	–
109	Ajantha Mendis	2008–2014	19	19	6	213	78	16.38	4730	118	2434	70	6/99	34.77	2	–
110	Dhammika Prasad	2008–2015	25	39	2	476	47	12.86	4327	96	2698	75	5/50	35.97	6	–
111	Tharanga Paranavitana	2009–2012	32	60	5	1792	111	32.58	102	0	86	1	1/26	86.00	27	–
112	Angelo Mathews	2009–2025	119	212	27	8214	200*	44.40	3978	161	1798	33	4/44	54.48	78	–
113	Suraj Randiv	2010–2012	12	17	1	147	39	9.18	3146	70	1613	43	5/82	37.51	1	–
114	Suranga Lakmal	2010–2022	70	109	25	934	42	11.11	12443	439	6232	171	5/54	36.44	22	–
115	Thisara Perera	2011–2012	6	10	0	203	75	20.30	954	20	653	11	4/63	59.36	1	–
116	Lahiru Thirimanne	2011–2022	44	85	6	2088	155*	26.43	84	1	51	0	–	–	36	–
117	Seekkuge Prasanna	2011	1	1	0	5	5	5.00	138	3	80	0	–	–	0	–
118	Shaminda Eranga	2011–2016	19	26	11	193	45*	12.86	3891	125	2138	57	4/49	37.50	5	–
119	Nuwan Pradeep	2011–2017	28	50	17	132	17*	4.00	5077	130	3003	70	6/132	42.90	5	–
120	Kaushal Silva	2011–2018	39	74	0	2099	139	28.36	–	–	–	–	–	–	34	1
121	Kosala Kulasekara	2011	1	2	0	22	15	11.00	168	7	80	1	1/65	80.00	0	–
122	Dinesh Chandimal	2011–2025	90	161	15	6361	206*	43.56	–	–	–	–	–	–	95	10
123	Dimuth Karunaratne	2012–2025	100	191	7	7222	244	39.25	312	5	202	2	1/12	101.00	62	–
124	Kithuruwan Vithanage	2013–2015	10	16	2	370	103*	26.42	174	1	133	1	1/73	133.00	10	–
125	Sachithra Senanayake	2013–2014	1	1	0	5	5	5.00	138	2	96	0	–	–	1	–
126	Dilruwan Perera	2014–2021	43	77	8	1303	95	18.88	10805	239	5780	161	6/32	35.90	19	–
127	Niroshan Dickwella	2014–2023	54	96	7	2757	96	30.97	–	–	–	–	–	–	134	27
128	Tharindu Kaushal	2014–2015	7	12	2	106	18	10.60	1658	22	1105	25	5/42	44.20	3	–
129	Dushmantha Chameera	2015–2021	12	20	2	101	22	5.61	1950	28	1295	32	5/47	40.46	4	–
130	Kusal Perera	2015–2021	22	41	3	1177	153*	30.97	–	–	–	–	–	–	19	8
131	Milinda Siriwardana	2015–2016	5	9	0	298	68	33.11	413	6	257	11	3/25	23.36	3	–
132	Kusal Mendis	2015–2025	73	135	6	4757	245	36.87	132	1	118	1	1/10	118.00	114	4
133	Udara Jayasundera	2015	2	4	0	30	26	7.50	42	0	45	0	–	–	2	–
134	Dasun Shanaka	2016–2021	6	12	2	140	66*	14.00	762	19	431	13	3/46	33.15	4	–
135	Dhananjaya de Silva	2016–2025	65	115	9	4133	173	38.99	4149	84	2301	43	3/25	53.51	87	–
136	Lakshan Sandakan	2016–2018	11	17	6	117	25	10.63	2063	37	1276	37	5/132	34.48	6	–
137	Vishwa Fernando	2016–2025	28	40	17	161	38	7.00	4422	102	2595	81	5/101	32.03	8	–
138	Asela Gunaratne	2016–2017	6	10	2	455	116	56.87	156	1	114	3	2/28	38.00	6	–
139	Lahiru Kumara	2016–2025	34	50	21	135	13*	4.65	5810	136	3749	104	6/122	36.04	11	–
140	Danushka Gunathilaka	2017–2018	8	6	0	299	61	18.68	198	3	111	1	1/16	111.00	6	–
141	Malinda Pushpakumara	2017–2018	4	8	2	102	42*	17.00	860	14	520	14	3/28	37.14	2	–
142 (Note: Sadeera Samarawickrama and Lahiru Gamage made their debut in the same match against the Pakistan in 2017. ESPNcricinfo lists their cap numbers alphabetically by surname, however their correct designated numbers are 142 (Samarawickrama) and 143 (Gamage).)	Sadeera Samarawickrama	2017–2024	9	14	1	308	104*	23.69	–	–	–	–	–	–	15	2
143	Lahiru Gamage	2017–2018	5	8	4	6	3	1.50	1112	39	573	10	2/38	57.30	0	–
144	Roshen Silva	2017–2019	12	23	3	702	109	35.10	–	–	–	–	–	–	2	–
145	Akila Dananjaya	2018	6	10	2	135	43*	16.87	1385	33	819	33	6/115	24.81	1	–
146	Kasun Rajitha	2018–2024	18	24	5	133	22	7.00	2996	102	1627	55	5/56	29.58	8	–
147	Mahela Udawatte	2018	2	4	0	23	19	5.75	–	–	–	–	–	–	2	–
148	Chamika Karunaratne	2019	1	2	0	22	22	11.00	156	1	148	1	1/130	148.00	1	–
149	Lasith Embuldeniya	2019–2022	17	27	1	191	40	7.34	4845	141	2611	71	7/137	36.77	2	–
150	Oshada Fernando	2019–2025	22	39	4	1104	102	31.54	18	0	19	0	–	–	14	–
151	Wanindu Hasaranga	2020–2021	4	7	0	196	59	28.00	674	8	403	4	4/171	100.75	2	–
152	Minod Bhanuka	2021–2021	1	2	0	6	5	3.00	–	–	–	–	–	–	0	–
153	Asitha Fernando	2021–2025	24	34	16	58	11	3.22	3721	82	2187	80	6/51	27.33	6	–
154	Ramesh Mendis	2021–2025	16	24	1	408	45*	17.73	4173	84	2212	71	6/70	31.15	6	–
155	Pathum Nissanka	2021–2025	18	31	2	1305	187	45.00	–	–	–	–	–	–	12	–
156	Praveen Jayawickrama	2021–2022	5	6	5	12	8*	12.00	1320	50	642	25	6/92	25.68	2	–
157	Charith Asalanka	2021–2022	3	6	0	88	29	14.66	25	0	16	0	–	–	1	–
158	Jeffrey Vandersay	2022–2025	2	4	0	71	53	17.75	288	0	250	5	3/182	50.00	1	–
159	Maheesh Theekshana	2022	2	3	0	59	38	19.66	365	10	188	5	2/28	37.60	1	–
160	Prabath Jayasuriya	2022–2025	22	34	2	255	28*	7.96	7163	184	3828	122	7/52	31.37	4	–
161	Kamindu Mendis	2022–2025	14	24	3	1316	182*	62.66	126	0	112	3	3/32	37.33	14	–
162	Dunith Wellalage	2022	1	2	0	29	18	14.50	78	1	35	0	–	–	2	–
163	Nishan Madushka	2023–2024	10	18	1	571	205	33.58	–	–	–	–	–	–	15	–
164	Dilshan Madushanka	2023	1	2	1	0	0*	0.00	102	3	77	0	–	–	1	–
165	Chamika Gunasekara	2024	1	1	1	16	16*		54	1	50	0	–	–	0	–
166	Milan Rathnayake	2024	5	6	0	190	72	31.66	689	16	393	14	3/39	28.07	3	–
167	Nishan Peiris	2024–2025	3	4	1	9	5	3.00	789	12	520	12	6/70	43.33	0	–
168	Lahiru Udara	2025	2	3	0	78	40	26.00	–	–	–	–	–	–	2	–
169	Tharindu Rathnayake	2025	2	2	0	10	10	5.00	604	5	389	9	3/102	43.22	0	–
170	Sonal Dinusha	2025	1	1	0	11	11	11.00	75	4	29	3	3/22	9.66	0	–
171	Isitha Wijesundara	2026	1	2	0	24	11	12.00	210	–	127	–	–	–	0	–
172	Keshara Nuwantha	2026	1	2	0	22	11	11.00	372	4	261	4	3/175	4/261	0	–
173	Pasindu Sooriyabandara	2026	1	1	0	0	0	0.00	–	–	–	–	–	–	0	–
174	Kamil Mishara	2026	1	–	–	–	–	–	–	–	–	–	–	–	0	–

== See also ==
- Test cricket
- Sri Lanka national cricket team
- List of Sri Lanka ODI cricketers
- List of Sri Lanka Twenty20 International cricketers
