= Susil Fernando =

Sri Lankan Australian cricketer (born 1955)

Personal information
- Full name: Ellekutige Rufus Nemesion Susil Fernando
- Born: 19 December 1955 (age 70)
- Batting: Right-handed

International information
- National side: Sri Lanka
- Test debut (cap 17): 4 March 1983 v New Zealand
- Last Test: 16 March 1984 v New Zealand
- ODI debut (cap 30): 2 March 1983 v New Zealand
- Last ODI: 30 April 1983 v Australia

Career statistics
Competition	Test	ODI	FC	LA
Matches	5	7	21	9
Runs scored	112	101	963	111
Batting average	11.19	20.19	30.09	15.85
100s/50s	0/0	0/0	2/5	0/0
Top score	46	36	110	36
Catches/stumpings	0/–	0/–	8/–	1/–
- Source: Cricinfo, 19 February 2019

Ellekutige Rufus Nemesion Susil Fernando (born 19 December 1955) is a Sri Lankan Australian former cricketer who played in five Test matches and seven One Day Internationals from 1983 to 1984.

Following the end of his cricketing career, Fernando migrated to Australia.
