= Mahes Goonatilleke =

Sri Lankan cricketer (born 1952)

Personal information
- Full name: Hettiarachige Mahes Goonatilleke
- Born: 16 August 1952 (age 74); Kegalle, Sri Lanka
- Batting: Right-handed

International information
- National side: Sri Lanka (1975–1982)
- Test debut (cap 5): 17 February 1982 v England
- Last Test: 17 September 1982 v India
- ODI debut (cap 23): 14 June 1975 v Pakistan
- Last ODI: 26 September 1982 v India

Career statistics
Competition	Test	ODI
Matches	5	6
Runs scored	177	31
Batting average	22.12	31.00
100s/50s	0/1	0/0
Top score	56	14*
Catches/stumpings	10/3	0/4
- Source: Cricinfo, 16 August 2005

Hettiarachige Mahes Goonatilleke (born 16 August 1952) is a former Sri Lankan cricketer, who played five Test matches and six One Day Internationals as wicket-keeper during 1981 and 1982 – being Sri Lanka's first wicketkeeper in Test cricket.

== International career ==
He is regarded by many as the finest wicket-keeper produced by the island nation and even made 56 against Pakistan as an opener in Faisalabad. Goonatilleke had a chance to become a regular wicket-keeper for Sri Lanka, but he chose to tour South Africa in the 1982/83 season, and that disqualified him from playing international cricket.
