= Prabath Nissanka =

Sri Lankan cricketer (born 1980)

Personal information
- Full name: Ratnayake Arachchige Prabath Nissanka
- Born: 25 October 1980 (age 46); Ambalantota, Sri Lanka
- Batting: Right-handed
- Bowling: Right-arm medium-fast
- Role: Bowler

International information
- National side: Sri Lanka (2001-2003)
- Test debut (cap 95): 25 April 2003 v New Zealand
- Last Test: 27 June 2003 v West Indies
- ODI debut (cap 109): 27 October 2001 v Pakistan
- Last ODI: 8 June 2003 v West Indies

Career statistics
Competition	Test	ODI
Matches	4	23
Runs scored	18	53
Batting average	6.00	6.62
100s/50s	0/0	0/0
Top score	12*	11
Balls bowled	587	997
Wickets	10	27
Bowling average	36.60	31.74
5 wickets in innings	1	0
10 wickets in match	0	0
Best bowling	5/64	4/12
Catches/stumpings	0/–	3/–
- Source: Cricinfo, 9 February 2017

Jayawardane Ratnayake Arachchige Prabath Nissanka (born October 25, 1980), or Prabath Nissanka, is a former Sri Lankan cricketer, who played in Test matches and One Day Internationals for the Sri Lanka national cricket team. He is a right-handed batsman and a right-arm medium-fast bowler.

He hailed from St. Thomas' College, Matara and one of the quickest bowlers produced by Sri Lanka.

== Domestic career ==
He had an impressive debut in Sharjah in October 2001, picking up two wickets in the process. Nissanka also played List A cricket between 1998 and 2003. He is a member of the MRF Foundation for pace bowlers.

== International career ==
Nissanka was a part of Sri Lanka's ICC Cricket World Cup squad in 2003 and his 4/12 helped Sri Lanka to restrict Canada to 36 runs which is a World Cup record.

In Nissanka's last match, he took 5/64 against West Indies. Nissanka is prone to suffering from various ailments on his knees and had to undergo surgery after his last match. Doctors have said that the probability of him playing competitive cricket ever in his life again is minimum.

== After cricket ==
After playing competitive cricket, he was the strength and conditioning coach for the under-19 Sri Lankan National Team. He qualified as a level 3 high performance coach and became the assistant national bowling coach for Sri Lanka Cricket. He resigned from Sri Lanka Cricket in 2013 and moved to Australia to complete Level 3 and 4 in fitness. He is currently working as a cricket coach and a personal fitness trainer.
