= Sridharan Jeganathan =

Sri Lankan cricketer (1951–1996)

Personal information
- Born: 11 July 1951; Colombo, Sri Lanka
- Died: 14 May 1996 (aged 44)
- Batting: Right-handed
- Bowling: Slow left-arm orthodox
- Role: All-rounder

International information
- National side: Sri Lanka (1983–1988)
- Test debut (cap 19): 4 March 1983 v New Zealand
- Last Test: 11 March 1983 v New Zealand
- ODI debut (cap 33): 20 March 1983 v New Zealand
- Last ODI: 14 January 1988 v Australia

Domestic team information
- Years: Team
- 1980–1990: Nondescripts Cricket Club

Career statistics
Competition	Test	ODI	FC	LA
Matches	2	5	29	13
Runs scored	19	25	437	109
Batting average	4.75	8.33	13.65	13.62
100s/50s	0/0	0/0	0/1	0/0
Top score	8	20*	75	36
Balls bowled	30	276	3,736	630
Wickets	0	5	49	9
Bowling average	–	41.60	31.61	51.66
5 wickets in innings	0	0	1	0
10 wickets in match	0	–	0	–
Best bowling	–	2/45	5/34	2/45
Catches/stumpings	0/–	1/–	14/–	1/–
- Source: Cricinfo, 3 October 2011

Sridharan Jeganathan (11 July 1951 – 14 May 1996) was a Sri Lankan cricketer who played in two Test matches and five One Day Internationals from 1983 to 1988.

Jeganathan made his highest first-class score of 74 against Tasmania on Sri Lanka's brief tour of Australia in 1982–83. He later became Malaysia's national coach. He was the first Sri Lankan Test cricketer to die.
