= Athula Samarasekera =

Sri Lankan cricketer and coach

Personal information
- Full name: Maitipage Athula Rohitha Samarasekera
- Born: 5 August 1961 (age 65); Galle
- Nickname: Big Sam
- Height: 6 ft 3 in (1.91 m)
- Batting: Right-handed
- Bowling: Right-arm medium

International information
- National side: Sri Lanka (1983–1994)
- Test debut (cap 42): 25 August 1988 v England
- Last Test: 12 December 1991 v Pakistan
- ODI debut (cap 36): 9 June 1983 v Pakistan
- Last ODI: 18 April 1994 v New Zealand

Domestic team information
- Years: Team
- 1983–1994: Colombo Cricket Club

Career statistics
Competition	Test	ODI	FC
Matches	4	39	57
Runs scored	118	844	2,737
Batting average	16.85	22.81	33.79
100s/50s	0/1	0/4	6/13
Top score	57	76	191
Balls bowled	192	338	3,774
Wickets	3	0	46
Bowling average	34.46	–	39.58
5 wickets in innings	0	–	0
10 wickets in match	0	–	0
Best bowling	2/38	–	3/31
Catches/stumpings	3/–	5/–	36/–
- Source: Cricinfo, 5 June 2010

Maitipage Athula Rohitha Samarasekera (born 5 August 1961) is a Sri Lankan Australian cricket coach and former cricketer. He was a hard hitting opening batsman and a medium fast bowler, who played four Tests and 39 One Day Internationals between 1983 and 1994.

Samarasekera was a member of the Sri Lankan cricket teams participated for the Cricket World Cup in 1983 and 1992.

== Early years ==
Athula Samarasekera started his cricket career at Mahinda College, Galle, where he had his education. He captained his college cricket team at the annual Richmond–Mahinda Cricket Encounter in 1981. Then he joined the Colombo Cricket Club, where he subsequently became a permanent fixture of the team.

== International career ==
Samarasekera made his One Day International debut at Swansea against Pakistan during the 1983 Cricket World Cup and made his Test debut 5 years later against England at the Lord's in August 1988. He scored a half century in the second innings of his first test and took three wickets in the match, though Sri Lanka went on to lose the game by 7 wickets.

Samarasekera was one of the first openers to successfully take the advantage of field restrictions by hitting air-borne shots in ODI cricket. His most memorable ODI performance came in the 1992 cricket world cup, when he scored a brisk 75 against Zimbabwe, reaching his half century in just 31 balls in the first ever successful run chase of over 300 runs in ODI history.

Tall and correct, he was an aggressive batsman and more than a handy bowler, but failed to make his mark in international cricket with the limited opportunities he got. His elder brother Anura Samarasekera was also a first class cricketer in Sri Lanka.

== After cricket ==
Samarasekera chose to end his international career in 1994 by deciding to take up professional cricket in Bangladesh, since he never had the opportunity to fully establish a permanent position in the team.

Athula now lives in Hampton Park, a suburb of Melbourne, with his wife and children. He coaches young cricketers in the arts of batting and bowling.
