= Darrell Lieversz =

Sri Lankan cricketer (born 1943)

Personal information
- Full name: Darrell Walter Lloyd Lieversz
- Born: 7 June 1943 (age 83); Colombo, Ceylon
- Batting: Right-handed
- Bowling: Right-arm medium-pace

Career statistics
Competition	First-class
Matches	8
Runs scored	109
Batting average	12.11
100s/50s	0/0
Top score	40*
Balls bowled	1392
Wickets	32
Bowling average	18.65
5 wickets in innings	3
10 wickets in match	0
Best bowling	6/29
Catches/stumpings	3/0
- Source: CricketArchive, 29 September 2016

Darrell Walter Lloyd Lieversz (born 7 June 1943) is a former cricketer who played for Ceylon in 1964 and 1965.

== Life and career ==
Lieversz attended Royal College, Colombo, where he opened the bowling and captained the cricket team in 1962. In February 1962, against St Peter's College, Colombo, he took 13 wickets for 24. Later that year he toured India with the Ceylon Schools team. After he left school he joined Colts Cricket Club, and in his first season of top-level club cricket he took 72 wickets at an average of 9.78, setting a tournament record for the number of wickets in a season.

He was also a talented runner, and represented Ceylon in the 100, 200 and 400 metres in the 4th Asian Games in Jakarta in 1962.

Lieversz made his first-class debut in the Gopalan Trophy match in 1963–64. He and Norton Fredrick, who was also making his first-class debut, opened the bowling together and took 13 wickets between them. Lieversz took 6 for 29 in the second innings, dismissing Madras for 150 and leaving the Ceylon team with an easy target for victory. He was Ceylon's leading bowler, taking 5 for 40 and 4 for 28, all of top-order batsmen, when Ceylon beat a strong Pakistan A team in Colombo in August 1964.

Lieversz toured India with the Ceylon team in 1964-65, playing in the victory over India in Ahmedabad.

He played no further first-class cricket after that tour. He went to work for the Duckwari Estate tea plantation in Rangala in Central Province and was unable to get sufficient practice to keep in top form. He and his wife and their three daughters moved to Australia in 1986, where he worked for Coca-Cola. He is now retired.

His father, Douglas Lieversz, played for Ceylon in the 1930s.

In September 2018, Lieversz was one of 49 former Sri Lankan cricketers felicitated by Sri Lanka Cricket, to honour them for their services before Sri Lanka became a full member of the International Cricket Council (ICC).
