= Ceylonese cricket team in Pakistan in 1966–67 =

International cricket tour

The Ceylon cricket team toured Pakistan in November 1966. Ceylon did not then have Test status, but three five-day unofficial Tests were played, Pakistan winning all three by large margins in only four days. The tour also included two other first-class matches before the unofficial Tests.

== The Ceylon team ==
- Michael Tissera (captain)
- Neil Chanmugam
- Fitzroy Crozier
- Herbert Fernando
- Lionel Fernando
- Norton Fredrick
- David Heyn
- Clive Inman
- Stanley Jayasinghe
- Nihal Kodituwakku
- Ian Pieris
- Anura Tennekoon
- B. W. R. Thomas
- Sarath Wimalaratne

All 14 players appeared in the three-match series against Pakistan. Pakistan, captained by Hanif Mohammad, also used 14 players. Only five of the Ceylon team – Tissera, Chanmugam, Herbert Fernando, Fredrick and Jayasinghe – had toured India in 1964–65, Ceylon's previous major tour.

== The tour ==
After a drawn two-day match in Bahawalpur, the Ceylon team drew a first-class match against a President's XI in Rawalpindi. Inman was the highest scorer, with 87 in 90 minutes in the first innings, and Wimalaratne and Thomas were the chief wicket-takers. Next came a first-class match in Lyallpur against a Punjab Governor's XI, which was also drawn. Inman scored 102 in 127 minutes in the first innings, and Chanmugam and Thomas were the chief wicket-takers.

In the first unofficial Test, at Lahore Stadium, Pakistan scored 425 (Mushtaq Mohammad 101), Crozier taking 6 for 135 and Chanmugam 3 for 54. Ceylon were then dismissed for 189 (Intikhab Alam 5 for 70; Wimalaratne, at number 11, was the highest scorer with 41 not out) and, following on, 275 (Jayasinghe 118; Intikhab Alam 4 for 85). Pakistan scored 40 without loss to win by 10 wickets.

The second match, at Dacca Stadium, was even more one-sided, Pakistan declaring and winning by an innings and 37 runs. Pakistan scored 517 for 7 declared (Mushtaq Mohammad 129, Hanif Mohammad 114; Thomas took the first three wickets and finished with 3 for 166). Ceylon made 213 and 267. Crozier's 57 in the second innings was the only fifty; Saeed Ahmed took 5 for 48 and 5 for 82.

The third match, at the National Stadium, Karachi, was another innings victory for Pakistan. Ceylon were dismissed for 178 (Saleem Altaf 4 for 56), Pakistan replied with 483 (Javed Burki 210; Crozier 7 for 133) and Ceylon made 270 in their second innings (Tissera 120 not out; Intikhab Alam 4 for 55), giving Pakistan victory by an innings and 35 runs.

In the series, Pakistan scored 1466 runs for 27 wickets at an average of 54.29; Ceylon scored 1392 for 60 wickets, average 23.20.

The tour, which had been intended to prepare the Ceylon players for the planned tour of England in 1968, was a disappointment. Wisden's report put Ceylon's failure down to their inexperience in longer matches: "Ceylon, whose cricket is normally confined to one and a half day games, showed their inability in four-day cricket, always forcing the pace, trying to make the game bright and entertaining, and as a result they lacked the staying power and temperament which are so vital in big cricket." Some of the Ceylon players thought the Pakistan umpires were biased against them.

== Leading players ==
In the three matches against Pakistan, Crozier was Ceylon's outstanding player, taking 14 wickets (out of the 27 wickets Pakistan lost in total) at an average of 26.57, and making 142 runs at an average of 23.66. Jayasinghe and Tissera each scored a century, but otherwise failed to reach 30; Ceylon's only other fifty was Crozier's in the second match. Inman, after good form in the preliminary matches, scored only 110 runs at an average of 18.33.
