= Battle of the Saints (Colombo) =

Annual Cricket Match in Sri Lanka

- Sport: Cricket
- Teams: St. Joseph's College, Colombo; St. Peter's College, Colombo
- First meeting: 1933
- Latest meeting: 2024
- Next meeting: 2025
- Stadiums: Singhalese Sports Club Cricket Ground
- Trophy: Reverend Father Maurice Legoc Trophy

Statistics
- Most wins: St. Joseph's College - 12

The Battle of the Saints is the annual cricket contest between St. Joseph's College and St Peter's College in Colombo, Sri Lanka, which typically takes place in March. Inaugurated in 1933 by the Rectors of both schools and has since become a highly anticipated event, attracting significant media coverage and enthusiastic supporters. Since 2016, which is the 82nd encounter, both teams compete for the Reverend Father Maurice Legoc Trophy, named after the tournament's founder.
For the past 82 matches, St. Joseph's college have recorded 12 wins, while the Peterites have registered 10. The rest of the matches have ended up as a draw with no wins for either team. In 2008 St. Joseph's college won the match, which ended a 35-year drought, and in 2010 St. Peter's won the match after 32 years.
In the series the highest score is recorded by St Joseph's college, which is 382, made back in 1982, led by Ken Serpanchy, while St. Peter's college best being 345 for 9 in 1938 under Percy Perera.

The lowest score was recorded by St. Peter's College in 1972 when they were bowled out for just 36. St Joseph's College recorded their lowest score of 56 in 1938.

In the limited overs encounter Joes have bowled the Peterites thrice for less than 100 and the Peterites are yet to bowl the Josephians out for less than 100.

In the 42nd Annual 50 overs encounter Peterite batsman Hashan Wanasekera played a match-winning knock of 118 runs that set a record stand of 152 runs for any wicket for the Bambalapitiya school erasing the previous best partnership of 143 runs between Angelo Perera and Chathura Peiris in 2009. His partner was Lakshina Rodrigo who made 61.

The lowest total in the shorter format is also recorded by St. Peter's when they were bowled out for 58 runs in 2003 in response to St. Joseph's College score of 217, which incidentally is the highest winning margin.

In the longer version, Clive Inman of St. Peter's College holds the highest individual score which is 204 in 1954. Shenal Warnakula of St. Joseph's College holds the record as the most successful bowler in terms of wickets -taking 9 wickets for 41 in 1997.

== Notable persons who have played ==
† Denotes player represented the National Team at Test Level
‡ Denotes player captained the national team (Test, ODI and/or T20I) and represented the National Team at Test Level
^ Denotes notable player that hasn't played international matches

Josephians

- Ashley de Silva†
- Ajith Weerakkody
- Roshan Abeysinghe^
- Chaminda Vaas‡
- Michael Vandort†
- Angelo Mathews‡
- Thisara Perera†
- Dimuth Karunaratne‡
- Roshen Silva†
- Sadeera Samarawickrama†
- Priyamal Perera
- Dunith Wellalage
- Shevon Daniel

Peterites

- H I K Fernando^
- Roy Dias†
- David Heyn
- Clive Inman^
- Vinodhan John†
- Tony Opatha
- Rumesh Ratnayake†
- Amal Silva†
- Russell Arnold†
- Kaushal Lokuarachchi†
- Malinda Warnapura†
- Angelo Perera
- Andri Berenger
- Janith Liyanage
- Dushan Hemantha
- Wanuja Sahan

== Match history ==
| Year | Encounter | Venue | Captains | | 1st INNINGS | | 2nd INNINGS | | Result |
| Year | Encounter | Venue | SJC | SPC | SJC | SPC | SJC | SPC | Result |
|---|---|---|---|---|---|---|---|---|---|
| 1933 | 1st | SPC | Robert Fernando | George Jayaweera | 225 | 50 | | 70 | SJC |
| 1934 | 2nd | SJC | Claude Wijesinghe | Sherley de s Illesinghe | 380 | 139 | | 39 | SJC |
| 1935 | 3rd | SPC | Claude Wijesinghe | Sherley de s Illesinghe | 185 | 240 | 127/7 | | Draw |
| 1936 | 4th | SJC | Malcolm Spittel | Tybalt Herath | 289 | 222 | 63/3 dec. | 51/3 | Draw |
| 1937 | 5th | SPC | Fred Perera | J Ray de Silva | 253 | 183 | | 236/8 | Draw |
| 1938 | 6th | SJC | Edward Markus | Percy Perera | 56 | 345/9 dec. | 227/4 | | Draw |
| 1939 | 7th | SPC | Hector Perera Snr. | Joe Misso | 129 | 312 | 159/5 | | Draw |
| 1940 | 8th | SPC | Czerny Serpanchy | Archibald Weerasinghe | 167 | 83 | 184 | 160 | SJC |
| 1941 | 9th | SPC | Hugh Muller | Archibald Weerasinghe | 168 | 148 | 138 | 62/2 | Draw |
| 1942 | | | Fairlie Dalpathado | Eric Schokman | Not Played Due to War | | | | |
| 1943 | | | Fairlie Dalpathado | No Team | Not Played Due to War | | | | |
| 1944 | 10th | Varsity | Malcolm de Costa | Anton Perera | 288 | 115 | | 118 | SJC |
| 1945 | 11th | SSC | Malcolm de Costa | Anton Perera | 240 | 165 | 176/6 dec. | 102 | SJC |
| 1946 | 12th | SSC | Neil Weerasinghe | Dion Walles | 109 | 256 | 212 | 56/3 | SPC |
| 1947 | 13th | SSC | Neil Weerasinghe | Dion Walles | 141 | 317 | 157 | | SPC |
| 1948 | 14th | SSC | Joe de Mel | Michael Chanmugam | 180 | 134 | 88 | 127 | SJC |
| 1949 | 15th | SSC | Tommy Rodrigo | Darrel Weinman | 112 | 91 | 161/6 | 179 | SJC |
| 1950 | 16th | SSC | Billy Balthazar | M S M Ghouse | 110 | 167 | 194/7 | 165 | Draw |
| 1951 | 17th | SSC | Joe Perera | Herbert I K Fernando | 359 | 170 | | 174/5 | Draw |
| 1952 | 18th | NCC | Ken Surpanchy | Herbert I K Fernando | 382 | 96 | | 70 | SJC |
| 1953 | 19th | Oval | Rienzy Perera | Harold Wittachchy | 180 | 158 | 2/0 | 172 | Draw |
| 1954 | 20th | Oval | Chrisantha Fernando | Clive Inman | 152 | 308 | | 175/5 | Draw |
| 1955 | 21st | Oval | Mahinda de Silva | Clive Inman | 117 | 224 | 150 | 46/2 | SPC |
| 1956 | 22nd | Oval | Keerthi Caldera | Ken Dackworth | 123 | 163/5 dec. | 91/5 | 47/8 dec. | SJC |
| 1957 | 23rd | Oval | Keerthi Caldera | Jayantha Fernando | 298 | 192 | | 246 | Draw |
| 1958 | 24th | Oval | Carlyle Perera | Russell Duckworth | 246/9 dec. | 314/5 dec. | 40/1 | 90/5 | Draw |
| 1959 | 25th | Oval | Claude Perera | Brian Seneviratne | 157 | 161 | 111/7 dec. | 41/4 | Draw |
| 1960 | 26th | Oval | Priya Perera | Premesiri Athukorala | 227/9 dec. | 249/7 dec. | 161/3 dec. | 30/2 | Draw |
| 1961 | 27th | SPC | Raja de Silva | Adiel Anghie | 109 | 230/9 dec. | 140/8 | | Draw |
| 1962 | 28th | NCC | Hilary Mercilline | Richard Heyn | 82 | 55 | 139/9 | 168/9 dec. | Draw |
| 1963 | 29th | SPC | Brian Perumal | Tyronne Le Mercier | 106 | 161 | 118/7 | 152/4 dec. | Draw |
| 1964 | 30th | Oval | Berchman de Alwis | David Heyn | 108 | 83 | 90/6 | 146/9 dec. | Draw |
| 1965 | 31st | SPC | Christopher Moreira | Travice Fernando | 130 | 201 | 164 | 94/4 | SPC |
| 1966 | 32nd | Oval | Allan de Costa | Darrel Wimalarathne | 195/8 dec. | 215 | 68/6 | 125/4 dec. | Draw |
| 1967*** | 33rd | Oval | Anil Peiris | Tony Opatha | 142 | 81 | 102 | 163/8 | SPC |
| 1968 | 34th | Oval | Lalith de S Wijayarathne | Rodney Patternott | 100/4 | 119/9 dec. | | | Draw |
| 1969 | 35th | Oval | Brian Obeyesekere | Denham Juriansz | 201 | 187/7 dec. | 146/5 dec. | 104/5 | Draw |
| 1970 | 36th | Oval | Hector Perera Jnr. | Rory Inman | 252/7 dec. | 105 | 18/0 | 164 | SJC |
| 1971 | 37th | Oval | Manik de s Wijeyaratne*; Wendell Kelaart** | Roy Dias | 223 | 121 | 88/6 | 235/8 dec. | Draw |
| 1972 | 38th | Oval | Rohan Fernando | Roy Dias | 235/7 dec. | 112 | | 36 | SJC |
| 1973 | 39th | Oval | Gary Melder | Gamini Goonasena | 100 | 200/6 dec. | 161 | 63/4 | SPC |
| 1974 | 40th | Oval | Gary Melder | Ruwan Jayaweera | 271/7 | 169 | 23/1 | 151 | Draw |
| 1975 | 41st | Oval | Dushan Soza | Bernard Wijetunga Jnr. | 228/8 dec. | 128 | | 205/7 | Draw |
| 1976 | 42nd | Oval | Dushan Soza | Ranjan Perera | 108 | 151 | 164/8 dec. | 122/7 | Draw |
| 1977 | 43rd | Oval | Trevor Croner | Charinde Perera | 198/7 dec. | 179/6 dec. | 110/8 | | Draw |
| 1978 | 44th | Oval | Shamilal de S Wijeyaratne | Suraj Abeysekara | 217/9 dec. | 161 | 127/6 dec. | 187/4 | SPC |
| 1979 | 45th | Oval | Lakshman Aloysius | Kitto Fernandopulle | 288/6 dec. | 207/8 dec. | | 209/2 | Draw |
| 1980 | 46th | Oval | Rohan Wijesinghe Jnr. | Rohan Buultjens | 213/5 dec. | 267/6 dec. | 133/4 | 156/6 dec. | Draw |
| 1981 | 47th | Oval | Nirmala Perera | Michael Elias | 297/5 dec. | 160 | | 138/6 dec. | Draw |
| 1982 | 48th | Oval | Ashley de Silva | Niranjan Rodrigo | 181/6 dec. | 153/9 dec. | 53/2 | 180/7 dec. | Draw |
| 1983 | 49th | Oval | Hiran Cabraal | Shane Brohier*; Rumesh Ratnayake** | 113 | 203/6 dec. | 185/5 | 112/6 dec. | Draw |
| 1984 | 50th | Oval | Jeevaka Chandappa | Senerath Seneviratne | 1063 dec. | 185/8 dec. | 13/0 | 67/7 dec. | Draw |
| 1985 | 51st | Oval | Jonathan Alles | Heshan de Silva | 179/6 dec. | 199/7 dec. | | 129/6 dec. | Draw |
| 1986 | 52nd | Oval | Rohitha Tillakeratne | Ranmore Martinesz | 190/7 dec. | 133/6 dec. | 153/5 dec. | 181/7 | Draw |
| 1987 | 53rd | Khettarama | Rohan Weerakkody | Dilhan Perera | 190/4 dec. | 148/8 dec. | | 141 | Draw |
| 1988 | 54th | Khettarama | Asoka Jayamanne | Dilhan Perera | 261/6 dec. | 179/7 dec. | 107/8 dec. | 44/5 | Draw |
| 1989 | 55th | Khettarama | Prasann Leanage | Roshan Anthony | 211/7 dec. | 188/5 dec. | 159/9 dec. | 47/3 | Draw |
| 1990 | 56th | Khettarama | Oril de Mel | Indunil Anthony | 154 | 158/7 dec. | 90 | 64/6 | Draw |
| 1991 | 57th | Khettarama | Viran Perera | Hemal Wimalasekera | 227/8 dec. | 143/8 dec. | 79/9 dec. | 95/4 | Draw |
| 1992 | 58th | Khettarama | Sudantha Fernando | Asanga Perera | 136/7 dec. | 159/6 dec. | 98/4 | 137/7 dec. | Draw |
| 1993 | 59th | Khettarama | Praveen Fernando | Russell Arnold | 220/4 dec. | 147/5 dec. | 105/4 dec. | 127/5 | Draw |
| 1994 | 60th | Khettarama | Peter Hamer | Faizal Mohammed | 157/6 dec. | 181/6 dec. | 92/4 | 159/4 dec. | Draw |
| 1995 | 61st | Oval | Asela Pathirana | Damien Perera | 172 | 104/9 dec. | 139/4 dec. | 87/2 | Draw |
| 1996 | 62nd | Oval | Shalinka de Silva | Manura Neomal | 168/9 dec. | 182/7 dec. | 78/5 | 131/9 dec. | Draw |
| 1997 | 63rd | Oval | Trevin Mathews | Ramendra Nonis | 198 | 199 | 106/8 | 122 | Draw |
| 1998 | 64th | Oval | Monto Perera | Malinda Warnapura | 303/8 dec. | 273/6 dec. | 151/6 dec. | 62/4 | Draw |
| 1999 | 65th | Oval | Roshan de Silva | Dilshan Rupasinghe*; Jerome Fernando** | 252/5 dec. | 130 | 25/1 | 228/9 dec. | Draw |
| 2000**** | 66th | Oval | Ian Daniels | Chrisantha Peiris | 128/4 | 248 | | | Draw |
| 2001 | 67th | Oval | Anuk de S Wijeyaratne*; Danuk Pathirana** | Malin Silva*; Mahesh Perera | 235/8 dec. | 287/5 dec. | 2038 dec. | 80/1 | Draw |
| 2002 | 68th | Oval | Tivanka de S Wijeyaratne | Jehan Jayasuriya | 139 | 200 | 221/9 | 162 | Draw |
| 2003 | 69th | Oval | Deshan Bastianpillai | Nadhula de S Wijeyaratne | 178 | 255/7 dec. | 162/4 | 176/4 dec. | Draw |
| 2004 | 70th | Oval | Ranesh Perera | Dinesh Panditharantne*; Gihan de Silva** | 224/8 | 199 | 158/7 | 200 | Draw |
| 2005 | 71st | Oval | Hashan Gunatilleke | Prajeev Jansz | 126 | 220 | 303/7 dec. | 129/1 | Draw |
| 2006 | 72nd | Oval | Angelo Mathews | Hans Fernando | 218 | 201/6 dec. | 147 | 86/6 | Draw |
| 2007 | 73rd | Oval | Rajeewa Weerasinghe | Lahiru Peiris | 335/5 dec. | 193 | | 279/3 | Draw |
| 2008 | 74th | Oval | Ruwantha Fernandopulle | Anuk Silva | 255 | 137 | | 76 | SJC |
| 2009 | 75th | Oval | S.M Weerasinghe | Angelo Perera | 188/5 (49 overs) | 235 (55.5 overs) | 113/5 (32.4 overs) | 215/9 (55.4 overs) | Draw |
| 2010 | 76th | Oval | Dinal Dhambarage | Chathura Peiris | 158 (50.1 overs) | 293 (56.3 overs) | 164 (48.5 overs) | 33/0 (8.5 overs) | SPC |
| 2011 | 77th | Oval | Rosco Thatil | Denham Perera | 293 (56.3 overs) | 189 (45 overs) | | 260/1 (54.1 overs) | Draw |
| 2012 | 78th | Oval | Vidusha Jayasinghe | Shehan Fernando | 141 (42.2 overs) | 192 (52.4 overs) | 165 (62.4 overs) | 117/4 (24.2 overs) | SPC |
| 2013 | 79th | Oval | Sachien Hewawasam | Dushan Hemantha | 281/8 dec. (60 overs) | 238/9 dec. (60 overs) | 140/5 (24 overs) | 253/7 dec. | Draw |
| 2014 | 80th | Oval | Dylan Fernandopulle | Kavinda De Tissera | 251/8 dec. (53 overs) | 282 (59.5 overs) | | 181/9 dec. (68.2 overs) | Draw |
| 2015 | 81st | Oval | Pathum Madusanka | Chandula Jayamanna | 167 (59.5 overs) | 268 (56.4 overs) | 293/8 dec. (81.2 overs) | 110/7 (26 overs) | Draw |
| 2016 | 82nd | Oval | Sandaruwan Rodrigo | Vinu Mohotty | 106 (32.3 overs) | 304/9 dec. (60 overs) | 263 (107.5 overs) | 59/4 (9.2 overs/ Target 66 in 12 overs) | SPC |
| 2017 | 83rd | Oval | Harin Cooray | Lakshina Rodrigo | 205 (57.2 overs) | 188/8 dec.(60 overs) | 163/8 dec.(77 overs) | 99/0 (15 overs) | Draw |
| 2018 | 84th | Oval | Jehan Daniel | Santhush Gunathilake | 195 (53.2 overs) | 244 (60 overs) | 237/8 dec.(83 overs) | 57/1 (9.2 overs) | Draw |
| 2019 | 85th | Oval | Ashen Daniel | Ranmith Jayasena | 286/8 dec. (60 overs) | 219 (60 overs) | | 317/6 dec. (79 overs) | Draw |
| 2020 | 86th | Oval | Johanne De Zilva | Shannon Fernando | 259 (51.3 overs) | 224 (60 overs) | | 288/8 dec. (87.4 overs) | Draw |
| 2021 | 87th | SSC | Sheran Fonseka | Nipunaka Fonseka | 261/7 dec. (60 overs) | 138 (56.3 overs) | | 82/2 (22 overs) | Draw |
| 2022 | 88th | Oval | Shevon Daniel | Wanuja Sahan | 163 (45.1 overs) | 251/8 dec. (60 overs) | 163/5 (58 overs) | 232/7 dec. (59.5 overs) | Draw |
| 2023 | 89th | SSC | Sadeesh Jayawardana | Nimuthu Gunawardana | 240/2 (54.5 overs) | 214 (57.3 overs) | | | Draw |
| 2024 | 90th | SSC | Lahiru Amarasekara | Vishen Halambage | 228/5 dec. (49 overs) | 270/9 dec. (60 overs) | 75/1 (13 overs) | 204/9 dec. (63 overs) | Draw |
| 2025 | 91st | SSC | Kenath Liyanage | Oween Salgado | 240/7 dec. (72.3 overs) | 243 (93.3 overs) | 70/2 (13 overs) | 168 (54.4 overs) | Draw (First Ever 3 Day encounter.) |
| 2026 | 92nd | SSC | Rishma Amarasinghe | Enosh Peterson | 352/8 dec. (109.4 overs) | 257/9 (68.5 overs) | 190/4 dec. (34 overs) | 215/8 (50 overs) | Draw |
| 1933–2026 | | | | | | | | | SJC 12 - SPC 10 (70 Draws) |

== Limited Over history ==
| Year | Encounter | Venue | Captains | | Scores | | Result |
| Year | Encounter | Venue | SJC | SPC | SJC | SPC | Result |
|---|---|---|---|---|---|---|---|
| 1975 | 1st | SJC | Dushan Soza | Bernard Wijetunga | 118 (40.3 overs) | 120/5 (42.5 overs) | SPC |
| 1976 | 2nd | SPC | Dushan Soza | Ranjan Perera | 151 (47.2 overs) | 126 (50 overs) | SJC |
| 1977 | 3rd | SJC | Trevor Croner | Charinde Perera | 193/8 (50 overs) | 120 (41.3 overs) | SJC |
| 1978 | 4th | Oval | Shamilal de S Wijeyaratne | Suraj Abeysekara | 149 (43.2 overs) | 150/8 (45.5 overs) | SPC |
| 1979 | 5th | Oval | Lakshman Aloysius | Kitto Fernandopulle | 192/9 (50 overs) | 158 (44 overs) | SJC |
| 1980 | 6th | Oval | Rohan Wijesinghe | Rohan Buultjens | 198 (48.3 overs) | 71/6 (21 overs) | SJC |
| 1981 | 7th | Oval | Nirmalal Perera | Michael Elias | 125 (39.5 overs) | 158 (48.2 overs) | SPC |
| 1982 | 8th | Oval | Ashley de Silva | Niranjan Rodrigo | 216/8 (50 overs) | 130 (36.5 overs) | SJC |
| 1983 | 9th | Oval | Hiran Cabraal | Shane Brohier | 203/8 (50 overs) | 125 (35.3 overs) | SJC |
| 1984 | 10th | Oval | Jeevaka Chandappa | Senerath Seneviratne | 147/6 (41.5 overs) | 146 (41.4 overs) | SJC |
| 1985 | 11th | Oval | Johathan Alles | Heshan de Silva | 84/8 (41 overs) | 83 (32 overs) | SJC |
| 1986 | 12th | CCC | Rohitha Thilakaratne | Ranmore Martinesz | 161 (47.5 overs) | 163/5 (43.3 overs) | SPC |
| 1987 | 13th | Khettarama | Rohan Weerakkody | Dilhan Perera | 177/6 (45 overs) | 103 (38 overs) | SJC |
| 1988 | 14th | Oval | Asoka Jayamanne | Dilhan Perera | 181 (47.4 overs) | 127 (47.4 overs) | SJC |
| 1989 | 15th | Oval | Prasann Leanage | Roshan Anthony | 138/8 (47 overs) | 135 (48.3 overs) | SJC |
| 1990 | 16th | Oval | Orille de Mel | Indunil Anthony | 155 (48 overs) | 122 (41.2 overs) | SJC |
| 1991 | 17th | SSC | Viran Perera | Hemal Wimalasekera | 101 (39 overs) | 157/9 (45 overs) | SPC |
| 1992 | 18th | SSC | Sudantha Fernando | Asanaga Perera | 175 (48 overs) | 176/5 (45.2 overs) | SPC |
| 1993 | 19th | SSC | Praveen Fernando | Russel Arnold | 108 (40 overs) | 111/5 (35.5 overs) | SPC |
| 1994 | 20th | Oval | Peter Harmer | Fazal Mohammed | 181 (49.4 overs) | 214/8 (50 overs) | SPC |
| 1995 | 21st | SSC | Asela Pathirana | Damian Perera | 157 (48.4 overs) | 158/2 (39.2 overs) | SPC |
| 1996 | 22nd | Oval | Shalika de Mel | Manura Neomal | 91/3 (18.3 overs) | 90 (29.2 overs) | SJC |
| 1997 | 23rd | Oval | Trevine Mathews | Ramendra Nonis | 193/3 (39.4 overs) | 191/9 (50 overs) | SJC |
| 1998 | 24th | Oval | Monto Perera | Malinda Warnapura | 249/9 (50 overs) | 250/3 (44.1 overs) | SPC |
| 1999 | 25th | Oval | Roshan de Silva | Jerome Fernando | 271/6 (50 overs) | 232 (47.3 overs) | SJC |
| 2000 | 26th | Oval | Ian Daniel | Chrisantha Peiris | 143 (47.3 overs) | 208/9 (50 overs) | SPC |
| 2001 | 27th | Oval | Anuk de S Wijeyaratne | Malin Silva | 205/8 (50 overs) | 205 (49.4 overs) | Tied |
| 2002 | 28th | Oval | Joel Sabreen | Jehan Jayasuriya | 122 (38.1 overs) | 123/4 (28.5 overs) | SPC |
| 2003 | 29th | Oval | Deshan Bastianpillai | Nadhula de S Wijeyarathne | 217/7 (50 overs) | 58 (23.2 overs) | SJC |
| 2004 | 30th | R Premadasa Stadium | Ranesh Perera | Gihan de Silva | 258/6 (50 overs) | 233 (49.3 overs) | SJC |
| 2005 | 31st | R Premadasa Stadium | Hashan Goonatilleke | Prajeev Jansz | 185 (41 overs) | 257 (48.1 overs) | SPC |
| 2006 | 32nd | R Premadasa Stadium | Angelo Mathews | Hans Fernando | 113 (33.4 overs) | 153 (43.3 overs) | SPC |
| 2007 | 33rd | R Premadasa Stadium | Rajeewa Weerasinghe | Lahiru Peiris | 203/7 (45 overs) | 201 (47.4 overs) | SJC |
| 2008 | 34th | R Premadasa Stadium | Ruwantha Fernandopulle | Anuk Silva | 24/1 (6 overs) | 218/7 (50 overs) | No Decision |
| 2009 | 35th | R Premadasa Stadium | Sameera Weerasinghe | Angelo Perera | 215/9 (50 overs) | 333/7 (50 overs) | SPC |
| 2010 | 36th | Oval | Dinal Dambarage | Chathura Peiris | 202 (46.4 overs) | 203/5 (44.1 overs) | SPC |
| 2011 | 37th | Oval | Rosco Thatil | Denham Perera | 230/9 (50 overs) | 157 (40 overs) | SJC |
| 2012 | 38th | R Premadasa Stadium | Vidusha Jayasinghe | Shehan Fernando | 142 (42 overs) | 143/4 | SPC |
| 2013 | 39th | R Premadasa Stadium | Sachin Hewawasam | Dushan Hemantha | 194 (50 overs) | 163 (45.2 overs) | SJC |
| 2014 | 40th | R Premadasa Stadium | Dylan Fernandopulle | Kavinda De Tissera | 224/8 (50 overs) | 133 (41.4 overs) | SJC |
| 2015 | 41st | R Premadasa Stadium | Pathum Madusanka | Chandula Jayamanna | 99 (23 overs/ Target 159 in 29 overs) | 166/7 (38.4 overs) | SPC |
| 2016 | 42nd | R Premadasa Stadium | Kevin Corteling | Vinu Mohotty | 258/6 (50 overs) | 259/2 (39.1 overs) | SPC |
| 2017 | 43rd | SSC | Harin Cooray | Lakshina Rodrigo | 258 (49.4 overs) | 311/8 (50 overs) | SPC |
| 2018 | 44th | SSC | Jehan Daniel | Santhush Gunathilake | 259 (49.2 overs) | 172 (38.4 overs) | SJC |
| 2019 | 45th | SSC | Ashen Daniel | Ranmith Jayasena | 250 (49.3 overs) | 175/5 (41 overs /Target 185(D/L)) | SJC |
| 2020 | 46th | | Johanne De Zilva | Shannon Fernando | Not Played due to COVID-19 Pandemic. | | |
| 2021 | 47th | SSC | Sheran Fonseka | Nipunaka Fonseka | 200 (49.1 overs) | 115 (35.2 overs) | SJC |
| 2022 | 48th | SSC | Shevon Daniel | Wanuja Sahan | 219/9(50 overs) | 245/8 (50 overs) | SPC |
| 2023 | 49th | SSC | Sadeesh Jayawardana | Nimuthu Gunawardana | 156/10 (41.5 overs) | 158/5 (40.2 overs) | SJC |
| 2024 | 50th | SSC | Lahiru Amarasekara | Vishen Helambage | 229/10 (48.5 overs) | 230/7 (45.4 overs) | SPC |
| 2025 | 51st | SSC | Kenath Liyanage | Oween Salgado | 177/10 (49 overs) | 180/6 (45.5 overs) | SPC |
| 2026 | 52nd | SSC | Rishma Amarasinghe | Enosh Peterson | 233/6 (41.5 overs) | 231/9 (50 overs) | SJC |
| 1975–2026 | | | | | | | SJC 26 - SPC 23 |
