= Schoolboy Cricketer of the Year =

School Cricketers of the Year Award is an award given to school cricketers in Sri Lanka. It was first awarded by the patronage of Warner-Hudunut Ltd in 1978 and the Sunday Observer newspaper by Associated Newspapers of Ceylon Limited has been sponsoring the award since 1979 in collaboration with other companies such as Mobitel, Bata Shoes, and Warner-Hudnut. So far seven players have been able to win the award twice. Almost all the players that have won these awards went on to join the Sri Lanka national cricket team.

== List of winners ==
List of players to win the 'Schoolboy Cricketer of the Year' award
Year	Player name	School	Award Sponsor	Remarks
1975	Anura Ranasinghe	Nalanda College, Colombo		Not counted in the official series
1976	Anura Ranasinghe	Nalanda College, Colombo		Not counted in the official series
1978	Ranjan Madugalle	Royal College, Colombo	Observer-Haliborange Warner-Hudnut	Not counted in the official series. Test Cricket captain of Sri Lanka 1987–1988 and ICC Chief Match Referee
1979	Ranjan Madugalle	Royal College, Colombo	Observer-Haliborange Warner-Hudnut	
1980	Arjuna Ranatunga	Ananda College	Observer-Bata	Test and ODI Cricket captain of Sri Lanka 1989–1999. Sri Lanka won the 1996 Cricket World Cup under his captaincy.
1981	Rohan Buultjiens	St. Peter's College, Colombo	Observer-Bata	
1982	Arjuna Ranatunga	Ananda College	Observer-Bata	
1983	Roshan Mahanama	Nalanda College, Colombo	Observer-Bata	Played for Sri Lanka in Tests and ODIs. Former Sri Lanka ODI captain and ex-ICC Match Referee
1984	Roshan Mahanama	Nalanda College, Colombo	Observer-Bata	
1985	Asanka Gurusinha	Nalanda College, Colombo	Observer-Bata	Played for Sri Lanka in Tests and ODIs.
1986	Roshan Jurangpathy	Royal College, Colombo	Observer-Bata	
1987	Rohan Weerakkody	Saint Joseph's College, Colombo	Observer-Bata	
1988	Sanjeeva Ranatunga	Ananda College	Observer-Bata	
1989	Kumar Dharmasena	Nalanda College	Observer-Bata	Played for Sri Lanka in Tests and ODIs.
1990	Marvan Atapattu	Ananda College	Observer-Bata	Played for Sri Lanka in Tests and ODIs.
1991	Muttiah Muralitharan	St. Anthony's College, Kandy	Observer-Bata	Played for Sri Lanka in Tests and ODIs. Most wickets taker in world history.
1992	Sajith Fernando	St. Anthony's College, Kandy	Observer-Bata	
1993	Naveed Nawaz	DS Senanayake College, Colombo	Observer-Bata	
1994	Thilan Samaraweera	Ananda College	Observer-Bata	Played for Sri Lanka in Tests and ODIs.
1995	Thilan Samaraweera	Ananda College	Observer-Bata	
1996	Nimesh Perera	St. Sebastian's College, Moratuwa	Observer-Bata	
1997	Chinthaka Jayasinghe	Dharmapala Vidyalaya	Observer-Bata	
1998	Pradeep Hewage	St. Benedict's College, Colombo	Observer-Bata	
1999	Muthumudalige Pushpakumara	Ananda College	Observer-Bata	
2000	Kaushalya Weeraratne	Trinity College, Kandy	Observer-Bata	
2001	Kaushal Lokuarachchi	St Peter's College, Colombo	Observer-Bata	
2002	Sahan Wijeratne	Prince of Wales' College, Moratuwa	Observer-Bata	
2003	Farveez Maharoof	Wesley College, Colombo	Observer-Bata	Captain of Sri Lanka U19 team. Played for Sri Lanka in Tests and ODIs.
2004	Lahiru Peiris	St Peter's College, Colombo	Observer-Bata	
2005	Lahiru Peiris	St Peter's College, Colombo	Observer-Bata	
2006	Gihan Rupasinghe	Nalanda College	Observer-Bata	
2007	Malith Gunathilake	Ananda College	Observer-Bata	
2008	Umesh Karunarathne	Thurstan College	Observer – SLT Mobitel	
2009	Dinesh Chandimal	Ananda College	Observer – SLT Mobitel	Former Test, ODI, and T20I Captain. Also captained Sri Lanka in Hong-Kong-Sixes Tournament, and T10 Cricket League
2010	Bhanuka Rajapaksa	Royal College, Colombo	Observer – SLT Mobitel	
2011	Bhanuka Rajapaksa	Royal College, Colombo	Observer – SLT Mobitel	
2012	Niroshan Dickwella	Trinity College, Kandy	Observer – SLT Mobitel	Current Test, ODI, and T20
2013	Kusal Mendis	Prince of Wales' College, Moratuwa	Observer – SLT Mobitel	
2014	Sadeera Samarawickrama	Saint Joseph's College, Colombo	Observer – SLT Mobitel	
2015	Charith Asalanka	Richmond College, Galle	Observer – SLT Mobitel	
2016	Charith Asalanka	Richmond College, Galle	Observer – SLT Mobitel	
2017	Nipun Ransika	P de S Kularatne Vidyalaya, Ambalangoda	Observer – SLT Mobitel	
2018	Hasitha Boyagoda	Trinity College, Kandy	Observer – SLT Mobitel	
2019	Kamil Mishara	Royal College, Colombo	Observer – SLT Mobitel	
2020	Navod Paranavithana	Mahinda College, Galle	Observer – SLT Mobitel	
2021	Navod Paranavithana	Mahinda College, Galle	Observer – SLT Mobitel	
2022	Dunith Wellalage	Saint Joseph's College, Colombo	Observer – SLT Mobitel	
2023	Shevon Daniel	Saint Joseph's College, Colombo		
2024	Dinura Kalupahana	Mahinda College, Galle		
