= Clive Inman =

Ceylonese cricketer (1936–2022)

Personal information
- Full name: Clive Clay Inman
- Born: 29 January 1936; Colombo, British Ceylon
- Died: 7 December 2022 (aged 86); England
- Batting: Left-handed
- Bowling: Right-arm off-break
- Role: Batsman

Domestic team information
- Years: Team
- 1956–1966: Ceylon
- 1961–1971: Leicestershire

Career statistics
Competition	First-class	List A
Matches	255	60
Runs scored	13,113	1,237
Batting average	34.50	21.70
100s/50s	21/79	0/7
Top score	178	68
Balls bowled	103	0
Wickets	1	–
Bowling average	89.00	–
5 wickets in innings	0	–
10 wickets in match	0	–
Best bowling	1/30	–
Catches/stumpings	107/0	19/0
- Source: CricketArchive, 8 October 2022

Clive Clay Inman (29 January 1936 – 7 December 2022) was a Sri Lankan cricketer who played first-class cricket for Ceylon from 1956 to 1966 and for Leicestershire from 1961 to 1971.

== Cricket career ==
Inman attended St Peter's College, Colombo. He played for the school's senior cricket team for five seasons, and captained it to victory in the Battle of the Saints against St Joseph's College in his final season, 1954–55.

Inman made his first-class debut in 1956, representing Ceylon against India at the P Saravanamuttu Stadium. Although Inman didn't make an impact with the bat, he claimed the wicket of opener Nari Contractor. He would go on to play another 254 first-class matches but it would remain his only wicket.

A left-handed middle-order batsman, Inman made sporadic appearances for Ceylon in the Gopalan Trophy during the remainder of the decade before moving to England and joining his countryman Stanley Jayasinghe at Leicestershire. His first match for the English club came against the touring Australian side in 1961 when he contributed 30 and 45 not out. He had to wait until 1963 to make his County Championship debut and a few days later he scored his maiden first-class century against Cambridge University.

Inman was selected to tour England with the Ceylon team in 1968, but the tour was cancelled just before it was due to begin. He had his most prolific season in 1968, scoring 1735 runs at 36.91. Despite the high tally of runs he only scored one century that season. Only in his final county season, 1971, did he score four hundreds in a year. One of those came in his final ever first-class match, played against Northamptonshire at Grace Road.

Inman also played some List A cricket with Derbyshire in 1973.

In September 2018, he was one of 49 former Sri Lankan cricketers felicitated by Sri Lanka Cricket, to honour them for their services before Sri Lanka became a full member of the International Cricket Council (ICC).

== Personal life and death ==
Inman died in England on 7 December 2022, at the age of 86.
