= Shevon Daniel =

Sri Lankan cricketer

Personal information
- Born: 15 March 2004 (age 22); Colombo, Sri Lanka
- Batting: Left-handed
- Bowling: Right arm offbreak
- Role: Top-order batter

International information
- National side: Sri Lanka (2023-2024)
- Only ODI (cap 212): 11 January 2024 v Zimbabwe
- Only T20I (cap 101): 4 October 2023 v Afghanistan

Domestic team information
- Years: Team
- Sinhalese Sports Club
- Dambulla Giants

Career statistics
Competition	ODI	T20I	FC	LA
Matches	1	1	31	29
Runs scored	12	9	1707	617
Batting average	12.00	9.00	40.64	21.27
100s/50s	0/0	0/0	4/10	0/2
Top score	12	9	209	95
Balls bowled	0	0	90	6
Wickets	0	0	1	0
Bowling average	–	–	51.00	–
5 wickets in innings	0	0–	0	0
10 wickets in match	0	0	0	0
Best bowling	–	–	1/6	–
Catches/stumpings	0/–	0/–	10/–	13/–
- Source: Cricinfo, 5 December 2025

Shevon Daniel (born 15 March 2004) is a professional Sri Lankan cricketer who currently plays limited overs cricket for the national team. His elder brother Jehan Daniel is also a cricketer.

== Biography ==
He pursued his primary and secondary education at Saint Joseph's College, Colombo. He also played school cricket for St. Joseph's College and also captained his school cricket team. He also played age group rugby for his school team before specialising in the sport of cricket.

In July 2022, he captained St. Joseph's College in their 88th annual big match clash (which is popularly known as the Battle of the Saints) against rival school St. Peter's College and the match eventually ended in a draw.

== Youth career ==
He was a key member of the Sri Lanka national under-19 cricket team which emerged as runners-up to India during the 2021 ACC Under-19 Asia Cup.

In January 2022, he was named in Sri Lanka's squad for the 2022 ICC Under-19 Cricket World Cup in the West Indies.

He played for Gujranwala Giants in the inaugural edition of the Pakistan Junior League in 2022 and had a breakout tournament with the bat scoring 176 runs in 5 matches.

== Domestic career ==
He made his first-class cricket debut for Colombo against Jaffna on 24 February 2022 during the 2022 National Super League 4-Day Tournament at the Mahinda Rajapaksa International Cricket Stadium.

He made his T20 debut for Sinhalese Sports Club against Badureliya Sports Club on 22 May 2022 during the 2022 Major Clubs T20 Tournament at the Colombo Cricket Club Ground. On his professional T20 debut appearance, he smashed an unbeaten 59 off just 38 deliveries batting at number three and his knock came at a brisk strike rate of 155.26 which was also inclusive of 5 sixes. His knock propelled Sinhalese Sports Club to a decent total of 146/6 on the board which the team went onto defend successfully.

He made his List A debut for Sinhalese Sports Club against Saracens Sports Club on 27 June 2022 during the 2022-23 Major Clubs Limited Over Tournament.

He was shortlisted as one of the frontrunners to claim the prestigious Observer-Mobitel Schoolboy Cricketer of the Year award.

== Franchise cricket ==
He was signed by Dambulla Giants for the 2022 Lanka Premier League.

In November 2022, he was invited by Rajasthan Royals in its training camp ahead of the 2023 Indian Premier League.
