= Roshan Abeysinghe =

Sri Lankan cricketer, commentator, and businessperson

Personal information
- Full name: Lincoln Clement Roshan Abeysinghe
- Born: 10 February 1963 (age 63); Colombo, Dominion of Ceylon
- Batting: Right-handed
- Bowling: Right-arm off break
- Role: Batsman
- Source: Cricinfo, 12 December 2017

Lincoln Clement Roshan Abeysinghe (Sinhala: ලින්කන් ක්ලෙමන්ට් රොෂාන් අබේසිංහ: born 10 February 1963) is a Sri Lankan businessperson and international cricket commentator. He is also working as a marketing professional in a skincare company.

== Biography ==
Roshan Abeysinghe was born on 10 February 1963, in Colombo. He was educated and played school cricket at the St. Joseph's College. He is one of the first school boys to have played for St. Joseph's College in the Big match contests against St. Peter's College.

Abeysinghe has played club cricket in both two-day and one-day formats, and was captain of the Ragama Cricket Club, where he currently serves as president. He has also served as chairman of the Tournament Committee of the executive committee of Sri Lanka Cricket and as president of the Gampaha District Cricket Association.

Abeysinghe has been in broadcasting since 1995. He covered Sri Lanka's 1996 Cricket World Cup victory for a private radio station, and has since worked many international cricket broadcasts for several television and radio networks. He also writes commentary for several print media.

Roshan is one of only few international cricket commentators from Sri Lanka, along with Russel Arnold, Farveez Maharoof and Ranjit Fernando. He is working as an international cricket commentator in Test Match Special, a British radio programme covering about England related cricket matches and for the Ten Sports Network (now known as Sony Ten Network) from 2010 mainly related to Sri Lankan cricket matches. In 2016, he was named the Wisden Cricket Personality of the Month for his commentary services. Roshan Abeysinghe is a professional marketing personality apart from being a cricket commentator.
