= Kodithuwakku =

Kodithuwakku (Sinhala: කොඩිතුවක්කු), also spelled Kodituwakku, is a surname found in Sri Lanka. Notable people with the surname include:

== Kodithuwakku ==
- Chandrasiri Kodithuwakku (1949–2016), Sri Lankan actor
- Dulan Kodithuwakku (born 1990), Sri Lankan Paralympic track and field athlete
- Jagath Kodithuwakku, Sri Lankan army general
- Karunadasa Kodithuwakku (born 1961), Sri Lankan politician

== Kodituwakku ==
- Karunasena Kodituwakku (born 1945), Sri Lankan politician, academic, and diplomat
- Lakdasa Kodituwakku (1941 – 2002), Sri Lankan inspector of police
- Nagananda Kodituwakku (born 1954), Sri Lankan attorney-at-law
- Nihal Kodituwakku (born 1940), Sri Lankan former cricketer
- Parakrama Kodituwakku, Sinhala poet
- Ravindu Kodituwakku (born 1997), Sri Lankan cricketer
- Upali Kodituwakku (born 1964), Sri Lankan former cricketer
