= Ashley de Silva =

Sri Lankan cricketer (born 1963)

Personal information
- Full name: Ashley Matthew de Silva
- Born: 3 December 1963 (age 62); Colombo, Sri Lanka
- Batting: Right-handed

International information
- National side: Sri Lanka (1986–1993)
- Test debut (cap 55): 13 March 1993 v England
- Last Test: 27 July 1993 v India
- ODI debut (cap 44): 2 March 1986 v Pakistan
- Last ODI: 25 July 1993 v India

Domestic team information
- Years: Team
- 1982–1984: Tamil Union Cricket and Athletic Club
- 1986–1996: Colombo Cricket Club

Umpiring information
- LA umpired: 1 (2011)

Career statistics
Competition	Test	ODI
Matches	3	4
Runs scored	10	12
Batting average	3.33	6.00
100s/50s	0/0	0/0
Top score	9	8
Catches/stumpings	4/1	4/2
- Source: Cricinfo, 9 February 2006

Ashley Matthew de Silva (born 3 December 1963) is a former Sri Lankan cricketer who played in three Test matches and four One Day Internationals from 1986 to 1993. He is, as of 2019, CEO of Sri Lanka Cricket.

De Silva was born in 1963 in Colombo into a Roman Catholic family. He attended Saint Joseph's College, Colombo, where he played in four of the annual Battle of the Saints against St. Peter's College, Colombo, the last—in 1982—as captain. He became the first former Saint Joseph's player to play Test cricket.

De Silva began his domestic cricket career for Tamil Union Cricket and Athletic Club in the Lakspray Trophy. He later moved to Colombo Cricket Club where he was playing when the competition attained First-class cricket status in 1989.

After his playing career, de Silva became a referee as well as taking charge of one List A match as an umpire in 2011.

In 2013, de Silva became acting CEO of Sri Lanka Cricket, later taking on the role permanently.
