= Abu Fuard =

Sri Lankan cricketer and cricket administrator (1936–2012)

Personal information
- Full name: Mohamed Abdal Hassain Fuard
- Born: 6 December 1936; Ceylon
- Died: 28 July 2012 (aged 75); Colombo, Sri Lanka
- Batting: Right-handed
- Bowling: Right-arm off-spin

Career statistics
| Competition | First-class |
|---|---|
| Matches | 19 |
| Runs scored | 406 |
| Batting average | 14.00 |
| 100s/50s | 0/1 |
| Top score | 68 |
| Balls bowled | 3128 |
| Wickets | 51 |
| Bowling average | 26.17 |
| 5 wickets in innings | 1 |
| 10 wickets in match | 0 |
| Best bowling | 6/31 |
| Catches/stumpings | 12/0 |
- Source: ESPNcricinfo, 18 October 2015

Mohamed Abdal Hassain "Abu" Fuard (6 December 1936 – 28 July 2012) was a Sri Lankan cricketer who played first-class cricket for Ceylon from 1957 to 1970 and served for many years as a national cricket administrator.

== Playing career ==
Fuard was educated at Wesley College, Colombo, and played in turn for Moors Sports Club, Colts Cricket Club and Colombo Cricket Club. An off-spinner who sometimes opened the batting, he made his first-class debut in the Gopalan Trophy in 1956–57, taking two wickets and two catches and making 15 runs in a low-scoring victory for Ceylon. In the 1960-61 Gopalan Trophy match he top-scored in Ceylon's first innings with 68 batting at number 10, then took 3 for 44 and 2 for 75 in a 169-run victory for Ceylon.

He toured India with Ceylon in 1964-65 and played in all three matches against India but had little success with the ball, taking only two wickets. In the third match, however, when Ceylon needed 112 to win and the regular opener was injured, Fuard opened the batting on a difficult pitch and top-scored with 40 and Ceylon won by four wickets.

Against the International XI in 1967-68, Fuard took 6 for 31 in the first innings, but Derek Underwood responded with 15 wickets in the match for 43 runs and the International XI won easily. In single-innings matches against touring sides Fuard took the wickets of many prominent Test batsmen: Bill Lawry and Bob Simpson when the Australians visited in April 1961, Tom Graveney, Peter Parfitt, Ray Illingworth and Fred Titmus against MCC in October 1962, Norm O'Neill and Bob Cowper against the Australians in April 1964, Parfitt again, Mike Smith, John Murray and Jim Parks against MCC in October 1966, John Edrich against MCC in January 1969, and Doug Walters against the Australians in October that year. His last first-class wicket, in February 1970, was of Geoff Boycott.

== Administrative career ==
Fuard served as a cricket administrator, manager, curator, coach and national selector. He was manager and coach for Sri Lanka in the 1975 World Cup and assistant manager when Sri Lanka recorded their first win over a Test-playing nation during the 1979 World Cup. He also managed the team that won Sri Lanka's first Test victory, over India in September 1985, as well as the touring team to England in 1988.

A forceful man, Fuard was one of the principal administrators behind the successful push for Sri Lanka's admission to Test status. However, he could be difficult, and he made enemies as well as admirers. He was behind the appointment of two of the selectors for Ceylon's first-ever tour of England in 1968. The government was already reluctant to come up with the money to support the two-month tour, and when Fuard's two selectors chose themselves and Fuard in the touring team and omitted some prominent players, the resultant uproar among the cricket fraternity led the government to cancel the tour.

In his last years Fuard suffered from kidney failure and eventually blindness. He died in Colombo in July 2012, aged 75.
