= Pakistani cricket team in Sri Lanka in 1996–97 =

International cricket tour

Pakistan cricket team in Sri Lanka in 1996–97
	Sri Lanka	Pakistan
- Dates: 16 – 30 April 1997
Captains	Arjuna Ranatunga	Ramiz Raja

Test series
- Result: 2-match series drawn 0–0
Most runs	Aravinda de Silva (432)	Saleem Malik (237)
Most wickets	Chaminda Vaas (7)	Saqlain Mushtaq (14)
- Player of the series: Aravinda de Silva (SL)

The Pakistan national cricket team toured Sri Lanka from 16 to 30 April 1997. The tour included two Tests between Sri Lanka and Pakistan. Pakistan also played a first-class against Sri Lanka Board XI. The Test series ended in a draw with both matches drawn.

== Squads ==
Sri Lanka	Pakistan
Arjuna Ranatunga (c); Sanath Jayasuriya; Russel Arnold; Marvan Atapattu; Aravinda de Silva; Hashan Tillakaratne; Romesh Kaluwitharana (wk); Kumar Dharmasena; Chaminda Vaas; Nuwan Zoysa; Muttiah Muralitharan; Ruwan Kalpage; Sajeewa de Silva; Jayantha Silva	~~Wasim Akram (c)~~; Ramiz Raja (c); Saleem Elahi; Inzamam-ul-Haq; Ijaz Ahmed; Saleem Malik; Asif Mujtaba; Moin Khan (wk); Waqar Younis; Mohammad Zahid; Saqlain Mushtaq; Shahid Nazir; Mushtaq Ahmed

Pakistan's Waqar Younis was ruled out of the Test series due to a fractured toe on day two of the tour match against Sri Lanka Board XI. The captain of his side and fellow paceman Wasim Akram also returned home owing to a shoulder injury.

== Tour match ==
=== Two-day match: Sri Lanka Board XI vs Pakistan ===
16–17 April 1997
Scorecard

Sri Lanka Board XI	v	Pakistan
301 (85.3 overs); Russel Arnold 140; Waqar Younis 3/30 (11.3 overs)		281/8 (83 overs); Saleem Elahi 106 (r/h); Russel Arnold 3/7 (7 overs)

Match drawn
Police Park, Bambalapitiya

- Sri Lanka Board XI won the toss and elected to bat.

The Marvan Atapattu-led Sri Lanka Board XI won the toss and elected to bat first. Opening batsman Russel Arnold of the Nondescripts Cricket Club top-scored for his side making 140 in 381 minutes striking 20 fours through his innings. He shared a 104-run stand with Sanjeeva Ranatunga (52) for the second wicket, before both were dismissed by Mohammad Zahid. Chasing 301 in their first innings, Pakistan lost their captain Rameez Raja cheaply towards the end of play on day one. Saleem Elahi and Saleem Malik then went on to score centuries on day two, making 106 in 272 minutes and 100 in 184 minutes respectively. For the Board XI, Arnold also shone with the ball claiming three wickets for 7 runs helping reduce the opposition from 242/3 to 281/8 at the end of play.

== Test series ==
=== 1st Test ===
19–23 April 1997
Scorecard

Sri Lanka	v	Pakistan
330 (122.2 overs); Hashan Tillakaratne 103 (228); Saqlain Mushtaq 5/89 (44.2 overs)		378 (159.5 overs); Ijaz Ahmed 113 (245); Muttiah Muralitharan 6/98 (53 overs)
423/8d (155.1 overs); Aravinda de Silva 168 (383); Saqlain Mushtaq 4/137 (63 overs)

Match drawn
R. Premadasa Stadium, Colombo
Umpires: David Shepherd (Eng) and Udaya Wickramasinghe (SL)
Player of the match: Saqlain Mushtaq (Pak)

- Sri Lanka won the toss and elected to bat.
- Russel Arnold (SL) made his Test debut.

=== 2nd Test ===
26–30 April 1997
Scorecard

Sri Lanka	v	Pakistan
331 (112 overs); Aravinda de Silva 138 (208); Saqlain Mushtaq 4/115 (45 overs)		292 (108.3 overs); Moin Khan 98 (109); Sajeewa de Silva 5/85 (24.2 overs)
386/4d (95.5 overs); Sanath Jayasuriya 113 (212); Mushtaq Ahmed 3/113 (33 overs)		285/5 (95 overs); Saleem Malik 155 (240); Jayantha Silva 2/71 (28 overs)

Match drawn
Sinhalese Sports Club Ground, Colombo
Umpires: Peter Manuel (SL) and Ian Robinson (Zim)
Player of the match: Aravinda de Silva (SL)

- Sri Lanka won the toss and elected to bat.
- Sanath Jayasuriya (SL) and Moin Khan (Pak) passed 1,000 runs while Ijaz Ahmed (Pak) passed 2,000 runs in Tests.
- Aravinda de Silva scored his 10th century in Sri Lanka's second innings and became the first batsman ever to score two unbeaten centuries in the same Test.
- Sajeewa de Silva (SL) claimed his first five-wicket haul in Tests.
- Saleem Elahi kept wickets for Pakistan in the second innings due to an injury to Moin Khan.
