= Dhansiri Weerasinghe =

Sri Lankan cricketer (1936–2020)

Personal information
- Full name: Dhansiri H. A. Weerasinghe
- Born: 1936; Ceylon
- Died: 7 July 2020 (aged 83 or 84); Melbourne, Australia
- Batting: Right-handed

Career statistics
Competition	First-class
Matches	12
Runs scored	446
Batting average	23.47
100s/50s	0/3
Top score	92
Balls bowled	84
Wickets	0
Bowling average	–
5 wickets in innings	–
10 wickets in match	–
Best bowling	–
Catches/stumpings	5/–
- Source: Cricinfo, 14 April 2017

Dhansiri Weerasinghe (1936 – 7 July 2020) was a cricketer who played 12 matches of first-class cricket for Ceylon between 1958 and 1969.

Weerasinghe attended Ananda College in Colombo. On his first-class debut in 1957-58 he scored 57 against Mysore. He made his highest score of 92 when he captained Ceylon to a draw in the Gopalan Trophy match in 1968–69.

He toured India with the Ceylon team in 1964-65, playing in one of the three matches against India, but with little success. He was one of the selectors who included him in the Ceylon team to tour England in 1968, but the tour was cancelled just before it was due to begin.

Weerasinghe married Chatra Tennakoon in 1965, and they had three daughters. They migrated to Australia in 1974. He died in Melbourne in July 2020.
