= Lareef =

Lareef is both a given name and a surname. Notable people with the name include:

- Lareef Idroos (born 1940), Ceylon cricketer
- Adam Lareef (born 1980), Maldivian footballer
