= Sarath Wimalaratne =

Personal information
- Full name: Sarath Ransiri Wimalaratne
- Born: 14 June 1942 (age 84); Nawalapitiya, Ceylon
- Batting: Right-handed
- Bowling: Right-arm medium pace

Career statistics
Competition	First-class
Matches	10
Runs scored	220
Batting average	14.66
100s/50s	0/0
Top score	41*
Balls bowled	1366
Wickets	26
Bowling average	28.84
5 wickets in innings	2
10 wickets in match	1
Best bowling	5/32
Catches/stumpings	9/–
- Source: CricketArchive, 24 February 2017

Sarath Ransiri Wimalaratne (born 14 June 1942) is a former cricketer who played for Ceylon in the 1960s. He is now a physician in Sydney.

== Cricket career ==
Wimalaratne attended Ananda College, where he captained the cricket team in 1962 and toured India with a Ceylon schools team. He then went to the University of Ceylon, where he studied medicine.

He made his first-class debut in the Gopalan Trophy match in 1965–66, and was selected to tour Pakistan in 1966–67 with the Ceylon team. He played in all five first-class matches on the tour, including the three unofficial Tests against Pakistan. Although primarily an opening bowler, he achieved more with the bat on the tour. In the first match against Pakistan, batting at number 11, he top-scored with 41 not out in the first innings, while in the second match he opened the batting, scoring 28 and 27 and putting on 44 and 67 for the opening partnerships with Fitzroy Crozier, another bowler.

In the Gopalan Trophy match in 1967–68, Wimalaratne captained the Ceylon team and took 5 for 32 and 5 for 36 in the victory over Madras. He became disenchanted with cricket when he was not included in the team to make the planned tour of England in 1968; the tour was cancelled amid widespread dissatisfaction.

== Later life ==
Wimalaratne graduated in medicine from the University of Ceylon in 1971. He went to live in New Zealand in 1972, doing his internship in Dunedin, where he played senior club cricket, He moved to Australia in 1975. He lives in Sydney and practises as a GP in the suburb of North Strathfield.

He and his first wife Eva, a doctor from Poland, had a son and a daughter. After their divorce he married his brother's widow Nelun, and they had a daughter. They also divorced, and he now lives with his partner Anne, who was born in the Philippines.

In September 2018, Wimalaratne was one of 49 former Sri Lankan cricketers felicitated by Sri Lanka Cricket, to honour them for their services before Sri Lanka became a full member of the International Cricket Council (ICC).
