= Mano Ponniah =

Sri Lankan architect and cricketer

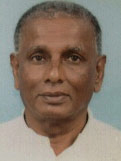

Personal information
- Full name: Charles Edward Manoharan Ponniah
- Born: 3 May 1942 (age 84); Kalutara, Ceylon
- Batting: Right-handed
- Bowling: Right-arm leg-spin

Domestic team information
- Years: Team
- 1967 to 1969: Cambridge University

Career statistics
Competition	First-class
Matches	45
Runs scored	1978
Batting average	25.03
100s/50s	1/11
Top score	101*
Balls bowled	190
Wickets	6
Bowling average	13.66
5 wickets in innings	1
10 wickets in match	0
Best bowling	5/20
Catches/stumpings	12/0
- Source: Cricket Archive, 28 December 2014

Charles Edward Manoharan "Mano" Ponniah (born 3 May 1943) is a Sri Lankan architect and engineer who played first-class cricket in Sri Lanka and England from 1964 to 1969.

== Cricket career in Ceylon ==
Mano Ponniah attended S. Thomas' College, Mount Lavinia, before studying engineering at the University of Ceylon. He was a member of the University team that won the P. Saravanamuttu Trophy in 1963.

He played for Ceylon as an opening batsman while still a student, making his first-class debut in the Gopalan Trophy match against Madras in 1963-64, when in 76.1 overs in the second innings he made 60 not out, Ceylon's highest score of the match, to help Ceylon to victory by six wickets. He toured India with Ceylon in 1964-65, playing in seven of the eight first-class matches and scoring 325 runs at an average of 25.00. He played in all three matches against India.

== Cricket career in England ==
In 1966, Ponniah went to Emmanuel College, Cambridge, to continue his studies. He played cricket for Cambridge University from 1967 to 1969. His best season was 1967, when in 13 matches he scored 800 runs at an average of 36.36. His highest score in 1967 was 98 not out against Middlesex, when he opened the innings and added 194 for the second wicket with Roger Knight.

Ponniah was selected to tour England with the Ceylon team in 1968, but the tour was cancelled just before it was due to begin. In 1968, Cambridge won no matches, and "despite a rather limited range of strokes" Ponniah scored their only century. In the match against Lancashire, he made 101 not out in the first innings and 67 in the second, while his team-mates made only 93 and 63 respectively. In his last match, against Oxford University in 1969, he made 27 and 50 not out, sharing an unbroken third-wicket partnership of 123 in 92 minutes with Knight.

== Architecture career ==
Ponniah worked in England until 1990, when he returned to Sri Lanka and founded the Colombo architectural firm Mano Ponniah & Associates. The firm has won several awards, including one for an ocean resort in the Maldives.

Ponniah and his wife Radhika, whom he married in 1971, have two sons.
