= Trevelyan Edward =

Personal information
- Full name: Trevelyan C. T. Edward
- Born: 1938; Ceylon
- Died: 8 November 1995 (aged 56–57); Sri Lanka
- Role: Opening batsman

Career statistics
Competition	First-class
Matches	9
Runs scored	416
Batting average	27.73
100s/50s	0/2
Top score	73
Catches/stumpings	4/–
- Source: Cricinfo, 14 April 2017

Trevelyan Edward (1938 – 1995) was a cricketer who played nine matches of first-class cricket for Ceylon between 1961 and 1965.

Trevelyan Edward attended S. Thomas' College, Mount Lavinia. An opening batsman who wore spectacles, he made his debut for Ceylon in the Gopalan Trophy match in 1960–61, opening with A. C. M. Lafir. In the 1961–62 Gopalan Trophy match he made his highest first-class score, 73, in an innings victory for Ceylon.

Edward toured India with the Ceylon team in 1964–65, playing in all three matches against India. In the first two matches he was one of Ceylon's more successful batsmen, with scores of 38, 31, 53 and 15. In the third and last match, while he was fielding in the slips in the Indian first innings, a ball struck him over the eye, breaking his spectacles and necessitating several stitches in the wound. He could play no further part in the game, which Ceylon nevertheless won, their first victory in a full international match. It was his last first-class match, but he continued to play domestic cricket for Nondescripts.
