= Herbert Fernando =

Personal information
- Full name: Herbert Innocent Kingsley Fernando
- Born: 4 January 1933 (age 93); Jaffna, Ceylon
- Batting: Right-handed
- Role: Wicket-keeper

Career statistics
Competition	First-class
Matches	36
Runs scored	1027
Batting average	18.67
100s/50s	1/3
Top score	102*
Balls bowled	0
Wickets	–
Bowling average	–
5 wickets in innings	–
10 wickets in match	–
Best bowling	–
Catches/stumpings	71/29
- Source: CricketArchive, 22 February 2017

Herbert Innocent Kingsley Fernando (born 4 January 1933) is a former cricketer who was Ceylon's principal wicket-keeper from 1953 to 1970. He was also a doctor and a brigadier in the Sri Lanka Army.

== Life and career ==
Born in Jaffna, Herbert Fernando attended St Peter's College, Colombo, where he captained the cricket team in 1951 and 1952 and was schoolboy cricketer of the year in 1952. He went on to the University of Ceylon, graduating as a doctor in 1961.

A wicketkeeper-batsman, he made his first-class debut in the inaugural Gopalan Trophy match in February 1953. A month later he made his international debut for Ceylon in a one-day match against the visiting Australians.

He continued to represent Ceylon throughout the 1950s and 1960s. He led the Ceylon team that toured Malaya and Singapore in 1957, and was the chief wicket-keeper in Ceylon's two major tours in the 1960s, to India in 1964-65 and Pakistan in 1966-67. When Ceylon won their first major international victory, against India in Ahmedabad on the 1964-65 tour, he took four catches and three stumpings, as well as scoring 38 not out, the second-top score, in Ceylon's first innings. He scored his only first-class century in the Gopalan Trophy in 1965–66, when he made 102 not out to ensure a draw after the Ceylon team had followed on 255 behind. He compiled over 10000 runs in the highest level of local cricket, and was the top career run scorer in the Sara Trophy period of Ceylon cricket.

He captained the Ceylon team on several occasions and was the national chairman of selectors when Sri Lanka first played Test cricket in 1982. He was one of the selectors who chose him to captain the Ceylon team to tour England in 1968, but the tour was cancelled just before it was due to begin.

Fernando was commissioned in the Army as a captain in 1963 and rose to the rank of brigadier in 1983, when he was Director of Army Medical Services. As the Director of Welfare and Rehabilitation he established the Ranaviru Sevana Centre for veterans at Ragama. He received the decoration O.St.J. in 1993 in recognition of his work in this area.

In September 2018, he was one of 49 former Sri Lankan cricketers felicitated by Sri Lanka Cricket, to honour them for their services before Sri Lanka became a full member of the International Cricket Council (ICC).
