= Lasantha =

Lasantha is a given name. Notable people with the name include:

- Lasantha Alagiyawanna (born 1967), Sri Lankan politician
- Lasantha Rodrigo (born 1938), Sri Lankan cricketer
- Lasantha Wickrematunge (1958–2009), Sri Lankan journalist, politician, and human rights activist
