= Ceylonese cricket team in India in 1964–65 =

International cricket tour

The Ceylon cricket team toured India in December 1964 and January 1965. Ceylon did not then have Test status, but three four-day unofficial Tests were played, India winning 2–1. The tour also included five other first-class matches.

Ceylon's victory in the third unofficial Test was its first victory over a Test-playing nation. It is still Sri Lanka's only victory over India in India. Ceylon had previously beaten a Pakistan A team in Colombo in August 1964.

== The Ceylon team ==
- Michael Tissera (captain)
- Neil Chanmugam
- Premachandra de Silva
- Muttaiah Devaraj
- Sylvester Dias
- Trevelyan Edward
- Ranjit Fernando
- Herbert Fernando
- Norton Fredrick
- Abu Fuard
- Lareef Idroos
- Stanley Jayasinghe
- Darrell Lieversz
- Anurudda Polonowita
- Mano Ponniah
- Lasantha Rodrigo
- Dhansiri Weerasinghe

Of the 17 tourists, 13 (all but Devaraj, Dias, Ranjit Fernando and Idroos) appeared in the three-match series against India. India used 19 players. The Ceylon manager was Nissal Seneratne.

== The tour ==
After a drawn match against Indian Universities in Madras, the Ceylon team played India in Bangalore. The strong Indian team won easily: batting first, they scored 508 for 4 (centuries to Dilip Sardesai and Hanumant Singh) before declaring and dismissing Ceylon for 205 and 257, B. S. Chandrasekhar taking five wickets in each innings.

The second unofficial Test followed in Hyderabad a few days later and resulted in another clear win for India. India declared at 505 for 6 (centuries to M. L. Jaisimha and Chandu Borde), dismissed Ceylon for 280 and 378, then scored 154 for 3 (a century to Farokh Engineer) to win by seven wickets. Stanley Jayasinghe, who had scored 20 and 63 (top score) in the first match, top-scored in each innings with 78 and 135 in this second match, and Michael Tissera scored 26 and 122. Ceylon then drew against Maharashtra, and lost by nine wickets in Baroda to an inexperienced Indian Board President's XI which included only one Test player.

For the third match in the series in Ahmedabad, India made six changes, creating a much younger team. The first day was washed out, and play did not begin until late on the second day. The pitch remained damp throughout the match. On the third day India were dismissed for 189, Jayasinghe taking 6 for 38 and Norton Fredrick 4 for 85. During the innings a ball struck Ceylon's opening batsman Trevelyan Edward, fielding in slips, over the eye, breaking his spectacles and necessitating several stitches in the wound. He could play no further part in the game, so Ceylon batted in both innings with only ten men available. At stumps on the third day Ceylon were 144 for seven. Sensing that dew would make the pitch difficult for batting on the final morning, Tissera declared at the overnight score, 45 runs in arrears, and Fredrick, Jayasinghe and Anurudda Polonowita each took three wickets in dismissing India for 66 in 26.4 overs. Ceylon reached their target of 112 in 55.2 overs, Tissera hitting the winning runs.

The remaining two matches, against Bombay and Madras, were drawn.

== Leading players ==
In the three matches against India, Jayasinghe was Ceylon's outstanding player, making 318 runs at an average of 53.00, and taking nine wickets at 16.33. Tissera was the next most successful batsman, with 249 runs at 49.80, and Fredrick the next most successful bowler, with eight wickets at 27.87.
