= Wimalaratne =

Wimalaratne is both a given name and a surname. Notable people with the name include:

- Wimalaratne Kumaragama (1919–1962), Sri Lankan poet
- Sarath Wimalaratne (born 1942), Ceylonese cricketer
- Vijaya Wimalaratne (1940–1992), Sri Lanka Army officer
