= St. Anne's College, Kurunegala =

St. Anne's College – Kurunegala
- සාන්ත ආනා විදුහල
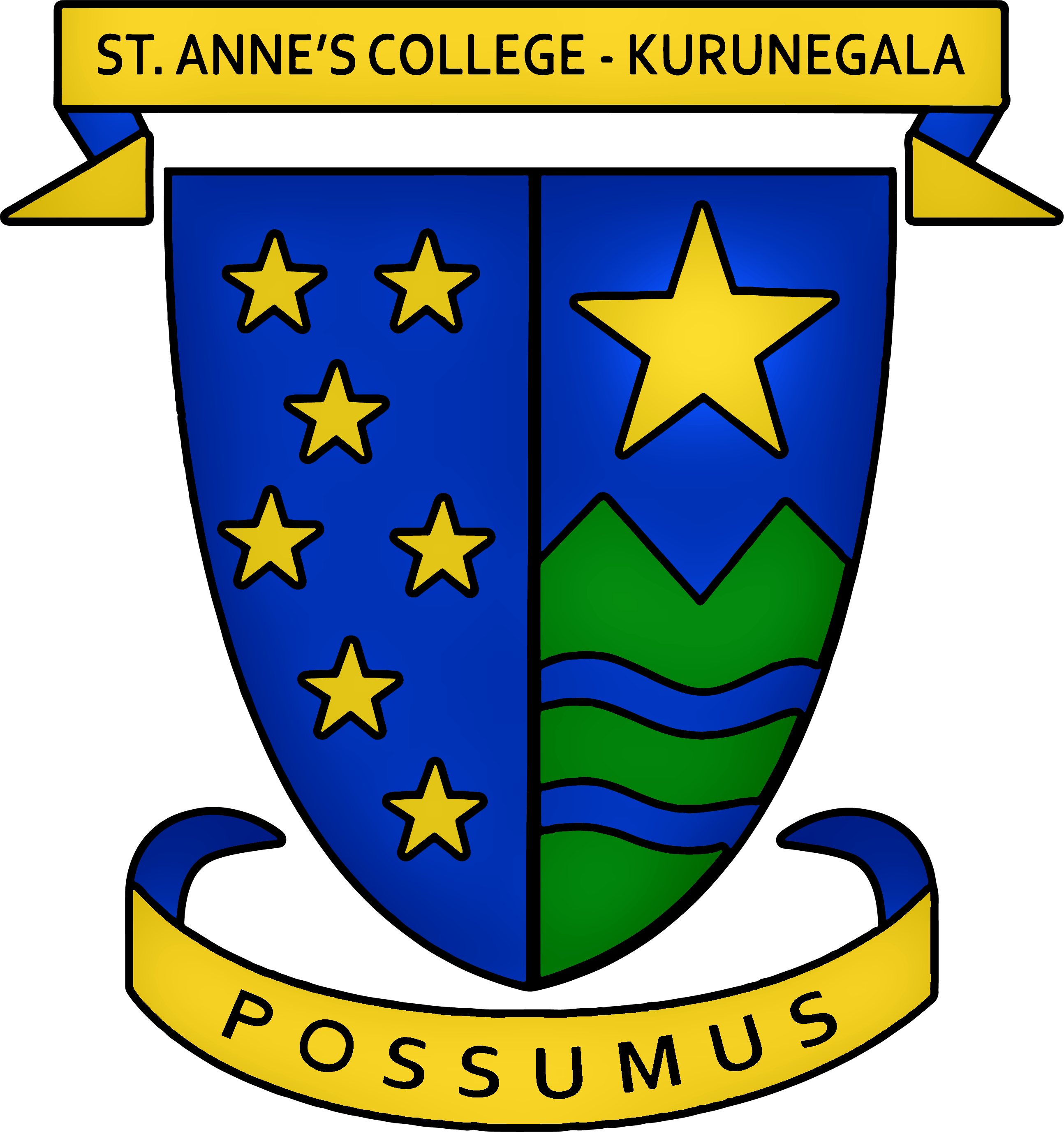
- School Crest

Location
- St. Anne's Street; 7°29′15″N 80°21′34″E; Kurunegala, Sri Lanka, North Western, 60000; Sri Lanka

Information
- School type: National
- Motto: Latin: POSSUMUS (We can!)
- Founder: Hugh Ferrington
- Status: Open
- Principal: Chandana Hapuarachchi
- Grades: Class 1 – 13
- Gender: Boys
- Age: 6 to 19
- Enrollment: 3,000+
- Language: Sinhala & English
- Hours in school day: 6
- Classrooms: 70+
- Area: 12 acres (49,000 m^{2})
- Houses: De La Salle, Benildus, Solomon, Miguel
- Colours: Green, gold, blue
- Song: "Come boys for the honours of the green, gold and blue"
- Pupils: Annites
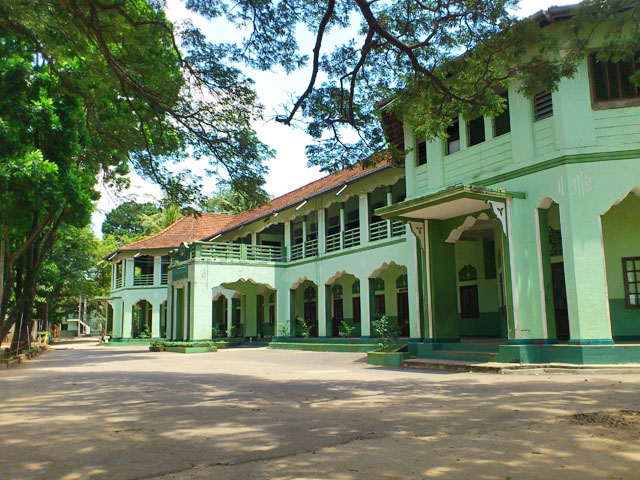
- Main Building

St. Anne's College, Kurunegala, is a Roman Catholic boys' school located in Kurunegala, Sri Lanka. Established by Francis Saviour in 1867. Students of St. Anne's College are known as Annites.

== School ==
=== Location ===
Situated in central area of Kurunegala, it occupies 49,000 m^{2} (530,000 sq ft) along St. Anne's Street, boarded by Holy Family Convent to the east, St. Anne's Cathedral to the west and Maliyadeva College to the north.

=== Administration ===
The college is funded by Ministry of Education. The principal is the head of the school and is appointed by De La Salle Brothers. The principal is assisted by two vice principals and an assistant principal. The school is divided into primary school and upper school. The primary school is overseen by a deputy principal. The college educates close to 3,000 students in both secondary and primary education. The administration of the college hostel is carried out by a warden under the supervision of the principal.

Since its establishment the main medium of education had been English; however, with Sinhala becoming the official language, the medium of education was changed to Sinhala. Since 2002 English has been reintroduced as a medium of education at the college. Students may select one of the two mediums after grade 5 in which to conduct their studies.

=== Admission ===
Admission to the school is very competitive. Students who qualify requirements can enter grade 1. Also, students can enter through grade 5 government scholarship exam and GCE Ordinary Level in Sri Lanka.

=== Grounds ===
The school is located in an area of 4.9 ha (12 acres) where the primary school and the upper school are located. It is equipped with facilities such as science and computer laboratories, classrooms, etc. This includes the 'La Salle Auditorium' which is one of the biggest auditoria in the area.

Sport plays a major part in the school's activities. The school's facilities include a swimming pool and a modern cricket ground, and basketball courts within the school premises.

== History ==
=== The beginning ===
It was 1867 which laid the foundation to the school in Sri Lanka, the Roman Catholic English School, in Kurunegala. It was initiated by the parish priest of Kurunegala church, Francis Saviour. There were 28 boys and 19 girls enrolled on the first year with two teachers. The medium of the language was only English.

But with the intention of putting up a boys only school, the school was renamed to St. Anne's Boys College in 1881, with the guidance of the Kurunegala parish priest Adrian Dufo, during the term of Apostolic Vicariate of Jaffna Bishop Christophe Ernest Bonjean. The number of pupils on roll in 1881 was 101 and the first headmaster was B. S. Peterson.

It was on the invitation and recommendation of C. L. W. Perera that the De La Salle Brothers acceding to the request of the Archbishop, assumed duties at St. Anne's College on 1 December 1934 after purchasing the present land of 49,000 square metres (12 acres) for Rs. 15,000. The arrival of the De La Salle Brothers to the city, paved the way for the awakening of both discipline and quality education.

Hugh Ferrington was the first Director of the institution. He formed the Old Boys Association in 1935 and on 9 June of the same year the old Boys Day was inaugurated and then on 1 March 1940, The President Of the Old Boys Association is Attorney at Law, Felician Perera, the son of C. L. W. Perera. The first prize-giving was held in the open air under the directorship of Casimir Ernest, a Czech Brother.

The foundation stone for the first building was laid in 1941, and the Brothers together with 360 boys and 50 boarders moved into the new uncompleted building in 1942. Brother Theodoret of Mary succeeded Brother Casimir on 20 August 1943. He set up a laboratory and started Science studies.

=== Golden era ===
Alban Patrick assumed the directorship in 1946 when the golden era of St. Anne's begins. St. Anne's becomes a Grade 1 School, the only one in the North Western Province in 1947, the results of public examination continue to be the best in the province, the student population rises to 1340 by 1955, the science block is declared open in 1949, which was donated by C. L. W. Perera an eminent criminal lawyer of the country who was also a benefactor of the school and who was honoured by the pope by a knighthood for the services rendered to the Catholic Church. In the same year, the Main block is completed, a Cadet Corps is started in 1952, 1953 marks the rise of the two-storied primary block. By 1954 most of the buildings are completed and the school is in a solid footing.

=== Free education ===
The implementation of the Free Education Scheme in 1951 opened the door to the Secondary Education for the poorest boys. From 1950 to 1960 Annites did well at the University Entrance and students entered yearly to the various faculties of university.

=== Acquisition by the government ===
The School take over was in 1960. At first, the school opted to remain private. But after struggling to maintain the status for a few years the school was handed over to the Government in 1964 during the term of the Director, Edwin Ambrose. Thus the college obtained the status of a Non-Fee Levying School. Since then the succeeding Brother Principals attempted to keep up the rising standard of St. Anne's College in spite of the changing educational environment.

== School traditions ==
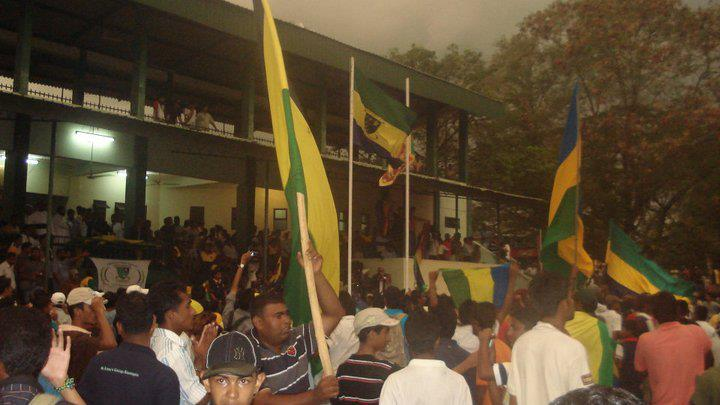
St. Anne's College Flag

The college motto is "Possumus", meaning "We Can" in Latin. Although the school is having affiliations with the Catholic Church, it is a secular school with students of all faiths admitted.

=== Anthem ===
"Green, Gold and Blue" was the very first college anthem sung by the students of St. Anne's College. Hugh Faringdon introduced this anthem on 21 May 1936. a fellow director who was well versed in literature and music wrote the lyrics and composed the music of this anthem.

== Houses ==
The House system was inaugurated on 10 June 1936 by Hugh Faringdon. St.John and St. De La Salle were the first two houses. House competition included games, conduct and studies. HouseMaster, Captains, Prefects and Games Captains were elected annually.

The students are divided into four Houses:

- – De La Salle House

John Baptist De La Salle was born on 30 April 1661 in Rheims, France. He founded the congregation of the Brothers of the Christian Schools (De La Salle Brothers) in 1680. He died on 7 April 1719. He was canonised on 24 May 1900 by Pope Leo XIII. On 15/05/1950 Pope Pius XII proclaimed him "Patron of all Teachers of Youth". His feast is held on 15 May.

- – Benildus House

Benildus House was introduced by Alban Patrick in 1948 discontinuing John House. Bénilde Romançon, was born on 14 June 1805 in Thuret, Puy-de-Dôme, France. He did nothing extraordinary but carried out his daily tasks in the primary schools to perfection. He died on 13 August 1862. He was canonised on 29 October 1967 by Pope Paul VI. His feast is held on 13 August.

- – Solomon House

Solomon House was introduced as the third House by Kasimir Arnost on 14/06/1938. Salomon Leclerc, F.S.C. was born on 14 November 1745 in Boulogne, France. He was Secretary-General of the De La Salle Brothers. He was martyred on 2 September 1792. He was beatified on 17 October 1926 by Pope Pius XI. His feast is held on 2 September.

- – Miguel House

Miguel House was introduced as the fourth House in 1985 by Augustine Brendon. Miguel Febres Cordero was born on 7 November 1854 in Cuenca Ecuador. He was a man of uncommon intelligence and incredible capacity to work. He died on 9 February 1910. He was canonised on 21 August 1984. His feast is held on 9 February.

== Sports ==
=== Cricket ===
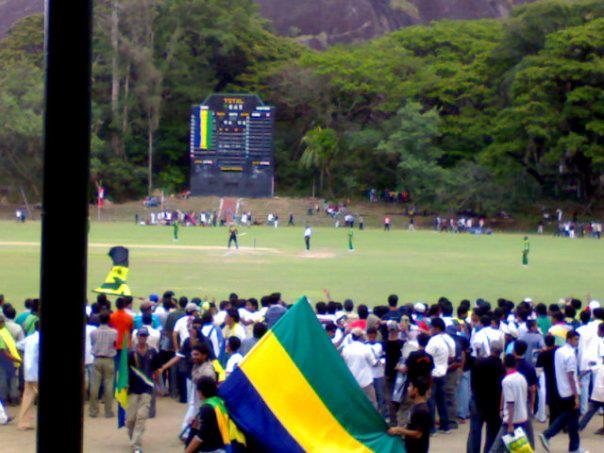
29th Annual Cricket Contest

Battle of the Rocks is an annual Cricket match played between St. Annes College and Maliyadeva College at the Welagedara Stadium, Kurunegala. The match is played over two days and the winner is presented with a trophy. The two-day match is followed by a one-day match between the two sides, which started in 1992.

2024 marked the 40th two-day encounter and 27th limited-overs version of Battle of the Rocks.

== Principals ==
Hugh Faringdon was the first principal, and the current principal is Chandana Hapuarachchi. Traditionally a De La Salle brother is the school's principal.

Name	Entered office	Departed Office
Bro.Hugh Faringdon	1934	1938
Bro.Kazimir Arnost	1938	1943
Bro.Theotoret of Mary	1943	1946
Bro.Alban Patrick	1946	1955
Bro.Lawrence Justinian	1955	1961
Bro.Ladislaus Bonifac	-	1961
Bro.Alexander Paul	1962	1963
Bro.Edwin Ambrose	1964	1966
Bro.Cassian Charles	1966	1971
Bro.Alexander Cyrillus	1971	1975
Bro.Lewis of Jesus	1975	1976
Bro.Alexander Cyrillus	1976	1979
Bro.Augustine Brendon	1979	1986
Bro.Eustace Bastian	1986	1992
Bro.Ignatius Warnakula	1992	1998
Mr.D.C.H.Jayasinghe	1998	1999
Fr.Marius Fernando	1999	2000
Bro.Denzil Mendis	2000	2012
Bro.Ernest Tarcisius	2013	2019
Rev. Fr. Chandana Hapuarachchi	2019	present

== Rivalries ==
St. Anne's College's maintains a rivalry with Maliyadeva College, Kurunegala and a long familial relationship with Holy Family Convent, Kurunegala.

== Notable alumni ==
This is a list of notable alumni from St. Anne's College, Kurunegala.

Name	Notability	Reference
Lanka de Silva	International Cricket Player(1997)	
Lionel Fernando (cricketer)	Ceylon Cricket Player (1964 to 1971).	
Sameera de Zoysa	Cricketer player	
Dilantha Malagamuwa	Racing car driver (1979–present)	
Ananda Wedisinghe	Racing car driver (1988 to 2017)	
Wijeratne Warakagoda	Award-winning actor	
Johnston Fernando	Politician, Cabinet Minister of Road development	
R. Sampanthan	Politician, lawyer, former leader of the opposition.	
Ashoka Abeysinghe	MP, former Deputy Minister of Transport and Civil aviation	
Douglas Ranasinghe	Actor, dramatist, director, writer, broadcaster	
Ariya Rekawa	Governor of Uva province	
Indika Bandaranayake	MP, former Deputy Minister of Housing and Construction	
