= Russel Arnold =

Sri Lankan former cricketer

Personal information
- Full name: Russel Premakumaran Arnold
- Born: 25 October 1973 (age 53); Colombo, Sri Lanka
- Batting: Left-handed
- Bowling: Right-arm off break
- Role: All-rounder

International information
- National side: Sri Lanka (1997–2007)
- Test debut (cap 68): 19 April 1997 v Pakistan
- Last Test: 1 July 2004 v Australia
- ODI debut (cap 91): 6 November 1997 v South Africa
- Last ODI: 28 April 2007 v Australia
- Only T20I (cap 1): 15 June 2006 v England

Career statistics
Competition	Test	ODI	T20I
Matches	44	180	1
Runs scored	1,821	3,950	7
Batting average	28.01	35.26	7.00
100s/50s	3/10	1/28	0/0
Top score	123	103	7
Balls bowled	1,334	2,157	–
Wickets	11	40	–
Bowling average	54.36	43.47	–
5 wickets in innings	0	0	–
10 wickets in match	0	0	–
Best bowling	3/76	3/47	–
Catches/stumpings	51/–	48/–	0/–
Medal record
Men's Cricket
Representing Sri Lanka
ICC Cricket World Cup
Runner-up	2007 West Indies
ICC Champions Trophy
Winner	2002 Sri Lanka
- Source: ESPNcricinfo, 2 May 2016

Russel Premakumaran Arnold (Tamil: ரசல் பிரேம்குமாரன் அர்னால்ட்; born 25 October 1973), or Russel Arnold, is a Sri Lankan cricket commentator and former cricketer of Tamil descent, who played all forms of the game. He played as the finisher role in the Sri Lankan team batting down the order at international level. He was the first Twenty20 International cap for Sri Lanka as he was part of Sri Lanka's first ever T20I team. With Sri Lanka, he was a part of the team which were joint-winners with India at the 2002 ICC Champions Trophy. He retired from cricket in 2007 after playing the final in 2007 ICC Cricket World Cup.

== Early life ==
Arnold was encouraged to take the sport of cricket by his grandfather. He played school cricket at the St. Peter's College, Colombo where he received his primary and secondary education. He played for Sri Lanka Under19 cricket team and impressed in the tour of England in a 3 match test series in 1992 where he scored 242 runs at the average of 48.40. He first arrived to domestic cricket in 1993 at the age of 20.

== International career ==
Arnold made his Test debut against Pakistan on April and his One day international debut against South Africa later in the year on 6 November 1997. His test debut came as a blessing in disguise as he came as an injury replacement to Roshan Mahanama who was injured in a batting session in the nets. He was initially called into the Sri Lankan reserve squad for the home series against Pakistan in 1997 following his performances in domestic circuit.

Originally an opening batsman, Arnold has since moved down the batting order mainly due to the rise of Marvan Atapattu. He is most famous in the pearl island as a very versatile player, making him ideally suitable for the limited over version of the game. However, when he started his career, he was seen primarily as a solid top order batsmen where he impressed against Australia during the AIWA Cup of 1999, as well as the subsequent test series against them, where he batted at no 3. He batted at no 6 for the first time in his career during the Coca-Cola Champions Trophy 1999. The then Sri Lankan team head coach Dav Whatmore had felt that Russel could be utilised well when he plays down the order.

In an ODI match against Zimbabwe in 1999, Arnold along with Sajeewa de Silva set the record for the highest 10th wicket stand for Sri Lanka in ODI history (51). During the final of the 2000–01 Sharjah Champions Trophy against India in 2000 at Sharjah, Arnold helped Sanath Jayasuriya to post his highest individual score of 189. Sanath and Arnold had a good partnership until Sanath stumped after a brilliant 189. Russel provided good support scoring unbeaten 52 off 62 balls in the match. Sri Lanka eventually won the final by a big margin of 245 runs. He was part of the Sri Lankan team captained by Sanath Jayasuriya which won the 2002 ICC Champions Trophy jointly with India.

The failure at the 2003 Cricket World Cup saw him sidelined for many months as selectors opted to groom the youngsters into the team. However, he fought his way back into the team with a string of scores in domestic cricket for his club, Nondescripts. He is known to work well under pressure and has dragged Sri Lanka out of many sticky situations. He is known for his gritty qualities and teamwork ability. He is a No. 6; he is a Methodist Christian of Tamil descent.

Arnold has been nicknamed "Rusty" by Roshan Mahanama and Pramodya Wickramasinghe, due to it being a very common nickname for the name Russel, and for his batting style as tough and durable, though not really pretty. His late cut shot is admired by many critics at that time where he used the shot so often to spin bowling.

Arnold made his T20I debut against England on 15 June 2006, which was incidentally Sri Lanka's first-ever T20I match. It was also his only T20I match in his career and Sri Lanka won the match by two runs.

=== Retirement ===
During April 2007 he announced, through team manager Michael Tissera, that he intended to retire from international cricket after the 2007 ICC Cricket World Cup final, which came as a shock to Sri Lankan cricket. He cited the pressure of too much travel as his reason.

After retirement, he played A-grade cricket in Sydney for Hornsby District Cricket Club and has also played numerous games for the Melbourne Super Kings in Melbourne. He also played for Chennai Superstars in the Indian Cricket League. He also coached at Barker College, a prestigious private school in Sydney's north. He also was assistant coach to Deccan Chargers in the IPL before the team was removed from the competition.

In 2018, he was appointed as the tournament director of the Lanka Premier League by the Sri Lanka Cricket but the proposed 2018 edition of the LPL was cancelled due to the dissolution of the Sri Lanka Cricket Board. He also played for Sri Lanka Legends in 2020-21 Road Safety World Series which was captained by Tillakaratne Dilshan and Sri Lanka Legends became runners up to India Legends in the final.

== Post-retirement career ==
Arnold is now a popular television commentator and also writes a weekly Q+A column on Island Cricket. Russel also keeps his fans entertained using his iPhone app 'Ask Rusty' launched in 2012. It was launched in 2012 along with the T20 World Cup. The iPhone app allows Russel's fans to ask questions directly from Russel Arnold. In addition, it consists of feeds of Russel's match predictions where the user can actively participate in voting. He also wrote articles for ESPNcricinfo for brief stint. He also worked as a radio broadcaster for a short period of time.

On 1 December 2016, Arnold won the Dialog Sri Lanka Cricket awards for the International Commentator of the year 2015. He is currently regarded as just one of two Sri Lankan international cricket commentators alongside Roshan Abeysinghe. He has worked as a commentator in international cricket matches involving Sri Lanka as well as worked as commentator in Test Match Special, Indian Premier League, 2020 Lanka Premier League. He has also engaged in giving commentary in Tamil during a pre match analysis prior to the start of a test match between India and Sri Lanka in 2017 and in the 2020 Indian Premier League for Star Sports Tamil.

Following the success of Russel's comic strip "Chilling with Russel" during the Road Safety World Series, he launched his YouTube Channel Talk show alongside friend and Manager Shyam Impett titled "Chilling With Russel" in July 2021.

In August 2021, he was appointed as the mentor of the Northern Rangers PUBG Mobile team for the Gamer.LK's Singer Esports Premier League.

== Controversies ==
During the final of the 2002 ICC Champions Trophy, which was held in Sri Lanka, Indian skipper Sourav Ganguly became frustrated with Arnold who was seen stepping onto the main danger area of the pitch while batting and Ganguly gave him warning to avoid stepping into the danger area of the pitch.

He along with four Sri Lankan players were banned by Sri Lanka Cricket from taking part in domestic cricket competitions in Sri Lanka after taking part in the unofficial Indian Cricket League in 2007. Russel was alleged that he retired from international cricket in order to play in the Indian Cricket League but he rubbished the claims. A year later in 2008, Sri Lanka Cricket lifted the ban imposed on all five players and they were allowed to return to Sri Lankan domestic cricket circuit.
