= Nihal Kodituwakku =

Sri Lankan cricketer

Personal information
- Full name: Nihal Senaka Hewavitharana Mudiange Ralahamilage Kodituwakku
- Born: 23 July 1940 (age 86); Colombo, Ceylon
- Batting: Right-handed

Career statistics
Competition	First-class
Matches	6
Runs scored	246
Batting average	22.36
100s/50s	0/1
Top score	87
Catches/stumpings	3/–
- Source: Cricinfo, 24 February 2017

Nihal Kodituwakku (born 23 July 1940) is a former cricketer who played for Ceylon in the 1960s.

== Cricket career ==
Kodituwakku attended Royal College, Colombo, where he played in the cricket team. Short of stature, he became an opening batsman, strong on the back foot and against the short ball. He made his first-class debut in the Gopalan Trophy match in 1965–66, scoring 87 in the second innings after the Ceylon team had been forced to follow on 255 runs behind. He toured Pakistan in 1966-67 with the Ceylon team.

== Later career ==
Kodituwakku worked in advertising for J. Walter Thompson before going to manage his family's estate at Wariyapola. He coached the cricket teams at a number of schools, including Maliyadeva College, Royal College and S. Thomas' College, Mount Lavinia. He officiated as a match referee in domestic first-class and List A matches from 2002 to 2011. In September 2018, he was one of 49 former Sri Lankan cricketers honoured by Sri Lanka Cricket for their services before Sri Lanka became a full member of the International Cricket Council.

He lives in Kottawa with his second wife, Orema. They have two daughters. He also has two daughters from his first marriage.
