= Lionel Fernando (cricketer) =

Sri Lankan-born Australian cricketer (1939–2026)

Personal information
- Born: 21 October 1939; Negombo, British Ceylon
- Died: 31 March 2026 (aged 86); Melbourne, Australia
- Batting: Right-handed
- Role: Batsman

Career statistics
Competition	First-class
Matches	12
Runs scored	488
Batting average	27.11
100s/50s	0/3
Top score	72 not out
Catches/stumpings	9/0
- Source: Cricket Archive, 20 February 2017

Lionel Fernando (21 October 1939 – 31 March 2026) was a Sri Lankan-born Australian cricketer who played for Ceylon from 1964 to 1971.

== Biography ==
Fernando received his early education at St. Anne's College in Kurunegala, where his father was the Municipal Commissioner. Later, he attended St. Benedict's College, Colombo, where he captained the cricket team in 1959. In a match against the team from St. Anne's College, he dismissed the opposition for 50, taking all 10 wickets for 24 runs, including a hat-trick, then scored a double-century in 157 minutes, all in one day's play. The feat of taking all 10 wickets and scoring a double-century in the same match is believed to be unique in world cricket.

His bowling fell away, but he represented Ceylon in the 1960s as a batsman and slip fielder. He made his first-class debut for a Ceylon Board President's XI when they defeated a Pakistan team in 1964–65. In 1965–66, he top-scored with 40 in a one-day match for Ceylon against the touring MCC. In 1966–67, he toured Pakistan with the Ceylon team, playing in one of the unofficial Tests, and a few weeks later, against the touring West Indians, he scored 48 and 72 not out.

In the 1970s, Fernando played league cricket in England: two seasons with Fieldhouse in the South Lancashire League and one season for Walsden in the Central Lancashire League.

Fernando migrated to Australia in 1984 and played several seasons of club cricket for Jacana in Melbourne. He and his wife Stella lived in Melbourne. They had two sons, Tyrone and Dilshan, and a daughter, Marina. In September 2018, he was one of 49 former Sri Lankan cricketers felicitated by Sri Lanka Cricket, to honour them for their services before Sri Lanka became a full member of the International Cricket Council (ICC). Fernando died in Melbourne on 31 March 2026, at the age of 86.
