= Nipun Ransika =

Sri Lankan cricketer (born 1999)

Personal information
- Born: 2 June 1999 (age 27); Galle, Sri Lanka
- Source: Cricinfo, 22 August 2018

Nipun Ransika (born 2 June 1999) is a Sri Lankan cricketer. In August 2018, he was named in Kandy's squad for the 2018 SLC T20 League. He made his Twenty20 debut for Kandy in the 2018 SLC T20 League tournament on 22 August 2018. Prior to his T20 debut, he was named the Sri Lankan Schoolboy Cricketer of the Year for 2017. He made his first-class debut for Colts Cricket Club in the 2018–19 Premier League Tournament on 7 February 2019. He made his List A debut for Colts Cricket Club in the 2018–19 Premier Limited Overs Tournament on 4 March 2019.

In April 2022, Sri Lanka Cricket (SLC) named him in the Sri Lanka Emerging Team's squad for their tour to England.
