= Muttaiah Devaraj =

Personal information
- Full name: C. T. Muttaiah Devaraj
- Born: 16 August 1938 (age 88); Batticaloa, Ceylon
- Batting: Right-handed

Career statistics
Competition	First-class
Matches	7
Runs scored	279
Batting average	21.46
100s/50s	0/2
Top score	85
Balls bowled	114
Wickets	0
Bowling average	–
5 wickets in innings	–
10 wickets in match	–
Best bowling	–
Catches/stumpings	6/–
- Source: Cricinfo, 14 April 2017

Muttaiah Devaraj (born 16 August 1938) is a former cricketer who played seven matches of first-class cricket for Ceylon between 1964 and 1967. He later became a match referee.

Devaraj attended Zahira College, Colombo, where he captained the cricket team in 1958. A middle-order batsman, he toured India with the Ceylon team in 1964-65, playing in five first-class matches but not in any of the matches against India. In the match against Madras he made his highest first-class score of 85, which was also Ceylon's highest score in the match.

He later became a coach, an administrator and a match referee. He served as a match referee in Sri Lankan domestic cricket from 2002 to 2011. He has twice been formally honoured by Sri Lanka Cricket for his services to cricket in Sri Lanka: in 2000 and in 2014, when the honour included an award of 300,000 rupees.

In September 2018, he was one of 49 former Sri Lankan cricketers felicitated by Sri Lanka Cricket, to honour them for their services before Sri Lanka became a full member of the International Cricket Council (ICC).
