= B. W. R. Thomas =

Sri Lankan cricketer

Personal information
- Full name: Bertram W. R. Thomas
- Bowling: Right-arm leg-spin

Career statistics
Competition	First-class
Matches	3
Runs scored	13
Batting average	13.00
100s/50s	0/0
Top score	9 not out
Balls bowled	546
Wickets	10
Bowling average	33.90
5 wickets in innings	0
10 wickets in match	0
Best bowling	4/71
Catches/stumpings	1/0
- Source: Cricket Archive, 23 February 2017

Bertram W. R. Thomas is a former cricketer who played for Ceylon in the 1960s.

== Cricket career ==
Thomas was a leg-spinner. He attended S. Thomas' College, Mount Lavinia, in the late 1950s and early 1960s, playing in the cricket team.

Thomas was selected to tour Pakistan with the Ceylon team in 1966–67. He played in the two preliminary first-class matches before the three-match unofficial Test series. In the first match, against a President's XI in Rawalpindi, he made his first-class debut, and took 4 for 71 in the second innings. In the second match, against a Punjab Governor's XI in Lyallpur, he took 3 for 30 in the second innings.

At this stage of Ceylon's tour, Thomas had seven wickets at an average of 24.71 and was the team's highest wicket-taker. However, he was not selected for the first match against Pakistan, which Ceylon lost by 10 wickets. He played in the second match in Dacca. Pakistan batted first, and Thomas took the first three wickets to fall, the only wickets on the first day, and finished with 3 for 166 in Pakistan's total of 517 for 7 declared; no one else took more than one wicket. Pakistan won by an innings. Despite this success he was omitted from the team for the final match of the series, and that was the extent of his first-class career.

In September 2018, Thomas was one of 49 former Sri Lankan cricketers felicitated by Sri Lanka Cricket, to honour them for their services before Sri Lanka became a full member of the International Cricket Council (ICC).
