= Gethsie Shanmugam =

Teacher and couseller

- Born: 1934 (age 91–92); Nawalapitiya, Sri Lanka
- Occupations: Teacher and counseller
- Spouse: Muthuvelu Shanmugam
- Awards: Ramon Magsaysay Awards (2017)

Gethsie Shanmugam (Tamil: கெத்சி சண்முகம், Sinhala: ගෙත්සි ෂන්මුගම්) is a Sri Lankan teacher, psychological counsellor and social worker who had given her service to victims of the Sri Lankan civil war. She was awarded the prestigious Ramon Magsaysay Award in 2017 for braving bombings and threats of arrests in conflict areas to counsel war widows, orphans and children affected by the civil war.

Born in 1934 to a clerk in a British tea estate, Shanmugam had her education at Mowbray private girls’ boarding school. After the O/L examination she became a teacher and followed a course at Nallur training college where she met her husband, Muthuvelu Shanmugam. In 1967, she started her career as an English teacher at St. Joseph's College, Colombo and meanwhile she pursued an interest in psychology and became a volunteer counselor at the Family Services Institute and Subodhi Institute of Integrated Education in Piliyandala. After retiring from St. Joseph's college in 1983, Shanmugam conducted number of psycho social works for adults and children who are internally displaced in conflict zones during the civil war.
