= Richard Heyn =

Sri Lankan cricketer and field hockey player

Richard Russell Heyn (24 September 1942 – 3 April 2024) was a former field hockey player who represented Sri Lanka men's national field hockey team playing as a right full back. His younger brother David Heyn played cricket for Sri Lanka and at club level representing Burgher Recreation Club. His father Bertram Heyn was a former Sri Lankan Army general who also holds a special feat of having dismissed legendary Australian cricketer Don Bradman in a first-class match in Sri Lankan soil.

== Career ==
He plied his trade in cricket and field hockey at his younger age. He went onto captain St. Peter's College cricket and field hockey teams. During his playing career as a cricketer, he was an automatic choice for Burgher Recreation Club during the 1960s. He also played a vital part in Burgher Recreation Club's triumph at the 1967 Domestic season as he pioneered the club leading from the front as a standout captain.

He represented the Mercantile Hockey Association at the National Championships from 1965 to 1967. He was also a key member of the Sri Lankan hockey team as part of the Sri Lankan contingent which took part at the 1966 Asian Games. He was named in Sri Lanka field hockey squad for a three match test series against a strong Indian side in 1967. During the first test of the three test series, Sri Lanka lost by a margin of 1-0 which is still regarded as the best ever performance by Ceylonese hockey side against India.

Following his retirement from sporting career, he pursued his career in commercial sector until 1968. He then migrated to Australia and began fulfilling his career ambitions by taking up key managerial positions. He later moved to the United States and was living in Virginia until his death.

== Death ==
He died on 3 April 2024 in Virginia, United States, at the age of 81 due to age-related ailments.
