= Fitzroy Crozier =

Ceylon cricketer (born 1936)

Personal information
- Full name: Fitzroy Bertram Crozier
- Born: 28 November 1936 (age 89); Colombo, Ceylon
- Bowling: Slow left-arm orthodox
- Role: All-rounder

Career statistics
Competition	First-class
Matches	8
Runs scored	334
Batting average	23.85
100s/50s	0/2
Top score	60
Balls bowled	1818
Wickets	26
Bowling average	29.07
5 wickets in innings	3
10 wickets in match	0
Best bowling	7/133
Catches/stumpings	5/0
- Source: Cricinfo, 2 October 2014

Fitzroy Bertram Crozier (born 28 November 1936) is a former cricketer who played first-class cricket for Ceylon between 1957 and 1967.

Born in Colombo, Crozier attended Royal College and captained the First XI in his final year, 1956. A slow left-arm orthodox spin bowler, he played for Ceylon in the Gopalan Trophy match in 1956–57, but did not play again until he was a surprise selection in the Ceylon side that toured Pakistan in 1966–67.

Pakistan won all three matches between the two teams by wide margins, losing only 27 wickets in the process. Crozier took 14 of those wickets for 372, at an average of 26.57. He took 6 for 135 off 64 overs in Pakistan's first innings in the first match, and 7 for 133 in Pakistan's only innings in the third match. He also top-scored with 57 as an opening batsman in the second innings of the second match.

Crozier later went to live in Australia. In September 2018, he was one of 49 former Sri Lankan cricketers felicitated by Sri Lanka Cricket, to honour them for their services before Sri Lanka became a full member of the International Cricket Council (ICC).
