= John Arenhold =

South African cricketer (1931–2017)

Personal information
- Full name: John Adolf Arenhold
- Born: 9 May 1931; Plumstead, Cape Town, South Africa
- Died: 30 September 2017 (aged 86); Muizenberg, Cape Town, South Africa
- Batting: Right-handed
- Bowling: Right-arm fast-medium

Domestic team information
- Years: Team
- 1953 to 1955: Oxford University
- 1956–57: Ceylon
- 1959–60: Orange Free State

Career statistics
Competition	First-class
Matches	33
Runs scored	403
Batting average	10.07
100s/50s	0/0
Top score	45
Balls bowled	4619
Wickets	82
Bowling average	27.14
5 wickets in innings	4
10 wickets in match	1
Best bowling	7/97
Catches/stumpings	14/–
- Source: Cricinfo, 22 July 2014

John Adolf Arenhold (9 May 1931 – 30 September 2017) was a South African cricketer who played first-class cricket from 1953 to 1960.

Arenhold went to school at Diocesan College, Cape Town, before attending University College, Oxford. He played as an opening bowler for Oxford University from 1953 to 1955, gaining his Blue in 1954. His best bowling figures for Oxford were 6 for 37 against Middlesex in 1954. When his form fell away in 1955 he was left out of the side, only to take his best first-class figures, 7 for 97, against Oxford for D.R. Jardine's XI.

After graduating from Oxford, Arenhold lived in Ceylon from 1956 to 1958, working for Shell as a management trainee. He played cricket for Colombo Cricket Club and Rugby union for Dimbulla Athletic and Cricket Club, and represented Ceylon at both sports. Playing for Ceylon in the Gopalan Trophy against Madras in 1956–57 he took 6 for 17 and 5 for 26 to help Ceylon to a five-wicket victory at Colombo Oval. His match figures of 11 for 43 are a record for Sri Lanka in Gopalan Trophy matches.

Returning to South Africa, Arenhold played a season for Orange Free State in the 1959–60 Currie Cup, opening the bowling with Sydney Burke and taking 16 wickets at an average of 20.56 in five matches. He retired from first-class cricket after the season.

Arenhold had a successful business career in South Africa. He was the regional marketing manager for Nissan when they were major sponsors of South African cricket in the 1980s.
