= Lasantha Rodrigo =

Personal information
- Full name: Lasantha Naomal Genoris Rodrigo
- Born: 28 May 1938 (age 88); Moratuwa, Ceylon
- Batting: Right-handed
- Bowling: Right-arm off-spin

Career statistics
Competition	First-class
Matches	14
Runs scored	455
Batting average	16.85
100s/50s	0/2
Top score	89
Balls bowled
Wickets	–
Bowling average	–
5 wickets in innings	–
10 wickets in match	–
Best bowling	–
Catches/stumpings	3/–
- Source: Cricinfo, 14 April 2017

Lasantha Rodrigo (born 28 May 1938) is a former cricketer who played 14 matches of first-class cricket for Ceylon between 1959 and 1971.

== Life and career ==
Lasantha Rodrigo was born in Moratuwa and attended Prince of Wales' College, Moratuwa, where he captained the cricket team in 1958 and 1959, and also captained the Ceylon schools team. His father, J. B. C. Rodrigo, was principal of Prince of Wales' College from 1933 to 1959.

He made his highest first-class score on his debut, in the Gopalan Trophy match in 1958–59, when he scored 89. Batting at number three, he top-scored with 44 for Ceylon in their one-day match against the touring Australians in April 1961. He toured India with the Ceylon team in 1964-65, playing in all three matches against India, but with only moderate success.

He worked for Ceylon Cold Stores for 31 years as a mechanical engineer. Inability to take time off work to play cricket shortened his cricket career. In 2014 he was formally honoured by Sri Lanka Cricket for his services to cricket in Sri Lanka, and awarded 300,000 rupees. In September 2018, he was one of 49 former Sri Lankan cricketers felicitated by Sri Lanka Cricket, to honour them for their services before Sri Lanka became a full member of the International Cricket Council (ICC).

Rodrigo lives with his wife Sweenie in Moratuwa, opposite Prince of Wales' College. They have a daughter and a son.
