= Jayantha Silva =

Sri Lankan cricketer (born 1973)

Jayantha Silva ජයන්ත සිල්වා
Personal information
- Full name: Kelaniyage Jayantha Silva
- Born: February 6, 1973 (age 53); Kalutara
- Batting: Right-handed
- Bowling: Slow left-arm orthodox

International information
- National side: Sri Lanka (1995-1998)
- Test debut (cap 65): 26 December 1995 v Australia
- Last Test: 7 January 1998 v Zimbabwe
- Only ODI (cap 83): 26 March 1995 v New Zealand

Career statistics
Competition	Test	ODI
Matches	7	1
Runs scored	6	1
Batting average	2.00	–
100s/50s	0/0	0/0
Top score	6*	1*
Balls bowled	1,533	48
Wickets	20	0
Bowling average	32.35	–
5 wickets in innings	0	–
10 wickets in match	0	–
Best bowling	4/16	–
Catches/stumpings	1/–	0/–
- Source: Cricinfo, 9 February 2006

Kelaniyage Jayantha Silva (born February 6, 1973, Kalutara) is a former Sri Lankan cricketer who played in 7 Tests and one ODI from 1995 to 1998.
