= Rangala =

Rangala රංගල
- Village
- Location within Sri Lanka
- Country: Sri Lanka
- Province: Central Province
- District: Kandy District
- Elevation: 1,050 m (3,440 ft)
- Time zone: UTC+5:30 (Sri Lanka Standard Time)

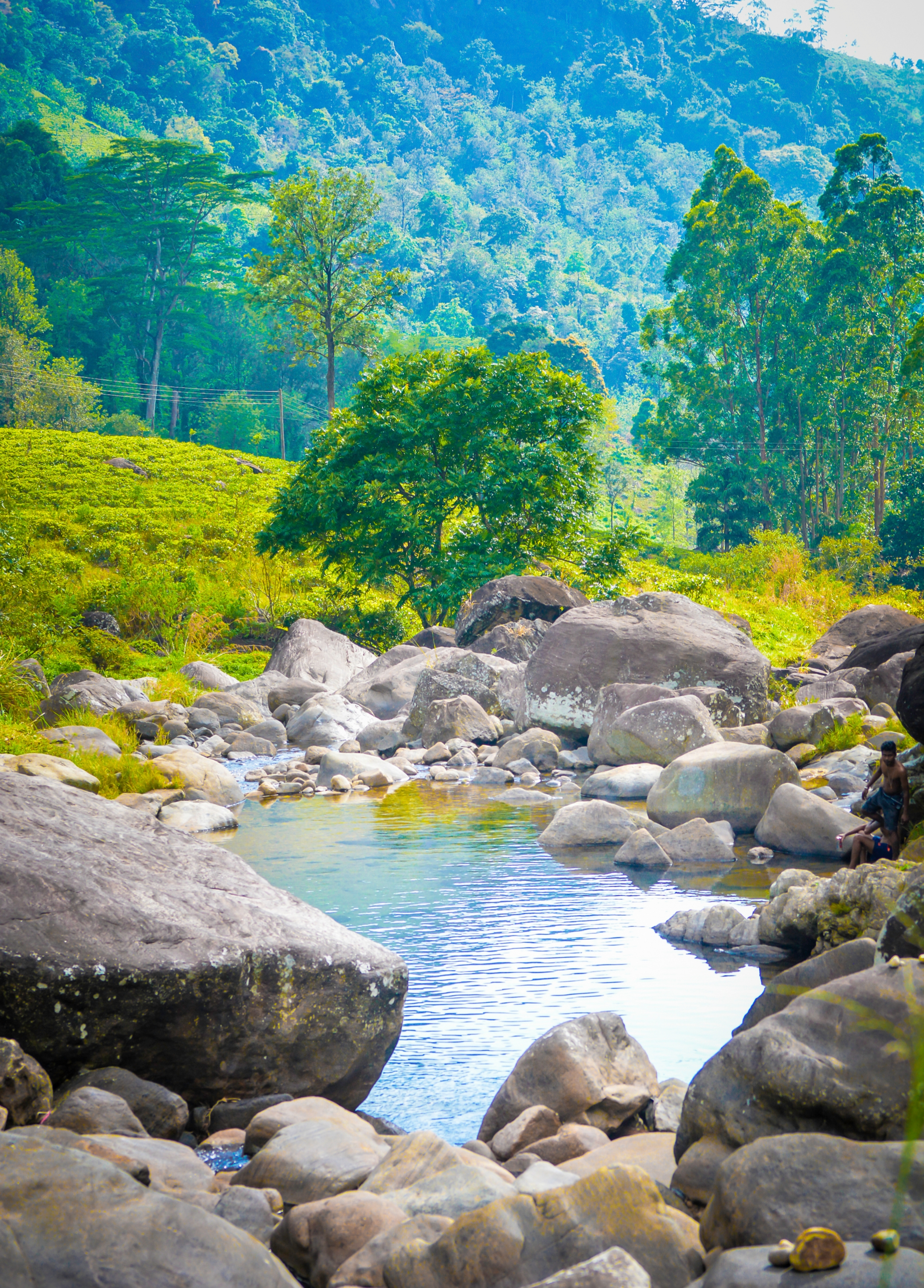
Rangala Natural Pool

Rangala (Sinhala: රංගල) is a small village located in Kandy District, Central Province, Sri Lanka. It is situated approximately 35 km (22 mi) northwest of Kandy in the Knuckles Conservation forest, near Kotta Ganga.

== See also ==
- List of towns in Central Province, Sri Lanka
