= Lareef Idroos =

Personal information
- Full name: Mohamed Lareef Idroos
- Born: 1940 (age 85–86); Ceylon
- Batting: Right-handed
- Bowling: Right-arm leg-spin

Career statistics
Competition	First-class
Matches	6
Runs scored	188
Batting average	17.09
100s/50s	0/0
Top score	45
Balls bowled	402
Wickets	5
Bowling average	58.00
5 wickets in innings	0
10 wickets in match	0
Best bowling	2/109
Catches/stumpings	2/0
- Source: Cricinfo, 15 April 2017

Lareef Idroos (born 1940), also known as Lariff Idroos, is a former cricketer who played six matches of first-class cricket for Ceylon between 1964 and 1970.

Idroos was a champion leg-spin bowler for S. Thomas' College, Mount Lavinia, captaining the team in 1960 and representing Ceylon schools. He toured India with the Ceylon team in 1964-65, but had little success in the first-class matches and did not play in any of the three matches against India.

He graduated in medicine from the University of Ceylon and moved to the United States, where he practised as a nephrologist in California. He also represented the United States at cricket, top-scoring with 60 in the match against Canada in 1979. He served as President of the Sri Lanka Medical Association of North America, West Coast, for some years.
