= Upali Kodituwakku =

Sri Lankan cricketer (born 1964)

Personal information
- Born: 10 July 1964 (age 62); Kandy, Sri Lanka
- Source: Cricinfo, 10 February 2016

Upali Kodituwakku (born 10 July 1964) is a Sri Lankan former first-class cricketer who played for Kandy Youth Cricket Club.
