= Sylvester Dias =

Sri Lankan cricketer (1937–2013)

Personal information
- Full name: Sylvester Allan Solaman Dias
- Born: 9 February 1937; Colombo, Sri Lanka
- Died: 1 December 2013 (aged 76)
- Batting: Right-handed
- Bowling: Right-arm medium-pace

Career statistics
Competition	First-class
Matches	5
Runs scored	59
Batting average	19.66
100s/50s	0/0
Top score	23
Balls bowled	557
Wickets	14
Bowling average	24.28
5 wickets in innings	0
10 wickets in match	0
Best bowling	3/30
Catches/stumpings	0/0
- Source: ESPNcricinfo, 31 October 2017

Sylvester Dias (9 February 1937 – 1 December 2013) was a Sri Lankan cricketer. He played first-class cricket for Ceylon between 1964 and 1968.
