= David Heyn =

Sri Lankan cricketer (born 1945)

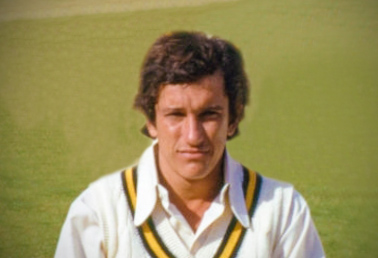
- Heyn in 1975

Personal information
- Full name: Peter David Heyn
- Born: 26 June 1945 (age 81); Colombo, Sri Lanka
- Batting: Left-handed
- Bowling: Right-arm medium

International information
- National side: Sri Lanka
- ODI debut (cap 3): 7 June 1975 v West Indies
- Last ODI: 14 June 1975 v Pakistan

Career statistics
Competition	ODI	First-class
Matches	2	50
Runs scored	3	2,625
Batting average	1.50	35.95
100s/50s	0/0	4/16
Top score	2	136
Balls bowled	–	1,283
Wickets	–	18
Bowling average	–	35.61
5 wickets in innings	–	0
10 wickets in match	–	0
Best bowling	–	4/52
Catches/stumpings	1/–	26/–
- Source: Cricinfo, 1 May 2016

Peter David Heyn (born 26 June 1945) is a former Sri Lankan cricketer who played in 18 unofficial Test matches from 1966 to 1976, and two One Day Internationals in the 1975 World Cup. Heyn is widely regarded as one of the best cover point fielders ever to represent Sri Lanka. In September 2018, he was one of 49 former Sri Lankan cricketers honoured by Sri Lanka Cricket for their services before Sri Lanka became a full member of the International Cricket Council (ICC).

== School cricket ==
Born to a cricketing family, his father Major General Bertram Heyn was also a cricketer for the All Ceylon team. Heyn began his cricket career at St Peter's College in Colombo, where he represented the school from 1961 to 1964, captaining in 1964. He also represented Colombo Schools against the Indian Schoolboys in that same year. His brother Richard Heyn also played cricket at club level representing Burgher Recreation Club

== Domestic career ==
He represented the Burgher Recreation Club whilst in school, and played there until the 1969/70 season. He then played for the Nondescripts Cricket Club from 1970/71 until 1975/76, captaining in the 1974/75 season.

His first-class debut was in 1964, playing 50 matches in total and compiling four hundreds (the highest being 136 against Indian Universities at Bangalore in December 1975). Note - at the time only Ceylon/Sri Lanka matches against foreign sides were classified as first-class.

As Sri Lanka were unlikely to attain full test status at the time, Heyn emigrated to England in 1976. Here he played for Richmond Cricket Club in the Middlesex County Cricket League until 1983, captaining in 1979 & 1980. In 1979 he set a batting record with 5 hundreds in the league season.

In 1981 he played 4 games for Berkshire in the Minor Counties Championship - unfortunately, further appearances were not possible due to work & family commitments.

In 1984 he retired completely from the game at the age of 39, having played a season for Lensbury Cricket club.
