= Norton Fredrick =

Sri Lankan cricketer (1937–2011)

Personal information
- Full name: Norton Fredrick
- Born: 14 November 1937; Wattala, Sri Lanka
- Died: 10 August 2011 (aged 73); Wattala, Sri Lanka
- Batting: Right-handed
- Bowling: Right arm fast-medium

Career statistics
Competition	First-class
Matches	13
Runs scored	196
Batting average	17.81
100s/50s	–/1
Top score	54
Balls bowled	1,946
Wickets	41
Bowling average	25.00
5 wickets in innings	–
10 wickets in match	–
Best bowling	4/43
Catches/stumpings	3
- Source: Cricinfo, 12 August 2011

Norton Fredrick (14 November 1937, Wattala – 10 August 2011, Wattala) was a Sri Lankan cricketer. He was primarily a fast bowler who represented Ceylon from 1964 until 1968 before retiring due to family commitments.

On his first-class debut in the Gopalan Trophy in March 1964, he took a hat trick. When Ceylon defeated India in Ahmedabad in January 1965, he took seven wickets in the match, all of top-order batsmen.

He had two sons, one of whom died while serving as an Army officer during the Sri Lankan Civil War.

== Death ==
Fredrick died, aged 73, on 10 August 2011, in his native Wattala, a suburb of Colombo. A road near his home is named after him.
