= St. Joseph's College, Colombo =

St. Joseph's College
- School Facade

Location
- T. B. Jayah Mawatha, Colombo 10; Sri Lanka; 6.924822°N 79.860405°E

Information
- Type: Semi Government
- Motto: Latin: In Scientia et Virtute (In Knowledge and Virtue)
- Religious affiliation: Christianity
- Denomination: Roman Catholic
- Established: 2 March 1896; 130 years ago
- Rector: Ranjith Andradi
- Staff: 450
- Grades: 1 – 13
- Gender: Male
- Age: 5 to 19
- Area: 6.1 ha (15 acres)
- Houses: Bonjean; Marque; Melizan; Courdet
- Colors: Blue and white
- Alumni: List of St. Joseph's College, Colombo alumni
- Alumni name: Old Boys Union of St. Joseph's College, Colombo
- Website: stjosephscollege.lk

St. Joseph's College is a selective-entry Roman Catholic boys' school in Colombo, Sri Lanka. Founded on 2 March 1896 by French missionaries led by Rev. Father Christophe Ernest Bonjean, it is regarded as one of the country’s most prominent educational institutions.

The college serves students from Grade 1 to Grade 13, with an enrollment of more than 4,000 and a staff of over 450 as of 2023. It operates as a private, partially state-funded institution, charging fees while receiving limited government support for teachers and resources, and also benefits from contributions from a global alumni network.

Notable former students include Mohamed Amin Didi, the first President of the Maldives; Ranasinghe Premadasa, the third President of Sri Lanka; Nirj Deva, Member of the Parliament of the United Kingdom; and Thomas Cooray, the first Catholic Cardinal from Sri Lanka.

== History ==
With the foundation stone laid in December 1894, by the Papal Delegate for Asia, St. Joseph's College, Colombo, was declared open on 2 March 1896. At the beginning the school had 211 students and 96 students in the preparatory school. Rev. Fr. Charles Collin, was appointed the first rector. The college building was formally declared open by Governor of Ceylon, West Ridgeway, and was blessed by Msgr. Zaleski, and the Archbishop Rt. Rev. Dr. Melizan.

The rector's office, the college office and the classrooms were all housed in the first building, the clock tower building. The college magazine was started in 1905. The Bonjean hall was the third building to be completed, by Rev. Fr. Charles Lytten, the second rector.

Rector, Rev. Fr. Emil Nicholas was the third rector appointed in 1912. One of Nicholas' achievements was the creation of the first religious association of the college, the Guild of the Immaculate Heart of Mary.

Four years later, in 1919, another educationist, scientist and administrator, Rev. Fr. Maurice J. Legoc OMI was appointed the fourth rector. Continuing the expansion to meet the growing demand for education, in 1933, the present primary building, originally named "The Maurice Block", became the newest addition. The next large expansion was the south wing, a two-storey building to house classrooms.

Being a scientist, Rev. Fr. Legoc in the 1930's could foresee the significance of science in education and its role in a changing world. He took leadership in placing great emphasis on incorporating science subjects into the curriculum. As a botanist, he published Tropical Botany, a text that was widely known in Ordinary Level classes, both in India and Sri Lanka. Fr. Legoc was also responsible and introduced a scheme of scholarships for the under privileged students, making a difference to the lives of the needy and that of the future generations. Fr. Legoc's vision was to widen the provision of education, continuing to make a difference to the lives of those we had to reach. The initiative saw the birth of,

(a) St. Joseph's College South, later St. Peter's College Colombo in 1922

(b) St. Joseph's College Negombo Branch

(c) St. Joseph's College Wattala Branch

(d) St. Paul's College, Waragoda (1935)

(e) St. John's College, Dematagoda (1939)

On the feast of St. Joseph, 19 March 1929, the foundation stone for the College Chapel was laid by the Archbishop of Colombo.

Rev. Fr. Peter Pillai OMI was the fifth Rector, from 1940 to 1961, the first Sri Lankan, a great scholar widely respected in Asia. The Grotto at St. Joseph's, a replica of the Grotto in Lourdes, France, was built in 1940. The College buildings were taken over by the Army during World War II, but the institution continued education with branches housed in Homagama, Kelaniya, Gampaha and later at Borella.

== Sports ==
Cricket has been played at the school since its founding. At that time it was the only Catholic school in a group of elite, mainly secular or Protestant Christian, private boys' schools which often played against one another. A number of alumni have played on the national team.

St. Joseph's oldest cricket rival is St. Anthony's College, Kandy. They compete for the Murali-Vaas Trophy, which was inaugurated in 2007 and named after St. Anthony's alumnus Muttiah Muralitharan and St. Joseph's alumnus Chaminda Vaas. In 2012 the two schools celebrated their historic 100th encounter. The most high-profile rivalry is against St. Peter's College, a brother school founded as its satellite campus and also known as the St. Joseph's College South. The annual match-up is known locally as the "Battle of the Saints" or "Joe–Pete".

== Rectors ==
Rectors of the College

Name	Period
Rev Fr Charles Collin	1896 – 1910
Rev Fr Charles Lytton	1910 – 1912
Rev Fr Emile Nicholas	1912 – 1919
Rev Fr Maurice Legoc	1919 – 1940
Rev Fr Peter A. Pillai	1940 – 1961
Rev Fr W. L. A. Don Peter	1961 – 1971
Rev Fr Mervyn Weerakkody	1971 – 1974
Rev Fr Quintus Fernando	1974 – 1979
Rev Fr Neville Emmanuel	1979 – 1983
Rev Fr Stanley Abeysekara	1983 – 1996
Rev Fr Victor Silva	1996 – 2005
Rev Fr Sylvester Ranasinghe	2005 - 2014
Rev Fr Travis Gabriel	2014 – 2019
Rev Fr Ranjith Andradi	2019–Present

== Notable Teachers ==
- Gethsie Shanmugam
