= St. Peter's College, Colombo =

St. Peter's College

- College Quadrangle

Location
- Colombo 4 Sri Lanka; 6.880597°N 79.860470°E

Information
- Type: Semi Government
- Motto: Latin: Virtus Et Veritas (Virtue and Truth)
- Religious affiliation: Roman Catholic
- Established: 18 January 1922; 104 years ago
- Founder: M. J. Le Goc
- Rector: Rohitha Rodrigo
- Staff: 270
- Grades: 1 - 13
- Gender: Boys
- Age: 5 to 19
- Enrollment: 4200
- Colours: Blue, silver and gold
- Website: stpeterscollege.lk

St. Peter's College (Sinhala: සාන්ත පීතර විදුහල, Tamil: செயிண்ட் பீட்டர் கல்லூரி) is a Roman Catholic boys-only primary to secondary (inclusive) school in the Bambalapitiya zone of Colombo, Sri Lanka, founded in 1922.

In 1919, just after the end of World War I, Fr. M. J. Le Goc, Rector of St Joseph's College, Colombo, wanted to start a college in the southern suburbs of Colombo and acquired a block of cinnamon land in Bambalapitiya.

Construction began on 7 July 1921 under the supervision of J. R. J. Jayesuria, an alumnus of St. Joseph's College. In December 1921, Le Goc announced that St. Joseph's College South would open in January 1922.

The buildings were designed by Le Goc and were built in six months. The quadrangle in front had an oval drive running around it. Le Goc also incorporated the concept of open-air classrooms.

The inauguration took place on Wednesday 18 January 1922. 204 students were admitted on that day and by the end of the year the number had risen to 268. The first rector was Fr. D. J. Nicholas Perera. As of 2019 the rector is Rev. Fr. Rohitha Rodrigo, and there were 6,088 students.

== St. Joseph’s College South ==
St. Joseph's College, Colombo was founded in March 1896. St. Joseph's College South, later St. Peter's College, was built on neglected cinnamon land bordering the Galle Road and alongside the Wellawatte Canal, starting on 7 July 1921.

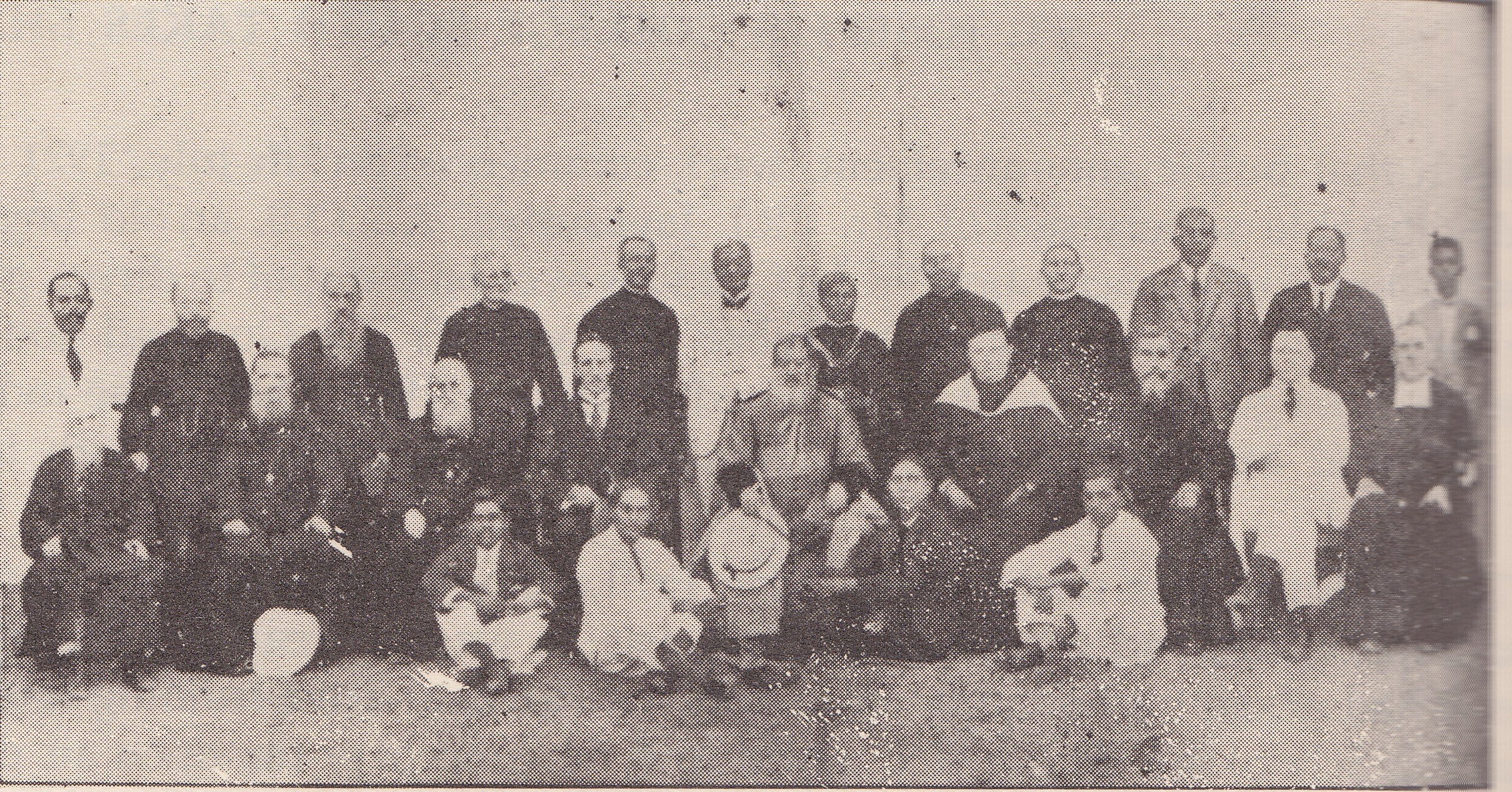
Opening of St. Peter's College

On 18 January 1922, Fr. Le Goc with a large number of Josephian students and Staff opened the new school.

Thus was St. Joseph's College South born on 18 January 1922. Rev. Fr. D. J. Nicholas Perera was appointed President of the college, with classes from Grade 1 to Grade 7, while the number on roll was 204.

== 1956 - 1977 ==
The period 1956 to 1977 covers the Rectorships of Five Rectors, all of whom were dogged by the problem of the schools takeover bid, with severe financial constraints consequent to the decision by St. Peter's not to be vested with the State but to function as a 'Non-Fee Levying Private School'. Nevertheless, and notwithstanding each of the five Rectors of this difficult era made their individual contribution to the progress of St. Peter's never succumbing to problems of the times.

Fr. Arthur Nicholas Fernando, who succeeded Fr. Basil Wiratunge as the Third Rector of St. Peter's from 1956 to 1963, developed Aesthetic Studies and started the first school's Fife and Drum band on 30 June 1956. A Cultural Centre to promote Music, Drama, Dancing and Art was started in November 1956 with the help of Fathers Mervyn Weerakkody and Marcelline Jayakody. Kandyan Dancing, Oriental Singing and the Western and Oriental Orchestras were set up. Rowing was introduced to St. Peter's in 1959, as also a unit of the St. John's Ambulance Brigade. On 1 December 1960, St. Peter's decided to remain as a private non-fee-paying institution. Arthur Nicholas Fernando set up the Welfare Society, a modern canteen, and college boarding.

Fr. Mervyn Weerakkody succeeded Arthur Nicholas Fernando and was the Fourth Rector from 1963 to 1971. He formed the Parent Teacher Association. Boards of Discipline, Studies and Sports were formed. He established the Employees Provident Fund for the Teaching Staff. On 24 July 1971, he left St. Peter's to take up the Rectorship of St. Joseph's.

Fr. Theodore E. Peiris O.M.I., who had been on the Tutorial Staff of St. Peter's in the 1940s, succeeded Weerakkody and was Rector from 1971 to 1975. He presided at the Golden Jubilee Celebrations of the college on 18 January 1972.

The Sixth Rector of St. Peter's, Fr. Claver Perera, was the first Peterite rector, from 1975 to 1976. He decentralised the administration with the appointment of Sectional Heads from Grade 6 to the Advanced Level. He enlarged and renovated the College Chapel for the first time in 50 years.

Fr. Francis Madiwela took over from Fr. Claver Perera, from 1976 to 1977. He arranged for the Old Boys to have their own president, from 4 December 1977. He transferred to St. Thomas, Kotte as Principal.

== From 1978 ==
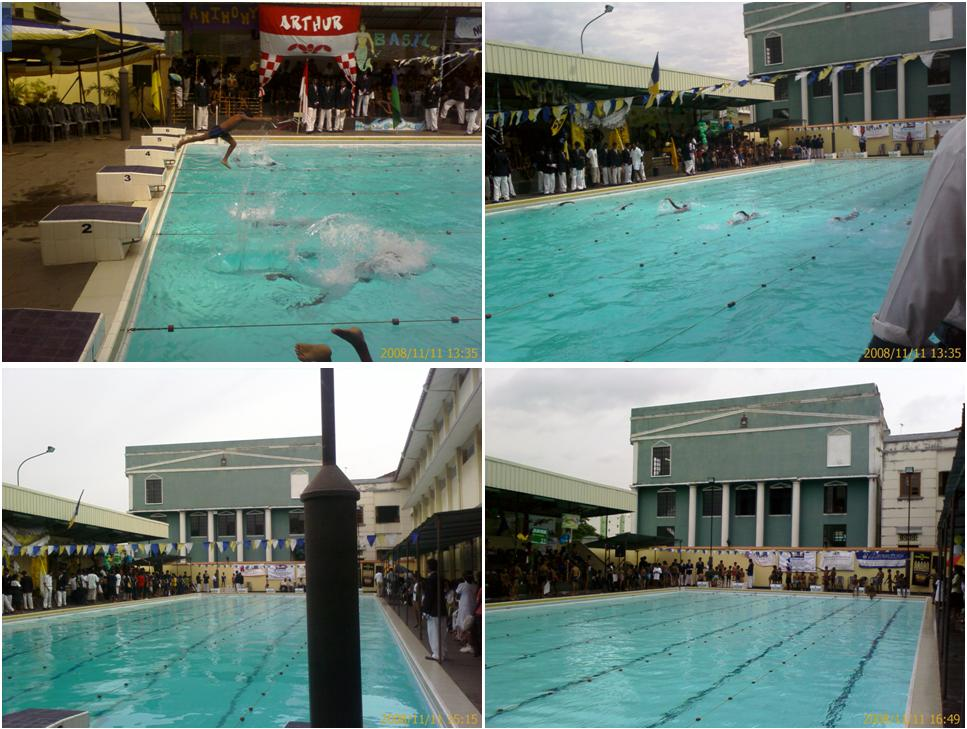
Swimming pool and sports complex

Fr Joe Wickramasinghe took over the Rectorship for 16 years from 1978. He built a vocational training centre with a computer lab, audiovisual studio, science laboratory building, a swimming pool complex, a new primary school building, a new dental clinic, a canteen and a mini zoo for the primary school. He set up scholarship funds to support students entering university and established a board of administration to assist in managing the school. The first branch school in Gampaha was opened.

=== St. Peter's College, Gampaha Branch ===
The branch, St. Peter's College, Gampaha, was inaugurated by Archbishop Oswald Gomis on 2 February 1993, as the first Branch school in Sri Lanka after the Schools Takeover Act No. 8, passed in 1961. As of 2013 it had more than 14 staff members.

=== St. Peter's College, Udugampola Branch ===
Oswald Gomis, the Archbishop of Colombo, initiated the opening of Branch Schools of the Catholic Colleges in Colombo and rural areas. St. Peter's College Branch School at Gampaha was the first of 10 branches opened as of 2013. The Udugampola Branch School was opened on 24 September 2005 by Archbishop Gomis, and Rev. Fr. Siri Cooray was appointed Principal of the Branch Schools of both Gampaha and Udugampola in January 2007. Fr. Suranga Fonseka became Assistant Priest to the school in January 2008.

New Chapel

A new Chapel at St. Peter's College Branch, Udugampola was blessed and dedicated by Archbishop Gomis on 21 October on the occasion of the 4th Anniversary of the Branch School.

=== Old Boys' Union - Gampaha and Udugampola Branches ===
On 15 March 2009, all the Old Peterites of Gampaha and Udugampola gathered at the Udugampola Branch School college hall to form the 1st Branch OBU under the main OBU at St. Peter's College, Colombo 04. Under the Guidance of Rev. Siri Cooray (Principal - Udugampola and Gampaha), Bernard Fernando (Vice Principal), Thilak Rodrigo (Vice Principal), Mrs. Chandani Perera, Suranga Senevirathne - President of SPC OBU, and Lasantha Dissanayake - Vice President of SPC - OBU.

=== Houses ===
There are 4 houses in the Primary School and 6 houses in the Upper School.

Primary School Houses	Upper School Houses
Gregory; Julian; Marcellous; Paris	Anthony- Named after Most Rev. Dr. Anthony Coudert OMI, Archbishop of Colombo (1903–1928) and Founding Archbishop who rendered much to the initiation of St. Peter's College.; Arthur - Named after Rev. Fr. Arthur N. Fernando Mis. Ap., Third Rector of St. Peter's College. (Served 1955–1963). Was one of two houses introduced in 1982.; Basil - Named after Rev. Fr. Basil Weeratunge OMI, Second Rector of St. Peter's College (1943–1955). Was one of two houses introduced in 1982.; Nicholas - Named after Rev. Fr. D. J. Nicholas Perera OMI, President of St. Joseph's College- Colombo South (1922–1927) and First Rector of St. Peter's College (1927–1943); Maurice - Named after Rev. Fr. Maurice LeGoc OMI, Rector of St. Joseph's College, Colombo 10 (1921–1940), Founder of St.Joseph's College Colombo South (later renamed St. Peter's College) and Rector of St. Joseph's College Colombo South (18 January 1922 to 8 April 1927) after which it was renamed St. Peter's College.; Peter - Named after Most Rev. Dr. Peter Marque OMI, Archbishop of Colombo (1930–1937). Archbishop at the Initiation of the House System.

== Sports ==
=== Battle of the Saints ===
The Battle of the Saints is the annual cricket encounter between St. Peter's College, Colombo and St Joseph's College, Colombo commonly known as the college "Big Match". This consists of a three -day match and a limited-over encounter.

=== St. Peter’s Sports Centre ===
St. Peter's Sports Centre is an indoor sports complex that is built alongside the extended duplication road. This is a four-storey multipurpose sports complex consisting of four Badminton courts, a Basketball court and a concert hall which can accommodate roughly 1500 persons.

== Past Rectors of the College ==
Rev. Fr. Maurice J. Le Goc OMI	1922 - 1927
Rev. Fr. D. J. Nicholas Perera OMI	1927 - 1943
Rev. Fr. Basil A. Wiratunge OMI	1943 - 1955
Rev. Fr. Arthur Nicholas Fernando Mis. Ap.	1956 - 1963
Rev. Fr. Mervyn Weerakkody	1963 - 1971
(Rev. Fr. Basil Weeratunge OMI- Acting Rector)	March 1967 - August 1968
Rev. Fr. Theodore E. Peiris OMI	1971 - 1975
Rev. Fr. Claver Perera	1975 - 1976
Rev. Fr. Francis Madiwela	1976 - 1977
Rev. Fr. Joe E. Wickramasinghe	1978 - 1994
(Rev. Fr. Kingsley C. Jayamanne- Acting Rector )	July 1983 - August 1984
Rev. Fr. Felician Ranjith Perera	1994 - 2005
Rev. Fr. Travis Gabriel	2005 - 2014
Rev. Fr. Trevor Gerard Martin	2014 - 2019
Rev. Fr. Rohitha Rodrigo	2019–Present

== Notable Teachers ==
- Rev. Fr. Marcelline Jayakody OMI - Well-known Sri Lankan Catholic priest, musician, lyricist, author, journalist and patriot.
- Ediriweera Sarachchandra - A famous Sri Lankan playwright, novelist, poet, literary critic, essayist and social commentator.

== Old Boys' Union ==
A few months after the change of the name from St. Joseph's College South to St. Peter's College, the inaugural meeting of St. Peter's College Old Boys' Union took place on 15 October 1927, presided over by the Rector, Rev. Fr. Nicholas Perera. From 1927 to 1977, a period of 50 years, the college Rector was ex-officio the President of the Old Boys' Union. In 1977 Rev. Fr. Francis Madiwela mooted the idea of electing a President among members of the Old Boys' Union, with the Rector becoming the patron of the union. Accordingly, a 3-man Sub Committee comprising J. A. R. Felix, C.E. Maurice Perera and George Wijesinghe was appointed to draft a new constitution incorporating the new proposal. This new constitution was adopted on 4 December 1977, and J.A.R. Felix was elected as the first President of the Old Boys' Union.

=== Past Presidents ===
J. A. R. Felix	1977 – 1980
Shelly Wickramasinghe	1980 – 1983
V. P. A. Perera	1983 – 1984
Mano Chanmugam	1984 – 1987
Deshamanya Denis Perera	1987 – 1990
Ranjith Weeraratne	1990 – 1992
C. E. Maurice Perera	1992 – 1993
C. Abeygoonewardene	1993 – 1996
Ajith Nivard Cabraal	1996 – 1999
Gerry De Mel	1999 – 2002
Mano Chanmugam	2002 – 2003
Harin Gunawardena	2003 – 2006
Suranga Seneviratne	2006 – 2009
Roshan Dharmaratne	2009 – 2011
Nielhaan Samaranayake	2011 – 2013
N. E. L. W. Jayasekera	2013 – 2014
Romeish de Mel	2014 – 2017
Asela Lihinikaduwa	2017 – 2020
Ravika de Silva	2020 – present
