= M. J. Gopalan Trophy =

Annual first-class cricket competition

The M. J. Gopalan Trophy was an annual first-class cricket competition played between Ceylon (now Sri Lanka) and Madras (now Tamil Nadu) between 1952–53 and 2007–08.

== History ==
The idea of the competition came about with the starting of a silver jubilee fund in 1952 to celebrate M.J. Gopalan's 25 years as a cricket and hockey player. Through the fund, an annual cricket match was instituted between Madras and Ceylon and named after Gopalan. The trophy was donated by the Madras cricket administrator V. Pattabhiraman and was presented to the victors after the first match by Learie Constantine.

Ceylon won the first match. The match became a regular fixture in the calendar until Sri Lanka received Test status and the competition was stopped. It was revived in 2000 with a match between Tamil Nadu and a Colombo District Cricket Association. Two years later the fixture was dropped again but in 2007 the Sri Lankan and Tamil Nadu boards agreed to restart the competition. A match was played in September 2007 between Tamil Nadu and a Sri Lankan XI, won by the Sri Lankan team. No matches for the trophy have been played since.

== Results ==
There have been 27 first-class matches for the Gopalan Trophy. The names of the competing sides have varied, especially the Sri Lankan teams.

Season	Venue	Result
1952-53	Chepauk Stadium, Madras	Ceylon by 95 runs
1953-54	Nondescripts Cricket Club Ground, Colombo	Ceylon Cricket Association by an innings and 108 runs
1955-56	Nehru Stadium, Madras	Ceylon by an innings and 14 runs
1956-57	P. Saravanamuttu Stadium, Colombo	Ceylon Cricket Association by 5 wickets
1957-58	Chepauk Stadium, Madras	Madras by 2 wickets
1958-59	P. Saravanamuttu Stadium, Colombo	Drawn
1959-60	Nehru Stadium, Madras	Madras by 8 wickets
1960-61	P. Saravanamuttu Stadium, Colombo	Ceylon Cricket Association by 169 runs
1961-62	Nehru Stadium, Madras	Ceylon by an innings and 66 runs
1963-64	P. Saravanamuttu Stadium, Colombo	Ceylon Board President's XI by 6 wickets
1965-66	P. Saravanamuttu Stadium, Colombo	Drawn
1966-67	Chepauk Stadium, Madras	Drawn
1967-68	P. Saravanamuttu Stadium, Colombo	Ceylon Board President's Under-27s XI by 105 runs
1968-69	Chepauk Stadium, Madras	Drawn
1969-70	P. Saravanamuttu Stadium, Colombo	Drawn
1970-71	Chepauk Stadium, Madras	Drawn
1971-72	Sinhalese Sports Club Ground, Colombo	Tamil Nadu by an innings and 9 runs
1972-73	Chepauk Stadium, Madras	Tamil Nadu by 3 runs
1973-74	P. Saravanamuttu Stadium, Colombo	Drawn
1974-75	Mahatma Gandhi Stadium, Salem	Tamil Nadu by an innings and 73 runs
1975-76	Colombo Cricket Club Ground, Colombo	Sri Lanka Board President's XI by 22 runs
1976-77	Chepauk Stadium, Madras	Drawn
1980-81	Mahatma Gandhi Stadium, Salem	Drawn
1982-83	P. Saravanamuttu Stadium, Colombo	Drawn
2000-01	Sinhalese Sports Club Ground, Colombo	Drawn
2001-02	Chepauk Stadium, Madras	Drawn
2007-08	Colts Cricket Club Ground, Colombo	Sri Lanka Cricket XI by an innings and 96 runs

Ceylon/Sri Lanka have won 10 times, Madras/Tamil Nadu 5 times, and 12 matches have been drawn.

== Individual records ==
The highest score for Ceylon/Sri Lanka is 212 by Ievers Gunasekera in 1958–59, and the highest for Madras/Tamil Nadu is 179 by Michael Dalvi in 1974–75. The best innings figures for Ceylon/Sri Lanka are 8 for 43 by Lalith Kaluperuma in 1975–76, and the best for Madras/Tamil Nadu are 8 for 60 by V.V. Kumar in 1957–58. The best match figures for Ceylon/Sri Lanka are 11 for 43 (6 for 17 and 5 for 26) by John Arenhold in 1956–57, and the best for Madras/Tamil Nadu are 12 for 108 (4 for 48 and 8 for 60) by V.V. Kumar in 1957–58.

Dalvi of Tamil Nadu, and A. C. M. Lafir and Duleep Mendis of Sri Lanka, have scored two centuries. Srinivasaraghavan Venkataraghavan of Tamil Nadu has taken 10 or more wickets in a match four times.
