= Pakistani cricket team in Sri Lanka in 1985–86 =

International cricket tour

	Sri Lanka	Pakistan
- Dates: 23 February – 27 March
Captains	Duleep Mendis	Imran Khan

Test series
- Result: 3-match series drawn 1–1
Most runs	Arjuna Ranatunga (316)	Ramiz Raja (178)
Most wickets	Ravi Ratnayeke (11)	Imran Khan (15)

One Day International series
- Results: Pakistan won the 5-match series 2–0
Most runs	Keerthi Ranasinghe (55)	Mohsin Khan (105)
Most wickets	Champaka Ramanayake (3)	Abdul Qadir (5)

The Pakistani cricket team toured Sri Lanka from 23 February to 27 March 1986. The tour consisted of three Test matches and four One Day Internationals (ODIs). This was Pakistan's first Test series tour in Sri Lanka. The series ended 1–1 with 1 match drawn.

The tour was remembered for the acrimony between the two sides and poor umpiring throughout the Test series. The latter became the catalyst for Imran Khan to become an advocate for neutral umpires.

== Squads ==
Tests		ODIs	
Sri Lanka	Pakistan	Sri Lanka	Pakistan
Sidath Wettimuny; Amal Silva (wk); Aravinda de Silva; Roy Dias; Duleep Mendis (c); Arjuna Ranatunga; Ravi Ratnayeke; Ashantha de Mel; Rumesh Ratnayake; Asoka de Silva; Jayananda Warnaweera; Roshan Mahanama; Asanka Gurusinha; Guy de Alwis (wk); Don Anurasiri; Kosala Kuruppuarachchi; Kaushik Amalean	Mudassar Nazar; Mohsin Khan; Qasim Umar; Javed Miandad; Ramiz Raja; Saleem Malik; Imran Khan (c); Abdul Qadir; Zulqarnain (wk); Tauseef Ahmed; Wasim Akram; Mohsin Kamal; Zakir Khan	Ashley de Silva (wk); Keerthi Ranasinghe; Aravinda de Silva; Arjuna Ranatunga; Duleep Mendis (c); Roy Dias; Roshan Mahanama; Ashantha de Mel; Rumesh Ratnayake; Don Anurasiri; Gamini Perera; Brendon Kuruppu (wk); Champaka Ramanayake	Mudassar Nazar; Mohsin Khan; Javed Miandad (wk); Ramiz Raja; Saleem Malik; Imran Khan (c); Abdul Qadir; Tauseef Ahmed; Wasim Akram; Zakir Khan; Zulqarnain

== Test series ==
=== 1st Test ===
23 February 1986
Scorecard

Sri Lanka	v	Pakistan
109 (42.4 overs); Ashantha de Mel 23 (?); Imran Khan 3/20 (9 overs)		230 (90.2 overs); Mudassar Nazar 81 (239); Rumesh Ratnayake 3/57 (23 overs)
101 (43 overs); Arjuna Ranatunga 33 (?); Tauseef Ahmed 6/45 (15 overs)

Pakistan won by an innings and 20 runs
Asgiriya Stadium, Kandy
Umpires: Alane Felsinger (SL) & Selliah Ponnadurai (SL)
Player of the match: Tauseef Ahmed (Pak)

- Sri Lanka, who chose to bat
- 26 Feb was a rest day
- Zulqarnain (Pak) & Jayananda Warnaweera (SL) made their Test debuts
- With his first wicket of the match, Imran Khan reached 250 Test wickets.

=== 2nd Test ===
14 March 1986
Scorecard

Pakistan	v	Sri Lanka
132 (51.3 overs); Saleem Malik 42 (?); Kosala Kuruppuarachchi 5/44 (14.5 overs)		273 (95.3 overs); Arjuna Ranatunga 77 (175); Wasim Akram 4/55 (27.3 overs)
172 (45.3 overs); Qasim Umar 52 (50); Ravi Ratnayeke 5/37 (17 overs)		32/2 (13 overs); Asanka Gurusinha 9* (?); Imran Khan 2/18 (6 overs)

Sri Lanka won by 8 wickets
Colombo Cricket Club Ground, Colombo
Umpires: K. T. Francis (SL) & Camillus Perera (SL)
Player of the match: Arjuna Ranatunga (SL)

- Sri Lanka, who chose to field
- 17 Mar was a rest day
- Don Anurasiri, Kosala Kuruppuarachchi and Roshan Mahanama (SL) made their Test debuts
- At 74 runs, Ranatunga reached 1000 runs
- Mudassar took his 50th wicket in 57 Tests

The Sri Lankan second innings is the lowest Test match total to include all four types of extras (no-ball, leg bye, bye and wide).

=== 3rd Test ===
22 March 1986
Scorecard

Sri Lanka	v	Pakistan
281 (108.5 overs); Duleep Mendis 58 (?); Imran Khan 4/69 (32 overs)		318 (101.2 overs); Ramiz Raja 122 (242); Ravi Ratnayeke 4/116 (30 overs)
323/3 (108 overs); Arjuna Ranatunga 135* (208); Imran Khan 2/56 (25 overs)

Match drawn
Paikiasothy Saravanamuttu Stadium, Colombo
Umpires: Dooland Buultjens (SL) & Herbi Felsinger (SL)
Player of the match: Asanka Gurusinha (SL)

- Sri Lanka, who chose to bat
- 25 Mar was a rest day
- Zakir Khan (Pak); Kaushik Amalean (SL) made their Test debuts
- Gurusinha/Ranatunga: Highest Sri Lankan partnership for any wicket (240*)
- Substitute Sanath Kaluperuma

== ODI series ==
=== 1st ODI ===
2 March 1986
Scorecard

Sri Lanka; 124/6 (23 overs)	v	Pakistan; 125/2 (21.3 overs)
Keerthi Ranasinghe 41 (49); Abdul Qadir 3/23 (5 overs)		Mohsin Khan 59 (56); Rumesh Ratnayake 1/17 (4 overs)

Pakistan won by 8 wickets
Asgiriya Stadium, Kandy
Umpires: K. T. Francis (SL) & Selliah Ponnadurai (SL)
Player of the match: Mohsin Khan (Pak)

- Pakistan, who chose to field
- Don Anurasiri, Ashley de Silva, Roshan Mahanama, Gamini Perera and Keerthi Ranasinghe all (SL) made their ODI debuts
- 45-over match reduced to 23 overs

=== 2nd ODI ===
8 March 1986
Scorecard

Pakistan; 125/8 (38 overs)	v	Sri Lanka
Javed Miandad 30 (45); Champaka Ramanayake 3/25 (6 overs)

No result
Tyronne Fernando Stadium, Moratuwa
Umpires: Herbi Felsinger (SL) & K. T. Ponnambalam (SL)

- Sri Lanka, who chose to field
- Kaushik Amalean (SL) and Champaka Ramanayake (SL) made their ODI debuts
- 45-over match

=== 3rd ODI ===
9 March 1986
Scorecard

Sri Lanka	v	Pakistan

Match abandoned without a ball bowled
Khettarama Stadium, Colombo
Umpires: Unknown

- No toss
- Match abandoned due to rain
- 45-over match

=== 4th ODI ===
11 March 1986
Scorecard

Sri Lanka; 160/8 (38 overs)	v	Pakistan; 103/4 (23 overs)
Arjuna Ranatunga 74 (89); Wasim Akram 4/28 (9 overs)		Mudassar Nazar 35 (64); Kaushik Amalean 1/31 (7 overs)

Pakistan won by 8 wickets
Sinhalese Sports Club Ground, Colombo
Umpires: Herbi Felsinger (SL) & PW Vidanagamage (SL)
Player of the match: Arjuna Ranatunga (SL)

- Pakistan, who chose to field
- 45-over match made their ODI debuts
