= Ranatunga =

Ranatunga is a Sri Lankan surname, which may refer to:

- Arjuna Ranatunga, (born 1963), cricketer - batsman and captain
- General Cyril Ranatunga, Army officer
- Dammika Ranatunga, (born 1962), cricketer - batsman
- Nishantha Ranatunga, (born 1966), cricketer - all-rounder
- Prasanna Ranatunga, politician
- Reggie Ranatunga, Politician
- Ruwan Ranatunga, Politician
- Sanjeeva Ranatunga, (born 1969), cricketer - batsman
