= Arosa Sri Lanka cricket team in South Africa in 1982–83 =

International cricket tour

AROSA Sri Lanka in South Africa in 1982
| | South Africa | AROSA Sri Lanka |
- Dates: 26 October 1982 – 13 December 1982
| Captains | Peter Kirsten | Bandula Warnapura |

Test series
- Result: South Africa won the 2-match series 2–0

One Day International series
- Results: South Africa won the 4-match series 4–0

In October 1982, a representative team of Sri Lankan cricket players undertook a so-called "Rebel tour" to South Africa, to play a series of matches against the South African team colloquially called the 'cuckoo tour'. At the time, the International Cricket Council (ICC) had placed a moratorium on international cricket teams making tours of South Africa, due to the nation's government policy of apartheid, leaving South Africa with no international competition.

== Background ==
During the 1970s and 1980s, due to the boycott of South Africa by global sporting bodies, the International Cricket Council blocked any official cricket tours to South Africa. This led to a number of so-called "rebel" tours, where individual players were contracted to tour as part of unofficial representative teams. The first such tour took place shortly before the Sri Lankan "rebel tour" when an English team toured the country.

Heads of the South African Cricket Union, Ali Bacher and Geoff Dakin, approached Sri Lankan cricketer Tony Opatha in July 1982 to negotiate organising a tour by Sri Lankan players. In September Colin Rushmere, a South African lawyer, flew to Colombo with 14 contracts for the players of a team Opatha had assembled in secret. A month later the Sri Lankan team was touring Zimbabwe and Rushmere visited Harare to confirm the participation of Roy Dias and Duleep Mendis. However both were unable to join the tour team to South Africa as their passports were held by the team manager. When news of the tour broke, the Board of Cricket Control for Sri Lanka (BCCSL) issued 25-year bans to all the tour players. Opatha, who was team manager as well as a player, named the team the 'AROSA Sri Lankan XI'. The 'ARO' in the team name stood for the first three initials in his name, Antony Ralph Opatha, and the 'SA' standing for South Africa. On 17 October, the team (which included five, players who toured India with the Sri Lankan national side in September) travelled to Katunayake International Airport in groups of twos and threes without their cricketing gear in order to avoid attention. They boarded a plane to Hong Kong to transit to South Africa.

Sri Lanka were still an emerging team at the time, having only been granted Test status earlier in 1982, and were not regarded as being in the same league as the South Africans. The tour of a Sri Lankan team, the first ever by a non-white team, was a milestone which showed the world that South Africa (who previously blocked an English team touring in 1968 for containing just one non-white player) was reforming.

== The tour ==
The tour was a disaster for the AROSA Sri Lankan team, failing to win a single game. They were soundly beaten in all their one-day and "test" matches against the South Africans. Sri Lankan managed only to draw three matches against provincial teams, with the remainder also being defeats. The team was not helped by the absence of stronger performing players like Dias and Mendis and the underperformance of star spin bowler Ajit de Silva who struggled with stress and had a breakdown on tour.

First ODI

6 November 1982
(55 overs match)
Scorecard

| South Africa; 291/4 (55 overs) | v | Arosa Sri Lanka; 102 (50 overs) |
| Jimmy Cook 120; Anura Ranasinghe 2/46 (11 overs) | | Bernard Perera 30; Vintcent van der Bijl 2/9 (7 overs) |

South Africa won by 189 runs
Wanderers, Johannesburg
Umpires: James Peacock and Sydney Moore

- Toss not known

Second ODI

8 November 1982
(55 overs match)
Scorecard

| South Africa; 281/5 (55 overs) | v | Arosa Sri Lanka; 174/5 (55 overs) |
| Jimmy Cook 131; Anura Ranasinghe 2/54 (10 overs) | | Nirmal Hettiaratchi 50; Garth Le Roux 2/27 (11 overs) |

South Africa won by 107 runs
Berea Park, Pretoria
Umpires: Edward Carter and George Hawkins

- Toss not known

Third ODI

17 November 1982
(55 overs match)
Scorecard

| Arosa Sri Lanka; 140 (49.4 overs) | v | South Africa; 174/5 (55 overs) |
| Nirmal Hettiaratchi 32; Vintcent van der Bijl 4/12 (8.4 overs) | | Barry Richards 74; Jeryl Woutersz 1/9 (5 overs) |

South Africa won by 8 wickets
Kingsmead, Durban
Umpires: Denzil Bezuidenhout and Barry Smith

- Toss not known

First Test

19-22 November 1982
(4 day match)
Scorecard

| Arosa Sri Lanka | v | South Africa |
| 213 (72.3 overs); Bandula de Silva 70; Garth Le Roux 6/55 (18.3 overs) | | 378 (106.5 overs); Jimmy Cook 169; Lalith Kaluperuma 5/123 (45 overs) |
| 141 (62.1 overs); Flavian Aponso 44; Alan Kourie 5/44 (22 overs) |

South Africa won by an innings and 24 runs
Wanderers, Johannesburg
Umpires: Cyril Mitchley and Oswald Schoof

- Arosa Sri Lanka won the toss and decided to bat
- Bandula de Silva retired hurt in the Arosa Sri Lanka second innings having scored 3 (team score 8/1) - he returned when the score was 49/4

Fourth ODI

1 December 1982
(55 overs match)
Scorecard

| Arosa Sri Lanka; 276/9 (55 overs) | v | South Africa; 278/4 (52.5 overs) |
| Anura Ranasinghe 100; Garth Le Roux 2/57 (11 overs) | | Lawrence Seeff 142; Susantha Karunaratne 2/27 (8.5 overs) |

South Africa won by 6 wickets
St George's Park, Port Elizabeth
Umpires: Carl Coetzee and Sandy Matthews

- Toss not known

Second Test

9-13 December 1982
(4 day match)
Scorecard

| Arosa Sri Lanka | v | South Africa |
| 282 (90.5 overs); Flavian Aponso 81; Stephen Jefferies 3/43 (18 overs) | | 663/6d (159.3 overs); Graeme Pollock 197; Bernard Perera 2/154 (42.3 overs) |
| 281 (81.2 overs); Bernard Perera 102; Stephen Jefferies 3/76 (19 overs) |

South Africa won by an innings and 100 runs
Newlands, Cape Town
Umpires: Dudley Schoof and Barry Smith

- Toss not known

== Aftermath ==
The 14 players were given a 25-year ban, depriving Sri Lankan cricket of a large amount of player talent. Despite earning enough money from the tour to settle down and build houses, most faced social stigma and unemployment afterwards. In 1991 Sri Lankan president Ranasinghe Premadasa lifted the bans on the players allowing many of the rebels to later hold key positions in cricket administration. One player, Flavian Aponso, did play international cricket again at the 1996 Cricket World Cup for the Netherlands (where he had moved after the rebel tour). The Sri Lankan tour is theorised to have helped pave the way for subsequent rebel tours of players from the West Indies a few years later by demonstrating it possible for a non-white cricket team to tour South Africa safely.

After the ban was announced, Sri Lanka was planning their scheduled tour of New Zealand. The chairman of the New Zealand Cricket Council, Bob Vance, said New Zealand would have no influence, and would not wish to have any influence, over the selection of players to represent Sri Lanka in New Zealand.
