= List of Sri Lanka Test wicket-keepers =

This is a chronological list of Sri Lankan wicket-keepers, that is, Test cricketers who p kept wicket in a match for Sri Lanka. Figures do not include catches made when the player was a non wicket-keeper.

No.	Player	Span	Tests	Catches	Stumpings	Total
1	Mahes Goonatilleke	1982	5	10	3	13
2	Guy de Alwis	1983–1988	11	21	1	23
3	Amal Silva	1983–1988	9	33	1	34
4	Asanka Gurusinha	1985–1996	41	2	0	2
5	Brendon Kuruppu	1987–1991	4	1	0	1
6	Gamini Wickremasinghe	1989–1992	3	9	1	10
7	Hashan Tillakaratne	1989–1994	11	33	2	35
8	Romesh Kaluwitharana	1992–2004	49	93	26	119
9	Ashley de Silva	1993	3	4	1	5
10	Pubudu Dassanayake	1993–1994	11	19	5	24
11	Chamara Dunusinghe	1995	5	13	2	15
12	Lanka de Silva	1997	3	1	0	1
13	Prasanna Jayawardene	2000–2015	58	124	32	156
14	Kumar Sangakkara	2000–2008	48	124	20	144
15	Tillakaratne Dilshan	2009	3	11	0	11
16	Kaushal Silva	2011	3	5	1	6
17	Dinesh Chandimal	2011–2017	24	62	10	72
18	Niroshan Dickwella	2014–present	45	112	23	135
19	Kusal Perera	2015–2016	6	13	8	21

== See also ==
- List of Sri Lankan Test cricketers
- List of Sri Lankan ODI cricketers
