= Sri Lankan cricket team in Australia in 1989–90 =

International cricket tour

The Sri Lanka national cricket team toured Australia in the 1989-90 season and played 2 Test matches against Australia. Australia won the series 1-0 with one match drawn.

== Test series summary ==
=== First Test ===
8–12 December 1989
(5-day match)
Scorecard
Cricinfo Scorecard

Australia	v	Sri Lanka
367 (95.3 overs); TM Moody 106 (179); GF Labrooy 5/133 (31.1 overs)		418 (166.3 overs); PA de Silva 167 (361); TM Alderman 3/81 (40 overs)
375/6 (123 overs); MA Taylor 164 (334); AP Gurusinha 2/31 (10 overs)

Match drawn
Brisbane Cricket Ground, Woolloongabba, Brisbane
Umpires: AR Crafter and CD Timmins
Player of the match: PA de Silva (SL)

- Sri Lanka won the toss and elected to field.
- D Ranatunga and AGD Wickremasinghe (both SL) made their Test debuts.

=== Second Test ===
16–20 December 1989
(5-day match)
Scorecard
Cricinfo scorecard

Australia	v	Sri Lanka
224 (72.4 overs); PR Sleep 47* (125); RJ Ratnayake 6/66 (19.4 overs)		216 (83.4 overs); RS Mahanama 85 (229); PR Sleep 3/26 (10 overs)
513/5d (125 overs); SR Waugh 134* (177); PA de Silva 2/65 (18 overs)		348 (141.4 overs); JR Ratnayeke 75 (187); MG Hughes 5/88 (31.4 overs)

Australia won by 173 runs
Bellerive Oval, Hobart
Umpires: LJ King and SG Randell
Player of the match: PA de Silva (SL)

- Sri Lanka won the toss and elected to field.
- HP Tillakaratne (SL) made his Test debut.

== External sources ==
- CricketArchive
