= Reggie Ranatunga =

Sri Lankan politician (1937–2008)

Hon. Reggie Ranatunga

Member of Parliament for Gampaha District
- In office 21 February 2008 – 31 May 2008
- In office 1989–2004

3rd Governor of Sabaragamuwa
- In office June 2005 – February 2008
- Preceded by: C. N. Saliya Mathew
- Succeeded by: Dickson Sarathchandra Dela

Personal details
- Born: 22 April 1937 Sri Lanka
- Died: 31 May 2008 (aged 71)
- Party: Sri Lanka Freedom Party
- Children: Arjuna; Prasanna; Nishantha; Dammika; Sanjeeva; Ruwan

Reggie Padmasena Ranatunga (22 April 1937 – 31 May 2008) was a Sri Lankan politician belonging to the Sri Lanka Freedom Party. He was the third Governor of Sabaragamuwa, serving between June 2005 and February 2008.

Reggie Padmasena Rantunga was born on 22 April 1937 and was educated at Nalanda College, Minuwangoda and Ananda Sastralaya, Kotte. Ranatunga's interest in politics resulted in his enrollment at the Moscow Faculty of Political Science in 1960. In 1962 he joined the Sri Lanka Freedom Party and was appointed the SLFP Organizer for Minuwangoda in 1986.

At the 1989 parliamentary elections he was first elected to parliament representing Gampaha and was subsequently re-elected in 1994, 2000 and 2001. He served as the Minister for Civil Aviation (August – October 2000) and Minister of Food and Marketing Development (October 2000 – 2001) in the Kumaratunga cabinet, and the Chief Government Whip between 1 November 2000 and 10 October 2001.

He is the father of six sons, including former international cricketers, Arjuna, Sanjeeva, Dammika and Nishantha, along with Prasanna, and Ruwan.

On 21 February 2008 he was appointed as the MP for Gampaha replacing Sripathi Sooriyarachchi, who was killed in a car accident on 9 February, however Ranatunga died on 31 May 2008. His replacement Neil Rupasinghe was sworn in on 6 June 2008.

Political offices
Preceded by Saliya Mathew	Governor of Sabaragamuwa; 2005–2008	Succeeded by Dickson Sarathchandra Dela
