= English cricket team in Sri Lanka in 1981–82 =

International cricket tour

England in Sri Lanka in 1981–82
	England	Sri Lanka
- Dates: 17 February 1982 – 21 February 1982
Captains	Keith Fletcher	Bandula Warnapura

Test series
- Result: England won the 1-match series 1–0
Most runs	David Gower 131	Roy Dias 77
Most wickets	Derek Underwood 8	Ashantha de Mel 5

One Day International series
- Results: 2-match series drawn 1–1
Most runs	Graham Gooch 138	Sidath Wettimuny 132
Most wickets	Ian Botham 4	Ashantha de Mel 6

The England cricket team toured Sri Lanka in February 1982. The tour included two One Day International (ODI) matches and one Test match. Sri Lanka had become a Test playing nation the year before, and this was their inaugural Test match. Many celebrations had been prepared in Sri Lanka, include the issuing of commemorative stamps and coins.

England won the first ODI, but Sri Lanka won the second, causing large celebrations in the country. They also played well in the first Test match, but the Sri Lankan batting collapsed on the last day, resulting in a seven-wicket victory for England.

== Background ==
Sri Lanka had obtained Full Member status of the International Cricket Council (ICC) in 1981, making them the eighth Test playing nation. The Test match against England in February 1982 was to be their inaugural Test match. Therefore, the tour was met with much enthusiasm, and Sri Lanka had even issued commemorative stamps and coins to mark the event. Celebrations were organized, and even shops and businesses were planned to be closed on the day of the match. Several cricket grounds had been renovated and improved as well. When Sri Lanka won the second One Day International, the spectators rushed the pitch and lit bonfires in the stands, and celebrations went on into the night. However, attendance at the Test match was lower than expected, with about 10,000 spectators present at the start. This was presumed to be due to high ticket prices and television coverage. However, several dignitaries including President J. R. Jayewardene and some government ministers were present at the occasion.

After they arrived in the island after a tour of India, the English team had played a practice three-day match against the Sri Lanka Board President's XI on 9 February 1982. The match, which was played at the Asgiriya Stadium in Kandy, ended in a draw.

Sri Lanka celebrated the 25th anniversary of their first Test match in 2006.

== First ODI ==
13 February 1982
Scorecard

England; 211 (44.4 overs)	v	Sri Lanka; 206/8 (45 overs)
Graham Gooch 64 (107 balls); Ashantha de Mel 4/34 (8.4 overs)		Anura Ranasinghe 51 (41 balls); Bob Willis 2/32 (9 overs)

England won by 5 runs
Sinhalese Sports Club Ground, Colombo
Umpires: Basil Anthony and Herbi Felsinger
Player of the match: Ian Botham (ENG)

- Sri Lanka won the toss and elected to field.

Sri Lanka got off to a bad start with wicketkeeper Rohan Jayasekera dropped opening batsman Graham Gooch off the very first delivery from Ashantha de Mel. The English opening pair took their team's score to 55 before Geoff Cook was dismissed as their first wicket. When the next batsman, David Gower, was run out with England's total on 83, Ian Botham joined Gooch at the crease and put together a strong partnership. At one stage, these two batsmen scored 43 runs off 5 overs. Gooch was dropped two more times before he was dismissed for 64 with the total on 152, followed by Botham with their team total on 191. However, the English batting collapsed after this, and they were all out for 211 in the last over of the innings.

In the Sri Lankan innings, England got their first breakthrough when opening batsman and captain Bandula Warnapura was dismissed for 10 runs. However, Sidath Wettimuny along with Jayasekera took their team to 74. Sri Lanka were then in trouble when their third, fourth, and fifth wickets fell within 8 runs. Despite this, Ranjan Madugalle and Anura Ranasinghe put together a partnership of 68 runs, scoring at an average of 6 runs an over. Some strong hitting from the tail-end batsmen took Sri Lanka closer to their target, but they had managed only 206 for 8 wickets at the end of their innings, just 5 runs short of their target.

== Second ODI ==
14 February 1982
Scorecard

Sri Lanka; 215/7 (45 overs)	v	England; 212 (44.5 overs)
Sidath Wettimuny 86* (109 balls); Ian Botham 2/29 (9 overs)		Graham Gooch 74 (85 balls); Ashantha de Mel 2/14 (8.5 overs)

Sri Lanka won by 3 runs
Sinhalese Sports Club Ground, Colombo
Umpires: K. T. Francis and P. W. Vidanagamage
Player of the match: Sidath Wettimuny (SL)

- England won the toss and elected to field.

Almost 22,000 spectators had gathered to watch the second ODI match. Sri Lanka, having been put to bat, got off to another bad start when they lost their first two wickets for just 5 runs. However, Wettimuny batted well at the other end, and along with Roy Dias, took the team to 43 before Dias was dismissed. He was then joined by debutant Arjuna Ranatunga, who scored 42 and helped take the team to 130, before getting run out. The rest of the Sri Lankan batsmen did not get to big scores, and Sri Lanka was at 215 for 7 wickets by the end of the innings, with Wettimuny unbeaten on 86.

England started well, with the openers Gooch and Cook putting together a partnership of 109 runs before Cook was dismissed as England's first wicket. However, they lost their second and third wickets at 122, and despite a 38 run stand from Botham their scoring slowed down. England had to score 14 runs from the last two overs, with five of their wickets remaining. The English batsmen, in an attempt to score quickly, lost their sixth, seventh, eighth and ninth wickets in quick succession, all of them run out. With two balls remaining in the match, England's last batsman Bob Willis hit the ball high in the air, and was caught by Madugalle. The match ended in victory for Sri Lanka, with England just 3 runs short of their target.

The One Day series ended in a draw. Gooch was the top scorer for England with 138 runs in total, and Wettimuny for Sri Lanka with 132. They were the only batsmen to score more than 100 runs in the series. Botham took 4 wickets for 74 runs in the series, the most by an English bowler. De Mel was the most successful bowler for Sri Lanka, taking 6 wickets for 48 runs.

== Only Test ==
17–21 February 1982
Scorecard

Sri Lanka	v	England
218 (81.5 overs); Ranjan Madugalle 65 (246 balls); Derek Underwood 5/28 (18 overs)		223 (86.5 overs); David Gower 89 (256 balls); Ashantha de Mel 4/70 (17 overs)
175 (83.5 overs); Roy Dias 77 (161 balls); John Emburey 6/33 (25 overs)		171/3 (58.1 overs); Chris Tavare 85 (220 balls); Ajit de Silva 2/46 (17 overs)

England won by 7 wickets
Paikiasothy Saravanamuttu Stadium, Colombo
Umpires: Herbi Felsinger and K. T. Francis
Player of the match: John Emburey (ENG)

The Sri Lankan side was captained on their inaugural Test by Warnapura, who won the toss and elected to bat first. He opened the batting along with Wettimuny, and faced the first delivery from Willis. He also scored the first run for Sri Lanka, and according to a local newspaper, was the first to be hit on the chest. Warnapura then became the first batsman to lose his wicket, when he was caught by Gower off the bowling of Willis. Dias, Wettimuny and Duleep Mendis soon followed, leaving Sri Lanka in a difficult position at 34 runs for 4 wickets. However, a 99 run partnership between Madugalle and Ranatunga, with both batsmen scoring double centuries, took the Sri Lankan score to 183 before Ranatunga was dismissed. At the end of the day, Sri Lanka was at 138 for 8 wickets, with Madugalle remaining unbeaten on 64.

The last two wickets of the first Sri Lankan innings fell the next morning, and the English batsmen took to the crease. De Mel soon captured their first three wickets, leaving the English total at 44 for 3 wickets. However, Gower was dropped early in his innings, a mistake which would prove costly for the Sri Lankans. Gower and English captain Keith Fletcher took the team to 120 before the latter was dismissed. At the end of play for the day, England was at 186 for 5 wickets, with Gower and Bob Taylor at the crease.

The next day, 19 February, was a rest day. By the time Gower was dismissed for 89 runs the next day (20 February), England was at 200 runs for 6 wickets. However, the rest of the batsmen were dismissed for low scores and England ended up with 223 runs, having managed only 37 runs that day. In the Sri Lankan second innings, Warnapura and Dias built up a strong partnership despite having lost Wettimuny early. At the end of the third day, Sri Lanka had lost both of them, and were at 152 for 3 wickets, leading England by 147 runs.

Although the Sri Lankans were in a strong position at the start of the fourth day, but their batting soon collapsed when John Emburey took 5 wickets for just 5 runs. Only Warnapura, Dias and Mendis managed to score more than 20 runs, and none of the others got past 10. Sri Lanka ended up with 175 runs, leaving England a target of 171. De Mel struck early when he dismissed Cook without scoring, but Gooch and Chris Tavare took England to 84 before the former was dismissed. Tavare was then joined by Gower, and the pair took their team total to 167 before Tavare was stumped. However, the remaining runs were taken by Gower, and the match ended in victory for England.
