= Kaluperuma =

Kaluperuma is a surname. Notable people with the surname include:

- Lalith Kaluperuma (born 1949), Sri Lankan cricketer
- Sanath Kaluperuma (born 1961), Sri Lankan cricketer
