= Gamini =

Gamini may refer to

- Gamini Perera, Sri Lanka politician
- Gamini Fonseka, Sri Lankan film actor
- Gamini Dissanayake, Sri Lankan politician
- Gaja Gamini, Indian actor
- Gamini Wickremasinghe, Sri Lankan cricketer
- Gamini Lokuge, Sri Lankan politician
- Gamini Kularatne, Sri Lankan soldier
- Gamini Goonesena, Sri Lankan cricketer
- Gamini Silva, Sri Lankan cricketer
- Gamini Perera, Sri Lankan cricketer
- Gamini Haththotuwegama, Sri Lankan playwright, director and actor
- Gamini Jayasuriya, Sri Lankan politician
- Gamini Hettiarachchi, Sri Lankan actor
- Gamini Jayawickrama Perera, Sri Lankan politician
- R. M. Gamini Rathnayake, Sri Lankan politician
- Gamini Waleboda (born 1967), Sri Lankan politician
- G. L. Peiris full name (Gamini Lakshman Peiris), Sri Lankan politician
