= Labrooy =

Labrooy is a surname. Notable people with the surname include:

- Graeme Labrooy (born 1964), Sri Lankan cricketer
- Wendell Labrooy (born 1971), Sri Lankan cricketer
