= Felsinger =

Felsinger is a surname. Notable people with the surname include:

- Alane Felsinger (born 1937), Sri Lankan cricket umpire
- Donald E. Felsinger, American businessman
- Herbi Felsinger (1934–2018), Sri Lankan cricket umpire
- Norbert Felsinger (born 1939), Austrian figure skater

== See also ==
- Fellinger
