= Graeme Labrooy =

Sri Lankan cricketer

Personal information
- Full name: Graeme Fredrick Labrooy
- Born: 7 June 1964 (age 62); Colombo, Sri Lanka
- Height: 183 cm (6 ft 0 in)
- Batting: Right-handed
- Bowling: Right-arm fast-medium
- Role: Bowler
- Relatives: Wendell Labrooy (brother)

International information
- National side: Sri Lanka (1986-1992)
- Test debut (cap 132): 17 December 1986 v India
- Last Test: 1 March 1991 v New Zealand
- ODI debut (cap 50): 27 November 1986 v India
- Last ODI: 9 March 1992 v England

Career statistics
Competition	Test	ODI
Matches	9	44
Runs scored	158	249
Batting average	14.36	8.58
100s/50s	0/1	0/0
Top score	70*	33
Balls bowled	2158	2,308
Wickets	27	45
Bowling average	44.22	41.68
5 wickets in innings	1	1
10 wickets in match	0	0
Best bowling	5/133	5/57
Catches/stumpings	3/–	8/–
- Source: Cricinfo, 9 February 2006

Graeme Fredrick Labrooy (Sinhala: ග්‍රැහැම් ලැබ්‍රෝයි; born 7 June 1964) is a former Sri Lankan cricketer who played in nine Test matches and 44 One Day International from 1986 to 1992. He was the chairman of selectors for the national team and currently serves as an international match referee. His younger brother Wendell Labrooy is also a first-class cricketer and match referee. Labrooy holds the unique distinction of never playing any of his nine test matches at home. He had modelled his text book bowling action on Richard Hadlee and he was regarded as a huge fan of Hadlee.

== Playing career ==
He pursued his education at Maris Stella College in Negombo. He played school cricket for Maris Stella College and captained the Maris Stella College cricket team. In 1981, he was part of the Sri Lankan school cricket team which toured England. In 1983, he was voted as the Best Outstation Schoolboy Cricketer of the Year and was also voted as best school all-rounder and best school bowler in the same year. He initially pursued his career as a spinner when he was in his mid 13s to 15s but later decided to become a seamer in his school cricket days.

A right-hand bat and right-arm fast medium bowler, Labrooy took 124 first class wickets at 33.56, but struggled in the international arena with averages in the mid-40s. He made his ODI debut on 27 November 1986 along with Hashan Tillakaratne against India during the 1986–87 Champions Trophy. A month later, he made his test debut against India on 17 December 1986 and batted as a tailender on debut while also recorded expensive bowling figures of 1/164. Together with his moderate batting ability, he enjoyed occasional all round success. During an ODI against Australia at the 1989 Benson & Hedges World Series, he became the first player ever to be dismissed on the very second ball faced by a batsman in an ODI innings after hitting a six off the first ball. In the same match against Australia, Max Walker who was the commentator for Channel Nine made a stir regarding his name by comparing his name with fellow Sri Lankan cricketers names which were relatively longer than Labrooy. He also became the first player to be dismissed with a batting strike rate of 300 in an ODI match. He took his maiden test five-wicket haul against Australia at The Gabba in Brisbane in 1989.

In a test match against New Zealand in 1991 at Auckland, he took seven wickets and batting at number 9 position he smacked 70 from just 80 deliveries taking only 89 minutes out of which 60 off those runs came in boundaries (hammering 12 fours and 2 sixes). It also turned out to be his last test match appearance for Sri Lanka. Due to political tension in Sri Lanka, his nine Test matches were sporadic and all played abroad. During his short test career, he established new ball partnership with Rumesh Ratnayake. He was part of the Sri Lankan squad at the 1992 Cricket World Cup, his maiden and only World Cup tournament and also the tournament incidentally marked his last international appearance for Sri Lanka.

He played one domestic season for Negombo Cricket Club and then represented Basnahira North and Colombo Cricket Club in domestic cricket from 1983 to 1991. He retired from professional cricket in 1992 after featuring in one domestic season for Galle Cricket Club.

== Referee ==
After retirement, Labrooy became a board member of the Federation of International Cricketers' Associations, and served as an international referee. In 2010, he was appointed in the Asian regional match referee panel by the International Cricket Council. He had previously officiated as a match referee in Sri Lankan domestic cricket matches until 2009.

His first appearance at an ICC event as match referee came during the 2000 ICC Under-19 World Cup. He then went onto officiate as an international match referee at the 2012 ICC T20 World Cup, 2015 ICC World Twenty20 Qualifier, 2017 Women's Cricket World Cup, 2018 ICC Women's T20 World Cup, 2018 Under-19 Cricket World Cup and 2018 Cricket World Cup Qualifier. His first official T20I as match referee came during a match between Canada and Afghanistan at the 2012 ICC World Twenty20 Qualifier. His first ODI as match referee came during a match between Scotland and Afghanistan at the ICC World Cricket League Championship in 2013.

He had also served as match referee in the Indian Premier League in 2013, 2014 and 2015 seasons and also in the inaugural edition of the Abu Dhabi T10 League. He also served as a match referee in the inaugural edition of the Lanka Premier League in 2020.

In January 2020, he was named as one of the three match referees for the 2020 Under-19 Cricket World Cup tournament in South Africa.

== Selection committee ==
In 2005, he was appointed as the secretary of Sri Lanka Cricketers' Association (SLCA) and resigned from the position in 2011.

On 15 September 2017, Labrooy was appointed as the chief selector of the national team replacing Sanath Jayasuriya. He along with former selector, Asanka Gurusinha and three new persons included former national team manager Jeryl Woutersz, former Sri Lanka wicketkeeper Gamini Wickremasinghe, and former domestic Sri Lankan cricketer, Sajith Fernando were appointed in the selection committee. In 2018, he was appointed in a temporary seven member cricket advisory committee by the Sports ministry (with the intervention of the then sports minister Faizer Mustapha) which functioned until the Sri Lanka Cricket Elections. In June 2018, he was reappointed as the chief selector of national cricket team replacing Asanka Gurusinha. However, when he was reappointed as the chief selector of the team, concerns were raised over the conflict-of-interest whereas Labrooy was also serving as one of the match referees in the ICC elite panel. In November 2018, he was replaced by Ashantha de Mel as the chief selector.

== Business ==
Labrooy had also worked for Brandix apparel industry and also for Finlays Insurance brokers.
