= Sri Lankan cricket team in Pakistan in 1973–74 =

International cricket tour

The Sri Lankan cricket team toured Pakistan in March and April 1974, playing eight first-class matches, including two against Pakistan. Sri Lanka did not then have Test status. At the time it was Sri Lanka's longest tour.

== The team ==
- Anura Tennekoon (captain)
- Ranjit Fernando (vice-captain)
- Dennis Chanmugam
- Ajit de Silva
- Somachandra de Silva
- David Heyn
- Sridharan Jeganathan
- Lalith Kaluperuma
- Duleep Mendis
- Tony Opatha
- Gajan Pathmanathan
- Nihal Samarasekera
- Jayantha Seneviratne
- Bandula Warnapura
- Sunil Wettimuny

== The tour ==
Sri Lanka began with a seven-wicket victory over Sind, and a drawn match against Punjab. In the first four-day match against Pakistan, at Lahore, Pakistan made 302 for 9 declared and 420 for 7; Sri Lanka made 369.

Two more drawn matches followed, against the North West Frontier Province Governor's XI and Pakistan Universities, before a 124-run victory over Pakistan Western Railways, and a draw against Pakistan Under-19. In the second match against Pakistan, at Karachi, Pakistan made 216 and 224, and Sri Lanka made 265 and 158, giving Pakistan victory by 17 runs.

Tony Opatha was the highest wicket-taker on either side in the two matches against Pakistan, with 12 wickets at an average of 19.83. Zaheer Abbas was the highest run-scorer, with 251 runs at 62.75.

== Aftermath ==
Sri Lanka's performance in the two matches against Pakistan led the President of the Board of Control for Cricket in Pakistan, A. H. Kardar, to urge the International Cricket Conference to consider promoting Sri Lanka to Test status. When Sri Lanka played their first Test in 1982, six of this touring team (Ajit de Silva, Somachandra de Silva, Kaluperuma, Mendis, Warnapura and Wettimuny) were in the side.
