= Sri Lankan cricket team in Australia and New Zealand in 1982–83 =

International cricket tour

The Sri Lankan national cricket team toured Australia and New Zealand in February and March 1983 and played a two-match Test series against the New Zealand national cricket team. New Zealand won the series 2–0. New Zealand were captained by Geoff Howarth and Sri Lanka by Somachandra de Silva. In addition, the teams played a three-match series of Limited Overs Internationals (LOI) which New Zealand won 3–0. The Australian leg of the tour consisted of two first-class matches but no Tests.

== One Day Internationals (ODIs) ==
New Zealand won the Rothmans Cup 3–0.

=== 1st ODI ===
2 March 1983
Scorecard

New Zealand; 183/8 (50 overs)	v	Sri Lanka; 118/9 (50 overs)
JG Wright 45 (82); VB John 3/28 (10 overs)		Y Goonasekera 23 (60); RJ Hadlee 3/9 (8 overs)

New Zealand won by 65 runs
Carisbrook, Dunedin
Umpires: SC Cowman and IC Higginson
Player of the match: JG Wright (NZ)

- Sri Lanka won the toss and elected to field.
- RG de Alwis, ERNS Fernando, Y Goonasekera and MD Wettimuny (all SL) made their Test debuts.

=== 2nd ODI ===
19 March 1983
Scorecard

Sri Lanka; 167/8 (50 overs)	v	New Zealand; 168/3 (36.4 overs)
DS de Silva 37* (29); BL Cairns 2/25 (10 overs)		JJ Crowe 46* (89); DS de Silva 1/28 (6 overs)

New Zealand won by 7 wickets
McLean Park, Napier
Umpires: FR Goodall and DA Kinsella
Player of the match: MD Crowe (NZ)

- New Zealand won the toss and elected to field.

=== 3rd ODI ===
20 March 1983
Scorecard

New Zealand; 304/5 (50 overs)	v	Sri Lanka; 188/6 (50 overs)
GM Turner 140 (130); RJ Ratnayake 2/50 (10 overs)		ERNS Fernando 36 (72); BL Cairns 4/23 (10 overs)

New Zealand won by 116 runs
Eden Park, Auckland
Umpires: IC Higginson and SJ Woodward
Player of the match: GM Turner (NZ)

- New Zealand won the toss and elected to bat.
- S Jeganathan (SL) made his ODI debut.

== Test series summary ==
=== First Test ===
4–6 March 1983
Scorecard

New Zealand	v	Sri Lanka
344 (101.5 overs); WK Lees 89 (180); RJ Ratnayake 3/93 (31 overs)		144 (53.3 overs); S Wettimuny 63 (139); RJ Hadlee 4/33 (13.3 overs)
		175 (f/o) (81.5 overs); DS de Silva 52 (111); BL Cairns 4/47 (20 overs)

New Zealand won by an innings and 25 runs
Lancaster Park, Christchurch
Umpires: FR Goodall and DA Kinsella
Player of the match: WK Lees (NZ)

- Sri Lanka won the toss and elected to field.
- The match was scheduled for five days but completed in three.
- JJ Crowe (NZ), and RG de Alwis, ERNS Fernando, Y Goonasekera, S Jeganathan, VB John, RJ Ratnayake and MD Wettimuny (all SL) made their Test debuts.

=== Second Test ===
11–15 March 1983
Scorecard

Sri Lanka	v	New Zealand
240 (100.5 overs); RS Madugalle 79 (173); EJ Chatfield 4/66 (26.5 overs)		201 (72.2 overs); BL Cairns 45 (50); VB John 5/60 (25.2 overs)
93 (53 overs); Y Goonasekera 23 (66); RJ Hadlee 4/34 (17 overs)		134/4 (37.1 overs); BA Edgar 47* (110); DS de Silva 1/18 (6 overs)

New Zealand won by 6 wickets
Basin Reserve, Wellington
Umpires: IC Higginson and SJ Woodward

- New Zealand won the toss and elected to field.
- SAR Silva (SL) made his Test debut.
