= Fellinger =

Fellinger is a surname. Notable people with the surname include:

- David Fellinger (born 1969), Scottish footballer
- Károly Fellinger (born 1963), Slovak-Hungarian poet, writer and historian
- Marloes Fellinger (born 1982), Dutch softball player

== See also ==
- Felsinger
