= Janak Gamage =

Sri Lankan cricketer (born 1964)

Personal information
- Full name: Janak Champika Gamage
- Born: April 17, 1964 (age 62); Matara, Sri Lanka
- Batting: Right-handed
- Bowling: Right-arm fast-medium

International information
- National side: Sri Lanka (1995)
- ODI debut (cap 84): 29 March 1995 v New Zealand
- Last ODI: 9 April 1995 v India

Career statistics
Competition	ODI
Matches	4
Runs scored	8
Batting average	–
100s/50s	0/0
Top score	7*
Balls bowled	22
Wickets	3
Bowling average	34.66
5 wickets in innings	0
10 wickets in match	0
Best bowling	2/17
Catches/stumpings	2/–
- Source: Cricinfo, 1 May 2006

Janak Champika Gamage (born 17 April 1964) is a former Sri Lankan cricketer who played four One Day Internationals for Sri Lanka in 1995. He was born at Matara.

== Coaching career ==
Since his retirement, Gamage has taken up coaching. He coached the Bangladesh women's national team from August 2014 to May 2016, and was then hired to coach the Thailand women's national team.
