= Stanley de Silva =

Sri Lankan cricketer (1956–1980)

Personal information
- Full name: Deva Lokesh Stanley de Silva
- Born: 12 April 1956; Ambalangoda, Sri Lanka
- Died: 12 April 1980 (aged 23); Balapitiya, Sri Lanka
- Batting: Right-handed
- Bowling: Right-arm fast-medium

International information
- National side: Sri Lanka
- ODI debut (cap 14): 9 June 1979 v New Zealand
- Last ODI: 16 June 1979 v India

Career statistics
Competition	ODI
Matches	2
Runs scored	10
Batting average	10.00
100s/50s	0/0
Top score	10
Balls bowled	20
Wickets	2
Bowling average	27.00
5 wickets in innings	0
10 wickets in match	0
Best bowling	2/36
Catches/stumpings	1/–
- Source: Cricinfo, 1 May 2016

Deva Lokesh Stanley de Silva (17 November 1956 – 12 April 1980) was a Sri Lankan cricketer. A member of Sri Lanka's tour of England and Ireland in 1979, he played two One Day Internationals in the 1979 Cricket World Cup.

== Early career ==
Stanley de Silva was educated at Mahinda College, Galle, where he started his cricket career. He worked as an official of the Ceylon Tobacco Company.

== International career ==
A medium-fast right-arm swing bowler of real promise, he made his ODI debut against New Zealand at Trent Bridge, Nottingham. de Silva played an important part in Sri Lanka's first ever ODI win, which was recorded over India at the 1979 Prudential World Cup match that played at Old Trafford. In that game he captured the wickets of Anshuman Gaekwad and Kapil Dev for 36 runs, after bowling 12 overs.

== Death ==
Stanley de Silva died on 12 April 1980 at the early age of 23 in a motorcycle accident at Balapitiya, Sri Lanka. His early death was a blow to Sri Lanka's aspirations to be granted full Test status at the beginning of the 1980s.
