= Ajith Weerakkody =

Sri Lankan cricketer (born 1970)

Personal information
- Born: 1 October 1970 (age 56); Colombo
- Batting: Right-handed
- Bowling: Right-arm fast-medium

International information
- National side: Sri Lanka (1994)
- Only ODI (cap 80): 18 April 1994 v New Zealand

Career statistics
Competition	ODI
Matches	1
Runs scored	2
Batting average	2.00
100s/50s	0/0
Top score	2
Balls bowled	6
Wickets	0
Bowling average	–
5 wickets in innings	–
10 wickets in match	–
Best bowling	–
Catches/stumpings	0/–
- Source: Cricinfo, 1 May 2006

Ajith Priyantha Weerakkody (born 1 October 1970) is a former Sri Lankan cricketer who played one One Day International in 1994. He was born at Colombo.
