= Ranjan Gunatilleke =

Sri Lankan cricketer (born 1951)

Ranjan Goonetilleke
Personal information
- Full name: Frederick Ranjan Manilal de Silva Goonetilleke
- Born: 15 August 1951 (age 75); Colombo, Sri Lanka
- Batting: Right-handed
- Bowling: Right-arm medium

International information
- National side: Sri Lanka
- Only ODI (cap 18): 16 June 1979 v India

Career statistics
Competition	ODI
Matches	1
Runs scored	–
Batting average	–
100s/50s	–
Top score	–
Balls bowled	54
Wickets	0
Bowling average	–
5 wickets in innings	–
10 wickets in match	–
Best bowling	–
Catches/stumpings	0/–
- Source: Cricinfo, 1 May 2016

Frederick Ranjan Manilal de Silva Goonetilleke (born 15 August 1951), or Ranjan Goonetilleke, is a former Sri Lankan cricketer who played one One Day International (ODI) in the 1979 Cricket World Cup. In September 2018, he was one of 49 former Sri Lankan cricketers honoured for their services before Sri Lanka became a full member of the International Cricket Council (ICC).
