= Prasanna Ranatunga =

Sri Lankan politician (born 1967)

Hon. Prasanna Ranatunga
- ප්‍රසන්න රණතුංග பிரசன்ன ரணதுங்கா

Minister of Urban Development and Housing
- In office 14 May 2022 – 23 September 2024
- President: Gotabaya Rajapaksa; Ranil Wickramasinghe
- Prime Minister: Ranil Wickramasinghe; Dinesh Gunawardena
- Preceded by: Mahinda Rajapaksa

Chief Government Whip
- In office 18 April 2022 – 24 September 2024
- President: Gotabaya Rajapaksa; Ranil Wickramasinghe
- Preceded by: Johnston Fernando
- Succeeded by: Nalinda Jayatissa

Minister of Public Security
- In office 18 April 2022 – 9 May 2022
- President: Gotabaya Rajapaksa
- Prime Minister: Mahinda Rajapaksa
- Preceded by: Sarath Weerasekara
- Succeeded by: Tiran Alles

Minister of Tourism
- In office 12 August 2020 – 9 May 2022
- President: Gotabaya Rajapaksa
- Prime Minister: Mahinda Rajapaksa
- Preceded by: John Amaratunga
- Succeeded by: Harin Fernando

7th Chief Minister of Western Province
- In office 4 May 2009 – 1 September 2015
- Preceded by: Reginald Cooray
- Succeeded by: Isura Devapriya

Member of Parliament for Gampaha District
- In office 1 September 2015 – 24 September 2024

Personal details
- Born: 1 January 1967 (age 59) Sri Lanka
- Party: Sri Lanka Podujana Peramuna
- Spouse: Maureen
- Relations: Reggie (father); Arjuna (brother); Nishantha (brother); Dammika (brother); Sanjeeva (brother); Ruwan (brother)
- Children: Archana, Pavithra, Udara
- Education: Asoka College/ Ananda College

Prasanna Ranatunga (born 1 January 1967) is a Sri Lankan politician, former member of parliament, a former Minister of Urban Development and Housing. He was also appointed as the Chief Government Whip on 18 April 2022. He was the 7th Chief Minister of Western Province, Sri Lanka.

He belongs to the Sri Lanka Podujana Peramuna and is part of the Sri Lanka People's Freedom Alliance. He is the brother of former Sri Lanka cricket captain Arjuna Ranatunga. Ranatunga entered parliament in 2015 from Gampaha District as an opposition member. Ranatunga received a vote count of 384,448 in the 2015 parliamentary elections.

On 6 June 2022, he was sentenced to two years of rigorous imprisonment suspended for five years, after he was found guilty of threatening a businessman from whom he solicited a bribe of Rs. 64 million to evict unauthorised occupants of a parcel of land.

== See also ==
- List of political families in Sri Lanka
