= Granville de Silva =

Sri Lankan cricketer (born 1955)

Personal information
- Full name: Granville Nissanka de Silva
- Born: 12 March 1955 (age 71)
- Batting: Right-handed
- Bowling: Right-arm fast-medium

International information
- National side: Sri Lanka (1983–1985)
- ODI debut (cap 34): 30 April 1983 v Australia
- Last ODI: 28 January 1985 v Australia

Career statistics
Competition	ODI
Matches	4
Runs scored	9
Batting average	9.00
100s/50s	0/0
Top score	7
Balls bowled	194
Wickets	0
Bowling average	–
5 wickets in innings	–
10 wickets in match	–
Best bowling	–
Catches/stumpings	0/–
- Source: Cricinfo, 1 May 2006

Granville Nissanka de Silva (born 12 March 1955) is a Sri Lankan former cricketer who played four One Day International matches between 1983 and 1985. He was born at Colombo in 1955.
