= Jayantha Seneviratne =

Personal information
- Full name: Jayantha Seneviratne
- Born: 6 June 1952 (age 74); Colombo, Western Province, Ceylon
- Batting: Right-handed
- Bowling: Right-arm medium

Domestic team information
- Years: Team
- 1973/74–1975/76: Sri Lanka Board President's XI
- 1973/74: Bloomfield Cricket and Athletic Club

Career statistics
Competition	First-class	List A
Matches	16	7
Runs scored	646	68
Batting average	30.76	11.33
100s/50s	–/6	–/–
Top score	98*	31*
Balls bowled	328	7
Wickets	4	–
Bowling average	29.75	–
5 wickets in innings	–	–
10 wickets in match	–	–
Best bowling	2/72	–
Catches/stumpings	12/–	1/–
- Source: Cricinfo, 27 January 2012

Jayantha Seneviratne (born 6 June 1952) is a former cricketer who played first-class cricket for Sri Lanka cricket team from 1973 to 1979, playing in five unofficial Test matches against India, Pakistan and the West Indies.

== Cricket career ==
He was educated at Nalanda College, Colombo, where he played cricket for the first XI from 1968 to 1970. After leaving school, he played for Bloomfield Cricket and Athletic Club in Colombo. He represented the Sri Lanka Board President's XI in 1973, and the Sri Lanka national team in 1974 and 1975.

He made his highest first-class score of 98 not out, the highest score of the match, when Sri Lanka lost by 17 runs to Pakistan in Karachi in 1973-74.

Jayantha is a former national selector and national coaching committee member of Sri Lanka Cricket, the governing body for cricket in Sri Lanka. He also coached Bhutan, and has served as a curator. He also runs a private coaching school and has coached at Nalanda College for many years.

== Personal life ==
He and his wife Mekala live in Kohuwala, Colombo. They have three daughters.
