= Sunil Jayasinghe =

Sri Lankan cricketer (1955–1995)

Personal information
- Full name: Sunil Asoka Jayasinghe
- Born: 15 July 1955; Matugama, Dominion of Ceylon
- Died: 20 April 1995 (aged 39); Sri Lanka
- Batting: Right-handed
- Role: Wicket-keeper

International information
- National side: Sri Lanka
- ODI debut (cap 16): 9 June 1979 v New Zealand
- Last ODI: 16 June 1979 v India

Career statistics
Competition	ODI	First-class
Matches	2	6
Runs scored	1	183
Batting average	1.00	30.50
100s/50s	0/0	0/2
Top score	1	64
Catches/stumpings	1/0	10/4
- Source: Cricinfo, 1 May 2006

Sunil Asoka Jayasinghe (15 July 1955 – 20 April 1995) was a Sri Lankan cricketer who played two One Day Internationals during the 1979 Cricket World Cup competition (the subsequent British Isles tour incorporated his only first-class appearances).

He was educated at Nalanda College Colombo and captained the college first XI team in 1974. For many years he represented Bloomfield CC and during the 1982/83 Lakspray Trophy compiled a monumental 283 against Colombo CC (this tournament was only recognised as first-class from 1988 to 1989).

He killed himself at the age of 39.
