= Nilantha Ratnayake =

Sri Lankan cricketer (born 1968)

Personal information
- Full name: Nilantha Lakshitha Kithsiri Ratnayake
- Born: 22 November 1968 (age 57); Colombo, Sri Lanka
- Batting: Left-handed
- Bowling: Right-arm fast-medium

International information
- National side: Sri Lanka (1989–1990)
- ODI debut (cap 56): 24 March 1989 v Pakistan
- Last ODI: 10 February 1990 v Pakistan
- Source: , 1 May 2006

Nilantha Lakshitha Kithsiri Ratnayake (born 22 November 1968), or Nilantha Ratnayake, is a former Sri Lankan cricketer who played two One Day Internationals: one in March 1989 during a tour of Pakistan, and one in February 1990 as part of a Benson and Hedges World Series.
