= Commonwealth Nations Bridge Championships =

Sports competition

The Commonwealth Nations Bridge Championships are a contract bridge competition held every four years in conjunction with the Commonwealth Games.

== 2002 ==
The first Championship was held in Manchester, England. The event was held at Whitworth Hall, part of the University of Manchester from 15 until 20 July 2002.

Canada defeated Wales for the gold medal. India captured the bronze medal.

There were 28 entries.

- Antigua and Barbuda - Sydney Christian, Duncan Finch, Al James, Errol James and Junia Nibbs.
- Australia - Ishmael Del'Monte, George Gasper, Paul Marston and Bob Richman.
- Barbados - Leslie Atherley, Colin Depradine, Michael Gill, Roglyn Hinds, Charles Hollingsworth and Alan Moss.
- Bermuda - John Glynn, Vera Petty, Roman Smolski, David Sykes and Sally Sykes.
- Canada - Keith Balcombe, Gordon Campbell, Judith Gartaganis and Nicholas Gartaganis.
- England - Michelle Brunner, David Burn, Brian Callaghan, Rhona Goldenfield, David Mossop and David Price.
- Guernsey - Margaret Allen, Mike Allen, Rudi Falla, Andy Hall, Dick Langham and Jill Morgan.
- Guyana - Amina Beepat, Dennis Beepat, Ramdat Rampersaud and Colin Yhap.
- India - C R Bandrinath, Sunit Choksi, R Krishnan, P Sridharen, S Sundarram and K R Venkataraman.
- Isle of Man - Harry Beere, Andy Elliot, Robin Hicks, John Large, Tag O'Mahoney, John Stewart and Geoffrey Whittaker.
- Jamaica - Wayne Chai-Chong, Michael Coore, Rex James, David Levy, Tony Roberts and Calvin Wong.
- Jersey - David Friswell, Carl Harrison, David Hole, Marion Miles, Sue Rankin and Douglas Romain.
- Kenya - K V Bhatt, Rita Chandra, Sushil Chandra and R C Sharma.
- Malaysia - Siew Heng Chang, Siew Kwan Chang, Dr Teong Wah Lim and David Law.
- Malta - Oliver Clare, Francis Consiglio, Joan Consiglio, Mario Dix, Irene Naudi, Margaret Parnis England and Albert Sacco.
- Mauritius - Farouk Ghaws, Balkrishna Gokulsing, Chabilal Gokulsing, Herve Govinden, Nandansing Hurpaul, Brigitte Ribet and Garry Lam Po Tang.
- Northern Ireland - Ceara Burns, Michael Coffrey, John Lavery, Ian Lindsay, John Murchan and Robert Plunkett.
- Pakistan
- Saint Lucia - Johnson Cenac, Dr George Forde, Hon Dr Walter Francois, Enrico Lewis, Hon Mario Michel and Dexter Theodore.
- Scotland - Charles Outred, Vi Outred, Les Steel and Willie Whittaker.
- Singapore - Changsong Chen, Steven Chi, Aik Koan Heng, Kuo Tang Liao, Feng Li and Likun Xing.
- South Africa - Alon Apteker, Wayne Chu, Bernard Donde, Duggie Ettlinger, Craig Gower and Glen Holman.
- Sri Lanka - Y R Karunartne, Ashantha de Mel, Fritz Penera and Anton Selvananyagam.
- Tanzania - Mahen Gandhi, Sulemanji Girnary, Sajal Rakhit, Sajjad Salehebai and Satiss Soochak.
- Trinidad and Tobago - David Clarke, Trevor Hart, Roger Mapp, Mohan Seepersad and Dean Seeteram.
- Uganda - Joseph Almeida, Rajan Dixit, V Mohan, Bharti Popat and Suru Popat.
- Wales - Adam Dunn, Peter Goodman, Dafydd Jones, Gary Jones, Jim Luck, Filip Kurbalija and Tim Rees.
- Zimbabwe - Michael Bourdillon, Andrew Brooke, Gail Cameron, Leif-Erik Stabell and Vanessa Vos.

== 2006 ==
The second Commonwealth Nations Bridge Championship was held in Murrumbeena, Victoria near Melbourne on 7–12 March 2006.

The competition was won by India, with England coming in second and Australia finishing in third.

== 2010 ==
The third championship was held in Delhi, India from 24 until 29 October 2010.

Participants were Australia, Australia Ladies, Bangladesh, England, Guernsey, India 1, India 2, India Ladies, Kenya, Malaysia, New Zealand, Scotland, South Africa, Sri Lanka, Tanzania, Uganda, Wales plus the Chairman's Team and six sponsored teams.

The Scotland Team winning the gold medal was Brian Spears, John Murdoch, Derek Sanders, Derek Diamond, Irving Gordon and Sandy Duncan.

== 2014 ==
The fourth championships were held in Glasgow, Scotland, on 8–14 September 2014. The Chairman's team of Paul Hackett, David Bakhshi, Jason Hackett, David Mossop, Justin Hackett and Andrew McIntosh have won the championship, beating Wales in the final. Wales secured the gold medals for being the highest placed national team. England won the silver medals and India the bronze.

The accompanying Transnational Swiss Teams was won by the Scottish President's team, who beat Canada in the final and were represented by Sandy Duncan, Irving Gordon, Derek Sanders, Stephen Peterkin, Liz McGowan and Sam Punch. The Open Pairs was won by Andrew McIntosh and David Bakhshi.

Participants were Australia, Australia Women, Barbados, Canada, England, England 2, Guernsey, Guernsey 2, India, Isle of Man, Jersey, Kenya, Malaysia, Malta, Northern Ireland, Pakistan, Pakistan 2, SBU, Scotland, Singapore, South Africa, South Africa 2, Wales, Wales 2 plus the Chairman's Team, the Scottish President's Team and 2 sponsored teams (Harris and Black Swan).

== 2018 Gold Coast ==
The fifth championships were held in Gold Coast, Queensland, Australia from 14–18 February 2018. The championship was won by India A, beating Australia Gold in the final. The Invitational Pairs competition was won by Jaggy Shivdasani and Rajeshwar Tiwari.

Participants were ACT, Australia Gold, Australia Green, Australia Seniors, Australia Women, Canada Red, Canada White, England A, England B, Guernsey, India A, India B, Isle of Man, Malaysia, New Zealand, NSW, Queensland Gold, Queensland Maroon, SA, Scotland Blue, Scotland White, Singapore, South Africa 1, South Africa 2, Tasmania, WA Diamonds and Wales plus the President's Team, Black Swan, Brown, House Team, Leibowitz, Magic Eyes, Moren and Vajari BC.

== See also ==
- Commonwealth Chess Championship
