= Nihal Samarasekera =

Sri Lankan cricketer

Cricket information
- Role: Opening bowler

Career statistics
Competition	First-class
Matches	9
Runs scored	92
Batting average	10.22
100s/50s	0/0
Top score	38
Balls bowled	1292
Wickets	27
Bowling average	24.18
5 wickets in innings	0
10 wickets in match	0
Best bowling	4/44
Catches/stumpings	5/0
- Source: Cricinfo, 26 November 2019

Nihal Samarasekera is a former Sri Lankan cricketer who played first-class cricket for Ceylon from 1967 to 1974.

Samarasekera attended St. Sylvester's College in Kandy. An opening bowler, he made his first-class debut for Ceylon in the Gopalan Trophy match in 1966–67. In the Gopalan Trophy match in 1967–68, opening the bowling with Sarath Wimalaratne, who took five wickets in each innings, Samarasekera took 4 for 44 and 2 for 48 in the victory for the Ceylon Board President's Under-27s XI over Madras.

He toured Pakistan with the Sri Lankan team in 1973–74, playing in four of the eight first-class matches, but other bowlers were preferred for the two matches against Pakistan. He played no further first-class cricket after the tour.
