= Wendell Labrooy =

Sri Lankan match referee

Personal information
- Full name: Wendell Cleophus Labrooy
- Born: 25 September 1971 (age 55); Katunayake, Western Province, Sri Lanka
- Batting: Left-handed
- Bowling: Right-arm fast-medium
- Relatives: Graeme Labrooy (brother)

Career statistics
Competition	First-class	List A
Matches	80	32
Runs scored	1,652	167
Batting average	19.43	8.35
100s/50s	1/6	0/0
Top score	101	29
Balls bowled	9,834	1152
Wickets	241	29
Bowling average	28.79	28.58
5 wickets in innings	9	0
10 wickets in match	1	0
Best bowling	8/83	3/30
Catches/stumpings	37/–	4/–
- Source: Cricinfo, 1 February 2022

Wendell Cleophus Labrooy (born 25 September 1971) is a former Sri Lankan domestic cricketer who also currently serves as an international match referee. He played as a left handed batsman and bowled right arm medium fast in domestic matches.

Although he couldn't make it into the national team, his elder brother Graeme Labrooy managed to represent in Sri Lanka in international matches on the back of impressive domestic performances. Wendell has also worked as a banker at the Hatton National Bank.

== Biography ==
His elder brother Graeme is also an elite international match referee. His younger brother Maxwell Labrooy who was also the third brother in the Labrooy family also played school cricket. His father Donald Labrooy was a renowned national level boxer who had represented Sri Lanka in many boxing competitions. Donald died in June 2020.

== Early years ==
He pursued his education at Maris Stella College in Negombo just like his other two brothers. He played school cricket for Maris Stella College and captained the Maris Stella College cricket team.

His major achievement during school cricket came in 1990 when he went onto score 1000 runs in a single school cricket season while also capturing 73 wickets opening the bowling. He incidentally served as the captain of the Maris Stella College when he achieved the double of 1000 runs and 50 wickets in 1990 season.

He was also the first schoolboy cricketer representing Maris Stella College to score 1000 runs in a single season. For his stellar performances, he also received the first runner-up award among outstation schoolboys during the Sunday Observer Schoolboy Cricketer of the Year award ceremony in 1991 and also won the runner-up awards for best batsman and bowler.

He played for Sri Lanka U19 team primarily during the early 1980s and late 1990s although he was never in contention for a place in the senior side mainly due to lack of international matches for Sri Lanka during the time. He was an established and proven performer at domestic cricket arena as an allrounder and has played club cricket for Burgher Recreation Club, Nondescripts Cricket Club, Colombo Cricket Club and Sebastianites Cricket and Athletic Club.

He joined HNB in 1993 and has also went onto play for HNB in mercantile cricket tournaments.

== Umpiring career ==
It was revealed that he initially wanted to be an umpire at first-class level and international level and he even attended the local umpire's examination way back in 2006 alongside the likes of Kumar Dharmasena, Lyndon Hannibal and Ruchira Palliyaguruge. However, his umpiring dream did not materialize due to his decision to play club cricket in Australia in 2006. On his return from Australia to Sri Lanka, he realized that Sri Lanka Cricket had stuck with a set number of referees and decided to umpire at low-tier competitions including mill division III and mill division II.

== Career as referee ==
In November 2017, he was inducted to the ICC Panel of Match Referees and his first assignment as international match referee came during Sri Lanka women's bilateral home series against Pakistan in March 2018. Since then he had primarily served as a match referee in Women's ODIs and T20Is. He also officiated as match referee in 2020 Lanka Premier League and 2021 Lanka Premier League.

In January 2022, he stood in as match referee for the first time in a men's international match during the first ODI between Afghanistan and the Netherlands in Qatar.
