= Ian Higginson =

New Zealand cricket umpire

Personal information
- Full name: Ian Colin Higginson
- Born: 10 May 1947 (age 79); Rangiora, Canterbury Region, New Zealand

Umpiring information
- Tests umpired: 1 (1983)
- ODIs umpired: 4 (1983–1984)
- WODIs umpired: 2 (1982)
- Source: Cricinfo, 7 July 2013

Ian Higginson (born 10 May 1947) is a former New Zealand cricket umpire. He stood in one Test match, when New Zealand played Sri Lanka, in 1983 and two ODI games in 1983 and 1984.

== See also ==
- List of Test cricket umpires
- List of One Day International cricket umpires
