= Anura Ranasinghe =

Sri Lankan cricketer

Personal information
- Born: 13 October 1956; Kalutara
- Died: 9 November 1998 (aged 42); Colombo
- Batting: Right-handed
- Bowling: Left-arm medium

International information
- National side: Sri Lanka (1975–1982)
- Test debut (cap 13): 14 March 1982 v England
- Last Test: 17 September 1982 v India
- ODI debut (cap 8): 7 June 1975 v West Indies
- Last ODI: 15 September 1982 v India

Career statistics
Competition	Test	ODI
Matches	2	9
Runs scored	88	153
Batting average	22.00	21.85
100s/50s	0/1	0/1
Top score	77	51
Balls bowled	19	324
Wickets	1	2
Bowling average	69.00	140.50
5 wickets in innings	0	0
10 wickets in match	0	0
Best bowling	1/23	1/21
Catches/stumpings	0/–	0/–
- Source: ESPNcricinfo, 22 September 2016

Anura Nandana Ranasinghe (13 October 1956 – 9 November 1998) was a Sri Lankan cricketer, who represented Sri Lanka at international level 11 times.

== School times ==
Ranasinghe won the best schoolboy cricketer award during the 1974–75 cricketing season when he first played cricket for Nalanda College Colombo.

== International career ==
Ranasinghe created history in 1975 when he became the first schoolboy to play in a World Cup when he represented Sri Lanka in the inaugural tournament in England at the age of 18 years. He played in all three matches against West Indies, Australia and Pakistan in the 1975 World Cup for Sri Lanka, scoring a total of 19 runs in three innings and conceding 65 runs from ten overs.

A shoulder injury meant that he was not considered for the 1979 World Cup. He was named in the 12 for the inaugural Test match where England played against Sri Lanka, but was left out on the morning of the game in favour of Lalith Kaluperuma. He did play in two ODIs against England, but his fortunes were the reverse of Sri Lanka's – in the first ODI, he scored a quickfire 51, but was caught by Geoff Cook just as Sri Lanka needed to up the run rate to chase England's total. They finished six runs short of victory. In the second, Ranasinghe recorded a duck, and yet Sri Lanka won by three runs – although his nine economical overs, conceding only 37 runs, had some say in the win.

His ODI performances may have played a part into his call-up for the 1981–82 tour of Pakistan. He didn't play the first Test, but came in for Ravi Ratnayeke in the second, the selectors wanting to bolster the batting. Despite the Sri Lankans doing well, Ranasinghe contributed little, scoring only eleven runs in two innings and bowling twelve overs for 40 runs – also taking the wicket of wicket-keeper Ashraf Ali.

He was dropped again for the third Test, but returned later in 1982, for Sri Lanka's 1982–83 tour of India. His first innings was another disappointment, as he was dismissed for a duck, but a rearguard 77 against Kapil Dev and Dilip Doshi ensured that Sri Lanka could draw the match. That was his last international game of cricket, however, as the South Africa tour meant that his career was curtailed.

=== Ban ===
Ranasinghe's career, however, was cut short by deciding to tour South Africa in 1982–83, which resulted in him getting a 25-year ban from all cricket. When the ban was lifted in 1990, he returned for a few games, but then retired.

== Death ==
Ranasinghe died of a heart attack in Colombo, aged 42.

Nalanda Junior Old Boys Association (NJOBA) organises Old Ananda Nalanda Test Cricketers' Limited Over Encounter and it is named after Anura Ranasinghe.
