= Keerthi Ranasinghe =

Sri Lankan cricketer (born 1962)

Personal information
- Full name: Sirimewan Keerthi Ranasinghe
- Born: 4 July 1962 (age 64); Colombo, Sri Lanka
- Batting: Right-handed
- Bowling: Right-arm medium

International information
- National side: Sri Lanka
- ODI debut (cap 47): 2 March 1986 v Pakistan
- Last ODI: 5 April 1986 v New Zealand

Career statistics
Competition	ODI
Matches	4
Runs scored	55
Batting average	18.33
100s/50s	0/0
Top score	41
Balls bowled	21
Wickets	3
Bowling average	32.00
5 wickets in innings	0
10 wickets in match	0
Best bowling	1/28
Catches/stumpings	1/–
- Source: Cricinfo, 1 May 2016

Sirimewan Keerthi Ranasinghe (born 4 July 1962) is a Sri Lankan cricketer who played four One Day Internationals in 1986.

He studied at Nalanda College Colombo and captained the college first XI cricket team in 1982.

His four appearances for the Sri Lanka national cricket team include three games against Pakistan and one against New Zealand.

Following his international career, he moved to the United Kingdom. He was a professional Middlesex CCC coach who trains youth at the Finchley Academy.

Ranasinghe now works as head coach at Westminster School.
