= Alane Felsinger =

Sri Lankan cricket umpire (born 1937)

Personal information
- Full name: Alane Carl Felsinger
- Born: 10 July 1937 (age 89); Borella, Sri Lanka
- Relatives: Herbi Felsinger (brother)

Umpiring information
- Tests umpired: 1 (1986)
- Source: Cricinfo, 7 June 2019

Alane Felsinger (born 10 July 1937) is a former Sri Lankan cricket umpire. He stood in one Test match, Sri Lanka vs. Pakistan in 1986. His brother Herbi was also an international umpire for Sri Lanka.

== See also ==
- List of Test cricket umpires
- Pakistani cricket team in Sri Lanka in 1985–86
