= Chamara Dunusinghe =

Sri Lankan Australian cricketer (born 1970)

Personal information
- Full name: Chamara Iroshan Dunusinghe
- Born: October 19, 1970 (age 56); Colombo, Sri Lanka
- Batting: Right-handed

International information
- National side: Sri Lanka (1995)
- Test debut (cap 64): 11 March 1995 v New Zealand
- Last Test: 22 September 1995 v Pakistan
- Only ODI (cap 86): 6 April 1995 v Bangladesh

Career statistics
Competition	Test	ODI
Matches	5	1
Runs scored	160	1
Batting average	16.00	1.00
100s/50s	0/1	0/0
Top score	91	1
Catches/stumpings	13/2	1/1
- Source: Cricinfo, 9 February 2006

Chamara Iroshan Dunusinghe (born October 19, 1970, Colombo) is a Sri Lankan Australian former cricketer who played in 5 Tests and one ODI from in 1995. He attended Nalanda College Colombo.

== International career ==
Chamara is the 64th Sri Lanka Test Cap, when he made his debut in New Zealand Vs Sri Lanka at Napier New Zealand 1994/95 and scored 91. He also became the first Sri Lankan to be dismissed for nervous 90's on test debut.
