= Arjuna Ranatunga =

Sri Lankan cricketer and politician

Hon. Deshamanya Arjuna Ranatunga MP
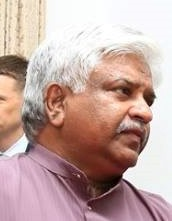
- Ranatunga in 2017

Minister of Transport and Civil Aviation
- In office 20 December 2018 – 21 November 2019
- President: Maithripala Sirisena
- Prime Minister: Ranil Wickremesinghe
- Preceded by: Nimal Siripala de Silva
- Succeeded by: Mahinda Amaraweera

Ministry of Petroleum Resources Development
- In office 22 May 2017 – 26 October 2018
- President: Maithripala Sirisena
- Prime Minister: Ranil Wickremesinghe
- Preceded by: Chandima Weerakkody
- Succeeded by: Kabir Hashim

Minister of Ports & Shipping
- In office 12 January 2015 – 22 May 2017
- President: Maithripala Sirisena
- Prime Minister: Ranil Wickremesinghe
- Preceded by: Mahinda Rajapaksa
- Succeeded by: Mahinda Samarasinghe

Deputy Minister of Tourism
- In office 2005–2008
- President: Mahinda Rajapaksa
- Prime Minister: Ratnasiri Wickremanayake

Member of Parliament for Gampaha District
- In office 2015–2020

Member of Parliament for Kalutara District
- In office 2010–2015

Member of Parliament for Colombo District
- In office 2001–2010

President of Sri Lanka Cricket
- In office 2008–2009
- Incumbent
- Assumed office 6 November 2023

Personal details
- Born: 1 December 1963 (age 62) Gampaha, Ceylon (now in Sri Lanka)
- Party: Democratic National Movement (2015– present); Sri Lanka Freedom Party (2001 - 2010, 2015); Democratic National Alliance (2010 - 2015)
- Other political affiliations: United National Front for Good Governance (2015– present); United People's Freedom Alliance (2004–2010,2015); People's Alliance (2001–2004)
- Education: Ananda College Colombo
- Occupation: Politician, Cricketer
- Cricket career

Personal information
- Nickname: Captain Cool
- Height: 1.73 m (5 ft 8 in)
- Batting: Left-handed
- Bowling: Right-arm medium
- Role: Batsman

International information
- National side: Sri Lanka (1982–2000)
- Test debut (cap 9): 17 February 1982 v England
- Last Test: 6 August 2000 v South Africa
- ODI debut (cap 24): 14 February 1982 v England
- Last ODI: 30 May 1999 v Kenya

Domestic team information
- Years: Team
- 1982–2001: Sinhalese Sports Club

Career statistics
Competition	Test	ODI	FC	LA
Matches	93	269	205	307
Runs scored	5,105	7,456	11,641	8,491
Batting average	35.69	35.84	44.26	35.82
100s/50s	4/38	4/49	25/63	4/55
Top score	135*	131*	238*	131*
Balls bowled	2,120	4,710	7,096	4,255
Wickets	16	79	94	98
Bowling average	65.00	47.55	32.81	43.41
5 wickets in innings	0	0	2	0
10 wickets in match	0	0	0	0
Best bowling	2/20	4/14	5/45	4/14
Catches/stumpings	47/–	63/–	108/–	78/–
Medal record
Men's Cricket
Representing Sri Lanka
ICC Cricket World Cup
Winner	1996 India-Pakistan-Sri Lanka
- Source: Cricinfo, 8 September 2015

Deshamanya Arjuna Ranatunga (Sinhala: අර්ජුන රණතුංග; Tamil: அர்ஜூன ரணதுங்க; born 1 December 1963), is a Sri Lankan politician and former cricketer, who was the 1996 Cricket World Cup winning captain for Sri Lanka, and scored the winning boundary in the final. He is regarded as the pioneer who lifted the Sri Lankan cricket team from underdog status to a leading force in the cricketing world.

After retirement, he worked in many posts of Sri Lanka Cricket administration. By entering his father's stream of politics, Ranatunga started his political career in 2005, and is now the former cabinet Minister of Transport and Civil Aviation.

Upon retirement from playing cricket he entered politics, joining the Sri Lanka Freedom Party and entered parliament, from Colombo District, in the 2001 elections. He served a tenure as deputy minister for tourism, and also served as the president of Sri Lanka Cricket until December 2008. He joined the Democratic National Alliance in 2010 and contested the 2010 elections. In January 2021, he revealed that he would distance himself from the United National Party and would not take part in party activities in the future.

He was also known for nurturing young cricket talents including the likes of Praveen Jayawickrama in their young days to take up the sport of cricket seriously. He was recently appointed the interim head of the Sri Lanka Cricket after the Sri Lankan government suspended the Sri Lanka Cricket Board after their loss to Indian Cricket Team in the ongoing Cricket World Cup.

== Personal life ==
Arjuna Ranatunga is the son of Reggie Padmasena Ranatunga, the third Governor of Sabaragamuwa, serving between June 2005 and February 2008. His mother Nandani Ranatunga is a retired teacher. He has five siblings; cricketer Sanjeeva Ranatunga, along with Dammika Ranatunga, Nishantha Ranatunga, Prasanna Ranatunga, and Ruwan Ranatunga. He was born on 1 December 1963 in Gampaha near Colombo. He has a son Dhyan Ranatunga who is also a cricketer who currently lives in United States and in 2021, he was also signed to play for Minor League Cricket tournament in the USA.

== Cricket career ==
=== Alma Mater ===
Ranatunga received his education at Ananda College, which has produced many known faces in Sri Lanka. Marvan Atapattu Sidath Wettimuny, Thilan Samaraweera, Dinesh Chandimal and Thilina Kandamby are among the players to pass out from Ananda College. He won the Observer Sri Lankan Schoolboy Cricketer of the Year award on two occasions in 1980 and 1982 and became the first person to receive the award twice.

=== Junior World Cricket ===
Ranatunga played for Sri Lanka under-20 against India under-20 in 1980. In his very first game, he scored 128 not out. That Indian team featured the likes of Ravi Shastri, Lalchand Rajput, Sadanand Vishwanath, Chandrakant Pandit, Laxman Sivaramakrishnan and Bharat Arun.

=== Early international career ===
Arjuna Ranatunga made his test debut on 17 February 1982 against England at the age of 18 in Sri Lanka's first ever test match at the P. Sara Oval. He scored 50 on test debut and also became the first Sri Lankan to score a half century in test cricket. He also shared a 99 run partnership with Ranjan Madugalle for the fourth wicket in Sri Lanka's inaugural test match. He was also working as an insurance broker in his early days of his international career. He made his debut World Cup appearance for Sri Lanka during the 1983 Cricket World Cup. He then featured in Sri Lanka's historical test match against England at Lord's in 1984 which also marked Sri Lanka's first ever test match at Lord's.

He along with Asanka Gurusinha became the first pair of Sri Lankan batters to bat out the entire day of a test match for Sri Lanka with an unbroken partnership of 240 runs on a wicketless final day of the match against Pakistan at the P. Sara Oval in 1986 which also eventually led to a draw. Both came on to bat on a decisive fourth day of the test match when Sri Lanka was reeling at 83/3 and the duo endured resistance against the Pakistani bowling attack with the likes of Imran Khan, Abdul Qadir and Wasim Akram. Ranatunga ended up with a career best knock of unbeaten 135 while Gurusinha remained undefeated on 116 as Sri Lanka posted 323/3 at the end of the play on Day 5.

He was a key member of the Sri Lankan side which won its maiden Asia Cup title in 1986. He also top scored for Sri Lanka in the 1986 Asia Cup final against Pakistan scoring 57 runs off just 55 balls to propel Sri Lanka to a comfortable run chase of 192 with 7.4 overs to spare. He was also the leading run scorer of the tournament with an aggregate of 105 runs and was also adjudged as the player of the series in addition to his all-round display in the tournament taking 4 wickets.

=== Captaincy ===
Ranatunga went on to captain the Sri Lanka national cricket team in 1988, taking control of it for the next eleven years, transforming it from a weak, routinely defeated team into a competitive and successful unit. He propelled Sri Lanka in a massive run chase of 313 against Zimbabwe at the 1992 World Cup by scoring unbeaten 88 which also marked the first instance that a team had successfully chased down the target in excess 300 in ODI history. Aravinda de Silva was the team captain at the 1992 World Cup.

He led the team to win the 1996 World Cup and he scored the winning runs for Sri Lanka in the final and remained unbeaten on 47. His innovative captaincy took a Sri Lanka team, given little chance prior to the competition, for cricket's greatest prize. His strategies were commended by many cricketing greats and followed by their teams. He was the brain behind the strategy of scoring as many runs as possible in the first 15 overs of an ODI match in which there are field restrictions. This strategy was still followed by the batsmen in the Powerplays. He was widely recognised as a belligerent leader and was famous for defending his players at all costs regardless of what they did.

He also captained Sri Lanka to triumph at the 1997 Asia Cup at home defeating India in the final to lift their second Asia Cup title and also it happened to be the first Asia Cup title for Sri Lanka since 1986 after a gap of 11 years. Ranatunga was also the top run scorer of the 1997 Asia Cup tournament with a tally of 272 runs with a remarkable average of 136 including a century and two fifties.

Under his captaincy, Sri Lanka secured their first ever historic test win in English soil against England and also the first ever test series win for Sri Lanka in England against England which happened to be in 1998 just two years after winning the 50 over World Cup. Sri Lanka secured a memorable 10 wicket win in that one-off test match and Ranatunga became the first Sri Lankan captain to register a test victory in England.

His younger brother Dammika Ranatunga made his test debut against Australia in 1989-90 when Arjuna was the captain of the Sri Lankan test side. It also became the first instance for Sri Lanka cricket whereas a cricketer had made his international debut for a team captained by his brother. Another one of is another brothers, Sanjeewa Ranatunga, also made his test debut when Arjuna was still the captain of Sri Lankan test side.

=== 1996 World Cup ===
Arjuna Ranatunga is one of Sri Lanka's greatest captains. He led the national team to victory in the 1996 World Cup. He represented Sri Lanka in 93 Tests and 269 One-Day Internationals (ODIs). While Ranatunga scored 241 runs during Sri Lanka's 1996 World Cup winning campaign, he finished with the highest average in the tournament. There were other batsmen who scored more prolifically in the tournament, but Ranatunga's average of 120.50 stood out. The next best was Aravinda de Silva with 89.60. For batsmen with over 100 runs in the tournament, Ranatunga had the second highest strike rate with 114.76. Only Sanath Jayasuriya was ahead with 131.54.

=== Retirement ===
Ranatunga lost the national team captaincy in 1999 after Sri Lanka's poor showing at the World Cup in England, although he was chosen as one of five Wisden Cricketers of the Year for that year.

In June 2000, Ranatunga played in Sri Lanka's 100th Test match, becoming the only player to represent his country in their first and hundredth Test. He retired from playing cricket in 2001 and became a television commentator. In 2005, he joined the International Cricket Council's cricket committee. He was then appointed as the chairman of Sri Lanka Cricket in January 2008. However, he was sacked from the position in December 2008 for taking controversial decisions regarding selection of players.

In January 2015, he contested for the position of the Vice President of Sri Lanka Cricket during the Sri Lanka Cricket.

== Controversies ==
=== Fitness ===
Ranatunga was known for controversially calling a runner during long innings due to his level of fitness and also he had reportedly twisted his ankle. After the second final of the One Day triangular series in Australia in the 1995/6 season, Ranatunga instructed his players not to shake the Australian players' hands. Australian wicketkeeper batsman Ian Healy who was initially not happy with Arjuna's decision to take a runner abused him by saying "You don't get a runner for being an overweight fat cunt". However, Healy denied reports of racially abusing Arjuna during that match.

=== Defence of Muralitharan ===
Ranatunga is also remembered for his stand in a One Day International against England. Australian Umpire Ross Emerson called Muttiah Muralitharan for throwing. (Muralitharan was subsequently cleared by bio-mechanical experts hired by the ICC.) Ranatunga exchanged heated words with umpire Emerson and led his team to a point just inside the boundary line, halting play and giving the impression that he was about to forfeit the match, until the Sri Lankan management conferred with him and play resumed. English captain, Alec Stewart, was openly critical of Ranatunga's behaviour. In a comment caught on the stump microphone he was heard to say to Ranatunga "Your conduct today has been appalling for a country's captain". The match was bad-tempered, with instances of shoulder-bumping.

=== Wrangles with Warne ===
There has always been a grudging mutual admiration between Shane Warne and Ranatunga. When the former visited Sri Lanka in the aftermath of the 2004 tsunami to aid Muralitharan in his "great work" there, he developed an amiable rapport with his long-time foe: "We even wagged," he confirmed later. Not long after, however, Ranatunga was lambasting him in a scathing newspaper attack. He also urged the ICC to ban Warne from participating at the 2003 Cricket World Cup after the latter had reportedly failed drugs test prior to the World Cup.

"You can't be mates with everyone," Warne wrote in his 2008 book Shane Warne's Century, serialised by The Times in September, "and if there was any way I could knock him down to number 101 for the purposes of this book, I'd be delighted to do so. But having taken on the task, I want to do it seriously, and the fact is that Ranatunga helped to put Sri Lanka on the cricket map. And you know what? Deep down, I'll quietly admit that I rated him as a cricketer."

Following Warne's death in 2022, Ranatunga wrote "...Shane and I had a very confrontational and competitive relationship on the field, but we also had immense mutual respect for each other."

=== Remarks on IPL ===
During the tenure as the chairman of Sri Lanka Cricket, he termed the Indian franchise T20 league Indian Premier League as "instant noodles" when it was introduced in 2008 and also blamed the IPL for causing severe financial losses to the cricket board due to the postponement of England's scheduled tour to Sri Lanka. He also urged all Sri Lankan players to refrain from taking part in the 2013 IPL season due to the fact that Sri Lankan players were banned from featuring in IPL matches in Chennai by the Government of Tamil Nadu.

=== 2018 political crisis ===
In October 2018, Arjuna who then served as the Petroleum minister was arrested by Sri Lanka Police following his alleged involvement in one of the turn of events as part of the 2018 Sri Lankan constitutional crisis.

=== Match fixing allegations ===
In July 2017, Ranatunga made a serious allegation that the 2011 Cricket World Cup Final match between India and Sri Lanka was fixed. He demanded a probe into the events at the final match. The erstwhile Sports Minister of Sri Lanka Mahindananda Aluthgamage also supported Ranatunga's allegations. However, three years later, Sri Lankan Police suspended the match fixing probe citing lack of sufficient evidence. Later, International Cricket Council rubbished the match fixing claims made by Ranatunga and Aluthgamage. In 2018, former Sri Lanka Cricket President Thilanga Sumathipala alleged both Arjuna and Aravinda de Silva to have involved in match fixing in 1994 and insisted that both of them had received money from Indian bookies. However, both Arjuna and Aravinda denied the allegations levelled by Sumathipala.

=== Criticism of Sri Lanka cricket ===
Arjuna Ranatunga has been a vocal critic of Sri Lanka Cricket administrators over the years especially after 2015 where Sri Lanka national cricket has suffered the worst decline at international cricket. He has blamed the cricket officials for not taking responsibility which has led to a significant downfall of Sri Lankan cricket and has repeatedly called for restructuring of the domestic structure in Sri Lanka which has been diluted with numerous clubs featuring in domestic first-class cricket competitions. He also slammed Sri Lanka Cricket for recruiting foreign coaches instead of grooming young talents and also termed the foreign coaches as "garbage".

In June 2021, he also criticised sports minister Namal Rajapaksa for failing to solve the issues in the cricket administration despite the fact that Namal had invited Arjuna to rectify the current state of Sri Lanka cricket and the loopholes in the system. In a television interview as of June 2021, he made a controversial statement that Sri Lanka cricket officials arranged the bilateral limited overs series against second string Indian side with the intention of gaining revenue through television marketing and also further insisted that arranging international series against second string India team has undermined dignity of the legacy of Sri Lanka cricket and therefore would insult the Sri Lankan cricket. In addition, he also made another controversial statement that he would give three slaps to the current crop of national cricketers in wake of the disciplinary violations regarding the breach of bio-secure bubble by three of the Sri Lankan cricketers during the limited overs series tour of England.

=== #MeToo allegations ===
In 2018, an Indian flight attendant accused Arjuna of harassing her at a hotel in Mumbai.

== Political career ==
He entered into politics by joining the Sri Lanka Freedom Party led by Chandrika Kumaratunga, and contested the 2001 parliamentary elections with PA from Colombo District. After the UPFA victory in 2004, he was appointed Deputy Minister of Industry, Tourism and Investment Promotion. In 2006, he resigned from the post of junior minister tourism in order to concentrate on Sri Lanka Cricket administration.

In 2010, Ranatunga left the UPFA and joined the Democratic Party of the DNA led by Sarath Fonseka, and was made the deputy leader of the Democratic Party. In November 2012, he resigned from the Democratic Party, but continued his affiliation with DNA. He endorsed Maithripala Sirisena in the 2015 Presidential election, and after Sirisena's victory Ranatunga was appointed Minister of Highways, Ports & Shipping. In 2020, he was deemed as a possible candidate to replace Ranil Wickremasinghe as the leader of the United National Party who had resigned from the position in wake of the defeat at the parliamentary elections. In October 2020, he resigned from the post of Gampaha District Leader.

On 30 November 2021, he resigned from the United National Party expressing his dissatisfaction over the lack of clarity about the future of the party and regarding the failed leadership of the party.

== Career highlights ==
Tests

- Ranatunga's highest Test batting score of 135 not out was made against Pakistan, Colombo, 1985–1986
- His best Test bowling effort of 2 for 17 came against New Zealand, Kandy, 1983–1984
- Ranatunga's captaincy record was as follows: 56 matches, 12 wins, 19 losses, 25 draws.

One-day Internationals

- He has the record for the most runs scored by any batsman in ODI history at number 5 position (4675 runs) and also the first to score over 4500 ODI runs when batting at no 5 position.

== International centuries ==
=== Key ===
Key	Meaning
*	Remained not out
Lost	The match was lost by Sri Lanka.
Won	The match was won by Sri Lanka.
Draw	The match was drawn.

=== Test centuries ===
Test centuries of Arjuna Ranatunga
No.	Score	Against	City	Ground	Date	Result	Ref
[1]	111	India	Colombo, Sri Lanka	Sinhalese Sports Club Ground	30 August 1985	Draw	
[2]	135*	Pakistan	Colombo, Sri Lanka	P Sara Oval	22 March 1986	Draw	
[3]	127	Australia	Colombo, Sri Lanka	Sinhalese Sports Club Ground	17 August 1992	Lost	
[4]	131	South Africa	Moratuwa, Sri Lanka	Tyronne Fernando Stadium	25 August 1995	Draw	

=== ODI centuries ===
ODI centuries of Arjuna Ranatunga
No.	Score	Against	City	Ground	Date	Result	Ref
[1]	101*	Pakistan	Durban, South Africa	Kingsmead Cricket Ground	2 December 1994	Lost	
[2]	102*	Pakistan	Gujranwala, Pakistan	Jinnah Stadium, Sialkot	29 September 1995	Lost	
[3]	131*	India	Colombo, Sri Lanka	R.Premadasa Stadium	18 July 1997	Won	
[4]	102	New Zealand	Colombo, Sri Lanka	Sinhalese Sports Club Ground	5 July 1998	Won	

== See also ==
- List of political families in Sri Lanka

== Notes ==
Preceded by Ranjan Madugalle	Sri Lankan Test and ODI Captain; 1988 -1999	Succeeded by Sanath Jayasuriya
