= Yohan Goonasekera =

Sri Lankan cricketer (born 1957)

Personal information
- Full name: Yohan Goonasekera
- Born: 8 November 1957 (age 69)
- Batting: Left-handed
- Bowling: Left-arm medium; Slow left-arm orthodox

International information
- National side: Sri Lanka (1983)
- Test debut (cap 18): 4 March 1983 v New Zealand
- Last Test: 11 March 1983 v New Zealand
- ODI debut (cap 31): 2 March 1983 v New Zealand
- Last ODI: 20 March 1983 v New Zealand

Career statistics
Competition	Test	ODI
Matches	2	3
Runs scored	48	69
Batting average	12.00	23.00
100s/50s	0/0	0/0
Top score	23	35
Balls bowled	–	36
Wickets	–	1
Bowling average	–	35.00
5 wickets in innings	–	0
10 wickets in match	–	0
Best bowling	–	1/24
Catches/stumpings	6/–	0/–
- Source: Cricinfo, 9 February 2006

Yohan Goonasekera (born 8 November 1957), is a Sri Lankan cricketer former who played in two Test matches and three One Day Internationals in 1983. He is an old boy of Nalanda College Colombo.
