= Marloes Fellinger =

Dutch softball player (born 1982)

Marloes Fellinger (born 18 April 1982 in Naarden) is a Dutch softball player, who represents the Dutch national team in international competitions.

Fellinger played softball for Run '71 Oldenzaal until 2002. Since then she plays for Sparks Haarlem. She is a third baseman and outfielder who bats and throws right-handed. In 2005 she was named MVP in the Dutch Softball Hoofdklasse and since 2006 she is competing in the Dutch national team. She is part of the Dutch team for the 2008 Summer Olympics in Beijing.
