= Sanjeeva Ranatunga =

Sri Lankan cricketer (born 1969)

Personal information
- Born: 25 April 1969 (age 57); Colombo, Sri Lanka
- Batting: Left-handed
- Bowling: Right-arm offbreak
- Relatives: Arjuna Ranatunga (brother); Nishantha Ranatunga (brother); Dammika Ranatunga (brother); Prasanna Ranatunga

International information
- National side: Sri Lanka (1994–1997)
- Test debut (cap 62): 26 August 1994 v Pakistan
- Last Test: 20 June 1998 v West Indies
- ODI debut (cap 81): 3 August 1993 v Pakistan
- Last ODI: 14 January 1996 v West Indies

Career statistics
Competition	Test	ODI
Matches	9	13
Runs scored	531	253
Batting average	33.18	23.00
100s/50s	2/2	0/2
Top score	118	70
Catches/stumpings	2/–	2/–
- Source: Cricinfo, 27 November 2016

Sanjeeva Ranatunga (born 25 April 1969) is a former Sri Lankan cricketer who played in 9 Test matches and 13 One Day Internationals from 1994 to 1997.

== Family ==
He is the brother of former Sri Lanka captain Arjuna Ranatunga, Dammika Ranatunga, Nishantha Ranatunga and Prasanna Ranatunga Ruwan Ranatunga.

== International career ==
He has scored 2 centuries in Tests; 118 and 100* against Zimbabwe in consecutive Tests at Harare Sports Club and Queens Sports Club in 1994. His other notable performances are a hard-fought 60 and 65 against Australia at Adelaide in 1996. His highest ODI score of 70 came against Pakistan at R. Premadasa Stadium, Colombo in 1994 which earned him the Man of the Match Award.
