= Bernard Perera =

Sri Lankan cricketer

Personal information
- Full name: Jayalathge Bernard Nihal Perera
- Born: 27 May 1956; Ceylon
- Died: 9 November 2012 (aged 56); Peradeniya, Sri Lanka
- Batting: Right-handed
- Bowling: Right-arm medium, right-arm off-spin

Career statistics
Competition	FC	List A
Matches	8	5
Runs scored	537	67
Batting average	38.35	16.75
100s/50s	1/4	0/0
Top score	102	31 not out
Balls bowled	531	42
Wickets	6	0
Bowling average	46.16	–
5 wickets in innings	0	–
10 wickets in match	0	–
Best bowling	2/48	–
Catches/stumpings	2/0	2/0
- Source: Cricinfo, 22 February 2017

Jayalathge Bernard Nihal Perera (27 May 1956 – 9 November 2012) was a Sri Lankan cricketer. He played eight first-class matches between 1980 and 1983.

Perera, a hard-hitting batsman, was twelfth man in Sri Lanka's first Test team, and shortly afterwards took part in Sri Lanka's first Test tour, to Pakistan in 1981–82, but he played none of the first-class matches on the tour.

Later in 1982 he toured South Africa with the Arosa Sri Lanka team. He was the team's highest scorer, with 450 runs in six first-class matches at an average of 40.90. He scored the team's only century, 102 in the second match against South Africa.

Along with the other members of the team he was banned from Sri Lankan cricket for making the unauthorized tour. After the ban was lifted several years later he coached the national women's team.
