= List of Sri Lanka ODI cricketers =

This is a list of Sri Lankan One Day International cricketers.

A One Day International, or ODI for short, is an international cricket match between two representative teams, each having ODI status, as determined by the International Cricket Council (ICC). An ODI differs from a Test match in that the number of overs per team is limited, and that each team has only one innings.

The list is arranged in the order in which each player won his first ODI cap. Where more than one player won his first ODI cap in the same match, those players are listed alphabetically by surname.

== Players ==
Statistics are correct as of 27 January 2026

Sri Lankan ODI cricketers				Batting					Bowling						Fielding	
Cap	Name	Career	Mat	Inn	NO	Runs	HS	Avg	Balls	Mdn	Runs	Wkt	Best	Avg	Ca	St
1	Somachandra de Silva	1975–1985	41	29	10	371	37*	19.52	2076	22	1557	32	3/29	48.65	5	–
2	Ranjit Fernando	1975	3	3	0	47	22	15.66	–	–	–	–	–	–	0	–
3	David Heyn	1975	2	2	0	3	2	1.50	–	–	–	–	–	–	1	–
4	Lalith Kaluperuma	1975–1982	4	3	3	33	14*	–	208	2	137	2	1/35	68.50	0	–
5	Duleep Mendis	1975–1989	79	74	9	1527	80	23.49	–	–	–	–	–	–	14	–
6	Tony Opatha	1975–1979	5	3	0	29	18	9.66	253	1	180	5	3/31	36.00	3	–
7	Mevan Pieris	1975	3	3	1	19	16	9.50	132	0	135	2	2/68	67.50	0	–
8	Anura Ranasinghe	1975–1982	9	8	1	153	51	21.85	324	3	281	2	1/21	140.50	0	–
9	Anura Tennekoon	1975–1979	4	4	0	137	59	34.25	–	–	–	–	–	–	3	–
10	Michael Tissera	1975	3	3	0	78	52	26.00	–	–	–	–	–	–	0	–
11	Bandula Warnapura	1975–1982	12	12	0	180	77	15.00	414	2	316	8	3/42	39.50	5	–
12	Sunil Wettimuny	1975–1979	3	3	1	136	67	68.00	–	–	–	–	–	–	0	–
13	Ajit de Silva	1975–1982	6	4	2	9	6*	4.50	305	3	262	9	3/41	29.11	2	–
14	Stanley de Silva	1979	2	1	0	10	10	10.00	120	2	54	2	2/36	27.00	1	–
15	Roy Dias	1979–1987	58	55	5	1573	121	31.46	56	0	70	3	3/25	23.33	16	–
16	Sunil Jayasinghe	1979	2	1	0	1	1	1.00	–	–	–	–	–	–	1	–
17	Sudath Pasqual	1979	2	2	1	24	23*	24.00	28	0	20	0	–	–	0	–
18	Ranjan Goonetilleke	1979	1	–	–	–	–	–	54	1	34	0	–	–	0	–
19	Ranjan Madugalle	1979–1988	63	56	5	950	73	18.62	4	0	1	0	–	–	18	–
20	Ashantha de Mel	1982–1987	57	41	9	466	36	14.56	2735	47	2237	59	5/32	37.91	13	–
21	Rohan Jayasekera	1982	2	1	0	17	17	17.00	–	–	–	–	–	–	0	–
22	Sidath Wettimuny	1982–1987	35	33	1	786	86*	24.56	57	0	70	1	1/13	70.00	3	–
23	Mahes Goonatilleke	1982	6	4	3	31	14*	31.00	–	–	–	–	–	–	0	4
24	Arjuna Ranatunga	1982–1999	269	255	47	7456	131*	35.84	4710	21	3757	79	4/14	47.55	63	–
25	Ravi Ratnayeke	1982–1990	78	69	14	824	50	14.98	3573	25	2866	85	4/23	33.71	14	–
26	Roger Wijesuriya	1982–1985	8	3	2	18	12*	18.00	312	1	287	8	2/25	35.87	2	–
27	Vinothen John	1982–1987	45	19	10	84	15	9.33	2311	44	1655	34	3/28	48.67	5	–
28	Rumesh Ratnayake	1982–1993	70	55	18	612	33*	16.54	3575	35	2712	76	5/32	35.68	11	–
29	Guy de Alwis	1983–1988	31	27	8	401	59*	21.10	–	–	–	–	–	–	27	3
30	Susil Fernando	1983	7	5	0	101	36	20.20	–	–	–	–	–	–	0	–
31	Yohan Goonasekera	1983	3	3	0	69	35	23.00	36	0	35	1	1/24	35.00	0	–
32	Mithra Wettimuny	1983	1	1	0	2	2	2.00	–	–	–	–	–	–	0	–
33	Sridharan Jeganathan	1983–1988	5	4	1	25	20*	8.33	276	2	208	5	2/45	41.60	1	–
34	Granville de Silva	1983–1985	4	2	1	9	7	9.00	194	1	169	0	–	–	0	–
35	Brendon Kuruppu	1983–1990	54	52	1	1022	72	20.03	–	–	–	–	–	–	30	8
36	Athula Samarasekera	1983–1994	39	39	2	844	76	22.81	338	3	291	0	–	–	5	–
37	Aravinda de Silva	1984–2003	308	296	30	9284	145	34.90	5148	27	4177	106	4/30	39.40	95	–
38	Uvais Karnain	1984–1990	19	17	5	229	41*	19.08	635	4	505	16	5/26	31.56	1	–
39	Amal Silva	1984–1985	20	20	0	441	85	22.05	–	–	–	–	–	–	17	3
40	Marlon Von Hagt	1985	1	1	0	8	8	8.00	–	–	–	–	–	–	0	–
41	Saliya Ahangama	1985	1	–	–	–	–	–	18	0	23	0	–	–	0	–
42	Asanka Gurusinha	1985–1996	147	143	5	3902	117*	28.27	1585	8	1354	26	2/25	52.07	49	–
43	Don Anurasiri	1986–1994	45	18	12	62	11	10.33	2100	14	1464	32	3/40	45.75	10	–
44	Ashley de Silva	1986–1993	4	2	0	12	8	6.00	–	–	–	–	–	–	4	2
45	Roshan Mahanama	1986–1999	213	198	23	5162	119*	29.49	2	0	7	0	–	–	109	–
46	Gamini Perera	1986	1	–	–	–	–	–	12	0	15	0	–	–	0	–
47	Keerthi Ranasinghe	1986	4	3	0	55	41	18.33	126	0	96	3	1/28	32.00	1	–
48	Kaushik Amalean	1986–1988	8	3	1	15	9	7.50	318	7	207	9	4/46	23.00	0	–
49	Champaka Ramanayake	1986–1995	62	35	14	210	26	10.00	2864	43	2049	68	4/17	30.13	11	–
50	Graeme Labrooy	1986–1992	44	36	7	249	33	8.58	2308	18	1876	45	5/57	41.68	8	–
51	Hashan Tillakaratne	1986–2003	200	168	40	3789	104	29.60	180	1	141	6	1/3	23.50	89	6
52	Asoka de Silva	1986–1992	28	20	6	138	19*	9.85	1374	8	967	17	3/38	56.88	6	–
53	Sanath Kaluperuma	1988	2	2	0	11	7	5.50	6	0	3	0	–	–	2	–
54	Ranjith Madurasinghe	1988–1992	12	6	4	21	8*	10.50	480	4	358	5	1/11	71.60	3	–
55	Kapila Wijegunawardene	1988–1992	26	12	5	20	8*	2.85	1186	8	986	25	4/49	39.44	3	–
56	Nilantha Ratnayake	1989–1990	2	–	–	–	–	–	101	0	98	2	1/39	49.00	0	–
57	Lalithamana Fernando	1989	1	1	0	8	8	8.00	18	0	16	1	1/16	16.00	0	–
58	Sanath Jayasuriya^{1}	1989–2011	441	429	18	13364	189	32.51	14748	45	11737	320	6/29	36.67	123	–
59	Marvan Atapattu	1990–2007	268	259	32	8529	132*	37.57	51	0	41	0	–	–	70	–
60	Dammika Ranatunga	1990	4	4	0	49	25	12.25	–	–	–	–	–	–	1	–
61	Romesh Kaluwitharana	1990–2004	189	181	14	3711	102*	22.22	–	–	–	–	–	–	132	75
62	Jayananda Warnaweera	1990–1993	6	3	3	1	1*	–	294	3	200	6	2/24	33.33	2	–
63	Charith Senanayake	1990–1991	7	7	0	126	27	18.00	–	–	–	–	–	–	2	–
64	Pramodya Wickramasinghe	1990–2002	134	64	24	344	32	8.60	5720	49	4321	109	4/48	39.64	26	–
65	Chandika Hathurusingha	1992–1999	35	33	1	669	66	20.90	954	9	709	14	4/57	50.64	6	–
66	Ruwan Kalpage	1992–1999	86	69	28	844	51	20.58	3960	20	2975	73	4/36	40.75	33	–
67	Dulip Liyanage	1992–2001	16	11	2	144	43	16.00	642	5	510	10	3/49	51.00	6	–
68	Gamini Wickremasinghe	1992–1993	4	1	0	2	2	2.00	–	–	–	–	–	–	2	4
69	Nishantha Ranatunga	1993	2	1	0	0	0	0.00	102	0	82	1	1/33	82.00	0	–
70	Muttiah Muralitharan^{2}	1993–2011	343	161	63	674	33*	6.87	18433	195	12066	523	7/30	23.07	128	–
71	Pubudu Dassanayake	1993–1994	16	10	2	85	20*	10.62	–	–	–	–	–	–	9	4
72	Hemantha Wickramaratne	1993	3	2	0	4	3	2.00	–	–	–	–	–	–	0	–
73	Dulip Samaraweera	1993–1994	5	4	0	91	49	22.75	–	–	–	–	–	–	3	–
74	Nisal Fernando	1994	2	2	2	22	20*	–	–	–	–	–	–	–	0	–
75	Chaminda Vaas^{1}	1994–2008	321	219	72	2018	50*	13.72	15721	278	10955	399	8/19	27.45	59	–
76	Aruna Gunawardene	1994	1	1	0	2	2	2.00	–	–	–	–	–	–	0	–
77	Ravindra Pushpakumara	1994–1999	31	9	5	36	14*	9.00	1430	12	1181	24	3/25	49.20	8	–
78	Upul Chandana	1994–2007	147	111	17	1627	89	17.30	6142	20	4818	151	5/61	31.90	79	–
79	Manjula Munasinghe	1994–1996	5	4	1	13	8	4.33	217	3	146	4	3/30	36.50	0	–
80	Ajith Weerakkody	1994	1	1	0	2	2	2.00	36	0	41	0	–	–	0	–
81	Sanjeeva Ranatunga	1994–1996	13	11	0	253	70	23.00	–	–	–	–	–	–	2	–
82	Kumar Dharmasena	1994–2004	141	87	33	1222	69*	22.62	7009	40	4998	138	4/37	36.21	34	–
83	Jayantha Silva	1995	1	1	1	1	1*	–	48	0	55	0	–	–	0	–
84	Janak Gamage	1995	4	2	2	8	7*	–	132	2	104	3	2/17	34.66	2	–
85	Chaminda Mendis	1995	1	1	1	3	3*	–	–	–	–	–	–	–	2	–
86	Chamara Dunusinghe	1995	1	1	0	1	1	1.00	–	–	–	–	–	–	1	1
87	Eric Upashantha	1995–2001	12	8	1	49	15	7.00	564	6	481	12	4/37	40.08	2	–
88	Sajeewa de Silva	1996–2000	38	19	13	39	13*	6.50	1619	10	1323	52	3/18	25.44	12	–
89	Nuwan Zoysa	1997–2007	95	47	21	343	47*	13.19	4259	61	3213	108	5/26	29.75	13	–
90	Lanka de Silva	1997	11	6	3	161	57	53.66	–	–	–	–	–	–	9	6
91	Russel Arnold	1997–2007	180	155	43	3950	103	35.26	2157	8	1739	40	3/47	43.47	48	–
92	Mahela Jayawardene^{1}	1998–2015	443	413	38	12381	144	33.01	579	1	544	8	2/56	68.00	212	–
93	Avishka Gunawardene	1998–2006	61	61	1	1708	132	28.46	–	–	–	–	–	–	13	–
94	Naveed Nawaz	1998–2002	3	3	1	31	15*	15.50	–	–	–	–	–	–	0	–
95	Suresh Perera	1998–2001	20	13	2	195	56*	17.72	579	2	522	13	2/25	40.15	4	–
96	Niroshan Bandaratilleke	1998	3	1	0	0	0	0.00	144	0	111	2	2/34	55.50	0	–
97	Thilan Samaraweera	1998–2011	53	42	11	862	105*	27.80	702	2	542	11	3/34	49.27	17	–
98	Ruchira Perera	1999–2007	19	7	2	8	4*	1.60	888	11	820	19	3/23	43.15	2	–
99	Hemantha Boteju	1999	2	2	1	3	2	3.00	102	1	113	0	–	–	1	–
100	Indika de Saram	1999–2001	15	13	2	183	38	16.63	–	–	–	–	–	–	9	–
101	Chamara Silva	1999–2011	75	62	7	1587	107*	28.85	42	1	33	1	1/21	33.00	20	–
102	Tillakaratne Dilshan	1999–2016	330	303	41	10290	161*	39.27	5880	22	4778	106	4/4	45.07	123	1
103	Indika Gallage	1999–2001	3	2	1	17	14	17.00	144	2	115	3	2/42	38.33	0	–
104	Kaushalya Weeraratne	2000–2008	15	9	1	160	41	20.00	480	6	385	6	3/46	64.16	3	–
105	Kumar Sangakkara^{2}	2000–2015	397	373	40	13975	169	41.96	–	–	–	–	–	–	396	96
106	Dilhara Fernando^{1}	2001–2012	146	61	35	239	20	9.19	6447	53	5612	183	6/27	30.66	27	–
107	Akalanka Ganegama	2001–2006	4	2	0	7	7	3.50	66	0	88	2	2/27	44.00	1	–
108	Charitha Buddhika	2001–2003	17	10	6	29	14*	7.25	700	7	586	15	5/67	39.06	3	–
109	Prabath Nissanka	2001–2003	23	13	5	53	11	6.62	997	6	857	27	4/12	31.74	3	–
110	Hasantha Fernando	2002–2006	7	5	3	43	23*	21.50	234	4	159	6	3/12	26.50	2	–
111	Chamila Gamage	2002–2003	7	2	1	7	4	7.00	300	2	254	8	2/34	31.75	0	–
112	Pulasthi Gunaratne	2002–2003	23	8	3	36	15*	7.20	959	6	908	27	4/44	33.62	3	–
113	Jehan Mubarak	2002–2013	40	37	6	704	72	22.70	129	0	95	2	1/10	47.50	12	–
114	Prasanna Jayawardene	2003–2007	6	5	0	27	20	5.40	–	–	–	–	–	–	4	1
115	Kaushal Lokuarachchi	2003–2007	21	18	3	210	69	14.00	1011	7	725	31	4/44	23.38	5	–
116	Dharshana Gamage	2003	3	2	1	3	2*	3.00	95	2	83	2	1/26	41.50	2	–
117	Dinusha Fernando	2003–2006	1	–	–	–	–	–	42	2	13	2	2/13	6.50	1	–
118	Nuwan Kulasekara	2003–2017	184	123	37	1327	73	15.43	8263	106	6751	199	5/22	33.92	46	–
119	Saman Jayantha	2004	17	17	2	400	74*	26.66	55	0	46	0	–	–	5	–
120	Rangana Herath	2004–2015	71	30	15	140	17*	9.33	3242	18	2362	74	4/20	31.91	14	–
121	Farveez Maharoof	2004–2016	109	75	18	1113	69*	19.52	4640	50	3789	135	6/14	28.06	26	–
122	Thilina Kandamby	2004–2010	39	36	6	870	93*	29.00	174	1	173	2	2/37	86.50	7	–
123	Lasith Malinga	2004–2019	226	119	36	567	56	6.83	10936	103	9760	338	6/38	28.87	31	–
124	Dilhara Lokuhettige	2005	8	8	0	77	29	9.62	282	3	221	6	2/30	36.83	3	–
125	Upul Tharanga^{1}	2005–2019	234	222	17	6941	174*	33.85	–	–	–	–	–	–	50	–
126	Pradeep Jayaprakashdaran	2005	1	–	–	–	–	–	36	1	21	1	1/21	21.00	0	–
127	Malinga Bandara	2006–2010	31	17	4	160	31	12.30	1470	3	1232	36	4/31	34.22	9	–
128	Michael Vandort	2006	1	1	0	48	48	48.00	–	–	–	–	–	–	0	–
129	Chamara Kapugedera	2006–2017	102	84	7	1624	95	21.09	264	0	225	2	1/24	112.50	31	–
130	Dhammika Prasad	2006–2015	24	12	6	129	31*	21.50	1015	4	976	32	3/17	30.50	1	–
131	Ishara Amerasinghe	2007–2008	8	4	4	6	5*	–	426	6	363	9	3/44	40.33	1	–
132	Malinda Warnapura	2007–2008	3	3	0	35	30	11.66	–	–	–	–	–	–	3	–
133	Dilruwan Perera	2007–2018	13	12	0	152	30	12.66	456	2	409	13	3/48	31.46	2	–
134	Ajantha Mendis	2008–2015	87	42	19	188	21*	8.17	4154	34	3324	152	6/13	21.86	15	–
135	Mahela Udawatte	2008	9	9	0	257	73	28.55	–	–	–	–	–	–	0	–
136	Thilan Thushara	2008–2010	38	27	6	392	54*	18.66	1676	17	1393	50	5/47	27.86	4	–
137	Angelo Mathews	2008–2023	226	195	48	5916	139*	40.24	5324	56	4110	126	6/20	32.61	53	–
138	Chanaka Welegedara	2009–2010	10	3	2	4	2*	4.00	457	5	433	15	5/66	28.86	2	–
139	Suraj Randiv	2009–2016	31	18	2	280	56	17.50	1437	5	1214	36	5/42	33.72	7	–
140	Suranga Lakmal	2009–2021	86	48	22	244	26	9.38	3881	36	3534	109	4/13	32.42	20	–
141	Thisara Perera	2009–2021	166	133	16	2338	140	19.98	5900	28	5740	175	6/44	32.80	62	–
142	Muthumudalige Pushpakumara	2009–2010	3	1	1	7	7*	–	30	0	21	0	–	–	0	–
143	Lahiru Thirimanne	2010–2019	127	106	14	3194	139*	34.71	104	0	94	3	2/36	31.33	38	–
144	Dinesh Chandimal	2010–2022	157	142	21	3854	111	31.85	–	–	–	–	–	–	62	8
145	Jeevan Mendis	2010–2019	58	44	10	636	72	18.70	1404	2	1204	28	3/15	43.00	13	–
146	Dimuth Karunaratne	2011–2023	50	46	4	1316	103	31.33	16	0	11	0	–	–	17	–
147	Shaminda Eranga	2011–2016	19	11	8	34	12*	11.33	716	4	686	21	3/46	32.66	5	–
148	Seekkuge Prasanna	2011–2019	40	37	3	421	95	12.38	1945	9	1767	32	3/32	55.21	7	–
149	Kosala Kulasekara	2011–2012	4	3	0	38	19	12.66	78	0	80	0	–	–	1	–
150	Sachithra Senanayake	2012–2015	49	33	11	290	42	13.18	2358	11	1874	53	4/13	35.35	19	–
151	Sajeewa Weerakoon	2012	2	–	–	–	–	–	60	0	49	1	1/49	49.00	0	–
152	Isuru Udana	2012–2021	21	18	4	237	78	16.92	909	2	950	18	3/82	52.77	6	–
153	Nuwan Pradeep	2012–2022	49	25	17	35	7	4.37	2345	20	2339	63	4/31	37.12	7	–
154	Akila Dananjaya	2012–2024	42	32	6	323	50*	12.42	2115	6	1809	59	6/29	30.66	14	–
155	Kusal Perera	2013–2023	116	111	5	3237	135	30.53	–	–	–	–	–	–	50	3
156	Angelo Perera	2013–2019	6	4	0	52	31	13.00	36	0	33	0	–	–	1	–
157	Ashan Priyanjan	2013–2015	23	20	2	420	74	23.33	265	1	233	5	2/11	46.60	7	–
158	Kithuruwan Vithanage	2013–2014	6	6	1	75	27	15.00	12	0	17	0	–	–	2	–
159	Chaturanga de Silva	2014–2017	7	7	1	94	44	15.66	316	2	256	5	2/29	51.20	4	–
160	Lahiru Gamage	2014–2017	9	5	3	4	3	2.00	402	3	392	9	4/57	43.55	2	–
161	Niroshan Dickwella	2014–2022	55	52	1	1604	116	31.45	–	–	–	–	–	–	41	11
162	Dushmantha Chameera	2015–2026	58	39	13	296	29	11.38	2490	18	2279	65	5/16	35.06	10	–
163	Tharindu Kaushal	2015	1	1	0	0	0	0.00	36	0	25	0	–	–	0	–
164	Milinda Siriwardana	2015–2019	27	24	1	516	66	22.43	601	2	547	9	2/27	60.77	6	–
165	Sachith Pathirana	2015–2017	18	14	1	332	56	25.53	765	2	720	15	3/37	48.00	4	–
166	Danushka Gunathilaka	2015–2022	47	46	1	1601	133	35.57	402	1	371	8	3/48	46.37	14	–
167	Shehan Jayasuriya	2015–2019	12	10	1	195	96	21.66	312	1	277	3	1/15	92.33	1	–
168	Jeffrey Vandersay	2015–2026	32	18	6	132	25	11.00	1425	6	1267	48	6/33	26.39	6	–
169	Dhananjaya de Silva	2016–2026	93	85	10	1924	93	25.65	2370	1	2011	48	3/32	41.89	42	–
170	Kusal Mendis	2016–2026	154	151	13	4890	143	35.43	20	0	28	0	–	–	100	16
171	Dasun Shanaka	2016–2024	71	63	5	1299	108*	22.39	1056	3	999	27	5/43	37.00	18	–
172	Chaminda Bandara	2016	1	1	1	1	1*	–	60	0	83	1	1/83	83.00	0	–
173	Amila Aponso	2016–2018	9	7	4	10	4	3.33	423	1	377	10	4/18	37.70	0	–
174	Lakshan Sandakan	2016–2021	31	19	7	64	16*	5.33	1488	3	1539	27	4/52	57.00	8	–
175	Avishka Fernando	2016–2025	51	50	0	1589	127	31.78	–	–	–	–	–	–	20	–
176	Asela Gunaratne	2016–2019	31	25	4	575	114*	27.38	834	3	723	22	3/10	32.86	10	–
177	Sandun Weerakkody	2017	3	3	0	73	58	24.33	–	–	–	–	–	–	2	–
178	Lahiru Kumara	2017–2025	32	19	8	62	10	5.63	1299	4	1404	42	4/48	33.42	6	–
179	Lahiru Madushanka	2017–2017	4	4	1	14	7	4.66	144	0	172	4	2/70	43.00	0	–
180	Wanindu Hasaranga	2017–2026	69	57	9	1135	80*	23.64	3245	26	2764	112	7/19	24.67	19	–
181	Asitha Fernando	2017–2026	30	10	6	7	3*	1.75	1214	6	1190	38	4/35	31.31	6	–
182	Vishwa Fernando	2017–2019	8	8	6	30	7*	15.00	297	4	337	5	1/35	67.40	0	–
183	Dilshan Munaweera	2017	2	2	0	15	11	7.50	–	–	–	–	–	–	2	–
184	Malinda Pushpakumara	2017	2	2	0	11	8	5.50	114	0	105	1	1/40	105.00	2	–
185	Sadeera Samarawickrama	2017–2025	55	50	5	1456	108	32.35	–	–	–	–	–	–	10	–
186	Shehan Madushanka	2018	1	1	0	7	7	7.00	37	1	26	3	3/26	8.66	0	–
187	Prabath Jayasuriya	2018	2	2	1	11	11*	11.00	96	0	95	0	–	–	0	–
188	Kasun Rajitha	2018–2023	34	19	7	117	33	9.75	1527	5	1553	43	4/50	36.11	5	–
189	Oshada Fernando	2019–2021	8	8	0	148	49	18.50	12	0	16	0	–	–	1	–
190	Kamindu Mendis	2019–2025	27	26	6	527	64	26.35	300	0	326	6	3/19	54.33	10	–
191	Priyamal Perera	2019	2	2	0	33	33	16.50	–	–	–	–	–	–	1	–
192	Minod Bhanuka	2019–2021	4	4	0	106	36	26.50	–	–	–	–	–	–	4	–
193	Ashen Bandara	2021–2023	6	5	1	141	55*	35.25	6	0	8	0	–	–	3	–
194	Pathum Nissanka	2021–2026	77	77	5	2920	210*	40.55	–	–	–	–	–	–	24	–
195	Binura Fernando	2021	3	3	0	26	17	8.66	152	0	136	2	1/33	68.00	1	–
196	Chamika Karunaratne	2021–2023	26	24	6	451	75	25.05	797	4	765	24	4/43	31.87	6	–
197	Ramesh Mendis	2021–2022	4	4	2	50	26	25.00	72	0	74	4	2/26	18.50	1	–
198	Charith Asalanka	2021–2026	83	75	10	2734	128	42.06	767	4	640	18	4/18	35.55	21	–
199	Praveen Jayawickrama	2021	5	3	2	7	4	7.00	198	0	177	5	3/59	35.40	0	–
200	Dhananjaya Lakshan	2021–2022	3	2	0	4	2	2.00	66	0	76	1	1/43	76.00	1	–
201	Bhanuka Rajapaksa	2021	3	3	0	89	65	29.66	-	-	-	-	-	-	0	-
202	Maheesh Theekshana	2021–2025	59	33	12	344	38*	16.38	2889	19	2215	79	4/25	28.03	13	–
203	Chamika Gunasekara	2022	1	–	–	–	–	–	6	0	8	0	–	–	0	–
204	Dunith Wellalage	2022–2026	34	27	6	453	67*	21.57	1499	3	1275	41	5/27	31.09	14	–
205	Pramod Madushan	2022–2026	13	9	2	53	15	7.57	522	1	603	16	4/75	37.68	4	–
206	Dilshan Madushanka	2023–2025	28	11	8	36	19	12.00	1224	11	1251	50	5/80	25.02	6	–
207	Nuwanidu Fernando	2023–2025	6	5	0	89	50	17.80	12	0	22	0	–	–	0	–
208	Dushan Hemantha	2023–2023	5	4	2	39	22	19.50	210	0	193	2	2/49	96.50	1	–
209	Matheesha Pathirana	2023–2023	12	7	2	11	5	2.20	508	2	616	17	4/32	36.23	2	–
210	Sahan Arachchige	2023–2024	5	3	0	89	57	29.66	42	0	28	1	1/18	28.00	2	–
211	Janith Liyanage	2024–2026	34	29	6	990	101*	43.04	392	3	351	3	1/16	117.00	7	–
212	Shevon Daniel	2024	1	1	0	12	12	12.00	–	–	–	–	–	–	0	–
213	Mohamed Shiraz	2024	2	1	1	1	1*	–	54	1	48	1	1/23	48.00	0	–
214	Nishan Madushka	2024–2025	8	7	0	182	69	26.00	0	0	0	0	–	–	3	–
215	Chamindu Wickramasinghe	2024	4	3	0	58	22	19.33	56	0	66	1	1/28	66.00	2	–
216	Eshan Malinga	2025	7	6	3	14	4	4.66	222	1	223	4	3/35	55.75	2	–
217	Milan Rathnayake	2025	1	1	0	22	22	22.00	6	0	10	0	–	–	0	–
218	Kamil Mishara	2025–2026	6	6	0	148	38	24.66	6	0	9	0	–	–	0	–
219	Pavan Rathnayake	2025–2026	4	4	0	194	121	48.50	6	0	12	0	–	–	0	–

Notes:

- ^{1} Sanath Jayasuriya, Chaminda Vaas, Mahela Jayawardene, Dilhara Fernando and Upul Tharanga also played ODI cricket for Asia XI. Only their records for Sri Lanka are given above.
- ^{2} Muttiah Muralitharan and Kumar Sangakkara also played ODI cricket for Asia XI and World XI. Only their records for Sri Lanka are given above.

== See also ==
- Sri Lanka national cricket team
