= Sri Lankan cricket team in England in 1981 =

The Sri Lanka national cricket team toured England in the 1981 season and played thirteen first-class matches, mostly against county teams. The Sri Lankans also played two one-day matches and finished their tour with a visit to the Netherlands where they played two minor games. During the tour Sri Lanka was awarded Test cricket status by the International Cricket Council (ICC) and played their inaugural Test match the following year.
