= Lalith Kaluperuma =

Sri Lankan cricketer

Personal information
- Full name: Lalith Wasantha Silva Kaluperuma
- Born: 25 June 1949 (age 77); Colombo, Sri Lanka
- Batting: Right-handed
- Bowling: Right-arm off break
- Relatives: Sanath Kaluperuma (brother)

International information
- National side: Sri Lanka (1975–1982)
- Test debut (cap 6): 17 February 1982 v England
- Last Test: 14 March 1982 v Pakistan
- ODI debut (cap 4): 7 June 1975 v West Indies
- Last ODI: 13 February 1982 v England

Career statistics
Competition	Test	ODI	FC
Matches	2	4	57
Runs scored	12	33	1,023
Batting average	4.00	–	17.33
100s/50s	0/0	0/0	0/3
Top score	11*	14*	96
Balls bowled	162	208	9,372
Wickets	0	2	129
Bowling average	–	68.50	30.47
5 wickets in innings	–	0	7
10 wickets in match	–	0	1
Best bowling	–	1/35	8/43
Catches/stumpings	2/–	0/–	48/–
- Source: Cricinfo, 22 July 2014

Lalith Wasantha Silva Kaluperuma (born 25 June 1949) is a former Sri Lankan international cricketer, who played first-class cricket from 1970 to 1983. He played in Sri Lanka's first Test team in 1982.

== Cricket career ==
Kaluperuma was educated at Kalutara Vidyalaya and Nalanda College, Colombo. He played for Bloomfield in Sri Lankan domestic cricket. An off-spin bowler, useful lower-order batsman and fine fieldsman in the gully, he was a regular member of the Sri Lankan team throughout the 1970s. When Sri Lanka toured Pakistan in 1973-74 he took 8 for 50 in the first innings of the match against the North West Frontier Province Governor's XI. In the Gopalan Trophy match in 1975-76 he took 2 for 36 and 8 for 43 to give Sri Lanka victory by 22 runs.

Kaluperuma played in the first World Cup in 1975, and also toured India in 1975-76 and England in 1981 with the Sri Lankan team. When Pakistan played two unofficial Tests in Sri Lanka in 1975-76 he played a significant role in Sri Lanka's victory in the first match, scoring 96 and 50 not out, and taking three wickets in the second innings. He took eight wickets in the match when the Australians played Sri Lanka in a four-day match in 1981. A few days earlier, in a 45-over match, he had taken 4 for 35 when Sri Lanka beat Australia for the first time.

Kaluperuma played in Sri Lanka's inaugural Test against England at Colombo in 1981–82. However, he bowled 21 wicketless overs, followed by six wicketless overs in the next Test. It appeared that the captain, Duleep Mendis, had little faith in him, and he never returned to international cricket. Shortly afterwards, he joined an unofficial Sri Lankan tour of South Africa in 1982–83, which led to a ban from international cricket and cricket in Sri Lanka. In the first of the two unofficial Tests he took 5 for 123 in South Africa's only innings, which were the Sri Lankan team's best figures of the tour.

== Later career ==
In 2003, Kaluperuma joined the board of national selectors in Sri Lanka, and two years later he was made chairman of the board.
