= Gamini Wickremasinghe =

Sri Lankan cricketer (born 1965)

Personal information
- Full name: Anguppulige Gamini Dayantha Wickremasinghe
- Born: 27 December 1965 (age 60); Colombo, Sri Lanka
- Batting: Right-handed
- Bowling: Wicket-keeper

International information
- National side: Sri Lanka (1989–1992)
- Test debut (cap 44): 8 December 1989 v Australia
- Last Test: 6 December 1992 v New Zealand
- ODI debut (cap 68): 4 December 1992 v New Zealand
- Last ODI: 2 February 1993 v Pakistan

Career statistics
| Competition | Test | ODI |
|---|---|---|
| Matches | 3 | 4 |
| Runs scored | 17 | 2 |
| Batting average | 8.50 | 2.00 |
| 100s/50s | 0/0 | 0/0 |
| Top score | 13* | 2 |
| Catches/stumpings | 9/1 | 2/4 |
- Source: Cricinfo, 1 May 2006

Anguppulige Gamini Dayantha Wickremasinghe (born 27 December 1965), or Gamini Wickremasinghe, is a former Sri Lankan cricketer who played three Test matches and four One Day International between 1989 and 1993. He was born in Colombo and studied at Nalanda College Colombo.

== Selection committee ==
On 15 September 2017, Wickremasinghe was appointed as one of the selectors of the Sri Lanka national cricket team. He along with former selector, Asanka Gurusinha and three new persons included former national team manager Jeryl Woutersz, and former domestic Sri Lankan cricketer, Sajith Fernando was appointed to the committee with the chief selector Graeme Labrooy.
