= Gamini Perera =

Sri Lankan cricketer (born 1964)

Personal information
- Full name: Kahawalage Gamini Perera
- Born: 22 May 1964 (age 62); Colombo, Sri Lanka
- Batting: Right-handed
- Bowling: Slow left-arm orthodox

International information
- National side: Sri Lanka
- Only ODI (cap 46): 2 March 1986 v Pakistan

Career statistics
Competition	ODI
Matches	1
Runs scored	–
Batting average	–
100s/50s	–
Top score	–
Balls bowled	12
Wickets	0
Bowling average	–
5 wickets in innings	–
10 wickets in match	–
Best bowling	–
Catches/stumpings	0/–
- Source: Cricinfo, 1 May 2016

Kahawalage Gamini Perera (born 22 May 1964) is a Sri Lankan former cricketer who played one One Day International in 1986.
