= Ajit de Silva =

Sri Lankan cricketer (born 1952)

Personal information
- Full name: Ginigalgodage Ramba Ajit de Silva
- Born: 12 December 1952 (age 73); Ambalangoda, Sri Lanka
- Batting: Left-handed
- Bowling: Slow left-arm orthodox

International information
- National side: Sri Lanka (1975–1982)
- Test debut (cap 3): 17 February 1982 v England
- Last Test: 17 September 1982 v India
- ODI debut (cap 13): 14 June 1975 v Pakistan
- Last ODI: 15 September 1982 v India

Career statistics
Competition	Test	ODI	FC	LA
Matches	4	6	53	15
Runs scored	41	9	317	20
Batting average	8.19	4.50	7.73	5.00
100s/50s	0/0	0/0	0/1	0/0
Top score	14	6*	75	10 *
Balls bowled	962	305	11,736	822
Wickets	7	9	161	19
Bowling average	55.00	29.11	27.44	27.21
5 wickets in innings	0	0	4	0
10 wickets in match	0	0	0	0
Best bowling	2/38	3/41	6/30	3/41
Catches/stumpings	0/0	2/0	21/0	0/0
- Source: ESPNcricinfo, 19 June 2020

Ginigalgodage Ramba Ajit de Silva (born 12 December 1952), or Ajit de Silva, is a former Sri Lankan international cricketer, who played four Test matches and six One Day Internationals for Sri Lanka, bowling accurate slow left arm spin.

== International career ==
He proved an important member of the national squad for several years until 1982/83, when he toured with the rebel Arosa Sri Lanka team to South Africa. Due to this, he was excluded from world cricket, along with the rest of the players on that tour. This effectively finished his first-class career, beginning in November 1973, in which he claimed 161 wickets (av 27.44).

He played a crucial part in Sri Lanka's first ODI victory on home soil – against England in 1982. Sri Lanka had batted first, setting England 216 to win, and Graham Gooch and Geoff Cook had set a good platform as the score moved to 109 for no loss. However, de Silva removed both openers (stumped by Mahes Goonatilleke), four players were run out, and England lost by three runs.

In 1982 de Silva joined a "Rebel tour" to Apartheid-era South Africa. In the series the "AROSA" Sri Lankans were soundly beaten. de Silva himself struggled with stress and had a breakdown on tour. He was given a 25-year ban by the Sri Lankan cricket authorities for participating in the rebel tour which was a breach of the boycott of South Africa by global sporting bodies.
