= Sanath Kaluperuma =

Sri Lankan cricketer (born 1961)

Sanath Kaluperuma සනත් කලුපෙරුම
Personal information
- Full name: Sanath Mohan Silva Kaluperuma
- Born: 22 October 1961 (age 65); Colombo, Sri Lanka
- Batting: Right-handed
- Bowling: Right-arm off-break
- Relatives: Lalith Kaluperuma (brother)

International information
- National side: Sri Lanka (1984–1988)
- Test debut (cap 132): 9 March 1984 v New Zealand
- Last Test: 12 February 1988 v Australia
- ODI debut (cap 53): 19 January 1988 v Australia
- Last ODI: 29 March 1988 v New Zealand

Career statistics
Competition	Test	ODI
Matches	4	2
Runs scored	88	11
Batting average	11.00	5.50
100s/50s	0/0	0/0
Top score	23	7
Balls bowled	240	6
Wickets	2	0
Bowling average	62.00	–
5 wickets in innings	0	0
10 wickets in match	0	–
Best bowling	2/17	–
Catches/stumpings	6/–	2/–
- Source: Cricinfo, 9 February 2017

Sanath Mohan Silva Kaluperuma (born 22 October 1961) is a former Sri Lankan cricketer who played in four Tests and two ODIs from 1984 to 1988.

== Life and career ==
Born in Colombo, Kaluperuma studied at Nalanda College Colombo and represented Bloomfield Cricket and Athletic Club. A top-order batsman who could open and a handy off-spin bowler, he was also a skilled slip (gully) fielder.

Kaluperuma migrated to Melbourne, Australia, in 1989 where he played district cricket and later captain-coached the Mount Waverley, Cheltenham and Keysborough clubs.

His elder brother, Lalith Kaluperuma, represented Sri Lanka in their inaugural Test matches.
