= Nishantha Ranatunga =

Sri Lankan cricketer

Personal information
- Born: 22 January 1966 (age 60); Gampaha, Ceylon now Sri Lanka
- Batting: Right-handed
- Bowling: Right-arm medium-fast
- Relatives: Arjuna Ranatunga (brother); Sanjeeva Ranatunga (brother); Dammika Ranatunga (brother); Prasanna Ranatunga (brother)

International information
- National side: Sri Lanka
- ODI debut (cap 69): 3 February 1993 v Zimbabwe
- Last ODI: 4 February 1993 v Pakistan

Domestic team information
- Years: Team
- 1988/89–1989: Sinhalese Sports Club
- 1989/90: Moratuwa Sports Club
- 1989/90–1993/94: Colts Cricket Club

Career statistics
Competition	ODI	FC
Matches	2	92
Runs scored	0	3,078
Batting average	0.00	29.03
100s/50s	0/0	3/18
Top score	0	212*
Balls bowled	102	9,773
Wickets	1	217
Bowling average	82.00	22.12
5 wickets in innings	0	10
10 wickets in match	0	1
Best bowling	1/33	7/22
Catches/stumpings	0/–	49/–
- Source: Cricinfo, 26 November 2015

Nishantha Ranatunga (born 22 January 1966) is a former Sri Lankan cricketer who played two One Day Internationals in 1993. An all-rounder of note in domestic cricket, he is the brother of former Sri Lanka captain Arjuna Ranatunga, Sanjeeva Ranatunga, Dammika Ranatunga and Prasanna Ranatunga.

== After cricket ==
Ranatunga was the former honorable secretary of Sri Lanka Cricket, the governing body of cricket in Sri Lanka.

He also served as the secretary of the government-appointed interim-committee that was in charge of the cricket board when stadiums were built and renovated for the ICC Cricket World Cup 2011.

Ranatunga was previously appointed by the UPFA government as the director general of the state-owned Sri Lanka Rupavahini Corporation.

In January, 2012, he was elected uncontested as the secretary of the cricket board.

There has been a lot of controversy over Ranatunga's role as CEO of a television channel, which is owned by president Mahinda Rajapaksa's family, that the cricket board awarded broadcast rights to. Critics say that Ranatunga's role as the CEO of Carlton Sports Network while being the secretary at Sri Lanka Cricket is a conflict of interest.

He served as the Chairman of National Water Supply and Drainage Board from December 2019, until he was dismissed in 2026, over corruption allegations.
