= Dammika Ranatunga =

Sri Lankan cricketer (born 1962)

Personal information
- Born: 12 October 1962 (age 64)
- Batting: Right-handed
- Bowling: Right-arm offbreak
- Relatives: Arjuna Ranatunga (brother); Nishantha Ranatunga (brother); Sanjeeva Ranatunga (brother); Prasanna Ranatunga(brother); Ruwan Ranatunga(brother)

International information
- National side: Sri Lanka (1989–1990)
- Test debut (cap 43): 8 December 1989 v Australia
- Last Test: 16 December 1989 v Australia
- ODI debut (cap 60): 5 December 1990 v India
- Last ODI: 21 December 1990 v Pakistan

Career statistics
Competition	Test	ODI
Matches	2	4
Runs scored	87	49
Batting average	29.00	12.25
100s/50s	0/0	0/0
Top score	45	25
Catches/stumpings	0/–	1/–
- Source: Cricinfo, 27 November 2016

Dammika Ranatunga (born 12 October 1962) is a former Sri Lankan cricketer who played in two Test matches and four One Day Internationals in 1989.

He is the eldest brother of former Sri Lanka captain Arjuna Ranatunga, Sanjeeva Ranatunga, Nishantha Ranatunga, Prasanna Ranatunga and Ruwan Ranatunga.

In 2015, Ranatunga was appointed by Arjuna Ranatunga as the Chairman of the Sri Lanka Ports Authority (SLPA).
