= Asanka Gurusinha =

Sri Lankan cricketer (born 1966)

Deshabandu Asanka Gurusinha
Personal information
- Full name: Asanka Pradeep Gurusinha
- Born: 16 September 1966 (age 60); Colombo, Sri Lanka
- Batting: Left-handed
- Bowling: Right-arm medium

International information
- National side: Sri Lanka (1985–1996)
- Test debut (cap 32): 7 November 1985 v Pakistan
- Last Test: 18 September 1996 v Zimbabwe
- ODI debut (cap 42): 3 November 1985 v Pakistan
- Last ODI: 8 November 1996 v Pakistan

Domestic team information
- Years: Team
- Nondescripts Cricket Club

Head coaching information
- Years: Team
- 2020–2022: Nigeria

Career statistics
Competition	Test	ODI	FC	LA
Matches	41	147	124	173
Runs scored	2,452	3,902	7,169	4,365
Batting average	38.92	28.27	43.71	26.77
100s/50s	7/8	2/22	20/32	2/23
Top score	143	117*	162	117*
Balls bowled	234	264	5,142	2,035
Wickets	20	26	107	39
Bowling average	34.04	52.07	21.47	42.97
5 wickets in innings	0	0	1	0
10 wickets in match	0	0	0	0
Best bowling	4/68	2/25	5/54	3/36
Catches/stumpings	33/–	49/–	89/–	56/–
Medal record
Men's Cricket
Representing Sri Lanka
ICC Cricket World Cup
Winner	1996 India-Pakistan-Sri Lanka
- Source: Cricinfo, 25 February 2015

Deshabandu Asanka Pradeep Gurusinha (Sinhala: අසංක ප්‍රදීප් ගුරුසිංහ, [asaŋkə prədiːp gurusiŋɦə]; born 16 September 1966) is a Sri Lankan Australian former international cricketer who had an 11-year international career, playing 41 Tests and 147 One Day Internationals for Sri Lanka. He was a key member for 1996 Cricket World Cup winning team for Sri Lanka, who is a specialist batsman helped to win the final with 65 in a partnership of 125 with the final's Man of the Match, Aravinda de Silva.

He was educated at Isipathana College, Colombo & Nalanda College Colombo and had been residing in Melbourne. He was formerly the manager of the Sri Lanka national cricket team and a member of the selection committee. In December 2020, he was appointed as head coach of Nigeria national cricket team. In 2022 he was announced as the senior coach of Victorian Premier Cricket club Essendon.

== Domestic career ==
As a school boy, once he scored a hundred for his team at Isipathana College along with fellow cricketer Hashan Tillakaratne. Gurusinha played domestic cricket for Nondescripts Cricket Club. He was able to engage with many international teams coming to Sri Lanka for tours and threw balls in their practice matches.

== International career ==
Gurusinha was called up at 19 as a wicket-keeper, a role he took in a further two ODIs and one Test. Gurusinha was the 32nd Sri Lankan Test cap, making his debut against Pakistan in Karachi in 1985/86. He was also a useful part-time bowler, with Michael Atherton, Sunil Gavaskar, Dean Jones, Steve Waugh and Inzamam-ul-Haq among his 20 Test wickets. He gradually established himself as a No. 3 batsman, playing 33 Tests and 109 ODIs in that position, and was described by Simon Wilde of Cricinfo as "the rock on which Sri Lankan batting was founded". He was also known for his big stature and wide stance when batting.

During the 1992–93 season, Sri Lanka received many international sides. In the first test against Australia, Gurusinha scored his fourth Test century with 137 runs in Sinhalese Sports Club Ground. In the match, Romesh Kaluwitharana and captain Arjuna Ranatunga also made centuries, the first time where three Sri Lankan batsmen scored centuries in the same innings. In the meantime, the total went pass 500 for the first time in Sri Lankan cricket history. He batted for nine hours and built a partnership of 230 with Ranatunga, then second-highest partnership for any wicket for Sri Lanka. However, Sri Lanka finally lost the match.

His application at the crisis situations to drag the team scorecard was a major highlight for those who watched the World Series tournament back in 1996. Gurusinha was one of the main pillars of Sri Lanka's 1996 World Cup winning batting line up. He retired from the format after the match against Pakistan on 8 November 1996.

He was the first Sri Lankan to score a Test century at Seddon Park.

== Coaching career ==
He is a Level 3 certified Cricket Coach, and was also the Consultant Regional Cricket Coach for Cricket Australia. Gurusinha was appointed as the Manager for the National Cricket Team of Sri Lanka in 2017. However, with consecutive defeats to India in all formats, Gurusinha along with the selection committee resigned from their positions on 29 August 2017. The resignation did not last for a week, where on 19 September 2017, Gurusinha was re-appointed as the selector, along with three new selectors – Graeme Labrooy, Jeryl Woutersz, Gamini Wickremasinghe, and Sajith Fernando.

In December 2020, he was appointed as head coach of Nigeria national cricket team. He resigned in April 2022.

== International centuries ==
=== Key ===
Key	Meaning
*	Remained not out
Lost	The match was lost by Sri Lanka.
Won	The match was won by Sri Lanka.
Draw	The match was drawn.

=== Test centuries ===
Test centuries of Asanka Gurusinha
No.	Score	Against	City	Ground	Date	Result	Ref
[1]	116*	Pakistan	Colombo, Sri Lanka	P Sara Oval Stadium	22 March 1986	Draw	
[2]	119	New Zealand	Hamilton, New Zealand	Seddon Park	22 February 1991	Draw	
[3]	102	New Zealand	Hamilton, New Zealand	Seddon Park	22 February 1991	Draw	
[4]	137	Australia	Colombo, Sri Lanka	Sinhalese Sports Club Ground	17 August 1992	Lost	
[5]	128	Zimbabwe	Harare, Zimbabwe	Harare Sports Club	11 October 1994	Draw	
[6]	127	New Zealand	Dunedin, New Zealand	Carisbrook Stadium	18 March 1995	Draw	
[7]	143	Australia	Melbourne, Australia	Melbourne Cricket Ground	26 December 1995	Lost	

=== ODI centuries ===
ODI centuries of Asanka Gurusinha
No.	Score	Against	City	Ground	Date	Result	Ref
[1]	117*	New Zealand	Sharjah, UAE	Sharjah Cricket Stadium	18 April 1994	Lost	
[2]	108	New Zealand	Auckland	Eden Park	1 April 1995	Won	
