= Herbi Felsinger =

Sri Lankan cricket umpire (1934–2018)

Personal information
- Full name: Herbert Clemen Felsinger
- Born: 4 June 1934; Borella, Sri Lanka
- Died: 29 April 2018 (aged 83)
- Relatives: Alane Felsinger (brother)

Umpiring information
- Tests umpired: 6 (1982–1986)
- ODIs umpired: 11 (1982–1986)
- Source: Cricinfo, 7 June 2019

Herbi Felsinger (4 June 1934 – 29 April 2018) was a Sri Lankan cricket umpire. The 17 international fixtures he officiated in included six Test matches between 1982 and 1986 and eleven One Day Internationals between 1982 and 1986. He also stood in Sri Lanka's first Test match in February 1982.

== See also ==
- List of Test cricket umpires
- List of One Day International cricket umpires
