= Ashantha de Mel =

Sri Lankan cricketer

Personal information
- Full name: Ashantha Lakdasa Francis de Mel
- Born: 9 May 1959 (age 67); Colombo
- Batting: Right-handed
- Bowling: Right-arm medium-fast

International information
- National side: Sri Lanka (1982–1987)
- Test debut (cap 1): 17 February 1982 v England
- Last Test: 17 December 1986 v India
- ODI debut (cap 20): 13 February 1982 v England
- Last ODI: 30 October 1987 v England

Career statistics
Competition	Test	ODI	FC	LA
Matches	17	57	42	70
Runs scored	326	466	918	577
Batting average	14.17	14.56	19.12	15.18
100s/50s	0/0	0/0	1/2	0/0
Top score	34	36	100*	39*
Balls bowled	3,518	2,735	7,056	3,347
Wickets	59	59	109	69
Bowling average	36.94	37.91	37.90	37.23
5 wickets in innings	3	2	3	2
10 wickets in match	0	0	0	0
Best bowling	6/109	5/32	6/109	5/32
Catches/stumpings	9/–	13/–	22/–	15/–
- Source: ESPNcricinfo, 31 July 2015

Ashantha Lakdasa Francis de Mel (born 9 May 1959) is a former Sri Lankan Test and ODI cricketer and selector for the national team. He bowled Sri Lanka's first ball in a Test match. He was one of few Sri Lanka bowlers in the 1980s above medium pace, and he was also said to have the ability to get the ball to swing out.

In November 2018, he was named as the chairman of Sri Lanka Cricket's National Selection Panel. He previously served in the role in 2012.

== International career ==
He only played one Test match outside the Indian subcontinent, which may explain why his Test average is so high, as conditions there are generally not thought suitable for swing bowlers. He often made small contributions with the bat, and only made ducks three times.

He was educated at Isipathana College, Colombo, up to ordinary level and then moved to Royal College Colombo.

=== 1983 cricket World Cup ===
His finest moment as a bowler arguably came at the 1983 World Cup in England, where he used the helpful conditions to register his two only ODI five-wicket-hauls. First, at Headingley against Pakistan, he took five for 39, but got little help from his teammates and couldn't quite carry the team to the target, being last out as Sri Lanka needed 12 more to win off 10 balls. Two days later, however, they moved to The County Ground, Derby, and de Mel once again took five wickets – this time for only 32 runs, as New Zealand crumbled to 181 and Sri Lanka won by three wickets, their only win in the tournament. de Mel returned Sri Lanka's best bowling figures in every match. He was the tournament's second highest wicket taker with 17 wickets, one behind India's Roger Binny. Many years later, it was discovered that one of the wickets credited to Rumesh Ratnayake in Sri Lanka's first round match against England was actually taken by de Mel, but the scorecards still don't reflect that.

=== 1985 against India ===
After this, he usually put in solid performances, but the closest he came to the 1983 heroics was in a 1985 Test with India. The visitors had chosen to bat, but de Mel ran through the middle order, getting players like Ravi Shastri, Kapil Dev and Dilip Vengsarkar out, and finishing with five for 64. Sri Lanka led by 129 runs on first innings, but de Mel failed to take a wicket in the second innings as India drew the match.

=== After cricket ===
His career was ended in 1987 due to a knee injury, but he continued within the Sri Lankan cricket system, and in May 2004 he was appointed head of selectors in Sri Lanka. That lasted for one year, whereupon he was sacked, only one month after the sports minister Jeewan Kumaranatunga had announced that he would be retained for another year. de Mel has also played bridge, appearing in the Commonwealth Nations Bridge Championships playing this sport.

De Mel went on to become the chairman of the Selection Committee, Sri Lanka Cricket (SLC) which was responsible for selecting players for matches and tours. He was also the chairman of the state owned Ceylon Petroleum Corporation.
