= Sajith Fernando =

Sri Lankan cricketer (born 1972)

Personal information
- Full name: Sajith Ian Fernando
- Born: 27 September 1972 (age 54); Kandy, Sri Lanka
- Batting: Left-handed
- Bowling: Right-arm offbreak
- Role: Allrounder

Domestic team information
- Years: Team
- Colts
- Middleton CC
- Tamil Union

Career statistics
Competition	FC	LA	T20
Matches	193	108	6
Runs scored	10,700	2,920	152
Batting average	38.62	31.06	25.33
100s/50s	16/53	4/15	0/0
Top score	178*	118	41
Balls bowled	14,763	3,465	126
Wickets	269	83	4
Bowling average	23.78	27.44	36.75
5 wickets in innings	8	0	0
10 wickets in match	2	0	0
Best bowling	7/37	4/15	2/15
Catches/stumpings	120/0	29/0	1/0
- Source: Cricinfo, 19 September 2017

Sajith Fernando (born 27 September 1972) is a Sri Lankan former first-class cricketer who played 193 matches between 1993 and 2012, scoring more than 10,000 runs. He is a former student of St. Anthony's College, Kandy.

On 15 September 2017, Fernando was appointed as one of the selectors for selection committee for the Sri Lanka national cricket team.
