= Ruwan Ranatunga =

Sri Lankan politician (born 1971)

Ruwan Ranatunga (born 20 October 1971) is a Sri Lankan politician, a member of the Parliament of Sri Lanka. He belongs to the Sri Lanka Freedom Party.
