= History of the Sri Lanka national cricket team =

The History of the Sri Lanka national cricket team began with the formation of the Colombo Cricket Club in 1832. By the 1880s a national team, the Ceylon national cricket team, was formed which began playing first-class cricket by the 1920s. The Ceylon national cricket team had achieved associate member status of the International Cricket Council in 1965. Renamed Sri Lanka in 1972, the national team first competed in top level international cricket in 1975, when they played against West Indies during 1975 Cricket World Cup; West Indies won the match by 9 wickets at Old Trafford, Manchester, England.

After Sri Lanka awarded Test status on 21 July 1981 as the eighth Test playing nation, they had to wait until 6 September 1985, where Sri Lanka recorded their first Test win by beating India, in the second match of the series by 149 runs at the Paikiasothy Saravanamuttu Stadium, Colombo. As of 10 July 2018, Sri Lanka have played 272 Test matches; they have won 86 matches, lost 101 matches, and 85 matches were drawn. They have also won the 2001-02 Asian Test Championship, defeating Pakistan in the final by an innings and 175 runs.

Sri Lanka registered their first ODI win against India at Manchester, England, on 16 June 1979. As of 10 July 2018, Sri Lanka have played 816 ODI matches, winning 376 matches and losing 399; they also tied 5 matches, whilst 36 had no result. They also won the 1996 Cricket World Cup, co-champions in 2002 ICC Champions Trophy and also became six times Asian champions in 1986, 1997, 2004, 2008, 2014 and 2022 Asia Cup.

Sri Lanka played their first Twenty20 International (T20I) match at the Rose Bowl, on 15 June 2006, against England, winning the match by 2 runs. In 2014, they won the 2014 ICC World Twenty20, defeating India by 6 wickets. As of 10 July 2018, Sri Lanka have played 108 T20I matches and won 54 of them; 52 were lost and 1 tied and 1 no result match as well.

As of January 2016, Sri Lanka have faced all nine teams in Test cricket, with their most frequent opponent being Pakistan, playing 51 matches against them. Sri Lanka have registered more wins against Pakistan and Bangladesh than any other team, with 14. In ODI matches, Sri Lanka have played against 17 teams; they have played against India most frequently, with a winning percentage of 39.49 in 149 matches. Within usual major ODI nations, Sri Lanka have defeated England on 34 occasions, which is their best record in ODIs. The team have competed against 13 countries in T20Is, and have played 15 matches against New Zealand. Sri Lanka have defeated Australia and West Indies 6 occasions each. Sri Lanka was the best T20I team in the world, where they ranked number one in more than 32 months, and reached World Twenty20 final in three times.

The Sri Lanka national cricket team represents Sri Lanka in international cricket and is a full member of the International Cricket Council (ICC) with Test, One Day International (ODI) and Twenty20 International (T20I) status.

== Early years ==
Cricket was brought to Sri Lanka, then known as Ceylon, by the British during the British Period. It is assumed the game was first played in the country by the early 1800s, though the first recorded cricket match was played in 1832. The earliest definite mention of cricket in Ceylon was a report in the Colombo Journal on 5 September 1832 which called for the formation of a cricket club. The Colombo Cricket Club was formed soon afterwards and matches began in November 1832.

In October 1882, Ivo Bligh's team played an odds game in Colombo en route to Australia, where they "recovered those Ashes". In 1888–89, an English team led by [[Georg Vernon]] toured Ceylon and India, including an 11-a-side game against All-Ceylon at Kandy. In 1890, the Australian team en route to England played in Colombo.

Marylebone Cricket Club (MCC) teams have visited on no less than 23 occasions since 1911–12, most recently in 2000–01.

By 1911, there had been five English teams in Ceylon. Those were led by Ivo Bligh in 1882–83; George Vernon in 1889–90; WG Grace in 1891–92; Lord Hawke in 1892–93; and Andrew Stoddart in 1894–95. The Bligh, Grace and Stoddart teams were en route to Australia while the Vernon and Hawke ventures took in Ceylon as part of visits to India.

== 1920s–1960s ==
First-class matches played by Ceylon, 1920s-1960s
Season	Opponent	Venue	Played	Won	Lost	Drawn
1926–27	Marylebone Cricket Club	Viharamahadevi Park, Colombo	1		1	
Totals			1		1	
Other International matches
1926	Australians	Colombo Cricket Club Ground, Colombo	1		1	
1927	New Zealanders	Colombo	1			1
Totals			2		1	1
1932–33; 1936–37	7 Minor teams	2 Home, 5 Away	7	1	4	2
1932–33	India	Lawrence Gardens, Lahore; Feroz Shah Kotla, Delhi	2			2
1935–36	Australians	Viharamahadevi Park, Colombo	1			1
Totals			10	1	4	5
1940–41; 1945–46	3 Minor teams	1 Home, 3 Away	4	1	2	1
1944–45	India	Colombo Oval, Colombo	1			1
1948–49	West Indians	Colombo Oval, Colombo	2	1		1
1948–49	Pakistan	Colombo Oval, Colombo	2		2	
Totals			9	2	4	3
1949–50; 1957–58	9 Minor teams	1 Home, 3 Away	11	3	3	5
1949–50	Pakistan	Bagh-e-Jinnah, Lahore; Karachi Gymkhana Ground, Karachi	2		2	
1956–57	India	Colombo Oval, Colombo	2			2
Totals			15	3	5	7
1959–60; 1968–69	10 Minor teams	3 Home, 12 Away	15	2	3	10
1964–65	India	Central College Ground, Bangalore; Lal Bahadur Shastri Stadium, Hyderabad; Sardar Vallabhbhai Patel Stadium, Ahmedabad	3	1	2	
1966–67	Pakistan	Gaddafi Stadium, Lahore; Dacca Stadium, Dacca; National Stadium, Karachi	3		3	
1966–67	West Indies	Colombo Oval, Colombo	1		1	
1969–70	Australians	Colombo Oval, Colombo	1			1
Totals			23	3	9	11

Ceylon played its first first-class match under that name against Marylebone Cricket Club at Nomads Ground, Victoria Park, Colombo in 1926–27, losing by an innings.

The team's first win came against Patiala at Dhruve Pandove Stadium in 1932–33.

First-class cricket in Ceylon became restricted to games against visiting touring teams, notably the English and Australian teams who used Ceylon as a stopover on the long voyage to each other's country. Douglas Jardine's infamous "bodyline team" was there in 1932–33. Occasionally, teams representative of Ceylon played matches abroad, especially in India. English team Sir Julien Cahn's XI visited Ceylon in 1936–37.

The India national cricket team visited Ceylon in April 1945 and played one first-class match against Ceylon at the Paikiasothy Saravanamuttu Stadium in Colombo. The match was drawn on account of bad weather. India's team was a strong one captained by Vijay Merchant and including notable players such as Shute Banerjee, Mushtaq Ali, Lala Amarnath, Vijay Hazare and Rusi Modi.

Several Australian teams stopped and played matches in Ceylon while traveling to England and back. In the aftermath of World War II, came the Australian Services cricket team in Ceylon and India in 1945–46, featuring Keith Miller who scored a century in Colombo. Miller returned as part of the Australian cricket team in England in 1948 which played a game in Colombo during a stopover on their voyage to England.

The West Indies cricket team visited Ceylon in February 1949 and played two first-class matches versus Ceylon. The West Indies won the first match at Paikiasothy Saravanamuttu Stadium in Colombo by an innings and 22 runs after scoring 462–2 declared with centuries by Allan Rae, Everton Weekes and Clyde Walcott. Prior Jones took ten wickets in the match. The second match at the same venue was drawn, Rae making another century for West Indies.

The Pakistan national cricket team visited Ceylon in August 1949 to play two first-class matches versus Ceylon. Both games were played at the Paikiasothy Saravanamuttu Stadium in Colombo. Pakistan, captained by Mohammad Saeed, won the first match by an innings and 192 runs, Saeed himself top-scoring with 93. The great Pakistan bowler Fazal Mahmood took 4–15 as Ceylon were bowled out for only 95 in their second innings. Pakistan won the second match by 10 wickets despite some good batting by Ceylon in their first innings.

From 1953–4 until 1975–6, the Ceylon Cricket Association played a first-class match against Madras (later renamed Tamil Nadu) for the Gopalan Trophy. This fixture was played in Colombo roughly every two years, with one further fixture in 1982–3, alternating with the fixture being held in Madras.

India visited Ceylon in November 1956 and played two first-class international matches against Ceylon at the Paikiasothy Saravanamuttu Stadium in Colombo. Both matches were drawn. The Indian team was captained by Polly Umrigar and included Nari Contractor, Subhash Gupte, Pankaj Roy, A. G. Kripal Singh and Vijay Manjrekar.

== 1960s ==
Sri Lanka had associate member status of the International Cricket Council from 1965 to 1981 when they would be awarded full membership.

In 1964-65 Ceylon beat a Pakistan A team in Ceylon and a full Indian team in India. West Indies visited Ceylon in January 1967 and played a single first-class match at the Paikiasothy Saravanamuttu Stadium in Colombo versus Ceylon. The match was drawn. West Indies was captained by Gary Sobers who scored 115 in his team's only innings. Other centuries were scored by Basil Butcher and Clive Lloyd.

Ceylon looked to a tour of England in 1968 to advance their case to be elevated to Test status. A schedule of 19 matches was arranged from early June to early August, including a match at Lord's against the MCC, nine first-class matches against county teams, and five other first-class matches.

First-class matches played by Ceylon, 1960s
Season	Opponent	Venue	Played	Won	Lost	Drawn
1959–60; 1968–69	10 Minor teams	3 Home, 12 Away	15	2	3	10
1964–65	India	Central College Ground, Bangalore; Lal Bahadur Shastri Stadium, Hyderabad; Sardar Vallabhbhai Patel Stadium, Ahmedabad	3	1	2	
1966–67	Pakistan	Gaddafi Stadium, Lahore; Dacca Stadium, Dacca; National Stadium, Karachi	3		3	
1966–67	West Indies	Colombo Oval, Colombo	1		1	
1969–70	Australians	Colombo Oval, Colombo	1			1
Totals			23	3	9	11

However, the Board of Control for Cricket in Ceylon had insufficient money to pay for the trip, and private donations had to be sought. Also, the government was reluctant to release the necessary foreign exchange at a time when it was struggling to afford vital imports.

The tour was ultimately cancelled following a controversy over team selection in April 1968. Chandra Schaffter, one of the four selectors, resigned when he found that the other selectors were going to select each other in the team, one of them as captain. The selected team was Herbert Fernando (captain), Michael Tissera (vice-captain), Ranjit Fernando, Abu Fuard, Gamini Goonesena, Stanley Jayasinghe, T. B. Kehelgamuwa, Dan Piachaud, Anurudda Polonowita, Mano Ponniah, Buddy Reid, Daya Sahabandu, Anura Tennekoon and Dhansiri Weerasinghe. Herbert Fernando and Dhansiri Weerasinghe were the two selectors who chose themselves. The resultant uproar caused the tour to be cancelled in May, just days before the team was scheduled to leave.

In 1969–70 another Australian team arrived in Ceylon. This team played one first-class match against the national Ceylon team before going on to India for a five-Test series.

== 1970s ==
First-class matches played by Ceylon, 1970s
Season	Opponent	Venue	Played	Won	Lost	Drawn
1969–70	Marylebone Cricket Club	Colombo Oval, Colombo	1		1	
1970–71	Kerala cricket team	University Stadium, Trivandrum	1	1		
1970–71	Andhra Chief Minister's XI	Brahmananda Reddy Stadium, Guntur	1	1		
1970–71	Tamil Nadu cricket team	Madras Cricket Club Ground, Madras	1			1
Totals			4	2	1	1

Pakistan visited Sri Lanka in November 1972 to play a single first-class match versus the Sri Lanka national team at the Paikiasothy Saravanamuttu Stadium in Colombo. The match was drawn after being affected by rain. Pakistan, captained by Intikhab Alam, scored 262–8 declared and 48–3 declared. Sri Lanka scored 133 and 120–3.

India toured Sri Lanka in January and February 1974. They played two first-class and two limited overs matches versus Sri Lanka and two further first-class matches versus the Sri Lanka Board president's XI. India defeated Sri Lanka at the Sinhalese Sports Club Ground by 6 wickets but the other three first-class games were impacted by the weather and were drawn.

West Indies visited Sri Lanka in February 1975 as part of a wider tour of India and Pakistan. Captained by Clive Lloyd, West Indies played two first-class matches against Sri Lanka, that were both drawn, and a limited overs match that West Indies won by 8 wickets.

Sri Lanka first competed in top-level international cricket in 1975, when they played against the West Indies during 1975 Cricket World Cup; the West Indies won the match by 9 wickets at Old Trafford, Manchester, England.

Pakistan toured Sri Lanka in January 1976 to play three first-class and two limited overs matches. Sri Lanka won the opening first-class match at Colombo Cricket Club Ground by 4 wickets and then Pakistan won the second match at the same venue by the same margin. In between, Pakistan played the Sri Lanka Board president's XI at Asgiriya Stadium in Kandy and they won this by 7 wickets.

English team D. H. Robins' XI visited Sri Lanka in 1977–78

Pakistan, captained by Majid Khan, visited Sri Lanka in April 1979 to play a limited overs match versus the Sri Lanka national team. The match at the Paikiasothy Saravanamuttu Stadium was won by Pakistan by 55 runs after scoring 164–8 in their 40 overs. Sri Lanka in reply could only manage 109–8.

West Indies visited Sri Lanka in February 1979. The main first-class match with Sri Lanka at Paikiasothy Saravanamuttu Stadium in Colombo was drawn. West Indies had previously drawn a warm-up game against Sri Lanka Board president's XI at Colombo Cricket Club Ground. West Indies also played three limited overs matches.

In 1979 they won the ICC Trophy, qualifying for the 1979 Cricket World Cup, where their first One Day International win against a Test cricket playing nation came in the against India.

== 1980s ==
The 1981 Australians to England played a match in Colombo against Sri Lanka only months before Sri Lanka achieved Test status.

On 21 July 1981, Sri Lanka was admitted by the International Cricket Council as a full member and was awarded Test cricket status, becoming the eighth Test playing nation. They played their first Test match against England at Paikiasothy Saravanamuttu Stadium, Colombo on 17 February 1982. Bandula Warnapura was the captain for Sri Lanka in that match, which England was victorious by 7 wickets.

The Zimbabwe national cricket team toured Sri Lanka in December 1983. At this time, Sri Lanka had just achieved Test status but Zimbabwe had not. The Zimbabwe team played two first-class matches versus Sri Lanka Board president's XI at Tyronne Fernando Stadium and a Sri Lankan XI at Paikiasothy Saravanamuttu Stadium. Both games were drawn. Zimbabwe also played three limited overs matches against the Sri Lankan XI.

The English cricket team had a short spell in Sri Lanka at the start of their tour of India in 1984–85. This was not in their original schedule; the change was due to the assassination of Indira Gandhi.

New Zealand played two limited overs internationals against Sri Lanka in 1984–85. Sri Lanka won the first match by 4 wickets and New Zealand won the second by 7 wickets.

They had to wait until 6 September 1985, where Sri Lanka recorded their first Test win, under the leadership of Duleep Mendis, by beating India, in the second match of the series by 149 runs at the Paikiasothy Saravanamuttu Stadium, Colombo.

The first edition of Asia Cup was held in April 1984 with the participation of India, Pakistan and Sri Lanka. Sri Lanka was led by Duleep Mendis. Sri Lanka played Pakistan in the first match, were Pakistan scored 187 runs. Arjuna Ranatunga took 3 wickets for 38 runs. Sri Lanka won the match by 5 wickets courtesy of unbeaten fifty from Roy Dias. Second game was against India, where Sri Lanka batted first and bowled out for 96 runs. India reached the mark without a wicket.

The second Asia Cup was held in Sri Lanka. Sri Lanka was led by Duleep Mendis. In the first match against Pakistan, Sri Lanka lost the match by 81 runs. Pakistan posted 197 runs on the board, where Sri Lanka bowled out for 116 runs. Second match was against Bangladesh. In the match, Bangladesh scored 131 runs and Sri Lanka won the match by 7 wickets. With that win, Sri Lanka qualified for the final. In the final, Pakistan scored 191 runs and Sri Lanka won the match by 5 wickets. Ranatunga scored match winning 57 runs. With that win, Sri Lanka won the Asia Cup for the first time.

The 1988 Asia Cup was held in Bangladesh among the four cricketing nations of the subcontinent. under the captaincy of Arjuna Ranatunga, Sri Lanka began the tournament against Pakistan with a win. Pakistan scored 194 runs and Sri Lanka passed the landmark in 39th over. In the second match against India, Sri Lanka batted first and scored 271 runs. Aravinda de Silva and Athula Samarasekara scored fifties in the match. India started the run chase softly and put up an 89-run partnership. With wickets in the regular intervals, India lost the match by 17 runs. Kapila Wijegunawardene took 4 wickets for 49 runs. In the final group stage match, Sri Lanka played against the host, Bangladesh. Inexperienced Bangladeshi team scored 118 runs and pacer Ravi Ratnayeke took 4 wickets for 23 runs. Sri Lanka scored 120 runs in the 31st overs where the opener Brendon Kuruppu scored an unbeaten 58. Sri Lanka played the final against Pakistan. However, they scored 176 runs in the match and Pakistan won the match by 6 wickets and won their first title of Asia Cup.

== 1990s ==
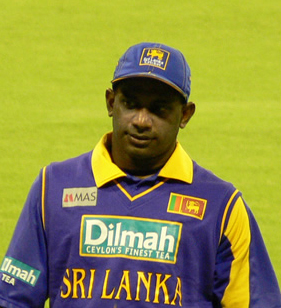
Sanath Jayasuriya, known as the Master Blaster, due to high class match winning devastating performances in ODIs came to prominence in the 1990s. He was also Sri Lankan captain between 1999 and 2002

Sri Lanka had to wait for more than 7 years for their next series victory, which came against New Zealand in December 1992. Sri Lanka won the two Test match series 1–0. This was immediately followed by a 1 wicket victory against England in a Test series containing a solitary Test match.

2 years later, on 15 March 1995, Sri Lanka won its first overseas Test match under the leadership of Arjuna Ranatunga against New Zealand, when they beat them by 241 runs at Napier. This win also resulted in their first overseas Test series victory, 1–0. Their next series too was an overseas series, against Pakistan, and that one too resulted in Sri Lankan victory.

1990–91 Asia Cup

The fourth Asia Cup was held in India with the participation of India, Sri Lanka and Bangladesh. Pakistan pulled out the tournament due to political conflicts with India. In the first match, Sri Lanka beat India by 36 runs. Sri Lanka scored 214 runs courtesy of 105-ball fifty from captain Arjuna Ranatunga. India were bowled out for 178 runs where Rumesh Ratnayake took 3 wickets. Against Bangladesh, Sri Lanka scored 249 runs where Aravinda scored 89 runs. Bangladesh scored only 178 runs and Sri Lanka won the match by 71 runs. Sri Lanka qualified for the final with India. Sri Lanka batted first and scored 204 runs, where India won the match by 7 wicket with 17 balls remaining. This was India's third Asia Cup title and Sri Lanka's third consecutive appearance in Asia Cup finals.

1995 Asia Cup

The 1995 Pepsi Asia Cup was held in UAE with the participation of four cricketing nations of subcontinent. Arjuna Ranatunga captained the team. Against Bangladesh, Sri Lanka scored 233 runs due to fifties from Sanath Jayasuriya and Aravinda de Silva. Jayasuriya was promoted to the opening slot with Asanka Gurusinha. Bangladesh team was destroyed by Muttiah Muralitharan, who took 4 wickets for just 23 runs. Bangladesh scored only 115 runs Sri Lanka won the match by 107 runs. Next match was against India, where India won the match by 8 wickets with Tendulkar's century. Against Pakistan, Sri Lanka won the match by 5 wickets and qualified for the fourth consecutive Asia Cup final. Sri Lanka scored 230 runs where Gurusinha scored 87 runs. India in reply, scored 233 runs with unbeaten fifties from Sidhu and Azharuddin. India won the fourth Asia Cup title.

1996 Cricket World Cup

1996 Cricket World Cup, hosted by India, Pakistan and Sri Lanka. The Sri Lankan team was led by Arjuna Ranatunga, where they played their first round in Group A with Australia, West Indies, India, Zimbabwe and Kenya. Australia and The West Indies forfeited the matches against Sri Lanka held in Sri Lankan soil due to safety concerns, so Sri Lanka won both matches by a walkover. Sri Lanka won against Zimbabwe by 6 wickets, courtesy of Aravinda de Silva's 91 runs, which was recorded as the highest ever score for a Sri Lankan in the World Cup, and highest ever for any player at the Sinhalese Sports Club Ground at that time. Sanath Jayasuriya overtook Indian bowlers in the next match, where Sri Lanka won the match by 6 wickets. In this match, Jayasuriya smashed 47 runs in four overs of Indian bowler Manoj Prabhakar. The last group match was against Kenya, Sri Lanka recorded the highest team total in that time by scoring 398/5, Aravinda again played a gem of an inning with 145 runs. This score was the highest score by a Sri Lankan player in the World Cup.

In the first quarterfinals, Sri Lanka played with England, where Sanath devastated the English players with his fast 82 runs just off 44 balls. Sri Lanka won the match by 5 wickets and progressed through to their first semi-finals in the World Cup. Sri Lanka met India again in the semi-final, and the match was played in Kolkata, at the Eden Gardens, under the eyes of a lot of Indian fans. Sri Lanka came into bat first, but their first three wickets were taken very early. But then, Aravinda and Roshan Mahanama paced the innings with their half-centuries. Skipper Arjuna and Hashan Tillakaratne also played valuable innings. Indian pacer Javagal Srinath took 3 wickets.

Sri Lanka finished with 251/8 in 50 overs, giving Indians a good chance of winning the match. But the Sri Lankan bowling was so good, Navjot Singh Sidhu and skipper Mohammad Azharuddin got out very early. Sachin Tendulkar along with Sanjay Manjrekar slowly built the innings, but their wickets gave Sri Lanka a big chance of winning. When India was 120/8, the Indian fans got aggressive, throwing bottles and other materials into the ground, where the match could not be continued further. The umpires went onto a discussion with both teams and decided to award the match to Sri Lanka. Sri Lanka went on to their first finals in World Cup history.

The finals was against Australia led by Mark Taylor at Gaddafi Stadium, Lahore. Before the match, former 1992 Cricket World Cup winning captain Imran Khan talked with Sri Lankan captain Ranatunga, stating that if they won the toss, to choose batting first. This was because the ground was more favorable to batting first and bowling under lights. In the toss, however, Ranatunga won the match, but chose to field first. After a blazing start from captain Mark Taylor and young superstar and future captain Ricky Ponting, Australia fell from being 1–137 to 5–170 after which Sri Lanka's four-prong spin attack took its toll. After Australia crashed to a 7–241 in its quota of 50 overs, Sri Lanka overcame a nervous start where they lost both openers before the score was 30, to win in 45 overs. Sri Lankan batting sensation Aravinda played a match-winning knock of 107, not out, and was assisted ably by fellow veterans Asanka Gurusinha (65) and captain Ranatunga (47*). De Silva was named man of the match after he had taken 3–42 in his 10 overs eairlier in the Australian innings & Sanath Jayasuriya got man of the series award.

Sri Lankan cricket's greatest moment undoubtedly came during the aforementioned 1996 World Cup, when they defeated the top-ranked Australian team under the captaincy of Arjuna Ranatunga and the extraordinary performance of Aravinda de Silva in the finals. Sri Lanka lost their openers, Sanath Jayasuriya and Romesh Kaluwitharana early but then Asanka Gurusinha and de Silva, settled in. Gurusinha dismissed after valuable 57 and then de Silva had the match winning partnership with skipper Ranatunga. Sri Lanka needed 51 off the last ten overs. De Silva hundred's, a knock which was a lesson in application, was the third ton in a World Cup final, after Clive Lloyd's in 1975 and Viv Richards' in 1979. It was the first time to won the World Cup final while chasing in the history as first instance to win the World Cup in home continent.

Sri Lanka's game style over the course of the series revolutionized One Day International Cricket, and was characterized by the highly aggressive batting of their openers Sanath Jayasuriya and Romesh Kaluwitharana in the first fifteen overs of the innings to take advantage of the fielding restrictions imposed during this period. This strategy has since become a hallmark of One Day International cricket.

1997 Asia Cup

The sixth edition of Asia Cup, was held in Sri Lanka for the second time. Four subcontinent teams participated to the tournament. Ranatunga led the world cup victorious team into the Asia Cup. In the first match against Pakistan, Sri Lanka scored 239 runs along with Marvan Atapattu's fifty. Pakistan scored 224 runs, where Jayasuriya took 4 wickets. Sri Lanka won the match by 15 runs. In the next match, India scored 227 runs by batting first. During the chase, skipper Ranatunga scored a hundred with unbeaten 131 runs to secure the victory for Sri Lanka by 6 wickets. In the last group match, Sri Lanka handed over 103-run defeat to Bangladesh. Jayasuriya scored a century in the match, where he along with Atapattu had a 171-run partnership for the first wicket. Bangladeshi openers put on 76-run partnership, but after their falling, Bangladesh lost the plot and scored only 193 runs. India and Sri Lanka qualified for the final where Sri Lanka won by 8 wickets to win its second Asia Cup and ending India's three consecutive championship run. Atapattu top scored with unbeaten 84 runs along with fifties by Jayasuriya and Ranatunga.

1999 Cricket World Cup

1999 Cricket World Cup hosted by England and Netherlands, where Sri Lanka came as defending champions. Ranatunga again led the team with 1996 World Cup winning members - Jayasuriya, Muralitharan, Mahanama, Hashan, Kalu, Vaas, Aravinda, Pramodya and Upul Chandana. They grouped in Group A with South Africa, India, Zimbabwe, England and Kenya.

Sri Lanka played their first group match with England, where they only scored 204 bowled out in 48.2 overs. the high bouncing pitches gave the subcontinent players a real headache. England won the match comfortably by 8 wickets. In the second group match, against South Africa, they played badly. By chasing 199 runs of South Africa, Sri Lanka only scored 110 runs, only Mahanama scored 36 runs. Against Zimbabwe, Sri Lanka finally won the match by 4 wickets. Zimbabwe only scored 197/9 and Sri Lanka scored 198/6. Next match was with India, where they posted 373/6 in total with Sourav Ganguly played a magnificent 183 runs in 158 balls. Sri Lanka scored only 216/10, and India won by 157 runs. With this loss, Sri Lanka eliminated from the World Cup. Being the champions in last World Cup, this world cup campaign was really disappointed. Their last match was against Kenyans, where Sri Lanka won the match by 45 runs.

== 2000s ==
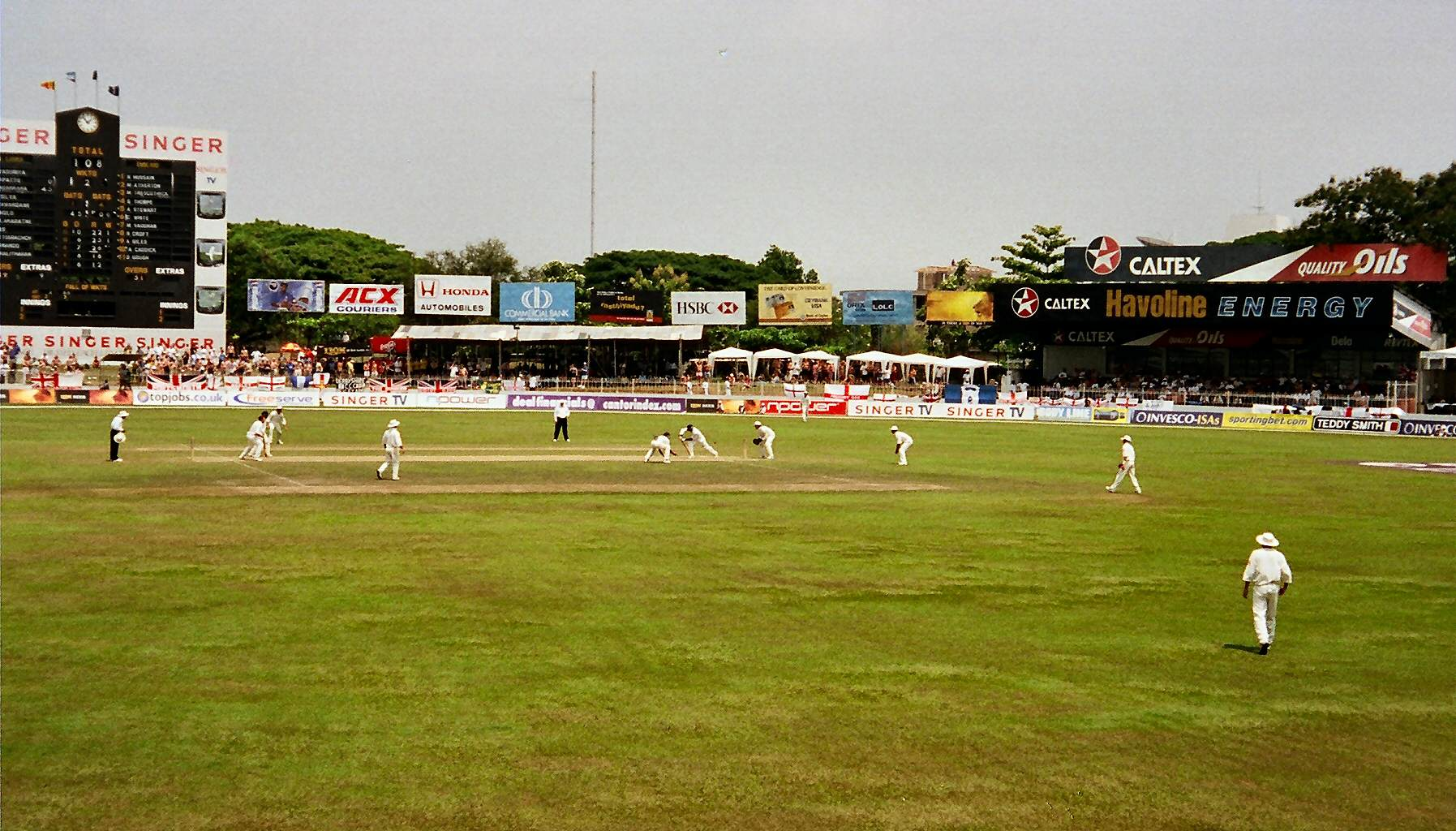
Marvan Atapattu, Sri Lankan captain between 2002 and 2005, scored three centuries, including 201 not out against England, at the Sinhalese Sport Club Ground in March 2001

On 14 June 2000, Sri Lanka played their 100th match against Pakistan on 14 June 2000. They played this match at SSC, Colombo under the leadership of Sanath Jayasuriya. Pakistan won the watch by 5 wickets.

They have also won the 2001-02 Asian Test Championship, defeating Pakistan in the final by an innings and 175 runs.

2000 Asia Cup

The seventh Asia Cup tournament was held in Bangladesh. All four subcontinent cricketing nations were participated, where Sri Lanka was led by Sanath Jayasuriya. In the first match against Bangladesh, skipper Jayasuriya won the toss and elected to bowl first where Chaminda Vaas took two quick wickets. For Bangladesh, Javed Omar scored an unbeaten 85, even though they ended up only 175 in their allotted 50 overs. Sri Lanka achieved the target in 31st overs with 96 runs came off the bat of Aravinda. In the second match, skipper Jayasuriya scored brilliant 105 runs and posted 278 on the board. Sachin Tendulkar scored 93 runs in the chase, but was not enough for the win. Sri Lanka won the match by 71 runs. Against Pakistan, Sri Lanka scored only 192 runs and lost the match by 7 wickets. Pakistan won the tournament beating Sri Lanka by 39 runs in the final by 35 runs. Marvan Atapattu scored his fourth hundred in his 96th match and became the third highest ODI century maker for Sri Lanka.

2003 Cricket World Cup

2003 Cricket World Cup was moved to the African continent, where South Africa, Zimbabwe and Kenya hosted the tournament. Sanath Jayasuriya led the team. The team was grouped in Pool B with South Africa, New Zealand, West Indies, Bangladesh, Canada and Kenya. The first match was against New Zealand, where Blackcaps captain Stephen Fleming won the toss and sent Sri Lanka in to bat first. Sri Lanka's opening batsmen- Jayasuriya and Marvan Atapattu were going strong and kept a steady run rate until the fifth over when they conceded their first wicket. Skipper Jayasuriya dominated the Blackcaps bowling attack by scoring 120 runs. The final score at the end of the innings was 272/7. The second innings didn't start very well for New Zealand, losing their opening batsman, Nathan Astle, in the first over and captain Flemming in the second. The first real form of excitement came for New Zealand supporters when Styris and Cairns start hitting a few boundaries. Scott Styris overpassed Jayasuriya's batting by his 141 runs, but New Zealand all out for 217 in the total. Sri Lanka won by 47 runs and Jayasuriya was named man of the match.

Next match was against Bangladesh, where Chaminda Vaas became the only bowler to claim a hat tricks in the first three balls of any form of international cricket when he took the first three wickets off the opening three balls of the match. With this feat, Vaas became the third of only four players to have achieved two hat tricks. Bangladesh poorly scored 124/10. Sri Lankan opening batsmen reached the target without a wicket falling. At the very next match against Canada, Sri Lanka again involved for a World record, where Canada total of 36 was the lowest total in World Cup history and lowest in all ODIs. Sri Lanka comfortably won the match by 9 wickets.

All these World Record matches next became a desperate sad for all the Sri Lankans. They lost the match to underdog Kenyans for the first time. The match was at Kenyan soil, Kenya batted first and scored 201 runs courtesy of 60 runs by Kennedy Otieno. Murali took 4 wickets and Vaas with 3 wickets. Sri Lanka came to bat, only Aravinda scored 41 runs. All the others scored less than 30. Sri Lanka all out for just 157 runs in 45 overs. This was the first time that, Sri Lanka lost a match to an affiliate nation. Against West Indies, Sri Lanka back in the game, where they won by 6 runs despite Ramnaresh Sarwan heroics. Last group match was against South Africa, Sri Lanka batted first and scored 268/9. South Africa was at 229/6 when rain came. According to Duckworth–Lewis method, the match was tied. Finally, Sri Lanka reached top of the Pool B, and selected for the quarterfinals.

In the quarterfinals, they suffered heavy losses to Australia and India, only won over Zimbabwe. This result gave them fourth place in standings, where Kenya recorded first semi-final birth in the history. Sri Lanka's semi-final was against Australia. On a difficult, slow pitch at Port Elizabeth, Australia struggled their way to 212 (7 wickets, 50 overs) against tight Sri Lankan bowling, thanks mainly to a great innings from Andrew Symonds (91* from 118 balls, 7 fours, 1 six), demonstrating again captain Ricky Ponting's faith in him. Vaas, continuing his excellent tournament, took three wickets. Australia's pace attack then ripped through the Sri Lankan top order, with Brett Lee (3/35 in 8 overs) taking three early wickets and Glenn McGrath (1/20 in 7 overs) taking one. By the time rain arrived in the 39th over, continued tight bowling had squeezed Sri Lanka to 123 (7 wickets, 38.1 overs), well behind the target given by the Duckworth–Lewis method. This is the match in which Adam Gilchrist famously "walked" despite being given not out.

2004 Asia Cup

After semi final loss in World Cup, Aravinda de Silva retired from international cricket by making a great hole in the line up. He ended the career as Sri Lanka's greatest batsman and the longest-serving player in international cricket that stretches back nearly two decades. Eighth edition of Asia Cup was held in Sri Lanka with the participation of four test playing Asian nations with two leading Asian associate nations, the UAE and Hong Kong. Atapattu led the Sri Lanka team which contained new young faces in international arena.

In the first match, Sri Lanka thrashed UAE by 116 runs. Avishka Gunawardene, whose fine 73 helped Sri Lanka to 239 was enough for the win, and UAE's batsmen were easily dismissed for 123 in 47.5 overs. In the second match, Sri Lanka batted first and scored 282 runs with Mahela Jayawardene's fifty. In chasing, India started poorly and lost 5 wickets for 71 runs. Rahul Dravid scored 82 runs was the only Indian performance in the match. Sri Lanka finally won the match by 12 runs and qualified for the Super Four stage as the favorites to win the tournament.

During Super Four stage, Sri Lanka won the matches Pakistan and Bangladesh to reach consecutive Asia Cup final. Against Bangladesh, Jayasuriya scored his devastating best with an unbeaten 107 runs and Gunawardene scored unbeaten 64. Sri Lanka won the match by 10 wickets with 16 overs to spare. Jayasuriya continued his blistering hitting in the game against India, where he scored 130 runs. With 18 balls left, and 18 runs needed to win the match, Sri Lanka lost the grip with quick wickets of Jayasuriya, Dilshan and Chandana. 11 were needed from the final six balls, Zaheer Khan bowled a magnificent last over to win the game for India by 4 runs. The two opponents met again in the final of the Asia Cup, where Sri Lankans batted first and scored 228 runs. Atapattu top scored with 65 runs. India scored only 203 runs in their 50 overs and Sri Lanka won the Asia Cup for the third time.

2007 Cricket World Cup

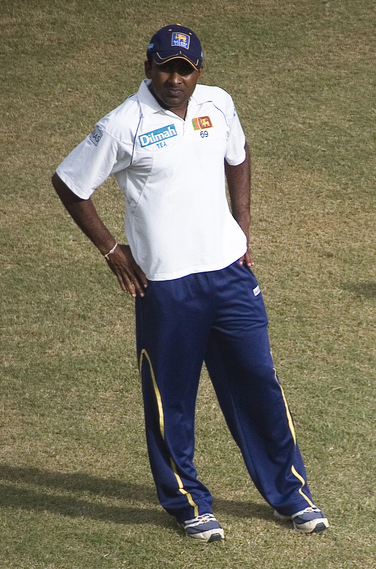
Mahela Jayawardene was Sri Lankan captain between 2005 and 2012

West Indies islands hosted the 9th Cricket World Cup, where Sri Lanka was led by Mahela Jayawardena. The 12 teams were grouped into four groups, with Sri Lanka in group B. India, Bangladesh and Bermuda played with Sri Lanka in group matches. Bermuda's World Cup debut became the second-heaviest defeat at the World Cup, 40 runs worse than Scotland's defeat the day before. After Sri Lanka won the toss and batted, they scored 321/6 in 50 overs while skipper Jayawardene, Kumar Sangakkara and Chamara Silva all collected half-centuries. Kevin Hurdle took two wickets for Bermuda, but his second over lasted 14 balls due to no-balls and wides. Bermuda fell to 20 for four after Lasith Malinga had taken three wickets in three overs, ending with bowling figures of three for 10. With the seven first men down, Lionel Cann paired up with Delyone Borden for a 25-run partnership, the largest of the innings. Farveez Maharoof removed both before Murali had Dwayne Leverock lbw to end the innings for 78, Bermuda's lowest total ever in One-day Internationals. Sri Lanka won the match by 243 runs.

Next match for Sri Lanka was against Bangladesh, who won the match against India and was in good performance before coming to this match. But Bangladesh's chances of reaching the Super Eights by means of net run rate diminished after a 198-run defeat to Sri Lanka, the third-heaviest of their history and the largest since their 200-run defeat to India in 2003. It was only due to the rain during Bangladesh's innings and the consequently readjusted target that the margin of victory was smaller; Bangladesh were bowled out for 112, with all the Sri Lankan bowlers except Jayasuriya taking wickets, but Jayasuriya had already contributed with seven sixes in his 24th One-day International century as Sri Lanka totalled 318 for four. Spinners Mohammad Rafique and Abdur Razzak were the only ones to keep the economy rate below five an over, while for Sri Lanka only Russel Arnold cost more than five an over. Four Sri Lankan batsmen outscored Bangladesh' top-scoring batsman, Mohammad Ashraful, who made 45 not out from number seven.

Last group match was against the neighbors-India, who was at the brink of eliminating from the tournament. So the match was highly valuable to Indians than Lankans. Sri Lanka, meanwhile, went through to the second stage unbeaten, after newcomers to the team Upul Tharanga and Chamara Silva both struck half-centuries and Murali took three wickets, including wicket-keeper MS Dhoni for a duck.

Indian pacer Zaheer Khan started off with a wide, but also had Jayasuriya caught behind in his opening spell, striking at the end of the seventh over, and also had Tharanga in trouble with in-cutters. Tharanga, however, batted through nearly two thirds of the match for his 64, and none of the bowlers kept the run rate below four as Sri Lanka made it to 254 for six, due to poor cricket from India. For Sri Lanka, Vaas struck twice within eleven overs, taking a return catch off Robin Uthappa and having Ganguly caught for a 23-ball seven. Tendulkar followed in the next over, bowled by Dilhara Fernando for his second duck of the tournament, but Virender Sehwag and skipper Rahul Dravid made it through the next ten overs, before the "turning point" arrived when Murali had Sehwag caught at first slip in his third over; the next six overs yielded only 14 runs and two more wickets, after Dhoni went lbw to Murali, and India needed 141 runs off 22 overs. Despite double-digit scores from Ajit Agarkar, Harbhajan Singh and Munaf Patel, they were bowled out for 185. India eliminated and Sri Lanka through to Super 8s.

Super 8s has gone pretty well for Sri Lankans, with their performances, only lost to South Africa and Australia. In the first Super 8 match for Sri Lanka vs South Africa, Malinga took four wickets with four consecutive deliveries in international cricket. Sri Lanka won the toss and elected to bat, and lost their first five wickets for 98, with Charl Langeveldt taking two in his first spell. Tillakaratne Dilshan and Russel Arnold built a sixth-wicket stand of 97 in nearly 20 overs, but Dilshan was caught off Makhaya Ntini's bowling, and then Langeveldt took 3 in 5 balls as Sri Lanka were bowled out in the final over for 209. In reply, Vaas had AB de Villiers bowled in the first over, but Jacques Kallis added 95 with Graeme Smith and 65 with Herschelle Gibbs, leading South Africa to within four runs of victory with his 86. Then Lasith Malinga struck and show begun. His four-in-four had Shaun Pollock, Andrew Hall, Kallis and Ntini. Though South Africa managed a run off Vaas in the intermediate over. South Africa now needed three runs to win with one wicket in hand, and eleven deliveries went by before Robin Peterson got an outside edge to a Malinga ball, which went out of reach of slip and went fine for four. South Africa won the match by only 1 wicket, in a very tied game. With this feat, Lasith Malinga became the only bowler to get four consecutive wickets in four balls in any form of the game.

Next match was against the hosts-West Indies. The start of the match was delayed due to bad weather, but a full 50-over match was played, which resulted in West Indies' third defeat in four days. Jayasuriya and Jayawardene added 183 for the third wicket, before Dilshan came in and took 39 off 22 deliveries as the final eleven overs yielded 84 runs. In the meantime, Jayasuriya scored his 35th ODI century, the second most prolific ODI century maker in history after Tendulkar. In reply, West Indies needed 170 off 94 when Ramnaresh Sarwan was stumped off Jayasuriya; they only got 56 of those, and were bowled out for 190, with four batsmen out in single figures. Sri Lanka won the match by huge 113 runs.

Against England, the match again became a nail biter. Sri Lanka batted first and made 235, bowled out off the last ball with a run out. England lost their openers for 0 and 10, but Ian Bell and Kevin Pietersen made a stand of 90 for the third wicket, and skipper Paul Collingwood joined Pietersen to add a further 25 before Pietersen was caught and bowled by Murali. England then lost two more wickets for seven runs to Dilhara Fernando, and required 103 off 16.3 overs with four wickets in hand. However, Ravi Bopara scored a half-century in his fourth One-Day International innings, as he and Paul Nixon took England within three runs of victory. However, Fernando returned for the last over, and bowled Bopara off the last ball giving Sri Lanka victory. During the match, Jayasuriya became the most capped ODI player, surpassing Tendulkar. Sri Lanka won two of last three matches -won against New Zealand and Ireland, lost to Australia, secured their place to semi-finals.

In the semi-final, Sri Lanka met New Zealand again, where Sri Lanka scored 289/7 courtesy of century by skipper Jayawardena. New Zealand only scored 208 runs and eliminated from the World Cup. Sri Lanka selected for their second final in World Cups, against same opponent as in 1996-Australians. Aussie skipper Ricky Ponting won the toss and elected to bat. However, the start of play was delayed due to rain, and the match was reduced to 38 overs per side. Gilchrist played an incredible innings of 149 – the highest for any batsman in a World Cup final – to give Australia an imposing total going in at the break. But the innings was in controversy due to Gilchrist usage of squash ball inside the left glove.

While Sri Lankan batsmen Sangakkara and Jayasuriya were adding 116 for the second wicket, the contest was alive, but after the pair got out, Sri Lanka's chances slowly diminished. Further rain forced the reduction of Sri Lanka's innings to just 36 overs, with the target revised to 269. At the end of the 33rd over, with Sri Lanka still trailing the adjusted D/L target by 37 runs, the umpires suspended the game due to bad light. While Australia's players began to celebrate their victory (since the minimum 20 overs had been reached), the umpires incorrectly announced that because the match was suspended due to light and not rain, the final three overs would have to be bowled the following day. With Sri Lanka needing 61 runs from 18 deliveries, Jayawardene agreed there was no need to return the following day, and instructed his team to resume batting, with Ponting agreeing to play only spinners. The umpires later apologised for their error: the match should have ended then with Australia winning by 37 runs. The last three overs were played in almost complete darkness, during which Sri Lanka added just nine runs, giving Australia a 53-run victory by the D-L method, as Sri Lanka had batted two overs fewer than they had.

2007 ICC World Twenty20

The first edition of World Twenty20 World Championship, which was hosted by South Africa. Sri Lanka played under the captaincy of Mahela Jayawardena in Group C along with New Zealand and Kenya. First match was against Kenyans, which was a world record-breaking match. Kenya won the toss and gave Lankans to bat first. Tharanga and Jayasuriya started the innings, but Tharanga was bowled by Thomas Odoyo. Then Sangakkara joined Jayasuriya. Sangakkara bowled by Jimmy Kamande when the score was 94 in 9 overs. The show time begun then, where Jayasuriya and Jayawardena scored unfaithfully for all the bowlers. Jayasuriya caught when he was in 88, with 11 fours and 4 sixes. Jayawardena on the other hand, played a brilliant innings, scored 65 from just 27 ball when until he was lbw. Sri Lanka was 215/6 in 18 overs, when Jehan Mubarak came to the crease. He scored an unbelievable sixes down the ground to Nehemiah Odhiambo and Peter Ongondo. He smashed 46 off 13 balls with 3 fours and 5 huge sixes. The strike rate of this innings was 353.84. Sri Lanka finished with 260/6, which recorded highest T20 total in any top-level Twenty20 match. Kenyans came to bat with chasing the huge task. Vaas immediately made a breakthrough, dismissing opening batsman Maurice Ouma for a duck. Kenya never recovered, and were reduced to just 88 runs in the 20th over as Sri Lanka dismissed their batsmen cheaply. The win, by 172 runs, is the largest margin of victory in a Twenty20 internationals. Sri Lanka's total was boosted by 30 fours, the best till now in a Twenty20 international and 186 runs came in fours and sixes, the highest by far in a Twenty20 international.

Next group match was with Blackcaps, where they scored 164/7. Sri Lanka won the match in 18.5 overs with 3 wickets gone. Jayasuriya became the Man-of-the-Match in both these matches. Within Super 8s, Sri Lanka qualified to Group F. In first Super 8 match with Pakistan, Sri Lanka lost by 33 runs. In the next match against Bangladesh, they bounced back well with a 64 run victory. The crucial match to qualify for the semi-finals was with Australians and Sri Lanka only scored 101 against Aussie pacers. Australia won the match by 10 wickets and Sri Lanka eliminated from the tournament.

2008 Asia Cup

After criticized World Cup final, Sri Lanka went Pakistan for the ninth Asia Cup. The Asia Cup was belonged to the mystery spinner Ajantha Mendis. India, Pakistan, Sri Lanka, Bangladesh and Asian associate nations UAE and Hong Kong were participated to the tournament. Mahela Jayawardene led the Sri Lanka team. In the first match against Bangladesh, Sri Lanka piled an imposing total of 357. Jayasuriya scored 72 runs and his opening partner Kumar Sangakkara scored 101 runs. Chamara Kapugedera scored 74 runs at the end of the innings. In reply, Bangladeshi were never in the chase. They scored 226 runs and Sri Lanka won the match by 131 runs. In the next match, Sri Lanka bowled out UAE for 148 runs to win the match by 142 runs. Ajantha Mendis took a five-wicket haul in the match.

In Super Four stage, Sri Lanka easily defeated Pakistan and Bangladesh to reach consecutive Asia Cup final. Sangakkara scored 112 runs backed up by a disciplined bowling performance handed a 64-run win over Pakistan. Against Bangladesh, it was a Jayasuriya show. On his 39th birthday, Jayasuriya bludgeoned 130 runs off 88 balls. He added 201 with Sangakkara in only 27.5 overs where Sangakkara scored 121 runs. With that Sanath Jayasuriya became the third player to score a century on the birthday after Vinod Kambli and Tendulkar.

However, Sri Lanka lost the next match against India, both teams met again in the Asia Cup final. Sri Lanka lost four wickets for 61 runs, where veteran Jayasuriya started his blistering batting along with Dilshan. Jayasuriya scored his 27th ODI century and lift the total for 273. Having not seen Mendis before, India had a nightmare in the chase, Though they started the chase very good with Virender Sehwag scored 36-ball 60 until Mendis come into the scene. Mendis took 6 wickets for 13 runs by recording the best bowling figures in an Asia Cup final. Sri Lanka lifted the fourth Asia Cup title and Mendis won both man of the match and player of the series awards.

2009 Lahore attack

On 3 March 2009, the Sri Lankan team's convoy was attacked in Lahore, Pakistan by gunmen. This led to the death of five policemen and injuries to seven cricketers and a member of the coaching team. The team was on its way to the Gaddafi Stadium where they were scheduled to begin the third day of the Second Test. After the incident, the test match was called off by the Sri Lankan Cricket board. Sri Lanka had agreed to tour Pakistan, replacing India who refused to do so citing security concerns.

Six Pakistani policemen and two civilians were killed in the attack. Samaraweera and Paranavitana were hospitalised following the incident. The others had sustained minor injuries and shrapnel wounds. Samaraweera sustained shrapnel wounds to his thigh, and Paranavitana to his chest. The team's Assistant Coach Paul Farbrace was also injured. Although it was reported that Coach Trevor Bayliss also sustained minor injuries,

2009 ICC World Twenty20

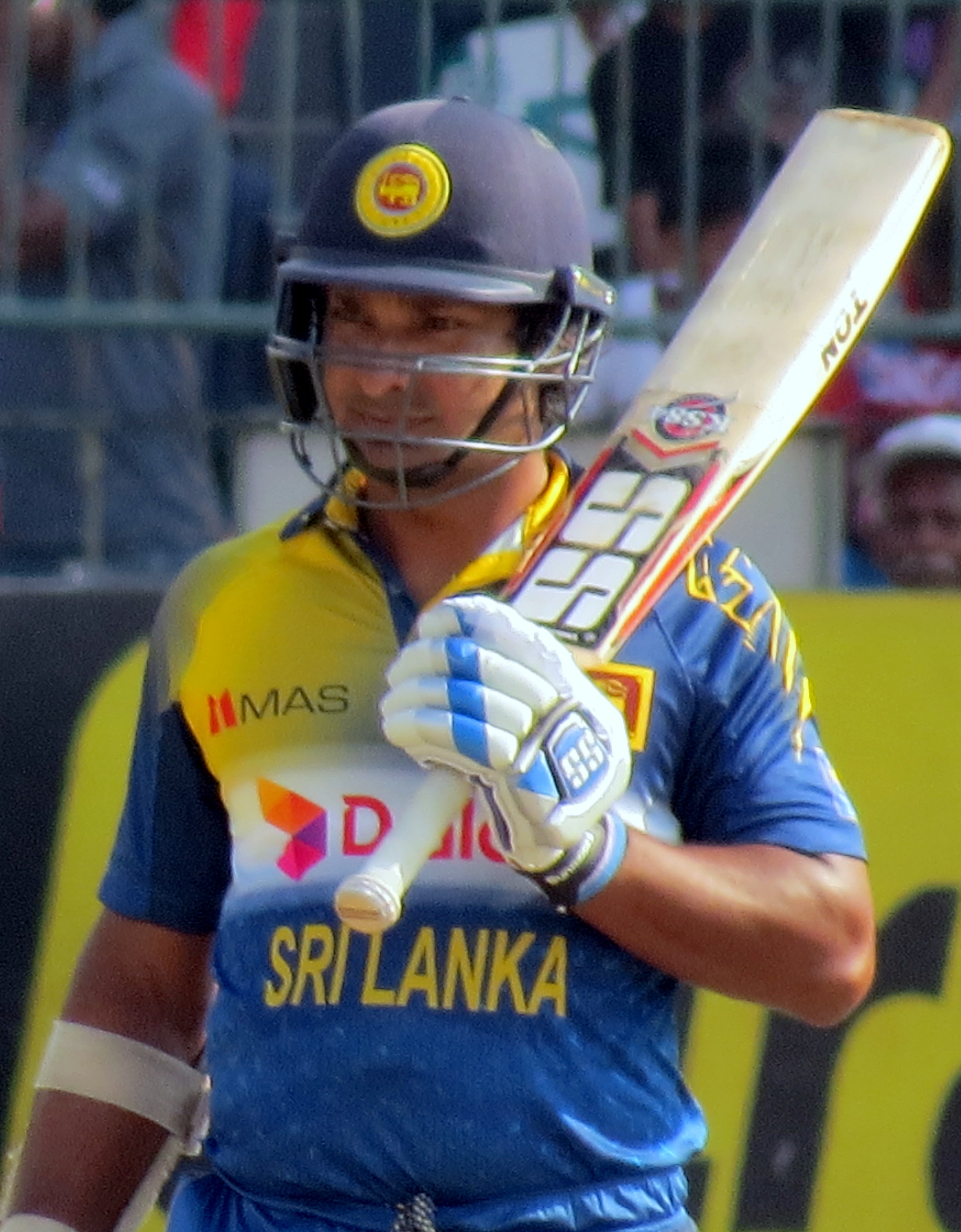
Kumar Sangakkara was Sri Lankan captain between 2009 and 2011

The second T20 tournament was given England to host. Kumar Sangakkara led the Sri Lankan team in the tournament. Within Group C, they played with West Indies and Australia. Sri Lanka gain prominence in World Twenty20 arena with this series. Against Australia, Sri Lanka won by 6 wickets, eliminating Australia for the first time from group stage in a major tournament. Ajantha Mendis took 3 wickets, and in batting, skipper Sangakkara scored unbeaten 55. Next match was with West Indies, who were in poor performance in the T20 cricket. Sri Lanka batted first scored 192/5 courtesy of blistering 81 runs from Jayasuriya. Tillakaratne Dilshan, who was promoted to open the batting with Jayasuriya, gain attention from the crowd, due to his innovative stroke play. The shot he played above the Wicket-keeper's head, came to known as "Dilscoop". He played the shot in almost every match in this series, which earned him good runs. West Indies only scored 177/5 in 20 overs and Sri Lanka through to the Super 8s.

Pakistan, New Zealand, and Ireland played with Sri Lanka in Group F of Super 8s. Against Pakistan, Sri Lanka won the match by 19 runs. Dilshan scored 46 runs with some innovative Dilscoops. Against Ireland, Sri Lanka won by 9 runs, where Irish players came hard at Lankan bowlers. In the last Super 8 match, Sri Lanka beat New Zealand by 48 runs. Dilshan played another 48 runs and Mendis took 3/9 in the bowling. The semi-final was against West Indies for the second time in the tournament, where Sri Lanka scored 158/5 in their 20 overs. Dilshan scored another blistering knock with 96 unbeaten runs. He was just a boundary behind to score first T20I century by a Sri Lankan. Dilshan scored 60.76% of Sri Lanka's runs, which was then a new Twenty20 International record. However, this only stood for a matter of hours, as Chris Gayle scored 62.38% of West Indies' total. West Indies scored just 101 all out in their 20 overs. Angelo Mathews proved his ability also with the ball, where he took first 3 wickets of West Indian top order. Sri Lanka easily moved to their first T20 International final. However, Mahela ended the tournament as highest run scorer with 302 runs.

In the final at Lord's, Sri Lanka won the toss and elected to bat. The first over was bowled by Mohammad Amir. After failing to score off the first four balls – all short – Dilshan went for his scoop and mistimed it, resulting in him being caught at short fine-leg. Soon after this, Mubarak top edged a delivery by Abdul Razzaq which went high in the air and was caught by Shahzaib Hasan, leaving Sri Lanka at 2 for 2. Jayasuriya was able to stabilise the innings for Sri Lanka hitting 17 runs off 10 balls, however, Jayasuriya soon fell as he dragged a good length ball back on to the stumps. Jayawardene followed after edging a shot into the hands of Misbah-ul-Haq, leaving Sri Lanka on 32/4. Sangakkara and Chamara Silva added further runs, before the latter was caught by Saeed Ajmal playing a pull shot off the bowling of Umar Gul. Pakistani captain Afridi soon after, took the wicket of Isuru Udana with a googly which drifted into the right-hander, knocking the off-stump. This brought in Mathews, who along with Sangakkara took the score from 70/6 to 138/6, with 17 runs being scored off the last over bowled by Mohammad Amir. Sri Lanka finished on 138/6 from 20 overs.

Pakistan started off well with openers Kamran Akmal and Shahzaib Hasan adding 48 run for the 1st wicket, before Kamran Akmal was stumped by Sangakkara by the first delivery of Jayasuriya. Pakistan reached the target in 18.4 overs, with Shahid Afridi, who hit the winning runs, earning Man of the Match while Tillakaratne Dilshan was declared Man of the Series for his 317 runs at an average of 63.40.

== 2010s ==
2010 ICC World Twenty20

Although the tournament was held every two years beginning in 2007, the scheduled ICC Champions Trophy ODI tournament to be held in the West Indies in 2010 was revised to a Twenty20 format because the 2008 ICC Champions Trophy tournament in Pakistan was postponed due to security concerns and there was a need to correct the international cricketing tournament calendar. This ICC World Twenty20 took place only 10 months after the last one.

In this third T20I occasion, Sri Lanka was again led by Kumar Sangakkara. Sri Lanka was in Group B with New Zealand and Zimbabwe. The first match was with New Zealand, where Sri Lanka scored only 135/6 with 81 of Jayawardene. In chasing, New Zealand were shaky in the start, but Jesse Ryder recovered the match to their way with 27 ball 42 runs. At the end, New Zealand won by 2 wickets, with a six scored by Nathan McCullum to Chaminda Vaas in last over.

In next match, Mahela scored first T20 International century which is scored by a Sri Lankan, against Zimbabwe. He reached one hundred with 64 balls. With this century he became the fourth man in all T20 Internationals, and the third in the ICC World Twenty20 Cricket history to score a century. Zimbabwe came to the crease to chase 173 of Lankans, but rain interrupted when they were 29/1 in 5 overs. With this Sri Lanka won the match by 14 in D/L method.

In Super 8 stage at Group F, Sri Lanka won against West Indies by 57 runs. In this match, Mahela came very close to score his second consecutive century but overs ended when he was not out in 98. In the next match against Australia, Sri Lanka lost the match by 81 runs. Against Indian in the next match, India scored 163/5, where Sri Lanka chased the scored with only 5 wickets down. With 2 wins and 1 loss, Sri Lanka selected for their second consecutive T20I World Cup semi-finals. This time with England. Sri Lanka batted first, but couldn't reach even 150 mark. They scored 128 runs only. Sri Lankan hopes came fade with this performance, where Kevin Pietersen (42 from 26 balls) attacked Sri Lankan bowling line-up. He took the match away from Lankans, and England finally won by 7 wickets to reach the final.

2010 Asia Cup

The tenth edition of Asia Cup was held in June 2010 in Sri Lanka. Only the four test playing nations were participated. Sri Lanka was led by Kumar Sangakkara. In the match against Pakistan, Sri Lanka scored 242 runs with the fifties from Angelo Mathews and Mahela Jayawardene. In bowling, Malinga ripped off Salman Butt for naught and Pakistan were 34 for 4 at one stage. With the century from Shahid Afridi, Pakistan came back strongly, until Malinga's deadly yorkers scattered the stumps of tail enders. Sri Lanka won the match by 16 runs and Malinga took a five-wicket haul in the match. Second match was against Bangladesh. Tillakaratne Dilshan all but scuttled Bangladesh's hopes of staying competitive in the Asia Cup. With Dilshan's half century, Sri Lanka posted 312 runs, which was recorded as the first ever 300+ total in Rangiri Dambulla soil. Dilshan took 3 wickets in the match and Sri Lanka won the match by 126 runs and helped earn Sri Lanka a bonus point. In the match against India, Farveez Maharoof took his maiden five-wicket haul. Maharoof took a hat-trick, during a period of play when four wickets fell for no runs for India. They ended up 209 runs and Sri Lanka won the match by 7 wickets.

Both teams met again in the final. Indian captain MS Dhoni won the toss and elected to bat first. Gautam Gambhir and Dinesh Karthik gave India a promising start but Gambhir was soon dismissed at 30 with India reeling at 38/1. Then Virat Kohli and Karthik put up a partnership of 62 runs after which Kohli was caught by Kumar Sangakkara behind the wickets. India managed to score 268/6 in their 50 overs with Sri Lanka needing 269 runs to win the championship. Sri Lankan chase was a slow start with Dilshan caught in the first over. First five wickets fell off in quick succession within the score of 50 runs. After this, a promising partnership developed between Thilina Kandamby and Chamara Kapugedera of 53-runs, which seemed to bring back Sri Lankan hopes in the match. But after the fall of this partnership, Sri Lanka never managed to recover and were all out for a score of 187 in 44.4 overs. India won the match by 81 runs, and with it, the Asia Cup after 15 years.

2011 Cricket World Cup

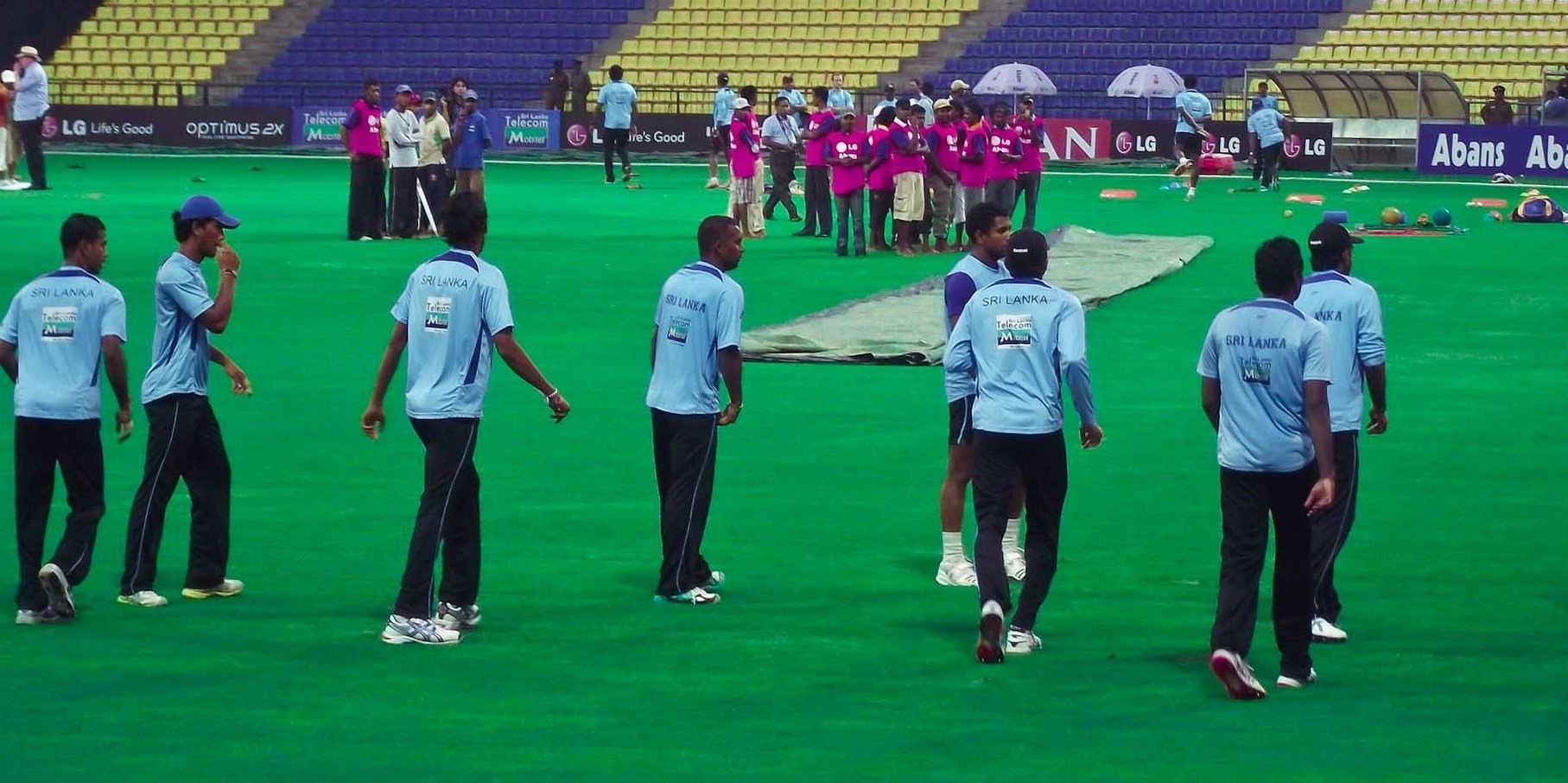
Sri Lanka Cricket Team practicing at Pallekele

India, Bangladesh and Sri Lanka jointly hosted the 10th edition of Cricket World Cup. Kumar Sangakkara led the Sri Lankan side. In group A, Sri Lanka played with Pakistan, Australia, New Zealand, Zimbabwe, Canada and Kenya. They started off their tournament against minnows Canada. They won the toss and elected to bat first. Canada bowled well in the early overs, but did not get a wicket, as openers Tharanga and Dilshan reached 50 runs. When the first wicket did fall, it was a run-out when the batsmen had a mix-up with the score at 63, and Tharanga was dismissed. Dilshan got to his half-century, but fell trying to go for a big hit. The Canadians restricted Sri Lanka to 88/2 with over 19 overs bowled; but the two experienced Sri Lankan batsmen, captain Sangakkara and Jayawardene came together and got a partnership of 50. Both batsmen got the run rate to over 6 and both seemed to be coasting to their centuries, until Sangakkara on 92 gave a simple return catch to John Davison with the score at 267/2. Jayawardene reached his century but fell immediately afterwards. More wickets fell and the game got hot-tempered, with a confrontation between Angelo Mathews and Harvir Baidwan and Sri Lanka finished with 332/7.

The Canadian chase went nowhere, with Thisara Perera and Nuwan Kulasekara getting three wickets quickly. Captain Ashish Bagai tried to lead a recovery, but once Perera took his wicket to reduce Canada to 53/5, all doubts about the result finished. Big-hitter Rizwan Cheema took 37, including two huge sixes off spinner Murali, but the latter ultimately got his wicket as Canada fell to 122 all out. Sri Lanka won the match by 210 runs.

Next match was with Pakistani team, which gave Lankans their first World Cup defeat in home soil. Pakistan captain Shahid Afridi won the toss and decided to bat first against Sri Lanka, one of the pre-tournament favorites. Sri Lanka got the wicket of Ahmed Shehzad in the sixth over, but Pakistan still managed to proceed along at a rapid run rate in the first ten overs. Mohammed Hafeez, proceeded along at over a run a ball until a mix up with Kamran Akmal had him run out, and Kamran himself was stumped a few overs later to leave the match evenly poised at 105/3 in the 21st over. Younis Khan and Misbah-ul-Haq then built a 104 run partnership in 20 overs without taking too many risks, until Younis fell to Rangana Herath for 72 while trying to accelerate. Misbah stayed not out till the end for a well made 83, kept Pakistan to 277/7 at the end.

Sri Lanka started off with a very good reply, with their openers Tharanga and Dilshan accelerating steadily after a slow start to add 76 in just over 14 overs until Hafeez had Tharanga caught at point. This was the turning point of the match, as three more wickets, including that of Dilshan fell soon after to leave Sri Lanka tottering at 96/4. Sangakkara rode his luck with Kamran missing two stumpings off him, and staged a recovery with Chamara Silva, but his luck eventually ran out as the required run rate went up, with Afridi having him caught at long on one short of his fifty. Jayawadena was bowled by pacer Shoaib Akhtar with a magnificent in swing. Silva struggled to time the ball early in his innings, being 16 off 49 balls at one point, but he then accelerated rapidly to reach his half-century, but Afridi returned to remove dangerous looking Angelo Mathews. Silva eventually fell for 57 when Kamran did get a stumping right, and despite Kulasekara's cameo, Sri Lanka ended up 11 short.

In the next match against Kenyans, Malinga took a hat-trick, the second in his career. He became the first bowler to take two World Cup hat-tricks, and the fourth bowler to take two career ODI hat-tricks. Sri Lanka comfortably chased the target of 146 by giving one wicket only.

Sri Lanka against Australia match was abandoned due to heavy rain. In the next match against Zimbabwe, Tharanga and Dilshan set a new World Cup record for the opening partnership, scoring 282 runs, beating the previous record of 194. It was also the first occasion in a World Cup that both openers made a century. With their victory over Zimbabwe, Sri Lanka became the first team to qualify for the quarter-finals of the tournament. In reply, Zimbabwe made a good start, but were dismissed for 188 runs with 11 overs spare. As in previous wins against New Zealand, this New Zealand vs Sri Lanka match was not a surprising one, because Lankans were the better ones to win the match even before the match. Skipper Sangakkara scored 111 runs and Lankans got 265/9. Blackcaps struggled from the very first ball, where they were all out for 153.

In the quarterfinals, Sri Lankan counterpart was England. England total of 229 was easily reached by Dilshan and Tharanga. Both made centuries as Sri Lanka chased down a target by ten wickets. This run chase set a new record for the highest successful run chase in a ten-wicket victory in ODI history. Sri Lanka qualified easily for the semi-finals. In the semi-finals, for a second consecutive time, Sri Lanka defeated New Zealand in the semi-finals of the World Cup and made it to the finals. This match marked the last match Murali played on Sri Lankan soil. Sri Lanka won the match by 5 wickets and reached their first consecutive World Cup final, this time against India.

Sri Lanka started the innings slowly, constrained by good bowling from Zaheer and committed fielding from Yuvraj Singh, Suresh Raina, and Virat Kohli inside the 30-yard circle. Zaheer began with three consecutive maidens and the wicket of Tharanga, conceding only six runs in his five-over spell. Dilshan was bowled by Harbhajan when a delivery carried on to the stumps after deflecting off his gloves. Sangakkara came in after Tharanga's dismissal, and was building a solid foundation with Dilshan before the latter was dismissed. Jayawardene came to the crease when Sri Lanka were 60/2 in the 17th over. Sangakkara and Mahela went about the task of consolidating the innings, but eventually Sangakkara was caught behind by Dhoni at 48. New batsman Thilan Samaraweera was adjudged not out by the umpire when a ball hit his thigh pad off the bowling of Yuvraj Singh. The Indians decided to review the decision and he was ultimately given out. Chamara Kapugedera, who was playing his first World Cup match, was caught off a deceptive slower ball by Zaheer Khan. Jayawardene, meanwhile, continued with his quality batting, ultimately scoring 103 not out from 88 balls in a high-class batting display. Helped by the hard-hitting of Kulasekara and Thisara, Sri Lanka scored 91 runs in the last 10 overs, including 63 in the batting powerplay (45–50 overs) to take the score to 274/6.

India had a shaky start, with Sehwag and Tendulkar both early by Malinga, leaving them struggling at 31 for two. Kohli and Gautam Gambhir started the recovery with some fluent stroke play and quick running between wickets, taking India to 114 before Kohli was caught-and-bowled by Dilshan for 35. When he was on 30, Gambhir mistimed a shot off the bowling of Suraj Randiv, sending the ball high up in the air, but Kulasekara could not hold on to a difficult chance at long off. Kohli and Gambhir put together an 83-run partnership before Kohli's dismissal. Dhoni came in after Kohli to bat at number five. Gambhir and Dhoni added 109 for the fourth wicket with Gambhir scoring 97. Gambhir tried to finish his century with a boundary, but was bowled by Thisara. Following Gambhir's dismissal, 52 runs were required off 52 balls. Yuvraj and Dhoni took India to victory, and Dhoni sealed the match hitting a six off Kulasekara, when only 4 runs were required off 11 balls. Dhoni finished on 91 not out from 79 deliveries. With this defeat, Sri Lanka lost their second consecutive World Cup final defeat in ODIs. After the match, Murali retired from all international cricket at the greatest spin bowler ever in world cricket.

2012 Asia Cup

The eleventh edition of Asia Cup was held in Bangladesh. Only four test playing nations were participated. The series was highlighted as a black mark in Sri Lanka's Asia Cup history. Mahela Jayawardene led the team which seemed to be a powerful line up. In the first match, Sri Lanka lost to India by 50 runs. Sangakkara and Jayawardene scored fifties, but it was not enough to overcome the century scored by Indian Virat Kohli. In the second match against Pakistan, Sri Lanka bowled out for 188 runs where 7 batsmen got out for single digit scores. Sangakkara scored 71 runs and Upul Tharanga, who was pushed to 6th batting position scored a fifty. Pakistan chased down the target in 40th over with a bonus point. Sri Lanka played final pool game against Bangladesh, where Bangladesh won the match by 5 wickets in D/L method. Again, Sri Lanka's top order collapsed where middle order rebuilt the innings up to respectable total of 232. Sri Lanka failed to qualify for the final of the Asia Cup for the first time. It is also the eighth time in Asia and the second time in multi-team tournaments in the subcontinent that Sri Lanka have failed to win a single match.

2012 ICC World Twenty20

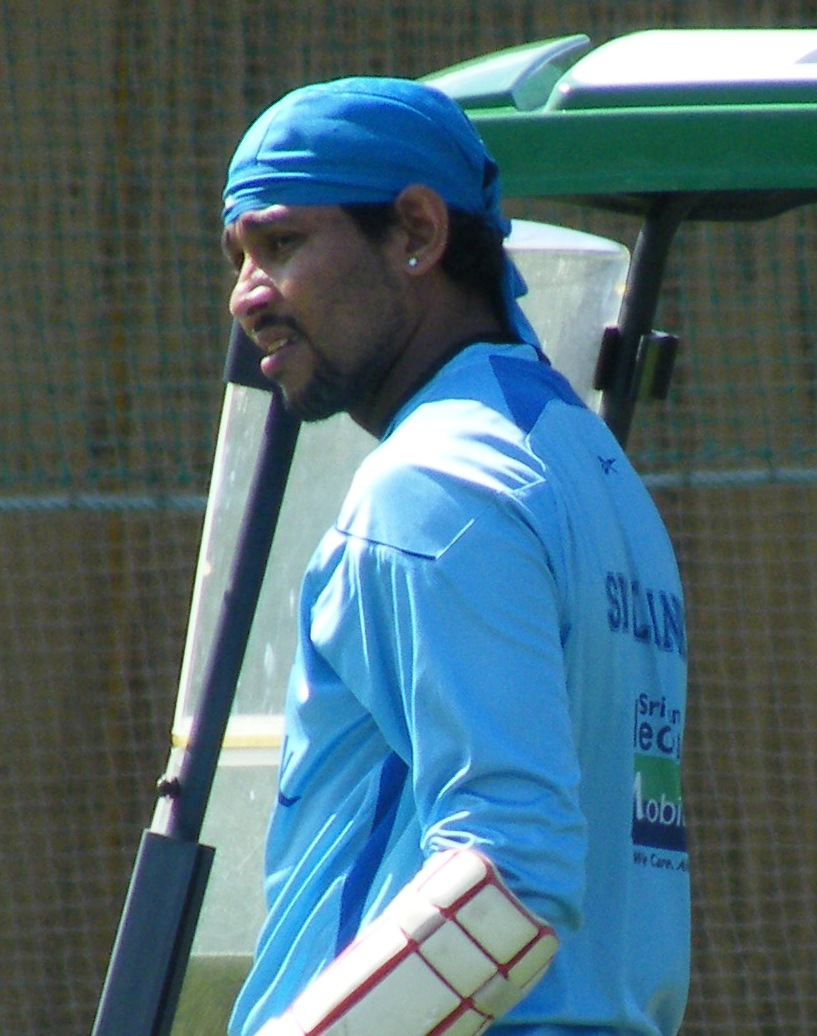
Tillakaratne Dilshan was Sri Lankan captain between 2011 and 2012

Finally, Sri Lanka hosted a World T20 after being the runner-up in 2011 Cricket World Cup. This is the 2012 ICC World Twenty20 tournament held in an Asian country, the last three having been held in South Africa, England and the West Indies. Sri Lankan pacer Lasith Malinga has been chosen as the event ambassador of the tournament by ICC. Sri Lanka was led by Mahela Jayawarderna for the second time after 2007 World Twenty20. Sri Lanka played in Group C with South Africa and Zimbabwe. All group matches were held in Hambantota.

The first match of the tournament was between the Hosts and Zimbabwe. Zimbabwe won the toss and put Sri Lanka in to bat. They finished with 182/4 in 20 overs, giving a huge task for their opponents. Zimbabwe came to the crease, but didn't take too long to be dismissed for 100 runs on the board. Ajantha Mendis was all over the vultures, where he took 6 wickets for 8 runs, giving Sri Lanka an 82 run victory. This is the best bowling figures in Twenty20 International history, that was previously also held by Mendis against Aussies with 6 for 13.

In the next against Proteas, rain interrupted in numerous occasions, which gave only 7 over per side match. South Africa batted first and AB de Villiers smashed 30 runs from 13 balls, where they finished with 78/4 in 7 overs. Sri Lanka was not good at all, only scored 46/5, no any batsmen scored more than 15 runs. South Africa won the match by 32 runs, which is a huge margin in T20s. However, both team qualified for the Super 8s.

Sri Lanka played in Group 1 with West Indies, England, and New Zealand. Against New Zealand, the match was tied, where both teams scored 174. But, Sri Lanka had good chance to win the match, wickets in last over and misunderstandings gave a tied game. However, Sri Lanka won the Super Over and won the match. In the next two matches, Sri Lanka won very easily against West Indies and England.

The Sri Lankan third consecutive World T20 semi-final was against Pakistanis. Sri Lanka scored 139/4, where Mahela paced the innings with his 42 runs. While chasing, skipper Mohammad Hafeez scored 40 runs, all the other players were undone by Rangana Herath. The 16 runs victory gave Sri Lankans to win their first T20 title, which was against West Indies.

After Chris Gayle, who had decimated Australia in the semifinals, was dismissed for just 3 to leave the West Indies at 2-14 after 5.5 overs, Marlon Samuels produced 78 from 55 balls, including the longest six of the tournament at 108 meters. Captain Darren Sammy also led a late charge that produced 108 runs in the latter 10 overs to set Sri Lanka a target of 138. They then restricted Sri Lanka to 39/1 after eight overs, produced two run outs and held each Sri Lankan batsman to no more than 33 (posted by captain Mahela Jayawardene). Kulasekara mustered a brief fightback (26 runs from 16 balls) but holed out to leave the tail end exposed, and Sri Lanka was soon all out 36 runs short. Samuels earned Man of the Match honours for being the top-scoring batsman on either side while also taking 1–15 in his four overs of bowling. For the first time, a host nation (Sri Lanka) competed in the final of the ICC World Twenty20. Ajantha Mendis was the highest wicket-taker with 15 wickets.

2014 Asia Cup

The twelfth edition of Asia Cup was held in Bangladesh with the participation of four test playing nations and Associate member Afghanistan. After a disastrous previous Asia Cup in 2012, Sri Lanka went to the tournament with many bilateral ODI series wins. Angelo Mathews captained the team, with permanent opener Tillakaratne Dilshan pulled out from the series due to injury. In the first match, Sri Lanka defeated Pakistan by 12 runs courtesy of five wicket haul by Malinga. In batting, new opener Lahiru Thirimanne scored a magnificent hundred. Malinga took his 250th ODI wicketat 163 matches and became the fastest Sri Lankan to achieve the milestone. In the next match, Sangakkara scored an under-pressure 83-ball century to help Sri Lanka beat India by two wickets. Ajantha Mendis took four wickets for 60 runs in his comeback match.

In the next match, Sangakkara continued his sublime form in the Asia Cup to guide Sri Lanka to a massive 129-run win over Afghanistan. This was the first encounter between the two team in international level as well. With this win, Sri Lanka qualified for the Asia Cup final. Sri Lanka defeated Bangladesh by 3 wickets in their final pool game. Bangladesh scored 204 runs after batting first. Sri Lanka had a shaky start, when Kusal Perera gone for duck in the second ball of the first over. At one stage, Sri Lanka were 75 for 5, until Angelo Mathews and Chaturanga de Silva added match winning partnership for the sixth wicket.

In the final against Pakistan, Sri Lanka were the favorites to win the title. Pakistan batted first and scored 260 runs with the held of Fawad Alam's unbeaten century. Malinga took his sixth ODI five-wicket haul, which was also the third against Pakistan. Sri Lankan openers contributed with 56-run partnership until Kusal Perera stumped for Saeed Ajmal. In the very next ball, Ajmal took the wicket of Sangakkara, by handing a golden duck. Then Jayawardene along with Thirimanne had a 156-run partnership guiding the team to victory. Thirimanne scored 101 runs and Sri Lanka won the match and Asia Cup by 5 wickets. Thirimanne finished as the highest run scorer of the series with 279 runs and won the player of the series award. Malinga became the highest wicket taker with 11 wickets and won the man of the match award in the final.

2014 ICC World Twenty20

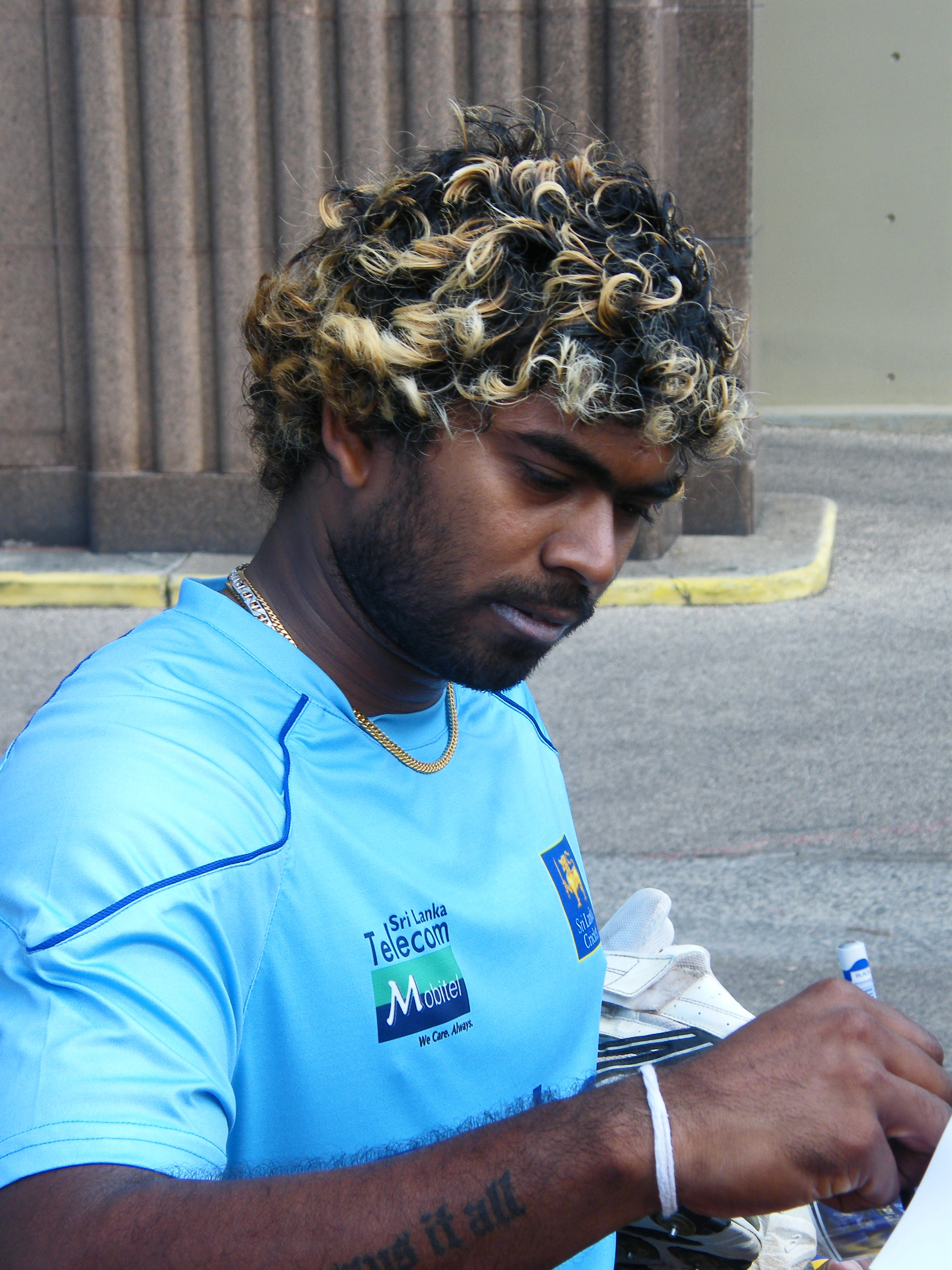
Lasith Malinga was Sri Lankan captain between 2014 and 2016 in Twenty20 Internationals who won 2014 ICC World Twenty20

As the runner-up of previous World T20 competition, Sri Lanka went Bangladesh under the captaincy of Dinesh Chandimal to 2014 ICC World Twenty20. In the group stage at Super 10 stage, they played with South Africa, New Zealand, England, and Netherlands. In the first match, Sri Lanka played with South Africa. Sri Lanka won the toss and elected to bat first. They had a good understanding about Bangladeshi pitches, due to Bangladesh bilateral tournament and 2014 Asia Cup, which was held prior to the World T20 at the same site. Sri Lankan opener Kusal Perera reminded all sorts of aggressive shots by legendary Sanath Jayasuriya. Kusal's master stroke was a photocopy of Jayasuriya and he devastated Dale Steyn, Morné Morkel, and Lonwabo Tsotsobe. He scored 61 runs off 40 balls giving Sri Lanka a total of 165/7. South Africans was not down as yet, where they progressively built the innings. With the wickets in crucial intervals, they ended up in the losing side with 5 runs short. Kusal was the Man-of-the-Match.

The next match was against Netherlands, which showed their powerful strokes against Ireland in this tournament. But all those stroke plays were undone by bowling by Mathews, Kulasekara, and Malinga. Netherlands team was all out for 39 runs, which is the lowest by any team in a T20I match. Sri Lanka chased this easy target within 5 overs, which also earns biggest victory in terms of balls remaining in all T20I.

In the very next match against England, beat Sri Lanka by 6 wickets with courtesy of unbeaten 116 by Alex Hales. Sri Lanka batted first and scored 189/4. Mahela scored 89 runs. England always maintained the required run rate very well, which gave them a fast hitting in last few overs. England scored 190/4 in 19.2 and won the match.

The last group match was a thrilling match for both teams, where Sri Lanka came as the favorites to win the match. Skipper Chandimal was out of play due to some injuries, so Lasith Malinga captained the match. By batting first, Sri Lanka scored only 119 all out, Mahela scored 25 runs as the best batsman. Blackcaps came to the crease as the favorites to win the match, because 120 is not a huge task at all to them as smashers - Brendon McCullum, Martin Guptill, Ross Taylor, and Corey Anderson. During the match, Anderson was injured and so New Zealand played with only 10 players in batting. New Zealand started pretty well with Guptill and Kane Williamson. At this time, Malinga decided to go with Rangana Herath, who turned the match in nowhere. Herath ball Guptill and he lunges forward to push to mid-on. Sets off for a single straight away but his partner is not at all interested. The bowler is wise to the mistake, rushes across to his right and cuts the ball in its path and sends in a rocket throw and Sangakkara whips the bails off. After this run-out, it wall all Herath. He stumped skipper McCullum, then caught Ross Taylor to lbw. Next, Herath bowled James Neesham in first ball he faced. He then captured Luke Ronchi for lbw, and New Zealand were never in the game. Finally New Zealand all out for just 60 runs, which is the lowest score by a test playing nation in Twenty20 Internationals. Herath finished with 5 wickets for 3 runs, earned him Man-of-the-match. With this win, Sri Lanka moved their fourth consecutive World T20 semi-finals.

The semi-finals was against defending World T20 champions- West Indies. Malinga again led the team. But this time, Lankans were all over West Indies, where Sri Lanka scored 160/6. In chasing, West Indies was 80/4 when rain came into play. Rain and hail ended the match after 13.5 overs in the West Indies' innings. Their par score was 107 runs according to the Duckworth–Lewis method. So, Sri Lanka won by 27 runs in D/L method. At the presentation, West Indies skipper Darren Sammy stated that, "rain and god gave Sanga and Mehela" a big farewell party. This World Cup belongs to them. So, good luck to both of them". The final was not easy at all, with their opposition being a difficult one - India. The match was led by Malinga for third time, where he gave permanent T20I captaincy.

Sri Lanka and India had played each other over sixty times in the last seven years, with India winning the majority of the matches. During the tournament India was the only unbeaten team heading into the final, whereas Sri Lanka had lost a group match to England. Despite this, statistically there had been little between the two teams during the tournament. India, sent into bat by Sri Lanka after they won the toss, posted 130 runs in their 20 overs. Virat Kohli top scored with 77, but Yuvraj Singh's 11 runs off 21 balls slowed the innings momentum in the final overs. Malinga and Kulasekara showcased outstanding death bowling, where Kohli and Dhoni could not capitalize. Sri Lanka reached 134 runs in 17.5 overs with the loss of 4 wickets. Kumar Sangakkara, playing his last Twenty20 international match, guided Sri Lanka home with an unbeaten 52 runs. Sangakkara was named Player of the Match, while Kohli was named Player of the Tournament. After all losses in major World Cups in 4 times, Sri Lanka finally ended with Champions. With this match, Mahela and Sanga retired from twenty20 internationals. The words of Sammy became true at last.

2015 Cricket World Cup

The World cup was hosted by Australia and New Zealand in 2015. Sri Lanka was captained by Angelo Mathews. The first match was against New Zealand, where Blackcaps scored a huge total of 331/6 with blasted innings of Corey Anderson. Sri Lanka opened with very well, but the wickets in crucial intervals gave them a backward push. Lahiru Thirimanne scored 65 runs, and finally Sri Lanka bowled out for 233, with 98 runs lost at the end.

The next match was against debut World Cup contestants- Afghanistan. Afghanistan got off to a solid start before both their openers were dismissed off consecutive overs and the score read 40/2 in the tenth over. Asghar Stanikzai and Samiullah Shenwari built a steady third-wicket partnership which was broken when Afghanistan had reached 128 in the 28th over. Following this, Afghanistan started losing wickets at regular intervals to the Sri Lankan pace bowlers before finally being bowled out for 232 in 49.4 overs. Malinga and Mathews picked 3 wickets each for Sri Lanka.

Sri Lanka's innings got off to a disastrous start as both openers fell for ducks within the second over, which was the second time in ODI history where this has occurred. Then in the sixth over, they lost the wicket of Sangakkara with the score at 18/3. They slipped into further trouble when Dimuth Karunaratne was dismissed in the 12th over with the Sri Lankan total still at 51. Then the maestro Jayawardene came to the crease. He and Mathews then added 126 runs for the fifth wicket and Mathews was run out for 44 and Jayawardene was dismissed soon after completing his 19th ODI hundred. Thisara, who came in to bat with Sri Lanka in a precarious position of 178/6, struck an unbeaten 47 from 26 balls to guide his team to a four-wicket win with ten balls to spare.

Against Bangladesh, Sri Lanka off to a flier with magnificent hundreds by Dilshan (161*) and Sangakkara (105*). With this century, Dilshan broke the earlier record of highest individual score by a Sri Lankan in World Cups by Aravinda (144). This century is also the highest individual score in an ODI without hitting a six. Bangladesh only scored 240/10 and Sri Lanka won the match by 92 runs.

Next match was against British men, where English captain Eoin Morgan won the toss and elected to bat first. England openers started solidly, but, from 62/0, the innings was reduced to 101/3 in the 21st over. Joe Root and Morgan added 60 runs for the 4th wicket before the dismissal of Morgan. The fifth wicket partnership between Root and James Taylor yielded 98 runs in 11 overs. Taylor fell for 25, following which Root was also dismissed for a 108-ball 121. England were 265/6 in the 47th over, before Jos Buttler struck an unbeaten 39 in 19 balls to take the total to 309/6 at the end of 50 overs.

Sri Lankan innings began with Thirimanne being dropped on 3. His opening partner Dilshan was out for 44 immediately after their partnership had reached 100 runs. Sangakkara joined Thirimanne and the left-hand duo punished the England bowlers with each of the batsmen making hundreds. Thirimanne struck a six off the third ball of the 48th over to complete an emphatic 9-wicket victory. Thirimanne remained unbeaten on a 143-ball 139, while Sangakkara won the Man of the Match for his unbeaten 117 off just 86 balls. This was Sangakkara second consecutive century.

The match against Australians was a real thriller. Australia batted first where they posted a huge 376/9, with the help of brutal 51 ball century of Glenn Maxwell. Sri Lanka chasing was not good at first, where Thirimanne was got out early. but then Dilshan joined Sangakkara to a 196 run partnership. Dilshan hit six fours off an over, bowled by Mitchell Johnson, which was the first time this has happened in World Cup history. After dismissal of Dilshan, the middle-order failed to gain partnerships with Sangakkara, who batting really well. Sangakkara scored his third consecutive century. With Sanga's wicket, Sri Lanka lost wickets quickly and scored 312/9 in 50 overs. Australia won the match by 64 runs. In the last group stage match, Sri Lanka easily defeated Scotland by 148 runs. Sangakkara scored his fourth consecutive century by scoring 124 runs. He became the first batsman in ODI history to score 4 consecutive ODI centuries'. Sri Lanka scored 363/9. Scotland only scored 215 runs.

In the quarter-final, Sri Lanka met South Africans. The match was a shock to all the fans across the globe, where Sri Lanka scored 133 runs all out. Sanga scored 45 runs and all the others were struggled by South African impressive bowling attack- Dale Steyn, Morne Morkel and Imran Tahir. South Africa won the match very easily, only one wicket fell. With this match, Sanga and Jayawardena ended their ODI career. This match gave Lankans, their first defeat without making for the semi-finals after 1999 World Cup.

2016 Asia Cup

The 2016 Asia Cup was held in Bangladesh from 24 February to 6 March 2016. It was the 13th edition of the Asia Cup, the fifth to be held in Bangladesh, and the first to be played using the T20I format. This is due to Asian Cricket Council agreed to play Asia Cup in both ODI and T20I formats in rotational basis with the upcoming ICC major event. Four test playing nations with associate member UAE were participated to the tournament. Sri Lanka entered to the tournament as the defending champions from previous edition and champions of 2014 World Twenty20. They were the No.1 ranked team in T20I arena at the time. Lasith Malinga led the team in Asia Cup.

In the first match against UAE, Sri Lanka only managed to score 129 runs. It is their lowest total against an Associate nation in T20Is. However, with brilliant bowling by Malinga and Kulasekara, Sri Lanka won the match by 14 runs. Malinga took 4 for 26 and Kulasekara took 3 for 10 in the match. After the first match, Malinga was injured again and left out from the tournament. In the next match against Bangladesh, Sri Lanka lost by 23 runs. This was recorded as the first win by Bangladesh against Sri Lanka in T20Is. Sri Lanka lost to India and then to Pakistan very cheaply and removed from the Asia cup. During the tournament, Tillakaratne Dilshan became the first player to score 200 fours in T20Is.

2016 ICC World Twenty20

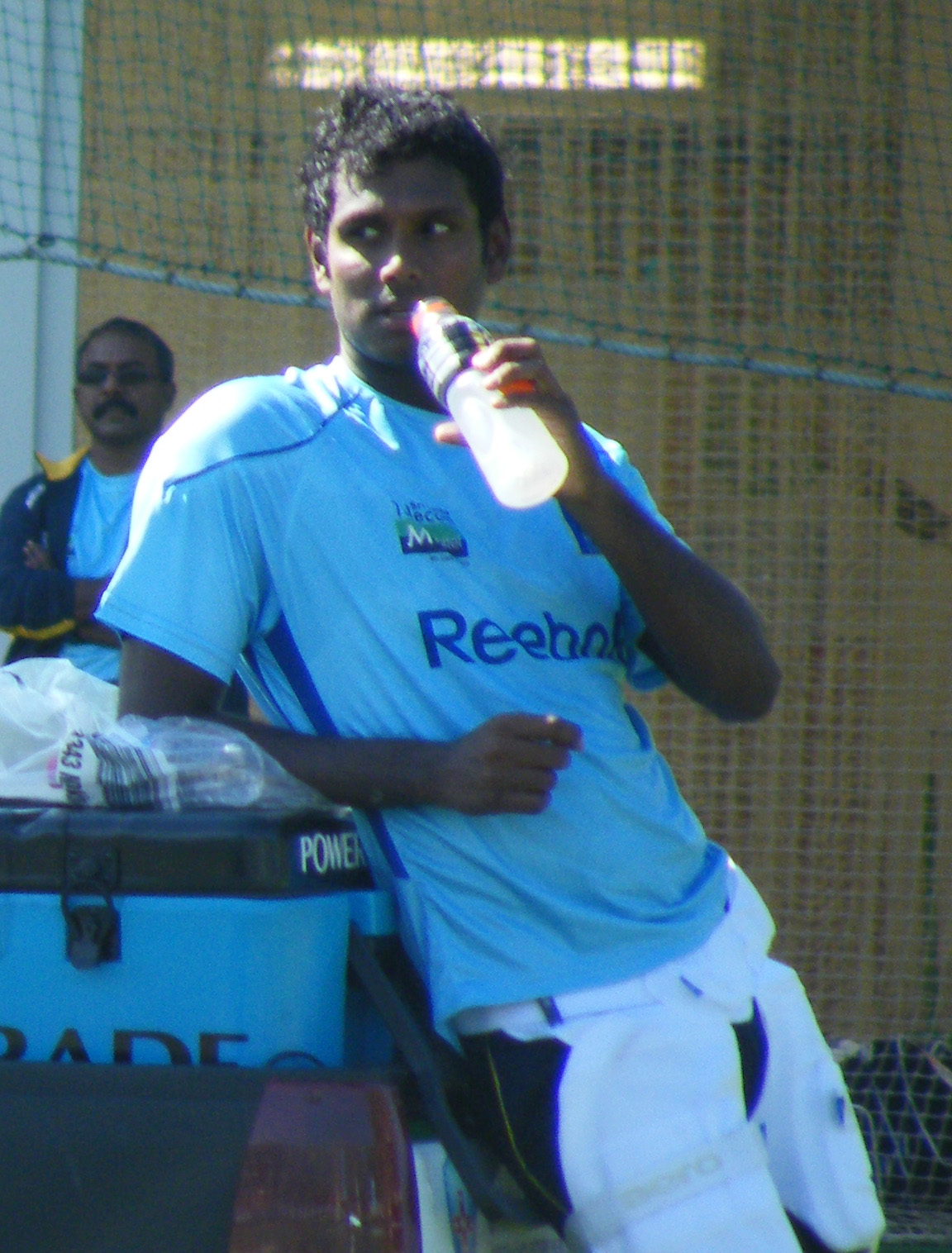
Angelo Mathews was the Sri Lankan captain between 2013 and 2017

One of the major upsets in Sri Lankan cricket history came during this World Twenty20 series, which was held in India. Prior to the World Twenty20, Sri Lanka played 5 cricket series but lost every series with single victory against West Indies (lost to Pakistan, New Zealand, India and 2016 Asia Cup). Permanent captain Lasith Malinga injured throughout all series, new Sri Lanka cricket selection committee appointed Angelo Mathews as the captain for World Twenty20, and Malinga eventually dropped from the squad quickly due to injury.

Lost both practice matches to New Zealand and Pakistan, Sri Lanka entered into the Super 10 stage as the underdogs, not as the defending champions. First match was against Afghanistan, where they batted first and scored 153/7 in 20 overs with brilliant fifty by afghan captain Asghar Stanikzai. Sri Lanka started the chasing with a magnificent start, where they took 41 runs in powerplay. Chandimal eventually got out for 18 runs and Thirimanne also backed him in to pavilion after scored 6 runs. Thisara Perera and Chamara Kapugedera scored some shots, but the key performance came from the veteran Tillakaratne Dilshan. He scored unbeaten 83 runs by 56 runs, guided the team to win first match in the series.

Second match was against West Indies, where they looked so strong in the group. Sri Lanka batted first and only managed to score 122/9 in 20 overs. Few poor umpire decision gone wrong way to the Lankans as well, where lbw decision for Dilshan was highly criticised by the commentators. West Indies came to the crease, where Gayle was not in the frame. With the fast start with Andre Fletcher, Windies won the match by 7 wickets.

Third and most important match in the group came against England. England batted first and scored 171/4 with Jos Buttler's magnificent fifty. Sri Lanka in the chase, again looked so poor, where 50 runs for 5 wickets after 9 overs. The defending champions were on the brink of a huge defeat in the match, Angelo Mathews came to the crease. He with Kapugedera smashed England spinner in all corners where the match went down to the wire at the end. With falling wickets in regular intervals, Sri Lanka lost the match by 10 runs at the end, where skipper Mathews played a gem of an innings with a hamstring injury. But his 54 ball 73 was not enough at the end and Sri Lanka along with South Africa were eliminated from the World Twenty20.

Last match for Sri Lanka was against South Africa, which was the match for the pride for both teams. Sri Lankan start was superb, where Chandimal and Dilshan easily hit through all areas with ease. But with Chandimal got out to Aaron Phangiso, Sri Lanka batting card falling one after the other. With 19.3 overs, Sri Lanka were all out for just 120 runs. South Africa won the match easily by 8 wickets at the end. Throughout the tournament, no any Sri Lankan batsmen has been successful, where veteran Dilshan's 83 was the highest by a Sri Lankan at this World Twenty20. The poor performances in all three departments gave their losses in the tour.

2016-2017 slump in all formats

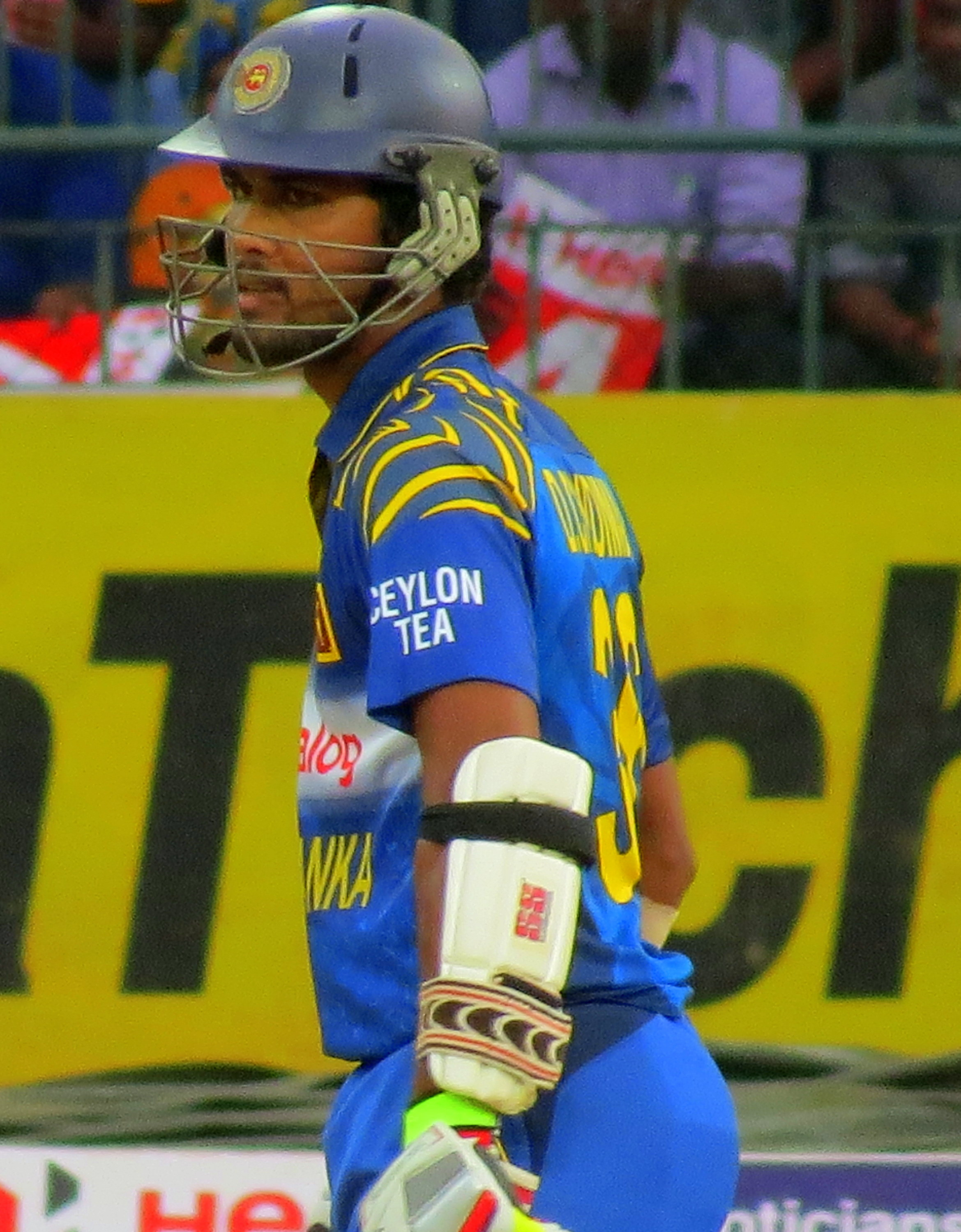
Dinesh Chandimal is Sri Lankan captain since 2017 to the present

Since the retirement of three legends (Sangakkara, Mahela and Dilshan), Sri Lankan strength collapsed in a regular manner. With the start of 2016-17 cricket season just after the 2016 ICC World Twenty20, Sri Lanka showed a clear decrease in all three formats of the game, hence moved deeper in the ICC Rankings. In the year 2017, Sri Lanka played 13 Tests, 29 ODIs and 15 T20Is. In 13 Tests, Sri Lanka won 4 and lost 7 matches. In 29 ODIs, Sri Lanka only won 5 and lost 23 matches including three 5-0 whitewashes. In 15 T20Is, they won 5 and lost 10 matches. At the start of 2017, Sri Lanka was in a tour for South Africa and already lost the test series. Sri Lanka won the T20I series 2–1, their first ever series win in any format in South Africa, despite South Africa have been rested many major players for the series. The ODI series was not so good however, where they faced a 5-0 whitewash.

After South Africa tour, Sri Lanka went Australia for a 3-match T20I series. With magical performances by newcomer Asela Gunaratne, Sri Lanka won the series 2–1. In March, Sri Lanka hosted Bangladesh for a full series, but things went wrong in their home soil. Test series was drawn 1-1, by giving Bangladesh, their first Test win against Sri Lanka. The ODI series was also drawn 1–1, whereas the T20I series also finished 1–1.

The biggest event in 2017 was 2017 ICC Champions Trophy. Sri Lanka competed in the group B along with India, Pakistan and South Africa. In the first match, South Africa won the match by 96 runs. Then in the second match, Sri Lanka won the match against India by recording Sri Lanka's joint-highest successful run-chase in ODIs and the highest successful run chase by any team in the history of the Champions Trophy. However against Pakistan, Sri Lanka lost the match and were eliminated, largely due to poor fielding performances.

After the Champions Trophy, Zimbabwe toured Sri Lanka and this time, Zimbabwe showcased their strength in ODI arena. Sri Lanka lost the series 3–2, giving Zimbabweans their first ever series win against Sri Lanka. The captaincy of Mathews was highly criticized after the loss and Mathews said that the defeat was "one of the lowest points in his career" and stepped down as captain of the team in all three formats the following day. Under the new captain Dinesh Chandimal, Sri Lanka won the one-off test by recording the highest successful run chase by any team in a Test in Asia, and the highest successful chase by Sri Lanka in Tests.

Sri Lanka then met India in a home series with some confidence with their latest test win and win against India in the Champions Trophy. But the all three formats went wrong for Sri Lanka, where they lost all 9 matches in the series, including 3 Tests, 5 ODIs and one-off T20I. Sri Lanka bagged many worst records in this series. The 5-0 ODI whitewash recorded as the first time Sri Lanka had suffered a whitewash at home in ODIs. Sri Lanka tried many captains throughout the series, but no one showed success.

With reduced performances in all formats and without many key players, Sri Lanka went to the UAE for a complete series against Pakistan. They only won the Test series 2–0, which was recorded as the first ever win by a visiting team against Pakistan in the UAE. The second Test match in the series was also the first day/night Test for Sri Lanka. The confidence booster in the test series did not passed to limited over internationals, where they suffered their third 5-0 ODI series whitewash as well. Sri Lanka became the first side to be whitewashed 5–0 three times in ODIs in the same calendar year, after previously losing to South Africa in January and India in August.

Sri Lanka's last fixture for 2017 was against India again but now in their home conditions. With the some fight in the Test series, India won the series 1–0 with two draws. With 12 consecutive defeats in ODI arena, Sri Lanka moved to Dharamsala for the 3-match ODI series. In the first ODI, Suranga Lakmal used swinging and seaming bowling performance to rip through Indian batting line-up to restrict them to 112, which is India's third-lowest in ODIs at home and their lowest at home when batting first. Sri Lanka finally won the match by 7 wickets. This win gave Lankans their first win after 12 consecutive ODI losses in 2017. The next two matches were belong to India, where Sri Lanka lost the series 2–1. India won the T20I series as well 3–0.

The year 2017 is highlighted as a black mark in Sri Lanka cricket in all three formats, specially in the ODI arena. They moved to number 7 and 8 in World Rankings. Many officials and players were continuously changed, where many players earned international debuts.

2018 Asia Cup

The 14th edition of Asia Cup was held in the UAE for the third time. Five test playing nations with Hong Kong were participated to the tournament. Sri Lanka added another black mark to their golden history and eliminated from the tournament within three days span. Angelo Mathews named as the captain of the team and veteran pacer Lasith Malinga was recalled for the ODI team after a year. Sri Lanka was in Group B along with Bangladesh and Afghanistan. Bangladesh faced Sri Lanka in the opening game of the tournament, where Bangladesh posted 261 in their 50 overs. Malinga made a good comeback with two wickets in the first over of the match. He finished with 4 for 23 runs. Tharanga started the chase very positive, where he hit 4 fours and 1 six. But with wickets in regular intervals, Sri Lanka scored only 124 runs and lost the match by 137 runs. This loss is recorded as the biggest loss by Sri Lanka in Asia Cup history and lowest total against Bangladesh in ODIs. This is also the biggest defeat for any of the three major Asian teams - India, Pakistan and Sri Lanka - in the Asia Cup. In the next game, Sri Lanka played rising Afghanistan. Sri Lanka shocked by a 91-run loss to Afghans largely due to poor fielding and batting. This is Sri Lanka's first defeat against Afghanistan. Afghans scored 249 runs after batting first. Thisara Perera took a five-wicket haul in the match. In reply, Tharanga top scored with 36 runs and others were fallen to the Afghan spinners.

2019 Cricket World Cup

The World cup was hosted by England and Wales in 2019. Sri Lanka was captained by Dimuth Karunaratne. Even though he captained Sri Lanka test team with two memorable wins against South Africa in South Africa, Karunaratne last played ODIs for Sri Lanka in 2015 World Cup. The first match was against New Zealand, where Sri Lanka bowled out for 136 runs in 29.2 overs. Karunaratne scored an unbeaten fifty, where eight players scored less than 10 runs. Karunaratne became the second cricketer to carry his bat in a World Cup match. New Zealand started World Cup campaign with a comfortable victory with 10 wickets win. Against rising Afghanistan in the second match, Sri Lanka again scored sub par total of 201 runs, where Kusal Perera top scored with 78 runs. Sri Lankan bowlers led by Malinga and Nuwan Pradeep secured the match for Sri Lanka by restricting Afghans for 152 runs. With career best 4 wickets for 31 runs, Pradeep won man of the match award.

The next two games against Pakistan and Bangladesh were washed out due to rain which earned Sri Lanka two points to move up in the table. Sri Lanka played against Australia in the next match, where Australia won by 87 runs. Australia batted first and scored 334 runs with the century by Aaron Finch. During the chase, Sri Lankan openers made a solid foundation with 115 runs in 15 overs. Kusal was dismissed for 52 and then Karunaratne dismissed for 97 runs. After the two wickets, Australia took the momentum back and restricted Sri Lanka for 247 runs.

With two big losses and two abandoned games, Sri Lanka was at the brink of eliminating from the World Cup. However, they continued to dominate against favorites and eventual World Cup champions and hosts England for the fourth consecutive time in World Cup history. Sri Lanka batted first and scored modest total of 232/9. Mathews top scored with unbeaten 85 runs. In the chase of England, Malinga struck on the second ball of the match to dismiss Jonny Bairstow and then James Vince for 14. Wickets at regular intervals slowed down the England chase, where Dhananjaya de Silva took two wickets in one over to favor the game towards Sri Lanka. English allrounder Ben Stokes continued to delayed Sri Lanka's victory, where he scored unbeaten 82 runs. Finally England lost the match by 20 runs. With 4 for 43, veteran Malinga won man of the match award. With this shocking win, the race for the final four was reopened and England was in trouble to move to the semi-finals. During the match, Malinga became the fourth bowler to take 50 wickets in World Cup history after fellow Sri Lanka Muralitharan, Pakistani pacer Wasim Akram and Aussie pacer Glenn McGrath. He also became the quickest to achieve the milestone with 26 innings in World Cups.

In the next match which was a must win game for Sri Lanka to continue their hopes to final four, Sri Lanka lost the match against South Africa by 9 wickets. No any Sri Lanka scored above 50 in the match. As a result of the match, Sri Lanka eliminated from the World Cup along with Bangladesh. The next match was against West Indies. Sri Lanka batted first and posted a total of 338/6. In the match, Avishka Fernando scored his maiden ODI century, becoming the youngest Sri Lankan to score a World Cup century. In reply, West Indies were under control for most of the innings, where young batsman Nicholas Pooran also scored his maiden ODI century. This was the first time in World Cup history that two men under the age of 25 scored hundreds in the same match. Then comes the craziest ball of the tournament, where Angelo Mathews bowled the 48th over of the chase, having not bowled a single ball previously in this World Cup or, in any ODI since December 2017. In his first ball, Pooran edged the ball and was dismissed. This turned the match again towards Sri Lanka. Finally, Sri Lanka won the match by 23 runs. In the final match of the tournament, Sri Lanka played against India. Sri Lanka scored 264 in fifty overs powered by the century of Angelo Mathews. This was his third ODI century, where all three came against India. India chased down the target in 43rd over and won the match by 7 wickets. Sri Lanka finished the tournament as sixth in the table with 3 wins, 4 losses and 2 abandoned matches.

== 2020s ==
2021 ICC T20 World Cup

Once the No. 1 T20 side in the world, Sri Lanka forced to play in a qualifying tournament in order to gain entry to the 2020 T20 World Cup due to lower rankings. Sri Lanka slipped to ninth on the T20 rankings after losing 12 of their 16 most-recent matches in 2018 thus did not gained automatic entry into the "Super 12" round. Instead, Sri Lanka will have to finish in the top two in a group of four in the opening round of the competition, in order to progress into the part of the tournament into which the eight top teams gain automatic entry.

Sri Lanka started their World Cup campaign with a comfortable win against Namibia with 7 wickets. Namibia batted first and only scored 96 runs, where Maheesh Theekshana ripped through the Namibian batting line-up. In the next match, Sri Lanka played against Ireland. Sri Lanka batted first where they lost three wickets for less than ten runs. But then the team managed to score 150-plus, first time that has occurred in T20Is courtesy of 123 run partnership between Pathum Nissanka and Wanindu Hasaranga, the highest for the fourth wicket in T20 World Cups. In the end, Ireland bowled out for 101 runs and Sri Lanka won by 70 runs and moved to the Super 12s round. Sri Lanka then played against Netherlands in their final Group 1 fixture. Netherlands were bowled out again very cheaply for 44 runs, the second-lowest in the men's T20 World Cup. It was also the lowest T20 total by any team in the UAE. Sri Lanka won the match by 8 wickets with 77 balls remaining. With this win, Sri Lanka assured the spot in Group A along with Australia, South Africa, England, West Indies and Bangladesh.

In Group A, Sri Lanka first played against Bangladesh, where Bangladesh scored a daunting 171 in the first innings. In the chase, Charith Asalanka produced the innings of the game, hitting 80 not out off 49 balls, whereas Bhanuka Rajapaksa struck 53 off 31, guided Sri Lanka to a 5 wicket win. The second match was against Australia, where Sri Lanka lost by 7 wickets. Then against South Africa, Sri Lanka edged closer to win the match, but David Miller stole 15 runs in the final over to win the match for South Africa. However, in the match, Hasaranga got a hat trick, becoming first Sri Lankan to take a hat trick in a T20 World Cup. Against England, Sri Lanka faced a must win situation to qualify for semi finals. Even though Hasaranga impressed with both bat and ball in the match, England finally won the match by 26 runs courtesy of Jos Butler's century. On 4 November 2021, Sri Lanka played the final match of the tournament, against defending champions West Indies. Sri Lanka batted first and scored a total of 189 runs with the help of Asalanka, and Nissanka fifties. West Indies only scored 169 runs where Sri Lanka finished the tournament with 20-run win. Meanwhile, Hasaranga ended the tournament as the highest wicket taker with 16 scalps, surpassing the previous record of 15 wickets by fellow Sri Lankan Ajantha Mendis. Later, both Asalanka and Hasaranga was included in the ICC T20 World Cup team of 2021.

2022 Asia Cup

The 15th edition of Asia Cup was held in the UAE for the fourth time and in T20I format. Five test playing nations with Hong Kong were participated to the tournament. In the first match against Afghanistan, Sri Lanka scored only 105 runs where Afghans chased the target within 10 overs. In the next match which was a must win situation, Bangladesh batted first and made a total of 183 in 20 overs. In the chase, Kusal Mendis made counter attack with a 37-ball 60 and Dasun Shanaka struck a 33-ball 45. Sri Lanka still needed 25 runs from 12 balls where Chamika Karunaratne, Asitha Fernando and Maheesh Theekshana made valuable contributions and eventually won by 2 wickets with 3 balls to spare. With this win, Sri Lanka end their six-match losing streak in Asia Cups, and their first win since beating UAE in 2016. In Super 4s, Sri Lanka met Afghanistan again where Afghans made a solid total of 175/6. In reply, Pathum Nissanka and Kusal Mendis made a solid platform at the top, before cameos from Danushka Gunathilaka, Bhanuka Rajapaksa and Wanindu Hasaranga sealed the win.

The next match was against the favorites, India. They batted first and made 173/8 due to Rohit Sharma's fifty. Meanwhile Virat Kohli was dismissed for naught of a brilliant inswing by pacer Dilshan Madushanka. Sri Lanka had a good opening stand where Kusal Mendis and Pathum Nissanka added 97 runs in 11.1 overs with both made fifties. In the end, Rajapaksa and Shanaka made winning combination and recorded third straight 170-plus chase. With this win, Sri Lanka qualified for the Asia Cup final. In the final Super 4 match, Sri Lanka made another victory over Pakistan by 5 wickets. Pakistan scored only 121 runs and the chase was mastered by 48-ball 55 from Pathum Nissanka. With this win, Sri Lanka became the only team to win all three games in this year's Asia cup. Sri Lanka met Pakistan again in the final, where Sri Lanka batted first and from 58 for 5, they later reached to 170 for 6. Rajapaksa made 71 in 45 balls and Hasaranga made cameo 21-ball 36 runs. In the chase, Madushan's two-in-two to remove Babar and Fakhar Zaman set the tone and eventually bowled out for 147. Sri Lanka won the match by 23 runs and became Asia cup champions for the 6th time. Later, Hasaranga won the player of the series award.

2022 ICC T20 World Cup

The eighth edition of the T20 world cup was in Australia, where Sri Lanka under the captaincy of Dasun Shanaka, again contested in the first round to get qualified for the main round. In the first round, Sri Lanka was in Group A along with Namibia, Netherlands and United Arab Emirates. In the first match against Namibia, Sri Lanka lost the match by massive 55 runs, which made a black patch in the glorious history of Lankan cricket. Namibia scored 163 in 20 overs and in reply Sri Lanka bowled out for 108 runs inside 19 overs. Shanaka's score of 29 was the highest score for Sri Lanka and Namibia's won is highlighted as the biggest upset in the history of their men's side. After a disastrous start at the world cup, Sri Lanka faced must win game against UAE at Geelong. Sri Lanka batted first and scored 152/8 with the help of Pathum Nissanka's 74. In chasing, UAE bundled out for 73 runs and Sri Lanka won the match by 79 runs. Against Netherlands, Sri Lanka scored 162 runs, where Kusal Mendis top scored with 79 runs. Even though Max O'Dowd scored unbeaten 71 runs in the chase, Netherlands lost the match by 16 runs and Sri Lanka qualified for the Super 12 stage.

In Super 12, Sri Lanka grouped in Group 1 with hosts Australia, England, New Zealand, Ireland and Afghanistan. Against Ireland, Sri Lanka won the match comfortably with net run rate soar to 2.467. Kusal Mendis made a match winning knock of 68 not out off 43 balls. In the second match, Sri Lanka faced the hosts Australia. With Nissanka's 40 runs and Asalanka's unbeaten 38 runs, Sri Lanka posted 157/6 in 20 overs. In reply, Australia took 13.4 overs to score 100 runs and finally needed 69 off 46 balls; until Marcus Stoinis made fastest 50 for Australia in men's T20Is off 17 balls, where Australia won by 7 wickets with 21 balls remaining. Sri Lanka next played New Zealand, where first three wickets of New Zealand fell for just 15 runs. However Glenn Phillips scored a century after two dropped chances, New Zealand finished 167 for 7 in 20 overs. In reply, Sri Lanka never get going, where they were bowled out for 102 runs inside 19.2 overs.

In the must-win match against Afghanistan, Dhananjaya de Silva made unbeaten 66 in the chase of 144 scored by Afghans. In bowling, Hasaranga, took 3 for 13 and Sri Lanka kept hopes alive for the semi final race if they win the final match against England. Against England, Sri Lanka batted first and scored 141 runs with Nissanka's 67. England started the chase very well where they scored 75 runs inside 7.2 overs. England kept losing wickets in regular intervals and they needed 13 runs from 12 balls. However, Ben Stokes guided his team to victory and semi final berth, where Sri Lanka exit the world cup as fourth in the group.

2023 Asia Cup

The sixteenth edition of Asia Cup was held in Pakistan and Sri Lanka with Pakistan as the official host. Sri Lanka was led by Shanaka and group with Bangladesh and Afghanistan in Group B. In the first match, Sri Lanka played against Bangladesh in Pallekele. Bangladesh scored 164 runs in 42.4 overs, where Matheesha Pathirana took4 wickets for just 32 runs. In the chase, Sadeera Samarawickrama scored 54 and Asalanka made unbeaten 62 runs. Sri Lanka won the match comfortably by 5 wickets. Against Afghanistan, Sri Lanka batted first in batting friendly wickets in Lahore, and scored 291 runs where Kusal Mendis scored 94 runs. Afghanistan made solid partnerships throughout the innings, where they passed 200 within 26 overs. Mohammad Nabi scored 65 runs and for qualification in the semi finals, Afghanistan needed 27 from 13 balls. At the end of 37th overs, Afghanistan needed three runs off one ball to win and qualify, where Dhananjaya de Silva took the ball. He took a wicket in the first ball and Afghanistan still needed to get to 295 in 37.4 overs. However, de Silva lbw Fazalhaq Farooqi in the fourth ball and Sri Lanka qualified for Super Fours with two-run win.

In Super Four, Sri Lanka first played against rivals Bangladesh. Sri Lanka batted first and scored 257/9 in 50 overs. Samarawickrama scored 93 runs and Mendis scored 50. Bangladesh made a steady start in the chase, and despite Towhid Hridoy's score of 82, Sri Lanka won the match by 21 runs. Next match was against India, where India were bowled out for 213 runs in 49.1 overs courtesy of fifer by Dunith Wellalage and four-fer by Asalanka. In reply, Sri Lanka were 5 for 73 and eventually lost all wickets for 172 runs. Wellalage made 42 not out and adjudged player of the match for his all-round performances. In the must-win game against Pakistan, Mohammad Rizwan made unbeaten 86 runs and Pakistan posted 252 runs. Sri Lanka were set a revised target of 252 runs due to rain, where Mendis steered the team to the victory with 91 runs. After wickets at regular intervals, Sri Lanka still needed 12 runs from 12 balls, and later became 8 runs from 6 balls with three wickets in hand. Sri Lanka needed 6 runs in 2 balls, where Asalanka scored 4 runs and then ran 2 in the last ball, guided Sri Lanka to the Asia Cup final for the 11th time in the history.

Sri Lanka met India in the final in a full-packed crowd in Colombo. Sri Lanka won the toss and elected to bat first. However, the decision went wrong quickly, as Sri Lanka bowled out for 50 runs in front of the home crowd, under swing bowling of Mohammed Siraj, who took 6 wickets for 21 runs. Five Sri Lanka batsmen made ducks and the total was recorded as the lowest all-out total in any major international final. This is also Sri Lanka's second-lowest ODI total. India won the Asia cup for a record seventh time.

2023 Cricket World Cup

The champions of 1996 Cricket World Cup, Sri Lanka lost the automatic qualification for the 13th edition of the Cricket World Cup, held in India. Sri Lanka had to compete in 2023 Cricket World Cup Qualifier took place in Zimbabwe along with nine other nations to qualify for the world cup. However, Sri Lanka won all the matches in the tournament and claimed the place at the 2023 Cricket World Cup along with the Netherlands. Sri Lanka won the qualifier tournament, beating the Netherlands by 128 runs in a one-sided final.

Shanka was announced as the captain for the world cup just prior to the tournament after several debates. However, he left the tournament after the Pakistan match due to injury and Kusal Mendis was named as the stand-in captain for the rest of the tournament. In the first match against South Africa, Sri Lanka suffered a heavy defeat, where Proteas scored a mammoth total of 428/5 courtesy of three centuries of de Kock, Markram and van der Dussen. In reply, Sri Lanka lost first two wickets for 67 runs. Kusal Mendis couterattacked the Proteas pace attack, where he scored 76 runs off 42 balls with 8 sixes in the process. Asalanka also scored rapid 79 and Shanaka with 68, but Sri Lanka lost the match by 102 runs. In the second match against Pakistan, Sri Lanka batted first and posted a total of 344 runs with the help of twin centuries by Mendis and Samarawickrama. In chasing, Pakistan lost two wickets for 37 runs until Abdullah Shafique and Mohammad Rizwan made 176-run partnership and chased Sri Lanka's total in 48.2 overs and recorded the highest successful chase at the World Cup, to give Sri Lanka's second defeat in the tournament. Pakistan continued their unbeaten streak against Sri Lanka at the men's ODI World Cup, winning all eight meetings, which is the most dominant head-to-head record at the world cup history as well.

In the third match, Sri Lanka lost to Australia cheaply by 6 wickets. Sri Lanka made a solid foundation where both openers: Kusal Perera and Pathum Nissanka - scored fifties and Sri Lanka raced to 125 in 21 overs. However, after the loss of openers, Sri Lanka lost the plot and bundled out for 209 runs, where they lost 10 wickets for just 84 runs. In bowling, Dilshan Madushanka got three early wickets, but Australia reached the target within 35.2 overs. Against the Netherlands, Sri Lanka won the match by 5 wickets after Samarawickrama made unbeaten match winning 91 runs.

In the next match, Sri Lanka met the defending champions, England. In the world cups, Sri Lanka had the upper hand, where they have won all previous meetings against England. England batted first and made a solid start of 40 runs without a wicket in the powerplay. But then England lost all ten wickets for 111 in 26 overs, courtesy of magnificent bowling by Lahiru Kumara, who took 3 for 35. Sri Lanka chased the target in 25.4 overs with 148 balls remaining to maintain their dominance over England in world cups. After the boost in the win, Sri Lanka then played Afghanistan. Sri Lanka made only 241 runs where Nissanka top scored with 46 runs. Afghanistan chased the target easily and Sri Lanka were virtually out of the running for a semi-final berth after this loss. Next match was against India, where Sri Lanka had the scar made in the Asia Cup final weeks earlier. In the match, India scored 357/8 in 50 overs leaving a daunting target for Lankans. Within 19.4 overs, Sri Lanka were bowled out for 55 runs, making the third score less than 100 against India in this year and India won by 302 runs. When eighth wicket is fallen, Sri Lanka only had 29 runs on the board, and were in serious danger of folding for the lowest total in ODI cricket.

Next match was against the rivals, Bangladesh. Sri Lanka made 273 in their 50 overs with Asalanka scored a century in the process. The special incidence was veteran Angelo Mathews was declared out by Time Out, the first instance in international cricket. The wicket made huge criticism among the cricket community, but Bangladesh and match officials stated it was all under the law. Bangladesh chased the target 41.1 overs and the rival rose again when Mathews dismissed Shakib Al Hasan and gestured timed out celebration. This was the first world cup match lost to Bangladesh as well. In the final match of the tournament, Sri Lanka played against New Zealand. Sri Lanka made another low score of 171, where Kusal Perera made a rapid 51 in 28 balls with 9 fours and 2 sixes. New Zealand comfortably won the match by 5 wickets. Sri Lanka finished the tournament in ninth position with only 2 wins. This also resulted the exit from qualification for the 2025 ICC Champions Trophy after very low net run rate. This world cup made several black marks in Sri Lankan ODI history, where they even lost to Afghanistan and Bangladesh cheaply.

2024 ICC T20 World Cup

The World Cup was co-hosted by the West Indies and the USA, where Sri Lanka led by Wanindu Hasaranga. Sri Lanka played the tournament in Group D along with South Africa, Bangladesh, Netherlands and Nepal. In the first match, Sri Lanka bundled out for just 77 runs against South African pace attack, the lowest they scored in T20Is. This is also the lowest total by any team against South Africa in men's T20Is. In the second match against Bangladesh, Sri Lanka scored 124 runs courtesy of Nissanka's 47 runs. Even though Bangladesh had some nervy places, they won the match by 2 wickets.

With the risk of knock out of the tournament early, Sri Lanka has to play the next match against rising Nepal, but abandoned without a ball bowled due to heavy rain. The result gave Sri Lanka the brink of early exit, but won the next match against the Netherlands by 83 runs. Sri Lanka batted first and scored 201, where Kusal Mendis and Asalanka both made 46 each. However the win was not enough to enter the next stage and Sri Lanka made another black mark in their recent Twenty20 World Cup history.

2025 Asia Cup

After ups and downs in T20I arena, Sri Lanka entered Asia Cup as defending T20I Asian champions under the captaincy of Charith Asalanka. They played in group B along with Afghanistan, Bangladesh and Hong Kong. In the first match, Sri Lanka made thumping win against rivals Bangladesh by 6 wickets where Nissanka made a fifty and newcomer Kamil Mishara made an unbeaten match winning 46 runs. In the second match against Hong Kong, Sri Lanka won the match by 4 wickets with the contribution by Nissanka's fifty at the top of the innings, and a Hasaranga cameo. However, Hong Kong made tough to win easily as they scored 149 for 4 where Nizakat Khan made 52 runs and later made breakthroughs with bowlers. However poor catching cost the defeat where Hong Kong's bowlers made too many mistakes at the death. In the game against Afghanistan, Sri Lanka won the match by 6 wickets and finished 100% record through the group stage. Afghanistan batted first and made 169 for 8, where Mohammad Nabi belted five sixes in the final over bowled by left-arm spinner Dunith Wellalage resulted Afghanistan struck 49 in the last two overs. In the meantime, Nuwan Thushara contributed with 4 for 18. In the chase, Nissanka got out early, but Kusal Mendis made unbeaten 74 runs and guided the team to victory.

In the Super 4s, Sri Lanka met Bangladesh again in Dubai. Sri Lanka lost the toss and batted first for the first time in the series. They scored 168 for 7 where Shanaka made unbeaten 64 off 37 balls to set the platform. However, in the chase, Bangladesh top order counter attacked Thushara and Chameera and finally won the match by 4 wickets. In a must win situation, Sri Lanka played Pakistan in the next match. Before the match, Pakistan have lost five matches on the trot against Sri Lanka. Sri Lanka batted first and only scored mere 133 for 8 where Kamindu Mendis scored his third T20I fifty. In the chase, Pakistan collapsed from 43 for 0 in five overs to 57 for 4 in the ninth over but then won the match in 18 overs. Without the contention for the final, Sri Lanka played the dead rubber against India in the last match. India batted first and made a total of 202 in their 20 overs. During the chase, Nissanka made the highest T20I individual score for Sri Lanka by making 109 runs and made a solid platform with Kusal Perera for 127 runs where Perera also scored 58 runs. However with regular falling of wickets, the match ended in a tie and India won the match by Super Over.

== See also ==
- Cricket in Sri Lanka
