= International cricket in 1926–27 =

International cricket season

The 1926–27 international cricket season was from September 1926 to April 1927. There were no Test matches held during this period.

== Season overview ==
International tours
| Start date | Home team | Away team | Results [Matches] | | | |
| Start date | Home team | Away team | Test | ODI | FC | LA |
|---|---|---|---|---|---|---|
| 16 December 1926 | India | Marylebone | — | — | 0–1 [2] | — |
| 28 January 1927 | Ceylon | Marylebone | — | — | 0–1 [4] | — |
| 19 February 1927 | Jamaica | England | — | — | 0–0 [3] | — |

== December ==
=== MCC in India ===
Unofficial Test series
| No. | Date | Home captain | Away captain | Venue | Result |
|---|---|---|---|---|---|
| Match 1 | 16–18 December | C. K. Nayudu | Arthur Gilligan | Bombay | Australia by 9 wickets |
| Match 2 | 31 Dec–3 January | AL Hosie | Arthur Gilligan | Calcutta | Match drawn |

== January ==
=== MCC in Ceylon ===
Unofficial Test series
| No. | Date | Home captain | Away captain | Venue | Result |
|---|---|---|---|---|---|
| Match 1 | 28–29 January | Not mentioned | Arthur Gilligan | Colombo Cricket Club Ground, Colombo | Match drawn |
| Match 2 | 30 Jan–1 February | Churchill Gunasekara | Arthur Gilligan | Colombo | Match drawn |
| Match 3 | 2–4 February | Not mentioned | Arthur Gilligan | Hatton | Match drawn |
| Match 4 | 5–7 February | Not mentioned | Arthur Gilligan | Colombo | Marylebone by an innings and 91 runs |

== February ==
=== England in Jamaica ===
First-class match
| No. | Date | Home captain | Away captain | Venue | Result |
|---|---|---|---|---|---|
| Match 1 | 19–22 February | Karl Nunes | Lionel Tennyson | Sabina Park, Kingston | Match drawn |
| Match 2 | 24–26 February | Karl Nunes | Lionel Tennyson | Melbourne Park, Kingston | Match drawn |
| Match 3 | 9–12 March | Karl Nunes | Lionel Tennyson | Sabina Park, Kingston | Match drawn |
