= Sir Julien Cahn's cricket team in Ceylon in 1936–37 =

International cricket tour

Sir Julien Cahn's cricket team toured Ceylon and Malaya in March and April 1937.

The team played nine games in all but the majority were against minor opposition. The team was unbeaten on tour, winning three times with six matches drawn. The only first-class match on the tour was against a Ceylon national XI at the Nomads Ground in Victoria Park, Colombo. Cahn's team won by 6 wickets. Cahn's side included South African Test players Bob Crisp and Denys Morkel and the New Zealander Stewie Dempster, plus other members of Cahn's UK-based teams such as Jack Walsh and Tom Reddick.
