= Kenyan cricket team in Sri Lanka in 2001–02 =

International cricket tour

	Sri Lanka A	Kenya
- Dates: 26 January – 25 February 2002
Captains	Upul Chandana	Maurice Odumbe

FC series
- Result: Sri Lanka A won the 3-match series 3–0
Most runs	Upul Chandana (279)	Steve Tikolo (314)
Most wickets	Upul Chandana (18)	Collins Obuya (11)

LA series
- Result: Kenya won the 3-match series 2–1
Most runs	Upul Chandana (180)	Ravindu Shah (154)
Most wickets	Pulasthi Gunaratne (6)	Tony Suji (5); Peter Ongondo (5); Steve Tikolo (5)

The Kenyan cricket team toured Sri Lanka from January and February 2002 to play three first-class and three List A matches against Sri Lanka A. Kenya additionally played a two-day tour match against the BCCSL Academy XI which resulted in a draw. The first-class series, dubbed unofficial Test matches, was won by Sri Lanka A 3–nil. The List A series was won by Kenya 2–1.

== Squads ==
FCs		LAs	
Sri Lanka A	Kenya	Sri Lanka A	Kenya
Upul Chandana (c); Ian Daniel; Tillakaratne Dilshan; Dinusha Fernando; Upekha Fernando; Pulasthi Gunaratne; Avishka Gunawardene; Rangana Herath; Prasanna Jayawardena (wk); Dulip Liyanage; Prabath Nissanka; Ruchira Perera; Muthumudalige Pushpakumara; Chamara Silva; Michael Vandort; Gayan Wijekoon; Kaushalya Weeraratne	Maurice Odumbe (c); Josephat Ababu; Joseph Angara; Hitesh Modi; Collins Obuya; David Obuya; Thomas Odoyo; Peter Ongondo; Lameck Onyango; Kennedy Otieno (wk); Brijal Patel; Ravindu Shah; Mohammad Sheikh; Martin Suji; Tony Suji; Steve Tikolo	Upul Chandana (c); Tillakaratne Dilshan; Upekha Fernando; Pulasthi Gunaratne; Avishka Gunawardene; Rangana Herath; Prasanna Jayawardena (wk); Dulip Liyanage; Anushka Polonowita; Muthumudalige Pushpakumara; Chamara Silva; Sajeewa Weerakoon; Kaushalya Weeraratne; Gayan Wijekoon	Maurice Odumbe (c); Josephat Ababu; Joseph Angara; Hitesh Modi; Collins Obuya; David Obuya (wk); Thomas Odoyo; Peter Ongondo; Lameck Onyango; Kennedy Otieno; Brijal Patel; Ravindu Shah; Mohammad Sheikh; Martin Suji; Tony Suji; Steve Tikolo

Dulip Liyanage was added to the Sri Lankan A squad on 5 February to cover the injured Dinusha Fernando. The following day Pulasthi Gunaratne was also added to squad. For the List A series, Ian Daniel, Michael Vandort, Prabath Nissanka and Ruchira Perera were replaced by Sajeewa Weerakoon and Anushka Polonowita in the Sri Lankan squad.

== Tour match ==
=== Two-day match: BCCSL Academy XI v Kenya ===
26–27 January 2002
Scorecard

BCCSL Academy XI	v	Kenya
281/9d (93.1 overs); Jehan Mubarak 100 (191); Thomas Odoyo 4/54 (14.1 overs)		234 (65.3 overs); Kennedy Otieno 70 (60); Kaushal Lokuarachchi 9/50 (24.3 overs)

Match drawn
Nondescripts Cricket Club Ground, Colombo
Umpires: Godfrey Pushparajah (SL) and T. M. Samarasinghe (SL)

- Kenya won the toss and elected to field.

The only warm-up match for the Kenyans was a two-day match against Board of Control for Cricket in Sri Lanka Academy XI, a development side. Kenya won the toss and sent their opponents into bat. Opening batsman Jehan Mubarak led the way posting 100 before retiring out. Mubarak combined with skipper Anushka Polonowita (52) to score a 126-run third-wicket partnership. The first day ended with Academy on 276/7. The following day, the hosts declared their innings closed on 281/9 with the Kenya's Thomas Odoyo taking 4/54. In reply, Kenya's openers of Kennedy Otieno and Ravindu Shah put together a century partnership before collapsing to be all out for 234 from 65.3 overs. Former Sri Lanka under-19 leg spinner Kaushal Lokuarachchi starred with the ball taking 9/50 from his 24.3 consecutive overs. He was deprived of the final wicket by his spin partner Amila Perera who ran out Martin Suji from short midwicket. Kenya's coach Sandeep Patil stated that it was good practice match on a very good pitch. He noted that his team is predominantly a one-day side and need to learn how to build long innings.

== First-class series ==
=== 1st match ===
31 January – 3 February 2002
Scorecard

Kenya	v	Sri Lanka A
292 (94.5 overs); Ravindu Shah 94 (136); Ruchira Perera 4/70 (20.5 overs)		414/9d (131 overs); Tillakaratne Dilshan 82 (167); Collins Obuya 3/87 (27 overs)
150 (65.2 overs); Steve Tikolo 65 (106); Muthumudalige Pushpakumara 4/34 (17 overs)		30/0 (4.3 overs); Avishka Gunawardene 14* (15)

Sri Lanka A won by 10 wickets
Paikiasothy Saravanamuttu Stadium, Colombo
Umpires: Ranmore Martinesz (SL) and Tyron Wijewardene (SL)

- Kenya won the toss and elected to bat.
- The final session's play on day 2 was lost due to rain.
- Michael Vandort (SL-A) scored his 2,000th first-class run.

=== 2nd match ===
7–10 February 2002 (Note: While four days of play were scheduled for each first-class match, the second match reached a result in three days.)
Scorecard

Sri Lanka A	v	Kenya
574/6d (132.4 overs); Upul Chandana 194 (193); Collins Obuya 3/123 (34.4 overs)		220 (79.1 overs); Ravindu Shah 106 (204); Upul Chandana 4/23 (16 overs)
		202 (f/o) (52.5 overs); Steve Tikolo 117 (144); Muthumudalige Pushpakumara 3/55 (13.5 overs)

Sri Lanka A won by an innings and 152 runs
Uyanwatte Stadium, Matara
Umpires: Lalith Jayasundara (SL) and Nandasena Pathirana (SL)

- Sri Lanka A won the toss and elected to bat.
- Upul Chandana (SL-A) scored his 4,000th first-class run.
- Ravindu Shah (Ken) scored his maiden first-class century.
- Steve Tikolo (Ken) scored his 1,000th first-class run.

=== 3rd match ===
14–17 February 2002
Scorecard

Sri Lanka A	v	Kenya
262 (71.5 overs); Avishka Gunawardene 70 (92); Collins Obuya 4/48 (19.5 overs)		220 (71 overs); Collins Obuya 49* (70); Upul Chandana 5/59 (26 overs)
361/8d (102 overs); Prasanna Jayawardene 75* (152); Joseph Angara 3/70 (25 overs)		204 (75.3 overs); Steve Tikolo 58 (131); Rangana Herath 5/52 (20.3 overs)

Sri Lanka A won by 199 runs
Rangiri Dambulla International Stadium, Dambulla
Umpires: Gamini Silva (SL) and Somasiri Dissanayake (SL)

- Sri Lanka A won the toss and elected to bat.

== List A series ==
=== 1st match ===
17 February 2002
Scorecard

Kenya; 247 (48.2 overs)	v	Sri Lanka A 212 (47 overs)
Steve Tikolo 107 (119); Pulasthi Gunaratne 4/48 (9 overs)		Dulip Liyanage 66* (96); Peter Ongondo 3/44 (10 overs)

Kenya won by 35 runs
Welagedara Stadium, Kurunegala
Umpires: Gamini Silva (SL) and Jagath Nandakumar (SL)

- Kenya won the toss and elected to bat.

=== 2nd match ===
23 February 2002
Scorecard

Kenya; 313/7 (50 overs)	v	Sri Lanka A 274 (42.5 overs)
Ravindu Shah 128 (135); Muthumudalige Pushpakumara 2/47 (9 overs)		Upul Chandana 108 (85); Steve Tikolo 3/57 (7.3 overs)

Kenya won by 39 runs
De Soysa Stadium, Colombo
Umpires: Gamini Dissanayake (SL) and Nandasena Pathirana (SL)

- Kenya won the toss and elected to bat.
- Upul Chandana (SL-A) scored his maiden List-A century.

=== 3rd match ===
25 February 2002
Scorecard

Sri Lanka A 260/7 (50 overs)	v	Kenya; 198 (48 overs)
Upul Chandana 64 (44); Martin Suji 2/41 (10 overs)		David Obuya 62 (82); Kaushalya Weeraratne 3/28 (6 overs)

Sri Lanka A won by 62 runs
Nondescripts Cricket Club Ground, Colombo
Umpires: Lalith Jayasundara (SL) and Tyron Wijewardene (SL)
Player of the match: Upul Chandana (SL-A)

- Sri Lanka A won the toss and elected to bat.
- Chamara Silva (SL-A) scored his 1,000th List A.
