= 2001 Sri Lanka Coca-Cola Cup =

Sri Lanka Coca-Cola Cup 2001
- Part of Indian cricket team in Sri Lanka in 2001
- Date: 18 July – 5 August 2001
- Location: Sri Lanka
- Result: Sri Lanka won the 2001 Sri Lanka Coca-Cola Cup
- Player of the series: Sanath Jayasuriya (Sri)
Teams
Sri Lanka	India	New Zealand
Captains
Sanath Jayasuriya	Saurav Ganguly	Stephen Fleming; Craig McMillan 4th, 6th ODIs
Most runs
Sanath Jayasuriya (305)	Rahul Dravid (259)	Nathan Astle (290)
Most wickets
Dilhara Fernando (11)	Harbhajan Singh (11)	Chris Harris (9)

The 2001 Sri Lanka Coca-Cola Cup was a One Day International (ODI) cricket tournament held in Sri Lanka in late June 2001. It was a tri-nation series between the national representative cricket teams of the Sri Lanka, India and New Zealand. Sri Lanka won the tournament by defeating India by 121 runs in the final.

== Squads ==
Sri Lanka	India	New Zealand
Sanath Jayasuriya (c); Marvan Atapattu; Romesh Kaluwitharana (wk); Russel Arnold; Mahela Jayawardene; Kumar Sangakkara (wk); Avishka Gunawardene; Chamara Silva; Chaminda Vaas; Dulip Liyanage; Suresh Perera; Nuwan Zoysa; Kumar Dharmasena; Muttiah Muralitharan; Dilhara Fernando	Sourav Ganguly (c); Rahul Dravid; Ashish Nehra; VVS Laxman; Hemang Badani; Sameer Dighe (wk); Debashish Mohanty; Zaheer Khan; Harbhajan Singh; Reetinder Singh Sodhi; Yuvraj Singh; Ajit Agarkar; Rahul Sanghvi; Virender Sehwag; Amay Khurasiya	Stephen Fleming (c); Adam Parore (wk); Nathan Astle; Grant Bradburn; James Franklin; Chris Harris; Craig McMillan; Kyle Mills; Dion Nash; Mathew Sinclair; Jacob Oram; Daryl Tuffey; Daniel Vettori; Lou Vincent

== Fixtures ==
=== 1st ODI ===
18 July 2001 (D/N)
Scorecard

Sri Lanka; 220 (48.5 overs)	v	New Zealand; 204/9 (50 overs)
Sanath Jayasuriya 88 (108); Chris Harris 2/42 (10 overs); Daniel Vettori 2/42 (10 overs)		Adam Parore 51* (83); Dilhara Fernando 2/28 (6 overs)

Sri Lanka won by 16 runs
R Premadasa Stadium, Colombo
Umpires: Lalith Jayasundara (SL) and Nandasena Pathirana (SL)
Player of the match: Sanath Jayasuriya (SL)

- Sri Lanka won the toss and elected to bat.
- Points: Sri Lanka 2, New Zealand 0.

=== 2nd ODI ===
20 July 2001 (D/N)
Scorecard

New Zealand; 211/8 (50 overs)	v	India; 127 (41.1 overs)
Nathan Astle 117 (150); Harbhajan Singh 2/25 (10 overs)		VVS Laxman 60 (103); Dion Nash 3/13 (6 overs)

New Zealand won by 84 runs
R Premadasa Stadium, Colombo
Umpires: Gamini Silva (SL) and Nandasena Pathirana (Zim)
Player of the match: Nathan Astle (NZ)

- New Zealand won the toss and elected to bat.
- Points: New Zealand 2, India 0.

=== 3rd ODI ===
22 July 2001 (D/N)
Scorecard

Sri Lanka; 221/9 (50 overs)	v	India; 215/7 (50 overs)
Avishka Gunawardene 63 (107); Harbhajan Singh 3/29 (10 overs)		Saurav Ganguly 69 (105); Suresh Perera 2/26 (6 overs)

Sri Lanka won by 6 runs
R Premadasa Stadium, Colombo
Umpires: Peter Manuel (SL) and Tyron Wijewardene (SL)
Player of the match: Suresh Perera (SL)

- Sri Lanka won the toss and elected to bat.
- Points: Sri Lanka 2, India 0.

=== 4th ODI ===
25 July 2001 (D/N)
Scorecard

Sri Lanka; 240/5 (48.3 overs)	v	New Zealand; 236/8 (50 overs)
Russel Arnold 91* (116); Kyle Mills 2/32 (8 overs)		Nathan Astle 54 (67); Kumar Dharmasena 3/52 (10 overs)

Sri Lanka won by 5 wickets
R Premadasa Stadium, Colombo
Umpires: Lalith Jayasundara (SL) and Asoka de Silva (SL)
Player of the match: Russel Arnold (SL)

- New Zealand won the toss and elected to bat.
- Points: Sri Lanka 2, New Zealand 0.

=== 5th ODI ===
26 July 2001
Scorecard

India; 133 (39.4 overs)	v	New Zealand; 200 (46.4 overs)
Virender Sehwag 33 (54); Chris Harris 2/9 (7 overs)		Dion Nash 42 (58); Saurav Ganguly 3/32 (9 overs)

New Zealand won by 67 runs
R Premadasa Stadium, Colombo
Umpires: Peter Manuel (SL) and Gamini Silva (Zim)
Player of the match: Dion Nash (NZ)

- India won the toss and elected to field.
- Points: New Zealand 2, India 0.

=== 6th ODI ===
28 July 2001 (D/N)
Scorecard

Sri Lanka; 183 (46.5 overs)	v	India; 184/3 (45.4 overs)
Sanath Jayasuriya 57 (72); Zaheer Khan 2/30 (8 overs)		VVS Laxman 87* (127); Chaminda Vaas 2/47 (10 overs)

India won by 7 wickets
R Premadasa Stadium, Colombo
Umpires: Asoka de Silva (SL) and Peter Manuel (SL)
Player of the match: VVS Laxman (Ind)

- Sri Lanka won the toss and elected to bat.
- Points: India 2, Sri Lanka 0.

=== 7th ODI ===
31 July 2001 (D/N)
Scorecard

Sri Lanka; 221/6 (36 overs)	v	New Zealand; 115/9 (36 overs)
Mahela Jayawardene 58 (46); Craig McMillan 2/17 (2 overs)		Dion Nash 23 (43); Chaminda Vaas 3/20 (7 overs)

Sri Lanka won by 106 runs
Sinhalese Sports Club Ground, Colombo
Umpires: Nandasena Pathirana (SL) and Tyron Wijewardene (SL)
Player of the match: Chaminda Vaas (SL)

- New Zealand won the toss and elected to field.
- Points: Sri Lanka 2, New Zealand 0.

=== 8th ODI ===
1 August 2001 (D/N)
Scorecard

Sri Lanka; 181 (45.5 overs)	v	India; 227/8 (50 overs)
Mahela Jayawardene 34 (78); Ashish Nehra 3/35 (8.5 overs)		Yuvraj Singh 98* (127); Dilhara Fernando 3/47 (9 overs)

India won by 46 runs
Sinhalese Sports Club Ground, Colombo
Umpires: Asoka de Silva (SL) and Gamini Silva (SL)
Player of the match: Yuvraj Singh (Ind)

- Sri Lanka won the toss and elected to field.
- Points: India 2, Sri Lanka 0.

=== 9th ODI ===
2 August 2001
Scorecard

New Zealand; 264/7 (50 overs)	v	India; 267/3 (45.4 overs)
Nathan Astle 108 (143); Ashish Nehra 3/30 (9 overs)		Virender Sehwag 100 (70); Craig McMillan 2/49 (8.4 overs)

India won by 7 wickets
R Premadasa Stadium, Colombo
Umpires: Lalith Jayasundara (SL) and Tyron Wijewardene (Zim)
Player of the match: Virender Sehwag (Ind)

- New Zealand won the toss and elected to bat.
- Points: New Zealand 0, India 2.
- Virender Sehwag (Ind) scored his first century in ODIs.

== Final ==
5 August 2001 (D/N)
Scorecard

Sri Lanka; 295/5 (50 overs)	v	India; 174 (47.2 overs)
Sanath Jayasuriya 99 (102); Harbhajan Singh 2/29 (10 overs)		VVS Laxman 37 (51); Dilhara Fernando 2/32 (10 overs)

Sri Lanka won by 121 runs
R Premadasa Stadium, Colombo
Umpires: Asoka de Silva (SL) and Tyron Wijewardene (SL)
Player of the match: Russel Arnold (SL)

- Sri Lanka won the toss and elected to bat.
- Sri Lanka won the Sri Lanka Coca-Cola Cup .
