= Indian cricket team in Sri Lanka in 2001 =

	Sri Lanka	India
- Dates: 18 July – 2 September 2001
Captains	Sanath Jayasuriya	Sourav Ganguly

Test series
- Result: Sri Lanka won the 3-match series 2–1
Most runs	Mahela Jayawardene (296)	Rahul Dravid (235)
Most wickets	Muttiah Muralitharan (23)	Venkatesh Prasad (11)
- Player of the series: Muttiah Muralitharan (SL)

The India cricket team toured Sri Lanka between 18 July and 2 September 2001. The two sides played a triangular ODI series also involving New Zealand, following which they played a three-match Test series. India's tour also included a one-day and a three-day fixture ahead of the ODI and Test series respectively.

Sri Lanka won the ODI series defeating India in the final. In the Test series that followed, they beat India by a 2–1 margin, winning the first and final Tests, while India won the second. It was Sri Lanka's second series win against India and first at home after three losses that followed the win against Australia in September 1999. Mahela Jayawardene made 296 runs and was the top-scorer for either sides, while Muttiah Muralitharan, who picked 23 wickets, was named the player of the series.

== Squads ==
Sri Lanka	India
Sanath Jayasuriya (c); Marvan Atapattu; Kumar Sangakkara (wk); Mahela Jayawardene; Hashan Tillakaratne; Russell Arnold; Romesh Kaluwitharana; Chaminda Vaas; Dilhara Fernando; Muttiah Muralitharan; Suresh Perera; Avishka Gunawardene; Michael Vandort; Thilan Samaraweera; Dulip Liyanage; Ruchira Perera	Sourav Ganguly (c); Rahul Dravid; Shiv Sunder Das; Sadagoppan Ramesh; Hemang Badani; Javagal Srinath; Harvinder Singh; Dinesh Mongia; Sameer Dighe (wk); Rahul Sanghvi; Mohammad Kaif; ~~Sachin Tendulkar~~; Sairaj Bahutule; Zaheer Khan; Venkatesh Prasad; Harbhajan Singh

Sachin Tendulkar pulled out of the tour after a scan of his injured right toe, from hairline fracture, revealed to not have healed. With that, he missed a Test for the first time since his debut in 1989 after playing 84 consecutive games.

== Tour match ==
8–10 August
Scorecard

Sri Lanka Board XI	v	Indians
326 (86.5 overs); Michael Vandort 116 (159); Javagal Srinath 3/68 (16 overs)		281/5d Sourav Ganguly 74* (112); Dinusha Fernando 2/68 (17 overs)

Match drawn
Paikiasothy Saravanamuttu Stadium, Colombo
Umpires: Lalith Jayasundara and Gamini Silva

- Sri Lanka Board XI won the toss and elected to bat.
- Sri Lanka Board XI played with 11 players and Indians with 15, both with 11 batting and 11 fielding.
- Indians declared their innings after one over on the morning of the last day after the pitch turned out to be a "dangerous" one for batting.

== Test Series ==
=== 1st Test ===
14–17 August
Scorecard

India	v	Sri Lanka
187 (95.3 overs); Sadagoppan Ramesh 42 (127); Dilhara Fernando 5/42 (25 overs)		362 (107.5 overs); Sanath Jayasuriya 111 (138); Javagal Srinath 5/114 (24.5 overs)
180 (74.5 overs); Rahul Dravid 61* (172); Muttiah Muralitharan 5/49 (26.5 overs)		6/0 (1.5 overs); Sanath Jayasuriya 6* (5); Javagal Srinath 0/0 (1 overs)

Sri Lanka won by 10 wickets
Galle International Stadium, Galle
Umpires: Steve Bucknor (WI) and Asoka de Silva (SL)
Player of the match: Sanath Jayasuriya (SL)

- Sri Lanka won the toss and elected to field.
- Sanath Jayasuriya (SL) completed 2,000 runs playing in Sri Lanka.
- Kumar Sangakkara (SL) scored his first century in Tests.

=== 2nd Test ===
22–25 August
Scorecard

Sri Lanka	v	India
274 (78.3 overs); Mahela Jayawardene 104; Zaheer Khan 3/62 (22 overs)		232 (64.1 overs); Sadagoppan Ramesh 47; Chaminda Vaas 4/65 (21 overs)
221 (66.3 overs); Muttiah Muralitharan 67; Venkatesh Prasad 5/72 (21 overs)		264/3 (78.4 overs); Sourav Ganguly 98; Muttiah Muralitharan 2/96 (25 overs)

India won by 7 wickets
Asgiriya Stadium, Kandy
Umpires: Steve Bucknor (WI) and Tyron Wijewardene (SL)
Player of the match: Sourav Ganguly (Ind)

- India won the toss and elected to field.
- Tyron Wijewardene made his debut as an umpire.
- Chaminda Vaas (SL) played his 50th Test.
- Hashan Tillakaratne (SL) passed 3,000 runs in Tests.

=== 3rd Test ===
29 August–2 September
Scorecard

India	v	Sri Lanka
234 (81.1 overs); Shiv Sunder Das 59 (111); Muttiah Muralitharan 8/87 (34.1 overs)		610/6d (171 overs); Mahela Jayawardene 139 (216); Venkatesh Prasad 3/101 (34 overs)
299 (124.5 overs); Shiv Sunder Das 68 (162); Muttiah Muralitharan 3/109 (46.5 overs)

Sri Lanka won by an innings and 77 runs
Sinhalese Sports Club Ground, Colombo
Umpires: Asoka de Silva (SL) and Dave Orchard (SA)
Player of the match: Muttiah Muralitharan (SL)

- India won the toss and elected to bat.
- Thilan Samaraweera (SL) made his Test debut.
- Muttiah Muralitharan (SL) returned the best bowling figures in an innings in Sri Lanka (8/87).
- Rahul Dravid (Ind) passed 4,000 runs in Tests.
- India's innings defeat was its first against Sri Lanka.
