= English cricket team in Sri Lanka in 2000–01 =

The England cricket team toured Sri Lanka in February and March 2001, playing three Test matches and three One Day Internationals. England won the Test series 2–1, while Sri Lanka took the ODI series 3–0.

== Test series ==
=== 1st Test ===
22–26 February 2001
Scorecard

| Sri Lanka | v | England |
| 470/5d (170 overs); Marvan Atapattu 201* (536); Darren Gough 1/95 (26 overs) | | 253 (132.3 overs); Marcus Trescothick 122 (348); Sanath Jayasuriya 4/50 (27 overs) |
| | | 189 (110.3 overs) (f/o); Marcus Trescothick 57 (169); Sanath Jayasuriya 4/44 (32 overs) |

Sri Lanka won by an innings and 28 runs
Galle International Stadium
Umpires: Arani Jayaprakash (Ind) and Peter Manuel (SL)
Player of the match: Marvan Atapattu (SL)

- Sri Lanka won the toss and elected to bat.

=== 2nd Test ===
7–11 March 2001
Scorecard

| Sri Lanka | v | England |
| 297 (86 overs); Mahela Jayawardene 101 (165); Andy Caddick 4/55 (20 overs) | | 387 (157 overs); Nasser Hussain 109 (255); Muttiah Muralitharan 4/127 (63 overs) |
| 250 (89.1 overs); Kumar Sangakkara 95 (184); Darren Gough 4/50 (22 overs) | | 161/7 (71.1 overs); Graham Thorpe 46 (58); Chaminda Vaas 4/39 (18 overs) |

England won by 3 wickets
Asgiriya Stadium, Kandy
Umpires: B. C. Cooray (SL) and Rudi Koertzen (SA)
Player of the match: Darren Gough (Eng)

- Sri Lanka won the toss and elected to bat.
- Graeme Hick (Eng) played his 65th and final Test match.

=== Controversy ===
Sri Lanka's B. C. Cooray alongside South Africa's Rudi Koertzen were appointed as standing umpires for the second Test match at Asgiriya Stadium, Kandy. He and Koertzen made fair share of errors during the Test match which eventually changed the outcome of the match with England winning the match by a margin of three wickets in a low scoring yet tricky run-chase. Both of them were even escorted safely from the stadium by the security officials due to the tense situation which arose during the course of the match as fans chanted and booed the umpires in the stands criticising their erroneous calls. The match consisted at least 13 clear umpiring mistakes with Cooray playing the majority of his part. The Sri Lankan local fans vent their frustrations in the stands protesting against his umpiring blunders by holding placards and banners mentioning and accusing Cooray of having sold the match to secure a visa to England. The phrases "B.C You Sold This Match. Have Got Your Resident Visa for England" were seen during the fourth day of the match.

Cooray took the centre-stage when England were batting in their first innings where he turned down the loud appeals on three occasions when England skipper Nasser Hussain was trapped lbw which was later proven costly as far as Sri Lanka were concerned as Hussain went onto complete a match winning century and in fact Hussain was the beneficiary of Cooray's umpiring. He also denied the caught and bowled dismissal claimed by Muttiah Muralitharan when Graeme Hick was batting. On the other hand, Atherton also survived a close lbw call thanks largely due to Cooray. He also made another ridiculous decision by ruling out Sanath Jayasuriya during Sri Lanka's second innings when replays clearly suggested that the ball bowled by Andy Caddick had actually bumped well before it was taken on bounce by slip fielder Graham Thorpe who actually had to dive in order to complete the catch. Jayasuriya who was a casualty of Cooray's brain fade umpiring showed dissent at the decision as he hurled his helmet across the boundary line. The continuous flaws in umpiring also increased tensions between the team players of Sri Lanka and England with Kumar Sangakkara at one point losing his cool and involved in a heated verbal exchange with England's Michael Atherton and eventually Sangakkara labelled England as "cheats".

However, it has been pointed out that just as many decisions went against England, including what is widely considered the worst LBW decision in cricket History when Stewart was given out LBW despite the ball pitching two feet outside of leg stump

He also received backlash for his refusal to admit the mistakes he committed during the match. During the post-match presentations, fans of Sri Lanka and England yelled for him to be named Man of the Match. Initial reports by local media revealed that he would be dropped for the third and final test of the series, thus forcing him to a retirement from umpiring. However, the reports were deemed rumours as he was recalled as TV umpire for the third and final test which was confirmed by K. T. Francis who then served as the director of umpiring with the Sri Lanka Cricket. Despite such assurance from Francis, the second Test at Asgiriya turned out to be his last international match as an umpire.

=== 3rd Test ===
15–17 March 2001
Scorecard

| Sri Lanka | v | England |
| 241 (101.1 overs); Mahela Jayawardene 71 (152); Robert Croft 4/56 (32 overs) | | 249 (109.5 overs); Graham Thorpe 113* (267); Chaminda Vaas 6/73 (27.5 overs) |
| 81 (28.1 overs); Sanath Jayasuriya 23 (16); Ashley Giles 4/11 (9.1 overs) | | 74/6 (24.3 overs); Graham Thorpe 32* (49); Sanath Jayasuriya 4/24 (8.3 overs) |

England won by 4 wickets
Sinhalese Sports Club Ground, Colombo
Umpires: Asoka de Silva (SL) and Dave Orchard (SA)
Player of the match: Graham Thorpe (Eng)

- Sri Lanka won the toss and elected to bat.
- Dinuka Hettiarachchi (SL) played his only Test match.

== ODI series ==
=== 1st ODI ===
23 March 2001
Scorecard

| England; 143 (48.5 overs) | v | Sri Lanka; 144/5 (40.5 overs) |
| Graham Thorpe 62* (107); Muttiah Muralitharan 4/29 (9.5 overs) | | Marvan Atapattu 40 (89); Andy Caddick 2/42 (8 overs) |

Sri Lanka won by 5 wickets
Rangiri Dambulla International Stadium, Dambulla
Umpires: Asoka de Silva (SL) and Lalith Jayasundara (SL)
Player of the match: Muttiah Muralitharan (SL)

- England won the toss and elected to bat.
- This was the first ODI played at Dambulla. Michael Vaughan (Eng) made his ODI debut.

=== 2nd ODI ===
25 March 2001
Scorecard

| Sri Lanka; 226/6 (50 overs) | v | England; 160 (45 overs) |
| Mahela Jayawardene 101* (115); Alan Mullally 2/37 (10 overs) | | Alec Stewart 55 (102); Muttiah Muralitharan 3/11 (9 overs) |

Sri Lanka won by 66 runs
R. Premadasa Stadium, Colombo
Umpires: B. C. Cooray (SL) and Nandasena Pathirana (SL)
Player of the match: Mahela Jayawardene (SL)

- Sri Lanka won the toss and elected to bat.

=== 3rd ODI ===
27 March 2001
Scorecard

| England; 165/9 (50 overs) | v | Sri Lanka; 166/0 (33.5 overs) |
| Graeme Hick 46 (114); Chaminda Vaas 3/13 (8 overs) | | Romesh Kaluwitharana 102* (117) |

Sri Lanka won by 10 wickets
Sinhalese Sports Club Ground, Colombo
Umpires: Gamini Silva (SL) and Tyron Wijewardene (SL)
Player of the match: Romesh Kaluwitharana (SL)

- Sri Lanka won the toss and elected to field.
