= 2001 LG Abans Triangular Series =

LG Abans Triangular Series 2001-02
- Date: 8 December – 19 December 2001
- Location: Sri Lanka
- Result: Sri Lanka won the 2001 LG Abans Triangular Series
- Player of the series: Sanath Jayasuriya (SL)
Teams
Sri Lanka	West Indies	Zimbabwe
Captains
Sanath Jayasuriya	Carl Hooper	Stuart Carlisle
Most runs
Mahela Jayawardene (267)	Daren Ganga (223)	Stuart Carlisle (103)
Most wickets
Muttiah Muralitharan (10)	Corey Collymore (9)	Heath Streak (7)

The 2001 LG Abans Triangular Series was a One Day International (ODI) cricket tournament held in Sri Lanka in December 2001. It was a tri-nation series between the national representative cricket teams of the Sri Lanka, West Indies and Zimbabwe. The hosts Sri Lanka won the tournament by defeating the West Indies by 34 runs in the final by D/L method.

== Squads ==
Sri Lanka	West Indies	Zimbabwe
Sanath Jayasuriya (c); Russel Arnold; Marvan Atapattu; Charitha Buddhika; Kumar Dharmasena; Avishka Gunawardene; Mahela Jayawardene; Muttiah Muralitharan; Suresh Perera; Kumar Sangakkara; Chaminda Vaas; Nuwan Zoysa	Carl Hooper (c); Marlon Black; Darrel Brown; Corey Collymore; Pedro Collins; Daren Ganga; Chris Gayle; Ridley Jacobs; Brian Lara; Jermaine Lawson; Neil McGarrell; Marlon Samuels; Ramnaresh Sarwan	Stuart Carlisle (c); Gary Brent; Dion Ebrahim; Grant Flower; Andy Flower; Travis Friend; Douglas Marillier; Mluleki Nkala; Henry Olonga; Heath Streak; Tatenda Taibu; Craig Wishart

== Matches ==
=== 1st match ===
8 December
Scorecard

Zimbabwe; 38 (15.4 overs)	v	Sri Lanka; 40/1 (4.2 overs)
Stuart Carlisle 16 (35); Chaminda Vaas 8/19 (8 overs)		Marvan Atapattu 23* (16); Heath Streak 1/26 (2.2 overs)

Sri Lanka won by 9 wickets
Sinhalese Sports Club Ground, Colombo
Umpires: Nandasena Pathirana (SL) and Gamini Silva (SL)
Player of the match: Chaminda Vaas (SL)

- Sri Lanka won the toss and elected to field.
- Chaminda Vaas became the first Sri Lanka player to take a hat-trick. His figures of 8/19 recorded as the best bowling figures in ODIs and the format's first 8-wicket haul.
- Zimbabwe recorded the lowest total in ODIs.
- Points: Sri Lanka 5, Zimbabwe 0.

=== 2nd match ===
9 December
Scorecard

West Indies; 173 (49.1 overs)	v	Zimbabwe; 175/6 (48.1 overs)
Daren Ganga 59 (89); Travis Friend 2/26 (8.1 overs)		Andy Flower 47* (77); Corey Collymore 2/29 (10 overs)

Zimbabwe won by 4 wickets
Sinhalese Sports Club Ground, Colombo
Umpires: Asoka de Silva (SL) and Tyron Wijewardene (SL)
Player of the match: Stuart Carlisle (Zim)

- Zimbabwe won the toss and elected to field.
- Points: Zimbabwe 5, West Indies 0.

=== 3rd match ===
11 December
Scorecard

West Indies; 250/8 (50 overs)	v	Sri Lanka; 201 (43.2 overs)
Brian Lara 60 (53); Kumar Dharmasena 3/50 (10 overs)		Sanath Jayasuriya 83 (86); Corey Collymore 5/51 (9.2 overs)

West Indies won by 49 runs
R Premadasa Stadium, Colombo
Umpires: Asoka de Silva (SL) and Peter Manuel (SL)
Player of the match: Corey Collymore (Win)

- West Indies won the toss and elected to bat.
- Jermaine Lawson (WIN) made his ODI debut.
- Points: West Indies 5, Sri Lanka 0.

=== 4th match ===
12 December
Scorecard

Sri Lanka; 272/7 (50 overs)	v	Zimbabwe; 213 (47.2 overs)
Mahela Jayawardene 96 (108); Heath Streak 3/51 (10 overs)		Grant Flower 45 (63); Muttiah Muralitharan 4/32 (10 overs)

Sri Lanka won by 59 runs
R Premadasa Stadium, Colombo
Umpires: Lalith Jayasundara (SL) and Tyron Wijewardene (SL)
Player of the match: Mahela Jayawardene (SL)

- Sri Lanka won the toss and elected to bat.
- Points: Sri Lanka 5, Zimbabwe 0.

=== 5th match ===
15 December
Scorecard

West Indies; 235 (49.5 overs)	v	Sri Lanka; 239/2 (43.1 overs)
Daren Ganga 52 (84); Charitha Buddhika 2/25 (7 overs)		Mahela Jayawardene 106* (94); Jermaine Lawson 2/47 (10 overs)

Sri Lanka won by 8 wickets
Asgiriya Stadium, Kandy
Umpires: Lalith Jayasundara (SL) and Gamini Silva (SL)
Player of the match: Mahela Jayawardene (SL)

- Sri Lanka won the toss and elected to field.
- Points: Sri Lanka 5, West Indies 0.

=== 6th match ===
16 December
Scorecard

Zimbabwe; 154 (49.2 overs)	v	West Indies; 155/2 (34 overs)
Heath Streak 57 (88); Darrel Brown 3/21 (10 overs)		Chris Gayle 85 (79); Heath Streak 1/16 (6 overs)

West Indies won by 8 wickets
Asgiriya Stadium, Kandy
Umpires: Peter Manuel (SL) and Nandasena Pathirana (SL)
Player of the match: Chris Gayle (Win)

- West Indies won the toss and elected to field.
- Darrel Brown and Ryan Hinds (both WIN) made their ODI debuts
- Points: West Indies 5, Zimbabwe 0.

=== Final ===
19 December
Scorecard

Sri Lanka; 253/8 (50 overs)	v	West Indies; 212 (45.4 overs)
Sanath Jayasuriya 64 (85); Carl Hooper 2/32 (10 overs)		Chris Gayle 60 (87); Kumar Dharmasena 3/44 (10 overs)

Sri Lanka won by 34 runs (D/L)
R Premadasa Stadium, Colombo
Umpires: Richard Kettleborough (Eng) and Joel Wilson (WI)
Player of the match: Sanath Jayasuriya (SL)

- Sri Lanka won the toss and elected to bat.
- Sri Lanka won the 2001-02 LG Abans Triangular Series.
