= South African cricket team in Sri Lanka in 2004 =

	Sri Lanka	South Africa
- Dates: 4 – 31 August 2004
Captains	Marvan Atapattu	Graeme Smith

Test series
- Result: Sri Lanka won the 2-match series 1–0
Most runs	Kumar Sangakkara (367)	Graeme Smith (179)
Most wickets	Chaminda Vaas (9)	Shaun Pollock (10); Nicky Boje (10)
- Player of the series: Chaminda Vaas (SL)

One Day International series
- Results: Sri Lanka won the 5-match series 5–0
Most runs	Kumar Sangakkara (247)	Jacques Kallis (237)
Most wickets	Upul Chandana (8); Tillakaratne Dilshan (8)	Shaun Pollock (5)
- Player of the series: Kumar Sangakkara (SL)

The South Africa national cricket team toured Sri Lanka during the 2004 season, playing two Tests from 4 to 15 August 2004. South Africa was led by Graeme Smith while Sri Lanka was led by Marvan Atapattu. Sri Lanka won the Test series 1–0 with one match drawn.

== Squads ==
Tests		ODIs	
Sri Lanka	South Africa	Sri Lanka	South Africa
Marvan Atapattu (c); Sanath Jayasuriya; Mahela Jayawardene; Romesh Kaluwitharana (wk); Thilan Samaraweera; Tillakaratne Dilshan; Kumar Sangakkara; Upul Chandana; Chaminda Vaas; Farveez Maharoof; Muthiah Muralidaran; Rangana Herath; Lasith Malinga	Graeme Smith (c); Herschelle Gibbs; Martin van Jaarsveld; Jacques Rudolph; Mark Boucher (wk); Jacques Kallis; Shaun Pollock; Lance Klusener; Nicky Boje; Makhaya Ntini; Nantie Hayward; Boeta Dippenaar; Herschelle Gibbs	Marvan Atapattu (c); Avishka Gunawardene; Sanath Jayasuriya; Kumar Sangakkara (wk); Mahela Jayawardene; Tillakaratne Dilshan; Upul Chandana; Chaminda Vaas; Kaushal Lokuarachchi; Farveez Maharoof; Nuwan Zoysa; Rangana Herath; Saman Jayantha; Lasith Malinga; Dilhara Fernando	Graeme Smith (c); Jacques Rudolph; Mark Boucher (wk); Jacques Kallis; Shaun Pollock; Lance Klusener; Nicky Boje; Makhaya Ntini; Jean-Paul Duminy; Alan Dawson; Herschelle Gibbs; Robin Peterson; Charl Langeveldt

== Test series summary ==
=== 1st Test ===
4–8 August 2004
Scorecard

Sri Lanka	v	South Africa
486 (145.4 overs); DPMD Jayawardene 237 (415); SM Pollock 4/48 (23 overs)		376 (139.4 overs); JA Rudolph 102 (297); M Muralitharan 4/130 (46.4 overs)
214/9dec (67 overs); ST Jayasuriya 74 (139); N Boje 5/88 (22 overs)		203/3 (90 overs); GC Smith 74 (209); TM Dilshan 1/30 (16 overs)

Match drawn
Galle International Stadium, Galle
Umpires: DJ Harper (AUS) and DR Shepherd (ENG)
Player of the match: DPMD Jayawardene (SL)

- Sri Lanka won the toss and elected to bat.

=== 2nd Test ===
11–15 August 2004
Scorecard

Sri Lanka	v	South Africa
470 (142.3 overs); KC Sangakkara 232 (357); SM Pollock 4/81 (30 overs)		189 (69.1 overs); GC Smith 65 (125); ST Jayasuriya 5/34 (14.1 overs)
211/4dec (55 overs); MS Atapattu 72 (151); JH Kallis 2/6 (6 overs)		179 (67 overs); HH Dippenaar 59* (166); WPUJC Vaas 6/29 (18 overs)

Sri Lanka won by 313 runs
Singhalese Sports Club Cricket Ground, Colombo
Umpires: BF Bowden (NZ) and SA Bucknor (WI)
Player of the match: KC Sangakkara (SL)

- Sri Lanka won the toss and elected to bat.

== One Day Internationals (ODIs) ==
=== 1st ODI ===
20 August 2004 (D/N)
Scorecard

South Africa; 263/9 (50 overs)	v	Sri Lanka; 265/7 (49 overs)
JH Kallis 74 (85); WPUJC Vaas 4/33 (7 overs)		MS Atapattu 64 (82); M Ntini 2/46 (9 overs)

Sri Lanka won by 3 wickets
R. Premadasa Stadium, Colombo
Umpires: BF Bowden (NZ) and MG Silva (SL)
Player of the match: WPUJC Vaas (SL)

- South Africa won the toss and elected to bat.
- JP Duminy (SA) made his ODI debut.

=== 2nd ODI ===
22 August 2004
Scorecard

Sri Lanka; 213/9 (50 overs)	v	South Africa; 176 (48.5 overs)
KC Sangakkara 63 (83); JH Kallis 3/20 (6 overs)		SM Pollock 54 (78); DNT Zoysa 5/26 (8 overs)

Sri Lanka won by 37 runs
R. Premadasa Stadium, Colombo
Umpires: BF Bowden (NZ) and MG Silva (SL)
Player of the match: DNT Zoysa (SL)

- Sri Lanka won the toss and elected to bat.

=== 3rd ODI ===
25 August 2004 (D/N)
Scorecard

South Africa; 191 (50 overs)	v	Sri Lanka; 192/6 (47.4 overs)
JH Kallis 52 (108); TM Dilshan 3/25 (7 overs)		MS Atapattu 97* (140); L Klusener 2/36 (9 overs)

Sri Lanka won by 4 wickets
Rangiri Dambulla International Stadium, Dambulla
Umpires: BF Bowden (NZ) and TH Wijewardene (SL)
Player of the match: MS Atapattu (SL)

- South Africa won the toss and elected to bat.

=== 4th ODI ===
28 August 2004
Scorecard

South Africa; 235/7 (50 overs)	v	Sri Lanka; 236/3 (46.1 overs)
SM Pollock 52* (69); KS Lokuarachchi 2/39 (10 overs)		KC Sangakkara 74* (86); RJ Peterson 1/22 (3 overs)

Sri Lanka won by 7 wickets
Rangiri Dambulla International Stadium, Dambulla
Umpires: BF Bowden (NZ) and EAR de Silva (SL)
Player of the match: KC Sangakkara (SL)

- Sri Lanka won the toss and elected to field.

=== 5th ODI ===
31 August 2004
Scorecard

Sri Lanka; 308/8 (50 overs)	v	South Africa; 259 (48.1 overs)
ST Jayasuriya 79 (85); CK Langeveldt 3/31 (7 overs)		JH Kallis 101 (127); UDU Chandana 5/61 (9.1 overs)

Sri Lanka won by 49 runs
Singhalese Sports Club Cricket Ground, Colombo
Umpires: BF Bowden (NZ) and TH Wijewardene (SL)
Player of the match: UDU Chandana (SL)

- South Africa won the toss and elected to field.
