= 2000 Singer Triangular Series =

Sporting event

The 2000 Singer Triangular Series was an ODI cricket tournament held in Sri Lanka from 5 to 14 July 2000. It featured the national cricket teams of South Africa, Pakistan and the hosts, Sri Lanka. The competition was won by Sri Lanka, which defeated South Africa in the final.

== Squads ==
Sri Lanka	South Africa	Pakistan
Sanath Jayasuriya (c); Avishka Gunawardene; Marvan Atapattu; Upul Chandana; Mahela Jayawardene; Kumar Sangakkara (wk); Sanath Jayasuriya; Russel Arnold; Kumar Dharmasena; Muttiah Muralitharan; Chaminda Vaas; Nuwan Zoysa; Chaminda Vaas; Eric Upashantha; Pramodya Wickramasinghe	Shaun Pollock (c); Gary Kirsten; Andrew Hall; Jacques Kallis; Daryll Cullinan; Jonty Rhodes; Lance Klusener; Mark Boucher (wk); Nicky Boje; Nantie Hayward; Makhaya Ntini; Paul Adams; David Terbrugge; Neil McKenzie	Moin Khan (c) (wk); Saeed Anwar; Imran Nazir; Younis Khan; Inzamam-ul-Haq; Mohammad Yousuf; Abdul Razzaq; Azhar Mahmood; Shoaib Malik; Shabbir Ahmed; Arshad Khan; Mushtaq Ahmed; Waqar Younis; Mohammad Akram

== Points table ==
The tournament was organised in a round robin format, with each team playing each other twice.

Team	P	W	L	T	NR	NRR	Points
Sri Lanka	4	4	0	0	0		8
South Africa	4	2	2	0	0		4
Pakistan	4	0	4	0	0		0

== Matches ==
5 July
Scorecard

Pakistan; 164/8 (45 overs)	v	Sri Lanka; 166/5 (37.3 overs)
Inzamam-ul-Haq 83* (118); Nuwan Zoysa 4/34 (9 overs)		Marvan Atapattu 62 (92); Waqar Younis 2/11 (5 overs)

Sri Lanka won by 5 wickets
Galle International Stadium, Galle
Umpires: Gamini Silva (SL) and Peter Manuel (SL)
Player of the match: Nuwan Zoysa (Sri Lanka)

- Sri Lanka won the toss and elected to field.
- Kumar Sangakkara (Sri Lanka) made his ODI debut.
  Points - Sri Lanka 2; Pakistan 0

6 July
Scorecard

Sri Lanka; 249/7 (50 overs)	v	South Africa; 212 (48.2 overs)
Kumar Sangakkara 85 (116); Jacques Kallis 3/42 (10 overs)		Andrew Hall 81 (114); Upul Chandana 4/44 (10 overs)

Sri Lanka won by 37 runs
Galle International Stadium, Galle
Umpires: Gamini Silva (SL) and Lalith Jayasundara (SL)
Player of the match: Kumar Sangakkara (Sri Lanka)

- South Africa won the toss and elected to field.
- Points - Sri Lanka 2; Pakistan 0

8 July
Scorecard

South Africa; 241/6 (50 overs)	v	Pakistan; 223/9 (48.2 overs)
Jacques Kallis 83 (111); Abdul Razzaq 3/36 (10 overs)		Imran Nazir 80 (86); Nicky Boje 4/25 (10 overs)

South Africa won by 18 runs
R. Premadasa Stadium, Colombo
Umpires: Asoka de Silva (SL) and Peter Manuel (SL)
Player of the match: Jacques Kallis (South Africa)

- South Africa won the toss and elected to bat.
- Points - South Africa 2; Pakistan 0

9 July
Scorecard

Pakistan; 240/6 (50 overs)	v	Sri Lanka; 244/4 (49.2 overs)
Younis Khan 59 (102); Sanath Jayasuriya 2/33 (6 overs)		Sanath Jayasuriya 54 (81); Abdul Razzaq 2/50 (10 overs)

Sri Lanka won by 6 wickets
R. Premadasa Stadium, Colombo
Umpires: B. C. Cooray (SL) and Tyron Wijewardene (SL)
Player of the match: Sanath Jayasuriya (Sri Lanka)

- Pakistan won the toss and elected to bat.
- Points - Sri Lanka 2; Pakistan 0

11 July
Scorecard

South Africa; 167 (49.2 overs)	v	Sri Lanka; 168/2 (27.3 overs)
Jacques Kallis 83* (148); Upul Chandana 2/20 (10 overs)		Avishka Gunawardene 87 (75); Shaun Pollock 1/22 (6 overs)

Sri Lanka won by 8 wickets
Sinhalese Sports Club Ground, Colombo
Umpires: B. C. Cooray (SL) and Asoka de Silva (SL)
Player of the match: Avishka Gunawardene (Sri Lanka)

- Sri Lanka won the toss and elected to field.
- Points - Sri Lanka 2; South Africa 0

12 July
Scorecard

Pakistan; 153 (44.1 overs)	v	South Africa; 156/3 (37.3 overs)
Azhar Mahmood 36 (70); David Terbrugge 4/20 (8 overs)		Gary Kirsten 46 (62); Azhar Mahmood 1/26 (5 overs)

South Africa won by 7 wickets
Sinhalese Sports Club Ground, Colombo
Umpires: Gamini Silva (SL) and Asoka de Silva (SL)
Player of the match: David Terbrugge (South Africa)

- Pakistan won the toss and elected to bat.
- Points - South Africa 2; Pakistan 0

=== Final ===
14 July
Scorecard

Sri Lanka; 294/7 (50 overs)	v	South Africa; 264/9 (50 overs)
Sanath Jayasuriya 68 (86); Shaun Pollock 2/54 (9 overs)		Gary Kirsten 76 (94); Muttiah Muralitharan 5/44 (10 overs)

Sri Lanka won by 30 runs
R. Premadasa Stadium, Colombo
Umpires: B. C. Cooray (SL) and Peter Manuel (SL)
Player of the match: Muttiah Muralitharan (Sri Lanka)

- Sri Lanka won the toss and elected to bat.
