= Indian cricket team in Sri Lanka in 2006 =

| | Sri Lanka | India |
- Dates: 18 – 22 August 2006
| Captains | Mahela Jayawardene | Rahul Dravid |

One Day International series
- Results: 3-match series drawn 0–0
| Most runs | | Rahul Dravid (9) |

The Indian national cricket team visited Sri Lanka in August 2006 to play limited overs matches against the Sri Lankan national cricket team. Only one was played, but with no result, and then the tour was cancelled. The Indian team was captained by Rahul Dravid and Sri Lanka by Mahela Jayawardene.

== Squads ==
| Sri Lanka | India |
|---|---|
| Mahela Jayawardene (c); Kumar Sangakkara (vc & wk); Upul Tharanga; Sanath Jayasuriya; Tillakaratne Dilshan; Marvan Atapattu; Chamara Kapugedera; Chaminda Vaas; Farveez Maharoof; Lasith Malinga; Dilhara Fernando; Muttiah Muralitharan; Malinga Bandara; Ruchira Perera; Prasanna Jayawardene (wk) | Rahul Dravid (c); Virender Sehwag (vc); Sachin Tendulkar; Yuvraj Singh; Mohammad Kaif; Suresh Raina; MS Dhoni (wk); Irfan Pathan; Sreesanth; Harbhajan Singh; Ramesh Powar; Ajit Agarkar; Munaf Patel; RP Singh; Dinesh Mongia |

== Tour Matches ==
=== 50 Overs Match ===
12 August
Scorecard

| Sri Lanka A 202/9 (50 overs) | v | Indians; 203/7 (44.3 overs) |
| Upul Tharanga 88 (124); Virender Sehwag 3/16 (7 overs) | | Yuvraj Singh 61 (57); Nuwan Zoysa 2/37 (9 overs) |

Indians won by 3 wickets
Colts Cricket Club Ground, Colombo
Umpires: Gamini Dissanayake (SL) and Dilshan de Silva (SL)

- Indians won the toss and elected to field.

== ODI series ==
=== 1st ODI ===
18–19 August 2006
Scorecard

| India; 11/0 (3.4 overs) | v | Sri Lanka |
| Rahul Dravid 9* (19); Chaminda Vaas 0/4 (2 overs) |

Match abandoned
Sinhalese Sports Club Ground, Colombo
Umpires: Asoka de Silva (SL) and Billy Bowden (NZ)

- India won the toss and elected to bat first
- Reserve day was used for the match after rain and bad light interrupted Indian innings on first day, but it was eventually called off due to heavy rains on the reserve day.

=== 2nd ODI ===
20 August 2006
Scorecard

| Sri Lanka | v | India |

Match abandoned
Sinhalese Sports Club Ground, Colombo
Umpires: Billy Bowden (NZ) and Tyron Wijewardene (SL)

- No play was possible due to wet outfield and constant rain

=== 3rd ODI ===
22 August 2006
Scorecard

| Sri Lanka | v | India |

Match abandoned
Sinhalese Sports Club Ground, Colombo
Umpires: Asoka de Silva (SL) & Billy Bowden (NZ)

- Match called off due to constant rain
