= Zimbabwean cricket team in Sri Lanka in 2001–02 =

	Sri Lanka	Zimbabwe
- Dates: 21 December 2001 – 15 January 2002

Test series
- Result: Sri Lanka won the 3-match series 3–0
Most runs	Sanath Jayasuriya (295)	Trevor Gripper (167)
Most wickets	Muttiah Muralitharan (30)	Heath Streak (7)
- Player of the series: Muttiah Muralitharan (SL)

The Zimbabwean cricket team toured Sri Lanka from 21 December 2001 to 15 January 2002. The tour consisted of three Tests. Sri Lanka won the Test series 3–0.

== Squads ==
Sri Lanka	Zimbabwe

== Tour match ==
=== Three day:Tour Match:Sri Lanka Board XI v Zimbabweans ===
21 – 23 December
Scorecard

Zimbabwean	v	Sri Lanka Board XI
319/6d (90 overs); Trevor Gripper 101 (166); Dinusha Fernando 3/47 (15 overs)		269/4d (93 overs); Gayan Wijekoon 103 (212); Henry Olonga 2/52 (20 overs)
169/5d (51 overs); Gavin Rennie 68 (137); Ravindra Pushpakumara 2/38 (12 overs)		223/5 (41.2 overs); Chamara Silva 123 (118); Henry Olonga 2/60 (10 overs)

Sri Lanka Board XI won by 5 wickets
Paikiasothy Saravanamuttu Stadium, Colombo
Umpires: Lalith Jayasundara (SL) and Ranmore Martinesz (SL)

- Sri Lanka Board XI, who chose to field

== Test series ==
=== 1st Test ===
27 – 31 December
Scorecard

Sri Lanka	v	Zimbabwe
586/6d (161 overs); Kumar Sangakkara 128 (186); Heath Streak 3/113 (34 overs)		184 (79.5 overs); Andy Flower 42 (122); Muttiah Muralitharan 4/53 (26 overs)
		236 (101.2 overs) (f/o); Travis Friend 44 (142); Muttiah Muralitharan 4/35 (36 overs)

Sri Lanka won by an innings and 166 runs
Sinhalese Sports Club Ground, Colombo
Umpires: Peter Manuel (SL) and Riazuddin (Pak)
Player of the match: Kumar Sangakkara

- Zimbabwe won the toss and elected to field.
- Rain interrupted play on Day 4 and play commenced at 4.10pm and was scheduled to end at 6.30pm.
- Day 1, play abandoned at 4:49pm due to bad weather.

=== 2nd Test ===
4 – 7 January
Scorecard

Zimbabwe	v	Sri Lanka
236 (97 overs); Grant Flower 72 (184); Muttiah Muralitharan 9/51 (40 overs)		505 (148.5 overs); Sanath Jayasuriya 139 (212); Travis Friend 3/97 (26 overs)
175 (72.4 overs); Gavin Rennie 68 (134); Muttiah Muralitharan 4/64 (26.4 overs)

Sri Lanka won by an innings and 94 runs
Asgiriya Stadium, Kandy
Umpires: Asoka de Silva (SL) and Srinivas Venkataraghavan (Ind)
Player of the match: Muttiah Muralitharan (SL)

- Zimbabwe won the toss and elected to bat.

=== 3rd Test ===
12 – 15 January
Scorecard

Sri Lanka	v	Zimbabwe
418 (158.4 overs); Upul Chandana 92 (167); Dougie Marillier 4/101 (34.4 overs)		236 (134.3 overs); Trevor Gripper 83 (249); Sanath Jayasuriya 5/43 (29 overs)
212/2d (76 overs); Marvan Atapattu 100* (126); Travis Friend 1/39 (7 overs)		79 (43.3 overs); Stuart Carlisle 28 (78); Muttiah Muralitharan 4/24 (16 overs)

Sri Lanka won by 315 runs
Galle International Stadium, Galle
Umpires: David Shepherd (Eng) and Tyron Wijewardene (SL)
Player of the match: Sanath Jayasuriya (SL)

- Sri Lanka won the toss and elected to field.

== Statistics ==
=== Most runs ===
Rank	Runs	Player	Teams	Innings	Average	High Score	100	50
1	295	Sanath Jayasuriya	(Sri Lanka)	4	73.75	139	1	1
2	255	Kumar Sangakkara	(Sri Lanka)	4	63.75	128	1	1
3	216	Thilan Samaraweera	(Sri Lanka)	3	108.00	123*	1	1
4	184	Marvan Atapattu	(Sri Lanka)	4	61.33	100*	1	1
5	167	Mahela Jayawardena	(Sri Lanka)	4	55.66	76	0	2
5	167	Trevor Gripper	(Zimbabwe)	6	27.83	83	0	1
Last Updated: 1 August 2022

=== Most wickets ===
Rank	Wickets	Player	Teams	Innings	BBI	BBM	Average	Economy	5w	10w
1	30	Muttiah Muralitharan	(Sri Lanka)	6	9/51	13/115	9.80	1.44	2	1
2	9	Sanath Jayasuriya	(Sri Lanka)	6	5/43	9/74	14.44	1.91	1	0
3	8	Chaminda Vaas	(Sri Lanka)	6	2/17	3/93	35.62	2.66	0	0
4	7	Charitha Buddhika	(Sri Lanka)	6	4/27	4/40	22.71	2.89	0	0
4	7	Heath Streak	(Zimbabwe)	4	3/113	3/113	43.28	2.75	0	0
Last Updated: 1 August 2022
