= West Indian cricket team in Sri Lanka in 2001–02 =

International cricket tour

	Sri Lanka	West Indies
- Dates: 13 November 2001 – 3 December 2001
Captains	Sanath Jayasuriya	Carl Hooper

Test series
- Result: Sri Lanka won the 3-match series 3–0
Most runs	Hashan Tillakaratne (403)	Brian Lara (688)
Most wickets	Chaminda Vaas (26)	Dinanath Ramnarine (10)
- Player of the series: Brian Lara (WI)

One Day International series
- Player of the series: See 2001 LG Abans Triangular Series

The West Indies cricket team toured Sri Lanka from 13 November to 3 December 2001. The tour consisted of three Test matches and the 2001 LG Abans Triangular Series, which also included Zimbabwe.

== Squads ==
Test squads
Sri Lanka	West Indies
Sanath Jayasuriya (c)	Carl Hooper (c)
Marvan Atapattu	Daren Ganga
Kumar Sangakkara	Chris Gayle
Mahela Jayawardene	Ramnaresh Sarwan
Russel Arnold	Brian Lara
Hashan Tillakaratne	Marlon Samuels
Thilan Samaraweera	Ridley Jacobs
Chaminda Vaas	Neil McGarrell
Niroshan Bandaratilleke	Mervyn Dillon
Muttiah Muralitharan	Dinanath Ramnarine
Charitha Buddhika	Colin Stuart
Nuwan Zoysa	Pedro Collins
	Marlon Black

== Test Series ==
=== 1st Test ===
13 November 2001
Scorecard

West Indies	v	Sri Lanka
448 (141.4 overs); Brian Lara 178 (294); Muttiah Muralitharan 6/126 (53.4 overs)		590/9d (202.4 overs); Kumar Sangakkara 140 (373); Dinanath Ramnarine 3/158 (58 overs)
144 (78.3 overs); Brian Lara 40 (99); Muttiah Muralitharan 5/44 (31.3 overs)		6/0 (0.4 overs); Sanath Jayasuriya 6 (4); Colin Stuart 0/6 (0.4 overs)

Sri Lanka won by 10 wickets
Galle International Stadium
Umpires: John Hampshire (Eng) & Peter Manuel (SL)
Player of the match: Muttiah Muralitharan (SL)

- West Indies, who chose to bat
- 12th man: Suresh Perera (SL), Leon Garrick (WI)

=== 2nd Test ===
21 November 2001
Scorecard

Sri Lanka	v	West Indies
288 (96.4 overs); Mahela Jayawardene 88 (146); Pedro Collins 4/78 (27 overs)		191 (66.4 overs); Brian Lara 74 (154); Muttiah Muralitharan 4/54 (23.4 overs)
224/6d (67 overs); Marvan Atapattu 84 (169); Dinanath Ramnarine 4/66 (16 overs)		190 (83.5 overs); Marlon Samuels 54 (117); Muttiah Muralitharan 6/81 (35.5 overs)

Sri Lanka won by 131 runs
Asgiriya Stadium, Kandy
Umpires: John Hampshire (Eng) & Gamini Silva (SL)
Player of the match: Muttiah Muralitharan (SL)

- Sri Lanka, who chose to bat
- 12th man Upul Chandana (SL), Wavell Hinds (WI)

=== 3rd Test ===
29 November 2001
Scorecard

West Indies	v	Sri Lanka
390 (113.2 overs); Brian Lara 221 (354); Chaminda Vaas 7/120 (32.2 overs)		627/9d (197 overs); Hashan Tillakaratne 204 (343); Pedro Collins 3/156 (47 overs)
262 (82 overs); Brian Lara 130 (215); Chaminda Vaas 7/71 (25 overs)		27/0 (5.3 overs); Marvan Atapattu 19 (18); Mervyn Dillon 0/12 (3 overs)

Sri Lanka won by 10 wickets
Sinhalese Sports Club Ground, Colombo
Umpires: Asoka de Silva (SL) & Russell Tiffin (Zim)
Player of the match: Brian Lara (WI)

- West Indies, who chose to bat
- 12th man Upul Chandana (SL), Wavell Hinds (WI)

== ODI Series ==
The ODI series was the 2001 LG Abans Triangular Series which also included Zimbabwe.
