= Indian cricket team in Sri Lanka in 2008 =

	India	Sri Lanka
- Dates: 18 July – 29 August 2008
Captains	Anil Kumble (Tests); MS Dhoni (ODIs)	Mahela Jayawardene

Test series
- Result: Sri Lanka won the 3-match series 2–1
Most runs	Virender Sehwag (344)	Mahela Jayawardene (279)
Most wickets	Harbhajan Singh (16)	Ajantha Mendis (26)
- Player of the series: Ajantha Mendis (SL)

One Day International series
- Results: India won the 5-match series 3–2
Most runs	MS Dhoni (193)	Mahela Jayawardene (185)
Most wickets	Zaheer Khan (9)	Ajantha Mendis (13)
- Player of the series: MS Dhoni (Ind)

The India national cricket team toured Sri Lanka from 23 July to 29 August.

== Squads ==
Tests		ODIs	
Sri Lanka	India	Sri Lanka	India
Mahela Jayawardene (c); Tillakaratne Dilshan; Prasanna Jayawardene (wk); Chamara Kapugedera; Nuwan Kulasekara; Ajantha Mendis; Muttiah Muralitharan; Dhammika Prasad; Thilan Samaraweera; Kumar Sangakkara; Chamara Silva; Thilan Thushara; Chaminda Vaas; Michael Vandort; Malinda Warnapura	Anil Kumble (c); Virender Sehwag (vc); Gautam Gambhir; Rahul Dravid; Sachin Tendulkar; Sourav Ganguly; VVS Laxman; Rohit Sharma; Dinesh Karthik (wk); Parthiv Patel (wk); Harbhajan Singh; Ishant Sharma; Zaheer Khan; RP Singh; Munaf Patel; Pragyan Ojha	Mahela Jayawardene (c); Tillakaratne Dilshan; Dilhara Fernando; Sanath Jayasuriya; Chamara Kapugedera; Nuwan Kulasekara; Ajantha Mendis; Jehan Mubarak; Muttiah Muralitharan; Kumar Sangakkara (wk); Chamara Silva; Thilan Thushara; Mahela Udawatte; Chaminda Vaas; Malinda Warnapura; ~~Kaushalya Weeraratne~~	MS Dhoni (c & wk); Yuvraj Singh (vc); ~~Virender Sehwag (vc)~~; ~~Sachin Tendulkar~~; Gautam Gambhir; Rohit Sharma; Suresh Raina; Virat Kohli; Parthiv Patel (wk); Irfan Pathan; Praveen Kumar; Harbhajan Singh; Zaheer Khan; RP Singh; Munaf Patel; Pragyan Ojha; S Badrinath

== Test Series ==
=== 1st Test ===
23–27 July
Scorecard

Sri Lanka	v	India
600/6d (162 overs); Mahela Jayawardene 136 (259); Ishant Sharma 2/124 (33 overs)		223 (72.5 overs); VVS Laxman 56 (118); Muttiah Muralitharan 5/84 (29 overs)
		138 (45 overs) (f/o); Gautam Gambhir 43 (90); Muttiah Muralitharan 6/26 (13 overs)

Sri Lanka won by an innings and 239 runs
Sinhalese Sports Club Ground, Colombo
Umpires: Mark Benson (Eng) and Billy Doctrove (WI)
Player of the match: Muttiah Muralitharan (SL)

- Sri Lanka won the toss and elected to bat.
- Bad light ended play early on day 1 as well as day 3.
- Ajantha Mendis (SL) made his Test debut.

=== 2nd Test ===
31 July – 4 August
Scorecard

India	v	Sri Lanka
329 (82 overs); Virender Sehwag 201* (231); Ajantha Mendis 6/117 (28 overs)		292 (93.3 overs); Mahela Jayawardene 86(188); Harbhajan Singh 6/102 (40.3 overs)
269 (76.2 overs); Gautam Gambhir 74 (149); Ajantha Mendis 4/92 (27.2 overs)		136 (47.3 overs); Thilan Samaraweera 67* (126); Harbhajan Singh 4/51 (14 overs)

India won by 170 runs
Galle International Stadium, Galle
Umpires: Billy Doctrove (WI) and Rudi Koertzen (SA)
Player of the match: Virender Sehwag (Ind)

- India won the toss and elected to bat.
- Bad light ended play early on day 1 as well as day 3.

=== 3rd Test ===
8–12 August
Scorecard

India	v	Sri Lanka
249 (80 overs); Gautam Gambhir 72 (128); Ajantha Mendis 5/56 (28 overs)		396 (134.2 overs); Kumar Sangakkara 144 (288); Harbhajan Singh 3/104 (40.3 overs)
268 (87.5 overs); Rahul Dravid 68 (166); Ajantha Mendis 3/81 (34 overs)		123/2 (33.1 overs); Malinda Warnapura 54* (99); Zaheer Khan 1/22 (6 overs)

Sri Lanka won by 8 wickets
Paikiasothy Saravanamuttu Stadium, Colombo
Umpires: Mark Benson (Eng) and Rudi Koertzen (SA)
Player of the match: Kumar Sangakkara (SL)

- India won the toss and elected to bat.
- Bad light ended play early on day 2.
- Dhammika Prasad (SL) made his Test debut.

== ODI series ==
=== 1st ODI ===
18 August
Scorecard

India; 146 (46 overs)	v	Sri Lanka; 147/2 (34.5 overs)
Yuvraj Singh 23 (30); Ajantha Mendis 3/21 (9 overs)		Mahela Jayawardene 62* (80); Munaf Patel 2/32 (9 overs)

Sri Lanka won by 8 wickets
Rangiri Dambulla International Stadium, Dambulla
Umpires: Asoka de Silva (SL) and Billy Doctrove (WI)
Player of the match: Ajantha Mendis (SL)

- India won the toss and elected to bat.
- Virat Kohli (Ind) made his ODI debut.

=== 2nd ODI ===
20 August
Scorecard

Sri Lanka; 142 (38.4 overs)	v	India; 143/7 (39.5 overs)
Thilan Thushara 44 (46); Zaheer Khan 4/21 (9.5 overs)		Mahendra Singh Dhoni 39 (54); Ajantha Mendis 2/22 (10 overs)

India won by 3 wickets
Rangiri Dambulla International Stadium, Dambulla
Umpires: Billy Doctrove (WI) and Gamini Silva (SL)
Player of the match: Zaheer Khan (Ind)

- India won the toss and elected to field.
- Subramaniam Badrinath (Ind) made his ODI debut.

=== 3rd ODI ===
24 August
Scorecard

India; 237/9 (50 overs)	v	Sri Lanka; 204 (49 overs)
Mahendra Singh Dhoni 76 (80); Ajantha Mendis 3/56 (10 overs)		Mahela Jayawardene 94 (111); Munaf Patel 3/42 (10 overs)

India won by 33 runs
R Premadasa Stadium, Colombo
Umpires: Billy Doctrove (WI) and Tyron Wijewardene (SL)
Player of the match: Mahendra Singh Dhoni (Ind)

- India won the toss and elected to bat.

=== 4th ODI ===
27 August
Scorecard

India; 258 (49.4 overs)	v	Sri Lanka; 212 (46.3 overs)
Suresh Raina 76 (78); Thilan Thushara 5/47 (8.4 overs)		Sanath Jayasuriya 60 (52); Harbhajan Singh 3/40 (10 overs)

India won by 46 runs
R Premadasa Stadium, Colombo
Umpires: Billy Doctrove (WI) and Gamini Silva (SL)
Player of the match: Suresh Raina (Ind)

- India won the toss and elected to bat.

=== 5th ODI ===
29 August
Scorecard

Sri Lanka; 227/6 (50 overs)	v	India; 103 (26.3 overs)
Thilan Thushara 54 (46); Pragyan Ojha 2/28 (10 overs)		Virat Kohli 31 (46); Ajantha Mendis 4/10 (4.3 overs)

Sri Lanka won by 112 runs (D/L method)
R Premadasa Stadium, Colombo
Umpires: Billy Doctrove (WI) and Tyron Wijewardene (SL)
Player of the match: Nuwan Kulasekara (SL)

- Sri Lanka won the toss and elected to bat.
