= 2006 Unitech Cup =

- Date: 16th – 29th August 2006
- Location: Colombo, Sri Lanka
- Result: Series Cancelled
Teams
Sri Lanka	India	South Africa
Captains
(Sri Lanka) Mahela Jayawardene	(India) Rahul Dravid	(South Africa) Mark Boucher
Most runs
Most wickets

The Unitech Cup 2006 was 3 match bilateral One-Day cricket contest between home team Sri Lanka and India. The Unitech Cup was originally a Triangular One-Day Cricket Tournament to be held in Sri Lanka, between Sri Lanka, India and South Africa. However, South Africa pulled out due to safety issues regarding a nearby bomb blast in Colombo, not far from the stadium. The tournaments fixtures were to be held originally in the cities of Dambulla and Colombo, but were later revised to be played only in Colombo. Each team was to play 4 matches, 2 against each opponent, with the best 2 teams qualifying for the final. Despite statistics pointing out Sri Lanka to be favourites at home, the series was tipped to be one of the most competitive tournaments in a while. This was despite many key injuries in the South African squad.

== Squads ==
Sri Lanka	India	South Africa
Mahela Jayawardene (c); Kumar Sangakkara (vc & wk); Upul Tharanga; Sanath Jayasuriya; Tillakaratne Dilshan; Marvan Atapattu; Chamara Kapugedera; Chaminda Vaas; Farveez Maharoof; Lasith Malinga; Dilhara Fernando; Muttiah Muralitharan; Malinga Bandara; Ruchira Perera; Prasanna Jayawardene (wk)	Rahul Dravid (c); Virender Sehwag (vc); Sachin Tendulkar; Yuvraj Singh; Mohammad Kaif; Suresh Raina; MS Dhoni (wk); Irfan Pathan; Sreesanth; Harbhajan Singh; Ramesh Powar; Ajit Agarkar; Munaf Patel; RP Singh; Dinesh Mongia	Mark Boucher (c & wk); Shaun Pollock (vc); Boeta Dippenaar; Loots Bosman; Herschelle Gibbs; AB de Villiers; Johan van der Wath; Robin Peterson; Andrew Hall; André Nel; Makhaya Ntini; Ashwell Prince; Roger Telemachus; Thandi Tshabalala

== Safety issues ==
On the eve of the tournament, the opening match, between Sri Lanka and South Africa, on 14 August 2006, was called off due to torrential rain. With reserve days for each scheduled match, this was not a major issue, but a bomb blast that occurred only 2 kilometres away from the stadium endangered the tournament. This was due to increased concerns from the South African players, who were ready to pull out, but were willing to continue playing if Security Evaluations deemed it safe. An official statement from the South African Cricket Board was made, stating that the team would pull out, due to the current risk being at an "unacceptable level".

The Sri Lankan board persuaded the Board of Cricket Control of India to consider a 5-match Bilateral series, but the BCCI accepted a 3-match series.

A revised fixtures list was released after the considerable delay and the decision made by the South Africans.

== League stage ==
=== Postponed match ===
14 - 15 August 2006
Scorecard

Sri Lanka	v	South Africa

Match abandoned
R. Premadasa Stadium, Colombo
Umpires: Billy Bowden (NZ) and Asoka de Silva (SL)

- Play called off due to wet outfield.

=== 1st match ===
16 August 2006
Scorecard

Sri Lanka	v	India

Match abandoned
R. Premadasa Stadium, Colombo
Umpires: Billy Bowden (NZ) and Tyron Wijewardene (SL)

- Play called off due to wet outfield.
- Match was originally to continue on the reserve day, but the game was abandoned after South Africa pulled out of the tournament and a three match series between Sri Lanka and India was scheduled to replace it.

=== 2nd match ===
19 August 2006
Scorecard

India	v	South Africa

Match abandoned
Sinhalese Sports Club Ground, Colombo
Umpires: Billy Bowden (NZ) and Asoka de Silva (SL)

=== 3rd match ===
21 August 2006
Scorecard

Sri Lanka	v	South Africa

Match abandoned
R. Premadasa Stadium, Colombo
Umpires: Billy Bowden (NZ) and Tyron Wijewardene (SL)

=== 4th match ===
24 August 2006
Scorecard

Sri Lanka	v	India

Match abandoned
R. Premadasa Stadium, Colombo
Umpires: Aleem Dar (Pak) and Asoka de Silva (SL)

=== 5th match ===
26 August 2006
Scorecard

India	v	South Africa

Match abandoned
R. Premadasa Stadium, Colombo
Umpires: Aleem Dar (Pak) and Tyron Wijewardene (SL)

=== 6th match ===
29 August 2006
Scorecard

Sri Lanka	v	South Africa

Match abandoned
R. Premadasa Stadium, Colombo
Umpires: Asoka de Silva (SL) and Billy Bowden (NZ)
