= International cricket in 2000 =

Season of Cricket

The 2000 international cricket season was from May 2000 to September 2000.

== Season overview ==
International tours
Start date	Home team	Away team	Results [Matches]			
Start date	Home team	Away team	Test	ODI	FC	LA
5 May 2000	West Indies	Pakistan	1–0 [3]	—	—	—
18 May 2000	England	Zimbabwe	1–0 [2]	—	—	—
14 June 2000	Sri Lanka	Pakistan	0–2 [3]	—	—	—
15 June 2000	England	West Indies	3–1 [5]	—	—	—
4 July 2000	Sri Lanka	South Africa	1–1 [2]	—	—	—
16 August 2000	Australia	South Africa	—	1–1 [3]	—	—
International tournaments
Start date	Tournament				Winners	
1 April 2000	(Cricket West Indies) 2000 Cable & Wireless ODI Series				Pakistan	
29 May 2000	(Bangladesh) 2000 Asia Cup				Pakistan	
5 July 2000	(Sri Lanka) 2000 Singer Triangular Series				Sri Lanka	
6 July 2000	(England) 2000 NatWest Triangular Series				England	
20 August 2000	2000 Singapore Challenge				South Africa	

== April ==
=== 2000 Cable & Wireless ODI Series ===
Pos	Team	P	W	L	NR	T	NRR	Points
1	West Indies	4	4	0	0	0	8	+1.205
2	Pakistan	4	2	2	0	0	4	−0.364
3	Zimbabwe	4	0	4	0	0	0	−0.884

Group stage
No.	Date	Team 1	Captain 1	Team 2	Captain 2	Venue	Result
ODI 1584	1 April	West Indies	Jimmy Adams	Zimbabwe	Andy Flower	Sabina Park, Kingston	West Indies by 87 runs
ODI 1585	2 April	West Indies	Jimmy Adams	Zimbabwe	Andy Flower	Sabina Park, Kingston	West Indies by 41 runs
ODI 1586	5 April	Pakistan	Moin Khan	Zimbabwe	Andy Flower	Antigua Recreation Ground, St John's	Pakistan by 5 wickets
ODI 1588	12 April	West Indies	Jimmy Adams	Pakistan	Moin Khan	Arnos Vale Ground, Kingstown	West Indies by 96 runs
ODI 1590	15 April	Pakistan	Moin Khan	Zimbabwe	Andy Flower	National Cricket Stadium, St George's	Pakistan by 6 wickets
Finals
No.	Date	Team 1	Captain 1	Team 2	Captain 2	Venue	Result
ODI 1593	19 April	West Indies	Jimmy Adams	Pakistan	Moin Khan	Kensington Oval, Bridgetown	Pakistan by 18 runs
ODI 1594	19 April	West Indies	Jimmy Adams	Pakistan	Moin Khan	Queen's Park Oval, Port of Spain	West Indies by 60 runs
ODI 1595	23 April	West Indies	Jimmy Adams	Pakistan	Moin Khan	Queen's Park Oval, Port of Spain	Pakistan by 4 wickets

== May ==
=== Pakistan in the West Indies ===
Test series
No.	Date	Home captain	Away captain	Venue	Result
Test 1494	5-9 May 2000	Jimmy Adams	Moin Khan	Bourda, Georgetown	Match drawn
Test 1496	18-22 May 2000	Jimmy Adams	Moin Khan	Kensington Oval, Bridgetown	Match drawn
Test 1497	25-29 May 2000	Jimmy Adams	Moin Khan	Antigua Recreation Ground, St John's	West Indies won by 1 wicket

=== Zimbabwe in England ===
Test series
No.	Date	Home captain	Away captain	Venue	Result
Test 1495	18–21 May	Nasser Hussain	Andy Flower	Lord's, London	England by an innings and 209 runs
Test 1498	1–5 June	Nasser Hussain	Andy Flower	Trent Bridge, Nottingham	Match drawn

=== 2000 Asia Cup ===
Pos	Team	Pld	W	L	NR	Pts	NRR
1	Pakistan	3	3	0	0	6	+1.920
2	Sri Lanka	3	2	1	0	4	+1.077
3	India	3	1	2	0	2	−0.416
4	Bangladesh	3	0	3	0	0	−2.800

Group stage
No.	Date	Team 1	Captain 1	Team 2	Captain 2	Venue	Result
ODI 1596	29 May	Bangladesh	Aminul Islam	Sri Lanka	Sanath Jayasuriya	Bangabandhu National Stadium, Dhaka	Sri Lanka by 9 wickets
ODI 1597	30–31 May	Bangladesh	Aminul Islam	India	Saurav Ganguly	Bangabandhu National Stadium, Dhaka	India by 8 wickets
ODI 1598	1 June	India	Saurav Ganguly	Sri Lanka	Sanath Jayasuriya	Bangabandhu National Stadium, Dhaka	Sri Lanka by 71 runs
ODI 1599	2 June	Bangladesh	Aminul Islam	Pakistan	Moin Khan	Bangabandhu National Stadium, Dhaka	Pakistan by 233 runs
ODI 1600	3 June	India	Saurav Ganguly	Pakistan	Moin Khan	Bangabandhu National Stadium, Dhaka	Pakistan by 44 runs
ODI 1601	5 June	Pakistan	Moin Khan	Sri Lanka	Sanath Jayasuriya	Bangabandhu National Stadium, Dhaka	Pakistan by 7 wickets
Final
No.	Date	Team 1	Captain 1	Team 2	Captain 2	Venue	Result
ODI 1602	7 June	Pakistan	Moin Khan	Sri Lanka	Sanath Jayasuriya	Bangabandhu National Stadium, Dhaka	Pakistan by 39 runs

== June ==
=== Pakistan in Sri Lanka ===
Test series
No.	Date	Home captain	Away captain	Venue	Result
Test 1499	14-17 June 2000	Sanath Jayasuriya	Moin Khan	Sinhalese Sports Club Ground, Colombo	Pakistan won by 5 wickets
Test 1501	21-24 June 2000	Sanath Jayasuriya	Moin Khan	Galle International Stadium, Galle	Pakistan won by an innings and 163 runs
Test 1502	28 June-2 July 2000	Sanath Jayasuriya	Moin Khan	Asgiriya Stadium, Kandy	Match drawn

== July ==
=== West Indies in England ===
Test series
No.	Date	Home captain	Away captain	Venue	Result
Test 1500	15–17 June	Nasser Hussain	Jimmy Adams	Edgbaston Cricket Ground, Birmingham	West Indies won by an innings and 93 runs
Test 1503	29 June–1 July	Alec Stewart	Jimmy Adams	Lord's, London	England won by 2 wickets
Test 1506	3–7 August	Nasser Hussain	Jimmy Adams	Old Trafford Cricket Ground, Manchester	Match drawn
Test 1508	17–18 August	Nasser Hussain	Jimmy Adams	Headingley Cricket Ground, Leeds	England won by an innings and 39 runs
Test 1509	31 August–4 September	Nasser Hussain	Jimmy Adams	Kennington Oval, London	England won by 158 runs

=== 2000 NatWest Triangular Series ===
Team	Pld	W	L	NR	Pts
Zimbabwe	6	4	2	0	8
England	6	3	2	1	7
West Indies	6	1	4	1	3

Group stage
No.	Date	Team 1	Captain 1	Team 2	Captain 2	Venue	Result
ODI 1605	6 July	West Indies	Jimmy Adams	Zimbabwe	Andy Flower	County Ground, Bristol	Zimbabwe by 6 wickets
ODI 1607	8 July	England	Alec Stewart	Zimbabwe	Andy Flower	Kennington Oval, London	Zimbabwe by 5 wickets
ODI 1609	9 July	England	Alec Stewart	West Indies	Jimmy Adams	Lord's, London	No result
ODI 1611	11 July	West Indies	Jimmy Adams	Zimbabwe	Andy Flower	St Lawrence Ground, Canterbury	Zimbabwe by 70 runs
ODI 1613	13 July	England	Alec Stewart	Zimbabwe	Andy Flower	Old Trafford Cricket Ground, Manchester	England by 8 wickets
ODI 1615	15 July	England	Alec Stewart	West Indies	Jimmy Adams	Riverside Ground, Chester-le-Street	England by 10 wickets
ODI 1616	16 July	West Indies	Jimmy Adams	Zimbabwe	Andy Flower	Riverside Ground, Chester-le-Street	Zimbabwe by 6 wickets
ODI 1617	18 July	England	Nasser Hussain	Zimbabwe	Andy Flower	Edgbaston Cricket Ground, Birmingham	England by 52 runs
ODI 1618	20 July	England	Nasser Hussain	West Indies	Jimmy Adams	Trent Bridge, Nottingham	England by 10 wickets
Final
No.	Date	Team 1	Captain 1	Team 2	Captain 2	Venue	Result
ODI 1619	22 July	England	Nasser Hussain	Zimbabwe	Andy Flower	Lord's, London	England by 6 wickets

=== 2000 Singer Triangular Series ===
Team	P	W	L	T	NR	NRR	Points
Sri Lanka	4	4	0	0	0		8
South Africa	4	2	2	0	0		4
Pakistan	4	0	4	0	0		0

Group stage
No.	Date	Team 1	Captain 1	Team 2	Captain 2	Venue	Result
ODI 1603	5 July	Sri Lanka	Sanath Jayasuriya	Pakistan	Moin Khan	Galle International Stadium, Galle	Sri Lanka by 5 wickets
ODI 1604	6 July	Sri Lanka	Sanath Jayasuriya	South Africa	Shaun Pollock	Galle International Stadium, Galle	Sri Lanka by 37 runs
ODI 1606	8 July	Pakistan	Moin Khan	South Africa	Shaun Pollock	R Premadasa Stadium, Colombo	South Africa by 18 runs
ODI 1608	9 July	Sri Lanka	Sanath Jayasuriya	Pakistan	Moin Khan	R Premadasa Stadium, Colombo	Sri Lanka by 6 wickets
ODI 1610	11 July	Sri Lanka	Sanath Jayasuriya	South Africa	Shaun Pollock	Sinhalese Sports Club Ground, Colombo	Sri Lanka by 8 wickets
ODI 1612	12 July	Pakistan	Moin Khan	South Africa	Shaun Pollock	Sinhalese Sports Club Ground, Colombo	South Africa by 18 runs
Final
No.	Date	Team 1	Captain 1	Team 2	Captain 2	Venue	Result
ODI 1614	14 July	Sri Lanka	Sanath Jayasuriya	South Africa	Shaun Pollock	R Premadasa Stadium, Colombo	Sri Lanka by 30 runs

=== South Africa in Sri Lanka ===
Test series
No.	Date	Home captain	Away captain	Venue	Result
Test 1504	20–23 July	Sanath Jayasuriya	Shaun Pollock	Galle International Stadium, Galle	Sri Lanka won by an innings and 15 runs
Test 1505	30 July–2 August	Sanath Jayasuriya	Shaun Pollock	Asgiriya Stadium, Kandy	South Africa won by 7 runs
Test 1507	6–10 August	Sanath Jayasuriya	Shaun Pollock	Sinhalese Sports Club Ground, Colombo	Match drawn

== August ==
=== South Africa in Australia ===
ODI series
No.	Date	Home captain	Away captain	Venue	Result
ODI 1620	16 August 2000	Steve Waugh	Shaun Pollock	Docklands Stadium, Melbourne	Australia won by 94 runs
ODI 1621	18 August 2000	Steve Waugh	Shaun Pollock	Docklands Stadium, Melbourne	Match tied
ODI 1622	20 August 2000	Steve Waugh	Shaun Pollock	Docklands Stadium, Melbourne	South Africa won by 8 runs

=== 2000 Singapore Challenge Trophy ===
Team	P	W	L	T	NR	Points	NRR
Pakistan	2	2	0	0	0	4	+0.533
South Africa	2	1	1	0	0	2	+0.412
New Zealand	2	0	2	0	0	0	−1.439

Group stage
No.	Date	Team 1	Captain 1	Team 2	Captain 2	Venue	Result
ODI 1623	20 August	Pakistan	Waqar Younis	New Zealand	Stephen Fleming	Kallang Ground, Singapore	Pakistan by 12 runs
ODI 1624	23 August	Pakistan	Waqar Younis	South Africa	Shaun Pollock	Kallang Ground, Singapore	Pakistan by 28 runs
ODI 1625	25 August	New Zealand	Stephen Fleming	South Africa	Shaun Pollock	Kallang Ground, Singapore	South Africa by 8 wickets
Final
No.	Date	Team 1	Captain 1	Team 2	Captain 2	Venue	Result
ODI 1626	27 August	Pakistan	Waqar Younis	South Africa	Shaun Pollock	Kallang Ground, Singapore	South Africa by 93 runs (D/L method)
