= International cricket in 2001 =

Cricket season

The 2001 international cricket season was from May to August 2001.

== Season overview ==
International tours
Start date	Home team	Away team	Results [Matches]	
Start date	Home team	Away team	Test	ODI
17 May 2001	England	Pakistan	1-1 [2]	—
7 June 2001	Zimbabwe	India	1-1 [2]	—
5 July 2001	England	Australia	1-4 [5]	—
19 July 2001	Zimbabwe	West Indies	0-1 [2]	—
14 August 2001	Sri Lanka	India	2-1 [3]	—
15 August 2001	Kenya	West Indies	—	0-3 [3]
International tournaments
Dates	Tournament		Winners	
7 June 2001	(England) 2001 NatWest Series		Australia	
23 June 2001	2001 Zimbabwe Coca-Cola Cup		West Indies	
18 July 2001	2001 Sri Lanka Coca-Cola Cup		Sri Lanka	
29 August 2001	(Pakistan) (Sri Lanka) Asian Test Challenge		Sri Lanka	

== May ==
=== Pakistan in England ===
Test series
No.	Date	Home captain	Away captain	Venue	Result
Test 1546	17–20 May	Nasser Hussain	Waqar Younis	Lord's Cricket Ground, London	England by an innings and 9 runs
Test 1547	31 May–4 June	Nasser Hussain	Waqar Younis	Old Trafford Cricket Ground, Manchester	Pakistan by 108 runs

== June ==
=== India in Zimbabwe ===
Test series
No.	Date	Home captain	Away captain	Venue	Result
Test 1548	7–10 June	Heath Streak	Saurav Ganguly	Queens Sports Club, Bulawayo	India by 8 wickets
Test 1549	15–18 June	Heath Streak	Saurav Ganguly	Harare Sports Club, Harare	Zimbabwe by 4 wickets

=== 2001 NatWest Series ===
Team	Pld	W	L	NR	Pts
Australia	6	4	1	1	9
Pakistan	6	4	1	1	9
England	6	0	6	0	0

Group stage
No.	Date	Team 1	Captain 1	Team 2	Captain 2	Venue	Result
ODI 1719	7 June	England	Alec Stewart	Pakistan	Waqar Younis	Edgbaston Cricket Ground, Birmingham	Pakistan by 108 runs
ODI 1720	9 June	Australia	Steve Waugh	Pakistan	Waqar Younis	Sophia Gardens, Cardiff	Australia by 7 wickets
ODI 1721	10 June	England	Alec Stewart	Australia	Steve Waugh	The Royal & Sun Alliance County Ground, Bristol	Australia by 5 wickets
ODI 1722	12 June	England	Alec Stewart	Pakistan	Waqar Younis	Lord's Cricket Ground, London	Pakistan by 2 runs
ODI 1723	14 June	England	Alec Stewart	Australia	Steve Waugh	Old Trafford Cricket Ground, Manchester	Australia by 125 runs (D/L)
ODI 1723a	16 June	Australia	Steve Waugh	Pakistan	Waqar Younis	Riverside Ground, Chester-le-Street	Match abandoned
ODI 1724	17 June	England	Alec Stewart	Pakistan	Waqar Younis	Headingley Cricket Ground, Leeds	Pakistan awarded the match
ODI 1725	19 June	Australia	Steve Waugh	Pakistan	Waqar Younis	Trent Bridge, Nottingham	Pakistan by 36 runs
ODI 1726	21 June	England	Alec Stewart	Australia	Steve Waugh	Kennington Oval, London	Australia by 8 wickets
Final
No.	Date	Team 1	Captain 1	Team 2	Captain 2	Venue	Result
ODI 1728	23 June	Australia	Steve Waugh	Pakistan	Waqar Younis	Lord's Cricket Ground, London	Australia by 9 wickets

=== 2001 Zimbabwe Coca-Cola Cup ===
Group stage
No.	Date	Team 1	Captain 1	Team 2	Captain 2	Venue	Result
ODI 1727	23 June	Zimbabwe	Grant Flower	West Indies	Carl Hooper	Harare Sports Club, Harare	West Indies by 27 runs
ODI 1729	24 June	Zimbabwe	Heath Streak	India	Saurav Ganguly	Harare Sports Club, Harare	India by 9 wickets
ODI 1730	27 June	Zimbabwe	Guy Whittall	India	Saurav Ganguly	Queens Sports Club, Bulawayo	India by 4 wickets
ODI 1731	30 June	India	Saurav Ganguly	West Indies	Carl Hooper	Queens Sports Club, Bulawayo	India by 6 wickets
ODI 1732	1 July	Zimbabwe	Heath Streak	West Indies	Carl Hooper	Queens Sports Club, Bulawayo	West Indies by 5 wickets
ODI 1733	4 July	India	Saurav Ganguly	West Indies	Carl Hooper	Harare Sports Club, Harare	India by 6 wickets
Final
No.	Date	Team 1	Captain 1	Team 2	Captain 2	Venue	Result
ODI 1734	7 July	India	Saurav Ganguly	West Indies	Carl Hooper	Harare Sports Club, Harare	West Indies by 16 runs

== July ==
=== Australia in England ===
The Ashes series
No.	Date	Home captain	Away captain	Venue	Result
Test 1550	5–8 July	Nasser Hussain	Steve Waugh	Edgbaston, Birmingham	Australia by an innings and 118 runs
Test 1552	19–22 July	Mike Atherton	Steve Waugh	Lord's, London	Australia by 8 wickets
Test 1554	2–4 August	Mike Atherton	Steve Waugh	Trent Bridge, Nottingham	Australia by 7 wickets
Test 1556	16–20 August	Nasser Hussain	Adam Gilchrist	Headingley, Leeds	England by 6 wickets
Test 1558	23–27 August	Nasser Hussain	Steve Waugh	The Oval, London	Australia by an innings and 25 runs

=== 2001 Sri Lanka Coca-Cola Cup ===
Group stage
No.	Date	Team 1	Captain 1	Team 2	Captain 2	Venue	Result
ODI 1735	18 July	Sri Lanka	Sanath Jayasuriya	New Zealand	Stephen Fleming	R Premadasa Stadium, Colombo	Sri Lanka by 16 runs
ODI 1736	20 July	India	Saurav Ganguly	New Zealand	Stephen Fleming	R Premadasa Stadium, Colombo	New Zealand by 84 runs
ODI 1737	22 July	Sri Lanka	Sanath Jayasuriya	India	Saurav Ganguly	R Premadasa Stadium, Colombo	Sri Lanka by 6 runs
ODI 1738	25 July	Sri Lanka	Sanath Jayasuriya	New Zealand	Stephen Fleming	R Premadasa Stadium, Colombo	Sri Lanka by 5 wickets
ODI 1739	26 July	India	Saurav Ganguly	New Zealand	Craig McMillan	R Premadasa Stadium, Colombo	New Zealand by 67 runs
ODI 1740	28 July	Sri Lanka	Sanath Jayasuriya	India	Saurav Ganguly	R Premadasa Stadium, Colombo	India by 7 wickets
ODI 1741	31 July	Sri Lanka	Sanath Jayasuriya	New Zealand	Stephen Fleming	Sinhalese Sports Club Ground, Colombo	Sri Lanka by 106 runs
ODI 1742	1 August	Sri Lanka	Sanath Jayasuriya	India	Saurav Ganguly	Sinhalese Sports Club Ground, Colombo	India by 46 runs
ODI 1743	2 August	India	Saurav Ganguly	New Zealand	Craig McMillan	Sinhalese Sports Club Ground, Colombo	India by 7 wickets
Final
No.	Date	Team 1	Captain 1	Team 2	Captain 2	Venue	Result
ODI 1744	5 August	Sri Lanka	Sanath Jayasuriya	India	Saurav Ganguly	R Premadasa Stadium, Colombo	Sri Lanka by 121 runs

=== West Indies in Zimbabwe ===
2001 Clive Lloyd Trophy
No.	Date	Home captain	Away captain	Venue	Result
Test 1551	19–22 July	Heath Streak	Carl Hooper	Queens Sports Club, Bulawayo	West Indies by an innings and 176 runs
Test 1553	27–31 July	Heath Streak	Carl Hooper	Harare Sports Club, Harare	Match drawn

== August ==
=== India in Sri Lanka ===
Test series
No.	Date	Home captain	Away captain	Venue	Result
Test 1555	14–17 August	Sanath Jayasuriya	Sourav Ganguly	Galle International Stadium, Galle	Sri Lanka by 10 wickets
Test 1557	22–25 August	Sanath Jayasuriya	Sourav Ganguly	Asgiriya Stadium, Kandy	India by 7 wickets
Test 1559	29 August–1 September	Sanath Jayasuriya	Sourav Ganguly	Sinhalese Sports Club Ground, Colombo	Sri Lanka by an innings and 88 runs

=== West Indies in Kenya ===
ODI series
No.	Date	Home captain	Away captain	Venue	Result
ODI 1745	15 August	Maurice Odumbe	Carl Hooper	Simba Union Ground, Nairobi	West Indies by 10 wickets
ODI 1746	18 August	Maurice Odumbe	Carl Hooper	Gymkhana Club Ground, Nairobi	West Indies by 6 wickets
ODI 1747	19 August	Maurice Odumbe	Carl Hooper	Gymkhana Club Ground, Nairobi	West Indies by 7 wickets

=== 2001 Asian Test Championship ===
Group stage
No.	Date	Team 1	Captain 1	Team 2	Captain 2	Venue	Result
Test 1560	29-31 August 2001	Pakistan	Waqar Younis	Bangladesh	Naimur Rahman	Multan Cricket Stadium, Multan	Pakistan by an innings and 264 runs
Test 1561	6-8 September 2001	Sri Lanka	Sanath Jayasuriya	Bangladesh	Naimur Rahman	Sinhalese Sports Club Ground, Colombo	Sri Lanka by an innings and 137 runs
Final
Test 1592	6-10 March 2002	Pakistan	Waqar Younis	Sri Lanka	Sanath Jayasuriya	Gaddafi Stadium, Lahore	Sri Lanka by 8 wickets
