= Asian Test Challenge =

Asian Test Championship 2001-02
- Date: 8 December – 29 August - 6 March 2001
- Location: Sri Lanka and Pakistan
- Result: Sri Lanka won the 2001 Asian Test Championship
Teams
Sri Lanka	Bangladesh	Pakistan
Captains
Sanath Jayasuriya	Naimur Rahman	Waqar Younis
Most runs
Kumar Sangakkara (298)	Mohammad Ashraful (140)	Inzamam-ul-Haq (233)
Most wickets
Muttiah Muralitharan (18)	Naimur Rahman (2)	Danish Kaneria (12)

The 2001 Asian Test Championship was a Test cricket tournament held in Sri Lanka and Pakistan in August 2001. It was a tri-nation series between the national representative cricket teams of the Sri Lanka, Bangladesh and Pakistan, where India did not participated to the series. The hosts Sri Lanka won the tournament by defeating Pakistan by 8 wickets in the final.

== Squads ==
Sri Lanka	Bangladesh	Pakistan
Sanath Jayasuriya (c); Russel Arnold; Marvan Atapattu; Charitha Buddhika; Kumar Dharmasena; Mahela Jayawardene; Muttiah Muralitharan; Ruchira Perera; Ravindra Pushpakumara; Thilan Samaraweera; Kumar Sangakkara; Hashan Tillakaratne; Chaminda Vaas; Nuwan Zoysa	Naimur Rahman (c); Mohammad Ashraful; Habibul Bashar; Enamul Haque; Hasibul Hossain; Mehrab Hossain; Aminul Islam; Manjural Islam; Akram Khan; Khaled Mashud; Javed Omar; Al Sahariar; Mohammad Sharif	Waqar Younis (c); Shahid Afridi; Wasim Akram; Shoaib Akhtar; Saeed Anwar; Inzamam-ul-Haq; Faisal Iqbal; Danish Kaneria; Rashid Latif; Shoaib Malik; Abdul Razzaq; Mohammad Sami; Taufeeq Umar; Yousuf Youhana

== Matches ==
=== 1st Test ===
29–31 August 2001
Scorecard

Bangladesh	v	Pakistan
134 (41.1 overs); Mehrab Hossain 19 (45); Danish Kaneria 6/42 (13 overs)		546 (114.5 overs); Abdul Razzaq 110* (100); Mohammad Sharif 2/110 (24.5 overs)
148 (41.1 overs); Habibul Bashar 56* (97); Danish Kaneria 6/52 (15 overs)

Pakistan won by an innings and 264 runs
Multan Cricket Stadium, Multan
Umpires: Steve Bucknor (WI) and S Venkataraghavan (Ind)
Player of the match: Danish Kaneria (Pak)

- Bangladesh won the toss and elected to bat.
- Shoaib Malik and Taufeeq Umar (both Pak) made their Test debuts.
- Danish Kaneria took a ten-wicket haul.
- Points: Pakistan 24, Bangladesh 0.

=== 2nd Test ===
6–8 September 2001
Scorecard

Sri Lanka	v	Bangladesh
555/5d (103.3 overs); Marvan Atapattu 201 (259); Naimur Rahman 2/117 (30.3 overs)		90 (36.4 overs); Mohammad Ashraful 26 (53); Muttiah Muralitharan 5/13 (9.4 overs)
		328 (101.3 overs); Mohammad Ashraful 114 (212); Muttiah Muralitharan 5/98 (35.3 overs)

Sri Lanka won by an innings and 137 runs
Sinhalese Sports Club Ground, Colombo
Umpires: Rudi Koertzen (SA) and Mian Mohammad Aslam (Ban)
Player of the match: Muttiah Muralitharan (SL) and Mohammad Ashraful (Ban)

- Sri Lanka won the toss and decided to field
- Mohammad Ashraful (Ban) and Michael Vandort (Sri) made their Test debuts.
- Mohammad Ashraful (Ban) became the youngest ever player to score a Test century on debut.
- Points: Sri Lanka 24, Bangladesh 0.

=== Final ===
6-10 March 2002
Scorecard

Pakistan	v	Sri Lanka
234 (67 overs); Younis Khan 46 (66); Muttiah Muralitharan 4/55 (25 overs)		528 (139.5 overs); Kumar Sangakkara 230 (327); Mohammad Sami 4/120 (36.5 overs)
325 (101.5 overs); Inzamam-ul-Haq 99 (228); Muttiah Muralitharan 4/72 (34 overs)		33/2 (6.2 overs); Kumar Sangakkara 14* (21); Mohammad Sami 1/15 (3 overs)

Sri Lanka won by 8 wickets
Gaddafi Stadium, Lahore
Umpires: Athar Zaidi (Pak) and Daryl Harper (Aus)
Player of the match: Kumar Sangakkara (SL)

- Sri Lanka won the toss and decided to field
