= Unitech =

Unitech may refer to:

- Unitech Group, real estate developer based in Delhi, India
- UNITECH International, a union of European universities
- Papua New Guinea University of Technology
- Infogix, Inc., formerly known as Unitech Systems
- 2006 Unitech Cup, cricket contest between home team Sri Lanka and India

== See also ==
- Unitec (disambiguation)
- United Technologies
