= Coca-Cola Cup =

A Coca-Cola Cup is drinkware with The Coca-Cola Company's logo on it. It may also refer to:

== Association football competitions ==
- EFL Cup in England, known as the Coca-Cola Cup from 1992 to 1998
- Scottish League Cup, known as the Coca-Cola Cup from 1994 to 1998
- Floodlit Cup (Northern Ireland) in Northern Ireland, known as the Coca-Cola Cup from 1995 to 1998
- Federation Cup (India), known as the Coca-Cola Cup for the 1995–96 season
- Telkom Knockout in South Africa, known as the Coca-Cola Cup from 1992 to 1996, and again from 2001 to 2005
- Cypriot Cup in Cyprus, known as the Cypriot Coca-Cola Cup of First and Second Division since 1998.
- Football SA Federation Cup in Australia, known as the Coca-Cola Cup from 2011 to 2014.
- FA Challenge Cup in Botswana, known as the Coca-Cola Cup from 1992 to 2012.

== One Day International cricket competitions ==
- the name of the Sharjah Cup 1998–2000
- 2001 Sri Lanka Coca-Cola Cup
- 2001 Zimbabwe Coca-Cola Cup

== Netball competition ==
- National Bank Cup in New Zealand, known as the Coca-Cola Cup from 1998 to 2001

== See also ==
- Coca Cola GM, the Greenlandic Football Championship
