= Josephat Ababu =

Kenyan cricketer (born 1980)

Personal information
- Full name: Josephat Ababu Sorongo
- Born: 14 May 1980 (age 46); Kakamega, Kenya
- Batting: Right-handed
- Bowling: Right-arm medium-fast

International information
- National side: Kenya (1999–2006)
- ODI debut (cap 21): 25 September 1999 v Zimbabwe
- Last ODI: 15 August 2006 v Bangladesh

Career statistics
Competition	ODI	FC	LA
Matches	9	4	13
Runs scored	29	28	45
Batting average	9.66	5.60	9.00
100s/50s	0/0	0/0	0/0
Top score	17	10	17
Balls bowled	288	420	390
Wickets	3	4	4
Bowling average	85.00	43.50	91.00
5 wickets in innings	0	0	0
10 wickets in match	0	0	0
Best bowling	1/26	3/49	1/25
Catches/stumpings	1/–	1/–	2/–
- Source: Cricinfo, 12 May 2017

Josephat Ababu Sorongo (born 15 April 1980) is a former Kenyan cricketer. He is a paceman who returned to the Kenyan cricket squad for the 2004 ICC Champions Trophy after a three-year absence along with Brijal Patel, Rageb Aga and Malhar Patel, having impressed with his bowling earlier in the year against Pakistan's A team.

Ababu became one of the few bowlers to take a wicket with his first ever delivery in a One Day International when he dismissed Neil Johnson, during the Kenya v Zimbabwe match in Nairobi in 1999.
