= Unitec =

Unitec may refer to:

- UNITEC-1, a satellite
- Unitec Institute of Technology, Auckland, New Zealand
- Universidad Tecnológica de México, Mexico City, Mexico
- Universidad Tecnológica Centroamericana, Tegucigalpa and San Pedro Sula, Honduras
- Universidad Tecnológica del Centro, Carabobo, Venezuela
- UNITEC (Mexibús), a BRT station in Ecatepec de Morelos

== See also ==
- Unitech (disambiguation)
