= David Terbrugge =

South African cricketer (born 1977)

Personal information
- Full name: David John Terbrugge
- Born: 31 January 1977 (age 49); Ladysmith, KwaZulu-Natal
- Batting: Right-handed
- Bowling: Right-arm fast-medium

International information
- National side: South Africa (1998–2004)
- Test debut (cap 272): 26 November 1998 v West Indies
- Last Test: 18 March 2004 v New Zealand
- ODI debut (cap 58): 23 January 2000 v England
- Last ODI: 18 August 2000 v Australia

Domestic team information
- Years: Team
- 1996/97–2005/06: Gauteng
- 2003/04–2005/06: Lions

Career statistics
Competition	Test	ODI
Matches	7	4
Runs scored	16	5
Batting average	5.33	5.00
100s/50s	0/0	0/0
Top score	4*	5
Balls bowled	1,012	126
Wickets	20	4
Bowling average	25.85	26.25
5 wickets in innings	1	0
10 wickets in match	0	0
Best bowling	5/46	4/20
Catches/stumpings	4/–	0/–
- Source: Cricinfo, 25 August 2017

David John Terbrugge (born 31 January 1977) is a former cricketer, who played in seven Test matches and four One Day Internationals for the South Africa national cricket team between 1998 and 2004. A back injury caused his early retirement. Terbrugge bowled right-arm fast-medium deliveries and batted right-handed as a tailender.

Having been a talented player at schoolboy level, Terbrugge was part South Africa's under-19 tour of England in 1995 when he suffered a back injury and had to return home early. He was then aged 18 and the injury could have ended his career, but he recovered and became a full international bowler. He needed an ankle operation in 1999, but again he recovered well and carried on playing for South Africa.

Terbrugge took 4/20 on his ODI debut against Pakistan in 2000 and won the Player of the Match award in a South African win. He took 5/46 against Bangladesh in 2002, his best bowling in a Test match, although he did not play again for the side for a year and a half. He played domestically for Gauteng and Highveld Lions, before an injury in 2005 forced his retirement from all cricket at the age of 29.
