= Pulasthi Gunaratne =

Sri Lankan cricketer (born 1973)

Personal information
- Full name: Pulasthi Waruna Gunaratne
- Born: 27 September 1973 (age 53); Colombo, Sri Lanka
- Batting: Right-handed
- Bowling: Right-arm fast-medium
- Role: Bowler

International information
- National side: Sri Lanka (2002–2003)
- ODI debut (cap 112): 7 August 2002 v Bangladesh
- Last ODI: 18 March 2003 v Australia

Career statistics
Competition	ODI
Matches	23
Runs scored	36
Batting average	7.20
100s/50s	0/0
Top score	15*
Balls bowled	959
Wickets	27
Bowling average	33.62
5 wickets in innings	0
10 wickets in match	0
Best bowling	4/44
Catches/stumpings	3/–
- Source: Cricinfo, 27 March 2017

Pulasthi Waruna Gunaratne (born 27 September 1973), is a Sri Lankan former cricketer. He is a right-handed batsman and a right-arm medium-fast bowler.

== Playing career ==
Gunaratne did not make his international debut until 2002 despite beginning his first-class career back in 1994. An experienced first-class cricketer at the time of his Sri Lanka debut (against Bangladesh in August 2002), Gunaratne started playing for Bloomfield as early as 1993. A tricksy seam bowler, Gunaratne is also a skillful batsman. He participated in the 2003 World Cup and retired later that year.
