= Upekha Fernando =

Sri Lankan cricketer (1979–2021)

Upekha Ashantha Fernando (17 December 1979 – 26 October 2021) was a Sri Lankan first-class cricketer who played for the Sinhalese Sports Club from 1997–98 to 2002–03. He captained the Sri Lankan Under-19 team against India in 1998–99. An all-rounder, he bowled right-arm off-cutters and batted right-handed, often opening the batting.

Upekha Fernando lost his place in the team after an injury. Fernando died on 26 October 2021, at the age of 41.
