= Sameer Dighe =

Indian cricketer (born 1968)

Personal information
- Full name: Sameer Sudhakar Dighe
- Born: 8 October 1968 (age 58); Mumbai, Maharashtra
- Batting: Right-handed
- Role: Wicket-keeper

International information
- National side: India
- Test debut (cap 236): 18 March 2001 v Australia
- Last Test: 29 August 2001 v Sri Lanka
- ODI debut (cap 128): 10 January 2000 v Pakistan
- Last ODI: 5 August 2001 v Sri Lanka
- ODI shirt no.: 48

Domestic team information
- Years: Team
- 1990–2001: Mumbai (squad no. 48)

Career statistics
| Competition | Test | ODI | FC | LA |
|---|---|---|---|---|
| Matches | 6 | 23 | 83 | 107 |
| Runs scored | 141 | 256 | 3,958 | 1,379 |
| Batting average | 15.66 | 23.27 | 35.98 | 22.60 |
| 100s/50s | 0/0 | 0/1 | 10/19 | 0/8 |
| Top score | 47 | 94* | 153 | 94* |
| Catches/stumpings | 12/2 | 19/5 | 243/35 | 121/40 |
- Source: , 24 April 2016

Sameer Dighe (born 8 October 1968) is a former Indian cricketer, cricket coach & entrepreneur. He was a right-handed batsman and a wicket-keeper. His main chance at international cricket did not come until the 1999–2000 season, at which time he was 31 years of age.

== Domestic career ==
Dighe made his First-class debut for Mumbai cricket team against Gujarat cricket team during the 1990–91 Ranji Trophy season where he scored 107 runs and finished season with 440 runs in 6 innings at an average of 73.33 with one half-century and two hundreds. He played 58 matches for Mumbai cricket team in which he took 176 catches and did 23 stumping's and scored 3,054 runs. He was also captain for 1999–00 Ranji Trophy.

== International career ==
On the final day of the Third Test against Australia in Chennai, Dighe made an unbeaten 22 on debut, after a collapse during the run-chase, guiding the Indians securing a historic 2–1 series win. Sourav Ganguly later said that Dighe was to become the first-choice wicket-keeper for the country, but numerous wicket-keeping errors lead to his replacement.

== Coaching career ==
Dighe later entered coaching, serving as head coach of Hong Kong at the 2007 ICC World Cricket League Division Three tournament replacing Robin Singh. He was coach of Tripura cricket team from 2006 to 2008 as well as fielding coach of Mumbai Indians during 2008 Indian Premier League but was replaced by Jonty Rhodes.

Later, he was named as selector of Mumbai cricket team in 2009.

He is currently retired from active cricket and runs multiple outlets of laundry brand, UClean, between Pune and Mumbai
