= Aminul Islam (cricketer, born 1975) =

Bangladeshi cricketer (born 1975)

Personal information
- Full name: Mohammad Aminul Islam
- Born: 1 April 1975 (age 51); Rajshahi, Bangladesh
- Batting: Right-handed
- Bowling: Right-arm fast-medium

International information
- National side: Bangladesh (1999)
- Only ODI (cap 46): 20 March 1999 v Kenya

Domestic team information
- Years: Team
- –: Rajshahi Division

Career statistics
Competition	Tests	ODIs
Matches	–	1
Runs scored	–	1
Batting average	–	–
100s/50s	0/0	0/0
Top score	–	1*
Balls bowled	–	30
Wickets	–	1
Bowling average	–	33.00
5 wickets in innings	–	–
10 wickets in match	–	–
Best bowling	–	1/33
Catches/stumpings	–/–	–/–
- Source: ESPNcricinfo, 13 February 2006

Mohammad Aminul Islam (Bengali: মোহাম্মদ আমিনুল ইসলাম; born 1 April 1975), also known as Bhola, is a former Bangladeshi cricketer, who played in one ODI in 1999.

Aminul Islam played for the Rajshahi Division first-class side through 2003/2004, taking 71 wickets in 25 matches, with an average of 22.19. Islam's best innings was 6/57, and his best batting innings was 52 (his only half-century).
