= Brijal Patel =

Kenyan cricketer (born 1977)

Personal information
- Full name: Brijal Jagdish Patel
- Born: 14 November 1977 (age 48); Nairobi, Kenya
- Batting: Right-handed
- Bowling: Slow left-arm orthodox

International information
- National side: Kenya (2001–2006)
- ODI debut (cap 25): 19 August 2001 v West Indies
- Last ODI: 15 August 2006 v Bangladesh

Career statistics
| Competition | ODI | FC | LA |
|---|---|---|---|
| Matches | 31 | 17 | 51 |
| Runs scored | 360 | 194 | 438 |
| Batting average | 16.36 | 7.46 | 12.88 |
| 100s/50s | 0/0 | 0/1 | 0/0 |
| Top score | 44 | 59 | 44 |
| Balls bowled | 165 | 831 | 495 |
| Wickets | 4 | 3 | 15 |
| Bowling average | 40.75 | 168.00 | 28.80 |
| 5 wickets in innings | 0 | 0 | 0 |
| 10 wickets in match | 0 | 0 | 0 |
| Best bowling | 2/20 | 1/47 | 3/19 |
| Catches/stumpings | 7/– | 10/– | 13/– |
- Source: Cricinfo, 12 May 2017

Brijal Jagdish Patel (born 14 November 1977) is a former Kenyan cricketer. He is a right-handed batsman and a part-time slow left-arm bowler, and has played in 31 One-Day International matches for Kenya, as well as first-class and List A cricket.

== Domestic career ==
Though he has a first-class batting average of just 7, and has passed 50 just once for his country, he is a skilled fielder. He has played club cricket in England for Cranleigh, and was recalled to the touring squad to Zimbabwe, in February 2006, after being dropped.

== International career ==
He made his ODI debut on 19 August 2001 against West Indies, at 23 years of age. He has played in five wins for Kenya, against India, Sri Lanka, Bangladesh and Zimbabwe. His 42 against the world champions, Australia, in 2002 was particularly notable. His highest ODI batting score is 44, which was scored against Zimbabwe in 2002.

Patel has toured in provincial teams to both India and South Africa. For the Kenya ODI team he has toured to South Africa, Zimbabwe, the United Arab Emirates and Sri Lanka. He was also in the tour squad for the ICC Trophy in Malaysia.
