= Nandasena Pathirana =

Sri Lankan cricket umpire (born 1942)

Personal information
- Born: 31 December 1942 (age 83); Colombo, Sri Lanka

Umpiring information
- ODIs umpired: 13 (1993–2001)
- Source: Cricinfo, 26 May 2014

Nandasena Pathirana (born 31 December 1942) is a Sri Lankan former cricket umpire. He stood in 13 One Day International games between 1993 and 2001.

== See also ==
- List of One Day International cricket umpires
