= Dilhara Fernando =

Sri Lankan cricketer

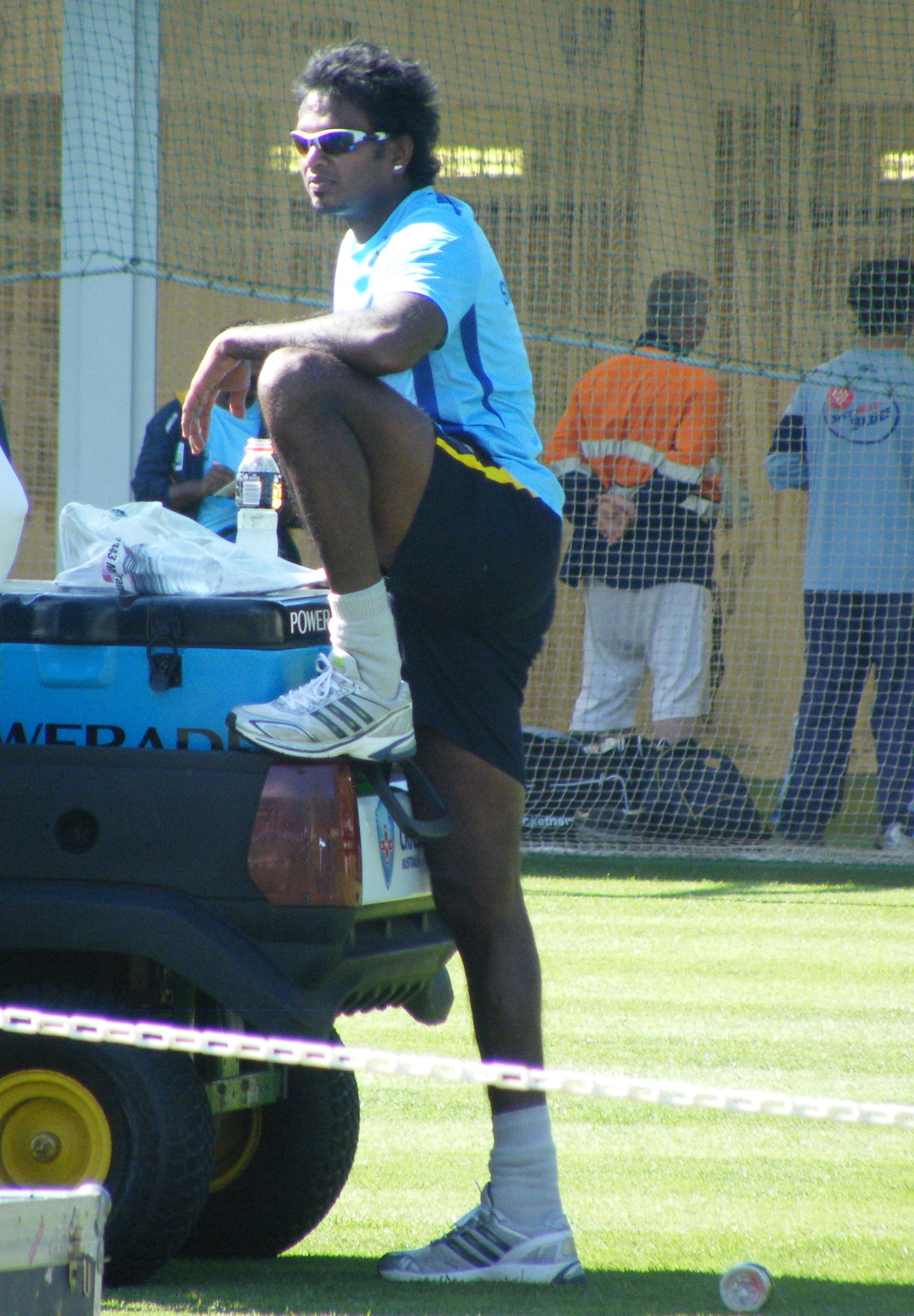
- Fernando in 2010

Personal information
- Full name: Congenige Randhi Dilhara Fernando
- Born: 19 July 1979 (age 47); Colombo, Sri Lanka
- Height: 6 ft 3 in (1.91 m)
- Batting: Right-handed
- Bowling: Right arm fast
- Role: Bowler

International information
- National side: Sri Lanka (2000–2016)
- Test debut (cap 82): 14 June 2000 v Pakistan
- Last Test: 8 July 2012 v Pakistan
- ODI debut (cap 106): 9 January 2001 v South Africa
- Last ODI: 11 January 2012 v Pakistan
- T20I debut (cap 3): 15 June 2006 v England
- Last T20I: 14 February 2016 v India

Domestic team information
- Years: Team
- 1997/98–2015/16: Sinhalese Sports Club
- 2008: Worcestershire
- 2008–2011: Mumbai Indians

Career statistics
Competition	Test	ODI	T20I	FC
Matches	40	147	18	121
Runs scored	249	239	25	590
Batting average	8.30	9.19	5.00	7.46
100s/50s	0/0	0/0	0/0	0/0
Top score	39*	20	21	42
Balls bowled	6,181	6,507	378	15,764
Wickets	100	187	18	315
Bowling average	37.84	30.20	25.77	30.46
5 wickets in innings	3	1	0	6
10 wickets in match	0	0	0	0
Best bowling	5/42	6/27	3/19	6/29
Catches/stumpings	10/–	27/–	3/-	40/–
Medal record
Men's Cricket
Representing Sri Lanka
ICC Cricket World Cup
Runner-up	2007 West-Indies
Runner-up	2011 India–Bangladesh–Sri Lanka
ICC Champions Trophy
Winner	2002 Sri Lanka
- Source: ESPNcricinfo, 11 March 2023

Congenige Randhi Dilhara Fernando (Sinhala: දිල්හාර ප්‍රනාන්දු; born 19 July 1979) is a former professional Sri Lankan international cricketer. He played as a right-handed pace bowler and was a key member of the Sri Lankan teams which finished as runners-up in the 2007 and 2011 Cricket World Cups. Fernando won the 2002 ICC Champions Trophy with his country.

Fernando is best known for his rare technique when bowling the slower ball by splitting the fingers on the ball as it is released.

== Domestic career ==
He made his Twenty20 debut on 17 August 2004, for Sinhalese Sports Club in the 2004 SLC Twenty20 Tournament. In 2008 he appeared briefly in English county cricket, playing one County Championship and two Pro40 matches at the end of the season for Worcestershire.

== International career ==
Fernando debuted for Sri Lanka in a Test Match against Pakistan at Colombo in June 2000. Six months later in a game at Durban he clocked 91.9 mph. He bowled at 93.40 mph vs Bangladesh at India. His international career however has been limited due to injury. In the period of a year he suffered two stress fracture of the back and as a result missed their home series against Australia in 2004.

In the 2010 tour of Australia, in the 3rd and final ODI at the Gabba, he clocked speeds reaching 150 kilometres per hour (93 mph).

On 13 October 2007, in the 5th game of an ODI series with England, at Colombo, Fernando took career-best bowling figures of 6 for 27, as Sri Lanka thrashed England by 107 runs. This was the first time Fernando had taken more than 4 wickets in an ODI innings, and his feat placed him 5th in the list of best ODI bowling by a Sri Lankan.

During 2007 Cricket World Cup against England, he guided the team into winning margin by just 2 runs. England required just 2 runs in the last ball of the match, where Ravi Bopara in batting. Fernando delivers a good ball and Bopara was bowled by 2 runs short.

Fernando completed the series with 158 career ODI wickets. As of 17 June 2011, only Chaminda Vaas, Sanath Jayasuriya and Muttiah Muralitharan have taken more ODI wickets for Sri Lanka (and all three have taken over 300 ODI wickets).

After three years, Fernando was recalled for the T20I series against India. He played his first international games after 4 years, on 14 February 2016 against India. Due to few runs posted by Sri Lanka, he was not able to get wickets and Sri Lanka lost the match by 9 wickets as well.

== Personal life ==
Dilhara was educated at De Mazenod College in Kandana, a suburb of Colombo. He started his school career as a basketball player but was recruited to play cricket because of his build and height.

Dilhara is a Christian.

After retirement, he migrated to the United States
