= Lalith Jayasundara =

Sri Lankan cricket umpire (born 1953)

Personal information
- Born: 4 February 1953 (age 73); Colombo, Sri Lanka

Umpiring information
- ODIs umpired: 9 (1999–2001)
- Source: Cricinfo, 20 May 2014

Lalith Vasantha Jayasundara (born 4 February 1953) is a Sri Lankan former cricket umpire. He officiated in nine international fixtures, all of them One Day International matches between 1999 and 2001.

Jayasundara, an old boy of Isipathana College, represented his school at cricket in all age groups and captained the 1st XI in 1972. He went on to play for Panadura Sports Club. He continued his cricket at the Colombo Cricket Club, Colts Cricket Club and the Wellawatte Spinning and Weaving Mills where he was employed.

== See also ==
- List of One Day International cricket umpires
