= Gamini Silva =

Sri Lankan cricketer and umpire

Mangamuni Gamini Silva (born 19 December 1960) is a Sri Lankan cricket umpire and former first-class cricketer.

Silva was born in Colombo and became a policeman. He played 12 matches of first-class cricket for Police Sports Club in the Saravanamuttu Trophy in 1995/96. An all-rounder, he scored 341 runs in 17 innings as a right-handed batsman, at an average of 22.73, including 2 half centuries, and reached a top score of 73 against Nondescripts Cricket Club in January 1996. A right-arm medium-pace bowler, he took 8 wickets at an average of 30.25, with best bowling of 2–10 against Sebastianites Cricket and Athletic Club in December 1995.

He became a regular umpire in first-class cricket in the Sri Lankan domestic 1998/99 season, and first stood as an umpire in a Test match in the 2nd Test between Sri Lanka and South Africa in Kandy in 2000. He has only stood in two other Tests - the 2nd Test between Sri Lanka and the West Indies at Kandy in 2001, and the 2nd Test between Bangladesh and Zimbabwe in Dhaka in 2005.

He joined the ICC's International Panel of Umpires and Referees in 2002, as a specialist third umpire, and has also been the third umpire in a further 8 Test matches between 2000 and 2009. He also umpired 21 One-day Internationals between 1999 and 2009, and two Twenty20 Internationals, most which were played in Sri Lanka.

== See also ==
- List of Test cricket umpires
- List of One Day International cricket umpires
- List of Twenty20 International cricket umpires
