= Tyron Wijewardene =

Sri Lankan cricketer and umpire (born 1961)

Personal information
- Full name: Tyron Hirantha Wijewardene
- Born: 29 August 1961 (age 65); Maradana, Sri Lanka
- Batting: Left-handed
- Bowling: Left arm medium-fast

Umpiring information
- Tests umpired: 4 (2001–2005)
- ODIs umpired: 52 (1999–2013)
- T20Is umpired: 7 (2009–2012)
- WODIs umpired: 6 (2009–2011)
- WT20Is umpired: 2 (2010)

Career statistics
Competition	First-class
Matches	5
Runs scored	118
Batting average	23.60
100s/50s	0/1
Top score	52
Balls bowled	503
Wickets	9
Bowling average	23.33
5 wickets in innings	0
10 wickets in match	0
Best bowling	4/78
Catches/stumpings	2/–
- Source: CricketArchive, 10 August 2013

Tyron Hirantha Wijewardene (born 29 August 1961), is a Sri Lankan cricket umpire and former cricketer. He was elected to the International Panel of Umpires and Referees as Sri Lanka's second umpire.

As a cricketer, Wijewardene was a left-handed bowler, taking 9 wickets in his 5 First-class appearances for Saracens Sports Club in 1990/91. He was also a useful lower order batsman, getting one half-century having batted in just 5 innings.

Following an early retirement from cricket, he began umpiring and has stood in both Test cricket and One Day Internationals; standing in two matches during the 2003 Cricket World Cup.

== See also ==
- List of Test cricket umpires
- List of One Day International cricket umpires
- List of Twenty20 International cricket umpires
