= Asoka de Silva (cricketer) =

Sri Lankan cricketer

Asoka de Silva අශෝක ද සිල්වා
Personal information
- Full name: Ellawalakankanamge Asoka Ranjit de Silva
- Born: 28 March 1956 (age 70); Kalutara, Sri Lanka
- Batting: Left-handed
- Bowling: Right arm leg break
- Role: Umpire, Commentator

International information
- National side: Sri Lanka (1985–1992)
- Test debut (cap 29): 30 August 1985 v India
- Last Test: 1 March 1991 v New Zealand
- ODI debut (cap 52): 24 December 1986 v India
- Last ODI: 5 September 1992 v Australia

Domestic team information
- Years: Team
- 1994–1996: Galle
- 1988–1997: Nondescripts

Umpiring information
- Tests umpired: 49 (2000–2011)
- ODIs umpired: 122 (1999–2012)
- T20Is umpired: 11 (2009–2012)
- WT20Is umpired: 8 (2009–2010)

Career statistics
Competition	Test	ODI	FC	LA
Matches	10	28	84	36
Runs scored	185	138	1900	174
Batting average	15.41	9.85	21.11	10.23
100s/50s	0/1	0/0	0/8	0/0
Top score	50	19*	82*	19*
Balls bowled	2328	1374	11723	1812
Wickets	8	17	186	26
Bowling average	129.00	56.88	24.46	47.88
5 wickets in innings	0	0	7	0
10 wickets in match	0	0	0	0
Best bowling	2/67	3/38	6/48	3/38
Catches/stumpings	4/–	6/–	48/–	6/–
- Source: ESPNcricinfo, 1 April 2017

Ellawalakankanamge Asoka Ranjit de Silva (born 28 March 1956) is a Sri Lankan former cricketer and umpire who played in 10 Test matches and 28 One Day Internationals from 1985 to 1992. He was educated at Isipathana College, Colombo.

== Umpiring career ==
De Silva was the first Sri Lankan umpire to be on the Elite Panel of ICC Umpires. He served on the panel from 2002 to 2004 when he was dropped down to the International Panel, but was invited back to the Elite level in April 2008 when the panel was expanded to twelve members.

He continued as a member of the International Panel in the interim period, being used by the ICC to support the Elite Panel during busy periods in the international cricket season. He umpired in the Cricket World Cup tournaments in 2003, 2007 and 2011. De Silva was moved to less crucial matches during the 2011 Cricket World Cup after a review of his performance. He was not considered for the Elite Panel after May 2011.

== See also ==
- List of Test cricket umpires
- List of One Day International cricket umpires
- List of Twenty20 International cricket umpires
