= 1998–99 Australia Tri-Nation Series =

1998–99 Carlton and United Series
- Date: 10 January 1999 – 13 February 1999
- Location: Australia
- Result: Won by Australia; 2–0 in final series
- Player of the series: Glenn McGrath
Teams
Australia	England	Sri Lanka
Captains
Steve Waugh	Alec Stewart	Arjuna Ranatunga
Most runs
Mark Waugh (542) Adam Gilchrist (525) Darren Lehmann (396)	Graeme Hick (513); Neil Fairbrother (323); Nick Knight (315)	Romesh Kaluwitharana (308); Hashan Tillakaratne (249); Sanath Jayasuriya (223)
Most wickets
Glenn McGrath (27) Shane Warne (19) Adam Dale (13)	Darren Gough (19); Alan Mullally (14); Mark Ealham (12)	Chaminda Vaas (14); Muttiah Muralitharan (12); Sanath Jayasuriya (6)

The 1998–99 Australia Tri-Nation Series (more commonly known as the 1998–99 Carlton and United Series) was a One Day International (ODI) cricket tri-series where Australia played host to England and Sri Lanka. Australia and England reached the Finals, which Australia won 2–0.

== Squads ==
Australia	England	Sri Lanka
Steve Waugh (c); Michael Bevan; Greg Blewett; Adam Dale; Damien Fleming; Adam Gilchrist; Brendon Julian; Darren Lehmann; Glenn McGrath; Damien Martyn; Ricky Ponting; Shane Warne; Bradley Young	Alec Stewart (c); Mark Alleyne; John Crawley; Robert Croft; Mark Ealham; Neil Fairbrother; Ashley Giles; Darren Gough; Dean Headley; Graeme Hick; Adam Hollioake; Ben Hollioake; Nasser Hussain; Nick Knight; Alan Mullally; Vince Wells	Arjuna Ranatunga (c); Marvan Atapattu; Upul Chandana; Aravinda de Silva; Avishka Gunawardene; Sanath Jayasuriya; Mahela Jayawardene; Romesh Kaluwitharana; Roshan Mahanama; Muttiah Muralitharan; Ruchira Perera; Suresh Perera; Thilan Samaraweera; hashan Tillakaratne; Chaminda Vaas; Pramodya Wickramasinghe; Nuwan Zoysa

== Points table ==
Pos	Team	P	W	L	NR	T	Points	NRR
1	Australia	10	7	3	0	0	14	+0.538
2	England	10	5	5	0	0	10	+0.157
3	Sri Lanka	10	3	7	0	0	6	−0.667

== Group stage ==
=== 1st Match ===
10 January 1999 (D/N)
Scorecard

England; 178/8 (50 overs)	v	Australia; 145/9 (36 overs)
Neil Fairbrother 47 (82); Glenn McGrath 2/24 (10 overs)		Michael Bevan 56 (76); Alan Mullally 4/18 (8 overs)

England won by 7 runs (revised target)
Brisbane Cricket Ground, Brisbane
Umpires: Tony McQuillan (Aus) and Daryl Harper (Aus)
Player of the match: Alan Mullally (Eng)

- England won the toss and elected to bat.
- Australia's target reduced to 153 runs from 36 overs
- Vince Wells and Mark Alleyne (Eng) made their ODI debuts.

=== 2nd Match ===
11 January 1999 (D/N)
Scorecard

Sri Lanka; 207/7 (50 overs)	v	England; 208/6 (49.3 overs)
Romesh Kaluwitharana 58 (61); Adam Hollioake 3/32 (10 overs)		Neil Fairbrother 67 (105); Muttiah Muralitharan 3/34 (10 overs)

England won by 4 wickets
Brisbane Cricket Ground, Brisbane
Umpires: Peter Parker (Aus) and Steve Davis (Aus)
Player of the match: Neil Fairbrother (Eng)

- Sri Lanka won the toss and elected to bat.

=== 3rd Match ===
13 January 1999 (D/N)
Scorecard

Sri Lanka; 259/9 (50 overs)	v	Australia; 260/2 (46.1 overs)
Hashan Tillakaratne 73 (95); Shane Warne 2/44 (10 overs)		Adam Gilchrist 131 (118); Chaminda Vaas 1/43 (6 overs)

Australia won by 8 wickets
Sydney Cricket Ground, Sydney
Umpires: Terry Prue (Aus) and Simon Taufel (Aus)
Player of the match: Adam Gilchrist (Aus)

- Sri Lanka won the toss and elected to bat.

=== 4th Match ===
15 January 1999 (D/N)
Scorecard

England; 178 (43.2 overs)	v	Australia; 182/1 (39.2 overs)
Nasser Hussain 47 (62); Glenn McGrath 4/54 (10 overs)		Mark Waugh 83 (109); Alan Mullally 1/42 (10 overs)

Australia won by 9 wickets
Melbourne Cricket Ground, Melbourne
Umpires: Ross Emerson (Aus) and Darrell Hair (Aus)
Player of the match: Mark Waugh (Aus)

- England won the toss and elected to bat.

=== 5th Match ===
17 January 1999 (D/N)
Scorecard

England; 282/4 (50 overs)	v	Australia; 275/6 (50 overs)
Graeme Hick 108 (129); Damien Fleming 3/64 (10 overs)		Mark Waugh 85 (95); Darren Gough 2/40 (10 overs)

England won by 7 runs
Sydney Cricket Ground, Sydney
Umpires: Darrell Hair (Aus) and Simon Taufel (Aus)
Player of the match: Graeme Hick (Eng)

- England won the toss and elected to bat.

=== 6th Match ===
19 January 1999 (D/N)
Scorecard

Sri Lanka; 186 (50 overs)	v	England; 189/3 (45.2 overs)
Arjuna Ranatunga 76 (105); Darren Gough 4/28 (10 overs)		Graeme Hick 66 (101); Nuwan Zoysa 2/22 (6 overs)

England won by 7 wickets
Melbourne Cricket Ground, Melbourne
Umpires: Darrell Harper (Aus) and Terry Prue (Aus)
Player of the match: Darren Gough (Eng)

- Sri Lanka won the toss and elected to bat.

=== 7th Match ===
21 January 1999
Scorecard

Australia; 210/9 (50 overs)	v	Sri Lanka; 211/7 (49.3 overs)
Mark Waugh 65 (105); Chaminda Vaas 3/27 (10 overs)		Marvan Atapattu 82 (121); Shane Warne 3/45 (10 overs)

Sri Lanka won by 3 wickets
Bellerive Oval, Hobart
Umpires: Peter Parker (Aus) and Steve Davis (Aus)
Player of the match: Marvan Atapattu (SL)

- Sri Lanka won the toss and elected to field.

=== 8th Match ===
23 January 1999
14:00 UTC+10:30 (D/N)
Scorecard

England; 3/302 (50 overs)	v	Sri Lanka; 9/303 (49.4 overs)
Graeme Hick 126 (118); Sanath Jayasuriya 1/42 (10 overs)		Mahela Jayawardene 120 (111); Vince Wells 2/30 (4.4 overs)

Sri Lanka won by 1 wicket
Adelaide Oval, Adelaide
Umpires: Ross Emerson (Aus) and Tony McQuillan (Aus)
Player of the match: Mahela Jayawardene (SL)

- Sri Lanka won the toss and elected to field.
- Mahela Jayawardene (SL) scored his first century in ODIs.
- This was the highest successful run chase in an ODI match at the Adelaide Oval.
- This match was also notable for a controversy over Muttiah Muralitharan's bowling.

=== 9th Match ===
24 January 1999 (D/N)
Scorecard

Australia; 270 (50 overs)	v	Sri Lanka; 190 (41.4 overs)
Mark Waugh 57 (68); Chaminda Vaas 3/63 (10 overs)		Roshan Mahanama 55 (82); Glenn McGrath 5/40 (10 overs)

Australia won by 80 runs
Adelaide Oval, Adelaide
Umpires: Steve Davis (Aus) and Simon Taufel (Aus)
Player of the match: Glenn McGrath (Aus)

- Sri Lanka won the toss and elected to field.

=== 10th Match ===
26 January 1999 (D/N)
Scorecard

Australia; 239/8 (50 overs)	v	England; 223 (48.3 overs)
Mark Waugh 65 (80); Robert Croft 2/40 (10 overs)		Graeme Hick 109 (119); Glenn McGrath 3/40 (9.3 overs)

Australia won by 16 runs
Adelaide Oval, Adelaide
Umpires: Peter Parker (Aus) and Daryl Harper (Aus)
Player of the match: Graeme Hick (Eng)

- Australia won the toss and elected to bat.

=== 11th Match ===
29 January 1999 (D/N)
Scorecard

England; 227/7 (50 overs)	v	Sri Lanka; 99 (33.3 overs)
Neil Fairbrother 81 (119); Ruchira Perera 3/55 (10 overs)		Sanath Jayasuriya 40 (58); Mark Ealham 5/32 (10 overs)

England won by 128 runs
WACA Ground, Perth
Umpires: Peter Parker (Aus) and Steve Davis (Aus)
Player of the match: Mark Ealham (Eng)

- Sri Lanka won the toss and elected to field.

=== 12th Match ===
31 January 1999
Scorecard

Australia; 274/7 (50 overs)	v	Sri Lanka; 229 (46.3 overs)
Michael Bevan 72 (65); Pramodya Wickramasinghe 3/48 (10 overs)		Sanath Jayasuriya 50 (49); Shane Warne 3/53 (10 overs)

Australia won by 45 runs
WACA Ground, Perth
Umpires: Daryl Harper (Aus) and Terry Prue (Aus)
Player of the match: Ricky Ponting (Aus)

- Sri Lanka won the toss and elected to field.

=== 13th Match ===
3 February 1999 (D/N)
Scorecard

Sri Lanka; 181/7 (44 overs)	v	England; 170/9 (44 overs)
Romesh Kaluwitharana 54 (87); Mark Alleyne 3/27 (9 overs)		Nick Knight 58 (109); Thilan Samaraweera 3/34 (9 overs)

Sri Lanka won by 11 runs
Sydney Cricket Ground, Sydney
Umpires: Tony McQuillan (Aus) and Simon Taufel (Aus)
Player of the match: Thilan Samaraweera (SL)

- England won the toss and elected to field.
- Match reduced to 44 overs each

=== 14th Match ===
5 February 1999 (D/N)
Scorecard

England; 210/8 (50 overs)	v	Australia; 211/6 (47 overs)
Vince Wells 39 (63); Adam Dale 2/28 (10 overs)		Ricky Ponting 43 (71); Alan Mullally 2/31 (10 overs)

Australia won by 4 wickets
Sydney Cricket Ground, Sydney
Umpires: Peter Parker (Aus) and Darrell Hair (Aus)
Player of the match: Damien Martyn (Aus)

- England won the toss and elected to bat.

=== 15th Match ===
7 February 1999
Scorecard

Australia; 310/8 (50 overs)	v	Sri Lanka; 267 (47.1 overs)
Adam Gilchrist 154 (129); Muttiah Muralitharan 2/15 (3.4 overs)		Avishka Gunawardene 75 (66); Shane Lee 5/33 (8.1 overs)

Australia won by 43 runs
Melbourne Cricket Ground, Melbourne
Umpires: Darrell Hair (Aus) and Terry Prue (Aus)
Player of the match: Adam Gilchrist (Aus)

- Australia won the toss and elected to bat.

== Final series ==
Australia won the best of three final series against England 2–0.

=== 1st Final ===
10 February 1999
Scorecard

Australia; 232/8 (50 overs)	v	England; 222 (49.2 overs)
Michael Bevan 69 (74); Vince Wells 3/30 (10 overs)		Nasser Hussain 58 (98); Glenn McGrath 4/45 (9.2 overs)

Australia won by 10 runs
Sydney Cricket Ground, Sydney
Umpires: Darrell Hair (Aus) and Steve Davis (Aus)
Player of the match: Michael Bevan (Aus)

- Australia won the toss and elected to bat.

=== 2nd Final ===
13 February 1999
Scorecard

Australia; 272/5 (50 overs)	v	England; 110 (31.5 overs)
Darren Lehmann 71 (75); Vince Wells 1/34 (5 overs)		Alec Stewart 32 (36); Shane Warne 3/16 (5.5 overs)

Australia won by 162 runs
Melbourne Cricket Ground, Melbourne
Umpires: Darrell Hair (Aus) and Daryl Harper (Aus)
Player of the match: Darren Lehmann (Aus)

- Australia won the toss and elected to bat.
