= 1995–96 Australian Tri-Series =

International cricket tournament

1995–96 World Series
- Date: 9 December 1995 – 25 January 1996
- Location: Australia
- Result: Won by Australia; 2–0 (defeating Sri Lanka Sri Lanka) in final series
Teams
Australia	Sri Lanka	West Indies
Captains
Mark Taylor	Arjuna Ranatunga	Richie Richardson
Most runs
Most wickets

The 1995–96 World Series was a One Day International (ODI) cricket tri-series where Australia played host to Sri Lanka and West Indies. Australia and Sri Lanka reached the Finals, which Australia won 2–0. Sri Lanka and West Indies contested the tri-series for the first time since the 1984-85 season.

== Uniforms ==
Australia
Australia kit

Sri Lanka
Sri Lanka kit

West Indies
West Indies kit

== Squads ==
Australia	Sri Lanka	West Indies
Mark Taylor (c); Michael Bevan; Ian Healy; Michael Kasprowicz; Stuart Law; Shane Lee; Craig McDermott; Glenn McGrath; Ricky Ponting; Paul Reiffel; Michael Slater; Shane Warne; Mark Waugh; Steve Waugh	Arjuna Ranatunga (c); Aravinda de Silva; Kumar Dharmasena; Chamara Dunusinghe; Asanka Gurusinha; Chandika Hathurusingha; Sanath Jayasuriya; Romesh Kaluwitharana; Roshan Mahanama; Manjula Munasinghe; Muttiah Muralitharan; Ravindra Pushpakumara; Sanjeeva Ranatunga; Jayantha Silva; Hashan Tillakaratne; Eric Upashantha; Chaminda Vaas; Pramodya Wickremasinghe	Richie Richardson (c); Jimmy Adams; Curtly Ambrose; Ian Bishop; Courtney Browne; Sherwin Campbell; Shivnarine Chanderpaul; Anderson Cummins; Ottis Gibson; Roger Harper; Roland Holder; Carl Hooper; Phil Simmons; Courtney Walsh; Stuart Williams

== Points table ==
Pos	Team	P	W	L	NR	T	Points	NRR
1	Australia	8	5	3	0	0	10	+0.368
2	Sri Lanka	8	4	4	0	0	8	-0.282
3	West Indies	8	3	5	0	0	6	-0.439

== Result summary ==
15 December 1995
Scorecard

West Indies; 160/8 (50 overs)	v	Sri Lanka; 161/6 (45 overs)
SL Campbell 47 (102); A Ranatunga 2/24 (10 overs)		PA de Silva 46 (60); IR Bishop 3/38 (10 overs)

Sri Lanka won by 4 wickets
Adelaide Oval, Adelaide
Umpires: DJ Harper and TA Prue
Player of the match: A Ranatunga (SL)

- Sri Lanka won the toss and elected to field

17 December 1995
Scorecard

Australia; 242/6 (47 overs)	v	West Indies; 121/6 (47 overs)
ME Waugh 53 (65); RA Harper 4/46 (10 overs)		S Chanderpaul 39 (83); CJ McDermott 2/8 (7 overs)

Australia won by 121 runs
Adelaide Oval, Adelaide
Umpires: AJ McQuillan and TA Prue
Player of the match: ME Waugh (AUS)

- West Indies won the toss and elected to field
- The match was reduced before play started to 47 overs per side
- S Lee (AUS) made his ODI debut

19 December 1995 (D/N)
Scorecard

Australia; 249/6 (50 overs)	v	West Indies; 225 (49.1 overs)
SG Law 74 (86); CEL Ambrose 2/36 (10 overs)		S Chanderpaul 73 (116); MG Bevan 2/31 (8 overs)

Australia won by 24 runs
Melbourne Cricket Ground, Melbourne
Umpires: PD Parker and SG Randell
Player of the match: MG Bevan (AUS)

- Australia won the toss and elected to bat
- MS Kasprowicz (AUS) made his ODI debut

21 December 1995 (D/N)
Scorecard

Sri Lanka; 255/9 (50 overs)	v	Australia; 257/5 (49.4 overs)
PA de Silva 75 (94); GD McGrath 2/47 (10 overs)		MA Taylor 90 (115); HDPK Dharmasena 1/41 (8.4 overs)

Australia won by 5 wickets
Sydney Cricket Ground, Sydney
Umpires: DB Hair and DJ Harper
Player of the match: MA Taylor (AUS)

- Sri Lanka won the toss and elected to bat

1 January 1996 (D/N)
Scorecard

West Indies; 172/9 (43 overs)	v	Australia; 173/9 (43 overs)
CL Hooper 93* (96); PR Reiffel 4/29 (9 overs)		MG Bevan 78* (88); CEL Ambrose 3/20 (9 overs)

Australia won by 1 wicket
Sydney Cricket Ground, Sydney
Umpires: PD Parker and TA Prue
Player of the match: PR Reiffel (AUS)

- West Indies won the toss and elected to bat
- The match was reduced to 43 overs per side

3 January 1996
Scorecard

West Indies; 194 (48.2 overs)	v	Sri Lanka; 124 (37.4 overs)
S Chanderpaul 77 (117); WPUJC Vaas 3/21 (9 overs)		AP Gurusinha 48 (83); OD Gibson 5/42 (8.4 overs)

West Indies won by 70 runs
Bellerive Oval, Hobart
Umpires: SJ Davis and TA Prue
Player of the match: S Chanderpaul (WI)

- Sri Lanka won the toss and elected to field

5 January 1996 (D/N)
Scorecard

Sri Lanka; 102 (45.2 overs)	v	West Indies; 104/3 (26.1 overs)
HP Tillakaratne 37 (116); CEL Ambrose 3/20 (10 overs)		SL Campbell 34 (39); WPUJC Vaas 2/24 (10 overs)

West Indies won by 7 wickets
Brisbane Cricket Ground, Woolloongabba, Brisbane
Umpires: RA Emerson and AJ McQuillan
Player of the match: CEL Ambrose (WI)

- Sri Lanka won the toss and elected to bat
- The first ever Day/Night ODI in Brisbane

7 January 1996
Scorecard

West Indies; 231 (49.3 overs)	v	Australia; 217 (47.4 overs)
RB Richardson 81 (111); GD McGrath 3/47 (9.3 overs)		SG Law 62 (99); OD Gibson 2/38 (5.4 overs)

West Indies won by 14 runs
Brisbane Cricket Ground, Woolloongabba, Brisbane
Umpires: DB Hair and PD Parker
Player of the match: OD Gibson (WI)

- Australia won the toss and elected to field

9 January 1996 (D/N)
Scorecard

Australia; 213/5 (50 overs)	v	Sri Lanka; 214/7 (47.3 overs)
RT Ponting 123* (138); AMN Munasinghe 3/30 (10 overs)		RS Kaluwitharana 77 (75); CJ McDermott 2/42 (10 overs)

Sri Lanka won by 3 wickets
Melbourne Cricket Ground, Melbourne
Umpires: DJ Harper and AJ McQuillan
Player of the match: RS Kaluwitharana (SL)

- Australia won the toss and elected to bat

12 January 1996 (D/N)
Scorecard

Australia; 266/6 (50 overs)	v	Sri Lanka; 183/9 (50 overs)
ME Waugh 130 (144); WPUJC Vaas 2/33 (10 overs)		HP Tillakaratne 58* (103); SG Law 2/30 (10 overs)

Australia won by 83 runs
WACA Ground, Perth
Umpires: DB Hair and PD Parker
Player of the match: ME Waugh (AUS)

- Australia won the toss and elected to bat

14 January 1996
Scorecard

Sri Lanka; 202 (50 overs)	v	West Indies; 186/9 (50 overs)
RS Kaluwitharana 50 (54); RS Mahanama 50 (82); OD Gibson 5/40 (10 overs)		S Chanderpaul 44 (89); PA de Silva 3/43 (10 overs)

Sri Lanka won by 16 runs
WACA Ground, Perth
Umpires: DJ Harper and TA Prue
Player of the match: RS Kaluwitharana (SL)

- West Indies won the toss and elected to field

16 January 1996 (D/N)
Scorecard

Australia; 242/4 (50 overs)	v	Sri Lanka; 246/7 (49.4 overs)
SR Waugh 102* (115); GP Wickramasinghe 2/33 (8 overs)		RS Kaluwitharana 74 (68); SK Warne 3/40 (10 overs)

Sri Lanka won by 3 wickets
Melbourne Cricket Ground, Melbourne
Umpires: DB Hair and SG Randell
Player of the match: RS Kaluwitharana (SL)

- Australia won the toss and elected to bat

== Final series ==
Australia won the best of three final series against Sri Lanka 2–0.

18 January 1996 (D/N)
Scorecard

Australia; 201/7 (50 overs)	v	Sri Lanka; 183 (48.1 overs)
MG Bevan 59 (101); WPUJC Vaas 3/426 (10 overs)		AP Gurusinha 47 (82); GD McGrath 3/28 (9.1 overs)

Australia won by 18 runs
Melbourne Cricket Ground, Melbourne
Umpires: DB Hair and SG Randell

- Sri Lanka won the toss and elected to field

20 January 1996 (D/N)
Scorecard

Australia; 273/5 (50 overs)	v	Sri Lanka; 159/8 (25 overs)
MA Taylor 82 (95); HDPK Dharmasena 2/45 (10 overs)		A Ranatunga 41 (43); SK Warne 3/20 (5 overs)

Australia won by 8 runs (adjusted highest scoring overs)
Sydney Cricket Ground, Sydney
Umpires: PD Parker and SG Randell

- Sri Lanka won the toss and elected to field
- Sri Lanka target was 168 runs in 25 overs
