= 1994–95 Australian Tri-Series =

International cricket tournament

1994–95 World Series
- Dates: 2 December 1994 – 12 January 1995
- Cricket format: One Day International (Note: Excluding matches involving Australia A)
- Tournament format(s): Round-robin
- Host(s): Australia
- Champions: Australia
- Runners-up: Australia A
- Participants: 4
- Matches: 14
- Most runs: (Australia) David Boon (384)
- Most wickets: (Australia) Glenn McGrath (18)

The 1994–95 World Series was a One Day International (ODI) cricket quadrangular where Australia played host to England and Zimbabwe. A development team Australia A also took part in the tournament. Australia and Australia A reached the finals, which Australia won 2–0.
The matches involving Australia A were not classified as official One Day Internationals.

== Background ==
Initially the tournament was only consisted of a tri-nation series with the schedule being revealed on 21 October 1993 with the three teams playing each other four times which started on 2 December with England taking on Zimbabwe and ending on 12 January before a three match final series which would go from the 15 to 19 January.

== Uniforms ==
Australia
Australia Kit

Australia A
Australia A Kit

England
England Kit

Zimbabwe
Zimbabwe Kit

== Squads ==
Australia	Australia A	England	Zimbabwe
Mark Taylor (c); Michael Bevan*; David Boon; Phil Emery*; Damien Fleming; Ian Healy; Stuart Law; Tim May; Craig McDermott; Gavin Robertson*; Michael Slater; Shane Warne; Mark Waugh; Steve Waugh; Paul Reiffel*; Glenn McGrath	Damien Martyn (c); Michael Bevan*; Jo Angel; Phil Emery*; Matthew Hayden; Merv Hughes; Shane George; Justin Langer; Darren Lehmann; Gavin Robertson*; Peter McIntyre; Mark N. Atkinson; Tom Moody; Ricky Ponting; Paul Reiffel*; Greg Rowell	Michael Atherton (c); Joey Benjamin; John Crawley; Phillip DeFreitas; Mike Gatting; Graham Gooch; Darren Gough; Graeme Hick; Devon Malcolm; Martin McCague; Steve Rhodes; Alec Stewart; Graham Thorpe; Phil Tufnell; Shaun Udal; Craig White	Andy Flower (c); David Brain; Eddo Brandes; Alistair Campbell; Mark Dekker; Grant Flower; David Houghton; Wayne James; Gary Martin; Stephen Peall; Daniel Rowett; Paul Strang; Heath Streak; Guy Whittall

- = Played for Australia and for Australia A during the tournament

== Points table ==
Pos	Team	Pld	W	L	T	NR	Pts	NRR
1	Australia	6	5	1	0	0	10	0.425
2	Australia A	6	3	3	0	0	6	0.093
3	England	6	3	3	0	0	6	0.080
4	Zimbabwe	6	1	5	0	0	2	−0.595

== Result summary ==
ICC ruled beforehand that matches involving Australia A should not be regarded as official internationals.

2 December 1994 (D/N)
Scorecard

Zimbabwe; 166/9 (50 overs)	v	Australia; 167/8 (47.2 overs)
A Flower 29 (32); GD McGrath 2/23 (10 overs)		MA Taylor 45 (45); GW Flower 3/15 (4 overs)

Australia won by 2 wickets
WACA Ground, Perth
Umpires: TA Prue and WP Sheahan
Player of the match: SK Warne (AUS)

- Australia won the toss and elected to field
- SG Law (AUS) and PA Strang (ZIM) made their ODI debuts

4 December 1994
Scorecard

Zimbabwe; 166/9 (50 overs)	v	Australia A 167/5 (35.1 overs)
A Flower 44 (56); TM Moody 3/16 (10 overs)		DS Lehmann 85 (87); PA Strang 2/32 (8 overs)

Australia A won by 5 wickets
WACA Ground, Perth
Umpires: SJ Davis and TA Prue
Player of the match: TM Moody (AUS A)

- Zimbabwe won the toss and elected to bat

6 December 1994 (D/N)
Scorecard

Australia; 224/4 (50 overs)	v	England; 196 (48.3 overs)
DC Boon 64* (65); SD Udal 2/37 (10 overs)		MA Atherton 60 (103); CJ McDermott 3/34 (9.3 overs)

Australia won by 28 runs
Sydney Cricket Ground, Sydney
Umpires: DB Hair and PD Parker
Player of the match: DC Boon (AUS)

- Australia won the toss and elected to bat
- JE Benjamin and C White (both ENG) made their ODI debuts

8 December 1994
Scorecard

Australia; 254/3 (50 overs)	v	Zimbabwe; 170/8 (50 overs)
SG Law 110 (135); GJ Whittall 1/22 (7 overs)		A Flower 39 (56); GD McGrath 2/18 (8 overs)

Australia won by 84 runs
Bellerive Oval, Hobart
Umpires: AJ McQuillan and SG Randell
Player of the match: SG Law (AUS)

- Australia won the toss and elected to bat

10 December 1994
Scorecard

Zimbabwe; 201/8 (50 overs)	v	Australia A 202/3 (48.5 overs)
GJ Whittall 59* (80); MG Hughes 2/22 (9 overs)		ML Hayden 101* (162); HH Streak 2/17 (9 overs)

Australia A won by 7 wickets
Adelaide Oval, Adelaide
Umpires: WP Sheahan and CD Timmins
Player of the match: ML Hayden (AUS A)

- Zimbabwe won the toss and elected to bat

11 December 1994
Scorecard

Australia; 202 (48.3 overs)	v	Australia A 196 (47.4 overs)
MJ Slater 64 (87); MG Hughes 3/33 (9 overs)		ML Hayden 45 (94); GD McGrath 4/43 (9.4 overs)

Australia won by 6 runs
Adelaide Oval, Adelaide
Umpires: SJ Davis and PD Parker
Player of the match: GD McGrath (AUS)

- Australia won the toss and elected to bat

13 December 1994 (D/N)
Scorecard

England; 188/9 (50 overs)	v	Australia A 157 (45.5 overs)
C White 43 (65); MG Hughes 2/22 (10 overs)		JL Langer 55 (110); C White 3/35 (8.5 overs)

England won by 31 runs
Melbourne Cricket Ground, Melbourne
Umpires: AJ McQuillan and SG Randell
Player of the match: C White (ENG)

- England won the toss and elected to bat

15 December 1994 (D/N)
Scorecard

Zimbabwe; 205 (49.3 overs)	v	England; 192 (49.1 overs)
GW Flower 84* (143); D Gough 5/44 (9.3 overs)		GA Hick 64 (88); PA Strang 2/30 (10 overs)

Zimbabwe won by 13 runs
Sydney Cricket Ground, Sydney
Umpires: DB Hair and CD Timmins
Player of the match: GW Flower (ZIM)

- Zimbabwe won the toss and elected to bat
- JP Crawley (ENG) made his ODI debut

7 January 1995
Scorecard

England; 200/8 (50 overs)	v	Zimbabwe; 174 (48.1 overs)
GP Thorpe 89 (119); MH Dekker 2/30 (7 overs)		GJ Whittall 53 (74); D Gough 2/17 (9.1 overs)

England won by 26 runs
Brisbane Cricket Ground, Woolloongabba, Brisbane
Umpires: AJ McQuillan and CD Timmins
Player of the match: GP Thorpe (ENG)

- England won the toss and elected to bat

8 January 1995
Scorecard

Australia; 252/5 (50 overs)	v	Australia A 218 (47.5 overs)
ME Waugh 93 (102); PR Reiffel 2/46 (10 overs)		GS Blewett 63 (75); SG Law 3/46 (9 overs)

Australia won by 34 runs
Brisbane Cricket Ground, Woolloongabba, Brisbane
Umpires: PD Parker and SG Randell
Player of the match: ME Waugh (AUS)

- Australia won the toss and elected to bat

10 January 1995 (D/N)
Scorecard

England; 225/8 (50 overs)	v	Australia; 188 (48 overs)
GA Hick 91 (120); GD McGrath 4/25 (10 overs)		IA Healy 56 (63); AR Fraser 4/22 (10 overs)

England won by 37 runs
Melbourne Cricket Ground, Melbourne
Umpires: PD Parker and SG Randell
Player of the match: GA Hick (ENG)

- England won the toss and elected to bat

12 January 1995 (D/N)
Scorecard

Australia A 264/5 (50 overs)	v	England; 235/9 (50 overs)
GS Blewett 113 (133); CC Lewis 2/48 (6 overs)		JP Crawley 37 (47); PE McIntyre 3/45 (10 overs)

Australia A won by 29 runs
Sydney Cricket Ground, Sydney
Umpires: DB Hair and TA Prue
Player of the match: GS Blewett (AUS A)

- Australia A won the toss and elected to bat
- England required 237 to qualify for the finals on net run rate.

== Final series ==
Australia won the best of three final series against Australia A 2–0.

15 January 1995 (D/N)
Scorecard

Australia A 209/8 (50 overs)	v	Australia; 213/5 (50 overs)
MG Bevan 73 (86); CG McDermott 4/25 (10 overs)		MJ Slater 92 (146); GS Blewett 2/25 (10 overs)

Australia won by 5 wickets
Sydney Cricket Ground, Sydney
Umpires: PD Parker and TA Prue

- Australia A won the toss and elected to bat

17 January 1995 (D/N)
Scorecard

Australia A 226 (49.4 overs)	v	Australia; 229/4 (49 overs)
GS Blewett 64 (91); DW Fleming 4/28 (9.4 overs)		MJ Slater 56 (84); SR Waugh 56* (64); GS Blewett 2/44 (10 overs)

Australia won by 6 wickets
Melbourne Cricket Ground, Melbourne
Umpires: DB Hair and SG Randell

- Australia A won the toss and elected to bat
