= Sri Lankan cricket team in Zimbabwe in 1999–2000 =

	Zimbabwe	Sri Lanka
- Dates: 7 November 1999 – 7 December 1999
Captains	Andy Flower	Sanath Jayasuriya

Test series
- Result: Sri Lanka won the 3-match series 1–0
Most runs	Andy Flower (388)	Marvan Atapattu (265)
Most wickets	Chaminda Vaas (14)	Henry Olonga (9)
- Player of the series: Andy Flower

One Day International series
- Results: Sri Lanka won the 5-match series 3–1
Most runs	Alistair Campbell (195)	Russel Arnold (277)
Most wickets	Guy Whittall (10)	Upul Chandana (7)

The Sri Lanka national cricket team toured Zimbabwe in November and December 1999 to play 3 Test matches and 5 ODIs.

== Squads ==
Tests		ODIs	
Zimbabwe	Sri Lanka	Zimbabwe	Sri Lanka
Andy Flower (wk) (c)	Sanath Jayasuriya (c)	Andy Flower (wk) (c)	Sanath Jayasuriya (c)
Grant Flower	Marvan Atapattu	Alistair Campbell	Romesh Kaluwitharana (wk)
Gavin Rennie	Russel Arnold	Grant Flower	Marvan Atapattu
Murray Goodwin	Mahela Jayawardene	Trevor Madondo	Mahela Jayawardene
Neil Johnson	Tillakaratne Dilshan	Murray Goodwin	Russel Arnold
Alistair Campbell	Romesh Kaluwitharana (wk)	Gavin Rennie	Tillakaratne Dilshan
Guy Whittall	Indika de Saram	Guy Whittall	Upul Chandana
Gary Brent	Chaminda Vaas	Gary Brent	Chaminda Vaas
Bryan Strang	Indika Gallage	Andy Whittall	Muttiah Muralitharan
Andy Whittall	Pramodya Wickramasinghe	Henry Olonga	Pramodya Wickramasinghe
Henry Olonga	Muttiah Muralitharan	Pommie Mbangwa	Sajeewa de Silva
Trevor Gripper	Nuwan Zoysa	John Rennie	Ravindra Pushpakumara
Everton Matambanadzo	Ravindra Pushpakumara	Stuart Carlisle	Indika de Saram
Craig Wishart		Eddo Brandes	Indika Gallage
Ray Price		Bryan Strang	
Eddo Brandes			

== Tour matches ==
=== Zimbabwe Cricket Union President's XI v Sri Lankans ===
7,8,9 November 1999
Scorecard

Zimbabwe Cricket Union President's XI	v	Sri Lankans
325 (89.3 overs); Gavin Rennie 127; Indika Gallage 6/60 (17 overs)		438 (127.1 overs); Russel Arnold 75; Andy Whittall 6/151 (43 overs)

Match drawn
Bulawayo Athletic Club, Bulawayo
Umpires: Charles Coventry (ZIM) & Jeff Fenwick (ZIM)

- Zimbabwe Cricket Union President's XI, who chose to bat

=== Zimbabwe Cricket Academy v Sri Lankans ===
12,13 November 1999
Scorecard

Sri Lankans	v	Zimbabwe Cricket Academy
302 (101.3 overs); Mahela Jayawardene 50; Gary Brent 6/84 (30.3 overs)		126 (48.5 overs); Greg Lamb 29; Muttiah Muralitharan 4/24 (10.5 overs)
		44(f/o) (27.2 overs); David Mutendera 13; Muttiah Muralitharan 2.5 (5.2 overs)

Sri Lankans won by an innings and 132 runs
Kwekwe Sports Club, Kwekwe
Umpires: Ronald Strang (ZIM) & Justice Tapfumaneyi (ZIM)

- Sri Lankans, who chose to bat

== Test series ==
=== 1st Test ===
18–22 November 1999
Scorecard

Zimbabwe	v	Sri Lanka
286 (96.2 overs); Andy Flower 86 (200); Pramodya Wickramasinghe 6/60 (21.2 overs)		428 (147 overs); Marvan Atapattu 216* (437); Henry Olonga 4/103 (32 overs)
136/3 (49 overs); Neil Johnson 52 (106); Chaminda Vaas 2/27 (13 overs)

Match drawn
Queens Sports Club, Bulawayo
Umpires: Kevan Barbour (ZIM) & Eddie Nicholls (WIN)
Player of the match: Marvan Atapattu

- Sri Lanka, who chose to field
- There was no play on the fifth day.
- Indika de Saram, Tillakaratne Dilshan and Indika Gallage (Sri Lanka); Gary Brent (Zimbabwe) made their Test debuts.

=== 2nd Test ===
26–30 November 1999
Scorecard

Zimbabwe	v	Sri Lanka
174 (95.5 overs); Andy Flower 74 (227); Nuwan Zoysa 3/22 (13 overs)		432 (149.3 overs); Tillakaratne Dilshan 163 (343); Bryan Strang 2/70 (37 overs)
292 (134.4 overs); Andy Flower 129 (304); Sanath Jayasuriya 4/40 (12.4 overs)		38/4 (15.2 overs); Romesh Kaluwitharana 14 (20); Gary Brent 3/21 (7.2 overs)

Sri Lanka won by 6 wickets
Harare Sports Club, Harare
Umpires: Steve Bucknor (WI) and Russell Tiffin (Zim)
Player of the match: Tillakaratne Dilshan (SL)

- Sri Lanka, who chose to field
- Nuwan Zoysa (SL) became the first bowler to take a hat-trick in their first three balls of a Test.

=== 3rd Test ===
4–8 December 1999
Scorecard

Zimbabwe	v	Sri Lanka
218 (98.4 overs); Neil Johnson 70 (149); Ravindra Pushpakumara 5/56 (25 overs)		231 (88.4 overs); Russel Arnold 104 (243); Eddo Brandes 3/45 (17 overs)
197/7 (109 overs); Andy Flower 70 (257); Chaminda Vaas 3/48 (22 overs)		36/1 (9 overs); Sanath Jayasuriya 16 (33); Eddo Brandes 1/20 (4 overs)

Match drawn
Harare Sports Club, Harare
Umpires: Ian Robinson (ZIM) & Srinivas Venkataraghavan (IND)
Player of the match: Russel Arnold & Andy Flower

- Sri Lanka, who chose to field
- There was no play on the fourth day.
- Ray Price (Zim) played his first Test

== ODI series ==
=== 1st ODI ===
11 December 1999
Scorecard

Sri Lanka; 284/9 (50 overs)	v	Zimbabwe; 65/1 (14.5 overs)
Russel Arnold 56 (53); Gary Brent 4/53 (10 overs)		Grant Flower 30 (44); Sajeewa de Silva 1/28 (7 overs)

No result
Queens Sports Club, Bulawayo
Umpires: Graeme Evans (ZIM) & Russell Tiffin (ZIM)
Player of the match: Tillakaratne Dilshan

- Rain interrupted after 14.5 overs in Zimbabwe innings. After several inspections the Umpires abandoned the match.
- Zimbabwe, who chose to field

=== 2nd ODI ===
12 December 1999
Scorecard

Sri Lanka; 213 (50 overs)	v	Zimbabwe; 200 (49.1 overs)
Russel Arnold 103 (121); Guy Whittall 4/34 (10 overs)		Alistair Campbell 56 (104); Sanath Jayasuriya 4/41 (10 overs)

Sri Lanka won by 13 runs
Queens Sports Club, Bulawayo
Umpires: Ian Robinson (ZIM) & Russell Tiffin (ZIM)
Player of the match: Russel Arnold

- Zimbabwe, who chose to field

=== 3rd ODI ===
15 December 1999
Scorecard

Sri Lanka; 248/7 (50 overs)	v	Zimbabwe; 150 (37 overs)
Marvan Atapattu 69 (107); Henry Olonga 4/51 (10 overs)		Grant Flower 47 (59); Muttiah Muralitharan 4/16 (7 overs)

Sri Lanka won by 98 runs
Harare Sports Club, Harare
Umpires: Graeme Evans (ZIM) & Ian Robinson (ZIM)
Player of the match: Upul Chandana

- Zimbabwe, who chose to field

=== 4th ODI ===
18 December 1999
Scorecard

Zimbabwe; 260/4 (50 overs)	v	Sri Lanka; 262/4 (44.4 overs)
Stuart Carlisle 121 (138); Chaminda Vaas 1/44 (10 overs)		Romesh Kaluwitharana 99 (86); John Rennie 2/36 (8 overs)

Sri Lanka won by 6 wickets
Harare Sports Club, Harare
Umpires: Ahmed Esat (ZIM) & Russell Tiffin (ZIM)
Player of the match: Stuart Carlisle

- Zimbabwe, who chose to bat

=== 5th ODI ===
19 December 1999
Scorecard

Sri Lanka; 202 (48.2 overs)	v	Zimbabwe; 206/4 (46.2 overs)
Tillakaratne Dilshan 53 (73); Guy Whittall 3/37 (8 overs)		Grant Flower 52 (71); Upul Chandana 1/33 (10 overs)

Zimbabwe won by 6 wickets
Harare Sports Club, Harare
Umpires: Kevan Barbour (ZIM) & Ian Robinson (ZIM)
Player of the match: Guy Whittall

- Sri Lanka, who chose to bat
- Indika Gallage made his ODI debut.
