= 1996 Singer World Series =

International cricket tournament

The Singer World Series was a quadrangular ODI cricket tournament held in Sri Lanka from 26 August to 7 September 1996. It featured the national cricket teams of Zimbabwe, Australia, India and the hosts, Sri Lanka. The competition was won by Sri Lanka, which defeated Australia in the final.

== Background ==
The Singer World Series was the first senior cricket tournament to be held in Sri Lanka after the 1996 Cricket World Cup. Security threats due to the Sri Lankan Civil War and potential terrorist attacks from the LTTE had led Australia to refuse to visit Sri Lanka for their scheduled match in the island nation. This time, Australia agreed to participate amidst intensive security arrangements. Following their 1996 World Cup triumph, Sri Lanka had emerged as clear favourites. The Australian team was considered the most serious challenger to their prospects. Zimbabwe's struggling, lacklustre performances did not make them serious contenders. The Indian team had come off a string of successive ODI tournament defeats and a poor showing in their tour of England, which led to the replacement of the team captain Mohammad Azharuddin with his deputy, Sachin Tendulkar. The Singer World Series was to be Tendulkar's first ODI tournament leading the national team.

== Squads ==
Sri Lanka	Australia	India	Zimbabwe
Arjuna Ranatunga (c); Aravinda de Silva; Marvan Atapattu; Upul Chandana; Kumar Dharmasena; Asanka Gurusinha; Sanath Jayasuriya; Romesh Kaluwitharana (wk); Roshan Mahanama; Muttiah Muralitharan; Ravindra Pushpakumara; Hashan Tillakaratne; Chaminda Vaas; Pramodya Wickremasinghe	Ian Healy (c) (wk); Michael Bevan; Damien Fleming; Jason Gillespie; Brad Hogg; Stuart Law; Darren Lehmann; Steve Waugh; Glenn McGrath; Ricky Ponting; Paul Reiffel; Michael Slater; Mark Waugh	Sachin Tendulkar (c); Anil Kumble; Mohammad Azharuddin; Javagal Srinath; Rahul Dravid; Venkatesh Prasad; Sourav Ganguly; Sunil Joshi; David Johnson; Vinod Kambli; Aashish Kapoor; Nayan Mongia (wk); Ajay Jadeja; Vikram Rathour	Alistair Campbell (c); Eddo Brandes; Grant Flower; Mark Dekker; Craig Evans; Andy Flower (wk); Charlie Lock; Wayne James; Mpumelelo Mbangwa; Henry Olonga; Ali Shah; Bryan Strang; Paul Strang; Heath Streak; Guy Whittall; Craig Wishart

All three visiting sides had new captains, while Sri Lanka largely retained the team that had won the World Cup under veteran Arjuna Ranatunga's captaincy. Their 14-player squad was largely unchanged from the one that had claimed the World Cup. India had named a 14-player squad under the leadership of Sachin Tendulkar. It featured two debutants: fast-bowler David Johnson and off-spin bowler Sunil Joshi. The squad was being coached by retired Indian pace bowler Madan Lal. Owing to Mark Taylor's back injury, wicket-keeper Ian Healy took over as captain of Australia's 13-player squad for the series, which included the debutants fast-bowler Jason Gillespie, spin bowler Brad Hogg and batsman Darren Lehmann. Zimbabwe's 16-player squad was led by their new captain, Alistair Campbell, who had succeeded Andy Flower.

== Points table ==
The tournament was organised in a round robin format, with each team playing each other once.

Team	P	W	L	T	NR	NRR	Points
Sri Lanka	3	3	0	0	0	+0.49	6
Australia	3	2	1	0	0	+0.74	4
India	3	1	2	0	0	-0.01	2
Zimbabwe	3	0	3	0	0	-1.17	0

== Matches ==
26 August
Scorecard

Australia; 263/7 (50 overs)	v	Zimbabwe; 138 (41 overs)
Steve Waugh 82 (70); Guy Whittall 3/53 (10 overs)		Ali Shah 41 (76); Mark Waugh 3/24 (5 overs)

Australia won by 125 runs
R. Premadasa Stadium, Colombo
Umpires: K.T. Francis (SL) and Udaya Wickramasinghe (SL)
Player of the match: Steve Waugh (Aus)

- Australia won the toss and elected to bat.

28 August
Scorecard

India; 226/5 (50 overs)	v	Sri Lanka; 230/1 (44.2 overs)
Sachin Tendulkar 110 (138); Sanath Jayasuriya 1/39 (10 overs)		Sanath Jayasuriya 120 (128); Sachin Tendulkar 1/29 (6 overs)

Sri Lanka won by 9 wickets
R. Premadasa Stadium, Colombo
Umpires: Steve Bucknor (WI) and Cyril Mitchley (SA)
Player of the match: Sanath Jayasuriya (SL)

- India won the toss and elected to bat.

30 August
Scorecard

Australia; 228/9 (50 overs)	v	Sri Lanka; 232/6 (45.5 overs)
Michael Bevan 56 (78); Upul Chandana 3/38 (10 overs)		Aravinda de Silva 83* (95); Damien Fleming 3/26 (8 overs)

Sri Lanka won by 4 wickets
R. Premadasa Stadium, Colombo
Umpires: Steve Bucknor (WI) and Cyril Mitchley (SA)
Player of the match: Sanath Jayasuriya (SL)

- Australia won the toss and elected to bat.

1 September
Scorecard

Zimbabwe; 226 (49.4 overs)	v	India; 229/3 (43.5 overs)
Andy Flower 78 (115); Anil Kumble 4/33 (10 overs)		Ajay Jadeja 68 (80); Craig Evans 1/19 (5 overs)

India wins by 7 wickets
Sinhalese Sports Club, Colombo
Umpires: B. C. Cooray (SL) and T. M. Samarasinghe (SL)
Player of the match: Ajay Jadeja (Ind)

- India won the toss and elected to field.

3 September
Scorecard

Zimbabwe; 227/5 (50 overs)	v	Sri Lanka; 228/4 (47 overs)
Craig Evans 96 (105); Ravindra Pushpakumara 2/27 (6 overs)		Aravinda de Silva 123* (127); Henry Olonga 2/47 (6 overs)

Sri Lanka wins by 4 wickets
Sinhalese Sports Club, Colombo
Umpires: Steve Bucknor (WI) and Cyril Mitchley (SA)
Player of the match: Aravinda de Silva (SL)

- Sri Lanka won the toss and elected to field.

6 September
Scorecard

India; 201 (41 overs)	v	Australia; 202/7 (44.3 overs)
Sourav Ganguly 59 (75); Glenn McGrath 3/33 (9 overs)		Stuart Law 67 (70); Sunil Joshi 2/23 (9 overs)

Australia wins by 3 wickets
Sinhalese Sports Club, Colombo
Umpires: B.C. Cooray (SL) and K.T. Francis (SL)
Player of the match: Steve Waugh (Aus)

- Australia won the toss and elected to field.
- Originally scheduled for 5 September, the match was postponed due to rain. Match reduced to 45 overs maximum per innings on 6 September due to rain.

=== Final ===
7 September
Scorecard

Sri Lanka; 234/3 (35 overs)	v	Australia; 184 (33 overs)
Aravinda de Silva 75* (64); Glenn McGrath 2/35 (7 overs)		Steve Waugh 55 (53); Upul Chandana 4/35 (6 overs)

Sri Lanka won by 50 runs
R. Premadasa Stadium, Colombo
Umpires: Steve Bucknor (WI) and Cyril Mitchley (SA)
Player of the match: Aravinda de Silva (SL)

- Australia won the toss and elected to field.
- Match was delayed by two hours due to rain. The match was thus reduced to 35 overs maximum per innings.

== Records and awards ==
Sri Lanka's vice-captain Aravinda de Silva won the player of the series award for amassing 334 runs in just 4 innings without losing his wicket, remaining unbeaten in all of them. Sri Lankan spin bowler Upul Chandana and Australian fast-bowler Glenn McGrath both took 7 wickets, but Chandana did so in only 3 matches to McGrath's 4.
