= 2000–01 Australia Tri-Nation Series =

- Date: 11 January 2001 – 9 February 2001
- Location: Australia
- Result: Won by Australia; 2–0 in final series
- Player of the series: Brian Lara
Teams
Australia	West Indies	Zimbabwe
Captains
Steve Waugh	Jimmy Adams	Heath Streak
Most runs
Mark Waugh (542)	Brian Lara (372)	Alistair Campbell (290)
Most wickets
Shane Warne (18)	Marlon Samuels (14)	Heath Streak (11)

The 2000–01 Australia Tri-Nation Series (more commonly known as the 2000–01 Carlton Series) was a One Day International (ODI) cricket tri-series where Australia played host to West Indies and Zimbabwe. Australia and West Indies reached the Finals, which Australia won 2–0.

== Squads ==
Australia	West Indies	Zimbabwe
Steve Waugh (c); Michael Bevan; Nathan Bracken; Damien Fleming; Ian Harvey; Brett Lee; Adam Gilchrist; Darren Lehmann; Damien Martyn; Glenn McGrath; Ricky Ponting; Andrew Symonds; Shane Warne; Mark Waugh	Jimmy Adams (c); Marlon Black; Sherwin Campbell; Cameron Cuffy; Darren Ganga; Wavell Hinds; Ridley Jacobs; Sylvester Joseph; Brian Lara; Nixon McLean; Mahendra Nagamootoo; Ricardo Powell; Marlon Samuels; Colin Stuart; Laurie Williams	Heath Streak (c); Guy Whittall; Alistair Campbell; Stuart Carlisle; Andy Flower; Grant Flower; Travis Friend; Gus Mackay; Trevor Madondo; Douglas Marillier; Brian Murphy; Mluleki Nkala; Gavin Rennie; Bryan Strang; Dirk Viljoen

== Points table ==
Pos	Team	P	W	L	NR	T	NRR	Points
1	Australia	8	8	0	0	0	1.36	16
2	West Indies	8	3	5	0	0	−0.725	6
3	Zimbabwe	8	1	7	0	0	−0.546	2

== Result summary ==
=== 1st match ===
11 January 2001
(scorecard)

Australia; 267/6 (50 overs)	v	West Indies; 193/7 (50 overs)
Ricky Ponting 73 (100); Laurie Williams 2/39 (8 overs)		Marlon Samuels 57 (96); Andrew Symonds 4/35 (10 overs)

Australia won by 74 runs
Melbourne Cricket Ground, Melbourne
Umpires: Daryl Harper and Simon Taufel
Player of the match: Ricky Ponting
Attendance: 56,732

- Australia won the toss and elected to bat
- Nathan Bracken (Aus) made his ODI debut

=== 2nd match ===
13 January 2001
(scorecard)

Zimbabwe; 240/9 (50 overs)	v	West Indies; 241/9 (48.4 overs)
Alistair Campbell 81 (105); Nixon McLean 3/48 (10 overs)		Ricardo Powell 83 (90); Guy Whittall 2/16 (3.4 overs)

West Indies won by 1 wicket
Brisbane Cricket Ground, Brisbane
Umpires: Peter Parker and Simon Taufel
Player of the match: Ricardo Powell
Attendance: 12,034

- Zimbabwe won the toss and elected to bat
- West Indies and Zimbabwe play in Brisbane for the first time since 1992

=== 3rd match ===
14 January 2001
(scorecard)

West Indies; 234/8 (50 overs)	v	Australia; 236/1 (43.4 overs)
Wavell Hinds 54 (72); Shane Warne 3/41 (10 overs)		Mark Waugh 112 (128); Ricardo Powell 1/15 (3 overs)

Australia won by 9 wickets
Brisbane Cricket Ground, Brisbane
Umpires: Darrell Hair and Steve Davis
Player of the match: Mark Waugh
Attendance: 35,168

- West Indies won the toss and elected to bat
- First ODI win for Australia against West Indies in Brisbane. West Indies' first loss in Brisbane since 1987

=== 4th match ===
17 January 2001
(scorecard)

Australia; 277/8 (50 overs)	v	West Indies; 211/8 (42.4 overs)
Ricky Ponting 93 (74); Nixon McLean 2/45 (10 overs)		Brian Lara 116 (106); Shane Warne 3/62 (10 overs)

Australia won by 28 runs (D/L method)
Sydney Cricket Ground, Sydney
Umpires: Darrell Hair and Simon Taufel
Player of the match: Brian Lara
Attendance: 39,540

- West Indies won the toss and elected to field
- Colin Stuart (WI) made his ODI debut

=== 5th match ===
21 January 2001
(scorecard)

Zimbabwe; 223/9 (50 overs)	v	Australia; 226/2 (36.5 overs)
Grant Flower 51 (78); Ian Harvey 4/28 (9 overs)		Darren Lehmann 92 (104); Travis Friend 1/52 (6.5 overs)

Australia won by 8 wickets
Melbourne Cricket Ground, Melbourne
Umpires: Peter Parker and Steve Davis
Player of the match: Darren Lehmann

- Zimbabwe won the toss and elected to bat
- Simon Katich (Aus) made his ODI debut

=== 6th match ===
23 January 2001
(scorecard)

Zimbabwe; 138 (47.2 overs)	v	West Indies; 91 (31.5 overs)
Heath Streak 45 (70); Cameron Cuffy 4/24 (10 overs)		Nixon McLean 40 (32); Heath Streak 4/8 (8 overs)

Zimbabwe won by 47 runs
Sydney Cricket Ground, Sydney
Umpires: Peter Parker and Simon Taufel
Player of the match: Heath Streak
Attendance: 8,474

- Zimbabwe won the toss and elected to bat

=== 7th match ===
25 January 2001
(scorecard)

West Indies; 235/6 (47 overs)	v	Zimbabwe; 175 (40.2 overs)
Brian Lara 70 (96); Heath Streak 3/27 (8 overs)		Andy Flower 50 (73); Mahendra Nagamootoo 4/32 (7.2 overs)

West Indies won by 77 runs (D/L)
Adelaide Oval, Adelaide
Umpires: Peter Parker and Darrell Hair
Player of the match: Marlon Samuels

- West Indies won the toss and elected to bat
- West Indies innings was reduced to 47 overs due to rain

=== 8th match ===
26 January 2001
(scorecard)

West Indies; 123 (35.1 overs)	v	Australia; 124/0 (22.5 overs)
Nixon McLean 24 (39); Brett Lee 4/33 (10 overs)		Damien Martyn 69 (80); Marlon Samuels 0/9 (2 overs)

Australia won by 10 wickets
Adelaide Oval, Adelaide
Umpires: Steve Davis and Simon Taufel
Player of the match: Brett Lee

- West Indies won the toss and elected to bat

=== 9th match ===
28 January 2001
(scorecard)

Australia; 291/6 (50 overs)	v	Zimbabwe; 205 (47.5 overs)
Michael Bevan 74 (70); Dirk Viljoen 3/62 (10 overs)		Stuart Carlisle 44 (69); Damien Fleming 2/21 (6 overs)

Australia won by 86 runs
Sydney Cricket Ground, Sydney
Umpires: Peter Parker and Darrell Hair
Player of the match: Michael Bevan
Attendance: 33,748

- Australia won the toss and elected to bat

=== 10th match ===
30 January 2001
(scorecard)

Zimbabwe; 279/6 (50 overs)	v	Australia; 282/4 (44 overs)
Alistair Campbell 124 (142); Glenn McGrath 2/43 (10 overs)		Mark Waugh 102 (113); Brian Murphy 3/52 (10 overs)

Australia won by 6 wickets
Bellerive Oval, Hobart
Umpires: Steve Davis and Simon Taufel
Player of the match: Alistair Campbell
Attendance: 11,115

- Australia won the toss and elected to field
- Brad Haddin (Aus) made his ODI debut. Australia and Zimbabwe play in Hobart for the first time since 1994

=== 11th match ===
2 February 2001
(scorecard)

West Indies; 178 (47.2 overs)	v	Zimbabwe; 134 (42.3 overs)
Brian Lara 83 (98); Dirk Viljoen 2/31 (6.2 overs)		Heath Streak 33 (46); Nixon McLean 3/21 (9 overs)

West Indies won by 44 runs
WACA Ground, Perth
Umpires: Darrell Hair and Simon Taufel
Player of the match: Brian Lara
Attendance: 8,000

- West Indies won the toss and elected to bat

=== 12th match ===
4 February 2001
(scorecard)

Australia; 302/5 (50 overs)	v	Zimbabwe; 301/6 (50 overs)
Damien Martyn 144 (149); Heath Streak 2/63 (10 overs)		Stuart Carlisle 119 (145); Glenn McGrath 2/46 (10 overs)

Australia won by 1 run
WACA Ground, Perth
Umpires: Steve Davis and Daryl Harper
Player of the match: Damien Martyn
Attendance: 19,952

- Australia won the toss and elected to bat

== Final series ==
Australia won the best of three final series against West Indies 2–0. This was the first time Australia had won the best of 3 finals against West Indies.
And this was the second time, the first since the 1996/97 season, that West Indies had lost the best of 3 finals 2-0.

=== 1st Final ===
7 February 2001
(scorecard)

Australia; 253/9 (50 overs)	v	West Indies; 119 (37.2 overs)
Ian Harvey 47 (43); Cameron Cuffy 2/45 (10 overs)		Brian Lara 35 (38); Ian Harvey 2/5 (6 overs)

Australia won by 134 runs
Sydney Cricket Ground, Sydney
Umpires: Daryl Harper and Simon Taufel
Player of the match: Ian Harvey
Attendance: 35,797

- West Indies won the toss and elected to field

=== 2nd Final ===
9 February 2001
(scorecard)

Australia; 338/6 (50 overs)	v	West Indies; 299 (49.3 overs)
Mark Waugh 173 (148); Marlon Samuels 3/71 (10 overs)		Marlon Samuels 63 (54); Shane Warne 4/48 (8.3 overs)

Australia won by 39 runs
Melbourne Cricket Ground, Melbourne
Umpires: Daryl Hair and Steve Davis
Player of the match: Mark Waugh
Attendance: 31.915

- West Indies won the toss and elected to field
- Brian Lara was awarded the Player of the Series
