= Sri Lankan cricket team in Australia in 1995–96 =

International cricket tour

The Sri Lanka national cricket team toured Australia in the 1995-96 season and played 3 Test matches against Australia. Australia won the series 3-0.

The second Test had controversy when umpire Darrell Hair called Sri Lanka's Muttiah Muralitharan for throwing.

== Test series summary ==
=== 1st Test ===
8–11 December 1995
(5-day match)
Scorecard

Sri Lanka	v	Australia
251 (89.4 overs); RS Kaluwitharana 50 (74); GD McGrath 4/81 (24 overs)		617/5d (174 overs); MJ Slater 219 (321); WPUJC Vaas 2/103 (31 overs)
330 (93.4 overs); HP Tillakaratne 119 (206); CJ McDermott 3/73 (20 overs)

Australia won by an innings and 36 runs
WACA Ground, Perth
Umpires: Khizer Hayat (PAK) and PD Parker (AUS)
Player of the match: MJ Slater (AUS)

- Sri Lanka won the toss and elected to bat.
- The match was scheduled for five days but completed in four.
- SG Law and RT Ponting (both AUS) made their Test debuts.

=== 2nd Test ===
26–30 December 1995
(5-day match)
Scorecard

Australia	v	Sri Lanka
500/6d (165 overs); SR Waugh 131* (252); GP Wickramasinghe 2/77 (30.2 overs)		233 (88.4 overs); A Ranatunga 51 (105); GD McGrath 5/40 (23.4 overs)
41/0 (7.4 overs); MA Taylor 25* (23)		307 (f/o) (116.5 overs); AP Gurusinha 143 (274); SK Warne 4/71 (37 overs)

Australia won by 10 wickets
Melbourne Cricket Ground, Melbourne
Umpires: RS Dunne (NZ) and DB Hair (AUS)
Player of the match: GD McGrath (AUS)

- Sri Lanka won the toss and elected to field.

=== 3rd Test ===
25–29 January 1996
(5-day match)
Scorecard

Australia	v	Sri Lanka
502/9d (157.3 overs); SR Waugh 170 (316); WPUJC Vaas 3/106 (42 overs)		317 (97.1 overs); HP Tillakaratne 65 (155); PR Reiffel 5/39 (19.1 overs)
215/6d (73 overs); SR Waugh 61* (129); WPUJC Vaas 3/44 (21 overs)		252 (96.2 overs); ST Jayasuriya 112 (188); SR Waugh 4/34 (19 overs)

Australia won by 148 runs
Adelaide Oval, Adelaide
Umpires: LH Barker (WI) and SG Randell (AUS)
Player of the match: SR Waugh (AUS)

- Australia won the toss and elected to bat.

== External sources ==
- ESPN cricinfo
