= 1999 Aiwa Cup =

- Date: 22–31 August 1999
- Location: Sri Lanka
- Result: Won by Sri Lanka
- Player of the series: Adam Gilchrist (AUS)
Teams
Australia	India	Sri Lanka
Captains
Steve Waugh	Sachin Tendulkar	Sanath Jayasuriya
Most runs
Adam Gilchrist (231) Mark Waugh (174)	Sachin Tendulkar (171); Robin Singh (121)	Marvan Atapattu (169); Sanath Jayasuriya (169)
Most wickets
Jason Gillespie (10) Shane Warne (6)	Venkatesh Prasad (5); Robin Singh (4)	Sanath Jayasuriya (8); Upul Chandana (4)

The 1999 Aiwa Cup was a triangular ODI cricket competition held in different venues across Sri Lanka from 22 to 31 August 1999. It featured the national cricket teams of India, Sri Lanka and Australia. The tournament was won by Sri Lanka, who defeated Australia in the final.

== Points table ==
Team	Pld	W	L	T	NR	NRR	Pts
Australia	4	4	0	0	0	+0.889	8
Sri Lanka	4	1	3	0	0	-0.354	2
India	4	1	3	0	0	-0.533	2

== Group stage ==
=== 1st ODI ===
22 August
Scorecard

Australia; 205/9 (43 overs)	v	Sri Lanka; 160 (37.4 overs)
Michael Bevan 42* (44); Sanath Jayasuriya 5/28 (9 overs)		Romesh Kaluwitharana 33 (46); Jason Gillespie 3/26 (6 overs)

Australia won by 50 runs (D/L)
Galle International Stadium, Galle
Umpires: Asoka de Silva and Peter Manuel (both SL)
Player of the match: Jason Gillespie (AUS)

- Sri Lanka won the toss and elected to field.
- Rain during Australia's innings reduced the match to 43 overs per side
- Indika de Saram (SL) made his ODI debut

=== 2nd ODI ===
23 August
Scorecard

India; 151/7 (38 overs)	v	Australia; 159/2 (29.1 overs)
Robin Singh 38 (52); Tom Moody 2/25 (8 overs)		Andrew Symonds 68* (68); Sourav Ganguly 1/4 (1 over)

Australia won by 8 wickets (D/L)
Galle International Stadium, Galle
Umpires: Lalith Jayasundara and Peter Manuel (both SL)
Player of the match: Andrew Symonds (AUS)

- India won the toss and elected to bat.
- Rain during India's innings reduced the match to 38 overs per side

=== 3rd ODI ===
25 August (D/N)
Scorecard

India; 205/8 (50 overs)	v	Sri Lanka; 206/3 (46.4 overs)
Ajay Jadeja 49 (85); Upul Chandana 2/35 (10 overs)		Marvan Atapattu 71* (126); Nikhil Chopra 2/37 (9 overs)

Sri Lanka won by 7 wickets
R Premadasa Stadium, Colombo
Umpires: Asoka de Silva and Nandasena Pathirana (both SL)
Player of the match: Marvan Atapattu (SL)

- India won the toss and elected to bat.

=== 4th ODI ===
26 August (D/N)
Scorecard

Australia; 241/9 (50 overs)	v	Sri Lanka; 214 (47.1 overs)
Mark Waugh 84 (94); Upul Chandana 3/35 (10 overs)		Chamara Silva 55 (85); Glenn McGrath 2/52 (10 overs); Shane Warne 2/52 (9 overs)

Australia won by 27 runs
R Premadasa Stadium, Colombo
Umpires: Lalith Jayasundara and K. T. Francis (both SL)
Player of the match: Mark Waugh (AUS)

- Australia won the toss and elected to bat.
- Chamara Silva (SL) made his ODI debut.

=== 5th ODI ===
28 August
Scorecard

Australia; 252/8 (50 overs)	v	India; 211 (48.3 overs)
Adam Gilchrist 77 (84); Venkatesh Prasad 2/29 (10 overs)		Sadagoppan Ramesh 71 (123); Jason Gillespie 4/26 (9 overs)

Australia won by 41 runs
Sinhalese Sports Club Ground, Colombo
Umpires: B. C. Cooray and Tyron Wijewardene (both SL)
Player of the match: Adam Gilchrist (AUS)

- India won the toss and elected to field.
- India fined one over for slow over rate.

=== 6th ODI ===
29 August
Scorecard

India; 296/4 (50 overs)	v	Sri Lanka; 247/9 (42 overs)
Sachin Tendulkar 120 (141); Sanath Jayasuriya 1/33 (6 overs)		Sanath Jayasuriya 71 (53); Robin Singh 2/27 (7 overs)

India won by 23 runs (D/L)
Sinhalese Sports Club Ground, Colombo
Umpires: E. K. G. Wijewardene and Gamini Silva (SL)
Player of the match: Robin Singh

- Sri Lanka won the toss and elected to field.
- Rain during Sri Lanka's innings revised their target to 271 in 42 overs

== Final ==
31 August (D/N)
Scorecard

Australia; 202 (50 overs)	v	Sri Lanka; 208/2 (39.3 overs)
Steve Waugh 43 (68); Upul Chandana 2/33 (10 overs); Sanath Jayasuriya 2/33 (7 overs)		Romesh Kaluwitharana 95 (117); Damien Fleming 1/28 (7 overs)

Sri Lanka won by 8 wickets
R Premadasa Stadium, Colombo
Umpires: B. C. Cooray and K. T. Francis (both SL)
Player of the match: Romesh Kaluwitharana (SL)

- Australia won the toss and elected to bat.
- Sri Lanka won the 1999 Aiwa Cup
