= Sri Lankan cricket team in the West Indies in 2003 =

	Sri Lanka	West Indies
- Dates: 4 June – 29 June 2003
Captains	Hashan Tillakaratne (Tests); Marvan Atapattu (ODIs)	Brian Lara

Test series
- Result: West Indies won the 2-match series 1–0
Most runs	Marvan Atapattu (211)	Brian Lara (299)
Most wickets	Muttiah Muralitharan (9)	Corey Collymore (14)
- Player of the series: Corey Collymore (WI)

One Day International series
- Results: Sri Lanka won the 3-match series 2–1
Most runs	Upul Chandana (122)	Brian Lara (194)
Most wickets	Chaminda Vaas (4); Muttiah Muralitharan (4)	Corey Collymore (5)
- Player of the series: Marlon Samuels (WI)

The Sri Lanka national cricket team toured the West Indies in June 2003 to play two Test matches and three One Day Internationals. Sri Lanka won the ODI series 2–1, but the West Indies won the Test series 1–0 after one Test was drawn.

== Squads ==
Tests		ODIs	
West Indies	Sri Lanka	West Indies	Sri Lanka
Brian Lara (c)	Hashan Tillakaratne (c)	Brian Lara (c)	Marvan Atapattu (c)
Omari Banks	Marvan Atapattu	David Bernard	Upul Chandana
Corey Collymore	Kumar Dharmasena	Corey Collymore	Kumar Dharmasena
Mervyn Dillon	Tillakaratne Dilshan (wk)	Mervyn Dillon	Tillakaratne Dilshan (wk)
Vasbert Drakes	Dinusha Fernando	Vasbert Drakes	Dharshana Gamage
Fidel Edwards	Sanath Jayasuriya	Chris Gayle	Sanath Jayasuriya
Daren Ganga	Mahela Jayawardene	Wavell Hinds	Mahela Jayawardene
Chris Gayle	Romesh Kaluwitharana (wk)	Ryan Hurley	Romesh Kaluwitharana (wk)
Wavell Hinds	Kaushal Lokuarachchi	Ridley Jacobs (wk)	Muttiah Muralitharan
Ridley Jacobs (wk)	Muttiah Muralitharan	Daren Powell	Naveed Nawaz
Marlon Samuels	Prabath Nissanka	Ricardo Powell	Prabath Nissanka
Ramnaresh Sarwan	Thilan Samaraweera	Marlon Samuels	Kumar Sangakkara
Jerome Taylor	Kumar Sangakkara	Ramnaresh Sarwan	Chaminda Vaas
	Thilan Thushara	Jerome Taylor	Dinusha Fernando
	Chaminda Vaas		

== Tour matches ==
=== 50-over: Shell Cricket Academy Invitation XI v Sri Lankans ===
4 June 2003
Scorecard

Sri Lankans; 243/7 (50 overs)	v	Shell Cricket Academy Invitation XI; 128/9 (50 overs)
Marvan Atapattu 99; Dwayne Bravo 2/44 (9 overs)		Matthew Sinclair 22; Muttiah Muralitharan 3/5 (7 overs)

Sri Lankans won by 115 runs
Queen's Park, St. George's, Grenada
Umpires: Glenroy T. Johnson (WI) and EA Jones (WI)

- Sri Lankans won the toss and elected to bat.
- Krishna Arjune, Jason Bennett and Jerome Taylor (all Shell Cricket Academy Invitation XI) made their List A debuts.

=== First-class: West Indies Cricket Board President's XI v Sri Lankans ===
14–16 June 2003
Scorecard

Sri Lankans	v	WICB President's XI
299 (123.3 overs); Marvan Atapattu 59; Jerome Taylor 2/22 (10 overs)		296 (78.5 overs); Ryan Hinds 83; Thilan Samaraweera 3/56 (19 overs)
66/1 (15.2 overs); Sanath Jayasuriya 44*; Dwayne Bravo 1/12 (4.2 overs)

Match drawn
Arnos Vale Stadium, Kingstown, Saint Vincent
Umpires: Goaland Greaves (WI) and Gary White (WI)

- Sri Lankans won the toss and elected to bat.
- Play on Day 1 reduced to 18 overs due to rain.

== ODI series ==
=== 1st ODI ===
7 June 2003
Scorecard

Sri Lanka; 201 (48.4 overs)	v	West Indies; 146 (41 overs)
Romesh Kaluwitharana 54 (75); Mervyn Dillon 3/39 (9.4 overs)		Brian Lara 64* (130); Muttiah Muralitharan 3/17 (7 overs)

Sri Lanka won by 55 runs
Kensington Oval, Bridgetown, Barbados
Umpires: Billy Bowden (NZ) and Billy Doctrove (WI)
Player of the match: Muttiah Muralitharan (SL)

- West Indies won the toss and elected to field.

=== 2nd ODI ===
8 June 2003
Scorecard

West Indies; 312/4 (50 overs)	v	Sri Lanka; 313/6 (49.3 overs)
Brian Lara 116 (106); Chaminda Vaas 1/33 (10 overs)		Upul Chandana 89 (71); Vasbert Drakes 2/49 (7 overs)

Sri Lanka won by 4 wickets
Kensington Oval, Bridgetown, Barbados
Umpires: Billy Bowden (NZ) and Eddie Nicholls (WI)
Player of the match: Upul Chandana (SL)

- West Indies won the toss and elected to bat.

=== 3rd ODI ===
11 June 2003
Scorecard

Sri Lanka; 191 (50 overs)	v	West Indies; 160/4 (36.5 overs)
Mahela Jayawardene 51 (74); Corey Collymore 3/28 (10 overs)		Marlon Samuels 45* (38); Upul Chandana 1/25 (4 overs)

West Indies won by 6 wickets (D/L method)
Arnos Vale Stadium, Kingstown, Saint Vincent
Umpires: Billy Bowden (NZ) and Billy Doctrove (WI)
Player of the match: Marlon Samuels (WI)

- West Indies won the toss and elected to field.
- Rain reduced the West Indies innings to 42 overs.
- Jerome Taylor (WI) made his ODI debut.

== Test series ==
=== 1st Test ===
20–24 June 2003
Scorecard

Sri Lanka	v	West Indies
354 (143.2 overs); Marvan Atapattu 118 (275); Corey Collymore 5/66 (29 overs)		477/9d (138.3 overs); Brian Lara 209 (360); Muttiah Muralitharan 5/138 (50 overs)
126/0 (34 overs); Sanath Jayasuriya 72* (113)

Match drawn
Beausejour Stadium, Gros Islet, Saint Lucia
Umpires: Billy Bowden (NZ) and Daryl Harper (Aus)
Player of the match: Brian Lara (WI)

- Sri Lanka won the toss and elected to bat.
- No play was possible on Day 4 due to rain.
- Jerome Taylor (WI) made his Test debut.

=== 2nd Test ===
27–29 June 2003
Scorecard

Sri Lanka	v	West Indies
208 (85.4 overs); Kumar Sangakkara 75 (212); Fidel Edwards 5/36 (15.4 overs)		191 (53.3 overs); Chris Gayle 31 (48); Prabath Nissanka 5/64 (12.3 overs)
194 (54 overs); Mahela Jayawardene 32 (60); Corey Collymore 7/57 (16 overs)		212/3 (42.4 overs); Ramnaresh Sarwan 82 (110); Chaminda Vaas 2/54 (12 overs)

West Indies won by 7 wickets
Sabina Park, Kingston, Jamaica
Umpires: Darrell Hair (Aus) and Russell Tiffin (Zim)
Player of the match: Corey Collymore (WI)

- West Indies won the toss and elected to field.
- Thilan Thushara (SL) and Fidel Edwards (WI) made their Test debuts.
