= Australian cricket team in Sri Lanka in 2003–04 =

Cricket results

| | Sri Lanka | Australia |
- Dates: 17 February 2004 – 28 March 2004
| Captains | Marvan Atapattu (ODI); Hashan Tillakaratne (Test) | Ricky Ponting |

Test series
- Result: Australia won the 3-match series 3–0
| Most runs | Sanath Jayasuriya (294) | Darren Lehmann (375) |
| Most wickets | Muttiah Muralitharan (28) | Shane Warne (26) |
- Player of the series: Darren Lehmann (Aus)

One Day International series
- Results: Australia won the 5-match series 3–2
| Most runs | Kumar Sangakkara (250) | Ricky Ponting (257) |
| Most wickets | Chaminda Vaas (7) | Brad Hogg (9) |
- Player of the series: Andrew Symonds (Aus)

The Australian cricket team toured Sri Lanka from 17 February to 28 March 2004 to play three Tests and five One Day Internationals (ODIs) matches. Australia won the 3-match Test series 3-0 and 5-match ODI series 3-2.

== Tour matches ==
=== List A: Sri Lanka Board XI vs Australia XI ===
17 February
Scorecard

| Sri Lanka Board XI; 283/8 (50 overs) | v | Australia; 284/5 (45.1 overs) |
| Jehan Mubarak 56 (66); Brad Hogg 2/46 (10 overs) | | Ricky Ponting 57* (77); Charitha Buddhika 1/38 (8 overs) |

Australians won by 5 wickets
De Soysa Stadium, Moratuwa
Umpires: Gamini Dissanayake (Sri)

- Sri Lanka Board XI won the toss and elected to bat

=== First-class: Sri Lankan XI vs Australia ===
2–4 March 2004
Scorecard

| Australians | v | Sri Lanka XI |
| 484/6d (89.5 overs); Darren Lehmann 134 (143); Rangana Herath 3/132 (24.5 overs) | | 166 (36.2 overs); Avishka Gunawardene 70 (93); Brett Lee 4/29 (7 overs) |
| 250/4d (50 overs); Andrew Symonds 119* (138); Kaushal Lokuarachchi 2/51 (10 overs) | | 323 (85.2 overs); Lanka de Silva 92 (136); Stuart MacGill 3/57 (13 overs) |

Australians won by 245 runs
CCC Ground, Colombo
Umpires: Ranmore Martinesz (SL) and Jagath Nandakumar (SL)

- Sri Lanka Cricket President's XI and elected to field.

== ODI series ==
=== 1st ODI ===
20 February 2004 (D/N)
Scorecard

| Australia; 262/6 (50 overs) | v | Sri Lanka; 178 (43.3 overs) |
| Adam Gilchrist 66 (64); Muttiah Muralitharan 2/30 (10 overs) | | Mahela Jayawardene 61 (91); Brad Hogg 5/41 (9.3 overs) |

Australia won by 84 runs
Rangiri Dambulla International Stadium, Dambulla
Umpires: Billy Bowden (NZ) and Asoka de Silva (SL)
Player of the match: Brad Hogg (Aus)

- Australia won the toss and elected to bat.

=== 2nd ODI ===
22 February 2004 (D/N)
Scorecard

| Sri Lanka; 245 (49.5 overs) | v | Australia; 244/5 (50 overs) |
| Sanath Jayasuriya 55 (65); Michael Clarke 5/35 (7.5 overs) | | Matthew Hayden 93 (116); Chaminda Vaas 3/48 (10 overs) |

Sri Lanka won by 1 run
Rangiri Dambulla International Stadium, Dambulla
Umpires: Billy Bowden (NZ) and Peter Manuel (SL)
Player of the match: Chaminda Vaas (SL)

- Sri Lanka won the toss and elected to bat.
- This was Romesh Kaluwitharana's Last ODI match

=== 3rd ODI ===
25 February 2004 (D/N)
Scorecard

| Sri Lanka; 226/8 (50 overs) | v | Australia; 227/5 (48.3 overs) |
| Mahela Jayawardene 80 (110); Jason Gillespie 3/36 (10 overs) | | Ricky Ponting 63 (75); Chaminda Vaas 3/34 (9 overs) |

Australia won by 5 wickets
R Premadasa Stadium, Colombo
Umpires: Billy Bowden (NZ) and Asoka de Silva (SL)
Player of the match: Jason Gillespie (Aus)

- Sri Lanka won the toss and elected to bat.

=== 4th ODI ===
27 February 2004 (D/N)
Scorecard

| Australia; 233 (47.4 overs) | v | Sri Lanka; 193 (43.4 overs) |
| Ricky Ponting 67 (79); Upul Chandana 3/37 (7.4 overs) | | Kumar Sangakkara 101 (110); Michael Kasprowicz 5/45 (9 overs) |

Australia won by 40 runs
R Premadasa Stadium, Colombo
Umpires: Billy Bowden (NZ) and Tyron Wijewardene (SL)
Player of the match: Michael Kasprowicz (Aus)

- Australia won the toss and elected to bat.

=== 5th ODI ===
29 February 2004
Scorecard

| Australia; 198/7 (50 overs) | v | Sri Lanka; 202/7 (47.5 overs) |
| Andrew Symonds 40 (48); Nuwan Zoysa 3/34 (41 overs) | | Nuwan Zoysa 47* (42); Michael Kasprowicz 2/20 (9 overs) |

Sri Lanka won by 3 wickets
Sinhalese Sports Club Ground, Colombo
Umpires: Billy Bowden (NZ) and Asoka de Silva (SL)
Player of the match: Nuwan Zoysa (SL)

- Australia won the toss and elected to bat.

== Test series ==
=== 1st Test ===
8–12 March 2004
Scorecard

| Australia | v | Sri Lanka |
| 220 (68.3 overs); Darren Lehmann 63 (113); Muttiah Muralitharan 6/59 (21.3 overs) | | 381 (136.4 overs); Tillakaratne Dilshan 104 (188); Shane Warne 5/116 (42.4 overs) |
| 512/8d (152 overs); Matthew Hayden 130 (211); Muttiah Muralitharan 5/153 (56 overs) | | 154 (45.2 overs); Upul Chandana 43 (34); Shane Warne 5/43 (15 overs) |

Australia won by 197 runs
Galle International Stadium, Galle
Umpires: Rudi Koertzen (SA) and David Shepherd (Eng)
Player of the match: Matthew Hayden (Aus)

- Australia won the toss and elected to bat.
- Andrew Symonds (Aus) made his Test debut.

=== 2nd Test ===
16–20 March 2004
Scorecard

| Australia | v | Sri Lanka |
| 120 (42.2 overs); Matthew Hayden 54 (99); Muttiah Muralitharan 4/48 (15 overs) | | 211 (63.1 overs); Chaminda Vaas 68 (126); Shane Warne 5/65 (20.1 overs) |
| 442 (134.3 overs); Damien Martyn 161 (349); Muttiah Muralitharan 5/173 (50.3 overs) | | 324 (73.1 overs); Sanath Jayasuriya 134 (145); Shane Warne 5/90 (21.1 overs) |

Australia won by 27 runs
Asgiriya Stadium, Kandy
Umpires: Steve Bucknor (WIN) and Dave Orchard (SA)
Player of the match: Shane Warne (Aus)

- Australia won the toss and elected to bat.

=== 3rd Test ===
24–28 March 2004
Scorecard

| Australia | v | Sri Lanka |
| 401 (115.1 overs); Darren Lehmann 153 (269); Muttiah Muralitharan 5/123 (37.1 overs) | | 407 (127.1 overs); Marvan Atapattu 118 (219); Darren Lehmann 3/50 (19 overs) |
| 375 (106.2 overs); Justin Langer 166 (295); Rangana Herath 4/92 (24.2 overs) | | 248 (93.4 overs); Thilan Samaraweera 53 (126); Shane Warne 4/92 (33 overs) |

Australia won by 121 runs
Sinhalese Sports Club Ground, Colombo
Umpires: Steve Bucknor (WIN) and Dave Orchard (SA)
Player of the match: Shane Warne (Aus)

- Australia won the toss and elected to bat.
