= Sri Lankan cricket team in South Africa in 2000–01 =

	South Africa	Sri Lanka
- Dates: 7 December 2000 – 22 January 2001
Captains	SM Pollock	ST Jayasuriya

Test series
- Result: South Africa won the 3-match series 2–0
Most runs	G Kirsten (266)	KC Sangakkara (235)
Most wickets	SM Pollock (13)	M Muralitharan (12)
- Player of the series: SM Pollock (SA)

One Day International series
- Results: South Africa won the 6-match series 5–1
Most runs	JN Rhodes (273)	RS Kaluwitharana (227)
Most wickets	SM Pollock (10)	WPUJC Vaas (9)
- Player of the series: JH Kallis (SA)

The Sri Lankan cricket team toured South Africa during the 2000–01 season, playing three Tests and six one-day internationals.

Sri Lanka was led by Sanath Jayasuriya while South Africa was led by Shaun Pollock. The tour began with a Test series consisting of three matches. South Africa won two Test matches, winning the series 2–0, with one Test drawn. At the end of the series, Gary Kirsten of South Africa emerged as the top run-scorer with 266 runs, with an average of 88.66. Shaun Pollock and Muttiah Muralitharan finished the series as top wicket-takers capturing 13 and 12 wickets respectively. Pollock was named "man of the series".

== One Day Internationals (ODIs) ==
=== 1st ODI ===
15 December 2000 (D/N)
Scorecard

Sri Lanka; 221 (49.5 overs)	v	South Africa; 223/6 (47.2 overs)
KC Sangakkara 84 (114); SM Pollock 4/36 (9.5 overs)		JN Rhodes 61* (80); DNT Zoysa 2/35 (9 overs)

South Africa won by 4 wickets
St George's Park Cricket Ground, Port Elizabeth
Umpires: WA Diedricks (SA) and RE Koertzen (SA)
Player of the match: JN Rhodes (SA)

- Sri Lanka won the toss and elected to bat.

=== 2nd ODI ===
17 December 2000
Scorecard

South Africa; 302/7 (50 overs)	v	Sri Lanka; 207/6 (50 overs)
ND McKenzie 120* (135); DNT Zoysa 2/68 (10 overs)		DPMD Jayawardene 59 (84); SM Pollock 2/34 (10 overs)

South Africa won by 95 runs
Buffalo Park, East London
Umpires: IL Howell (SA) and DL Orchard (SA)
Player of the match: ND McKenzie (SA)

- South Africa won the toss and elected to bat.

=== 3rd ODI ===
9 January 2001 (D/N)
Scorecard

Sri Lanka; 247/4 (50 overs)	v	South Africa; 250/2 (48.5 overs)
RS Kaluwitharana 83 (117); N Boje 2/39 (10 overs)		JH Kallis 100* (139); K Weeraratne 1/30 (6 overs)

South Africa won by 8 wickets
Boland Park, Paarl
Umpires: WA Diedricks (SA) and DL Orchard (SA)
Player of the match: JH Kallis (SA)

- Sri Lanka won the toss and elected to bat.
- CRD Fernando (SL) made his ODI debut.

=== 4th ODI ===
11 January 2001 (D/N)
Scorecard

South Africa; 290/7 (50 overs)	v	Sri Lanka; 191 (42.2 overs)
JH Kallis 82 (79); WPUJC Vaas 3/44 (10 overs)		RS Kaluwitharana 74 (107); M Ntini 5/37 (8.2 overs)

South Africa won by 99 runs
Newlands, Cape Town
Umpires: RE Koertzen (SA) and SB Lambson (SA)
Player of the match: M Ntini (SA)

- South Africa won the toss and elected to bat.

=== 5th ODI ===
14 January 2001
Scorecard

Sri Lanka; 206 (49.2 overs)	v	South Africa; 207/5 (42 overs)
KC Sangakkara 33 (52); SM Pollock 3/44 (10 overs)		HH Gibbs 79 (112); GP Wickramasinghe 1/23 (3 overs)

South Africa won by 5 wickets
Goodyear Park, Bloemfontein
Umpires: BG Jerling (SA) and RE Koertzen (SA)
Player of the match: HH Gibbs (SA)

- South Africa won the toss and elected to field.
- JM Kemp (SA) made his ODI debut.

=== 6th ODI ===
17 January 2001
Scorecard

Sri Lanka; 214/6 (42 overs)	v	South Africa; 204 (42 overs)
RP Arnold 65* (56); R Telemachus 3/25 (8 overs)		ND McKenzie 47 (74); M Muralitharan 2/25 (9 overs)

Sri Lanka won by 4 runs (D/L method)
New Wanderers, Johannesburg
Umpires: DF Becker (SA) and DL Orchard (SA)
Player of the match: RP Arnold (SL)

- South Africa won the toss and elected to field.
- The match was reduced to 42 overs per side, South Africa's target was 209 runs.

== Test series summary ==
=== 1st Test ===
26–30 December 2000
Scorecard

South Africa	v	Sri Lanka
420 (152.3 overs); G Kirsten 180 (461); CRD Fernando 5/98 (34 overs)		216 (87.4 overs); DPMD Jayawardene 98 (195); SM Pollock 3/40 (20.4 overs)
140/7d (34 overs); G Kirsten 34 (71); M Muralitharan 6/39 (10 overs)		149/6 (74 overs); RP Arnold 30 (100); NJ Boje 2/30 (24 overs)

Match drawn
Kingsmead, Durban
Umpires: DL Orchard (SA) and Riazuddin (PAK)
Player of the match: G Kirsten (SA)

- South Africa won the toss and elected to bat.
- There was no play on the fourth day.

=== 2nd Test ===
2–4 January 2001
Scorecard

Sri Lanka	v	South Africa
95 (38.4 overs); KC Sangakkara 32 (76); SM Pollock 6/30 (13.4 overs)		504/7d (158.2 overs); DJ Cullinan 112 (232); RP Arnold 3/76 (24.2 overs)
180 (45.2 overs); DPMD Jayawardene 45 (65); N Boje 4/28 (10 overs)

South Africa won by an innings and 229 runs
Newlands, Cape Town
Umpires: IL Howell (SA) and EA Nicholls (WI)
Player of the match: SM Pollock (SA)

- Sri Lanka won the toss and elected to bat.
- The match was scheduled for five days but completed in three.

=== 3rd Test ===
20–22 January 2001
Scorecard

South Africa	v	Sri Lanka
378 (91.3 overs); SM Pollock 111 (106); DNT Zoysa 4/76 (22 overs)		119 (36.5 overs); RS Kaluwitharana 32 (30); M Ntini 4/39 (11 overs)
		252 (f/o) (81.3 overs); KC Sangakkara 98 (215); JM Kemp 3/33 (13 overs)

South Africa won by an innings and 7 runs
Centurion Park, Centurion, Gauteng
Umpires: RE Koertzen (SA) and P Willey (ENG)
Player of the match: SM Pollock (SA)

- Sri Lanka won the toss and elected to field.
- The match was scheduled for five days but completed in three.
- JM Kemp (SA) made his Test debut.
