= International cricket in 1996 =

International cricket season

The 1996 international cricket season was from April 1996 to September 1996.

== Season overview ==
International tours
Start date	Home team	Away team	Results [Matches]			
Start date	Home team	Away team	Test	ODI	FC	LA
23 May 1996	England	India	1–0 [3]	2–0 [3]	—	—
25 July 1996	England	Pakistan	0–2 [3]	2–1 [3]	—	—
11 September 1996	Sri Lanka	Zimbabwe	2–0 [2]	—	—	—
International tournaments
Start date	Tournament				Winners	
26 August 1996	(Sri Lanka) 1996 Singer World Series				Sri Lanka	
16 September 1996	(Canada) 1996 'Friendship' Cup				Pakistan	

== May ==
=== India in England ===
ODI series
No.	Date	Home captain	Away captain	Venue	Result
ODI 1102	23–24 May	Mike Atherton	Mohammad Azharuddin	Kennington Oval, London	No result
ODI 1103	25 May	Mike Atherton	Mohammad Azharuddin	Headingley Cricket Ground, Leeds	England by 6 wickets
ODI 1104	26–27 May	Mike Atherton	Mohammad Azharuddin	Old Trafford Cricket Ground, Manchester	England by 4 wickets
Test series
No.	Date	Home captain	Away captain	Venue	Result
Test 1327	6–9 June	Mike Atherton	Mohammad Azharuddin	Edgbaston Cricket Ground, Birmingham	England by 8 wickets
Test 1328	20–24 June	Mike Atherton	Mohammad Azharuddin	Lord's, London	Match drawn
Test 1329	4–9 July	Mike Atherton	Mohammad Azharuddin	Trent Bridge, Nottingham	Match drawn

== July ==
=== Pakistan in England ===
Test series
No.	Date	Home captain	Away captain	Venue	Result
Test 1330	25–29 July	Mike Atherton	Wasim Akram	Lord's, London	Pakistan by 164 runs
Test 1331	8–12 August	Mike Atherton	Wasim Akram	Headingley Cricket Ground, Leeds	Match drawn
Test 1332	22–26 August	Mike Atherton	Wasim Akram	Kennington Oval, London	Pakistan by 9 wickets
ODI series
No.	Date	Home captain	Away captain	Venue	Result
ODI 1107	22–26 August	Mike Atherton	Wasim Akram	Old Trafford Cricket Ground, Manchester	England by 5 wickets
ODI 1109	31 August	Mike Atherton	Wasim Akram	Edgbaston Cricket Ground, Birmingham	England by 107 runs
ODI 1109	1 September	Mike Atherton	Wasim Akram	Trent Bridge, Nottingham	Pakistan by 2 wickets

== August ==
=== Singer World Series Cup 1996 ===
Team	P	W	L	T	NR	NRR	Points
Sri Lanka	3	3	0	0	0	+0.49	6
Australia	3	2	1	0	0	+0.74	4
India	3	1	2	0	0	-0.01	2
Zimbabwe	3	0	3	0	0	-1.17	0

Group stage
No.	Date	Team 1	Captain 1	Team 2	Captain 2	Venue	Result
ODI 1105	26 August	Australia	Ian Healy	Zimbabwe	Alistair Campbell	R Premadasa Stadium, Colombo	Australia by 125 runs
ODI 1106	28 August	Sri Lanka	Arjuna Ranatunga	India	Sachin Tendulkar	R Premadasa Stadium, Colombo	Sri Lanka by 9 wickets
ODI 1108	30 August	Sri Lanka	Arjuna Ranatunga	Australia	Ian Healy	R Premadasa Stadium, Colombo	Sri Lanka by 4 wickets
ODI 1110	1 September	India	Sachin Tendulkar	Zimbabwe	Alistair Campbell	R Premadasa Stadium, Colombo	India by 7 wickets
ODI 1112	3 September	Sri Lanka	Arjuna Ranatunga	Zimbabwe	Alistair Campbell	R Premadasa Stadium, Colombo	Sri Lanka by 4 wickets
ODI 1113	6 September	Australia	Ian Healy	India	Sachin Tendulkar	R Premadasa Stadium, Colombo	Australia by 3 wickets
Finals
No.	Date	Team 1	Captain 1	Team 2	Captain 2	Venue	Result
ODI 1114	7 September	Sri Lanka	Arjuna Ranatunga	Australia	Ian Healy	R Premadasa Stadium, Colombo	Sri Lanka by 50 runs

== September ==
=== Zimbabwe in Sri Lanka ===
Test series
No.	Date	Home captain	Away captain	Venue	Result
Test 1333	11–14 September	Arjuna Ranatunga	Alistair Campbell	R. Premadasa Stadium, Colombo	Sri Lanka by an innings and 77 runs
Test 1334	11–14 September	Arjuna Ranatunga	Alistair Campbell	Sinhalese Sports Club Ground, Colombo	Sri Lanka by 10 wickets

=== Sahara Cup 1996 ===
Friendship Cup
No.	Date	Team 1	Captain 1	Team 2	Captain 2	Venue	Result
ODI 1115	16 September	India	Sachin Tendulkar	Pakistan	Wasim Akram	Toronto Cricket, Skating and Curling Club, Toronto	India by 8 wickets
ODI 1116	17 September	India	Sachin Tendulkar	Pakistan	Wasim Akram	Toronto Cricket, Skating and Curling Club, Toronto	Pakistan by 2 wickets
ODI 1117	18 September	India	Sachin Tendulkar	Pakistan	Wasim Akram	Toronto Cricket, Skating and Curling Club, Toronto	India by 55 runs
ODI 1118	21 September	India	Sachin Tendulkar	Pakistan	Wasim Akram	Toronto Cricket, Skating and Curling Club, Toronto	Pakistan by 97 runs
ODI 1119	23 September	India	Sachin Tendulkar	Pakistan	Wasim Akram	Toronto Cricket, Skating and Curling Club, Toronto	Pakistan by 52 runs
