= 1999–2000 Australia Tri-Nation Series =

1999–2000 Carlton and United Series
- Date: 9 January 2000 – 4 February 2000
- Location: Australia
- Result: Won by Australia; 2–0 in final series
- Player of the series: Abdul Razzaq
Teams
Australia	India	Pakistan
Captains
Steve Waugh	Sachin Tendulkar	Wasim Akram
Most runs
Ricky Ponting (404) Michael Bevan (388) Mark Waugh (305)	Sourav Ganguly (356); Rahul Dravid (268); Robin Singh (214)	Ijaz Ahmed (263); Mohammad Yousuf (242); Saeed Anwar (237)
Most wickets
Glenn McGrath (19) Shane Lee (16) Brett Lee (16)	Javagal Srinath (14); Anil Kumble (10); Sourav Ganguly (6); Venkatesh Prasad (6)	Shoaib Akhtar (16); Abdul Razzaq (14); Wasim Akram (13)

The 1999–2000 Australia Tri-Nation Series (more commonly known as the 1999–2000 Carlton and United Series) was a One Day International (ODI) cricket tri-series where Australia played host to India and Pakistan. Australia and Pakistan reached the Finals, which Australia won 2–0.

Ricky Ponting was the leading scorer of the series and Glenn McGrath, the leading wicket-taker.

== Squads ==
Squads
Australia	India	Pakistan
Steve Waugh (c)	Sachin Tendulkar (c)	Wasim Akram (c)
Adam Gilchrist (wk)	Sameer Dighe (wk)	Moin Khan (wk)
Mark Waugh	Sourav Ganguly	Ijaz Ahmed
Michael Bevan	Rahul Dravid	Yousuf Youhana
Damien Fleming	Robin Singh	Saeed Anwar
Shane Lee	Jacob Martin	Abdul Razzaq
Adam Dale	Anil Kumble	Azhar Mahmood
Ian Harvey	Hrishikesh Kanitkar	Shahid Afridi
Brett Lee	Venkatesh Prasad	Waqar Younis
Stuart MacGill	VVS Laxman	Saqlain Mushtaq
Glenn McGrath	Devang Gandhi	Inzamam ul Haq
Damien Martyn	Javagal Srinath	Wajahatullah Wasti
Ricky Ponting	Nikhil Chopra	Shoaib Akhtar
Andrew Symonds	Ajit Agarkar	Shoaib Malik
Shane Warne	Sunil Joshi	Mohammad Wasim
–	Debasis Mohanty	–

== Group stage ==
=== Match results ===
==== 1st match ====
9 January 2000
(scorecard)

Pakistan; 184/8 (50 overs)	v	Australia; 139 (39 overs)
Saqlain Mushtaq 37 (46); Andrew Symonds 3–34 (10 overs)		Ricky Ponting 32 (31); Abdul Razzaq 4–23 (8 overs)

Pakistan won by 45 runs
Brisbane Cricket Ground
Umpires: Daryl Harper & Peter Parker
Player of the match: (Pakistan) Abdul Razzaq
Attendance: 35,738

- Pakistan won the toss and elected to bat
- This was Brett Lee's first ODI Match

==== 2nd match ====
10 January 2000
(scorecard)

India; 195 (48.5 overs)	v	Pakistan; 8/196 (49 overs)
Sourav Ganguly 61 (101); Shoaib Akhtar 3–19 (8 overs)		Yousuf Youhana 63 (83); Javagal Srinath 4–49 (10 overs)

Pakistan won by 2 wickets (with 0 balls remaining)
Brisbane Cricket Ground
Umpires: Steve Davis & Simon Taufel
Player of the match: (Pakistan) Yousuf Youhana
Attendance: 15,583

- India won the toss and elected to bat
- Pakistan were fined 1 over for slow over rate

==== 3rd match ====
12 January 2000
(scorecard)

Australia; 7/269 (50 overs)	v	India; 6/241 (50 overs)
Ricky Ponting 115 (121); Javagal Srinath 2–52 (10 overs)		Sourav Ganguly 100 (127); Glenn Mcgrath 1–32 (10 overs)

Australia won by 28 runs
Melbourne Cricket Ground
Umpires: Daryl Harper & Simon Taufel
Player of the match: (Australia) Ricky Ponting
Attendance: 73,219

- Australia won the toss and elected to bat

==== 4th match ====
14 January 2000
(scorecard)

India; 100 (36.3 overs)	v	Australia; 5/101 (26.5 overs)
Rahul Dravid 22 (70); Glenn McGrath 4–8 (10 overs)		Adam Gilchrist 37 (51); Javagal Srinath 4–30 (10 overs)

Australia won by 5 wickets (with 139 balls remaining)
Sydney Cricket Ground
Umpires: Peter Parker & Simon Taufel
Player of the match: (Australia) Andrew Symonds
Attendance: 38,831

- India won the toss and elected to bat

==== 5th match ====
16 January 2000
(scorecard)

Pakistan; 9/176 (41 overs)	v	Australia; 4/177 (38.5 overs)
Abdul Razzaq 51 (54); Shane Lee 3–24 (8 overs)		Steve Waugh 81 (92); Shoaib Akhtar 2–32 (8 overs)

Australia won by 6 wickets (with 13 balls remaining)
Melbourne Cricket Ground
Umpires: Peter Parker & Simon Taufel
Player of the match: (Australia) Steve Waugh
Attendance: 37,325

- Australia won the toss and elected to field
- Early rain reduced the match to 41 overs a side.

==== 6th match ====
19 January 2000
(scorecard)

Australia; 286 (49.4 overs)	v	Pakistan; 205 (45.2 overs)
Michael Bevan 77 (97); Wasim Akram 3–40 (9 overs)		Abdul Razzaq 40 (38); Stuart MacGill 4–19 (10 overs)

Australia won by 81 runs
Sydney Cricket Ground
Umpires: Steve Davis & Daryl Harper
Player of the match: (Australia) Stuart MacGill
Attendance: 38,006

- Australia won the toss and elected to bat

==== 7th match ====
21 January 2000
(scorecard)

Pakistan; 7/262 (50 overs)	v	India; 230 (46.5 overs)
Abdul Razzaq 70 (52); Venkatesh Prasad 2–41 (10 overs)		Sachin Tendulkar 93 (103); Abdul Razzaq 5–48 (10 overs)

Pakistan won by 32 runs
Bellerive Oval, Hobart
Umpires: Peter Parker & Daryl Harper
Player of the match: (Pakistan) Abdul Razzaq
Attendance: 6,128

- India won the toss and elected to field
- India were fined 2 overs for a slow over rate

==== 8th match ====
23 January 2000
(scorecard)

Australia; 9/260 (50 overs)	v	Pakistan; 245 (48.5 overs)
Michael Bevan 83 (101); Shahid Afridi 2–45 (9 overs)		Ijaz Ahmed 85 (104); Shane Lee 4–37 (8.5 overs)

Australia won by 15 runs
Melbourne Cricket Ground
Umpires: Darrell Hair & Peter Parker
Player of the match: (Australia) Michael Bevan
Attendance: 56,815

- Australia won the toss and elected to bat
- Rain interrupted play from 9:18pm to 9:41pm. No change was made to the overs.

==== 9th match ====
25 January 2000
(scorecard)

India; 6/267 (50 overs)	v	Pakistan; 219 (44.4 overs)
Sourav Ganguly 141 (144); Saqlain Mushtaq 2–56 (10 overs)		Azhar Mahmood 67 (50); Anil Kumble 4–40 (9.4 overs)

India won by 48 runs
Adelaide Oval
Umpires: Steve Davis & Darrell Hair
Player of the match: (India) Sourav Ganguly
Attendance: 11,263

- India won the toss and elected to bat

==== 10th match ====
26 January 2000
(scorecard)

Australia; 5/329 (50 overs)	v	India; 177 (46.5 overs)
Mark Waugh 116 (131); Anil Kumble 2–71 (10 overs)		Rahul Dravid 63 (82); Brett Lee 5–27 (8.5 overs)

Australia won by 152 runs
Adelaide Oval
Umpires: Daryl Harper & Simon Taufel
Player of the match: (Australia) Mark Waugh
Attendance: 29,506

- Australia won the toss and elected to bat

==== 11th match ====
28 January 2000
(scorecard)

Pakistan; 8/261 (50 overs)	v	India; 157 (46 overs)
Saeed Anwar 44 (48); Sourav Ganguly 3–34 (10 overs)		Robin Singh 51 (102); Wasim Akram 3–10 (7 overs)

Pakistan won by 104 runs
WACA Ground, Perth
Umpires: Simon Taufel & Darrell Hair
Player of the match: (Pakistan) Wasim Akram
Attendance: 10,531

- Pakistan won the toss and elected to bat

==== 12th match ====
30 January 2000
(scorecard)

India; 6/226 (50 overs)	v	Australia; 6/230 (49.3 overs)
Rahul Dravid 65 (106); Damien Martyn 1–19 (5 overs)		Michael Bevan 71 (92); Sunil Joshi 2–33 (10 overs)

Australia won by 4 wickets (with 3 balls remaining)
WACA Ground, Perth
Umpires: Steve Davis & Darrell Hair
Player of the match: (Australia) Michael Bevan
Attendance: 26,116

- India won the toss and elected to bat

=== Points table ===
Australia and Pakistan qualified for the Finals with seven and four wins respectively.

Team	P	W	L	T	NR	NRR	Points
Australia	8	7	1	0	0	+0.920	14
Pakistan	8	4	4	0	0	+0.070	8
India	8	1	7	0	0	−0.972	2

== Final series ==
Australia won the best of three final series against Pakistan 2–0.

=== 1st final ===
2 February 2000
(scorecard)

Pakistan; 154 (47.2 overs)	v	Australia; 4/155 (42.4 overs)
Moin Khan 47 (48); Glenn McGrath 3–17 (9 overs)		Michael Bevan 54 (102); Shoaib Akhtar 2–26 (7 overs)

Australia won by 6 wickets (with 44 balls remaining)
Melbourne Cricket Ground
Umpires: Daryl Harper & Simon Taufel
Player of the match: (Australia) Glenn McGrath
Attendance: 39,041

- Pakistan won the toss and elected to bat

=== 2nd final ===
4 February 2000
(scorecard)

Australia; 7/337 (50 overs)	v	Pakistan; 185 (36.3 overs)
Ricky Ponting 78 (80); Saqlain Mushtaq 2–54 (10 overs)		Yousuf Youhana 41 (73); Glenn McGrath 5–49 (9.3 overs)

Australia won by 152 runs
Sydney Cricket Ground
Umpires: Steve Davis & Peter Parker
Player of the match: (Australia) Ricky Ponting
Attendance: 38,123

- Australia won the toss and elected to bat
