= Vince Wells =

English cricketer (born 1965)

Personal information
- Full name: Vincent John Wells
- Born: 6 August 1965 (age 61); Dartford, Kent
- Batting: Right-handed
- Bowling: Right-arm medium

International information
- National side: England
- ODI debut (cap 153): 10 January 1999 v Australia
- Last ODI: 12 April 1999 v Pakistan

Domestic team information
- Years: Team
- 1987–1991: Kent
- 1992–2002: Leicestershire
- 2003: Durham

Career statistics
Competition	ODI	FC	LA	T20
Matches	9	196	267	4
Runs scored	141	9,314	5,722	63
Batting average	20.14	32.79	25.54	15.75
100s/50s	0/0	18/46	4/27	0/0
Top score	39	224	201	23
Balls bowled	220	16,153	9,137	96
Wickets	8	302	250	6
Bowling average	23.62	26.22	27.04	22.83
5 wickets in innings	0	5	3	0
10 wickets in match	0	0	0	0
Best bowling	3/30	5/18	6/20	3/39
Catches/stumpings	7/–	134/–	77/–	2/–
- Source: CricInfo, 6 June 2020

Vincent John Wells (born 6 August 1965) is an English former professional cricketer. He played nine Limited Overs Internationals for the England cricket team during January–April 1999 and was a member of the squad for the 1999 Cricket World Cup. A career highlight was an all-round performance in the first final of the Carlton & United Series against Australia, when Wells took three top-order wickets and then scored a quick, stroke-filled 33.

In county cricket, Wells played for Kent (1987–1991), Leicestershire (1992–2002) and Durham (2003). He retired from all forms of the game in 2004 for a "business opportunity [that] is too good to turn down".
