= E. K. G. Wijewardene =

Sri Lankan cricket umpire (born 1940)

Personal information
- Born: 9 September 1940 (age 86); Colombo, Sri Lanka

Umpiring information
- ODIs umpired: 1 (1999)
- Source: Cricinfo, 31 May 2014

Ella Kapuge Gladwin Wijewardene (born 9 September 1940) is a former Sri Lankan cricket umpire. He stood in one ODI game in 1999.

== See also ==
- List of One Day International cricket umpires
