= Mark N. Atkinson =

Australian cricketer

Mark Atkinson
Personal information
- Full name: Mark Neville Atkinson
- Born: 11 February 1969 (age 57); Sydney, New South Wales, Australia
- Batting: Right-handed
- Role: Wicket-keeper

Domestic team information
- Years: Team
- 1992–2000: Tasmania
- First-class debut: 9 February 1992 Tasmania v Pakistan
- Last First-class: 9 March 2000 Tasmania v Victoria
- List A debut: 24 October 1992 Tasmania v South Australia
- Last List A: 12 February 2000 Tasmania v Western Australia

Career statistics
Competition	First-class	List A
Matches	95	42
Runs scored	2735	416
Batting average	31.80	21.89
100s/50s	0/9	0/1
Top score	76*	58*
Balls bowled	24	–
Wickets	0	–
Bowling average	–	–
5 wickets in innings	0	–
10 wickets in match	0	–
Best bowling	0/1	–
Catches/stumpings	261/29	51/11
- Source: CricketArchive, 21 September 2011

Mark Neville Atkinson (born 11 February 1969, in Sydney, New South Wales) is a former Australian cricket player, who played for Tasmania. He played for the Tigers from 1990 until 2000, and was a regular feature in both their first class and one-day sides.

Mark Atkinson is a current cricket coach and former first-class player, representing Tasmania, the Prime Ministers XI and Australia 'A' teams in a successful 10-year career throughout the 1990s and early 2000s.

Atkinson was a cornerstone player in the era for Tasmanian and Australian cricket, serving as the Tigers' wicketkeeper-batsman throughout. In a team that featured record-breaking players like Ricky Ponting, Colin Miller, Dene Hills, Jamie Cox and Michael DiVenuto, Atkinson's first-class record rendered him unlucky not to receive full Test honours. Nevertheless, Atkinson maintained a reputation as an outstanding gloveman and consistent batsman and went on to play in multiple Sheffield Shield finals. He currently holds the record for the most dismissals by a Tasmanian wicketkeeper.

Through both playing and now coaching, Atkinson's involvement in cricket spans from grassroots through to the elite level. Today, he is founder and Managing Director of Elite Cricket, a cricket coaching venture that services players of all skill-levels in Sydney and its surrounds. His insight and coaching methods have seen him sought out for private sessions with current and former Test cricketers and professionals alike.

== See also ==
- List of Tasmanian representative cricketers
