= Tony McQuillan =

Australian cricket umpire (born 1951)

Personal information
- Full name: Anthony John McQuillan
- Born: 19 March 1951 (age 75); Janolma, Greenslopes, Queensland, Australia
- Role: Umpire

Umpiring information
- Tests umpired: 1 (1993)
- ODIs umpired: 14 (1993–1999)
- WTests umpired: 1 (1993)
- Source: Cricinfo, 12 July 2013

Anthony John McQuillan (born 19 March 1951 in Greenslopes, Queensland) is a former Australian Test cricket umpire from Queensland.

He umpired one Test match in 1993 between Australia and New Zealand at Perth on 12 November to 16 November 1993, a match drawn through Australia's "unaccountable dithering". McQuillan's partner was Darrell Hair.

McQuillan umpired 14 One Day International (ODI) matches between 1993 and 1999. Altogether, he umpired 54 first-class matches between 1989 and 2001.

Before he began umpiring, McQuillan played in the Brisbane grade cricket competition for Easts, Colts and Wynnum-Manly.

== See also ==
- List of Test cricket umpires
- List of One Day International cricket umpires
