= Mark Dekker =

Zimbabwean cricketer

Personal information
- Full name: Mark Hamilton Dekker
- Born: 5 December 1969 (age 56); Gatooma, Rhodesia
- Batting: Left-handed
- Bowling: Left-arm medium, Slow left-arm orthodox

International information
- National side: Zimbabwe (1992–1996)
- Test debut: 1 December 1993 v Pakistan
- Last Test: 26 December 1996 v England
- ODI debut: 31 October 1992 v New Zealand
- Last ODI: 3 November 1996 v Pakistan

Domestic team information
- Years: Team
- 1991–1998: Matabeleland

Career statistics
Competition	Test	ODI	FC	LA
Matches	14	23	43	41
Runs scored	333	379	1,761	756
Batting average	15.85	18.95	25.89	21.00
100s/50s	0/2	0/2	2/10	1/4
Top score	68*	79	162*	113
Balls bowled	60	347	1,750	706
Wickets	0	9	15	18
Bowling average	–	32.22	57.46	34.83
5 wickets in innings	–	0	0	0
10 wickets in match	–	0	0	0
Best bowling	–	2/16	2/4	2/16
Catches/stumpings	12/–	5/–	41/–	9/–
- Source: CricInfo, 3 February 2018

Mark Hamilton Dekker (born 5 December 1969) is a Rhodesian born former Zimbabwean international cricketer. He played 14 Test matches and 23 One Day Internationals for Zimbabwe in the 1990s. In December 2018 Dekker was appointed to be the head coach of Kent Women in England before taking a coaching role with the Kent County Cricket Club Academy the following year.

== Early life ==
Dekker was born at Gatooma in Mashonaland in what was then Rhodesia in 1969, his family having previously lived in South Africa. He grew up in Bulawayo and was educated at Christian Brothers College where he first played regular cricket. He played for the Zimbabwe under-15 team and for Zimbabwe schools.

== Cricket career ==
After leaving school Dekker played in England for Central Lancashire Cricket League side Crompton Cricket Club in 1988 and 1989 and by 1990 was playing in Zimbabwe for Old Miltonians and Matabeleland before the province was given first-class cricket status. He played for Young Zimbabwe against Pakistan B in a match later given declared first-class and in other matches against other touring teams and "scoring plenty of runs in domestic cricket" as an opening batsman when he was "surprised" to be included for the Zimbabwe national team to play a One Day International (ODI) against New Zealand in October 1992.

A Test call up followed in December 1993 and Dekker went on to play 14 Test matches and 23 ODIs for Zimbabwe, his final international appearances coming at the end of 1996. He was the first batsman in Zimbabwe's history to carry his bat through a completed Test innings, scoring 68 not out against Pakistan at Rawalpindi in 1993.

After retirement Dekker coached cricket at Tonbridge School in Kent, England. In 2017 he was appointed as a Community Cricket Officer at Kent County Cricket Club and in December 2018 became the head coach of Kent Women. After leading the women's side to the Women's County Championship title in 2019, Dekker took up a coaching role with the Kent Academy, working alongside Head of Talent Pathway and former Second XI coach Min Patel.
