= Stuart Law =

Australian cricketer

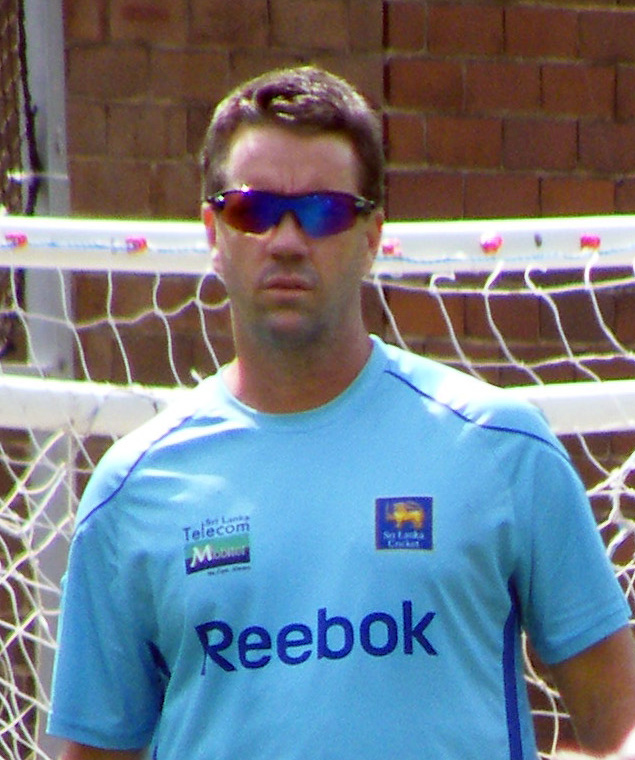
- Stuart Law in October 2010

Personal information
- Full name: Stuart Grant Law
- Born: 18 October 1968 (age 58); Herston, Queensland, Australia
- Batting: Right-handed
- Bowling: Right-arm medium, leg spin
- Role: Cricket Coach

International information
- National side: Australia (1994–1999)
- Only Test (cap 365): 8 December 1995 v Sri Lanka
- ODI debut (cap 121): 2 December 1994 v Zimbabwe
- Last ODI: 13 February 1999 v England

Domestic team information
- Years: Team
- 1988/89–2003/04: Queensland
- 1996–2001: Essex
- 2002–2008: Lancashire
- 2009: Derbyshire

Head coaching information
- Years: Team
- 2011: Sri Lanka
- 2011–2012: Bangladesh
- 2018–2019: West Indies
- 2022: Afghanistan
- 2022–2024: Bangladesh U19
- 2024: United States
- 2025–: Nepal

Career statistics
Competition	Test	ODI	FC	LA
Matches	1	54	367	392
Runs scored	54	1,237	27,080	11,812
Batting average	–	26.89	50.52	34.43
100s/50s	0/1	1/7	79/128	20/64
Top score	54*	110	263	163
Balls bowled	18	807	8,433	3,855
Wickets	0	12	83	90
Bowling average	–	52.91	51.03	35.17
5 wickets in innings	–	0	1	1
10 wickets in match	–	0	0	0
Best bowling	–	2/22	5/39	5/26
Catches/stumpings	1/–	12/–	407/–	154/–
Medal record
Men's Cricket
Representing Australia
ICC Cricket World Cup
Runner-up	1996 India-Pakistan-Sri Lanka
- Source: ESPNcricinfo.com, 27 July 2009

Stuart Grant Law OAM (born 18 October 1968) is an Australian-born cricket coach and former cricketer. He is the current head coach of Nepal National Cricket Team. He was a part of the Australian squad which finished as runners-up at the 1996 Cricket World Cup.

He played one Test and 54 One Day Internationals (ODIs) for Australia. Law also captained Queensland to five Sheffield Shield titles and two one day trophies, making him the most successful captain in Australian domestic cricket; he is also Queensland's all-time leading run scorer in first-class cricket.

He is also a cricket coach, who has coached Sri Lanka (2011), Bangladesh (2011–2012), West Indies (2018–2019), Middlesex (2019–2021) and Nepal (2025–present)

== Early life ==
Law was born and raised in Brisbane, Queensland, Australia. He attended Craigslea State High School.

== Domestic career ==
After a couple of seasons with the Australian youth team, Law made his first-class debut for Queensland in the 1988/89 Sheffield Shield, scoring 179 in his second match. In 1990/91, he had a superb season, with a batting average over 75 and scoring more than 1,200 runs.

In 1996, Law made his English County Championship debut, with Essex, and such was his success in England that he averaged over 55 in all but one of his six seasons at the county, making his career-best score of 263 in 1999. However, disagreements within the club led him to leave for Lancashire for 2002.

During his first season with Lancashire, Law was awarded his county cap. Apart from an enforced absence through injury for part of the 2004 season, Law continued to pile up the runs for his new team, scoring 1,820 in 2003 at an exceptional average of 91, and after hitting 1,277 championship runs in 2007, signed a new one-year deal with the club. Following Mark Chilton's resignation as captain at the end of the 2007 season, Law was appointed Lancashire captain ahead of players such as Dominic Cork, Glen Chapple and Luke Sutton. He was released in October 2008 to be replaced by Glen Chapple as captain for the 2009 season, before signing a contract to play for Derbyshire in limited overs cricket in 2009.

Law has represented the Chennai Superstars in the Indian Cricket League as their captain.

== International career ==
Law made his debut for Australia in a one day international in 1994, and captained Young Australia in England the following summer. In total, Law played 54 one day matches for Australia between 1994 and 1999, including the 1996 World Cup. He batted mainly in the middle order, and took 12 wickets with a mix of medium pace and leg spin bowling.

In December 1995, he played his only Test match, the opening match of a home series against Sri Lanka. Playing in place of the injured Steve Waugh, Law scored 54 not out. Law was dropped when Waugh returned for the following match.

== Honours ==
Law was selected as one of the five Wisden Cricketers of the Year in 1998. In 2007, he was awarded the Medal of the Order of Australia.

== Coaching career ==
Law was appointed as Sri Lanka's assistant coach in October 2009. He was then head coach in 2011–2012 of Bangladesh Cricket when Trevor Bayliss left shortly after the 2011 World Cup. The Pakistan Cricket Team was trying to make him their coach but Mickey Arthur was announced the head coach instead. On 27 January 2017, Stuart Law was appointed as the head coach of West Indies Cricket team on a two-year contract, starting on 15 February 2018 .

He also coached Middlesex (2019–2021).

In February 2022, Law was named interim head coach of Afghanistan. In June 2022, he was appointed head coach of the Bangladesh national under-19 cricket team.

In April 2024, Law was appointed as the new head coach of the United States national cricket team. On 26 October 2024, Law was terminated as head coach.

On 28 March 2025, Law was appointed as the head coach of Nepal national cricket team for the next two years.

== See also ==
- One Test Wonder

Sporting positions
Preceded by Ian Healy	Queensland ING Cup captain 1999/00–2002/03	Succeeded by Jimmy Maher
Preceded by Ian Healy	Queensland Sheffield Shield captain 1999/2000–2002/03	Succeeded by Jimmy Maher
Preceded by Mark Chilton	Lancashire captain 2008	Succeeded by Glen Chapple
Preceded by Richard Scott	Middlesex coach 2019–2021	Succeeded by Richard Johnson
