= Ravindra Pushpakumara =

Sri Lankan cricketer (born 1975)

Deshabandu Ravindra Pushpakumara
Personal information
- Full name: Karuppiahyage Ravindra Pushpakumara
- Born: 21 July 1975 (age 51); Panadura, Sri Lanka
- Batting: Right-handed
- Bowling: Right-arm fast-medium
- Role: Bowler

International information
- National side: Sri Lanka (1994–2001)
- Test debut (cap 61): 26 August 1994 v Pakistan
- Last Test: 6 September 2001 v Bangladesh
- ODI debut (cap 77): 18 February 1994 v India
- Last ODI: 19 December 1999 v Zimbabwe

Domestic team information
- Years: Team
- Colombo Cricket Club
- Colts Cricket Club
- Nondescripts Cricket Club

Career statistics
Competition	Test	ODI
Matches	23	31
Runs scored	166	36
Batting average	8.73	9.00
100s/50s	0/0	0/0
Top score	44	14*
Balls bowled	3,792	1,430
Wickets	58	24
Bowling average	38.65	49.20
5 wickets in innings	4	0
10 wickets in match	0	0
Best bowling	7/116	3/25
Catches/stumpings	10/–	8/–
Medal record
Men's Cricket
Representing Sri Lanka
ICC Cricket World Cup
Winner	1996 India-Pakistan-Sri Lanka
- Source: ESPNcricinfo, 9 February 2006

Deshabandu Karuppiahyage Ravindra Pushpakumara (born 21 July 1975), or Ravindra Pushpakumara, is a former Sri Lankan cricketer of Tamil - Sinhalese mixed ancestry. He is a right-handed batsman and a right-arm medium-fast bowler. He was a key member of Sri Lanka's 1996 Cricket World Cup winning team.

== Early and domestic career ==
Pushpakumara was educated at St. John's College Panadura. He made his Twenty20 debut on 17 August 2004, for Nondescripts Cricket Club in the 2004 SLC Twenty20 Tournament.

== International career ==
Having impressed with Sri Lanka's Under-19s side, Pushpakumara made his Test debut in August 1994 against Pakistan, where he was noted as the fastest bowler Sri Lanka had for many years.

Despite his pace, his variation on duller pitches was lacking, and thus he failed to get into the Sri Lankan side on a regular basis. His best bowling figures in a Test innings are 7/116 which he made against Zimbabwe at Harare Sports Club in 1994/95. Pushpakumara could be viewed as another fast bowling prospect which failed to live up to expectation from Sri Lanka. Some started to call him "Wild Johnny" for his wayward lines he came up with more often than not. Pushpakumara's last Test was against Bangladesh in the Asian Test Championship. Since 2004 he has played Twenty-20 cricket.
