= Nuwan Zoysa =

Sri Lankan cricketer (born 1978)

Personal information
- Full name: Demuni Nuwan Tharanga Zoysa
- Born: 13 May 1978 (age 48); Colombo, Sri Lanka
- Nickname: Zippy
- Height: 6 ft 5 in (1.96 m)
- Batting: Left-handed
- Bowling: Left-arm fast-medium
- Role: Bowler

International information
- National side: Sri Lanka (1997–2007)
- Test debut (cap 66): 7 March 1997 v New Zealand
- Last Test: 9 July 2004 v Australia
- ODI debut (cap 88): 25 March 1997 v New Zealand
- Last ODI: 8 February 2007 v India

Domestic team information
- Years: Team
- 1996/97-2010/11: Sinhalese Sports Club
- 2007/08: Deccan Chargers
- 2008/09-2009/10: Basnahira South

Career statistics
| Competition | Test | ODI | FC | LA |
|---|---|---|---|---|
| Matches | 30 | 95 | 118 | 187 |
| Runs scored | 288 | 343 | 2,065 | 1,320 |
| Batting average | 8.47 | 13.19 | 9.07 | 16.29 |
| 100s/50s | 0/0 | 0/0 | 1/5 | 0/3 |
| Top score | 28* | 47* | 114 | 53 |
| Balls bowled | 4,422 | 4,259 | 14,905 | 8,419 |
| Wickets | 64 | 108 | 301 | 242 |
| Bowling average | 33.70 | 29.75 | 23.77 | 25.22 |
| 5 wickets in innings | 1 | 1 | 7 | 2 |
| 10 wickets in match | 0 | 0 | 0 | 0 |
| Best bowling | 5/20 | 5/26 | 7/58 | 6/14 |
| Catches/stumpings | 4/– | 13/– | 20/– | 26/– |
- Source: ESPNcricinfo, 16 September 2015

Demuni Nuwan Tharanga Zoysa (born 13 May 1978), or Nuwan Zoysa, is a former Sri Lankan cricketer. He was a tall left-arm seam bowler, who played 30 Tests and 95 One Day Internationals (ODIs) for Sri Lanka. Nuwan was educated at Isipathana College, Colombo.

In his eighth Test, Zoysa became the first player in history to take a hat-trick off his first three balls of a Test match. He achieved this against Zimbabwe at Harare in November 1999, dismissing Trevor Gripper, Murray Goodwin and Neil Johnson.

== International career ==
Zoysa made his first-class debut in 1996/97 and during his first season he took his career best figures of 7 for 58, playing for Sinhalese Sports Club. He made his Test debut soon after in Dunedin against New Zealand. He took over 100 ODI wickets for Sri Lanka, becoming the eighth to have achieved the milestone in the 2004 Champions Trophy.

An aggressive lower order batsman, Zoysa once won an ODI against Australia with an unbeaten 47, his highest ODI score. Zoysa's peak in international cricket came during the 2004 season when he took his best Test and ODI figures and only five-wicket hauls. In May, he took 5 for 20 against Zimbabwe in the first Test at Harare and in August he claimed 5 for 26 in an ODI against South Africa in Colombo.

== Domestic career ==
He made his Twenty20 debut on 17 August 2004, for Sinhalese Sports Club in the 2004 SLC Twenty20 Tournament. He was also bought by the Deccan Chargers Franchise in the IPL but he was removed from the team for his poor performances.

== Coaching ==
Nuwan Zoysa was appointed to the National Fast Bowling Coaching Department of Sri Lanka Cricket on 1 October 2015 prior to which he has worked in India with Goa Cricket Association and with Royal College & Nondiscripts as Fast Bowling Coach before joining SLC.

In October 2018, he was charged by the International Cricket Council (ICC) for three breaches of the ICC Anti-Corruption Code. In November 2020, he was found guilty of three offences, and in April 2021, he was handed a six-year ban, backdated to 31 October 2018.
