= Peter Parker (umpire) =

Australian cricket umpire (born 1959)

Personal information
- Full name: Peter Douglas Parker
- Born: 20 July 1959 (age 67); Herston, Queensland, Australia

Umpiring information
- Tests umpired: 10 (1993–2008)
- ODIs umpired: 65 (1993–2008)
- T20Is umpired: 2 (2007)
- WODIs umpired: 6 (1993–2000)
- Source: ESPNcricinfo, 10 April 2022

Peter Douglas Parker (born 20 July 1959) is an Australian Test cricket match umpire and former cricketer. He was a member of the International Panel of ICC Umpires between 2003 and 2008.

== Playing career ==
Parker played junior representative cricket for Queensland before playing in Brisbane Grade Cricket. He gave up playing when he broke his thumb twice in a season.

== Umpiring career ==
He umpired ten Test matches between 1993 and 2008. His first match was between Australia and New Zealand at Brisbane on 3 December to 7 December 1993, won by Australia by an innings and 96 runs, with Allan Border and Steve Waugh scoring centuries, and Shane Warne and Craig McDermott taking 8 and 6 wickets respectively. Parker's partner was Steve Randell.

Parker's last Test match in Australia was between Australia and the West Indies at Perth on 1 December to 3 December 2000, won by Australia by an innings and 27 runs with Mark Waugh scoring a century, and wickets being shared by Glenn McGrath (who took a hat-trick), Brett Lee, Jason Gillespie and Stuart MacGill. Parker's partner was the English umpire John Hampshire. Parker retired to focus on his career away from the game in October 2008.

== See also ==
- List of Test cricket umpires
- List of One Day International cricket umpires
- List of Twenty20 International cricket umpires
