= Pramodya Wickramasinghe =

Sri Lankan cricketer

Personal information
- Full name: Gallage Pramodya Wickramasinghe
- Born: August 14, 1971 (age 55); Matara, Ceylon
- Nickname: Wicky
- Batting: Right-handed
- Bowling: Right-arm fast
- Role: Bowler

International information
- National side: Sri Lanka (1990–2002)
- Test debut (cap 51): 12 December 1991 v Pakistan
- Last Test: 20 January 2001 v South Africa
- ODI debut (cap 64): 31 December 1990 v Bangladesh
- Last ODI: 7 July 2002 v England

Career statistics
Competition	Test	ODI
Matches	40	134
Runs scored	555	344
Batting average	9.40	8.59
100s/50s	0/1	0/0
Top score	51	32
Balls bowled	7,260	5,720
Wickets	85	109
Bowling average	41.87	39.64
5 wickets in innings	3	0
10 wickets in match	0	0
Best bowling	6/60	4/48
Catches/stumpings	18/–	26/–
Medal record
Men's Cricket
Representing Sri Lanka
ICC Cricket World Cup
Winner	1996 India-Pakistan-Sri Lanka
- Source: ESPNcricinfo, 9 February 2017

Wickramasinghe Gallage Pramodya (born August 14, 1971), commonly known as Pramodya Wickramasinghe, is a former Sri Lankan cricketer. He was a right-handed batsman and a right-arm-fast bowler. He was a member of 1996 Cricket World Cup winning team. He is the former national chief selector of both Sri Lanka men's and women's cricket teams.

== Domestic career ==
Gentle in pace, but deadly in accuracy, he played for Sinhalese Sports Club in club cricket competitions. He made his first-class debut in 1988 playing for Sinhalese Sports Club. He became internationally known in 1989 after the Youth Asia Cup Championship, and toured England with the Sri Lanka B team in 1991. In November that year, he became the first bowler in Sri Lankan domestic cricket to take all ten wickets in a single innings, finishing with 10 for 41 against Kalutara Physical Culture Club in Colombo.

== International career ==
Pramodya made his ODI debut on 31 December 1990 at the 1990–91 Asia Cup against Bangladesh. He made his test debut on 12 December 1991 against Pakistan. He played a key role in Sri Lanka's first ever three match test series win in away condition during the tour of Pakistan in 1995-96. During the series he picked up eight wickets as Sri Lanka defeated Pakistan 2–1 to secure their first test series win against Pakistan in Pakistan.

He represented Sri Lanka in the 1992, 1996 and 1999 World Cup tournaments. However, he could not make any major impact during the 1996 Wills Cricket World Cup and ended the tournament without taking a wicket. He was also a member of the Sri Lankan team during the inaugural edition of the ICC Men's Champions Trophy in 1998 where Sri Lanka reached semifinals. He took his 100th ODI wicket in an ODI against Zimbabwe in 1999 by dismissing Andy Flower.

Though playing steadily from then on until 2000, he found himself in need of a shoulder operation in Australia in 2000 which more-or-less ended his career, as from then on he found it difficult to find a place for himself within the side. He made a comeback return to national team in 2002 during the 2002 NatWest Series after a gap of two years following his recovery from shoulder operation. However, he struggled against England and India during the NatWest Series and was dropped from the team permanently.

== Chief selector ==
He became the President of Sri Lanka Cricket Association and later joined the Sri Lankan national selection committee in 2004 which was headed by Ashantha de Mel. He was also included in the newly appointed selection panel headed by Sanath Jayasuriya in 2013. In December 2020, he was also included in the seven member selection panel led by Ashantha de Mel. On 8 April 2021, he was appointed as the chairman of national selection committee by the Sri Lanka Cricket on the recommendation of sports minister Namal Rajapaksa replacing Ashantha de Mel.

== Controversies ==
In 2017, he was reported to have made corruption and match fixing allegations against some of the national cricketers such as Upul Tharanga and Dinesh Chandimal following the ODI series defeat against Zimbabwe at home. However, Pramodya insisted that he had not made such allegations against the cricketers and he clarified that he blamed only the team selection strategy. The Criminal Investigation Department also inquired the defamation petition signed by 40 national cricketers against Pramodya over his remarks. In addition, the International Cricket Council also conducted a corruption investigation based on the claims of Pramodya.

After becoming the chairman of national selection committee in April 2021, he controversially sacked senior players from the national team in limited overs international matches with the intention of grooming youngsters targeting the 2023 Cricket World Cup. Following the implementation of his youth policy, senior cricketers Angelo Mathews and Thisara Perera threatened to quit international cricket. However, his move was backfired with horrendous performances by the national team in the tours of Bangladesh and England.
