= Darrell Hair =

Australian cricket umpire (born 1952)

Personal information
- Full name: Darrell Bruce Hair
- Born: 30 September 1952 (age 74); Mudgee, New South Wales, Australia

Umpiring information
- Tests umpired: 78 (1992–2008)
- ODIs umpired: 141 (1991–2008)
- T20Is umpired: 6 (2008–2008)
- Source: ESPNcricinfo, 28 September 2012

Darrell Bruce Hair (born 30 September 1952) is an Australian former Test match cricket umpire, from New South Wales. He was on the International panel of umpires from 2002 to 2003, before he, along with fellow Australian Simon Taufel, and New Zealander Billy Bowden, was appointed to the ICC Elite umpire panel. After an ICC board meeting discussed his actions in a Test match between Pakistan and England in 2006 it was decided he should not umpire matches involving the Test playing nations. He was restored to the Elite Panel by the ICC on 12 March 2008 and stood in the England v New Zealand Tests at Old Trafford in May and Trent Bridge in June 2008.

== Career ==
At the local level, Hair began his career playing cricket in Orange and Molong. He moved to Sydney in 1972 where he played with the Mosman and North Sydney clubs in the Sydney Grade Cricket competition, as a right-arm fast-medium bowler.

Hair stood in his first Test match in January 1992, between Australia and India in Adelaide. In 1994 the International Cricket Council (ICC) introduced a policy of appointing one umpire to each Test match from a non-participating country, and since 2002 both umpires have been appointed from non-participating nations. After 2002, the majority of Hair's Test matches were played outside Australia and did not involve Australia, he also was the umpire for the test match between the West Indies and England in which Brian Lara scored 400 not out. His last Test match involving Australia was against South Africa at Melbourne on 26 to 29 December 2001. Hair's on-field colleague was West Indian umpire Eddie Nicholls.

In a 1995 match between Australia and Sri Lanka in Melbourne, he no-balled Muttiah Muralitharan seven times in three overs for throwing. It was the first time Muralitharan had been called in 22 Tests, although the ICC later said that umpires had expressed doubts about his legitimacy for more than two years. In Tests, Muralitharan was found to exceed the then 5 degree limit for spin bowlers, but his unusual action was found to be partially the result of a congenital elbow deformity and after further review, the ICC raised the elbow extension limit to 15 degrees for all bowlers. In 1999 Hair was found guilty by the ICC of bringing the game into disrepute after he described Muralitharan's action as "diabolical". Hair later received death threats that referenced the throwing incident and as a result the ICC decreed that he would not officiate any of Sri Lanka's matches at the 1999 World Cup.

== 2006 ball tampering incident ==
On the fourth day of the fourth Test between England and Pakistan at The Oval, Hair and fellow umpire Billy Doctrove ruled that the Pakistani team had been involved in ball tampering. They awarded five penalty runs to England and offered them a replacement ball. In protest the Pakistani players refused to take the field after the tea break. After 30 minutes the umpires removed the bails, declared England winners by forfeiture. The Pakistani team took the field 25 minutes later, but the umpires stated that the game had ended the moment the bails were removed. The Test was abandoned and the match was awarded to England. The ICC, ECB and PCB later affirmed that the decision to award the match to England was in accordance with the Laws of Cricket. Inzamam-ul-Haq was acquitted of ball tampering, but punished for the events leading up to the forfeit.

After the ensuing controversy Hair wrote an e-mail to the ICC saying that he would resign from the ICC Elite Umpire Panel in return for a non-negotiable one-off payment of US$500,000 directly into his bank account to cover the loss of future earnings. Hair subsequently revoked the offer said that he never considered retirement. The ICC announced that Hair would not be umpiring at the 2006 ICC Champions Trophy due to security concerns and on 4 November 2006, Hair was banned from officiating in international matches by the ICC following a two-day meeting. A leaked ICC report showed that before the Oval incident, Hair was ranked the second-best umpire overall and number one in decision-making.

In February 2007 Hair announced he was suing the ICC and the Pakistan Cricket Board on grounds of racial discrimination, saying he was made a scapegoat as no action was taken against Billy Doctrove. On 9 October 2007, Hair dropped his discrimination case. The ICC said Hair would undergo a development programme over the next six months seemingly with the goal to place him back into top level matches. During this six-month period, he continued to officiate in second tier ICC associate matches. The ICC restored Hair to the Elite Umpiring Panel on 12 March 2008. On 22 August 2008 Hair handed in his resignation to the ICC in order to take up a coaching role. He had been an international umpire for 16 years.

== Legal issues ==
On 23 October 2017, Hair pleaded guilty to one charge of embezzlement and one charge of stealing in the Orange Local Court. The offences were committed as a result of a gambling addiction, for which Hair had subsequently sought professional counselling, and involved a total of Au$9005.75 (AUD). Given his early guilty plea, in addition to the fact that he had repaid the stolen money, Hair was sentenced to an 18-month good behaviour bond with no conviction recorded.

== See also ==
- List of Test cricket umpires
- List of One Day International cricket umpires
- List of Twenty20 International cricket umpires

== Bibliography ==
- Hair, Darrell (1998) Decision Maker: An Umpire's Story Random House, Australia. ISBN 0-09-183731-6
- Hair, Darrell (2011) In The Best Interests Of The Game Harper Sports. ISBN 9780732292881
