= List of Sri Lanka national cricket captains =

This is a list of all men, boys and women who have captained a Sri Lankan national cricket team at official international level. Sri Lanka became a full member of the International Cricket Council on 21 July 1981. Previously they were an associate member of the ICC from 1965, which made them eligible to compete in the ICC Trophy, the leading one-day tournament for associate members. Just after Sri Lanka gained Test status in 1981 a team of rebel players toured apartheid South Africa under the banner "Arosa Sri Lanka" (the term "Arosa" being derived from the promoter's name). All players who toured Sri Lanka were banned from official cricket matches for life, thereby setting Sri Lanka's development back. Sri Lanka's greatest success in One Day Internationals was when they won the Cricket World Cup in 1996 under the captaincy of Arjuna Ranatunga.

== Men's cricket ==
=== Test match captains ===
This is a list of cricketers who have captained the Sri Lankan cricket team for at least one Test match. The table of results is complete including the first Test against Bangladesh which ended on 4 February 2018. Where a player has a dagger (†) next to a Test match series in which he captained at least one Test, that denotes that player captained this side for a minor proportion in a series.

Sri Lankan Test match captains
Number	Name	Year	Opposition	Location	Played	Won	Lost	Drawn	W%
1	Bandula Warnapura	1981/82	England	Sri Lanka	1	0	1	0	0%
1	Bandula Warnapura	1981/82	Pakistan	Pakistan	2	0	2	0	0%
1	Bandula Warnapura	1982/83	India	India	1	0	0	1	0%
1	Bandula Warnapura	Total			4	0	3	1	0%
2	Duleep Mendis	1981/82†	Pakistan	Pakistan	1	0	0	1	0%
2	Duleep Mendis	1982/83	Australia	Sri Lanka	1	0	1	0	0%
2	Duleep Mendis	1983/84	New Zealand	Sri Lanka	3	0	2	1	0%
2	Duleep Mendis	1984	England	England	1	0	0	1	0%
2	Duleep Mendis	1985	India	Sri Lanka	3	1	0	2	33%
2	Duleep Mendis	1985/86	Pakistan	Pakistan	3	0	2	1	0%
2	Duleep Mendis	1985/86	Pakistan	Sri Lanka	3	1	1	1	33%
2	Duleep Mendis	1986/87	India	India	3	0	2	1	0%
2	Duleep Mendis	1986/87	New Zealand	Sri Lanka	1	0	0	1	0%
2	Duleep Mendis	Total			19	2	8	9	10.53%
3	Somachandra de Silva	1982/83	New Zealand	New Zealand	2	0	2	0	0%
3	Somachandra de Silva	Total			2	0	2	0	0%
4	Ranjan Madugalle	1987/88	Australia	Australia	1	0	1	0	0%
4	Ranjan Madugalle	1988	England	England	1	0	1	0	0%
4	Ranjan Madugalle	Total			2	0	2	0	0%
5	Arjuna Ranatunga								
5	Arjuna Ranatunga	1989/90	Australia	Australia	2	0	1	1	0%
5	Arjuna Ranatunga	1990/91	India	India	1	0	1	0	0%
5	Arjuna Ranatunga	1990/91	New Zealand	New Zealand	3	0	0	3	0%
5	Arjuna Ranatunga	1992	Australia	Sri Lanka	3	0	1	2	0%
5	Arjuna Ranatunga	1992/93	New Zealand	Sri Lanka	2	1	0	1	50%
5	Arjuna Ranatunga	1992/93	England	Sri Lanka	1	1	0	0	100%
5	Arjuna Ranatunga	1993	India	Sri Lanka	3	0	1	2	0%
5	Arjuna Ranatunga	1993	South Africa	Sri Lanka	3	0	1	2	0%
5	Arjuna Ranatunga	1993/94	West Indies	Sri Lanka	1	0	0	1	0%
5	Arjuna Ranatunga	1993/94	India	India	3	0	3	0	0%
5	Arjuna Ranatunga	1994	Pakistan	Sri Lanka	2	0	2	0	0%
5	Arjuna Ranatunga	1994/95	Zimbabwe	Zimbabwe	3	0	0	3	0%
5	Arjuna Ranatunga	1994/95	New Zealand	New Zealand	2	1	0	1	50%
5	Arjuna Ranatunga	1995/96	Pakistan	Pakistan	3	2	1	0	66.67%
5	Arjuna Ranatunga	1995/96	Australia	Australia	2	0	2	0	0%
5	Arjuna Ranatunga	1996/97	Zimbabwe	Sri Lanka	2	2	0	0	100%
5	Arjuna Ranatunga	1996/97	New Zealand	New Zealand	2	0	2	0	0%
5	Arjuna Ranatunga	1996/97	Pakistan	Sri Lanka	2	0	0	2	0%
5	Arjuna Ranatunga	1997	West Indies	West Indies	2	0	1	1	0%
5	Arjuna Ranatunga	1997	India	Sri Lanka	2	0	0	2	0%
5	Arjuna Ranatunga	1997/98	India	India	3	0	0	3	0%
5	Arjuna Ranatunga	1997/98	Zimbabwe	Sri Lanka	2	2	0	0	100%
5	Arjuna Ranatunga	1997/98	South Africa	South Africa	2	0	2	0	0%
5	Arjuna Ranatunga	1998	New Zealand	Sri Lanka	3	2	1	0	66.67%
5	Arjuna Ranatunga	1998	England	England	1	1	0	0	100%
5	Arjuna Ranatunga	1998/99	India	Sri Lanka	1	0	0	1	0%
5	Arjuna Ranatunga	Total			56	12	19	25	21.43%
6	Aravinda de Silva	1991	England	England	1	0	1	0	0%
6	Aravinda de Silva	1991/92	Pakistan	Pakistan	3	0	1	2	0%
6	Aravinda de Silva	1995/96†	Australia	Australia	1	0	1	0	0%
6	Aravinda de Silva	1998/99†	Pakistan	Bangladesh	1	0	1	0	0%
6	Aravinda de Silva	Total			6	0	4	2	0%
7	Hashan Tillakaratne	1998/99	Pakistan	Pakistan	1	0	0	1	0%
7	Hashan Tillakaratne	2003	New Zealand	Sri Lanka	2	0	0	2	0%
7	Hashan Tillakaratne	2003	West Indies	West Indies	2	0	1	1	0%
7	Hashan Tillakaratne	2003/04	England	Sri Lanka	3	1	0	2	33.33%
7	Hashan Tillakaratne	2003/04	Australia	Sri Lanka	3	0	3	0	0%
7	Hashan Tillakaratne	Total			11	1	4	6	9%
8	Sanath Jayasuriya	1999	Australia	Sri Lanka	3	1	0	2	33.3%
8	Sanath Jayasuriya	1999/2000	Zimbabwe	Zimbabwe	3	1	0	2	33.33%
8	Sanath Jayasuriya	1999/2000	Pakistan	Pakistan	3	2	1	0	66.67%
8	Sanath Jayasuriya	2000	Pakistan	Sri Lanka	3	0	2	1	0%
8	Sanath Jayasuriya	2000	South Africa	Sri Lanka	3	1	1	1	33.33%
8	Sanath Jayasuriya	2000/01	South Africa	South Africa	3	0	2	1	0%
8	Sanath Jayasuriya	2000/01	England	Sri Lanka	3	1	2	0	33.33%
8	Sanath Jayasuriya	2001	India	Sri Lanka	3	2	1	0	66.67%
8	Sanath Jayasuriya	2001/02	Bangladesh^{1}	Sri Lanka	1	1	0	0	100%
8	Sanath Jayasuriya	2001/02	West Indies	Sri Lanka	3	3	0	0	100%
8	Sanath Jayasuriya	2001/02	Zimbabwe	Sri Lanka	3	3	0	0	100%
8	Sanath Jayasuriya	2001/02	Pakistan²	Pakistan	1	1	0	0	100%
8	Sanath Jayasuriya	2002	England	England	3	0	2	1	0%
8	Sanath Jayasuriya	2002	Bangladesh	Sri Lanka	2	2	0	0	100%
8	Sanath Jayasuriya	2002/03	South Africa	South Africa	1	0	1	0	0%
8	Sanath Jayasuriya	Total			38	18	12	8	47.37%
9	Marvan Atapattu	2002/03†	South Africa	South Africa	1	0	1	0	0%
9	Marvan Atapattu	2004	Zimbabwe	Zimbabwe	2	2	0	0	100%
9	Marvan Atapattu	2004	Australia	Australia	2	0	1	1	0%
9	Marvan Atapattu	2004	South Africa	Sri Lanka	2	1	0	1	50%
9	Marvan Atapattu	2004/05	Pakistan	Pakistan	2	1	1	0	50%
9	Marvan Atapattu	2004/05	New Zealand	New Zealand	2	0	1	1	0%
9	Marvan Atapattu	2005	West Indies	Sri Lanka	2	2	0	0	100%
9	Marvan Atapattu	2005/06	Bangladesh	Sri Lanka	2	2	0	0	100%
9	Marvan Atapattu	2005/06	India	India	3	0	2	1	0%
9	Marvan Atapattu	Total			18	8	6	4	44.44%
10	Mahela Jayawardene	2005/06	Bangladesh	Bangladesh	2	2	0	0	100%
10	Mahela Jayawardene	2005/06	Pakistan	Sri Lanka	2	0	1	1	0%
10	Mahela Jayawardene	2006	England	England	3	1	1	1	33%
10	Mahela Jayawardene	2006	South Africa	Sri Lanka	2	2	0	0	100%
10	Mahela Jayawardene	2006/07	New Zealand	New Zealand	2	1	1	0	50%
10	Mahela Jayawardene	2007	Bangladesh	Sri Lanka	3	3	0	0	100%
10	Mahela Jayawardene	2007/08	Australia	Australia	2	0	2	0	0%
10	Mahela Jayawardene	2007/08	England	Sri Lanka	3	1	0	2	33%
10	Mahela Jayawardene	2007/08	West Indies	West Indies	2	1	1	0	50%
10	Mahela Jayawardene	2008	India	Sri Lanka	3	2	1	0	66%
10	Mahela Jayawardene	2008/09	Bangladesh	Bangladesh	2	2	0	0	100%
10	Mahela Jayawardene	2008/09	Pakistan	Pakistan	2	0	0	2	0%
10	Mahela Jayawardene	2011/12	England	Sri Lanka	2	1	1	0	50%
10	Mahela Jayawardene	2012	Pakistan	Sri Lanka	3	1	0	2	33%
10	Mahela Jayawardene	2012/13	New Zealand	Sri Lanka	2	1	1	0	50%
10	Mahela Jayawardene	2012/13	Australia	Australia	3	0	3	0	0%
10	Mahela Jayawardene	Total			38	18	12	8	47.37%
11	Kumar Sangakkara	2009	Pakistan	Sri Lanka	3	2	0	1	66%
11	Kumar Sangakkara	2009	New Zealand	Sri Lanka	2	2	0	0	100%
11	Kumar Sangakkara	2009/10	India	India	3	0	2	1	0%
11	Kumar Sangakkara	2010	India	Sri Lanka	3	1	1	1	33%
11	Kumar Sangakkara	2010/11	West Indies	Sri Lanka	3	0	0	3	0%
11	Kumar Sangakkara	2011†	England	England	1	0	0	1	0%
11	Kumar Sangakkara	Total			15	5	3	7	33.33%
12	Tillakaratne Dilshan	2011	England	England	2	0	1	1	0%
12	Tillakaratne Dilshan	2011	Australia	Sri Lanka	3	0	1	2	0%
12	Tillakaratne Dilshan	2011/12	Pakistan	United Arab Emirates	3	0	1	2	0%
12	Tillakaratne Dilshan	2011/12	South Africa	South Africa	3	1	2	0	33%
12	Tillakaratne Dilshan	Total			11	1	5	5	9.09%
13	Angelo Mathews	2012/13	Bangladesh	Sri Lanka	2	1	0	1	50%
13	Angelo Mathews	2013/14	Pakistan	United Arab Emirates	3	1	1	1	33%
13	Angelo Mathews	2013/14	Bangladesh	Bangladesh	2	1	0	1	50%
13	Angelo Mathews	2014	England	England	2	1	0	1	50%
13	Angelo Mathews	2014	South Africa	Sri Lanka	2	0	1	1	0%
13	Angelo Mathews	2014	Pakistan	Sri Lanka	2	2	0	0	100%
13	Angelo Mathews	2014/15	New Zealand	New Zealand	2	0	2	0	0%
13	Angelo Mathews	2015	Pakistan	Sri Lanka	3	1	2	0	33%
13	Angelo Mathews	2015	India	Sri Lanka	3	1	2	0	33%
13	Angelo Mathews	2015/16	West Indies	Sri Lanka	2	2	0	0	100%
13	Angelo Mathews	2015/16	New Zealand	New Zealand	2	0	2	0	0%
13	Angelo Mathews	2016	England	England	3	0	2	1	0%
13	Angelo Mathews	2016	Australia	Sri Lanka	3	3	0	0	100%
13	Angelo Mathews	2016/17	South Africa	South Africa	3	0	3	0	0%
13	Angelo Mathews	Total			34	13	15	6	38.24%
14	Rangana Herath	2016/17	Zimbabwe	Zimbabwe	2	2	0	0	100%
14	Rangana Herath	2016/17	Bangladesh	Sri Lanka	2	1	1	0	50%
14	Rangana Herath	2017	India	Sri Lanka	1	0	1	0	0%
14	Rangana Herath	Total			5	3	2	0	60%
15	Dinesh Chandimal	2017	Zimbabwe	Sri Lanka	1	1	0	0	100%
15	Dinesh Chandimal	2017	India	Sri Lanka	2	0	2	0	0%
15	Dinesh Chandimal	2017/18	Pakistan	United Arab Emirates	2	2	0	0	100%
15	Dinesh Chandimal	2017/18	India	India	3	0	1	2	0%
15	Dinesh Chandimal	2017/18	Bangladesh	Bangladesh	2	1	0	1	50%
15	Dinesh Chandimal	2018	West Indies	West Indies	2	0	1	1	0%
15	Dinesh Chandimal	2018/19	England	Sri Lanka	1	0	1	0	0%
15	Dinesh Chandimal	2018/19	New Zealand	New Zealand	2	0	1	1	0%
15	Dinesh Chandimal	2018/19	Australia	Australia	2	0	2	0	0%
15	Dinesh Chandimal	2020/21	England	Sri Lanka	2	0	2	0	0%
15	Dinesh Chandimal	Total			19	4	10	5	21.05%
16	Suranga Lakmal	2018	West Indies	West Indies	1	1	0	0	100%
16	Suranga Lakmal	2018	South Africa	Sri Lanka	2	2	0	0	100%
16	Suranga Lakmal	2018/19	England	Sri Lanka	2	0	2	0	0%
16	Suranga Lakmal	Total			5	3	2	0	60%
17	Dimuth Karunaratne	2018/19	South Africa	South Africa	2	2	0	0	100%
17	Dimuth Karunaratne	2019	New Zealand	Sri Lanka	2	1	1	0	50%
17	Dimuth Karunaratne	2019/20	Pakistan	Pakistan	2	0	1	1	0%
17	Dimuth Karunaratne	2019/20	Zimbabwe	Zimbabwe	2	1	0	1	50%
17	Dimuth Karunaratne	2020/21	South Africa	South Africa	2	0	2	0	0%
17	Dimuth Karunaratne	2020/21	West Indies	West Indies	2	0	0	2	0%
17	Dimuth Karunaratne	2020/21	Bangladesh	Sri Lanka	2	1	0	1	50%
17	Dimuth Karunaratne	2021/22	West Indies	Sri Lanka	2	2	0	0	100%
17	Dimuth Karunaratne	2021/22	India	India	2	0	2	0	0%
17	Dimuth Karunaratne	2022	Bangladesh	Bangladesh	2	1	0	1	50%
17	Dimuth Karunaratne	2022	Australia	Sri Lanka	2	1	1	0	50%
17	Dimuth Karunaratne	2022	Pakistan	Sri Lanka	2	1	1	0	50%
17	Dimuth Karunaratne	2022/23	New Zealand	New Zealand	2	0	2	0	0%
17	Dimuth Karunaratne	2022/23	Ireland	Sri Lanka	2	2	0	0	100%
17	Dimuth Karunaratne	2023	Pakistan	Sri Lanka	2	0	2	0	0%
17	Dimuth Karunaratne	Total			30	12	12	6	41.85%
18	Dhananjaya de Silva	2023/24	Afghanistan	Sri Lanka	1	1	0	0	100%
18	Dhananjaya de Silva	2023/24	Bangladesh	Bangladesh	2	2	0	0	100%
18	Dhananjaya de Silva	2024	England	England	3	1	2	0	33.33%
18	Dhananjaya de Silva	2024/25	New Zealand	Sri Lanka	2	2	0	0	100%
		Total			8	6	2	0	75%
Grand total					321	106	123	92	33.02%

Notes:

- ^{1} Asian Test Championship
- ² Final of the Asian Test Championship

Updated 27 March 2022

=== Men's One-Day International captains ===
This is a list of cricketers who have captained the Sri Lankan cricket team for at least one One Day International. Sri Lanka's greatest success was when they won the 1996 cricket World Cup under the captaincy of Arjuna Ranatunga.

Sri Lankan ODI captains
Number	Name	Year	Played	Won	Lost	NR	Tied	W%
1	Anura Tennekoon	1975–1979	4	0	4	0	0	0%
2	Bandula Warnapura	1979–1982	8	3	5	0	0	37.5%
3	Duleep Mendis	1982–1987	61	11	46	4	0	18.03%
4	Somachandra de Silva	1983	1	0	1	0	0	0%
5	Ranjan Madugalle	1988	13	2	11	0	0	15.38%
6	Arjuna Ranatunga	1988–1999	193	89	95	8	1	46.11%
7	Ravi Ratnayeke	1988	1	1	0	0	0	100%
8	Aravinda de Silva	1992–1996	18	5	12	1	0	27.78%
9	Roshan Mahanama	1994	2	0	2	0	0	0%
10	Sanath Jayasuriya	1998–2003	117	65	47	3	2	55.56%
11	Marvan Atapattu	2001–2006	63	35	27	1	0	55.56%
12	Mahela Jayawardene	2004–2013	126	68	49	8	1	53.97%
13	Chaminda Vaas	2006	1	0	1	0	0	0%
14	Kumar Sangakkara	2009–2011	45	27	14	4	0	60%
15	Tillakaratne Dilshan	2010–2012	26	11	15	0	0	42.31%
16	Angelo Mathews	2012–2018	104	49	49	5	1	47.12%
17	Dinesh Chandimal	2013-2018	12	6	5	0	1	50%
18	Lahiru Thirimanne	2015-2019	5	1	4	0	0	20%
19	Upul Tharanga	2016–2017	21	4	15	0	2	19.05%
20	Chamara Kapugedera	2017	1	0	1	0	0	0%
21	Lasith Malinga	2017–2019	9	0	9	0	0	0%
22	Thisara Perera	2017	3	1	2	0	0	33.33%
23	Dimuth Karunaratne	2019–2021	16	10	6	0	0	62.5%
24	Kusal Perera	2021	6	1	4	1	0	33.3%
25	Dasun Shanaka	2021–2023	41	23	17	1	0	58.9%
26	Kusal Mendis	2023–present	13	7	5	1	0	33.12%
Grand total			915	420	450	40	5	45.88%

Updated 15 February 2024

=== Twenty20 International captains ===
This is a list of cricketers who have captained the Sri Lankan cricket team for at least one Twenty20 International.

Sri Lanka T20I captains
No.	Name	First	Last	Mat	Won	Lost	Tied	NR	Win%	Ref.
1	Mahela Jayawardene	2006	2012	19	12	6	1	0	65.78%	
2	Tillakaratne Dilshan	2008	2011	5	2	3	0	0	40.0%	
3	Kumar Sangakkara	2009	2012	22	13	9	0	0	59.09%	
4	Thilina Kandamby	2011	2011	1	1	0	0	0	100%	
5	Angelo Mathews	2012	2021	16	6	9	0	1	40.00%	
6	Dinesh Chandimal	2013	2018	26	13	13	0	0	50.00%	
7	Lasith Malinga	2014	2020	24	7	15	1	1	32.60%	
8	Upul Tharanga	2017	2017	6	3	3	0	0	50.00%	
9	Thisara Perera	2017	2018	9	0	9	0	0	00.00%	
10	Dasun Shanaka	2019	2023	48	22	24	2	0	47.91%	
11	Kusal Perera	2021	2021	3	0	3	0	0	0.00%	
12	Sahan Arachchige	2023	2023	1	0	1	0	0	0.00%	
13	Wanindu Hasaranga	2024	2024	10	6	4	0	0	60%	
14	Charith Asalanka	2024	2024	5	1	3	1	0	20%	
Total				192	85	100	4	2	45.76%	

Updated: 14 July 2024

=== ICC Trophy ===
The ICC Trophy is the leading one-day tournament from non-Test teams, and Sri Lanka participated in the tournament before they gained Test status. This is a list of the men who captained Sri Lanka in the ICC Trophy.

Sri Lankan ICC Trophy captains
Number	Name	Year	Played	Won	Tied	Lost	No result	Where finished
1	Anura Tennekoon	1979	3	3	0	0	0	Winners
2	Bandula Warnapura	1979	1	1	0	0	0	Winners
Grand total			4	4	0	0	0	

== Other Men's captains ==
=== Rebel tours to South Africa ===
In October and November 1982 a group of Sri Lankan cricketers went on a private tour of apartheid South Africa. It was the first time a tour comprising all non-white cricketers had toured white South Africa (a team of Kenyan Asians had previously visited the black areas of South Africa, and the International Wanderers XI

== Women's cricket ==
=== Test match captains ===
This is a list of cricketers who have captained the Sri Lankan women's cricket team for at least one women's Test match. Sri Lanka have played only one women's Test.

Sri Lankan women's Test match captains
Number	Name	Year	Opposition	Location	Played	Won	Lost	Drawn
1	Rasanjali Silva	1997	Pakistan	Sri Lanka	1	1	0	0

=== Women's One-Day International captains ===
This is a list of cricketers who have captained the Sri Lankan women's cricket team for at least one women's one-day international. The table of results is complete to the women's ODI against South Africa in the World Cup in 2004/5. Sri Lanka have never reached the semi-final stage in women's World Cups.

Sri Lankan women's ODI captains
Number	Name	Year	Played	Won	Tied	Lost	No result
1	Vanessa Bowen	1997	7	2	0	5	0
2	Rasanjali Silva	1998–2000	15	10	0	5	0
3	Suthershini Sivanantham	2002–03	12	12	0	0	0
4	Thanuja Ekanayake	2004	4	0	0	4	0
5	Chandimali Samanthi	2004	1	0	0	1	0
6	Sandamali Dolawatta	2005–2013	6	1	0	4	1
7	Shashikala Siriwardene	2005–2017	54	18	0	34	2
8	Chamani Seneviratna	2010	2	1	0	1	0
9	Dilani Manodara	2010	11	5	0	5	1
10	Chamari Athapaththu	2014–2015	11	1	0	9	1
11	Eshani Kaushalya	2015	2	1	0	1	0
12	Inoka Ranaweera	2017	4	0	0	4	0
Grand total			128	51	0	72	5

=== Women's Twenty20International captains ===
Sri Lankan women's T20I captains
Number	Name	Year	Played	Won	Tied	Lost	No result
1	Chamari Polgampola	2009	3	1	0	2	0
2	Chamani Seneviratna	2010	6	1	0	5	0
3	Shashikala Siriwardene	2010–2014	31	9	0	20	2
4	Dilani Manodara	2012	5	1	0	3	1
5	Chamari Athapaththu	2014–2015	12	4	0	8	0
Grand total			57	16	0	38	3

== Youth cricket ==
=== Test match captains ===
This is a list of cricketers who have captained the Sri Lankan Under-19 cricket team for at least one under-19 Test match. The table of results is complete to the second "Test" against Pakistan in 2004/5. Where a player has a dagger (†) next to a Test match series in which he captained at least one Test, that denotes that player was captain for a minor proportion in a series. The very nature of Under-19 cricket means that in practice no youth captains the side for more than one year.

Sri Lankan Under-19 Test match captains
Number	Name	Year	Opposition	Location	Played	Won	Lost	Drawn
1	Aravinda de Silva	1983/4	Australia	Australia	3	0	1	2
2	Roshan Mahanama	1984/5	Australia	Australia	1	1	0	0
3	Asanka Gurusinha	1986	England	England	3	0	1	2
4	Denham Madena	1986/7	England	Sri Lanka	3	0	0	3
5	Suchithra Alexander	1992	England	England	3	0	1	2
6	Avishka Gunawardene	1993/4	England	Sri Lanka	3	1	0	2
7	Nimesh Perera	1996/7	India	Sri Lanka	3	0	2	1
8	Upekha Fernando	1998/9	India	India	1	0	0	1
9	Kaushalya Weeraratne	2000	England	England	3	2	1	0
10	Thilina Kandamby	2000/1	Australia	Australia	3	0	3	0
11	Farveez Maharoof	2003	Pakistan	Sri Lanka	2	0	0	2
12	Harsha Vithana	2005	Pakistan	Pakistan	2	0	0	2
14	Angelo Mathews	2005	England	England	3	0	3	0
15	Sachith Pathirana	2007	India	Sri Lanka	2	0	1	1
16	Dinesh Chandimal	2009	Bangladesh	Bangladesh	2	0	0	2
17	Chathura Peiris	2010	England	England	2	1	1	0
18	Bhanuka Rajapaksa	2011	Bangladesh	Bangladesh	2	0	0	2
19	Kusal Mendis	2013	India	Sri Lanka	4	0	0	4
Grand total					47	6	14	27

=== Youth One-Day International captains ===
This is a list of cricketers who have captained the Sri Lankan Under-19 cricket team for at least one Under-19 One Day International. The table of results is complete to the end of the 2005/6 Afro-Asia Cup. Sri Lanka's best result in the Under-19 World Cup was as runners-up in 1999/2000 under the captaincy of Malintha Gajanayake.

Sri Lankan Under-19 ODI captains
Number	Name	Year	Played	Won	Tied	Lost	No result
1	Aravinda de Silva	1983/4	3	1	0	2	0
2	Asanka Gurusinha	1986	2	2	0	0	0
3	Denham Madena	1986/7	3	2	0	1	0
4	Rohan Weerakkody	1987/8	7	3	0	4	0
5	Marvan Atapattu	1989/90	3	1	0	2	0
6	Avishka Gunawardene	1993/4	3	2	0	1	0
7	Pradeep Hewage	1997/8	6	4	0	2	0
8	Upekha Fernando	1998/9	3	0	0	3	0
9	Prasanna Jayawardene	1998/9	1	0	0	1	0
10	Malintha Gajanayake	1999/2000	8	6	0	2	0
11	Kaushalya Weeraratne	2000	3	0	0	3	0
12	Thilina Kandamby	2000/1	4	1	0	1	2
13	Dhammika Niroshana	2001/2	10	1	0	8	1
14	Jeewan Mendis	2001/2	1	1	0	0	0
15	Farveez Maharoof	2003-2003/4	19	9	0	10	0
16	Harsha Vithana	2004/5	3	2	0	1	0
17	Angelo Mathews	2005–2006	9	4	0	4	1
18	Sameera de Zoysa	2006	2	1	0	1	0
19	Sachith Pathirana	2007	10	3	0	6	1
20	Ashan Priyanjan	2007/08	15	7	0	8	0
21	Dinesh Chandimal	2009	5	1	0	4	0
22	Chathura Peiris	2009/10	24	12	0	10	2
23	Bhanuka Rajapaksa	2009–2011	5	3	0	1	1
24	Yashodha Lanka	2011	1	0	0	1	0
25	Angelo Jayasinghe	2011	7	3	0	4	0
26	Sanitha de Mel	2012	8	5	0	3	0
27	Kusal Mendis	2013/14	18	9	0	8	1
28	Sadeera Samarawickrama	2014	1	1	0	0	0
29	Charith Asalanka	2015/16	19	8	0	9	2
Grand total			225	105	0	108	12

== See also ==
- List of international cricket grounds in Sri Lanka
