= Sri Lankan cricket team in New Zealand in 2005–06 =

Sri Lankans in New Zealand in 2005-06
	Sri Lanka	New Zealand
- Dates: 31 December 2005 – 8 January 2006
Captains	Marvan Atapattu	Stephen Fleming

One Day International series
- Results: New Zealand won the 5-match series 4–1
Most runs	Marvan Atapattu (175)	Peter Fulton (264)
Most wickets	Chaminda Vaas (11)	Shane Bond (9)
- Player of the series: –

The Sri Lankan cricket team toured New Zealand to play both a one-day international (ODIs) and a Test series during the 2005–06 season. Sri Lanka were scheduled to play five ODIs and three Test matches in the 2004–05 season, beginning their tour on 26 December 2004, but due to the 2004 Indian Ocean earthquake which hit the island of Sri Lanka hard, the Sri Lankan team travelled home after the first ODI. The Test matches were rescheduled to April, and the remaining four ODIs were played between 31 December 2005 and 8 January 2006.

== 2004–05 tour ==
=== 1st ODI ===
26 December 2004
Scorecard

Sri Lanka; 141 (42 overs)	v	New Zealand; 144/3 (33 overs)
Tillakaratne Dilshan 48 (79); Chris Cairns 4/33 (8 overs)		Stephen Fleming 77* (92); Upul Chandana 1/29 (7 overs)

New Zealand won by 7 wickets (with 102 balls remaining)
Eden Park, Auckland
Umpires: Billy Bowden (NZ) and Peter Parker (Aus)
Player of the match: Stephen Fleming (NZ)

- New Zealand won the toss and elected to field.

New Zealand won the first match of the series by seven wickets and with 17 overs to spare. After this match however, due to the difference between New Zealand and Sri Lankan time zone the tsunami hit South East Asian countries, including Sri Lanka; spin bowler Muttiah Muralitharan missed being hit by the tsunami by twenty minutes. Concerns for relatives led the Sri Lankan team to head home. The Test match series was postponed until April.

In place of the Sri Lankan fixtures in the 2004–05 season New Zealand played a composite team, the FICA World XI led by Shane Warne.

The Sri Lankan and New Zealand Cricket boards rescheduled the one day matches for the 2005–06 season.

== 2005–06 tour ==
Sri Lanka were coming off a 1–6 series defeat on tour of India in November, while New Zealand lost 0–4 in their most recent ODI series, in South Africa in October. Both teams were in mid-table of the ICC ODI Championship when the series began, with Sri Lanka in sixth and New Zealand in fourth place – though both teams had a 109 points. A loss for either of the teams would place them outside the top six of the ODI Championship, and places in the top six on 1 April 2006 would guarantee an appearance at the 2006 Champions Trophy. New Zealand won the first three of the four matches, but ended up losing the fourth in chase of a winning target of 274, which meant Sri Lanka avoided the whitewash. They did, however, fall into seventh place before playing in the VB Series in Australia later that month.

Peter Fulton, who had only played one One Day International before this series, topped the run-scoring tables for the four-match series, scoring 264 runs with one century and two fifties. For Sri Lanka, captain Marvan Atapattu top-scored with 175, including a 69 in the final match which gave him the Man of the Match award. On the bowling side, Chaminda Vaas began with a total of two wickets in the first two matches, before taking five for 39 and four for 48 to end with 11 wickets at a bowling average of 15.27, the second-lowest in the series (excluding Nathan Astle, who bowled three overs). No other Sri Lankan bowler took more than three wickets. For New Zealand, Shane Bond took nine wickets, Kyle Mills five and Jacob Oram four, all at an average below 21. Jeetan Patel only played one match, the third, where he was named Man of the Match after a spell of 10–0–23–2, which gave him the lowest bowling average of the series.

=== Squads ===
New Zealand	Sri Lanka
Stephen Fleming (c); Brendon McCullum (wk); Nathan Astle; Shane Bond; Chris Cairns; Chris Martin; James Franklin; Peter Fulton; Jamie How; Hamish Marshall; Kyle Mills; Jacob Oram; Scott Styris; Lou Vincent	Marvan Atapattu (c); Kumar Sangakkara (wk); Russel Arnold; Malinga Bandara; Tillakaratne Dilshan; Dilhara Fernando; Avishka Gunawardene; Sanath Jayasuriya; Mahela Jayawardene; Farveez Maharoof; Lasith Malinga; Jehan Mubarak; Muttiah Muralitharan; Ruchira Perera; Upul Tharanga; Chaminda Vaas

Andre Adams was originally selected, but broke a bone in his right hand before the series started and was replaced by Franklin.

Fleming withdrew from the first One Day International to be with his wife during the birth of his first child. Vettori captained the side in the first match, while Astle was selected as a replacement after being dropped originally.

Mills and Oram withdrew before the third ODI due to injury. Martin and Franklin replaced them, while Astle was dropped for a returning Fleming. Astle did play the fourth ODI, however.

=== 2nd ODI ===
31 December 2005
Scorecard

Sri Lanka; 164 (47.2 overs)	v	New Zealand; 166/3 (37.2 overs)
TM Dilshan 42 (54); SE Bond 3/29 (8.2 overs)		PG Fulton 70* (79); M Muralitharan 1/29 (10 overs)

New Zealand won by 7 wickets
Queenstown Events Centre, Queenstown
Umpires: DB Hair (AUS) and AL Hill (NZ)
Player of the match: PG Fulton (NZ)

- New Zealand won the toss and elected to field.
- JM How (NZ) made his ODI debut.

Sri Lanka were put in to bat by New Zealand captain Daniel Vettori, and after going through the first eight overs without losing a wicket, Sanath Jayasuriya and Kumar Sangakkara were caught in successive overs. Mahela Jayawardene lasted 10 balls before he, too, was caught, and the three New Zealand seamers Shane Bond, Kyle Mills and Jacob Oram had a wicket each. Oram got another in the 15th over, when opener Upul Tharanga was caught behind for 17, before captain and number five Marvan Atapattu rebuilt with Tillakaratne Dilshan. Their partnership lasted nearly 14 overs, as both passed 20, but Atapattu was caught for 35, and seven overs later Dilshan was also caught, for 42. The last four wickets yielded 31 runs, and Sri Lanka were all out for 164 when Muttiah Muralitharan was caught at mid-off for 0.

Chasing, New Zealand lost Lou Vincent and Nathan Astle for sub-20 scores (Astle facing 15 balls but only scoring two runs), before their third-wicket pairing, who had played a combined total of one ODI before this match, added 95 runs for the third wicket. Jamie How, the ODI debutant, was eventually bowled when he missed a slog sweep off Sanath Jayasuriya, and was out for 58, but Hamish Marshall chipped in with 16 not out in the unbeaten fourth-wicket stand, and New Zealand won by seven wickets with more than 12 overs remaining.

=== 3rd ODI ===
3 January 2006
Scorecard

Sri Lanka; 255/7 (50 overs)	v	New Zealand; 256/5 (48 overs)
WU Tharanga 103 (125); KD Mills 2/44 (10 overs)		NJ Astle 90* (125); MF Maharoof 2/41 (6 overs)

New Zealand won by 5 wickets
Jade Stadium, Christchurch
Umpires: GAV Baxter (NZ) and DB Hair (AUS)
Player of the match: WU Tharanga (SL)

- New Zealand won the toss and elected to field.

=== 4th ODI ===
6 January 2006 (D/N)
Scorecard

New Zealand; 224/9 (50 overs)	v	Sri Lanka; 203 (46.4 overs)
PG Fulton 50 (64); HJH Marshall 50 (71); WPUJC Vaas 5/39 (10 overs)		J Mubarak 53 (84); SE Bond 3/39 (9.4 overs)

New Zealand won by 21 runs
Westpac Stadium, Wellington
Umpires: DB Hair (AUS) and AL Hill (NZ)
Player of the match: JS Patel (NZ)

- New Zealand won the toss and elected to bat.
- HMCM Bandara (SL) made his ODI debut.

=== 5th ODI ===
8 January 2006
Scorecard

Sri Lanka; 273/6 (50 overs)	v	New Zealand; 253 (48.2 overs)
MS Atapattu 69 (68); CS Martin 3/62 (10 overs)		PG Fulton 112 (131); WPUJC Vaas 4/48 (9 overs)

Sri Lanka won by 20 runs
McLean Park, Napier
Umpires: GAV Baxter (NZ) and DB Hair (AUS)
Player of the match: WPUJC Vaas (SL)

- Sri Lanka won the toss and elected to bat.
