= Paktel Cup =

2004-05 men's cricket tournament in Pakistan

- Part of the Sri Lanka in Pakistan
- Date: 30 September 2004 – 16 October 2004
- Location: Pakistan
- Result: Sri Lanka won
- Player of the series: (Pakistan) Shoaib Malik
Teams
Pakistan	Sri Lanka	Zimbabwe
Captains
Inzamam-ul-Haq	Marvan Atapattu	Tatenda Taibu
Most runs
Malik (260) Yousuf (159) Inzamam (153)	Atapattu (223); Sangakkara (175); Jayasuriya (124)	Ebrahim (124); Taylor (81); Matsikenyeri (78)
Most wickets
Shahid Afridi (8) Shoaib Malik (7) Rana Naved (7)	Chandana (7); Vaas (6); Jayasuriya (5)	Panyangara (6); Hondo (5); Chigumbura (2)

The 2004–05 Paktel Cup was a three-team One Day International men's cricket tournament held in Pakistan in September and October 2004, between the host, Sri Lanka and Zimbabwe. The teams played each other two matches. The top two teams on points went on to play the final.

== Group Stage Table ==
Group Stage
Pos	Team	P	W	L	T	NR	NRR	For	Against	Points
1	Pakistan	4	4	0	0	0	+0.612	1080/195.4	925/200.0	21
2	Sri Lanka	4	1	2	0	1	+0.499	633/118.1	634/147.3	11
3	Zimbabwe	4	0	3	0	1	−1.508	504/150.0	658/116.2	4

== Schedule ==
Group Stage
No.	Date	Team 1	Team 2	Venue
1st	30 September	Pakistan	Zimbabwe	Multan Cricket Stadium, Multan
2nd	2 October	Pakistan	Zimbabwe	Arbab Niaz Stadium, Peshawar
3rd	6 October	Pakistan	Sri Lanka	National Stadium, Karachi
4th	9 October	Sri Lanka	Zimbabwe	Rawalpindi Cricket Stadium, Rawalpindi
5th	11 October	Sri Lanka	Zimbabwe	Rawalpindi Cricket Stadium, Rawalpindi
6th	14 October	Pakistan	Sri Lanka	Gaddafi Stadium Lahore
Final
Final	16 October	Pakistan	Sri Lanka	Gaddafi Stadium, Lahore

== Group stage matches ==
=== 1st ODI ===
30 September 2004
Scorecard

Pakistan; 292/7 (50 overs)	v	Zimbabwe; 148 (38.3 overs)
Abdul Razzaq 107* (114); Douglas Hondo 3/54 (10 overs)		Vusi Sibanda 57 (69); Shahid Afridi 3/18 (6.3 overs)

Pakistan won by 144 runs
Multan Cricket Stadium, Multan
Umpires: Mark Benson (Eng) and Nadeem Ghauri (Pak)
Player of the match: Abdul Razzaq (Pak)

- Pakistan won the toss and elected to bat

=== 2nd ODI ===
3 October 2004
Scorecard

Zimbabwe; 252/4 (50 overs)	v	Pakistan; 258/7 (48.1 overs)
Brendan Taylor 73 (122); Rana Naved-ul-Hasan 2/82 (10 overs)		Shoaib Malik 80 (104); Tinashe Panyangara 3/28 (9 overs)

Pakistan won by 3 wickets
Arbab Niaz Stadium, Peshawar
Umpires: Asad Rauf (Pak) and Mark Benson (Eng)
Player of the match: Younis Khan (Pak)

- Pakistan won the toss and elected to field.

=== 3rd ODI ===
6 October 2004
Scorecard

Sri Lanka; 232/9 (50 overs)	v	Pakistan; 233/2 (48.4 overs)
Sanath Jayasuriya 53 (85); Shoaib Malik 3/32 (10 overs)		Mohammad Yousuf 107* (121); Chaminda Vaas 1/24 (10 overs)

Pakistan won by 8 wickets
National Stadium, Karachi
Umpires: Asad Rauf (Pak) and Mark Benson (Eng)
Player of the match: Shoaib Malik (Pak)

- Sri Lanka won the toss and elected to bat

=== 4th ODI ===
9 October 2004
Scorecard

Zimbabwe; 104 (33 overs)	v	Sri Lanka; 108/3 (18.1 overs)
Stuart Matsikenyeri 37 (46); Upul Chandana 3/15 (6 overs)		Sanath Jayasuriya 40 (30); Elton Chigumbura 2/18 (3 overs)

Sri Lanka won by 7 wickets
Rawalpindi Cricket Stadium, Rawalpindi
Umpires: Aleem Dar (Pak) and Simon Taufel (Aus)
Player of the match: Farveez Maharoof (Sri)

- Sri Lanka won the toss and elected to field.

=== 5th ODI ===
11 October 2004
Scorecard

Sri Lanka	v	Zimbabwe

Match abandoned without a ball bowled
Rawalpindi Cricket Stadium, Rawalpindi
Umpires: Aleem Dar (Pak) and Simon Taufel (Aus)

- No toss.
- No play was possible due to rain.

=== 6th ODI ===
14 October 2004
Scorecard

Sri Lanka; 293/6 (50 overs)	v	Pakistan; 297/4 (48.5 overs)
Marvan Atapattu 111 (114); Rana Naved-ul-Hasan 2/65 (10 overs)		Inzamam-ul-Haq 76* (59); Chaminda Vaas 2/62 (9.5 overs)

Pakistan won by 6 wickets
Gaddafi Stadium, Lahore
Umpires: Nadeem Ghauri (Pak) and Simon Taufel (Aus)
Player of the match: Marvan Atapattu (Sri)

- Pakistan won the toss and elected to field.

== Final ==
16 October 2004
Scorecard

Sri Lanka; 287/7 (50 overs)	v	Pakistan; 168 (38 overs)
Kumar Sangakkara 68 (69); Shahid Afridi 2/60 (10 overs)		Salman Butt 40 (61); Sanath Jayasuriya 5/17 (8 overs)

Sri Lanka won by 119 runs
Gaddafi Stadium, Lahore
Umpires: Aleem Dar (Pak) and Simon Taufel (Aus)
Player of the match: Kumar Sangakkara (Sri)

- Pakistan won the toss and elected to field.
