= Sri Lankan cricket team in New Zealand in 2004–05 =

	Sri Lanka	New Zealand
- Dates: 26 December 2004 – 14 April 2005
Captains	Marvan Atapattu	Stephen Fleming

Test series
- Result: New Zealand won the 2-match series 1–0
Most runs	Thilan Samaraweera (178)	Lou Vincent (276)
Most wickets	Lasith Malinga (11)	Chris Martin (11)

One Day International series
- Results: New Zealand won the 5-match series 1–0
Most runs	Tillakaratne Dilshan (48)	Stephen Fleming (77)
Most wickets	Upul Chandana (1)	Chris Cairns (4)
- Player of the series: tour postponed due to the tsunami disaster

The Sri Lankan national cricket team toured New Zealand in the 2004–05 season. They played 2 Test matches and 5 ODIs. New Zealand won the Test series 1–0.

== Squads ==
Tests		ODIs	
Sri Lanka	New Zealand	Sri Lanka	New Zealand
Marvan Atapattu (c); Kumar Sangakkara (wk); Sanath Jayasuriya; Mahela Jayawardene; Thilan Samaraweera; Tillakaratne Dilshan; Chaminda Vaas; Upul Chandana; Rangana Herath; Nuwan Kulasekara; Lasith Malinga; Shantha Kalavitigoda; Farveez Maharoof	Stephen Fleming (c); Brendon McCullum (wk); Craig Cumming; James Marshall; Hamish Marshall; Nathan Astle; Lou Vincent; James Franklin; Kyle Mills; Paul Wiseman; Chris Martin	Marvan Atapattu (c); Kumar Sangakkara (wk); Saman Jayantha; Sanath Jayasuriya; Mahela Jayawardene; Tillakaratne Dilshan; Upul Chandana; Chaminda Vaas; Farveez Maharoof; Nuwan Kulasekara; Dilhara Fernando; Russel Arnold; Rangana Herath; Lasith Malinga; Nuwan Zoysa	Stephen Fleming (c); Brendon McCullum (wk); Nathan Astle; Mathew Sinclair; Scott Styris; Hamish Marshall; Jacob Oram; Chris Cairns; Daniel Vettori; Kyle Mills; Daryl Tuffey; Ian Butler

== ODI series ==
=== 1st ODI ===
26 December 2004
Scorecard

Sri Lanka; 141 (42 overs)	v	New Zealand; 144/3 (33 overs)
Tillakaratne Dilshan 48 (79); Chris Cairns 4/33 (8 overs)		Stephen Fleming 77* (92); Upul Chandana 1/29 (7 overs)

New Zealand won by 7 wickets (with 102 balls remaining)
Eden Park, Auckland
Umpires: Billy Bowden (NZ) and Peter Parker (Aus)
Player of the match: Stephen Fleming (NZ)

- New Zealand won the toss and elected to field.

=== 2nd ODI ===
29 December 2004
Scorecard

New Zealand	v	Sri Lanka

Match cancelled without a ball bowled
McLean Park, Napier
Umpires: Billy Bowden (NZ) and Peter Parker (Aus)

- No toss
- The remainder of the tour was postponed due to the tsunami disaster.
- This match was first rescheduled to 11 January before the tour was called off.

=== 3rd ODI ===
2 January 2005
Scorecard

New Zealand	v	Sri Lanka

Match cancelled without a ball bowled
Queenstown Events Centre, Queenstown
Umpires: Doug Cowie (NZ) and Peter Parker (Aus)

- No toss
- The remainder of the tour was postponed due to the tsunami disaster.

=== 4th ODI ===
4 January 2005
Scorecard

New Zealand	v	Sri Lanka

Match cancelled without a ball bowled
Jade Stadium, Christchurch
Umpires: Doug Cowie (NZ) and Peter Parker (Aus)

- No toss
- The remainder of the tour was postponed due to the tsunami disaster.

=== 5th ODI ===
8 January 2005
Scorecard

New Zealand	v	Sri Lanka

Match cancelled without a ball bowled
Westpac Stadium, Wellington
Umpires: Darrell Hair (Aus) and Tony Hill (NZ)

- No toss
- The remainder of the tour was postponed due to the tsunami disaster.

== Tour matches ==
=== First-class: Major Associations XI v Sri Lankans ===
28 March 2005
Scorecard

Major Associations XI	v	Sri Lankans
321 (87.1 overs); Craig McMillan 121 (164); Lasith Malinga 3/57 (19 overs)

Match drawn
Village Green, Christchurch
Umpires: Tony Hill (NZ) and Evan Watkin (NZ)

- Major Associations XI won the toss and elected to bat.
- No play was possible on day 2.

== Test series ==
=== 1st Test ===
4–8 April 2005
Scorecard

New Zealand	v	Sri Lanka
562 (159.1 overs); Hamish Marshall 160 (250); Lasith Malinga 4/130 (34 overs)		498 (148.1 overs); Mahela Jayawardene 141 (243); James Franklin 4/126 (32.1 overs)
238 (92.4 overs); Lou Vincent 52 (112); Lasith Malinga 5/80 (24.4 overs)		7/0 (1.3 overs); Sanath Jayasuriya 5* (6)

Match drawn
McLean Park, Napier
Umpires: Steve Bucknor (WI) and Darrell Hair (Aus)
Player of the match: Lasith Malinga (SL)

- New Zealand won the toss and elected to bat.
- Nuwan Kulasekara (SL) made his Test debut.

=== 2nd Test ===
11–15 April 2005
Scorecard

Sri Lanka	v	New Zealand
211 (65.1 overs); Thilan Samaraweera 73 (163); Chris Martin 6/54 (20 overs)		522/9 wickets dec; 146 overs); Lou Vincent 224 (348); Chaminda Vaas 6/108 (40 overs)
273 (92.5 overs); Tillakaratne Dilshan 73 (99); James Franklin 4/71 (23.5 overs)

New Zealand won by an innings and 38 runs
Basin Reserve, Wellington
Umpires: Steve Bucknor (WI) and Darrell Hair (Aus)
Player of the match: Lou Vincent (NZ)

- New Zealand won the toss and elected to field
- Shantha Kalavitigoda (SL) made his Test debut.
