= Sri Lankan cricket team in India in 1990–91 =

International cricket tour

Sri Lanka's tour of India in 1990-91
	India	Sri Lanka
- Dates: 23 November 1990 – 8 December 1990
Captains	Mohammad Azharuddin	Arjuna Ranatunga

Test series
- Result: India won the 1-match series 1–0
Most runs	Ravi Shastri 88	Hashan Tillakaratne 55
Most wickets	Venkatapathy Raju 8	Rumesh Ratnayake; Jayananda Warnaweera; Ranjith Madurasinghe 3

One Day International series
- Results: India won the 3-match series 2–1
Most runs	Ravi Shastri 166	Aravinda de Silva 168
Most wickets	Manoj Prabhakar 4	Don Anurasiri; Rumesh Ratnayake 4

Sri Lanka's cricket tour of India in the 1990–91 season consisted of one Test match and a three-match ODI series. India won the only Test as well as the ODI series 2-1

== Test series ==
=== Only Test ===
23-27 November 1990

India	v	Sri Lanka
288 (110.5 overs); Ravi Shastri 88; Rumesh Ratnayake 3/60 (21.5 overs)		82 (51.5 overs); Asanka Gurusinha 52*; Venkatapathy Raju 6/12 (17.5 overs)
		198 (120.4 overs) (f/o); Hashan Tillakaratne 55; Kapil Dev 4/36 (29.4 overs)

India won by an innings and 8 runs
Sector 16 Stadium, Chandigarh
Player of the match: Venkatapathy Raju (Ind)

- India won the toss and chose to bat
- Marvan Atapattu (SL) made his test debut.

== ODI Series ==
=== 1st ODI ===
1 December 1990
Scorecard

India; 245/5 (45 overs)	v	Sri Lanka; 226/7 (45 overs)
Ravi Shastri 101* (147); Rumesh Ratnayake 2/36 (10 overs)		Aravinda de Silva 104 (124); Manoj Prabhakar 3/47 (10 overs)

India won by 19 runs
Vidarbha Cricket Association Ground, Nagpur
Umpires: Subrata Banerjee (Ind) and Shyam Bansal (Ind)
Player of the match: Ravi Shastri (SL)

- Sri Lanka won the toss and elected to field.
- Marvan Atapattu (Sl) made his ODI debut.

=== 2nd ODI ===
5 December 1990
Scorecard

Sri Lanka; 227/8 (49 overs)	v	India; 230/4 (45.3 overs)
Arjuna Ranatunga 58 (27); Arshad Ayub 2/38 (8 overs)		Sachin Tendulkar 53 (41); Don Anurasiri 2/44 (10 overs)

India won by 6 wickets
Nehru Stadium, Pune
Player of the match: Sachin Tendulkar (Ind)

- India won the toss and elected to field.
- Dammika Ranatunga (Sl) made his ODI debut.

=== 3rd ODI ===
8 December 1990
Scorecard

India; 136 (40.3 overs)	v	Sri Lanka; 137/3 (32.5 overs)
Sachin Tendulkar 30 (29); Champaka Ramanayake 3/15 (7 overs)		aravinda de Silva 63* (70); Kapil Dev 1/16 (4 overs)

Sri Lanka won by 7 wickets
Fatorda Stadium, Margoa
Umpires: Borni Jamula (Ind) and Rangachari Vijayaraghavan (Ind)
Player of the match: Aravinda de Silva (SL)

- India won the toss and elected to bat.
- Romesh Kaluwitharana and Jayananda Warnaweera (Sl) both made their ODI debuts.
