= International cricket in 2004–05 =

Cricket season

The 2004–05 international cricket season was from September 2004 to April 2005. There were no major tournaments played during this time. The season included the first-ever Twenty20 International match.

== Season overview ==
International tours
Start date	Home team	Away team	Results [Matches]		
Start date	Home team	Away team	Test	ODI	T20I
6 October 2004	India	Australia	1–2 [4]	—	—
19 October 2004	Bangladesh	New Zealand	0–2 [2]	0–3 [3]	—
20 October 2004	Pakistan	Sri Lanka	1–1 [2]	—	—
18 November 2004	Australia	New Zealand	2–0 [2]	1–1 [3]	—
20 November 2004	India	South Africa	1–0 [2]	—	—
28 November 2004	Zimbabwe	England	—	0–4 [4]	—
10 December 2004	Bangladesh	India	0–2 [2]	1–2 [3]	—
16 December 2004	Australia	Pakistan	3–0 [3]	—	—
17 December 2004	South Africa	England	1–2 [5]	4–1 [7]	—
26 December 2004	New Zealand	Sri Lanka	1–0 [2]	1–0 [1]	—
6 January 2005	Bangladesh	Zimbabwe	1–0 [2]	3–2 [5]	—
17 February 2005	New Zealand	Australia	0–2 [3]	0–5 [5]	0–1 [1]
25 February 2005	South Africa	Zimbabwe	2–0 [2]	3–0 [3]	—
8 March 2005	India	Pakistan	1–1 [3]	2–4 [6]	—
31 March 2005	West Indies	South Africa	0–2 [4]	0–5 [5]	—
Other international series
Dates	Tournament			Winners	
30 September 2004	(Pakistan) Paktel Cup			Sri Lanka	
13 November 2004	(India) BCCI Platinum Jubilee Match			Pakistan	
10 January 2005	(Australia) World Cricket Tsunami Appeal			ICC World XI	
14 January 2005	(Australia) VB Series			Australia	

== Pre-season rankings ==
ICC Test Championship 31 August 2004
Pos	Nation	Points
1	Australia	129
2	England	109
3	Pakistan	105
4	India	104
5	Sri Lanka	103
6	South Africa	102
7	New Zealand	94
8	West Indies	73
9	Zimbabwe	51
10	Bangladesh	1

ICC ODI Championship 31 August 2004
Rank	Team	Matches	Points	Rating
1	Australia	30	4143	138
2	Sri Lanka	30	3679	123
3	New Zealand	24	2810	117
4	Pakistan	33	3477	105
5	India	29	2977	103
6	South Africa	27	2766	102
7	England	18	1842	102
8	West Indies	22	2213	101
9	Zimbabwe	23	1412	61
10	Kenya	6	169	28
11	Bangladesh	0	0	0
Reference: ICC ODI Championship Archived 2005-11-25 at the Wayback Machine, 2 September 2004

== September ==
=== Paktel Cup ===
Pos	Team	Pld	W	L	T	NR	NRR	Pts
1	Pakistan	4	4	0	0	0	+0.612	21
2	Sri Lanka	4	1	2	0	1	+0.499	11
3	Zimbabwe	4	0	3	0	1	–1.508	4

Group stage
No.	Date	Team 1	Captain 1	Team 2	Captain 2	Venue	Result
ODI 2183	30 September	Pakistan	Inzamam-ul-Haq	Zimbabwe	Tatenda Taibu	Multan Cricket Stadium, Multan	Pakistan by 144 runs
ODI 2184	3 October	Pakistan	Mohammad Yousuf	Zimbabwe	Tatenda Taibu	Arbab Niaz Stadium, Peshawar	Pakistan by 3 wickets
ODI 2185	6 October	Pakistan	Inzamam-ul-Haq	Sri Lanka	Marvan Atapattu	National Stadium, Karachi	Pakistan by 8 wickets
ODI 2186	9 October	Sri Lanka	Marvan Atapattu	Zimbabwe	Tatenda Taibu	Rawalpindi Cricket Stadium, Rawalpindi	Sri Lanka by 7 wickets
ODI 2186a	11 October	Sri Lanka	Marvan Atapattu	Zimbabwe	Tatenda Taibu	Rawalpindi Cricket Stadium, Rawalpindi	Match abandoned
ODI 2187	14 October	Pakistan	Inzamam-ul-Haq	Sri Lanka	Marvan Atapattu	Gaddafi Stadium, Lahore	Pakistan by 6 wickets
Final
ODI 2188	16 October	Pakistan	Inzamam-ul-Haq	Sri Lanka	Marvan Atapattu	Gaddafi Stadium, Lahore	Sri Lanka by 119 runs

== October ==
=== Australia in India ===
No.	Date	Home captain	Away captain	Venue	Result
Test series
Test 1713	6–10 October	Sourav Ganguly	Adam Gilchrist	M. Chinnaswamy Stadium, Bangalore	Australia by 217 runs
Test 1714	14–18 October	Sourav Ganguly	Adam Gilchrist	M. A. Chidambaram Stadium, Chennai	Match drawn
Test 1718	26–29 October	Rahul Dravid	Adam Gilchrist	Vidarbha Cricket Association Ground, Nagpur	Australia by 342 runs
Test 1720	3–5 November	Rahul Dravid	Ricky Ponting	Wankhede Stadium, Mumbai	India by 13 runs

=== New Zealand in Bangladesh ===
No.	Date	Home captain	Away captain	Venue	Result
Test series
Test 1715	19–22 October	Khaled Mashud	Stephen Fleming	Bangabandhu National Stadium, Dhaka	New Zealand by innings and 99 runs
Test 1717	26–29 October	Khaled Mashud	Stephen Fleming	M. A. Aziz Stadium, Chittagong	New Zealand by innings and 101 runs
ODI series
ODI 2189	2 November	Habibul Bashar	Daniel Vettori	M. A. Aziz Stadium, Chittagong	New Zealand by 138 runs
ODI 2190	5 November	Habibul Bashar	Daniel Vettori	Bangabandhu National Stadium, Dhaka	New Zealand by 3 wickets
ODI 2191	7 November	Khaled Mashud	Daniel Vettori	Bangabandhu National Stadium, Dhaka	New Zealand by 83 runs

=== Sri Lanka in Pakistan ===
No.	Date	Home captain	Away captain	Venue	Result
Test series
Test 1716	20–24 October	Inzamam-ul-Haq	Marvan Atapattu	Iqbal Stadium, Faisalabad	Sri Lanka by 201 runs
Test 1719	28 October–1 November	Inzamam-ul-Haq	Marvan Atapattu	National Stadium, Karachi	Pakistan by 6 wickets

== November ==
=== BCCI Platinum Jubilee Match ===
No.	Date	Home captain	Away captain	Venue	Result
Only ODI
ODI 2192	13 November	Sourav Ganguly	Inzamam-ul-Haq	Eden Gardens, Kolkata	Pakistan by 6 wickets

=== New Zealand in Australia ===
No.	Date	Home captain	Away captain	Venue	Result
Test series
Test 1721	18–21 November	Ricky Ponting	Stephen Fleming	The Gabba, Brisbane	Australia by innings and 156 runs
Test 1723	26–30 November	Ricky Ponting	Stephen Fleming	Adelaide Oval, Adelaide	Australia by 213 runs
ODI series
ODI 2196	5 December	Ricky Ponting	Stephen Fleming	Docklands Stadium, Melbourne	New Zealand by 4 wickets
ODI 2198	8 December	Ricky Ponting	Stephen Fleming	Sydney Cricket Ground, Sydney	Australia by 17 runs
ODI 2198a	10 December	Ricky Ponting	Stephen Fleming	The Gabba, Brisbane	Match abandoned

=== South Africa In India ===
No.	Date	Home captain	Away captain	Venue	Result
Test series
Test 1722	20–24 November	Sourav Ganguly	Graeme Smith	Green Park Stadium, Kanpur	Match drawn
Test 1724	28 November–2 December	Sourav Ganguly	Graeme Smith	Eden Gardens, Kolkata	India by 8 wickets

=== England in Zimbabwe ===
No.	Date	Home captain	Away captain	Venue	Result
ODI series
ODI 2193	28 November	Tatenda Taibu	Michael Vaughan	Harare Sports Club, Harare	England by 5 wickets
ODI 2194	1 December	Tatenda Taibu	Michael Vaughan	Harare Sports Club, Harare	England by 161 runs
ODI 2195	4 December	Tatenda Taibu	Michael Vaughan	Queens Sports Club, Bulawayo	England by 8 wickets
ODI 2197	5 December	Tatenda Taibu	Michael Vaughan	Queens Sports Club, Bulawayo	England by 74 runs

== December ==
=== India in Bangladesh ===
No.	Date	Home captain	Away captain	Venue	Result
Test series
Test 1725	10–13 December	Habibul Bashar	Sourav Ganguly	Bangabandhu National Stadium, Dhaka	India by innings and 140 runs
Test 1727	17–20 December	Habibul Bashar	Sourav Ganguly	MA Aziz Stadium, Chittagong	India by innings and 83 runs
ODI series
ODI 2199	23 December	Habibul Bashar	Sourav Ganguly	MA Aziz Stadium, Chittagong	India by 11 runs
ODI 2201	26 December	Habibul Bashar	Sourav Ganguly	Bangabandhu National Stadium, Dhaka	Bangladesh by 15 runs
ODI 2202	27 December	Habibul Bashar	Sourav Ganguly	Bangabandhu National Stadium, Dhaka	India by 91 runs

=== Pakistan in Australia ===
No.	Date	Home captain	Away captain	Venue	Result
Test series
Test 1726	16–19 December	Ricky Ponting	Inzamam-ul-Haq	WACA Ground, Perth	Australia by 491 runs
Test 1729	26–29 December	Ricky Ponting	Mohammad Yousuf	Melbourne Cricket Ground, Melbourne	Australia by 9 wickets
Test 1731	2–5 January	Ricky Ponting	Mohammad Yousuf	Sydney Cricket Ground, Sydney	Australia by 9 wickets

=== England in South Africa ===
No.	Date	Home captain	Away captain	Venue	Result
Test series
Test 1728	17–21 December	Graeme Smith	Michael Vaughan	St. George's Park, Port Elizabeth	England by 7 wickets
Test 1730	26–30 December	Graeme Smith	Michael Vaughan	Kingsmead, Durban	Match drawn
Test 1732	2–6 January	Graeme Smith	Michael Vaughan	Newlands, Cape Town	South Africa by 196 runs
Test 1734	13–17 January	Graeme Smith	Michael Vaughan	New Wanderers Stadium, Johannesburg	England by 77 runs
Test 1736	21–25 January	Graeme Smith	Michael Vaughan	SuperSport Park, Centurion	Match drawn
ODI series
ODI 2216	30 January	Graeme Smith	Michael Vaughan	New Wanderers Stadium, Johannesburg	England by 26 runs (D/L)
ODI 2219	2 February	Graeme Smith	Michael Vaughan	Goodyear Park, Bloemfontein	Match tied
ODI 2221	4 February	Graeme Smith	Marcus Trescothick	St. George's Park, Port Elizabeth	South Africa by 3 wickets
ODI 2223	6 February	Graeme Smith	Michael Vaughan	Newlands, Cape Town	South Africa by 108 runs
ODI 2224	9 February	Graeme Smith	Michael Vaughan	Buffalo Park, East London	South Africa by 7 runs
ODI 2225	11 February	Graeme Smith	Michael Vaughan	Kingsmead, Durban	No result
ODI 2226	13 February	Graeme Smith	Michael Vaughan	SuperSport Park, Centurion	South Africa by 3 wickets

=== Sri Lanka in New Zealand ===
The second to fifth ODIs were cancelled to allow the Sri Lankan team to return home following the 2004 Indian Ocean earthquake and tsunami on 26 December.

No.	Date	Home captain	Away captain	Venue	Result
ODI series
ODI 2200	26 December	Stephen Fleming	Marvan Atapattu	Eden Park, Auckland	New Zealand by 7 wickets
ODI 2202a	29 December	Stephen Fleming	Marvan Atapattu	McLean Park, Napier	Match cancelled
ODI 2202b	2 January	Stephen Fleming	Marvan Atapattu	Queenstown Events Centre, Queenstown	Match cancelled
ODI 2202c	4 January	Stephen Fleming	Marvan Atapattu	Jade Stadium, Christchurch	Match cancelled
ODI 2202d	8 January	Stephen Fleming	Marvan Atapattu	Westpac Stadium, Wellington	Match cancelled
Test series
Test 1746	4–8 April	Stephen Fleming	Marvan Atapattu	McLean Park, Napier	Match drawn
Test 1748	11–14 April	Stephen Fleming	Marvan Atapattu	Basin Reserve, Wellington	New Zealand by an innings and 38 runs

== January ==
=== Zimbabwe in Bangladesh ===
No.	Date	Home captain	Away captain	Venue	Result
Test series
Test 1733	6–10 January	Habibul Bashar	Tatenda Taibu	MA Aziz Stadium, Chittagong	Bangladesh by 226 runs
Test 1735	14–18 January	Habibul Bashar	Tatenda Taibu	Bangabandhu National Stadium, Dhaka	Match drawn
ODI series
ODI 2207	20 January	Habibul Bashar	Tatenda Taibu	Bangabandhu National Stadium, Dhaka	Zimbabwe by 22 runs
ODI 2210	24 January	Habibul Bashar	Tatenda Taibu	MA Aziz Stadium, Chittagong	Zimbabwe by 31 runs
ODI 2211	26 January	Habibul Bashar	Tatenda Taibu	MA Aziz Stadium, Chittagong	Bangladesh by 40 runs
ODI 2214	29 January	Habibul Bashar	Tatenda Taibu	Bangabandhu National Stadium, Dhaka	Bangladesh by 58 runs
ODI 2217	31 January	Habibul Bashar	Tatenda Taibu	Bangabandhu National Stadium, Dhaka	Bangladesh by 8 wickets

=== World Cricket Tsunami Appeal ===
No.	Date	ICC World XI captain	Asia XI captain	Venue	Result
Only ODI
ODI 2203	10 January	Ricky Ponting	Sourav Ganguly	Melbourne Cricket Ground, Melbourne	ICC World XI by 112 runs

=== VB Series ===
Pos	Team	Pld	W	NR	L	BP	Pts	NRR
1	Australia	6	4	1	1	3	27	+1.082
2	Pakistan	6	3	0	3	2	17	–0.295
3	West Indies	6	1	1	4	2	10	–0.718

No.	Date	Team 1	Captain 1	Team 2	Captain 2	Venue	Result
Group stage
ODI 2204	14 January	Australia	Ricky Ponting	West Indies	Brian Lara	Melbourne Cricket Ground, Melbourne	Australia by 116 runs
ODI 2205	16 January	Australia	Ricky Ponting	Pakistan	Inzamam-ul-Haq	Bellerive Oval, Hobart	Australia by 4 wickets (D/L)
ODI 2206	19 January	West Indies	Brian Lara	Pakistan	Inzamam-ul-Haq	The Gabba, Brisbane	Pakistan by 6 wickets
ODI 2208	21 January	Australia	Ricky Ponting	West Indies	Brian Lara	The Gabba, Brisbane	No result
ODI 2209	23 January	Australia	Ricky Ponting	Pakistan	Inzamam-ul-Haq	Sydney Cricket Ground, Sydney	Australia by 9 wickets
ODI 2212	26 January	Australia	Ricky Ponting	West Indies	Brian Lara	Adelaide Oval, Adelaide	Australia by 73 runs
ODI 2213	28 January	Pakistan	Inzamam-ul-Haq	West Indies	Brian Lara	Adelaide Oval, Adelaide	West Indies by 58 runs
ODI 2215	30 January	Australia	Ricky Ponting	Pakistan	Inzamam-ul-Haq	WACA Ground, Perth	Pakistan by 3 wickets
ODI 2218	1 February	Pakistan	Inzamam-ul-Haq	West Indies	Brian Lara	WACA Ground, Perth	Pakistan by 30 runs
Finals
ODI 2220	4 February	Australia	Ricky Ponting	Pakistan	Inzamam-ul-Haq	Melbourne Cricket Ground, Melbourne	Australia by 18 runs
ODI 2222	6 February	Australia	Ricky Ponting	Pakistan	Inzamam-ul-Haq	Sydney Cricket Ground, Sydney	Australia by 31 runs

== February ==
=== Australia in New Zealand ===
No.	Date	Home captain	Away captain	Venue	Result
Only T20I
T20I 1	17 February	Stephen Fleming	Ricky Ponting	Eden Park, Auckland	Australia by 44 runs
ODI series
ODI 2227	19 February	Stephen Fleming	Ricky Ponting	Westpac Stadium, Wellington	Australia by 10 runs
ODI 2228	22 February	Stephen Fleming	Ricky Ponting	Jade Stadium, Christchurch	Australia by 106 runs
ODI 2230	26 February	Stephen Fleming	Ricky Ponting	Eden Park, Auckland	Australia by 86 runs
ODI 2232	1 March	Stephen Fleming	Adam Gilchrist	Basin Reserve, Wellington	Australia by 7 wickets
ODI 2234	5 March	Stephen Fleming	Ricky Ponting	McLean Park, Napier	Australia by 122 runs
Test series
Test 1739	10–13 March	Stephen Fleming	Ricky Ponting	Jade Stadium, Christchurch	Australia by 9 wickets
Test 1742	18–22 March	Stephen Fleming	Ricky Ponting	Basin Reserve, Wellington	Match drawn
Test 1744	26–29 March	Stephen Fleming	Ricky Ponting	Eden Park, Auckland	Australia by 9 wickets

=== Zimbabwe in South Africa ===
No.	Date	Home captain	Away captain	Venue	Result
ODI series
ODI 2229	25 February	Graeme Smith	Tatenda Taibu	New Wanderers Stadium, Johannesburg	South Africa by 165 runs
ODI 2231	27 February	Graeme Smith	Tatenda Taibu	Kingsmead, Durban	South Africa by 131 runs
ODI 2233	2 March	Nicky Boje	Tatenda Taibu	St George's Park, Port Elizabeth	South Africa by 5 wickets
Test series
Test 1737	4–5 March	Graeme Smith	Tatenda Taibu	Newlands, Cape Town	South Africa by an innings and 21 runs
Test 1740	11–13 March	Graeme Smith	Tatenda Taibu	SuperSport Park, Centurion	South Africa by an innings and 62 runs

== March ==
=== Pakistan in India ===
No.	Date	Home captain	Away captain	Venue	Result
Test series
Test 1738	8–12 March	Sourav Ganguly	Inzamam-ul-Haq	Punjab Cricket Association Stadium, Mohali	Match drawn
Test 1741	16–20 March	Sourav Ganguly	Inzamam-ul-Haq	Eden Gardens, Kolkata	India by 195 runs
Test 1743	24–28 March	Sourav Ganguly	Inzamam-ul-Haq	M. Chinnaswamy Stadium, Bangalore	Pakistan by 168 runs
ODI series
ODI 2235	2 April	Sourav Ganguly	Inzamam-ul-Haq	Nehru Stadium, Kochi	India by 87 runs
ODI 2236	5 April	Sourav Ganguly	Inzamam-ul-Haq	ACA-VDCA Stadium, Visakhapatnam	India by 58 runs
ODI 2237	9 April	Sourav Ganguly	Inzamam-ul-Haq	Keenan Stadium, Jamshedpur	Pakistan by 106 runs
ODI 2238	12 April	Sourav Ganguly	Inzamam-ul-Haq	Sardar Patel Stadium, Ahmedabad	Pakistan by 3 wickets
ODI 2239	15 April	Rahul Dravid	Inzamam-ul-Haq	Green Park Stadium, Kanpur	Pakistan by 5 wickets
ODI 2240	17 April	Rahul Dravid	Inzamam-ul-Haq	Feroz Shah Kotla Ground, Delhi	Pakistan by 159 runs

=== South Africa in the West Indies ===
No.	Date	Home captain	Away captain	Venue	Result
Test series
Test 1745	31 March–4 April	Shivnarine Chanderpaul	Graeme Smith	Bourda, Georgetown, Guyana	Match drawn
Test 1747	8–12 April	Shivnarine Chanderpaul	Graeme Smith	Queen's Park Oval, Port of Spain, Trinidad	South Africa by 8 wickets
Test 1749	21–24 April	Shivnarine Chanderpaul	Graeme Smith	Kensington Oval, Bridgetown, Barbados	South Africa by an innings and 86 runs
Test 1750	29 April–3 May	Shivnarine Chanderpaul	Graeme Smith	Antigua Recreation Ground, St John's, Antigua	Match drawn
ODI series
ODI 2241	7 May	Shivnarine Chanderpaul	Graeme Smith	Sabina Park, Kingston, Jamaica	South Africa by 8 wickets
ODI 2242	8 May	Shivnarine Chanderpaul	Graeme Smith	Sabina Park, Kingston, Jamaica	South Africa by 8 wickets (D/L)
ODI 2243	11 May	Shivnarine Chanderpaul	Graeme Smith	Kensington Oval, Bridgetown, Barbados	South Africa by 1 run
ODI 2244	14 May	Shivnarine Chanderpaul	Shaun Pollock	Queen's Park Oval, Port of Spain, Trinidad	South Africa by 6 wickets
ODI 2245	15 May	Shivnarine Chanderpaul	Shaun Pollock	Queen's Park Oval, Port of Spain, Trinidad	South Africa by 7 wickets
