= New Zealand cricket team in Sri Lanka in 2003 =

| | Sri Lanka | New Zealand |
- Dates: 25 April – 7 May 2003
| Captains | Hashan Tillakaratne | Stephen Fleming |

Test series
- Result: 2-match series drawn 0–0
| Most runs | Hashan Tillakaratne (237) | Stephen Fleming (376) |
| Most wickets | Muthiah Muralidaran (13) | Paul Wiseman (6) |
- Player of the series: Stephen Fleming (NZ)

The New Zealand national cricket team toured Sri Lanka during the 2003 season, playing two Tests from 25 April to 7 May 2003. New Zealand was led by Stephen Fleming while Sri Lanka was led by Hashan Tillakaratne. Both tests were drawn.

New Zealand then competed against Sri Lanka and Pakistan in a triangular one-day tournament called the Bank Alfalah Cup. New Zealand won the tournament defeating Pakistan in the final.

== Tour matches ==
=== Sri Lanka Board President's XI v New Zealanders ===
19–20 April 2003
Scorecard

| Sri Lanka Board President's XI | v | New Zealanders |
| 258 (64.5 overs); Mahela Jayawardene 108 (137); Daryl Tuffey 54/5 (14.5 overs) | | 396 (107.5 overs); Mark Richardson 106 (217); Dinusha Fernando 66/3 (20 overs) |

Match drawn
Nondescripts Cricket Club Ground, Colombo
Umpires: Ciril Rodrigo (SL) and Lalith Jayasundara (SL)

- Sri Lanka Board President's XI and elected to bat first

=== Sri Lanka A v New Zealanders ===
21–22 April 2003
Scorecard

| Sri Lanka A | v | New Zealanders |
| 284 (80.3 overs); Upul Chandana 55 (62); Daniel Vettori 72/3 (19 overs) | | 283 (84.5 overs); Mark Richardson 93 (171); Upul Chandana 98/5 (33 overs) |

Match drawn
Nondescripts Cricket Club Ground, Colombo
Umpires: Karunaratne Boteju (SL) and S Amarasinghe (SL)

- Sri Lanka A won the toss and elected to bat first

== Test series summary ==
=== 1st Test ===
25–29 April 2003
Scorecard

| New Zealand | v | Sri Lanka |
| 515/7dec (174.5 overs); SP Fleming 274* (476); HDPK Dharmasena 3/132 (40 overs) | | 483 (152 overs); HP Tillakaratne 144 (314); DL Vettori 3/94 (33 overs) |
| 161/5dec (78 overs); SP Fleming 69* (234); M Muralitharan 3/41 (30 overs) |

Match drawn
Paikiasothy Saravanamuttu Stadium, Colombo
Umpires: DJ Harper (AUS) and SJA Taufel (AUS)

- New Zealand won the toss and elected to bat.
- KS Lokuarachchi and RAP Nissanka (both SL) made their Test debuts.

=== 2nd Test ===
3–7 May 2003
Scorecard

| New Zealand | v | Sri Lanka |
| 305 (111.5 overs); JDP Oram 74 (179); M Muralitharan 3/90 (34 overs) | | 298 (97.3 overs); HP Tillakaratne 93 (232); PJ Wiseman 4/104 (32.3 overs) |
| 183 (97.3 overs); MH Richardson 55 (101); M Muralitharan 5/49 (39 overs) | | 72/1 (30 overs); DPMD Jayawardene 32* (78); SE Bond 1/19 (6 overs) |

Match drawn
Asgiriya Stadium, Kandy
Umpires: DJ Harper (AUS) and SJA Taufel (AUS)

- New Zealand won the toss and elected to bat.
- There was no play on the first day.
