= International cricket in 2005–06 =

Cricket season

The international cricket season in 2005–06 lasted from October 2005 to April 2006. The season included the ICC Super Series which was held in Australia.

== Season overview ==
International tours
Start date	Home team	Away team	Results [Matches]		
Start date	Home team	Away team	Test	ODI	T20I
5 October 2005	Australia	ICC World XI	1–0 [1]	3–0 [3]	—
21 October 2005	South Africa	New Zealand	2–0 [3]	4–0 [5]	0–1 [1]
25 October 2005	India	Sri Lanka	2–0 [3]	6–1 [7]	—
3 November 2005	Australia	West Indies	3–0 [3]	—	—
12 November 2005	Pakistan	England	2–0 [3]	3–2 [5]	—
16 November 2005	India	South Africa	—	2–2 [5]	—
3 December 2005	New Zealand	Australia	—	1–2 [3]	—
16 December 2005	Australia	South Africa	2–0 [3]	—	1–0 [1]
16 December 2005	New Zealand	Sri Lanka	—	3–1 [4]	—
14 January 2006	Pakistan	India	1–0 [3]	1–4 [5]	—
16 February 2006	New Zealand	West Indies	2–0 [3]	4–1 [5]	1–0 [1]
20 February 2006	Bangladesh	Sri Lanka	0–2 [2]	1–2 [3]	—
24 February 2006	South Africa	Australia	0–3 [3]	3–2 [5]	1–0 [1]
25 February 2006	Zimbabwe	Kenya	—	2–2 [5]	—
1 March 2006	India	England	1–1 [3]	5–1 [7]	—
17 March 2006	Bangladesh	Kenya	—	4–0 [4]	—
17 March 2006	Sri Lanka	Pakistan	0–1 [2]	0–2 [3]	—
9 April 2006	Bangladesh	Australia	0–2 [2]	0–3 [3]	—
International tournaments
Dates	Tournament			Winners	
13 January 2006	(Australia) VB Series			Australia	

== Rankings ==
The following are the rankings at the start of the season.

ICC Test Championship Table at 31 August			ICC ODI Championship Table at 31 August		
Pos	Nation	Points	Pos	Nation	Points
1	Australia	133	1	Australia	136
2	England	114	2	Sri Lanka	122
3	India	111	3	New Zealand	118
4	South Africa	100	4	India	116
5	New Zealand	100	5	South Africa	111
6	Sri Lanka	98	6	England	109
7	Pakistan	95	7	Pakistan	95
8	West Indies	74	8	West Indies	90
9	Zimbabwe	28	9	Zimbabwe	44
10	Bangladesh	6	10	Bangladesh	15

== October 2005 ==
=== ICC Super Series ===
No.	Date	Home captain	Away captain	Venue	Result
ODI Series
ODI 2282	5 October	Ricky Ponting	Shaun Pollock	Docklands Stadium, Melbourne	Australia by 93 runs
ODI 2283	7 October	Ricky Ponting	Shaun Pollock	Docklands Stadium, Melbourne	Australia by 55 runs
ODI 2284	9 October	Ricky Ponting	Shaun Pollock	Docklands Stadium, Melbourne	Australia by 156 runs
Supertest Series
Test 1768	14–17 October	Ricky Ponting	Graeme Smith	Sydney Cricket Ground, Sydney	Australia by 210 runs

=== New Zealand in South Africa ===
No.	Date	Home captain	Away captain	Venue	Result
T20 Series
T20I 3	21 October	Graeme Smith	Stephen Fleming	New Wanderers Stadium, Johannesburg	New Zealand by 5 wickets
ODI Series
ODI 2285	23 October	Graeme Smith	Stephen Fleming	Goodyear Park, Bloemfontein	South Africa by 2 wickets
ODI 2288	28 October	Graeme Smith	Stephen Fleming	Newlands, Cape Town	South Africa by 19 runs
ODI 2289	30 October	Graeme Smith	Stephen Fleming	St George's Park, Port Elizabeth	South Africa by 4 wickets
ODI 2292	4 November	Graeme Smith	Stephen Fleming	Kingsmead, Durban	No result
ODI 2293	6 November	Graeme Smith	Stephen Fleming	SuperSport Park, Centurion	South Africa by 5 wickets
Test Series
Test 1798	15–19 April	Graeme Smith	Stephen Fleming	SuperSport Park, Centurion	South Africa by 128 runs
Test 1800	27 April–1 May	Graeme Smith	Stephen Fleming	Newlands, Cape Town	Match drawn
Test 1801	5–7 May	Graeme Smith	Stephen Fleming	New Wanderers Stadium, Johannesburg	South Africa by 4 wickets

=== Sri Lanka in India ===
No.	Date	Home captain	Away captain	Venue	Result
ODI Series
ODI 2286	25 October	Rahul Dravid	Marvan Atapattu	Vidarbha Cricket Association Ground, Nagpur	India by 152 runs
ODI 2287	28 October	Rahul Dravid	Marvan Atapattu	Punjab Cricket Association Stadium, Mohali	India by 8 wickets
ODI 2290	31 October	Rahul Dravid	Marvan Atapattu	Sawai Mansingh Stadium, Jaipur	India by 6 wickets
ODI 2291	3 November	Rahul Dravid	Marvan Atapattu	Nehru Stadium, Pune	India by 4 wickets
ODI 2294	6 November	Rahul Dravid	Marvan Atapattu	Sardar Patel Stadium, Ahmedabad	Sri Lanka by 5 wickets
ODI 2295	9 November	Virender Sehwag	Marvan Atapattu	Madhavrao Scindia Cricket Ground, Rajkot	India by 7 wickets
ODI 2296	12 November	Rahul Dravid	Marvan Atapattu	IPCL Ground, Vadodara	India by 5 wickets
Test Series
Test 1775	2–6 December	Rahul Dravid	Marvan Atapattu	M. A. Chidambaram Stadium, Chennai	Match drawn
Test 1776	10–14 December	Rahul Dravid	Marvan Atapattu	Feroz Shah Kotla Ground, Delhi	India by 188 runs
Test 1778	18–22 December	Virender Sehwag	Marvan Atapattu	Sardar Patel Stadium, Ahmedabad	India by 259 runs

== November 2005 ==
=== West Indies in Australia ===
No.	Date	Home captain	Away captain	Venue	Result
Test Series
Test 1769	3–6 November	Ricky Ponting	Shivnarine Chanderpaul	The Gabba, Brisbane	Australia by 379 runs
Test 1771	17–21 November	Ricky Ponting	Shivnarine Chanderpaul	Bellerive Oval, Hobart	Australia by 9 wickets
Test 1773	25–29 November	Ricky Ponting	Shivnarine Chanderpaul	Adelaide Oval, Adelaide	Australia by 7 wickets

=== England in Pakistan ===
No.	Date	Home captain	Away captain	Venue	Result
Test Series
Test 1770	12–16 November	Inzamam-ul-Haq	Marcus Trescothick	Multan Cricket Stadium, Multan	Pakistan by 22 runs
Test 1772	20–24 November	Inzamam-ul-Haq	Michael Vaughan	Iqbal Stadium, Faisalabad	Match drawn
Test 1774	29 November–3 December	Inzamam-ul-Haq	Michael Vaughan	Gaddafi Stadium, Lahore	Pakistan by an innings and 100 runs
ODI Series
ODI 2304	10 December	Inzamam-ul-Haq	Marcus Trescothick	Gaddafi Stadium, Lahore	England by 42 runs
ODI 2305	12 December	Inzamam-ul-Haq	Marcus Trescothick	Gaddafi Stadium, Lahore	Pakistan by 7 wickets
ODI 2306	15 December	Inzamam-ul-Haq	Marcus Trescothick	National Stadium, Karachi	Pakistan by 165 runs
ODI 2307	19 December	Inzamam-ul-Haq	Marcus Trescothick	Rawalpindi Cricket Stadium, Rawalpindi	Pakistan by 13 runs
ODI 2308	21 December	Younis Khan	Marcus Trescothick	Rawalpindi Cricket Stadium, Rawalpindi	England by 6 runs

=== South Africa in India ===
No.	Date	Home captain	Away captain	Venue	Result
ODI Series
ODI 2297	16 November	Rahul Dravid	Graeme Smith	Rajiv Gandhi International Stadium, Hyderabad	South Africa by 5 wickets
ODI 2298	19 November	Rahul Dravid	Graeme Smith	M. Chinnaswamy Stadium, Bangalore	India by 6 wickets
ODI 2298a	22 November	Rahul Dravid	Graeme Smith	M. A. Chidambaram Stadium, Chennai	No Result
ODI 2299	25 November	Rahul Dravid	Graeme Smith	Eden Gardens, Kolkata	South Africa by 10 wickets
ODI 2300	28 November	Rahul Dravid	Graeme Smith	Wankhede Stadium, Mumbai	India by 5 wickets

== December 2005 ==
=== Australia in New Zealand ===
No.	Date	Home captain	Away captain	Venue	Result
ODI Series
ODI 2301	3 December	Daniel Vettori	Ricky Ponting	Eden Park, Auckland	Australia by 147 runs
ODI 2302	7 December	Daniel Vettori	Ricky Ponting	Westpac Stadium, Wellington	Australia by 2 runs
ODI 2303	10 December	Daniel Vettori	Ricky Ponting	Jade Stadium, Christchurch	New Zealand by 2 wickets

=== South Africa in Australia ===
No.	Date	Home captain	Away captain	Venue	Result
Test Series
Test 1777	16–20 December	Ricky Ponting	Graeme Smith	WACA Ground, Perth	Match drawn
Test 1779	26–30 December	Ricky Ponting	Graeme Smith	Melbourne Cricket Ground, Melbourne	Australia by 184 runs
Test 1780	2–6 January	Ricky Ponting	Graeme Smith	Sydney Cricket Ground, Sydney	Australia by 8 wickets
T20 Series
T20I 4	9 January	Ricky Ponting	Graeme Smith	The Gabba, Brisbane	Australia by 95 runs

=== Sri Lanka in New Zealand ===
No.	Date	Home captain	Away captain	Venue	Result
ODI Series
ODI 2309	31 December	Daniel Vettori	Marvan Atapattu	Queenstown Events Centre, Queenstown	New Zealand by 7 wickets
ODI 2310	3 January	Daniel Vettori	Marvan Atapattu	Jade Stadium, Christchurch	New Zealand by 5 wickets
ODI 2311	6 January	Stephen Fleming	Marvan Atapattu	Westpac Stadium, Wellington	New Zealand by 21 runs
ODI 2312	8 January	Stephen Fleming	Marvan Atapattu	McLean Park, Napier	Sri Lanka by 20 runs

== January 2006 ==
=== VB Series ===
Team	M	W	L	NR	BP	Pts	NRR
Australia	8	6	2	0	3	27	+0.79
Sri Lanka	8	3	5	0	2	14	+0.03
South Africa	8	3	5	0	0	12	−0.08

No.	Date	Team 1	Captain	Team 2	Captain	Venue	Result
Group Stage
ODI 2313	13 January	Australia	Ricky Ponting	Sri Lanka	Marvan Atapattu	Docklands Stadium, Melbourne	Australia by 116 runs
ODI 2314	15 January	Australia	Ricky Ponting	South Africa	Graeme Smith	The Gabba, Brisbane	South Africa by 5 wickets
ODI 2315	17 January	Sri Lanka	Marvan Atapattu	South Africa	Graeme Smith	The Gabba, Brisbane	Sri Lanka by 94 runs
ODI 2316	20 January	Australia	Ricky Ponting	South Africa	Graeme Smith	Docklands Stadium, Melbourne	Australia by 59 runs
ODI 2317	22 January	Australia	Ricky Ponting	Sri Lanka	Marvan Atapattu	Sydney Cricket Ground, Sydney	Sri Lanka by 51 runs
ODI 2318	24 January	Sri Lanka	Marvan Atapattu	South Africa	Graeme Smith	Adelaide Oval, Adelaide	South Africa by 9 runs
ODI 2319	26 January	Australia	Adam Gilchrist	Sri Lanka	Marvan Atapattu	Adelaide Oval, Adelaide	Australia by 5 wickets
ODI 2320	29 January	Australia	Adam Gilchrist	Sri Lanka	Chaminda Vaas	WACA Ground, Perth	Australia by 6 wickets
ODI 2321	31 January	Sri Lanka	Marvan Atapattu	South Africa	Graeme Smith	WACA Ground, Perth	South Africa by 5 wickets
ODI 2322	3 February	Australia	Ricky Ponting	South Africa	Graeme Smith	Docklands Stadium, Melbourne	Australia by 80 runs
ODI 2323	5 February	Australia	Ricky Ponting	South Africa	Graeme Smith	Sydney Cricket Ground, Sydney	Australia by 57 runs
ODI 2325	7 February	Sri Lanka	Marvan Atapattu	South Africa	Graeme Smith	Bellerive Oval, Hobart	Sri Lanka by 76 runs
Finals
ODI 2326	10 February	Australia	Ricky Ponting	Sri Lanka	Marvan Atapattu	Adelaide Oval, Adelaide	Sri Lanka by 22 runs
ODI 2328	12 February	Australia	Ricky Ponting	Sri Lanka	Marvan Atapattu	Sydney Cricket Ground, Sydney	Australia by 167 runs
ODI 2330	14 February	Australia	Ricky Ponting	Sri Lanka	Marvan Atapattu	The Gabba, Brisbane	Australia by 9 wickets

=== India in Pakistan ===
No.	Date	Home captain	Away captain	Venue	Result
Test Match Series
Test 1781	14–18 January	Inzamam-ul-Haq	Rahul Dravid	Gaddafi Stadium, Lahore	Match Drawn
Test 1782	22–26 January	Inzamam-ul-Haq	Rahul Dravid	Iqbal Stadium, Faisalabad	Match Drawn
Test 1783	30 January-3 February	Younis Khan	Rahul Dravid	National Stadium, Karachi	Pakistan by 341 runs
One-Day International Series
ODI 2324	6 February	Inzamam-ul-Haq	Rahul Dravid	Arbab Niaz Stadium, Peshawar	Pakistan by 7 runs (D/L)
ODI 2327	9 February	Inzamam-ul-Haq	Rahul Dravid	Rawalpindi Cricket Stadium, Rawalpindi	India by 7 wkts
ODI 2329	13 February	Inzamam-ul-Haq	Rahul Dravid	Gaddafi Stadium, Lahore	India by 5 wkts
ODI 2331	16 February	Inzamam-ul-Haq	Rahul Dravid	Multan Cricket Stadium, Multan	India by 5 wkts
ODI 2333	19 February	Inzamam-ul-Haq	Rahul Dravid	National Stadium, Karachi	India by 8 wkts

== February 2006 ==
=== Asia Cup ===
The Asia Cup was postponed due to India's busy cricket schedule at the time.

=== West Indies in New Zealand ===
No.	Date	Home captain	Away captain	Venue	Result
Twenty20 International
T20I 5	16 February	Stephen Fleming	Shivnarine Chanderpaul	Eden Park, Auckland	Match Tied, New Zealand win bowl-off 3–0
One-Day International Series
ODI 2332	18 February	Stephen Fleming	Shivnarine Chanderpaul	Westpac Stadium, Wellington	New Zealand by 81 runs
ODI 2335	22 February	Stephen Fleming	Shivnarine Chanderpaul	Queenstown Events Centre, Queenstown	New Zealand by 3 wickets
ODI 2337	25 February	Stephen Fleming	Shivnarine Chanderpaul	Jade Stadium, Christchurch	New Zealand by 21 runs
ODI 2342	1 March	Stephen Fleming	Shivnarine Chanderpaul	McLean Park, Napier	New Zealand by 91 runs
ODI 2346	4 March	Stephen Fleming	Shivnarine Chanderpaul	Eden Park, Auckland	West Indies by 3 wickets
Test Match Series
Test 1787	9–13 March	Stephen Fleming	Shivnarine Chanderpaul	Eden Park, Auckland	New Zealand by 27 runs
Test 1790	17–21 March	Stephen Fleming	Shivnarine Chanderpaul	Basin Reserve, Wellington	New Zealand by 10 wkts
Test 1793	25–29 March	Stephen Fleming	Shivnarine Chanderpaul	McLean Park, Napier	Match Drawn

=== Sri Lanka in Bangladesh ===
No.	Date	Home captain	Away captain	Venue	Result
One-Day International Series
ODI 2334	20 February	Habibul Bashar	Mahela Jayawardene	Shaheed Chandu Stadium, Bogra	Sri Lanka by 5 wkts
ODI 2336	22 February	Habibul Bashar	Mahela Jayawardene	Shaheed Chandu Stadium, Bogra	Bangladesh by 4 wkts
ODI 2338	25 February	Habibul Bashar	Mahela Jayawardene	Chittagong Divisional Stadium, Chittagong	Sri Lanka by 78 runs
Test Series
Test 1784	28 February–5 March	Habibul Bashar	Mahela Jayawardene	Chittagong Divisional Stadium, Chittagong	Sri Lanka by 8 wkts
Test 1786	8–12 March	Habibul Bashar	Mahela Jayawardene	Shaheed Chandu Stadium, Bogra	Sri Lanka by 10 wkts

=== Australia in South Africa ===
No.	Date	Home captain	Away captain	Venue	Result
Twenty20 International Schedule
T20I 6	24 February	Graeme Smith	Ricky Ponting	Wanderers Stadium, Johannesburg	South Africa by 2 runs
One-Day International Series Schedule
ODI 2341	26 February	Graeme Smith	Adam Gilchrist	SuperSport Park, Centurion	South Africa by 6 wkts
ODI 2345	3 March	Graeme Smith	Adam Gilchrist	Newlands, Cape Town	South Africa by 196 runs
ODI 2347	5 March	Graeme Smith	Ricky Ponting	St George's Park, Port Elizabeth	Australia by 24 runs
ODI 2348	10 March	Graeme Smith	Ricky Ponting	Sahara Stadium Kingsmead, Durban	Australia by 1 wkt
ODI 2349	12 March	Graeme Smith	Ricky Ponting	Wanderers Stadium, Johannesburg	South Africa by 1 wkt
Test Match Series Schedule
Test 1789	16–20 March	Graeme Smith	Ricky Ponting	Newlands, Cape Town	Australia by 7 wkts
Test 1793	24–28 March	Graeme Smith	Ricky Ponting	Sahara Stadium Kingsmead, Durban	Australia by 112 runs
Test 1795	31 March-4 April	Jacques Kallis	Ricky Ponting	Wanderers Stadium, Johannesburg	Australia by 2 wkts

=== Kenya in Zimbabwe ===
No.	Date	Home captain	Away captain	Venue	Result
One-Day International Series
ODI 2339	25 February	Terry Duffin	Steve Tikolo	Queens Sports Club, Bulawayo	Zimbabwe by 8 wkts
ODI 2340	26 February	Terry Duffin	Steve Tikolo	Queens Sports Club, Bulawayo	Kenya by 79 runs
ODI 2343	1 March	Terry Duffin	Steve Tikolo	Harare Sports Club, Harare	Kenya by 65 runs
ODI 2344	3 March	Terry Duffin	Steve Tikolo	Harare Sports Club, Harare	Zimbabwe by 109 runs
ODI 2346a	4 March	Terry Duffin	Steve Tikolo	Harare Sports Club, Harare	Match Abandoned

== March 2006 ==
=== England in India ===
No.	Date	Home captain	Away captain	Venue	Result
Test Match Series
Test 1785	1–5 March	Rahul Dravid	Andrew Flintoff	Vidarbha C.A. Ground, Nagpur	Match Drawn
Test 1788	9–13 March	Rahul Dravid	Andrew Flintoff	Punjab C.A. Stadium, Mohali	India by 9 wkts
Test 1791	18–22 March	Rahul Dravid	Andrew Flintoff	Wankhede Stadium, Mumbai	England by 212 runs
One-Day International Schedule
ODI 2357	28 March	Rahul Dravid	Andrew Flintoff	Feroz Shah Kotla, Delhi	India by 39 runs
ODI 2358	31 March	Rahul Dravid	Andrew Flintoff	Nahar Singh Stadium, Faridabad	India by 6 wkts
ODI 2359	3 April	Rahul Dravid	Andrew Flintoff	Nehru Stadium, Margao	India by 49 runs
ODI 2360	6 April	Rahul Dravid	Andrew Flintoff	Nehru Stadium. Kochi	India by 4 wkts
ODI 2360a	9 April	Rahul Dravid	Andrew Flintoff	Nehru Stadium, Guwahati	No Result
ODI 2361	12 April	Virender Sehwag	Andrew Strauss	Keenan Stadium, Jamshedpur	England by 5 wkts
ODI 2362	15 April	Rahul Dravid	Andrew Strauss	Maharani Usharaje Trust Cricket Ground, Indore	India by 7 wkts

=== Kenya in Bangladesh ===
No.	Date	Home captain	Away captain	Venue	Result
One-Day International Series
ODI 2350	17 March	Habibul Bashar	Steve Tikolo	Shaheed Chandu Stadium, Bogra	Bangladesh by 131 runs
ODI 2353	20 March	Habibul Bashar	Thomas Odoyo	Khulna Divisional Stadium, Khulna	Bangladesh by 9 wkts
ODI 2355	23 March	Habibul Bashar	Steve Tikolo	Fatullah Osmani Stadium, Fatullah	Bangladesh by 20 runs
ODI 2356	25 March	Habibul Bashar	Steve Tikolo	Fatullah Osmani Stadium, Fatullah	Bangladesh by 7 wkts

=== Pakistan in Sri Lanka ===
No.	Date	Home captain	Away captain	Venue	Result
One-Day International Series
ODI 2351	17 March	Marvan Atapattu	Inzamam-ul-Haq	R. Premadasa Stadium, Colombo	No Result
ODI 2352	19 March	Mahela Jayawardene	Inzamam-ul-Haq	R. Premadasa Stadium, Colombo	Pakistan by 4 wkts
ODI 2354	22 March	Mahela Jayawardene	Inzamam-ul-Haq	Sinhalese Sports Club Ground, Colombo	Pakistan by 4 wkts
Test Match Series
Test 1794	26–30 March	Mahela Jayawardene	Inzamam-ul-Haq	Sinhalese Sports Club Ground, Colombo	Match Drawn
Test 1796	3–7 April	Mahela Jayawardene	Inzamam-ul-Haq	Asgiriya Stadium, Kandy	Pakistan by 8 wkts

== April 2006 ==
=== Australia in Bangladesh ===
No.	Date	Home captain	Away captain	Venue	Result
Test Match Series Schedule
Test 1797	9–13 April	Habibul Bashar	Ricky Ponting	Fatullah Osmani Stadium, Fatullah	Australia by 3 wkts
Test 1799	16–20 April	Habibul Bashar	Ricky Ponting	Chittagong Divisional Stadium, Chittagong	Australia by Inns & 80 runs
One-Day International Schedule
ODI 2365	23 April	Habibul Bashar	Ricky Ponting	Chittagong Divisional Stadium, Chittagong	Australia by 4 wkts
ODI 2366	26 April	Habibul Bashar	Ricky Ponting	Fatullah Osmani Stadium, Fatullah	Australia by 64 runs
ODI 2367	28 April	Habibul Bashar	Adam Gilchrist	Fatullah Osmani Stadium, Fatullah	Australia by 9 wkts

=== New Zealand in South Africa (Test leg) ===
No.	Date	Home captain	Away captain	Venue	Result
Test Match Series Schedule
Test 1796	15–19 April	Graeme Smith	Stephen Fleming	SuperSport Park, Centurion	South Africa by 128 runs
Test 1799	27 April-1 May	Graeme Smith	Stephen Fleming	Newlands, Cape Town	Match Drawn
Test 1801	5–7 May	Graeme Smith	Stephen Fleming	Wanderers Stadium, Johannesburg	South Africa by 4 wkts

=== DLF Cup ===
No.	Date	India captain	Pakistan captain	Venue	Result
One-Day International Series Schedule
ODI 2363	18 April	Rahul Dravid	Inzamam-ul-Haq	Sheikh Zayed Cricket Stadium, Abu Dhabi	Pakistan by 6 wkts
ODI 2364	19 April	Rahul Dravid	Inzamam-ul-Haq	Sheikh Zayed Cricket Stadium, Abu Dhabi	India by 51 runs
