= Sri Lankan cricket team in South Africa in 2002–03 =

	South Africa	Sri Lanka
- Dates: 25 October 2002 – 18 March 2003
Captains	Shaun Pollock	Sanath Jayasuriya (1st Test); Marvan Atapattu (2nd Test)

Test series
- Result: South Africa won the 2-match series 2–0
Most runs	Jacques Kallis (165)	Hashan Tillakaratne (161)
Most wickets	Makhaya Ntini (12)	Dilhara Fernando (7); Muttiah Muralitharan (7)
- Player of the series: Jacques Kallis (SA)

The Sri Lankan cricket team toured South Africa from 25 October 2002 to 18 March 2003.

The Test series was won by South Africa, 2-0. South Africa won both the Tests played at Johannesburg and Centurion. Jacques Kallis was awarded the man of the series for having scored 165 runs at an average of 55.00 and bagging 10 wickets at an average of 18.50.

== Test Series ==
=== 1st Test ===
8–10 November 2002
Scorecard

Sri Lanka	v	South Africa
192 (75.3 overs); Mahela Jayawardene 39 (100); Jacques Kallis 3/35 (17 overs)		386 (104.4 overs); Jacques Kallis 75 (214); Hasantha Fernando 3/63 (21 overs)
130 (41 overs); Marvan Atapattu 43 (92); Andrew Hall 3/1 (2 overs)

South Africa won by an innings and 64 runs
Wanderers Stadium, Johannesburg
Umpires: Daryl Harper (AUS) and Russell Tiffin (ZIM)
Player of the match: Jacques Kallis (SA)

- Sri Lanka won the toss and elected to bat
- The match was scheduled for five days but completed in three.
- Test debut: Hasantha Fernando (SL)

=== 2nd Test ===
15–19 November 2002
Scorecard

Sri Lanka	v	South Africa
323 (108.5 overs); Hashan Tillakaratne 104* (231); Makhaya Ntini 4/86 (29 overs)		448 (166.3 overs); Shaun Pollock 99* (170); Chamila Gamage 2/71 (22 overs)
245 (77.2 overs); Kumar Sangakkara 89 (132); Jacques Kallis 4/39 (14.2 overs)		124/7 (35.3 overs); Neil McKenzie 39 (53); Dilhara Fernando 4/49 (12 overs)

South Africa won by 3 wickets
SuperSport Park, Centurion
Umpires: Daryl Harper (AUS) and Russell Tiffin (ZIM)
Player of the match: Shaun Pollock (SA)

- South Africa won the toss and elected to field

== One Day Internationals (ODIs) ==
=== 1st ODI ===
27 November 2002
Scorecard

Sri Lanka; 128 (46.4 overs)	v	South Africa; 129/4 (29.3 overs)
DPMD Jayawardene 31 (72); SM Pollock 4/18 (8.4 overs)		MV Boucher 45* (50); RAP Nissanka 2/33 (7 overs)

South Africa won by 6 wickets
New Wanderers, Johannesburg
Umpires: BG Jerling (SA) and RB Tiffin (ZIM)
Player of the match: SM Pollock (SA)

- South Africa won the toss and elected to field.
- J Mubarak (SL) made his ODI debut.

=== 2nd ODI ===
29 November 2002 (D/N)
Scorecard

South Africa; 317/6 (50 overs)	v	Sri Lanka; 140 (33.2 overs)
GC Smith 99 (106); PW Gunaratne 2/61 (10 overs)		ST Jayasuriya 46 (32); M Ntini 3/38 (10 overs)

South Africa won by 177 runs
Centurion Park, Centurion, Gauteng
Umpires: IL Howell (SA) and RB Tiffin (ZIM)
Player of the match: JH Kallis (SA)

- South Africa won the toss and elected to bat.
- Sri Lanka's innings was limited to 49 overs due to their slow over rate.

=== 3rd ODI ===
1 December 2002
Scorecard

South Africa; 253/7 (50 overs)	v	Sri Lanka; 258/3 (41.4 overs)
JH Kallis 87 (117); MKGCP Lakshitha 2/37 (7 overs)		MS Atapattu 123* (121); SM Pollock 1/42 (10 overs)

Sri Lanka won by 7 wickets
Willowmoore Park, Benoni, Gauteng
Umpires: BG Jerling (SA) and RB Tiffin (ZIM)
Player of the match: MS Atapattu (SL)

- Sri Lanka won the toss and elected to field.

=== 4th ODI ===
4 December 2002 (D/N)
Scorecard

Sri Lanka; 184 (47.3 overs)	v	South Africa; 190/2 (30.5 overs)
RP Arnold 50 (88); AA Donald 3/18 (10 overs)		HH Gibbs 108* (92); WPUJC Vaas 1/42 (9 overs)

South Africa won by 8 wickets
De Beers Diamond Oval, Kimberley, Northern Cape
Umpires: IL Howell (SA) and RB Tiffin (ZIM)
Player of the match: HH Gibbs (SA)

- South Africa won the toss and elected to field.

=== 5th ODI ===
6 December 2002 (D/N)
Scorecard

Sri Lanka; 228/8 (50 overs)	v	South Africa; 229/4 (45.1 overs)
KC Sangakkara 77* (115); SM Pollock 2/23 (10 overs)		ND McKenzie 70* (102); WPUJC Vaas 1/37 (10 overs)

South Africa won by 6 wickets
Goodyear Park, Bloemfontein
Umpires: BG Jerling (SA) and RB Tiffin (ZIM)
Player of the match: SM Pollock (SA)

- Sri Lanka won the toss and elected to bat.
- M Zondeki (SA) made his ODI debut.
