= Denham Madena =

Sri Lankan cricketer

Denham R. Madena is a former Sri Lankan cricketer. He captained his side on his debut for the Sri Lanka Under 19s during England's tour of Sri Lanka, against the England Under 19s. In the three match series, in which he captained all three matches, he drew all three matches. A bowler primarily, he did not go on to play First-class cricket.
