= Suchithra Alexander =

Sri Lankan cricketer (born 1972)

Cricket information
- Batting: Right-handed
- Bowling: Right-arm medium

Career statistics
Competition	First-class	List A
Matches	59	9
Runs scored	1,081	65
Batting average	20.39	16.25
100s/50s	0/5	0/0
Top score	83	25*
Balls bowled	4951	378
Wickets	97	7
Bowling average	29.16	28.42
5 wickets in innings	2	0
10 wickets in match	0	0
Best bowling	5/26	2/26
Catches/stumpings	38/–	5/–
- Source: CricketArchive, 1 November 2022

Suchithra Alexander (born 14 October 1972), is a former Sri Lankan cricketer. He captained his side on his debut for the Sri Lanka Under 19s during their tour of England, against the England Under 19s. In the three match series, in which he captained all three matches, he lost one and drew the other two. A bowler with the ability to add runs in the lower-middle order, scoring several half-centuries, he went on to play First-class cricket for Colts Cricket Club.
