= Sri Lankan cricket team in Pakistan in 2004–05 =

	Pakistan	Sri Lanka
- Dates: 6 October 2004 – 28 November 2004
Captains	Inzamam-ul-Haq	Marvan Atapattu

Test series
- Result: 2-match series drawn 1–1
Most runs	Shoaib Malik (204)	Sanath Jayasuriya (424)
Most wickets	Danish Kaneria (15)	Rangana Herath (11)
- Player of the series: Sanath Jayasuriya (Sri)

The Sri Lanka national cricket team toured Pakistan from 6 October to 28 November 2004. The tour consisted of two Test matches.

== Paktel Cup ==
Paktel Cup was a One Day International triangular cricket tournament, played amongst Pakistan, Sri Lanka and Zimbabwe. The tournament was held in Pakistan from 30 September 2004 to 16 October 2004. The tournament consisted of a round-robin stage, in which each nation played the others two times each. The top two teams (Pakistan and Sri Lanka) participated in the final of the series.

Group stage
Pos	Team	P	W	L	T	NR	NRR	Runs for (overs)	Runs against (overs)	Points
1	Pakistan	4	4	0	0	0	+0.612	1,080 (195.4)	925 (200.0)	21
2	Sri Lanka	4	1	2	0	1	+0.499	633 (118.1)	634 (147.3)	11
3	Zimbabwe	4	0	3	0	1	−1.508	504 (150.0)	658 (116.2)	4

== Test series ==
=== 1st Test ===
20–24 October 2004
Scorecard

Sri Lanka	v	Pakistan
243 (81.4 overs); Thilan Samaraweera 100 (232); Shoaib Akhtar 5/60 (19 overs)		264 (84.1 overs); Yasir Hameed 58 (102); Rangana Herath 3/68 (27.1 overs)
438 (109.2 overs); Sanath Jayasuriya 253 (348); Danish Kaneria 4/117 (38.2 overs)		216 (79.2 overs); Imran Farhat 53 (63); Rangana Herath 4/64 (32.2 overs)

Sri Lanka won by 201 runs
Iqbal Stadium, Faisalabad
Umpires: Billy Bowden (NZL) and Steve Bucknor (WIN)
Player of the match: Sanath Jayasuriya (Sri)

- Sri Lanka won the toss and elected to bat.

=== 2nd Test ===
28 October – 1 November 2004
Scorecard

Sri Lanka	v	Pakistan
208 (82.1 overs); Romesh Kaluwitharana 54 (104); Abdul Razzaq 5/35 (23.1 overs)		478 (137.1 overs); Younis Khan 124 (244); Dilhara Fernando 3/96 (22.1 overs)
406 (141.5 overs); Kumar Sangakkara 138 (251); Danish Kaneria 7/118 (60 overs)		139/4 (37 overs); Shoaib Malik 53* (60); Chaminda Vaas 2/45 (14 overs)

Pakistan won by 6 wickets
National Stadium, Karachi
Umpires: Billy Bowden (NZL) and Steve Bucknor (WIN)
Player of the match: Danish Kaneria (PAK)

- Pakistan won the toss and elected to field.
- Test debuts: Rana Naved-ul-Hasan and Riaz Afridi (Pakistan)
