= Hamish Marshall =

New Zealand cricketer

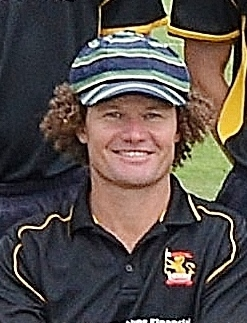

Personal information
- Full name: Hamish John Hamilton Marshall
- Born: 15 February 1979 (age 47); Warkworth, New Zealand
- Batting: Right-handed
- Bowling: Right-arm medium
- Role: Batsman
- Relatives: James Marshall (twin brother)

International information
- National side: New Zealand (2000–2007)
- Test debut (cap 213): 8 December 2000 v South Africa
- Last Test: 15 April 2006 v South Africa
- ODI debut (cap 132): 29 November 2003 v Pakistan
- Last ODI: 9 April 2007 v Ireland
- ODI shirt no.: 34
- T20I debut (cap 4): 17 February 2005 v Australia
- Last T20I: 16 February 2006 v West Indies

Domestic team information
- Years: Team
- 1998/99–2011/12: Northern Districts
- 2003: Buckinghamshire
- 2006–2016: Gloucestershire
- 2016/17–2017/18: Wellington

Career statistics
| Competition | Test | ODI | FC | LA |
|---|---|---|---|---|
| Matches | 13 | 66 | 264 | 312 |
| Runs scored | 652 | 1454 | 14,820 | 7,506 |
| Batting average | 38.35 | 27.43 | 36.59 | 27.80 |
| 100s/50s | 2/2 | 1/12 | 31/74 | 7/49 |
| Top score | 160 | 101* | 170 | 122 |
| Balls bowled | 6 | – | 3,787 | 284 |
| Wickets | 0 | – | 42 | 4 |
| Bowling average | – | – | 45.78 | 73.75 |
| 5 wickets in innings | – | – | 0 | 0 |
| 10 wickets in match | – | – | 0 | 0 |
| Best bowling | – | – | 4/24 | 2/21 |
| Catches/stumpings | 1/– | 18/– | 137/– | 116/– |
- Source: Cricinfo, 23 April 2017

Hamish John Hamilton Marshall (born 15 February 1979) is a former New Zealand cricketer, who played all formats of the game for New Zealand. He is the identical twin brother of James Marshall. Hamish and James became the third pair of twins (after Liz and Rose Signal of New Zealand in 1984, and Mark and Steve Waugh) to play Test cricket, and are the second identical pair.

Marshall, a middle-order batsman, made his Test debut against South Africa in December 2000. Batting at No. 7, he made an unbeaten 40. Marshall has also played for Northland in the Hawke Cup.

== Domestic career ==
=== Indian Cricket League ===
He played for the Royal Bengal Tigers in the Indian Cricket League until the ICL collapsed in mid-2009. In February 2009, Indian cricketers Sachin Tendulkar and Dinesh Karthik had to withdraw from playing in a friendly T20 cricket match between Australian Cricketers' Association and New Zealand Cricket Players Association, because of Marshall's involvement in the match. Due to the rivalry between the IPL and the ICL, the BCCI asked Tendulkar and Karthik not to play in the match. The BCCI cited the involvement of Marshall in one of the teams for not fielding its cricketers.

=== Ireland career ===
In October 2010, it was announced that Marshall would tour India with the Ireland cricket team. It was hoped that it would assist his integration into the team in the event the ICC allowed him to play for Ireland in ODIs.

=== Gloucestershire career ===
Marshall arrived at Gloucestershire County Cricket Club in 2006 and has played every season since. In 2015 he was awarded a benefit season.

In 2011, Both Hamish Marshall and Kevin O'Brien became the first pair of batsmen to score centuries in a single T20, when they did it for Gloucestershire

In June 2012, Marshall was appointed as Gloucestershire County Cricket Club's captain for their Twenty20 campaign.

In the 2013 County Season, Marshall passed 1000 County Championship runs for the first time since 2006, averaging 50.35. He was rewarded with a new three-year contract taking him to 37 years of age.

=== Wellington ===
In 2016, Marshall returned to New Zealand to play cricket for Wellington at 37 years of age. he was also planning to work selling insurance.

== International career ==
He waited another three years until he was called up for the one-day series in Pakistan in 2003–04. In his third game, he scored 101 not out at Faisalabad. In the corresponding home series he scored 64 and 84 to help New Zealand win the series. He helped New Zealand to win the 2003–04 home one-day series against South Africa, and was called up for the 2004 NatWest Series in England. He scored 75 not out and 55 in the group matches, before contributing 44 as New Zealand won the final against West Indies.

He scored his first Test century in March 2005 against Australia with an innings of 146. He then scored 160 against Sri Lanka in April.

Marshall was a late call-up for the 2007 Cricket World Cup, in which he scored one half-century. After the tournament, he chose to reject a contract with New Zealand in order to play for Gloucestershire, due to his Irish passport Marshall does not count as an overseas player so long as he does not play for New Zealand.

== Career best performances ==
Updated 13 January 2019

| | Batting | | | | Bowling (innings) | | | |
| | Score | Fixture | Venue | Season | Figures | Fixture | Venue | Season |
|---|---|---|---|---|---|---|---|---|
| Tests | 160 | New Zealand v Sri Lanka | Napier | 2005 | – | | | – |
| ODI | 101 not out | New Zealand v Pakistan | Faisalabad | 2003 | – | | | – |
| T20I | 8 | New Zealand v Australia | Auckland | 2005 | – | | | – |
| FC | 170 | Northern Districts v Canterbury | Rangiora | 2010 | 4/24 | Gloucestershire v Leicestershire | Leicester | 2010 |
| LA | 122 | Gloucestershire v Sussex | Hove | 2007 | 2/21 | Gloucestershire v Hampshire | Southampton | 2009 |
| T20 | 102 | Gloucestershire v Middlesex | Uxbridge | 2011 | – | | | – |
