= Farveez Maharoof =

Sri Lankan cricketer (born 1984)

Personal information
- Full name: Mohammad Farveez Maharoof
- Born: 7 September 1984 (age 42); Colombo, Sri Lanka
- Nickname: The Roof
- Height: 6 ft 3 in (1.91 m)
- Batting: Right-handed
- Bowling: Right-arm fast-medium
- Role: All-rounder

International information
- National side: Sri Lanka (2004–2016)
- Test debut (cap 98): 6 May 2004 v Zimbabwe
- Last Test: 3 June 2011 v England
- ODI debut (cap 121): 25 April 2004 v Zimbabwe
- Last ODI: 29 June 2016 v England
- ODI shirt no.: 28
- T20I debut (cap 7): 15 June 2006 v England
- Last T20I: 5 July 2016 v England

Domestic team information
- Years: Team
- 2003/04–2006/07: Bloomfield Cricket and Athletic Club
- 2007/08–2018: Nondescripts Cricket Club
- 2007/08: Wayamba
- 2007/08–2009/10: Delhi Daredevils
- 2011: Lancashire
- 2013: Barisal Burners
- 2017: Kathmandu Kings XI

Career statistics
Competition	Test	ODI	FC	LA
Matches	22	109	111	230
Runs scored	556	1,113	3,755	3,315
Batting average	18.53	19.52	25.71	24.92
100s/50s	0/3	0/2	7/15	2/12
Top score	72	69*	118	112
Balls bowled	2,940	4,640	11,357	8,942
Wickets	25	135	182	259
Bowling average	65.24	28.06	32.25	27.54
5 wickets in innings	0	2	2	4
10 wickets in match	0	0	0	0
Best bowling	4/52	6/14	7/73	6/14
Catches/stumpings	7/–	26/–	80/–	60/–
Medal record
Men's Cricket
Representing Sri Lanka
ICC Cricket World Cup
Runner-up	2007 West Indies
- Source: ESPNcricinfo, 5 July 2017

Mohamed Farveez Maharoof (Tamil: பர்வீஸ் மஹூஹ்ஃப், Sinhala: ෆර්වීස් මහරූෆ්: born 7 September 1984), or Farveez Maharoof, is a Sri Lankan former professional cricketer, who played Tests and ODIs. He first made his impression in the 2004 Under-19 Cricket World Cup in which he captained the Sri Lankan team. He enjoyed a prolific school career for Wesley College, with a highest score of 243 and best bowling figures of 8 for 20. An all-rounder, he made his Test debut in 2004. He was part of the Sri Lankan team which finished as runners-up at the 2007 Cricket World Cup.

At domestic level, he has represented Bloomfield, Nondescripts, Wayamba, Delhi Daredevils, Lancashire and Barisal Burners. After retiring as a player, Maharoof has acted as an international cricket commentator for Sri Lanka.

== Personal life ==
Maharoof got married on Saturday 18 July 2009 at Colombo, Sri Lanka. Many Sri Lankan and Pakistani cricketers attended the all-rounder's wedding.

== Early cricket ==
Born in Colombo, Farveez Maharoof began playing cricket around the age of eight. He also played football and touch rugby until he was twelve. Maharoof, who attended Wesley College in Colombo, began as a wicketkeeper-batsman and only began bowling regularly from under-13 cricket onwards. Five players were down with flu in one match when Maharoof was called upon to bowl. He took six wickets, including a hat-trick, and from then on concentrated on fast bowling.

In December 2003 and January 2004, at the age of 19, Maharoof toured India with the Sri Lanka A team for a tri-series with India A and Pakistan A. He took nine wickets in the series at an average of 11.77, the best average of the tournament; Maharoof was named Man of the Match in the tournament's final, which Sri Lanka A won. A month later, Maharoof was appointed captain of Sri Lanka Under-19s for the Under-19 World Cup. He had some experience of leading teams, having captained school sides and the national youth sides. In one of the matches, Maharoof scored 56 to help his team to victory over Australia and was named Man of the Match. He made his Twenty20 debut on 17 August 2004, for Bloomfield Cricket and Athletic Club in the 2004 SLC Twenty20 Tournament.

== Domestic career ==
The inaugural edition of the Indian Premier League (IPL), an eight-team domestic twenty20 competition, was held in 2008. Maharoof was bought by the Delhi Daredevils for $225,000. He took 15 wickets in the tournament at an average of 16.60, making him the equal ninth-highest wicket-taker in competition. While playing for in the IPL in 2008, Maharoof was teammates with Australia seam bowler Glenn McGrath; according to Marahroof, McGrath helped him with his bowling variations, making a "huge difference", and introduced more control to his slower ball. For his performances in 2008, he was named in the ESPNcricinfo IPL XI.

On 17 March 2011, it was announced that Maharoof would be joining Lancashire County Cricket Club for the entire English cricket season. He joined Lancashire with the intention of forcing his way back into Sri Lanka's Test team. He made his first-class debut for the club on 20 April, taking the place of injured captain and bowler Glen Chapple. Batting at number eight Maharoof scored a century and took two wickets in the match as Lancashire won by an innings and 20 runs; it was just the seventh time a player had scored a century in their maiden first-class match with Lancashire.

After the second Test, Maharoof returned to play for Lancashire. Towards the end of June he was forced to miss a County Championship due to a stiff back. A few days later he took his 50th T20 wicket when he dismissed Martin Guptill in Lancashire's 10-wicket win against Derbyshire, and in the process helped dismiss Derbyshire for their lowest total in the format. Maharoof was due to leave in mid-June to participate in the inaugural season of the Sri Lanka Premier League, planning to return to Lancashire in August, however the tournament was postponed until 2012. In the last match of the season, Lancashire won the County Championship for the first time since 1950 when they shared the title.

On his return to Sri Lanka, Maharoof finished as the leading run scorer in the 2011–12 Premier Limited Overs Tournament, a domestic competition. His team, the Nondescripts, won the Tier A title for the first time in five years and Maharoof was the competition's leading run-scorer. In the final Maharoof scored 52 runs while opening the batting and dismissed Sachithra Senanayake to claim his 200th wicket in list A matches. His strong performances for the Nondescripts team led to a recall to the ODI squad for the 2011–12 Commonwealth Bank Series with India and Australia. He captained Kathmandu Kings XI in Everest Premier League 2017 held in Nepal.

== International career ==
=== Debut years ===
In April and May 2004, Maharoof was part of the Sri Lanka team that toured Zimbabwe for five ODIs and two Tests. Two players, including Maharoof, made their ODI debut in the third match of the series while three of the Sri Lankan regulars were rested. He took three wickets as Zimbabwe were bowled out for 35, the lowest score in ODI history. In the final two matches of the series, Maharoof took another wickets, finishing the series with five at an average of 16.60. On the same tour, Maharoof made his Test debut. Across the two matches, he scored 40 runs from one innings and took four wickets at an average of just under 40.

Sri Lanka hosted the Indian Oil Cup in July and August 2005; it was a tournament involving the hosts, India, and the West Indies. Ahead of the tournament Chaminda Vaas, one of Sri Lanka's senior seam bowlers, sustained an injury and Maharoof was responsible for opening the bowling with Dilhara Lokuhettige. Maharoof produced one of the most economical bowling displays in ODI history, conceding nine-rune from ten overs against the West Indies for which he was named Man of the Match. He was reprimanded by the International Cricket Council (ICC) for excessive appealing in the match as he began celebrating a dismissal before the batsman had been given out by the umpire.

=== Permanent in the squad ===
When Bangladesh toured for two Tests and three ODIs in August and September that year, Maharoof was against selected in Sri Lanka's squad, allowing senior players to be rested for some of the matches. Although he didn't play in either of the Tests, in the two ODIs Maharoof played he took six wickets at an average of 9.00, finishing equal with Tillakaratne Dilshan as leading wicket-taker in the series. The Sri Lanka coach at the time, Tom Moody, praised Maharoof's bowling, saying "Maharoof bowled superbly well in the Indian Oil series and has shown [against Bangladesh] that he going to be a more valuable bowler going into the future".

When Sri Lanka toured Indian in October to December 2005 for three Tests and seven ODIs, Maharoof was included in the squad. He played in six of the seven ODIs, taking six wickets at an average of 39.33 and scoring 60 runs from five innings. Sri Lanka lost the series and the captain at the time, Kumar Sangakkara, described the experience as "a learning trip" for Maharoof, noting that he had bowled well at times. Maharoof played a single Test on the tour, taking three wickets for 77 runs and scoring just six runs. In the qualifying round of the 2006 Champions Trophy, he picked up the best bowling analysis in the history of the tournament (6–14), which is also the ninth best analysis in all ODIs. That was against the defending champions West Indies, and was Maharoof's first five wicket haul in ODIs.

Maharoof took his maiden first-class five-wicket haul in November 2006 in a match for Bloomfield against Ragam which ended in a draw. His 7 wickets for 73 runs beat his previous best bowling figures in first-class cricket of 4/12.

Maharoof took 4/23 against Bermuda to start the 2007 World Cup and became the first Sri Lankan to take a 4 wicket haul on his World Cup debut. On 7 October 2007 Maharoof took his 100th wicket in his 75th ODI; at the time he was the fastest Sri Lankan to reach the landmark, beating Muttiah Muralitharan by one match, however this record was later taken by fast bowler Lasith Malinga in 2010 who reached 100 wickets in 68 matches.

After the inaugural IPL in 2008, Maharoff joined the Sri Lanka squad in preparation for the 2008 Asia Cup, however an abdominal strain prevented him from taking part.

For his performances in 2008, he was named in the World ODI XI by the ICC.

=== Back to form ===
On 22 June 2010 Maharoof took his first hat-trick in One day International against India in Asia Cup 2010. The cup's final against India was his last match until early 2012. The auction for the 2011 IPL was held in January that year, and although Maharoof was available he was not signed by a team.

Sri Lanka embarked on a tour of England in May. Five players selected in the squad chose to participate in the IPL instead of Sri Lanka's first warm-up match, and consequentially Maharoof was drafted in to provide cover until they arrived. Initially called up for a single tour match, Maharoof was added to the Test squad when seam bowlers Dilhara Fernando and Nuwan Pradeep sustained injuries. Having played in the first two Tests, Maharoof was left out of Sri Lanka's squad for the ODI leg of the tour. Stuart Law, the team's coach, explained that "He hasn't quite set the world on fire but he hasn't done a lot wrong. It just hasn't worked for him at this stage." His last ODI was the final of the Asia Cup in June 2010.

=== Return ===
Maharoof was included to the ODI squad for tour against England and Ireland in 2016, after 4 years in international arena. After 2008, he played his first T20I against England on 5 July 2016, where 72 T20Is were missed by Maharoof for Sri Lanka, before appearing in this match.

== Honors ==
The Castrol Asian Cricket Awards were held for the first time in June 2008, and Maharoof was named best ODI Asian bowler. Although selected to tour Pakistan for three ODIs and two Tests in January to March 2009, Maharoof sustained a groin injury and was ruled out of the Tests.

== Playing style ==
When it comes to batting, Maharoof has described himself as "more of a hard hitter than a technician", and as of February 2012 his batting strike rate (85.24) is the fourth highest amongst Sri Lankans in ODIs. In the opinion of Kumar Sangakkara, he has "the technique and the shots to be an excellent No. 7 batsman [at international level]". Maharoof has a sound batting technique and is able to adapt to many different scenarios. He is mostly known as a player who can score quick runs down the order, but he can also bat a more patient innings, especially if the top batting order collapses.

He bowls at speeds of up to 80 miles per hour (130 km/h) and concentrates on accuracy rather than pace because pitches in Sri Lanka are generally slow. Sangakkara has also noted that Maharoof is able to swing the ball, complementing his accuracy. Under the advice of then Sri Lanka coach Tom Moody, in 2006 Maharoof altered his bowling action slightly so that his front arm was coming down straight in delivery. Of Sri Lankan players who have bowled at least 2,000 balls in Tests, Maharoof's strike rate of one wicket every 117.6 deliveries per wicket is third worst behind Asoka de Silva (291.0) and Arjuna Ranatunga (148.3). Maharoof has been more successful in the opposition's first innings in Tests, taking 20 of his 25 wickets under such circumstances at a strike of 107.7, which increases to 157.2 in the second.
