= Marvan Atapattu =

Sri Lankan cricketer

Deshabandu Marvan Atapattu
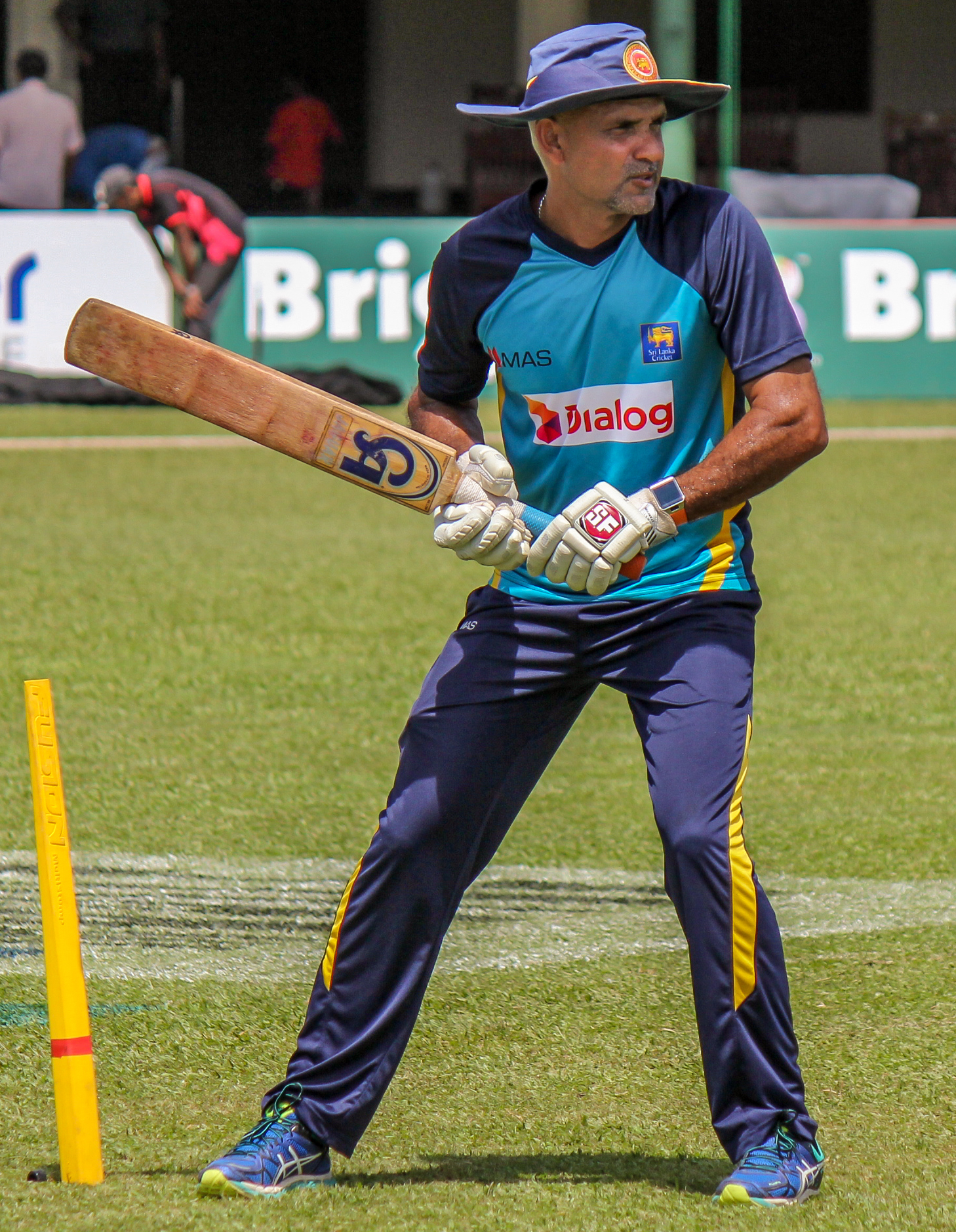
- Atapattu giving slip catching practice

Personal information
- Full name: Marvan Samson Atapattu
- Born: 22 November 1970 (age 55); Kalutara, Ceylon
- Batting: Right-handed
- Bowling: Right-arm leg spin
- Role: Opening batsman

International information
- National side: Sri Lanka (1990–2007)
- Test debut (cap 46): 23 November 1990 v India
- Last Test: 16 November 2007 v Australia
- ODI debut (cap 59): 1 December 1990 v India
- Last ODI: 17 February 2007 v India
- ODI shirt no.: 46

Domestic team information
- Years: Team
- 1990/91–2006/07: Sinhalese Sports Club
- 2007–2008: Delhi Giants

Career statistics
Competition	Test	ODI	FC	LA
Matches	90	268	228	329
Runs scored	5,502	8,529	14,591	10,802
Batting average	39.02	37.57	48.79	39.42
100s/50s	16/17	11/59	47/53	18/71
Top score	249	132*	253*	132*
Balls bowled	48	51	1,302	81
Wickets	1	0	19	1
Bowling average	24.00	–	36.42	64.00
5 wickets in innings	0	–	0	0
10 wickets in match	0	–	0	0
Best bowling	1/9	–	3/19	1/12
Catches/stumpings	58/–	70/–	150/–	91/–
Medal record
Men's Cricket
Representing Sri Lanka
ICC Cricket World Cup
Winner	1996 India-Pakistan-Sri Lanka
Runner-up	2007 West Indies
- Source: CricketArchive, 27 September 2008

Deshabandu Marvan Samson Atapattu (Sinhala: මාවන් සැම්සන් අතපත්තු, [ma:ʋən sæmsən atəpattu], born 22 November 1970) is a Sri Lankan cricket coach, commentator and former professional cricketer. He played international cricket for the Sri Lankan cricket team from 1990 to 2007.

A top-order batsman, Atapattu's batting style was considered reliable and technically sound. His Test career began inauspiciously with five ducks in his first six innings, but he went on to appear in 90 Tests and score six double centuries, with a career Test batting average of 39. In One-Day Internationals, Atapattu played 268 matches and won the 1996 Cricket World Cup; he captained the Sri Lankan team that won the 2004 Asia Cup.

After retiring as a player, Atapattu became the batting coach of the Canada national cricket team, then the head coach of Singapore. He was appointed the batting coach of Sri Lanka in 2011, then promoted to head coach in April 2014, but resigned in September 2015.

== Early life ==
Marvan Atapattu started his cricket career as a teenager at Mahinda College, Galle, where Major G. W. S. de Silva was his first cricket coach. Then he moved to Ananda College, Colombo, where he was subsequently coached by P. W. Perera.

== International career ==
Making his Test debut in November 1990 just after his 20th birthday, Atapattu's first six innings yielded five ducks and a 1, and he was the first Sri Lankan batsman to be dismissed for a pair on debut. After this difficult start in his first three matches, he did not score above 29 in his next 11 innings, before hitting his first Test century in his 10th match, against India, seven years after his debut. He has 22 Test-match career ducks and four pairs (two ducks in a single Test), both records for a top-order batsman.

He made his One-Day International debut against India at Nagpur. He was appointed as captain of the one-day team in April 2003. He registered his highest Test score of 249 against Zimbabwe in 2004, sharing a 438-run partnership with Kumar Sangakkara for the second wicket. Atapattu scored a century in the first innings of the Second Test during his team's tour of Australia in 2004 in Cairns, Queensland. His third century in five innings, he made 133. A "determin[ed]" Atapattu, Cricinfo wrote, "pull[ed] authoritatively ... tuck[ed] in neatly behind the ball." He finished the two-match series scoring 156 runs at an average of 39.00 and was the top-scorer for his team.

Atapattu was a skilful fielder with an accurate throw. A report prepared by ESPNcricinfo in late 2005 showed that since the 1999 Cricket World Cup, he had effected the second highest number of run-outs in ODI cricket of any fieldsman, with the seventh-highest success rate. He was controversially left out of the squad for the 2007 Cricket World Cup, and as a result, asked for his removal from the list of Sri Lanka contracted players. Atapattu was to miss the 2007–08 tour of Australia, but was added to the squad after the intervention of Sri Lankan Sports Minister Gamini Lokuge. Atapattu played solidly in the First Test, but subsequently angrily labelled the selectors: "A set of muppets, basically, headed by a joker," at a post-stumps press conference.

After Sri Lanka lost the series 2–0, Atapattu announced his international retirement after the second Test at Hobart. He finished with 5,502 Test runs at an average of 39.02 in 90 Tests with a One-day International average of 37.57 after hitting 8,529 runs in 268 matches. Atapattu scored six double centuries and sixteen centuries in his Test cricket career. He has scored centuries against all Test-playing nations.

=== International centuries ===
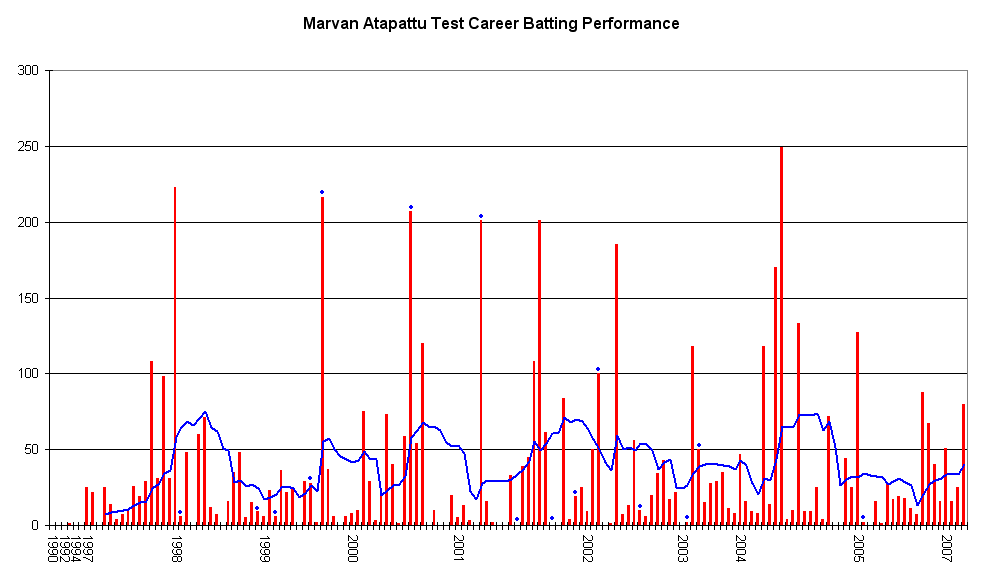
Marvan Atapattu's test batting record

Atapattu scored his first test century in 1997, seven year after his debut, against India, and in that cricket match he made 108 runs as the match was played at the Punjab Cricket Association IS Bindra Stadium in Mohali.

His highest Test score of 249 came against Zimbabwe in 2004 at Bulawayo. His score of 127 in 2005 against New Zealand was his last Test century. As of August 2015, Atapattu is sixth in the list of most double hundreds scored in Test matches.

Atapattu scored his first ODI century in 1997 when he scored 118 in 2-run victory against India at the R. Premadasa Stadium in Colombo. At Lord's in 1998, Atapattu scored 132 not out against England, his highest score in this format of the game. He also scored two centuries in the 2003 Cricket World Cup: against Zimbabwe he scored 103 not out and against South Africa, only the 19th tied ODI in cricket history, he made 124. He was selected as man of the match on both occasions. His innings of 111 against Pakistan in 2004 was his last ODI century.

Test centuries scored by Marvan Atapattu
No.	Score	Opponent	Venue	Date	Ref
1	108	India	Punjab Cricket Association Stadium, Chandigarh, India	19 November 1997	
2	223	Zimbabwe	Asgiriya Stadium, Kandy, Sri Lanka	7 January 1998	
3	216 not out	Zimbabwe	Queens Sports Club, Bulawayo, Zimbabwe	18 November 1999	
4	207 not out	Pakistan	Asgiriya Stadium, Kandy, Sri Lanka	28 June 2000	
5	120	South Africa	Asgiriya Stadium, Kandy, Sri Lanka	30 July 2000	
6	201 not out	England	Galle International Stadium, Galle, Sri Lanka	22 February 2001	
7	108	India	Sinhalese Sports Club Ground, Colombo, Sri Lanka	29 August 2001	
8	201	Bangladesh	Sinhalese Sports Club Ground, Colombo, Sri Lanka	6 September 2001	
9	100 not out	Zimbabwe	Galle International Stadium, Galle, Sri Lanka	12 January 2002	
10	185	England	Lord's, London, England	16 May 2002	
11	118	West Indies	Beausejour Cricket Ground, Gros Islet, Saint Lucia	20 June 2003	
12	118	Australia	Sinhalese Sports Club Ground, Colombo, Sri Lanka	24 March 2004	
13	170	Zimbabwe	Harare Sports Club, Harare, Zimbabwe	6 May 2004	
14	249	Zimbabwe	Queens Sports Club, Bulawayo, Zimbabwe	14 May 2004	
15	113	Australia	Cazalys Stadium, Cairns, Australia	9 July 2004	
16	127	New Zealand	McLean Park, Napier, New Zealand	4 April 2005	

ODI centuries scored by Marvan Atapattu
No.	Score	Opponent	Venue	Date	Ref
1	118	India	R. Premadasa Stadium, Colombo, Sri Lanka	17 August 1997	
2	132 not out	England	Lord's, London, England	20 August 1998	
3	119 not out	Pakistan	National Stadium, Karachi, Pakistan	13 February 2000	
4	100	Pakistan	Bangabandhu National Stadium, Dhaka, Bangladesh	7 July 2000	
5	102 not out	India	Sharjah Cricket Stadium, Sharjah, United Arab Emirates	27 October 2000	
6	101	Netherlands	R. Premadasa Stadium, Colombo, Sri Lanka	16 September 2002	
7	123 not out	South Africa	Willowmoore Park, Benoni, South Africa	1 December 2002	
8	101	Australia	Sydney Cricket Ground, Sydney, Australia	9 January 2003	
9	124	South Africa	Kingsmead, Durban, South Africa	3 March 2003	
10	103 not out	Zimbabwe	Buffalo Park, East London, South Africa	15 March 2003	
11	111	Pakistan	Gaddafi Stadium, Lahore, Pakistan	14 October 2004	

== Coaching career ==
In 2009, Atapattu had a coaching stint with the Fingara Cricket Academy, a coaching facility in Sri Lanka. He had a short stint as Canada's batting coach in early 2009, subsequently helping them qualify for the 2011 World Cup. In 2010, he was named as head coach of the Singaporean cricket team for a one-year period, which was his first full-time assignment of a coach of a national team. His first task was World Cricket League Division 5 in Nepal where the team finished third in the group stage and remained in division 5 for 2012 World League.

In April 2011, after the World Cup, Atapattu was named as the batting coach of Sri Lankan national team and joined interim coach Stuart Law, Champaka Ramanayake and Ruwan Kalpage for the tour of England. Meanwhile, he was considered for the head coach job of the team, which eventually went to Paul Farbrace, in 2013. Atapattu was promoted to the post of an assistant coach. Following Farbrace's early unexpected exit in 2014, he was appointed as interim head coach of the team. During this period, Sri Lanka won its first Test series in England in 16 years, with a 1–0 win in its 2014 tour. He officially took over as head coach in September 2014, and was the team's first local coach in 15 years. A 5–2 ODI series win during England's 2014 tour of Sri Lanka was the only series win for Sri Lanka after he formally took over. After consecutive Test series defeats against India and Pakistan, he resigned in September 2015.

== See also ==
- List of Sri Lanka national cricket captains

Preceded by Hashan Tillakaratne	Sri Lankan Test captain 2004–2006	Succeeded by Mahela Jayawardene
Preceded by Sanath Jayasuriya	Sri Lankan ODI cricket captain 2003–2006	Succeeded by Mahela Jayawardene
