= Steve Waugh =

Australian cricketer (born 1965)

Steve Waugh AO
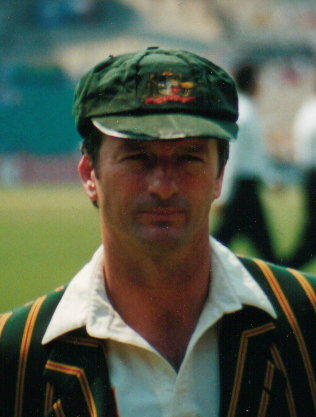
- Waugh in 2002

Personal information
- Full name: Stephen Rodger Waugh
- Born: 2 June 1965 (age 61); Campsie, New South Wales, Australia
- Nickname: Tugga, Ice Man
- Height: 179 cm (5 ft 10 in)
- Batting: Right-handed
- Bowling: Right-arm medium
- Role: Middle-order batter
- Relatives: Mark Waugh (brother); Dean Waugh (brother); Austin Waugh (son)

International information
- National side: Australia (1985–2004)
- Test debut (cap 335): 26 December 1985 v India
- Last Test: 2 January 2004 v India
- ODI debut (cap 90): 9 January 1986 v New Zealand
- Last ODI: 3 February 2002 v South Africa
- ODI shirt no.: 5

Domestic team information
- Years: Team
- 1984/85–2003/04: New South Wales
- 1987–1988: Somerset
- 1998: Ireland
- 2002: Kent

Career statistics
Competition	Test	ODI	FC	LA
Matches	168	325	356	436
Runs scored	10,927	7,569	24,052	11,764
Batting average	51.06	32.90	51.94	37.70
100s/50s	32/50	3/45	79/97	13/67
Top score	200	120*	216*	140*
Balls bowled	7,805	8,883	17,428	11,245
Wickets	92	195	249	257
Bowling average	37.44	34.67	32.75	33.49
5 wickets in innings	3	0	5	0
10 wickets in match	0	0	0	0
Best bowling	5/28	4/33	6/51	4/32
Catches/stumpings	112/–	111/–	273/–	150/–
Medal record
Men's Cricket
Representing Australia
ICC Cricket World Cup
Winner	1987 India and Pakistan
Winner	1999 England-Wales -Ireland-Scotland-Netherlands
Runner-up	1996 India-Pakistan-Sri Lanka
Commonwealth Games
Silver medal – second place	1998 Kuala Lumpur
- Source: Cricinfo, 31 December 2004

Stephen Rodger Waugh (born 2 June 1965) is an Australian former international cricketer and twin brother of cricketer Mark Waugh. A right-handed batsman and a medium-pace bowler, Waugh is considered one of the greatest cricketers of all time. Waugh was a part of the Australian team that won their first world title during the 1987 Cricket World Cup. As Australian captain from 1997 to 2004, he led Australia to fifteen of their record sixteen consecutive Test wins, and to victory in the 1999 Cricket World Cup. Waugh is considered the most successful Test captain in history with 41 victories and a winning ratio of 72%.

Born in New South Wales, where he began his first-class cricket career in 1984, he captained the Australian Test cricket team from 1999 to 2004, and was the most capped Test cricket player in history, with 168 appearances, until Sachin Tendulkar of India broke this record in 2010. Waugh was the world number 1 all-rounder in both Test and One Day International (ODI) cricket until back issues forced him to give up bowling. He concentrated only on batting and went on to become one of the leading batsmen of his time. He is one of only fourteen players to have scored more than 10,000 Test runs.

He was named Australian of the Year in 2004 for his philanthropic work, and inducted into the ICC Cricket Hall of Fame in front of his home fans at the Sydney Cricket Ground in January 2010.

Waugh has been included in a list of one hundred Australian Living Treasures by the National Trust of Australia, awarded the Order of Australia and the Australian Sports Medal. Known as an attacking and sometimes ruthlessly efficient captain, Described in 2003 as a "cold-blooded, scientific" leader, cricket columnist of The Times Simon Barnes noted that "Waugh wants to defeat you personally." At the end of his final Test match, Waugh was carried by his teammates in a lap of honour around the Sydney Cricket Ground. In a fan poll conducted by the CA in 2017, he was named in the country's best Ashes XI in the last 40 years.

== Early and personal life ==
Born at Canterbury Hospital in Campsie, a suburb in South-Western Sydney on 2 June 1965, Waugh was one of twin boys born to Rodger and Beverley Waugh. He arrived four minutes before Mark, who went on to play cricket for Australia alongside him. Their father was a bank official and his mother was a teacher within the New South Wales Department of Education. The family settled in the South-Western Sydney suburb of Panania. The twins were later joined by two more brothers, Dean (who also went on to play first-class cricket in Australia) and Danny (who played first grade cricket for Sydney University Cricket Club). From an early age, the parents introduced their children to sport. By the age of six, the twins were playing organised soccer, tennis and cricket. In their first cricket match, the brothers were both dismissed for ducks.

The twins came from a sporting family. Their paternal grandfather Edward was a greyhound trainer. Raised in the North Coast town of Bangalow, Edward earned selection for the New South Wales Country team in rugby league. He was about to join Eastern Suburbs in the New South Wales Rugby League, but had to give up his career due to family reasons. Rodger was Edward's only son and was promising tennis player, who was ranked eighth in Australia in his junior years and was the state champion at under-14 level. On the maternal side, Bev was a tennis player who won the under-14 singles at the South Australian Championships. Her eldest brother Dion Bourne was an opening batsman who played for Bankstown in Sydney Grade Cricket and remains the leading runscorer in the club's history.

The twins made their first representative cricket team when they were selected for the Bankstown District under-10s at the age of eight. In 1976, the twins were the youngest ever to be selected in the New South Wales Primary Schools' soccer team. Playing for Panania Primary School, the twins swept their school to win the Umbro International Shield, a statewide knockout soccer competition, scoring all of their team's three goals in the final. They were a key part of their school's consecutive state cricket championships, and were part of the school tennis team that came second in the state in their final year. In his final year, Steve was the vice-captain of the cricket team and captained the state soccer team. The twins were instrumental in New South Wales winning the cricket carnival without a defeat, in one match combining in a partnership of 150.

By this time, the increasing time demands led to conflicts between the sports, and were in one case delisted from a team due to a conflict of commitments. The twins progressed to East Hills Boys Technology High School, which had a history of producing Australian international representatives in a number of sports.

Aged 13, the twins were invited by their uncle Bourne, then the captain of Bankstown's first grade team, to trial for the club's under-16 team for the Green Shield, and both were selected. Aged fourteen, both made their senior grade cricket debut in 1979–1980, playing in the Fourth XI. The twins broke into East Hills Boys First XI in the same season, and achieved the same level in soccer. In 1980–81 the brothers were elevated to the Third XI mid-season.

The brothers often formed a two-man team—in one match taking 16/85 between them. At the end of 1980, the twins were selected in the state under-16 team for the national carnival. The pair changed soccer teams to play in the reserve grade for Sydney Croatia in the state league being paid small amounts in the professional league. However, they quickly left as their cricket careers increasingly demanded more time.

The brothers were promoted to Bankstown's Second XI, before being selected for the First XI in the 1982–83 season, aged 17, both making their debut against Western Suburbs. However, Waugh was dropped back to the Second XI, He was regarded as an aggressive player, something that characterised his early international career.

The twins finished high school at the end of 1983. In 1983–84, both were members of New South Wales Combined High Schools and the state under-19 team. Waugh made 170 against Great Public Schools. The brothers were then selected for Australia for the first time. They had been named in the national under-19 team to play a Test and ODI series against the touring Sri Lankan counterparts.

The under-19 series pitted several future international players against one another. Waugh scored 187 in the Third Test at Melbourne as Australia won 1–0. After leaving high school, Waugh enrolled in a teaching course, but withdrew after a few lectures. He made his maiden First XI century during the season with tons against Sydney University and Waverley.

At the start of the 1984–85 season, the brothers were included in the New South Wales state squad.

At the end of the season, the twins signed a contract to spend the Australian winter to play for Egerton Cricket Club in the Bolton League in Lancashire. Each club was allowed to have one professional; Steve was officially designated as such but would split the earnings with Mark. The twins were billeted with a local family.

However, during the year, an Australian rebel tour to South Africa was staged, breaking the boycott against the apartheid regime. Some players defected from the Australian Test team to play in South Africa. This resulted in Dave Gilbert being promoted to the national squad, forcing him to forfeit his Esso scholarship, which allowed him to play Second XI cricket in the County Championship. Steve was selected to replace Gilbert with Essex, leaving Mark as the lone professional.

In December 2017, his son, Austin Waugh, was named in Australia's squad for the 2018 Under-19 Cricket World Cup.

== Domestic career ==
Waugh made his first-class debut for New South Wales (NSW) in 1984–85, batting at number nine and bowling medium pace. In the Sheffield Shield final that season, he scored 71 while batting with the tail to help NSW to victory.

== International career ==
After ten first-class matches for NSW, he made his Test debut against India in the 1985–86 season, in the Second Test at Melbourne. He scored 13 and 5 and took 2/36 in the first innings. Failing to make a substantial score in the series (he tallied 26 runs in four innings), Waugh was retained for the subsequent tour of New Zealand. He had a good all-round match in the Second Test at Christchurch, making 74 and claiming 4/56, but his batting average was only 17.40 for the series, scoring 86 runs. Waugh had more success in the one-day format during the season. He made his debut against New Zealand at the MCG and took 1/13 and a catch. He did not bat as the match was washed out. He was retained for all of Australia's 12 matches in the triangular tournament, scoring 266 runs at 38.00 with two half-centuries, including a top score of 81 in the Australia Day victory over India. He took seven wickets at 33.00. Waugh was retained for all four ODIs on the tour of New Zealand, scoring 111 runs at 27.75 and taking four wickets at 39.75.

The Australian selectors persisted with Waugh, and he toured India in 1986, despite having scored only 113 runs at 12.56 in his Test career. During the three Tests, Waugh had limited opportunities and scored 59 runs for once out and took two wickets. At this stage of his career, Waugh bore a heavy workload as a bowler although he was ostensibly selected for his batting. He played in all six ODIs on tour, scoring 111 runs at 55.50 and taking seven wickets at 35.86.

He bowled a long spell, taking 3/76, in the First Test against England at Brisbane in 1986–87, then scored 0 and 28 as Australia slumped to defeat. In the Second Test at Perth, he made 71 and had match figures of 5/159 including 5/69 in the second innings, then he scored 79 not out in the drawn Third Test at Adelaide. Scores of 49 and 73 in the last two Tests, gave him series figures of 310 runs (at 44.29) and ten wickets (at 33.60), a fighting effort in a team defeated 1–2. The win in the Fifth Test was the first time that Waugh was in a victorious Test team, in his 13th match. Waugh played in all of Australia's 13 ODIs for the home season, scoring 372 runs at 37.20 with two half-centuries and taking 21 wickets at 21.80. Waugh regularly performed with both bat and ball. In a match against Pakistan, he scored 82 and then took 4/48 but could not stop the visitors taking a one-wicket victory from the second last ball. He then scored 83* and took 2/30 in an Australia Day victory against England. He was unable to maintain his form in the finals, scoring one and one and taking a total of 1/78 as England won 2–0. Early in his international career, Waugh was a natural, uninhibited strokeplayer who liked to drive off the back foot. He could score quickly, but was inconsistent at Test level and seemed better suited to ODI cricket. In the shorter game, he often accelerated the scoring in the later overs of the innings. As a bowler, he was known for his astute change of pace and was the pioneer in inventing a carefully disguised slower ball bowled from the back of the hand, and regularly sent down the final overs, when his astute change of pace was difficult to score from. Allan Border often used Waugh as a final overs specialist in crunch situations and at his peak as a bowler, Waugh was the top slog overs specialist bowler for any conditions.

=== 1987 World Cup ===
The 1987 World Cup, played on the Indian subcontinent, was the turning point of Waugh's career. Having scored 19* in the death overs against India in the first match, Waugh's tight bowling in the closing overs finished with his dismissal of Maninder Singh in the final over, which secured a one-run victory. In the following match against Zimbabwe, Waugh scored 45 before conceding only seven runs in six overs of bowling as the Australians won by 96 runs. In the following match against New Zealand, Waugh bowled the last over with the Kiwis requiring seven runs for victory: he restricted them to only three runs by taking two wickets in the over. He ended with 2/36.

In the second round robin rotation, Waugh took 1/59 and scored 42 in a 56-run loss to India, before taking 2/37 in a 17-run win over New Zealand. In Australia's final group match, Waugh scored 10* before taking 1/9 from four overs in a 70-run win over Zimbabwe. Australia qualified for the semi-finals and faced co-hosts Pakistan on their home soil in Lahore. Batting first, Waugh hit 16 from the final over of the innings in a cameo of 32*, a match that Australia won by 18 runs. In the final, he scored an unbeaten five in a brief innings at the end of the innings. He was a key player as Australia defended a target of 254 against England at Kolkata. He claimed the wickets of Allan Lamb and Phillip DeFreitas in the 47th and 49th overs as England stumbled towards the end of the run-chase. Australia won by seven runs to claim the World Cup for the first time. Waugh compiled 167 runs at 55.66 and took 11 wickets at 26.18. These performances in tight situations earned him the nickname of "Iceman".

=== Breakthrough tour of England ===
However, Waugh continued to be inconsistent in Test matches. He made only 194 runs at 32.33 in five Tests in 1987–88 against the touring New Zealand, England and Sri Lanka teams. His bowling helped to keep him in the team, with nine wickets at 29.67. Waugh's ODI form remained strong, playing in all of Australia's 11 ODIs for the season, scoring 226 runs at 32.29 and taking 18 wickets at 23.50. He scored one half-century and took a haul of 4/33 in one match against Sri Lanka.

A Test tour of Pakistan in late 1988 was unproductive, with 92 runs at 18.40 with one half century and two wickets at 108.00. In 1988–89 against the West Indies, Waugh mixed some batting failures with two entertaining innings of 90 and 91 on the faster pitches of Brisbane and Perth, respectively. He bowled a series of bouncers at Viv Richards at Brisbane and claimed 3/77 and 5/92 in the Third Test at Melbourne. Of Waugh's spell at Brisbane, Bill O'Reilly wrote:

The most significant incident of the Brisbane Test ... was the salutation young Steve Waugh served up, in the form of three consecutive bouncers, to visiting captain Viv Richards ... I took it immediately as an uncompromising message to the opposing skipper that Waugh was sick to death of the bouncer policy that the West Indies have for so long adopted as their standard method of attack.

Waugh continued to perform strongly in the ODIs, scoring 270 runs as 38.57 and taking seven wickets at 49.42. His highest score and best bowling analysis occurred in the same match, taking 3/57 before scoring 54 against West Indies in Melbourne. Despite this, Australia still lost the match.

Heading into the 1989 Ashes series, Waugh's batting average was 30.52 from 26 Tests. In the three-match ODI series that preceded the Tests, Waugh scored 113 runs at 37.66 and took three wickets at 54.00.

Waugh finally scored his maiden Test century, 177 not out in the First Test at Leeds. It was a free flowing innings marked by square driving, in just over five hours of batting which helped Australia set the platform for a win with a large first innings. He followed this with an unbeaten 152 in the Second Test at Lord's, adeptly shepherding his tailend partners to help Australia set up a winning 242 run lead in the first innings. He was not dismissed until the first innings of the Third Test for 43, by which time he had amassed 393 runs. Waugh scored 92 in the Fourth Test at Old Trafford in another win. He did not pass 20 in either of the last two Tests and finished the series with 506 runs at 126.5. He bowled less frequently, with only two wickets in the six Tests. It was on this tour that he first experienced back problems that would hinder his bowling. On the brief tour of India for the Nehru Cup ODI tournament that followed the Ashes series, Waugh played as a specialist batsman for the first time. He scored 88 runs at 22.00 and did not bowl a ball.

As Australia returned home for the 1989/90 international season. He scored 378 runs at 37.8 in the six Tests in Australia and the one-off Test in New Zealand. The highlight was an unbeaten 134 against Sri Lanka in the Second Test in Hobart. This followed twin half centuries in the First Test. His focus on batting saw him aggregate only 1/19 with the ball for the seven Tests. Thereafter his Test form tapered off.

The ODIs followed a similar pattern. Australia played ten ODIs on home soil during the season, followed by five in New Zealand. After taking two wickets at 38.50 in the first three ODIs, Waugh did not bowl again for the season. After scoring only 99 runs at 19.80 in the first nine ODIs in Australia, Waugh was dropped for the Second Final against Pakistan, which Australia won. He played in all five ODIs in New Zealand, making only 72 runs at 18.00. He returned to the bowling crease in the Sharjah tournament, taking four wickets at 28.00 and scoring 98 runs at 49.00.

In 1990, Waugh joined his twin brother Mark in an unbeaten partnership of 464 in 407 minutes for NSW against Western Australia (WA) at the WACA Ground, setting a world first-class record. Both teams were at full strength and WA's attack included Test bowlers Terry Alderman, Bruce Reid and Chris Matthews. The twins ended with 216 and 229 respectively.

=== Omission ===
He suffered a form slump during the 1990–91 Ashes series in Australia, and was dropped for the Fourth Test at Adelaide after making only 82 runs at 20.50. He was replaced by his twin Mark, who scored a century on debut.

However, Waugh remained a regular in the ODI team, playing in all ten ODIs, scoring 141 runs at 35.25 and taking seven wickets at 49.42.

Recalled for the Third Test in Trinidad during the 1991 tour of the Caribbean, he and Mark became the first twins to play in a Test match together. However, he failed to post a significant score and was dropped for the Fifth Test, Australia's only win for the series.

He played in all five ODIs and scored 86 runs at 28.66 and took five wickets at 30.60.

Waugh remained out of the Test team for eighteen months and did not see action in the five-day format in 1991–92 season. Nevertheless, Waugh played in all 18 ODIs for the season. In the triangular series, he scored only 146 runs at 18.25 but consistently took wickets, with 16 scalps at 19.00. As a result, he retained his position in the team for all eight of Australia's group matches in the subsequent 1992 Cricket World Cup held in Australia and New Zealand. He scored 187 runs at 26.71 and took eight wickets at 34.63. He scored 55 and took 2/28 in a 128-run win over Zimbabwe as Australia failed to progress beyond the group stage.

He returned as number three batsman for the 1992–93 home Test series against the West Indies, but his form was again moderate. His 228 runs at 25.33 was bolstered by a score of 100 in the Third Test in Sydney. Waugh called this "probably the most important hundred of my Test career ... word had reached me that if I didn't get runs, then I was going to be dropped". He continued to be a fixture in the ODI team, playing in all ten matches and scoring 213 runs at 23.66 with one half-century and taking nine wickets at 39.22.

Solid performances on the tour of New Zealand, where he scored 178 Test runs at 44.50, enabled Waugh to hold his position on the 1993 Ashes tour of England. He completed his tour with 120 runs at 30.00 and three wickets at 57.66 in the five ODIs. The three-match ODI series in England preceded the Tests and Waugh scored 41 runs at 20.50 and took five wickets at 30.20.

During the Test series, Michael Slater became the regular opener and Boon returned to the middle order. Waugh gained the number six position ahead of two promising Western Australians, Justin Langer and Damien Martyn. In the Fourth Test at Headingley, Waugh's 157 not out earned comparisons to his efforts in 1989 and he shared an unbroken stand of 332 with Allan Border. He also scored half-centuries in the First and Fifth Tests and ended with 416 at 83.2 from limited opportunities – he played nine innings, only five of which were completed. Australia's top order batting dominated the English attack, and the tourists retained the Ashes 4–1.

=== New approach ===
Returning to Australia, he solidified his position by scoring an unbeaten 147 against New Zealand in an innings victory in the Third Test at Brisbane, ending the series with 216 runs once dismissed. He missed part of the 1993–94 triangular ODI tournament with New Zealand and South Africa due to a hamstring injury in late December, as well as the first two Tests against the South Africans. He returned for the end of the ODIs and ended with 141 runs at 23.50 and taking four wickets at 54.50. Waugh played in the Third Test at Adelaide Oval in late January with Australia trailing 1–0. He scored a 160 and took 4/26 as Australia won the Test and levelled the series. He was named as the international player of the [Australian] season.

He took 5/28 and scored 86 in the Second Test of the return series in South Africa at Newlands, Cape Town to help Australia level the series 1–1 after losing the first at Wanderers in Johannesburg. Another half century saw him end with 195 runs at 65.00 and his bowling was at its most productive in five years, with 10 wickets at 13.00. In the ODI series, he received the player of the series for his all-round efforts, which hauled Australia back from a deficit of 2–4 to draw the series at 4–4. Waugh took 2/48 in the final match as Australia levelled the series by one run. He ended with 291 runs at 48.50 and five wickets at 56.40.

At the conclusion of the tour, the Australian Cricket Board interviewed Waugh, along with David Boon, Mark Taylor and Ian Healy to discern their opinions on the direction of the team after the impending retirement of Allan Border as captain. In spite of Waugh's greater experience, Taylor was granted the captaincy, while Healy was made vice-captain.

The new leadership took the team to Sri Lanka for the Singer World Series ODI tournament and then on a Test-playing tour of Pakistan. Waugh scored 53 runs at 17.66 and took five wickets in 16.20. On the latter tour, Waugh made 73 in the First Test, which Australia agonisingly lost by one wicket. His 98 in the Second Test at Rawalpindi was notable for his survival against a hostile barrage of short-pitched bowling from Wasim Akram and Waqar Younis. He eventually fell when a bouncer struck his body and rolled onto the stumps. A shoulder injury forced him out of the final Test, which Australia drew and therefore lost the series. Waugh scored 153 runs at 38.25 with two half-centuries and took two wickets at 72.00 as Australia won the ODI tournament.

During the 1994–95 Ashes series against England, he narrowly missed centuries in the Second and Fifth Test in Melbourne and Perth respectively, when he was 94 and 99 not out respectively when the last wicket fell. In the second instance, his brother Mark was run out after a mix-up while running for the injured Craig McDermott. It was an uneven series performance, scoring 94* and 26* in the Second Test and 99* and 80 in the Fifth, but not passing 20 in the six innings of the other three Tests. He ended the series with 345 at 49.28 and did not bowl for the entire series. Waugh played only one ODI for the season, scoring a duck and not bowling a ball. The season ended with short ODI tournament in New Zealand, which Australia won. Waugh scored 81 runs at 27.00 in four matches and did not bowl.

=== Frank Worrell Trophy regained in 1995 ===
The West Indies had been the bête noire of Australian cricket since winning the Frank Worrell Trophy in 1978. At the beginning of Australia's 1995 tour of the Caribbean, the West Indies had not lost a Test series since 1980, and had not lost a Test series to Australia at home since 1973. The Tests were preceded by an ODI series that was lost 1–4. Waugh scored 164 runs at 32.80 and took three wickets at 41.00. In a low-scoring, four-Test series, Waugh compiled 429 runs at an average of 107.25 and claimed five wickets (for 62 runs) to win the player of the series award; his twin Mark was the next best batsman with 240 runs at 40 average.

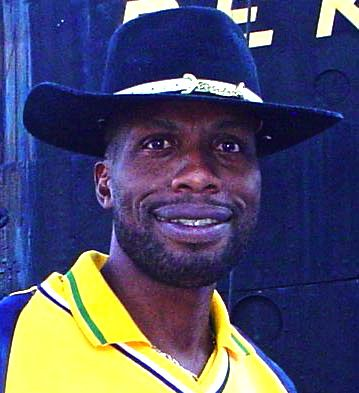
Curtly Ambrose, the West Indian bowler with whom Waugh had a much-publicised altercation during the 1995 Frank Worrell Trophy

Waugh was at the centre of a controversy during the First Test at Barbados when he claimed a low catch from Brian Lara in the first innings. Television replays were inconclusive, but suggested that the ball may have hit the ground. Lara, noted for accepting the word of the fielder without question, left the field. Following his dismissal, the West Indies' batting collapsed, and Australia went on to win by ten wickets. Waugh later faced accusations of dishonesty and cheating over the incident.

After scoring 65 not out in the drawn Second Test at Antigua, Waugh defied the Caribbean pacemen on a green pitch at Trinidad suited to their hostile bowling during the Third Test. In the first innings, he scored an unbeaten 63 of Australia's 128 and had a mid-pitch confrontation with Curtly Ambrose. After Waugh had evaded a bouncer from Ambrose, the pair exchanged glares. Waugh swore and told Ambrose to return to his bowling mark. An angry Ambrose had to be physically dragged away by his captain: a photograph of this moment has become one of the iconic images of cricket in the 1990s. It symbolised the point when Australia was no longer intimidated by the West Indies. Waugh "showed he was prepared to put it all on the line", said Justin Langer, "in the toughest conditions [...] against probably the best fast bowler of our time. To stand up to him [Ambrose] and go toe to toe [...] gave us a huge boost."

Nevertheless, the West Indies won the match and levelled the series. In the decider in Jamaica, Waugh took 2/14 in the West Indies' first innings of 265 and then arrived at the crease with Australia at 73 for three in reply. He compiled a long partnership of 231 runs with his brother Mark, who was eventually out for 126. Waugh was the last man to go, out for 200 after nine hours of batting. "Steve had made up his mind to bat and bat", wrote Paul Reiffel, "to stay out there and anchor the proceedings. [... H]e copped a lot of blows on his arms, chest and ribs. When he came back to the dressing room at the end of day two, we could see the spots and bruises on his body [...]. I remember when I walked in [...] he didn't say anything to me, but then he didn't need to. We all pretty much knew that we just had to support him."

"He was in a trance-like state. [... I]n the wee hours of the second morning, a security guard was found rifling through Steve's kit bag. That incident [...] didn't affect his concentration. It all [...] just went to show how strong a character he was."

Waugh played patiently and reached his double century with an all-run four to fine-leg off a quicker ball from Carl Hooper. He was the last man out. With a large lead on first innings, Australia dismissed the opposition for a low score to win a crushing victory.

After some post-win wassailing, Waugh retired to bed in his cricket whites, socks and baggy green. "[Y]ou could say that Steve's legacy gained a lot of momentum from his efforts at Jamaica", wrote Reiffel.

=== No 1 batsman ===
Waugh started the 1995–96 Australian season ranked as the world's leading Test batsman. He made an unbeaten 112 as Australia defeated Pakistan in the First Test at Brisbane and scored 200 runs at 50.00 for the series. Suffering an injury in December, he missed the First Test against Sri Lanka and part of the triangular ODI tournament, then returned for the Boxing Day Test at Melbourne to score 131 not out. Waugh returned during the latter stages of the triangular tournament, playing in the last four matches after missing the first six. He scored his maiden ODI century, ten years after his ODI debut, with an unbeaten 102 against Sri Lanka in Melbourne. Despite this, Australia lost by three wickets. Waugh ended with 128 runs at 42.66 and did not take a wicket, bowling only four overs on his comeback from injury. He helped Australia to a 3–0 result in the Test series by scoring 170 and 61 not out at Adelaide to end the series with 362 runs for once out. He also took 4/34 in the Third Test.

During the 1996 Cricket World Cup on the subcontinent, Waugh scored 82 and featured in a 207-run partnership with his brother during Australia's first match against Kenya: an Australian record partnership at the World Cup. He made an unbeaten half-century in the quarter-final against New Zealand at Madras, sealing a successful run chase. However, he was less effective in the semi-final and final, failing to pass 20 on either occasion. Australia lost the final to Sri Lanka at Lahore.

After the World Cup, Geoff Marsh replaced Bob Simpson as coach. The Australians started the new era with two ODI tournaments in Sri Lanka and India. Waugh scored 366 runs at 40.66 with three half-centuries and took five wickets at 37.40 across nine matches. The tour ended with a solitary Test against India in Delhi, where Waugh was the only Australian to make a half-century in a defeat.

Waugh failed to make a century in the five Tests of the 1996–97 Australian season against the West Indies, scoring 255 runs at 36.42 with three half centuries. He also missed the Second Test against the West Indies after injuring his groin while bowling in the First.

The injury meant that Waugh was only available for six of Australia's eight ODI matches in the annual triangular tournament. Waugh managed only 159 runs at 26.50 and only bowled three overs without taking a wicket as he came back from injury as Australia missed the finals.

Waugh returned to form on the 1997 tour of South Africa, averaging 78.25. He scored 160 in the First Test at Johannesburg, compiling a 385-run partnership with Greg Blewett. They batted for the entire third day's play to set up an innings victory. Waugh then top scored with half-centuries in both innings of the Third Test, which Australia lost. After the team's vice-captain Ian Healy was suspended for throwing his bat after his dismissal, Waugh replaced him as Mark Taylor's deputy. Waugh continued his strong run in the seven ODIs, scoring 301 runs at 50.16 with four half-centuries. After scoring 50 and 50* in the first two matches, he scored 89 in a run chase in the sixth match as Australia sealed the series 4–2 with one over in hand. He then scored 91 in the last match in a vain run chase.

On the 1997 Ashes tour, Australia started poorly with a 0–3 loss in the ODI series, with Waugh managing only 60 runs at 20.00.

This continued as Australia lost the First Test by nine wickets, drew the Second Test, then won the toss in the Third Test at Manchester. Gambling on batting first on green pitch, Australia slumped to 3/42 in the first hour when Waugh came out to bat. He made 108. Similarly, he began his second innings with Australia on 3/39 and scored 116. These two centuries in a low-scoring match won the game. Australia levelled the series and regained the initiative, retaining the Ashes with a 3–2 result. Waugh's only other notable score was 75, scored in the Fifth Test win at Nottingham, and he finished with 390 runs at 39 average for the series.

== Captaincy ==
Steve Waugh's record as captain
	Matches	Won	Lost	Drawn	Tied	No result	Win %
Test	57	41	9	7	0	–	71.93%
ODI	106	67	35	0	3	1	65.23%
Date last Updated:		2 September 2015					

=== ODI captain ===
Waugh took over the captaincy of the one-day team in 1997–98, after captain Mark Taylor and vice-captain Ian Healy, the two oldest players in the team were dropped following Australia's failure to qualify for the Australian tri-nations tournament in the 1996–97 season. Planning began for a more modern team for the 1999 Cricket World Cup, with the batting prowess of new wicket-keeper Adam Gilchrist to prove critical. The new team made a difficult start, losing all four of its preliminary matches against South Africa as Michael di Venuto, Tom Moody and Stuart Law were all tried as Mark Waugh's new opening partner. Waugh himself struggled, scoring only 12 runs, including three ducks in his first six innings before scoring 45* in the last round-robin match to ensure Australia qualified for the finals ahead of New Zealand.

However, with Gilchrist's elevation to opener in the finals series, Australia defeated the South Africans 2–1. Waugh scored 53 and 71 in his two innings, and ended the series with 181 runs at 22.63. He bowled only four overs and took a solitary wicket in the series, which was his first ODI wicket in over a year.

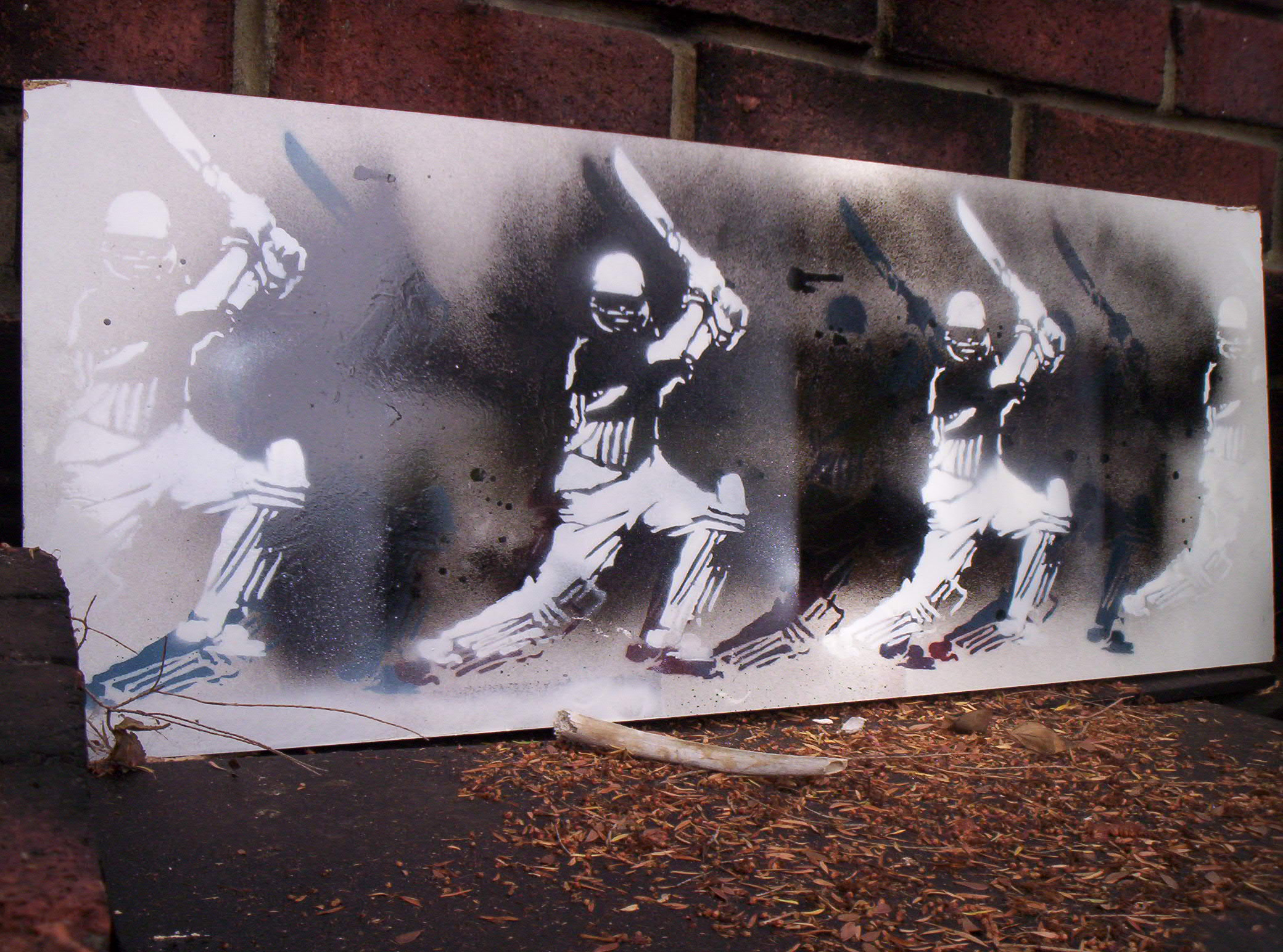
Stencil drawing depicting Steve Waugh

Waugh scored steadily in the 1997–98 Test season against New Zealand and South Africa, getting to 80 three times in six Tests without going on to a century and averaging 40.89; Australia won both series. He bowled more often than in the preceding few years and took six wickets at 17.33.

The southern hemisphere season ended with Waugh leading his first overseas tour, a four-match ODI tour of New Zealand. He scored 112 runs at 37.33 and took three wickets at 42.00 as the series was drawn 2–2.

On the 1998 tour of India, he hit 80 in the Second Test at Calcutta, but missed the following Test due to injury. He ended with 152 runs at 38.

He recovered to lead in the triangular tournament in India. Australia won both games to Zimbabwe but lost both to India. However, Waugh's men turned the tables in the final to beat the Indians by four wickets. Waugh contributed with bat and ball, taking 2/42 and scoring 57. This was followed by a triangular tournament in Sharjah, where Australia won all four group matches against India and New Zealand. This time, the Indians turned the table to win the final by six wickets despite Waugh's 70. Waugh totalled 254 runs at 28.22 and eight wickets at 33.50 for the two tournaments.

Later in the year, he top scored with 157 in the First Test against Pakistan at Karachi, enabling Australia to force an innings victory and gain their first victory in the country for 39 years. It formed the basis of Australia's 1–0 series win, in which Waugh scored 235 runs at 58.75.

Waugh led the ODI team in a 3–0 sweep of Pakistan after the Tests, but he managed only 40 runs at 13.33.

The following season, Waugh suffered hamstring injuries and missed the majority of the ODI tournament. In the two matches in which he played, Waugh made only a duck and 20 and Australia lost both matches. Shane Warne led Australia to victory in his absence, winning eight of the remaining 10 matches.

Waugh began the Ashes series with centuries in the First Test at Brisbane (112) and the Third Test at Melbourne but was criticised for taking singles off the first ball of the over, and exposing the tail-end batsmen to the strike. Stuart MacGill and Glenn McGrath fell to Darren Gough after one such instance as Australia collapsed in the second innings whilst chasing a small target. This criticism could be considered more than a little unfair, however, given his strong record overall of batting well with lower order batsman such as Merv Hughes, Jason Gillespie, Ian Healy, Shane Warne and even Glenn McGrath precisely by putting his faith in them. In the Fifth Test of the season, Waugh was involved in a century partnership with brother Mark for the second consecutive year. Again however, he fell within sight of triple figures for 96, while his brother reached his century. Australia won the Test and the series 3–1.

=== First series as captain ===
Mark Taylor retired at the end of the 1998–99 season and Waugh replaced him as Test captain, beginning with a tour of the Caribbean. Australia was expected to win as the West Indies had just been whitewashed 5–0 by South Africa. After easily winning the First Test, Australia was stymied by West Indies skipper Brian Lara, who batted with Jimmy Adams for the entire second day of the Second Test. This led to a victory for the home team, and in the Third Test, Lara batted for the entire final day to secure an unlikely win by one wicket. This result placed Waugh under immense pressure and he made a controversial decision to drop Shane Warne from the team for the final Fourth Test. Australia won the final Test despite a third consecutive century from Lara, and retained the Frank Worrell Trophy 2–2.

The subsequent ODI series between the two teams was drawn 3–3. The series was notable for two incidents. In the fifth match at Georgetown, Guyana, Waugh was facing the bowling of Keith Arthurton with his team needing four runs from the final over to win. He struck the last ball of the match into the outfield, and attempted three runs to tie the match. A crowd invasion resulted in all the stumps being removed, with Waugh out of his ground when the ball was returned by the fielder. The match was declared a tie. During the West Indies run-chase in the final match in Barbados, local batsman Sherwin Campbell was run out after he fell over because of a collision with the bowler (Brendon Julian) who was attempting to field the ball. This resulted in a crowd riot and Waugh was nearly struck in the head with a glass bottle. The match continued after Campbell was reinstated, but Waugh criticised the security and questioned the integrity of the match.

Waugh struggled in the lead-up to the World Cup, scoring 135 runs at 22.50 and taking two wickets at 33.00.

=== 1999 World Cup victory ===
Australia then had a slow start to the 1999 World Cup in England. After a scratchy win against Scotland, Australia suffered defeats to New Zealand and Pakistan, so they had to win their two remaining group matches (against Bangladesh and the West Indies), then all three "Super Six" matches to progress to the semi-finals: this meant seven consecutive matches without defeat to win the World Cup. After defeating Bangladesh, Waugh and Michael Bevan were criticised for deliberately batting slowly in order to minimise damage to the net run rate of the West Indies. This would enhance Australia's chances: if the West Indies' run rate remained high, they would qualify ahead of New Zealand. Since the Australians had lost to New Zealand, it would be the Kiwis that carried two points through to the next phase if the West Indies was eliminated. If the West Indies proceeded, then Australia would carry over two points from the win.

When questioned about the ethics of this manipulation at a press conference, Waugh retorted, "We're not here to win friends mate". Having beaten India and Zimbabwe in their first two Super Six matches, Waugh saved his best for two must-win games against South Africa: he scored an unbeaten 120 against South Africa in the "Super Six" phase and 56 in the semi-final. The latter match was tied and Australia progressed to the final, where they crushed Pakistan by eight wickets to win the trophy.

The World Cup victory did not immediately turn around Waugh's fortunes in the Test arena. The following tour to Sri Lanka continued the difficulties, when Australia lost the First Test in Kandy, a result exacerbated by a horrific fielding collision between Waugh and Jason Gillespie. Waugh's nose made contact with Gillespie's shin as both attempted a catch. Gillespie suffered a broken leg that sidelined him for 15 months, and Waugh had his nose broken. Although Waugh returned for the following match, the last two Tests were drawn due to interruptions from monsoonal weather. Waugh had a lean series with 52 runs at 17.33. Waugh's team then travelled an inaugural Test against Zimbabwe at Harare. Australia won by ten wickets and Waugh's 151 not out was the first century in Tests between the nations. After the team's return home, John Buchanan replaced Geoff Marsh as team coach.

=== World record of 16 consecutive Test victories ===
The 1999–2000 Test season, his first as captain in a home series, saw further change as Gilchrist ousted Healy from the wicket-keeper's position. With Gilchrist averaging over 50, the team went on to claim a clean-sweep of both Test series, 3–0 against Pakistan and India respectively. Waugh had a lean stretch during the Pakistan series, scoring 58 runs at 14.50, but his team won by margins of ten wickets, four wickets and an innings respectively. Waugh returned to form in the First Test against India at the Adelaide Oval, scoring 150 in the first innings. Waugh only passed fifty once more in the series to end with 276 runs at 55.20. Australia won all three Tests by comfortable margins of 285 runs, 180 runs and an innings respectively.

After losing their first match, his team proceeded to win the season's triangular ODI tournament without further defeat. They then toured New Zealand and won the ODI series 5–1, losing their final match, which ended a world record of 14 consecutive ODI victories. They then swept the Tests against New Zealand 3–0 in early 2000, taking the Tests by 62 runs, six wickets and six wickets respectively. Waugh led the way in the Second Test at the Basin Reserve in Wellington with an unbeaten 151 but otherwise did not pass 20, totalling 214 runs at 53.50. His men had won all nine of their Tests during the southern hemisphere summer.

His team continued their winning streak with an undefeated home season in 2000–01 when the West Indies were white-washed 5–0. The first two Tests were won by an innings, and the Second Test at the WACA brought a twelfth consecutive Test victory, surpassing the record held by the 1980s West Indies team led by Clive Lloyd. Waugh missed the Third Test with injury and Gilchrist led the team in his absence and kept the winning streak alive. Waugh returned for the last two Tests and scored centuries in the first innings of both Tests with 121* and 103 respectively, which Australia won by 352 runs and six wickets respectively. Waugh compiled 349 runs at 69.80.

Waugh then led the Australians undefeated in the triangular ODI tournament against the West Indies and Zimbabwe, despite employing a rotation system which saw the team often understrength with players rested.

=== Failure in India ===
The only significant result that Australia had failed to achieve during Waugh's international career was victory in a Test series in India. Waugh began calling this the "Final Frontier" as Australia had not won there since 1969–70. Australia easily won the First Test at Mumbai by ten wickets to extend the winning sequence to 16. India, looked set for defeat in the Second Test at Eden Gardens in Kolkata after conceding a first innings lead of 274. Waugh top-scored in the first innings with 110. Waugh chose to enforce the follow-on, the only time that Australia had chosen to do so for more than five years. However, VVS Laxman (281) and Rahul Dravid (180) batted for the entire fourth day's play and set Australia a target of 384 on a dusty, spinning wicket. The Australians were unable to cope with the spin of Harbhajan Singh on the final day, and became only the third team to lose a Test after enforcing the follow-on. Starting the final Test well, Australia's batting collapsed on the second morning, losing 6/26 after Waugh became the sixth batsman to be given out handled the ball—he pushed a ball from Harbhajan away from the stumps after being hit on the pads. Waugh's pair of 47s was not enough as Harbhajan finished with 15 wickets in the match to lead India to a two-wicket win in another thrilling finish.

Waugh's team regrouped and won a 4–1 series victory over England during the 2001 Ashes tour. He scored 105 in the First Test at Edgbaston as the Australians started the series with an innings victory. Waugh did not pass 50 in the next two Tests, but Australia won both by eight and seven wickets respectively to retain the Ashes. However, Waugh pulled a calf muscle and missed the Fourth Test at Headingley which Australia lost. In his final Test innings on English soil at The Oval, he combined with brother Mark (120) in a partnership of 197, and scored 157 not out. Australia won by an innings to seal the series 4–1, with Waugh scoring 321 runs at 107.00.

He was unable to maintain this form during the 2001–02 Australian season, failing to score a century in the six Tests against New Zealand and South Africa; The first two Tests against New Zealand were drawn due to rain, and the Third also ended in a draw. Waugh failed to pass double figures until scoring 67 in the second innings of the final Test, finishing the series with 78 runs at 19.50.

Australia then went on to face South Africa, who were the second-ranked Test team in the world and were seen as the leading challengers to Australian supremacy.

Waugh managed only eight and 13 in the First Test, but Australia managed to win by 246 runs in any case. His best score of the series was 90 in the Second Test at the MCG. His innings was ended by a run out decision, which the umpire did not refer to the video umpire. Waugh attracted criticism for not leaving the ground until he had watched a replay of the incident on the stadium's video screen. Australia powered to a nine-wicket win and then polished off a 3–0 sweep with a ten-wicket triumph in the Third Test at the SCG, with Waugh scoring 30.

=== ODI captaincy changed ===
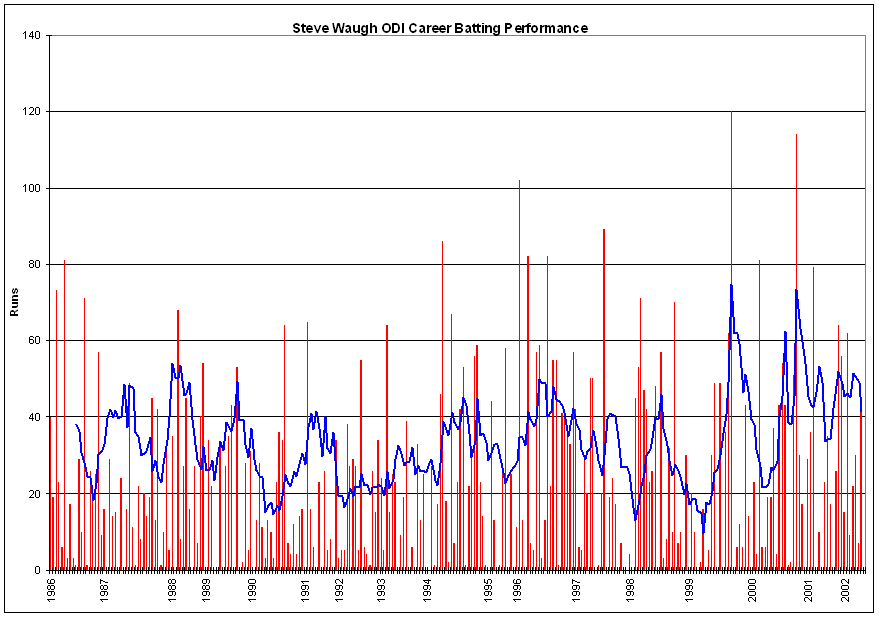
Waugh's ODI career batting performance.The red bars indicate his innings, and the blue line the average of his 10 most recent innings. The blue dots indicate innings in which Waugh finished not out

Australia made an uncertain start to the 2001–02 VB Series, losing the first three of its preliminary matches. A rotation policy designed to ease the workload on older players while giving younger players experience appeared to unsettle the team, and was scrapped. Following this decision, Australia won four of the last five matches, but failed to qualify for the finals for only the third time in 23 years. In their final match, Australia needed a win and a bonus point against South Africa as New Zealand captain Stephen Fleming, in retaliation to Waugh's tactics in the World Cup, had conceded a bonus point to South Africa in the previous match. The team's performance caused a reaction similar that of 1997. With an eye toward the next World Cup, the selectors dropped the Waugh brothers and handed the captaincy to Ricky Ponting. Waugh made his displeasure at the decision public and stated a desire to regain his place in the team.

Continuing as Test captain, Waugh led the team to a 2–1 victory in South Africa to retain Australia's ranking as the number one team. Australia crushed the hosts in the First Test by an innings and 360 runs, won the Second Test by four wickets, before losing the last. His own form was poor, with 95 runs at 19.00. He left the tour once the ODI series began. Arriving in Australia alone, he faced media questioning over his playing future. Waugh's reply was, "We've just beaten the next best team in the world 5–1, and all you want to talk about is getting me out of the team."

The speculation continued about the future of both Waugh brothers in the lead up to the Test series against Pakistan played in mid-2002. The matches were hosted in the United Arab Emirates and Sri Lanka, due to security concerns following a bomb blast inside Pakistan. Australia had a crushing 3–0 win, winning the two latter matches by an innings, but the Waughs had little influence on the result. However, Steve hit 103 not out in his last innings of the series, after scoring consecutive ducks. This may have saved his career; his brother was dropped for the 2002–03 Ashes series and promptly announced his retirement from international cricket.

Despite his team being well on top, Waugh struggled in the early part of the Ashes series and he scored only 106 runs in four innings in the first three Tests. It mattered little to the match results; Australia crushed England in the First Test by 384 runs and proceeded to record consecutive innings victories. In the Fourth Test at the MCG, he scored 77 in the first innings and took his first Test wicket in four years; he did not bowl himself often as captain. However, his score of 14 in the second innings was characterised by many inside edges and false strokes led to increased speculation that he would be dropped. Australia managed to reach their target with five wickets down, despite a stumble on the final morning.

The Fifth Test in his hometown Sydney started with speculation that it would be Waugh's last Test unless he reversed his ongoing form slump. Asked before the final Test to nominate the defining moment of a career likely to soon be over, Waugh made a prediction rather than reflecting, stating: "It might be yet to come". On the second day of the match he then fulfilled this prophecy, scoring a chanceless century – bringing up three figures with a cover driven boundary from the last ball of the day (bowled by off-spinner Richard Dawson). Waugh left the ground to a standing ovation, having equalled Sir Donald Bradman's then Australian record of 29 Test centuries, as well as saving his own Test career. In the second innings, Australia faced a large target and slumped to a heavy defeat by 225 on a deteriorating pitch, its only loss of the series. When he was dismissed cheaply in the second innings, Waugh ran off the field, as the crowd gave him a standing ovation amidst speculation he may choose to retire after what was regarded as a fairytale century.

The 2003 World Cup came and Waugh's desire to return for a fifth World Cup was denied. A chance for a last minute reprieve came when all rounder Shane Watson was injured before the tournament. Waugh had been using his newspaper column to promote his bowling abilities and had been increasingly using himself as a bowler in an attempt to strengthen his case for a recall. However, his successor Ricky Ponting publicly called for the inclusion of then out of form Andrew Symonds. Ponting got his wish, and although the selection was regarded as being highly controversial at the time, Symonds established himself at international level with a series of match winnings innings.

During the April 2003 tour to the West Indies, Waugh made 25 in the First Test and did not bat in the Second, before scoring 115 in the Third Test victory. Australia won all three Tests by nine wickets, 118 runs and nine wickets respectively. He scored 41 and 45* in the Fourth Test to end the series with 226 runs at 75.33. It was in this match, that Australia lost as the home team broke the record for the highest successful Test run chase. Waugh received some criticism over claims he refused to control his players. This came after a heated confrontation between Glenn McGrath and West Indian batsman Ramnaresh Sarwan as the hosts headed towards their target.

The Australian winter of 2003 saw Waugh score consecutive unbeaten centuries of 100 and 156 as Australia took a 2–0 sweep over Bangladesh with innings victories. The Australian summer started in late-2003 and after scoring 78 and 61 in the two Tests against Zimbabwe, which Australia won by an innings and nine wickets respectively, Waugh announced that the 2003–04 series against India would be his last.

=== Farewell season ===
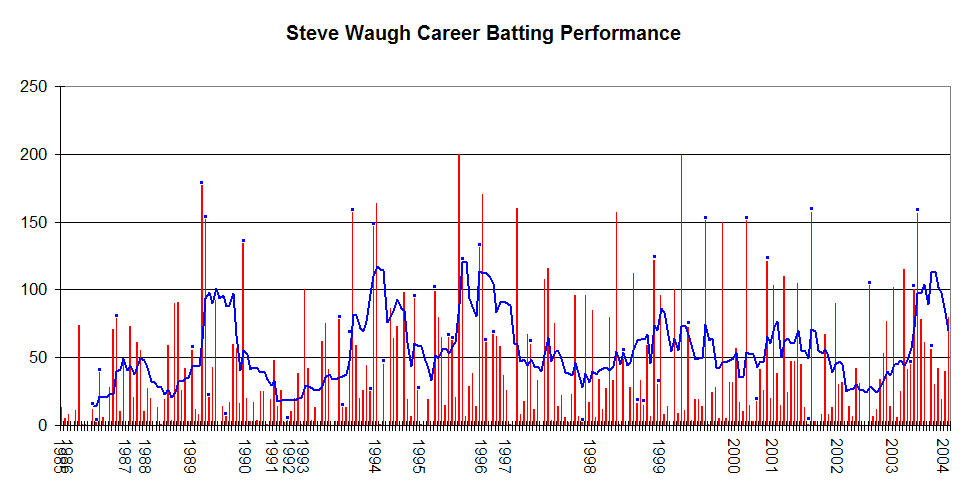
Steve Waugh's Test career performance graph

In the First Test, Waugh was involved in a controversial run out when he had a mix up with Damien Martyn and both players ended up at the same end. Martyn, who had established himself at the crease, sacrificed himself by walking out of his ground for Waugh, who had yet to score. This generated criticism that Waugh's farewell series was being put ahead of team victory. With long bowling spearheads Shane Warne and McGrath unavailable due to drugs suspension and injury respectively, Australia struggled to bowl out the Indian batsmen. After a rain affected draw in the First Test, the next two Tests were shared and Australia needed a win to reclaim the Border–Gavaskar Trophy in the final Fourth Test at Waugh's home ground at the Sydney Cricket Ground. Promoters paid tribute to Waugh by handing out giant red handkerchiefs to incoming spectators; Waugh had always used a red handkerchief to wipe perspiration while he was batting. Any hope of a win for Waugh's Australians disappeared when India batted into the third morning and amass 7/705 (with Sachin Tendulkar smashing 241*), obliging Australia to chase 449 with just over one day's play. Waugh's highest Test score of the season was his last: 80 in the Fourth Test at Sydney, which secured a draw for Australia. After an obdurate start to his innings, he took a more aggressive style once Australia had moved into a position of safety, striking several fours. It was the highest fourth innings score of his Test career. When he passed 50, several ferries on Sydney Harbour sounded their horns in acknowledgement. A record fifth-day SCG crowd turned out to watch Waugh's final day as an Australian player.

== Legacy ==
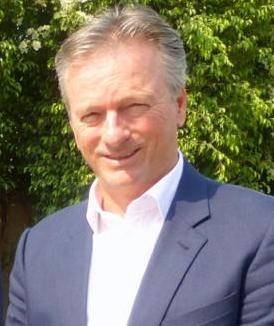
Waugh in 2014

Steve Waugh's approach led to a succession of victories and a record run of 16 consecutive Test match wins, beating the previous record of 11 by the West Indies. His 168 Test matches was the record for Test matches played until 2010; of these he captained Australia on 57 occasions, the fourth highest of all time, and Australia's 41 victories under his leadership, was the most of any Test captain, until Ricky Ponting surpassed him in December 2009. He holds the record of having scored over 150 runs in one innings against each Test playing nation at the time.

- He holds the record for scoring the most career centuries in test history when batting at number 5 position (24)

== Career best performances ==
	Batting			
Format	Score	Fixture	Venue	Season
Test	200	Australia v West Indies	Sabina Park, Kingston	1995
ODI	120 not out	Australia v South Africa	Headingley, Leeds	1999
First-class	216 not out	New South Wales v Western Australia	WACA, Perth	1990
List A	140 not out	Somerset v Middlesex	Lord's, London	1988

== Playing style ==
A shot that Waugh gradually developed (during the 1998 Commonwealth Games specifically) against spin bowling, the "slog sweep" is theoretically technically unsound, but has proven highly effective against the spinners and even against faster bowlers at times. What was also noticeable about Waugh (particularly in the Test arena) on his return to the team was his reluctance (and eventual refusal) to play, what he viewed as, the 'risky' hook shot, rather simply to either play defensively on the back foot, sway or duck out of the way. With this shot removed from Waugh's repertoire his batting developed a safer more reliable look and his Test match batting average steadily rose to around 50 for the remainder of his Test career.

Waugh's ability to continue to play despite a back injury that largely prevented him bowling further enhanced his reputation. He contributed to many one day victories but, often batting in the middle order, his first one-day hundred did not come until his 187th match, for Australia against Sri Lanka at Melbourne in 1995–96.

Early in his career as an all-rounder, Waugh bowled a full-length leg cutter directed at off stump. Against middle-order batsmen, it was intended to induce shots over midwicket or down the ground. Against lower-order batsmen, he bowled wider outside off stump to encourage drives towards fielders.

== Outside cricket ==
Waugh helps to raise funds for a leper children's colony, Udayan, in Kolkata. He reportedly also encouraged his players to learn about and enjoy the countries they visited and played in.

Waugh is a keen photographer and has produced several "tour diaries" which feature his images. In his latter years as a cricketer, he wrote for a number of newspapers. He insists on writing them himself rather than with the assistance of professional journalists. He is a prolific author and has written numerous tour diaries, leadership and self-help books such as Never Say Die and The Meaning of Luck. as well as an autobiography, Out of my Comfort Zone.

Waugh was named Australian of the Year in 2004, in recognition of both his sporting achievements and charity work. Waugh is married to Lynette with three children and was named Australian Father of the Year in 2005. Following retirement, Waugh established the Steve Waugh Foundation. The foundation is aimed at children who have a disease, an illness or an affliction that does not meet the set criteria of other charitable organisations.

Waugh has stated that he has declined "a number of" approaches by the Australian Labor Party to run for political office, expressing the view that he is not suited to politics.

== Honours ==
- He was named as the captain in Australia's "greatest ever ODI team."
- On 3 February 2009 Steve Waugh became the 30th cricketer inducted into the Australian Cricket Hall of Fame.
- Waugh was awarded the Australian Sports Medal on 14 July 2000.
- He was awarded the Allan Border Medal by the CA in 2001.
- Waugh was appointed Officer of the Order of Australia (AO) in the 2003 Birthday Honours "for service to cricket as a leading player, and to the community, particularly through the Udayan children's home."
- He was awarded the Australian of the Year award in 2004, for his cricketing feats also for his work with charities, most noticeably, Udayan Home in Barrackpore, India, helping children suffering with leprosy.

== Sources ==
- Egan, Jack (2004). One Who Will: The Search for Steve Waugh. Allen & Unwin. ISBN 9781741152296.
- Knight, James (2003). Mark Waugh: the biography. HarperCollins. ISBN 0-7322-7493-1.
- Perry, Roland (2000). Captain Australia: A history of the celebrated captains of Australian Test cricket. Sydney: Random House Australia. ISBN 1-74051-174-3.
- Piesse, Ken (1999). The Taylor Years: Australian cricket 1994–99. Penguin Books Australia. ISBN 0-670-88829-X.

Sporting positions
Preceded by Eric Simons	Nelson Cricket Club professional 1987	Succeeded by Anthon Ferreira
