= Mark Waugh =

Australian cricketer (born 1965)

Mark Waugh AM
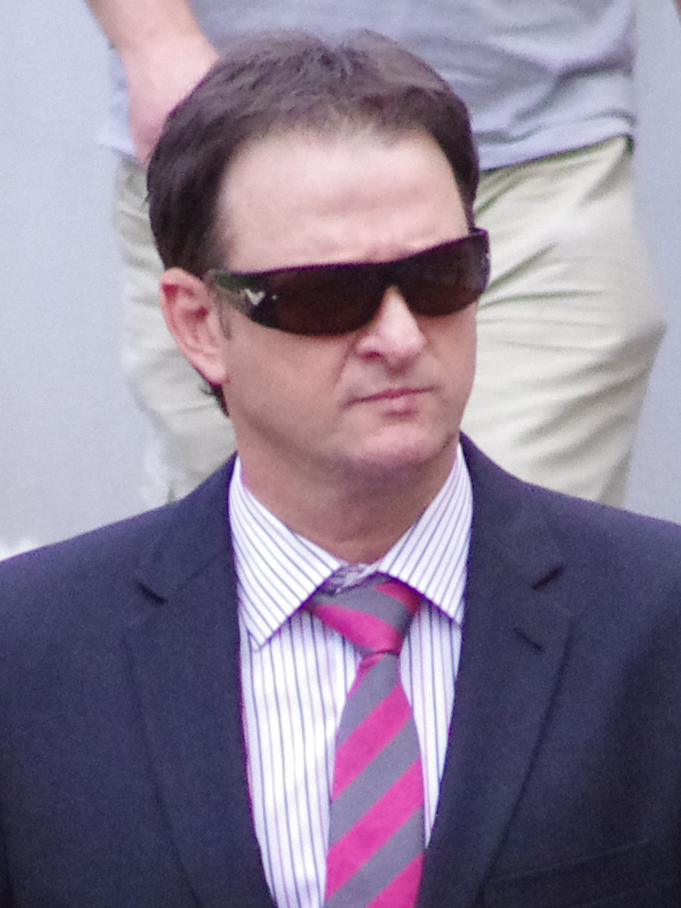
- Waugh in 2011

Personal information
- Full name: Mark Edward Waugh
- Born: 2 June 1965 (age 61); Campsie, New South Wales, Australia
- Nickname: Junior, Afghan
- Height: 6 ft 0 in (183 cm)
- Batting: Right-handed
- Bowling: Right-arm medium; Right-arm off-break
- Role: All-rounder
- Relatives: Steve Waugh (brother); Dean Waugh (brother)

International information
- National side: Australia (1988–2002)
- Test debut (cap 349): 25 January 1991 v England
- Last Test: 19 October 2002 v Pakistan
- ODI debut (cap 105): 11 December 1988 v Pakistan
- Last ODI: 3 February 2002 v South Africa
- ODI shirt no.: 6

Domestic team information
- Years: Team
- 1985/86–2003/04: New South Wales
- 1988–2002: Essex

Career statistics
Competition	Test	ODI	FC	LA
Matches	128	244	368	434
Runs scored	8,029	8,500	26,855	14,663
Batting average	41.81	39.35	52.04	39.10
100s/50s	20/47	18/50	81/133	27/85
Top score	153*	173	229*	173
Balls bowled	4,853	3,687	15,808	6,947
Wickets	59	85	208	173
Bowling average	41.16	34.56	40.98	33.42
5 wickets in innings	1	1	3	1
10 wickets in match	0	0	0	0
Best bowling	5/40	5/24	6/68	5/24
Catches/stumpings	181/–	108/–	452/–	201/–
Medal record
Men's Cricket
Representing Australia
ICC Cricket World Cup
Winner	1999 England-Wales -Ireland-Scotland-Netherlands
Runner-up	1996 India-Pakistan-Sri Lanka
Commonwealth Games
Silver medal – second place	1998 Kuala Lumpur
- Source: ESPNcricinfo, 19 August 2007

Mark Edward Waugh (born 2 June 1965) is an Australian cricket commentator and former international cricketer, who represented Australia in Test matches from early 1991 to late 2002, after previously making his One Day International (ODI) debut in 1988. Waugh was a part of the Australian team that won the 1999 Cricket World Cup.

Waugh is younger than his twin brother Steve Waugh by a few minutes. Dean Waugh, another of Mark's brothers, is also a cricketer, having played both first-class and List A cricket in Australia for New South Wales. His nephew and Steve's son, Austin Waugh, was selected in the Australian under-19 team. He was previously a national selector, holding that position until August 2018. On 15 May 2018, he announced his intentions to swap national selector duties for a TV commentating role with Fox Sports.

== Key achievements ==
Waugh was primarily a right-handed batsman who batted in the No. 4 position in Test matches. He was also a handy medium pace bowler, but changed to an off-spin bowler after back injuries restricted him. Waugh is regarded as one of the best slip fielders ever to play cricket and held the world record for most Test catches by a non-wicketkeeper until Rahul Dravid broke it in 2009.

He began as an all-rounder in the Australian ODI team, but he later focussed on batting and progressed to opening the batting, where he excelled and became Australia's leading one day runscorer. His three centuries at the 1996 Cricket World Cup made him the first batsman to ever achieve this feat, with the record later equaled by Indian captain Sourav Ganguly at the 2003 Cricket World Cup. This record was later broken by India's Rohit Sharma in 2019 Cricket World Cup with 5 centuries. A fourth century in the 1999 Cricket World Cup made him the only Australian to score four centuries and more than 1000 runs in World Cup competition. He was the 2nd highest scorer for Australia in the World Cup, behind his brother Steve.

Waugh is regarded as one of the most elegant and gifted stroke makers to ever play the game and his stylish strokeplay was likened to that of Stan McCabe, Alan Kippax, Victor Trumper, Charlie Macartney and Greg Chappell.

Following his debut Test century, Australian coach Bob Simpson compared Waugh's elegance to that of Archie Jackson. Mark Taylor called Waugh the "best-looking leg-side player I've seen in my time. . . anything drifting into his pads is hit beautifully."

His facile grace also led to accusations that he was a "lazy" batsman who was vulnerable to soft dismissals.

Waugh is the younger fraternal twin brother of Steve Waugh, with whom he played for most of his career and also under his captaincy.

== Early years ==
Born on 2 June 1965 at Canterbury Hospital in Campsie, New South Wales, Waugh was the second of twin boys born to Rodger and Beverley Waugh. He arrived four minutes after Steve. His father was a bank official and his mother was a teacher within the New South Wales Department of Education. The family settled in the western Sydney suburb of Panania. The twins were later joined by two more brothers, Dean and Danny. From an early age, the parents introduced their children to sport. By the age of six, the twins were playing organised soccer, tennis and cricket. In their first cricket match, the brothers were both dismissed for ducks.

The twins came from a sporting family. Their paternal grandfather Edward was a greyhound trainer. Raised in the northern coastal town of Bangalow, Edward earned selection for the New South Wales Country team in rugby league. He was about to join Eastern Suburbs in the New South Wales Rugby League, but had to give up his career due to family reasons. Rodger was Edward's only son and was promising tennis player, who was ranked eighth in Australia in his junior years and was the state champion at under-14 level. On the maternal side, Bev was a tennis player who won the under-14 singles at the South Australian Championships. Her eldest brother Dion Bourne was an opening batsman who played for Bankstown in Sydney Grade Cricket and remains the leading runscorer in the club's history.

The twins made their first representative cricket team when they were selected the Bankstown District under-10s at the age of eight. In 1976, the twins were the youngest ever to be selected in the New South Wales Primary Schools' soccer team. Playing for Panania Primary School, the twins swept their school to win the Umbro International Shield, a statewide knockout soccer competition, scoring all of their team's three goals in the final. They were a key part of their school's consecutive state cricket championships and were part of school tennis team that came second in the state in their final year. In their final year, Mark was the captain of the state primary school cricket and tennis teams, both of which won the national championships. The twins were instrumental in New South Wales winning the cricket carnival without a defeat.

By this time, the increasing time demands led to conflicts between the sports and were in one case delisted from a team due to a conflict of commitments. The twins progressed to East Hills Boys Technology High School, which had a history of producing Australian international representatives in a number of sports. Aged 13, the twins were invited by their uncle Bourne, then the captain of Bankstown's first grade team, to trial for the club's under-16 team for the Green Shield and both were selected. Aged fourteen, both made their senior grade cricket debut in 1979–80, playing in the Fourth XI. The twins broke into East Hills Boys First XI in the same season and achieved the same level in soccer. In 1980–81 the brothers were elevated to the Third XI mid-season. Mark's performance in the Green Shield saw him selected in Bankstown's under-21 team, still aged 15. The brothers often won formed a two-man team—in one match, Mark scored a century and then the brothers took 16/85 between them. At the end of 1980, the twins were selected in the state under-16 team for the national carnival, with Mark as vice-captain.

When Mark was 16, he grew around one foot in one year. It was a relief, because he had been diagnosed with the repetitive stress injury Osgood-Schlatter disease at 15 and told that he would not grow any further than his then height of 152 cm. The pair changed soccer teams to play in the reserve grade for Sydney Croatia in the state league and the pair were paid small amounts in the professional league. However, they quickly left as their cricket careers increasingly demanded more time.

The brothers were promoted to Bankstown's Second XI, before being selected for the First XI in the 1982–83 season, aged 17, both making their debut against Western Suburbs, with Mark making 97 on debut, ending the season with 427 runs at 30.50. This placed him second in his team's aggregates and he contributed 14 wickets at 10.71. By this time, his coaches had already identified the traits by which Mark was to be characterised in his international career, those of apparent laziness and reliable catching.

The twins finished high school at the end of 1983. In 1983–84, both were members of New South Wales Combined High Schools and the state under-19 team. Mark was named as the player of the series after scoring two centuries. The brothers were then selected for Australia for the first time. They had been named in the national under-19 team to play a Test and ODI series against the touring Sri Lankan counterparts. The under-19 series pitted several future international players against one another. Mark scored 123 in the second Test at the Adelaide Oval.

Waugh did not contemplate going to university; both he and his brother became sports equipment salesmen. He made his maiden First XI century during the season, scoring 108 against Mosman.

At the start of the 1984–85 season, the brothers were included in the New South Wales state squad.

== Formative professional career ==
At the end of the season, the Waugh twins signed a contract to spend the Australian winter to play for Egerton in the Bolton League in Lancashire in northern England. Each club was allowed to have one professional; Steve was officially designated as such but would split the earnings with Mark. The twins were billeted with a local family. However, during the year, an Australian rebel tour to South Africa was staged, breaking the boycott against the apartheid regime. Some players defected from the Australian Test team to play in South Africa. This resulted in Dave Gilbert being promoted to the national squad, forcing him to forfeit his Esso scholarship, which allowed him to play Second XI cricket in the County Championship. Steve was selected to replace Gilbert with Essex, leaving Mark as the lone professional. Waugh struggled at first, but recovered to score six centuries for the season. As a reward for scoring more than 800 runs and taking more than 50 wickets, Waugh's captain, who was a dentist, gave him free service. Waugh eventually finished the season with 1460 runs and 75 wickets, breaking the club runscoring record by more than 200 runs.

Waugh returned to Australia for the 1985–86 season, looking to make his First-class debut. He scored 177 against Petersham in just five hours and was selected for the state Second XI. Then, an opportunity arose with further ramifications of the rebel tours of South Africa. A two-year ban on playing state cricket was imposed on the players. This meant that New South Wales was looking for two new opening batsmen, as both Steve Smith and John Dyson had defected and been banned. Waugh and Taylor were selected to make their Sheffield Shield debut.

== Domestic career ==
=== First-class cricket ===
Waugh and Mark Taylor opened on debut against Tasmania at Hobart's TCA Ground. New South Wales were sent into bat and Waugh was dismissed for 13 and New South Wales fell to 3/60 in the first innings. He scored 28 in the second innings, but the drawn match was more notable for an incident on the third morning, when the new opening pair overslept on Taylor's 21st birthday. They were punished by coach Bob Simpson with fielding drills, forcing the pair to take hundreds of catches. He took his first catch, that of Roger Woolley on debut. Waugh fell on tough times, being dismissed for a duck and four by Test bowler Merv Hughes in the next match against Victoria and then 17 and a run out for another duck against the touring New Zealand. With a First-class average of 10.33, Waugh was dropped for the next five matches. However, for the final four matches of the season, Waugh was recalled to the team as a front-line fast bowler and middle order batsman. He took 4/130 in the first innings against Queensland in his first match in the role. They were his first First-class wickets. His bowling was characterised by his liberal use of short-pitched bowling. In the next match against Tasmania, Waugh opened the bowling with Mike Whitney, due to injuries to other bowlers, taking 2/31 in the first innings. Waugh then took 3/49 in the final round robin match against Queensland, before the teams met again in the Sheffield Shield final at the Sydney Cricket Ground. Whitney and Waugh were New South Wales' only pacemen and Waugh bowled 27 overs to take 1/71. Batting at No. 7, Waugh was involved in a century stand with Greg Dyer to help avoid the follow on with 41. Waugh made only 24 in the second innings as the home team hung on for a draw to secure the Shield. Waugh had scored 167 runs at 15.18 and took 11 wickets at 32.00 for the season. He played in one limited overs match, scoring 13 and taking 1/28 against Victoria.

At this stage of his career, Waugh lived in the shadow of his brother Steve, who was promoted to the Australian team at the age of 20. As a result, Mark was sometimes called Afghan, a reference to the 1979 Soviet invasion of Afghanistan, sometimes dubbed the "forgotten war". Building up an impressive record at First-class level, Waugh spent two seasons with English county Essex as the team's successor to Allan Border as an overseas professional. In 1987–88 and 1989–90, he was voted the Sheffield Shield Player of the Year.

In mid-1988, Waugh was signed to replace Australian captain Allan Border for a six-week stint as the overseas professional at Essex County Cricket Club in England, after just one full season of Sheffield Shield. Border had to leave before the end of the season because of the Australian tour of Pakistan and had recommended Waugh, who arrived with high expectations. Essex were one of the strongest teams in England and Border had scored six centuries that season. Waugh's debut came in August in a limited overs match against Nottinghamshire at Colchester. After struggling at the start of his innings, Waugh found his rhythm and reached 103 from only 94 balls, accumulating his second 50 in just 28 balls. He ended with 15 fours and a six and then took 2/16 with the ball. Waugh played in three First-class matches, scoring 178 runs at 44.50. His performances were enough to prompt Essex officials to invite him to return for the 1989 season. Waugh accepted, subject to him not being selected for the 1989 Ashes tour of England with the national side.

In the longer form, Waugh continued to be overlooked and was criticised for his apparently casual attitude. Simpson, now the Australia coach, criticised Waugh, believing that he was not fully exploiting his talent. He scored only one half-century in the remainder of the First-class season, ending the season with 727 First-class runs at 40.39. He did not take a wicket for the season. He was overlooked for the 1989 Ashes tour.

In 1989, Waugh returned to Essex for his first full season as the overseas professional. He began slowly with a 77 against Derbyshire being his only score beyond 50 in his first six innings. He then scored 92 and took 3/23 against Cambridge University and then three fifties in the next six innings, including 89 not out against Leicestershire. Waugh then broke through for his first First-class county century, scoring 109 at Ilford in late June against Hampshire, whose pace attack was led by Malcolm Marshall. He then scored 112 not out against Glamorgan in a one-dayer, but had another lean run in the County Championship, failing to pass 30 in nine consecutive innings. Waugh returned to form with 110 against Middlesex, before scoring an unbeaten century against Australia in a tour match. He scored 100 from 165 deliveries, while Steve reached his century in 101 balls for Australia. Waugh finished his season with 165 against Leicester. He had scored 1537 runs at 43.91. He took 31 catches in 24 matches and took 14 wickets at 29.62. Essex finished second in the County Championship, six points behind Worcestershire. They would have won were it not for the 25-point penalty that was incurred for pitch-doctoring. Essex paid Waugh and his teammates championship-winning bonuses, indicating their belief that they were the rightful champions. Essex reached the final of the Benson & Hedges Cup against Nottinghamshire. Waugh made 41 from 58 balls before his team lost after conceding the winning runs from the last ball of the match.

In the first Sheffield Shield match of the season, Waugh scored 172 from 301 balls, his highest First-class score to date. He hit 20 boundaries. He then struck 42 and took three wickets against Sri Lanka, but was overlooked for the Test against New Zealand. He scored 46 and 18 and took 1/31 and 2/34 against Queensland, before striking and unbeaten 100 against Victoria. Despite this Waugh was not selected for the opening phase of the season's ODI tournament. At the start of 1990, he went three innings without passing 30, before striking another unbeaten century against Victoria. New South Wales was then sent in at the Sydney Cricket Ground and Waugh struck 137 from 185 runs on the first day, including a six from Peter Sleep that narrowly missed the clock tower. The Sydney Morning Herald opined that "Waugh would imperiously render them [the fielders] obsolete, going over, between and sometimes through them".

Waugh returned to state duty and New South Wales needed to beat Tasmania in their last match to qualify for the final. They were struggling at 3/33 in reply to Tasmania's 117 when Waugh came to the crease and made 198 not out from 390 balls. New South Wales won by an innings to reach the Shield final against Queensland. Waugh scored an unbeaten 78 in the second innings as his team won the title. Waugh ended the Sheffield Shield as the top-scorer, with 967 runs at 80.85, prompting the Australian Broadcasting Corporation (ABC) to select him as its Player of the Year. It noted that Waugh's "characteristic blend of dash and elegance . . .seemed to be reinforced now by extra application and determination."

In 1990, Waugh and his brother combined in an unbeaten partnership of 464 in 407 minutes for New South Wales against Western Australia at the WACA Ground, setting a world First-class record for the fifth wicket. Both teams were at full strength and Western Australia's attack included Test bowlers Terry Alderman, Bruce Reid and Chris Matthews. The twins ended unbeaten with 216 and 229 respectively.

On the tour of England in 1993, Waugh scored 174 against Surrey and reclaimed his Test position from Damien Martyn. He scored an ODI and a Test century in matches at Edgbaston.

== International career ==
=== Debut years ===
Waugh was seeking to force his way into the Australian team at the start of the 1988–89 season. He started poorly, with a duck and 18 against Queensland and not taking a wicket. In the next match he made a duck and appeared to be in control in the second innings when he was run out for 46. He then faced the touring West Indies, Waugh was dismissed for nine in the first innings. In the second innings, Waugh bounced back to score an unbeaten 103 from 163 balls against the team regarded as the best in the world at the time, earning praise from their captain Viv Richards. In the following match against Tasmania, Waugh was immediately out for a duck attempting a cut shot, but made 100 not out in the second innings. He then scored 69 and 39 against Western Australia. Waugh was overlooked for Test selection, but was selected in the ODI squad for the start of the triangular tournament against the West Indies and Pakistan. It was to be the first time that twins played international cricket for Australia.

Waugh made his ODI debut against Pakistan at the Adelaide Oval in December, but did not bat or bowl as Australia took a nine-wicket victory. Two days later against the West Indies in Sydney, Waugh took his first ODI catch when he caught Gordon Greenidge from Peter Taylor. He batted for the first time, partnering his brother during a run chase, scoring 18 from 19 balls. Steve was run out, something that was to occur multiple times while they batted together. Australia lost by one run. Waugh made 32 in the next match against the West Indies, and again Steve was run out while they were batting together. Waugh was omitted for the next three ODIs but returned to make 12 against Pakistan before scoring 42 from 53 in the final round-robin match against the West Indies. Waugh was omitted for the first final, which Australia won by two runs, before replacing Simon O'Donnell in the second match. He took two catches in the second match and scored 22 and five as Australia lost both to concede the series. Waugh ended his first international series with 131 runs at 21.83.

Waugh returned to Australia in preparation for the 1989–90 season, having been overlooked for the ODI squad for the Nehru Cup in India. At the start of the season, the Australian selectors wanted Waugh to tighten up before he could be selected for Tests. He was selected for his only ODI season in 1990, scoring 14 in the second final as Australia won the series, and was overlooked of the New Zealand tour in March 1990.

=== Test century on debut ===
At the age of 25, he was finally picked for his Test debut in 1990–91, which resulted in mixed emotions: his place in the team game came at the expense of his out-of-form brother, who had only scored 82 runs at 20.50 for the series. Playing against England in the fourth Test at the Adelaide Oval, Waugh came to the crease in the first innings on the first day with Australia in trouble at 4/104. The situation deteriorated when Australia fell to 5/126 and Greg Matthews joined Waugh at the crease. The pair batted until the end of the day, and Waugh brought up his century with a square drive late on the first day. This made him the fifteenth Australian to make a century on debut. Phil Wilkins of The Sydney Morning Herald wrote that "Such a maiden Test century could hardly have been surpassed for commanding presence". Waugh was widely lauded for the style and elegance of his innings. Waugh ended the day at 116 not out and was bowled early on the second morning for 138 by paceman Devon Malcolm to end a 171-run stand with Matthews. His innings had taken only 188 deliveries and featured heavy scoring through leg-side flicks. Waugh made 23 in the second innings and took his first Test catch, Mike Atherton, caught from the bowling of Bruce Reid. The match was drawn and Waugh experienced his first Test victory when he scored 26 in the fifth Test in Perth as Australia sealed the series 3–0. His performances saw him selected for the early 1991 tour of the West Indies, to play in five Tests and five ODIs against the world's most powerful team. Australia had not won a Test series in the Caribbean for 18 years against a team known for their physically intimidating fast bowlers.

In the first tour match against Jamaica, Waugh was felled by a bouncer from Courtney Walsh, but recovered to score a century despite the presence of his teammate's spilt blood on the pitch. Waugh scored 67 from 66 balls in the first ODI at Sabina Park in Kingston as Australia took a 1–0 lead. The ODI series was interrupted by the first Test, also at Sabina Park. Waugh scored 39 in a rain-affected draw, later admitting to having felt out of his depth against the hostile fast bowling—blood was spilt on both sides. The ODI series resumed and after consecutive matches without passing 20, Waugh played a large part in victory in the fourth match that gave Australia the series win. He scored 49 from only 37 balls and then took 3/34 to seal a 37-run win. He ended the series with 156 runs at 31.20 and eight wickets at 18.25. The Test series resumed and Waugh scored 71 in the second Test as Australia lost by ten wickets.

The brothers played their first Test match together in the third Test at Queen's Park Oval in Trinidad. Waugh top-scored with 64 in the first innings of another rain-affected draw, before taking his first Test wicket, Curtly Ambrose. He admitted that he was pleased that the weather prevented him from having to spend more time facing the West Indian pacemen. He did not pass 20 in the fourth Test in Bridgetown, Barbados, as the West Indies retained the Frank Worrell Trophy 2–0 with a 343-run victory. He was the most successful bowler in the second innings, taking 4/80, including the wicket of Viv Richards. His bowling included short-pitched bowling, reasoning that the Australians were going to be bounced anyway.

In the fifth Test of the series in St. John's, Antigua, Waugh made 139 not out from 188 balls. Devising a different strategy of combating the short-pitched bowling, Waugh backed away from the stumps and sliced the bowlers over the slips cordon. Shielding the tailenders from the West Indies fast bowlers, he still managed to score a century between tea and stumps. He reached his century in 133 minutes and was unbeaten at the end of the innings with 11 fours and three sixes. Australia made 403 in the first day and went on to win the match. Waugh ended the Test series with 367 runs at 61.17, the best among the Australians, in addition to taking eight wickets at 22.83.

=== Run of bad form ===
During the 1991–92 Australian summer, Waugh hit a patch of bad form. He was dropped from the ODI team in the early part of the season, then omitted from the Test team in favour of Tom Moody for the fifth Test against India in Perth. Following his recall to the ODI team in place of the injured Bruce Reid, Waugh scored only 20 runs at 6.67.

He was part of the team that failed to make the semi-finals of the 1992 World Cup, but did not play the entire tournament due to his poor form. After scoring two in the opening match against New Zealand at Eden Park, he was dropped for three games, then played in the last four matches. His best effort was an unbeaten 66 from 39 balls against Zimbabwe at Bellerive Oval. On the tour of Sri Lanka that followed, Waugh returned to the Test team and scored five and 56 in the first Test but followed it with four consecutive ducks.

A score of 112 at the Melbourne Cricket Ground in the second Test of 1992–93 helped set up an Australian victory and a 1–0 lead in the Frank Worrell Trophy series against the West Indies. During that season's World Series Cup, he scored a half-century and took 5/24 as Australia successfully defended a small total.

=== ODI opener ===
After two unproductive Tests on the 1993 New Zealand tour, Waugh was dropped for the third Test, this time in favour of the younger Damien Martyn. In the ODI series, Australia opted for a new strategy and promoted Waugh to open the batting. He scored 60 and 57 in the first two matches to help set up an Australian victory, then scored his maiden ODI century, 108 in Hamilton. A score of 83 in the final match made him the leading batsman of the series with 308 runs at 61.60.

In the second Test at Lord's—the spiritual home of cricket— Waugh started on six on the second morning scored quickly to reach 99. He was looking for his century during an over by Phil Tufnell. Tufnell was employing his customary defensive approach of pitching the ball outside the leg stump with a leg side field. The first ball was a half-volley and Waugh hit it straight from the middle of the bat. However, the ball hit the short leg fielder in the shins. Later in the over, another leg side ball hit his pads, rolled between his legs and onto the stumps, meaning that Waugh missed out on his century.

Tufnell dismissed him more than ten times in Test matches utilising this tactic. A century against New Zealand in Hobart brought Waugh's total to 987 Test runs for the calendar year.

=== Bribery claims ===
Starting 1994 well, Waugh was named Player of the Finals against South Africa in the World Series Cup and he then scored a century against the same opponents in the drawn third Test in Durban. Later in the year, Waugh claimed that Pakistan captain Saleem Malik had offered him (along with Tim May and Shane Warne) money to perform poorly during a match on the tour of Pakistan. Waugh's performances were beyond reproach: he scored three half-centuries in the Tests and an ODI century during the match in question.

In the first Test of 1994–95, Waugh hit his highest score yet, 140 against England in Brisbane. In the second innings, Australia was seeking quick runs to set up a declaration. Waugh's old sparring partner Tufnell was bowling defensive to a packed leg side field. Waugh attempted a reverse sweep for the first time in his career, attempting to collect runs in the sparsely patrolled off side, but only managed to hit the ball onto his stumps and was bowled for 15. Australia went on to win the Test and Waugh contributed 71 and 29 in another win in Melbourne.

Waugh failed to pass 25 in the rain-affected draw in the third Test in Sydney, before claiming career-best bowling figures of 5/40 in a losing team during the second innings of the fourth Test in Adelaide. In the fifth Test at the WACA, Waugh scored 88 in the first innings before returning as a runner for the injured Craig McDermott. He was run out in a mix-up with his brother while looking for the single that would have given Steve his century. This left his brother on 99 not out with Australia all out. Waugh contributed a further three wickets as Australia completed a 3–1 series win.

On the subsequent tour of the West Indies, Waugh scored what Paul Reiffel described as a "nonchalantly [...] beautiful" 126 and combined with his brother for a 231-run partnership in the deciding fourth Test in Jamaica. This set up victory and Australia's first series win over the West Indies since 1975–76.

Waugh had a productive and consistent 1995–96 Australian summer, scoring two centuries and four half-centuries in six Tests against Pakistan and Sri Lanka. He passed 50 in each Test. The series against Pakistan started amidst a new development in the bribery claims against Malik. A Pakistan Cricket Board (PCB) inquiry cleared Malik and speculated that Waugh and the Australians had concocted the claims. At the start of the season, back injuries forced him to convert to bowling off-spin a during the season. During the first Test in Brisbane, Waugh scored 59 as Australia took an innings victory. He also took his first Test wicket as a spin bowler, that of Inzamam-ul-Haq. Waugh scored 88 in the second Test win in Hobart and the teams moved to Sydney, where Australia sought a clean sweep. He had a poor Test record on his home ground, having accumulated only 126 runs in seven innings at the ground. Waugh's 116 from 206 balls was highlighted by his battle against the spinners Mushtaq Ahmed and Saqlain Mushtaq and was the mainstay of Australia's first innings of 257. Australia were set 247 for victory and were well placed at 2/117, with Waugh having scored 34 from only 46 deliveries. He was given out caught behind, although the ball only flicked his pad. Australia subsequently collapsed to be all out for 172, losing the Test. Despite the loss, Waugh had compiled 300 runs at 60.00 for the series.

The series against Sri Lanka had started in Perth with speculation regarding Waugh's four consecutive Test ducks. After four hours, Waugh reached his century and ended with 111 to end his run of ducks. On reaching his century, he gestured to a section of the crowd who had been heckling him. Australia won by an innings and Waugh then scored 61 in another innings victory in the second Test in Melbourne. He was batting when off-spinner Muttiah Muralitharan was repeatedly no-balled for throwing by Darrell Hair, before being bowled by the spinner. Waugh scored 71 in the third Test and ended with 255 runs at 63.75 in a series clean sweep.

During the triangular ODI tournament, Waugh was the Man of the Match in the opening game against the West Indies at the Adelaide Oval, scoring 53 and conceding only 26 runs in 10 overs. Later in the tournament, Waugh returned to the opening position after the omission of Michael Slater, a position he retained until his retirement. In his first match in the role, Waugh scored 130 from 144 balls against Sri Lanka at the WACA Ground. At the time, the innings was the third-highest ODI score by an Australian and the opening partnership of 189 with Taylor was the seventh-highest of all time. In the second final, Waugh made 73 in a 135-run partnership with Taylor and then in an unorthodox tactic, he opened the bowling with his off-spin, taking 1/31. Waugh ended the summer with 357 runs at 35.70 and took six wickets.

=== 1996 World Cup ===
Waugh was one of the leading players at the 1996 Cricket World Cup in the Indian subcontinent. Opening the batting, he scored 130 from 130 balls in Australia's opening game against Kenya in Visakhapatnam. He combined in a 207-run partnership with his brother, the first double-century stand in World Cup history. He followed this up with 126 from 135 balls against India in Bombay, frequently hitting through cover and midwicket. The innings made him the first player to score consecutive centuries in World Cup competition. Waugh then dismissed Sachin Tendulkar for 90 when he looked likely to win the game for India. Tendulkar charged down the pitch to Waugh's off spin, who responded by bowling a wide, resulting in the Indian's stumping. Waugh was named Man of the Match on both occasions. He made an unbeaten 76 against Zimbabwe in a nine-wicket win in Nagpur. He scored only 30 from 63 balls, but took 3/38 in the final group game against the West Indies in Jaipur, which Australia lost. Australia progressed to the quarter-finals, where they faced New Zealand in Madras, he scored his third century (110) to guide a successful Australian run chase, again winning the man of the match. The innings took Waugh's tournament tally to 472 runs, the record for Australia in a single tournament. Although he managed only 0 and 12 in the semi-final and final, Waugh finished the tournament with 484 runs at an average of 80.66 and a strike rate of 85.36, second only to Tendulkar. He contributed five wickets with the ball.

After a four-month break, Waugh returned to international duty with a short tour of the subcontinent. In two tournaments, he scored 207 runs at 25.88 in eight matches, scoring exactly 50 in two matches and taking eight wickets at 36.00. The Australians then lost a one-off Test against Delhi at Feroz Shah Kotla Ground, with Waugh scoring 26 and 23. He took his best First-class career bowling figures of 6/68 in the tour match against the Indian Board President's XI in Patiala that preceded the Test.

Waugh had a consistent series despite failing to score a century in the five Tests against the West Indies during the 1996–97 home season, He scored four half-centuries, only failing to pass 50 in the third Test, ending the series with 370 runs at 41.11. During the second innings of the second Test in Sydney, Waugh collided with batting partner Matthew Elliott, causing Elliott to be taken from the ground on a stretcher due to a knee injury. The fifth Test in Perth marked the 44th time that the Waugh brothers had played together in Tests, surpassing the world record set by Ian and Greg Chappell in the 1970s. In the limited overs format, Waugh was Australia's leading runscorer in the triangular ODI tournament with 358 runs at 59.66, making 102 against the West Indies in Brisbane. He had scored 1059 ODI runs in the 1996 calendar year. However, the team performance was poor and Australia missed the finals for the first time in 17 years. His batting partner Taylor particularly struggled, with only 143 runs at 17.87, attracting substantial media criticism.

The Australian summer was followed by a tour of South Africa. Waugh made 26 in the opening Test, which Australia won by an innings. In the second Test in Port Elizabeth, Australia were skittled in the first innings for 108 and were forced to chase 270 for victory on a seaming wicket. Waugh came to the crease with Australia at 2/30 on the third afternoon. After a hard-fought afternoon, Australia reached the close of play at 3/154 with Waugh on 54. The next morning he continued to his century, before he was bowled for 116, leaving Australia at 6/258. Australia lost two more wickets, but stumbled to victory with two wickets in hand. The five and half-hour innings is often regarded as his finest Test performance. Waugh ended the series with 209 runs at 41.80.

In the ODI series, he hit an unbeaten 115 to steer at a successful run chase in the second match in Port Elizabeth, hitting consecutive sixes to reach his century. He missed several matches due to injury—the first match due to a back problem and then two further matches when he split his hand webbing while failing to take a catch in the third match. Apart from the century, he scored only three further runs at ended with 118 runs at 59.00 for the series.

Waugh proceeded to England for his second Ashes tour in 1997 and gained attention upon his arrival for questioning the hunger and toughness of the home team. He scored 131 runs at 43.66 as Australia lost all three ODIs, with a top-score of 95 in the final match at The Oval. In the first Test at Edgbaston, Waugh made 5 and 1 as Australia suffered a nine-wicket loss. The English media and public reminded Waugh of his pre-series comments about the England cricket team. To make matters worse, he was hospitalised for two days in the middle of the match with suspected appendicitis. The condition was eventually diagnosed as a severe viral infection. Waugh made only 209 runs at 20.90 for the series, with only one half-century. He hit two centuries in the tour matches, including one against Middlesex at Lord's. In the sixth Test, he was dismissed in both innings by his old sparring partner Tufnell, who he had criticised at the start of the series as a "fairly weak sort of player".

Waugh's performances in England had stirred questions about his position in the team. The scrutiny increased after Waugh failed to pass 20 in the first Test against New Zealand in Brisbane and dropped a catch. Waugh made a turnaround in the second Test in Perth, taking a horizontal airborne catch of Chris Cairns at full stretch. He proceeded to score 86, including a lofted drive from Daniel Vettori onto the roof of the Lillee-Marsh Stand. The ball travelled approximately 130 m, one of the longest sixes in history. Australia went on to win the match and Waugh made 81 in the third Test and ended the series with 196 runs at 39.20, enough to save his position in the team.

=== Consecutive centuries ===
In the 1997–98 Test series against South Africa, Waugh finished the year with 0 and 1 against South Africa in the Boxing Day Test match in Melbourne. Waugh scored 100 in the New Year's Test at the Sydney Cricket Ground to set up an Australian victory. This came during a 116-run partnership with his brother, noted for a particularly menacing spell by Allan Donald with the second new ball, repeatedly hitting the twins. He batted out the entire fifth day for an unbeaten 115 in the third Test at the Adelaide Oval to deny the South Africans a victory and win the series for Australia. Having scored 63 in the first innings, Waugh came the crease late on the fourth day with Australia at 2/17 and attempting to survive for a draw. He was dropped early and was 11 at stumps. Waugh continued to resist on the following day and brought up his century. Struck by a bouncer from Shaun Pollock late on the final day, Waugh broke the stumps with his bat while walking away, so South Africa appealed for hit wicket, which was denied. South African skipper Hansie Cronje later speared a stump through the umpires' dressing room in anger at the decision. It was only the second time in his career that he had scored consecutive centuries. Waugh took satisfaction in the fact that his century was responsible for saving the Test. He finished the series with 279 runs at 69.75.

The 1997–98 Australian season marked a change in Waugh's ODI career. The Australian selectors changed their policy and picked Test and ODI teams separately, with specialists chosen accordingly in either form of the game. Waugh's captain and opening partner Taylor was dropped. Australia had trouble finding a suitable partner for Waugh, with Michael di Venuto, Tom Moody and Stuart Law all trialled as his opening partner. Despite the instability, Waugh compiled 104 to help Australia successfully chase a target against New Zealand in a round-robin match at the Adelaide Oval. He finished the series as Australia's leading runscorer with 320 runs at 35.55, and took seven wickets at 25.43. During the finals series, new wicketkeeper Adam Gilchrist was elevated to the opening position. The new combination got off to a poor start, with Waugh run out for three in a mix-up in the first final, but the pair went on to become Australia's long term opening pair. After losing all four group matches to South Africa, Australia won the finals series 2–1. The partnership with Gilchrist marked a shift in Waugh's role in ODIs. Waugh had previously been more aggressive while Taylor was his partner, but with the naturally aggressive Gilchrist as his partner, Waugh tended to anchor the innings.

Waugh's strong start to the year continued in two brief ODI series in New Zealand and India, in which he scored 374 runs at 41.56 respectively, with three half-centuries. Australia lost the first two Tests in India, with Waugh scoring 66 in the first innings in the first Test in Chennai but otherwise failing to pass 20. In the third Test in Bangalore, Waugh scored his highest Test score of 153 not out while suffering nausea, vomiting and fever. He was 58 at stumps on the second day before being taken ill and requiring overnight injections. It was the first time that he had batted without his helmet, instead using a floppy hat due to the heat and fever. He claimed that he could not recall much of the innings and was batting on "automatic pilot". Waugh was the only Australian to aggregate more than 200 runs for the series, finishing with 280 runs at 70.00. Australia played nine more ODIs for the year in Asia, spread across three series. Waugh scored 266 runs at 23.25. Waugh was also a part of the limited overs team that won a silver medal at the 1998 Commonwealth Games in Kuala Lumpur, Malaysia, losing the final to South Africa. The matches were not accredited as ODIs by the International Cricket Council (ICC).

Australia toured Pakistan in late 1998. In the first Test in Rawalpindi, Waugh scored a duck as Australia won by an innings, its first Test win in Pakistan in 39 years. His tour was disrupted by an appearance at a judicial hearing to give evidence relating to allegations of match-fixing he made against Saleem Malik. After making 42 and 43 in the high-scoring second Test in Peshawar, Waugh scored 117 in the second innings of the third Test in Karachi to end the series with 228 runs at 45.60.

=== Bribery scandal re-emerges ===
Waugh made starts in all four innings of the first two Ashes Tests in Australia in 1998–99, scoring 31, 27*, 36 and 17* as the first two matches were drawn and won respectively. In the build-up to the third Test in Adelaide, news broke that in 1994–95 Waugh and Shane Warne had accepted money from an Indian bookmaker in exchange for pitch and weather information. The Australian Cricket Board (ACB) has secretly fined both players for their actions. The ACB's suppression of the case and the actions of the two players were widely condemned.

Waugh was booed when he went out to bat in the first innings and, apparently rattled by the hostile reception, he batted scratchily for 36 minutes before being dismissed for seven. He regarded it as the most difficult day of his career. In the second innings, he scored an unbeaten 51 and was given a standing ovation by some parts of the crowd in contrast to other hostile sections. He took three catches in England's second innings as Australia won the match to retain the Ashes. Waugh scored 36 and 43 in the Boxing Day Test at the Melbourne Cricket Ground, which saw him pass 1,000 Test runs for the calendar year.

Waugh started 1999 as he did the previous year, with a century in the New Year's Test at the Sydney Cricket Ground. After being dropped before he had scored, Waugh scored 121 in five hours on the first day, sharing a partnership of 190 with his brother. He became the fifth Australian to take 100 Test catches when he caught Nasser Hussain in the first innings from the bowling of Colin Miller. Australia won the Test and Waugh ended the series with 393 runs at 56.14, placing him second in the batting averages. In the ODI series, he scored six consecutive half-centuries in a consistent run that augured well for the upcoming World Cup. His tally of 542 runs at 49.27 was the highest for the tournament. For the majority of the ODI tournament, Waugh acted as vice-captain to Warne as his brother Steve was sidelined by a hamstring strain.

=== 1999 World Cup ===
Taylor retired after the Australian summer and Waugh's brother became the Test captain and the first assignment was a tour of the Caribbean. Waugh had a modest Test series, finishing with 202 runs at 25.25 as Australia retained the Frank Worrell Trophy 2–2. His best score was 67 in the first innings of second Test, which was terminated when he was bowled by a ball that scooted along the ground. Speculation about his future began to simmer again. He then made 217 runs at 31.00 in the ODIs, Australia's second highest runscorer, before the team headed to England for the 1999 World Cup.

Waugh started the tournament with a Man of the Match 67 against Scotland in Worcester as Australia unconvincingly won by four wickets in its first match. He then scored two and 41 as Australia lost to New Zealand and Pakistan respectively, leaving them needing to avoid defeat in all of their remaining matches to win the World Cup. Waugh scored only 33 and three as Australia defeated Bangladesh and the West Indies to progress to the Super Six phase. Needing to win all their matches, Waugh top-scored with 83 against India at The Oval in a win. He then scored 104 from 120 balls against Zimbabwe at Lord's in another victory. In the process, he passed Allan Border's Australian record of 6,524 ODI career runs and became the first person to score four centuries in World Cup competition. He dedicated this achievement to his dying grandfather. He was then run out for five in the final Super Six match against South Africa. In the semi-final against same team, he was dismissed without scoring. Waugh participated in the final play of the match. With the scores tied in the last over of South Africa's run chase and with one wicket remaining, he fielded the ball as Lance Klusener and Allan Donald attempted the winning run. The South Africans had a mix-up and a run out resulted in a tie. The Australians progressed to the final as they had won their previous meeting.

In the final against Pakistan at Lord's, he set the tone of the match with a sideways diving catch to dismiss Wajahatullah Wasti. Pakistan were bowled out for 132. Waugh was 37 not out when Darren Lehmann struck the winning runs. He finished the tournament with 375 runs at 41.67, making him Australia's second highest runscorer for the tournament.

In late 1999, Australia toured Sri Lanka. Waugh continued to perform in the ODIs, with 174 runs at 34.80, but his Test troubles continued with 29 runs at 7.25. In six Tests on the island nation, he had managed 90 runs at an average of 9.00. Australia proceeded to Zimbabwe, where Waugh scored 90 in a ten-wicket win. Had he reached his century, Waugh would have become the first player to record centuries against the eight other Test-playing nations. Waugh then scored 106 from 97 balls in the first ODI before scoring 54* in the second match. That ended his ODI year, with a total of 1468 runs at 44.48.

=== Close to omission and 100th Test match ===
He made a strong start to the 1999–00 Australian summer, scoring 100 in the first Test against Pakistan in Brisbane and then taking a reflex catch to dismiss Inzamam-ul-Haq in the second Test at Bellerive Oval, although he only scored five and a duck. However, after a duck in the third Test in Perth, he gave a poor display in the first Test against India at the Adelaide Oval which led to calls for his axing. After being dismissed for five in the first innings, he came out to bat in the second innings late on the third day and was protected from the strike by Greg Blewett, who refused to take singles hit into the outfield. After being jeered, he was eventually dismissed the next day for eight, after batting almost an hour. Waugh made only one and 25 in an interstate match following the Test but was retained for the Boxing Day Test at the Melbourne Cricket Ground. He managed a survivalist 41 in the first innings and an unbeaten 51 against the backdrop of a supportive crowd. He was then on a hat-trick in the second innings as Australia won the Test. Waugh was retained and made his 100th Test appearance in the 2000 New Year's Test in Sydney, where he scored 32 in his only innings.

Further poor displays in the early phase of the subsequent ODI tournament, including an innings of 3 from 30 balls, lead to repeated calls for his omission, until he scored a 116 at the Adelaide Oval on Australia Day against India to lay the foundation for Australia's largest ever total on home soil of 5/329. Waugh ended the series with 305 runs at 30.50 and was retained for the tour of New Zealand, where he scored a respectable 206 runs at 41.20 in the abbreviated form of the game including two half-centuries. He then scored an unbeaten 72 in the first Test at Eden Park to set up a victory in a low-scoring game—only one other player passed 20. Waugh ended the series with 190 runs at 47.50 as Australia won 3–0. However, a run of seven ODIs during the 2000 Australian winter including two series against South Africa in which he tallied only 84 runs at 12.00 again saw further media speculation of impending demise.

=== Return to form ===
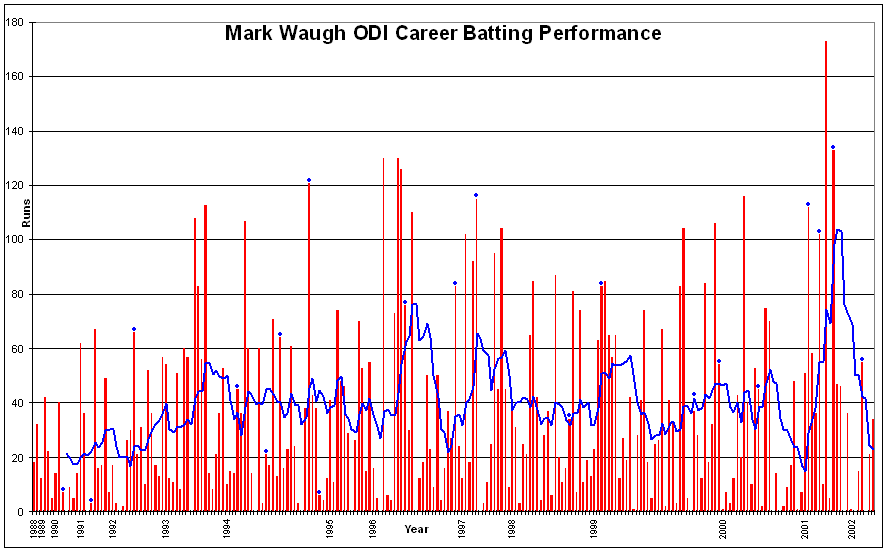
Waugh's ODI career batting performance. Note the spike near the end of his career due to the 2000–01 series.

After the being close to omission the previous season, Waugh made a good start to the 2000–01 season, scoring 119 against the West Indies in the second Test in Perth. He added two further half-centuries to total 339 runs at 48.4 as the Windies were defeated 5–0. His productive summer continued in the limited overs format when he went on to score an Australian ODI record of 173 in the second tri-series final against the West Indies at the Melbourne Cricket Ground. It was one of three ODI centuries he scored in that tournament, the others being a 112 and 102, both not out, against the West Indies and Zimbabwe respectively. In total he scored 540 runs in the series at an average of 108.00. As the leading runscorer by far in the tournament, he was expected to be named Player of the Series, resulting in widespread crowd jeering when it was instead awarded to Brian Lara. Waugh was also tipped to win the Allan Border Medal due to his prolific runscoring that year. However, despite leading the player votes with 32, the umpire and media thought otherwise, awarding Steve Waugh 37 votes to his 32, making Steve the winner 65–64.

The 2001 tour of India saw Australia's 16 Test winning streak come to an end when India claimed the series 2–1. Waugh scored 70 and 57 in the third Test in Chennai to finish with 149 runs at 29.80 in a difficult series. Waugh continued his fine ODI form with another century, an unbeaten 133 against India in the second ODI, but was forced to return home after his finger was fractured by a Javagal Srinath delivery.

=== Catching world record ===
During the 2001 Ashes series, Waugh topped the aggregates with 430 runs, scoring Test centuries at Lord's (108) and The Oval (120). He broke Mark Taylor's world record of 157 Test catches. Waugh was unable to maintain this form in the 2001–02 Australian summer: he totalled 269 (at 33.6) in six Tests against New Zealand and South Africa, without a century. Media scrutiny of his inability to combat short-pitched bowling increased and led to speculation about his long-term future in the team.

Nevertheless, he passed two major milestones: the Test at Adelaide marked the 100th Test in which both Waughs played, while the following game was his 100th consecutive Test match. Waugh and fellow ODI opener Adam Gilchrist both hit a batting slump during the VB series, with Waugh averaging 26 for the series and Gilchrist less. Frequent poor starts to the innings resulted in Australia's failure to qualify for the final of the tri-series for the first time in five years. Later in the year, the selectors reacted by dropping Steve and Mark Waugh, the oldest members of the team, in favour of younger players.

=== Final series ===
Maintaining his place in the Test team, Waugh toured South Africa in early 2002. Although he passed 15 in each of his innings, he managed only one half-century in his 169 runs at 33.8. In an attempt to regain form, he had a brief stint with Essex in the English County Championship. In the subsequent three-Test series against Pakistan, played on neutral grounds in Sri Lanka and the United Arab Emirates due to security reasons, he made only 80 runs at 20. Waugh retired from international cricket in late 2002 after being omitted for the upcoming Test series against England in favour of Darren Lehmann.

Waugh retired as Australia's highest run scorer and century maker (18) in ODI cricket, with these records having since been broken by Ricky Ponting. His world record of 181 Test catches was broken by India's Rahul Dravid in 2009.

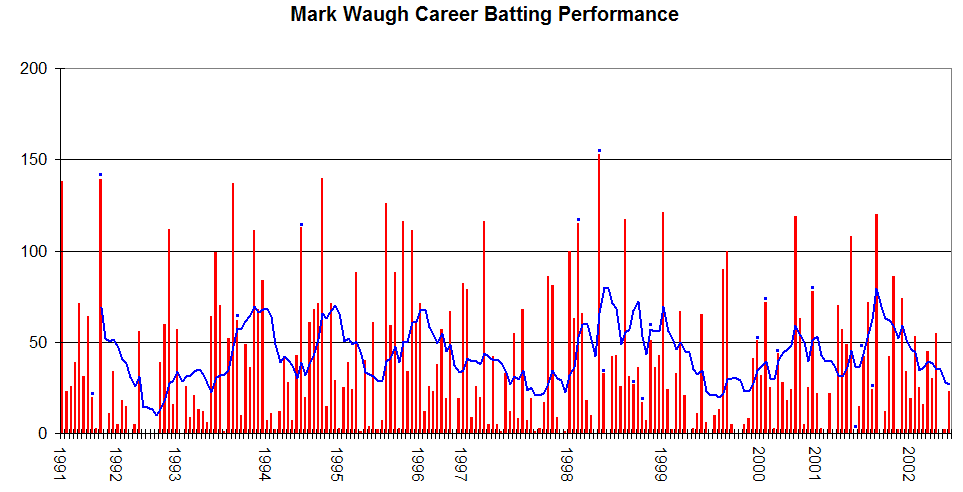
Mark Waugh's Test career batting performance graph.

== Fielding ==
Waugh took a record 181 catches in Test matches, the second highest for a non-wicketkeeper. He primarily fielded in the second slip position whilst a fast bowler was operating. He would field at silly point whilst a spin bowler was operating and then at first slip for a spinner following the retirement of Mark Taylor. Additionally, he would field at mid-wicket or short mid-wicket when he was not required in a close catching position and also during ODIs.

== Involvement with bookmakers ==
In 1993, Waugh was a member of the Australian team competing in the Hong Kong Sixes; one of the Indian team was Test all-rounder Manoj Prabhakar. A report by the Central Bureau of Investigation in 2000 implicated Prabhakar for acting as a conduit for bookmakers involved in illegal cricket betting, which resulted in Prabhakar receiving a five-year suspension from the game. The report also documented allegations by Indian bookmaker Mukesh Gupta that Prabhakar had introduced him to Waugh during the tournament and that Waugh was paid A$20,000 for insider information about the Australian team, pitch conditions and weather information.

When the allegations were made public by the report in November 2000, Waugh immediately pledged to co-operate with any inquiry. In January 2001, the International Cricket Council's anti-corruption unit and the ACB's special investigator Greg Melick requested an interview with Waugh, which his management "presently declined". Waugh received legal advice to seek further clarification of the scope of the investigation. After condemnation from the ACB and media, and the possibility of losing his contract with the ACB, Waugh agreed to the interview. He was cleared in August 2001.

During the Singer World Series tournament, played in Sri Lanka during September 1994, Waugh made a decision which came back to affect his career four years later. He was approached in Colombo by an Indian named "John", a bookmaker who asked him for general pitch and weather information as well as insider team information. In return, Waugh received US$4,000. The arrangement continued during the 1994–95 Australian summer, but he refused to divulge inside team information. Waugh introduced "John" to Shane Warne.

On the 1994 tour of Pakistan, Waugh claimed that along with Warne and Tim May, he was offered A$200,000 to underperform by Pakistan captain Saleem Malik. The offer was in regard to an ODI played in Rawalpindi on 22 October. Waugh says he rejected the bribe and went on to score 121* from 134 deliveries in the match. The trio signed a statement in early 1995 stating their claims, which were forwarded to the ICC. In October 1995, a Pakistan Cricket Board inquiry led by former Pakistan Supreme Court judge Fakhruddin G. Ebrahim ruled that the allegations, "are not worthy of any credence and must be rejected as unfounded". Further, he stated that they "appear to have been concocted".

However, during the 1998 tour of Pakistan, the issue was again raised, as the Government of Pakistan had initiated a separate judicial inquiry into general issues regarding the performance of the Pakistani team and allegations of illegal betting by past and former players. Waugh, along with his captain Mark Taylor and ACB CEO Malcolm Speed, were summoned to Lahore by PCB CEO Majid Khan to appear before an inquiry led by Justice Malik Mohammed Qayyum.

In December 1998, prior to the Adelaide Test match against England, news broke that Waugh and Warne were involved with "John" four years earlier and had been fined by the ACB. Both players were required to make public statements acknowledging that they had been, "naive and stupid" and reasserting that they were not involved in corruption. The players were widely condemned by the media and public, with Prime Minister of Australia John Howard stating that he felt an "intense feeling of disappointment". Former Test player Neil Harvey called for both players to be banned. In May 2000, the PCB banned Malik for life, after a recommendation from the Qayyum investigation, which concluded that Malik had attempted to bribe Waugh, Warne and May.

== After cricket ==
In 2002, Waugh did a brief stint as Nine Network cricket commentator during the 3-match Australia-Pakistan ODI series.

Waugh was previously a commentator on Network Ten for the Big Bash as well as a national selector. In 2018, Ten lost the rights to the Big Bash.

He was named as an opening batsman in Australia's "greatest ever ODI team." He was also inducted into the Australian Hall of Fame by CA in 2014.

In 2018–19, Waugh joined Adam Gilchrist as a cricket commentator for Fox Sports.

After separating from Sue Porter - his partner of 17 years in 2004 - he then married Sydney Cup-winning thoroughbred trainer Kim Waugh (née Moore) on 9 April 2005.

== International centuries ==
Waugh scored 38 international centuries - 20 in Test matches and 18 in ODIs.

== Bibliography ==
=== Contributor ===
- Waugh, Mark (2007). "Contributor". Laugh Even Louder!. By Camp Quality. Gosford, New South Wales: Scholastic Australia Pty Limited. ISBN 978-1-74169-022-4.

== Sources ==
- Knight, James (2003). Mark Waugh:the biography. HarperCollins. ISBN 0-7322-7493-1.
- Perry, Roland (2000). Captain Australia: A history of the celebrated captains of Australian Test cricket. Sydney: Random House Australia. ISBN 1-74051-174-3.
- Piesse, Ken (1999). The Taylor Years: Australian cricket 1994–99. Penguin Books Australia. ISBN 0-670-88829-X.
- Benaud, Richie (1991). Border & Co: A Tribute To Cricket's World Champions. Hamlyn Australia. ISBN 0-947334-31-9.
- Meher-Homji, Kersi (2000). Famous Cricketing Families: from Graces and Headleys to Chappells and Waughs. Kangaroo Press. ISBN 0-7318-0888-6.
