= Dean Waugh =

Australian cricketer

Personal information
- Full name: Dean Parma Waugh
- Born: 3 February 1969 (age 57); Campsie, New South Wales, Australia
- Batting: Right-handed
- Bowling: Right-arm off-break
- Role: Batsman
- Relatives: Mark Waugh (brother); Steve Waugh (brother); Tom Waugh (son)

Domestic team information
- Years: Team
- 1995/96–1996/97: New South Wales
- 1998/99: South Australia

Career statistics
| Competition | First-class | List A |
|---|---|---|
| Matches | 1 | 5 |
| Runs scored | 22 | 77 |
| Batting average | 11.00 | 15.40 |
| 100s/50s | 0/0 | 0/0 |
| Top score | 19 | 28 |
| Balls bowled | – | 6 |
| Wickets | – | 0 |
| Bowling average | – | – |
| 5 wickets in innings | – | – |
| 10 wickets in match | – | – |
| Best bowling | – | – |
| Catches/stumpings | 1/– | 2/– |
- Source: CricketArchive, 12 May 2019

Dean Parma Waugh (born 3 February 1969) is a former Australian first-class cricketer who played a match for New South Wales and also represented South Australia at list A level.

Although he only had a brief career in Australian domestic cricket, the right-handed batsman is noted for being the younger brother of players Mark and Steve Waugh.

His only first-class appearance came during the 1995–96 Sheffield Shield season when a Phil Emery led New South Wales, in the absence of their Test stars, took on Queensland at the Sydney Cricket Ground. The Queenslanders batted first and amassed 371, with Waugh taking a catch to dismiss their captain Allan Border off the bowling of Greg Matthews. Waugh batted at five in the batting order and made 19 before falling to Paul Jackson, caught behind. He was dismissed in the same fashion in his second dig, this time to Michael Kasprowicz for three, as New South Wales followed on and could only set Queensland a target of one run.

Also in the 1995–96 summer he took the field for New South Wales in two Mercantile Mutual Cup matches. After opening the batting and scoring 15 on his debut, Waugh moved back into the middle order when he was picked in the Semi Final side which played Western Australia. He made a rapid 28, off just 25 balls, before being run-out and then watched the Western Warriors chase down their score in the 47th over. The following season he played one other Mercantile Mutual one day match for New South Wales and then decided to make the move to South Australia.

Waugh could not break into the South Australian Sheffield Shield team but did take part in their 1998–99 Mercantile Mutual Cup campaign. The second of his two games - his last appearance in Australian domestic cricket, was another Semi Final loss. On this occasion it was Victoria who eliminated his team from the competition. After scoring 17 of South Australia's total of 175, he took a couple of catches during Victoria's pursuit of their target before the winning runs were hit with just nine balls to spare.
