= Kim Waugh =

Australian horse trainer

Kim Waugh (née Moore) is an Australian horse trainer, operating from Wyong Racecourse.

Her most notable achievement in Thoroughbred racing has been winning the 2005 Sydney Cup with the stayer Mahtoum.

She is married to former Australian cricketer, Mark Waugh.
