= Canterbury Hospital =

Hospital in New South Wales, Australia

- Sydney Local Health District

Geography
- Location: 575 Canterbury Road, Campsie, Sydney, NSW, Australia
- Coordinates: 33°55′11″S 151°05′54″E

Organisation
- Care system: Public Medicare (AU)
- Type: Teaching
- Affiliated university: The University of Sydney

Services
- Emergency department: Yes
- Beds: 217
- Speciality: Maternity, geriatrics, general medicine

History
- Opened: 1929

Links
- Website: Official Website
- Lists: Hospitals in Australia

The Canterbury Hospital is a teaching hospital in Campsie, a south-western suburb of Sydney, New South Wales, Australia.

Canterbury Hospital was opened in 1929 and was rebuilt in 1998.

Canterbury Hospital is one of many hospitals in a network under the management of Sydney Local Health District. Canterbury Hospital has links to Concord Repatriation General Hospital, Royal Prince Alfred Hospital and the University of Sydney, offering health services to residents in the Canterbury and Bankstown area of Sydney.

Canterbury Hospital and community health centre cater for a local population of 220,000 of which 66% come from non-English speaking backgrounds.

== Gallery ==
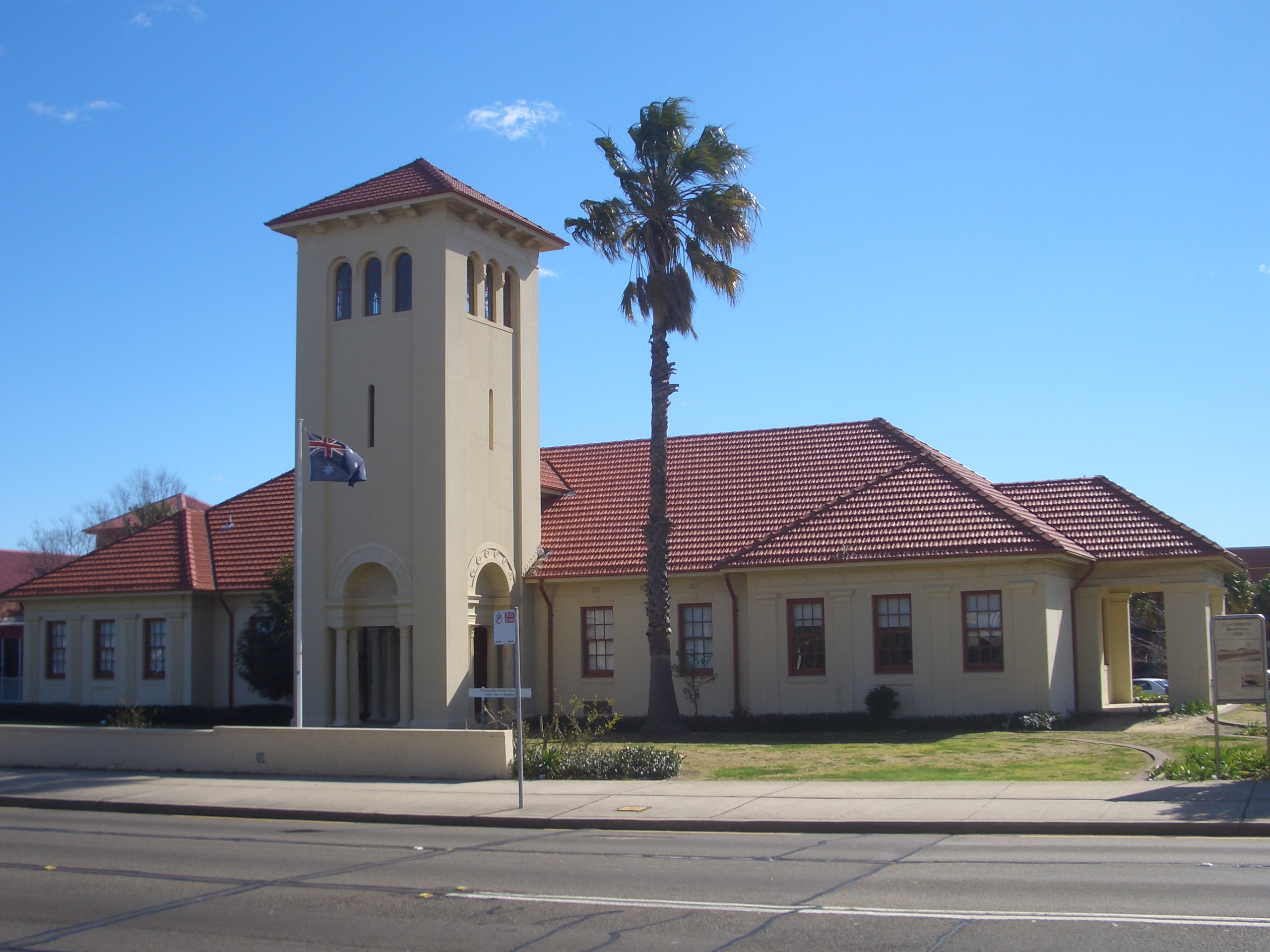
Old Canterbury Hospital building

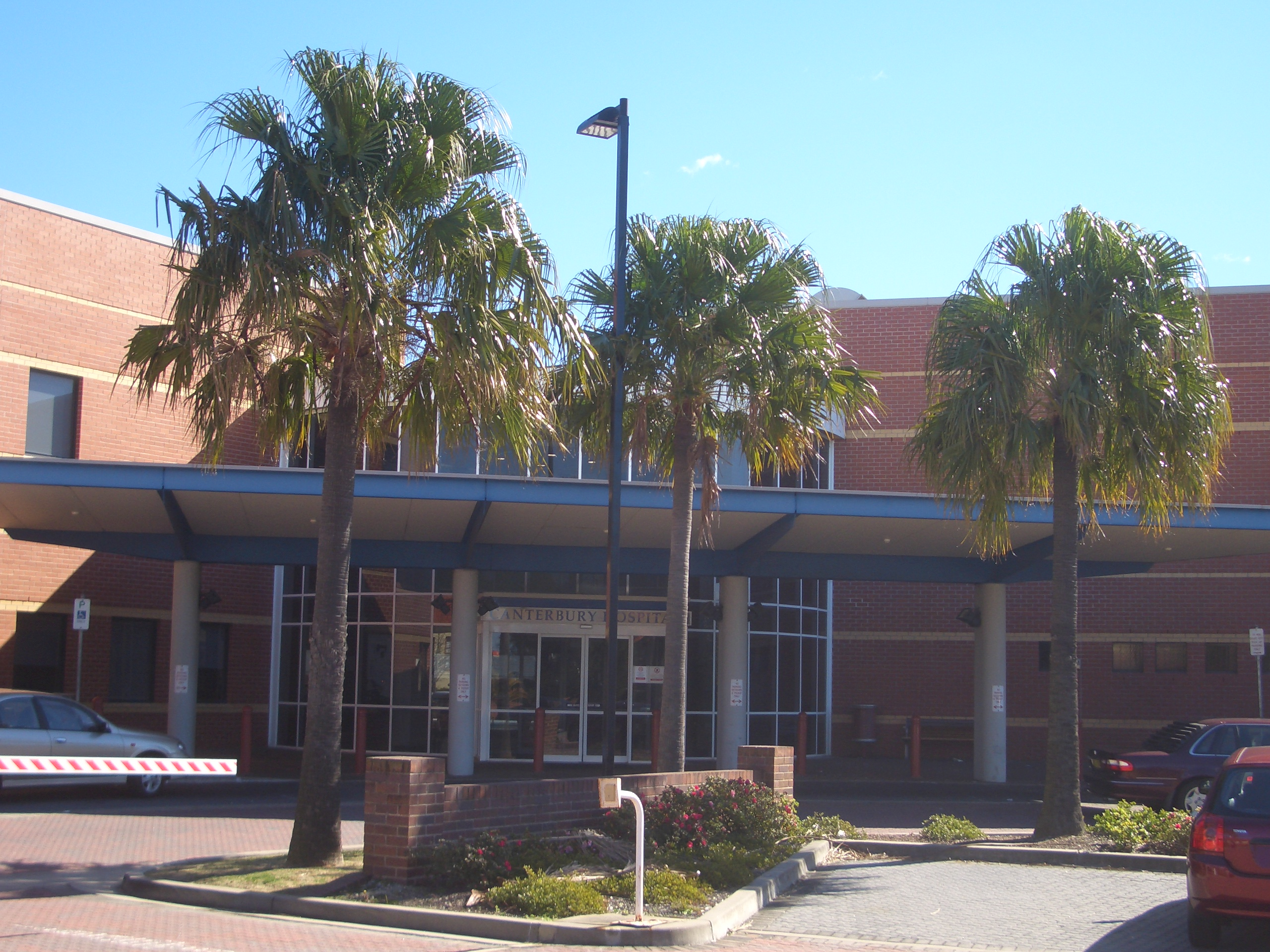
Canterbury Hospital entrance

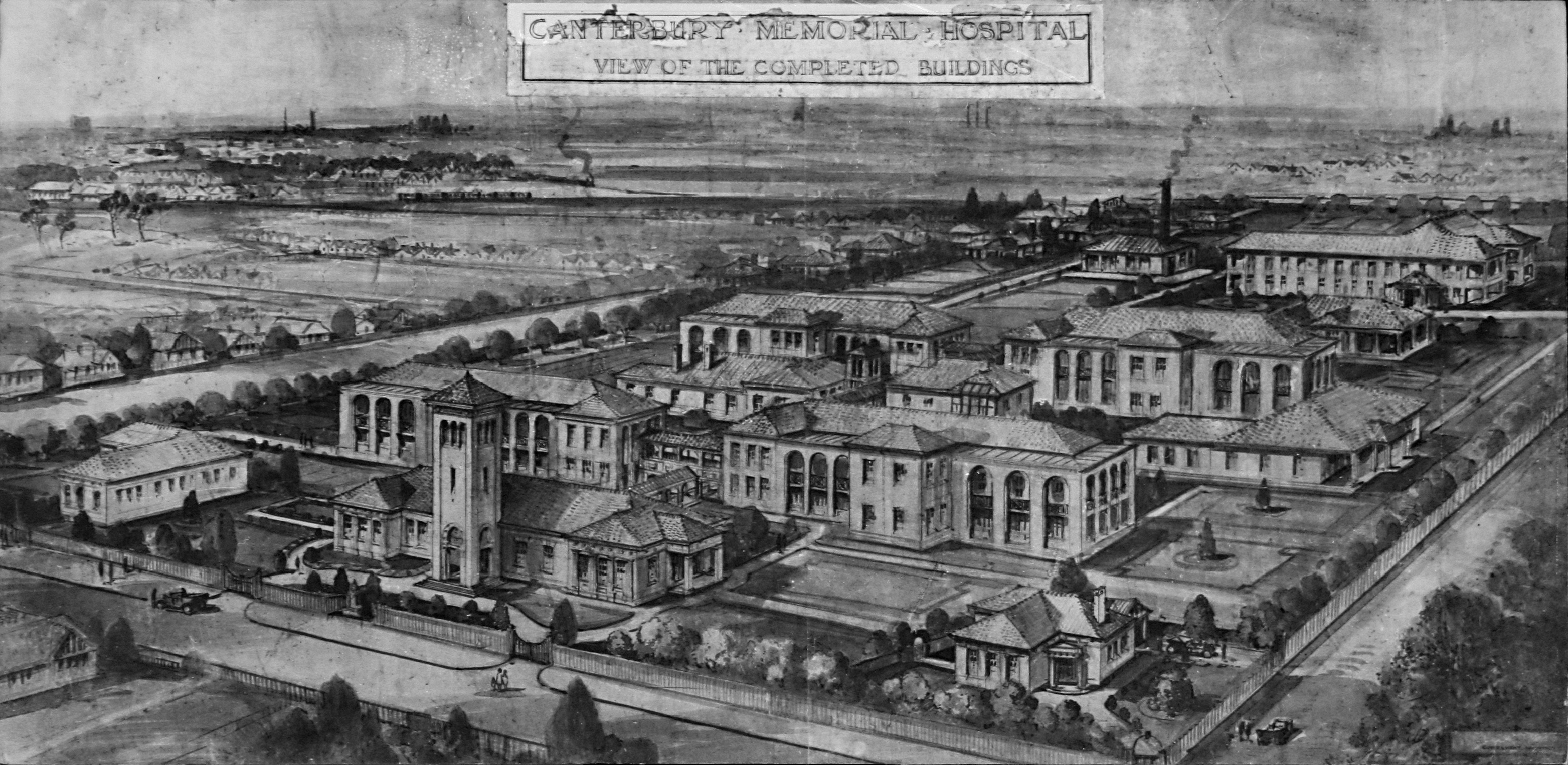
A black and white painting entitled Canterbury Memorial Hospital, by the Government Architect, whose signature is illegible.

== See also ==
- List of hospitals in Australia
