= India national cricket team =

Men's cricket team

India
- Nickname: Men in Blue
- Association: Board of Control for Cricket in India

Personnel
- Test captain: Shubman Gill
- One Day captain: Shubman Gill
- T20I captain: Shreyas Iyer
- Coach: Gautam Gambhir

History
- Test status acquired: 1932 (94 years ago)

International Cricket Council
- ICC status: Full Member (1926)
- ICC region: Asia
ICC Rankings	Current	Best-ever
Test	4th	1st (1973)
ODI	1st	1st (1994)
T20I	2nd	1st (2014)

Tests
- First Test: v England at Lord's, London; 25–28 June 1932
- Last Test: v Sri Lanka at Sinhalese Sports Club Cricket Ground, Colombo; 23–27 August 2026
Tests	Played	Won/Lost
Total	601	187/188 (225 draws, 1 tie)
This year	3	2/0 (1 draw)
- World Test Championship appearances: 3 (first in 2021)
- Best result: (silver) Runners-up (2021, 2023)

One Day Internationals
- First ODI: v England at Headingley, Leeds; 13 July 1974
- Last ODI: v New Zealand at Bay Oval, Mount Maunganui; 15 November 2026
ODIs	Played	Won/Lost
Total	1,089	580/454 (10 ties, 45 no results)
This year	17	10/6 (0 ties, 1 no results)
- World Cup appearances: 13 (first in 1975)
- Best result: (gold) Champions (1983, 2011)

T20 Internationals
- First T20I: v South Africa at Wanderers Stadium, Johannesburg; 1 December 2006
- Last T20I: v New Zealand at Seddon Park, Hamilton; 1 November 2026
T20Is	Played	Won/Lost
Total	303	201/85 (7 ties, 10 no results)
This year	40	26/12 (0 ties, 2 no result)
- T20 World Cup appearances: 10 (first in 2007)
- Best result: (gold) Champions (2007, 2024, 2026)
- Official website: bcci.tv
Test kit
ODI kit
T20I kit
- As of 15 November 2026

India national cricket teams
Women's (1976–present)	Men's (1926–present)	Women's U19 (2022–present)	Men's U19 (1979–present)	Blind Men's (2012–present)

The India men's national cricket team represents India in international cricket. It is governed by the Board of Control for Cricket in India (BCCI) and is a full member nation of the International Cricket Council with Test, One Day International (ODI) and Twenty20 International (T20I) status. India are the current holders of the T20 World Cup, the ICC Champions Trophy, the Asia Cup, and the Asian Games.

The team has played 601 Test matches, winning 187, losing 188, with 225 draws and 1 tie. India have played in two of the three World Test Championship finals, finishing runners-up twice in 2021 and 2023.

The team has played 1,089 ODI matches, winning 580, losing 454, tying 10, and with 45 ending in a no-result. India have played in the World Cup final four times and have won the title twice in 1983 and 2011. They have also won the Champions Trophy, a record three times in 2002^{s}, 2013, and 2025. India have also won the ODI Asia Cup for a record seven times.

The team has played 303 T20I matches, winning 201, losing 85, tying 7, and with 10 ending in a no-result. India have played in the T20 World Cup final four times and have won the title, a record three times in 2007, 2024, and 2026. India have also won the T20I Asia Cup for a record two times. They have also won the Asian Games for a record two times.

== History ==
=== Early history (1700s–1918) ===
The British first brought cricket to India in the early 1700s, with the first cricket match played in 1721. It was played and adopted by Kolis of Gujarat .The East India Company tried to manage the Kolis through cricket and were successful. In 1848, the Parsi community in Mumbai formed the Oriental Cricket Club, the first cricket club to be established by Indians. After slow beginnings, the Europeans eventually invited the Parsis to play a match in 1877. By 1912, the Parsis, Hindus, Sikhs and Muslims of Bombay played a quadrangular tournament with the Europeans every year. In the early 1900s, some Indians went on to play for the England cricket team. Some of these, such as Ranjitsinhji and Duleepsinhji were greatly appreciated by the British and their names went on to be used for the Ranji Trophy and Duleep Trophy – two major first-class tournaments in India. In 1911, an Indian men's cricket team, captained by Bhupinder Singh of Patiala, went on their first official tour of the British Isles, but only played English county teams and not the England cricket team.

=== Test match status (1918–1970) ===
India was invited to the International Cricket Council in 1926, and made their debut as a Test-playing nation in England in 1932, led by C. K. Nayudu, who was considered the best Indian batsman at the time. The one-off Test match between the two teams was played at Lord's in London. The team was not strong in their batting at this point and went on to lose by 158 runs. India hosted its first men's Test cricket series in 1933 when England toured India. The visitors won the three-Test series 2–0 with the matches held at Bombay (now Mumbai), Calcutta (now Kolkata) and Madras (now Chennai). The Indian team continued to improve throughout the 1930s and 1940s but did not achieve an international victory during this period. In the early 1940s, India did not play any men's Test cricket due to World War II. The team's first series as an independent country was in late 1947 against Don Bradman's Australia. It was also the first Test series India played which was not against England. Australia men's cricket team won the five-match series 4–0, with Bradman tormenting the Indian bowling in his final Australian summer. India subsequently played their first Test series at home not against England, but against the West Indies in 1948. West Indies won the five-Test series 1–0. India recorded their first Test victory, in their 24th match, against England at Madras in 1952. Later in the same year, they won their first Test series, which was against Pakistan. They continued their improvement throughout the early 1950s with a series win against New Zealand in 1956. However, they did not win again in the remainder of the decade and lost badly to strong Australian and English teams. On 24 August 1959, India lost by an innings in the Test to complete the only 5–0 whitewash ever inflicted by England. The next decade saw India's reputation develop as a team with a strong record at home. They won their first Test series against England at home in 1961–62 and also won a home series against New Zealand. They managed to draw home series against Pakistan and Australia and another series against England. In this same period, India also won its first series outside the subcontinent, against New Zealand in 1967–68.

The key to India's bowling in the 1970s were the Indian spin quartet – Bishan Singh Bedi, E. A. S. Prasanna, B. S. Chandrasekhar and Srinivasaraghavan Venkataraghavan. This period also saw the emergence of two of India's best ever batsmen, Sunil Gavaskar and Gundappa Viswanath. Indian pitches have had the tendency to support spin and the spin quartet exploited this to create collapses in opposing batting line-ups. These players were responsible for the back-to-back series wins in 1971 in the West Indies and in England, under the captaincy of Ajit Wadekar. Gavaskar scored 774 runs in the West Indian series while Dilip Sardesai's 112 played a big part in their one Test win.

=== One-day cricket and ICC Cricket World Cup success (1970–1985) ===
The advent of men's One Day International (ODI) cricket in 1971 created a new dimension in the cricket world. However, India was not considered strong in ODIs at this point and batsmen such as the captain Gavaskar were known for their defensive approach to batting. India began as a weak team in ODIs and did not qualify for the knockout stage in the first two editions of the Cricket World Cup. Gavaskar blocked his way to 36 not out of 174 balls against England in the inaugural 1975 Cricket World Cup; India scored just 132 for 3 and lost by 202 runs.

In contrast, India fielded a strong team in test matches and was particularly strong at home, where their combination of stylish batsmen and beguiling spinners were at their best. India set a then Test record in the third Test against the West Indies at Port-of-Spain in 1976, when they chased 403 to win, thanks to 112 from Viswanath. In November 1976, the team established another record by scoring 524 for 9 declared against New Zealand at Kanpur without any individual batsman scoring a century. There were six fifties, the highest being 70 by Mohinder Amarnath. This innings was only the eighth instance in Test cricket where all eleven batsmen reached double figures. India performed worse in the 1979 Cricket World Cup, failing to win a single match.

During the 1980s, India developed a more attack-minded batting line-up with stroke makers such as the wristy Mohammad Azharuddin, Krishnamachari Srikanth, Dilip Vengsarkar and all-rounders Kapil Dev and Ravi Shastri. On 25 June 1983, India won the 1983 Cricket World Cup, defeating the favourites and the two-time defending champions West Indies in the final at Lord's, owing to a strong bowling performance. Bowler Roger Binny was the leading wicket taker of the tournament with 18 scalps. In spite of this, the team performed poorly in the Test arena, including 28 consecutive Test matches without a victory. In 1984, India won the inaugural edition of the Asia Cup and in 1985, won the World Championship of Cricket in Australia.

=== Late 20th century (1985–1999) ===
Despite winning major tournaments in the first half of the 1980s, India remained a weak test team. India's Test series victory in 1986 against England remained the last Test series win by India outside the subcontinent for the next 19 years. The 1980s saw Gavaskar and Kapil Dev (India's best all-rounder to date) at the pinnacle of their careers. Gavaskar made a Test record 34 centuries as he became the first man to reach the 10,000 run mark. Kapil Dev later became the highest wicket-taker in Test cricket with 434 wickets. The period was also marked by an unstable leadership, with Gavaskar and Kapil exchanging the captaincy several times. India co-hosted the 1987 Cricket World Cup, the first instance when the tournament was hosted outside England. In the semi-finals, India was defeated by England, after having defeated them on the same stage four years prior.

The addition of Sachin Tendulkar and Anil Kumble to the national team in 1989 and 1990 further improved the team. The following year, Javagal Srinath, India's fastest bowler since Amar Singh made his debut. Under Azharuddin, India played in the 1992 Cricket World Cup, failing to make the knockout stage in the tournament for the first time since 1979. During the 1990s, India did not win any of its 33 Tests outside the subcontinent while it won 17 out of its 30 Tests at home. Notably, India won a hat-trick of Asia Cups in 1988, 1991 and 1995.

India was eliminated by neighbours Sri Lanka on home soil at the disastrous 1996 Cricket World Cup semi-final, where rioters burnt section of the stadium at Kolkata after India were set to face a crushing defeat. Tendulkar was the tournament's leading run scorer, with this the first time an Indian being one in the tournament; and Kumble leading the wicket-taking charts. Following the World Cup, the team underwent a year of change as Sourav Ganguly and Rahul Dravid, later to become captains of the team, made their debut in the same test at Lord's. Tendulkar replaced Azharuddin as captain in late 1996, but after a personal and team form slump, Tendulkar relinquished the captaincy and Azharuddin was reinstated at the beginning of 1998. India lost the final of the 1997 Asia Cup, losing the tournament for the first time in editions they had participated in. In order to play a bilateral ODI series against Pakistan, India split its squad into two and sent a weak squad to feature in the cricket tournament of the 1998 Commonwealth Games. As a result, India failed to progress from the group stage. In the inaugural edition of the Champions Trophy in 1998, India were knocked out in the semi-finals by West Indies.

The team had yet another disastrous World Cup in 1999. Despite Dravid being the tournament's leading run scorer, India failed to reach the knockouts. Following this, Tendulkar was again made captain, and had another poor run, losing 3–0 on a tour of Australia and then 2–0 at home to South Africa. Tendulkar resigned, vowing never to captain the team again.

=== Captaincy changes and dominance on global stage (2000–2013) ===
The team was further damaged in 2000 when former captain Azharuddin and fellow batsman Ajay Jadeja were implicated in a match-fixing scandal and given life and five-year bans respectively. This period was described by the BBC as "the Indian cricket's worst hour". However, the new core – Tendulkar, Dravid, Kumble and Ganguly – swore not to let this happen to them again, and led Indian cricket out of the dark times. The first three put aside personal ambitions to let Ganguly lead them into a new era.

The Indian team underwent major improvements under the captaincy of Ganguly and the guidance of John Wright, India's first foreign coach. Ganguly led India to the final of the 2000 Champions Trophy, India's first ICC final after the 1983 World Cup. Despite his century, India was defeated in the final by New Zealand. He was the leading run scorer in the tournament, and Venkatesh Prasad the leading wicket taker. In the Kolkata Test match, India became only the third team in the history of Test cricket to win a Test match after following on. Australian captain Steve Waugh labelled India as the "Final Frontier" because of his team's inability to win a Test series in India. In 2002, India took part in the 2002 NatWest Series against England and Sri Lanka, where after topping the table they faced hosts England in the final. India ended up chasing 326 to win what is widely regarded as one of the greatest ODI matches of all time, winning the series. On 30 September 2002, India and Sri Lanka were crowned undefeated joint-winners of the 2002 Champions Trophy after the final was rained off following 2 days of play. This was India's first ICC title after the 1983 World Cup, and India and Sri Lanka became the only countries to have won both the tournaments. Virender Sehwag was the tournament's leading run scorer.

India then went to the 2003 Cricket World Cup in South Africa, where they reached the final, India's third consecutive ICC final, only to be beaten by Australia. Tendulkar, the player of the tournament, set the record for the most runs scored in a single world cup. A convincing ODI series win in Pakistan in early 2006, following a loss in the Test series, gave India the world record of 17 successive ODI victories while batting second. India had poor performances at the Champions Trophies in 2004 and 2006, and most notably at the 2007 Cricket World Cup under Dravid's leadership which led to significant changes in the team's structure. India found a new core in players like MS Dhoni, Yuvraj Singh, Harbhajan Singh and Zaheer Khan.

In 2007, Dhoni was made captain in limited-overs. On 24 September 2007, India won the inaugural edition of the Men's T20 World Cup held in South Africa, beating Pakistan by five runs in the final. This victory was a dominant factor in the introduction of the Indian Premier League. Despite this, India failed to reach the knockout stages of the 2009 Champions Trophy and the 2009 and 2010 editions of the T20 World Cup.

India won the 2010 Asia Cup, winning the tournament for the first time in fifteen years. Tendulkar became the first cricketer to score 200 in ODIs. On 2 April 2011, India won the 2011 Cricket World Cup by defeating Sri Lanka in the final, thus becoming the third team after West Indies and Australia to win the World Cup twice. India also became the first team to win the World Cup on home soil. This was Tendulkar's last of six world cups, having equalled Javed Miandads record of having played in the most editions of the tournament. Zaheer Khan was the joint-highest wicket taker of the tournament. Sehwag, Yuvraj and Harbhajan became the first set of players to win all three ICC white-ball tournaments. Later that year, Sehwag broke Tendulkar's record of having the highest individual score in ODIs. The following year, the team failed to reach the knockouts for the 2012 T20 World Cup, for the third time in a row.

On 19 June 2013, India won the 2013 Champions Trophy undefeated after overcoming England in the rain-affected final and Dhoni became the first captain in history to win all three ICC trophies in white-ball cricket, namely the Cricket World Cup, T20 World Cup and Champions Trophy. Player of the tournament Shikhar Dhawan was the leading run scorer, and won the 'golden bat'. Ravindra Jadeja won the 'golden ball' for being the highest wicket-taker.

=== ICC tournament drought (2014–2023) ===
In the 2014 T20 World Cup hosted in Bangladesh, India narrowly missed out on another ICC trophy by losing to Sri Lanka in the final. Player of the tournament Kohli was the leading run scorer, having set the record for most runs scored in a single edition of the tournament (319). In late 2014, Dhoni stepped down as captain in tests to focus on white-ball cricket, paving way for Kohli, the vice-captain, to succeed him. In a match against Sri Lanka, Rohit overtook Sehwag to become the leading run-scorer in an inning in ODIs (264), being the first player to cross 250.

India was knocked out of the 2015 Cricket World Cup in the semi-final to eventual winners Australia. With the inclusion of pacer Jasprit Bumrah and all-rounder Hardik Pandya in the squad, India began 2016 by winning the 2016 Asia Cup, remaining unbeaten throughout the tournament. The team were favourites to win the 2016 T20 World Cup, which was being held at home, but lost in the semi-final to eventual champions West Indies. Kohli became the first player to be player of the tournament in back to back editions of a major cricket tournament.

After Dhoni stepped down from white-ball captaincy, Kohli stepped in as full-time captain across formats. India lost to arch rivals Pakistan in the final of the 2017 Champions Trophy by 180 runs, the worst defeat in the final of an ICC ODI tournament. Dhawan again won the 'golden bat' after being the leading run scorer, becoming the first to win the award twice.

In 2018, India won a test series in Australia for the first time in their history, under Kohli and coach Shastri. After winning the 2018 Asia Cup and the 2018 Nidahas Trophy, the team's next major global tournament was the 2019 Cricket World Cup where they made the semi-finals but lost to New Zealand by 18 runs. After Dhoni's retirement, KL Rahul took over as wicket-keeper and became a team regular. Vice-captain Rohit was the highest run-scorer of the tournament with 648 runs, and set the record for most centuries scored in a tournament (5). Following being dismissed for 36 in a test against Australia, India managed to turn-around and again win a series in Australia for the second time.

India played the first ever final of the World Test Championship in 2021 against New Zealand in which they lost by eight wickets. The team had a disappointing performance at the 2021 T20 World Cup, failing to reach the knockout stage of an ICC tournament for the first time since 2012 and also notably losing to rivals Pakistan by 10 wickets, their first defeat against the team in a World Cup match. After this tournament, Kohli was sacked as captain, being succeeded by Rohit across formats; and Dravid replacing Shastri as coach. They qualified for the semi-finals in the 2022 T20 World Cup, but lost to England by ten wickets. India played the final of the 2023 World Test Championship against Australia in which they lost by 209 runs. Following these losses, Rohit notably mentioned to Dinesh Karthik that "something needed to change", and he changed to having a more aggressive batting style as well as directing a more targeting batting approach in the team.

India went on to win the 2023 Asia Cup by notably dismissing Sri Lanka for 50 runs in the final and winning by ten wickets. India also secured the gold medal at the 2022 Asian games held in 2023 due to higher seeding after the final against Afghanistan was washed out. They were deemed favourites to win the home 2023 Cricket World Cup. Rohit broke Tendulkar's record of the most World Cup centuries in the match against Afghanistan. Tendulkar conceded more records to Kohli, who overtook him to score the most centuries in ODI cricket; as well as for scoring the most runs in a single edition of the tournament (765). India was ultimately defeated in the final by Australia. Shami was the leading wicket taker of the tournament.

=== Resurgence (2024–present) ===
In January, India played the longest-ever T20I in a match against Afghanistan, which got extended to two rounds of super overs in an eventual Indian triumph. On 29 June 2024, India won the 2024 T20 World Cup by defeating South Africa in the final. Hence, they became the third team after England and West Indies to win the cup twice and also the first team to win the tournament undefeated. Arshdeep Singh was the joint-highest wicket taker at 17 wickets, while Jasprit Bumrah became the player of the tournament. This was Rohit's last of nine T20 World Cups, having participated in every edition up until 2024 alongside Shakib al Hasan of Bangladesh. On 9 March 2025, India won the 2025 Champions Trophy undefeated. The team defeated New Zealand in the final, defeating them for the first time at this stage in an ICC tournament. This was India's third consecutive final of the tournament, as well as fourth consecutive ICC final. India became the first team to win the tournament thrice, with Rohit and Kohli being the only Indians to win four ICC tournaments.

Despite the successes in ODIs and T20Is, India had a poor season of test cricket in 2024. Following the series win against England and Bangladesh, India lost 3–0 to New Zealand in a home series, followed by failing to win a hat-trick of a test series in Australia. Due to these losses, India missed out on qualifying for the 2025 World Test Championship final, although the team was in a comfortable position to qualify prior to the 2 series, thereby failing to reach the final for the first time.

In the 2025 Anderson–Tendulkar Trophy, India drew the 5 match test series 2–2 with England. Later in the year, India comfortably won 2–0 at home against the West Indies, and then lost 0–2 at home against South Africa.

In the 2026 Men's T20 World Cup, India defeated New Zealand in the final, thus becoming the only team to win back-to-back T20 World Cups (2024 and 2026), and a record three titles in the T20 World Cup. Jasprit Bumrah and Varun Chakravarthy were the joint-highest wicket takers at 14 wickets each. Sanju Samson was named the Player of the Tournament, after becoming just the third player to score half-centuries in both the semi-final and the final of the same World Cup edition.

On 24 October 2026, India played its 300th T20I.

== Gallery ==
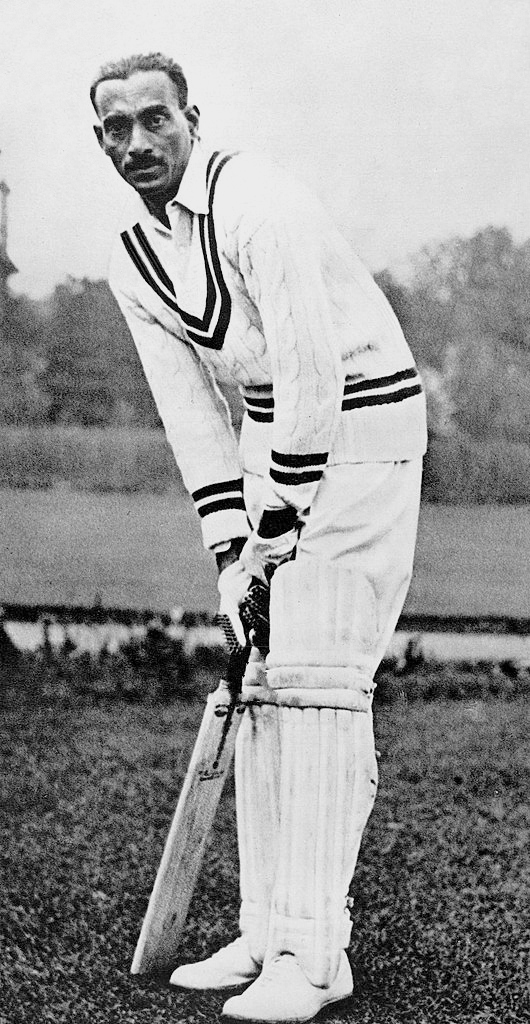
C. K. Nayudu, India's first Test cricket captain

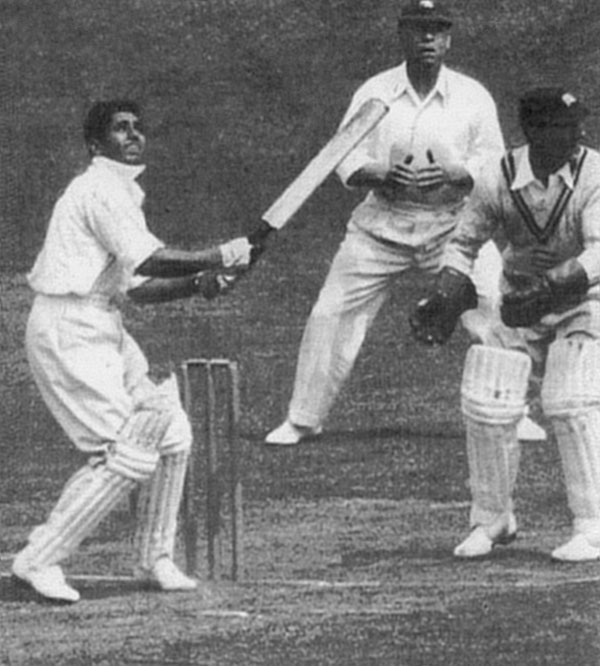
Lala Amarnath batting during a match against Middlesex at Lord's, c. 1936

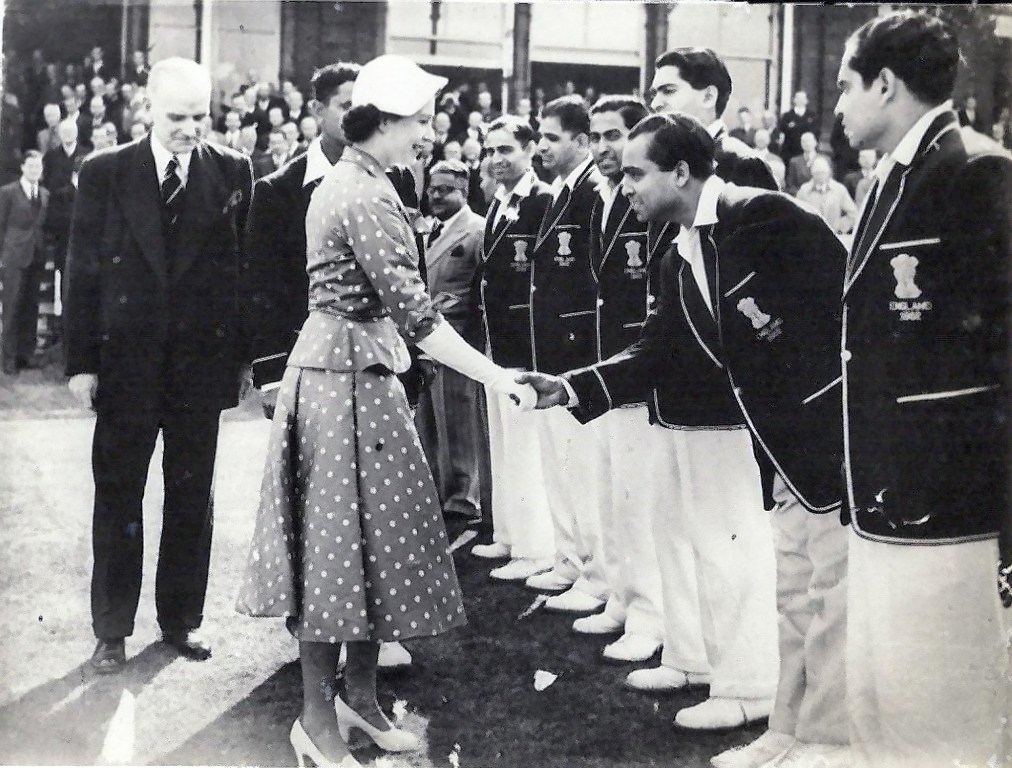
Elizabeth II with members of the Indian cricket team during their tour of England in 1952

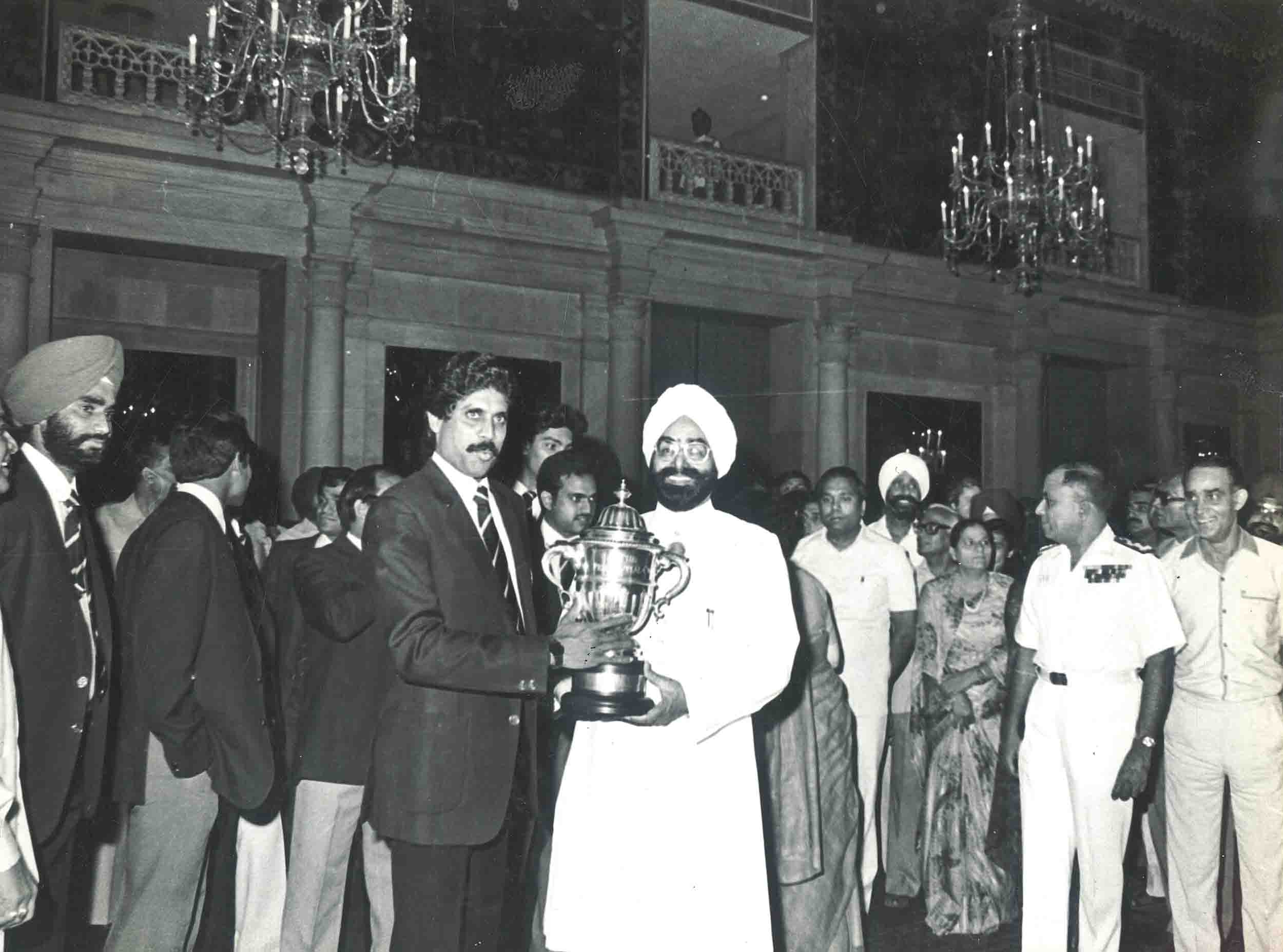
Kapil Dev with then Indian President Zail Singh after the team's return to India post winning the 1983 World Cup. They are holding the Cricket World Cup Trophy

Graph showing India's Test match results against all Test match teams from 1932 to September 2006

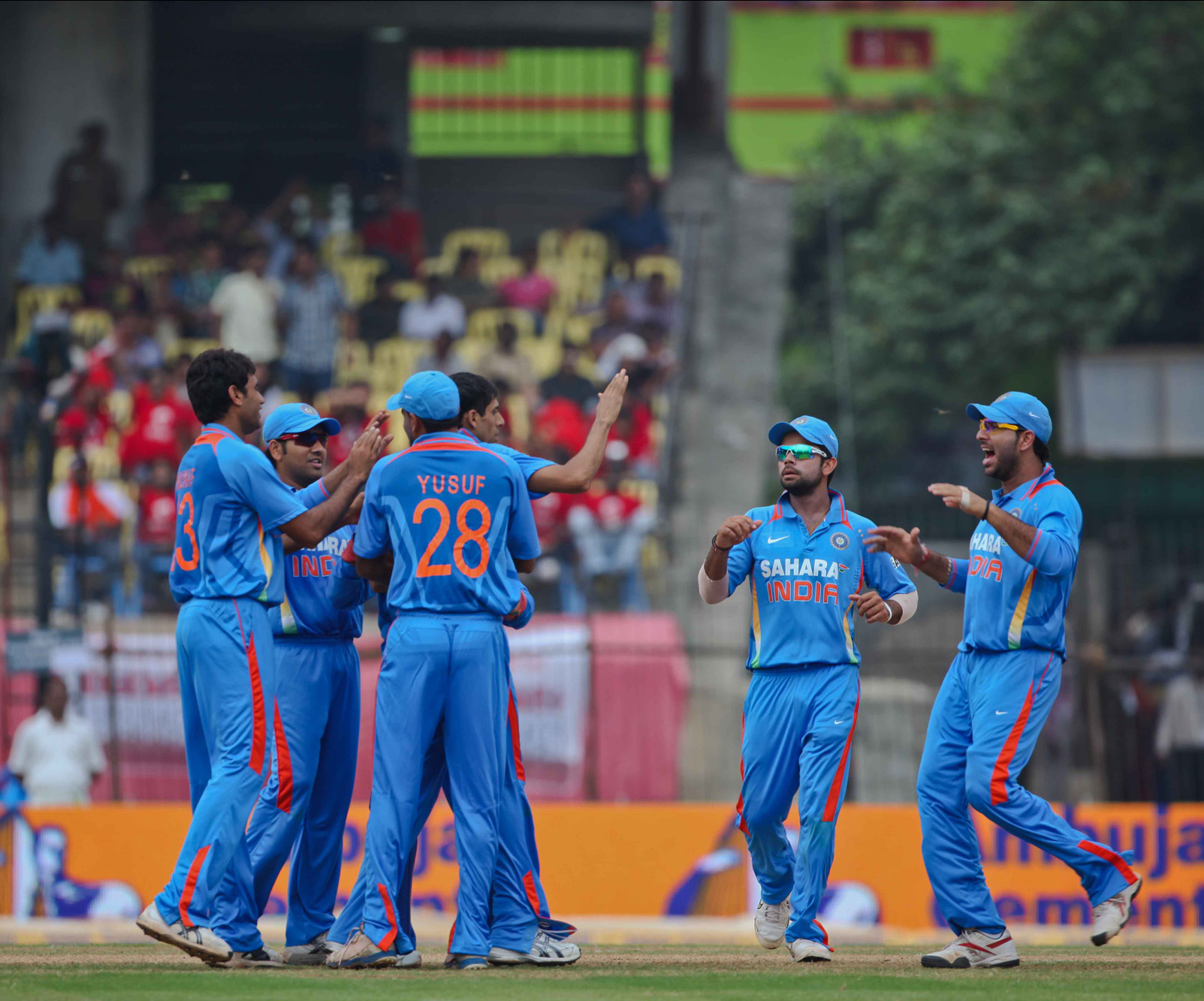
Indian players celebrating after taking a wicket against New Zealand in 2010

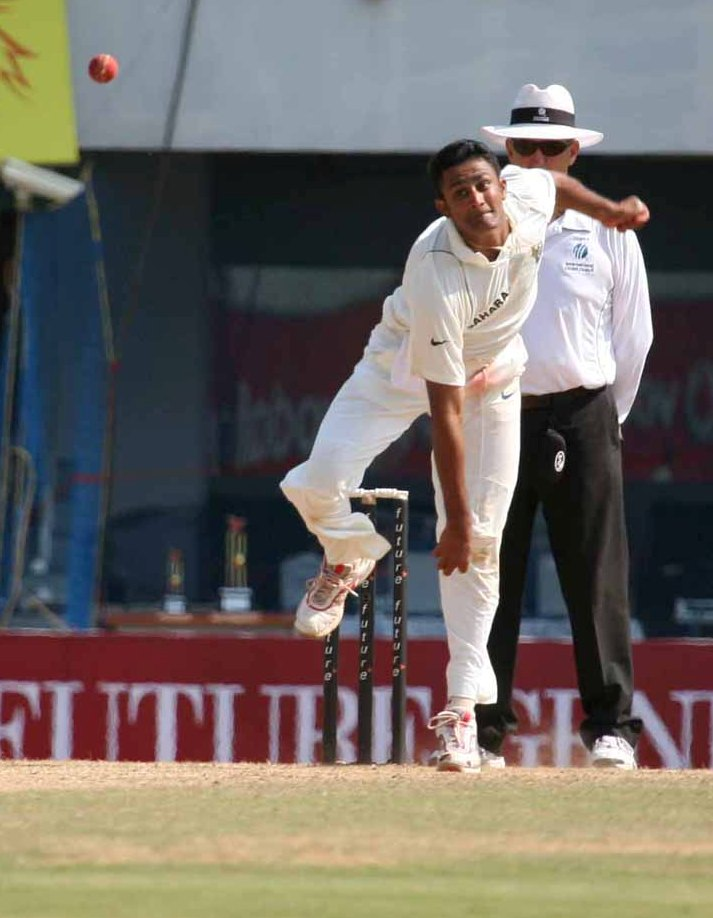
With 619 wickets, Anil Kumble is the world's fourth highest wicket-taker in Tests and India's highest Test and ODI wicket-taker

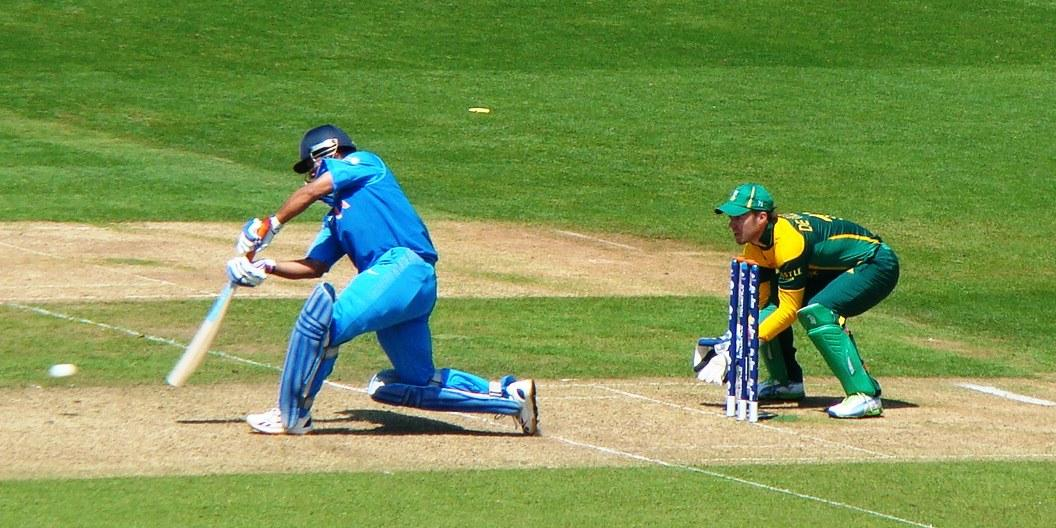
MS Dhoni batting against South Africa during the group stage match of 2013 ICC Champions Trophy

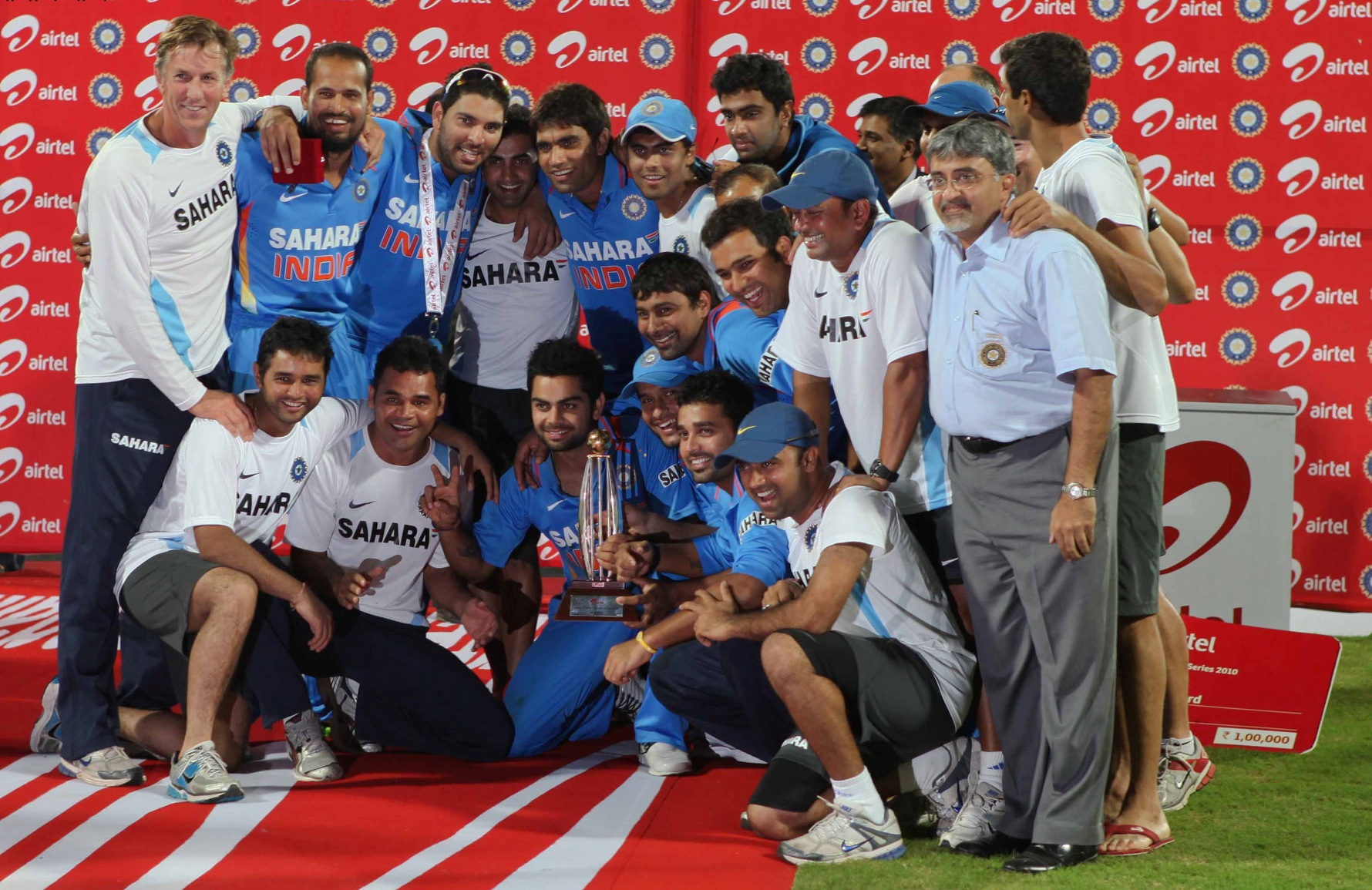
The Indian national cricket team posing with a cup after a series win

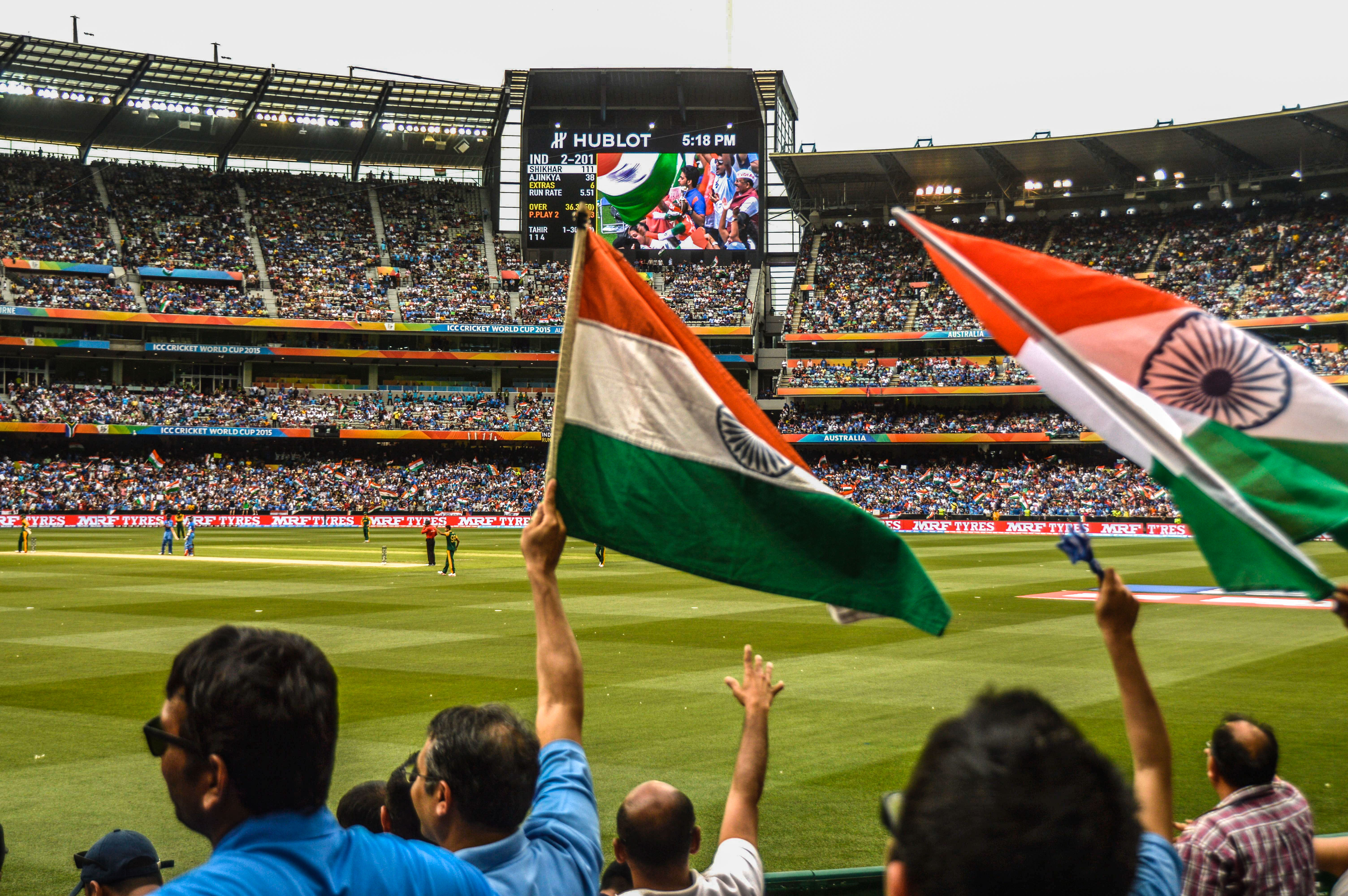
The Indian national cricket team in action during the 2015 Cricket World Cup at the Melbourne Cricket Ground

Rohit Sharma batting against Australia during the 2023 Cricket World Cup final at the Narendra Modi Stadium

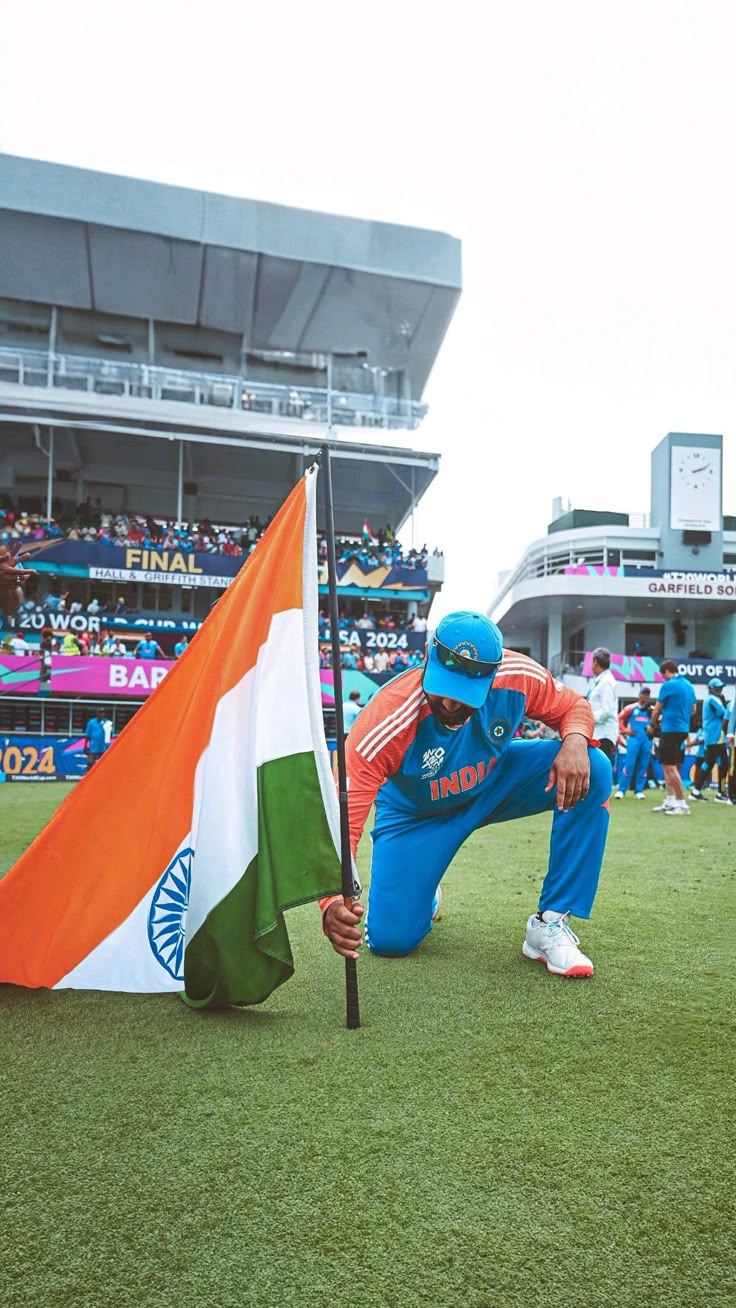
Rohit Sharma hoists the Indian flag at Kensington Oval, Barbados after winning 2024 Men's T20 World Cup final

== Governing body ==
The Board of Control for Cricket in India (BCCI) is the governing body for the Indian cricket team and first-class cricket in India. The Board has been operating since 1929 and represents India at the International Cricket Council (ICC). Its headquarters is situated in the 'Cricket centre' at Churchgate in Mumbai, Maharashtra. Amongst the richest sporting organisations in the world, it sold media rights for India's matches from 2006 to 2010 for $612,000,000. Mithun Manhas is present BCCI president and Devajit Saikia is secretary.

The International Cricket Council determines India's upcoming matches through its future tours program. However, the BCCI, with its influential financial position in the cricketing world, has often challenged the ICC's program and called for more series between India, Australia and England which are more likely to earn more revenue as opposed to tours with Bangladesh or Zimbabwe. In the past, the BCCI has also come into conflict with the ICC regarding sponsorships.

=== Selection committee ===
Selection for the Indian cricket team occurs through the BCCI's zonal selection policy, where each of the five zones is represented by one selector and one of the members nominated by BCCI as the chairman of the selection committee. This has sometimes led to controversy as to whether these selectors are biased towards their zones.

Until 18 November 2022, Chetan Sharma was the chief selector and Debashish Mohanty, Harvinder Singh and Sunil Joshi were members. The entire panel was sacked after the unsuccessful performance of the team in 2022 ICC Men's T20 World Cup. On 7 January 2023, Sharma was again appointed as the chief selector along with Shiv Sunder Das, Subroto Banerjee, Salil Ankola, and Sridharan Sharath. On 17 February 2023, Sharma resigned from his post after a sting operation by a private news channel saw him make several loose comments on the Indian team with Shiv Sunder Das replacing him and acting as an interim chief selector. On 4 July 2023, Ajit Agarkar was appointed as the new chief selector and replaced Sharma. He joined Das, Banerjee, Ankola and Sharath on the selection committee.

== Team colours ==
India plays its Test cricket matches with the traditional cricket whites with navy blue caps and helmets. The uniforms worn in limited-overs matches have different shades of blue for ODIs and T20Is, sometimes with a splash of the colours that are present in the Indian flag.

During the 1992 and 1999 Cricket World Cups, the Indian team's kit was sponsored by ISC and Asics respectively, but was without an official kit sponsor until 2001. With no official kit sponsor for the Indian team, Omtex manufactured the shirts and pants for the team, while some players chose to wear pants provided to them by their individual sponsors like Adidas and Reebok until December 2005. In December 2005, Nike outbid its competitors Adidas and Reebok, and acquired the contract for five years which started in January 2006 ahead of Indian team's tour to Pakistan. Nike was a long time kit supplier to team India with two extensions for a period of five years each time; in 2011 and 2016 respectively.

After Nike ended its contract in September 2020, MPL Sports Apparel & Accessories, a subsidiary of online gaming platform Mobile Premier League replaced Nike as the kit manufacturer in November 2020 ahead of Indian team's tour to Australia, which was supposed to run until December 2023.

In November 2022, MPL Sports decided to exit the deal before the end of their contract and hand over their rights to Kewal Kiran Clothing Limited (KKCL). In January 2023, MPL appointed Kewal Kiran Clothing Limited (KKCL) and Killer Jeans (a brand owned by KKCL) as interim sponsors until May 2023. In February 2023, it was announced that Adidas will begin a five-year sponsorship deal in June 2023 ahead of ICC World Test Championship final, replacing KKCL. In May 2023, BCCI officially announced Adidas as their kit sponsor for the next five years running until March 2028.

Period	Kit manufacturer	Shirt sponsor
1992	ISC	–
1999	Asics	ITC Limited (Wills & ITC Hotels)
1993–2001		ITC Limited (Wills & ITC Hotels)
2001–2005	Omtex	Sahara
2006–2013	Nike	Sahara
2014–2017	Nike	Star India
2017–2019	Nike	Oppo
2019–2020	Nike	Byju's
2020–2022	MPL Sports	Byju's
2023	Killer Jeans	Byju's
2023–2025	Adidas	Dream11
2025–present	Adidas	Apollo Tyres

Sponsorship for ICC Tournaments
Tournament	Kit Manufacturer	Sleeve Sponsor
1975 Cricket World Cup	–	–
1979 Cricket World Cup	–	–
1983 Cricket World Cup	–	–
1987 Cricket World Cup	–	–
1992 Cricket World Cup	ISC	–
1996 Cricket World Cup		Wills
1998 Champions Trophy		Wills
1999 Cricket World Cup	Asics	Wills
2000 Champions Trophy		Wills
2002 Champions Trophy	Omtex	
2003 Cricket World Cup	Omtex	Aamby Valley
2004 Champions Trophy	Omtex	Sahara
2006 Champions Trophy	Nike	Sahara
2007 Cricket World Cup	Nike	Sahara
2007 T20 World Cup	Nike	Sahara
2009 T20 World Cup	Nike	Sahara
2009 Champions Trophy	Nike	Sahara
2010 T20 World Cup	Nike	Sahara
2011 Cricket World Cup	Nike	Sahara
2012 T20 World Cup	Nike	Sahara
2013 Champions Trophy	Nike	Sahara
2014 T20 World Cup	Nike	Star India
2015 Cricket World Cup	Nike	Star India
2016 T20 World Cup	Nike	Star India
2017 Champions Trophy	Nike	Oppo
2019 Cricket World Cup	Nike	Oppo
2021 World Test Championship final	MPL Sports	Byju's
2021 T20 World Cup	MPL Sports	Byju's
2022 T20 World Cup	MPL Sports	Byju's
2023 World Test Championship final	Adidas	
2023 Cricket World Cup	Adidas	Dream11
2024 T20 World Cup	Adidas	Dream11
2025 Champions Trophy	Adidas	Dream11
2026 T20 World Cup	Adidas	Apollo Tyres

== Sponsorship ==
Current Sponsors & Partners
Team sponsor	Apollo Tyres
Kit sponsor	Adidas
Official partner(s)	SBI Life; Campa; ChatGPT Asian Paints
Official broadcaster	JioStar

=== Team sponsorship ===
Apollo Tyres is the new official sponsor of Indian cricket team from 16 September 2025. Apollo Tyres first international mileage was in the two-match home Test series against the West Indies, which begun on October 2. Sponsorship period is set to run until 2027. Dream11 (Sporta Technologies Pvt. Ltd.) was announced as the sponsor for the team on 1 July 2023. Their sponsorship was supposed to run until 31 March 2026 for a period of three years, but ended prematurely in August 2025, when Dream11 pulled out following the passage of the Online Gaming Act. Previously, Byju's was the sponsor for the Indian team from 5 September 2019 until 31 March 2023, after Oppo handed over the rights to them. Oppo's sponsorship was supposed to run from 2017 until 2022, but they handed over to Byju's. On 7 March 2022, Byju's extended its sponsorship for one year. Previously, the Indian team has been sponsored by Byju's from September 2019 until March 2023, Oppo from May 2017 until August 2019, Star India from January 2014 until March 2017, Sahara India Pariwar from June 2001 until December 2013 and ITC Limited (with Wills and ITC Hotels brands) from June 1993 until May 2001.

=== Official partners ===
On 9 January 2024, BCCI announced Campa and Atomberg Technologies as official partners for its domestic & international season during 2024–26. On 20 September 2023, BCCI announced SBI Life as the official partner for its domestic & international season during 2023–26. In August 2023, IDFC First Bank replaced Mastercard as the current title sponsor for all international and domestic matches played in India for the 2023–26 season. The title sponsorship was initially given to Paytm for all matches played between 2015 and 2023 but they handed over to Mastercard in 2022. On 30 August 2019, following the conclusion of the expression of interest process for official partners' rights, the BCCI announced that Sporta Technologies Pvt. Ltd. (Dream11), LafargeHolcim (ACC Cements, Ambuja Cements) and Hyundai India have acquired the official partners' rights for the BCCI International and Domestic matches during 2019–2023. Disney Star and Airtel have been title sponsors previously. Muthoot Fincorp is the current title sponsor of Indian national cricket team. It has held this position since 25 September 2026, after IDFC First Bank's contract ended in August 2026.

=== Official broadcasters ===
JioStar is the official broadcaster until March 2028 for all the men's international and domestic matches played in India. Star Sports telecasts the international and domestic matches on TV, while it is live streamed on JioHotstar as OTT (over the top) platform.

== International grounds ==
There are numerous world-renowned cricket stadiums located in India. Most grounds are under the administration of various state cricket boards as opposed to being under the control of the BCCI. The Bombay Gymkhana Ground was the first ground in India to host a full-scale cricket match featuring an Indian cricket team. This was between the Parsis and the Europeans in 1877. The first stadium to host a Test match in India was also the Gymkhana Ground in Mumbai in 1933, the only Test it ever hosted. The second and third Tests in the 1933 series were hosted at the Eden Gardens in Kolkata and the Chepauk in Chennai. The Arun Jaitley Cricket Stadium in Delhi was the first stadium to host a Test match after independence, a draw against the West Indies in 1948, the first of a five-Test series. There are 21 stadiums in India that have hosted at least one official Test match. In recent years, there has been an increase in the number of world-class cricket stadiums in India.

India currently has the world's largest cricket stadium (which is also the world's largest stadium), The Narendra Modi Stadium, located in Ahmedabad, Gujarat, India. It is currently recognised as one of the world's premier cricket venues and has hosted several high-profile matches. Eden Gardens has hosted the most Tests, and also has the third-largest seating capacity of any cricket stadium in the world. Founded in 1864, it is one of the most historical stadiums in India, having hosted numerous historical matches. Other major stadiums in India include the Arun Jaitley Cricket Stadium, which was established in 1883 and hosted memorable matches including Anil Kumble's ten wickets in an innings haul against Pakistan.

The Bombay Gymkhana Ground hosted the first Test match in India which is the only Test it has hosted to date. Wankhede Stadium, established in 1974, has a capacity to hold 33,100 spectators and is currently the most popular venue in the city. It has hosted 24 Test matches. It also hosted the 2011 World Cup final, in which India became the first team to win the World Cup at home soil. It was the unofficial successor of the Brabourne Stadium, which is also located in Mumbai. Mumbai is often considered the cricketing capital of India because of its fans and the talent it produces via the domestic Mumbai cricket team. Thus the stadium regularly hosts major Test matches. The M. A. Chidambaram Stadium in Chennai is also considered to be an important historical Indian cricket ground, established in the early 1900s, it was the site of India's first Test victory. The first ODI match in India was hosted by the Sardar Vallabhbhai Patel Stadium, Ahmedabad during the series against England on 25 November 1981. India played the first T20I match in India at the Brabourne Stadium in Mumbai on 20 October 2007 against the visiting Australian team.

== Captains ==
A total of 35 men have captained the Indian men's cricket team in at least one Test match, although only six have led the team in more than 25 matches, and six have captained the team in men's ODIs but not Tests. India's first captain of the men's cricket team was C. K. Nayudu, who led the team in four matches against England: one in England in 1932 and a series of three matches at home in 1933–34. Lala Amarnath, India's fourth captain of the men's cricket team and the first Indian to score a century in Test cricket while playing for India, led the team in its first Test match after Indian independence. He also captained the team to its first Test victory and first series win, both in a three-match series at home against Pakistan in 1952–53. From 1952 until 1961–62, India men's cricket team had a number of captains such as Vijay Hazare, Polly Umrigar and Nari Contractor.

The Nawab of Pataudi, Mansoor Ali Khan Pataudi, was the men's team's captain for 36 Test matches from 1961–62 to 1969–70, returning for another four matches against West Indies in 1974–75. In the early years of his captaincy tenure, the team was whitewashed in the West Indies, England and Australia. However, in 1967–68, Pataudi led India men's cricket team on its maiden New Zealand tour, which ended in India winning the Test series 3–1. In 1970–71, Ajit Wadekar took over the captaincy from Pataudi. Under Wadekar's captaincy, India registered its first Test series win in the West Indies and England. India played its first men's ODI in 1974, also under his captaincy. India won its first men's ODI under the captaincy of Srinivasaraghavan Venkataraghavan in the 1975 World Cup, against East Africa. Between 1975–76 and 1978–79, Bishan Singh Bedi captained the team in 22 men's Tests and four ODIs, winning six Tests and one ODI.

Sunil Gavaskar took over as men's Test and ODI captain in 1978–79, leading India in 47 Test matches and 37 ODIs, winning nine Tests and 14 ODIs. He was succeeded by Kapil Dev in the 1980s, who captained for 34 Test matches, including four victories. Kapil Dev led India to victory in 39 of his 74 ODIs in charge, including the 1983 Cricket World Cup. Kapil Dev also captained India's 2–0 Test series victory in England in 1986. The captaincy shuffled between Dev and Gavaskar, with Gavaskar captaining India to triumph in the inaugural 1984 Asia Cup and 1985 World Championship of Cricket.

Between 1987–88 and 1989–90, India had three captains in Dilip Vengsarkar, Ravi Shastri and Krishnamachari Srikkanth. Vengsarkar took over the captaincy from Kapil Dev after the 1987 World Cup. Although he started with two centuries in his first series as captain, his captaincy period was turbulent and he lost the job following a disastrous tour of the West Indies in early 1989 and a stand-off with the Indian Cricket Board (BCCI).

India has had six regular Test captains of the men's cricket team since Mohammad Azharuddin took charge in 1989. Azharuddin led the team in 47 Test matches from 1989–90 to 1998–99, winning 14, and in 174 ODIs, winning 90. He was followed by Sachin Tendulkar, who captained the men's cricket team in 25 Test matches and 73 ODIs in the late 1990s; Tendulkar was relatively unsuccessful as a captain, winning only four Test matches and 23 ODIs.

Sourav Ganguly became the regular captain of the men's team in both Tests and ODIs in 2000. He remained captain until 2005–06 and became the then most successful Indian captain, winning 21 of his 49 Test matches in charge and 76 of his 146 ODIs. Under his captaincy, India became the joint-winners of the 2002 ICC Champions Trophy with Sri Lanka, and through three consecutive ICC finals - the Champions Trophy finals of 2000 and 2002 along with the World Cup final of 2003. India lost only three Tests at home under Ganguly and managed to draw Test series in England and Australia.

Rahul Dravid took over as men's Test captain in 2005. In 2006, he led India to its first Test series victory in the West Indies in more than 30 years.

In September 2007, MS Dhoni was named as the new captain of the men's ODI and T20I teams, after Dravid stepped down from the post. Soon after taking up the captaincy, Dhoni led the team to the inaugural T20 World Cup title. Anil Kumble was appointed Test captain in November 2007, but retired from international cricket in November 2008 after captaining in 14 Tests. Dhoni succeeded him as the men's Test captain, making him the captain in all formats. Under the captaincy of Dhoni, the Indian men's cricket team held the number one position in the ICC Men's Test Team Rankings for 21 months (from November 2009 to August 2011), and set a national record for most back-to-back ODI wins (nine straight wins). Dhoni also led the team to victory in 2011 Cricket World Cup and 2013 ICC Champions Trophy. Thus, Dhoni became the first captain in history to win all three major ICC trophies. Dhoni also took the team to the final of the 2014 T20 World Cup. However, the team performed poorly in away Tests from 2011 to 2014 and Dhoni retired from Test cricket in December 2014, with Virat Kohli being named as the new Test captain. Dhoni resigned as captain of the ODI and T20I teams in January 2017 and Kohli succeeded him at the position.

Under Kohli's captaincy, India was unbeaten in 19 Test matches, starting from a 3–0 series win over New Zealand and ending with a 2–1 series win over Australia. India also had an unbeaten streak of winning nine consecutive Test series, starting with a 3–0 series win over Sri Lanka in Sri Lanka and ending with a 1–0 series win over Sri Lanka at home. India also became only the third team after Australia and South Africa to have won their most recent Test series simultaneously against all the other Test-playing nations. As per winning percentage in Test matches, Kohli was India's second most successful Test captain, behind Ajinkya Rahane, having won more than 58% of Test matches (at least two games). He took India to the 2017 Champions Trophy and 2021 World Test Championship finals.

In November 2021, Rohit Sharma was appointed as the new T20I captain of the Indian men's cricket team after Kohli resigned from the role. Kohli led India one last time in T20Is at the T20 World Cup 2021. Under Rohit Sharma's first series as permanent captaincy, India whitewashed New Zealand at home in the T20I series 3–0. In December 2021, Sharma was also appointed as the new ODI captain of the Indian men's cricket team, replacing Kohli ahead of their away series against South Africa. Kohli later quit as Test captain as well, after their Test series loss to South Africa. Sharma replaced Kohli as Test captain before the Test series against Sri Lanka and was then the full-time captain of the Indian men's cricket team. Rohit took India to the finals of the 2023 World Test Championship and 2023 World Cup, and victories in the 2024 T20 World Cup and 2025 Champions Trophy. Sharma was then succeeded as Test and ODI captain by Shubman Gill, and T20I captain by Suryakumar Yadav. Suryakumar led the winning Indian team in the 2026 T20 World Cup.

=== Most matches as captain in all formats ===
Rank	Matches	Player	Won	Lost	Tied	Draw	%Won	%Lost	Period
1	332	MS Dhoni	178	120	6	15	53.61	36.14	2007–2018
2	221	Mohammad Azharuddin	104	90	2	19	47.05	40.72	1990–1999
3	213	Virat Kohli	135	60	3	11	63.38	28.16	2013–2022
4	195	Sourav Ganguly	97	78	0	15	49.74	40.00	1999–2005
5	141	Rohit Sharma	102	33	2	3	72.34	23.40	2017–2025
Last updated: 4 March 2025

== Current squad ==
The BCCI released the list of their 2025–26 annual player contracts on 9 February 2026. Players can still be upgraded to a Grade C annual player contract on a pro-rata basis by meeting the criteria of playing a minimum of three Tests or eight ODIs or ten T20Is in the specified period (1 October 2025 to 30 September 2026).

This is a list of every active player who is contracted to BCCI, has played for India since September 2025 or was named in the recent Test, ODI or T20I squads. Uncapped players are listed in italics.

Last updated: 30 October 2026

Key

Name	Age	Batting style	Bowling style	Domestic team	IPL team	CG	Forms	No.	Captaincy	Last Test	Last ODI	Last T20I
Batters
Ruturaj Gaikwad	29	Right-handed	Right-arm off break	Maharashtra	Chennai Super Kings	C	ODI	31		—N/a	(New Zealand) 2026	(Zimbabwe) 2024
Suryakumar Yadav	36	Right-handed	Right-arm off break	Mumbai	Mumbai Indians	B	T20I	63		(Australia) 2023	(Australia) 2023	(New Zealand) 2026
Shubman Gill	27	Right-handed	Right-arm off break	Punjab	Gujarat Titans	A	Test, ODI	77	Test, ODI (c)	(Sri Lanka) 2026	(New Zealand) 2026	(South Africa) 2025
Shreyas Iyer	31	Right-handed	Right-arm leg spin	Mumbai	Punjab Kings	B	ODI, T20I	96	T20I (c) ODI (VC)	(England) 2024	(New Zealand) 2026	(New Zealand) 2026
Yashasvi Jaiswal	24	Left-handed	Right-arm leg spin	Mumbai	Rajasthan Royals	B	Test, ODI	64		(Sri Lanka) 2026	(Afghanistan) 2026	(Sri Lanka) 2024
Virat Kohli	38	Right-handed	Right-arm medium	Delhi	Royal Challengers Bengaluru	B	ODI	18		(Australia) 2025	(New Zealand) 2026	(South Africa) 2024
Devdutt Padikkal	26	Left-handed	Right-arm off break	Karnataka	Royal Challengers Bengaluru	—N/a	Test	37		(Sri Lanka) 2026	—N/a	(Sri Lanka) 2021
Rohit Sharma	39	Right-handed	Right-arm off break	Mumbai	Mumbai Indians	B	ODI	45		(Australia) 2024	(New Zealand) 2026	(South Africa) 2024
Rinku Singh	29	Left-handed	Right-arm off break	Uttar Pradesh	Kolkata Knight Riders	C	T20I	35		—N/a	(South Africa) 2023	(Zimbabwe) 2026
Vaibhav Sooryavanshi	15	Left-handed	Slow left-arm orthodox	Bihar	Rajasthan Royals	—N/a	T20I	03		—N/a	—N/a	(New Zealand) 2026
Sai Sudharsan	25	Left-handed	Right-arm leg break	Tamil Nadu	Gujarat Titans	C	Test	51		(Afghanistan) 2026	(South Africa) 2023	(Zimbabwe) 2024
All-rounders
Naman Dhir	26	Right-handed	Right-arm off break	Punjab	Mumbai Indians	—N/a	ODI, T20I	46		—N/a	(New Zealand) 2026	(New Zealand) 2026
Shivam Dube	33	Left-handed	Right-arm medium	Mumbai	Chennai Super Kings	C	ODI, T20I	25		—N/a	(England) 2026	(Cricket West Indies) 2026
Harsh Dubey	24	Left-handed	Slow left-arm orthodox	Vidarbha	Sunrisers Hyderabad	—N/a	ODI	19		—N/a	(Afghanistan) 2026	—N/a
Saransh Jain	33	Left-handed	Right-arm offbreak	Madhya Pradesh	—N/a		Test	50		(Sri Lanka) 2026	—N/a	—N/a
Ravindra Jadeja	37	Left-handed	Slow left-arm orthodox	Saurashtra	Rajasthan Royals	A	Test, ODI	8		(Sri Lanka) 2026	(Cricket West Indies) 2026	(South Africa) 2024
Hardik Pandya	33	Right-handed	Right-arm medium-fast	Baroda	Punjab Kings	B	ODI, T20I	33		(England) 2018	(New Zealand) 2025	(New Zealand) 2026
Axar Patel	32	Left-handed	Slow left-arm orthodox	Gujarat	Delhi Capitals	C	Test, ODI, T20I	20		(South Africa) 2025	(New Zealand) 2026	(New Zealand) 2026
Nitish Kumar Reddy	23	Right-handed	Right arm medium-fast	Andhra Pradesh	Sunrisers Hyderabad	C	Test, ODI, T20I	88		(South Africa) 2025	(Cricket West Indies) 2026	(New Zealand) 2026
Abhishek Sharma	26	Left-handed	Slow left-arm orthodox	Punjab	Sunrisers Hyderabad	C	T20I	4		—N/a	—N/a	(New Zealand) 2026
Suryansh Shedge	23	Right-handed	Right-arm medium-fast	Mumbai	Punjab Kings	—N/a	T20I	99		—N/a	—N/a	(Zimbabwe) 2026
Washington Sundar	27	Left-handed	Right-arm off break	Tamil Nadu	Gujarat Titans	B	Test, ODI, T20I	5		(Afghanistan) 2026	(England) 2026	(Pakistan) 2026
Manav Suthar	24	Left-handed	Slow left-arm orthodox	Rajasthan	Gujarat Titans	—N/a	Test	30		(Sri Lanka) 2026	—N/a	—N/a
Tilak Varma	24	Left-handed	Right-arm off break	Hyderabad	Mumbai Indians	C	ODI, T20I	72	T20I (vc)	—N/a	(South Africa) 2025	(New Zealand) 2026
Wicket-keeper-batters
Dhruv Jurel	25	Right-handed	—N/a	Uttar Pradesh	Rajasthan Royals	C	Test	21		(Sri Lanka) 2026	—N/a	(England) 2025
Ishan Kishan	28	Left-handed	—N/a	Jharkhand	Sunrisers Hyderabad	—N/a	ODI, T20I	32		(Cricket West Indies) 2023	(New Zealand) 2026	(New Zealand) 2026
Rishabh Pant	29	Left-handed	—N/a	Delhi	Delhi Capitals	B	Test	17		(Sri Lanka) 2026	(Sri Lanka) 2024	(Sri Lanka) 2024
KL Rahul	34	Right-handed	—N/a	Karnataka	Delhi Capitals	B	Test, ODI	1	Test (vc)	(Sri Lanka) 2026	(New Zealand) 2026	(England) 2022
Sanju Samson	32	Right-handed	—N/a	Kerala	Chennai Super Kings	C	T20I	9		—N/a	(South Africa) 2023	(New Zealand) 2026
Pace bowlers
Gurnoor Brar	26	Left-handed	Right-arm fast	Punjab	Gujarat Titans	—N/a	ODI	15		—N/a	(New Zealand) 2026	—N/a
Jasprit Bumrah	32	Right-handed	Right-arm fast	Gujarat	Mumbai Indians	A	Test, ODI, T20I	93		(South Africa) 2025	(England) 2026	(New Zealand) 2026
Akash Deep	29	Right-handed	Right arm fast-medium	Bengal	Kolkata Knight Riders	C	Test	41		(England) 2025	—N/a	—N/a
Prasidh Krishna	30	Right-handed	Right arm fast	Karnataka	Gujarat Titans	C	Test, ODI, T20I	24		(Sri Lanka) 2026	(Cricket West Indies) 2026	(Ireland) 2026
Anshul Kamboj	25	Right-handed	Right arm medium-fast	Haryana	Chennai Super Kings	—N/a	Test, ODI	47		(England) 2026	(New Zealand) 2026	—N/a
Bhuvneshwar Kumar	36	Right-handed	Right arm medium	Uttar Pradesh	Royal Challengers Bengaluru	—N/a	T20I	78		(South Africa) 2018	(South Africa) 2022	(New Zealand) 2026
Auqib Nabi	30	Right-handed	Right arm medium-fast	Jammu and Kashmir	Delhi Capitals	—N/a	ODI	13		—N/a	(New Zealand) 2026	—N/a
Harshit Rana	24	Right-handed	Right arm fast	Delhi	Kolkata Knight Riders	C	ODI, T20I	22		(Australia) 2024	(New Zealand) 2026	(England) 2026
Ashok Sharma	24	Right-handed	Right arm fast	Rajasthan	Gujarat Titans	—N/a	T20I	45		—N/a	—N/a	(Zimbabwe) 2026
Arshdeep Singh	27	Left-handed	Left-arm medium-fast	Punjab	Mumbai Indians	C	ODI, T20I	2		—N/a	(New Zealand) 2026	(New Zealand) 2026
Mohammed Siraj	32	Right-handed	Right-arm fast	Hyderabad	Gujarat Titans	B	Test, ODI	73		(Sri Lanka) 2026	(New Zealand) 2026	(United States) 2026
Yash Thakur	27	Right-handed	Right arm fast-medium	Vidarbha	Punjab Kings	—N/a	T20I,ODI	60		—N/a	(New Zealand) 2026	(Japan) 2026
Mayank Yadav	24	Right-handed	Right arm fast	Delhi	Lucknow Super Giants	—N/a	T20I	44		—N/a	—N/a	(New Zealand) 2026
Prince Yadav	24	Right-handed	Right arm fast-medium	Delhi	Lucknow Super Giants	—N/a	ODI, T20I	16		—N/a	(England) 2026	(New Zealand) 2026
Spin bowlers
Ravi Bishnoi	26	Right-handed	Right-arm leg spin	Gujarat	Rajasthan Royals	C	T20I	56		—N/a	(South Africa) 2022	(Pakistan) 2026
Varun Chakravarthy	35	Right-handed	Right-arm leg break	Tamil Nadu	Kolkata Knight Riders	C	ODI, T20I	29		—N/a	(New Zealand) 2025	(Afghanistan) 2026
Kuldeep Yadav	31	Left-handed	Left-arm wrist spin	Uttar Pradesh	Lucknow Super Giants	B	Test, ODI, T20I	23		(Sri Lanka) 2026	(New Zealand) 2026	(Cricket West Indies) 2026

=== Pay grade ===
BCCI awards central contracts to its players, their pay is graded according to the importance of the player. Players' salaries are as follows:

- Grade A – ₹5 crore (US$530,000)
- Grade B – ₹3 crore (US$320,000)
- Grade C – ₹1 crore (US$110,000)

Match fees

Players also receive a match fee of ₹15 lakh (US$16,000) per Test match, ₹6 lakh (US$6,400) per ODI, and ₹3 lakh (US$3,200) per T20I.

== Coaching staff ==
Position	Name
Head coach	Gautam Gambhir
Batting coach	Sitanshu Kotak
Fast Bowling coach	Morné Morkel
Spin Bowling coach	Sairaj Bahutule
Fielding coach	Subhadeep Ghosh

== Tournament history ==
A red box around the year indicates tournaments played within India

Key
Champions
Runners-up
Semi-finals

=== Cricket World Cup ===
Year	Round	Position	P	W	L	T	NR	Squad	Ref
(England) 1975	Group Stage	6/8	3	1	2	0	0	Squad	
(England) 1979	Group Stage	7/8	3	0	3	0	0	Squad	
(England) (Wales) 1983	Champions	1/8	8	6	2	0	0	Squad	
(India) (Pakistan) 1987	Semi-finals	3/8	7	5	2	0	0	Squad	
(Australia) (New Zealand) 1992	Group Stage	7/9	8	2	5	0	1	Squad	
(India) (Pakistan) (Sri Lanka) 1996	Semi-finals	3/12	7	4	3	0	0	Squad	
(England) (Republic of Ireland) (Netherlands) (Scotland) (Wales) 1999	Super Six	6/12	8	4	4	0	0	Squad	
(South Africa) (Zimbabwe) (Kenya) 2003	Runners-up	2/14	11	9	2	0	0	Squad	
(Cricket West Indies) 2007	Group Stage	9/16	3	1	2	0	0	Squad	
(India) (Sri Lanka) (Bangladesh) 2011	Champions	1/14	9	7	1	1	0	Squad	
(Australia) (New Zealand) 2015	Semi-finals	3/14	8	7	1	0	0	Squad	
(England) (Wales) 2019	Semi-finals	3/10	10	7	2	0	1	Squad	
(India) 2023	Runners-up	2/10	11	10	1	0	0	Squad	
(South Africa) (Zimbabwe) (Namibia) 2027	Qualified								
(India) (Bangladesh) 2031	Qualified as co-hosts								
Total	2 Titles	13/13	96	63	30	1	2		

=== T20 World Cup ===
Year	Round	Position	P	W	L	T	NR	Squad	Ref
(South Africa) 2007	Champions	1/12	7	4	1	1	1	Squad	
(England) 2009	Super 8s	7/12	5	2	3	0	0	Squad	
(Cricket West Indies) 2010	Super 8s	8/12	5	2	3	0	0	Squad	
(Sri Lanka) 2012	Super 8s	5/12	5	4	1	0	0	Squad	
(Bangladesh) 2014	Runners-up	2/16	6	5	1	0	0	Squad	
(India) 2016	Semi-finals	4/16	5	3	2	0	0	Squad	
(United Arab Emirates) (Oman) 2021	Super 12s	6/16	5	3	2	0	0	Squad	
(Australia) 2022	Semi-finals	3/16	6	4	2	0	0	Squad	
(Cricket West Indies) (United States) 2024	Champions	1/20	9	8	0	0	1	Squad	
(India) (Sri Lanka) 2026	Champions	1/20	9	8	1	0	0	Squad	
(Australia) (New Zealand) 2028	Qualified								
(England) (Wales) (Scotland) (Republic of Ireland) 2030	To be determined								
Total	3 Titles	10/10	61	43	16	1	2		

=== World Test Championship ===
Season	League stage										Final			
Season	Standing	Matches					DED	PC	Points	PCT	Venue	Final	Position	Ref
Season	Standing	P	W	L	D	T	DED	PC	Points	PCT	Venue	Final	Position	Ref
2019–2021	1/9	17	12	4	1	0	0	720	520	72.2	Rose Bowl, England	Lost to New Zealand by 8 wickets	Runners Up	
2021–2023	2/9	18	10	5	3	0	5	216	127	58.80	The Oval, England	Lost to Australia by 209 runs	Runners Up	
2023–2025	3/9	19	9	8	2	0	2	228	114	50.00	Lord's, England	Did Not Qualify	Third Place	

=== Champions Trophy ===
Year	Round	Position	P	W	L	T	NR	Squad	Ref
(Bangladesh) 1998	Semi-finals	3/9	2	1	1	0	0	Squad	
(Kenya) 2000	Runners-up	2/11	4	3	1	0	0	Squad	
(Sri Lanka) 2002	Champions	1/12	5	3	0	0	2	Squad	
(England) 2004	Group Stage	7/12	2	1	1	0	0	Squad	
(India) 2006	Group Stage	5/10	3	1	2	0	0	Squad	
(South Africa) 2009	Group Stage	5/8	3	1	1	0	1	Squad	
(England) (Wales) 2013	Champions	1/8	5	5	0	0	0	Squad	
(England) (Wales) 2017	Runners-up	2/8	5	3	2	0	0	Squad	
(Pakistan) (United Arab Emirates) 2025	Champions	1/8	5	5	0	0	0	Squad	
(India) 2029	Qualified as hosts								
Total	3 Titles	9/9	34	23	8	0	3		

=== Asia Cup ===
Year	Round	Position	P	W	L	T	NR	Ref
(United Arab Emirates) 1984	Champions	1/3	2	2	0	0	0	
(Sri Lanka) 1986	Boycotted the tournament							
(Bangladesh) 1988	Champions	1/4	4	3	1	0	0	
(India) 1990–91	Champions	1/3	3	2	1	0	0	
(United Arab Emirates) 1995	Champions	1/4	4	3	1	0	0	
(Sri Lanka) 1997	Runners Up	2/4	4	1	2	0	1	
(Bangladesh) 2000	First Round	3/4	3	1	2	0	0	
(Sri Lanka) 2004	Runners Up	2/6	6	3	3	0	0	
(Pakistan) 2008	Runners Up	2/6	6	4	2	0	0	
(Sri Lanka) 2010	Champions	1/4	4	3	1	0	0	
(Bangladesh) 2012	First Round	3/4	3	2	1	0	0	
(Bangladesh) 2014	First Round	3/5	4	2	2	0	0	
(Bangladesh) 2016	Champions	1/5	5	5	0	0	0	
(United Arab Emirates) 2018	Champions	1/6	6	5	0	1	0	
(United Arab Emirates) 2022	Super Fours	3/6	5	3	2	0	0	
(Pakistan) (Sri Lanka) 2023	Champions	1/6	6	4	1	0	1	
(United Arab Emirates) 2025	Champions	1/8	7	7	0	0	0	
Total	9 Titles	16/17	72	50	19	1	2	

=== Olympic Games ===
Year	Round	Position	Played	Won	Lost	Tie	NR
(United States) 2028	To be determined						
Total							

=== Asian Games ===
Year	Round	Position	P	W	L	T	NR	Ref
(China) 2010	Did not participate							
(South Korea) 2014	Did not participate							
(China) 2022	Gold	1/14	3	2	0	0	1	
(Japan) 2026	Gold	1/10	3	2	0	0	1	
Total	2 Titles	2/4	6	4	0	0	2	

=== Commonwealth Games ===
Year	Round	Position	P	W	L	T	NR	Ref
(Malaysia) 1998	Group Stage	9/16	3	1	1	0	1	
Total	0 Title	1/1	3	1	1	0	1	

=== Defunct tournaments ===
Tournaments
Australian Tri-Series	Asian Test Championship	Austral-Asia Cup	NatWest Series	World Championship of Cricket	Nehru Cup	Hero Cup	Nidahas Trophy
(Australia) 1980–81: 3rd place; (Australia) 1985–86: Runners-up; (Australia) 1991–92: Runners-up; (Australia) 1999–2000: 3rd place; (Australia) 2003–04: Runners-up; (Australia) 2007–08: Champions; (Australia) 2011–12: 3rd place; (Australia) 2014–15: 3rd place	(India) (Pakistan) (Sri Lanka) 1999: Group stage	(United Arab Emirates) 1986: Runners-up; (United Arab Emirates) 1990: Group stage; (United Arab Emirates) 1994: Runners-up	(England) 2002: Champions	(Australia) 1985: Champions	(India) 1989: Semi-finalist	(India) 1993: Champions	(Sri Lanka) 1998: Champions; (Sri Lanka) 2018: Champions

== Honours ==
India national cricket team honours
Type	Competition	Titles	Seasons
ICC Championships	Cricket World Cup	2	Champions (2): 1983, 2011; Runners-up (2): 2003, 2023
ICC Championships	T20 World Cup	3	Champions (3): 2007, 2024, 2026; Runners-up (1): 2014
ICC Championships	Champions Trophy	3	Champions (3): 2002^{s}, 2013, 2025; Runners-up (2): 2000, 2017
ICC Championships	World Test Championship	–	Runners-up (2): 2019–21, 2021–23
ICC Awards	ICC Test Championship	5	Winners (5): 2010, 2011, 2017, 2018, 2019
ICC Awards	ICC ODI Championship	1	Winners (1): 2013
ACC (Continental)	Asia Cup	9	Champions (9): 1984, 1988, 1990–91, 1995, 2010, 2016, 2018, 2023, 2025; Runners-up (3): 1997, 2004, 2008
Multi-sport	Asian Games	2	Gold medal (2): 2022, 2026

record

^{s} shared.

== Statistics ==
=== Tests ===
Head-to-head record

Won more matches than lost
All matches drawn/tied/no result
Won equal matches to lost
Lost more matches than won

Opponent	Matches	Won	Lost	Tied	Draw	% Won	% Lost	% Drew	First	Last
Afghanistan	2	2	0	0	0	100.00	0.00	0.00	2018	2026
Australia	112	33	48	1	30	29.91	43.30	26.78	1947	2025
Bangladesh	15	13	0	0	2	86.66	0.00	13.33	2000	2024
England	141	37	53	0	51	26.24	37.58	36.17	1932	2025
New Zealand	65	22	16	0	27	33.84	24.61	41.53	1955	2024
Pakistan	59	9	12	0	38	15.25	20.33	64.40	1952	2007
South Africa	46	16	20	0	10	34.78	43.47	21.73	1992	2025
Sri Lanka	48	23	7	0	18	47.92	14.58	37.50	1982	2026
West Indies	102	25	30	0	47	24.51	29.41	46.08	1948	2025
Zimbabwe	11	7	2	0	2	63.63	18.18	18.18	1992	2005
Total	601	187	188	1	225	31.11	31.28	37.44	1932	2026
Statistics are correct as of India v Sri Lanka at Sinhalese Sports Club Cricket Ground, Colombo, 2nd Test, 23 August - 27 August 2026.

Most Test runs for India

Rank	Runs	Player	Matches	Innings	Average	100	50	Period
1	15,921 ♠	Sachin Tendulkar	200	329	53.78	51	68	1989–2013
2	13,265	Rahul Dravid	163	284	52.63	36	63	1996–2012
3	10,122	Sunil Gavaskar	125	214	51.12	34	45	1971–1987
4	9,230	Virat Kohli	123	210	46.85	30	31	2011–2024
5	8,781	VVS Laxman	134	225	45.97	17	56	1996–2012
Last updated: 5 December 2024

Most Test wickets for India

Rank	Wickets	Player	Matches	Innings	Average	Period
1	619	Anil Kumble	132	236	29.65	1990–2008
2	537	Ravichandran Ashwin	106	200	24.00	2011–2024
3	434	Kapil Dev	131	227	29.64	1978–1994
4	417	Harbhajan Singh	103	190	32.46	1998–2015
5	356	Ravindra Jadeja†	91	171	25.30	2012–2025
Last updated:12 September 2025

=== One-Day Internationals ===
Head-to-head record

Won more matches than lost
All matches tied/no result
Won equal matches to lost
Lost more matches than won

Opponent	Matches	Won	Lost	Tied	No Result	% Won	First	Last
ICC Full Members
Afghanistan	7	6	0	1	0	92.85	2014	2026
Australia	155	59	86	0	10	40.68	1980	2025
Bangladesh	42	33	8	0	1	78.57	1988	2025
England	113	62	46	2	3	54.87	1974	2026
Ireland	3	3	0	0	0	100.00	2007	2015
New Zealand	128	66	53	1	8	55.41	1975	2026
Pakistan	136	58	73	0	5	42.64	1978	2025
South Africa	97	42	52	0	3	44.68	1991	2025
Sri Lanka	171	99	59	2	11	57.89	1979	2024
West Indies	145	74	65	2	4	51.03	1979	2026
Zimbabwe	66	54	10	2	0	81.81	1983	2022
ICC Associate Members
Bermuda	1	1	0	0	0	100.00	2007	2007
East Africa	1	1	0	0	0	100.00	1975	1975
Hong Kong	2	2	0	0	0	100.00	2008	2018
Kenya	13	11	2	0	0	84.62	1996	2004
Namibia	1	1	0	0	0	100.00	2003	2003
Nepal	1	1	0	0	0	100.00	2023	2023
Netherlands	3	3	0	0	0	100.00	2003	2023
Scotland	1	1	0	0	0	100.00	2007	2007
United Arab Emirates	3	3	0	0	0	100.00	1994	2015
Total	1089	580	454	10	45	56.03	1974	2026
Statistics are correct as of India v New Zealand at Bay Oval, Tauranga, 15 November 2026

Most ODI runs for India

Rank	Runs	Player	Matches	Innings	Average	100	50	Period
1	18,426 ♠	Sachin Tendulkar	463	452	44.83	49	96	1989–2012
2	15,195	Virat Kohli†	321	309	58.22	55	80	2008–2026
3	12,150	Rohit Sharma†	296	286	48.60	35	63	2007–2026
4	11,221	Sourav Ganguly	308	297	40.95	22	71	1992–2007
5	10,768	Rahul Dravid	340	314	39.15	12	82	1996–2011
Last updated: 28 September 2026

Most ODI wickets for India

Rank	Wickets	Player	Matches	Innings	Average	SR	4	5	Period
1	334	Anil Kumble	269	263	30.83	43.0	8	2	1990–2007
2	315	Javagal Srinath	229	227	28.08	37.8	7	3	1991–2003
3	288	Ajit Agarkar	191	188	27.85	32.9	12	2	1998–2007
4	269	Zaheer Khan	194	191	30.11	36.4	7	1	2000–2012
5	265	Harbhajan Singh	234	225	33.47	46.6	2	3	1998–2015
Last updated: 4 August 2024

=== Twenty20 Internationals ===
Head-to-head record

Won more matches than lost
All matches tied/no result
Won equal matches to lost
Lost more matches than won

Opponent	Matches	Won	Lost	Tied	Tie+Win	Tie+Loss	No Result	% Won	First	Last
ICC Full Members
Afghanistan	12	10	0	0	1	0	1	95.45	2010	2026
Australia	37	22	12	0	0	0	3	64.70	2007	2025
Bangladesh	18	17	1	0	0	0	0	94.44	2009	2025
England	35	18	16	0	0	0	1	52.94	2007	2026
Ireland	10	8	2	0	0	0	0	80.00	2009	2026
New Zealand	36	20	13	1	2	0	0	59.72	2007	2026
Pakistan	18	14	3	0	1	0	0	80.55	2007	2026
South Africa	36	21	14	0	0	0	1	60.00	2006	2026
Sri Lanka	34	22	9	0	2	0	1	69.69	2009	2026
West Indies	36	22	12	0	0	0	2	64.70	2009	2026
Zimbabwe	17	14	3	0	0	0	0	82.35	2010	2026
ICC Associate members
Hong Kong	1	1	0	0	0	0	0	100.00	2022	2022
Japan	1	1	0	0	0	0	0	100.00	2026	2026
Namibia	2	2	0	0	0	0	0	100.00	2021	2026
Nepal	1	1	0	0	0	0	0	100.00	2023	2023
Netherlands	2	2	0	0	0	0	0	100.00	2022	2026
Oman	1	1	0	0	0	0	0	100.00	2025	2025
Scotland	2	1	0	0	0	0	1	50.00	2007	2021
United Arab Emirates	2	2	0	0	0	0	0	100.00	2016	2025
United States	2	2	0	0	0	0	0	100.00	2024	2026
Total	303	201	85	1	6	0	10	70.82	2006	2026
Statistics are correct as of India v New Zealand at Seddon Park, Hamilton, 1 November 2026

Most T20I runs for India

Rank	Runs	Player	Matches	Innings	Period
1	4,231	Rohit Sharma	159	151	2007–2024
2	4,188	Virat Kohli	125	117	2010–2024
3	3,272	Suryakumar Yadav†	113	106	2021–2026
4	2,288	Hardik Pandya	138	109	2016–2026
5	2,268	Abhishek Sharma†	72	71	2024–2026
Last Updated: 26 February 2026

Most T20I wickets for India

Rank	Wickets	Player	Matches	Innings	Period
1	151	Arshdeep Singh†	104	100	2022-2026
2	126	Jasprit Bumrah†	100	97	2016-2026
3	116	Axar Patel†	116	108	2015-2026
4	114	Hardik Pandya	138	125	2016-2026
5	98	Kuldeep Yadav†	56	54	2017-2026
5	Last Updated: 23 September 2026				

== Individual records ==
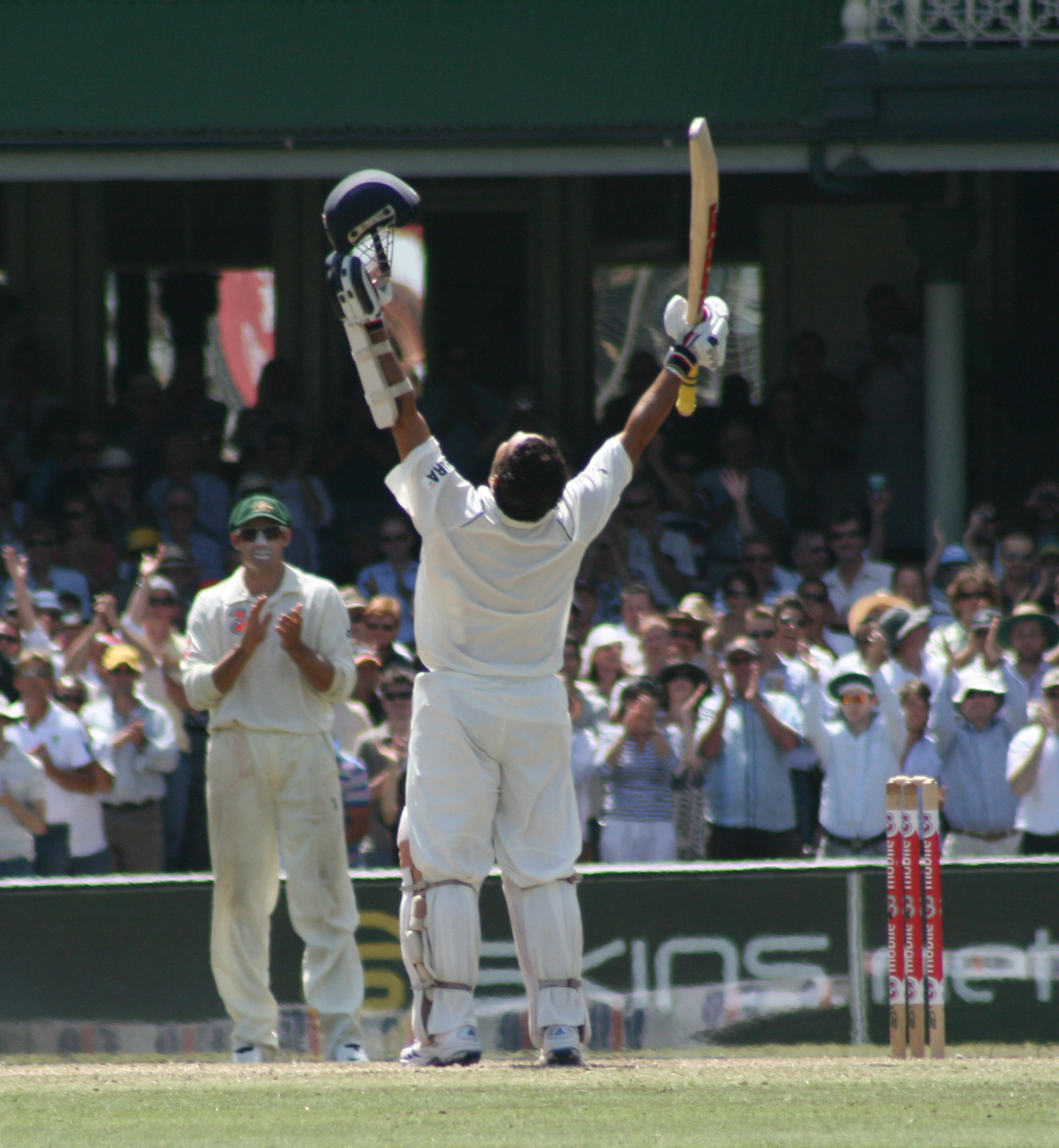
Sachin Tendulkar celebrating his 38th Test century during a match against Australia in 2008. He holds multiple world records including the world's leading run-scorer in both Tests and ODIs and most centuries in Tests.

Sachin Tendulkar, who began playing for India as a 16-year-old in 1989 and has since become the most prolific run-scorer in the history of both Test and ODI cricket, holds a large number of national batting records. He holds the record of most appearances in both Tests and ODIs, most runs in both Tests and ODIs and most centuries in Tests. The highest score by an Indian is the 319 scored by Virender Sehwag in Chennai. It is the second triple century in Test cricket by an Indian, the first being a 309 also made by Sehwag although against Pakistan. The team's highest ever score was a 759/7 against England at MA Chidambaram Stadium, Chennai in 2016, while its lowest score was 36 against Australia in 2020. In ODIs, the team's highest score is 418/5 against West Indies at Indore in 2011–12. India scored 413–5 in a match against Bermuda in 2007 World Cup which was the highest score ever in Cricket World Cup history at the time. In the same match, India set a world record of the highest winning margin in an ODI match of 257 runs.

India has also had some very strong bowling figures, with spin bowler Anil Kumble being a member of the elite group of four bowlers who have taken 600 Test wickets. In 1999, Kumble emulated Jim Laker to become the second bowler to take all ten wickets in a Test match innings when he took 10 wickets for 74 runs against Pakistan at the Feroz Shah Kotla in Delhi.

Many of the Indian cricket team's records are also world records, for example Tendulkar's century tally (in Tests and ODIs) and run tally (also in both Tests and ODIs). Dhoni's 183 not out against Sri Lanka in 2005 is the world record score by a wicketkeeper in ODIs. The Indian cricket team also holds the record sequence of 17 successful run-chases in ODIs, which ended in a dramatic match against the West Indies in May 2006, which India lost by just one run.

Tendulkar was the first batsman to score 200 runs (he was unbeaten on 200 from 147 deliveries including 25 fours and 3 sixes) in a single ODI innings, on 24 February 2010 against South Africa in Gwalior. On 8 December 2011, this achievement was eclipsed by compatriot Virender Sehwag, who scored 219 runs from 149 deliveries (25 fours and 7 sixes) versus the West Indies in Indore. On 13 November 2014 the record was broken by another Indian opening batsmen, Rohit Sharma, who scored 264 runs from 173 deliveries (33 fours and 9 sixes) against Sri Lanka in Kolkata, West Bengal. In 2013, Dhoni became the first captain in history to win all three major ICC trophies- ICC Cricket World Cup in 2011, ICC World Twenty20 in 2007 and ICC Champions Trophy in 2013.

In 2014, Kohli became the first cricketer to win back-to-back Man of the Series awards in the 2014 ICC World Twenty20 and 2016 ICC World Twenty20. Rohit is the most runs scorer in T20Is as of July 2024 and also hold joint most T20I centuries. In 2017, Ravichandran Ashwin became the fastest cricketer in history to reach 250 wickets.

Indian Men's cricketers who have received ICC Cricket Hall of Fame
Inductee	Induction year	Tests		ODIs	
Inductee	Induction year	Matches	Span	Matches	Span
Bishan Bedi	2009	67	1966–1979	10	1974–1979
Kapil Dev	2009	131	1979–1994	225	1978–1994
Sunil Gavaskar	2009	125	1971–1987	108	1974–1987
Anil Kumble	2015	132	1990–2008	271	1990–2007
Rahul Dravid	2018	164	1996–2012	344	1996–2011
Sachin Tendulkar	2019	200	1989–2013	463	1989–2012
Vinoo Mankad	2021	44	1946–1959	0	N/A
Virender Sehwag	2023	104	2001–2013	251	1999–2013
MS Dhoni	2025	90	2005–2014	350	2004–2019

== Fan following ==
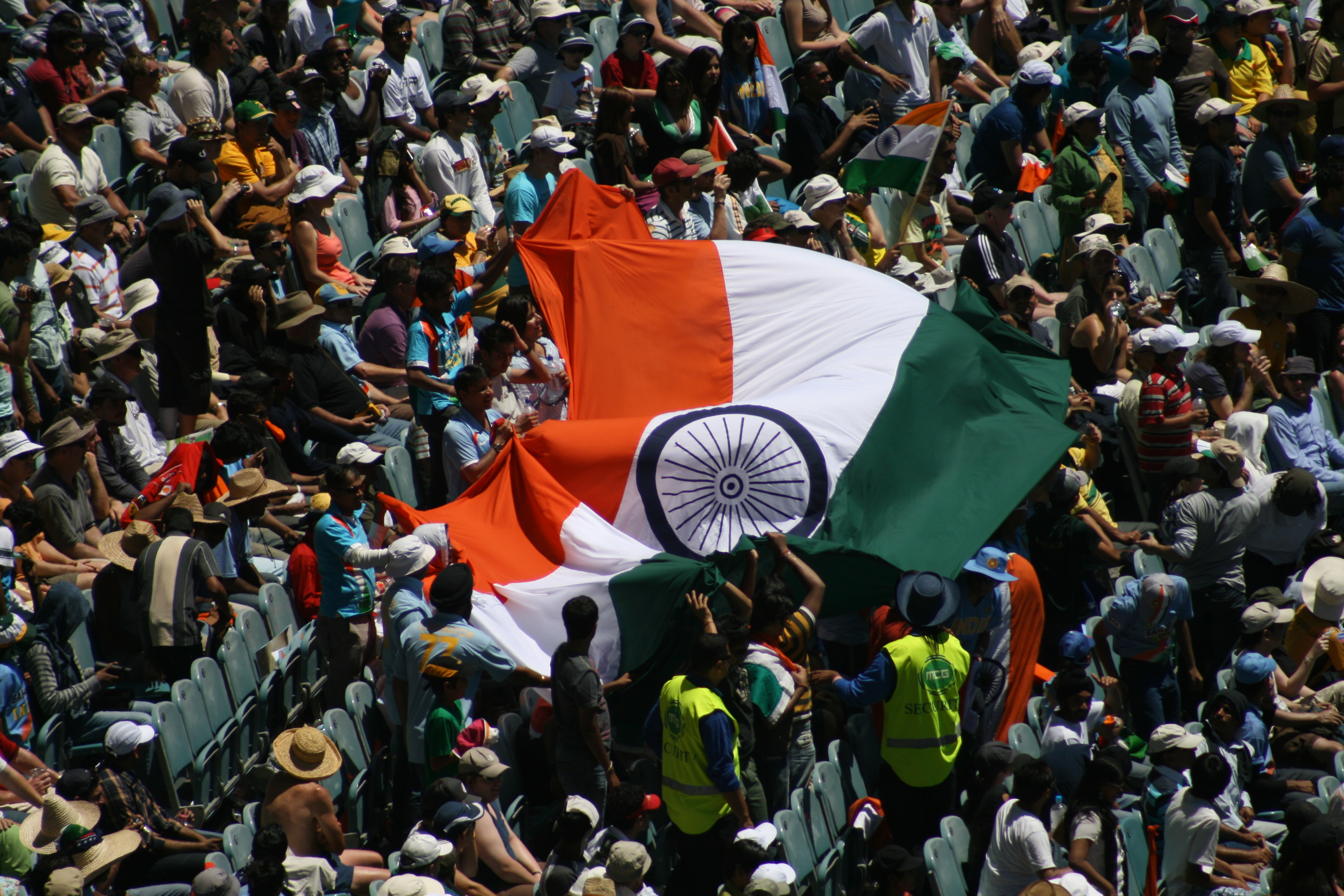
Supporters of the Indian cricket team waving the Indian flag during match between India and Australia at the Melbourne Cricket Ground

Owing to the massive Indian diaspora in nations like Australia, England and South Africa, a large Indian fan turnout is expected whenever India plays in any of these nations. There have been a number of official fan groups that have been formed over the years, including the Bharat Army, the Indian equivalent of the Barmy Army, that were very active in their support when India toured Australia in 2003–04. They are known to attribute a number of popular Indian songs to the cricket team.

Fan rivalry and cross-border tension has created a strong rivalry between the Indian and the Pakistani cricket teams. In tours between these two nations, cricket visas are often employed to accommodate for the tens of thousands of fans wishing to cross the border to watch cricket. This intense fan dedication is one of the major causes of the BCCI's financial success.

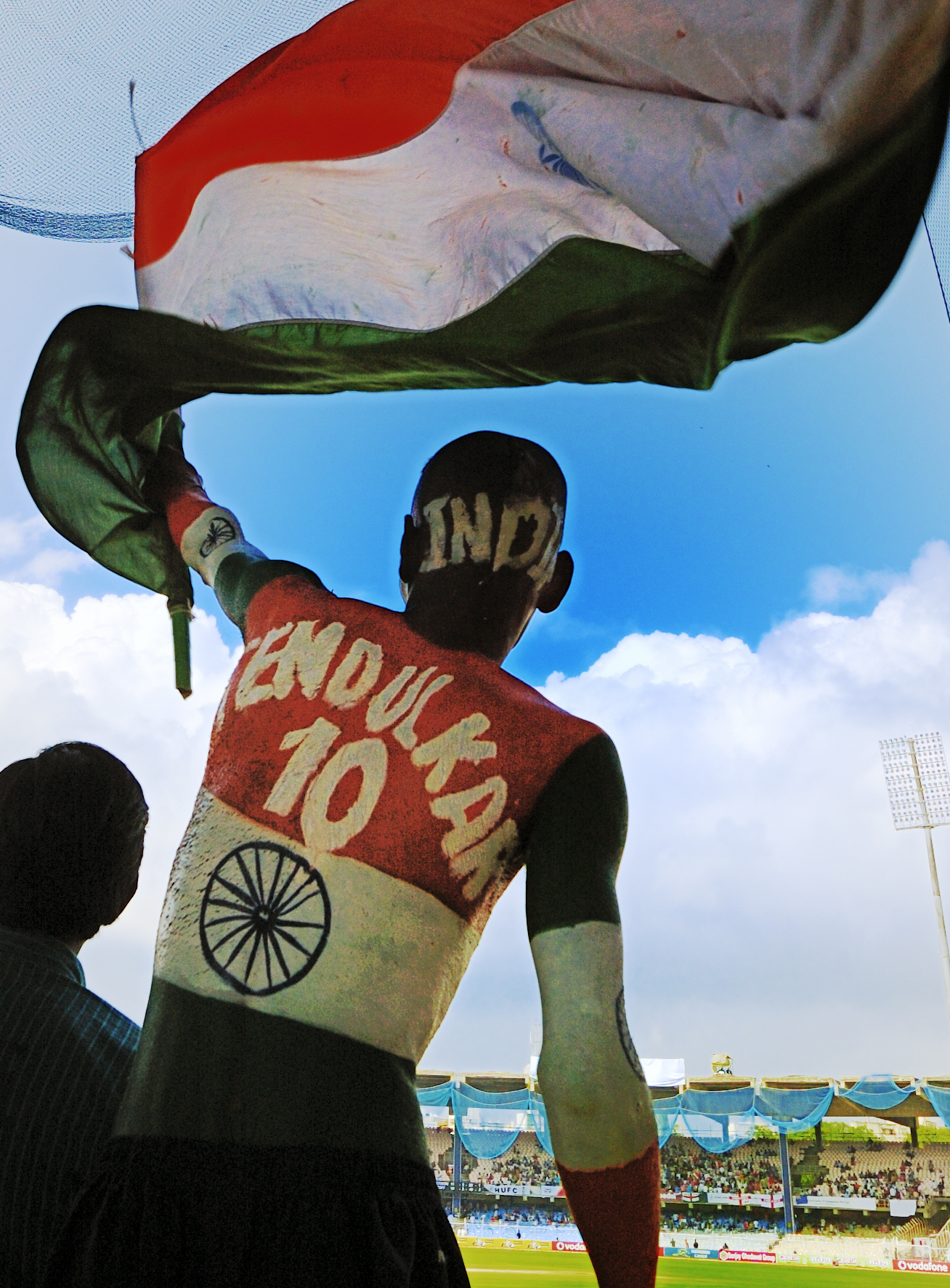
Sudhir Kumar Chaudhary, a fan of the Indian cricket team, travels to all Indian home games with his body painted as the Indian flag.

However, there are downsides to having such a cricket-loving population. Many Indians hold cricket very close to their hearts and losses are not received well by the Indian population. In some cases, particularly after losses to Pakistan or after a long string of weak performances, there have been reports of player effigies being burnt in the streets and vandalism of player homes. In many cases, players have come under intense scrutiny from the media for negative reasons. This has been considered one of the reasons for Ganguly being left out of the Indian team. At times, when a match is surrounded by controversy, it has resulted in a debacle. For example, when India slid to defeat against Australia at Brabourne Stadium in 1969, fans began throwing stones and bottles onto the field as well as setting fire to the stands, before laying siege to the Australian dressing rooms. During the same tour, a stampede occurred at Eden Gardens when tickets were oversold and India fell to another loss; the Australian team bus was later stoned with bricks. A similar event occurred during the 1996 Cricket World Cup, where India were losing the semi-final to Sri Lanka at Eden Gardens. In this case, the fan behaviour was directed at the Indian team in disappointment at their lacklustre performance. An armed guard had to be placed at the home of captain Mohammad Azharuddin to ensure his safety. In 1999, a riot occurred in a Test against Pakistan at Eden Gardens after a collision with Pakistani paceman Shoaib Akhtar saw Sachin be run out, forcing police to eject spectators and the game to be played in an empty stadium. In 2006, a string of low scores resulted in Tendulkar being booed by the Mumbai crowd when he got out against England.

Often, fans engage in protests regarding players if they believe that regionalism has affected selection, or because of regional partisan support for local players. In 2005, when Ganguly was dropped from the team, Ganguly's home town Kolkata erupted in protests. India later played a match against South Africa in Kolkata. The Indian team was booed by the crowd who supported South Africa instead of India in response to Ganguly's dropping. Similar regional divisions in India regarding selection have also caused protests against the team, with political activists from the regional Kalinga Kamgar Sena party in Odisha disrupting the arrival of the team in Cuttack for an ODI over the lack of a local player in the team, with one activist manhandling coach Greg Chappell. Similar treatment was handed to Sunil Gavaskar in the 1987 World Cup semi-finals by crowds at Wankhede Stadium when he got bowled by Phillip DeFreitas.

A successful string of results, especially victories against the arch-rival Pakistan or victories in major ICC tournaments such as the World Cup, the T20 World Cup and the Champions Trophy are greeted with particular ecstasy from the Indian fans. Test rivalries include the Border–Gavaskar Trophy with Australia, the Gandhi–Mandela Trophy with South Africa, and the Anderson–Tendulkar Trophy with England.

== See also ==
- India women's national cricket team
- India national under-19 cricket team
- India women's national under-19 cricket team
- India A cricket team
- India B cricket team
- Board of control for cricket in india (BCCI)
- BCCI Awards
- National Cricket Academy (NCA)
- Cricket in India
- Sport in India – Overview of sports in India
- India–Pakistan cricket rivalry
- Australia–India cricket rivalry
- Glossary of cricket terms

Preceded by New Zealand	Test match playing teams 25 June 1932	Succeeded by Pakistan

Achievements
Preceded by 1979 West Indies	World ODI Champions; 1983 (First title)	Succeeded by 1987 Australia
Preceded by 2007 Australia	World ODI Champions; 2011 (Second title)	Succeeded by 2015 Australia
Preceded by Inaugural Champions	World T20 Champions; 2007 (First title)	Succeeded by 2009 Pakistan
Preceded by 2022 England	World T20 Champions; 2024 (Second title)	Incumbent
Preceded by 2000 New Zealand	Champions Trophy Winners; 2002 (First title (shared))	Succeeded by 2004 West Indies
Preceded by 2009 Australia	Champions Trophy Winners; 2013 (Second title)	Succeeded by 2017 Pakistan
Preceded by 2017 Pakistan	Champions Trophy Winners; 2025 (Third title)	Incumbent
Preceded by Inaugural Champions	Asian Champions; 1984 (First title)	Succeeded by 1986 Sri Lanka
Preceded by 1986 Sri Lanka	Asian Champions; 1988 (Second title); 1990–91 (Third title); 1995 (Fourth title)	Succeeded by 1997 Sri Lanka
Preceded by 2008 Sri Lanka	Asian Champions; 2010 (Fifth title)	Succeeded by 2012 Pakistan
Preceded by 2014 Sri Lanka	Asian Champions; 2016 (Sixth title); 2018 (Seventh title)	Succeeded by 2022 Sri Lanka
Preceded by 2022 Sri Lanka	Asian Champions; 2023 (Eighth title); 2025 (Ninth Title)	Incumbent
