= 2023 Asia Cup =

Cricket tournament in Pakistan and Sri Lanka

- Tournament logo
- Dates: 30 August – 17 September 2023
- Administrator: Asian Cricket Council
- Cricket format: One Day International
- Tournament format(s): Group round-robin and playoffs
- Hosts: Pakistan; Sri Lanka
- Champions: India (8th title)
- Runners-up: Sri Lanka
- Participants: 6
- Matches: 13
- Player of the series: (India) Kuldeep Yadav
- Most runs: (India) Shubman Gill (302)
- Most wickets: (Sri Lanka) Matheesha Pathirana (11)

The 2023 Asia Cup, also known as Super 11 Asia Cup for sponsorship, was the 16th edition of the men's Asia Cup cricket tournament. The matches were played as One Day Internationals (ODIs) with Pakistan as the official host for the 2nd time. It was held in Pakistan and Sri Lanka, between 30 August to 17 September 2023. It was the first Asia Cup to be held in multiple countries, with four matches played in Pakistan and the remaining nine matches played in Sri Lanka. The tournament was contested by 6 teams. Sri Lanka were the defending champions.

The five full members of the Asian Cricket Council were part of the tournament: Afghanistan, Bangladesh, India, Pakistan and Sri Lanka. They were joined by Nepal, who qualified by winning the 2023 ACC Men's Premier Cup. For the first time, the tournament was held in a "hybrid format" with the games organised in two countries. All teams played at least a few games in Pakistan, except for India, who refused to travel to Pakistan due to disapproval from the Indian government. In January 2023, the Asian Cricket Council (ACC) announced the pathway structure and calendar for 2023 and 2024, where they confirmed the dates and format of the tournament. Originally, the tournament was scheduled to take place in 2021, but was postponed to 2023 due to the COVID-19 pandemic. The fixtures for the tournament were announced on 19 July 2023. India defeated Sri Lanka by 10 wickets in the final to win their eighth Asia Cup title; with a record number of balls remaining (263).

== Background ==
In June 2020, following a meeting with the Asian Cricket Council (ACC), the Pakistan Cricket Board (PCB) said they would be willing to let Sri Lanka host the 2020 Asia Cup, with India unwilling to travel to Pakistan. The ACC issued a press release following the meeting stating that "in light of the impact and consequences of the COVID-19 pandemic, possible venue options for the Asia Cup 2020 were discussed and it was decided to take the final decision in due course". In July 2020, an official announcement of the postponement was made by the ACC. The 2020 edition was rescheduled to take place in Sri Lanka in June 2021.

In March 2021, the tournament was at risk of a further postponement after India qualified for the final of the World Test Championship, which clashed with the proposed dates in June. The tournament was postponed once again to 2023. In May 2021, the ACC announced that the 2021 tournament would be deferred to 2023, citing that it would be difficult to schedule the tournament due to the continued impact of COVID-19 on the scheduling of other cricket events. Pakistan was scheduled to host the 2022 Asia Cup after retaining the rights to host the 2022 edition. However, in October 2021, following a meeting with the ACC, Ramiz Raja confirmed that Pakistan would host the tournament in 2023, with Sri Lanka hosting the 2022 edition.

In October 2022, the Board of Control for Cricket in India (BCCI) secretary and ACC President Jay Shah announced that India would not travel to Pakistan, citing security concerns, and that the Asia Cup 2023 would take place in a neutral venue. In December 2022, the then PCB chairman Ramiz Raja said that Pakistan might consider pulling out of the tournament if their hosting rights were withdrawn because of India's unwillingness to travel to Pakistan. However, in January 2023, ACC confirmed the teams and groups of the tournament, with both India and Pakistan taking part.

The Pakistan Cricket Board (PCB) had threatened to boycott the 2023 Cricket World Cup if the Board of Control for Cricket in India (BCCI) refused to send a team to the 2023 Asia Cup scheduled in Pakistan. In March 2023, it was proposed that Pakistan remain as hosts and that all India matches - including at least two India-Pakistan contests - would be played at a neutral venue yet to be confirmed. The hybrid model proposed by Pakistan was rejected by Sri Lanka and Bangladesh. In response, PCB Chairman Najam Sethi proposed two options. The first option was that India play all their matches at a neutral venue with Pakistan hosting the rest of the teams. The second option was that four matches in the group stage take place in Pakistan whereas the second phase, in which matches played by the Indian team followed by the next stage matches including the final, be played at a neutral venue. Sri Lanka and Bangladesh agreed to the second option.

On 15 June 2023, the Asian Cricket Council announced that the tournament would be organized in a hybrid model with four matches being held in Pakistan, and the remaining nine in Sri Lanka.

== Format ==
The groups and format of the tournament were announced on 9 January 2023, with the six teams split into two groups of three. A total of 13 matches will be played, which includes six league matches, six Super 4 matches, and a final. India, Pakistan and Nepal, champions of the qualifier event (2023 ACC Men's Premier Cup), were placed in Group A, while the defending champions Sri Lanka was grouped with Bangladesh and Afghanistan in Group B. The top two teams from each of the groups will progress to the Super 4. From there, the top two teams will play each other in the final.

Pakistan and India were seeded as A1 & A2, and Bangladesh and Sri Lanka were seeded as B2 & B1. In case Nepal and Afghanistan qualify for the Super Four stage, they will take the slot of the team knocked out (Pakistan or India in Group A and Sri Lanka or Bangladesh in Group B).

== Teams and qualification ==
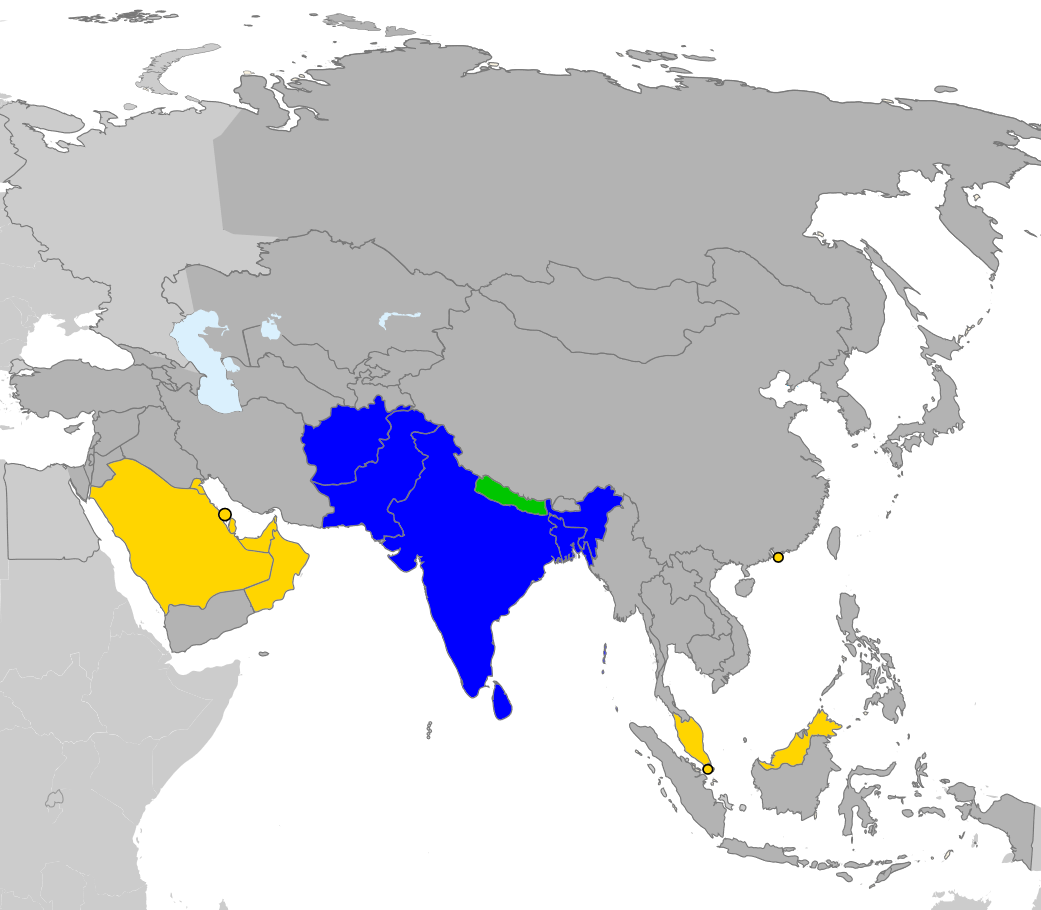
Qualified for Asia Cup as full members Qualified through 2023 ACC Men's Premier Cup Failed to qualify

The five full members of the Asian Cricket Council qualified automatically for the tournament while Nepal qualified for the main tournament for the first time through 2023 ACC Men's Premier Cup, was held in April/May 2023 in Nepal, defeating the UAE in the final.

Means of qualification	Date	Hosts	Berth(s)	Qualifier(s)
ICC Full Member	—N/a	—N/a	5	Afghanistan; Bangladesh; India; Pakistan; Sri Lanka
2023 ACC Men's Premier Cup	18 April — 2 May 2023	Nepal	1	Nepal
Total			6	

== Squads ==
Afghanistan	Bangladesh	India	Nepal	Pakistan	Sri Lanka
Hashmatullah Shahidi (c); Rahmanullah Gurbaz (wk); Ibrahim Zadran; Riaz Hassan; Rahmat Shah; Najibullah Zadran; Mohammad Nabi; Ikram Alikhil (wk); Rashid Khan; Gulbadin Naib; Karim Janat; Abdul Rahman; Sharafuddin Ashraf; Mujeeb Ur Rahman; Noor Ahmad; Mohammad Saleem; Fazalhaq Farooqi	Shakib Al Hasan (c); Litton Das (vc); Anamul Haque; Tanzid Hasan; Najmul Hossain Shanto; Towhid Hridoy; Mushfiqur Rahim (wk); Mehidy Hasan; Taskin Ahmed; Mustafizur Rahman; Hasan Mahmud; Mohammad Naim; Mahedi Hasan; Nasum Ahmed; Shamim Hossain; ~~Ebadot Hossain~~; Afif Hossain; Shoriful Islam; Tanzim Hasan Sakib	Rohit Sharma (c); Hardik Pandya (vc); Jasprit Bumrah; Shubman Gill; Shreyas Iyer; Ravindra Jadeja; Ishan Kishan (wk); Prasidh Krishna; Virat Kohli; ~~Axar Patel~~; KL Rahul (wk); Mohammed Shami; Mohammed Siraj; Washington Sundar; Shardul Thakur; Tilak Varma; Kuldeep Yadav; Suryakumar Yadav	Rohit Paudel (c); Aasif Sheikh (wk); Dipendra Singh Airee; Kushal Bhurtel; Mousom Dhakal; Pratis GC; Gulsan Jha; Sundeep Jora; Karan KC; Sompal Kami; Sandeep Lamichhane; Kishor Mahato; Kushal Malla; Lalit Rajbanshi; Aarif Sheikh; Arjun Saud (wk); Bhim Sharki	Babar Azam (c); Shadab Khan (vc); Salman Ali Agha; Shaheen Afridi; Iftikhar Ahmed; Faheem Ashraf; Imam-ul-Haq; Mohammad Haris; Zaman Khan; Mohammad Nawaz; Usama Mir; Haris Rauf; Mohammad Rizwan (wk); Abdullah Shafique; Saud Shakeel; Naseem Shah; Mohammad Wasim; Fakhar Zaman	Dasun Shanaka (c); Kusal Mendis (vc, wk); Pathum Nissanka; Dimuth Karunaratne; Kusal Perera; Sahan Arachchige; Charith Asalanka; Dhananjaya de Silva; Sadeera Samarawickrama; ~~Maheesh Theekshana~~; Dunith Wellalage; Matheesha Pathirana; Kasun Rajitha; Dushan Hemantha; Binura Fernando; Pramod Madushan

Ahead of the tournament, Ebadot Hossain was ruled out of Bangladesh's squad due to an injury and was replaced by Tanzim Hasan Sakib. Saud Shakeel was added to Pakistan's squad, with Tayyab Tahir moved into the reserves. Sanju Samson was added to India's squad as reserves. Initially, on 30 August 2023, Liton Das was ruled out from Bangladesh's squad for the entire tournament with a viral fever, with Anamul Haque named as his replacement. However, after missing out Bangladesh's initial two matches, Das joined the squad after he was declared fit on 2 September 2023. On 5 September 2023, Najmul Hossain Shanto was ruled out of Bangladesh squad for rest of the tournament after he sustained a hamstring injury during their Group Stage match against Afghanistan. On 13 September Naseem Shah was ruled out of Pakistan squad for rest of the tournament after he sustained a shoulder injury during their Super Four match against India. On 16 September Axar Patel was ruled out of India squad for the Asia Cup Final after he sustained multiple injuries during their Super Four match against Bangladesh, he was replaced by Washington Sundar Ahead of the final, Maheesh Theekshana was ruled out of Sri Lanka's squad due to sustaining hamstring injury and was replaced by Sahan Arachchige.

== Venues ==
Pakistan		Sri Lanka	
Lahore	Multan	Colombo	Kandy
Gaddafi Stadium	Multan Cricket Stadium	R. Premadasa Stadium	Pallekele International Cricket Stadium
Capacity: 27,000	Capacity: 30,000	Capacity: 35,000	Capacity: 35,000
Matches: 3	Matches: 1	Matches: 6	Matches: 3
2023 Asia Cup is located in Pakistan		2023 Asia Cup is located in Sri Lanka	

== Match officials ==
International Cricket Council (ICC) and Asian Cricket Council (ACC) jointly appointed the following match officials for the tournament.

=== Match referees ===
- (Australia) David Boon
- (India) Javagal Srinath

=== Umpires ===
- (New Zealand) Chris Gaffaney
- (England) Richard Illingworth
- (India) Jayaraman Madanagopal
- (Sri Lanka) Ruchira Palliyaguruge
- (Bangladesh) Masudur Rahman
- (Zimbabwe) Langton Rusere
- (Afghanistan) Ahmed Shah Pakteen
- (Australia) Paul Wilson
- (Pakistan) Asif Yaqoob

== Group stage ==
=== Group A ===
==== Points table ====
Pos	Team	Pld	W	L	T	NR	Pts	NRR
1	Pakistan (H)	2	1	0	0	1	3	4.760
2	India	2	1	0	0	1	3	1.028
3	Nepal	2	0	2	0	0	0	−3.572

Source: ESPNcricinfo
(H) Host

Advances to Super Four

==== Fixtures ====
30 August 2023
14:30 (PST) (D/N)
Scorecard

Pakistan; 342/6 (50 overs)	v	Nepal; 104 (23.4 overs)
Babar Azam 151 (131); Sompal Kami 2/85 (10 overs)		Sompal Kami 28 (46); Shadab Khan 4/27 (6.4 overs)

Pakistan won by 238 runs
Multan Cricket Stadium, Multan
Umpires: Chris Gaffaney (NZ) and Masudur Rahman (Ban)
Player of the match: Babar Azam (Pak)

- Pakistan won the toss and elected to bat.
- This was the first time Nepal and Pakistan faced each other in ODIs.
- Iftikhar Ahmed (Pak) scored his maiden century in ODIs.
- Babar Azam and Iftikhar Ahmed scored the highest partnership for 5th wicket for Pakistan in ODI.

2 September 2023
15:00 (SLST) (D/N)
Scorecard

India; 266 (48.5 overs)	v	Pakistan
Hardik Pandya 87 (90); Shaheen Afridi 4/35 (10 overs)

No result
Pallekele International Cricket Stadium, Kandy
Umpires: Richard Illingworth (Eng) and Ruchira Palliyaguruge (SL)

- India won the toss and elected to bat.
- Rain prevented any further play.
- As a result of this match, Pakistan qualified for the Super Four.

4 September 2023
15:00 (SLST) (D/N)
Scorecard

Nepal; 230 (48.2 overs)	v	India; 147/0 (20.1 overs)
Aasif Sheikh 58 (97); Ravindra Jadeja 3/40 (10 overs)		Rohit Sharma 74* (59)

India won by 10 wickets (DLS method)
Pallekele International Cricket Stadium, Kandy
Umpires: Paul Wilson (Aus) and Ruchira Palliyaguruge (SL)
Player of the match: Rohit Sharma (Ind)

- India won the toss and elected to field.
- India were set a revised target of 145 runs from 23 overs due to rain.
- This was the first time India and Nepal faced each other in ODIs.
- As the result of this match, India qualified for the Super Four and Nepal were eliminated.

=== Group B ===
==== Points table ====
Pos	Team	Pld	W	L	T	NR	Pts	NRR
1	Sri Lanka (H)	2	2	0	0	0	4	0.594
2	Bangladesh	2	1	1	0	0	2	0.373
3	Afghanistan	2	0	2	0	0	0	−0.910

Source: ESPNcricinfo
(H) Host

Advances to Super Four

==== Fixtures ====
31 August 2023
15:00 (SLST) (D/N)
Scorecard

Bangladesh; 164 (42.4 overs)	v	Sri Lanka; 165/5 (39 overs)
Najmul Hossain Shanto 89 (122); Matheesha Pathirana 4/32 (7.4 overs)		Charith Asalanka 62* (92); Shakib Al Hasan 2/29 (10 overs)

Sri Lanka won by 5 wickets
Pallekele International Cricket Stadium, Kandy
Umpires: Jayaraman Madanagopal (Ind) and Paul Wilson (Aus)
Player of the match: Matheesha Pathirana (SL)

- Bangladesh won the toss and elected to bat.
- Tanzid Hasan (Ban) made his ODI debut.

3 September 2023
14:30 (PST) (D/N)
Scorecard

Bangladesh; 334/5 (50 overs)	v	Afghanistan; 245 (44.3 overs)
Mehidy Hasan 112* (119); Gulbadin Naib 1/58 (8 overs)		Ibrahim Zadran 75 (74); Taskin Ahmed 4/44 (8.3 overs)

Bangladesh won by 89 runs
Gaddafi Stadium, Lahore
Umpires: Asif Yaqoob (Pak) and Langton Rusere (Zim)
Player of the match: Mehidy Hasan (Ban)

- Bangladesh won the toss and elected to bat.
- Shamim Hossain (Ban) made his ODI debut.
- Afghanistan played their first-ever international cricket match in Pakistan.
- Mehidy Hasan (Ban) scored his 1000th runs in ODIs.
- As a result of this match, Bangladesh qualified for the Super Four.

5 September 2023
14:30 (PST) (D/N)
Scorecard

Sri Lanka; 291/8 (50 overs)	v	Afghanistan; 289 (37.4 overs)
Kusal Mendis 92 (84); Gulbadin Naib 4/60 (10 overs)		Mohammad Nabi 65 (32); Kasun Rajitha 4/79 (10 overs)

Sri Lanka won by 2 runs
Gaddafi Stadium, Lahore
Umpires: Asif Yaqoob (Pak) and Chris Gaffaney (NZ)
Player of the match: Kusal Mendis (SL)

- Sri Lanka won the toss and elected to bat.
- Mohammad Nabi (Afg) scored fastest fifty (24 balls) for Afghanistan in ODIs.
- As the result of this match, Sri Lanka qualified for the Super Four and Afghanistan were eliminated.

== Super Four ==
As tournament organisers, the Pakistan Cricket Board announced that 11 September would be a reserve day for the Super Four clash between India and Pakistan. If the reserve day is triggered, the match will continue on 11 September from the point it was suspended.

India became the first team to qualify for the final after they beat Sri Lanka by 41 runs on 12 September. They made the tournament's final for the tenth time. Two days later, Sri Lanka made their 12th final, 11th in the ODI format of the tournament, after they defeated Pakistan by two wickets in a rain-disrupted match.

=== Points table ===
Pos	Team	Pld	W	L	NR	Pts	NRR
1	India	3	2	1	0	4	1.759
2	Sri Lanka	3	2	1	0	4	−0.134
3	Bangladesh	3	1	2	0	2	−0.469
4	Pakistan	3	1	2	0	2	−1.283

Source: ESPNcricinfo

Advanced to the Final

=== Fixtures ===
6 September 2023
14:30 (PST) (D/N)
Scorecard

Bangladesh; 193 (38.4 overs)	v	Pakistan; 194/3 (39.3 overs)
Mushfiqur Rahim 64 (87); Haris Rauf 4/19 (6 overs)		Imam-ul-Haq 78 (84); Shoriful Islam 1/24 (8 overs)

Pakistan won by 7 wickets
Gaddafi Stadium, Lahore
Umpires: Ahmed Shah Pakteen (Afg) and Langton Rusere (Zim)
Player of the match: Haris Rauf (Pak)

- Bangladesh won the toss and elected to bat.
- Haris Rauf (Pak) took his 50th wicket in ODIs.

9 September 2023
15:00 (SLST) (D/N)
Scorecard

Sri Lanka; 257/9 (50 overs)	v	Bangladesh; 236 (48.1 overs)
Sadeera Samarawickrama 93 (72); Hasan Mahmud 3/57 (9 overs)		Towhid Hridoy 82 (97); Dasun Shanaka 3/28 (9 overs)

Sri Lanka won by 21 runs
R. Premadasa Stadium, Colombo
Umpires: Jayaraman Madanagopal (Ind) and Paul Wilson (Aus)
Player of the match: Sadeera Samarawickrama (SL)

- Bangladesh won the toss and elected to field.
- As the result of this match, Bangladesh were eliminated.

10–11 September 2023
15:00 (SLST) (D/N)
Scorecard

India; 356/2 (50 overs)	v	Pakistan; 128 (32 overs)
Virat Kohli 122* (94); Shadab Khan 1/71 (10 overs)		Fakhar Zaman 27 (50); Kuldeep Yadav 5/25 (8 overs)

India won by 228 runs
R. Premadasa Stadium, Colombo
Umpires: Chris Gaffaney (NZ) and Ruchira Palliyaguruge (SL)
Player of the match: Virat Kohli (Ind)

- Pakistan won the toss and elected to field.
- Due to persistent rain during India's innings. The remaining part of the match was played on reserve day 11 September.
- Virat Kohli (Ind) scored his 13,000th run in ODIs.
- K. L. Rahul (Ind) scored his 2,000th run in ODIs.
- Virat Kohli scored quickest 13000 runs in terms of innings (267).
- Virat Kohli and K.L. Rahul scored the highest partnership for any wicket against Pakistan in ODI.
- India equalled its highest score vs Pakistan in ODIs. This was also the joint highest score in ODIs between the two teams.
- This was India's largest victory in terms of runs in ODI against Pakistan.

12 September 2023
15:00 (SLST) (D/N)
Scorecard

India; 213 (49.1 overs)	v	Sri Lanka; 172 (41.3 overs)
Rohit Sharma 53 (48); Dunith Wellalage 5/40 (10 overs)		Dunith Wellalage 42* (46); Kuldeep Yadav 4/43 (9.3 overs)

India won by 41 runs
R. Premadasa Stadium, Colombo
Umpires: Masudur Rahman (Ban) and Richard Illingworth (Eng)
Player of the match: Dunith Wellalage (SL)

- India won the toss and elected to bat.
- Rohit Sharma (Ind) scored his 10,000th run in ODIs.
- Dunith Wellalage (SL) took his first five-wicket haul in ODIs.
- As the result of this match, India qualified for the final.

14 September 2023
15:00 (SLST) (D/N)
Scorecard

Pakistan; 252/7 (42 overs)	v	Sri Lanka; 252/8 (42 overs)
Mohammad Rizwan 86* (73); Matheesha Pathirana 3/65 (8 overs)		Kusal Mendis 91 (87); Iftikhar Ahmed 3/50 (8 overs)

Sri Lanka won by 2 wickets (DLS method)
R. Premadasa Stadium, Colombo
Umpires: Ahmed Shah Pakteen (Afg) and Langton Rusere (Zim)
Player of the match: Kusal Mendis (SL)

- Pakistan won the toss and elected to bat.
- The match was reduced to 42 overs per side.
- Rain stop play after 42 overs in pakistan innings. Srilanka were set a revised target of 252 runs in 42 overs.
- Zaman Khan (Pak) made his ODI debut.
- As a result of this match, Sri Lanka qualified for the final and Pakistan were eliminated.

15 September 2023
15:00 (SLST) (D/N)
Scorecard

Bangladesh; 265/8 (50 overs)	v	India; 259 (49.5 overs)
Shakib Al Hasan 80 (85); Shardul Thakur 3/65 (10 overs)		Shubman Gill 121 (133); Mustafizur Rahman 3/50 (8 overs)

Bangladesh won by 6 runs
R. Premadasa Stadium, Colombo
Umpires: Asif Yaqoob (Pak) and Richard Illingworth (Eng)
Player of the match: Shakib Al Hasan (Ban)

- India won the toss and elected to field.
- Tanzim Hasan Sakib (Ban) and Tilak Varma (Ind) both made their ODI debuts.
- Ravindra Jadeja (Ind) took his 200th wicket in ODIs.
- Mustafizur Rahman (Ban) became the quickest bowler for Bangladesh to reach 150 wickets in ODIs in terms of matches (91), surpassing Abdur Razzak (108).

== Final ==
17 September 2023
15:00 (SLST) (D/N)
Scorecard

Sri Lanka; 50 (15.2 overs)	v	India; 51/0 (6.1 overs)
Kusal Mendis 17 (34); Mohammed Siraj 6/21 (7 overs)		Shubman Gill 27* (19)

India won by 10 wickets
R. Premadasa Stadium, Colombo
Umpires: Richard Illingworth (Eng) and Ahmed Shah Pakteen (Afg)
Player of the match: Mohammed Siraj (Ind)

- Sri Lanka won the toss and elected to bat.
- Rohit Sharma (Ind) played his 250th ODI.
- Mohammed Siraj (Ind) became the second quickest bowler to reach 50 ODI wickets in terms of balls bowled (1,002). He picked his first five-wicket haul in ODIs, which was the joint quickest in terms of balls bowled (16). He also claimed four wickets in an over, the first Indian bowler to do so in ODIs.
- Sri Lanka's 50 was their second lowest total in ODIs, and the lowest by any team in Asia Cup tournaments, It was also their shortest completed innings in ODIs in terms of balls faced (92), and fifth overall.
- This was India's highest margin of victory in ODIs, in terms of balls remaining (263).

== Statistics ==
=== Most runs ===
The top five highest run scorers (total runs) in the tournament are included in this table.

Player	Runs	Innings	NO	Average	SR	HS	100	50	4s	6s
(India) Shubman Gill	302	6	2	75.50	93.49	121	1	2	35	6
(Sri Lanka) Kusal Mendis	270	6	0	45.00	85.71	92	0	3	27	5
(Sri Lanka) Sadeera Samarawickrama	215	6	0	35.83	89.21	93	0	2	19	2
(Pakistan) Babar Azam	207	4	0	51.75	97.64	151	1	0	20	4
(Pakistan) Mohammad Rizwan	195	4	2	97.50	94.20	86*	0	2	19	3

=== Most wickets ===
The top seven wicket-takers in the tournament are included in this table.

Player	Wickets	Innings	Runs	Overs	BBI	Econ.	Ave.	5WI
(Sri Lanka) Matheesha Pathirana	11	6	270	40.5	4/32	6.61	24.54	0
(India) Mohammed Siraj	10	4	122	26.2	6/21	4.63	12.20	1
(Sri Lanka) Dunith Wellalage	10	6	179	42.0	5/40	4.26	17.90	1
(Pakistan) Shaheen Afridi	10	5	235	41.00	4/35	5.73	23.50	0
(India) Kuldeep Yadav	9	4	103	28.3	5/25	3.61	11.44	1
(Pakistan) Haris Rauf	9	4	120	25.00	4/19	4.80	13.33	0
(Bangladesh) Taskin Ahmed	9	4	172	33.3	4/44	5.13	19.11	0

== Broadcasting ==
This is the list of channels for the Indian subcontinent only.

Territory	Rights holder(s)
Afghanistan	Ariana Television Network
Bangladesh	Gazi TV; BTV National
India	Star Sports
Nepal	Star Sports
Pakistan	PTV Sports; Ten Sports
Sri Lanka	TV 1
