= 2023 Asia Cup final =

Cricket tournament in Sri Lanka

2023 Asia Cup Final
- Event: 2023 Asia Cup
Sri Lanka	India
(Sri Lanka)	(India)
50	51/0
15.2 overs	6.1 overs
- India won by 10 wickets
- Date: 17 September 2023
- Venue: R. Premadasa Stadium, Colombo
- Player of the match: Mohammed Siraj (Ind)
- Umpires: Richard Illingworth (Eng) and Ahmed Shah Pakteen (Afg)

The 2023 Asia Cup Final was the final of the 2023 Asia Cup, a One Day International cricket tournament, and was played on 17 September 2023 in Colombo. Sri Lanka were the defending champions. India beat Sri Lanka by 10 wickets to win their eighth title. Sri Lanka's total of 50 is the lowest total in any ODI tournament final.

== Background ==
In June 2020, following a meeting with the Asian Cricket Council (ACC), the Pakistan Cricket Board (PCB) said they would be willing to let Sri Lanka host the 2020 Asia Cup, with India unwilling to travel to Pakistan. The ACC issued a press release following the meeting stating that "in light of the impact and consequences of the COVID-19 pandemic, possible venue options for the Asia Cup 2020 were discussed and it was decided to take the final decision in due course". In July 2020, an official announcement of the postponement was made by the ACC. The 2020 edition was rescheduled to take place in Sri Lanka in June 2021.

In March 2021, the tournament was at risk of a further postponement after India qualified for the final of the World Test Championship, which clashed with the proposed dates in June. The tournament postponed once again to 2023. In May 2021, the ACC announced that the 2021 tournament would be deferred to 2023, citing that it would be difficult to schedule the tournament due to the continued impact of COVID-19 on the scheduling of other cricket events. Pakistan was scheduled to host the 2022 Asia Cup after retaining the rights to host the 2022 edition. However, in October 2021, following a meeting with the ACC, Ramiz Raja confirmed that Pakistan would host the tournament in 2023, with Sri Lanka hosting the 2022 edition.

In October 2022, the Board of Control for Cricket in India (BCCI) secretary and ACC President Jay Shah said that India would not travel to Pakistan with the ongoing political tension between the two countries. Despite Pakistan being confirmed as hosts earlier, he stated that "the Asia Cup 2023 will be held at a neutral venue." In reply to this statement, the Pakistan Cricket Board (PCB) requested for an emergency meeting of the ACC board to discuss "this important and sensitive matter". The PCB said that this statement could impact on Pakistan's participation in the 2023 CWC and other ICC events in India in the 2024–2031 cycle.

In December 2022, the then PCB chairman Ramiz Raja informed that Pakistan might consider pulling out of this tournament if their hosting rights are withdrawn because of India's unwillingness to travel to Pakistan. However, in January 2023, ACC confirmed the teams and groups of the tournament, with both India and Pakistan taking part.

In March 2023, it was proposed Pakistan remain as hosts and all India matches including at least two India-Pakistan contests to be played at a neutral venue yet to be confirmed. The hybrid model proposed by Pakistan was rejected by Sri Lanka and Bangladesh. In response, PCB Chairman Najam Sethi proposed two options. The first option was that India play all their matches at a neutral venue with Pakistan hosting the rest of the teams. The second option was that four matches in the group stage take place in Pakistan whereas the second phase, in which matches played by the Indian team followed by the next stage matches including the final, be played at a neutral venue. Sri Lanka and Bangladesh agreed to the second option.

On 15 June 2023, the Asian Cricket Council announced that the tournament will be hosted in a hybrid model with four matches being held in Pakistan, and the remaining nine matches being played in Sri Lanka.

== Road to the final ==
India
Titles
Sri Lanka
Opponent
Result
Group Stage
Opponent
Result
Pakistan
No Result
Match 1
Bangladesh
Won
Nepal
Won
Match 2
Afghanistan
Won
Group A table

Pos	Team	Pld	Pts
1	Pakistan (H)	2	3
2	India	2	3
3	Nepal	2	0

Source: ESPNcricinfo
(H) Host

Advances to Super Four

Final standings
Group B table

Pos	Team	Pld	Pts
1	Sri Lanka (H)	2	4
2	Bangladesh	2	2
3	Afghanistan	2	0

Source: ESPNcricinfo
(H) Host

Advances to Super Four

Opponent
Result
Super Four
Opponent
Result
Pakistan
Won
Match 1
Bangladesh
Won
Sri Lanka
Won
Match 2
India
Lost
Bangladesh
Lost
Match 3
Pakistan
Won
Super Four Table

Pos	Team	Pld	W	L	NR	Pts	NRR
1	India	3	2	1	0	4	1.759
2	Sri Lanka	3	2	1	0	4	−0.134
3	Bangladesh	3	1	2	0	2	−0.469
4	Pakistan	3	1	2	0	2	−1.283

Source: ESPNcricinfo

Advanced to the Final

== Venue ==
The Asia Cup 2023 final was held at the R. Premadasa Stadium in Colombo, Sri Lanka, on 17 September 2023. It has a capacity of 35,000. Sri Lanka Cricket through a press release informed that all the tickets were sold out and advised the spectators not to rush in front of ticket counters for new tickets.

== Match ==
=== Match officials ===
- On-field umpires: Richard Illingworth (Eng) and Ahmed Shah Pakteen (Afg)
- Third umpire: Chris Gaffaney (NZ)
- Reserve umpire: Jayaraman Madanagopal (Ind)
- Match referee: David Boon (Aus)
- Toss: Sri Lanka won the toss and elected to bat.

=== Summary ===
17 September 2023
15:00 (SLST) (D/N)
Scorecard

Sri Lanka; 50 (15.2 overs)	v	India; 51/0 (6.1 overs)
Kusal Mendis 17 (34); Mohammed Siraj 6/21 (7 overs)		Shubman Gill 27* (19)

India won by 10 wickets
R. Premadasa Stadium, Colombo
Umpires: Richard Illingworth (Eng) and Ahmed Shah Pakteen (Afg)
Player of the match: Mohammed Siraj (Ind)

- Sri Lanka won the toss and elected to bat.
- Rohit Sharma (Ind) played his 250th ODI.
- Mohammed Siraj (Ind) took his 50th wicket in ODIs.
- Mohammed Siraj (Ind) took his first five-wicket haul in ODIs and his best ODI figures, and also became the first Indian bowler to take 4 wickets in an over in ODI history.

=== Scorecard ===
Source: ESPNcricinfo

Sri Lanka batting
Player	Status	Runs	Balls	4s	6s	Strike rate
Pathum Nissanka	c Jadeja b Siraj	2	4	0	0	50.00
Kusal Perera	c †Rahul b Bumrah	0	2	0	0	0.00
Kusal Mendis	b Siraj	17	34	3	0	50.00
Sadeera Samarawickrama	lbw b Siraj	0	2	0	0	0.00
Charith Asalanka	c Kishan b Siraj	0	1	0	0	0.00
Dhananjaya de Silva	c †Rahul b Siraj	4	2	1	0	200.00
Dasun Shanaka	b Siraj	0	4	0	0	0.00
Dunith Wellalage	c †Rahul b Pandya	8	21	0	0	38.09
Dushan Hemantha	not out	13	15	1	0	86.66
Pramod Madushan	c Kohli b Pandya	1	6	0	0	16.66
Matheesha Pathirana	c Kishan b Pandya	0	1	0	0	0.00
Extras	(lb 2, w 3)	5				
Total	15.2 overs	50	92	5	0	3.26 (run rate)

India bowling
Bowler	Overs	Maidens	Runs	Wickets	Economy
Jasprit Bumrah	5	1	23	1	4.60
Mohammed Siraj	7	1	21	6	3.00
Hardik Pandya	2.2	0	3	3	1.28
Kuldeep Yadav	1	0	1	0	1.00

Fall of wickets: 1/1 (K. Perera, 0.3 ov), 8/2 (Nissanka, 3.1 ov), 8/3 (Samarawickrama, 3.3 ov), 8/4 (Asalanka, 3.4 ov), 12/5 (D. de Silva, 3.6 ov), 12/6 (Shanaka, 5.4 ov), 33/7 (K. Mendis, 11.2 ov), 40/8 (Wellalage, 12.3 ov), 50/9 (Madushan, 15.1 ov), 50/10 (Pathirana, 15.2 ov)

India batting
Player	Status	Runs	Balls	4s	6s	Strike rate
Ishan Kishan	not out	23	18	3	0	127.77
Shubman Gill	not out	27	19	6	0	142.10
Rohit Sharma						
Virat Kohli						
K. L. Rahul						
Hardik Pandya						
Ravindra Jadeja						
Washington Sundar						
Jasprit Bumrah						
Kuldeep Yadav						
Mohammed Siraj						
Extras	(lb 1)	1				
Total	6.1 overs	51/0	37	9	0	8.27 (run rate)

Sri Lanka bowling
Bowler	Overs	Maidens	Runs	Wickets	Economy
Pramod Madushan	2	0	21	0	10.50
Matheesha Pathirana	2	0	21	0	10.50
Dunith Wellalage	2	0	7	0	3.50
Charith Asalanka	0.1	0	1	0	6.00
