= Atomberg =

Indian manufacturer of home appliances

Atomberg Technologies Limited
- Type: Public
- Industry: Consumer appliances
- Founded: 2012; 14 years ago
- Founders: Manoj Kumar Meena; Sibabrata Das
- Headquarters: Mumbai, Maharashtra, India
- Key people: Manoj Kumar Meena (chairman and managing director); Sibabrata Das (CEO)
- Subsidiaries: Atomberg Innovation
- Website: www.atomberg.com

Atomberg Technologies Limited is an Indian manufacturer of home appliances headquartered in Mumbai, Maharashtra. Founded in 2012 by Manoj Kumar Meena, with Sibabrata Das later joining in 2013, the company began selling ceiling fans built around a brushless DC electric motor (BLDC) in 2015 and later expanded into mixer grinders, smart locks and water purifiers.

== History ==
Manoj Kumar Meena, a graduate of IIT Bombay, founded the company in 2012, and Sibabrata Das joined as co-founder in 2013. In 2015 the founders launched a ceiling fan under the Gorilla brand, which the company said consumed about 28 watts, compared with 75 to 80 watts for a typical induction-motor fan. The company sold initially to business customers before moving into retail and e-commerce.

The product range later included pedestal and wall fans and mixer grinders, manufactured at Chakan, Pune.

In 2026, Sibabrata Das became chief executive officer and Manoj Kumar Meena became chairman and managing director.

== Products ==
Atomberg's fans, sold under the Gorilla and Renesa lines, use the company's own BLDC motor technology, which it says consumes less power than conventional induction motors. The company entered kitchen appliances with mixer grinders in 2022, and later added smart locks and water purifiers.
