= 1990 Austral-Asia Cup =

International cricket tournament

- Cricket format: One Day International
- Tournament format(s): Round robin and Knockout
- Host: United Arab Emirates
- Champions: Pakistan (2nd title)
- Runners-up: Australia
- Participants: 6
- Matches: 9
- Player of the series: (Pakistan) Waqar Younis
- Most runs: (India) M Azharuddin (186)
- Most wickets: (Pakistan) Waqar Younis (17)

The 1990 Austral-Asia Cup was a cricket tournament held in Sharjah, UAE, between April 25–May 4, 1990. Six national teams took part: Australia, Bangladesh, India, New Zealand, Pakistan and Sri Lanka.

The teams were divided into two groups of three who played each other, round robin, with the winner and runner-up of each group progressing to the semi-finals.

Pakistan, who were the defending champions, won the tournament, defeating Australia in the final and winning the US$30,000 champions' purse. As runners-up, Australia won US$20,000, while the semi-finalists, New Zealand and Sri Lanka won US$10,000 each. India, the losing finalist from the previous edition of the tournament, were eliminated in the group stage after being beaten by Pakistan and Sri Lanka in its two group matches.

The tournament was sponsored by Sanyo.

== Group stage ==
=== Group A ===
Team	P	W	L	T	NR	RR	Points
Australia	2	2	0	0	0	5.260	4
New Zealand	2	1	1	0	0	5.330	2
Bangladesh	2	0	2	0	0	3.110	0

26 April 1990
Scorecard
Wisden report

Australia; 258/5 (50 overs)	v	New Zealand; 195/7 (50 overs)
DC Boon 92* (93); MC Snedden 2/31 (10 overs)		MD Crowe 41 (74); AR Border 3/25 (6 overs)

Australia won by 63 runs
Sharjah Cricket Stadium, Sharjah, UAE
Umpires: RB Gupta (IND) and Khizer Hayat (PAK)
Player of the match: DC Boon (AUS)

- New Zealand won the toss and elected to field.
- JP Millmow and MW Priest (both NZ) made their ODI debuts.

28 April 1990
Scorecard
Wisden report

New Zealand; 338/4 (50 overs)	v	Bangladesh; 177/5 (50 overs)
JG Wright 93 (98); AH Jones 93 (72); Minhajul Abedin 2/39 (7 overs)		Azhar Hossain 54 (126); JP Millmow 2/41 (10 overs)

New Zealand won by 161 runs
Sharjah Cricket Stadium, Sharjah, UAE
Umpires: RB Gupta (IND) and Khizer Hayat (PAK)
Player of the match: AH Jones (NZ)

- New Zealand won the toss and elected to bat.
- Enamul Haque (BAN) made his ODI debut.

30 April 1990
Scorecard
Wisden report

Bangladesh; 134/8 (50 overs)	v	Australia; 140/3 (25.4 overs)
Aminul Islam 41 (76); Steve Waugh 2/22 (10 overs); PL Taylor 2/22 (10 overs)		PL Taylor 54* (47); Minhajul Abedin 2/43 (6 overs)

Australia won by 7 wickets
Sharjah Cricket Stadium, Sharjah, UAE
Umpires: RB Gupta (IND) and Khizer Hayat (PAK)
Player of the match: PL Taylor (AUS)

- Bangladesh won the toss and elected to bat.
- Jahangir Alam Talukdar made his ODI debut.

=== Group B ===
Team	P	W	L	T	NR	RR	Points
Pakistan	2	2	0	0	0	5.460	4
Sri Lanka	2	1	1	0	0	4.661	2
India	2	0	2	0	0	4.500	0

25 April 1990
Scorecard
Wisden report

India; 241/8 (50 overs)	v	Sri Lanka; 242/7 (49.2 overs)
M Azharuddin 108 (116); JR Ratnayeke 3/31 (10 overs)		A Ranatunga 85* (77); SK Sharma 2/63 (10 overs)

Sri Lanka won by 3 wickets
Sharjah Cricket Stadium, Sharjah, UAE
Umpires: BL Aldridge (NZ) and AR Crafter (AUS)
Player of the match: A Ranatunga (SL)

- Sri Lanka won the toss and elected to field.
- A Kumble (IND) made his ODI debut.

27 April 1990
Scorecard
Wisden report

Pakistan; 235/9 (50 overs)	v	India; 209 (46.3 overs)
Saleem Yousuf 62 (90); RJ Shastri 2/36 (10 overs)		M Azharuddin 78* (95); Waqar Younis 4/42 (10 overs)

Pakistan won by 26 runs
Sharjah Cricket Stadium, Sharjah, UAE
Umpires: BL Aldridge (NZ) and AR Crafter (AUS)
Player of the match: Waqar Younis (PAK)

- India won the toss and elected to field.
- Sajjad Akbar (PAK) made his ODI debut.

29 April 1990
Scorecard
Wisden report

Pakistan; 311/8 (50 overs)	v	Sri Lanka; 221 (47.4 overs)
Ijaz Ahmed 89 (64); JR Ratnayeke 3/65 (10 overs)		DSBP Kuruppu 41 (61); Waqar Younis 6/26 (10 overs)

Pakistan won by 90 runs
Sharjah Cricket Stadium, Sharjah, UAE
Umpires: BL Aldridge (NZ) and AR Crafter (AUS)
Player of the match: Ijaz Ahmed (PAK)

- Sri Lanka won the toss and elected to field.
- Mansoor Rana (PAK) made his ODI debut.

== Knockout stage ==
Semi-finals
1 May
New Zealand	74
Pakistan	77/2
2 May
Australia	332/3
Sri Lanka	218

Final
4 May
Pakistan	266/7
Australia	230

=== Semi-finals ===
1 May 1990
Scorecard
Wisden report

New Zealand; 74 (31.1 overs)	v	Pakistan; 77/2 (15.4 overs)
AH Jones 47 (85); Waqar Younis 5/20 (9 overs)		Saleem Malik 31* (46); JP Millmow 2/22 (5 overs)

Pakistan won by 8 wickets
Sharjah Cricket Stadium, Sharjah, UAE
Umpires: AR Crafter (AUS) and RB Gupta (IND)
Player of the match: Waqar Younis (PAK)

- New Zealand won the toss and elected to bat.

2 May 1990
Scorecard
Wisden report

Australia; 332/3 (50 overs)	v	Sri Lanka; 218 (45.4 overs)
DM Jones 117 (123); MAWR Madurasinghe 1/32 (10 overs)		HP Tillakaratne 76 (109); PL Taylor 2/28 (10 overs)

Australia won by 114 runs
Sharjah Cricket Stadium, Sharjah, UAE
Umpires: BL Aldridge (NZ) and Khizer Hayat (PAK)
Player of the match: SP O'Donnell (AUS)

- Australia won the toss and elected to bat.

=== Final ===
4 May 1990
Scorecard
Wisden report

Pakistan; 266/7 (50 overs)	v	Australia; 230 (46.5 overs)
Saleem Malik 87 (104); CG Rackemann 3/49 (10 overs)		SR Waugh 64 (83); Wasim Akram 3/45 (8.5 overs)

Pakistan won by 36 runs
Sharjah Cricket Stadium, Sharjah, UAE
Umpires: BL Aldridge (NZ) and RB Gupta (IND)
Player of the match: Wasim Akram (PAK)

- Pakistan won the toss and elected to bat.

== See also ==
- Austral-Asia Cup
