= History of the Pakistan national cricket team =

The Pakistan cricket team made its Test cricket debut in 1952 and has since become one of the most successful teams in modern cricket. The team reached the semi-finals of the 1979, 1983, 1987 and 2011 Cricket World Cups, and finals in 1992 and 1999, and won the 1992 World Cup by defeating England in the final under the captaincy of Imran Khan. They are one of the most successful T20 having won the T20 World Cup in 2009 and being the runner-up in 2007. They won the 2017 ICC Champions Trophy by defeating India in the final at The Oval. Pakistan has also been ranked as Number 1 across all formats (Test, ODI and T20) at various points.

== Past history ==
Pakistan cricket had an inauspicious start and at the time of independence in 1947, it was much different to how it is today. Cricket was very thinly spread across the country and even in major urban centres of Lahore and Karachi the game was mainly played by the middle classes. It was unknown in Pakistan's rural hinterland. In the Pashtun dominated areas the game was rejected due to its association with British rule. Since the Board of Control for Cricket in India continued to be based in Mumbai, there was no central structure left for cricket in Pakistan. There were also no Test match grounds and no first class cricket competitions. There were only two turf wickets, both in Lahore. While India retained membership of the Imperial Cricket Conference, Pakistan had to start from scratch.

To prevent Pakistani cricketers from drifting away from the game, Justice Alvin Robert Cornelius, the first vice-president of the Board of Control for Cricket in Pakistan sought to attract international teams to Pakistan with great difficulty. West Indies captained by John Goddard were the first cricket team to tour Pakistan during November 1948. They were informed by Lala Amarnath that the Pakistan cricket team is "just a schoolboys' team", a statement that incensed the Pakistani cricket players. Justice Cornelius removed Mohammad Saeed as Pakistan's first captain and replaced him with Abdul Hafeez Kardar.

Pakistan was given Test match status at a meeting of the Imperial Cricket Conference at Lord's Cricket Ground on 28 July 1952 following recommendation by India, which, being the successor state of the British Raj, did not have to go through such a process.

Pakistan's first Test match was played in Delhi in October 1952 as part of a five Test series which India won 2–1. Pakistan made their first tour of England in 1954 and drew the series 1–1 after a memorable victory at The Oval in which fast bowler Fazal Mahmood took 12 wickets. Pakistan's first home Test match was in Dacca in January 1955 against India, after which four more Test matches were played in Bahawalpur, Lahore, Peshawar and Karachi (all five matches in the series were drawn, the first such occurrence in Test history).

=== 1986 Australasia Cup ===
1986 Australasia Cup, played in Sharjah, is remembered as a famous last-ball victory for Pakistan against arch-rivals India, with Javed Miandad emerging as a national hero.

India batted first and set a target of 245 runs, leaving Pakistan with a required run rate of 4.92 runs per over. Javed Miandad came in to bat at number 3, and Pakistan lost wickets at regular intervals. Later recalling the match, Miandad stated that his main focus was to lose with dignity. With 31 runs needed in the last three overs, Miandad hit a string of boundaries while batting with his team's lower order, until four runs were required from the last delivery of the match. Miandad received a leg side full toss from Chetan Sharma, which he hit for six over the midwicket boundary.

=== 1992 World Cup semi final ===
The 1992 Cricket World Cup was held in Australia and New Zealand. In the semi final, after winning the toss, New Zealand chose to bat first and ended with a total of 262. Pakistan batted conservatively yet lost wickets at regular intervals. With the departure of Imran Khan and Saleem Malik shortly thereafter, Pakistan still required 115 runs at a rate of 7.67 per over with veteran Javed Miandad being the only known batsman remaining at the crease. A young Inzamam-ul-Haq, who had just turned 22 and was not a well-known player at the time, burst onto the international stage with a match-winning 60 off 37 balls. Once Inzamam got out, Pakistan required 36 from 30 balls, which wicketkeeper Moin Khan ended with a towering six over long off, followed by the winning boundary to midwicket. The match is seen as the emergence of Inzamam onto the international stage.

=== 1992 World Cup victory ===
The 1992 Cricket World Cup marked Pakistan's first World Cup victory. It is remembered for the comeback Pakistan made after losing key players such as Waqar Younis and Saeed Anwar, and being led by an injured captain Imran Khan. Pakistan won only 1 of their first 5 matches including a 1 no-result and were nearly eliminated in the first round of the tournament after being bowled out for 74 against England, until the match was declared as a "no result" due to rain. Captain Imran Khan famously told the team to play as "cornered tigers", after which Pakistan won five successive matches, including, most famously, the semi-final against hosts New Zealand and the final against England.

=== 2007 World Cup shock ===
Pakistan participated in one of the biggest upsets in World Cup History when they were knocked out of the competition in a shock defeat to Ireland, who were playing in their first competition. Pakistan, needing to win to qualify for the next stage after losing to the West Indies in their opening match, were put into bat by Ireland on a green pitch. They lost wickets regularly and only 4 batsmen crossed double figures. In the end they were bowled out by the resurgent Irish for 132. The Irish went on to win the match, helped by a knock of 72 from Niall O'Brien. This meant that Pakistan had been knocked out during the first round for the second consecutive World Cup.

Tragedy struck the team when coach Bob Woolmer died one day later on 18 March 2007 in a hospital in Kingston, Jamaica. Jamaican police spokesman, Karl Angell, reported on 23 March 2007 that, "Mr Woolmer's death was due to asphyxiation as a result of manual strangulation", and that, "Mr Woolmer's death is now being treated by the Jamaica police as a case of murder."

Subsequent to his team's defeat and the death of Bob Woolmer, Inzamam-ul-Haq announced his resignation as captain of the team and his retirement from one-day cricket, stating that he would continue to take part in Test cricket but not as captain.

On 23 March 2007, Pakistan players and officials were questioned by Jamaican police and submitted DNA samples along with fingerprints, as part of the routine enquiries in the investigation into Woolmer's murder. Three days after leaving the West Indies for Pakistan, via London, the Pakistan team were ruled out as suspects. Mark Shields, the detective in charge of the investigation, announced, "It's fair to say they are now being treated as witnesses." "I have got no evidence to suggest it was anybody in the squad." A memorial service was held in Sacred Heart Church, Lahore, for Bob Woolmer on 1 April 2007. Among the attendees were Pakistan players and dignitaries, including Inzamam-ul-Haq, who was quoted as saying, "After Woolmer's family, the Pakistan team was the most aggrieved by his death." After the World Cup ended, serious doubts were raised about the investigation, with increasing speculation that Woolmer died of natural causes. This has now been accepted as fact, and the case has been closed.

On 16 July 2007, Geoff Lawson, previously head coach of New South Wales, was appointed coach of the Pakistan for two years, becoming the third foreigner to take on the role. In the 2007 ICC World Twenty20, Pakistan exceeded expectations to reach the final but ended as runners-up, after losing the final to India in a nail-biting finish. On 25 October 2008, Intikhab Alam was named as a national coach of the team by the PCB.

=== Player disputes and rebellions ===
The Pakistan team has been marred by player disputes and rebellions within the team on various instances. The first such reported instance was in 1981, when ten players including Imran Khan, Asif Iqbal and Majid Khan refused to play under the captaincy of Javed Miandad.
Once again, in 1992 Miandad was the target of another revolt this time led by Wasim Akram with the support of now retired Imran Khan. This led to Miandad being replaced with Akram. Later in 1993, when Wasim Akram was appointed captain of the national team, players including Waqar Younis and Javed Miandad revolted against him and Akram was removed as captain. Akram did regain captaincy again in 1996 and then again in 1998–99.

In 2009, many senior players revolted against captain Younis Khan when the team was playing in the UAE against New Zealand. Press reports say that a group of eight players led by Shoaib Malik went to the house of former captain Inzamam-ul-Haq, where they swore on the Quran to never play under Younis again. Sensing the direction of the wind, Younis left the team for "rest" and the captaincy was awarded to Mohammad Yousuf. On the subsequent Australian tour, differences between Yousaf and the other players came to the forefront, causing Yousaf to give the captaincy of the fifth ODI to Shahid Afridi. Shoaib Malik, captain the team in the T20 (after Afridi was suspended due to ball tampering), started a tirade against Yousaf. The above-mentioned revolt lead to an operation cleanup within the Pakistan team, when selectors were asked not to consider Younis Khan and Mohammad Yousaf for any future series.

== Tournament history ==
A red box around the year indicates tournaments played within Pakistan

=== ICC World Cup ===
World Cup record
Year	Round	Position	GP	W	L	T	NR
England 1975	Round 1	5/8	3	1	2	0	0
England 1979	Semi-finals	4/8	4	2	2	0	0
England 1983	Semi-finals	4/8	7	3	4	0	0
India and Pakistan 1987	Semi-finals	3/8	7	5	2	0	0
Australia and New Zealand 1992	Champions	1/9	10	6	3	0	1
India, Pakistan and Sri Lanka 1996	Quarter-finals	6/12	6	4	2	0	0
England and Netherlands 1999	Runners-Up	2/12	10	7	3	0	0
South Africa, Zimbabwe and Kenya 2003	Round 1	10/14	6	2	3	0	1
West Indies 2007	Round 1	10/16	3	1	2	0	0
India, Sri Lanka and Bangladesh 2011	Semi-finals	3/14	8	6	2	0	0
Australia and New Zealand 2015	Quarter-finals	5/14	7	4	3	0	0
England 2019	Group stage	5/10	9	5	3	0	1
India 2023	-	–	–	–	–	–	–
Total	12/12	1 Title	80	45	32	0	2

=== ICC World Twenty20 ===
World Twenty20 record
Year	Round	Position	GP	W	L	T	NR
South Africa 2007	Runners-Up	2/12	7	5	1	1	0
England 2009	Champions	1/12	7	5	2	0	0
West Indies 2010	Semi-finals	4/12	6	2	4	0	0
Sri Lanka 2012	Semi-finals	3/12	6	4	2	0	0
Bangladesh 2014	Super 10	5/16	4	2	2	0	0
India 2016	Super 10	7/16	4	1	3	0	0
UAE(Organized by the BCCI) 2021	Semi-finals	3/16	6	5	1	–	–
Total	6/6	1 Title	34	19	14	1	0

=== ICC Champions Trophy ===
Known as the "ICC Knockout" in 1998 and 2000

Champions Trophy record
Year	Round	Position	GP	W	L	T	NR
(Bangladesh) 1998	Quarter-finals	5/9	1	0	1	0	0
(Kenya) 2000	Semi-finals	4/11	2	1	1	0	0
(Sri Lanka) 2002	Group Stage	5/12	2	1	1	0	0
(England) 2004	Semi-finals	4/12	3	2	1	0	0
(India) 2006	Group Stage	6/10	3	1	2	0	0
(South Africa) 2009	Semi-finals	3/8	4	2	2	0	0
(England) 2013	Group Stage	8/8	3	0	3	0	0
(England) 2017	Champions	1/8	5	4	1	0	0
Total	8/8	1 Title	23	11	12	0	0

=== Asia Cup ===
Asia Cup record
Year	Round	Position	GP	W	L	T	NR
(United Arab Emirates) 1984	Group Stage	3/3	2	0	2	0	0
(Sri Lanka) 1986	Runners-up	2/3	3	2	1	0	0
(Bangladesh) 1988	Group Stage	3/4	3	1	2	0	0
(India) 1990–91	Did not participate						
(United Arab Emirates) 1995	Group Stage	3/4	3	2	1	0	0
(Sri Lanka) 1997	Group Stage	3/4	3	1	1	0	1
(Bangladesh) 2000	Champions	1/4	4	4	0	0	0
(Sri Lanka) 2004	Super Fours	3/6	5	4	1	0	0
(Pakistan) 2008	Super Fours	3/6	5	3	2	0	0
(Sri Lanka) 2010	Group Stage	3/4	3	1	2	0	0
(Bangladesh) 2012	Champions	1/4	4	3	1	0	0
(Bangladesh) 2014	Runners-up	2/5	5	3	2	0	0
(Bangladesh) 2016	Group Stage	3/5	4	2	2	0	0
(United Arab Emirates) 2018	Super Fours	3/6	5	2	3	0	0
Total	12/13	2 Titles	49	28	20	0	1

=== Other tournaments ===
Defunct Tournaments
Commonwealth Games	Asian Test Championship	Austral-Asia Cup	World Championship of Cricket
1998: Round 1	1999: Champions; 2001: Runners-Up	1986:Champions; 1990:Champions; 1994:Champions	1985 World Championship of Cricket: Runners-Up

=== Honours ===
Cricket World Cup (1): 1992

ICC World Twenty20 (1): 2009

ICC Champions Trophy (1): 2017

Asia Cup (2): 2000 2012

== See also ==
- Pakistan Under-19 cricket team
- Pakistani national cricket captains
- Pakistan national women's cricket team
- India versus Pakistan cricket rivalry
