= 1988 Asia Cup =

Cricket tournament in Bangladesh

- Wills Asia Cup 1988 logo
- Dates: 27 October – 4 November 1988
- Administrator: Asian Cricket Council
- Cricket format: One Day International
- Tournament format: Round-robin
- Host: Bangladesh
- Champions: India (2nd title)
- Runners-up: Sri Lanka
- Participants: 4
- Matches: 7
- Player of the series: (India) Navjot Sidhu
- Most runs: (Pakistan) Ijaz Ahmed (192)
- Most wickets: (India) Arshad Ayub (9)

The 1988 Asia Cup (also known as the Wills Asia Cup) was the third Asia Cup tournament, held in Bangladesh between 26 October and 4 November 1988. Four teams took part in the tournament: India, Pakistan, Sri Lanka and the host nation Bangladesh. The matches were the first-ever List A-classified being played in Bangladesh, then an Associate Member of the International Cricket Council (ICC), their opponents all being Full Members.

The 1988 Asia Cup was a round-robin tournament where each team played the other three once, and the top two teams qualified for a place in the final. India and Sri Lanka qualified for the final in which India defeated Sri Lanka by 6 wickets to win its second Asia Cup.

== Squads ==
Squads
India	Sri Lanka	Pakistan	Bangladesh
Dilip Vengsarkar (c)	Arjuna Ranatunga (c)	Javed Miandad (c)	Gazi Ashraf (c)
Krishnamachari Srikkanth	Roshan Mahanama	Ramiz Raja	Azhar Hossain
Navjot Singh Sidhu	Brendon Kuruppu (wk)	Aamer Malik	Harunur Rashid
Mohinder Amarnath	Athula Samarasekera	Shoaib Mohammad	Athar Ali Khan
Mohammad Azharuddin	Aravinda de Silva	Saleem Malik	Minhajul Abedin
Kapil Dev	Ranjan Madugalle	Ijaz Ahmed	Aminul Islam
Kiran More (wk)	Duleep Mendis	Saleem Yousuf (wk)	Zahid Razzak
Sanjeev Sharma	Ravi Ratnayeke	Manzoor Elahi	Golam Faruq
Arshad Ayub	Graeme Labrooy	Wasim Akram	Jahangir Shah
Maninder Singh	Kapila Wijegunawardene	Abdul Qadir	Nasir Ahmed (wk)
Narendra Hirwani	Don Anurasiri	Tauseef Ahmed	Gholam Nousher
Ajay Sharma	Hashan Tillakaratne	Moin-ul-Atiq	Faruk Ahmed
Chandrakant Pandit	Ranjith Madurasinghe	Iqbal Qasim	Akram Khan
-	Champaka Ramanayake	Naved Anjum	Wahidul Gani
-	Uvais Karnain	Haafiz Shahid	-

== Venues ==
Dhaka	Chattogram
National Stadium	District Stadium, Chittagong
Capacity: 36,000	Capacity: 20,000
Matches: 5	Matches: 2
1988 Asia Cup is located in Bangladesh

== Matches ==
=== Group stage ===
Pos	Team	Pld	W	L	NR	Pts	NRR	Qualification
1	Sri Lanka	3	3	0	0	12	5.110	Advanced to the Final
2	India	3	2	1	0	8	4.491	Advanced to the Final
3	Pakistan	3	1	2	0	4	4.721	Eliminated
4	Bangladesh (H)	3	0	3	0	0	2.430	Eliminated

Source: ESPN Cricinfo
(H) Host

27 October 1988
Scorecard

Pakistan; 194/7 (44 overs)	v	Sri Lanka; 195/5 (38.5 overs)
Ijaz Ahmed 54 (58); Graeme Labrooy 3/36 (8 overs)		Roshan Mahanama 55 (92); Wasim Akram 2/34 (7.5 overs)

Sri Lanka won by 5 wickets
Bangabandhu National Stadium, Dhaka
Umpires: Ram Gupta (Ind) and V K Ramaswamy (Ind)
Player of the match: Roshan Mahanama (SL)

27 October 1988
Scorecard

Bangladesh; 99/8 (45 overs)	v	India; 100/1 (26 overs)
Minhajul Abedin 22 (67); Arshad Ayub 3/20 (9 overs)		Navjot Sidhu 50* (71); Azhar Hossain 1/30 (7 overs)

India won by 9 wickets
M. A. Aziz Stadium, Chittagong
Umpires: KT Francis (SL) and Tariq Ata (Pak)
Player of the match: Navjot Sidhu (Ind)

29 October 1988
Scorecard

Pakistan; 284/3 (45 overs)	v	Bangladesh; 111/6 (45 overs)
Ijaz Ahmed 124* (87); Azhar Hossain 1/24 (4 overs)		Athar Ali Khan 22 (52); Iqbal Qasim 3/13 (9 overs)

Pakistan won by 173 runs
M. A. Aziz Stadium, Chittagong
Umpires: Ram Gupta (Ind) and Selliah Ponnadurai (SL)
Player of the match: Moin-ul-Atiq (Pak)

29 October 1988
Scorecard

Sri Lanka; 271/6 (45 overs)	v	India; 254 (44 overs)
Aravinda de Silva 69 (63); Kapil Dev 2/39 (9 overs)		Navjot Sidhu 50 (55); Kapila Wijegunawardene 4/49 (9 overs)

Sri Lanka won by 17 runs
Bangabandhu National Stadium, Dhaka
Umpires: Saleem Badar (Pak) and Tariq Ata (Pak)
Player of the match: Aravinda de Silva (SL)

31 October 1988
Scorecard

Pakistan; 142 (42.2 overs)	v	India; 143/6 (40.4 overs)
Moin-ul-Atiq 38 (64); Arshad Ayub 5/21 (9 overs)		Mohinder Amarnath 74* (122); Abdul Qadir 3/27 (9 overs)

India won by 4 wickets
Bangabandhu National Stadium, Dhaka
Umpires: KT Francis (SL) and Selliah Ponnadurai (SL)
Player of the match: Arshad Ayub (Ind)

2 November 1988
Scorecard

Bangladesh; 118/8 (45 overs)	v	Sri Lanka; 120/1 (30.5 overs)
Athar Ali Khan 30 (83); Ravi Ratnayeke 4/23 (8 overs)		Brendon Kuruppu 58* (93); Azhar Hossain 1/20 (6.5 overs)

Sri Lanka won by 9 wickets
Bangabandhu National Stadium, Dhaka
Umpires: V K Ramaswamy (Ind) and Saleem Badar (Pak)
Player of the match: Brendon Kuruppu (SL)

=== Final ===
4 November 1988
Scorecard

Sri Lanka; 176 (43.2 overs)	v	India; 180/4 (37.1 overs)
Duleep Mendis 36 (36); Kris Srikkanth 3/12 (3.2 overs)		Navjot Sidhu 76 (87); Kapila Wijegunawardene 2/33 (9 overs)

India won by 6 wickets
Bangabandhu National Stadium, Dhaka
Umpires: Saleem Badar (Pak) and Tariq Ata (Pak)
Player of the match: Navjot Sidhu (Ind)

== Statistics ==
=== Most runs ===
Player	Matches	Innings	NO	Runs	Average	SR	HS	100	50	0
(Pakistan) Ijaz Ahmed	3	3	1	192	96.00	103.78	124*	1	1	0
(India) Navjot Sidhu	4	4	1	179	59.66	77.82	76	0	3	0
(Pakistan) Moin-ul-Atiq	2	2	0	143	71.50	79.00	105	1	0	0
(Sri Lanka) Athula Samarasekera	4	4	1	140	46.66	75.67	66	0	1	0
(Sri Lanka) Aravinda de Silva	4	3	0	135	45.00	107.14	69	0	1	0
Source: Cricinfo

=== Most wickets ===
Player	Matches	Innings	Wickets	Overs	Ave.	Econ.	BBI	4WI	5WI
(India) Arshad Ayub	4	4	9	36.00	13.33	3.33	5/21	0	1
(Sri Lanka) Kapila Wijegunawardene	4	4	8	32.00	16.50	4.12	4/49	1	0
(Sri Lanka) Ravi Ratnayeke	4	4	7	34.00	18.85	3.88	4/23	1	0
(India) Kapil Dev	4	4	6	28.2	16.50	3.49	2/16	0	0
(Pakistan) Abdul Qadir	3	3	6	26.00	17.00	3.92	3/27	0	0
Source: Cricinfo

== See also ==
- Asia Cup
