= Pakistani cricket team in New Zealand in 1988–89 =

International cricket tour

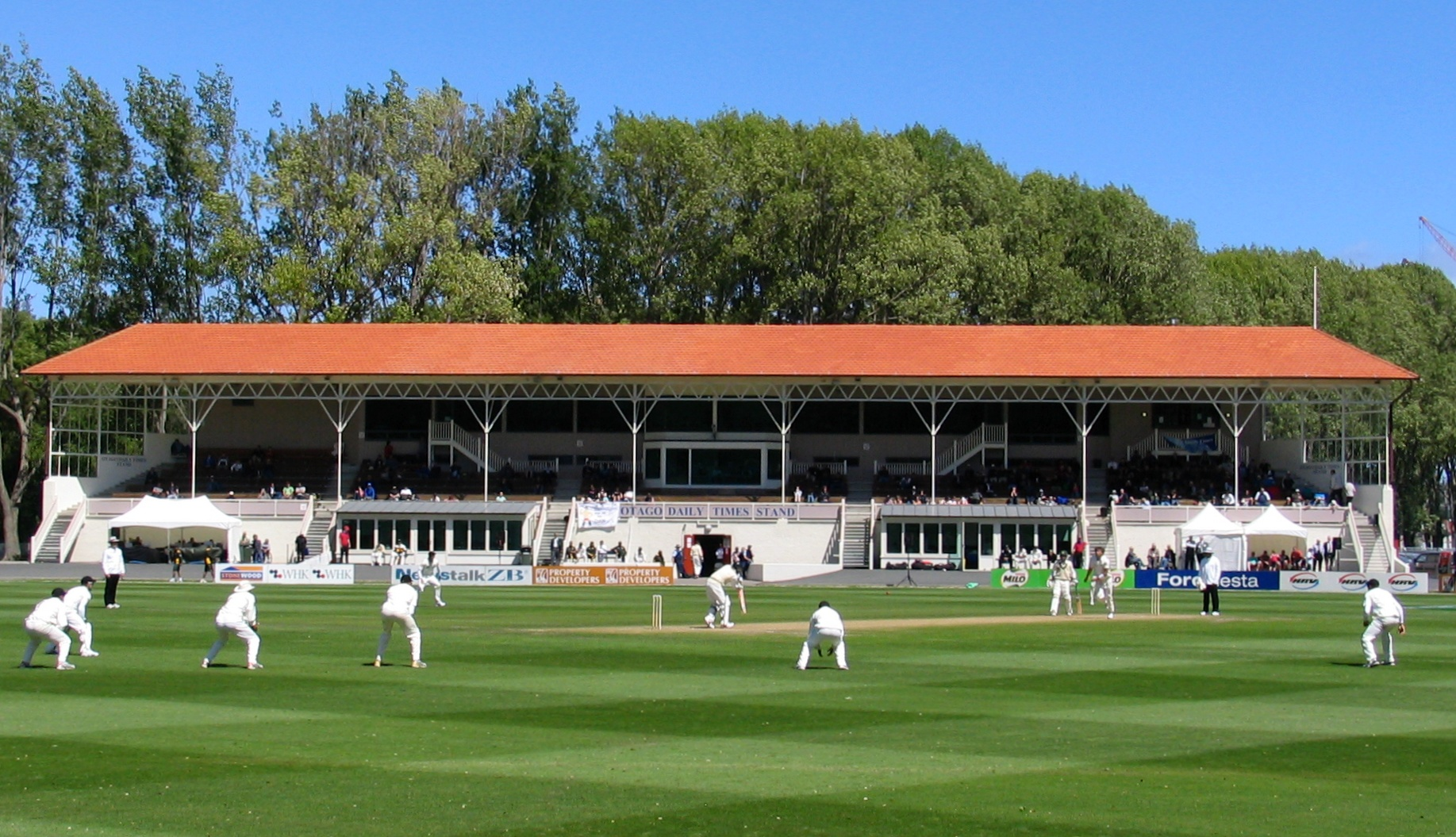
New Zealand vs Pakistan, University Oval

The Pakistan national cricket team toured New Zealand in the 1988–89 season, following its unsuccessful participation in the Benson and Hedges World Series Cup in Australia.

Three Test matches were arranged with four One-day International matches. In the event, the first Test at Dunedin was rained off, and an extra ODI was put on for what would have been the Test's fourth day. The two Tests that were played were both drawn, and New Zealand won four ODIs against one for the Pakistanis.

According to Wisden, the tour was played in some acrimony. The touring side was led by Imran Khan who replaced Javed Miandad at a late stage, and several other players in the originally named touring party were also changed. Once in New Zealand, the tour was beset by umpiring controversies and disputed decisions.

== Touring team ==
- Imran Khan, captain
- Aamer Malik
- Aaqib Javed
- Abdul Qadir
- Ijaz Ahmed
- Javed Miandad
- Moin-ul-Atiq
- Mudassar Nazar
- Ramiz Raja
- Rizwan-uz-Zaman
- Saeed Anwar
- Saleem Jaffar
- Saleem Malik
- Saleem Yousuf
- Shoaib Mohammad
- Sikander Bakht
- Tauseef Ahmed
- Wasim Akram

Mohsin Kamal was part of the team in Australia but left when Saleem Jaffer joined the party in New Zealand.

== Test matches ==
=== First Test match, Carisbrook, Dunedin, 3–7 February 1989 ===
3 – 7 February 1989
(5–day match)
Scorecard

New Zealand	v	Pakistan

Match abandoned
Carisbrook, Dunedin
Umpires: RS Dunne and SJ Woodward

- No toss
- The match was abandoned on the third day. As a replacement, a one-day international was played on 6 February.

Torrential rain forced the match to be called off with no play after three days. The teams had not even tossed. An extra One-day International match was played on what would have been the Test match's fourth day.

=== Second Test match, Basin Reserve, Wellington, 10–14 February 1989 ===
10 – 14 February 1989
(5–day match)
Scorecard

New Zealand	v	Pakistan
447 (169.4 overs); MD Crowe 174 (410); Imran Khan 3/75 (46.4 overs)		438/7d (195 overs); Shoaib Mohammad 163 (516); RJ Hadlee 4/101 (54 overs)
186/8 (61 overs); RH Vance 44 (104); Saleem Jaffar 5/40 (17 overs)

Match drawn
Basin Reserve, Wellington
Umpires: RS Dunne and SJ Woodward
Player of the match: Imran Khan (PAK)

- Pakistan won the toss and elected to field.
- Aaqib Javed (PAK) made his Test debut.

Described by Wisden Cricketers' Almanack as a "dreadfully dull draw", the match was dominated by unadventurous batting from both sides on a bland pitch. Only Andrew Jones escaped Wisden's strictures. His 86 out of 149 on the first was made in just under three-and-a-half hours: "unseemly haste for such a grave occasion", Wisden said. Martin Crowe took just under 10 hours to score 174 and the New Zealand first innings took up the first two days. Pakistan then went even more slowly. Shoaib Mohammad took 12 hours to make 163, then the sixth longest innings of all time anywhere and the longest-ever in New Zealand. Javed Miandad's 118 and Imran Khan's 71 were fast by comparison. After Pakistan declared nine behind on the last morning, New Zealand moved serenely to 107 for one before a collapse in the face of swerve and pace from Imran and Saleem Jaffar, whose five for 40 was his best Test performance. But a result never looked likely.

=== Third Test match, Eden Park, Auckland, 24–28 February 1989 ===
24 – 28 February 1979
(5–day match)
Scorecard

Pakistan	v	New Zealand
616/5d (203 overs); Javed Miandad 271 (465); RJ Hadlee 1/68 (28 overs)		403 (184.1 overs); MD Crowe 78 (194); Abdul Qadir 6/160 (58.1 overs)
		99/3 (f/o) (50.4 overs); JG Wright 36 (116); Mudassar Nazar 2/13 (8 overs)

Match drawn
Eden Park, Auckland
Umpires: BL Aldridge and SJ Woodward
Player of the match: Javed Miandad (PAK)

- Pakistan won the toss and elected to bat.

Another slow Test, but not as slow as Wellington, saw Pakistan amass the highest total ever against a New Zealand side. Shoaib's 112 took six hours, but the highlight was Javed Miandad's 271, made in 558 minutes and his sixth Test double-century. Aamer Malik, Saleem Malik and Imran Khan also contributed useful runs. New Zealand's attack was weakened by injury to Richard Hadlee and Stephen Boock conceded 229 runs, a record for a New Zealand bowler. Imran batted on to lunch on the third day in the hope that the pitch would disintegrate in favour of his spinners. But although Abdul Qadir took six wickets for 160, six New Zealand Batsmen passed 30 and the final total failed only by 14 runs to avoid the follow-on. With rain and bad light intervening, the match petered out to a draw.

== One Day Internationals (ODIs) ==
When the Dunedin Test was washed out, a replacement One-Day International was arranged for the scheduled fourth day of the match. This did not count towards the Rothmans Cup ODI Series.

=== Dunedin Test Replacement ODI ===
6 February 1989
Scorecard

Pakistan; 170/9 (48 overs)	v	New Zealand; 174/2 (46.3 overs)
Saleem Malik 83 (98); RJ Hadlee 5/38 (10 overs)		AH Jones 55* (79); Imran Khan 1/42 (10 overs)

New Zealand won by 8 wickets
Carisbrook, Dunedin
Umpires: RS Dunne and SJ Woodward
Player of the match: RJ Hadlee (NZ)

- New Zealand won the toss and elected to field.

New Zealand won the Rothmans Cup 3–1.

=== 1st ODI ===
4 March 1989
Scorecard

Pakistan; 170/7 (47 overs)	v	New Zealand; 171/3 (40.5 overs)
Rameez Raja 51 (92); DK Morrison 3/44 (10 overs)		AH Jones 62* (129); Saleem Jaffar 2/35 (10 overs)

New Zealand won by 7 wickets
Lancaster Park, Christchurch
Umpires: BL Aldridge and RL McHarg
Player of the match: AH Jones (NZ)

- New Zealand won the toss and elected to field.
- The match was reduced before play started to 47 overs per side.

=== 2nd ODI ===
8 March 1989
Scorecard

Pakistan; 253/6 (50 overs)	v	New Zealand; 254/4 (46.5 overs)
Shoaib Mohammad 126* (155); GK Robertson 2/56 (10 overs)		MD Crowe 87* (95); Tauseef Ahmed 1/35 (8 overs)

New Zealand won by 6 wickets
Basin Reserve, Wellington
Umpires: BL Aldridge and SJ Woodward
Player of the match: Shoaib Mohammad (PAK)

- New Zealand won the toss and elected to field.

=== 3rd ODI ===
11 March 1989
Scorecard

New Zealand; 249 (49.5 overs)	v	Pakistan; 251/3 (48.3 overs)
AH Jones 82 (93); Aaqib Javed 3/48 (10 overs)		Rameez Raja 101 (114); MC Snedden 1/57 (9.3 overs)

Pakistan won by 7 wickets
Eden Park, Auckland
Umpires: RS Dunne and RL McHarg
Player of the match: Rameez Raja (PAK)

- Pakistan won the toss and elected to field.

=== 4th ODI ===
14 March 1989
Scorecard

Pakistan; 138/9 (50 overs)	v	New Zealand; 139/3 (39.4 overs)
Mudassar Nazar 48 (115); DK Morrison 4/33 (10 overs)		AH Jones 63* (120); Imran Khan 2/24 (10 overs)

New Zealand won by 7 wickets
Seddon Park, Hamilton
Umpires: GIJ Cowan and RS Dunne
Player of the match: DK Morrison (NZ)

- New Zealand won the toss and elected to field.
