= 1986 Austral-Asia Cup final =

1986 Austral-Asia Cup Final
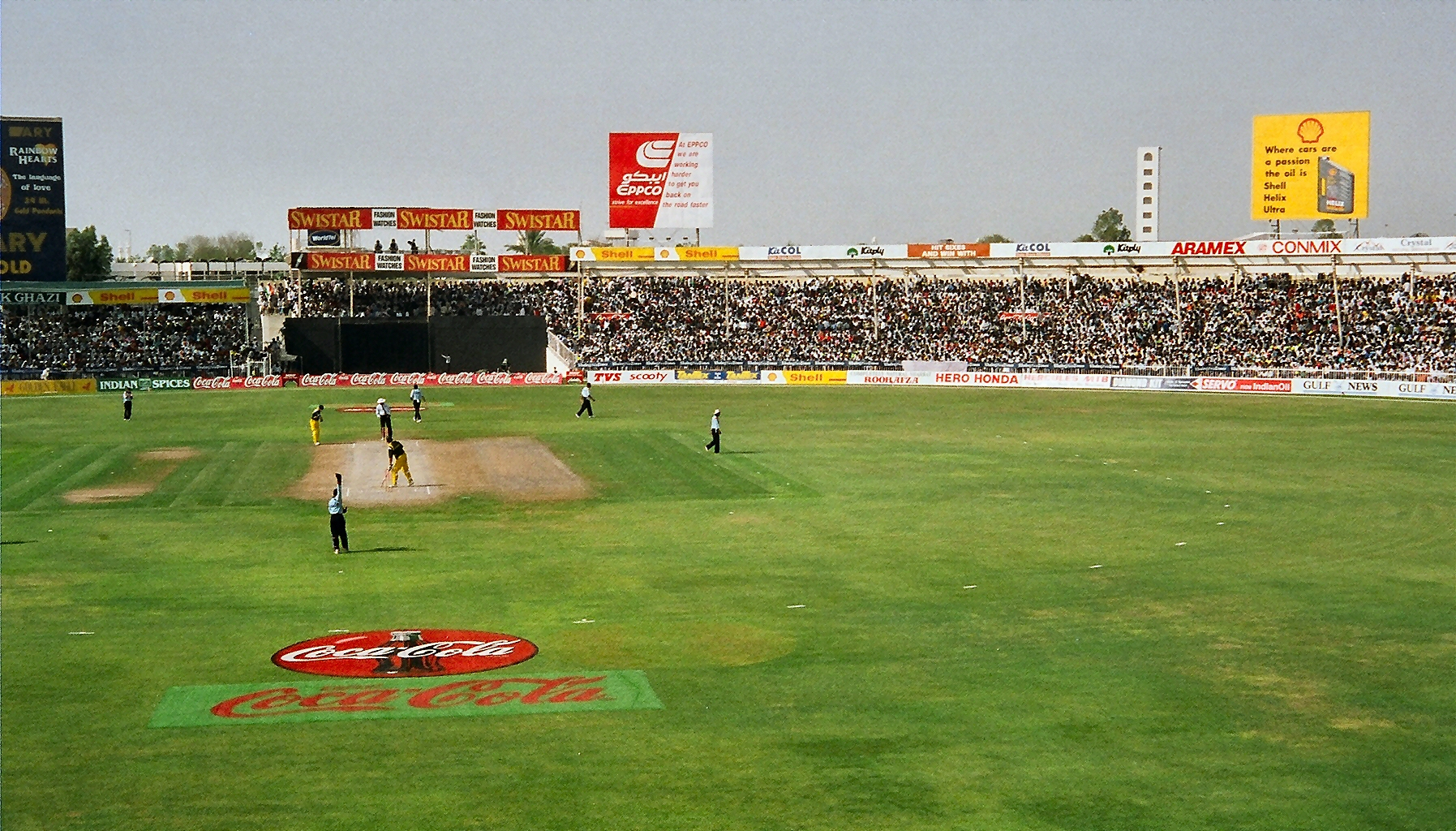
- Sharjah Cricket Ground
- Event: 1986 Austral-Asia Cup
India	Pakistan
(India)	(Pakistan)
245/7	248/9
50 overs	50 overs
- Pakistan won by 1 wicket
- Date: 18 April 1986
- Venue: Sharjah Cricket Stadium, Sharjah
- Player of the match: Javed Miandad
- Umpires: Antonio Gaynor; David Archer

The 1986 Austral-Asia Cup Final was a One Day International (ODI) match played on 18 April 1986 between India and Pakistan at the Sharjah Cricket Stadium, Sharjah. It marked the culmination of the first Austral-Asia Cup and was won by Pakistan who defeated India by one wicket to lift their first ODI trophy.

== Road to the final ==
India reached the final by defeating Sri Lanka by seven wickets, while Pakistan reached the final by defeating New Zealand by ten wickets.

== Details ==
Heading into the match, Pakistani team remained unchanged from their semi-final victory over New Zealand while India made one change with Dilip Vengsarkar replacing Sandeep Patil from their victory over Sri Lanka. Imran Khan won the toss and elected to field first. Openers Krishnamachari Srikkanth and Sunil Gavaskar opened with a 117 run partnership before Krishnamachari Srikkanth attempt for a six was caught by Wasim Akram. Dilip Vengsarkar scored a half-century before being clean bowled by Wasim Akram with the score at 216. The scorecard remained the same as Kirti Azad was sent back by Akram for no score. Kapil Dev struck a boundary before being bowled by Imran Khan, who dismissed Sunil Gavaskar as well, with Gavaskar only being eight runs shy of a century. Later India lost quick wickets of Ravi Shastri and Chetan Sharma and India finished on 245 for 7 from their fifty overs with the last eights overs getting them only 38 runs. For Pakistan, Wasim Akram was the best of the bowlers with three wickets while Imran Khan claimed two wickets.

Chasing the target of 246 to win, Pakistan lost in-form batsman Mudassar Nazar leg before wicket to Chetan Sharma with the total at nine. New man Rameez Raja also couldn't make a good score as he was dismissed by Maninder Singh for ten. Javed Miandad pushed the score slowly along with opener Mohsin Khan. Madan Lal clean bowled Khan for 36 with the scorecard at 61 for 3. Miandad built good partnerships with Saleem Malik and later Abdul Qadir, who made a quick 34, before being caught by substitute fielder Raman Lamba. Still Pakistan were 67 runs away from victory. Imran Khan and Manzoor Elahi perished while going for big hits, but Miandad was moving the score at one end, trying to maintain the asking rate with occasional boundaries and sixes.

At the end of 49th over, Pakistan were 235 for seven and required 11 runs from six balls to win the cup. Chetan Sharma was bowling the 50th over of the match and Miandad struck the first ball to the long-off boundary, but Kapil fielded it and returned the ball quickly and Wasim Akram was run out trying to get the second run. Miandad struck a boundary off the second ball but could score only a single in the third ball, as Roger Binny brilliantly stopped a possible boundary. Wicket-keeper batsman Zuldarnain was clean bowled by Sharma for a duck which left Pakistan needing five runs from two deliveries. Last man Tauseef Ahmed scrambled a single off the fifth ball as Mohammad Azharuddin missed a clean run-out chance. Pakistan needing four runs and India one final wicket from the last ball. Chetan Sharma's intended yorker became a full toss which was dispatched into crowds by Miandad for a six. Pakistan finished on 248 for 9 with Miandad remained unbeaten on 116 as he helped Pakistan to win their maiden One Day trophy. For India, Chetan Sharma was the best of the bowlers with three wickets while Madan Lal claimed two wickets. Javed Miandad was adjudged the man of the match while Sunil Gavaskar was declared the Man of the Series.

== Scorecard ==
India batting
Player	Status	Runs	Balls	4s	6s	Strike rate
Krishnamachari Srikkanth	c Wasim Akram b Abdul Qadir	75	80	8	2	93.75
Sunil Gavaskar	b Imran Khan	92	134	6	0	68.66
Dilip Vengsarkar	b Wasim Akram	50	64	0	1	78.12
Kirti Azad	b Wasim Akram	0	3	0	0	0.00
Kapil Dev *	b Imran Khan	8	8	1	0	100.00
Chetan Sharma	run out	10	10	1	0	100.00
Ravi Shastri	b Wasim Akram	1	2	0	0	50.00
Chandrakant Pandit†	not out	0	2	0	0	0.00
Mohammad Azharuddin						
Madan Lal						
Maninder Singh						
Extras	(lb 6, w 2, nb 1)	9				
Total	(7 wickets; 50 overs)	245				

Fall of wickets: 1–117 (Srikkanth), 2–216 (Vengsarkar), 3–216 (Kirti Azad), 4–229 (Kapil Dev), 5–242 (Sunil Gavaskar), 6–245 (Ravi Shastri), 7–245 (Chetan Sharma)

Pakistan bowling
Bowler	Overs	Maidens	Runs	Wickets	Econ	Wides	NBs
Imran Khan	10	2	40	2	4.00	{{{wides}}}	{{{no-balls}}}
Wasim Akram	10	1	42	3	4.20	{{{wides}}}	{{{no-balls}}}
Manzoor Elahi	5	0	33	0	6.60	{{{wides}}}	{{{no-balls}}}
Mudassar Nazar	5	0	32	0	6.40	{{{wides}}}	{{{no-balls}}}
Abdul Qadir	10	2	49	1	4.90	{{{wides}}}	{{{no-balls}}}
Tauseef Ahmed	10	1	43	0	4.30	{{{wides}}}	{{{no-balls}}}

Pakistan batting
Player	Status	Runs	Balls	4s	6s	Strike rate
Mudassar Nazar	lbw b Sharma	5	22	1	0	22.73
Mohsin Khan	b Madan Lal	36	53	4	0	67.92
Rameez Raja	b Maninder Singh	10	15	0	0	66.67
Javed Miandad	not out	116	114	3	3	101.75
Saleem Malik	run out	21	37	0	0	56.76
Abdul Qadir	c sub (R Lamba) b Kapil Dev	34	39	1	1	87.18
Imran Khan *	b Madan Lal	7	10	0	0	70.00
Manzoor Elahi	c Shastri b Sharma	4	5	0	0	80.00
Wasim Akram	run out	3	4	0	0	75.00
Zulqarnain†	b Sharma	0	1	0	0	0.00
Tauseef Ahmed	not out	1	1			100.00
Extras	(lb 11)	11				
Total	(9 wickets; 50 overs)	248				

Fall of wickets: 1–9 (Mudassar Nazar), 2–39 (Rameez Raja), 3–61 (Mohsin Khan), 4–110 (Saleem Malik), 5–181 (Abdul Qadir), 6–209 (Imran Khan), 7–215 (Manzoor Elahi), 8–236 (Wasim Akram), 9–241 (Zulqarnain)

India bowling
Bowler	Overs	Maidens	Runs	Wickets	Econ	Wides	NBs
Kapil Dev	10	1	45	1	4.50	{{{wides}}}	{{{no-balls}}}
Chetan Sharma	9	0	51	3	5.67	{{{wides}}}	{{{no-balls}}}
Madan Lal	10	0	53	2	5.30	{{{wides}}}	{{{no-balls}}}
Maninder Singh	10	0	36	1	3.60	{{{wides}}}	{{{no-balls}}}
Ravi Shastri	9	0	38	0	4.22	{{{wides}}}	{{{no-balls}}}
Azharuddin	2	0	14	0	7.00	{{{wides}}}	{{{no-balls}}}
