= List of international cricket five-wicket hauls by Abdul Qadir =

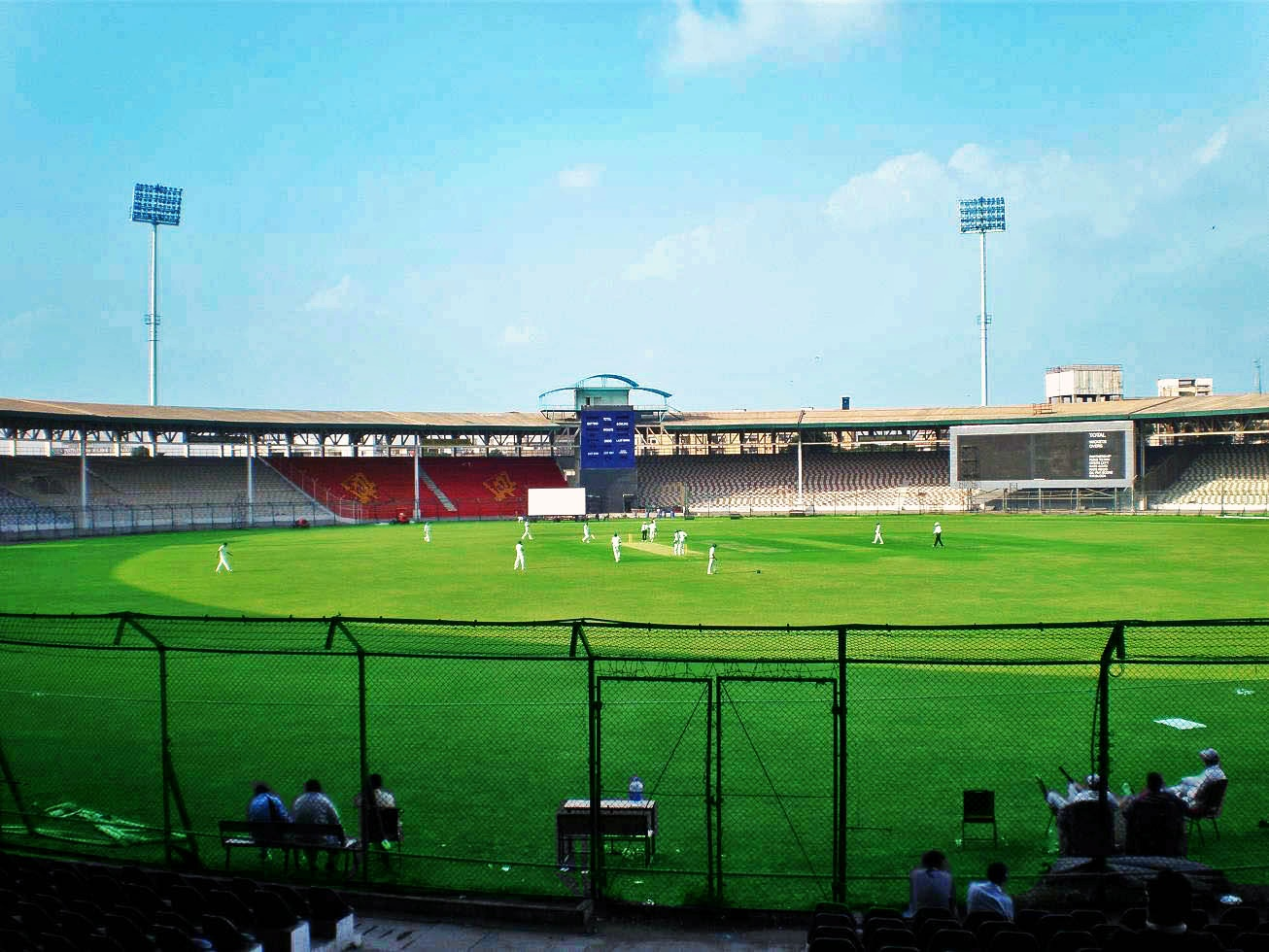
Abdul Qadir took five of his five-wicket hauls at the National Stadium, Karachi.

Abdul Qadir was a Pakistani cricketer who took 17 five-wicket hauls during his career in international cricket. In cricket, a five-wicket haul (also known as a "five–for" or "fifer") refers to a bowler taking five or more wickets in a single innings. This is regarded as a notable achievement, and as of October 2024, only 54 bowlers have taken 15 or more five-wicket hauls at international level in their cricketing careers. A right-arm leg spin bowler who represented his country between 1977 and 1994, Yahoo! Cricket wrote that Abdul Qadir "was a master of the leg-spin" and "mastered the googlies, the flippers, the leg-breaks and the topspins."

Abdul Qadir made his Test debut in 1977 against England at the Gaddafi Stadium, Lahore. His first Test five-wicket haul came the following year against the same team in a match at the Niaz Stadium, Hyderabad. In March 1984 against the English at the Gaddafi Stadium, he took a five-wicket haul in both innings of a Test match for the first time. He repeated this feat only once more in his career, at the National Stadium, Karachi, against the same team, in December 1987. His career-best figures for an innings were 9 wickets for 56 runs against England at the Gaddafi Stadium, in November 1987. In Tests, Qadir was most successful against the English taking eight of his five-wicket hauls against them. He took ten or more wickets in a match on five occasions. Qadir claimed 15 five-wicket hauls in his Test career, and Pakistan never lost any of the games on such instances.

Abdul Qadir made his One Day International (ODI) debut during the 1983 Cricket World Cup against New Zealand at Edgbaston. His first ODI five-wicket haul came in June 1983, against Sri Lanka, a match which Pakistan won at the Headingley Cricket Ground in Leeds. He took 5 wickets for 44 runs in the match, which is his best performance in ODIs. Abdul Qadir took two five-wicket hauls in ODI cricket. As of 2012, he is twenty-sixth overall among all-time combined five-wicket haul takers, a position he shares with Fred Trueman and Derek Underwood. He is fifth in the list of five-wicket haul takers for Pakistan, all formats of the game combined.

== Key ==
| Symbol | Meaning |
|---|---|
| Date | Date the match was held, or starting date of the match for Test matches |
| Inn | The innings of the match in which the five-wicket haul was taken |
| Overs | Number of overs bowled in that innings |
| Runs | Runs conceded |
| Wkts | Number of wickets taken |
| Batsmen | The batsmen whose wickets were taken in the five-wicket haul |
| Econ | Bowling economy rate (average runs per over) |
| Result | The result for the Pakistan team in that match |
| † | Abdul Qadir selected as "Man of the match" |
| ‡ | 10 wickets or more taken in the match |
| * | One of two five-wicket hauls by Abdul Qadir in a match |

== Tests ==
List of Test cricket five-wicket hauls by Abdul Qadir
| No. | Date | Ground | Against | Inn | Overs | Runs | Wkts | Econ | Batsmen | Result |
|---|---|---|---|---|---|---|---|---|---|---|
| 1 | 2 January 1978 | Niaz Stadium, Hyderabad | England | 2 | 24 (Note: Eight-ball overs were bowled in this match.) | 44 | 6 | 1.37 | Brian Rose; Derek Randall; Graham Roope; Bob Taylor; Phil Edmonds; John Lever | Drawn |
| 2 | 22 September 1982† | National Stadium, Karachi | Australia | 3 | 26 | 76 | 5 | 2.92 | Graeme Wood; John Dyson; Allan Border; Kim Hughes; Bruce Yardley | Won |
| 3 | 30 September 1982†‡ | Iqbal Stadium, Faisalabad | Australia | 4 | 50.5 | 142 | 7 | 2.79 | Bruce Laird; John Dyson; Allan Border; Kim Hughes; Peter Sleep; Geoff Lawson; Jeff Thomson | Won |
| 4 | 26 December 1983 | Melbourne Cricket Ground, Melbourne | Australia | 2 | 54.3 | 166 | 5 | 3.04 | Allan Border; Greg Chappell; Rod Marsh; Geoff Lawson; John Maguire | Drawn |
| 5 | 2 March 1984† | National Stadium, Karachi | England | 1 | 31 | 74 | 5 | 2.38 | David Gower; Derek Randall; Ian Botham; Bob Taylor; Nick Cook | Won |
| 6 | 19 March 1984*‡ | Gaddafi Stadium, Lahore | England | 1 | 30 | 84 | 5 | 2.80 | Allan Lamb; Derek Randall; Graeme Fowler; Vic Marks; Neil Foster | Drawn |
| 7 | 19 March 1984*‡ | Gaddafi Stadium, Lahore | England | 3 | 42 | 110 | 5 | 2.61 | Allan Lamb; Derek Randall; Vic Marks; Neil Foster; Norman Cowans | Drawn |
| 8 | 25 November 1984 | Niaz Stadium, Hyderabad | New Zealand | 1 | 40.3 | 108 | 5 | 2.66 | Bruce Edgar; Martin Crowe; Jeremy Coney; John Bracewell; Stephen Boock | Won |
| 9 | 7 November 1985 | National Stadium, Karachi | Sri Lanka | 1 | 20.5 | 44 | 5 | 2.11 | Ravi Ratnayeke; Duleep Mendis; Aravinda de Silva; Ashantha de Mel; Roger Wijesuriya | Won |
| 10 | 24 October 1986 | Iqbal Stadium, Faisalabad | West Indies | 4 | 9.1 | 16 | 6 | 1.68 | Richie Richardson; Larry Gomes; Viv Richards; Roger Harper; Malcolm Marshall; Tony Gray | Won |
| 11 | 6 August 1987‡ | The Oval, London | England | 2 | 44.4 | 96 | 7 | 2.14 | Martyn Moxon; Tim Robinson; Mike Gatting; Ian Botham; John Emburey; Bruce French; Phil Edmonds | Drawn |
| 12 | 25 November 1987†‡ | Gaddafi Stadium, Lahore | England | 1 | 37 | 56 | 9 | 1.51 | Graham Gooch; Chris Broad; Tim Robinson; Mike Gatting; Bill Athey; Phillip DeFreitas; John Emburey; Neil Foster; Nick Cook | Won |
| 13 | 16 December 1987*†‡ | National Stadium, Karachi | England | 1 | 49.4 | 88 | 5 | 1.77 | Bill Athey; Mike Gatting; David Capel; Phillip DeFreitas; Nick Cook | Drawn |
| 14 | 16 December 1987*†‡ | National Stadium, Karachi | England | 3 | 55 | 98 | 5 | 1.78 | Chris Broad; Neil Fairbrother; David Capel; Phillip DeFreitas; Nick Cook | Drawn |
| 15 | 24 February 1989 | Eden Park, Auckland | New Zealand | 2 | 58.1 | 160 | 6 | 2.75 | Robert Vance; Stephen Boock; Mark Greatbatch; Jeff Crowe; John Bracewell; Ewen Chatfield | Drawn |

== One Day Internationals ==
List of ODI five-wicket hauls by Abdul Qadir
| No. | Date | Ground | Against | Inn | Overs | Runs | Wkts | Econ | Batsmen | Result |
|---|---|---|---|---|---|---|---|---|---|---|
| 1 | 16 June 1983† | Headingley, Leeds | Sri Lanka | 2 | 12 | 44 | 5 | 3.66 | Roy Dias; Duleep Mendis; Rumesh Ratnayake; Ranjan Madugalle; Arjuna Ranatunga | Won |
| 2 | 30 January 1984† | Melbourne Cricket Ground, Melbourne | Australia | 1 | 10 | 53 | 5 | 5.30 | Kepler Wessels; David Hookes; Steve Smith; Rod Marsh; Rodney Hogg | Lost |
