= International cricket in 1990 =

International cricket season

The 1990 International cricket season was from May 1990 to September 1990.

== Season overview ==
International tours
Start date	Home team	Away team	Results [Matches]			
Start date	Home team	Away team	Test	ODI	FC	LA
23 May 1990	England	New Zealand	1–0 [3]	1–1 [2]	—	—
18 July 1990	England	India	1–0 [3]	0–2 [2]	—	—
International tournaments
Start date	Tournament				Winners	
25 April 1990	(United Arab Emirates) 1990 Austral-Asia Cup				Pakistan	

== April ==
=== 1990 Austral-Asia Cup ===
Team	P	W	L	T	NR	RR	Points
Australia	2	2	0	0	0	5.260	4
New Zealand	2	1	1	0	0	5.330	2
Bangladesh	2	0	2	0	0	3.110	0

Team	P	W	L	T	NR	RR	Points
Pakistan	2	2	0	0	0	5.460	4
Sri Lanka	2	1	1	0	0	4.661	2
India	2	0	2	0	0	4.500	0

Group stage
No.	Date	Team 1	Captain 1	Team 2	Captain 2	Venue	Result
ODI 623	25 April	India	Mohammad Azharuddin	Sri Lanka	Arjuna Ranatunga	Sharjah Cricket Stadium, Sharjah	Sri Lanka by 3 wickets
ODI 624	26 April	Australia	Allan Border	New Zealand	John Wright	Sharjah Cricket Stadium, Sharjah	Australia by 62 runs
ODI 625	27 April	India	Mohammad Azharuddin	Pakistan	Imran Khan	Sharjah Cricket Stadium, Sharjah	Pakistan by 26 runs
ODI 626	28 April	Bangladesh	Gazi Ashraf	New Zealand	John Wright	Sharjah Cricket Stadium, Sharjah	New Zealand by 161 runs
ODI 627	29 April	Pakistan	Imran Khan	Sri Lanka	Arjuna Ranatunga	Sharjah Cricket Stadium, Sharjah	Pakistan by 90 runs
ODI 628	30 April	Australia	Allan Border	Bangladesh	Gazi Ashraf	Sharjah Cricket Stadium, Sharjah	Australia by 7 wickets
Semi-Finals
No.	Date	Team 1	Captain 1	Team 2	Captain 2	Venue	Result
ODI 629	1 May	New Zealand	John Wright	Pakistan	Imran Khan	Sharjah Cricket Stadium, Sharjah	Pakistan by 8 wickets
ODI 630	2 May	Australia	Allan Border	Sri Lanka	Arjuna Ranatunga	Sharjah Cricket Stadium, Sharjah	Australia by 114 runs
Final
No.	Date	Team 1	Captain 1	Team 2	Captain 2	Venue	Result
ODI 631	4 May	Australia	Allan Border	Pakistan	Imran Khan	Sharjah Cricket Stadium, Sharjah	Pakistan by 36 runs

== May ==
=== New Zealand in England ===
Texaco Trophy - ODI series
No.	Date	Home captain	Away captain	Venue	Result
ODI 632	23 May	Graham Gooch	John Wright	Headingley Cricket Ground, Leeds	New Zealand by 4 wickets
ODI 633	25 May	Graham Gooch	John Wright	Kennington Oval, London	England by 6 wickets
Test series
No.	Date	Home captain	Away captain	Venue	Result
Test 1145	7–12 June	Graham Gooch	John Wright	Trent Bridge, Nottingham	Match drawn
Test 1146	21–26 June	Graham Gooch	John Wright	Lord's, London	Match drawn
Test 1147	5–10 July	Graham Gooch	John Wright	Edgbaston Cricket Ground, Birmingham	England by 114 runs

== July ==
=== India in England ===
Texaco Trophy - ODI series
No.	Date	Home captain	Away captain	Venue	Result
ODI 634	18 July	Graham Gooch	Mohammad Azharuddin	Headingley Cricket Ground, Leeds	India by 6 wickets
ODI 635	20 July	Graham Gooch	Mohammad Azharuddin	Trent Bridge, Nottingham	India by 5 wickets
Test series
No.	Date	Home captain	Away captain	Venue	Result
Test 1148	26–31 July	Graham Gooch	Mohammad Azharuddin	Lord's, London	England by 247 runs
Test 1149	9–14 August	Graham Gooch	Mohammad Azharuddin	Old Trafford Cricket Ground, Manchester	Match drawn
Test 1150	23–28 August	Graham Gooch	Mohammad Azharuddin	Kennington Oval, London	Match drawn
