= Saleem Jaffar =

Pakistani cricketer and coach (born 1962)

Personal information
- Born: 19 November 1962 (age 63); Karachi, Pakistan
- Batting: Right-handed
- Bowling: Left-arm fast-medium

International information
- National side: Pakistan (1986–1992)
- Test debut (cap 106): 20 November 1986 v West Indies
- Last Test: 2 January 1992 v Sri Lanka
- ODI debut (cap 58): 17 October 1986 v West Indies
- Last ODI: 11 November 1990 v West Indies

Career statistics
Competition	Test	ODI
Matches	14	39
Runs scored	42	36
Batting average	5.25	18.00
100s/50s	0/0	0/0
Top score	10*	10*
Balls bowled	2,531	1,900
Wickets	36	40
Bowling average	31.63	34.54
5 wickets in innings	1	0
10 wickets in match	0	0
Best bowling	5/40	3/25
Catches/stumpings	2/–	3/–
- Source: ESPNcricinfo, 4 February 2017

Saleem Jaffar (born 19 November 1962) is a Pakistani cricket coach and former cricketer who played in 14 Test matches and 39 One Day Internationals from 1986 to 1992. Jaffar was born in Karachi, Sindh. He was a right-handed batsman and left-arm fast bowler who played cricket for Pakistan as well as Karachi and United Bank Limited.

== Domestic career ==
Jaffar took 5 for 11 on his first-class debut in 1983–84, and in 1985–86 finished the season with 80 wickets at a bowling average of 19. After retiring from Test cricket, he played in the British Columbia Mainland Cricket League, in Vancouver, BC, Canada.

== International career ==
Jaffar made his Test and ODI debut in Pakistan's home series against West Indies in 1986. His tour of England in 1987 was ended by injury. Against England at Karachi in 1987–88, he took five wickets and was selected for the tour of the Caribbean that followed. His best bowling figures in a Test match, 8 for 134, against New Zealand at Wellington in 1988–89, included his only Test five-for.

== Test cricket ==
Saleem Jaffar was included in the squad for the Test match against West Indies at Faisalabad in 1986. In his first Test, Jaffar scored 9 runs and took 2 wickets for 57 runs. West Indies had earlier scored 240 runs. In the first innings, Jaffar got his first Test wicket by getting Richie Richardson caught by Asif Mujtaba for 43 runs while in the second innings, Jaffar got his second wicket in the match by dismissing Jeff Dujon. Against India in 1987 at Kolkata, he got two wickets for 148 runs, while in the Bangalore Test he could not get a wicket. In the Karachi Test against the England team that visited Pakistan in 1987, his five wickets cost 153 runs. In the Lahore Test against Australia in 1988, Jaffar took 3 wickets for 142 runs. His performance at Wellington against New Zealand in 1989 was remarkable. New Zealand's first innings score of 447 included Martin Crowe's 174 and Andrew Jones's 86. Jaffar got 3 wickets for 94 runs in the first innings and conceded 40 runs for 5 wickets in the second innings. In the second innings, his scalps included Andrew Jones for 39, Martin Crowe for a duck, Dipak Patel for 2, Jeff Crowe 23 and John Bracewell for a duck. He got four wickets in each of the two Tests against New Zealand in Lahore and Faisalabad in 1990. The Faisalabad Test against Sri Lanka in 1992 was his last Test where he got 3 wickets for 55 runs

== 18 runs in the 1987 World Cup ==
The last over of Pakistan's innings that Jaffar bowled in the 1987 World Cup semi-final against Australia cost 18 runs. Pakistan lost the match by the same margin of 18 runs. He played another 10 Tests and 15 ODIs for Pakistan after that, but his performance was not exceptional. The Faisalabad Test against Sri Lanka in 1992 proved to be his last Test. Jaffar's final over was of course not the only reason for Pakistan's defeat in the World Cup semi-final. There were other reasons as well, such as Dickie Bird's wrong dismissal of Imran Khan. Dickie Bird, Imran's favorite umpire, admitted his mistake and apologized to Imran. In this match, wicketkeeper Saleem Yousuf was injured when Abdul Qadir's ball hit him in the face and Miandad had to stand behind the wickets in his place.

== Cricket statistics ==
Jaffar remained unbeaten six times in 14 innings of 14 matches and scored 42 runs at an average of 5.25. 10 unbeaten runs was his highest individual score while he remained unbeaten 11 times in 13 innings of 39 ODIs and scored 36 runs at an average of 18.00. 10 unbeaten runs was his highest individual score in a single innings while he remained unbeaten 29 times in 76 innings of 76 matches in 81 first-class matches and scored 379 runs at an average of 8.06. His 33 not out was the highest score of any one innings. During the course of his Test career, Jaffar took 36 wickets for 1,139 runs at an average of 31.63 apiece. He took 40 wickets in ODIs at an average of 34.55 . His best ODI bowling performance was 3 wickets for 25 runs. In first class matches, he took 263 wickets for 6,697 runs an average of 25.46. Seven wickets for 29 runs was his best bowling performance in any innings.

== After cricket ==
In 2007 he was appointed as a selector for the Pakistan national cricket team.
