= Pakistani cricket team in the West Indies in 1987–88 =

International cricket tour

Pakistani cricket team in the West Indies in 1987/88
	Pakistan	West Indies
- Dates: 2 March 1988 – 27 April 1988
Captains	Imran Khan	Gordon Greenidge (First test); Viv Richards (Second and Third test)

Test series
- Result: 3-match series drawn 1–1
Most runs	Javed Miandad (282)	Viv Richards (280)
Most wickets	Imran Khan (23); Wasim Akram (11)	Malcolm Marshall (15); Winston Benjamin(12)
- Player of the series: Imran Khan (Pak)

One Day International series
- Results: West Indies won the 5-match series 5–0
Most runs	Javed Miandad (247)	Richie Richardson (321)
Most wickets	Imran Khan (8)	Curtly Ambrose (10)

The Pakistan national cricket team toured the West Indies from March to April 1988 and played a three-match Test series and five-match ODI series against the West Indies cricket team which was drawn 1–1.

The tour started with the ODI leg where Pakistan were thrashed by 5/0 despite missing services of Viv Richards due to injury concerns who was arguably the finest batter in world at the time. However, Pakistan staged a brilliant comeback in the test leg of the tour & came closest to end West Indies undefeated record in a test series for 15 years.

In first test at Boruda Stadium in Georgetown in absence of Viv Richards and Malcolm Marshall, Windies were led by the opener Gordon Greenidge suffered their first test defeat at home in ten years after their Packer depleted team lost to Australia at same venue in 1978. Imran Khan coming out of the retirement took an 11 wicket haul in the game along with Miandad's first test century against Windies, Pakistan defeat them by 9 wickets. However, In second test at Trinidad, Viv Richards returned along with Marshall and rescued West Indies batting from 80/4 by scoring his 22nd test ton. Richards also passed 7,000 test runs during the innings and became third fastest to the milestone in 140 innings at the time after Walter Hammond and Garfield Sobers. However, Pakistan secured a draw in the game by a slim margin of 1 wicket through the last stand.

In final game at Barbaods, West Indies won the test by 1 wicket and thus level the series by 1/1 continuing their unbeaten record. The series is widely regarded as among the finest test series of all time.

== Test series summary ==
=== First Test ===
2–6 April 1988
(5-day match)
Scorecard

West Indies	v	Pakistan
292 (80.4 overs); AL Logie 80 (96); Imran Khan 7/80 (22.4 overs)		435 (122 overs); Javed Miandad 114 (235); CA Walsh 3/80 (27 overs)
172 (62.4 overs); CG Greenidge 43 (91); Imran Khan 4/41 (14.4 overs)		32/1 (3.3 overs); Rameez Raja 18* (11); BP Patterson 1/19 (2 overs)

Pakistan won by 9 wickets
Bourda, Georgetown
Umpires: DM Archer and LH Barker
Player of the match: Imran Khan (PAK)

- West Indies won the toss and elected to bat.
- The match was scheduled for five days but completed in four.
- 5 April was taken as a rest day.
- CEL Ambrose (WIN) made his Test debut.

=== Second Test ===
14–19 April 1988
(5-day match)
Scorecard

West Indies	v	Pakistan
174 (53.3 overs); Viv Richards 49 (45); Imran Khan 4/38 (16.3 overs)		194 (59.1 overs); Saleem Malik 66 (99); MD Marshall 4/55 (20 overs)
391 (124.4 overs); Viv Richards 123 (169); Imran Khan 5/115 (45 overs)		341/9 (129 overs); Javed Miandad 102 (265); WKM Benjamin 3/73 (32 overs)

Match drawn
Queen's Park Oval, Port of Spain
Umpires: LH Barker and CE Cumberbatch
Player of the match: Viv Richards (WIN)

- Pakistan won the toss and elected to field.
- 18 April was taken as a rest day.
- Viv Richards passed 7,000 test runs

=== Third Test ===
22–27 April 1988
(5-day match)
Scorecard

Pakistan	v	West Indies
309 (74.4 overs); Rameez Raja 54 (76); Shoaib Mohammad 54 (107); MD Marshall 4/79 (18.4 overs)		306 (84 overs); Viv Richards 67 (80); Wasim Akram 3/88 (27 overs)
262 (93.5 overs); Shoaib Mohammad 64 (141); MD Marshall 5/65 (23 overs)		268/8 (77 overs); RB Richardson 64 (72); Wasim Akram 4/73 (31 overs)

West Indies won by 2 wickets
Kensington Oval, Bridgetown
Umpires: DM Archer and LH Barker
Player of the match: MD Marshall (WIN)

- West Indies won the toss and elected to field.
- 25 April was taken as a rest day.

== One Day Internationals (ODIs) ==
West Indies won the series 5–0.

=== 1st ODI ===
12 March 1988
Scorecard

West Indies; 241/4 (46 overs)	v	Pakistan; 194/7 (46 overs)
AL Logie 109* (119); Imran Khan 3/36 (8 overs)		Javed Miandad 47 (83); CEL Ambrose 4/39 (10 overs)

West Indies won by 47 runs
Sabina Park, Kingston, Jamaica
Umpires: JR Gayle and D Sang Hue
Player of the match: AL Logie (WIN)

- Pakistan won the toss and elected to field.
- The match was reduced to 46 overs per side.
- CEL Ambrose (WIN) made his ODI debut.

=== 2nd ODI ===
15 March 1988
Scorecard

Pakistan; 166/9 (46 overs)	v	West Indies; 167/5 (37.1 overs)
Imran Khan 53 (82); CEL Ambrose 4/35 (10 overs)		PV Simmons 54 (60); Mudassar Nazar 2/30 (7 overs)

West Indies won by 5 wickets
Antigua Recreation Ground, St. John's, Antigua and Barbuda
Umpires: LH Barker and PC Whyte
Player of the match: WKM Benjamin (WIN)

- West Indies won the toss and elected to field.
- The match was reduced to 46 overs per side.
- Haafiz Shahid (PAK) made his ODI debut.

=== 3rd ODI ===
18 March 1988
Scorecard

West Indies; 315/4 (47 overs)	v	Pakistan; 265 (43.3 overs)
DL Haynes 142* (132); Saleem Malik 1/41 (7 overs)		Saleem Malik 85 (55); BP Patterson 3/78 (10 overs)

West Indies won by 50 runs
Queen's Park Oval, Port of Spain, Trinidad
Umpires: CE Cumberbatch and M Hosein
Player of the match: DL Haynes (WIN)

- Pakistan won the toss and elected to field.
- The match was reduced to 47 overs per side.
- Aamer Malik (PAK) made his ODI debut.

=== 4th ODI ===
20 March 1988
Scorecard

Pakistan; 271/6 (43 overs)	v	West Indies; 272/3 (40.1 overs)
Rameez Raja 71 (72); BP Patterson 3/77 (9 overs)		RB Richardson 79* (87); Haafiz Shahid 2/56 (9.1 overs)

West Indies won by 7 wickets
Queen's Park Oval, Port of Spain, Trinidad
Umpires: GT Browne and CE Cumberbatch
Player of the match: CG Greenidge (WIN)

- Pakistan won the toss and elected to bat.
- The match was reduced to 43 overs per side.
- Moin-ul-Atiq (PAK) made his ODI debut.

=== 5th ODI ===
30 March 1988
Scorecard

Pakistan; 221/7 (43 overs)	v	West Indies; 225/3 (37 overs)
Javed Miandad 100* (99); AH Gray 3/44 (10 overs)		PV Simmons 79 (73); Imran Khan 2/59 (8 overs)

West Indies won by 7 wickets
Bourda, Georgetown, Guyana
Umpires: DM Archer and CR Duncan
Player of the match: Javed Miandad (PAK)

- West Indies won the toss and elected to field.
- The match was reduced to 43 overs per side.
