= Millmow =

Millmow is a surname. Notable people with the surname include:

- Alex Millmow, Australian economic historian
- Jonathan Millmow (born 1967), New Zealand cricketer
