= Sulaman Qadir =

Pakistani cricketer (born 1984)

Personal information
- Born: 28 December 1984 (age 41); Lahore, Punjab, Pakistan
- Relatives: Abdul Qadir (father); Usman Qadir (brother); Umar Akmal (brother-in-law)
- Source: Cricinfo, 27 March 2021

Sulaman Qadir (born 28 December 1984) is a Pakistani cricketer. He played in 26 first-class and 40 List A matches between 2000 and 2013. He made his Twenty20 debut on 25 April 2005, for Lahore Lions in the 2004–05 National Twenty20 Cup.

He runs his father's cricket academy in Lahore and is credited for launching the career of fast bowler Naseem Shah.

== See also ==
- Cricket in Pakistan
