= Pakistani cricket team in England in 1987 =

International cricket tour

The Pakistan cricket team toured England in the 1987 season to play a five-match Test series against England. Pakistan won the series 1-0 with 4 matches drawn. This was the first Test series that Pakistan won against England in England.

== One Day Internationals (ODIs) ==
England won the Texaco Trophy 2-1.

=== 1st ODI ===
21 May 1987
Scorecard

Pakistan; 232/6 (55 overs)	v	England; 233/3 (53.1 overs)
Javed Miandad 113 (145); NA Foster 2/36 (11 overs)		BC Broad 99 (168); Mudassar Nazar 1/41 (11 overs)

England won by 7 wickets
The Oval, London
Umpires: DR Shepherd and AGT Whitehead
Player of the match: BC Broad (ENG)

- England won the toss and elected to field.

=== 2nd ODI ===
23 May 1987
Scorecard

England; 157 (51.1 overs)	v	Pakistan; 158/4 (52 overs)
BC Broad 52 (84); Wasim Akram 2/18 (9.1 overs)		Javed Miandad 71* (129); NA Foster 2/25 (11 overs)

Pakistan won by 6 wickets
Trent Bridge, Nottingham
Umpires: DJ Constant and BJ Meyer
Player of the match: Javed Miandad (PAK)

- Pakistan won the toss and elected to field.

=== 3rd ODI ===
25 May 1987
Scorecard

Pakistan; 213/9 (55 overs)	v	England; 217/9 (54.3 overs)
Javed Miandad 68 (128); NA Foster 3/29 (11 overs)		MW Gatting 41 (56); Mudassar Nazar 2/17 (11 overs)

England won by 1 wicket
Edgbaston, Birmingham
Umpires: HD Bird and KE Palmer
Player of the match: PAJ DeFreitas (ENG)

- England won the toss and elected to field.

== Test series summary ==
=== First Test ===
4–9 June 1987
Scorecard

England	v	Pakistan
447 (143.4 overs); RT Robinson 166 (365); Wasim Akram 4/111 (46 overs)		140/5 (64 overs); Mansoor Akhtar 75 (182); PH Edmonds 1/2 (7 overs)

Match drawn
Old Trafford, Manchester
Umpires: HD Bird and BJ Meyer
Player of the match: RT Robinson (ENG)

- Pakistan won the toss and elected to field.
- 7 June was taken as a rest day.
- There was no play on the final day.
- NH Fairbrother (ENG) made his Test debut.

=== Second Test ===
18–23 June 1987
Scorecard

England	v	Pakistan
368 (112.5 overs); CWJ Athey 123 (202); Mudassar Nazar 2/26 (16 overs)

Match drawn
Lord's, London
Umpires: DJ Constant and AGT Whitehead
Player of the match: CWJ Athey (ENG)

- England won the toss and elected to bat.
- 21 June was taken as a rest day.
- There was no play on the second, fourth and fifth days.

=== Third Test ===
2–6 July 1987
Scorecard

England	v	Pakistan
136 (60.4 overs); DJ Capel 53 (161); Mohsin Kamal 3/22 (8.4 overs)		353 (131.2 overs); Saleem Malik 99 (238); NA Foster 8/107 (46.2 overs)
199 (78.1 overs); DI Gower 55 (136); Imran Khan 7/40 (19.1 overs)

Pakistan won by an innings and 18 runs
Headingley, Leeds
Umpires: KE Palmer and DR Shepherd
Player of the match: Imran Khan (PAK)

- England won the toss and elected to bat.
- 5 July was taken as a rest day.
- The match was scheduled for five days but completed in four.
- DJ Capel (ENG) made his Test debut.

=== Fourth Test ===
23–28 July 1987
Scorecard

Pakistan	v	England
439 (173.3 overs); Mudassar Nazar 124 (416); GR Dilley 5/92 (35 overs)		521 (169.5 overs); MW Gatting 124 (399); Imran Khan 6/129 (41.5 overs)
205 (73.3 overs); Shoaib Mohammad 50 (152); NA Foster 4/59 (27 overs)		109/7 (17.4 overs); BC Broad 30 (23); Wasim Akram 2/41 (8.4 overs)

Match drawn
Edgbaston, Birmingham
Umpires: BJ Meyer and AGT Whitehead
Player of the match: MW Gatting (ENG)

- England won the toss and elected to field.
- 26 July was taken as a rest day.

=== Fifth Test ===
6–11 August 1987
Scorecard

Pakistan	v	England
708 (220.3 overs); Javed Miandad 260 (617); GR Dilley 6/154 (47.3 overs)		232 (99.4 overs); MW Gatting 61 (164); Abdul Qadir 7/96 (44.4 overs)
		315/4 (f/o) (142 overs); MW Gatting 150* (346); Abdul Qadir 3/115 (53 overs)

Match drawn
The Oval, London
Umpires: DJ Constant and KE Palmer
Player of the match: Javed Miandad (PAK)

- Pakistan won the toss and elected to bat.
- 9 August was taken as a rest day.

The Pakistan innings of 708 is the highest in Test match history not to feature a wide.

== Annual reviews ==
- Playfair Cricket Annual 1988
- Wisden Cricketers' Almanack 1988

== External sources ==
- Pakistan tour of England 1987 at ESPN Cricinfo
- CricketArchive – tour itineraries
