= Chetan Sharma =

Indian cricket player and politician

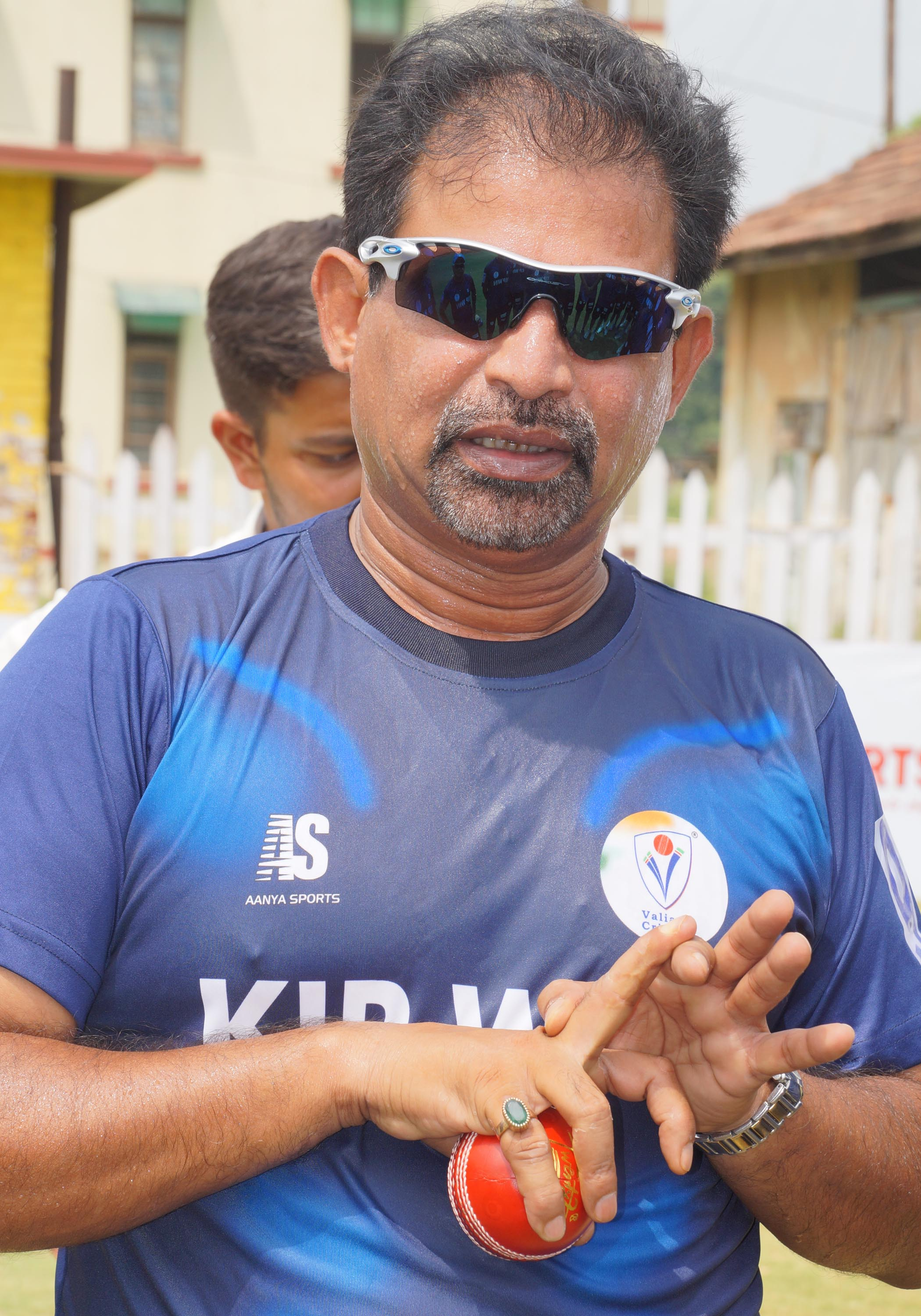
- Sharma in 2015

Personal information
- Born: 3 January 1966 (age 60); Ludhiana, Punjab, India
- Height: 160 cm (5 ft 3 in)
- Batting: Right-handed
- Bowling: Right-arm fast-medium
- Role: All rounder

International information
- National side: India
- Test debut (cap 167): 17 October 1984 v Pakistan
- Last Test: 3 May 1989 v West Indies
- ODI debut (cap 45): 7 December 1983 v West Indies
- Last ODI: 11 November 1994 v West Indies

Domestic team information
- Years: Team
- 1982/83–1992/93: Punjab
- 1993/94–1996/97: Mumbai

Career statistics
Competition	Test	ODI	FC	LA
Matches	23	65	121	107
Runs scored	396	456	3,714	852
Batting average	22.00	24.00	35.03	23.66
100s/50s	0/1	1/0	3/21	1/2
Top score	54	101*	114*	101*
Balls bowled	3470	2,835	19,934	4,504
Wickets	61	67	433	115
Bowling average	35.45	34.86	26.05	31.42
5 wickets in innings	4	0	24	1
10 wickets in match	1	0	1	0
Best bowling	6/58	3/22	7/72	5/16
Catches/stumpings	7/–	7/–	71/–	20/–
Medal record
Men's Cricket
Representing India
ACC Asia Cup
Winner	1984 United Arab Emirates
- Source: ESPNcricinfo, 24 December 2020

Chetan Sharma (born 3 January 1966) is an Indian former cricket player who played Tests and ODIs as a fast bowler for Indian cricket team. Sharma was the first man to take a hat-trick in a Cricket World Cup, achieving this feat in the 1987 Cricket World Cup against New Zealand. His hat-trick was also the first time an Indian bowler took one in the ODI format. He was also a part of the Indian squad which won the 1985 World Championship of Cricket.

After retirement Sharma appeared as a cricket pundit at multiple Indian TV news networks. On 24 December 2020, he was selected as chairman of the selection committee of Indian cricket team.

In November 2022, he was sacked from the position of BCCI national chief selector after team India's exit from the 2022 T20 World Cup. Later BCCI re-appointed him.

== Domestic career ==
He made his first class debut for Punjab at the age of 17 and appeared in One Day Internationals a year later.

== International career ==
Making his first appearance in Tests against Pakistan at Lahore in 1984, he bowled Mohsin Khan with his fifth ball – becoming the third Indian to take a wicket in his first over in Test cricket. He took fourteen wickets in the three Tests in Sri Lanka in 1985.

Sharma was an important member of the Indian team that defeated England 2–0 in 1986. He took sixteen wickets in the two Tests that he played. He took 10 wickets at Birmingham, including a career best 6 for 58 in the second innings. It remains the only 10 wicket haul by an Indian in England. He also is one of the few Indian pacers, like his mentor Kapil Dev, to take a 5 wicket haul in his 32-over spell to end with 5-64 and also have his name permanently etched in the Hall of Fame board at Lord's Cricket Ground. Though only twenty at the time, he picked up frequent injuries which restricted his career. When available, he was the first choice as the opening bowler with Kapil Dev for the next three years.

For his ability to get useful runs down the order that too at quick rate, Sharma was seen as a natural successor to Kapil Dev in the all-rounder category. By the early nineties, his bowling had dropped in pace and sharpness and his strike rate dropped considerably.

=== 1986 Austral-Asia Cup final ===
Sharma bowled the last ball to Pakistan's Javed Miandad in the final of the Austral-Asia cup in Sharjah in 1986. With Pakistan needing four runs to win off the final ball, Sharma bowled a low full toss outside the leg stump, which Miandad hit for six. This was the first time an international game had ended in that manner. That defeat started a chain of defeats for Indian cricket team in Sharjah.

=== 1987 World Cup ===
In the Reliance World Cup in 1987, Sharma took the first hat-trick in the history of tournament when he clean bowled Ken Rutherford, Ian Smith and Ewen Chatfield of New Zealand off consecutive balls.

=== Post World Cup ===
He played the most noted innings of his career against England in the Nehru Cup in 1989. Sent in at No.3 with India facing a target of 256, he scored 101* in 96 balls, completing his hundred with the match-winning run. He made another important contribution in India's win against Australia in the next match, sharing an unfinished partnership of 40 runs with Manoj Prabhakar and ending the match with a six. But his bowling had waned considerably and he was excluded from the tour of Pakistan a few weeks later.

=== Late career ===
Sharma received few opportunities thereafter. In one of his last international appearances, against New Zealand in a three nations tournament in 1994 he ended up with figures of 1–0–23–0 after being hit for five fours off consecutive balls by Stephen Fleming. He moved from Haryana to Bengal in 1993 and stayed there till the end of his career in 1996.

== After cricket ==
After his retirement, Chetan became a cricket commentator. He opened a Fast bowling cricket academy in Panchkula in Haryana in 2004 which closed down in 2009. Chetan is the nephew of the former Indian cricketer Yashpal Sharma.

=== Political career ===
Chetan contested the Lok Sabha (2009) polls from Faridabad on a Bahujan Samaj Party (BSP) ticket. He came 3rd polling 18.2 percent votes. He subsequently joined the Bharatiya Janta Party (BJP), and was appointed party's sports cell convener.

=== As Chief selector ===
In December 2020, he was elected as chairman of the selection committee of Indian cricket team. Later in November 2022, he was sacked from the position after team India's exit from the T20 Cricket World Cup. However, he was re-appointed on the same post upon applying for it.

==== Controversy and resignation ====
In February 2023, he courted controversy when he got filmed in a sting operation which alleged that Indian cricketers take injections to expedite their return to the national team, despite being only 80 to 85% fit; he also revealed that Virat Kohli lied to media in 2021 that BCCI removed him from ODI captaincy without discussing to defame then BCCI president Sourav Ganguly. He resigned from the post of chief selector a few days after the release of sting operation.
