= 1986 Austral-Asia Cup =

International cricket tournament

- Cricket format: One Day International
- Tournament format: Knock-out
- Host: United Arab Emirates
- Champions: Pakistan (1st title)
- Runners-up: India
- Participants: 5
- Matches: 5
- Player of the series: (India) SM Gavaskar
- Most runs: (India) SM Gavaskar (163)
- Most wickets: (Pakistan) Wasim Akram (7)

The 1986 Austral-Asia Cup was held in Sharjah, UAE, between April 10–18, 1986. Five national teams took part: Australia, India, New Zealand, Pakistan and Sri Lanka.

The 1986 Austral-Asia Cup was a knock-out tournament. Sri Lanka qualified automatically for the semi-finals by virtue of winning the 1986 Asia Cup. Despite losing their first-round match, New Zealand qualified for the semi-finals as the first-round loser with the lesser margin of defeat.

Pakistan won the tournament, defeating India in the final, courtesy of a famous last-ball six by Javed Miandad and won US$40,000.

The tournament was played for the joint benefit of Javed Miandad, Wazir Mohammad, Vijay Hazare and Dilip Vengsarkar.

== Matches ==
First round		Semi-Finals		Final
		Sri Lanka	205/9
New Zealand	132/8	India	206/7
India	134/7			India	245/7
Australia	202/7			Pakistan	248/9
Pakistan	206/2	New Zealand	64 all out
		Pakistan	66/0

=== First round ===
10 April 1986
Scorecard

New Zealand; 132/8 (44 overs)	v	India; 134/7 (41.4 overs)
JJ Crowe 36* (56); Maninder Singh 3/23 (9 overs)		CS Pandit 33* (34); EJ Chatfield 3/14 (9 overs)

India won by 3 wickets
Sharjah Cricket Stadium, Sharjah, UAE
Umpires: DM Archer (WIN) and AJ Gaynor (WIN)
Player of the match: EJ Chatfield (NZ)

- India won the toss and elected to field.
- The match was reduced to 44 overs per side.
- CS Pandit (IND) made his ODI debut.

11 April 1986
Scorecard

Australia; 202/7 (50 overs)	v	Pakistan; 206/2 (49.1 overs)
GM Ritchie 60* (72); Tauseef Ahmed 2/19 (10 overs)		Mudassar Nazar 95 (140); RJ Bright 1/28 (10 overs)

Pakistan won by 8 wickets
Sharjah Cricket Stadium, Sharjah, UAE
Umpires: DM Archer (WIN) and AJ Gaynor (WIN)
Player of the match: Mudassar Nazar (PAK)

- Australia won the toss and elected to bat.

=== Semi-finals ===
13 April 1986
Scorecard

Sri Lanka; 205/9 (50 overs)	v	India; 206/7 (49.1 overs)
AP Gurusinha 68 (113); C Sharma 3/35 (9 overs)		SM Gavaskar 71 (109); ALF de Mel 3/40 (10 overs); SD Anurasiri 3/40 (10 overs)

India won by 3 wickets
Sharjah Cricket Stadium, Sharjah, UAE
Umpires: DM Archer (WIN) and AJ Gaynor (WIN)
Player of the match: SM Gavaskar (IND)

- India won the toss and elected to field.

15 April 1986
Scorecard

New Zealand; 64 (35.5 overs)	v	Pakistan; 66/0 (22.4 overs)
EJ Gray 17 (75); Abdul Qadir 4/9 (10 overs)		Mohsin Khan 34* (69)

Pakistan won by 10 wickets
Sharjah Cricket Stadium, Sharjah, UAE
Umpires: DM Archer (WIN) and AJ Gaynor (WIN)
Player of the match: Abdul Qadir (PAK)

- Pakistan won the toss and elected to field.
- New Zealand qualified for the semi-final by losing their first-round match by a lesser margin than Australia.

=== Final ===
18 April 1986
Scorecard

India; 245/7 (50 overs)	v	Pakistan; 248/9 (50 overs)
SM Gavaskar 92 (134); Wasim Akram 3/42 (10 overs)		Javed Miandad 116* (114); C Sharma 3/51 (9 overs)

Pakistan won by 1 wicket
Sharjah Cricket Stadium, Sharjah, UAE
Umpires: DM Archer (WIN) and AJ Gaynor (WIN)
Player of the match: Javed Miandad (PAK)

- Pakistan won the toss and elected to field.
- Attendance: 20,000.

== See also ==
- Austral-Asia Cup
