= Tariq Ata =

Pakistani cricket umpire (1943–1989)

Personal information
- Born: 1943
- Died: 24 July 1989 (aged 45–46)

Umpiring information
- Tests umpired: 1 (1988)
- ODIs umpired: 6 (1982–1988)
- Source: Cricinfo, 16 July 2013

Tariq Ata (1943 – 24 July 1989) was an international cricket umpire from Pakistan. Besides umpiring in domestic matches, he officiated in one Test match, Pakistan vs. Australia, in 1988, and six ODI games from 1982 to 1988.

== See also ==
- List of Test cricket umpires
- List of One Day International cricket umpires
