= English cricket team in Pakistan in 1987–88 =

International cricket tour

The England national cricket team toured Pakistan in November to December 1987 and played a three-match Test series against the Pakistan national cricket team. Pakistan won the Test series 1–0. England were captained by Mike Gatting and Pakistan by Javed Miandad. In addition, the teams played a three-match Limited Overs International (LOI) series which England won 3–0.

== One Day Internationals (ODIs) ==
England won the series 3-0.

=== 1st ODI ===
18 November 1987
Scorecard

Pakistan; 166 (41.3 overs)	v	England; 167/8 (44.3 overs)
Rameez Raja 38 (54); JE Emburey 3/17 (8.3 overs)		GA Gooch 43 (59); Wasim Akram 3/25 (9 overs)

England won by 2 wickets
Gaddafi Stadium, Lahore
Umpires: Shakeel Khan and Shakoor Rana
Player of the match: JE Emburey (ENG)

- Pakistan won the toss and elected to bat.
- Within ten days of losing the World Cup Final, England played an ODI.
- Zahid Ahmed (PAK) made his ODI debut.

=== 2nd ODI ===
20 November 1987
Scorecard

England; 263/6 (44 overs)	v	Pakistan; 240/8 (44 overs)
GA Gooch 142 (134); Abdul Qadir 3/30 (8 overs)		Rameez Raja 99 (122); NA Foster 2/47 (9 overs)

England won by 23 runs
National Stadium, Karachi
Umpires: Khizer Hayat and Mahboob Shah
Player of the match: GA Gooch (ENG)

- England won the toss and elected to bat.
- The match was reduced to 44 overs per side.
- Rameez Raja, off the last ball of the match, became the first batsman to be dismissed obstructing the field in one-day internationals.

=== 3rd ODI ===
22 November 1987
Scorecard

England; 236/8 (45 overs)	v	Pakistan; 138 (31.5 overs)
BC Broad 66 (110); Abdul Qadir 3/49 (9 overs)		Saleem Malik 52 (78); NA Foster 3/20 (6.5 overs)

England won by 98 runs
Shahi Bagh Stadium, Peshawar
Umpires: Amanullah Khan and Javed Akhtar
Player of the match: NA Foster (ENG)

- England won the toss and elected to bat.
- RC Russell (ENG) and Shakeel Khan (PAK) made their ODI debuts.

== Test series summary ==
=== First Test ===
25–28 November 1987
(5-day match)
Scorecard

England	v	Pakistan
175 (83 overs); BC Broad 41 (165); Abdul Qadir 9/56 (37 overs)		392 (134 overs); Mudassar Nazar 120 (257); NGB Cook 3/87 (31 overs)
130 (79.2 overs); JE Emburey 38* (90); Abdul Qadir 4/45 (36 overs)

Pakistan won by an innings and 87 runs
Gaddafi Stadium, Lahore
Umpires: Amanullah Khan and Shakeel Khan
Player of the match: Abdul Qadir (PAK)

- England won the toss and elected to bat.
- The match was scheduled for five days but completed in four.

=== Second Test ===
7–12 December 1987
(5-day match)
Scorecard

England	v	Pakistan
292 (114.2 overs); BC Broad 116 (339); Iqbal Qasim 5/83 (35.2 overs)		191 (84.3 overs); Saleem Malik 60 (169); NA Foster 4/42 (18 overs)
137/6d (40 overs); GA Gooch 65 (74); Abdul Qadir 3/45 (15 overs)		51/1 (24 overs); Saleem Malik 28* (46); NGB Cook 1/15 (9 overs)

Match drawn
Iqbal Stadium, Faisalabad
Umpires: Khizer Hayat and Shakoor Rana
Player of the match: BC Broad (ENG)

- England won the toss and elected to bat.
- 10 December was taken as a rest day.
- There was no play on the third day.
- Aamer Malik (PAK) made his Test debut.

=== Third Test ===
16–21 December 1987
(5-day match)
Scorecard

England	v	Pakistan
294 (121.4 overs); DJ Capel 98 (264); Abdul Qadir 5/88 (49.4 overs)		353 (133.5 overs); Aamer Malik 98 (329); PAJ DeFreitas 5/86 (23.5 overs)
258/9 (137 overs); GA Gooch 93 (279); Abdul Qadir 5/98 (55 overs)

Match drawn
National Stadium, Karachi
Umpires: Khizer Hayat and Mahboob Shah
Player of the match: Abdul Qadir (PAK)

- England won the toss and elected to bat.
- 19 December was taken as a rest day.
