= Tauseef Ahmed =

Pakistani cricketer

Personal information
- Born: 10 May 1958 (age 68); Karachi, Sindh, Pakistan
- Batting: Right-handed
- Bowling: Right-arm off-break
- Role: Bowler
- Relatives: Waleed Ahmed (son)

International information
- National side: Pakistan
- Test debut: 27 February 1980 v Australia
- Last Test: 1 December 1993 v Zimbabwe
- ODI debut (cap 41): 31 March 1982 v Sri Lanka
- Last ODI: 23 February 1990 v Australia

Career statistics
Competition	Test	ODI
Matches	34	70
Runs scored	318	116
Batting average	17.66	10.54
100s/50s	0/0	0/0
Top score	35*	27*
Balls bowled	7,778	3,250
Wickets	93	55
Bowling average	31.72	40.85
5 wickets in innings	3	0
10 wickets in match	0	0
Best bowling	6/45	4/38
Catches/stumpings	9/–	10/–
- Source: ESPNcricinfo, 4 February 2006

Tauseef Ahmed (born 10 May 1958) is a Pakistani former cricketer who played in 34 Test matches and 70 One Day Internationals between 1980 and 1993.

== Career ==
Tauseef Ahmed made his first-class debut in early 1979 for Public Works Department against Pakistan International Airlines that was to remain his only first-class game for just over a year until his neighbor, Javed Sadiq, managed to get him a chance to bowl at the Pakistani tail-enders before the 1980 Karachi Test against Australia. Tauseef was impressive enough to prompt the newly appointed Pakistani captain Javed Miandad himself and even the manager Mushtaq Mohammad to pad up and check him out. Elsewhere, during the same net session, both Imran Khan and Sarfraz Nawaz too were extremely impressed and those few hours earned Tauseef his first Test cap. The hard-working Ilyas Khan, whom he replaced, would never play for Pakistan again.

In a startling debut, Tauseef took 7 for 126, dismissing Kim Hughes twice and Greg Chappell once, sharing 18 wickets with Iqbal Qasim (the other two falling to Imran Khan). He did not even know the names of the opposing Australian players when he made his debut.

After 12 wickets at 29 in his first series, he had to wait for two more years and played for a depleted Pakistani side against the visiting Sri Lankans, again performing admirably. During these rubbers, he formed an effective partnership with Iqbal Qasim.

Imran Khan's appointment as captain in 1982 meant tougher times for Tauseef . A firm believer in wrist-spinners, Imran revived the career of Abdul Qadir and used him as Pakistan's prime spinner. Tauseef though finally cemented his place with a series of telling performances against Sri Lanka, first at home in 1985 when he took 5 for 54 at Karachi to set up a win on a turning track and later, his career-best match award-winning return in Sri Lanka at Kandy in 1986 (9 for 77 including 6 for 45 in the second innings) where he sparked an innings win despite a Pakistani score of 230 (Sri Lankans were bowled out for 101 and 109). Weeks later, he produced some exceptional one-day returns in Sharjah, including a critical single that enabled Javed Miandad to hit his fabled last-ball six to beat India in the final of the 1986 Austral-Asia Cup.

As a crickter, Tauseef soon understood his role . He was to offer control when playing with Abdul Qadir or Iqbal Qasim. West Indians, in 1986, found him impossible to score off and he showed his courage under fire in a series-saving eighth wicket partnership with Imran in fading light on a Karachi wicket with a wickedly uneven bounce against Malcolm Marshall and company.

When Abdul Qadir was unsuccessful against India in 1987 and Iqbal Qasim rejoined the team, Tauseef ended up joining the latter at Bangalore. India's defensive approach was based on playing the waiting game on slow turners, expecting the inexperienced Pakistani batting line-up (with just Imran and Miandad having played more than 30 tests) to crumble at some point . For four tests, they waited until at Bangalore, Kapil Dev, having led India to two 2–0 wins (against England (away) and against Sri Lanka (at home), came under immense pressure to get a result. Both captains misread the wicket: Pakistan played the left-arm fast-bowler Saleem Jaffer who would not bowl a ball in the match. Imran won the toss and batted and Tauseef's glorious run began; he scored a crucial unbeaten 15 in the first innings enabling Pakistan to cross 100 and then sparked the fightback by bowling Krish Srikkanth and Sunil Gavaskar through the gate that very day. Pakistan, after getting bowled out for just 116, spun India out for just 145 with both Tauseef and Iqbal Qasim getting five wickets each. In the second innings, Tauseef's all-round skills reached a peak when he was part of the only 50-run partnership of the match, his own share being just 10, as the Pakistanis set India a target of 221 to win. That day would end with Tauseef firing out Dilip Vengsarkar and Kiran More. The next day, Pakistan, hunting for the remaining six wickets, got four through Iqbal Qasim, including that of the threatening Sunil Gavaskar, before Tauseef's sharp-spinning off break went through Shivlal Yadav's defences. Roger Binny hit back with a massive six of Tauseef who was surprised when Imran handed the ball to him to have another go. He did and so did Binny and could only manage an inside edge to Saleem Yousuf who gobbled it up to give Pakistan their first-ever test series win in India. As in the first test, Tauseef had shared 18 wickets with Iqbal Qasim except that this time round, both had nine each with crucial runs to boot.

He would remain a vital cog in Pakistani teams until the emergence of Waqar Younis and Mushtaq Ahmed in 1989 which enabled the aging Imran Khan to surrender the new ball and groom Mushtaq as the future spinner for Pakistan. Nevertheless, Tauseef kept making occasional returns, putting up admirable shows in Australia in 1990. He disappeared from the international scene as Pakistan increasingly went for a three pacemen-one spinner combo and Mushtaq Ahmed developed rapidly. A surprise late wicketless recall in 1993 meant little for him even though he remained a giant in Pakistan's domestic cricket.

Tauseef generally bowled a relatively flat and brisk line rather than relying heavily on flight. He was thrifty as his economy rate of under 2.3 in Test Matches and 4.15 in One Day Internationals would testify and valued his wicket dearly and was a brilliant fielder.
