= Sanjeev Sharma =

Indian cricketer (born 1965)

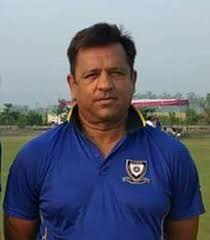

Personal information
- Full name: Sanjeev Sharma
- Born: 25 August 1965 (age 61); Delhi
- Batting: Right-handed
- Bowling: Right-arm medium

International information
- National side: India (1988–1997)
- Test debut (cap 184): 02 December 1988 v New Zealand
- Last Test: 26 July 1990 v England
- ODI debut (cap 65): 2 January 1988 v West Indies
- Last ODI: 20 July 1990 v England

Career statistics
Competition	Test	ODI	FC	LA
Matches	2	23	89	61
Runs scored	56	80	2,785	573
Batting average	28.00	10.00	36.16	26.04
100s/50s	0/0	0/0	3/16	0/2
Top score	38	28	117	58
Balls bowled	4,140	2,979	14,982	2,602
Wickets	6	22	41	47
Bowling average	41.16	36.95	43.80	43.80
5 wickets in innings	0	3	8	0
10 wickets in match	0	0	0	0
Best bowling	2/37	5/26	8/76	5/26
Catches/stumpings	11/0	27/0	39/0	16/0
Medal record
Men's Cricket
Representing India
ACC Asia Cup
Winner	1988 Bangladesh
- Source: ESPNcricinfo, 9 March 2019

Sanjeev Sharma (born 25 August 1965) is a former Indian cricketer, entrepreneur and cricket coach who played in two Test matches and 23 One Day Internationals from 1988 to 1997. As right arm medium pace bowler, he was one of several bowlers tried out as Kapil Dev's opening partners in the 80's. He made an impressive start by polishing off the tail on his Test debut against New Zealand in 1988–89 to finish with three for 37. He toured West Indies in 1989. After a career that spanned nearly 20 years, he announced his retirement from competitive cricket in November 2004. He was a part of the Indian squad which won the 1988 Asia Cup.

His best batting figure against Uttar Pradesh is 117 not-out in the first innings and 55 not-out in the second innings at Karnail Singh Stadium, Delhi during Ranji Trophy in 1991. He was awarded the man of the match for this batting performance.

In August 2019, he was appointed the coach of Senior Arunachal Pradesh Cricket Team.

These days, he spends his time running a franchise of UClean in Delhi. UClean is India's largest laundry and dry-cleaning chain which works on the franchise model.
