= David Capel =

English cricketer (1963–2020)

Personal information
- Full name: David John Capel
- Born: 6 February 1963; Northampton, England
- Died: 2 September 2020 (aged 57); Northampton, England
- Batting: Right-handed
- Bowling: Right-arm medium-fast

Career statistics
Competition	Test	ODI	FC	LA
Matches	15	23	313	345
Runs scored	374	327	12,202	7,011
Batting average	15.58	19.23	29.68	27.38
100s/50s	0/2	0/1	16/72	4/28
Top score	98	50*	175	121
Balls bowled	2,000	1,038	33,070	12,315
Wickets	21	17	546	237
Bowling average	50.66	47.35	32.18	32.52
5 wickets in innings	0	0	14	1
10 wickets in match	0	0	0	0
Best bowling	3/88	3/38	7/44	5/51
Catches/stumpings	6/–	6/–	156/–	84/–
- Source: ESPNcricinfo, 2 September 2020

David John Capel (6 February 1963 – 2 September 2020) was an English cricketer who played for Northamptonshire County Cricket Club and the English cricket team. Cricket writer Colin Bateman noted that "Capel was one of those unfortunate cricketers who became tagged as being the next all-rounder to fill Ian Botham's boots". He was well known for his long stint with Northamptonshire as a player as well as coach for nearly 32 years. He died on 2 September 2020, at the age of 57, after being diagnosed with a brain tumour in 2018.

== Playing career ==
An irrepressible enthusiast, Capel was a batsman who bowled but, because of his dual role, found himself pushed down the order. He joined Northamptonshire in 1980 as an "apprentice cricketer" without much experience and made his first-class debut in 1981 against the visiting Sri Lankans. He played in 313 first-class matches, scoring 12,202 runs and taking 546 wickets. Capel also featured in 345 List A matches scoring 7,011 runs and taking 237 wickets. He spent most of his playing career with Northamptonshire, representing the club in 270 first-class matches and 300 List A matches, and helping them to win the NatWest Trophy in 1992. He retired from first-class cricket in 1998.

He made his international Test match debut against Pakistan in 1987 at Headingley, becoming the first Northamptonshire-born cricketer in 77 years to represent England in test cricket after George Thompson. He walked to the crease when England were at 31 for 5 and scored a fifty against Imran Khan and Wasim Akram. He eventually top scored in England's first innings total of 136 with 53 off 161 balls. He registered his career best of 98 in punishing conditions in Karachi against Pakistan in 1987–88, in his fourth Test match in his career. However, he followed it up with a string of poor scores and was discarded with a batting average below 20 and a bowling average close to 50 in both forms of the international game. He dismissed Viv Richards three times in his career, as well as forming part of the pace quartet which won in Jamaica in 1989–90. This was England's first Test victory over the West Indies for sixteen years, although it would be the only time in his Test career when he finished on the winning side. He ended up playing fifteen Tests and twenty-three One Day Internationals (ODIs) for England. He was part of the 1992-3 England "A" tour to Australia.

== Later career ==
After retiring from playing competitive cricket in 1998, Capel became the director of excellence of the Northamptonshire County Cricket Club in 1999. Capel also eventually took over the academy at Northamptonshire. He became the head coach of the Northamptonshire County Cricket Club in 2006, replacing Kepler Wessels. He served as the head coach of the county until 2012. On 2 July 2012, Northants Cricket sacked him from the position of head coach of the club following the conclusion of the 2012 Twenty20 Cup. It ended his 32-year-long association with the club.

After eight years as the head coach of Northamptonshire, Capel became the assistant coach of the England women's cricket team in 2013, staying in the role until 2015. In October 2016, he was appointed by the Bangladesh Cricket Board (BCB) as the head coach of the Bangladesh women's cricket team, initially for an agreed period of four months. However, his contract was extended by the BCB, and he served as Bangladesh women's team head coach until 2018. In May 2020, he was inducted into the Northamptonshire CCC Hall of Fame.

Capel underwent surgery in 2018 after being diagnosed with a brain tumour. Having battled the condition for two years, he died from complications on 2 September 2020.
