= Antonio Gaynor =

West Indian cricket umpire (born 1946)

Personal information
- Born: 6 March 1946 (age 80); Jamaica

Umpiring information
- ODIs umpired: 6 (1986)
- Source: Cricinfo, 18 May 2014

Antonio Joseph Gaynor (born 6 March 1946) is a former West Indian cricket umpire. His international umpiring career began and ended in 1986 when he officiated in six ODI games.

== See also ==
- List of One Day International cricket umpires
