= Jonathan Millmow =

New Zealand cricketer (born 1967)

Personal information
- Full name: Jonathan Paul Millmow
- Born: 22 September 1967 (age 59); Wellington, New Zealand
- Batting: Right-handed
- Bowling: Right-arm fast-medium

International information
- National side: New Zealand
- ODI debut (cap 67): 26 April 1990 v Australia
- Last ODI: 25 May 1990 v England

Career statistics
Competition	ODI	FC	LA
Matches	5	37	34
Runs scored	0	129	57
Batting average	–	8.06	9.50
100s/50s	0/0	0/0	0/0
Top score	0*	16*	20
Balls bowled	270	5,709	1,566
Wickets	4	99	35
Bowling average	58.00	28.17	28.40
5 wickets in innings	0	4	0
10 wickets in match	0	1	0
Best bowling	2/22	6/13	4/33
Catches/stumpings	1/–	10/–	8/–
- Source: Cricinfo, 20 April 2017

Jonathan Paul Millmow (born 22 September 1967) is a former New Zealand cricketer who played five One Day Internationals.
