= Yahoo Cricket =

Cricket-related website hosted and administered by Yahoo! India

Yahoo! Cricket was a cricket website based in India. While in name part of the US-based Yahoo!'s Yahoo! Sports, it was hosted and administered by Yahoo! India.

In February 2009, Yahoo! India signed a three-year partnership with the International Cricket Council (ICC), to become the exclusive online partner for all ICC events. This included the ICC World Twenty20, ICC Champions Trophy and ICC Cricket World Cup. According to comScore, April 2009 data, Yahoo! Cricket was attracting 2.43 million unique users per month, which ranked it as the top cricket site in India.

In August 2021, Yahoo! India shut down the website because of new foreign direct investment regulations of India.
