= Austral-Asia Cup =

- Administrator: Sharjah Cricket Association
- Format: One Day International
- First edition: 1986
- Latest edition: 1994
- Tournament format: Round-robin and knock out
- Number of teams: 6 per tournament
- Current champion: Pakistan (3rd title)
- Most successful: Pakistan (3 titles)
- Most runs: (India) Mohammad Azharuddin (371)
- Most wickets: (Pakistan) Wasim Akram (18)

The Austral-Asia Cup was a One Day International cricket tournament held at Sharjah, United Arab Emirates. The Arab millionaire Abdur Rahman Bukhathir brought cricket initially to Sharjah in the mid-1980s and organized a multi-nation one-day tournament involving several cricketing nations such as Australia, India, New Zealand, Pakistan and Sri Lanka. The tournament was discontinued after 1994 Austral-Asia Cup primarily due to an increasingly congested international cricket calendar and conflicting scheduling between member boards. The launch of the ICC KnockOut Trophy in 1998 was a major, definitive factor in keeping the Austral-Asia Cup permanently defunct.

== First edition 1986 ==
Won by Pakistan

The first tournament was held at Sharjah in April 1986. India beat New Zealand and Pakistan beat Australia in the first round. Sri Lanka as Asia Cup winners got a bye to the semi-final, where they lost to India. New Zealand fielding a weakened team were bowled all out for 64 in the other semi. Abdul Qadir took 4–9 in 10 overs.

Pakistan and India met in the final in front of a capacity crowd of 20,000. India scored 245–7 with Sunil Gavaskar top-scoring with 92. Pakistan needed 90 to win of the last ten overs. Javed Miandad held the innings together. In a tense finale, the last over bowled by Chetan Sharma began with 11 runs required and two wickets fell in that over. Pakistan was nine wickets down and needed four runs with Javed Miandad facing the final ball. Chetan Sharma's intended yorker became a full toss which was dispatched into the crowds by Javed for a six. Pakistan finished on 248–9 with Javed finishing on 116 not out. It is still considered one of the most historic moments in one-day cricket history and Javed became a Pakistani national hero.

== Second edition 1990 ==
Won by Pakistan

The second tournament took place in April 1990 at Sharjah with Bangladesh joining in. The six teams were split into 2 groups:

Group A: Australia, New Zealand and Bangladesh

Group B: India, Pakistan and Sri Lanka.

With Bangladesh and India falling by the wayside, Australia beat Sri Lanka in the first semi-final with Simon O'Donnell hitting a then world record 50 in 18 balls. Pakistan again bowled New Zealand out for less than 100 to go through to the final. During the tournament Waqar Younis took 4 wickets in an innings three successive times: 4–42, 6–26 and 5–20.

Pakistan scored 266–7 in the final and Australia's 10 match winning streak was brought to an end by Wasim Akram. He ended their innings with a hat-trick, clean-bowling Merv Hughes, Carl Rackemann and Terry Alderman. Australia making 230-all out.

== Third edition 1994 ==
Won by Pakistan

The United Arab Emirates (UAE) replaced Bangladesh as the sixth team in the tournament, with the UAE playing their first ever One Day International match. Again there were two groups of three teams.

Group A: India, Pakistan, United Arab Emirates

Group B: Australia, New Zealand and Sri Lanka.

The UAE and Sri Lanka did not make the semis. India defeated Australia in the first semi-final and this time Pakistan scored 328–2 with a then world record stand for the 2nd wicket between Aamer Sohail (134) and Inzamam-ul-Haq (137 not out) of 263 against New Zealand and won by 62 runs.

This set up the final most people wanted: India v Pakistan. Pakistan made 250 for 6, with Aamer Sohail top scoring with 69. India were bowled all out for 211. Pakistan had a hat-trick of Austral-Asia Cup triumphs.

== See also ==
- Asia Cup
- Champions Trophy
