= Azhar Hossain =

Bangladeshi cricketer (born 1964)

Personal information
- Born: 15 March 1964 (age 62); Dacca, East Pakistan (present-day Dhaka, Bangladesh)
- Batting: Right-handed
- Bowling: Right-arm offbreak

International information
- National side: Bangladesh
- ODI debut (cap 14): 27 October 1988 v India
- Last ODI: 31 December 1990 v Sri Lanka
- Source: CricInfo, 13 February 2006

Azhar Hossain (born 15 March 1964) is a former Bangladeshi cricketer who played in seven One Day Internationals from 1988 to 1990. Though, in and out of the national squad, Azhar was still a very dominant figure in domestic cricket arena throughout the 80's. The highlight of his international career was his 54 against NZ at Sharjah in 1990. That is the first 50 scored by a Bangladeshi in ODI. Later on, in 1999, his nephew Mehrab Hossain became the first Bangladeshi to score a century in ODI (at Dhaka against Zimbabwe). An opening batsman, He also picked up 4 wickets in ODIs bowling gentle off-breaks.

== In ICC trophy ==
Azhar represented Bangladesh in the 1990 ICC Trophy in Netherlands. He scored 83 runs with the bat in 7 innings, with a highest of 28 against the Netherlands. With the ball, he took 7 wickets for 285 runs, with his best figures,2/24 against Bermuda.
