= Haafiz Shahid =

Pakistani cricketer (born 1963)

Personal information
- Born: 10 May 1963; Lahore, Pakistan
- Batting: Right-handed
- Bowling: Right-arm fast-medium
- Role: Bowler

International information
- National side: Pakistan
- ODI debut (cap 64): 15 March 1988 v West Indies
- Last ODI: 31 October 1988 v India

Domestic team information
- Years: Team
- 1984–1987: WAPDA
- 1985: Lahore City Blues
- 1986–1989: Lahore City

Career statistics
Competition	ODI	FC	LA
Matches	3	24	14
Runs scored	11	752	102
Batting average	11.00	25.06	10.20
100s/50s	0/0	0/4	0/0
Top score	7*	67	33
Balls bowled	127	2,636	602
Wickets	3	56	20
Bowling average	37.33	28.51	23.80
5 wickets in innings	0	3	0
10 wickets in match	0	1	0
Best bowling	2/56	7/59	3/14
Catches/stumpings	0/–	3/–	1/–
- Source: CricketArchive, 26 June 2013

Haafiz Shahid Yaqoob (Urdu: حافظ شاہد یعقوب) (born 10 May 1963) is a former Pakistani cricketer who played three One Day Internationals in 1988. He plays domestic tournament by WAPDA. He was right arm fast medium bowler. He makes his international debut in 1988.
