= Moin-ul-Atiq =

Pakistani cricketer (born 1964)

Cricket information
- Batting: Right-handed
- Bowling: Legbreak

International information
- National side: Pakistan

Career statistics
Competition	ODI
Matches	5
Runs scored	199
Batting average	39.80
100s/50s	1/0
Top score	105
Catches/stumpings	0/–
- Source: CricInfo, 3 May 2006

Moin-ul-Atiq (born 5 August 1964) is a Pakistani former cricketer who played five One Day Internationals between 1988 and 1989. He worked as the sports psychologist of Pakistan national cricket team in 2012.

== Early life and education ==
Moin-ul-Atiq was born in 1964 at Karachi. He studied at Hamdard University, where he completed his MBA in marketing in 2003. Later, he earned a master's degree in sports management from University of Central Lanchashire in 2005.
