= Abdul Qadir (cricketer) =

Pakistani cricketer (1955–2019)

Abdul Qadir SI
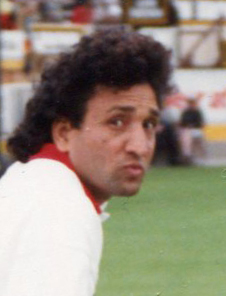
- Qadir in 1990

Personal information
- Full name: Abdul Qadir Khan
- Born: 15 September 1955; Lahore, Punjab, Pakistan
- Died: 6 September 2019 (aged 63); Lahore, Punjab, Pakistan
- Batting: Right-handed
- Bowling: Right-arm leg break
- Role: Bowler
- Relatives: Sulaman Qadir (son); Imran Qadir (son); Usman Qadir (son); Umar Akmal (son-in-law)

International information
- National side: Pakistan (1977–1993)
- Test debut (cap 78): 14 December 1977 v England
- Last Test: 6 December 1990 v West Indies
- ODI debut (cap 43): 11 June 1983 v West Indies
- Last ODI: 2 November 1993 v Sri Lanka

Career statistics
Competition	Test	ODI	FC	LA
Matches	67	104	209	147
Runs scored	1,029	641	3,740	869
Batting average	15.36	15.26	18.33	14.01
100s/50s	0/3	0/0	2/8	0/0
Top score	61	41*	112	41*
Balls bowled	16,864	5,100	49,036	7,014
Wickets	236	132	960	202
Bowling average	32.81	26.16	23.24	23.09
5 wickets in innings	15	2	75	3
10 wickets in match	5	0	21	0
Best bowling	9/56	5/44	9/49	5/31
Catches/stumpings	15/–	21/–	83/–	92/–
- Source: ESPNcricinfo, 9 January 2019

Abdul Qadir Khan SI (Urdu: عبد القادر خان, 15 September 1955 – 6 September 2019) was an international cricketer who bowled leg spin for Pakistan in the late 1970s and 1980s. Qadir's style of bowling consisted of a rhythmic cantering walk before an aggressive ball toss. He was the leading leg-break bowler of his generation and the one younger players like Shane Warne looked up to. Later Qadir was a commentator and chief selector of the Pakistan Cricket Board, from which he resigned in 2009.

He appeared in 67 Tests and 104 One Day International (ODI) matches between 1977 and 1993, and captained the Pakistan cricket team in five ODIs. In Test cricket, his best performance for a series was 30 wickets for 437 runs, in three Test matches at home against England in 1987. He achieved Pakistan's best bowling figures in a Test innings, which was 9/56 in that series. In November 2022, Qadir was inducted into the ICC Hall of Fame.

In ODIs, his best bowling figures were five wickets for 44 runs against Sri Lanka during the 1983 Cricket World Cup. He was a member of the Pakistani team in the 1983 and 1987 Cricket World Cups. Yahoo! Cricket described Qadir as "a master of the leg-spin" who "mastered the googlies, the flippers, the leg-breaks and the topspins." He is widely regarded as among the best spin bowlers of his generation and was included in Richie Benaud's Greatest XI shortlist of an imaginary cricket team from the best players available from all countries and eras. Former English captain Graham Gooch said that Qadir "was even finer than Shane Warne".

He was educated at the Government College University, Lahore.

== Early life and education ==
Abdul Qadir was born on 15 September 1955 to a poor family in the Dharampura neighbourhood of Lahore, Pakistan. He was the second of four children. He was raised in an orthodox Muslim family, as his father worked as an imam. He began his cricket career as a batsman for Arif High School in Lahore before joining his local Dharampura Gymkhana cricket team. He attended the Government College University in Lahore before making his first-class cricket debut in 1975.

== First-class career ==
Qadir played first-class cricket for Lahore, Punjab and Habib Bank Limited cricket teams from 1975 to 1995. During his first-class career, he achieved five or more wickets in an innings on seventy-five occasions, and ten or more wickets in a match twenty-one times. He also scored two centuries and eight half centuries in first-class cricket.

He made his debut for Habib Bank against United Bank Limited at the National Stadium during the 1975–76 season. He took seven wickets in the match conceding 93 runs, including six wickets for 67 runs in the first innings. Qadir played for Lahore C and took six wickets for 17 runs against Bahawalpur, his best bowling figures of the season.

Qadir played 209 first-class matches and took 960 wickets with an average of 23.24. His best bowling figures for an innings were nine wickets for 56 runs, whereas his best performance for a match was 13 wickets for 101 runs. He was a useful lower-order batsman who scored two first-class centuries and eight fifties, his highest innings being 112. He scored 3,740 runs, averaging 18.33 from 247 innings. He also scored two centuries and eight fifties. Qadir played his last first-class match in 1994.

== International career ==
=== Test career ===
Natural talent combined with aggression and passion made Qadir one of the most successful spinners of his era. He had a distinct run-up, bounding in to the crease, and a great variety of deliveries: there was the orthodox leg-break, the topspinner, two googlies and the flipper. He was unique for bowling leg spin at a time when it was not only rare but considered obsolete, and he kept the torch alight for a generation of leg spinners. His fervent appeals made him a great favourite with the spectators but sometimes got him into trouble with umpires. Qadir played 67 Test matches during 1977–90 and took 236 wickets, with an average of 32.80, including 15 five-wicket hauls. His best bowling performance was against England at the Gaddafi Stadium, Lahore in 1987. He also scored 1,029 runs including three fifties.

Qadir showed promise from his very first Test series, bowling along with left-arm spinner Iqbal Qasim, with Wisden Almanack describing him as "the most notable discovery of his type for some time." He made his Test debut against England at his home ground, Gaddafi Stadium, on 14 December 1977. His leg-breaks and googlies both caused problems for the English batsmen, but he was only able to take one wicket and his length began to falter late in the innings, forcing Pakistan to take the new ball and bowl their fast bowlers instead. He was far more successful in the second Test match. He took 6 wickets for 44 runs in 24 overs, bowling around the wicket into the footmarks of English fast bowler Bob Willis, giving him the best bowling figures for a Pakistan bowler against England. After taking five wickets in the third and final Test match, he finished as the leading wicket-taker for the series with 12 wickets at an average of 25.41.

His second Test series, in England in 1978, was an injury-plagued let-down, but he was a strong and established force by his return in 1982, when his six wickets in the Lord's Test played a major role in a historic Pakistani victory. He took ten wickets in the series with an average of 40.60.

Qadir's first significant performance came in the 1982–83 series against Australia, taking seven wickets for 156 runs and 11 wickets for 218 runs in the first two Test matches—man of the match in both the matches. He accumulated 22 wickets—Pakistani record against Australia—conceding 562 runs and with the average of 25.54 in the three-Test series. Due to his performance with the ball, he won the man of the series award for first time in his Test career. Pakistan clean-swept the series, winning the first and the third Test by nine wickets each, and the second Test by an innings and three runs. Qadir took 19 wickets for 451 runs with the help of three five-wicket hauls in following home series against England. Pakistan recorded their first series win against England. In the 1985–86 home series against Sri Lanka, he took six wickets in the third match at Karachi.

At the Kennington Oval in 1987, Qadir's ten-wicket haul ensured another series win, this time in England. Three months later, in the next home series against the same team, Qadir took 30 wickets for 437 runs in three Tests, including the best bowling figures in an innings by a Pakistani– 9/56 at the Gaddafi Stadium. This is also the seventh best performance for an innings in Test cricket, and the best by any bowler against England. He achieved his career best performance in an innings, 61 runs, at the National Stadium, Karachi. Pakistan won another series against England and this performance earned Qadir another man of the series award. During this crusade, he moved past the 200-wicket mark, becoming the first man from his country ever to do so. He was ineffective against India in the 1989–90 home series, taking only six wickets from four Tests with an average above 57. He played his last Test against the West Indies in December 1990 at the Gaddafi Stadium.

=== One Day International career ===
Qadir made his ODI debut against New Zealand at Edgbaston during 1983 Cricket World Cup; He took four wickets for 21 runs in 12 overs, earning him the man of the match award. He took 12 wickets for 264 runs in the tournament with an average of 22.00, including a five-wicket haul against Sri Lanka at Headingley, Leeds. In the 1983–84 World Series Cup, Qadir played eight matches and took 15 wickets at the average of 18.13, including five wickets for 53 against Australia at the Melbourne Cricket Ground, a match Pakistan lost by 43 runs. In the 1985–86 home season, he took six wickets against Sri Lanka, and five wickets against the West Indies including four wickets for 17 runs at the Gaddafi Stadium. His eight wickets in six matches were the second highest figures against India in 1986–87. Sachin Tendulkar played him smoothly in his first Test series for India.

Qadir captained the Pakistan cricket team during England's tour to Pakistan, losing all the three matches; he topped the list of highest wicket takers during the 1987–88 series between the teams, with eight wickets at the average of 13.17. He took six wickets during the 1988–89 Wills Asia Cup at the average of 17.00, including three wickets for 27 runs, against India in the fifth match at the Bangabandhu National Stadium, Dhaka. During the Nehru Cup in 1989–90, he was second in the list of leading wicket takers, with 12 wicket from seven matches at the average of 21.75. His best figure in a match during the tournament were three wickets for 27 runs, against Australia at the Brabourne Stadium, Bombay. Qadir played his last ODI against Sri Lanka at the Sharjah Cricket Association Stadium in 1993. In total, Qadir played 104 ODIs during 1977–93, taking 132 wickets and averaged 26.16. He also took two five-wicket hauls, including his best ODI performance of five wickets for 44 runs against Sri Lanka during the 1983 World Cup. He scored 641 runs in ODIs, and his highest score in this format of the game was 41 not out. He donated a car, won as best Group B player during 1987 Cricket World Cup, to Imran Khan for his Shaukat Khanum Memorial Cancer Hospital and Research Centre project.

== Captaincy ==
Qadir was not successful as a captain. He captained the Pakistan cricket team in five Test matches during 1987–88 and 1988–89, losing four of them. He captained Pakistan for the first time against England, in the absence of regular captain, Javed Miandad. The three matches he captained in, against the same team, were lost by Pakistan. In ODI matches, he captained Pakistan against Bangladesh and India in the fourth and fifth match of the 1988 Asia Cup respectively; Pakistan defeated Bangladesh by 173 runs, and lost to India by four wickets.

== Chief selector ==
Qadir replaced Saleem Jaffar, former Pakistan fast bowler, as chief selector in November 2008 for the series against India. A series of three Tests, five ODIs and three T20Is was scheduled to be hosted by Pakistan; the series could not take place due to the deterioration of both countries' diplomatic relationship after the 2008 Mumbai attacks. His next assignment was team selection for the home series against Sri Lanka; the tour was arranged as a replacement for the scheduled tour of India which was cancelled by BCCI. The series was abandoned following an attack on the Sri Lankan team in Lahore during the second Test between the teams. Qadir resigned from the post in June 2009 without explaining any concern.

== Controversy ==
Talking with Hasan Jalil at Pakistan Television (PTV) show in 2004, Qadir said: "We all know the ball has always been made up [tampered with] by Pakistani fast bowlers, but with so much scrutiny on this series, this has not been possible." PTV cancelled his contract stating that "We are a national network and we have certain codes of conduct on what can and cannot be said on air. By talking about ball-tampering and claiming that every successful Pakistani bowler had 'made' the ball, he was damaging national pride, and that is against our policy. So we dropped him."

== Personal life ==
Qadir was born on 15 September 1955 in Lahore, Punjab, Pakistan. His brother, Ali Bahadur, was also a leg-spinner who appeared in 10 first-class matches during 1986–87. His three sons, Rehman Qadir, Imran Qadir and Sulaman Qadir, also represented different Pakistani teams in the first-class competition, while his younger son, Usman Qadir, has played in 12 List A matches. His daughter, Noor Aamina, married Umar Akmal.

== Death and legacy ==
On 7 September 2019, Qadir died of cardiac arrest in Lahore. Qadir died nine days before his 64th birthday. The Pakistan Cricket Board (PCB) paid tributes to Qadir with their chairman, Ehsan Mani, calling him a "maestro with the ball". Wasim Khan, the PCB's Chief Executive added: "Abdul Qadir was one of the all-time greatest. His friendly and warm presence will forever be missed".

Shane Warne said: "It's very sad news, so condolences to Abdul Qadir's family. I had the opportunity to meet him in 1994 on my first tour to Pakistan. I think a lot of people who bowled leg-spin, like I did, he was the guy who we looked up to in the eighties. He was the main leg-spinner in that era. He was a terrific bowler who bamboozled a lot of batsmen. His record is a terrific one."

Prime Minister Imran Khan called him "a genius, one of the greatest leg spinners of all time", adding that "Qadir's bowling statistics do not do justice to his genius".

He was posthumously awarded Sitara-i-Imtiaz the third highest civilian award of Pakistan by the Government of Pakistan in 2021.

== See also ==
- List of international cricket five-wicket hauls by Abdul Qadir
- Benaud–Qadir Trophy
