= Sharjah Cricket Stadium =

Test cricket stadium in the United Arab Emirates

- SCS
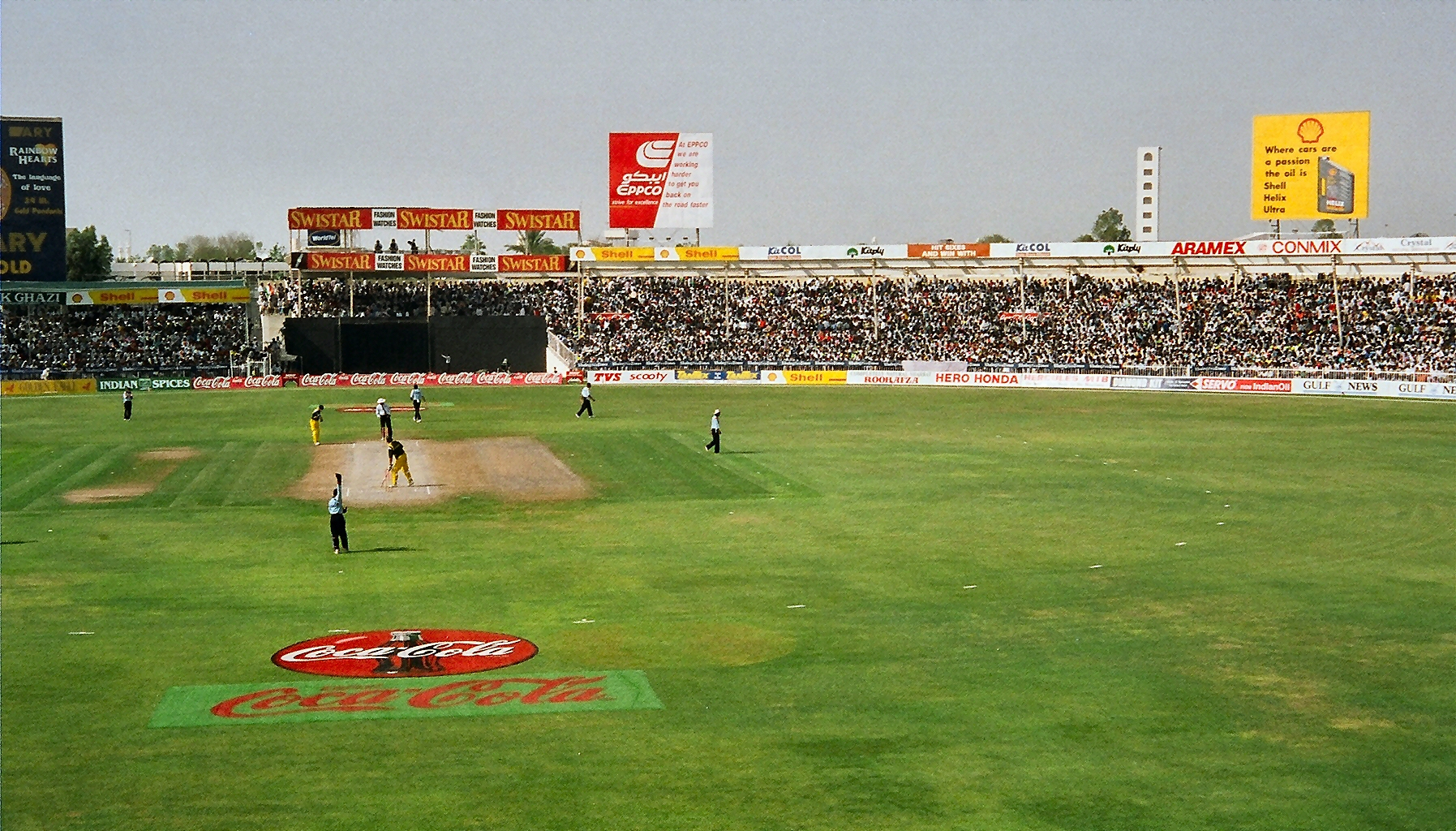
- Sharjah Cricket Ground in 1998

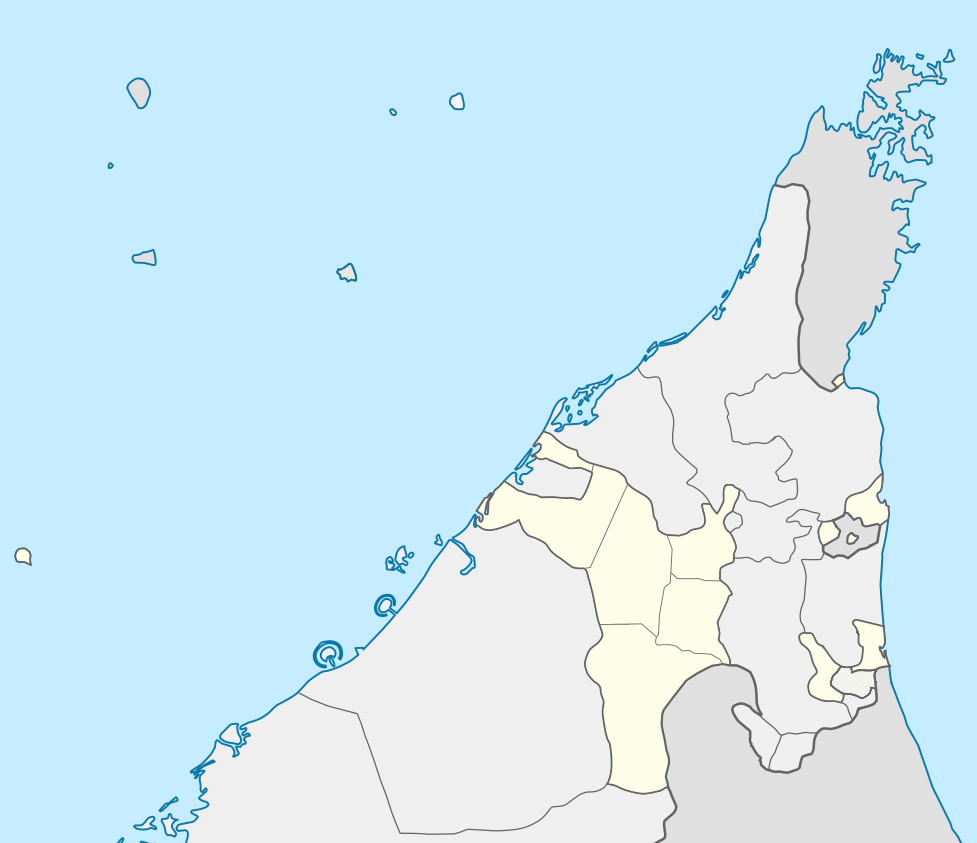
- Location of Sharjah Cricket Stadium in Emirate of Sharjah map
- Interactive map of Sharjah Cricket Stadium

Ground information
- Location: Sharjah, United Arab Emirates
- Country: United Arab Emirates
- Coordinates: 25°19′51″N 55°25′15″E
- Establishment: 1982; 44 years ago
- Capacity: 16,000
- Owner: Emirates Cricket Board
- Tenants: United Arab Emirates; Desert Vipers; Sharjah Warriors

International information
- First men's Test: 31 January – 4 February 2002: Pakistan v West Indies
- Last men's Test: 13–17 November 2026: Afghanistan v Zimbabwe
- First men's ODI: 6 April 1984: Pakistan v Sri Lanka
- Last men's ODI: 22 September 2024: Afghanistan v South Africa
- First men's T20I: 3 March 2013: Afghanistan v Scotland
- Last men's T20I: 1 November 2026: Afghanistan v Zimbabwe
- First women's ODI: 9 January 2015: Pakistan v Sri Lanka
- Last women's ODI: 5 November 2017: Pakistan v New Zealand
- First women's T20I: 15 January 2015: Pakistan v Sri Lanka
- Last women's T20I: 18 October 2024: New Zealand v West Indies

Team information
Afghanistan national cricket team	(2013–present)
United Arab Emirates	(2009–present)
Desert Vipers	(2023–present)
Sharjah Warriors	(2023–present)
- As of 18 October 2024; Source: ESPNcricinfo

The Sharjah Cricket Stadium (Arabic: ملعب الشارقة للكريكيت) is located in Sharjah in the United Arab Emirates. It holds the record for being the venue that hosted the highest number of international matches, 318 matches, up to October 5, 2025. Highest numbers of ODI Matches played in a venue is another record kept by this venue.

It was originally constructed in the early 1980s and has been much improved over the years. The stadium hosted its first international matches in April 1984, in the Asia Cup.

It was at this stadium, on 18 April 1986, that Pakistan batter Javed Miandad (116*) hit a last-ball six to beat India in the 1986 Austral-Asia Cup final.

It was also here, in 1998, that Sachin Tendulkar scored 143 runs to help win a match against Australia during the 1997–98 Coca-Cola Cup tournament. He also scored 134 runs against the same team in the final match of that tournament.

== Usage and Developments of Sharjah Cricket Stadium ==
In 2010, at the behest of local cricketing patron Abdul Rahman Bukhatir, the Sharjah Cricket Stadium became the home ground for the Afghanistan cricket team for One Day International and first-class matches. In 2016, Afghanistan changed their home ground to Greater Noida Sports Complex Ground in Noida, India. The Multan Sultans and the Quetta Gladiators used the Sharjah Cricket Stadium for most of their home games in the most recent PSL season.This is the first GCC LED lit cricket stadium that uses innovative and advanced control systems and DMX Technology .

The new pitch lighting Signify system replaces 392 conventional metal Halide floodlights with 176 LED floodlights, allowing for energy conservation.

The cricket stadium also hosted the inaugural edition of the T10 cricket league, which is a 90-minute cricket league from 14 to 17 December 2017 featuring several international cricket players.

The stadium also hosted the final of the 2018 Blind Cricket World Cup.

The Sharjah stadium was one of the dedicated venues for the 2021 ICC Men's T20 World Cup.

It has 62 metre boundaries in long on and 58 metre in straight. It has 65 metre boundary in mid wicket.

== Test matches ==
Sharjah cricket stadium is one of the few Test Cricket Grounds at which a Test match has been played not involving a home country participant (and the only one in a non-Test playing country) Sharjah was the venue for four Test matches in 2002. Because of security and safety concerns in Pakistan and its aftermath) the ground was chosen as a neutral venue to host two Test matches between Pakistan and the West Indies in February and two Test matches between Pakistan and Australia in October.

The fifth Test match held at the ground took place in November 2011, as the third Test between Sri Lanka and Pakistan. The other games in the series were played at the Sheikh Zayed Stadium, Abu Dhabi and Dubai International Cricket Stadium.

As of 9 November 2026 ten Test matches have been played at Sharjah, of which four in 2002 and five played between 2011 and 2016 all involved Pakistan; the tenth, in 2026, was between Afghanistan and Zimbabwe.

== One Day Internationals ==
Between 1984 and 2003, the Sharjah ground was the venue for 206 One Day Internationals held as part of commercially sponsored one day tournaments involving three or four international teams. Sharjah was a popular venue attracting good crowds mostly from the South Asian population of the United Arab Emirates. The tournaments were organised by "The Cricketers Benefit Fund Series (CBFS)" which had been established in 1981 by Abdul Rahman Bukhatir, and whose main aim was to honour cricketers of the past and present generations from India and Pakistan, with benefit purses in recognition of their services to the game of cricket. The stadium initially started with a few limited seats and very modest facilities but by 2002 had a 17,000 capacity and floodlights.

Since 2003 the increasingly crowded cricket calendar has precluded the holding of any major international matches at Sharjah although the stadium has been the venue for certain other matches, for example in the 2004 ICC Intercontinental Cup. It has also been used by the Afghanistan national team since 2010. In 2011, the Guinness Book of Records recorded the Sharjah stadium as hosting the greatest number of one-day matches. As of December 2019, 240 ODIs had been played at the ground.

== ICC Men's T20 World Cup ==
The venue hosted 11 group-stage matches during 2021 ICC Men's T20 World Cup.

== Indian Premier League ==
The UAE has hosted matches in the Indian Premier League, with matches being played on the ground on each occasion. The 2014 season was played in the UAE due to the 2014 Indian general election and parts of both the 2020 and 2021 season were played in the country due to the widespread outbreak of COVID-19 in India.

== The Sachin Tendulkar Stand ==
In April 2023, On Sachin Tendulkar's 50th birthday, the West Stand at the iconic Sharjah Cricket Stadium has been renamed the 'Sachin Tendulkar Stand in a special ceremony in the UAE, honouring the Indian cricket legend.

== 2024 ICC Women's T20 World Cup ==
The venue hosted 11 group-stage matches (Semi-final) 2024 ICC Women's T20 World Cup

== Records ==
=== T20Is ===
- On 24 November 2013, Samiullah Shinwari took a five wicket haul against Kenya.
- On 25 October 2021, Mujeeb Ur Rahman took a five wicket haul against Scotland.
- On 6 November 2021, Kagiso Rabada took a hat-trick against England in a 2021 ICC Men's T20 World Cup's super 12 Match.

== See also ==
- List of Test cricket grounds
- Rashid Alleem Premier League
