= List of Asia Cup cricket records =

This is an overall list of statistics and records of the Asia Cup, which was a One Day International tournament until 2016, since when it has alternated with Twenty20 International tournament.

== One Day Internationals ==
=== Records and statistics ===
Batting
Highest score	(India) Virat Kohli v Pakistan	183 (2012)
Most hundreds	(Sri Lanka) Sanath Jayasuriya	6 (1990–2008)
Most runs in a tournament	(Sri Lanka) Sanath Jayasuriya	378 (2008)
Highest average	(India) Virat Kohli	61.83 (2010–2023)
Most Fours		139 (1990–2008)
Most fifties (and over)	(Sri Lanka) Kumar Sangakkara	12 (2004–2014)
Most sixes	(India) Rohit Sharma	28 (2008–2023)
Highest partnership	(India) K. L. Rahul & Virat Kohli (3rd wicket) v Pakistan	233* (2023)
Highest strike rate	(Pakistan) Azhar Mahmood	225.00 (2000)
Most ducks	(Bangladesh) Rubel Hossain	3 (2014–2018)
Most ducks	(Pakistan) Salman Butt	3 (2008–2010)
Most ducks	(Bangladesh) Aminul Islam	3 (1988–2000)
Most ducks	(Sri Lanka) Mahela Jayawardene	3 (2000–2014)
Bowling
Best bowling figures	(Sri Lanka) Ajantha Mendis	6/13 (2008)
Most wickets in a tournament	(Sri Lanka) Ajantha Mendis	17 (2008)
Most 5 wickets in an innings	(Sri Lanka) Lasith Malinga	3 (2004–2018)
Fielding
Most dismissals (wicket-keeper)	(India) Mahendra Singh Dhoni	36 (25 catches and 11 stumpings) (2008–2018)
Most dismissals (wicket-keeper)	(Sri Lanka) Kumar Sangakkara	36 (27 catches and 9 stumpings) (2004–2014)
Most catches (fielder)	(Sri Lanka) Mahela Jayawardene	15 (2000–2014)
Team
Highest score	Pakistan v Bangladesh	385/7 (2010)
Lowest score	Sri Lanka v India	50 (2023)
Individual
Most matches	(Sri Lanka) Mahela Jayawardene	28 (2000–2014)
Most matches	(India) Rohit Sharma	28 (2008–2023)
Most matches as captain	(India) Mahendra Singh Dhoni	14 (2008–2018)
Most matches as an umpire	(New Zealand) Billy Bowden	14 (2004–2014)

=== Most runs ===
Runs	Player	Mat	Inn	HS	Avg	100s	50s	Period
1,220	(Sri Lanka) Sanath Jayasuriya	25	24	130	53.04	6	3	1990–2008
1,075	(Sri Lanka) Kumar Sangakkara	26	23	121	48.86	4	8	2004–2014
971	(India) Sachin Tendulkar	23	21	114	51.10	2	7	1990–2012
939	(India) Rohit Sharma †	27	26	111*	46.95	1	9	2008–2023
830	(Bangladesh) Mushfiqur Rahim †	25	25	144	36.08	2	3	2000–2023
Last updated: 15 September 2023

=== Most wickets ===
Player	Team	Matches	Wickets	Overs	Runs	Econ.	Ave.	BBI	4WI	5WI	Span
Muttiah Muralitharan	Sri Lanka	24	30	230.2	865	3.75	28.83	5/31	1	1	1995–2010
Lasith Malinga	Sri Lanka	14	29	128.1	596	4.65	20.55	5/34	1	3	2004–2018
Ajantha Mendis	Sri Lanka	8	26	68.0	271	3.98	10.42	6/13	2	2	2008–2014
Saeed Ajmal	Pakistan	12	25	115.0	485	4.21	19.40	3/26	0	0	2008–2014
Ravindra Jadeja	India	20	25	151.1	657	4.34	26.28	4/29	2	0	2010–2023 †
Last updated: 15 September 2023

=== Most runs in the tournament ===
Year	Player	Performance details
1984	(India) Surinder Khanna	107 runs
1986	(Sri Lanka) Arjuna Ranatunga	105 runs
1988	(Pakistan) Ijaz Ahmed	192 runs
1990/91	(Sri Lanka) Arjuna Ranatunga	166 runs
1995	(India) Sachin Tendulkar	205 runs
1997	(Sri Lanka) Arjuna Ranatunga	272 runs
2000	(Pakistan) Mohammad Yousuf	295 runs
2004	(Pakistan) Shoaib Malik	316 runs
2008	(Sri Lanka) Sanath Jayasuriya	378 runs
2010	(Pakistan) Shahid Afridi	265 runs
2012	(India) Virat Kohli	357 runs
2014	(Sri Lanka) Lahiru Thirimanne	279 runs
2018	(India) Shikhar Dhawan	342 runs
2023	(India) Shubman Gill	302 runs

=== Most wickets in the tournament ===
Year	Player	Performance details
1984	(India) Ravi Shastri	4 wickets
1986	(Pakistan) Abdul Qadir	9 wickets
1988	(India) Arshad Ayub	9 wickets
1990/91	(India) Kapil Dev	9 wickets
1995	(India) Anil Kumble	7 wickets
1997	(India) Venkatesh Prasad	7 wickets
2000	(Pakistan) Abdul Razzaq	8 wickets
2004	(India) Irfan Pathan	14 wickets
2008	(Sri Lanka) Ajantha Mendis	17 wickets
2010	(Sri Lanka) Lasith Malinga	9 wickets
2012	(Pakistan) Umar Gul	9 wickets
2014	(Sri Lanka) Lasith Malinga (Pakistan) Saeed Ajmal	11 wickets
2018	(Afghanistan) Rashid Khan (Bangladesh) Mustafizur Rahman (India) Kuldeep Yadav	10 wickets
2023	(Sri Lanka) Matheesha Pathirana	11 wickets

=== Man of the tournament ===
Year	Player	Performance details
1984	(India) Surinder Khanna	107 runs
1986	(Sri Lanka) Arjuna Ranatunga	105 runs
1988	(India) Navjot Sidhu	179 runs
1990/91	Not Awarded	--
1995	(India) Navjot Sidhu	197 runs
1997	(Sri Lanka) Arjuna Ranatunga	272 runs
2000	(Pakistan) Mohammad Yousuf	295 runs
2004	(Sri Lanka) Sanath Jayasuriya	293 runs and 4 wickets
2008	(Sri Lanka) Ajantha Mendis	17 wickets
2010	(Pakistan) Shahid Afridi	265 runs and 3 wickets
2012	(Bangladesh) Shakib Al Hasan	237 runs and 6 wickets
2014	(Sri Lanka) Lahiru Thirimanne	279 runs
2018	(India) Shikhar Dhawan	342 runs
2023	(India) Kuldeep Yadav	9 wickets

=== Man of the match (in final) ===
Year	Player	Performance details
1984	No Final Played	—
1986	(Pakistan) Javed Miandad	67 runs
1988	(India) Navjot Sidhu	76 runs
1990/91	(India) Mohammad Azharuddin	54 runs
1995	(India) Mohammad Azharuddin	90 runs
1997	(Sri Lanka) Marvan Atapattu	84 runs
2000	(Pakistan) Moin Khan	56 runs
2004	(Sri Lanka) Marvan Atapattu	65 runs
2008	(Sri Lanka) Ajantha Mendis	6 wickets
2010	(India) Dinesh Karthik	66 runs
2012	(Pakistan) Shahid Afridi	32 runs and 1 wicket
2014	(Sri Lanka) Lasith Malinga	5 wickets
2018	(Bangladesh) Liton Das	121 runs
2023	(India) Mohammed Siraj	6 wickets

== Twenty20 Internationals ==
=== Records and statistics ===
Batting
Most runs	(Sri Lanka) Pathum Nissanka	434 (2022–2025)
Highest score	(India) Virat Kohli vs Afghanistan	122* (2022)
Highest score	(Hong Kong) Babar Hayat vs Oman	122 (2016)
Most sixes	(India) Abhishek Sharma	19 (2025)
Most ducks	(Pakistan) Saim Ayub (Sri Lanka) Kusal Mendis	4
Most hundreds	(Hong Kong) Babar Hayat (India) Virat Kohli (Sri Lanka) Pathum Nissanka	1
Highest strike rate (Minimum 125 balls)	(India) Abhishek Sharma	200.00 (2025)
Highest strike rate in an inning (Minimum 20 balls)	(Afghanistan) Mohammad Nabi v Sri Lanka	272.72 (2025)
Highest partnership	(Sri Lanka) Pathum Nissanka & Kusal Perera (2nd wicket) v India	127 (2025)
Bowling
Most wickets	(India) Kuldeep Yadav (Pakistan) Haris Rauf (Sri Lanka) Wanindu Hasaranga	17
Best bowling figures	(India) Bhuvneshwar Kumar v Afghanistan	5/4 (2022)
Most wickets in a tournament	(India) Kuldeep Yadav	17 (2025)
Most 5 wickets in an innings	(India) Bhuvneshwar Kumar	1 (2022)
Fielding
Most dismissals (wicket-keeper)	(Sri Lanka) Kusal Mendis	8 (7 catches and 1 stumping) (2022–2025)
Most catches (fielder)	(Hong Kong) Babar Hayat	9 (2016–2025)
Team
Highest score	India v Afghanistan	212/2 (2022)
Lowest score	Hong Kong v Pakistan	38/10 (2022)
Miscellaneous
Most matches	(Sri Lanka) Dasun Shanaka	16 (2016–2025)
Most matches as captain	(Pakistan) Salman Ali Agha (United Arab Emirates) Amjad Javed (India) Suryakumar Yadav	7
Most matches as an umpire	(Sri Lanka) Ruchira Palliyaguruge	12 (2016–2025)

=== Most runs ===
Runs	Player	Mat	Inn	HS	Avg	100s	50s	Period
434	(Sri Lanka) Pathum Nissanka	12	12	107	39.45	1	4	2022–2025
429	(India) Virat Kohli	10	9	122*	85.80	1	3	2016–2022
314	(India) Abhishek Sharma	7	7	75	44.85	0	3	2025
292	(Hong Kong) Babar Hayat	8	8	122	36.50	1	1	2016–2025
281	(Pakistan) Mohammad Rizwan	6	6	78*	56.20	0	3	2022–2022
Last updated: 28 September 2025

=== Highest individual scores ===
Runs	Player	Balls	4s	6s	SR	Opposition	Venue	Date
122*	(India) Virat Kohli	61	12	6	200.00	Afghanistan	Dubai International Stadium, Dubai	8 September 2022
122	(Hong Kong) Babar Hayat	60	9	7	203.33	Oman	Khan Shaheb Osman Ali Stadium, Fatullah	19 February 2016
107	(Sri Lanka) Pathum Nissanka	58	7	6	184.48	India	Dubai International Cricket Stadium, Dubai	26 September 2025
84	(Afghanistan) Rahmanullah Gurbaz	45	4	6	186.66	Sri Lanka	Sharjah Cricket Stadium, Sharjah	3 September 2022
83	(India) Rohit Sharma	55	7	3	150.90	Bangladesh	Sher-e-Bangla National Cricket Stadium, Mirpur	24 February 2016
Last updated: 26 September 2025

=== Highest average ===
Average	Player	Mat	Inn	NO	Runs	Span
85.80	(India) Virat Kohli	10	9	4	429	2016–2022
71.00	(India) Tilak Varma	7	6	3	213	2025–2025
57.66	(Bangladesh) Mahmudullah	7	7	4	173	2016–2022
56.20	(Pakistan) Mohammad Rizwan	6	6	1	281	2022–2022
47.75	(Sri Lanka) Bhanuka Rajapaksa	6	6	2	191	2022–2022
Qualification: At least 5 innings batted - Last updated: 28 September 2025

=== Most 50+ scores ===
50+ scores	Player	Mat	Inn	Runs	HS	100s	50s	Span
5	(Sri Lanka) Pathum Nissanka	12	12	434	107	1	4	2022–2025
4	(India) Virat Kohli	10	9	429	122*	1	3	2016–2022
3	(Pakistan) Mohammad Rizwan	6	6	281	78*	0	3	2022–2022
3	(India) Abhishek Sharma	7	7	314	75	0	3	2025–2025
3	(Sri Lanka) Kusal Mendis	11	11	277	74*	0	3	2022–2025
Last updated: 28 September 2025

=== Most wickets ===
Wickets	Players	Mat	Inn	BBI	Span
17	(India) Kuldeep Yadav	7	7	4/7	2025–2025
17	(Pakistan) Haris Rauf	11	11	3/29	2022–2025
17	(Sri Lanka) Wanindu Hasaranga	12	12	3/21	2022–2025
15	(India) Hardik Pandya	14	14	3/8	2016–2025
14	(Afghanistan) Rashid Khan	11	11	3/22	2022–2025
Last updated: 28 September 2025

=== Tournament statistics ===
==== General statistics by tournament ====
Year	Host	Champion	Winning captain	Most runs	Most wickets	Player of the match (Final)	Player of the tournament
2016	Bangladesh	India	(India) MS Dhoni	(Bangladesh) Sabbir Rahman (176)	(Bangladesh) Al-Amin Hossain (11)	(India) Shikhar Dhawan	(Bangladesh) Sabbir Rahman
2022	Sri Lanka	Sri Lanka	(Sri Lanka) Dasun Shanaka	(Pakistan) Mohammad Rizwan (281)	(India) Bhuvneshwar Kumar (11)	(Sri Lanka) Bhanuka Rajapaksa	(Sri Lanka) Wanindu Hasaranga
2025	United Arab Emirates	India	(India) Suryakumar Yadav	(India) Abhishek Sharma (314)	(India) Kuldeep Yadav (17)	(India) Tilak Varma	(India) Abhishek Sharma

==== Results of host teams ====
Year	Host	Finish
2016	Bangladesh	Runners-up
2022	Sri Lanka	Champions
2025	United Arab Emirates	Group stage

== See also ==
- List of Asia Cup centuries
- List of Asia Cup five-wicket hauls
- Women's Asia Cup
