= List of Asia Cup five-wicket hauls =

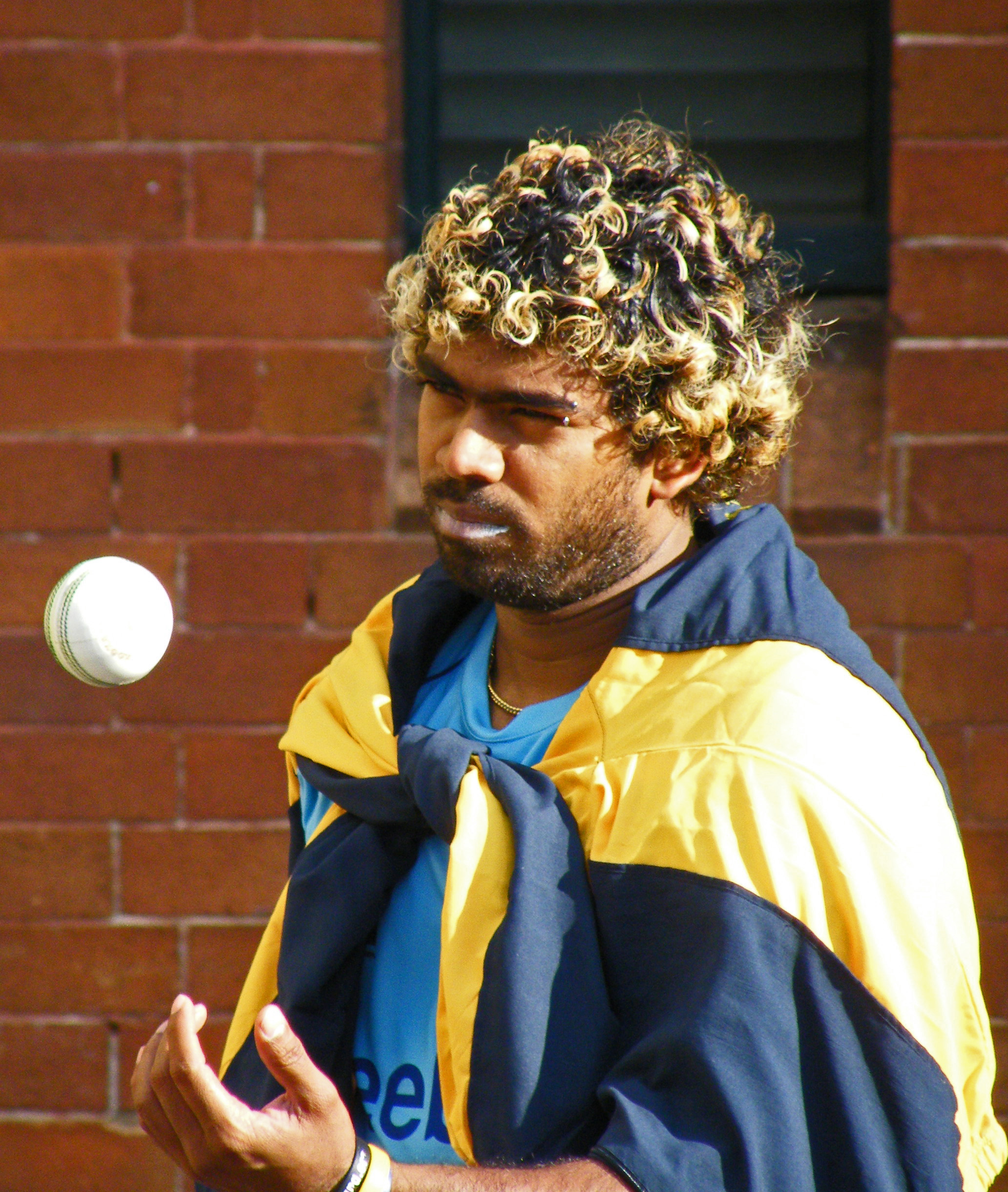
Lasith Malinga has taken three five-wicket hauls, the most by any bowler in Asia Cup matches.

In cricket, a five-wicket haul (also known as a "five–for" or "fifer") refers to a bowler taking five or more wickets in a single innings. There have been 16 instances of a bowler taking a five-wicket haul in Asia Cup games. (Note: Including T20Is) The Asia Cup is an either One Day International format (50 overs) and Twenty20 International cricket format (20 overs) tournament organised by the Asian Cricket Council, a subordinate of the International Cricket Council (ICC). Originally started as a biennial tournament in 1984, it has since been organised 16 times as of the latest edition in 2023. (Note: The 1993 edition which was scheduled to be played in Pakistan and the 2006 tournament scheduled to be held in India were cancelled.)

The first five-wicket haul in the tournament was taken by India's Arshad Ayub in the 1988 tournament—he took five wickets for 21 runs against Pakistan. In the 1995 edition, Pakistan's Aaqib Javed took five wickets for 19 runs against India. These two bowling figures feature in the "Top 100 ODI bowling performances of all time", a list compiled and released by the Wisden Cricketers' Almanack in 2002. No five-wicket hauls were taken in the 1990–91, 2000 and 2004 tournaments.

The Sri Lankans lead the list with nine five-wicket hauls—Ajantha Mendis and Lasith Malinga are the only bowlers to have taken more than one five-wicket haul in the tournament's history. The former achieved the feat two times, both in 2008, while the latter has done it three times—once in the 2010 tournament and two times in 2014. Mendis' six wickets for 13 runs against India in the final of the 2008 edition is the best by any bowler across all tournaments. India's Bhuvneshwar Kumar is the only bowler to have five-wicket haul in T20 Asia Cup.

== Key ==
- Inn – The innings of the match in which the five-wicket haul was taken
- Overs – Overs bowled in the innings
- Runs – Runs conceded in the innings
- Wkts – Batsmen whose wickets were taken in the innings
- Econ – Runs conceded per over
- Won – The match was won by the bowler's team
- Lost – The match was lost by the bowler's team
- Tied – The match ended in a tie

== Five-wicket hauls ==
Asia Cup five-wicket hauls
No.	Bowler	Date	Team	Opponent	Venue	Inn	Overs	Runs	Wkts	Econ	Batsmen	Result
1	Arshad Ayub	31 October 1988	India	Pakistan	Bangabandhu National Stadium, Dhaka, Bangladesh	1	9	21	5	2.33	Rameez Raja; Aamer Malik; Shoaib Mohammad; Naved Anjum; Wasim Akram	Won
2	Aaqib Javed	7 April 1995	Pakistan	India	Sharjah Cricket Association Stadium, Sharjah, United Arab Emirates	2	9	19	5	2.11	Manoj Prabhakar; Sachin Tendulkar; Mohammad Azharuddin; Vinod Kambli; Javagal Srinath	Won
3	Saqlain Mushtaq	16 July 1997	Pakistan	Bangladesh	R. Premadasa Stadium, Colombo, Sri Lanka	2	9.3	38	5	4.00	Athar Ali Khan; Aminul Islam Bulbul; Akram Khan; Khaled Mashud; Saiful Islam	Won
4	Ajantha Mendis (1/2)	26 June 2008	Sri Lanka	United Arab Emirates	Gaddafi Stadium, Lahore, Pakistan	2	6.3	22	5	3.38	Saqib Ali; Nizel Fernandes; Alawi Shukri; Fahad Alhashmi; Aman Ali	Won
5	Sohail Tanvir	29 June 2008	Pakistan	Sri Lanka	National Stadium, Karachi, Pakistan	1	10	48	5	4.80	Sanath Jayasuriya; Kumar Sangakkara; Mahela Jayawardene; Chamara Silva; Thilan Thushara	Lost
6	Muttiah Muralitharan	30 June 2008	Sri Lanka	Bangladesh	National Stadium, Karachi, Pakistan	2	10	31	5	3.10	Raqibul Hasan; Mushfiqur Rahim; Alok Kapali; Abdur Razzak; Mashrafe Mortaza	Won
7	Ajantha Mendis (2/2)	6 July 2008	Sri Lanka	India	National Stadium, Karachi, Pakistan	2	8	13	6	1.62	Virender Sehwag; Suresh Raina; Yuvraj Singh; Rohit Sharma; Irfan Pathan; RP Singh	Won
8	Lasith Malinga (1/3)	15 June 2010	Sri Lanka	Pakistan	Rangiri Dambulla International Stadium, Dambulla, Sri Lanka	1	10	34	5	3.40	Salman Butt; Umar Amin; Mohammad Amir; Shoaib Akhtar; Mohammad Asif	Won
9	Farveez Maharoof	22 June 2010	Sri Lanka	India	Rangiri Dambulla International Stadium, Dambulla, Sri Lanka	1	10	42	5	4.20	Virat Kohli; Ravindra Jadeja; Praveen Kumar; Zaheer Khan; Ashok Dinda	Won
10	Lasith Malinga (2/3)	25 February 2014	Sri Lanka	Pakistan	Khan Shaheb Osman Ali Stadium, Fatullah, Bangladesh	1	9.5	52	5	5.28	Misbah-ul-Haq; Shahid Afridi; Bilawal Bhatti; Umar Gul; Saeed Ajmal	Won
11	Lasith Malinga (3/3)	8 March 2014	Sri Lanka	Pakistan	Shere Bangla National Stadium, Dhaka, Bangladesh	1	10	56	5	5.60	Sharjeel Khan; Ahmed Shehzad; Mohammad Hafeez; Misbah-ul-Haq; Umar Akmal	Won
12	Thisara Perera	17 September 2018	Sri Lanka	Afghanistan	Sheikh Zayed Cricket Stadium, Abu Dhabi, UAE	1	9	55	5	6.11	Hashmatullah Shahidi; Najibullah Zadran; Gulbadin Naib; Rashid Khan; Mujeeb Ur Rahman	Lost
13	Kuldeep Yadav	10 September 2023	India	Pakistan	R. Premadasa Stadium, Colombo, Sri Lanka	2	8	25	5	3.12	Fakhar Zaman; Salman Ali Agha; Iftikhar Ahmed; Shadab Khan; Faheem Ashraf	Won
14	Dunith Wellalage	12 September 2023	Sri Lanka	India	R. Premadasa Stadium, Colombo, Sri Lanka	1	10	40	5	4.00	Rohit Sharma; Shubman Gill; Virat Kohli; K. L. Rahul; Hardik Pandya	Lost
15	Mohammed Siraj	17 September 2023	India	Sri Lanka	R. Premadasa Stadium, Colombo, Sri Lanka	1	7	21	6	3.00	Pathum Nissanka; Kusal Mendis; Sadeera Samarawickrama; Charith Asalanka; Dhananjaya de Silva; Dasun Shanaka	Won

== Five-wicket hauls (T20I) ==
Asia Cup five-wicket hauls (T20)
No.	Bowler	Date	Team	Opponent	Venue	Inn	Overs	Runs	Wkts	Econ	Batsmen	Result
1	Bhuvneshwar Kumar	8 September 2022	India	Afghanistan	Dubai International Cricket Stadium, Dubai	1	4	4	5	1.0	Hazratullah Zazai; Rahmanullah Gurbaz; Karim Janat; Najibullah Zadran; Azmatullah Omarzai	Won
Updated: 11 September 2022

== Bibliography ==
- Pervez, M.A. (2001). A Dictionary of Cricket. Universities Press. ISBN 978-81-7370-184-9.
