= 2027 Asia Cup =

- Dates: 18 June – 4 July 2027
- Administrator: Asian Cricket Council
- Cricket format: One Day International
- Tournament format(s): Group stage and Knockout
- Host: Bangladesh
- Participants: 6
- Matches: 13
- Official website: asiancricket.org

The 2027 Asia Cup, also known as the Men's Asia Cup 2027, will be the 18th edition of the Asia Cup, a cricket tournament organised by the Asian Cricket Council (ACC). It is scheduled to be held in Bangladesh from 18 June to 4 July 2027, and will be played in the One Day International (ODI) format.

== Background ==
The Asia Cup is played in alternating formats. The 2023 Asia Cup was played in ODI format and co-hosted by Pakistan and Sri Lanka while the 2025 Asia Cup was played as a T20I tournament. Hence, the 2027 edition will revert to the ODI format.

The 2025 edition was expanded from six to eight teams for the T20I format, before reverting to the six-team format for the ODI edition.

=== Format ===
The tournament will be following the same format as the 2018 and 2023 editions. The six will be divided into two groups of three. Each team plays the other two teams in its group once. The top two teams from each group advance to the Super 4. The top two teams from the Super 4 stage advance to the final.

=== Host selection ===
Bangladesh was confirmed as the host nation in July 2026. This will be the sixth time Bangladesh hosts the tournament, after 1988, 2000, 2012, 2014, and 2016.

== Teams and qualification ==
Qualified directly as an ICC full member Qualified via 2026 Premier Cup Participated in the qualification but failed to qualify Withdrew from qualification ACC members that did not enter qualification

Six teams will participate in the tournament. Five full members of the ACC qualified automatically. Nepal qualified as the sixth team through the 2026 ACC Men's Premier Cup.

Means of qualification	Date	Hosts	Berth(s)	Qualified
Full Member Nations	—N/a	—N/a	5	Afghanistan
Full Member Nations	—N/a	—N/a	5	Bangladesh
Full Member Nations	—N/a	—N/a	5	India
Full Member Nations	—N/a	—N/a	5	Pakistan
Full Member Nations	—N/a	—N/a	5	Sri Lanka
2026 ACC Premier Cup	12 September 2026	Malaysia	1	Nepal
Total			6	

== Venues ==
The following stadiums in Bangladesh are expected to host matches:

Stadium	City	Capacity	Matches
Sher-e-Bangla National Cricket Stadium	Mirpur	25,416	TBD
BSFL Matiur Rahman Stadium	Chattogram	22,000	TBD
Sylhet International Cricket Stadium	Sylhet	18,500	TBD

== See also ==
- Asia Cup
- Cricket in Bangladesh
