= List of Asia Cup centuries =

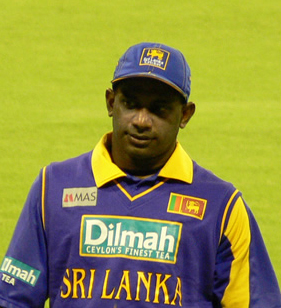
Sanath Jayasuriya has scored more centuries than any other player in the tournament.

In cricket, a player is said to have scored a century when he scores 100 or more runs in a single innings. The Asia Cup is an either One Day International format (50 overs) and Twenty20 International cricket format (20 overs) tournament organised by the Asian Cricket Council, a subordinate of the International Cricket Council (ICC). Originally started as a biennial tournament in 1984, it has since been organised 16 times as of the latest edition in 2023. (Note: The 1993 edition which was scheduled to be played in Pakistan was cancelled.) (Note: Including T20Is) Since its inception, a total of 62 centuries have been scored by 41 different players. India has scored the most centuries with 20.

The first player to score a century in the tournament was Pakistan's Moin-ul-Atiq, who made 105 against Bangladesh in 1988. In the same match, his teammate Ijaz Ahmed scored 124*.

Sri Lanka's Sanath Jayasuriya holds the record for the most with six centuries, followed by India's Virat Kohli with five. Kohli's 183 against Pakistan in 2012 is the highest individual score in the tournament. Sri Lanka's Kumar Sangakkara scored three centuries in the 2008 tournament, a record for a single edition. The 2008 edition saw 13 centuries—the highest for a tournament—while no centuries were made in 1984 and 1986.

== Key ==
| Symbol | Meaning |
|---|---|
| Runs | Number of runs scored |
| * | Batsman remained not out |
| † | Scored at home venue |
| ‡ | Scored in a final |
| Balls | Number of balls faced |
| 4s | Number of fours hit |
| 6s | Number of sixes hit |
| S/R | Strike rate (Runs scored per 100 balls) |
| D/L | The result was decided by Duckworth–Lewis method |

== ODI Centuries ==
List of Asia Cup ODI centuries
| No. | Player | Runs | Balls | 4s | 6s | S/R | Team | Opposition | Venue | Date | Result | Ref |
|---|---|---|---|---|---|---|---|---|---|---|---|---|
| 1 | Moin-ul-Atiq | 105 | 117 | – | – | 89.74 | Pakistan | Bangladesh | M. A. Aziz Stadium, Chittagong | 29 October 1988 | Won | |
| 2 | Ijaz Ahmed | 124* | 87 | 9 | 4 | 142.52 | Pakistan | Bangladesh | M. A. Aziz Stadium, Chittagong | 29 October 1988 | Won | |
| 3 | Navjot Singh Sidhu | 104* | 109 | 10 | 3 | 95.41 | India | Bangladesh | Sector 16 Stadium, Chandigarh | 25 December 1990 | Won | |
| 4 | Sachin Tendulkar | 112* | 107 | 15 | 1 | 104.67 | India | Sri Lanka | Sharjah Cricket Association Stadium, Sharjah | 9 December 1995 | Won | |
| 5 | Arjuna Ranatunga | 131* † | 152 | 17 | 0 | 86.18 | Sri Lanka | India | R. Premadasa Stadium, Colombo | 18 July 1997 | Won | |
| 6 | Sanath Jayasuriya | 108 † | 83 | 14 | 3 | 130.12 | Sri Lanka | Bangladesh | Sinhalese Sports Club Ground, Colombo | 22 July 1997 | Won | |
| 7 | Sourav Ganguly | 135* | 124 | 6 | 7 | 108.87 | India | Bangladesh | Bangabandhu National Stadium, Dhaka | 30 May 2000 | Won | |
| 8 | Sanath Jayasuriya | 105 | 116 | 11 | 0 | 90.51 | Sri Lanka | India | Bangabandhu National Stadium, Dhaka | 1 June 2000 | Won | |
| 9 | Yousuf Youhana | 100* | 112 | 9 | 1 | 89.28 | Pakistan | India | Bangabandhu National Stadium, Dhaka | 3 June 2000 | Won | |
| 10 | Marvan Atapattu | 100 | 124 | 9 | 0 | 80.64 | Sri Lanka | Pakistan | Bangabandhu National Stadium, Dhaka | 7 June 2000 | Lost | |
| 11 | Rahul Dravid | 104 | 93 | 8 | 0 | 111.82 | India | United Arab Emirates | Rangiri Dambulla International Stadium, Dambulla | 16 July 2004 | Won | |
| 12 | Yasir Hameed | 102 | 123 | 10 | 0 | 82.92 | Pakistan | Bangladesh | Sinhalese Sports Club Ground, Colombo | 17 July 2004 | Won | |
| 13 | Shoaib Malik | 118 | 110 | 10 | 2 | 107.27 | Pakistan | Hong Kong | Sinhalese Sports Club Ground, Colombo | 18 July 2004 | Won (D/L) | |
| 14 | Younis Khan | 144 | 122 | 8 | 3 | 118.03 | Pakistan | Hong Kong | Sinhalese Sports Club Ground, Colombo | 18 July 2004 | Won (D/L) | |
| 15 | Sanath Jayasuriya | 107* † | 101 | 11 | 0 | 105.94 | Sri Lanka | Bangladesh | R. Premadasa Stadium, Colombo | 23 July 2004 | Won | |
| 16 | Shoaib Malik | 143 | 127 | 18 | 1 | 112.59 | Pakistan | India | R. Premadasa Stadium, Colombo | 25 July 2004 | Won | |
| 17 | Sanath Jayasuriya | 130 † | 132 | 14 | 1 | 98.48 | Sri Lanka | India | R. Premadasa Stadium, Colombo | 27 July 2004 | Lost | |
| 18 | Mohammad Ashraful | 109 | 126 | 8 | 0 | 86.50 | Bangladesh | United Arab Emirates | Gaddafi Stadium, Lahore | 24 June 2008 | Won | |
| 19 | Kumar Sangakkara | 101 | 91 | 16 | 0 | 110.98 | Sri Lanka | Bangladesh | Gaddafi Stadium, Lahore | 25 June 2008 | Won | |
| 20 | Mahendra Singh Dhoni | 109* | 96 | 6 | 6 | 113.54 | India | Hong Kong | National Stadium, Karachi | 25 June 2008 | Won | |
| 21 | Suresh Raina | 101 | 68 | 7 | 5 | 148.52 | India | Hong Kong | National Stadium, Karachi | 25 June 2008 | Won | |
| 22 | Shoaib Malik | 125* † | 119 | 16 | 1 | 105.04 | Pakistan | India | National Stadium, Karachi | 26 June 2008 | Lost | |
| 23 | Virender Sehwag | 119 | 95 | 12 | 5 | 125.26 | India | Pakistan | National Stadium, Karachi | 26 June 2008 | Won | |
| 24 | Alok Kapali | 115 | 96 | 10 | 5 | 119.79 | Bangladesh | India | National Stadium, Karachi | 28 June 2008 | Lost | |
| 25 | Suresh Raina | 116* | 107 | 11 | 3 | 108.41 | India | Bangladesh | National Stadium, Karachi | 28 June 2008 | Won | |
| 26 | Kumar Sangakkara | 112 | 110 | 10 | 1 | 101.81 | Sri Lanka | Pakistan | National Stadium, Karachi | 29 June 2008 | Won | |
| 27 | Sanath Jayasuriya | 130 | 88 | 16 | 6 | 147.72 | Sri Lanka | Bangladesh | National Stadium, Karachi | 30 June 2008 | Won | |
| 28 | Kumar Sangakkara | 121 | 128 | 16 | 1 | 94.53 | Sri Lanka | Bangladesh | National Stadium, Karachi | 30 June 2008 | Won | |
| 29 | Younis Khan | 123* † | 117 | 11 | 1 | 105.12 | Pakistan | India | National Stadium, Karachi | 2 July 2008 | Won | |
| 30 | Sanath Jayasuriya | 125 ‡ | 114 | 9 | 5 | 109.64 | Sri Lanka | India | National Stadium, Karachi | 6 July 2008 | Won | |
| 31 | Shahid Afridi | 109 | 76 | 8 | 7 | 143.42 | Pakistan | Sri Lanka | Rangiri Dambulla International Stadium, Dambulla | 15 June 2010 | Lost | |
| 32 | Shahid Afridi | 124 | 60 | 17 | 4 | 206.66 | Pakistan | Bangladesh | Rangiri Dambulla International Stadium, Dambulla | 21 June 2010 | Won | |
| 33 | Gautam Gambhir | 100 | 118 | 7 | 0 | 84.74 | India | Sri Lanka | Sher-e-Bangla National Stadium, Mirpur | 13 March 2012 | Won | |
| 34 | Virat Kohli | 108 | 120 | 7 | 0 | 90.00 | India | Sri Lanka | Sher-e-Bangla National Stadium, Mirpur | 13 March 2012 | Won | |
| 35 | Sachin Tendulkar | 114 | 147 | 12 | 1 | 77.55 | India | Bangladesh | Sher-e-Bangla National Stadium, Mirpur | 16 March 2012 | Lost | |
| 36 | Mohammad Hafeez | 105 | 113 | 9 | 1 | 92.92 | Pakistan | India | Sher-e-Bangla National Stadium, Mirpur | 18 March 2012 | Lost | |
| 37 | Nasir Jamshed | 112 | 104 | 10 | 1 | 107.69 | Pakistan | India | Sher-e-Bangla National Stadium, Mirpur | 18 March 2012 | Lost | |
| 38 | Virat Kohli | 183 ‡ | 148 | 22 | 1 | 123.64 | India | Pakistan | Sher-e-Bangla National Stadium, Mirpur | 18 March 2012 | Won | |
| 39 | Lahiru Thirimanne | 102 | 110 | 11 | 1 | 92.72 | Sri Lanka | Pakistan | Khan Shaheb Osman Ali Stadium, Fatullah | 25 February 2014 | Won | |
| 40 | Mushfiqur Rahim | 117 † | 113 | 7 | 2 | 103.53 | Bangladesh | India | Khan Shaheb Osman Ali Stadium, Fatullah | 26 February 2014 | Lost | |
| 41 | Virat Kohli | 136 | 122 | 16 | 2 | 111.47 | India | Bangladesh | Khan Shaheb Osman Ali Stadium, Fatullah | 26 February 2014 | Won | |
| 42 | Umar Akmal | 102* | 89 | 7 | 3 | 114.60 | Pakistan | Afghanistan | Khan Shaheb Osman Ali Stadium, Fatullah | 27 February 2014 | Won | |
| 43 | Kumar Sangakkara | 103 | 84 | 12 | 1 | 122.61 | Sri Lanka | India | Khan Shaheb Osman Ali Stadium, Fatullah | 28 February 2014 | Won | |
| 44 | Anamul Haque Bijoy | 100 † | 132 | 6 | 4 | 75.75 | Bangladesh | Pakistan | Sher-e-Bangla National Stadium, Mirpur | 4 March 2014 | Lost | |
| 45 | Ahmed Shehzad | 103 | 123 | 12 | 1 | 83.73 | Pakistan | Bangladesh | Sher-e-Bangla National Stadium, Mirpur | 4 March 2014 | Won | |
| 46 | Fawad Alam | 114* ‡ | 134 | 8 | 3 | 85.07 | Pakistan | Sri Lanka | Sher-e-Bangla National Stadium, Mirpur | 8 March 2014 | Lost | |
| 47 | Lahiru Thirimanne | 101 ‡ | 108 | 13 | 0 | 93.51 | Sri Lanka | Pakistan | Sher-e-Bangla National Stadium, Mirpur | 8 March 2014 | Won | |
| 48 | Mushfiqur Rahim | 144 | 150 | 11 | 4 | 96.00 | Bangladesh | Sri Lanka | Dubai International Cricket Stadium, Dubai | 15 September 2018 | Won | |
| 49 | Shikhar Dhawan | 127 | 120 | 15 | 2 | 105.83 | India | Hong Kong | Dubai International Cricket Stadium, Dubai | 18 September 2018 | Won | |
| 50 | Shikhar Dhawan | 114 | 100 | 16 | 2 | 114.00 | India | Pakistan | Dubai International Cricket Stadium, Dubai | 23 September 2018 | Won | |
| 51 | Rohit Sharma | 111* | 119 | 7 | 4 | 93.28 | India | Pakistan | Dubai International Cricket Stadium, Dubai | 23 September 2018 | Won | |
| 52 | Mohammad Shahzad | 124 | 116 | 11 | 7 | 106.89 | Afghanistan | India | Dubai International Cricket Stadium, Dubai | 25 September 2018 | Tied | |
| 53 | Liton Das | 121 ‡ | 117 | 12 | 2 | 103.41 | Bangladesh | India | Dubai International Cricket Stadium, Dubai | 28 September 2018 | Lost | |
| 54 | Babar Azam | 151 ‡ | 131 | 14 | 4 | 115.26 | Pakistan | Nepal | Multan Cricket Stadium, Multan | 30 August 2023 | Won | |
| 55 | Iftikhar Ahmed | 109 | 71 | 11 | 4 | 153.52 | Pakistan | Nepal | Multan Cricket Stadium, Multan | 30 August 2023 | Won | |
| 56 | Mehidy Hasan | 112 | 119 | 7 | 3 | 94.11 | Bangladesh | Afghanistan | Gaddafi Stadium, Lahore | 3 September 2023 | Won | |
| 57 | Najmul Hossain Shanto | 104 | 105 | 9 | 2 | 99.04 | Bangladesh | Afghanistan | Gaddafi Stadium, Lahore | 3 September 2023 | Won | |
| 58 | K. L. Rahul | 111* | 106 | 12 | 2 | 104.71 | India | Pakistan | R. Premadasa Stadium, Colombo | 11 September 2023 | Won | |
| 59 | Virat Kohli | 122* | 94 | 9 | 3 | 129.78 | India | Pakistan | R. Premadasa Stadium, Colombo | 11 September 2023 | Won | |
| 60 | Shubman Gill | 121 | 133 | 8 | 5 | 90.97 | India | Bangladesh | R. Premadasa Stadium, Colombo | 15 September 2023 | Lost | |

== T20I Centuries ==
List of Asia Cup T20I centuries
| No. | Player | Runs | Balls | 4s | 6s | S/R | Team | Opposition | Venue | Date | Result | Ref |
|---|---|---|---|---|---|---|---|---|---|---|---|---|
| 1 | Babar Hayat | 122 | 60 | 9 | 7 | 203.33 | Hong Kong | Oman | Khan Shaheb Osman Ali Stadium, Fatullah | 19 February 2016 | Lost | |
| 2 | Virat Kohli | 122* | 61 | 12 | 6 | 200.00 | India | Afghanistan | Dubai International Cricket Stadium, Dubai | 8 September 2022 | Won | |
| 3 | Pathum Nissanka | 107 | 58 | 7 | 6 | 184.48 | Sri Lanka | India | Dubai International Cricket Stadium, Dubai | 26 September 2025 | Lost | |

== Bibliography ==
- Knight, Julian (2013). Cricket For Dummies. John Wiley & Sons. ISBN 978-1-118-48034-2.
