= 2012 Asia Cup =

Cricket tournament in Bangladesh

2012 Micromax Asia Cup
- Dates: 11 – 22 March 2012
- Administrator: Asian Cricket Council
- Cricket format: One Day International
- Tournament format(s): Round-robin, Knockout
- Host: Bangladesh
- Champions: Pakistan (2nd title)
- Runners-up: Bangladesh
- Participants: 4
- Matches: 7
- Player of the series: (Bangladesh) Shakib Al Hasan
- Most runs: (India) Virat Kohli (357)
- Most wickets: (Pakistan) Umar Gul (9)

The 2012 Asia Cup (also called Micromax Asia Cup) was the eleventh edition of the Asia cup cricket tournament held in Bangladesh from 11 to 22 March 2012. Like the previous event, the tournament featured the four Test-playing nations from Asia: Bangladesh, India, Pakistan and Sri Lanka. India entered the tournament as the defending 2010 Asia Cup champions. Pakistan won the tournament by beating Bangladesh in the final by 2 runs.

== Background ==
China was interested in hosting the Asia Cup at Guangzhou but the Asian Cricket Council decided that Bangladesh will host the event. It was the third time Bangladesh hosted the event after 1988 and 2000.

The event was supposed to be held between 1 and 11 March 2012, but was rescheduled to avoid a clash of dates with the ODI tri-series in Australia that also included Sri Lanka and India, which ended on 8 March. The tournament was played from 11 to 22 March.

== Venues ==
All 7 matches were played at the Sher-e-Bangla Cricket Stadium, Mirpur.

City	Venue	Capacity	Matches
Mirpur, Dhaka	Sher-e-Bangla Cricket Stadium	26,000	7

Venue in Bangladesh

== Squads ==
Bangladesh	India	Pakistan	Sri Lanka
Mushfiqur Rahim (c & wk); Mahmudullah (vc); Tamim Iqbal; Imrul Kayes; Nazimuddin; Jahurul Islam (wk); Anamul Haque (wk); Shakib Al Hasan; Nasir Hossain; Elias Sunny; Abdur Razzak; Mashrafe Mortaza; Shahadat Hossain; Nazmul Hossain; Shafiul Islam	MS Dhoni (c & wk); Virat Kohli (vc); Sachin Tendulkar; Gautam Gambhir; Suresh Raina; Rohit Sharma; Manoj Tiwary; Yusuf Pathan; Irfan Pathan; Ravindra Jadeja; Ravichandran Ashwin; Rahul Sharma; Praveen Kumar; Vinay Kumar; Ashok Dinda	Misbah-ul-Haq (c); Mohammad Hafeez; Nasir Jamshed; Younis Khan; Asad Shafiq; Umar Akmal; Azhar Ali; Shahid Afridi; Hammad Azam; Sarfraz Ahmed (wk); Saeed Ajmal; Abdur Rehman; Umar Gul; Wahab Riaz; Aizaz Cheema	Mahela Jayawardene (c); Tillakaratne Dilshan; Upul Tharanga; Kumar Sangakkara (wk); Dinesh Chandimal (wk); Lahiru Thirimanne; Chamara Kapugedera; Thisara Perera; Sachithra Senanayake; Seekkuge Prasanna; Farveez Maharoof; Nuwan Kulasekara; Lasith Malinga; Suranga Lakmal; Shaminda Eranga; Angelo Mathews (Note: Withdrawn on 14 March 2012 due to injury. Replaced with Shaminda Eranga.)

== Points table ==
Pos	Team	Pld	W	L	T	NR	BP	Pts	NRR	For	Against
1	Pakistan	3	2	1	0	0	1	9	0.444	780/139.5	759/147.5
2	Bangladesh	3	2	1	0	0	0	8	0.022	746/136.3	762/140
3	India	3	2	1	0	0	0	8	0.377	923/147.5	876/149.2
4	Sri Lanka	3	0	3	0	0	0	0	−0.887	653/140	705/127

Points system:

- Win: 4 points
- Loss: no points
- Tie/No result: 2 points
- Bonus point: If a team wins, with a run rate ≥ 1.25 times that of the opposing team, that team gets 1 bonus point. (A team's run rate is number of runs scored divided by number of overs faced, except that a team is treated as having faced the full 50 overs if it loses all of its wickets)

If two or more teams have the same number of points, the right to play in the final is determined as follows:

- The team having the higher number of wins.
- If two or more teams have same number of wins, the team with more wins against the other teams who have equal number of points and wins. (Head to head)
- If still equal, the team with the higher number of bonus points.
- If still equal, the team with the greater net run rate.

== Matches ==
=== Group stage matches ===
==== 1st Match ====
All times local (UTC+06:00)

11 March 2012
14:00 (D/N)
Scorecard

Pakistan; 262/8 (50 overs)	v	Bangladesh; 241 (48.1 overs)
Mohammad Hafeez 89 (126); Shahadat Hossain 3/53 (8 overs)		Shakib Al Hasan 64 (66); Umar Gul 3/58 (9.1 overs)

Pakistan won by 21 runs
Sher-e-Bangla Cricket Stadium, Mirpur Thana
Umpires: Ian Gould (Eng) and Paul Reiffel (Aus)
Player of the match: Mohammad Hafeez (Pak)

- Bangladesh won the toss and elected to field.

==== 2nd Match ====
13 March 2012
14:00 (D/N)
Scorecard

India; 304/3 (50 overs)	v	Sri Lanka; 254 (45.1 overs)
Virat Kohli 108 (120); Farveez Maharoof 2/57 (10 overs)		Mahela Jayawardene 78 (59); Irfan Pathan 4/32 (8.1 overs)

India won by 50 runs
Sher-e-Bangla Cricket Stadium, Mirpur Thana
Umpires: Steve Davis (Aus) and Ian Gould (Eng)
Player of the match: Virat Kohli (Ind)

- Sri Lanka won the toss and elected to field.

==== 3rd Match ====
15 March 2012
14:00 (D/N)
Scorecard

Sri Lanka; 188 (45.4 overs)	v	Pakistan; 189/4 (39.5 overs)
Kumar Sangakkara 71 (92); Aizaz Cheema 4/43 (9 overs)		Umar Akmal 77 (72); Suranga Lakmal 2/37 (8 overs)

Pakistan won by 6 wickets
Sher-e-Bangla Cricket Stadium, Mirpur Thana
Umpires: Steve Davis (Aus) and Paul Reiffel (Aus)
Player of the match: Aizaz Cheema (Pak)

- Sri Lanka won the toss and elected to bat.
- Pakistan earned a bonus point.

==== 4th Match ====
16 March 2012
14:00 (D/N)
Scorecard

India; 289/5 (50 overs)	v	Bangladesh; 293/5 (49.2 overs)
Sachin Tendulkar 114 (147); Mashrafe Mortaza 2/44 (10 overs)		Tamim Iqbal 70 (99); Praveen Kumar 3/56 (10 overs)

Bangladesh won by 5 wickets
Sher-e-Bangla Cricket Stadium, Mirpur Thana
Umpires: Ian Gould (Eng) and Paul Reiffel (Aus)
Player of the match: Shakib Al Hasan (Ban)

- Bangladesh won the toss and elected to field.
- Sachin Tendulkar (Ind) became the first batsman to score 100 centuries in international cricket.

==== 5th Match ====
18 March 2012
14:00 (D/N)
Scorecard

Pakistan; 329/6 (50 overs)	v	India; 330/4 (47.5 overs)
Nasir Jamshed 112 (104); Ashok Dinda 2/47 (8 overs)		Virat Kohli 183 (148); Mohammad Hafeez 1/42 (9 overs)

India won by 6 wickets
Sher-e-Bangla Cricket Stadium, Mirpur Thana
Umpires: Steve Davis (Aus) and Ian Gould (Eng)
Player of the match: Virat Kohli (Ind)

- Pakistan won the toss and elected to bat.
- Virat Kohli's score was the highest individual innings for a batsman in the Asia Cup.
- Virat Kohli's innings was the highest individual innings for a batsman against Pakistan in an ODI.
- Nasir Jamshed and Mohammad Hafeez's opening partnership of 224 is a record for Pakistan versus India.
- Sachin Tendulkar, Yusuf Pathan and Praveen Kumar (Ind) played in their last ODI match

==== 6th Match ====
20 March 2012
14:00 (D/N)
Scorecard

Sri Lanka; 232 (49.5 overs)	v	Bangladesh; 212/5 (37.1 overs)
Chamara Kapugedera 62 (92); Nazmul Hossain 3/32 (8 overs)		Tamim Iqbal 59 (57); Nuwan Kulasekara 2/30 (6 overs)

Bangladesh won by 5 wickets (D/L method)
Sher-e-Bangla Cricket Stadium, Mirpur Thana
Umpires: Steve Davis (Aus) and Paul Reiffel (Aus)
Player of the match: Shakib Al Hasan (Ban)

- Bangladesh won the toss and elected to field.
- Rain reduced Bangladesh's innings to 40 overs, target revised to 212 by Duckworth-Lewis method.
- Bangladesh qualified for the finals for the first time due to head to head record against India and this is the first time that Sri Lanka failed to eligible to Asian cup finals since 1984

=== Final ===
22 March 2012
14:00 (D/N)
Scorecard

Pakistan; 236/9 (50 overs)	v	Bangladesh; 234/8 (50 overs)
Sarfraz Ahmed 46* (52); Abdur Razzak 2/26 (10 overs)		Shakib Al Hasan 68 (72); Aizaz Cheema 3/46 (7 overs)

Pakistan won by 2 runs
Sher-e-Bangla Cricket Stadium, Mirpur Thana
Umpires: Steve Davis (Aus) and Ian Gould (Eng)
Player of the match: Shahid Afridi (Pak)

- Bangladesh won the toss and elected to field.
- Pakistan won the Asia Cup for the second time (first in 2000).
- Tamim Iqbal became the first Bangladesh player to score four consecutive ODI half-centuries.

== Records and statistics ==
=== Batting ===
Player	Team	Matches	Runs	Average	SR	HS	100s	50s
Virat Kohli	India	3	357	119	102	183	2	1
Tamim Iqbal	Bangladesh	4	253	63.25	80.831	70	0	4
Mohammad Hafeez	Pakistan	4	245	61.25	67.867	105	1	1
Shakib Al Hasan	Bangladesh	4	237	59.25	110.233	68	0	3
Nasir Jamshed	Pakistan	4	193	48.25	96.02	112	1	1
Source:ESPNCricinfo

=== Bowling ===
Player	Team	Matches	Wickets	Runs	Average	SR	BBI	ECon.	4W
Umar Gul	Pakistan	4	9	208	23.111	24	3/58	5.778	0
Saeed Ajmal	Pakistan	4	8	161	20.125	28.25	3/27	4.274	0
Aizaz Cheema	Pakistan	4	8	196	24.5	24.75	4/43	5.939	1
Abdur Razzak	Bangladesh	4	6	154	25.667	40	2/26	3.85	0
Mashrafe Mortaza	Bangladesh	4	6	177	29.5	39.833	2/44	4.444	0
Source:ESPNCricinfo
