= Surinder Khanna =

Indian cricketer (born 1956)

Cricket information
- Batting: Right-handed
- Bowling: Wicketkeeper
Medal record
Men's Cricket
Representing India
ACC Asia Cup
Winner	1984 United Arab Emirates
- Source: CricInfo, 6 March 2006

Surinder Khanna (born 3 June 1956) is a former Indian cricketer. He played domestic cricket for Delhi and played ten One Day Internationals for India between 1979 and 1984. He was a wicket-keeper.

== International career ==
India won the tournament and Khanna was named Man of the Series. He was a member of the Indian team that went to Pakistan in October the same year. He played in the first ODI in which India lost to Pakistan by 46 runs.
