= Praveen Kumar (cricketer) =

Indian cricketer

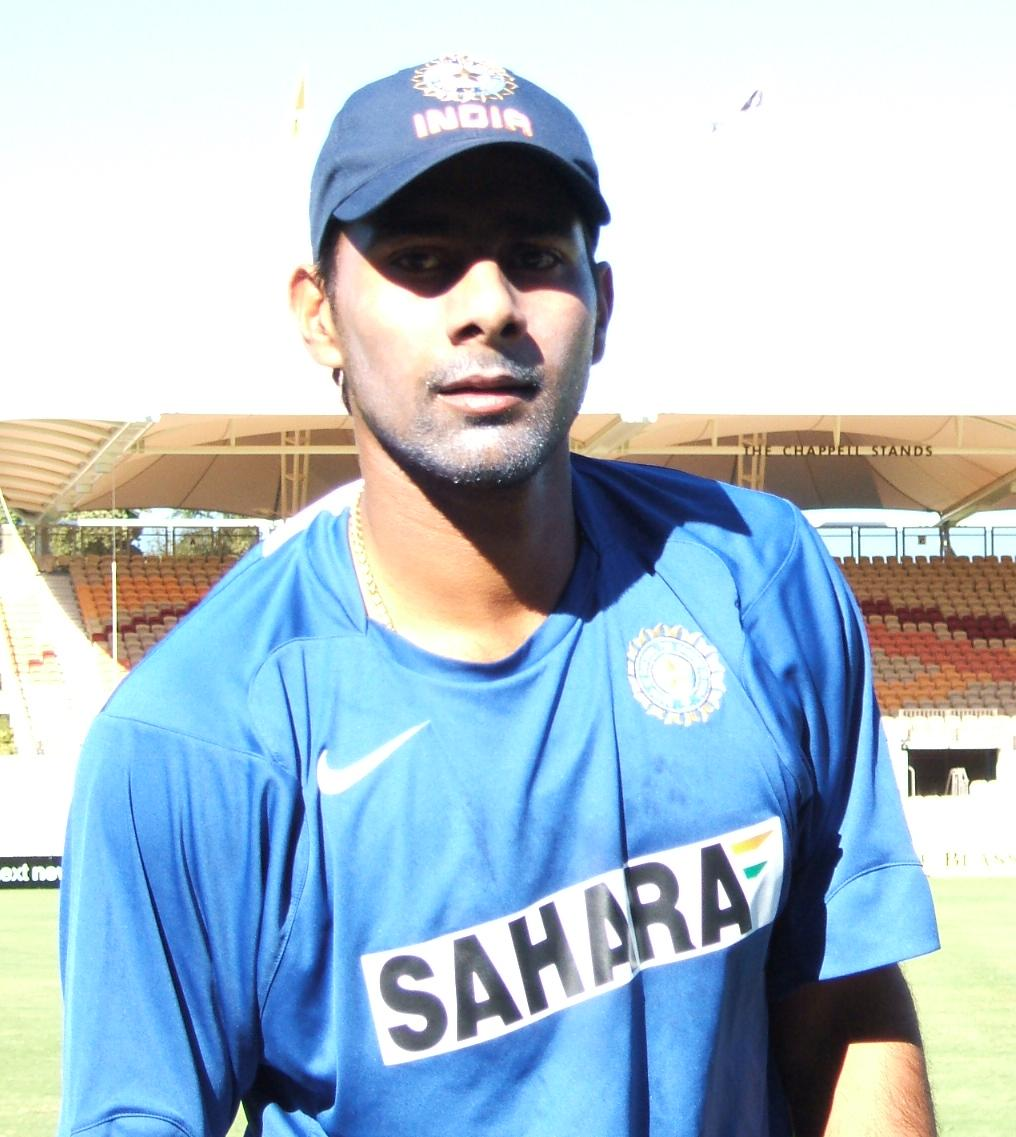

Personal information
- Full name: Praveen Kumar
- Born: 2 October 1986 (age 40); Meerut, Uttar Pradesh, India
- Nickname: PK
- Height: 1.80 m (5 ft 11 in)
- Batting: Right-handed
- Bowling: Right-arm medium-fast
- Role: Bowler

International information
- National side: India (2007–2012)
- Test debut (cap 270): 20 June 2011 v West Indies
- Last Test: 13 August 2011 v England
- ODI debut (cap 170): 18 November 2007 v Pakistan
- Last ODI: 18 March 2012 v Pakistan
- ODI shirt no.: 8
- T20I debut (cap 20): 1 February 2008 v Australia
- Last T20I: 30 March 2012 v South Africa
- T20I shirt no.: 8

Domestic team information
- Years: Team
- 2005–2018: Uttar Pradesh
- 2008–2010: Royal Challengers Bangalore (squad no. 8)
- 2011–2013: Kings XI Punjab (squad no. 8)
- 2014: Mumbai Indians (squad no. 88)
- 2015: Sunrisers Hyderabad (squad no. 19)
- 2016–2017: Gujarat Lions (squad no. 17)

Career statistics
Competition	Test	ODI	T20I	FC
Matches	6	68	10	66
Runs scored	149	292	7	2,110
Batting average	14.90	13.90	2.33	22.44
100s/50s	0/0	0/1	0/0	0/11
Top score	40	54*	6	98
Balls bowled	1,611	3,242	156	14,158
Wickets	27	77	8	267
Bowling average	25.81	36.02	24.12	23.61
5 wickets in innings	1	0	0	17
10 wickets in match	0	0	0	1
Best bowling	5/106	4/31	2/14	8/68
Catches/stumpings	2/–	11/–	1/–	12/–
Medal record
Men's Cricket
Representing India
ACC Asia Cup
Winner	2010 Sri Lanka
Runner-up	2008 Pakistan
- Source: ESPNcricinfo, 20 October 2024

Praveenkumar Sakat Singh (born 2 October 1986) is a former Indian cricketer who bowled right-arm medium-pace. In first-class cricket, he played for Uttar Pradesh cricket team. He relied on his ability to swing the ball both ways along with line and length. In October 2018, he announced his retirement from all forms of cricket. He was a part of the Indian squad which won the 2010 Asia Cup.

== Personal life ==
Praveenkumar Sakat Singh was born in Meerut on 2 October 1983, to police head constable Sakat Singh. He married Sapna Choudhary in 2010, a national-level shooting sport player.

He owns a farmhouse in Barnava village and Praveen Restaurant and Wedding Banquet in Meerut on NH-58 Rohta Road Crossing.

He entered politics by joining Samajwadi Party before the UP assembly.

Kumar has had well-documented struggles with stress-related illnesses, which he has worked hard to rectify. According to ESPNcricinfo, he once beat up a doctor after having mud splashed on clothes by said doctor's car as Kumar stepped out of a shop where he had gone to buy a gun. The beating was administered in a glassware shop, which sustained damage.

Kumar revealed that he had contemplated suicide due to his mental health and loneliness and had chosen to undergo therapy.

== Domestic career ==
He was the joint highest wicket-taker in the 2004–05 Vijay Hazare Trophy, India's domestic 50 over tournament. Praveen Kumar first came to limelight for his performances for India Red in the NKP Salve Challenger Trophy 2007. He also appeared with ONGC in regional tournaments.

== ODI Debut for India ==
He made his One Day International cricket debut for the India national cricket team against Pakistan national cricket team at Sawai Mansingh Stadium, Jaipur in November 2007.

He was later selected for the tri-nation Commonwealth Bank Series in 2008 in Australia against Australia national cricket team and Sri Lanka national cricket team and played an important role in the Indian triumph. He was noted for his swing and his battles against Ricky Ponting.

He established himself as the premier opening bowler for India in the ODIs from 2008 to 2010. He was selected for the ICC Cricket World Cup 2011 but owing to an injury was replaced by Sreesanth.

== Test Debut for India ==
He made his Test debut against West Indies cricket team at Kingston in June 2011. He took a five wicket haul in the first Test match of India tour of England, 2011.

== IPL career ==
Praveen Kumar was initially with the Royal Challengers Bangalore until 2010.

While at RCB he became the 6th bowler in Indian Premier League history to take a hat trick. He did this against the Rajasthan Royals in M. Chinnaswamy Stadium, Bangalore in 2010.

In 2008 while playing for RCB in a match against Rajasthan Royals he hit the joint biggest six in the history of the IPL. The shot which came off the bowling of Yusuf Pathan was measured at 124m in distance equally the record of Chennai Super Kings Albie Morkel in the same season.

In the Indian Premier League he played for Kings XI Punjab from 2011 to 2013. He was unsold in the 2014 IPL auction owing to high base price.

After going unsold in IPL 2014 Auction, Mumbai Indians signed him as their replacement for the injured Zaheer Khan. Zaheer, who played six games, was ruled out for the rest of the IPL 2014 season after straining his left latissimus dorsi muscle.

He was picked up by the Sunrisers Hyderabad in IPL 2015 auctions for a fee of 220 lakh Indian rupees.

He then went on to play for Gujarat Lions from 2016 to 2017. This was the last time he featured in IPL.
