= 1984 Asia Cup =

Cricket tournament in the United Arab Emirates

- 1984 Rothmans Asia Cup logo
- Dates: 6 – 13 April 1984
- Administrator: Asian Cricket Council
- Cricket format: One Day International
- Tournament format: Round-robin
- Host: United Arab Emirates
- Champions: India (1st title)
- Runners-up: Sri Lanka
- Participants: 3
- Matches: 3
- Player of the series: (India) Surinder Khanna
- Most runs: (India) Surinder Khanna (107)
- Most wickets: (India) Ravi Shastri (4)

The 1984 Asia Cup (also known as the Rothmans Asia Cup) was the inaugural edition of the Asia Cup. It was held in Sharjah, UAE, which was the location of the newly formed Asian Cricket Council. The new tournament was held between April 6–13, in 1984 and three teams took part: India, Pakistan, and Sri Lanka. The Sharjah Cricket Association Stadium hosted its first One Day International (ODI) match.

The 1984 Asia Cup was a round-robin tournament where each team played the other once. India won both its matches, winning the inaugural Cup. Sri Lanka came in second while Pakistan lost both its matches.

== Squads ==
Squads
India	Sri Lanka	Pakistan
Sunil Gavaskar (c)	Duleep Mendis (c)	Zaheer Abbas (c)
Surinder Khanna (wk)	Brendon Kuruppu (wk)	Mohsin Khan
Ghulam Parkar	Sidath Wettimuny	Saadat Ali
Dilip Vengsarkar	Roy Dias	Mudassar Nazar
Sandeep Patil	Ranjan Madugalle	Javed Miandad
Ravi Shastri	Arjuna Ranatunga	Saleem Malik
Kirti Azad	Aravinda de Silva	Abdul Qadir
Roger Binny	Uvais Karnain	Shahid Mahboob
Madan Lal	Ravi Ratnayeke	Sarfraz Nawaz
Manoj Prabhakar	Somachandra De Silva	Anil Dalpat (wk)
Chetan Sharma	Vinothen John	Rashid Khan
-	-	Qasim Umar
-	-	Azeem Hafeez

== Matches ==
=== Group stage ===
Pos	Team	Pld	W	L	NR	Pts	NRR	Qualification
1	India	2	2	0	0	8	4.212	Champions
2	Sri Lanka	2	1	1	0	4	3.489	
3	Pakistan	2	0	2	0	0	3.059	

Source: ESPN Cricinfo

6 April 1984
Scorecard

Pakistan; 187/9 (46 overs)	v	Sri Lanka; 190/5 (43.3 overs)
Zaheer Abbas 47 (68); Arjuna Ranatunga 3/38 (10 overs)		Roy Dias 57 (95); Abdul Qadir 2/42 (9 overs)

Sri Lanka won by 5 wickets
Sharjah Cricket Association Stadium, Sharjah, UAE
Umpires: Dickie Bird (Eng) and Swaroop Kishen (Ind)
Player of the match: Roy Dias (SL)

8 April 1984
Scorecard

Sri Lanka; 96 (41 overs)	v	India; 97/0 (21.4 overs)
Ranjan Madugalle 38 (76); Madan Lal 3/11 (8 overs)		Surinder Khanna 51* (69)

India won by 10 wickets
Sharjah Cricket Association Stadium, Sharjah, UAE
Umpires: Dickie Bird (Eng) and Shakoor Rana (Pak)
Player of the match: Surinder Khanna (Ind)

13 April 1984
Scorecard

India; 188/4 (46 overs)	v	Pakistan; 134 (39.4 overs)
Surinder Khanna 56 (72); Shahid Mahboob 1/23 (10 overs)		Mohsin Khan 35 (65); Roger Binny 3/33 (9.4 overs)

India won by 54 runs
Sharjah Cricket Association Stadium, Sharjah, UAE
Umpires: Dickie Bird (Eng) and Herbi Felsinger (SL)
Player of the match: Surinder Khanna (Ind)

== Statistics ==
=== Most runs ===
Player	Matches	Innings	Runs	Average	SR	HS	100	50	4s	6s
(India) Surinder Khanna	2	2	107	107.00	75.88	56	0	2	9	2
(Pakistan) Zaheer Abbas	2	2	74	37.00	65.48	47	0	0	3	2
(Sri Lanka) Roy Dias	2	2	62	62.00	50.81	57*	0	1	1	0
(Pakistan) Mohsin Khan	2	2	62	31.71	31.00	35	0	0	3	0
(India) Ghulam Parkar	2	2	54	54.00	43.90	32*	0	0	5	0
Source: Cricinfo

=== Most wickets ===
Player	Matches	Innings	Wickets	Overs	Econ.	Ave.	BBI	S/R	4WI	5WI
(India) Ravi Shastri	2	2	4	17	3.11	13.25	3/40	25.5	0	0
(India) Madan Lal	2	2	3	14	2.28	10.66	3/11	28.0	0	0
(Sri Lanka) Arjuna Ranatunga	2	1	3	10	3.80	12.66	3/38	20.0	0	0
(India) Chetan Sharma	2	2	3	15	2.66	13.33	3/22	30.0	0	0
(India) Roger Binny	2	2	3	16.4	3.48	19.33	3/33	33.3	0	0
Source: Cricinfo
