= 2014 Asia Cup =

Cricket tournament in Bangladesh

2014 Arise Asia Cup
- Dates: 25 February – 8 March 2014
- Administrator: Asian Cricket Council
- Cricket format: One Day International
- Tournament format: Round-robin
- Host: Bangladesh
- Champions: Sri Lanka (5th title)
- Runners-up: Pakistan
- Participants: 5
- Matches: 11
- Player of the series: (Sri Lanka) Lahiru Thirimanne
- Most runs: (Sri Lanka) Lahiru Thirimanne (279)
- Most wickets: (Sri Lanka) Lasith Malinga (11) (Pakistan) Saeed Ajmal (11)

The 2014 Asia Cup (also known as Arise Asia Cup) was the twelfth edition of the Asia Cup cricket tournament. The tournament was held in Bangladesh from 25 February to 8 March 2014. Pakistan were the defending champions, having won the previous tournament. The tournament included the four Asian Test-playing nations, Bangladesh, India, Pakistan and Sri Lanka; and ICC Asian Associate member Afghanistan. This was the first 50-over tournament in which Afghanistan took part. Ten league matches were played along with the final. The title sponsors of the tournament were Arise India and it was powered by Cycle Agarbathis. Sri Lanka defeated Pakistan in the final to become Asia Cup champions for the fifth time.

== Venues ==
India was originally selected as the host but pulled out in April 2013 citing scheduling concerns. Bangladesh won a bid to become the new host, even shifting their schedule around to accommodate the event. In January 2014, after a wave of political violence in Bangladesh, doubts were cast over Bangladesh's ability to host the event and the 2014 World T20 that followed it. Sri Lanka offered themselves up as an alternative host for both events. Bangladesh provided government assurance for extra security during the events, and so it was decided later in January to retain Bangladesh as hosts. Afghanistan were also added to the tournament, making it a five-team event.

Fatullah	Dhaka
Shaheed Ria Gope Cricket Stadium	Sher-e-Bangla National Cricket Stadium
Coordinates: 23°39′0.58″N 90°29′19.72″E	Coordinates: 23°48′24.9″N 90°21′48.9″E
Capacity: 18,000	Capacity: 26,000

== Squads ==
Afghanistan	Bangladesh	India	Pakistan	Sri Lanka
Mohammad Nabi (c); Fazal Niazai (vc); Dawlat Zadran; Hamid Hassan; Karim Sadiq; Mohammad Shahzad (wk); Nawroz Mangal; Rahmat Shah; Shapoor Zadran; Asghar Afghan; Hamza Hotak; Mirwais Ashraf; Najibullah Zadran; Noor Ali Zadran; Samiullah Shenwari	Mushfiqur Rahim (c & wk); Arafat Sunny (vc); Anamul Haque (wk); Shamsur Rahman; Imrul Kayes; Mominul Haque; Ziaur Rahman; Nasir Hossain; Naeem Islam; Sohag Gazi; Mashrafe Mortaza; Abdur Razzak; Rubel Hossain; Al-Amin Hossain; Shakib Al Hasan	Virat Kohli (c); Rohit Sharma (vc); Shikhar Dhawan; Ajinkya Rahane; Cheteshwar Pujara; Dinesh Karthik (wk); Ambati Rayudu; Stuart Binny; Ravindra Jadeja; Ravichandran Ashwin; Amit Mishra; Bhuvneshwar Kumar; Mohammed Shami; Varun Aaron; Ishwar Pandey	Misbah-ul-Haq (c); Mohammad Hafeez (vc); Kamran Akmal (wk); Sharjeel Khan; Ahmed Shehzad; Sohaib Maqsood; Umar Akmal (wk); Fawad Alam; Shahid Afridi; Bilawal Bhatti; Saeed Ajmal; Abdur Rehman; Junaid Khan; Umar Gul; Anwar Ali; Mohammad Talha	Angelo Mathews (c); Dinesh Chandimal (vc & wk); Kusal Perera (wk); Lahiru Thirimanne; Kumar Sangakkara (wk); Mahela Jayawardene; Ashan Priyanjan; Thisara Perera; Chathuranga de Silva; Sachithra Senanayake; Ajantha Mendis; Lasith Malinga; Dhammika Prasad; Nuwan Kulasekara; Suranga Lakmal

Notes

1. The squad for India had MS Dhoni as captain but he was ruled out due to injury and was replaced with Virat Kohli as captain and Dinesh Karthik as wicket-keeper.
2. Shakib Al Hasan suffered a match ban, hence he stayed out of the first two matches against India and Afghanistan.
3. Tamim Iqbal was ruled out due to injury from the Bangladesh squad.
4. Mashrafe Mortaza was ruled out of the Bangladesh squad due to injury after the first match against India.
5. Sohag Gazi was ruled out of the Bangladesh squad due to injury after the second match against Afghanistan.

== Schedule ==
=== Points table ===
Pos	Team	Pld	W	L	T	NR	BP	Pts	NRR
1	Sri Lanka	4	4	0	0	0	1	9	0.773
2	Pakistan	4	3	1	0	0	1	7	0.349
3	India	4	2	2	0	0	1	5	0.450
4	Afghanistan	4	1	3	0	0	0	2	−1.278
5	Bangladesh	4	0	4	0	0	0	0	−0.259

Source: Cricinfo

Qualified for final

=== Fixtures and results ===
25 February 2014
14:00 (D/N)
Scorecard

Sri Lanka; 296/6 (50 overs)	v	Pakistan; 284 (48.5 overs)
Lahiru Thirimanne 102 (110); Umar Gul 2/38 (8 overs)		Umar Akmal 74 (72); Lasith Malinga 5/52 (9.5 overs)

Sri Lanka won by 12 runs
Shaheed Ria Gope Cricket Stadium , Fatullah
Umpires: Johan Cloete (SA) and Bruce Oxenford (Aus)
Player of the match: Lasith Malinga (SL)

- Pakistan won the toss and elected to field

26 February 2014
14:00 (D/N)
Scorecard

Bangladesh; 279/7 (50 overs)	v	India; 280/4 (49 overs)
Mushfiqur Rahim 117 (113); Mohammed Shami 4/50 (10 overs)		Virat Kohli 136 (122); Ziaur Rahman 1/20 (5 overs)

India won by 6 wickets
Shaheed Ria Gope Cricket Stadium, Fatullah
Umpires: Billy Bowden (NZ) and Nigel Llong (Eng)
Player of the match: Virat Kohli (Ind)

- India won the toss and elected to field

27 February 2014
14:00 (D/N)
Scorecard

Pakistan; 248/8 (50 overs)	v	Afghanistan; 176 (47.2 overs)
Umar Akmal 102* (89); Mirwais Ashraf 2/29 (8 overs)		Noor Ali Zadran 44 (63); Mohammad Hafeez 3/29 (9.2 overs)

Pakistan won by 72 runs
Shaheed Ria Gope Cricket Stadium, Fatullah
Umpires: Billy Bowden (NZ) and Johan Cloete (SA)
Player of the match: Umar Akmal (Pak)

- Afghanistan won the toss and elected to field

28 February 2014
14:00 (D/N)
Scorecard

India; 264/9 (50 overs)	v	Sri Lanka; 265/8 (49.2 overs)
Shikhar Dhawan 94 (114); Ajantha Mendis 4/60 (10 overs)		Kumar Sangakkara 103 (84); Ravindra Jadeja 3/30 (10 overs)

Sri Lanka won by 2 wickets
Shaheed Ria Gope Cricket Stadium, Fatullah
Umpires: Nigel Llong (Eng) and Bruce Oxenford (Aus)
Player of the match: Kumar Sangakkara (SL)

- Sri Lanka won the toss and elected to field

1 March 2014
14:00 (D/N)
Scorecard

Afghanistan; 254/6 (50 overs)	v	Bangladesh; 222 (47.5 overs)
Asghar Stanikzai 90* (103); Arafat Sunny 2/44 (10 overs)		Mominul Haque 50 (72); Mohammad Nabi 3/44 (9.4 overs)

Afghanistan won by 32 runs
Shaheed Ria Gope Cricket Stadium , Fatullah
Umpires: Billy Bowden (NZ) and Johan Cloete (SA)
Player of the match: Samiullah Shenwari (Afg)

- Bangladesh won the toss and elected to field

2 March 2014
14:00 (D/N)
Scorecard

India; 245/8 (50 overs)	v	Pakistan; 249/9 (49.4 overs)
Ambati Rayudu 58 (62); Saeed Ajmal 3/40 (10 overs)		Mohammad Hafeez 75 (117); Ravichandran Ashwin 3/44 (9.4 overs)

Pakistan won by 1 wicket
Sher-e-Bangla National Stadium, Mirpur
Umpires: Nigel Llong (Eng) and Bruce Oxenford (Aus)
Player of the match: Mohammad Hafeez (Pak)

- Pakistan won the toss and elected to field

3 March 2014
14:00 (D/N)
Scorecard

Sri Lanka; 253/6 (50 overs)	v	Afghanistan; 124 (38.4 overs)
Kumar Sangakkara 76 (102); Mirwais Ashraf 2/29 (8 overs)		Mohammad Nabi 37 (43); Ajantha Mendis 3/11 (7 overs)

Sri Lanka won by 129 runs
Sher-e-Bangla National Stadium, Mirpur
Umpires: Johan Cloete (SA) and Bruce Oxenford (Aus)
Player of the match: Kumar Sangakkara (SL)

- Afghanistan won the toss and elected to field
- As a result of this match, Sri Lanka qualified for the final.

4 March 2014
14:00 (D/N)
Scorecard

Bangladesh; 326/3 (50 overs)	v	Pakistan; 329/7 (49.5 overs)
Anamul Haque 100 (132); Saeed Ajmal 2/61 (10 overs)		Ahmed Shehzad 103 (123); Mominul Haque 2/37 (9 overs)

Pakistan won by 3 wickets
Sher-e-Bangla National Stadium, Mirpur
Umpires: Johan Cloete (SA) and Nigel Llong (Eng)
Player of the match: Shahid Afridi (Pak)

- Pakistan won the toss and elected to field
- This is the highest score for Bangladesh in ODI
- This is the highest run chased by Pakistan in ODI
- As a result of this match, Pakistan qualified for the final.
- As a result of this match, Afghanistan, Bangladesh, and India Fall to qualify for the final.

5 March 2014
14:00 (D/N)
Scorecard

Afghanistan; 159 (45.2 overs)	v	India; 160/2 (32.2 overs)
Samiullah Shenwari 50 (73); Ravindra Jadeja 4/30 (10 overs)		Shikhar Dhawan 60 (78); Mirwais Ashraf 1/26 (5 overs)

India won by 8 wickets
Sher-e-Bangla National Stadium, Mirpur
Umpires: Billy Bowden (NZ) and Nigel Llong (Eng)
Player of the match: Ravindra Jadeja (Ind)

- India won the toss and elected to field

6 March 2014
14:00 (D/N)
Scorecard

Bangladesh; 204/9 (50 overs)	v	Sri Lanka; 208/7 (49 overs)
Anamul Haque 49 (86); Ashan Priyanjan 2/11 (3 overs)		Angelo Mathews 74* (103); Al-Amin Hossain 2/42 (10 overs)

Sri Lanka won by 3 wickets
Sher-e-Bangla National Stadium, Mirpur
Umpires: Billy Bowden (NZ) and Bruce Oxenford (Aus)
Player of the match: Angelo Mathews (SL)

- Sri Lanka won the toss and elected to field

=== Final ===
8 March 2014
14:00 (D/N)
Scorecard

Pakistan; 260/5 (50 overs)	v	Sri Lanka; 261/5 (46.2 overs)
Fawad Alam 114* (134); Lasith Malinga 5/56 (10 overs)		Lahiru Thirimanne 101 (108); Saeed Ajmal 3/26 (10 overs)

Sri Lanka won by 5 wickets
Sher-e-Bangla National Stadium, Mirpur
Umpires: Nigel Llong (Eng) and Bruce Oxenford (Aus)
Player of the match: Lasith Malinga (SL)

- Sri Lanka won the toss and elected to field

== Records and statistics ==
=== Batting ===
Source: Cricinfo

Player	Nat	Matches	Runs	NO	Ave.	SR	HS	100	50	4s	6s
Lahiru Thirimanne	(Sri Lanka)	5	279	0	55.80	79.94	102	2	2	31	2
Umar Akmal	(Pakistan)	5	253	0	84.33	110.48	102*	1	2	23	6
Kumar Sangakkara	(Sri Lanka)	5	248	0	49.60	96.49	103	1	2	26	2
Ahmed Shehzad	(Pakistan)	5	228	0	45.60	80.00	103	1	1	30	1
Anamul Haque	(Bangladesh)	4	227	0	56.75	68.16	100	1	1	13	8

=== Bowling ===
Source: Cricinfo

Player	Nat	Matches	Wickets	Overs	Runs	Econ.	Ave.	BBI	4WI	5WI
Lasith Malinga	(Sri Lanka)	4	11	34.5	189	5.42	17.18	5/52	2	2
Saeed Ajmal	(Pakistan)	5	11	49.0	202	4.12	18.36	3/26	0	0
Ajantha Mendis	(Sri Lanka)	3	9	26.0	126	4.84	14.00	4/60	1	0
Ravichandran Ashwin	(India)	4	9	39.4	167	4.21	18.55	3/31	0	0
Mohammed Shami	(India)	4	9	37.2	230	6.16	25.55	4/50	1	0

=== Achievements ===
Match 1

- Lasith Malinga took his 6th five wicket haul in ODIs. It was his first five wicket haul in ODIs since January 2012.
- Lahiru Thirimanne made his 2nd ODI ton.

Match 2

- Mohammed Shami took his career best figures of 10–1–50–4.
- Mushfiqur Rahim made his career best score of 117.
- Only the second time that both captains (Virat Kohli and Mushfiqur Rahim) scored 100 runs.

Match 3

- First ever match between Afghanistan and Pakistan.
- Umar Akmal made his 2nd ODI ton.
- Afghanistan became the seventh team to play a match in the Asia Cup.

Match 4

- Ravichandran Ashwin reached 100 ODI wickets for India.
- Kumar Sangakkara became the third batsman to score 4000+ runs against India.
- Kumar Sangakkara made his 18th ODI ton.
- Bhuvneshwar Kumar became the second player to be stumped on a wide, without facing a single legal ball (Diamond duck) in cricket history.

Match 5

- First ever match between Afghanistan and Bangladesh.
- Afghanistan registered their first win against a Test-playing nation.
- Asghar Stanikzai made his career best score of 90 not out.

Match 6

- This match was Ravindra Jadeja's 100th ODI.
- This match was Mohammad Talha's debut ODI.
- Mohammad Hafeez made his 19th ODI fifty.

Match 7

- First ever match between Afghanistan and Sri Lanka.
- Kumar Sangakkara became the second player to score 1000+ runs in Asia Cup history after Sanath Jayasuriya.
- Kumar Sangakkara made his 85th ODI fifty. It was his 12th 50+ score in Asia Cup tournaments.

Match 8

- Imrul Kayes and Anamul Haque added 150 for the first wicket which became Bangladesh's second best opening stand in ODIs.
- Ahmed Shehzad made his 5th ODI ton.
- Shahid Afridi's fifty off 18 balls became the fastest fifty in a chase and the second fastest in ODIs.
- 327 became Pakistan's highest successful run chase in ODIs, beating their previous highest chase of 322 runs against India in Mohali in 2007.

Match 9

- First ever match between Afghanistan and India.
- Mohammed Shami became the second fastest Indian bowler to take 50 ODI wickets.

Match 10

- As a result of this match, Sri Lanka won 4 out of 4 league matches and Bangladesh lost 4 out 4 league matches.

Final

- Fawad Alam made his maiden ODI ton.
- Lasith Malinga took his 2nd five wicket haul of the tournament, becoming the first bowler to take 3 five wicket hauls in Asia Cup history. It was his 7th five wicket haul in ODIs.
- Lahiru Thirimanne made his 3rd ODI ton and became the top scorer of the tournament with 279 runs in 5 matches. He was thus awarded Man of the Series.
- Mahela Jayawardene made his 71st ODI fifty.
- Sri Lanka won the tournament undefeated after losing all their matches in the previous tournament.
- Sri Lanka tied with India for the record of most Asia Cup titles (5).
