= 2010 Asia Cup =

Cricket tournament in Sri Lanka

2010 Micromax Asia Cup
- Dates: 15 – 24 June 2010
- Administrator: Asian Cricket Council
- Cricket format: One Day International
- Tournament format(s): Round-robin, knockout
- Host: Sri Lanka
- Champions: India (5th title)
- Runners-up: Sri Lanka
- Participants: 4
- Matches: 7
- Player of the series: (Pakistan) Shahid Afridi
- Most runs: (Pakistan) Shahid Afridi (265)
- Most wickets: (Sri Lanka) Lasith Malinga (9)

The 2010 Asia Cup (also known as Micromax Asia Cup) was the tenth edition of the Asia Cup cricket tournament, which was held in Sri Lanka from 15 to 24 June 2010. Only the test playing nations India, Pakistan, Sri Lanka and Bangladesh were taking part in the competition. India defeated Sri Lanka by 81 runs in the final to win a record 5th Asia Cup title. Pakistani captain, Shahid Afridi was declared the man of the tournament for scoring the most runs in the tournament, 265, with an average of 88.33 and a strike rate of 164.59.

== Trophy ==
The trophy was made of a combination of silver, gold, copper and brass with a silver finish with mat and gloss finish. It stands to communicate the strength, purity, humility and persistence that not only represents the four metals but also the four participating nations.

== Venue ==
Rangiri Dambulla International Stadium was the only venue of Asia Cup 2010 as other stadiums in Sri Lanka, including the R. Premadasa Stadium, were undergoing renovation for the 2011 Cricket World Cup. All seven matches were Day/Night affairs.

Rangiri Dambulla International Stadium is a 16,800 seat cricket stadium in Sri Lanka. The Stadium is situated in the Central Province, close to Dambulla on a 60-acre (240,000 m^{2}) site leased from the Rangiri Dambulla Temple. The stadium is built overlooking the Dambulla Tank (reservoir) and the Dambulla Rock.

Rangiri Dambulla International Stadium in Dambulla.

== Squads ==
The squads of the four teams participating in the tournament were announced in early June by the respective cricket boards.

Bangladesh	India	Pakistan	Sri Lanka
Shakib Al Hasan (c); Mushfiqur Rahim (vc & wk); Tamim Iqbal; Abdur Razzak; Imrul Kayes; Jahurul Islam; Junaid Siddique; Mahmudullah; Mashrafe Mortaza; Mohammad Ashraful; Naeem Islam; Rubel Hossain; Shafiul Islam; Suhrawadi Shuvo; Syed Rasel	MS Dhoni (c & wk); Virender Sehwag (vc); Gautam Gambhir; Virat Kohli; Suresh Raina; Rohit Sharma; Dinesh Karthik (wk); Ravindra Jadeja; Harbhajan Singh; Praveen Kumar; Zaheer Khan; Ashish Nehra; Pragyan Ojha; Ashok Dinda; Ravichandran Ashwin; Saurabh Tiwary	Shahid Afridi (c); Salman Butt (vc); Abdul Razzaq; Abdur Rehman; Asad Shafiq; Imran Farhat; Kamran Akmal (wk); Mohammad Asif; Mohammad Amir; Saeed Ajmal; Shoaib Akhtar; Shahzaib Hasan; Shoaib Malik; Umar Akmal; Umar Amin	Kumar Sangakkara (c & wk); Muttiah Muralitharan (vc); Tillakaratne Dilshan; Rangana Herath; Mahela Jayawardene; Suraj Randiv; Thilina Kandamby; Chamara Kapugedera; Nuwan Kulasekara; Farveez Maharoof; Lasith Malinga; Angelo Mathews; Thilan Samaraweera; Upul Tharanga; Chanaka Welegedara

== Fixtures ==
=== Group stage ===
Each side played each other once in the group stages. The top 2 teams based on points at the end of the group stages meet each other in a one-off final. Each win yielded 4 points while a tie/no result yielded 1-point. A bonus point system was also in place, where a team could earn an extra point, in addition to the four received from a win, for a total of 5 points if they achieved victory using 80% or less of available overs or kept the opposition score to less than 80% of their own.

==== Table ====
Pos	Team	Pld	W	L	T	NR	BP	Pts	NRR
1	Sri Lanka	3	3	0	0	0	2	14	1.424
2	India	3	2	1	0	0	1	9	0.275
3	Pakistan	3	1	2	0	0	1	5	0.788
4	Bangladesh	3	0	3	0	0	0	0	−2.627

Source: ESPNCricinfo

==== Matches ====
All times local (UTC+05:30)

15 June 2010
14:30 (D/N)
Scorecard

Sri Lanka; 242/9 (50 overs)	v	Pakistan; 226 (47 overs)
Angelo Mathews 55* (61); Shoaib Akhtar 3/41 (10 overs)		Shahid Afridi 109 (76); Lasith Malinga 5/34 (10 overs)

Sri Lanka won by 16 runs
Rangiri Dambulla International Stadium, Dambulla
Umpires: Billy Bowden (NZ) and Billy Doctrove (WI)
Player of the match: Shahid Afridi (Pak)

- Sri Lanka won the toss and elected to bat.

16 June 2010
14:30 (D/N)
Scorecard

Bangladesh; 167 (34.5 overs)	v	India; 168/4 (30.4 overs)
Imrul Kayes 37 (35); Virender Sehwag 4/6 (2.5 overs)		Gautam Gambhir 82 (101); Mashrafe Mortaza 2/37 (5.4 overs)

India won by 6 wickets
Rangiri Dambulla International Stadium, Dambulla
Umpires: Billy Doctrove (WI) and Bruce Oxenford (Aus)
Player of the match: Gautam Gambhir (Ind)

- Bangladesh won the toss and elected to bat.

18 June 2010
14:30 (D/N)
Scorecard

Sri Lanka; 312/4 (50 overs)	v	Bangladesh; 186 (40.2 overs)
Tillakaratne Dilshan 71 (51); Shafiul Islam 2/59 (10 overs)		Tamim Iqbal 51 (53); Tillakaratne Dilshan 3/37 (10 overs)

Sri Lanka won by 126 runs
Rangiri Dambulla International Stadium, Dambulla
Umpires: Billy Bowden (NZ) and Bruce Oxenford (Aus)
Player of the match: Tillakaratne Dilshan (Sri)

- Sri Lanka won the toss and elected to bat.

19 June 2010
14:30 (D/N)
Scorecard

Pakistan; 267 (49.3 overs)	v	India; 271/7 (49.5 overs)
Salman Butt 74 (85); Praveen Kumar 3/53 (10 overs)		Gautam Gambhir 83 (97); Saeed Ajmal 3/56 (10 overs)

India won by 3 wickets
Rangiri Dambulla International Stadium, Dambulla
Umpires: Billy Bowden (NZ) and Billy Doctrove (WI)
Player of the match: Gautam Gambhir (Ind)

- Pakistan won the toss and elected to bat.

21 June 2010
14:30 (D/N)
Scorecard

Pakistan; 385/7 (50 overs)	v	Bangladesh; 246/5 (50 overs)
Shahid Afridi 124 (60); Shafiul Islam 3/95 (10 overs)		Junaid Siddique 97 (114); Imran Farhat 1/21 (5 overs)

Pakistan won by 139 runs
Rangiri Dambulla International Stadium, Dambulla
Umpires: Billy Doctrove (WI) and Bruce Oxenford (Aus)
Player of the match: Shahid Afridi (Pak)

- Pakistan won the toss and elected to bat.
- ODI debuts: Jahurul Islam (Ban) and Asad Shafiq (Pak)

22 June 2010
14:30 (D/N)
Scorecard

India; 209 (42.3 overs)	v	Sri Lanka; 211/3 (37.3 overs)
Rohit Sharma 69 (73); Farveez Maharoof 5/42 (10 overs)		Kumar Sangakkara 73 (82); Zaheer Khan 2/42 (7 overs)

Sri Lanka won by 7 wickets
Rangiri Dambulla International Stadium, Dambulla
Umpires: Billy Bowden (NZ) and Bruce Oxenford (Aus)
Player of the match: Farveez Maharoof (SL)

- Sri Lanka won the toss and elected to field.
- Farveez Maharoof got his first hat-trick in this match.

=== Final ===
24 June 2010
14:30 (D/N)
Scorecard

India; 268/6 (50 overs)	v	Sri Lanka; 187 (44.4 overs)
Dinesh Karthik 66 (84); Thilina Kandamby 2/37 (7 overs)		Chamara Kapugedera 55* (88); Ashish Nehra 4/40 (9 overs)

India won by 81 runs
Rangiri Dambulla International Stadium, Dambulla
Umpires: Billy Bowden (NZ) and Billy Doctrove (WI)
Player of the match: Dinesh Karthik (Ind)

- India won the toss and elected to bat.
- India won the Asia Cup title for the fifth time.

Dinesh Karthik was declared the Man of the Match for his match winning innings of 66 off 84 balls while Pakistan's Shahid Afridi was declared Man of the Series for scoring 265 runs in 3 matches during the tournament.

== Statistics ==
=== Batting ===
Player	Innings	Runs	Average	SR	HS
(Pakistan) Shahid Afridi	3	265	88.33	164.59	124
(India) Gautam Gambhir	4	203	50.75	82.85	83
(Sri Lanka) Kumar Sangakkara	4	184	46.00	73.01	73
(India) MS Dhoni	4	173	57.66	78.99	56
(Sri Lanka) Mahela Jayawardene	4	161	53.66	87.02	54

=== Bowling ===
Player	Innings	Wickets	Overs	BBI	Econ.
(Sri Lanka) Lasith Malinga	3	9	28.2	5/34	4.44
(India) Ashish Nehra	3	6	22.0	4/40	5.72
(India) Zaheer Khan	4	6	29.3	2/36	5.01
(India) Praveen Kumar	4	6	34.0	3/53	4.41
(Sri Lanka) Farveez Maharoof	3	5	24.0	5/42	5.66
