= 2000 Asia Cup =

Cricket tournament in Bangladesh

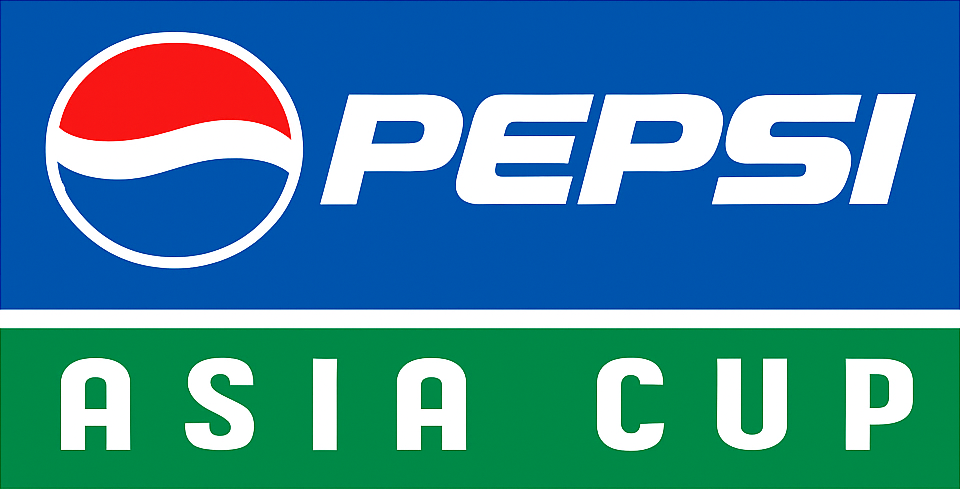
- Dates: 29 May – 7 June 2000
- Administrator: Asian Cricket Council
- Cricket format: One Day International
- Tournament format(s): Round-robin and Knockout
- Host: Bangladesh
- Champions: Pakistan (1st title)
- Runners-up: Sri Lanka
- Participants: 4
- Matches: 7
- Player of the series: (Pakistan) Yousuf Youhana
- Most runs: (Pakistan) Yousuf Youhana (295)
- Most wickets: (Pakistan) Abdul Razzaq (8)

2000 Asia Cup (as called Pepsi Asia Cup) was the seventh edition of the Asia Cup for cricket, which was held in Bangladesh between 29 May – 7 June 2000. India, Pakistan, Sri Lanka, and Bangladesh took part in the tournament. Pakistan won their first ever Asia cup beating Sri Lanka by 39 runs in the final. All the games were played at Dhaka's Bangabandhu National Stadium. Yousuf Youhana was declared the Man of the Series.

== Tournament structure ==
Each side played each other once in the group stages. The top 2 teams based on points at the end of the group stages met each other in a one-off final. Each win yielded 2 points while a tie/no result yielded 1 point. The tournament was the first edition of Asia Cup to feature coloured player clothing and to be played with a white ball.

== Venue ==
7 matches were played at Bangabandhu National Stadium, Dhaka.

| City | Venue | Capacity | Matches |
|---|---|---|---|
| Dhaka, Dhaka Division | Bangabandhu National Stadium | 36,000 | 7 |
2000 Asia Cup is located in Bangladesh

== Squads ==
| Bangladesh | India | Pakistan | Sri Lanka |
|---|---|---|---|
| Aminul Islam (c) | Sourav Ganguly (c) | Moin Khan (c) & (wk) | Sanath Jayasuriya (c) |
| Javed Omar | Rahul Dravid | Inzamam-ul-Haq | Marvan Atapattu |
| Shahriar Hossain | Sachin Tendulkar | Yousuf Youhana | Mahela Jayawardene |
| Mohammad Rafique | Mohammad Azharuddin | Saeed Anwar | Aravinda De Silva |
| Akram Khan | Ajay Jadeja | Imran Nazir | Russel Arnold |
| Habibul Bashar | Hemang Badani | Shahid Afridi | Tillakaratne Dilshan |
| Mohammad Manjural Islam | Robin Singh | Abdul Razzaq | Indika De Saram |
| Khaled Mahmud | Ajit Agarkar | Shoaib Malik | Romesh Kaluwitharana (wk) |
| Khaled Mashud (wk) | Anil Kumble | Wasim Akram | Upul Chandana |
| Naimur Rahman | Thiru Kumaran | Mohammad Wasim | Chaminda Vaas |
| Enamul Haque | Amit Bhandari | Mohammad Akram | Nuwan Zoysa |
| Hasibul Hossain | Nayan Mongia (wk) | Azhar Mahmood | Muttiah Muralitharan |
| Shafiuddin Ahmed | Nikhil Chopra | Shabbir Ahmed | Sajeewa de Silva |
| Mushfiqur Rahman | Sunil Joshi | Arshad Khan | Kaushalya Weeraratne |

== Group stage table ==
| Pos | Team | Pld | W | L | NR | Pts | NRR | Qualification |
|---|---|---|---|---|---|---|---|---|
| 1 | Pakistan | 3 | 3 | 0 | 0 | 6 | 1.920 | Advanced to the Final |
| 2 | Sri Lanka | 3 | 2 | 1 | 0 | 4 | 1.077 | Advanced to the Final |
| 3 | India | 3 | 1 | 2 | 0 | 2 | −0.416 | Eliminated |
| 4 | Bangladesh (H) | 3 | 0 | 3 | 0 | 0 | −2.800 | Eliminated |

Source: ESPN Cricinfo
(H) Host

== Match summary ==
29 May 2000
(Scorecard)

| Bangladesh; 175/6 (50 overs) | v | Sri Lanka; 178/1 (30.4 overs) |
| Javed Omar 85* (146); Chaminda Vaas 2/28 (10 overs) | | Aravinda de Silva 96 (93); Mohammad Rafique 1/42 (10 overs) |

Sri Lanka won by 9 wickets
Bangabandhu National Stadium, Dhaka
Umpires: S Venkataraghavan (Ind) and Saleem Badar (Pak)
Player of the match: Aravinda de Silva (SL)

- Sri Lanka won the toss and elected to field.
- Kaushalya Weeraratne (SL) made his ODI debut.

30 May 2000
(Scorecard)

| Bangladesh; 249/6 (50 overs) | v | India; 252/2 (40.1 overs) |
| Akram Khan 64 (52); Thiru Kumaran 3/54 (9 overs) | | Saurav Ganguly 135* (124); Enamul Haque 1/28 (5 overs) |

India won by 8 wickets
Bangabandhu National Stadium, Dhaka
Umpires: B. C. Cooray (SL) and Mohammad Nazir (Pak)
Player of the match: Saurav Ganguly (Ind)

- Bangladesh won the toss and elected to bat.
- Mushfiqur Rahman (Ban) and Hemang Badani (Ind) both made their ODI debuts.

1 June 2000
(scorecard)

| Sri Lanka; 276/8 (50 overs) | v | India; 205 (45 overs) |
| Sanath Jayasuriya 105 (116); Sachin Tendulkar 2/44 (8 overs) | | Sachin Tendulkar 93 (95); Kaushalya Weeraratne 3/46 (9 overs) |

Sri Lanka won by 71 runs
Bangabandhu National Stadium, Dhaka
Umpires: Saleem Badar (Pak) and Mohammad Nazir (Pak)
Player of the match: Sanath Jayasuriya (SL)

- Sri Lanka won the toss and elected to bat.

2 June 2000
(scorecard)

| Pakistan; 320/3 (50 overs) | v | Bangladesh; 87 (34.2 overs) |
| Imran Nazir 80 (76); Naimur Rahman 1/41 (10 overs) | | Habibul Bashar 23 (44); Abdul Razzaq 3/5 (4 overs) |

Pakistan won by 233 runs
Bangabandhu National Stadium, Dhaka
Umpires: S Venkataraghavan (Ind) and Arani Jayaprakash (Ind)
Player of the match: Imran Nazir (Pak)

- Pakistan won the toss and elected to bat.
- Bangladesh's 87 was the lowest total in Asia Cup tournaments by any team until Sri Lanka's 50 in 2023.

3 June 2000
Scorecard

| Pakistan; 295/7 (50 overs) | v | India; 251 (47.4 overs) |
| Yousuf Youhana 100 (112); Anil Kumble 3/43 (10 overs) | | Ajay Jadeja 93 (103); Abdul Razzaq 4/29 (8 overs) |

Pakistan won by 44 runs
Bangabandhu National Stadium, Dhaka
Umpires: B. C. Cooray (SL) and Asoka de Silva (SL)
Player of the match: Yousuf Youhana (Pak)

- Pakistan won the toss and elected to bat
- Amit Bhandari (Ind) made his ODI debut.
- Mohammad Azharuddin and Ajay Jadeja (Ind) both played their last international match.

5 June 2000
Scorecard

| Sri Lanka; 192 (49 overs) | v | Pakistan; 193/3 (48.2 overs) |
| Marvan Atapattu 62 (102); Azhar Mahmood 3/24 (8 overs) | | Yousuf Youhana 90 (130); Sajeewa de Silva 2/34 (6 overs) |

Pakistan won by 7 wickets
Bangabandhu National Stadium, Dhaka
Umpires: Srinivas Venkataraghavan (Ind) and Arani Jayaprakash (Ind)
Player of the match: Yousuf Youhana (Pak)

- Sri Lanka won the toss and elected to bat.

== Final ==
7 June 2000
Scorecard

| Pakistan; 277/4 (50 overs) | v | Sri Lanka; 238 (45.2 overs) |
| Saeed Anwar 82 (115); Nuwan Zoysa 2/44 (8 overs) | | Marvan Atapattu 100 (124); Arshad Khan 2/42 (10 overs) |

Pakistan won by 39 runs
Bangabandhu National Stadium, Dhaka
Umpires: Shyam Bansal (Ind) and Arani Jayaprakash (Ind)
Player of the match: Moin Khan (Pak)

== Statistics ==
=== Most runs ===
| Player | Matches | Innings | Runs | Average | SR | HS | 100 | 50 | 4s | 6s |
|---|---|---|---|---|---|---|---|---|---|---|
| (Pakistan) Yousuf Youhana | 4 | 4 | 295 | 147.50 | 73.75 | 100* | 1 | 2 | 23 | 4 |
| (Sri Lanka) Marvan Atapattu | 4 | 4 | 245 | 81.66 | 72.27 | 100 | 1 | 1 | 18 | 1 |
| (Sri Lanka) Sanath Jayasuriya | 4 | 4 | 183 | 45.75 | 87.55 | 105 | 1 | 0 | 23 | 0 |
| (Pakistan) Inzamam-ul-Haq | 4 | 4 | 175 | 87.50 | 109.37 | 75* | 0 | 2 | 16 | 3 |
| (India) Sourav Ganguly | 3 | 3 | 156 | 78.00 | 92.85 | 135* | 1 | 0 | 9 | 7 |
Source: Cricinfo

=== Most wickets ===
| Player | Matches | Innings | Wickets | Overs | Econ. | Ave. | BBI | S/R | 4WI | 5WI |
|---|---|---|---|---|---|---|---|---|---|---|
| (Pakistan) Abdul Razzaq | 3 | 3 | 8 | 19.2 | 3.82 | 9.25 | 4/29 | 14.5 | 1 | 0 |
| (Pakistan) Azhar Mahmood | 4 | 4 | 5 | 30 | 3.53 | 21.20 | 3/24 | 36.0 | 0 | 0 |
| (India) Ajit Agarkar | 3 | 3 | 5 | 30 | 4.63 | 27.80 | 2/47 | 36.0 | 0 | 0 |
| (Pakistan) Arshad Khan | 4 | 4 | 5 | 38 | 3.68 | 28.00 | 2/42 | 45.6 | 0 | 0 |
| (Pakistan) Wasim Akram | 3 | 3 | 4 | 20 | 4.05 | 20.25 | 2/38 | 30.0 | 0 | 0 |
Source: Cricinfo
