= Asia Cup =

Men's cricket tournament

Men's Asia Cup
- Administrator: Asian Cricket Council
- Format: ODI and T20I
- First edition: 1984
- Latest edition: 2025
- Next edition: 2027
- Tournament format: Group stage and knockouts
- Number of teams: 6 (2027)
- Current champion: India (9th title)
- Most successful: India (9 titles)
- Most runs: (Sri Lanka) Sanath Jayasuriya (1220)
- Most wickets: (India) Kuldeep Yadav (36)
- Website: asiancricket.org
- 2027 Asia Cup

The Men's Asia Cup is a biennial cricket tournament organized by the Asian Cricket Council (ACC). It features senior men's national teams from Asian member countries and determines the continental cricket champion of Asia. The tournament was established in the year 1983, coinciding with the formation of the Asian Cricket Council, as an effort to promote goodwill among Asian countries through cricket. India boycotted the 1986 edition due to strained cricketing relations with Sri Lanka, while Pakistan withdrew from the 1990–91 edition because of political tensions with India. The 1993 tournament was also cancelled for similar reasons. The ACC later announced that the event would be held biennially starting from 2009. The ICC recognizes all Asia Cup matches as official ODI games. After downsizing the Asian Cricket Council in 2015, it was announced by the ICC that Asia Cup events from 2016 would be played on a rotation basis between One Day International and Twenty20 International format, on the basis of the format of upcoming world events. As a result, the 2016 event was the first event played in the T20I format and functioned as a preparatory tournament ahead of the 2016 ICC World Twenty20.

India, with nine titles (seven ODI and two T20I), is the most successful team in the tournament. Sri Lanka is the second most successful team with six titles (five ODI and one T20I), while Pakistan have won two. Sri Lanka has participated in the most Asia Cups (17), followed by India, Pakistan, and Bangladesh (16 each).

== Format ==
Year	No. Of Teams	Primary Stage	Secondary Stage	Final Stage
1984	3	League stage of 3 teams: 3 matches	None	Topper of the league stage
1986	3	League stage of 3 teams: 3 matches	None	Final of the top 2 teams: 1 match
1988	4	League stage of 4 teams: 6 matches	None	Final of the top 2 teams: 1 match
1990-91	3	League stage of 3 teams: 3 matches	None	Final of the top 2 teams: 1 match
1995	4	League stage of 4 teams: 6 matches	None	Final of the top 2 teams: 1 match
1997	4	League stage of 4 teams: 6 matches	None	Final of the top 2 teams: 1 match
2000	4	League stage of 4 teams: 6 matches	None	Final of the top 2 teams: 1 match
2004	6	2 groups of 3 teams each: 6 matches	Super 4 (top 2 of each group): 6 matches	Final of the top 2 teams: 1 match
2008	6	2 groups of 3 teams each: 6 matches	Super 4 (top 2 of each group): 6 matches	Final of the top 2 teams: 1 match
2010	4	League stage of 4 teams: 6 matches	None	Final of the top 2 teams: 1 match
2012	4	League stage of 4 teams: 6 matches	None	Final of the top 2 teams: 1 match
2014	5	League stage of 5 teams: 10 matches	None	Final of the top 2 teams: 1 match
2016	5	League stage of 5 teams: 10 matches	None	Final of the top 2 teams: 1 match
2018	6	2 groups of 3 teams each: 6 matches	Super 4 (top 2 of each group): 6 matches	Final of the top 2 teams: 1 match
2022	6	2 groups of 3 teams each: 6 matches	Super 4 (top 2 of each group): 6 matches	Final of the top 2 teams: 1 match
2023	6	2 groups of 3 teams each: 6 matches	Super 4 (top 2 of each group): 6 matches	Final of the top 2 teams: 1 match
2025	8	2 groups of 4 teams each: 12 matches	Super 4 (top 2 of each group): 6 matches	Final of the top 2 teams: 1 match
2027	6	2 groups of 3 teams each: 6 matches	Super 4 (top 2 of each group): 6 matches	Final of the top 2 teams: 1 match
2029	8	2 groups of 4 teams each: 12 matches	Super 4 (top 2 of each group): 6 matches	Final of the top 2 teams: 1 match

== History ==
Winners of ACC Asia Cup
Season	Format	Champion
1984	ODI	India
1986	ODI	Sri Lanka
1988	ODI	India (2)
1990/91	ODI	India (3)
1995	ODI	India (4)
1997	ODI	Sri Lanka (2)
2000	ODI	Pakistan
2004	ODI	Sri Lanka (3)
2008	ODI	Sri Lanka (4)
2010	ODI	India (5)
2012	ODI	Pakistan (2)
2014	ODI	Sri Lanka (5)
2016	T20I	India (6)
2018	ODI	India (7)
2022	T20I	Sri Lanka (6)
2023	ODI	India (8)
2025	T20I	India (9)
2027	ODI	

=== 1980s ===
The inaugural edition of the Rothmans Asia Cup took place in Sharjah, UAE, in 1984, coinciding with the establishment of the Asian Cricket Council headquartered in the same city. The event featured a round-robin format between India, Sri Lanka, and Pakistan. India won both its matches to claim the first title, while Sri Lanka finished second after defeating Pakistan.

Sri Lanka hosted the second edition in 1986. India withdrew from the tournament due to strained cricketing relations with Sri Lanka after a controversial series the previous year. Bangladesh participated for the first time. Sri Lanka won the tournament by defeating Pakistan in the final.

The third edition, in 1988, was held in Bangladesh, marking the first time a multi-national cricket tournament was staged there. In the final, India beat Sri Lanka by six wickets to claim their second Asia Cup.

=== 1990s ===
The fourth edition of the tournament was held in India in 1990–91. Pakistan withdrew because of strained political relations with India. India retained the Asia Cup by defeating Sri Lanka in the final. In 1993, the tournament was cancelled due to continued political tensions between India and Pakistan.

The fifth edition, in 1995, returned to Sharjah, UAE after eleven years. India and Sri Lanka reached the final by virtue of a superior run rate over Pakistan, as all three teams finished the preliminary round with equal points. For the third successive time, India defeated Sri Lanka in the final.

The sixth edition was held in Sri Lanka in 1997, where the hosts beat India in the final by eight wickets to win their second Asia Cup.

=== 2000s ===
The seventh edition of the Asia Cup was held in Bangladesh in 2000, marking the second time the country hosted the tournament. Pakistan and Sri Lanka reached the final, while India won only one match (against Bangladesh) and, for the first time, failed to qualify for the final. Pakistan defeated Sri Lanka to win their maiden Asia Cup title, with Yousuf Youhana named Player of the Tournament.

The 8th edition took place in Sri Lanka in 2004 with a new format. UAE and Hong Kong joined the competition for the first time, making it a six-team event divided into three stages – Group Stage, Super Fours, and the Final. Sri Lanka, India, and UAE were placed in Group A, while Pakistan, Bangladesh, and Hong Kong were in Group B. UAE and Hong Kong were eliminated in the group stage. Bangladesh progressed to the Super Fours for the first time in a major tournament but failed to perform. India and Sri Lanka topped the Super Fours to reach the final, where Sri Lanka defeated India by 25 runs. Sanath Jayasuriya was awarded Player of the Tournament.

The 9th edition was hosted by Pakistan from 24 June to 6 July 2008, following the same format as 2004. Sri Lanka and Bangladesh qualified from Group A, while India and Pakistan advanced from Group B. In the Super Fours, India and Sri Lanka finished on top to enter the final. Sri Lanka won their fourth Asia Cup by defeating India by 100 runs. Sanath Jayasuriya scored 125 off 114 balls to rescue Sri Lanka from 66/4, while mystery spinner Ajantha Mendis produced a match-winning spell of 6/13. Mendis was named Player of the Tournament.

=== 2010s ===
The tenth edition was held in Sri Lanka, between 15 and 24 June 2010 hosting the Asia Cup for the fourth time. It only featured the four Test playing Asian nations, and seven matches were played in all (including the final). Sri Lanka and India topped the group stages and entered the final. In the final, India beat Sri Lanka comfortably to become champions for the fifth time, winning the tournament for first time in 15 years. Shahid Afridi was the Player of the Tournament.

The eleventh edition of the Asia Cup was held in Dhaka, Bangladesh, from 11 to 22 March 2012. Pakistan and Bangladesh qualified to play in the final of the eleventh edition, Bangladesh had beaten India and Sri Lanka to book their place in the final for the first time in the history of the tournament. Pakistan beat Bangladesh after a thrilling final over, winning their second Asia Cup. Shakib Al Hasan was adjudged the Player of the Tournament. Sachin Tendulkar scored his 100th international century in this tournament.

The twelfth edition was held in Dhaka and Fatullah, Bangladesh, from 25 February to 8 March 2014. The tournament consisted of five teams with Afghanistan in it for the first time since its inception in 1984. Sri Lanka defeated Pakistan by 5 wickets in the final to win the Asia Cup for the fifth time. Lahiru Thirimanne was adjudged the Player of the Tournament scoring 279 runs.

After the Asian Cricket Council was downsized by the ICC in 2015, it was announced that Asia Cup tournaments would be played on rotation basis in ODI and T20I format. As a result, 2016 events was the first tournament in T20I format and was played by five teams just ahead of 2016 ICC World Twenty20. The 2016 edition of the Asia Cup tournament was held in Bangladesh for the third consecutive time from 24 February to 6 March. The final was held on 6 March 2016. India won the final by beating Bangladesh by 8 wickets in the final held at the Sher-e-Bangla National Stadium situated in Mirpur locality, Dhaka, Bangladesh. It is for the sixth time that India won the Asia cup title in 2016. Shikhar Dhawan of India was the man of the match for his 60 runs. Sabbir Rahman of Bangladesh was the player of the series. India won all of its matches played in Asia Cup 2016 beating Bangladesh 2 times, Pakistan, Sri Lanka and UAE.

On 29 October 2015, following the Asian Cricket Council meeting in Singapore, BCCI secretary Anurag Thakur stated that the 2018 edition of the tournament would be held in India. It will follow the ODI format. However, in April 2018, the tournament was moved to the United Arab Emirates, due to political tensions between India and Pakistan.

India were the defending champions, and retained their title, after beating Bangladesh by three wickets in the final. India did not suffer a single defeat in the tournament, with 2 wins each against Pakistan & Bangladesh, a solitary win against Hong Kong, and a tie with Afghanistan. Shikhar Dhawan was the top run getter with 342 runs in 5 matches, was awarded Man of the Series. Afghanistan was the only team in the tournament who remained unbeaten against eventual winners India.

=== 2020s ===
The United Arab Emirates hosted the tournament and Sri Lanka won the Asia Cup beating Pakistan by 23 runs in the final. Sri Lanka reached the final as the only unbeaten team in the Super-Four stage winning against Afghanistan, India, and Pakistan. Bhanuka Rajapaksa was awarded Man of the Match for his unbeaten 71 off 45 balls, and Wanindu Hasaranga was second highest wicket-taker with 9 wickets in 6 matches, scored 66 runs in 5 innings and was named Player of the Series. Pakistan had an average start in the Asia Cup with a defeat against India in the group stage, beating India & Afghanistan in a close encounter in Super 4, ending with 2 back-to-back defeats against Sri Lanka. India started the tournament as hot favourites defeating Pakistan; however, they could not win against them and Sri Lanka in the super 4 and got knocked out of the tournament. Afghanistan was the only team in the tournament to defeat the eventual winners Sri Lanka.

Pakistan was awarded to host the tournament in 2023. However, the Indian cricket team was reluctant to visit Pakistan to participate in the tournament. So, after a lot of deliberation, India agreed to play in a hybrid model where India will play all their matches in another country and few other matches will be hosted in Pakistan. Thus, it was the first Asia Cup to be co-hosted by multiple countries; four matches were played in Pakistan, and the remaining nine matches were played in Sri Lanka. The five full members of the Asian Cricket Council were joined by Nepal, who made their ACC Asia Cup debut having qualified for the first time in qualifying the 2023 ACC Men's Premier Cup. India, Pakistan, Nepal, Bangladesh, Sri Lanka and Afghanistan qualified to play in the tournament. India, Pakistan, Bangladesh, and Sri Lanka qualified to play the Super fours stage. India and Pakistan played the finals, in which India defeated Pakistan by 5 wickets to win their ninth Asia cup title.

== Revenue distribution ==
Around 80% of the tournament's revenue is generated from matches featuring India and Pakistan. To meet broadcasting demands, the two teams are often placed in the same group for commercial reasons. The five Full Members each receive approximately 15% of total revenue, with the remaining amount distributed among Associate and Affiliate national boards. The BCCI has publicly stated that it donates a portion of its share to smaller boards to support cricket development within and outside Asia.

== Results ==
Year	Format	Host(s)	No. of teams	Final			
Year	Format	Host(s)	No. of teams	Venue	Champions	Result	Runners-up
1984; Details	ODI	(United Arab Emirates)	3	Sharjah Cricket Stadium, Sharjah	India	No finals; India won the tournament via Round-robin format	Sri Lanka
1986; Details	ODI	(Sri Lanka)	3	Singhalese Sports Club Cricket Ground, Colombo	Sri Lanka; 195/5 (42.2 overs)	Sri Lanka won by 5 wickets (scorecard)	Pakistan; 191/9 (45 overs)
1988; Details	ODI	(Bangladesh)	4	Bangabandhu National Stadium, Dhaka	India; 180/4 (37.1 overs)	India won by 6 wickets (scorecard)	Sri Lanka; 176 (43.5 overs)
1990/91; Details	ODI	(India)	3	Eden Gardens, Calcutta	India; 205/3 (42.1 overs)	India won by 7 wickets (scorecard)	Sri Lanka; 204/9 (45 overs)
1995; Details	ODI	(United Arab Emirates)	4	Sharjah Cricket Stadium, Sharjah	India; 233/2 (41.5 overs)	India won by 8 wickets (scorecard)	Sri Lanka; 230/7 (50 overs)
1997; Details	ODI	(Sri Lanka)	4	R. Premadasa Stadium, Colombo	Sri Lanka; 240/2 (36.5 overs)	Sri Lanka won by 8 wickets (scorecard)	India; 239/7 (50 overs)
2000; Details	ODI	(Bangladesh)	4	Bangabandhu National Stadium, Dhaka	Pakistan; 277/4 (50 overs)	Pakistan won by 39 runs (scorecard)	Sri Lanka; 238 (45.2 overs)
2004; Details	ODI	(Sri Lanka)	6	R. Premadasa Stadium, Colombo	Sri Lanka; 228/9 (50 overs)	Sri Lanka won by 25 runs (scorecard)	India; 203/9 (50 overs)
2008; Details	ODI	(Pakistan)	6	National Stadium, Karachi	Sri Lanka; 273 (49.5 overs)	Sri Lanka won by 100 runs (scorecard)	India; 173 (39.3 overs)
2010; Details	ODI	(Sri Lanka)	4	Rangiri Dambulla International Stadium, Dambulla	India; 268/6 (50 overs)	India won by 81 runs (scorecard)	Sri Lanka; 187 (44.4 overs)
2012; Details	ODI	(Bangladesh)	4	Sher-e-Bangla National Cricket Stadium, Mirpur	Pakistan; 236/9 (50 overs)	Pakistan won by 2 runs (scorecard)	Bangladesh; 234/8 (50 overs)
2014; Details	ODI	(Bangladesh)	5	Sher-e-Bangla National Cricket Stadium, Mirpur	Sri Lanka; 261/5 (46.2 overs)	Sri Lanka won by 5 wickets (scorecard)	Pakistan; 260/5 (50 overs)
2016; Details	T20I	(Bangladesh)	5	Sher-e-Bangla National Cricket Stadium, Mirpur	India; 122/2 (13.5 overs)	India won by 8 wickets (scorecard)	Bangladesh; 120/5 (15 overs)
2018; Details	ODI	(United Arab Emirates)	6	Dubai International Cricket Stadium, Dubai	India; 223/7 (50 overs)	India won by 3 wickets (scorecard)	Bangladesh; 222 (48.3 overs)
2022; Details	T20I	(United Arab Emirates)	6	Dubai International Cricket Stadium, Dubai	Sri Lanka; 170/6 (20 overs)	Sri Lanka won by 23 runs (scorecard)	Pakistan; 147 (20 overs)
2023; Details	ODI	(Pakistan) (Sri Lanka)	6	R. Premadasa Stadium, Colombo	India; 51/0 (6.1 overs)	India won by 10 wickets (scorecard)	Sri Lanka; 50 (15.2 overs)
2025; Details	T20I	(United Arab Emirates)	8	Dubai International Cricket Stadium, Dubai	India; 150/5 (19.4 overs)	India won by 5 wickets (scorecard)	Pakistan; 146 (19.1 overs)
2027; Details	ODI	(Bangladesh)	6	Sher-e-Bangla National Cricket Stadium, Mirpur			

== Tournament summary ==
=== Overall ===
The table below provides an overview of the performances of teams over past Asia Cup ODI and T20I tournaments.

Team	Appearances			Best result
Team	Total	First	Latest	Best result
India	16	1984	2025	Champions (1984, 1988, 1990–91, 1995, 2010, 2016, 2018, 2023, 2025)
Sri Lanka	17	1984	2025	Champions (1986, 1997, 2004, 2008, 2014, 2022)
Pakistan	16	1984	2025	Champions (2000, 2012)
Bangladesh	16	1986	2025	Runners-up (2012, 2016, 2018)
Afghanistan	5	2014	2025	Super Four (2018, 2022)
Hong Kong	5	2004	2025	Group Stage (2004, 2008, 2018, 2022, 2025)
United Arab Emirates	4	2004	2025	Group Stage (2004, 2008, 2016, 2025)
Nepal	1	2023		Group Stage (2023)
Oman	1	2025		Group Stage (2025)

=== ODIs ===
The table below provides an overview of the performances of teams over past Asia Cup ODI tournaments.

Team	Appearances			Best result	Statistics					
Team	Total	First	Latest	Best result	Played	Won	Lost	Tie	NR	Win%
India	13	1984	2023	Champions (1984, 1988, 1990–91, 1995, 2010, 2018, 2023)	55	35	17	1	2	66.98
Sri Lanka	14	1984	2023	Champions (1986, 1997, 2004, 2008, 2014)	55	38	17	0	0	67.85
Pakistan	13	1984	2023	Champions (2000, 2012)	50	28	20	0	2	58.33
Bangladesh	13	1986	2023	Runners-up (2012, 2018)	48	9	39	0	0	18.75
Afghanistan	3	2014	2023	Super Four (2018)	11	3	7	1	0	31.81
Hong Kong	3	2004	2018	Group Stage (2004, 2008, 2018)	6	0	6	0	0	0.00
Nepal	1	2023	2023	Group Stage (2023)	2	0	2	0	0	0.00
United Arab Emirates	2	2004	2008	Group Stage (2004, 2008)	4	0	4	0	0	0.00

=== T20Is ===
The table below provides an overview of the performances of teams in the Asia Cup T20I tournament.

Team	Appearances			Best result	Statistics					
Team	Total	First	Latest	Best result	Played	Won	Lost	Tie	NR	Win%
India	3	2016	2025	Champions (2016, 2025)	17	15	2	0	0	88.23
Sri Lanka	3	2016	2025	Champions (2022)	16	9	7	0	0	56.25
Pakistan	3	2016	2025	Runners-up (2022, 2025)	16	9	7	0	0	56.25
Bangladesh	3	2016	2025	Runners-up (2016)	13	6	7	0	0	46.15
Afghanistan	2	2022	2025	Super Four (2022)	8	3	5	0	0	37.50
United Arab Emirates	2	2016	2025	Group Stage (2016, 2025)	7	1	6	0	0	14.29
Hong Kong	2	2022	2025	Group Stage (2022, 2025)	5	0	5	0	0	00.00
Oman	1	2025		Group Stage (2025)	3	0	3	0	0	00.00

Note:

- The win percentage excludes no-result matches and counts ties as half a win.
- Teams are sorted by best result, then winning percentage, then (if equal) by alphabetical order.

== Performance by teams ==
1st	Champion
2nd	Runners-up
3rd	2nd Runners-up
DNQ	Did not qualify
Q	Qualified
WD	Withdrawn
GS	Group stage
	ICC Full Member Nation

An overview of the teams' performances in every Asia Cup:

India has most titles i.e. 9, while Sri Lanka has second highest 6.

Host Team	1984 ODI	1986 ODI	1988 ODI	1990/91 ODI	1995 ODI	1997 ODI	2000 ODI	2004 ODI	2008 ODI	2010 ODI	2012 ODI	2014 ODI	2016 T20I	2018 ODI	2022 T20I	2023 ODI	2025 T20I	2027 ODI
Host Team	(United Arab Emirates)	(Sri Lanka)	(Bangladesh)	(India)	(United Arab Emirates)	(Sri Lanka)	(Bangladesh)	(Sri Lanka)	(Pakistan)	(Sri Lanka)	(Bangladesh)	(Bangladesh)	(Bangladesh)	(United Arab Emirates)	(United Arab Emirates)	(Pakistan) (Sri Lanka)	(United Arab Emirates)	(Bangladesh)
Afghanistan	—	—	—	—	—	—	—	—	DNQ	—	—	4th	DNQ	4th	4th	GS	GS	Q
Bahrain	—	—	—	—	—	—	—	—	DNQ	—	—	—	—	—	—	DNQ	DNQ	DNQ
Bangladesh	—	3rd	4th	3rd	4th	4th	4th	4th	4th	4th	2nd	5th	2nd	2nd	GS	3rd	3rd	Q
Cambodia	—	—	—	—	—	—	—	—	—	—	—	—	—	—	—	—	DNQ	DNQ
Hong Kong	—	DNQ	—	—	—	—	—	GS	GS	—	—	—	DNQ	GS	GS	DNQ	GS	DNQ
India	1st	WD	1st	1st	1st	2nd	3rd	2nd	2nd	1st	3rd	3rd	1st	1st	3rd	1st	1st	Q
Kuwait	—	—	—	—	—	—	—	—	—	—	—	—	—	—	DNQ	DNQ	DNQ	DNQ
Malaysia	—	—	—	—	—	—	DNQ	DNQ	DNQ	—	—	—	—	DNQ	DNQ	DNQ	DNQ	DNQ
Nepal	—	—	—	—	—	—	—	DNQ	DNQ	—	—	—	—	DNQ	DNQ	GS	DNQ	Q
Oman	—	—	—	—	—	—	—	—	DNQ	—	—	—	DNQ	DNQ	DNQ	DNQ	GS	DNQ
Pakistan	3rd	2nd	3rd	WD	3rd	3rd	1st	3rd	3rd	3rd	1st	2nd	3rd	3rd	2nd	4th	2nd	Q
Qatar	—	—	—	—	—	—	—	—	DNQ	—	—	—	—	—	—	DNQ	DNQ	DNQ
Saudi Arabia	—	—	—	—	—	—	—	—	DNQ	—	—	—	—	—	—	DNQ	DNQ	DNQ
Singapore	—	DNQ	—	—	—	—	—	DNQ	DNQ	—	—	—	—	DNQ	DNQ	DNQ	DNQ	DNQ
Sri Lanka	2nd	1st	2nd	2nd	2nd	1st	2nd	1st	1st	2nd	4th	1st	4th	GS	1st	2nd	4th	Q
United Arab Emirates	—	—	—	—	—	—	—	GS	GS	—	—	—	5th	DNQ	DNQ	DNQ	GS	DNQ

=== Debutant teams in final tournament ===
Year	Teams
1984	India; Pakistan; Sri Lanka
1986	Bangladesh
2004	Hong Kong; United Arab Emirates
2014	Afghanistan
2023	Nepal
2025	Oman

=== Debutant teams in Asia Cup Qualifier ===
Year	Teams
2000	Hong Kong, Japan, Kuwait, Malaysia, Maldives, Nepal, Singapore, United Arab Emirates
2006	Afghanistan, Bahrain, Bhutan, Brunei, Iran, Myanmar, Oman, Qatar, Saudi Arabia, Thailand
2016	None
2018	None
2022	Kuwait
2023	None
2024	Cambodia

== Championship summary ==
Rank	Teams	Appearance	Titles	Runners-up
1	India	16	9	3
2	Sri Lanka	17	6	7
3	Pakistan	16	2	4
4	Bangladesh	16	0	3

== Ranking ==
=== Results ===
#	Year	Host	1st	2nd	3rd	4th	5th	6th	7th	8th	Teams
1	1984	UAE	IND	SRI	PAK						3
2	1986	SRI	SRI	PAK	BAN						3
3	1988	BAN	IND	SRI	PAK	BAN					4
4	1990-91	IND	IND	SRI	BAN						3
5	1995	UAE	IND	SRI	PAK	BAN					4
6	1997	SRI	SRI	IND	PAK	BAN					4
7	2000	BAN	PAK	SRI	IND	BAN					4
8	2004	SRI	SRI	IND	PAK	BAN	UAE	HKG			6
9	2008	PAK	SRI	IND	PAK	BAN	UAE	HKG			6
10	2010	SRI	IND	SRI	PAK	BAN					4
11	2012	BAN	PAK	BAN	IND	SRI					4
12	2014	BAN	SRI	PAK	IND	AFG	BAN				5
13	2016	BAN	IND	BAN	PAK	SRI	UAE				5
14	2018	UAE	IND	BAN	PAK	AFG	HKG	SRI			6
15	2022	UAE	SRI	PAK	IND	AFG	BAN	HKG			6
16	2023	PAK SRI	IND	SRI	BAN	PAK	AFG	NEP			6
17	2025	UAE	IND	PAK	BAN	SRI	AFG	UAE	HKG	OMA	8
16	2027	BAN									6

=== Medals ===
Rank	Nation	Gold	Silver	Bronze	Total
1	India (IND)	9	3	4	16
2	Sri Lanka (SRI)	6	7	0	13
3	Pakistan (PAK)	2	4	9	15
4	Bangladesh (BAN)	0	3	4	7
Totals (4 entries)		17	17	17	51

=== Summary ===
Rank	Team	Part	M	W	L	T	NR	W/L
1	India	16	72	50	19	1	3	2.631
2	Sri Lanka	17	71	47	24	0	5	1.958
3	Pakistan	16	66	37	27	0	2	1.370
4	Bangladesh	16	61	15	46	0	0	0.326
5	Afghanistan	5	22	8	13	1	0	0.615
6	Nepal	1	2	0	2	0	0	0.000
7	United Arab Emirates	4	11	1	10	0	0	0.100
8	Hong Kong	5	11	0	11	0	0	0.000
9	Oman	1	3	0	3	0	0	0.000

=== Qualification ===
Year	Qualification tournament	Number of teams in qualification	Number of qualified teams
1984	No qualification		
1986	No qualification		
1988–2000	No qualification		
2004 Asia Cup	2000 ACC Trophy	8	2
2008 Asia Cup	2006 ACC Trophy	17	2
2010–2014	No qualification		
2016 Asia Cup	2016 Asia Cup Qualifier	4	1
2018 Asia Cup	2018 Asia Cup Qualifier	6	1
2022 Asia Cup	2022 Asia Cup Qualifier	4	1
2023 Asia Cup	2023 ACC Men's Premier Cup	10	1
2025 Asia Cup	2024 ACC Men's Premier Cup	10	3
2027 Asia Cup	2026 ACC Men's Premier Cup	10	1

== Broadcasters ==
Country or territory	Broadcasters	Year
Bangladesh	GTV, T Sports HD, Rabbithole Prime, Toffee (Offline), T sports app, Nagorik TV,	2022–27
Caribbean	RUSH Sports	2023
India and Nepal	Zee Network	2024–31
Sri Lanka	TV 1 (MTV Channel)	2025–27
Pakistan	PTV, Ten Sports	2022–23
Australia	Kayo Sports	2022
Middle East and North Africa	TV by e& and STARZON	2022–23
Malaysia	Astro Cricket	2022–23
Singapore	HUB Sports	2022–23
United Kingdom	TNT Sports	2022–23
Continental Europe, Australia, New Zealand, Japan, Malaysia and Southeast Asia	YuppTV	2016–23

== See also ==
- Asian Cricket Council
- Women's Asia Cup
- ACC Premier Cup
- ACC Men's Challenger Cup
- ACC Trophy
- ACC Twenty20 Cup
- ACC Women's Premier Cup
- List of Asia Cup cricket records
- Cricket World Cup
- ICC T20 World Cup
- India national cricket team
- Sri Lanka national cricket team
- Pakistan national cricket team
