= Lahiru Thirimanne =

Sri Lankan cricketer (born 1989)

Personal information
- Full name: Hettige Don Rumesh Lahiru Thirimanne
- Born: 9 August 1989 (age 37); Moratuwa, Sri Lanka
- Nickname: Thiri, Optimus
- Height: 5 ft 10 in (1.78 m)
- Batting: Left-handed
- Bowling: Right-arm medium-fast
- Role: Top-order batter

International information
- National side: Sri Lanka (2010–2022)
- Test debut (cap 116): 16 June 2011 v Pakistan
- Last Test: 12 March 2022 v India
- ODI debut (cap 143): 5 January 2010 v India
- Last ODI: 2 October 2019 v Pakistan
- ODI shirt no.: 66
- T20I debut (cap 44): 1 June 2012 v Pakistan
- Last T20I: 28 March 2016 v South Africa

Domestic team information
- Years: Team
- 2008–present: Ragama
- 2008–2009: Basnahira South
- 2015: Dhaka Dynamites

Career statistics
Competition	Test	ODI	FC	LA
Matches	43	127	135	223
Runs scored	2,080	3,194	8,539	6,007
Batting average	27.01	34.71	41.05	35.33
100s/50s	3/10	4/21	22/42	7/43
Top score	155*	139*	187*	139*
Balls bowled	84	104	270	120
Wickets	0	3	1	4
Bowling average	–	31.33	166.00	29.00
5 wickets in innings	–	0	0	0
10 wickets in match	–	0	0	0
Best bowling	–	2/36	1/13	2/36
Catches/stumpings	38/–	38/–	143/–	69/–
Medal record
Representing Sri Lanka
Men's Cricket
Asian Games
Gold medal – first place	2014 Incheon	Team
South Asian Games
Silver medal – second place	2010 Dhaka	Team
- Source: ESPNcricinfo, 12 March 2022

Hettige Don Rumesh Lahiru Thirimanne, known as Lahiru Thirimanne (Sinhala: හෙට්ටිගේ දොන් රුමේෂ් ළහිරු තිරිමාන්න; born 9 August 1989) is a Sri Lankan former international cricketer, and a former ODI captain. He is a left-handed opening batsman and a right-arm medium-fast bowler. He had also acted as a vice-captain of the Sri Lanka One Day International team, when he was dropped from the team after poor performances. He was recalled in 2018 for the national team. Thirimanne was a member of the Sri Lankan team that won the 2014 ICC World Twenty20, and the 2014 Asia Cup, where he was the player of the series in the Asia tournament.

For batsmen to play 50 or more Test innings in the top six in the batting order, Thirimanne's average of 22.06 was the worst in history, sitting just under the figure of 22.07 recorded by Bangladesh's Javed Omar in his 40-game Test career. Since maiden Test century at Galle he had gone seven years and 10 months without another, averaging 18.86 in 53 innings until his second Test century against England. But Thirimanne showed good comeback in the Test format in 2021.

On 22 July 2023, Thirimanne announced his retirement from international cricket and migrated to Australia.

== School career ==
Thirimanne began his cricketing career at S.Thomas' College, Bandarawela and played Under 11 cricket and his first coach was Sujeewa Gunarathne. He studied at S.Thomas' College Bandarawela initially as his father, who was employed at the Survey Department was transferred. After passing the grade 5 scholarship exam Lahiru joined Prince of Wales' College, Moratuwa and played in the Under 13, 15, 17 and 19 team.

== Domestic career ==
In March 2018, he was named in Colombo's squad for the 2017–18 Super Four Provincial Tournament. He was the leading run-scorer for Colombo during the tournament, with 198 runs in three matches.

The following month, he was also named in Colombo's squad for the 2018 Super Provincial One Day Tournament. In August 2018, he was named in Kandy's squad the 2018 SLC T20 League. In March 2019, he was named in Galle's squad for the 2019 Super Provincial One Day Tournament. In August 2021, he was signed up by Australia's Mulgrave Cricket Club ahead of the 2021/22 season.

== International career ==
=== Early success ===
He made his One Day International (ODI) debut in early 2010. He made his Test debut against England at the Rose Bowl in June 2011, coming into the side for the injured Tillakaratne Dilshan. In his first Test innings, he was dismissed for 10 runs caught behind off the bowling of James Anderson.

Thirimanne scored his first ODI century against Australia at Adelaide Oval during second ODI of 2012–13 Commonwealth Bank Series. It's also his first A List century. Thirimanne reached a deserved century by cutting Xavier Doherty backward of point for the winning runs. Lahiru Thirimanne's century is only the fifth by a Sri Lankan batsman in a chase against Australia (second in Adelaide). Aravinda de Silva has scored two centuries in chases. Also the 137-run stand between Thirimanne and Tillakaratne Dilshan is the second-highest second-wicket partnership for Sri Lanka against Australia. The highest is 163 between Sanath Jayasuriya and Kumar Sangakkara in Sydney in 2006. Finally, Sri Lanka won by 8 wickets with 59 balls remaining. Thirimanne won player of the match award for his performance.

During 1st test at Galle on 8 March 2013, during Bangladesh's tour of Sri Lanka, Thirimanne scored his maiden test century. His unbeaten 155 run helped to put up big total for Sri Lanka. Thirimanne was watchful. On 99, he gave Elias Sunny the charge, and picked up two runs to seal his landmark. Thirimanne was strong on the off side against the seamers. A single to cover took him past 150. He also put on 203 run partnership with Dinesh Chandimal. The 203-run stand between Chandimal and Thirimanne is the third-highest fifth-wicket partnership for Sri Lanka in Tests against Bangladesh. Finally the match was drawn.

=== Golden 2014-15 ===
During the 2014 Asia Cup in Bangladesh, he opened the batting with Kusal Perera, due to the injury of Tillakaratne Dilshan, who was not included in the series. He scored two magnificent hundreds against Pakistan, where he finally ended up being the highest run scorer in the tournament with 2 centuries with the average of 55.80. Eventually, Sri Lanka became champions for the fifth time in Asia Cup history. Thirimanne was adjudged man of the match of final and also player of the series.

During the 2015 ICC Cricket World Cup, Thirimanne started to open the batting with Tillakaratne Dilshan. Before the tournament, the Sri Lankan opening pair was struggling to pick up, but finally, it was sealed between Thirimanne and Dilshan. On 1 March 2015, he scored his 4th ODI century against England, where Sri Lanka successfully chased 309 runs. He added 212* runs for the second wicket partnership with Kumar Sangakkara to win the match. This remains the highest 2nd wicket partnership for Sri Lanka in ODI cricket. He was unbeaten 139 in the match.

=== Comeback ===
Thirimanne was not included in the international squad since January 2016 due to a string of poor performances in both domestic and international arena. In July 2017, he was included in the practice match against India and scored 56 runs. However, the score did not result in a call up for test series. With many injury concerns within the Sri Lanka squad, Thirimanne was recalled for the second Test at SSC, although he did not feature in the first XI.

Thirimanne was also not initially selected for the limited over series against India, but after the injury to Danushka Gunathilaka, and suspension of Upul Tharanga, Thirimanne along with Dinesh Chandimal were brought into the ODI side. He played in the third ODI and scored 80 runs, which was the highest scored for Sri Lanka in the match. However, Sri Lanka lost the match and also lost the eighth consecutive ODI series to India.

In May 2018, he was one of 33 cricketers to be awarded a national contract by Sri Lanka Cricket ahead of the 2018–19 season.

In April 2019, he was named in Sri Lanka's squad for the 2019 Cricket World Cup. On 4 June 2019, in Sri Lanka's match against Afghanistan, Thirimanne scored his 3,000th run in ODI cricket.

In the first Test match against New Zealand in August 2019, Thirimanne scored a match winning half century in the fourth innings to chase down a target of 267. This is the first time a team has successfully chased down a fourth-innings target of more than 100 in Galle Stadium as well. New Zealand posted 267 runs in their second innings to win the match, where Thirimanne along with skipper Dimuth Karunaratne gave a strong opening partnership of 161 runs. This stand ranks as only the second instance where fourth innings of a Test match in Asia scored more than 150 run opening partnership.

During England tour of Sri Lanka 2021, on 1st test match Thirimanne scored his second test century. He scored 111 runs hitting 12 boundaries before being dismissed by Sam Curran. His test hundred was also his second in Galle, having hit an unbeaten 155 against Bangladesh in 2013 - Thirimanne was going for a Sri Lanka-record 54 innings between tons. Despite his fine innings, Sri Lanka subsequently lost the match by seven wickets. During the second match of the series, Thirimanne set a record for becoming the first Sri Lanka player to take five catches in an innings of a test match.

During first test match against West Indies, Thirimanne scored half centuries in both innings. In the first innings Sri Lanka team was all out for 169. And it was their second-lowest first-innings score in the Caribbean. The lowest had also been recorded by this team, essentially, in 2018. Lahiru Thirimanne scored 70 off 180 in first innings. In second innings, he put on 162 run partnership with Oshada Fernando including his 76 runs. Thirimanne meanwhile recorded consecutive 50-plus scores for the first time in his entire Test career. His boundaries, rare as they were, were nevertheless exquisite in their execution - be it a back foot punch through cover point, or textbook drives through mid-off. Much of his innings was spent waiting - waiting for the bowlers to bowl to him. He accomplished this by simply refusing to attack deliveries outside off, thus forcing the bowlers to adopt straighter lines. These he would work away either side of the wicket as needed.

In the second test match against West Indies Thirimanne scored his 9th test half century in first innings. It was his third consecutive half-century and in the second innings he put on century opening partnership with Dimuth Karunarathne and Sri Lanka managed to draw the match.

In April 2021, during first test match against Bangladesh, Thirimanne scored his 10th test half century and put on century opening partnership with Dimuth Karunaratne. He is the second highest test run scorer in 2021, only behind Joe Root. During second test match, Thirimanne and Dimuth Karunaratne added 209, Sri Lanka's first 200-plus opening stand since 2011, and the first in the country in 21 years. The partnership, which is also the pair's third consecutive century stand, ended when Karunaratne was caught behind off Bangladesh's debutant Shoriful Islam shortly after tea. In that process Thirimanne scored 2000 test runs and reached his third test century, his second century in 2021. He scored 140 runs in the match where Sri Lanka posted a huge first innings total of 493. Later Sri Lanka won the match by 202 runs and won the series.

=== Captaincy ===
Thirimanne captained the cricket team for 2014 Asian Games at Incheon, where Sri Lanka won the gold medal by defeating Afghanistan in the final.

On 23 January 2015, during the fifth ODI against New Zealand, he captained Sri Lanka, due to slight injury of captain Angelo Mathews. However, his first match as a captain did not get under way well, as they lost the match by 108 runs. He also took 2 wickets at that match, and scored 45 runs as an opener. He also captained the 6th and 7th ODIs of the series, where 6th ODI ended with a huge defeat, and 7th ODI was comfortably won under his captaincy. However, Sri Lanka lost the series 4–2 finally.

In 2019, ten Sri Lanka players including permanent ODI and T20I captain withdrew from the tour of Pakistan citing security concerns. Therefore, Thirimanne was announced as the ODI captain for the 3-match series. During the series, first ODI was abandoned due to heavy rain. Sri Lanka lost the next two games and lost the ODI series 2–0.
