= List of Pakistan One Day International cricket records =

One Day International (ODI) cricket is played between international cricket teams who are Full Members of the International Cricket Council (ICC) as well as the top four Associate members. Unlike Test matches, ODIs consist of one inning per team, having a limit in the number of overs, currently 50 overs per innings – although in the past this has been 55 or 60 overs. ODI cricket is List-A cricket, so statistics and records set in ODI matches also count toward List-A records. The earliest match recognised as an ODI was played between England and Australia in January 1971; since when there have been over 4,000 ODIs played by 28 teams. This is a list of Pakistan Cricket team's One Day International records. It is based on the List of One Day International cricket records, but concentrates solely on records dealing with the Pakistani cricket team. Pakistan played its first ever ODI in 1973.

== Key ==
The top five records are listed for each category, except for the team wins, losses, draws and ties, all round records and the partnership records. Tied records for fifth place are also included. Explanations of the general symbols and cricketing terms used in the list are given below. Specific details are provided in each category where appropriate. All records include matches played for Pakistan only, and are correct as of November 2020.

Key
Symbol	Meaning
†	Player or umpire is currently active in ODI cricket
‡	Even took place during a Cricket World Cup
*	Player remained not out or partnership remained unbroken
♠	One Day International cricket record
Date	Starting date of the match
Innings	Number of innings played
Matches	Number of matches played
Opposition	The team Pakistan was playing against
Period	The time period when the player was active in ODI cricket
Player	The player involved in the record
Venue	One Day International cricket ground where the match was played

== Team records ==
=== Overall Record ===
Matches	Won	Lost	Tied	NR	Win %
1002	528	443	9	22	52.69
Last Updated: June 03, 2026

=== Team wins, losses, draws and ties ===
As of 2 June 2026, Pakistan have played 1002 ODI matches resulting in 528 victories, 443 defeats, 9 ties and 22 no results for an overall winning percentage of 52.69

Opponent	Matches	Won	Lost	Tied	No Result	% Won	First	Last
Full Members
Afghanistan	8	7	1	0	0	87.50	2012	2023
Australia	114	38	72	1	3	34.68	1975	2026
Bangladesh	42	35	7	0	0	83.33	1986	2026
England	92	32	57	0	3	34.78	1974	2023
India	136	73	58	0	5	53.68	1978	2025
Ireland	7	5	1	1	0	71.43	2007	2016
New Zealand	122	61	57	1	3	50	1973	2025
South Africa	90	36	53	0	1	40	1992	2025
Sri Lanka	160	96	59	1	4	60	1975	2025
West Indies	140	64	73	3	0	45.71	1975	2025
Zimbabwe	65	56	5	2	2	86.15	1992	2024
Associate Members
Canada	2	2	0	0	0	100.00	1979	2011
Hong Kong	3	3	0	0	0	100.00	2004	2018
Kenya	6	6	0	0	0	100.00	1996	2011
Namibia	1	1	0	0	0	100.00	2003	2003
Nepal	1	1	0	0	0	100.00	2023	2023
Netherlands	7	7	0	0	0	100.00	1996	2023
Scotland	3	3	0	0	0	100.00	1999	2013
United Arab Emirates	3	3	0	0	0	100.00	1994	2015
Total	1002	529	443	9	21	52.79	1973	2026
Statistics are correct as of Pakistan v Australia at Gaddafi Stadium, Lahore, 4 June 2026.

=== First bilateral ODI series wins ===
Opponent	Year of first Home win	Year of first Away win
Afghanistan	2012	2023
Australia	1982	2002
Bangladesh	2003	1999
England	2000	1974
India	1978	1987
New Zealand	1984	1994
South Africa	2025	2013
Sri Lanka	1982	1986
West Indies	1990	2005
Zimbabwe	1993	1993
Last updated: 26 August 2023

=== First ODI match wins ===
Opponent	Home		Away / Neutral	
Opponent	Venue	Year	Venue	Year
Afghanistan	Sharjah	2012	Fatullah	2014
Australia	Hyderabad (Sind)	1982	Nottingham	1979 ‡
Bangladesh	Multan	2003	Moratuwa	1986
Canada	YTP		Leeds	1979 ‡
England	Lahore	1978	Nottingham	1974
Hong Kong	Karachi	2008	Colombo (SSC)	2004
India	Sialkot	1978	Sharjah	1985
Ireland	YTP		Belfast	2011
Kenya	YTP		Nairobi	1996
Namibia	YTP		Kimberley	2003 ‡
Netherlands	Lahore	1996 ‡	Colombo (SSC)	2002
Nepal	Multan	2023	YTP	
New Zealand	Peshawar	1984	Nottingham	1983 ‡
Scotland	YTP		Chester-le-Street	1999 ‡
South Africa	Karachi	1994	Durban	1993
Sri Lanka	Karachi	1982	Nottingham	1975 ‡
United Arab Emirates	Gujranwala	1996 ‡	Sharjah	1994
West Indies	Lahore	1985	Adelaide	1981
Zimbabwe	Karachi	1993	Hobart	1992 ‡
Last updated: 1 July 2020

=== Winning every match in a series ===
In a bilateral series winning all matches is referred to as whitewash. First such event occurred when West Indies toured England in 1976. Pakistan have recorded 20 such series victories.

Opposition	Matches	Host	Season
Sri Lanka	4	Pakistan	1985/86
New Zealand	3	Pakistan	1990/91
West Indies	3	Pakistan	1990/91
Zimbabwe	3	Pakistan	1993/94
Zimbabwe	3	Pakistan	1996/97
West Indies	3	Canada	1999
Bangladesh	3	Bangladesh	2001/02
New Zealand	3	Pakistan	2002
Zimbabwe	5	Zimbabwe	2002/03
Bangladesh	5	Pakistan	2003
New Zealand	5	Pakistan	2003/04
West Indies	3	West Indies	2005
Zimbabwe	5	Pakistan	2007/08
Bangladesh	5	Pakistan	2007/08
West Indies	3	United Arab Emirates	2008/09
Zimbabwe	3	Zimbabwe	2011
Bangladesh	3	Bangladesh	2011/12
West Indies	3	United Arab Emirates	2016/17
Sri Lanka	5	United Arab Emirates	2017/18
Zimbabwe	5	Zimbabwe	2018
West Indies	3	Pakistan	2022
Netherlands	3	Netherlands	2022
Afghanistan	3	Sri Lanka	2023
South Africa	3	South Africa	2024/25
Last updated: 1 July 2020

=== Losing every match in a series ===
Pakistan have also suffered such whitewash 11 times.

Opposition	Matches	Host	Season
West Indies	3	Pakistan	1980/81
England	3	Pakistan	1987/88
West Indies	5	West Indies	1987/88
Australia	3	Pakistan	1998/99
Sri Lanka	3	Pakistan	1999/00
Australia	5	Australia	2009/10
England	4	United Arab Emirates	2011/12
Australia	3	United Arab Emirates	2014/15
Bangladesh	3	Bangladesh	2015
New Zealand	5	New Zealand	2017/18
Australia	5	United Arab Emirates	2018/19
England	3	England	2021
New Zealand	3	New Zealand	2024/25
Last updated: 13 July 2021

=== Team scoring records ===
==== Most runs in an innings ====
The highest innings total scored in ODIs came in the match between England and Australia in June 2018. Playing in the third ODI at Trent Bridge in Nottingham, the hosts posted a total of 481/6. The fourth ODI against Zimbabwe in July 2018 saw Pakistan set their highest innings total of 399/1.

Rank	Score	Opposition	Venue	Date	Scorecard
1	399/1	Zimbabwe	Queens Sports Club, Bulawayo, Zimbabwe	20 July 2018	Scorecard
2	385/7	Bangladesh	Rangiri Dambulla International Stadium, Dambulla, Sri Lanka	21 June 2010	Scorecard
3	375/3	Zimbabwe	Gaddafi Stadium, Lahore, Pakistan	26 May 2015	Scorecard
4	371/9	Sri Lanka	Gymkhana Club Ground, Nairobi, Kenya	4 October 1996	Scorecard
5	364/7	New Zealand	Sharjah Cricket Stadium, Sharjah, United Arab Emirates	14 December 2014	Scorecard
5	364/4	Zimbabwe	Queens Sports Club, Bulawayo, Zimbabwe	22 July 2018	Scorecard
Last updated: 1 July 2020

==== Fewest runs in an innings ====
The lowest innings total scored in ODIs has been scored twice. Zimbabwe were dismissed for 35 by Sri Lanka during the third ODI in Sri Lanka's tour of Zimbabwe in April 2004 and USA were dismissed for same score by Nepal in the sixth ODI of the 2020 ICC Cricket World League 2 in Nepal in February 2020. The lowest score in ODI history for Pakistan is 43 scored against West Indies in the 1992-93 Total International Series.

Rank	Score	Opposition	Venue	Date	Scorecard
1	43	West Indies	Sahara Park Newlands, Cape Town, South Africa	25 February 1993	Scorecard
2	71	West Indies	Brisbane Cricket Ground, Brisbane, Australia	9 January 1993	Scorecard
3	74	England	Adelaide Oval, Adelaide, Australia	1 March 1992 ‡	Scorecard
3	74	New Zealand	University Oval, Dunedin, New Zealand	13 January 2018	Scorecard
5	75	Sri Lanka	Gaddafi Stadium, Lahore, Pakistan	24 January 2009	Scorecard
Last updated: 1 July 2020

==== Most runs conceded an innings ====
The third ODI of the 2016 ODI Series against the England saw Pakistan concede their highest innings total of 444/3.

Rank	Score	Opposition	Venue	Date	Scorecard
1	444/3	England	Trent Bridge, Nottingham, England	30 August 2016	Scorecard
2	401/6	New Zealand	M.Chinnaswamy Stadium, Bengaluru, India	4 November 2023	Scorecard
3	392/6	South Africa	Centurion Park, Centurion, South Africa	4 February 2007	Scorecard
4	373/3	England	Rose Bowl, Southampton, England	11 May 2019	Scorecard
5	369/5	New Zealand	McLean Park, Napier, New Zealand	3 February 2015	Scorecard
5	369/7	Australia	Adelaide Oval, Adelaide, Australia	26 January 2017	Scorecard
Last updated: 1 July 2020

==== Fewest runs conceded in an innings ====
The lowest score conceded by Pakistan for a full inning is 59 against Afghanistan in 2023 at Hambantota.

Rank	Score	Opposition	Venue	Date	Scorecard
1	59	Afghanistan	Mahinda Rajapaksa International Cricket Stadium, Hambantota, Sri Lanka	22 August 2023	Scorecard
2	64	New Zealand	Sharjah Cricket Stadium, Sharjah, United Arab Emirates	15 April 1986	Scorecard
3	67	Zimbabwe	Queens Sports Club, Bulawayo, Zimbabwe	18 July 2018	Scorecard
4	74	New Zealand	Sharjah Cricket Stadium, Sharjah, United Arab Emirates	1 May 1990	Scorecard
5	78	Sri Lanka	Sharjah Cricket Stadium, Sharjah, United Arab Emirates	17 April 2002	Scorecard
Last updated: 1 July 2020

==== Most runs aggregate in a match ====
The highest match aggregate scored in ODIs came in the match between South Africa and Australia in the fifth ODI of March 2006 series at Wanderers Stadium, Johannesburg when South Africa scored 438/9 in response to Australia's 434/4. The second ODI against England in Rose Bowl, Southampton saw a total of 734 runs being scored.

Rank	Aggregate	Scores	Venue	Date	Scorecard
1	734/10	England (373/3) v Pakistan (361/7)	Rose Bowl, Southampton, England	11 May 2019	Scorecard
2	719/13	England (444/3) v Pakistan (275)	Trent Bridge, Nottingham, England	30 August 2016	Scorecard
3	717/13	Pakistan (358/9) v England (359/4)	Bristol County Ground, Bristol, England	14 May 2019	Scorecard
4	709/8	Pakistan (375/3) v Zimbabwe (334/5)	Gaddafi Stadium, Lahore, Pakistan	26 May 2015	Scorecard
5	707/9	South Africa (352/5) v Pakistan (355/5)	National Stadium, Karachi, Pakistan	12 February 2025	Scorecard
Last updated: 1 July 2020

==== Fewest runs aggregate in a match ====
The lowest match aggregate in ODIs is 71 when USA were dismissed for 35 by Nepal in the sixth ODI of the 2020 ICC Cricket World League 2 in Nepal in February 2020. The lowest match aggregate in ODI history for Pakistan is 88 scored ninth match of the 1992-93 Total International Series against West Indies, which is fifth lowest of all time.

Rank	Aggregate	Scores	Venue	Date	Scorecard
1	88/13	Pakistan (43) v West Indies (45/3)	Sahara Park Newlands, Cape Town, South Africa	25 February 1993	Scorecard
2	130/10	New Zealand (64) v Pakistan (66/0)	Sharjah Cricket Stadium, Sharjah, United Arab Emirates	15 April 1986	Scorecard
3	136/11	Zimbabwe (67) v Pakistan (69/1)	Queens Sports Club, Bulawayo, Zimbabwe	18 July 2018	Scorecard
4	143/11	Pakistan (71) v West Indies (72/1)	Brisbane Cricket Ground, Brisbane, Australia	9 January 1993	Scorecard
5	151/12	New Zealand (74) v Pakistan (77/2)	Sharjah Cricket Stadium, Sharjah, United Arab Emirates	1 May 1990	Scorecard
Last updated: 1 July 2020

=== Result records ===
An ODI match is won when one side has scored more runs than the total runs scored by the opposing side during their innings. If both sides have completed both their allocated innings and the side that fielded last has the higher aggregate of runs, it is known as a win by runs. This indicates the number of runs that they had scored more than the opposing side. If the side batting last wins the match, it is known as a win by wickets, indicating the number of wickets that were still to fall.

==== Greatest win margins (by runs) ====
The greatest winning margin by runs in ODIs was England's victory over South Africa by 342 runs in the third and final ODI of South Africa's 2025 tour of England. The largest victory recorded by Pakistan was during the Pakistan's tour of Ireland in 2016 by 255 runs.

Rank	Margin	Target	Opposition	Venue	Date
1	255 runs	338	Ireland	Malahide Cricket Club Ground, Dublin, Ireland	18 August 2016
2	244 runs	400	Zimbabwe	Queens Sports Club, Bulawayo, Zimbabwe	20 July 2018
3	238 runs	343	Nepal	Multan Cricket Stadium, Multan, Pakistan	30 August 2023
4	233 runs	321	Bangladesh	Bangabandhu National Stadium, Dhaka, Bangladesh	2 June 2000
5	217 runs	296	Sri Lanka	Sharjah Cricket Stadium, Sharjah, United Arab Emirates	17 April 2002
Last updated: 30 August 2023

==== Greatest win margins (by balls remaining) ====
The greatest winning margin by balls remaining in ODIs was England's victory over Canada by 8 wickets with 277 balls remaining in the 1979 Cricket World Cup. The largest victory recorded by Pakistan is during the Pakistan's tour of Zimbabwe in 2018 when they won by 9 wickets with 241 balls remaining.

Rank	Balls remaining	Margin	Opposition	Venue	Date
1	241	9 wickets	Zimbabwe	Queens Sports Club, Bulawayo, Zimbabwe	18 July 2018
2	206	8 wickets	New Zealand	Sharjah Cricket Stadium, Sharjah, United Arab Emirates	1 May 1990
3	202	9 wickets	Netherlands	Sinhalese Sports Club Ground, Colombo, Sri Lanka	21 September 2002
4	188	7 wickets	Kenya	Edgbaston, Birmingham, England	14 September 2004
5	182	10 wickets	Bangladesh	National Stadium, Karachi, Pakistan	4 July 2008
Last updated: 1 July 2020

==== Greatest win margins (by wickets) ====
A total of 55 matches have ended with chasing team winning by 10 wickets with West Indies winning by such margins a record 10 times. Pakistan have won an ODI match by this margin on four occasions.

Rank	Margin	Opposition	Venue	Date
1	10 wickets	New Zealand	Sharjah Cricket Stadium, Sharjah, United Arab Emirates	15 April 1986
1	10 wickets	Bangladesh	National Stadium, Karachi, Pakistan	4 July 2008
1	10 wickets	West Indies	Shere-e-Bangla Stadium, Mirpur, Bangladesh	23 March 2011 ‡
1	10 wickets	Zimbabwe	Harare Sports Club, Harare, Zimbabwe	11 September 2011
1	10 wickets	Zimbabwe	Queens Sports Club, Bulawayo, Zimbabwe	26 November 2024
2	9 wickets	United Arab Emirates	Sharjah Cricket Stadium, Sharjah, United Arab Emirates	17 April 1994
2	9 wickets	Sri Lanka	Ranasinghe Premadasa Stadium, Colombo, Sri Lanka	3 August 1994
2	9 wickets	Australia	Rawalpindi Cricket Stadium, Rawalpindi, Pakistan	22 October 1994
2	9 wickets	Sri Lanka	Jinnah Stadium, Gujranwala, Pakistan	29 September 1995
2	9 wickets	United Arab Emirates	Jinnah Stadium, Gujranwala, Pakistan	24 February 1996 ‡
2	9 wickets	Zimbabwe	Gaddafi Stadium, Lahore, Pakistan	1 November 1996
2	9 wickets	India	Gaddafi Stadium, Lahore, Pakistan	2 October 1997
2	9 wickets	Bangladesh	Bangabandhu National Stadium, Dhaka, Bangladesh	12 January 1998
2	9 wickets	New Zealand	Old Trafford, Manchester, England	16 June 1999 ‡
2	9 wickets	Sri Lanka	Gymkhana Club Ground, Nairobi, Kenya	8 October 2000
2	9 wickets	Netherlands	Sinhalese Sports Club Ground, Colombo, Sri Lanka	21 September 2002
2	9 wickets	Sri Lanka	Sharjah Cricket Stadium, Sharjah, United Arab Emirates	23 October 2017
2	9 wickets	Zimbabwe	Queens Sports Club, Bulawayo, Zimbabwe	16 July 2018
2	9 wickets	Zimbabwe	Queens Sports Club, Bulawayo, Zimbabwe	18 July 2018
2	9 wickets	Australia	Gaddafi Stadium, Lahore, Pakistan	2 April 2022
2	9 wickets	Australia	Adelaide Oval, Adelaide, Australia	8 November 2024
Last updated: 20 March 2023

==== Highest successful run chases ====
South Africa holds the record for the highest successful run chase which they achieved when they scored 438/9 in response to Australia's 434/9. Pakistan's highest innings total while chasing is 353 in a successful run chase against South Africa at Karachi, Pakistan during the tri nation series in Pakistan in 2025.

Rank	Score	Target	Opposition	Venue	Date
1	353/4	353	South Africa	National Stadium, Karachi, Pakistan	12 February 2025
2	349/4	349	Australia	Gaddafi Stadium, Lahore, Pakistan	31 March 2022
3	345/4	345	Sri Lanka	Rajiv Gandhi International Stadium, Hyderabad, India	10 October 2023
4	337/3	337	New Zealand	Rawalpindi Cricket Stadium, Rawalpindi, Pakistan	29 April 2023
5	329/7	327	Bangladesh	Shere-e-Bangla Stadium, Mirpur, Bangladesh	4 March 2014
Last updated: 1 July 2020

==== Narrowest win margins (by runs) ====
The narrowest run margin victory is by 1 run which has been achieved in 31 ODI's with Australia winning such games a record 6 times. Pakistan's has achieved any victory by 1 run on two occasions.

Rank	Margin	Opposition	Venue	Date
1	1 run	West Indies	Sharjah Cricket Stadium, Sharjah, United Arab Emirates	21 October 1991
1	1 run	South Africa	Axxess DSL St. Georges, Port Elizabeth, South Africa	27 November 2013
3	2 runs	Australia	Sydney Cricket Ground, Sydney, Australia	20 February 1990
3	2 runs	England	Lord's, London, England	12 June 2001
3	2 runs	Bangladesh	Shere-e-Bangla Stadium, Mirpur, Pakistan	22 March 2012
Last updated: 1 July 2020

==== Narrowest win margins (by balls remaining) ====
The narrowest winning margin by balls remaining in ODIs is by winning of the last ball which has been achieved 36 times with both South Africa winning seven times. Pakistan has achieved a victory by this margin on five occasions.

Rank	Balls remaining	Margin	Opposition	Venue	Date
1	0	1 wicket	New Zealand	Multan Cricket Stadium, Multan, PAK	7 December 1984
1	0	1 wicket	India	Sharjah Cricket Stadium, Sharjah, United Arab Emirates	18 April 1986
1	0	1 wicket	West Indies	Gaddafi Stadium, Lahore, Pakistan	16 October 1987 ‡
1	0	2 wickets	India	Brisbane Cricket Ground, Brisbane, Australia	10 January 2000
1	0	3 wickets	India	Sardar Patel Stadium, Ahmedabad, India	12 April 2005
1	0	3 wickets	South Africa	Centurion Park, Centurion, South Africa	2 April 2021
Last updated: 2 April 2021

==== Narrowest win margins (by wickets) ====
The narrowest margin of victory by wickets is 1 wicket which has settled 55 such ODIs. Both West Indies and New Zealand have recorded such victory on eight occasions. Pakistan has won the match by a margin of one wicket on seven occasions.

Rank	Margin	Opposition	Venue	Date
1	1 wicket	New Zealand	Multan Cricket Stadium, Multan, Pakistan	7 December 1984
1	1 wicket	India	Sharjah Cricket Stadium, Sharjah, United Arab Emirates	18 April 1986
1	1 wicket	Australia	WACA, Perth, Australia	2 January 1987
1	1 wicket	West Indies	Gaddafi Stadium, Lahore, Pakistan	16 October 1987 ‡
1	1 wicket	South Africa	Sheikh Zayed Cricket Stadium, Abu Dhabi, United Arab Emirates	31 October 2010
1	1 wicket	South Africa	Dubai International Cricket Stadium, Dubai, United Arab Emirates	5 November 2010
1	1 wicket	India	Shere-e-Bangla Stadium, Mirpur, Bangladesh	2 March 2014
1	1 wicket	Afghanistan	Mahinda Rajapaksa International Cricket Stadium, Hambantota, Sri Lanka	24 August 2023
1	1 wicket	England	Gaddafi Stadium, Lahore, Pakistan	25 October 2026
Last updated: 1 July 2020

==== Greatest loss margins (by runs) ====
Pakistan's biggest defeat by runs was against Sri Lanka in the Sri Lanka's ill-fated tour of Pakistan in early 2009 at Gaddafi Stadium, Lahore, Pakistan.

Rank	Margin	Opposition	Venue	Date
1	234 runs	Sri Lanka	Gaddafi Stadium, Lahore, Pakistan	24 January 2009
2	228 runs	India	R Premadasa Stadium, Colombo, Sri Lanka	10 September 2023
3	224 runs	Australia	Gymkhana Club Ground, Nairobi, Kenya	30 August 2002
4	202 runs	West Indies	Brian Lara Cricket Academy, San Fernando, Trinidad and Tobago	12 August 2025
5	198 runs	England	Trent Bridge, Nottingham, England	20 August 1992
Last updated: 1 July 2020

==== Greatest loss margins (by balls remaining) ====
The greatest winning margin by balls remaining in ODIs was England's victory over Canada by 8 wickets with 277 balls remaining in the 1979 Cricket World Cup. The largest defeat suffered by Pakistan was against West Indies in South Africa during the 1992-93 Total International Series when they lost by 7 wickets with 225 balls remaining.

Rank	Balls remaining	Margin	Opposition	Venue	Date
1	225	7 wickets	West Indies	Sahara Park Newlands, Cape Town, South Africa	25 February 1993
2	218	7 wickets	West Indies	Trent Bridge, Nottingham, England	31 May 2019 ‡
3	216	10 wickets	South Africa	Sahara Park Newlands, Cape Town, South Africa	11 February 2007
4	196	9 wickets	New Zealand	Westpac Stadium, Wellington, New Zealand	22 January 2011
5	185	9 wickets	Australia	Gymkhana Club Ground, Nairobi, Kenya	4 September 2002
Last updated: 1 July 2020

==== Greatest loss margins (by wickets) ====
Pakistan have lost an ODI match by a margin of 10 wickets on three occasions with most recent being during the fifth match of the Pakistan's tour of West Indies in 2011.

Rank	Margins	Opposition	Most recent venue	Date
1	10 wickets	West Indies	Melbourne Cricket Ground, Melbourne, Australia	23 February 1992 ‡
1	10 wickets	South Africa	Sahara Park Newlands, Cape Town, South Africa	11 February 2007
1	10 wickets	West Indies	Providence Stadium, Providence, Guyana	5 May 2011
4	9 wickets	West Indies	Sharjah Cricket Stadium, Sharjah, United Arab Emirates	28 November 1986
4	9 wickets	Australia	Adelaide Oval, Adelaide, Australia	11 December 1988
4	9 wickets	West Indies	Brisbane Cricket Ground, Brisbane, Australia	9 January 1993
4	9 wickets	South Africa	Sahara Park Newlands, Cape Town, South Africa	23 April 1998
4	9 wickets	Australia	Lord's, London, England	23 June 2001
4	9 wickets	Australia	Gymkhana Club Ground, Nairobi, Kenya	4 September 2002
4	9 wickets	South Africa	Boland Park, Paarl, South Africa	16 December 2002
4	9 wickets	Australia	Sydney Cricket Ground, Sydney, Australia	23 January 2005
4	9 wickets	South Africa	New Wanderers Stadium, Johannesburg, South Africa	14 February 2007
4	9 wickets	New Zealand	Westpac Stadium, Wellington, New Zealand	22 January 2011
4	9 wickets	England	Dubai International Cricket Stadium, Dubai, United Arab Emirates	18 February 2012
4	9 wickets	India	Dubai International Cricket Stadium, Dubai, United Arab Emirates	23 September 2018
4	9 wickets	England	Sophia Gardens, Cardiff, England	8 July 2021
Last updated: 8 July 2021

==== Narrowest loss margins (by runs) ====
The narrowest loss of Pakistan in terms of runs is by 1 runs suffered four times.

Rank	Margin	Opposition	Venue	Date
1	1 run	Australia	Sheikh Zayed Cricket Stadium, Abu Dhabi, United Arab Emirates	12 October 2014
1	1 run	New Zealand	Jinnah Stadium, Sialkot, Pakistan	16 October 1976
1	1 run	South Africa	Sharjah Cricket Stadium, Sharjah, United Arab Emirates	30 October 2013
1	1 run	West Indies	Kensington Oval, Bridgetown, Barbados	2 May 2011
5	2 runs	South Africa	Dubai International Cricket Stadium, Dubai, United Arab Emirates	2 November 2010
Last updated: 1 July 2020

==== Narrowest loss margins (by balls remaining) ====
The narrowest winning margin by balls remaining in ODIs is by winning of the last ball which has been achieved 36 times with both South Africa winning seven times. Pakistan has suffered loss by this margin three times.

Rank	Balls remaining	Margin	Opposition	Venue	Date
1	0	3 wickets	England	Zafar Ali Stadium, Sahiwal, Pakistan	23 December 1977
1	0	4 wickets	West Indies	National Stadium, Karachi, Pakistan	21 November 1980
1	0	2 wickets	Australia	Centurion Park, Centurion, South Africa	30 September 2009
1	0	2 wickets	Sri Lanka	R. Premadasa Stadium, Colombo, Sri Lanka	14 September 2023
4	1	1 wicket	New Zealand	AMI Stadium, Christchurch, New Zealand	17 December 1995
4	1	3 wickets	India	Bangabandhu National Stadium, Dhaka, Bangladesh	18 January 1998
4	1	3 wickets	India	Rangiri Dambulla International Stadium, Dambulla, Sri Lanka	19 June 2010
Last updated: 1 July 2020

==== Narrowest loss margins (by wickets) ====
Pakistan has suffered defeat by 1 wicket on six occasions.

Rank	Margin	Opposition	Venue	Date
1	1 wicket	West Indies	Edgbaston, Birmingham, England	11 June 1975 ‡
1	1 wicket	West Indies	Brisbane Cricket Ground, Brisbane, Australia	16 January 1982
1	1 wicket	West Indies	Adelaide Oval, Adelaide, Australia	28 January 1984
1	1 wicket	England	Edgbaston, Birmingham, England	25 May 1987
1	1 wicket	West Indies	Sharjah Cricket Stadium, Sharjah, United Arab Emirates	17 October 1991
1	1 wicket	New Zealand	AMI Stadium, Christchurch, NZ	17 December 1995
1	1 wicket	South Africa	M.A. Chidambaram Stadium, Chennai, India	27 October 2023
Last updated: 1 July 2020

==== Tied matches ====
A tie can occur when the scores of both teams are equal at the conclusion of play, provided that the side batting last has completed their innings. There have been 37 ties in ODIs history with Pakistan involved in 8 such games.

Opposition	Venue	Date
West Indies	Gaddafi Stadium, Lahore, Pakistan	22 November 1991
Sri Lanka	Sharjah Cricket Stadium, Sharjah, United Arab Emirates	15 October 1999
Australia	Bellerive Oval, Hobart, Australia	10 December 1992
West Indies	Bourda, Georgetown, Guyana	3 April 1993
New Zealand	Eden Park, Auckland, New Zealand	13 March 1994
Zimbabwe	Harare Sports Club, Harare, Zimbabwe	22 February 1995
Ireland	Clontarf Cricket Club Ground, Dublin, Ireland	23 May 2013
West Indies	Darren Sammy National Cricket Stadium, Gros Islet, Saint Lucia	19 July 2013
Zimbabwe	Rawalpindi Cricket Stadium, Rawalpindi, Pakistan	3 November 2020
Last updated: 3 November 2020

== Individual records ==
=== Batting records ===
==== Most career runs ====
A run is the basic means of scoring in cricket. A run is scored when the batsman hits the ball with his bat and with his partner runs the length of 22 yards (20 m) of the pitch. India's Sachin Tendulkar has scored the most runs in ODIs with 18,246. Second is Kumar Sangakkara of Sri Lanka with 14,234 ahead of Ricky Ponting from Australia in third with 13,704. Inzamam-ul-Haq is the leading Pakistani on this list.

Rank	Runs	Player	Matches	Innings	Period
1	11,701	Inzamam-ul-Haq	375	348	1991–2007
2	9,554	Mohammad Yousuf	281	267	1998–2010
3	8,824	Saeed Anwar	247	244	1989–2003
4	8,027	Shahid Afridi	393	364	1996–2015
5	7,534	Shoaib Malik	287	258	1999–2019
6	7,381	Javed Miandad	233	218	1975–1996
7	7,249	Younis Khan	265	255	2000–2015
8	7,170	Saleem Malik	283	256	1982–1999
9	6,626	Babar Azam	143	140	2015–active
10	6,614	Mohammad Hafeez	218	216	2003–2019
Last updated: 9 January 2023

==== Fastest runs getter ====
Runs	Batsman	Match	Innings	Record Date	Reference
1000	Fakhar Zaman †	18	18 ♠	22 July 2018	
2000	Zaheer Abbas	45	45	2 October 1983	
2000	Babar Azam †	47	45	16 September 2018	
3000	Fakhar Zaman †	67	67	29 April 2023	
4000	Babar Azam †	84	82	29 March 2022	
5000	Babar Azam †	99	97	5 May 2023	
6000	Babar Azam †	126	123	14 February 2025	
7000	Saeed Anwar	197	194	4 February 2000	
8000	Saeed Anwar	221	218	13 April 2001	
9000	Mohammad Yousuf	258	245	11 April 2008	
10000	Inzamam-ul-Haq	322	299	19 September 2004	
11000	Inzamam-ul-Haq	349	324	12 December 2005	

==== Most runs against each opponent ====
Opposition	Runs	Batsman	Matches	Innings	Career Span	Ref
Afghanistan	298	Babar Azam†	6	6	2018–2023	
Afghanistan	298	Imam-ul-Haq†	6	6	2018–2023	
Australia	1,019	Javed Miandad	35	33	1979–1993	
Bangladesh	893	Mohammad Yousuf	18	16	2000–2008	
Canada	57	Sadiq Mohammad	1	1	1979–1979	
England	991	Javed Miandad	28	25	1977–1996	
Hong Kong	211	Younis Khan	2	2	2004–2008	
India	2,403	Inzamam-ul-Haq	67	64	1992–2006	
Ireland	217	Mohammad Hafeez	6	6	2007–2016	
Kenya	173	Younis Khan	3	3	2002–2011	
Namibia	63	Saleem Elahi	1	1	2003–2003	
Nepal	151	Babar Azam†	1	1	2023–2023	
Netherlands	227	Babar Azam†	4	4	2022–2023	
New Zealand	1,283	Inzamam-ul-Haq	45	42	1992–2004	
Scotland	164	Mohammad Yousuf	2	2	1999–2006	
South Africa	1,116	Mohammad Yousuf	34	34	1998–2010	
Sri Lanka	2,265	Inzamam-ul-Haq	63	58	1992–2006	
United Arab Emirates	93	Ahmed Shehzad	1	1	2015–2015	
West Indies	1,930	Javed Miandad	64	64	1975–1993	
Zimbabwe	1,033	Mohammad Yousuf	24	22	1998–2008	
Last updated: 7 October 2024

==== Most runs in each batting position ====
Batting position	Batsman	Innings	Runs	Average	Career Span	Ref
Opener	Saeed Anwar	220	8,156	39.98	1989–2003	
Number 3	Babar Azam†	116	5,811	57.53	2016–2025	
Number 4	Javed Miandad	160	5,678	43.34	1975–1996	
Number 5	Inzamam-ul-Haq	104	3,467	42.28	1991–2007	
Number 6	Umar Akmal	62	1,888	37.01	2009–2019	
Number 7	Abdul Razzaq	81	1,958	33.18	1996–2013	
Number 8	Wasim Akram	93	1,208	17.01	1985–2003	
Number 9	Wasim Akram	33	382	13.64	1985–2003	
Number 10	Waqar Younis	63	478 ♠	11.11	1989–2003	
Number 11	Aaqib Javed	34	116	9.66	1988–1998	
Last updated: 15 March 2026.

==== Highest individual score ====
The fourth ODI of the Sri Lanka's tour of India in 2014 saw Rohit Sharma score the highest Individual score. Fakhar Zaman holds the Pakistani record when he scored 210* against Zimbabwe in the fourth ODI of the 2018 series.

Rank	Runs	Player	Opposition	Venue	Date
1	210*	Fakhar Zaman†	Zimbabwe	Queens Sports Club, Bulawayo, Zimbabwe	20 July 2018
2	194	Saeed Anwar	India	M. A. Chidambaram Stadium, Chennai, India	21 May 1997
3	193	Fakhar Zaman†	South Africa	Wanderers Cricket Ground, Johannesburg, South Africa	4 April 2021
4	180*	Fakhar Zaman†	New Zealand	Rawalpindi Cricket Stadium, Rawalpindi, Pakistan	29 April 2023
5	160	Imran Nazir	Zimbabwe	Sabina Park, Kingston, Jamaica	21 March 2007 ‡
Last updated: 30 April 2023

==== Highest individual score – progression of record ====
Runs	Player	Opponent	Venue	Season
37	Sadiq Mohammad	New Zealand	AMI Stadium, Christchurch, New Zealand	1972–73
109	Majid Khan	England	Trent Bridge, Nottingham, England	1974
123	Zaheer Abbas	Sri Lanka	Gaddafi Stadium, Lahore, Pakistan	1981–82
124*	Ijaz Ahmed	Bangladesh	MA Aziz Stadium, Chittagong, Bangladesh	1988–89
126*	Shoaib Mohammad	New Zealand	Westpac Stadium, Wellington, New Zealand	1988–89
126	Saeed Anwar	Sri Lanka	Adelaide Oval, Adelaide, Australia	1989–90
131	Saeed Anwar	West Indies	Sharjah Cricket Stadium, Sharjah, United Arab Emirates	1993–94
137*	Inzamam-ul-Haq	New Zealand	Sharjah Cricket Stadium, Sharjah, United Arab Emirates	1994
194	Saeed Anwar	India	M. A. Chidambaram Stadium, Chennai, India	1997
210*	Fakhar Zaman	Zimbabwe	Queens Sports Club, Bulawayo, Zimbabwe	2018
Last updated: 1 July 2020

==== Highest score against each opponent ====
Opposition	Score	Player	Venue	Date	Ref
Afghanistan	102*	Umar Akmal	Fatullah Osmani Stadium, Fatullah, Bangladesh	27 February 2014	
Australia	130	Haris Sohail	Dubai International Cricket Stadium, Dubai, UAE	31 March 2019	
Bangladesh	136	Salman Butt	National Stadium, Karachi, Pakistan	19 April 2008	
Canada	57*	Sadiq Mohammad	Headingley, Leeds, England	9 June 1979 ‡	
England	158	Babar Azam	Edgbaston Cricket Ground, Birmingham, England	13 July 2021	
Hong Kong	144	Younis Khan	Sinhalese Sports Club Ground, Colombo, Sri Lanka	18 July 2004	
India	194	Saeed Anwar	M. A. Chidambaram Stadium, Chennai, India	21 May 1997	
Ireland	152	Sharjeel Khan	Malahide Cricket Club Ground, Dublin, Ireland	16 August 2016	
Kenya	87*	Younis Khan	Gymkhana Club Ground, Nairobi, Kenya	1 September 2002	
Namibia	63	Saleem Elahi	De Beers Diamond Oval, Kinberley, South Africa	16 February 2003 ‡	
Netherlands	109	Fakhar Zaman	Hazelaarweg, Rotterdam, Netherlands	16 August 2022	
Nepal	151	Babar Azam	Multan Cricket Stadium, Multan, Pakistan	30 August 2023	
New Zealand	180*	Fakhar Zaman	Rawalpindi Cricket Stadium, Rawalpindi, Pakistan	29 April 2023	
Scotland	83*	Mohammad Yousuf	Grange CC Club, Edinburgh, Scotland	27 June 2006	
Scotland	83*	Misbah-ul-Haq	Grange CC Club, Edinburgh, Scotland	17 May 2013	
South Africa	193	Fakhar Zaman	Wanderers Stadium, Johannesburg, South Africa	4 April 2021	
Sri Lanka	140*	Mohammad Hafeez	Sharjah Cricket Stadium, Sharjah, UAE	22 December 2013	
United Arab Emirates	93	Ahmed Shehzad	McLean Park, Napier, New Zealand	4 March 2015 ‡	
West Indies	131	Saeed Anwar	Sharjah Cricket Stadium, Sharjah, UAE	1 November 1993	
Zimbabwe	210*	Fakhar Zaman	Queens Sports Club, Bulawayo, Zimbabwe	20 July 2018	
Last updated: 30 August 2023.

==== Highest career average ====
A batsman's batting average is the total number of runs they have scored divided by the number of times they have been dismissed.

Rank	Average	Player	Innings	Runs	Not out	Period
1	53.72	Babar Azam†	137	6,501	16	2015–2025
2	47.62	Zaheer Abbas	60	2,572	6	1974–1985
3	47.04	Imam-ul-Haq†	74	3,152	7	2017–2025
4	45.42	Fakhar Zaman†	91	3,861	6	2017–2025
5	45.23	Salman Ali Agha†	42	1,538	8	2022–2026
Qualification: 20 innings. Last updated: 15 March 2026

==== Highest Average in each batting position ====
Batting position	Batsman	Innings	Runs	Average	Career Span	Ref
Opener	Imam-ul-Haq†	74	3,152	47.04	2017–2025	
Number 3	Babar Azam†	105	5,811	57.53	2016–2025	
Number 4	Misbah-ul-Haq	51	1,945	47.43	2002–2015	
Number 5	Misbah-ul-Haq	66	2,338	47.71	2002–2015	
Number 6	Younus Khan	29	1,013	42.20	2000–2015	
Number 7	Abdul Razzaq	81	1,958	33.18	1999–2011	
Number 8	Abdul Razzaq	52	1,066	29.61	1999–2011	
Number 9	Abdul Qadir	21	168	24.00	1983–1993	
Number 10	Waqar Younis	63	478	11.11	1989–2003	
Number 11	Aaqib Javed	34	116	9.66	1988–1998	
Last updated: 15 March 2026. Qualification: Min 20 innings batted at position

==== Most half-centuries ====
A half-century is a score of between 50 and 99 runs. Statistically, once a batsman's score reaches 100, it is no longer considered a half-century but a century.

Sachin Tendulkar of India has scored the most half-centuries in ODIs with 96. He is followed by the Sri Lanka's Kumar Sangakkara on 93, South Africa's Jacques Kallis on 86 and India's Rahul Dravid and Pakistan's Inzamam-ul-Haq on 83.

Rank	Half centuries	Player	Innings	Runs	Period
1	83	Inzamam-ul-Haq	375	11,701	1991–2007
2	64	Mohammad Yousuf	281	9,554	1998–2010
3	50	Javed Miandad	218	7,381	1975–1996
4	48	Younus Khan	255	7,249	2000–2015
5	47	Saleem Malik	256	7,170	1982–1999
Last updated: 1 July 2020

==== Most centuries ====
A century is a score of 100 or more runs in a single innings.17

Tendulkar has also scored the most centuries in ODIs with 49. Saeed Anwar and Babar Azam has the most centuries for Pakistan.

Rank	Centuries	Player	Innings	Runs	Period
1	20	Babar Azam†	137	6,501	2015–2025
1	20	Saeed Anwar	244	8,824	1989–2003
2	15	Mohammad Yousuf	281	9,554	1998–2010
3	11	Fakhar Zaman†	91	3,861	2017–2025
3	11	Mohammad Hafeez	216	6,614	2003–2019
Last updated: 15 March 2026

==== Most Sixes ====
Rank	Sixes	Player	Innings	Runs	Period
1	351	Shahid Afridi	369	8,064	1996–2015
2	144	Inzamam-ul-Haq	350	11,739	1991–2007
3	124	Abdul Razzaq	228	5,080	1996–2011
4	121	Wasim Akram	280	3,717	1984–2003
5	113	Shoaib Malik	258	7,534	1999–2019
Last updated: 15 March 2026

==== Most Fours ====
Rank	Fours	Player	Innings	Runs	Period
1	971	Inzamam-ul-Haq	350	11,739	1991–2007
2	938	Saeed Anwar	244	8,824	1989–2003
3	785	Mohammad Yousuf	273	9,720	1998–2010
4	729	Shahid Afridi	369	8,064	1996–2015
5	664	Mohammad Hafeez	216	6,614	2003–2019
Last updated: 9 January 2023

==== Highest strike rates ====
Andre Russell of West Indies holds the record for highest strike rate, with minimum 500 balls faced qualification, with 130.22. Shahid Afridi is the Pakistani with the highest strike rate.

Rank	Strike rate	Player	Runs	Balls Faced	Period
1	116.94	Shahid Afridi	8,064	6,864	1996–2015
2	113.40	Sharjeel Khan	812	716	2013–2017
3	110.29	Imad Wasim†	986	894	2015–2020
4	106.59	Iftikhar Ahmed†	614	576	2015–2023
5	100.00	Saim Ayub†	751	751	2024–2025
Qualification: 500 balls faced. Last updated: 16 March 2026

==== Highest strike rates in an inning ====
James Franklin of New Zealand's strike rate of 387.50 during his 31* off 8 balls against Canada during 2011 Cricket World Cup is the world record for highest strike rate in an innings. Shahid Afridi holds the top three positions for a Pakistan player in this list.

Rank	Strike rate	Player	Runs	Balls Faced	Opposition	Venue	Date
1	305.55	Shahid Afridi	55*	18	Netherlands	Sinhalese Sports Club Ground, Colombo, Sri Lanka	21 September 2002
2	290.90	Hasan Ali	32*	11	South Africa	Centurion Park, Centurion, South Africa	7 April 2021
3	290.00	Shahid Afridi	29	10	Australia	WACA, Perth, Australia	29 January 2010
4	283.33	Shahid Afridi	34	12	Sri Lanka	Sharjah Cricket Stadium, Sharjah, United Arab Emirates	18 December 2013
5	277.77	Imran Khan	25*	9	West Indies	Sharjah Cricket Stadium, Sharjah, United Arab Emirates	15 November 1985
Last updated: 7 April 2021

==== Most runs in a calendar year ====
Tendulkar holds the record for most runs scored in a calendar year with 1894 runs scored in 1998. Saeed Anwar scored 1595 runs in 1996, the most for a Pakistan batsmen in a year.

Rank	Runs	Player	Matches	Innings	Year
1	1,595	Saeed Anwar	36	36	1996
2	1,373	Misbah-ul-Haq	34	32	2013
3	1,362	Mohammad Yousuf	32	30	2002
4	1,301	Mohammad Hafeez	33	33	2013
5	1,281	Ijaz Ahmed	38	36	1996
Last updated: 1 July 2020

==== Most runs in a series ====
The 1980–81 Benson & Hedges World Series Cup in Australia saw Greg Chappell set the record for the most runs scored in a single series scoring 685 runs. He is followed by Sachin Tendulkar with 673 runs scored in the 2003 Cricket World Cup.Fakhar Zaman has scored the most runs in a series for a Pakistan batsmen, when he scored 515 runs in the Pakistan's tour of Zimbabwe in 2018.

Rank	Runs	Player	Matches	Innings	Series
1	515	Fakhar Zaman	5	5	Pakistan in of Zimbabwe in 2018
2	474	Babar Azam†	8	8	2019 Cricket World Cup
3	451	Salman Butt	5	5	Bangladesh in Pakistan in 2008
4	448	Mohammad Hafeez	5	5	Sri Lanka v Pakistan in the UAE in 2013-14
5	437	Javed Miandad	9	9	1992 Cricket World Cup
Last updated: 1 July 2020

==== Most ducks ====
A duck refers to a batsman being dismissed without scoring a run. Sanath Jayasuriya has scored the equal highest number of ducks in ODIs with 34 such knocks. Pakistan's Shahid Afridi with 30 ducks is second on the all-time list (he has 29 ducks for Pakistan and 1 for Asia XI).

Rank	Ducks	Player	Matches	Innings	Period
1	29	Shahid Afridi	393	364	1996–2015
2	28	Wasim Akram	356	280	1984–2003
3	22	Younus Khan	265	255	2000–2015
4	20	Inzamam-ul-Haq	375	348	1991–2007
5	19	Saleem Malik	283	256	1982–1999
5	19	Mohammad Hafeez	218	216	2003–2019
Last updated: 1 July 2020

=== Bowling records ===
==== Most career wickets ====
A bowler takes the wicket of a batsman when the form of dismissal is bowled, caught, leg before wicket, stumped or hit wicket. If the batsman is dismissed by run out, obstructing the field, handling the ball, hitting the ball twice or timed out the bowler does not receive credit.

Wasim Akram, former captain of Pakistan national cricket team and widely acknowledged as one of the greatest bowlers of all time and "Sultan of Swing", is the second highest wicket-taker in ODIs behind Sri Lankan wizard Muttiah Muralitharan.

Rank	Wickets	Player	Matches	Innings	Runs	Period
1	502	Wasim Akram	356	351	11,812	1984–2003
2	416	Waqar Younis	262	258	9,919	1989–2003
3	393	Shahid Afridi	393	369	13,572	1996–2015
4	288	Saqlain Mushtaq	169	165	6,275	1995–2003
5	268	Abdul Razzaq	261	250	8,452	1996–2011
6	241	Shoaib Akhtar	158	157	5,953	1998–2011
7	184	Saeed Ajmal	113	112	4,182	2008–2015
8	182	Imran Khan	175	153	4,844	1974–1992
9	182	Aaqib Javed	163	159	5,721	1988–1998
10	179	Umar Gul	130	128	5,253	2003–2016
Last updated: 11 January 2023

==== Fastest wicket taker ====
Wickets	Bowler	Match	Record Date	Reference
50	Hasan Ali	24	18 October 2017	
100	Saqlain Mushtaq	53	12 May 1997	
150	Saqlain Mushtaq	78	16 January 1998	
200	Saqlain Mushtaq	104 ♠	5 June 1999 ‡	
250	Saqlain Mushtaq	138 ♠	20 April 2001	
300	Waqar Younis	171	28 March 2000	
350	Waqar Younis	218	31 October 2001	
400	Waqar Younis	252 ♠	8 December 2002	
450	Wasim Akram	327	12 April 2002	
500	Wasim Akram	354	25 February 2002 ‡	
Last updated: 1 July 2020

==== Most wickets against each opponent ====
Opponent	Wickets	Player	Matches	Innings	Average	Period	Ref
Afghanistan	13	Shaheen Afridi†	6	6	18.53	2018–2023	
Australia	67	Wasim Akram	49	49	27.43	1985–2003	
Bangladesh	32	Shahid Afridi	21	21	22.06	1997–2014	
Canada	5	Shahid Afridi	1	1	4.60	2011–2011	
England	34	Shoaib Akhtar	18	18	24.17	1999–2010	
England	34	Shahid Afridi	26	26	27.52	1997–2012	
Hong Kong	4	Shoaib Malik	3	3	16.75	2004–2018	
India	60	Wasim Akram	48	47	25.15	1985–2003	
Ireland	10	Junaid Khan	4	4	17.8	2011–2013	
Kenya	12	Shahid Afridi	5	4	7.66	1996–2011	
Namibia	5	Wasim Akram	1	1	5.60	2003–2003	
Netherlands	10	Naseem Shah†	3	3	11.10	2022–2022	
Nepal	4	Shadab Khan†	1	1	6.75	2023–2023	
New Zealand	79	Waqar Younis	37	37	15.84	1990–2002	
Scotland	3	Shoaib Akhtar	1	1	3.66	1999–1999	
Scotland	3	Junaid Khan	1	1	6.33	2013–2013	
Scotland	3	Wasim Akram	1	1	7.66	1999–1999	
Scotland	3	Saeed Ajmal	1	1	8.33	2013–2013	
Scotland	3	Shoaib Malik	1	1	11.66	2006–2006	
Scotland	3	Abdul Razzaq	2	2	26.33	1999–2006	
South Africa	58	Waqar Younis	32	32	24.89	1993–2002	
Sri Lanka	92	Wasim Akram	59	58	20.96	1986–2002	
United Arab Emirates	5	Wasim Akram	2	2	8.80	1994–1996	
West Indies	89	Wasim Akram	64	64	25.57	1985–2002	
Zimbabwe	34	Shahid Afridi	31	31	33.29	1996–2015	
Last updated: 8 November 2024

==== Best figures in an innings ====
Bowling figures refers to the number of the wickets a bowler has taken and the number of runs conceded. Sri Lanka's Chaminda Vaas holds the world record for best figures in an innings when he took 8/19 against Zimbabwe in December 2001 at Colombo (SSC). Shahid Afridi holds the Pakistani record for best bowling figures.

Rank	Figures	Player	Opposition	Venue	Date
1	7/12	Shahid Afridi	West Indies	Providence Stadium, Providence, Guyana	14 July 2013
2	7/36	Waqar Younis	England	Headingley, Leeds, England	17 June 2001
3	7/37	Aaqib Javed	India	Sharjah Cricket Stadium, Sharjah, United Arab Emirates	25 October 1991
4	6/14	Imran Khan	India	Sharjah Cricket Stadium, Sharjah, United Arab Emirates	22 March 1985
5	6/16	Shoaib Akhtar	New Zealand	National Stadium, Karachi, Pakistan	21 April 2002
Last updated: 1 July 2020

==== Best figures in an innings – progression of record ====
Figures	Player	Opposition	Venue	Date
4/46	Sarfraz Nawaz	New Zealand	AMI Stadium, Christchurch, New Zealand	1972–73
4/44	Sarfraz Nawaz	West Indies	Edgbaston, Birmingham, England	1975 ‡
4/37	Sarfraz Nawaz	West Indies	Melbourne Cricket Ground, Melbourne, Australia	1981–82
4/34	Sikander Bakht	Australia	Melbourne Cricket Ground, Melbourne, Australia	1981–82
4/25	Wasim Raja	West Indies	Adelaide Oval, Adelaide, Australia	1981–82
4/21	Abdul Qadir	New Zealand	Edgbaston, Birmingham, England	1983 ‡
5/44	Abdul Qadir	Sri Lanka	Headingley, Leeds, England	1983 ‡
5/21	Wasim Akram	Australia	Melbourne Cricket Ground, Melbourne, Australia	1984–85
6/14	Imran Khan	India	Sharjah Cricket Stadium, Sharjah, United Arab Emirates	1984–85
7/37	Aaqib Javed	India	Sharjah Cricket Stadium, Sharjah, United Arab Emirates	1991–92
7/36	Waqar Younis	England	Headingley, Leeds, England	2001
7/12	Shahid Afridi	West Indies	Providence Stadium, Providence, Guyana	2013
Last updated: 1 July 2020

==== Best Bowling Figure against each opponent ====
Opposition	Figures	Player	Venue	Date	Ref
Afghanistan	5/18	Haris Rauf	Mahinda Rajapaksa International Cricket Stadium, Hambantota, Sri Lanka	22 August 2023	
Australia	6/38	Shahid Afridi	Dubai International Cricket Stadium, Dubai, UAE	22 April 2009	
Bangladesh	6/35	Abdul Razzaq	Bangabandhu National Stadium, Dhaka, Bangladesh	25 January 2002	
Bangladesh	6/35	Shaheen Afridi	Lord's, London, England	5 July 2019 ‡	
Canada	5/23	Shahid Afridi	R Premadasa Stadium, Colombo, Sri Lanka	3 March 2011 ‡	
England	7/36	Waqar Younis	Headingley, Leeds, England	17 June 2001	
Hong Kong	4/19	Shoaib Malik	Sinhalese Sports Club Ground, Colombo, Sri Lanka	18 July 2004	
India	7/37	Aaqib Javed	Sharjah Cricket Stadium, Sharjah, UAE	25 October 1991	
Ireland	5/14	Imad Wasim	Malahide Cricket Club Ground, Dublin, Ireland	18 August 2016	
Kenya	5/11	Shahid Afridi	Edgbaston, Birmingham, England	14 September 2004	
Namibia	5/28	Wasim Akram	De Beers Diamond Oval, Kinberley, South Africa	16 February 2003 ‡	
Netherlands	5/33	Naseem Shah	Hazelaarweg, Rotterdam, Netherlands	21 August 2022	
Nepal	4/27	Shadab Khan	Multan Cricket Stadium, Multan, Pakistan	30 August 2023	
New Zealand	6/16	Shoaib Akhtar	National Stadium, Karachi, Pakistan	21 April 2002	
Scotland	3/11	Shoaib Akhtar	Riverside Ground, Chester-le-Street, England	20 May 1999 ‡	
South Africa	5/16	Wasim Akram	Buffalo Park, East London, South Africa	15 February 1993	
Sri Lanka	6/26	Waqar Younis	Sharjah Cricket Stadium, Sharjah, UAE	29 April 1990	
United Arab Emirates	3/16	Mushtaq Ahmed	Jinnah Stadium, Gujranwala, Pakistan	24 February 1996 ‡	
West Indies	7/12	Shahid Afridi	Providence Stadium, Providence, Guyana	14 July 2013	
Zimbabwe	6/26	Yasir Shah	Harare Sports Club, Harare, Zimbabwe	1 October 2015	
Last updated: 30 August 2023

==== Best career average ====
A bowler's bowling average is the total number of runs they have conceded divided by the number of wickets they have taken. Afghanistan's Rashid Khan holds the record for the best career average in ODIs with 18.54. Joel Garner, West Indian cricketer, and a member of the highly regarded late 1970s and early 1980s West Indies cricket teams, is second behind Rashid with an overall career average of 18.84 runs per wicket. Saqlain Mushtaq is the highest ranked Pakistani when the qualification of 2000 balls bowled is followed.

Rank	Average	Player	Wickets	Runs	Balls	Period
1	21.78	Saqlain Mushtaq	288	6,275	8,770	1995–2003
2	22.72	Saeed Ajmal	184	4,182	6,000	2008–2015
3	23.22	Sarfraz Nawaz	63	1,463	2,412	1973–1984
4	23.52	Wasim Akram	502	11,812	18,186	1984–2003
5	23.84	Waqar Younis	416	9,919	12,698	1989–2003
Qualification: 2,000 balls. Last updated: 1 July 2020

==== Best career economy rate ====
A bowler's economy rate is the total number of runs they have conceded divided by the number of overs they have bowled. West Indies' Joel Garner, holds the ODI record for the best career economy rate with 3.09. Pakistan's sarfraz Nawaz, with a rate of 3.63 runs per over conceded over his 45-match ODI career, is the highest Pakistani on the list.

Rank	Economy rate	Player	Wickets	Runs	Balls	Period
1	3.63	Sarfraz Nawaz	63	1,463	2,412	1973–1984
2	3.71	Akram Raza	38	1,611	2,601	1989–1995
3	3.89	Imran Khan	182	4,844	7,461	1974–1992
3	3.89	Wasim Akram	502	11,812	18,186	1984–2003
5	4.06	Abdul Qadir	132	3,454	5,100	1983–1993
Qualification: 2,000 balls. Last updated: 1 July 2020

==== Best career strike rate ====
A bowler's strike rate is the total number of balls they have bowled divided by the number of wickets they have taken. The top bowler with the best ODI career strike rate is South Africa's Lungi Ngidi with strike rate of 23.2 balls per wicket. Saqlain Mushtaq is the highest ranked Pakistani in this list.

Rank	Strike rate	Player	Wickets	Runs	Balls	Period
1	30.4	Saqlain Mushtaq	288	6,275	8,770	1995–2003
2	30.5	Waqar Younis	416	9,919	12,698	1989–2003
3	31.1	Shoaib Akhtar	241	5,953	7,509	1998–2011
4	31.5	Rana Naved-ul-Hasan	110	3,221	3,466	2003–2010
5	31.6	Hasan Ali	91	2,763	2,882	2016–2022
Qualification: 2,000 balls. Last updated: 13 July 2021

==== Most four-wickets (& over) hauls in an innings ====
Waqar Younis has taken the most four-wickets (or over) among all the bowlers.

Rank	Four-wicket hauls	Player	Matches	Balls	Wickets	Period
1	27 ♠	Waqar Younis	262	12,698	416	1989–2003
2	23	Wasim Akram	356	18,186	502	1984–2003
3	17	Saqlain Mushtaq	169	8,770	288	1995–2003
4	13	Shahid Afridi	393	17,599	393	1996–2015
5	11	Abdul Razzaq	261	10,851	268	1996–2011
Last updated: 1 July 2020

==== Most five-wicket hauls in a match ====
A five-wicket haul refers to a bowler taking five wickets in a single innings. Waqar Younis with 13 such hauls has the most hauls among all the bowlers.

Rank	Five-wicket hauls	Player	Matches	Balls	Wickets	Period
1	13 ♠	Waqar Younis	262	12,698	416	1989–2003
2	9	Shahid Afridi	393	17,599	393	1996–2015
3	6	Wasim Akram	356	18,186	502	1984–2003
3	6	Saqlain Mushtaq	169	8,770	288	1995–2003
5	4	Aaqib Javed	163	8,012	182	1995–2007
5	4	Shoaib Akhtar	158	7,509	241	1998–2011
5	4	Hasan Ali	60	2,882	91	2016–2022
Last updated: 9 January 2023

==== Best economy rates in an inning ====
The best economy rate in an inning, when a minimum of 30 balls are delivered by the player, is West Indies player Phil Simmons economy of 0.30 during his spell of 3 runs for 4 wickets in 10 overs against Pakistan at Sydney Cricket Ground in the 1991-92 Australian Tri-Series. Wasim Akram holds the Pakistani record during his spell in 1986-87 Champions Trophy against India at Sharjah, UAE.

Rank	Economy	Player	Overs	Runs	Wickets	Opposition	Venue	Date
1	0.54	Wasim Akram	7.2	4	2	India	Sharjah Cricket Stadium, Sharjah, United Arab Emirates	5 December 1986
2	0.62	Arshad Khan	8	5	1	Bangladesh	Bangabandhu National Stadium, Dhaka, Bangladesh	2 June 2000
3	0.85	Saeed Ajmal	7	6	2	Bangladesh	Zohur Ahmed Chowdhury Stadium, Chittagong, Pakistan	6 December 2011
4	0.90	Abdul Qadir	10	9	4	New Zealand	Sharjah Cricket Stadium, Sharjah, United Arab Emirates	15 April 1986
5	1.00	Wasim Raja	7	7	1	Sri Lanka	Trent Bridge, Nottingham, England	14 June 1975 ‡
5	1.00	Majid Khan	11	11	1	Canada	Headingley, Leeds, England	9 June 1979 ‡
Qualification: 30 balls bowled. Last updated: 1 July 2020

==== Best strike rates in an inning ====
The best strike rate in an inning, when a minimum of 4 wickets are taken by the player, is shared by Sunil Dhaniram of Canada, Paul Collingwood of England and Virender Sehwag of India when they achieved a strike rate of 4.2 balls pr wicket. Mudassar Nazar during his spell of 4/27 achieved the best strike rate for a Pakistani bowler.

Rank	Strike rate	Player	Wickets	Runs	Balls	Opposition	Venue	Date
1	6.0	Mudassar Nazar	4	27	24	New Zealand	Iqbal Stadium, Faisalabad, Pakistan	23 November 1984
2	6.8	Imad Wasim	5	14	34	Ireland	Malahide Cricket Club Ground, Dublin, Ireland	18 August 2016
3	7.2	Waqar Younis	5	16	36	New Zealand	Jinnah Stadium, Sialkot, Pakistan	6 November 1990
3	7.2	Shahid Afridi	5	11	36	Kenya	Edgbaston, Birmingham, England	14 September 2004
5	7.4	Wasim Akram	5	16	37	South Africa	Buffalo Park, East London, South Africa	15 February 1993
Last updated: 1 July 2020

==== Worst figures in an innings ====
The worst figures in an ODI came in the 5th One Day International between South Africa at home to Australia in 2006. Australia's Mick Lewis returned figures of 0/113 from his 10 overs in the second innings of the match. The worst figures by a Pakistani is 0/110 that came off the bowling of Wahab Riaz in the third ODI against England at Nottingham.

Rank	Figures	Player	Overs	Opposition	Venue	Date
1	0/110	Wahab Riaz	10	England	Trent Bridge, Nottingham, England	30 August 2016
2	0/93	Bilawal Bhatti	10	New Zealand	McLean Park, Napier, New Zealand	3 February 2015
3	0/90	Shaheen Afridi	10	New Zealand	M.Chinnaswamy Stadium, Bengaluru, India	4 November 2023
4	0/87	Wahab Riaz	8.4	India	Edgbaston, Birmingham, England	4 June 2017
5	0/83	Abdul Razzaq	9	India	National Stadium, Karachi, Pakistan	13 March 2004
5	0/83	Shaheen Afridi†	10	England	Bristol County Ground, Bristol, England	14 May 2019
Last updated: 1 July 2020

==== Most runs conceded in a match ====
Mick Lewis also holds the dubious distinction of most runs conceded in an ODI during the aforementioned match. Riaz holds the most runs conceded distinction for Pakistan.

Rank	Figures	Player	Overs	Opposition	Venue	Date
1	0/110	Wahab Riaz	10	England	Trent Bridge, Nottingham, England	30 August 2016
2	2/100	Hasan Ali	9	Australia	Adelaide Oval, Adelaide, Australia	26 January 2017
3	2/93	Wahab Riaz	10	South Africa	New Wanderers Stadium, Johannesburg, South Africa	17 March 2013
3	0/93	Bilawal Bhatti	10	New Zealand	McLean Park, Napier, New Zealand	3 February 2015
5	2/92	Rana Naved-ul-Hasan	8	South Africa	Centurion Park, Centurion, South Africa	4 February 2007
Last updated:1 July 2020

==== Most wickets in a calendar year ====
Pakistan's Saqlain Mushtaq holds the record for most wickets taken in a year when he took 69 wickets in 1997 in 36 ODIs.

Rank	Wickets	Player	Matches	Year
1	69	Saqlain Mushtaq	36	1997
2	65	Saqlain Mushtaq	33	1996
3	62	Saeed Ajmal	33	2013
4	61	Abdul Razzaq	38	2000
5	60	Waqar Younis	35	1996
Last updated: 1 July 2020

==== Most wickets in a series ====
1998–99 Carlton and United Series involving Australia, England and Sri Lanka and the 2019 Cricket World Cup saw the records set for the most wickets taken by a bowler in an ODI series when Australian pacemen Glenn McGrath and Mitchell Starc achieved a total of 27 wickets during the series, respectively. Waqar Younis in the 1994-95 Mandela Trophy and Shahid Afridi at 2011 Cricket World Cup are joint 16th with 21 wickets taken a series.

Rank	Wickets	Player	Matches	Series
1	21	Waqar Younis	8	1994-95 Mandela Trophy
1	21	Shahid Afridi	8	2011 Cricket World Cup
3	18	Wasim Akram	10	1992 Cricket World Cup
4	17	Imran Khan	7	1987 Cricket World Cup
4	17	Waqar Younis	4	1990 Austral-Asia Cup
4	17	Saqlain Mushtaq	10	1996-97 Carlton and United Series
4	17	Saqlain Mushtaq	10	1999 Cricket World Cup
4	17	Waqar Younis	6	2001 NatWest Series
4	17	Mohammad Amir	8	2019 Cricket World Cup
Last updated: 1 July 2020

==== Hat-trick ====
In cricket, a hat-trick occurs when a bowler takes three wickets with consecutive deliveries. The deliveries may be interrupted by an over bowled by another bowler from the other end of the pitch or the other team's innings, but must be three consecutive deliveries by the individual bowler in the same match. Only wickets attributed to the bowler count towards a hat-trick; run outs do not count. In ODIs history there have been just 49 hat-tricks, the first achieved by Jalal-ud-Din for Pakistan against Australia in 1982.

No.	Bowler	Against	Dismissals	Venue	Date	Ref.
1	Jalal-ud-Din	Australia	• Rod Marsh (b) • Bruce Yardley (c †Wasim Bari) • Geoff Lawson (b)	(Pakistan) Niaz Stadium, Hyderabad	20 September 1982	
2	Wasim Akram	West Indies	• Jeff Dujon (b) • Malcolm Marshall (b) • Curtly Ambrose (b)	(United Arab Emirates) Sharjah Stadium, Sharjah	14 October 1989	
3	Wasim Akram	Australia	• Merv Hughes (b) • Carl Rackemann (b) • Terry Alderman (b)	(United Arab Emirates) Sharjah Stadium, Sharjah	4 May 1990	
4	Aaqib Javed	India	• Ravi Shastri (lbw) • Mohammad Azharuddin (lbw) • Sachin Tendulkar (lbw)	(United Arab Emirates) Sharjah Stadium, Sharjah	25 October 1991	
5	Waqar Younis	New Zealand	• Chris Harris (b) • Chris Pringle (b) • Richard de Groen (b)	(South Africa) Buffalo Park, East London	19 December 1994	
6	Saqlain Mushtaq	Zimbabwe	• Grant Flower (c †Moin Khan) • John Rennie (c †Moin Khan) • Andy Whittall (c Saleem Malik)	(Pakistan) Arbab Niaz Stadium, Peshawar	3 November 1996	
7	Saqlain Mushtaq	Zimbabwe	• Henry Olonga (st †Moin Khan) • Adam Huckle (st †Moin Khan) • Pommie Mbangwa (lbw)	(England) The Oval, London	11 June 1999 ‡	
8	Mohammad Sami	West Indies	• Ridley Jacobs (lbw) • Corey Collymore (b) • Cameron Cuffy (b)	(United Arab Emirates) Sharjah Stadium, Sharjah	15 February 2002	

=== Wicket-keeping records ===
The wicket-keeper is a specialist fielder who stands behind the stumps being guarded by the batsman on strike and is the only member of the fielding side allowed to wear gloves and leg pads.

==== Most career dismissals ====
A wicket-keeper can be credited with the dismissal of a batsman in two ways, caught or stumped. A fair catch is taken when the ball is caught fully within the field of play without it bouncing after the ball has touched the striker's bat or glove holding the bat, Laws 5.6.2.2 and 5.6.2.3 state that the hand or the glove holding the bat shall be regarded as the ball striking or touching the bat while a stumping occurs when the wicket-keeper puts down the wicket while the batsman is out of his ground and not attempting a run. Pakistan's Moin Khan is fifth in taking most dismissals in ODIs as a designated wicket-keeper with Sri Lanka's Kumar Sangakkara and Australian Adam Gilchrist heading the list.

Rank	Dismissals	Player	Matches	Innings	Period
1	287	Moin Khan	219	209	1990–2004
2	220	Rashid Latif	166	164	1992–2003
3	187	Kamran Akmal	157	151	2002–2017
4	143	Sarfaraz Ahmed†	117	115	2007–2021
5	103	Saleem Yousuf	86	86	1982–1990
Last updated: 7 April 2021

==== Most career catches ====
Moin Khan is sixth in taking most catches in ODIs as a designated wicket-keeper.

Rank	Catches	Player	Matches	Innings	Period
1	214	Moin Khan	219	209	1990–2004
2	182	Rashid Latif	166	164	1992–2003
3	156	Kamran Akmal	157	151	2002–2017
4	119	Sarfaraz Ahmed†	117	115	2007–2021
5	81	Saleem Yousuf	86	86	1982–1990
Last updated: 7 April 2021

==== Most career stumpings ====
Moin Khan is fourth in making stumpings in ODIs as a designated wicket-keeper.

Rank	Stumpings	Player	Matches	Innings	Period
1	73	Moin Khan	219	209	1990–2004
2	38	Rashid Latif	166	164	1992–2003
3	31	Kamran Akmal	157	151	2002–2017
4	24	Sarfaraz Ahmed†	117	115	2007–2021
5	22	Saleem Yousuf	86	86	1982–1990
Last updated: 7 April 2021

==== Most dismissals in an innings ====
Ten wicket-keepers on 15 occasions have taken six dismissals in a single innings in an ODI. Adam Gilchrist of Australia alone has done it six times. Sarfaraz Ahmed is the only Pakistani wicket keeper to have achieved this.

The feat of taking 5 dismissals in an innings has been achieved by 49 wicket-keepers on 87 occasions including 2 Pakistanis.

Rank	Dismissals	Player	Opposition	Venue	Date
1	6	Sarfaraz Ahmed	South Africa	Eden Park, Auckland, NZ	7 March 2015 ‡
2	5	Moin Khan	Zimbabwe	Harare Sports Club, Harare, Zimbabwe	26 February 1995
2	5	Rashid Latif	New Zealand	Gaddafi Stadium, Lahore, Pakistan	6 March 1996 ‡
2	5	Moin Khan	Australia	Melbourne Cricket Ground, Melbourne, Australia	23 January 2000
2	5	Rashid Latif	Sri Lanka	Rangiri Dambulla International Stadium, Dambulla, Sri Lanka	18 May 2003
2	5	Kamran Akmal	West Indies	The Oval, London, England	7 June 2013
2	5	Umar Akmal	Zimbabwe	Brisbane Cricket Ground, Brisbane, Australia	1 March 2015 ‡
Last updated: 1 July 2020

==== Most dismissals in a series ====
Gilchrist also holds the ODIs record for the most dismissals taken by a wicket-keeper in a series. He made 27 dismissals during the 1998–99 Carlton & United Series. Pakistani record is held by Moin Khan when he made 19 dismissals during the 1999-00 Carlton & United Series.

Rank	Dismissals	Player	Matches	Innings	Series
1	19	Moin Khan	10	10	1999-00 Carlton & United Series
2	16	Moin Khan	10	10	1999 Cricket World Cup
3	14	Moin Khan	10	10	1992 Cricket World Cup
3	14	Moin Khan	5	5	Coca-Cola Champions Trophy 1999
3	14	Sarfaraz Ahmed	8	8	2019 Cricket World Cup
Last updated: 1 July 2020

=== Fielding records ===
==== Most career catches ====
Caught is one of the nine methods a batsman can be dismissed in cricket. (Note: In 2017, The Laws of Cricket were amended, reducing the methods of dismissals from ten to nine, with handled the ball now covered as part of obstructing the field.) The majority of catches are caught in the slips, located behind the batsman, next to the wicket-keeper, on the off side of the field. Most slip fielders are top order batsmen.

Sri Lanka's Mahela Jayawardene holds the record for the most catches in ODIs by a non-wicket-keeper with 218, followed by Ricky Ponting of Australia on 160 and Indian Mohammad Azharuddin with 156.Younus Khan is the leading catcher for Pakistan.

Rank	Catches	Player	Matches	Period
1	130	Younus Khan	265	2000–2015
2	127	Shahid Afridi	393	1996–2015
3	113	Inzamam-ul-Haq	375	1991–2003
4	98	Shoaib Malik	287	1999–2019
5	90	Ijaz Ahmed	250	1986–2000
Last updated: 1 July 2020

==== Most catches in an innings ====
South Africa's Jonty Rhodes is the only fielder to have taken five catches in an innings.

The feat of taking 4 catches in an innings has been achieved by 42 fielders on 44 occasions including four Pakistani fielders on five occasions.

Rank	Dismissals	Player	Opposition	Venue	Date
1	4	Saleem Malik	New Zealand	Jinnah Stadium, Sialkot, Pakistan	2 December 1984
1	4	Younus Khan	Zimbabwe	Harare Sports Club, Harare, Zimbabwe	1 December 2002
1	4	Younus Khan	India	Keenan Stadium, Jamshedpur, India	9 April 2005
1	4	Misbah-ul-Haq	Sri Lanka	Ranasinghe Premadasa Stadium, Colombo, Sri Lanka	9 August 2009
1	4	Umar Akmal	Ireland	Adelaide Oval, Adelaide, Australia	15 March 2015 ‡
Last updated: 1 July 2020

==== Most catches in a series ====
The 2019 Cricket World Cup, which was won by England for the first time, saw the record set for the most catches taken by a non-wicket-keeper in an ODI series. Englishman batsman and captain of the England Test team Joe Root took 13 catches in the series as well as scored 556 runs. Wasim Raja, Saleem Malik and Younus Khan with 7 catches in the same series are the leading Pakistani's on this list.

Rank	Catches	Player	Matches	Innings	Series
1	7	Wasim Raja	10	10	1981-82 Benson & Hedges World Series
1	7	Saleem Malik	3	3	New Zealand in Pakistan in 1984
1	7	Younus Khan	4	4	Pakistan in India in 2005
4	6	Aamer Sohail	9	9	1996-97 Carlton and United Series
4	6	Wasim Akram	5	5	1998-99 Pepsi Cup
4	6	Inzamam-ul-Haq	10	10	1999 Cricket World Cup
4	6	Misbah-ul-Haq	3	3	Pakistan in Sri Lanka in 2009
4	6	Umar Akmal	6	6	Pakistan in New Zealand in 2011
4	6	Mohammad Rizwan	5	5	Pakistan in Sri Lanka in 2015
Last updated: 1 July 2020

=== All-round Records ===
==== 1000 runs and 100 wickets ====
A total of 64 players have achieved the double of 1000 runs and 100 wickets in their ODI career.

Rank	Player	Average Difference	Period	Matches	Runs	Bat Avg	Wickets	Bowl Avg
1	Imran Khan	6.79	1974–1992	175	3709	33.41	182	26.61
2	Abdul Razzaq	-1.59	1996–2011	261	5031	29.94	268	31.53
3	Shoaib Malik	-4.63	1999–2019	287	7534	34.55	158	39.18
4	Mudassar Nazar	-5.65	1977–1989	122	2653	25.26	111	30.91
5	Mohammad Hafeez	-5.94	2003–2019	218	6614	32.9	139	38.84
6	Wasim Akram	-7.00	1984–2003	356	3717	16.52	502	23.52
7	Shahid Afridi	-10.71	1996–2015	393	8027	23.81	393	34.53
8	Azhar Mahmood	-21.02	1996–2007	143	1521	18.1	123	39.13
Last updated: 1 July 2020

==== 250 runs and 5 wickets in a series ====
A total of 50 players on 103 occasions have achieved the double of 250 runs and 5 wickets in a series.

Player	Matches	Runs	Wickets	Series
Mudassar Nazar	9	285	12	1981-82 Benson & Hedges World Series
Imran Khan	7	252	6	MRF World Series
Imran Khan	10	283	8	1989-90 Benson & Hedges World Series
Aamer Sohail	8	432	6	Mandela Trophy
Shoaib Malik	5	316	9	2004 Asia Cup
Shoaib Malik	5	260	7	Paktel Cup
Mohammad Hafeez	5	267	6	Pakistan in West Indies in 2011
Mohammad Hafeez	5	273	6	Pakistan in Sri Lanka in 2015
Last updated: 1 July 2020

=== Other records ===
==== Most career matches ====
India's Sachin Tendulkar holds the record for the most ODI matches played with 463, with former captains Mahela Jayawardene and Sanath Jayasuriya being second and third having represented Sri Lanka on 443 and 441 occasions, respectively. Shahid Afridi is the most experienced Pakistan players having represented the team on 393 occasions.

Rank	Matches	Player	Period
1	393	Shahid Afridi	1996–2015
2	375	Inzamam-ul-Haq	1991–2007
3	356	Wasim Akram	1984–2003
4	287	Shoaib Malik	1999–2019
5	283	Saleem Malik	1982–1999
Last updated: 1 July 2020

==== Most consecutive career matches ====
Tendulkar also holds the record for the most consecutive ODI matches played with 185. He broke Richie Richardson's long standing record of 132 matches.

Rank	Matches	Player	Period
1	111	Mohammad Yousuf	2002–2006
2	91	Shoaib Malik	2003–2006
3	88	Mohammad Hafeez	2010–2013
3	88	Misbah-ul-Haq	2011–2014
5	76	Moin Khan	1998–2000
Last updated: 3 June 2018

==== Most matches as captain ====
Ricky Ponting, who led the Australian cricket team from 2002 to 2012, holds the record for the most matches played as captain in ODIs with 230 (including 1 as captain of ICC World XI team). 1992 Cricket World Cup winning Pakistan skipper Imran Khan has led Pakistan in 139 matches, the most for any player from his country.

Rank	Player	Matches	Won	Lost	Tied	NR	Win %	Period
1	Imran Khan	139	75	59	1	4	55.92	1982–1992
2	Wasim Akram	109	66	41	2	0	61.46	1993–2000
3	Inzamam-ul-Haq	87	51	33	0	3	60.71	2002–2007
3	Misbah-ul-Haq	87	45	39	2	1	53.48	2008–2015
5	Javed Miandad	62	26	33	1	2	44.16	1980–1993
5	Waqar Younis	62	37	23	0	2	61.66	1993–2003
Last updated: 1 July 2020

==== Youngest players on Debut ====
The youngest player to play in an ODI match is claimed to be Hasan Raza at the age of 14 years and 233 days. Making his debut for Pakistan against Zimbabwe on 30 October 1996, there is some doubt as to the validity of Raza's age at the time.

Rank	Age	Player	Opposition	Venue	Date
1	14 years and 233 days ♠	Hasan Raza	Zimbabwe	Ayub National Stadium, Quetta, Pakistan	30 October 1996
2	16 years and 127 days	Aaqib Javed	West Indies	Adelaide Oval, Adelaide, Australia	10 December 1988
3	16 years and 215 days	Shahid Afridi	Kenya	Aga Khan Sports Club Ground, Nairobi, Kenya	2 October 1996
4	16 years and 335 days	Abdul Razzaq	Zimbabwe	Gaddafi Stadium, Lahore, Pakistan	1 November 1996
5	16 years and 361 days	Zahid Fazal	New Zealand	Jinnah Stadium, Sialkot, Pakistan	6 November 1990
Last updated: 1 July 2020

==== Oldest players on Debut ====
The Netherlands batsmen Nolan Clarke is the oldest player to appear in an ODI match. Playing in the 1996 Cricket World Cup against New Zealand in 1996 at Reliance Stadium in Vadodara, India he was aged 47 years and 240 days. Younis Ahmed is the oldest Pakistani ODI debutant when he played the second ODI during the 1987 tour of India at the Eden Gardens, Kolkata.

Rank	Age	Player	Opposition	Venue	Date
1	39 years and 121 days	Younis Ahmed	India	Eden Gardens, Kolkata, India	18 February 1987
2	35 years and 301 days	Zulfiqar Babar	Australia	Sharjah Cricket Stadium, Sharjah, United Arab Emirates	7 October 2014
3	34 years and 258 days	Mohammad Nazir	West Indies	National Stadium, Karachi, Pakistan	21 November 1980
4	33 years and 101 days	Saleem Pervez	West Indies	Gaddafi Stadium, Lahore, Pakistan	19 December 1980
5	33 years and 66 days	Iqbal Sikander	West Indies	Melbourne Cricket Ground, Melbourne, Australia	23 February 1992
Last updated: 1 July 2020

==== Oldest players ====
The Netherlands batsmen Nolan Clarke is the oldest player to appear in an ODI match. Playing in the 1996 Cricket World Cup against South Africa in 1996 at Rawalpindi Cricket Stadium in Rawalpindi, Pakistan he was aged 47 years and 257 days.

Rank	Age	Player	Opposition	Venue	Date
1	40 years and 296 days	Misbah-ul-Haq	Australia	Adelaide Oval, Adelaide, Australia	20 March 2015 ‡
2	39 years and 182 days	Imran Khan	England	Melbourne Cricket Ground, Melbourne, Australia	25 March 1992 ‡
3	39 years and 151 days	Younis Ahmed	India	Lal Bahadur Shastri Stadium, Hyderabad, India	20 March 1987
4	38 years and 271 days	Javed Miandad	India	M. Chinnaswamy Stadium, Bangalore, India	9 March 1996 ‡
5	38 years and 261 days	Mohammad Hafeez	Bangladesh	Lord's, London, England	9 March 2019 ‡
Last updated: 1 July 2020

== Partnership records ==
In cricket, two batsmen are always present at the crease batting together in a partnership. This partnership will continue until one of them is dismissed, retires or the innings comes to a close.

=== Highest partnerships by wicket ===
A wicket partnership describes the number of runs scored before each wicket falls. The first wicket partnership is between the opening batsmen and continues until the first wicket falls. The second wicket partnership then commences between the not out batsman and the number three batsman. This partnership continues until the second wicket falls. The third wicket partnership then commences between the not out batsman and the new batsman. This continues down to the tenth wicket partnership. When the tenth wicket has fallen, there is no batsman left to partner so the innings is closed.

Wicket	Runs	First batsman	Second batsman	Opposition	Venue	Date	Scorecard
1st wicket	304	Fakhar Zaman†	Imam-ul-Haq†	Zimbabwe	Queens Sports Club, Bulawayo, Zimbabwe	20 July 2018	Scorecard
2nd wicket	263	Inzamam-ul-Haq	Aamer Sohail	New Zealand	Sharjah Cricket Stadium, Sharjah, United Arab Emirates	20 April 1994	Scorecard
3rd wicket	230	Saeed Anwar	Ijaz Ahmed	India	Bangabandhu National Stadium, Dhaka, Bangladesh	18 January 1998	Scorecard
4th wicket	260	Agha Salman	Mohammad Rizwan	South Africa	National Stadium, Karachi, Pakistan	12 February 2025	Scorecard
5th wicket	214	Babar Azam†	Iftikhar Ahmed†	Nepal	Multan Cricket Stadium, Multan, Pakistan	30 August 2023	Scorecard
6th wicket	147	Fawad Alam	Sohaib Maqsood	Sri Lanka	Mahinda Rajapaksa International Stadium, Hambantota, Sri Lanka	23 August 2014	Scorecard
7th wicket	124	Mohammad Yousuf	Rashid Latif	Australia	SWALEC Stadium, Cardiff, England	9 June 2001	Scorecard
8th wicket	100	Fawad Alam	Sohail Tanvir	Hong Kong	National Stadium, Karachi, Pakistan	24 June 2008	Scorecard
9th wicket	90	Sarfaraz Ahmed†	Hasan Ali	South Africa	Sahara Stadium, Kingsmead, Durban, South Africa	22 January 2019	Scorecard
10th wicket	103	Mohammad Amir	Saeed Ajmal	New Zealand	Sheikh Zayed Cricket Stadium, Abu Dhabi, United Arab Emirates	9 November 2009	Scorecard
Last updated: 30 August 2023

=== Highest partnerships by runs ===
The highest ODI partnership by runs for any wicket is held by the West Indian pairing of Chris Gayle and Marlon Samuels who put together a second wicket partnership of 372 runs during the 2015 Cricket World Cup against Zimbabwe in February 2015. This broke the record of 331 runs set by Indian pair of Sachin Tendulkar and Rahul Dravid against New Zealand in 1999

Wicket	Runs	First batsman	Second batsman	Opposition	Venue	Date	Scorecard
1st wicket	304	Fakhar Zaman†	Imam-ul-Haq†	Zimbabwe	Queens Sports Club, Bulawayo, Zimbabwe	20 July 2018	Scorecard
2nd wicket	263	Inzamam-ul-Haq	Aamer Sohail	New Zealand	Sharjah Cricket Stadium, Sharjah, United Arab Emirates	20 April 1994	Scorecard
4th wicket	260	Agha Salman	Mohammad Rizwan	South Africa	National Stadium, Karachi, Pakistan	12 February 2025	Scorecard
2nd wicket	257	Saleem Elahi	Abdul Razzaq	South Africa	Axxess DSL St. Georges, Port Elizabeth, South Africa	11 December 2002	Scorecard
3rd wicket	230	Saeed Anwar	Ijaz Ahmed	India	Bangabandhu National Stadium, Dhaka, Bangladesh	18 January 1998	Scorecard
Last updated: 1 July 2020

=== Highest overall partnership runs by a pair ===
Rank	Runs	Innings	Players	Highest	Average	100/50	Time span
1	4,082	99	Inzamam-ul-Haq & Mohammad Yousuf	162	44.36	8/22	1998–2007
2	3,517	86	Aamer Sohail & Saeed Anwar	173	41.86	5/23	1990–2000
3	2,950	68	Mohammad Yousuf & Younis Khan	167	44.69	9/12	2000–2010
4	2,571	75	Saeed Anwar & Shahid Afridi	148	34.74	3/14	1996–2003
5	2,468	54	Mohammad Yousuf & Shoaib Malik	206	49.36	6/10	2002–2010
An asterisk (*) signifies an unbroken partnership (i.e. neither of the batsmen was dismissed before either the end of the allotted overs or the required score being reached). Last updated: 11 October 2022

== Umpiring records ==
=== Most matches umpired ===
An umpire in cricket is a person who officiates the match according to the Laws of Cricket. Two umpires adjudicate the match on the field, whilst a third umpire has access to video replays, and a fourth umpire looks after the match balls and other duties. The records below are only for on-field umpires.

Aleem Dar of Pakistan holds the record for the most ODI matches umpired with 231. Rudi Koertzen of South Africa is behind at 208 matches. They are followed by New Zealand's Billy Bowden who officiated in 200 matches.

Rank	Matches	Umpire	Period
1	231♠	Aleem Dar†	2000–2023
2	98	Asad Rauf	2000–2013
3	55	Khizer Hayat	1978–1996
4	43	Nadeem Ghauri	2000–2010
5	40	Javed Akhtar	1976–1999
Last updated: 5 July 2023

== See also ==
- List of One Day International cricket records
- List of players who have scored 10,000 or more runs in One Day International cricket
- List of One Day International cricket hat-tricks
- List of Test cricket records
- List of List A cricket records
- List of Cricket World Cup records
