= New Zealand cricket team in Pakistan and Sri Lanka in 1984–85 =

International cricket tour

The New Zealand national cricket team toured Pakistan and Sri Lanka in November and December 1984 to play a three-match Test series against the Pakistani national cricket team. The second Test match of the series was the 1,000th Test to be played. Pakistan won the Test series 2–0. New Zealand were captained by Jeremy Coney and Pakistan by Zaheer Abbas. In addition, New Zealand played two Limited Overs Internationals (LOI) against the Sri Lankan national cricket team and four against Pakistan.

== One Day Internationals vs Sri Lanka ==
The series between New Zealand and Sri Lanka was drawn 1-1.

=== 1st ODI ===
3 November 1984
Scorecard

New Zealand; 171/6 (45 overs)	v	Sri Lanka; 174/6 (39.4 overs)
JJ Crowe 57* (66); VB John 3/39 (9 overs)		PA de Silva 50* (54); JV Coney 2/16 (4 overs)

Sri Lanka won by 4 wickets
Paikiasothy Saravanamuttu Stadium, Colombo
Umpires: DP Buultjens and HC Felsinger
Player of the match: PA de Silva (SL)

- New Zealand won the toss and elected to bat.
- SAR Silva (SL) made his ODI debut.

=== 2nd ODI ===
4 November 1984
Scorecard

Sri Lanka; 114/9 (41 overs)	v	New Zealand; 118/3 (31.4 overs)
A Ranatunga 15 (33); PA de Silva 15 (19); ALF de Mel 15 (11); MD Crowe 2/20 (9 overs)		MD Crowe 52* (57); ALF de Mel 2/26 (7 overs)

New Zealand won by 7 wickets
Tyronne Fernando Stadium, Moratuwa
Umpires: KT Francis and PW Vidanagamage
Player of the match: MD Crowe (NZ)

- New Zealand won the toss and elected to field.
- The match was reduced from 45 overs to 41 overs per side.
- EJ Gray (NZ) made his ODI debut.

== One Day Internationals vs Pakistan ==
Pakistan won the Wills Series 3–1.

=== 1st ODI ===
12 November 1984
Scorecard

Pakistan; 191/5 (39 overs)	v	New Zealand; 145 (36.2 overs)
Javed Miandad 80* (86); BL Cairns 2/38 (8 overs)		IDS Smith 59 (60); Zakir Khan 4/19 (8 overs)

Pakistan won by 46 runs
Arbab Niaz Stadium, Peshawar
Umpires: Athar Zaidi and Javed Akhtar
Player of the match: Zakir Khan (PAK)

- New Zealand won the toss and elected to field.
- The match was reduced from 40 overs to 39 overs per side.
- Zakir Khan (PAK) made his ODI debut.

=== 2nd ODI ===
23 November 1984
Scorecard

Pakistan; 157/5 (20 overs)	v	New Zealand; 152/7 (20 overs)
Saleem Malik 41 (34); MD Crowe 2/17 (4 overs)		JG Wright 55 (47); Mudassar Nazar 4/27 (4 overs)

Pakistan won by 5 runs
Iqbal Stadium, Faisalabad
Umpires: Amanullah Khan and Ikram Rabbani
Player of the match: Saleem Malik (PAK)

- New Zealand won the toss and elected to field.
- The match was reduced before play started from 40 overs to 20 overs per side.
- Shoaib Mohammad and Wasim Akram (both PAK) made their ODI debuts.

=== 3rd ODI ===
2 December 1984
Scorecard

New Zealand; 187/9 (36 overs)	v	Pakistan; 153/8 (36 overs)
MD Crowe 67 (61); Tauseef Ahmed 4/38 (6 overs)		Zaheer Abbas 42 (51); MD Crowe 2/21 (5 overs)

New Zealand won by 34 runs
Jinnah Stadium, Sialkot
Umpires: Rab Nawaz and Shakoor Rana
Player of the match: MD Crowe (NZ)

- Pakistan won the toss and elected to field.
- The match was reduced from 40 overs to 36 overs per side.
- Mohsin Kamal (PAK) made his ODI debut.

=== 4th ODI ===
7 December 1984
Scorecard

New Zealand; 213/8 (35 overs)	v	Pakistan; 214/9 (35 overs)
IDS Smith 41 (40); Saadat Ali 2/24 (4 overs)		Zaheer Abbas 73 (62); MC Snedden 3/38 (7 overs)

Pakistan won by 1 wicket
Ibn-e-Qasim Bagh Stadium, Multan
Umpires: Babu Khan Tahir and Said Shah
Player of the match: Zaheer Abbas (PAK)

- New Zealand won the toss and elected to bat.
- The match was reduced before play started from 40 overs to 35 overs per side.
- Masood Iqbal (PAK) made his ODI debut.

== Test series summary ==
=== First Test ===
16 – 20 November 1984
(5–day match)
Scorecard

New Zealand	v	Pakistan
157 (74.4 overs); MD Crowe 55 (116); Iqbal Qasim 4/41 (22.4 overs)		221 (93.2 overs); Mohsin Khan 58 (132); EJ Chatfield 3/57 (27.2 overs)
241 (83 overs); JG Wright 65 (108); Iqbal Qasim 4/65 (30 overs)		181/4 (65.1 overs); Javed Miandad 48* (101); EJ Gray 2/45 (18 overs)

Pakistan won by 6 wickets
Gaddafi Stadium, Lahore
Umpires: Mahboob Shah and Shakeel Khan
Player of the match: Iqbal Qasim (PAK)

- New Zealand won the toss and elected to bat.
- DA Stirling (NZ) made his Test debut.

=== Second Test ===
25 – 29 November 1984
(5–day match)
Scorecard

New Zealand	v	Pakistan
267 (108.3 overs); JF Reid 106 (325); Abdul Qadir 5/108 (40.3 overs)		230 (91.1 overs); Javed Miandad 104 (217); SL Boock 7/87 (37 overs)
189 (56.1 overs); JJ Crowe 57 (140); Iqbal Qasim 5/78 (24.1 overs)		230/3 (64.4 overs); Mudassar Nazar 106 (187); MD Crowe 2/29 (8 overs)

Pakistan won by 7 wickets
Niaz Stadium, Hyderabad
Umpires: Khizer Hayat and Mian Mohammad Aslam
Player of the match: Javed Miandad (PAK)

- New Zealand won the toss and elected to bat.
- 28 November was taken as a rest day.
- The match was scheduled for five days but completed in four.

=== Third Test ===
10 – 15 December 1984
(5–day match)
Scorecard

Pakistan	v	New Zealand
328 (120 overs); Anil Dalpat 52 (105); SL Boock 4/83 (41 overs)		426 (157.4 overs); JG Wright 107 (200); Azeem Hafeez 4/132 (46.4 overs)
308/5 (94 overs); Saleem Malik 119* (169); SL Boock 2/83 (30 overs)

Match drawn
National Stadium, Karachi
Umpires: Javed Akhtar and Shakoor Rana
Player of the match: Saleem Malik (PAK)

- Pakistan won the toss and elected to bat.
- 13 December was taken as a rest day.
