= West Indian cricket team in Pakistan in 1985–86 =

International cricket tour

	West Indies	Pakistan
- Dates: 27 November – 6 December 1985
Captains	IVA Richards	Imran Khan

One Day International series
- Results: West Indies won the 5-match series 3–2
Most runs	IVA Richards (260)	Javed Miandad (160)
Most wickets	MA Holding (9)	Wasim Akram (6)

The West Indies national cricket team toured Pakistan from 27 November to 6 December 1985 and played a five-match One Day International series against Pakistan. West Indies won the series 3–2.

== One Day Internationals (ODIs) ==
West Indies won the Wills Series 3–2.

=== 1st ODI ===
27 November 1985
Scorecard

Pakistan; 218/5 (40 overs)	v	West Indies; 224/2 (35.3 overs)
Mudassar Nazar 77 (122); RA Harper 2/37 (8 overs)		IVA Richards 80* (39); Wasim Akram 1/31 (6 overs)

West Indies won by 8 wickets
Municipal Stadium, Gujranwala
Umpires: Athar Zaidi and Khizer Hayat
Player of the match: IVA Richards (WIN)

- West Indies won the toss and elected to field.

=== 2nd ODI ===
29 November 1985
Scorecard

West Indies; 173 (36.2 overs)	v	Pakistan; 175/4 (38.3 overs)
IVA Richards 53 (57); Abdul Qadir 4/17 (5.2 overs)		Mohsin Khan 43 (84); AH Gray 2/36 (8 overs)

Pakistan won by 6 wickets
Gaddafi Stadium, Lahore
Umpires: Amanullah Khan and Shakoor Rana
Player of the match: Abdul Qadir (PAK)

- Pakistan won the toss and elected to field.

=== 3rd ODI ===
2 December 1985
Scorecard

West Indies; 201/5 (40 overs)	v	Pakistan; 161 (39.3 overs)
IVA Richards 66 (39); Imran Khan 3/39 (7 overs)		Rameez Raja 38 (61); MA Holding 4/17 (7.3 overs)

West Indies won by 40 runs
Shahi Bagh Stadium, Peshawar
Umpires: Ikram Rabbani and Mian Mohammad Aslam
Player of the match: IVA Richards (WIN)

- West Indies won the toss and decided to bat

=== 4th ODI ===
4 December 1985
Scorecard

West Indies; 199/8 (40 overs)	v	Pakistan; 203/5 (39.1 overs)
RB Richardson 92* (118); Wasim Akram 2/41 (6 overs)		Javed Miandad 67* (82); IVA Richards 1/6 (2 overs)

Pakistan won by 5 wickets
Pindi Club Ground, Rawalpindi
Umpires: Shakoor Rana and Tariq Ata
Player of the match: Shoaib Mohammad (PAK)

- Pakistan won the toss and elected to field.
- Zulqarnain (PAK) made his ODI debut.

=== 5th ODI ===
6 December 1985
Scorecard

Pakistan; 127/7 (38 overs)	v	West Indies; 128/2 (34.1 overs)
Mohsin Khan 54 (106); MD Marshall 2/25 (8 overs)		IVA Richards 40* (36); Wasim Akram 1/25 (8 overs)

West Indies won by 8 wickets
National Stadium, Karachi
Umpires: Mahboob Shah and Shakeel Khan
Player of the match: MD Marshall (WIN)

- West Indies won the toss and elected to field.
- The match was reduced to 38 overs.
