= Zakir Khan =

Zakir Khan may refer to:

- Zakir Khan (comedian) (born 1987), Indian comedian
- Zakir Khan (cricketer) (born 1963), Pakistani cricketer
- Zakir Husain Khan (1897–1969), President of India 1967–1969

== Other ==
- Zaki Khan
