= Pakistani cricket team against Afghanistan in Sri Lanka in 2023 =

International cricket tour

Pakistan cricket team against Afghanistan in Sri Lanka in 2023
	Afghanistan	Pakistan
- Dates: 22 – 26 August 2023
Captains	Hashmatullah Shahidi	Babar Azam

One Day International series
- Results: Pakistan won the 3-match series 3–0
Most runs	Rahmanullah Gurbaz (174)	Imam-ul-Haq (165)
Most wickets	Mujeeb Ur Rahman (5); Fazalhaq Farooqi (5)	Shaheen Afridi (6)
- Player of the series: Imam-ul-Haq (Pak)

The Pakistan national cricket team toured Sri Lanka in August 2023 to play three One Day International (ODI) matches against Afghanistan. The dates of the tour was confirmed in July 2023. The tour formed part of both teams' preparations for the 2023 Asia Cup tournament.

== Squads ==
Afghanistan	Pakistan
Hashmatullah Shahidi (c); Abdul Rahman; Noor Ahmad; Ikram Alikhil (wk); Fazalhaq Farooqi; Rahmanullah Gurbaz (wk); Riaz Hassan; Rashid Khan; Wafadar Momand; Mujeeb Ur Rahman; Mohammad Nabi; Azmatullah Omarzai; Mohammad Saleem; Rahmat Shah; Shahidullah; Ibrahim Zadran; ~~Najibullah Zadran~~	Babar Azam (c); Shadab Khan (vc); Shaheen Afridi; Salman Ali Agha; Iftikhar Ahmed; Faheem Ashraf; Mohammad Haris (wk); Haris Rauf; Imam-ul-Haq; Usama Mir; Mohammad Nawaz; Mohammad Rizwan (wk); Abdullah Shafique; Naseem Shah; Saud Shakeel; Tayyab Tahir; Mohammad Wasim; Fakhar Zaman

Afghanistan named Fareed Ahmad and Shahidullah as reserves in their squad. Ahead of the series, Shahidullah was added to Afghanistan's main squad in place of Najibullah Zadran, who got ruled out of the series due to a knee injury.

== ODI series ==
=== 1st ODI ===
22 August 2023
15:00 (D/N)
Scorecard

Pakistan; 201 (47.1 overs)	v	Afghanistan; 59 (19.2 overs)
Imam-ul-Haq 61 (94); Mujeeb Ur Rahman 3/33 (10 overs)		Rahmanullah Gurbaz 18 (47); Haris Rauf 5/18 (6.2 overs)

Pakistan won by 142 runs
Mahinda Rajapaksa International Cricket Stadium, Hambantota
Umpires: Ahmed Shah Durrani (Afg) and Nitin Menon (Ind)
Player of the match: Haris Rauf (Pak)

- Pakistan won the toss and elected to bat.
- Haris Rauf (Pak) took his maiden five-wicket haul in ODIs.

=== 2nd ODI ===
24 August 2023
15:00 (D/N)
Scorecard

Afghanistan; 300/5 (50 overs)	v	Pakistan; 302/9 (49.5 overs)
Rahmanullah Gurbaz 151 (151); Shaheen Afridi 2/58 (10 overs)		Imam-ul-Haq 91 (105); Fazalhaq Farooqi 3/69 (9.5 overs)

Pakistan won by 1 wicket
Mahinda Rajapaksa International Cricket Stadium, Hambantota
Umpires: Sharfuddoula (Ban) and Bismillah Jan Shinwari (Afg)
Player of the match: Shadab Khan (Pak)

- Afghanistan won the toss and elected to bat.

=== 3rd ODI ===
26 August 2023
15:00 (D/N)
Scorecard

Pakistan; 268/8 (50 overs)	v	Afghanistan; 209 (48.4 overs)
Mohammad Rizwan 67 (79); Gulbadin Naib 2/36 (9 overs)		Mujeeb Ur Rahman 64 (37); Shadab Khan 3/42 (10 overs)

Pakistan won by 59 runs
R. Premadasa Stadium, Colombo
Umpires: Nitin Menon (Ind) and Izatullah Safi (Afg)
Player of the match: Mohammad Rizwan (Pak)

- Pakistan won the toss and elected to bat.
- Mujeeb Ur Rahman score the fastest fifty for Afghanistan in ODI in 25 balls.
