= Owais Rehmani =

Pakistani cricketer (born 1987)

Personal information
- Born: 30 September 1987 (age 39); Karachi, Pakistan
- Source: ESPNcricinfo, 22 October 2016

Owais Rehmani (born 30 September 1987) is a Pakistani cricketer. He made his first-class debut for Karachi Whites in the 2007–08 Quaid-e-Azam Trophy on 21 October 2007.

In 2015, he represented Pakistan Navy in the International Defence Cricket Challenge and was named the best batsman and player of the tournament against the Royal Malaysian Air Force.
