= Fakhar Zaman (cricketer) =

Pakistani cricketer (born 1990)

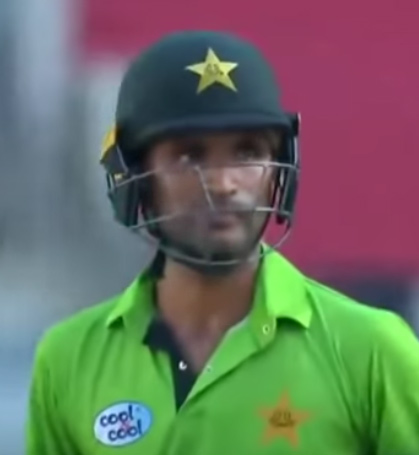
- Zaman in October 2017

Personal information
- Born: 10 April 1990 (age 36); Mardan, Khyber Pakhtunkhwa, Pakistan
- Height: 5 ft 11 in (180 cm)
- Batting: Left-handed
- Bowling: Slow left-arm orthodox
- Role: Opening batter

International information
- National side: Pakistan (2017–present)
- Test debut (cap 234): 16 October 2018 v Australia
- Last Test: 3 January 2019 v South Africa
- ODI debut (cap 212): 7 June 2017 v South Africa
- Last ODI: 31 October 2026 v Sri Lanka
- ODI shirt no.: 39
- T20I debut (cap 74): 30 March 2017 v West Indies
- Last T20I: 28 February 2026 v Sri Lanka
- T20I shirt no.: 39

Domestic team information
- Years: Team
- 2012–2015: Karachi
- 2016: Peshawar
- 2017– present: Lahore Qalandars (squad no. 39)
- 2017: Balochistan
- 2017: Comilla Victorians
- 2019: Glamorgan (squad no. 39)
- 2019/20–2023: Khyber Pakhtunkhwa (squad no. 39)
- 2021/20: Brisbane Heat (squad no. 39)
- 2024: Antigua & Barbuda Falcons

Career statistics
Competition	Test	ODI	T20I	FC
Matches	3	92	120	56
Runs scored	192	3,861	2,494	3,430
Batting average	32.00	45.42	23.98	38.53
100s/50s	0/2	11/19	0/14	6/24
Top score	94	210*	91	205
Balls bowled	–	135	6	571
Wickets	–	1	0	10
Bowling average	–	111.00	–	27.50
5 wickets in innings	–	0	–	0
10 wickets in match	–	0	–	0
Best bowling	–	1/19	–	2/2
Catches/stumpings	3/–	44/-	59/–	49/–
Medal record
Men's Cricket
Representing Pakistan
Champions Trophy
Winner	2017 England & Wales
ICC Men's T20 World Cup
Runner-up	2022 Australia
Asia Cup
Runner-up	2022 UAE
Runner-up	2025 UAE
- Source: Cricinfo, 8 March 2026
- Military career
- Allegiance: Pakistan
- Branch: Pakistan Navy
- Service years: 2007–2013
- Rank: Leading seaman (Note: Zaman was awarded the honorary rank of lieutenant in 2020)
- Unit: Naval Operational Branch

Fakhar Zaman (Note: Urdu, Pashto: فخر زمان) (pronounced [fəxər zəmaːɳ]; born 10 April 1990) is a Pakistani international cricketer who plays for the Pakistan national cricket team. A left-handed opening batter, he is noted for his attacking style of play.

He represents the Lahore Qalandars in the Pakistan Super League. Zaman gained prominence after scoring a century in the 2017 ICC Champions Trophy Final, where Pakistan defeated India by 180 runs and he was named player of the match for his innings of 114 off 106 balls.

On 20 July 2018, he became the first Pakistani batsman to score a double century in a One Day International (ODI). Two days later, he became the fastest batsman to reach 1,000 ODI runs. In August 2018, he was among 33 players awarded central contracts by the Pakistan Cricket Board for the 2018–19 season.

On 4 April 2021, while chasing against South Africa in the second ODI, Zaman scored 193 before being run out by Quinton de Kock. His 193 became the highest individual score in an ODI chase, surpassing Shane Watson's 185 against Bangladesh. In November 2023, he hit 11 sixes against New Zealand during the 2023 Cricket World Cup, breaking Imran Nazir's record for most sixes by a Pakistani in a World Cup innings.

== Early and personal life ==
Fakhar was born on 10 April 1990 in Katlang in the Mardan District of Khyber Pakhtunkhwa into a Pashtun family. The youngest among five brothers and two sisters, his father is a farmer while an elder brother is a teacher at Government High School Katlang.

He moved to Karachi at the age of 16 following matriculation.

In 2007, Zaman joined the Pakistan Navy as a sailor after receiving his schooling and training at sea from the Pakistan Navy School, Bahadur. His choice of career was persuaded by his father, who was dissuaded by Fakhar's childhood addiction to cricket and wanted his son to focus on his academics. The name Fakhar literally translates to "pride". Amongst his teammates, he is known by the nickname fauji (soldier).

In 2012, he represented the navy in the International Defence Cricket Challenge Cup in Australia and was named best player of the tournament. Later in 2020, the navy awarded him the honorary rank of Lieutenant, in recognition of his contribution to cricket.

== Domestic and franchise career ==
In Karachi, he continued to play cricket occasionally in inter-departmental matches, including representations for the Pakistan Navy cricket team. He was first identified by his navy coach, Azam Khan, who encouraged him to pursue professional cricket. In 2013, he left his naval career after a "tough decision" in pursuit of this dream and began appearing for regional outfits like Khyber Pakhtunkhwa, Abbottabad Falcons, Balochistan and several Karachi teams. He became the second-highest run scorer in the 2016 Pakistan Cup and also impressed selectors in the 2016–17 Quaid-e-Azam Trophy. He was soon noticed by Pakistan coach Mickey Arthur during a training camp in Lahore, following which he earned a call-up for the national side.

In August 2017, he was named in Durban Qalandars' squad for the first season of the T20 Global League. However, in October 2017, Cricket South Africa initially postponed the tournament until November 2018, with it being cancelled soon after.

In July 2019, he was selected to play for the Rotterdam Rhinos in the inaugural edition of the Euro T20 Slam cricket tournament. However, the following month the tournament was cancelled.

In January 2021, he was named in Khyber Pakhtunkhwa's squad for the 2020–21 Pakistan Cup.

In December 2022, he was signed by the Khulna Tigers for the 2022–23 Bangladesh Premier League.

=== Pakistan Super League ===
Fakhar Zaman's record in PSL matches
Matches	Runs	HS	100s	50s	Avg.	SR.
76	2368	110*	2	18	31.57	142.30

Zaman was picked by the Lahore Qalandars side for the 2017 Pakistan Super League, where he was closely mentored by New Zealand player Brendon McCullum. In his first three seasons, he experienced consistent setbacks as Lahore ended at the bottom of the league table each time, failing to qualify for the knockouts. Individually, he delivered decent performances, mount up to 739 runs, including a match winning performance of 94 runs in 2018. He saw more success in the 2020 season of the PSL, ending the tournament as the second highest run scorer. His performance played a crucial role in Qalandar's journey to the finals, although they ultimately lost to Karachi Kings.

Zaman was released by Qalandars before the 2022 PSL, although he was picked up again in the drafts.

He led Qalandars to their first PSL title in 2022. He concluded the season as the highest run scorer, surpassing Babar Azam's record for scoring the most runs and achieving the most 50 plus scores in a single season. In the same season, he also scored his first PSL century against Karachi Kings.

In the following season, he scored his second PSL century against Islamabad United on 9 March 2023. He also became the second batsman to reach 2000 runs in PSL. His contributions led Qalandars to winning the second PSL title in a row.

== International career ==
=== 2017: Debut and Champions Trophy ===
In March 2017, he was named in Pakistan's limited overs squad for their matches against the West Indies. He made his Twenty20 International (T20I) debut for Pakistan against the West Indies on 30 March 2017.

In April 2017, he was named in Pakistan's One Day International (ODI) squad for the 2017 ICC Champions Trophy. He made his ODI debut for Pakistan against South Africa in the Champions Trophy on 7 June 2017, scoring 31 runs.

In the final against India, Zaman edged to the wicket-keeper, when he was on 3, but survived as it was a no-ball, bowled by Jasprit Bumrah and that was the biggest turning point in that match. After that, Zaman went on to score his maiden ODI century and helped Pakistan post a total of 338. With that, Zaman became the first batsman for Pakistan to score a century in an ICC event final. India batting second collapsed and Pakistan won the match by 180 runs to become the winners of Champions Trophy for the first time. Zaman was adjudged man of the match for his batting performance. Zaman and Azhar Ali's partnership in the match was 128 runs, making it the highest opening partnership in the Champions Trophy history for Pakistan.

=== 2018: England, Zimbabwe and Australia ===
In April 2018, he was named in Pakistan's Test squad for their tours to Ireland and England in May 2018, but he did not play.

On 8 July 2018, Fakhar scored 91 runs against Australia in the tri-series final in Harare to help Pakistan secure the title. He was named player of the match and player of the series. During his innings he also became the first Pakistani batsman to score 500 or more runs in T20Is in a calendar year.

On 20 July 2018, in the fourth ODI against Zimbabwe, he became the first batsman for Pakistan to score a double century in ODIs, finishing 210 not out. In the same match, he and Imam-ul-Haq made the then highest opening partnership in ODIs, scoring 304 runs. His innings propelled Pakistan's total to 399, which was their highest score in ODIs.

Two days later, in the fifth match of the series, Zaman became the fastest player to score 1,000 runs in ODIs. He reached the milestone in 18 innings, beating the previous record of 21 innings, held by five other batsmen. Zaman went on to score 85 runs in the match, bringing his total to 515 runs in the series, the most by a Pakistan batsman in a bilateral ODI series. Zaman and Imam had scored 705 runs together across the series, the most by a pair in a bilateral ODI series. Zaman also recorded the most runs scored by a batsman between two dismissals in ODIs, with 455.

In September 2018, he was named in Pakistan's Test squad for their series against Australia. He made his Test debut for Pakistan against Australia on 16 October 2018. He made 94 and 66 on Test debut.

=== 2019: Cricket World Cup year ===
In April 2019, he was named in Pakistan's squad for the 2019 Cricket World Cup. Ahead of the Cricket World Cup, in the ODI series against England, Zaman scored 138 runs in the second ODI match. This was the highest individual total for a Pakistan batsman against England in a One Day International. However, three days later, Imam-ul-Haq set a new record with 151 runs, in the third ODI of the series.

=== 2020–2022 ===
In June 2020, he was named in a 29-man squad for Pakistan's tour to England during the COVID-19 pandemic. However, on 23 June 2020, Zaman was one of seven players from Pakistan's squad to test positive for COVID-19.

On 4 April 2021, in the second ODI against South Africa, Zaman scored 193 runs. It was the highest individual score while chasing in an ODI match, surpassing 185 scored by Shane Watson against Bangladesh. Pakistan lost the ODI by 17 runs, with Fakhar's 193 being the second-highest score in an ODI defeat, behind Charles Coventry's 194 not out. On 5 May 2021, Zaman was nominated for the ICC's Player of the Month award for April. In September 2021, he was named as one of three travelling reserve players in Pakistan's squad for the 2021 ICC Men's T20 World Cup.

In the annual ICC Awards in January 2022, Fakhar Zaman was named in the ICC Men's ODI Team of the Year for the year 2021.

In the ICC Men's T20 World Cup 2022, Zaman was ruled out of the event after he suffered a knee injury when playing against the Netherlands.

=== 2023 Cricket World Cup ===
Fakhar Zaman was selected in Pakistan's squad for the 2023 Cricket World Cup. He failed to perform in the first game and was dropped from the team immediately. He returned to play against Bangladesh on 31 October, scoring match-winning 81 runs off 74 balls. He was awarded Man of the Match for his spectacular performance. On 4 November 2023, Fakhar Zaman scored 126 runs from 81 balls against New Zealand scoring the 5th fastest century in the 2023 ICC Cricket World Cup and the 10th fastest overall in ODI World Cup history. He was also awarded Player of the Match for his performance, scoring 11 sixes and 8 fours.

He was named as ICC Men's Player of the Month award for April 2023.

=== 2024-2026 ===
In May 2024, he was named in Pakistan's squad for the 2024 ICC Men's T20 World Cup tournament.

In October 2026, he was named Player of the Match in the home ODI Tri-Series final against Sri Lanka. During the match, he scored his 12th ODI century, with an innings of 127 runs off 99 balls, including 11 fours and six sixes.

== Playing style ==
Fakhar Zaman is a left-handed opening batter known for his attacking style. He uses a high backlift and a strong bottom hand, which help him play powerful shots, especially through the off side. He is considered an aggressive player in limited-overs cricket and often plays a leading role when Pakistan bats first. His performances in the Pakistan Super League helped him become a regular opener for the national team.

== Beyond cricket ==
=== Cricket academy in Australia ===
In January 2024, Zaman established a cricket academy in Melbourne, Australia. The inauguration event was attended by a large number of children who interacted with Zaman, participated in various activities, and took photographs with him.

=== Men's grooming brand launch ===
On 27 February 2024, Zaman launched his men's grooming brand, FZ39 BEAUTY, at the Pearl Continental Hotel in Lahore. The brand features organic and natural products for beard care, along with a signature fragrance named GORJ39 Perfume. The launch event was attended by Zaman's family members, teammates from Lahore Qalandars, and friends.

== See also ==
- List of highest individual scores in ODIs
- List of One Day International cricket double centuries
