= West Indian cricket team in Pakistan in 1990–91 =

International cricket tour

The West Indies cricket team toured Pakistan in October to November 1990 and played a three-match Test series against the Pakistan national cricket team. The Test series was drawn 1–1. West Indies were captained by Desmond Haynes and Pakistan by Imran Khan. In addition, the teams played a three-match Limited Overs International (LOI) series which Pakistan won 3–0.

== Test series summary ==
=== 1st Test ===
15–20 November 1990
(5-day match)
Scorecard

West Indies	v	Pakistan
261 (83.3 overs); DL Haynes 117 (241); Waqar Younis 5/76 (22 overs)		345 (133.2 overs); Saleem Malik 102 (208); CEL Ambrose 4/78 (34 overs)
181 (67.3 overs); AL Logie 58 (99); Waqar Younis 4/44 (17 overs)		98/2 (37 overs); Shoaib Mohammad 32* (105); CA Walsh 2/27 (12 overs)

Pakistan won by 8 wickets
National Stadium, Karachi
Umpires: Khizer Hayat and Riazuddin
Player of the match: Saleem Malik (PAK)

- West Indies won the toss and elected to bat.
- 19 November was taken as a rest day.
- Zahid Fazal (PAK) made his Test debut.

=== 2nd Test ===
23–25 November 1990
(5-day match)
Scorecard

Pakistan	v	West Indies
170 (54.2 overs); Saleem Malik 74 (116); IR Bishop 4/47 (17.2 overs)		195 (56 overs); RB Richardson 44 (66); Waqar Younis 5/46 (16 overs)
154 (40.2 overs); Saleem Malik 71 (98); MD Marshall 4/24 (4.2 overs)		130/3 (29.2 overs); RB Richardson 70* (86); Wasim Akram 3/46 (12 overs)

West Indies won by 7 wickets
Iqbal Stadium, Faisalabad
Umpires: Khizer Hayat and Riazuddin
Player of the match: RB Richardson (WI)

- Pakistan won the toss and elected to bat.
- The match was scheduled for five days but completed in three.
- Saeed Anwar and Moin Khan (both PAK) made their Test debuts

=== 3rd Test ===
6–11 December 1990
(5-day match)
Scorecard

West Indies	v	Pakistan
294 (78.5 overs); CL Hooper 134 (220); Wasim Akram 4/61 (24 overs)		122 (49.2 overs); Wasim Akram 38 (84); CEL Ambrose 5/35 (20 overs)
173 (48 overs); AL Logie 59 (63); Wasim Akram 5/28 (9 overs)		242/6 (96.4 overs); Imran Khan 58* (162); CA Walsh 2/53 (19 overs)

Match drawn
Gaddafi Stadium, Lahore
Umpires: Khizer Hayat and Riazuddin
Player of the match: CL Hooper (WI)

- West Indies won the toss and elected to bat.
- 9 December was taken as a rest day.
- Masood Anwar (PAK) and BC Lara (WI) made their Test debuts.

== One Day Internationals (ODIs) ==
Pakistan won the series 3-0.

=== 1st ODI ===
9 November 1990
Scorecard

Pakistan; 211/5 (40 overs)	v	West Indies; 205/7 (40 overs)
Saleem Malik 58 (64); CEL Ambrose 2/40 (8 overs)		RB Richardson 69 (86); Waqar Younis 5/52 (8 overs)

Pakistan won by 6 runs
National Stadium, Karachi
Umpires: Khizer Hayat and Mahboob Shah
Player of the match: Waqar Younis (PAK)

- Pakistan won the toss and elected to bat.
- BC Lara (WI) made his ODI debut.

=== 2nd ODI ===
11 November 1990
Scorecard

West Indies; 176/7 (39 overs)	v	Pakistan; 177/5 (37.1 overs)
DL Haynes 66 (91); Saleem Jaffar 2/20 (8 overs)		Saleem Malik 91* (98); IR Bishop 2/36 (7 overs)

Pakistan won by 5 wickets
Gaddafi Stadium, Lahore
Umpires: Ikram Rabbani and Javed Akhtar
Player of the match: Saleem Malik (PAK)

- West Indies won the toss and elected to bat.
- The match was reduced from 40 to 39 overs per side.

=== 3rd ODI ===
13 November 1990
Scorecard

Pakistan; 168/9 (40 overs)	v	West Indies; 137/7 (40 overs)
Imran Khan 46* (59); CA Walsh 3/28 (8 overs)		CG Greenidge 35 (110); Mushtaq Ahmed 3/31 (8 overs)

Pakistan won by 31 runs
Ibn-e-Qasim Bagh Stadium, Multan
Umpires: Riazuddin and Siddiq Khan
Player of the match: Imran Khan (PAK)

- Pakistan won the toss and elected to bat.
- Moin Khan (PAK) made his ODI debut.
