= Pakistani cricket team in Zimbabwe in 1992–93 =

International cricket tour

The Pakistani national cricket team visited Zimbabwe in March 1993 and played a single Limited Overs International (LOI) only on 2 March 1993 at Harare Sports Club, Harare, against the Zimbabwean national cricket team. Pakistan won by 7 wickets and were captained by Wasim Akram; Zimbabwe by David Houghton.

== ODI summary ==
2 March 1993
Scorecard

| Zimbabwe; 164 (49.1 overs) | v | Pakistan; 165/3 (47.2 overs) |
| DL Houghton 51 (74); Mushtaq Ahmed 3/22 (10 overs) | | Javed Miandad 86* (132); AH Omarshah 1/26 (10 overs) |

Pakistan won by 7 wickets
Harare Sports Club, Harare
Umpires: K Kanjee (ZIM) and ID Robinson (ZIM)
Player of the match: Javed Miandad (PAK)

- Pakistan won the toss and elected to field.
