= Imam-ul-Haq =

Pakistani cricketer (born 1995)

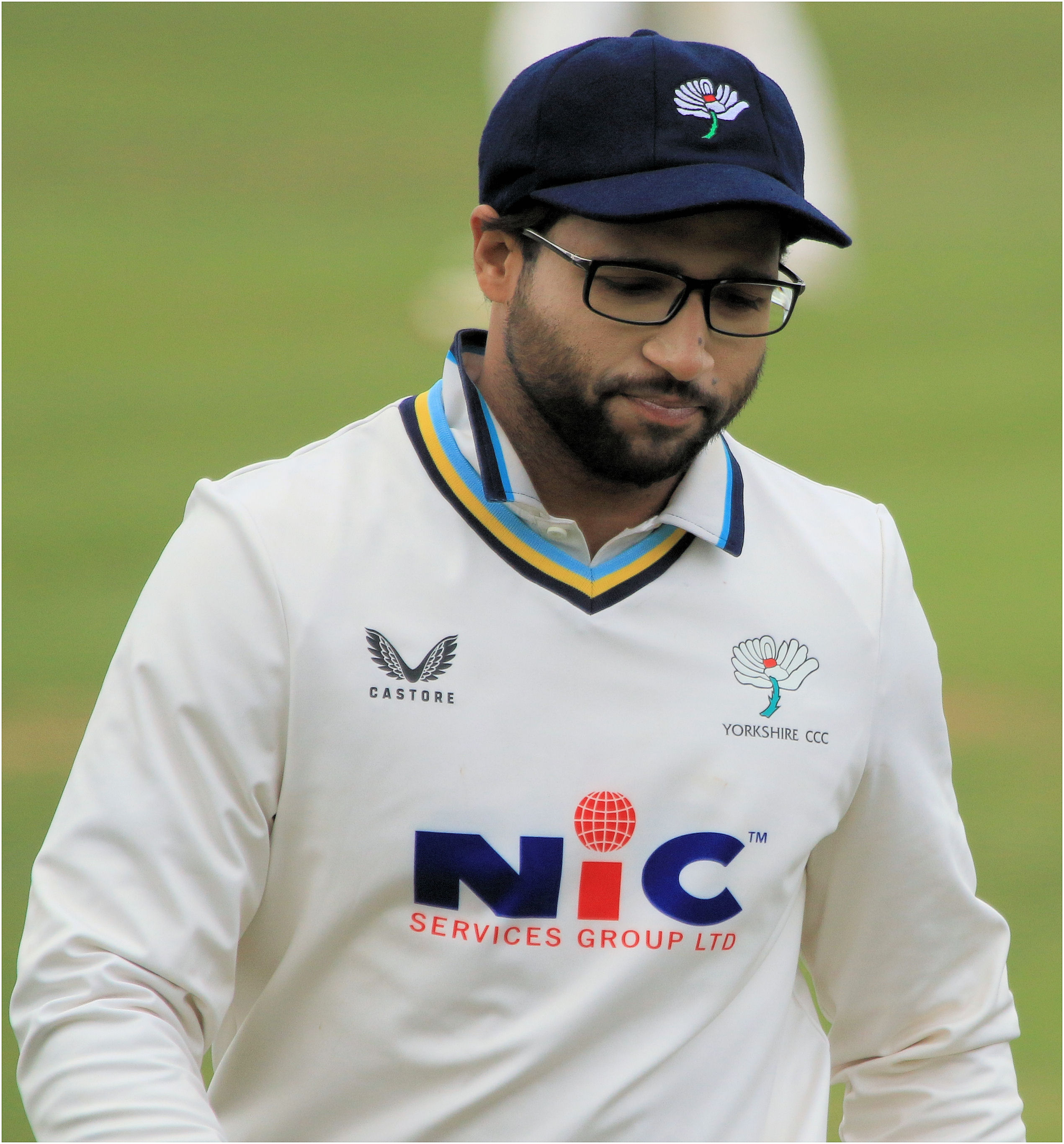
- Imam-ul-Haq playing for Yorkshire in 2025

Personal information
- Born: 22 December 1995 (age 30); Multan, Punjab, Pakistan
- Height: 5 ft 9 in (175 cm)
- Batting: Left-handed
- Bowling: Right arm leg break
- Role: Top-order batter
- Relatives: Inzamam-ul-Haq (uncle)

International information
- National side: Pakistan (2017–present)
- Test debut (cap 231): 11 May 2018 v Ireland
- Last Test: 27 August 2026 v England
- ODI debut (cap 215): 18 October 2017 v Sri Lanka
- Last ODI: 5 April 2025 v New Zealand
- T20I debut (cap 81): 5 May 2019 v England
- Last T20I: 8 November 2019 v Australia

Domestic team information
- Years: Team
- 2012/13: Lahore Shalimar
- 2014/15–2015/16: Khan Research Laboratories
- 2016/17–2017/18: Habib Bank Limited
- 2019–2022: Peshawar Zalmi (squad no. 26)
- 2019–2023: Balochistan
- 2022: Somerset
- 2025: Yorkshire

Career statistics
| Competition | Test | ODI | FC | LA |
|---|---|---|---|---|
| Matches | 31 | 75 | 97 | 131 |
| Runs scored | 1,865 | 3,152 | 6,111 | 5,788 |
| Batting average | 34.53 | 47.04 | 41.29 | 49.05 |
| 100s/50s | 3/11 | 9/20 | 16/28 | 16/38 |
| Top score | 157 | 151 | 202* | 159 |
| Balls bowled | 12 | – | 174 | 28 |
| Wickets | 0 | – | 2 | 0 |
| Bowling average | – | – | 43.00 | – |
| 5 wickets in innings | – | – | 0 | – |
| 10 wickets in match | – | – | 0 | – |
| Best bowling | – | – | 1/4 | – |
| Catches/stumpings | 23/– | 16/– | 59/– | 27/– |
- Source: Cricinfo, 31 August 2026

Imam-ul-Haq (pronounced [ɪmaːm ʊl ɦəq]; born 22 December 1995) is a Pakistani international cricketer who plays for the Pakistan National Cricket Team. In his first One Day International (ODI), against Sri Lanka, he became the second batter for Pakistan, and thirteenth overall, to score a century on debut. In August 2018, he was one of 33 players to be awarded a central contract for the 2018–19 season by the Pakistan Cricket Board (PCB).

== Career ==
=== Domestic ===
In the final of the 2016–17 Quaid-e-Azam Trophy, he scored 200 not out batting for Habib Bank Limited. In the final of 2017–18 National T20 Cup, he scored 59 not out batting for Lahore Blues, and was named man of the match.

In September 2025, during the Hanif Mohammad Trophy, he struck a career-best 330 off 291 balls for Multan Region against Dera Murad Jamali Region in a domestic first-class match at the National Bank Stadium, Karachi. His innings, which included 34 fours and eight sixes, came after a strong 2024–25 season where he scored 823 runs at an average of 68.58. The performance marked his highest score in organized cricket and strengthened his case for a Test recall, having last appeared for Pakistan in the 2023–24 Boxing Day Test in Melbourne.

=== County ===
In July 2022, he was signed by Somerset to play in their final four matches of the County Championship in England.

In July 2025, he joined Yorkshire as an overseas signing in mid-2025, stepping in after Ruturaj Gaikwad withdrew. In August 2025, during the One Day Cup 2025, he produced a string of dominant innings, helping Yorkshire in multiple matches: he scored 159 off 130 balls against Northamptonshire, leading Yorkshire to a massive 202-run victory. Against Lancashire, he scored 117 in a successful chases, guiding Yorkshire to a 7-wicket win. In a match versus Sussex, he anchored a big second wicket stand (196 in 33 overs) with James Wharton, contributing to a comfortable victory. Over the group stage of the One Day Cup, he amassed 583 runs in 7 innings at an average of ~ 97.16, including three centuries and three fifties.

=== International ===
In October 2017, he was named in Pakistan's ODI squad for their series against Sri Lanka. On his ODI debut against Sri Lanka on 18 October 2017, he scored an ODI century and was named man of the match. He became the second Pakistan batter after Saleem Elahi to score an ODI hundred on debut.

In April 2018, he was named in Pakistan's Test squad for their tours to Ireland and England in May 2018. He made his Test debut against Ireland, on 11 May 2018. He scored a half century in the final innings of the match which was instrumental in the team's win.

On 20 July 2018, in the fourth ODI against Zimbabwe, he and Fakhar Zaman made the highest opening partnership in ODIs, with 304 runs. Pakistan finished their innings at 399 for the loss of one wicket, their highest score in ODIs. Zaman and Imam had scored 705 runs together across the series, the most by a pair in a bilateral ODI series.

In January 2019, during the third ODI against South Africa, Imam became the second fastest batter to score 1,000 runs in ODIs, doing so in his 19th innings.

In April 2019, he was named in Pakistan's squad for the 2019 Cricket World Cup. He made his Twenty20 International (T20I) debut for Pakistan against England on 5 May 2019. Ahead of the Cricket World Cup, in the ODI series against England, Imam scored 151 runs in the third ODI match. This was the highest individual total for a Pakistan batter against England in a One Day International.

In June 2020, he was named in a 29-man squad for Pakistan's tour to England during the COVID-19 pandemic. In July, he was shortlisted in Pakistan's 20-man squad for the Test matches against England. In July 2021, in the third match against England, he scored his 2,000th run in ODI cricket.

In March 2022, in the opening match of the series against Australia, Imam scored his first century in Test cricket. In the second innings, he scored another century, becoming the tenth batter for Pakistan to score a century in both innings of a Test.

On 22 August 2023, in the opening match of the 3 ODI series vs Afghanistan, Imam played a crucial inning of 61 Runs where all batting line of Pakistan collapsed at Mahinda Rajapaksa International Cricket Stadium. Pakistan won the match by 142 runs and Imam finished the game as the leading run scorer.

Imam was named in Pakistan's squad for the 2023 Cricket World Cup and he ended up the tournament proceedings with 162 runs in six matches. In February 2025, he was approved as a late minute addition to Pakistan's squad for the 2025 ICC Champions Trophy as he was added as an injury replacement to Fakhar Zaman, as the latter was ruled out of the remainder of the tournament after having played just the opening match of the high-profile tournament. During Pakistan's highly anticipated group stage match against arch-rivals India, his comical runout stirred meme materials across social media platforms and his nature of runout drew wide comparisons with his uncle Inzamam-Ul-haq's spate of run outs during his playing career. He was runout albeit which came off as a bullet throw resulting in a direct hit even before Imam had breached the crease to complete the run and it marked the sixth such instance where Imam had run himself out since his debut in the format.

On 5 April 2025, Imam copped a heavy blow on his face in a freak accident in the middle of the pitch during the third and final ODI match between Pakistan and New Zealand. He was desperately running towards the danger end to cross the crease to complete a quick single to protect his wicket, but quite unexpectedly he was injured when a ball was thrown to the keeper's end in a pickup throw by a New Zealand fieldsman but it hit his helmet grill. He was stretchered straightaway after complaining about the feeling of discomfort and rushed to the hospital from the pitch and he was subsequently replaced by Usman Khan as a concussion substitute who was approved during the run chase of 263 to win in a rain-curtailed fixture.

== Personal life ==
He was born in Multan, Punjab, on 22 December 1995 to a Syed Haryanvi Muslim family. He is the nephew of former Pakistan captain Inzamam-ul-Haq.

On 25 November 2023, Imam ul Haq married Anmol Mehmood in Lahore. His wife Anmol is a resident of Norway and a doctor by profession.
