= International Defence Cricket Challenge =

Inter-service cricket tournament

- Administrator: Australian Services Cricket Association (ASCA)
- Format: One Day International, Twenty20
- First edition: 2009
- Latest edition: 2015
- Tournament format: various
- Number of teams: Australia; New Zealand; Pakistan; Malaysia; Fiji; United Kingdom
- Host: Australia
- Most successful: Pakistan (2 titles)

International Defence Cricket Challenge (IDCC) is an inter-service cricket championship of One Day International and Twenty20 formats coordinated by the Australian Services Cricket Association (ASCA) in Canberra. Chiefly focused on "defence unity through cricket", the tournament was originally introduced in 2007 for various international defence teams to establish better military relations between the associated nations through cultural and sports competitions.

The tournament is held in Australia after every two years participated by eight teams, including men and women armed forces from six countries such as Royal New Zealand Air Force, the New Zealand Army, the Royal Malaysian Air Force, the Australian Army and the Pakistan Armed Forces. Pakistan participated first time in 2012.

== Tournament statistics ==
The 2009 men's final was played by the Australian Army and Royal Malaysian Air Force at Manuka Oval on 26 Nov 2009 while 2012 tournament final was played by the Pakistan Joint Services and the Royal Malaysian Air Force at Manuka Oval on 23 Nov 2012. The tournament's last match was played by the Pakistan Navy and Royal Malaysian Air Force at Manuka Oval, Canberra on 28 November 2015. The 2015 women's final was played between the British Army and the Australian Navy which was won by the British Army against Australia.

=== 2012/13 statistics ===
Participant(s)	Match(es) played	Match(es) won	Tied	Lost	Net run rate	Ref.
Pakistan Joint Services – Navy	7	7	0	0	4.345	
Australian Army	7	5	0	2	0.182	
Royal Malaysian Air Force	7	5	0	2	0.515	
Royal Australian Air Force	7	5	0	2	0.472	
Royal New Zealand Air Force	7	2	1	4	-0.919	
Royal Australian Navy	7	2	1	4	-0.922	
New Zealand Army	7	1	0	6	-1.327	
ANZAC Barbarians	7	0	0	7	-1.915	

== Results ==
The last match held in 2015 was won by the Pakistan Navy against the Royal Malaysian Air force by 10 wickets. Pakistan's batsman Imran Ali was named the best bowler, while Owais Rehmani was named the best batsman and player of the tournament. The previous match played in 2012 was won by the Pakistan Navy against the Royal Malaysian Air Force.
