= Zakir Khan (cricketer) =

Personal information
- Born: 3 April 1963 (age 63); Bannu, Khyber Pakhtunkhwa, Pakistan
- Batting: Right-handed
- Bowling: Right-arm fast-medium

International information
- National side: Pakistan (1984–1990)
- Test debut (cap 104): 22 March 1986 v Sri Lanka
- Last Test: 9 December 1989 v India
- ODI debut (cap 51): 12 November 1984 v New Zealand
- Last ODI: 6 November 1990 v New Zealand

Career statistics
Competition	Test	ODI
Matches	2	17
Runs scored	9	27
Batting average	–	27.00
100s/50s	0/0	0/0
Top score	9*	11*
Balls bowled	444	646
Wickets	5	16
Bowling average	51.79	30.87
5 wickets in innings	0	0
10 wickets in match	0	0
Best bowling	3/80	4/19
Catches/stumpings	1/–	0/–
- Source: ESPNcricinfo, 4 October 2020

Zakir Khan (born 3 April 1963) is a Pakistani cricket administrator and former cricketer who played in two Test matches and 17 One Day Internationals from 1984 to 1990.

He was a fast bowler.

== Cricket administration ==
After retiring from cricket he has assumed different positions within the Pakistan Cricket Board, including being the general manager of the PCB as of 2003, the PCB's director of cricket operations as of 2008, director of domestic cricket as of 2011 and director cricket operations international as of 2021.
