= Ikram Rabbani =

Pakistani cricket umpire

Personal information
- Full name: Ikram Rabbani
- Died: 2 June 2023

Umpiring information
- Tests umpired: 1 (1991)
- ODIs umpired: 6 (1984–1995)
- Source: Cricinfo, 7 July 2013

Ikram Rabbani was a Pakistani former cricket umpire. He stood in one Test match, between Pakistan and Sri Lanka, in 1991 and six ODI games from 1984 to 1995.

== See also ==
- List of Test cricket umpires
- List of One Day International cricket umpires
