= Mudassar Nazar =

Pakistani cricketer (born 1956)

Personal information
- Born: 6 April 1956 (age 70); Lahore, Punjab, Pakistan
- Batting: Right-handed
- Bowling: Right-arm medium
- Relatives: Nazar Mohammad (father); Feroz Nizami (uncle); Mohammad Ilyas (cousin)

International information
- National side: Pakistan (1976–1989)
- Test debut (cap 76): 24 December 1976 v Australia
- Last Test: 24 April 1989 v New Zealand
- ODI debut (cap 21): 23 December 1977 v England
- Last ODI: 14 March 1989 v New Zealand

Career statistics
Competition	Test	ODI	FC	LA
Matches	76	122	220	182
Runs scored	4,114	2,653	14,080	4,439
Batting average	38.09	25.26	43.86	28.27
100s/50s	10/17	0/16	42/59	2/26
Top score	231*	95	241	122*
Balls bowled	5,967	4,855	12,465	6,840
Wickets	66	111	153	151
Bowling average	38.36	30.91	34.51	30.86
5 wickets in innings	1	1	2	1
10 wickets in match	0	0	0	0
Best bowling	6/38	5/29	6/32	5/28
Catches/stumpings	48/–	21/–	143/–	42/–
- Source: CricInfo, 10 November 2017

Mudassar Nazar (Urdu: مدثر نذر; born 6 April 1956) is a Pakistani cricket coach and former cricketer with a career in Test cricket for Pakistan and in league cricket in Pakistan and England. He was an all-rounder and opening batsman who played 76 test and 122 one-day matches for Pakistan. After retiring from professional cricket, he has had a number of administrative positions in the cricketing world, including two stints as coach for Pakistan in 1993 and 2001, for Kenya and for several other teams. He was born in Lahore, Punjab.

Currently, he is an advisor for the Lahore Qalandars cricket team in the Pakistan Super League.

== International career ==
Mudassar made his debut in Test cricket for Pakistan against Australia in Adelaide on 24 December 1976. The son of Test cricketer Nazar Mohammad, he followed in his father's footsteps to open Pakistan's batting. Mudassar now resides in Bolton, England. He played for many prominent league teams in Pakistan, and played his last Test match against New Zealand at Auckland on 28 February 1989, but he continued playing first-class cricket until 1993. He became the second Pakistani after his father to carry the bat as an opener in the fifth Test of the 1982–83 series against India.

One time, Mudassar held a record for highest partnership in Test Cricket of 451-runs, for the 3rd-wicket with Javed Miandad, against India at Hyderabad, Pakistan in 1982–83. He also holds the record for the slowest Test match century and also in terms of minutes (557). He was also a useful bowling option for his captain and earned the reputation of a shock bowler because he was good at breaking long partnerships, besides being a batsman who played long innings.

In the mid-1980s, Mudassar became a spokesman for the Pakistan players' association and claims that criticisms he made about the Pakistan Cricket Board (PCB) led to him being omitted from the Pakistan side.This point of view is consistent with the internal politics of the Pakistan Cricket Board at that time

== Coaching career ==
After retiring from professional cricket, Mudassar became national coach for Pakistan.

In 2003, Mudassar was appointed by the Kenya Cricket Association (KCA) as head coach of its academy in Nairobi, with a two-year contract commencing in January 2004. He was appointed caretaker head coach of the Kenya national cricket team in January 2005 following the resignation of Andy Moles, amid conflict with the KCA.

In January 2021, Mudassar was appointed by the Emirates Cricket Board as a national selector and head of the National Academy Program. He was head coach of the United Arab Emirates national under-19 cricket team for the 2021 ACC Under-19 Asia Cup and the 2022 ICC Under-19 Cricket World Cup.

In March 2023, Mudassar took over as head coach of the United Arab Emirates national cricket team on an interim basis, following the sacking of Robin Singh.
