= 1992 Cricket World Cup round-robin stage =

New Zealand impressed, Australia struggled, Pakistan's fortunate run

Co-hosts New Zealand proved the surprise packet of the tournament, winning their first seven games to finish on top of the table after the round robin. The other hosts, Australia, were one of the pre-tournament favorites but lost their first two matches. They recovered somewhat to win four of the remaining six, but narrowly missed out on the semi-finals. The West Indies also finished with a 4–4 record, but were just behind Australia on run-rate. South Africa made a triumphant return to international cricket with a win over Australia at the SCG in their first match. They and England had solid campaigns and easily qualified for the semis, despite upset losses to Sri Lanka and Zimbabwe respectively. India had a disappointing tournament and never looked likely to progress beyond the round robin. Sri Lanka were still establishing themselves at the highest level and beat only Zimbabwe (who did not yet have Test status) and South Africa. New Zealand were defeated only twice in the tournament, both times by Pakistan, in their final group match and in the semi-final. Pakistan had been lucky to be in the semi-finals at all: following only one victory in their first five matches, they were also fortunate to scrape a point from the washed-out match against England which appeared to be heading for a heavy English victory (Pak 74 all out, Eng 24/1): eventually they finished one point ahead of Australia with an inferior run-rate.

== Points Table ==
Team	Pts	Pld	W	L	NR	T	RD	RR
New Zealand	14	8	7	1	0	0	0.59	4.76
England	11	8	5	2	1	0	0.47	4.36
South Africa	10	8	5	3	0	0	0.14	4.36
Pakistan	9	8	4	3	1	0	0.17	4.33
Australia	8	8	4	4	0	0	0.20	4.22
West Indies	8	8	4	4	0	0	0.07	4.14
India	5	8	2	5	1	0	0.14	4.95
Sri Lanka	5	8	2	5	1	0	−0.68	4.21
Zimbabwe	2	8	1	7	0	0	−1.14	4.03

Teams qualified for knockout stage and final

=== Tournament progression ===
	Round-robin stage								Knockout	
Team	1	2	3	4	5	6	7	8	SF	F
Australia	0	0	2	2	4	4	6	8		
England	2	4	5	7	9	11	11	11	W	L
India	0	1	1	3	5	5	5	5		
New Zealand	2	4	6	8	10	12	14	14	L	
Pakistan	0	2	3	3	3	5	7	9	W	W
South Africa	2	2	2	4	6	8	8	10	L	
Sri Lanka	2	2	3	5	5	5	5	5		
West Indies	2	2	4	4	4	6	8	8		
Zimbabwe	0	0	0	0	0	0	0	2		

Won	Lost	No result

Note: The total points at the end of each group match are listed.
Note: Click on the points (group matches) or W/L (knockout) to see the match summary.

== New Zealand vs Australia ==
22 February 1992
Scorecard

New Zealand; 248/6 (50 overs)	v	Australia; 211 (48.1 overs)
Martin Crowe 100* (134); Craig McDermott 2/43 (10 overs)		David Boon 100 (133); Gavin Larsen 3/30 (10 overs)

New Zealand won by 37 runs
Eden Park, Auckland, New Zealand
Umpires: Khizer Hayat (Pakistan) and David Shepherd (England)
Player of the match: Martin Crowe (New Zealand)

== England vs India ==
22 February 1992
Scorecard

England; 236/9 (50 overs)	v	India; 227 (49.2 overs)
Robin Smith 91 (108); Manoj Prabhakar 2/34 (10 overs)		Ravi Shastri 57 (112); Dermot Reeve 3/38 (6 overs)

England won by 9 runs
WACA Ground, Perth, Australia
Umpires: Dooland Buultjens (Sri Lanka) and Peter McConnell (Australia)
Player of the match: Ian Botham (England)

== Zimbabwe vs Sri Lanka ==
23 February 1992
Scorecard

Zimbabwe; 312/4 (50 overs)	v	Sri Lanka; 313/7 (49.2 overs)
Andy Flower 115* (152); Pramodya Wickramasinghe 2/50 (10 overs)		Arjuna Ranatunga 88* (61); Eddo Brandes 3/70 (10 overs)

Sri Lanka won by 3 wickets
Pukekura Park, New Plymouth, New Zealand
Umpires: Piloo Reporter (India) and Steve Woodward (New Zealand)
Player of the match: Andy Flower (Zimbabwe)

== Pakistan vs West Indies ==
23 February 1992
Scorecard

Pakistan; 220/2 (50 overs)	v	West Indies; 221/0 (46.5 overs)
Rameez Raja 102* (158); Roger Harper 1/33 (10 overs)		Desmond Haynes 93* (144); Wasim Akram 0/37 (10 overs)

West Indies won by 10 wickets
Melbourne Cricket Ground, Melbourne, Australia
Umpires: Steve Randell (Australia) and Ian Robinson (Zimbabwe)
Player of the match: Brian Lara (West Indies)

== Sri Lanka vs New Zealand ==
25 February 1992
Scorecard

Sri Lanka; 206/9 (50 overs)	v	New Zealand; 210/4 (48.2 overs)
Roshan Mahanama 80 (131); Willie Watson 3/37 (10 overs)		Ken Rutherford 65* (71); Ruwan Kalpage 2/33 (10 overs)

New Zealand won by 6 wickets
Trust Bank Park, Hamilton, New Zealand
Umpires: Piloo Reporter (India) and David Shepherd (England)
Player of the match: Ken Rutherford (New Zealand)

== Australia vs South Africa ==
26 February 1992
Scorecard

Australia; 170/9 (49 overs)	v	South Africa; 171/1 (46.5 overs)
David Boon 27 (31); Allan Donald 3/34 (10 overs)		Kepler Wessels 81* (148); Peter Taylor 1/32 (10 overs)

South Africa won by 9 wickets
Sydney Cricket Ground, Sydney, Australia
Umpires: Brian Aldridge (New Zealand) and Steve Bucknor (West Indies)
Player of the match: Kepler Wessels (South Africa)

This is South Africa first World Cup win

== Pakistan vs Zimbabwe ==
27 February 1992
Scorecard

Pakistan; 254/4 (50 overs)	v	Zimbabwe; 201/7 (50 overs)
Aamir Sohail 114 (136); Iain Butchart 3/57 (10 overs)		Andy Waller 44 (36); Wasim Akram 3/21 (10 overs)

Pakistan won by 53 runs
Bellerive Oval, Hobart, Australia
Umpires: Dooland Buultjens (Sri Lanka) and Steve Randell (Australia)
Player of the match: Aamir Sohail (Pakistan)

== West Indies vs England ==
27 February 1992
Scorecard

West Indies; 157 (49.2 overs)	v	England; 160/4 (39.5 overs)
Keith Arthurton 54 (101); Chris Lewis 3/30 (8.2 overs)		Graham Gooch 65 (101); Winston Benjamin 2/22 (9.5 overs)

England won by 6 wickets
Melbourne Cricket Ground, Melbourne, Australia
Umpires: Karl Liebenberg (South Africa) and Steve Woodward (New Zealand)
Player of the match: Chris Lewis (England)

== India vs Sri Lanka ==
28 February 1992
Scorecard

India; 1/0 (0.2 overs)	v	Sri Lanka

No result
Ray Mitchell Oval, Mackay, Australia
Umpires: Ian Robinson (Zimbabwe) and David Shepherd (England)

- The match was initially reduced to 20 overs a side due to rain. A helicopter was used to dry the pitch but as play began rain fell again, washing out the game.

== South Africa vs New Zealand ==
29 February 1992
Scorecard

South Africa; 190/7 (50 overs)	v	New Zealand; 191/3 (34.3 overs)
Peter Kirsten 90 (129); Willie Watson 2/30 (10 overs)		Mark Greatbatch 68 (60); Peter Kirsten 1/22 (7 overs)

New Zealand won by 7 wickets
Eden Park, Auckland, New Zealand
Umpires: Khizer Hayat (Pakistan) and Piloo Reporter (India)
Player of the match: Mark Greatbatch (New Zealand)

== West Indies vs Zimbabwe ==
29 February 1992
Scorecard

West Indies; 264/8 (50 overs)	v	Zimbabwe; 189/7 (50 overs)
Brian Lara 72 (71); Eddo Brandes 3/45 (10 overs)		Ali Shah 60* (87); Winston Benjamin 3/27 (10 overs)

West Indies won by 75 runs
Brisbane Cricket Ground, Brisbane, Australia
Umpires: Karl Liebenberg (South Africa) and Steve Woodward (New Zealand)
Player of the match: Brian Lara (West Indies)

== Australia vs India ==
1 March 1992
Scorecard

Australia; 237/9 (50 overs)	v	India; 234 (47 overs)
Dean Jones 90 (108); Kapil Dev 3/41 (10 overs)		Mohammed Azharuddin 93 (102); Tom Moody 3/56 (9 overs)

Australia won by 1 run (revised target)
Brisbane Cricket Ground, Brisbane, Australia
Umpires: Brian Aldridge (New Zealand) and Ian Robinson (Zimbabwe)
Player of the match: Dean Jones (Australia)

- Rain interrupted play after 16.2 overs in the Indian innings (45/1). India's target recalculated to 236 off 47 overs.

== Pakistan vs England ==
1 March 1992
Scorecard

Pakistan; 74 (40.2 overs)	v	England; 24/1 (8 overs)
Saleem Malik 17 (20); Derek Pringle 3/8 (8.2 overs)		Ian Botham 6* (22); Wasim Akram 1/7 (3 overs)

No result
Adelaide Oval, Adelaide, Australia
Umpires: Steve Bucknor (West Indies) and Peter McConnell (Australia)

== South Africa vs Sri Lanka ==
2 March 1992
Scorecard

South Africa; 195 (50 overs)	v	Sri Lanka; 198/7 (49.5 overs)
Peter Kirsten 47 (81); Don Anurasiri 3/41 (10 overs)		Roshan Mahanama 68 (121); Allan Donald 3/42 (9.5 overs)

Sri Lanka won by 3 wickets
Basin Reserve, Wellington, New Zealand
Umpires: Khizer Hayat (Pakistan) and Steve Woodward (New Zealand)
Player of the match: Arjuna Ranatunga (Sri Lanka)

== New Zealand vs Zimbabwe ==
3 March 1992
Scorecard

New Zealand; 162/3 (20.5 overs)	v	Zimbabwe; 105/7 (18 overs)
Martin Crowe 74* (43); Kevin Duers 1/17 (6 overs)		Andy Flower 30 (28); Chris Harris 3/15 (4 overs)

New Zealand won by 48 runs (revised target)
McLean Park, Napier, New Zealand
Umpires: Karl Liebenberg (South Africa) and Dooland Buultjens (Sri Lanka)
Player of the match: Martin Crowe (New Zealand)

- New Zealand innings interrupted at 9/1 (2.1 overs). Match reduced to 35 overs per side. Further interruption at 52/2 (11.2 ov). Match reduced to 24 overs per side. Innings ended by a third interruption after 20.5 overs. Zimbabwe set a target of 154 from 18 overs.

== India vs Pakistan ==
4 March 1992
Scorecard

India; 216/7 (49 overs)	v	Pakistan; 173 (48.1 overs)
Sachin Tendulkar 54* (62); Mushtaq Ahmed 3/59 (10 overs)		Aamir Sohail 62 (95); Manoj Prabhakar 2/22 (10 overs)

India won by 43 runs
Sydney Cricket Ground, Sydney, Australia
Umpires: Peter McConnell (Australia) and David Shepherd (England)
Player of the match: Sachin Tendulkar (India)

- Match reduced to 49 overs per side due to a slow over rate by Pakistan.

== South Africa vs West Indies ==
5 March 1992
Scorecard

South Africa; 200/8 (50 overs)	v	West Indies; 136 (38.4 overs)
Peter Kirsten 56 (91); Malcolm Marshall 2/26 (10 overs)		Gus Logie 61 (69); Meyrick Pringle 4/11 (8 overs)

South Africa won by 64 runs
Lancaster Park, Christchurch, New Zealand
Umpires: Brian Aldridge (New Zealand) and Steve Randell (Australia)
Player of the match: Meyrick Pringle (South Africa)

== Australia vs England ==
5 March 1992
Scorecard

Australia; 171 (49 overs)	v	England; 173/2 (40.5 overs)
Tom Moody 51 (88); Ian Botham 4/31 (10 overs)		Graham Gooch 58 (112); Mike Whitney 1/28 (10 overs)

England won by 8 wickets
Sydney Cricket Ground, Sydney, Australia
Umpires: Steve Bucknor (West Indies) and Khizer Hayat (Pakistan)
Player of the match: Ian Botham (England)

== India vs Zimbabwe ==
7 March 1992
Scorecard

India; 203/7 (32 overs)	v	Zimbabwe; 104/1 (19.1 overs)
Sachin Tendulkar 81 (88); John Traicos 3/35 (6 overs)		Andy Flower 43 (56); Sachin Tendulkar 1/35 (6 overs)

India won by 55 runs (revised target)
Trust Bank Park, Hamilton, New Zealand
Umpires: Dooland Buultjens (Sri Lanka) and Steve Randell (Australia)
Player of the match: Sachin Tendulkar (India)

- After rain forced the early close of the Indian innings, the target was recalculated to 159 runs in the 19 overs.
- Zimbabwe were eliminated as a result of this match.

== Sri Lanka vs Australia ==
7 March 1992
Scorecard

Sri Lanka; 189/9 (50 overs)	v	Australia; 190/3 (44 overs)
Aravinda de Silva 62 (83); Peter Taylor 2/34 (10 overs)		Geoff Marsh 60 (113); Pramodya Wickramasinghe 2/29 (10 overs)

Australia won by 7 wickets
Adelaide Oval, Adelaide, Australia
Umpires: Piloo Reporter (India) and Ian Robinson (Zimbabwe)
Player of the match: Tom Moody (Australia)

== West Indies vs New Zealand ==
8 March 1992
Scorecard

West Indies; 203/7 (50 overs)	v	New Zealand; 206/5 (48.3 overs)
Brian Lara 52 (81); Gavin Larsen 2/41 (10 overs)		Martin Crowe 81* (81); Winston Benjamin 2/34 (9.3 overs)

New Zealand won by 5 wickets
Eden Park, Auckland, New Zealand
Umpires: Karl Liebenberg (South Africa) and Peter McConnell (Australia)
Player of the match: Martin Crowe (New Zealand)

== South Africa vs Pakistan ==
8 March 1992
Scorecard

South Africa; 211/7 (50 overs)	v	Pakistan; 173/8 (36 overs)
Andrew Hudson 54 (77); Imran Khan 2/34 (10 overs)		Inzamam-ul-Haq 48 (44); Adrian Kuiper 3/40 (6 overs)

South Africa won by 20 runs (revised target)
Brisbane Cricket Ground, Brisbane, Australia
Umpires: Brian Aldridge (New Zealand) and Steve Bucknor (West Indies)
Player of the match: Andrew Hudson (South Africa)

- When Pakistan was 74/2 after 21.3 overs, rain halted the play for an hour and the target was revised to 194 in 36 overs.

== England vs Sri Lanka ==
9 March 1992
Scorecard

England; 280/9 (50 overs)	v	Sri Lanka; 174 (44 overs)
Neil Fairbrother 63 (70); Asanka Gurusinha 2/67 (10 overs)		Arjuna Ranatunga 36 (51); Chris Lewis 4/30 (8 overs)

England won by 106 runs
Eastern Oval, Ballarat, Australia
Umpires: Khizer Hayat (Pakistan) and Piloo Reporter (India)
Player of the match: Chris Lewis (England)

== India vs West Indies ==
10 March 1992
Scorecard

India; 197 (49.4 overs)	v	West Indies; 195/5 (40.2 overs)
Mohammed Azharuddin 61 (84); Anderson Cummins 4/33 (10 overs)		Keith Arthurton 58 (99); Javagal Srinath 2/23 (9 overs)

West Indies won by 5 wickets (revised target)
Basin Reserve, Wellington, New Zealand
Umpires: Steve Randell (Australia) and Steve Woodward (New Zealand)
Player of the match: Anderson Cummins (West Indies)

- New Zealand qualified for the semi-finals as a result of this match.

== Zimbabwe vs South Africa ==
10 March 1992
Scorecard

Zimbabwe; 163 (48.3 overs)	v	South Africa; 164/3 (45.2 overs)
Eddo Brandes 20 (28); Peter Kirsten 3/51 (5 overs)		Kepler Wessels 70 (137); Malcolm Jarvis 1/23 (9 overs)

South Africa won by 7 wickets
Manuka Oval, Canberra, Australia
Umpires: Steve Bucknor (West Indies) and David Shepherd (England)
Player of the match: Peter Kirsten (South Africa)

== Pakistan vs Australia ==
11 March 1992
Scorecard

Pakistan; 220/9 (50 overs)	v	Australia; 172 (45.2 overs)
Aamir Sohail 76 (104); Steve Waugh 3/36 (10 overs)		Dean Jones 47 (79); Aaqib Javed 3/21 (8 overs)

Pakistan won by 48 runs
WACA Ground, Perth, Australia
Umpires: Karl Liebenberg (South Africa) and Piloo Reporter (India)
Player of the match: Aamir Sohail (Pakistan)

== India vs New Zealand ==
12 March 1992
Scorecard

India; 230/6 (50 overs)	v	New Zealand; 231/6 (47.1 overs)
Sachin Tendulkar 84 (107); Chris Harris 3/55 (9 overs)		Mark Greatbatch 73 (77); Manoj Prabhakar 3/46 (10 overs)

New Zealand won by 4 wickets
Carisbrook, Dunedin, New Zealand
Umpires: Peter McConnell (Australia) and Ian Robinson (Zimbabwe)
Player of the match: Mark Greatbatch (New Zealand)

- India were eliminated as a result of this match.

== South Africa vs England ==
12 March 1992
Scorecard

South Africa; 236/4 (50 overs)	v	England; 226/7 (40.5 overs)
Kepler Wessels 85 (126); Graeme Hick 2/44 (8.2 overs)		Alec Stewart 77 (88); Richard Snell 3/42 (7.5 overs)

England won by 3 wickets (revised target)
Melbourne Cricket Ground, Melbourne, Australia
Umpires: Brian Aldridge (New Zealand) and Dooland Buultjens (Sri Lanka)
Player of the match: Alec Stewart (England)

- Rain disrupted play in England's innings for 43 minutes when they were 62/0 after 12.0 overs. The target was revised to 226 in 41 overs.

== West Indies vs Sri Lanka ==
13 March 1992
Scorecard

West Indies; 268/8 (50 overs)	v	Sri Lanka; 177/9 (50 overs)
Phil Simmons 110 (125); Chandika Hathurusingha 4/57 (8 overs)		Athula Samarasekera 40 (41); Carl Hooper 2/19 (10 overs)

West Indies won by 91 runs
Berri Oval, Berri, Australia
Umpires: David Shepherd (England) and Steve Woodward (New Zealand)
Player of the match: Phil Simmons (West Indies)

- Sri Lanka were eliminated as a result of this match.

== Australia vs Zimbabwe ==
14 March 1992
Scorecard

Australia; 265/6 (50 overs)	v	Zimbabwe; 137 (41.4 overs)
Mark Waugh 66* (39); John Traicos 1/30 (10 overs)		Eddo Brandes 23 (28); Peter Taylor 2/14 (3.4 overs)

Australia won by 128 runs
Bellerive Oval, Hobart, Australia
Umpires: Brian Aldridge (New Zealand) and Steve Bucknor (West Indies)
Player of the match: Steve Waugh (Australia)

== England vs New Zealand ==
15 March 1992
Scorecard

England; 200/8 (50 overs)	v	New Zealand; 201/3 (40.5 overs)
Graeme Hick 56 (70); Dipak Patel 2/26 (10 overs)		Andrew Jones 78 (113); Ian Botham 1/19 (4 overs)

New Zealand won by 7 wickets
Basin Reserve, Wellington, New Zealand
Umpires: Steve Randell (Australia) and Ian Robinson (Zimbabwe)
Player of the match: Andrew Jones (New Zealand)

== India vs South Africa ==
15 March 1992
Scorecard

India; 180/6 (30 overs)	v	South Africa; 181/4 (29.1 overs)
Mohammad Azharuddin 79 (77); Adrian Kuiper 2/28 (6 overs)		Peter Kirsten 84 (86); Manoj Prabhakar 1/33 (5.1 overs)

South Africa won by 6 wickets
Adelaide Oval, Adelaide, Australia
Umpires: Dooland Buultjens (Sri Lanka) and Khizer Hayat (Pakistan)
Player of the match: Peter Kirsten (South Africa)

- Rain reduced the match to 30 overs per side
- South Africa qualified for semi-finals as a result of this match.

== Sri Lanka vs Pakistan ==
15 March 1992
Scorecard

Sri Lanka; 212/6 (50 overs)	v	Pakistan; 216/6 (49.1 overs)
Aravinda de Silva 43 (56); Mushtaq Ahmed 2/43 (10 overs)		Javed Miandad 57 (84); Champaka Ramanayake 2/37 (10 overs)

Pakistan won by 4 wickets
WACA Ground, Perth, Australia
Umpires: Karl Liebenberg (South Africa) and Peter McConnell (Australia)
Player of the match: Javed Miandad (Pakistan)

== New Zealand vs Pakistan ==
18 March 1992
Scorecard

New Zealand; 166 (48.2 overs)	v	Pakistan; 167/3 (44.4 overs)
Mark Greatbatch 42 (67); Wasim Akram 4/32 (9.2 overs)		Rameez Raja 119* (155); Danny Morrison 3/42 (10 overs)

Pakistan won by 7 wickets
Lancaster Park, Christchurch, New Zealand
Umpires: Steve Bucknor (West Indies) and Steve Randell (Australia)
Player of the match: Mushtaq Ahmed (Pakistan)

- Pakistan qualified for the semi-finals and Australia were eliminated as a result of this match.

== Zimbabwe vs England ==
18 March 1992
Scorecard

Zimbabwe; 134 (46.1 overs)	v	England; 125 (49.1 overs)
David Houghton 29 (74); Ian Botham 3/23 (10 overs)		Alec Stewart 29 (96); Eddo Brandes 4/21 (10 overs)

Zimbabwe won by 9 runs
Lavington Sports Oval, Albury, Australia
Umpires: Brian Aldridge (New Zealand) and Khizer Hayat (Pakistan)
Player of the match: Eddo Brandes (Zimbabwe)

== Australia vs West Indies ==
18 March 1992
Scorecard

Australia; 216/6 (50 overs)	v	West Indies; 159 (42.4 overs)
David Boon 100 (147); Andy Cummins 3/38 (10 overs)		Brian Lara 70 (97); Mike Whitney 4/34 (10 overs)

Australia won by 57 runs
Melbourne Cricket Ground, Melbourne, Australia
Umpires: Piloo Reporter (India) and David Shepherd (England)
Player of the match: David Boon (Australia)

- West Indies were eliminated as a result of this match.
