= Pakistan at the Cricket World Cup =

Pakistani cricket team history at Cricket (Men's) World Cup Events

Pakistan cricket team won the World Cup in 1992 under the captaincy of Imran Khan. Pakistan have also been runners up at the 1999 Cricket World Cup where they lost to Australia in the Final. They have been Semi Finalists four times (1979, 1983, 1987 & 2011) and have also reached the Quarter Finals twice (1996 & 2015). Pakistan's historical win–loss record at the cricket world cup is 49–37, with 3 no results. Javed Miandad has appeared in six Cricket World Cups which is more than any other player from Pakistan.

== Overall record ==
=== By tournament ===
Year	Round	Position	Games	Won	Tied/No result	Lost	Captain
(England) 1975	Group stage	5/8	3	1	0	2	Asif Iqbal
(England) 1979	Semi-finals	3/8	4	2	0	2	Asif Iqbal
(England) (Wales) 1983	Semi-finals	4/8	7	3	0	4	Imran Khan
(India) (Pakistan) 1987	Semi-finals	4/8	7	5	0	2	Imran Khan
(Australia) (New Zealand) 1992	Champions	1/9	10	6	1	3	Imran Khan
(India) (Pakistan) (Sri Lanka) 1996	Quarter-finals	6/12	6	4	0	2	Wasim Akram
(England) (Wales) (Scotland) (Republic of Ireland) (Netherlands) 1999	Runners-up	2/12	10	6	0	4	Wasim Akram
(South Africa) (Zimbabwe) (Kenya) 2003	Group stage	10/14	6	2	1	3	Waqar Younis
(Cricket West Indies) 2007	Group stage	10/16	3	1	0	2	Inzamam-ul-Haq
(India) (Bangladesh) (Sri Lanka) 2011	Semi-finals	3/14	8	6	0	2	Shahid Afridi
(Australia) (New Zealand) 2015	Quarter-finals	6/14	7	4	0	3	Misbah-ul-Haq
(England) (Wales) 2019	Group stage	5/10	9	5	1	3	Sarfaraz Ahmed
(India) 2023	Group stage	5/10	9	4	0	5	Babar Azam
Total	Champions (1992)	1 title	89	49	3	37	

White: Group/round-robin stage

Light Brown: Quarter-finals/Super Six

Brown: Semi-finals

Silver: Runner-up

Gold: Champions

=== By opponent ===
Opponent	M	W	L	T	NR	Win %	First played
Afghanistan	2	1	1	0	0	50	29 June 2019
Australia	11	4	7	0	0	36.36	7 June 1975
Bangladesh	3	2	1	0	0	66.66	31 May 1999
Canada	2	2	0	0	0	100	9 June 1979
England	11	5	5	0	1	45.45	16 June 1979
India	8	0	8	0	0	0	4 March 1992
Ireland	2	1	1	0	0	50	17 March 2007
Kenya	1	1	0	0	0	100	23 February 2011
Namibia	1	1	0	0	0	100	16 February 2003
Netherlands	3	3	0	0	0	100	26 February 1996
New Zealand	10	8	2	0	0	80	11 June 1983
Scotland	1	1	0	0	0	100	20 May 1999
South Africa	6	2	4	0	0	33.33	8 March 1992
Sri Lanka	8	8	0	0	0	100	14 June 1975
United Arab Emirates	2	2	0	0	0	100	24 February 1996
West Indies	11	3	8	0	0	27.27	11 June 1975
Zimbabwe	6	5	0	0	1	100	27 February 1992
Total	89	49	37	0	3	55.68%	
Source: Cricinfo. Last updated: 16 June 2024.

== Pakistan at the 1975 World Cup ==
=== Group B ===
Pos	Team	Pld	W	L	T	NR	Pts	RR
1	West Indies	3	3	0	0	0	12	4.346
2	Australia	3	2	1	0	0	8	4.433
3	Pakistan	3	1	2	0	0	4	4.450
4	Sri Lanka	3	0	3	0	0	0	2.778

Source: ESPNcricinfo

7 June 1975
Scorecard

Australia; 278/7 (60 overs)	v	Pakistan; 205 (53 overs)
Ross Edwards 80* (94); Naseer Malik 2/37 (12 overs)		Majid Khan 65 (76); Dennis Lillee 5/34 (12 overs)

Australia won by 73 runs
Headingley, Leeds
Umpires: Bill Alley (Eng) and Tom Spencer (Eng)
Player of the match: Dennis Lillee (AUS)

- Australia won the toss and chose to bat
- Rick McCosker and Alan Turner (both Aus) and Naseer Malik (Pak) all made their ODI debuts.

11 June 1975
Scorecard

Pakistan; 266/7 (60 overs)	v	West Indies; 267/9 (59.4 overs)
Majid Khan 60 (108); Viv Richards 1/21 (4 overs)		Deryck Murray 61* (76); Sarfraz Nawaz 4/44 (12 overs)

West Indies won by 1 wicket
Edgbaston, Birmingham
Umpires: David Constant (Eng) and John Langridge (Eng)
Player of the match: Sarfraz Nawaz (Pak)

- Pakistan won the toss and chose to bat
- Javed Miandad and Pervez Mir (both Pak) and Gordon Greenidge (WI) all made their ODI debuts.

14 June 1975
Scorecard

Pakistan; 330/6 (60 overs)	v	Sri Lanka; 138 (50.1 overs)
Zaheer Abbas 97 (89); Tony Opatha 2/67 (12 overs)		Anura Tennekoon 30 (36); Imran Khan 3/15 (7.1 overs)

Pakistan won by 192 runs
Trent Bridge, Nottingham
Umpires: Arthur Jepson (Eng) and Tom Spencer (Eng)
Player of the match: Zaheer Abbas (Pak)

- Sri Lanka won the toss and chose to field
- Ajit de Silva (SL) made his ODI debut.

== Pakistan at the 1979 World Cup ==
=== Group A ===
Pos	Team	Pld	W	L	T	NR	Pts	RR
1	England	3	3	0	0	0	12	3.066
2	Pakistan	3	2	1	0	0	8	3.602
3	Australia	3	1	2	0	0	4	3.164
4	Canada	3	0	3	0	0	0	1.606

Source: ESPNcricinfo

9 June 1979
Scorecard

Canada; 139/9 (60 overs)	v	Pakistan; 140/2 (40.1 overs)
Glenroy Sealy 45 (110); Sarfraz Nawaz 3/26 (10 overs)		Sadiq Mohammad 57* (122); John Valentine 1/18 (9 overs)

Pakistan won by 8 wickets
Headingley, Leeds, England
Umpires: Dickie Bird and Alan Whitehead
Player of the match: Sadiq Mohammad

14 June 1979
Scorecard

Pakistan; 286/7 (60 overs)	v	Australia; 197 all out (57.1 overs)
Asif Iqbal 61 (57); Gary Cosier 3/54 (12 overs)		Andrew Hilditch 72 (129); Sikander Bakht 3/34 (11 overs)

Pakistan won by 89 runs
Trent Bridge, Nottingham, England
Umpires: Dickie Bird and Ken Palmer
Player of the match: Asif Iqbal

- Reserve day used; June 13 washed out

16 June 1979
Scorecard

England; 165/9 (60 overs)	v	Pakistan; 151 all out (56 overs)
Graham Gooch 33 (90); Majid Khan 3/27 (12 overs)		Asif Iqbal 51 (104); Mike Hendrick 4/15 (12 overs)

England won by 14 runs
Headingley, Leeds, England
Umpires: Lloyd Budd and David Evans
Player of the match: Mike Hendrick

=== Semi-final ===
June 20, 1979
Scorecard

West Indies; 293/6 (60 overs)	v	Pakistan; 250 all out (56.2 overs)
Gordon Greenidge 73 (107); Asif Iqbal 4/56 (11 overs)		Zaheer Abbas 93 (122); Colin Croft 3/29 (11 overs)

West Indies won by 43 runs
The Oval, London, England
Umpires: Lloyd Budd and David Constant
Player of the match: Gordon Greenidge

== Pakistan at the 1983 World Cup ==
=== Group A ===
Pos	Team	Pld	W	L	T	NR	Pts	RR
1	England	6	5	1	0	0	20	4.671
2	Pakistan	6	3	3	0	0	12	4.014
3	New Zealand	6	3	3	0	0	12	3.927
4	Sri Lanka	6	1	5	0	0	4	3.752

Source: ESPNcricinfo

9 June 1983
Scorecard

Pakistan; 338/5 (60 overs)	v	Sri Lanka; 288/9 (60 overs)
Zaheer Abbas 82 (81); Ashantha de Mel 2/69 (12 overs)		Brendon Kuruppu 72 (101); Sarfraz Nawaz 3/40 (12 overs)

Pakistan won by 50 runs
St Helen's, Swansea, Wales
Umpires: Ken Palmer and David Shepherd
Player of the match: Mohsin Khan

11 June 1983
Scorecard

New Zealand; 238/9 (60 overs)	v	Pakistan; 186 (55.2 overs)
Bruce Edgar 44 (107); Abdul Qadir 4/21 (12 overs)		Abdul Qadir 41* (68); Richard Hadlee 3/20 (9 overs)

New Zealand won by 52 runs
Edgbaston, Birmingham, England
Umpires: Dickie Bird and Barrie Leadbeater
Player of the match: Abdul Qadir

- Reserve day on 12 June used, 56 overs of New Zealand's innings completed on 11 June.

13 June 1983
Scorecard

Pakistan; 193/8 (60 overs)	v	England; 199/2 (50.4 overs)
Zaheer Abbas 83 (104); Bob Willis 2/24 (12 overs)		Graeme Fowler 78* (151); Rashid Khan 1/19 (7 overs)

England won by 8 wickets
Lord's, London, England
Umpires: Barrie Meyer and Alan Whitehead
Player of the match: Zaheer Abbas

16 June 1983
Scorecard

Pakistan; 235/7 (60 overs)	v	Sri Lanka; 224 (58.3 overs)
Imran Khan 102* (133); Ashantha de Mel 5/39 (12 overs)		Sidath Wettimuny 50 (127); Abdul Qadir 5/44 (12 overs)

Pakistan won by 11 runs
Headingley, Leeds, England
Umpires: Don Oslear and Alan Whitehead
Player of the match: Abdul Qadir

18 June 1983
Scorecard

Pakistan; 232/8 (60 overs)	v	England; 233/3 (57.2 overs)
Javed Miandad 67 (100); Vic Marks 2/45 (12 overs)		Graeme Fowler 69 (96); Mudassar Nazar 2/34 (12 overs)

England won by 7 wickets
Old Trafford, Manchester, England
Umpires: Dickie Bird and Don Oslear
Player of the match: Graeme Fowler

20 June 1983
Scorecard

Pakistan; 261/3 (60 overs)	v	New Zealand; 250 (59.1 overs)
Zaheer Abbas 103* (121); Jeremy Coney 2/42 (12 overs)		Jeremy Coney 51 (78); Mudassar Nazar 3/43 (12 overs)

Pakistan won by 11 runs
Trent Bridge, Nottingham, England
Umpires: David Evans and Mervyn Kitchen
Player of the match: Imran Khan

=== Semi-final ===
22 June 1983
scorecard

Pakistan; 184/8 (60 overs)	v	West Indies; 188/2 (48.4 overs)

West Indies won by 8 wickets
The Oval, London

== Pakistan at the 1987 World Cup ==
Pakistan were the favourites going into the 1987 World Cup.

=== Group B ===
Pos	Team	Pld	W	L	T	NR	Pts	RR
1	Pakistan	6	5	1	0	0	20	5.007
2	England	6	4	2	0	0	16	5.140
3	West Indies	6	3	3	0	0	12	5.160
4	Sri Lanka	6	0	6	0	0	0	4.041

Source: ESPNcricinfo, The Age

8 October 1987
Scorecard

Pakistan; 267/6 (50 overs)	v	Sri Lanka; 252 (49.2 overs)
Javed Miandad 103 (100); Ravi Ratnayeke 2/47 (9 overs)		Roshan Mahanama 89 (117); Abdul Qadir 2/30 (10 overs)

Pakistan won by 15 runs
Niaz Stadium, Hyderabad, Pakistan
Umpires: V. K. Ramaswamy (India) and Steve Woodward (New Zealand)
Player of the match: Javed Miandad (Pakistan)

12 October 1987
Scorecard

Pakistan; 239/7 (50 overs)	v	England; 221 (48.4 overs)
Saleem Malik 65 (80); Phillip DeFreitas 3/42 (10 overs)		Mike Gatting 43 (47); Abdul Qadir 4/31 (10 overs)

Pakistan won by 18 runs
Pindi Club Ground, Rawalpindi, Pakistan
Umpires: Tony Crafter (Australia) and Ram Gupta (India)
Player of the match: Abdul Qadir (Pakistan)

- Play was abandoned due to rain on 12 October. Reserve day on 13 October used.

16 October 1987
Scorecard

West Indies; 216 (50 overs)	v	Pakistan; 217/9 (50 overs)
Phil Simmons 50 (57); Imran Khan 4/37 (8.3 overs)		Saleem Yousuf 56 (49); Courtney Walsh 4/40 (10 overs)

Pakistan won by 1 wicket
Gaddafi Stadium, Lahore, Pakistan
Umpires: V. K. Ramaswamy (India) and Steve Woodward (New Zealand)
Player of the match: Saleem Yousuf (Pakistan)

20 October 1987
Scorecard

England; 244/9 (50 overs)	v	Pakistan; 247/3 (49 overs)
Bill Athey 86 (104); Imran Khan 4/37 (9 overs)		Rameez Raja 113 (148); John Emburey 1/34 (10 overs)

Pakistan won by 7 wickets
National Stadium, Karachi, Pakistan
Umpires: Tony Crafter (Australia) and V. K. Ramaswamy (India)
Player of the match: Imran Khan (Pakistan)

25 October 1987
Scorecard

Pakistan; 297/7 (50 overs)	v	Sri Lanka; 184/8 (50 overs)
Saleem Malik 100 (95); Aravinda de Silva 1/37 (6 overs)		Duleep Mendis 58 (65); Abdul Qadir 3/40 (10 overs)

Pakistan won by 113 runs
Iqbal Stadium, Faisalabad, Pakistan
Umpires: Ram Gupta (India) and Steve Woodward (New Zealand)
Player of the match: Saleem Malik (Pakistan)

30 October 1987
Scorecard

West Indies; 258/7 (50 overs)	v	Pakistan; 230/9 (50 overs)
Richie Richardson 110 (135); Wasim Akram 3/45 (10 overs)		Rameez Raja 70 (111); Patrick Patterson 3/34 (10 overs)

West Indies won by 28 runs
National Stadium, Karachi, Pakistan
Umpires: Ram Gupta and V. K. Ramaswamy (both India)
Player of the match: Richie Richardson (West Indies)

=== Semi-final ===
4 November 1987
Scorecard

Australia; 267/6 (50 overs)	v	Pakistan; 249 (49.2 overs)
David Boon 65 (91); Imran Khan 3/36 (10 overs)		Javed Miandad 70 (103); Craig McDermott 5/44 (10 overs)

Australia won by 18 runs
Gaddafi Stadium, Lahore, Pakistan
Umpires: Dickie Bird and David Shepherd (Both England)
Player of the match: Craig McDermott (Australia)

== Pakistan at the 1992 World Cup ==
=== Points table ===
Team	Pts	Pld	W	L	NR	T	RD	RR
New Zealand	14	8	7	1	0	0	0.59	4.76
England	11	8	5	2	1	0	0.47	4.36
South Africa	10	8	5	3	0	0	0.14	4.36
Pakistan	9	8	4	3	1	0	0.17	4.33
Australia	8	8	4	4	0	0	0.20	4.22
West Indies	8	8	4	4	0	0	0.07	4.14
India	5	8	2	5	1	0	0.14	4.95
Sri Lanka	5	8	2	5	1	0	−0.68	4.21
Zimbabwe	2	8	1	7	0	0	−1.14	4.03

Teams qualified for knockout stage and final

=== Tournament progression ===
	Round-robin stage								Knockout	
Team	1	2	3	4	5	6	7	8	SF	F
Australia	0	0	2	2	4	4	6	8		
England	2	4	5	7	9	11	11	11	W	L
India	0	1	1	3	5	5	5	5		
New Zealand	2	4	6	8	10	12	14	14	L	
Pakistan	0	2	3	3	3	5	7	9	W	W
South Africa	2	2	2	4	6	8	8	10	L	
Sri Lanka	2	2	3	5	5	5	5	5		
West Indies	2	2	4	4	4	6	8	8		
Zimbabwe	0	0	0	0	0	0	0	2		

Won	Lost	No result

Note: The total points at the end of each group match are listed.
Note: Click on the points (group matches) or W/L (knockout) to see the match summary.

23 February 1992
Scorecard

Pakistan; 220/2 (50 overs)	v	West Indies; 221/0 (46.5 overs)
Rameez Raja 102* (158); Roger Harper 1/33 (10 overs)		Desmond Haynes 93* (144); Wasim Akram 0/37 (10 overs)

West Indies won by 10 wickets
Melbourne Cricket Ground, Melbourne, Australia
Umpires: Steve Randell (Australia) and Ian Robinson (Zimbabwe)
Player of the match: Brian Lara (West Indies)

27 February 1992
Scorecard

Pakistan; 254/4 (50 overs)	v	Zimbabwe; 201/7 (50 overs)
Aamir Sohail 114 (136); Iain Butchart 3/57 (10 overs)		Andy Waller 44 (36); Wasim Akram 3/21 (10 overs)

Pakistan won by 53 runs
Bellerive Oval, Hobart, Australia
Umpires: Dooland Buultjens (Sri Lanka) and Steve Randell (Australia)
Player of the match: Aamir Sohail (Pakistan)

1 March 1992
Scorecard

Pakistan; 74 (40.2 overs)	v	England; 24/1 (8 overs)
Saleem Malik 17 (20); Derek Pringle 3/8 (8.2 overs)		Ian Botham 6* (22); Wasim Akram 1/7 (3 overs)

No result
Adelaide Oval, Adelaide, Australia
Umpires: Steve Bucknor (West Indies) and Peter McConnell (Australia)

4 March 1992
Scorecard

India; 216/7 (49 overs)	v	Pakistan; 173 (48.1 overs)
Sachin Tendulkar 54* (62); Mushtaq Ahmed 3/59 (10 overs)		Aamir Sohail 62 (95); Manoj Prabhakar 2/22 (10 overs)

India won by 43 runs
Sydney Cricket Ground, Sydney, Australia
Umpires: Peter McConnell (Australia) and David Shepherd (England)
Player of the match: Sachin Tendulkar (India)

- Match reduced to 49 overs per side due to a slow over rate by Pakistan.

8 March 1992
Scorecard

South Africa; 211/7 (50 overs)	v	Pakistan; 173/8 (36 overs)
Andrew Hudson 54 (77); Imran Khan 2/34 (10 overs)		Inzamam-ul-Haq 48 (44); Adrian Kuiper 3/40 (6 overs)

South Africa won by 20 runs (revised target)
Brisbane Cricket Ground, Brisbane, Australia
Umpires: Brian Aldridge (New Zealand) and Steve Bucknor (West Indies)
Player of the match: Andrew Hudson (South Africa)

- When Pakistan was 74/2 after 21.3 overs, rain halted the play for an hour and the target was revised to 194 in 36 overs.

11 March 1992
Scorecard

Pakistan; 220/9 (50 overs)	v	Australia; 172 (45.2 overs)
Aamir Sohail 76 (104); Steve Waugh 3/36 (10 overs)		Dean Jones 47 (79); Aaqib Javed 3/21 (8 overs)

Pakistan won by 48 runs
WACA Ground, Perth, Australia
Umpires: Karl Liebenberg (South Africa) and Piloo Reporter (India)
Player of the match: Aamir Sohail (Pakistan)

15 March 1992
Scorecard

Sri Lanka; 212/6 (50 overs)	v	Pakistan; 216/6 (49.1 overs)
Aravinda de Silva 43 (56); Mushtaq Ahmed 2/43 (10 overs)		Javed Miandad 57 (84); Champaka Ramanayake 2/37 (10 overs)

Pakistan won by 4 wickets
WACA Ground, Perth, Australia
Umpires: Karl Liebenberg (South Africa) and Peter McConnell (Australia)
Player of the match: Javed Miandad (Pakistan)

18 March 1992
Scorecard

New Zealand; 166 (48.2 overs)	v	Pakistan; 167/3 (44.4 overs)
Mark Greatbatch 42 (67); Wasim Akram 4/32 (9.2 overs)		Rameez Raja 119* (155); Danny Morrison 3/42 (10 overs)

Pakistan won by 7 wickets
Lancaster Park, Christchurch, New Zealand
Umpires: Steve Bucknor (West Indies) and Steve Randell (Australia)
Player of the match: Mushtaq Ahmed (Pakistan)

- Pakistan qualified for the semi-finals and Australia were eliminated as a result of this match.

=== Semi-final ===
21 March 1992
Scorecard

New Zealand; 262/7 (50 overs)	v	Pakistan; 264/6 (49 overs)
Martin Crowe 91 (83); Wasim Akram 2/40 (10 overs); Mushtaq Ahmed 2/40 (10 overs)		Inzamam-ul-Haq 60 (37); Willie Watson 2/39 (10 overs)

Pakistan won by 4 wickets
Eden Park, Auckland, New Zealand
Umpires: Steve Bucknor and David Shepherd
Player of the match: Inzamam-ul-Haq (Pak)

=== Final ===
25 March 1992
Scorecard

Pakistan; 249/6 (50 overs)	v	England; 227 (49.2 overs)
Imran Khan 72 (110); Derek Pringle 3/22 (10 overs)		Neil Fairbrother 62 (70); Mushtaq Ahmed 3/41 (10 overs)

Pakistan won by 22 runs
Melbourne Cricket Ground, Melbourne, Australia
Umpires: Brian Aldridge and Steve Bucknor
Player of the match: Wasim Akram (Pak)

- This was Imran Khan's last ODI.

== Pakistan at the 1996 World Cup ==
=== Group B ===
Pos	Team	Pld	W	L	T	NR	Pts	NRR
1	South Africa	5	5	0	0	0	10	2.043
2	Pakistan	5	4	1	0	0	8	0.961
3	New Zealand	5	3	2	0	0	6	0.552
4	England	5	2	3	0	0	4	0.079
5	United Arab Emirates	5	1	4	0	0	2	−1.830
6	Netherlands	5	0	5	0	0	0	−1.923

Source: ESPNcricinfo

24 February
Scorecard

United Arab Emirates; 109/9 (33 overs)	v	Pakistan; 112/1 (18 overs)
Shaukat Dukanwala 21* (19); Mushtaq Ahmed 3/16 (7 overs)		Ijaz Ahmed 50* (57); Johanne Samarasekera 1/17 (3 overs)

Pakistan won by 9 wickets
Jinnah Stadium, Gujranwala
Umpires: B. C. Cooray and Srinivasaraghavan Venkataraghavan
Player of the match: Mushtaq Ahmed (Pak)

26 February
Scorecard

Netherlands; 145/7 (50 overs)	v	Pakistan; 151/2 (30.4 overs)
Flavian Aponso 58; Waqar Younis 4/26		Saeed Anwar 83*; Peter Cantrell 1/18 (4 overs)

Pakistan won by 8 wickets
Gaddafi Stadium, Lahore
Umpires: K. T. Francis and Steve Bucknor
Player of the match: Waqar Younis (Pak)

29 February
Scorecard

Pakistan; 242/6 (50 overs)	v	South Africa; 243/5 (44.2 overs)
Aamir Sohail 111 (139); Hansie Cronje 2/20 (5 overs)		Daryll Cullinan 65 (76); Waqar Younis 3/50 (8 overs)

South Africa won by 5 wickets
National Stadium, Karachi
Umpires: K. T. Francis and Steve Bucknor
Player of the match: Hansie Cronje (SA)

- Bucknor replaced Ian Robinson as an umpire in this match after protests by Pakistan.

3 March
Scorecard

England; 249/9 (50 overs)	v	Pakistan; 250/3 (47.4 overs)
Robin Smith 75 (92); Mushtaq Ahmed 3/53 (10 overs)		Saeed Anwar 71 (72); Dominic Cork 2/59 (10 overs)

Pakistan won by 7 wickets
National Stadium, Karachi
Umpires: B. C. Cooray and Srinivasaraghavan Venkataraghavan
Player of the match: Aamer Sohail (Pak)

6 March
Scorecard

Pakistan; 281/5 (50 overs)	v	New Zealand; 235 (47.3 overs)
Saeed Anwar 62 (67); Robert Kennedy 1/32 (5 overs)		Stephen Fleming 42 (43); Mushtaq Ahmed 2/32 (10 overs)

Pakistan won by 46 runs
Gaddafi Stadium, Lahore
Umpires: K. T. Francis and Ian Robinson
Player of the match: Saleem Malik (Pak)

=== Quarter-final ===
9 March
Scorecard

India; 287/8 (50 overs)	v	Pakistan; 248/9 (49 overs)
Navjot Sidhu 93 (115); Mushtaq Ahmed 2/56 (10 overs)		Aamer Sohail 55 (46); Venkatesh Prasad 3/45 (10 overs)

India won by 39 runs
M Chinnaswamy Stadium, Bangalore
Umpires: Steve Bucknor and David Shepherd
Player of the match: Navjot Sidhu (Ind)

- Pakistan was fined 1 over for a slow over rate.
- This was last ODI for Javed Miandad (Pak)

== Pakistan at the 1999 World Cup ==
=== Group B ===
Team	Pld	W	L	NR	T	NRR	Pts	PCF
Pakistan	5	4	1	0	0	0.51	8	4
Australia	5	3	2	0	0	0.73	6	0
New Zealand	5	3	2	0	0	0.58	6	2
West Indies	5	3	2	0	0	0.50	6	N/A
Bangladesh	5	2	3	0	0	−0.52	4	N/A
Scotland	5	0	5	0	0	−1.93	0	N/A

16 May 1999
Scorecard

Pakistan; 229/8 (50 overs)	v	West Indies; 202 (48.5 overs)
Wasim Akram 43 (29); Courtney Walsh 3/28 (10 overs)		Shivnarine Chanderpaul 77 (96); Abdul Razzaq 3/32 (10 overs)

Pakistan won by 27 runs
County Ground, Bristol, England
Umpires: Darrell Hair (Aus) and Dave Orchard (SA)
Player of the match: Azhar Mahmood (Pak)

20 May 1999
Scorecard

Pakistan; 261/6 (50 overs)	v	Scotland; 167 (38.5 overs)
Yousuf Youhana 81* (119); Gavin Hamilton 2/36 (10 overs)		Gavin Hamilton 76 (111); Shoaib Akhtar 3/11 (6 overs)

Pakistan won by 94 runs
Riverside Ground, Chester-le-Street, England
Umpires: Doug Cowie (NZ) and Ian Robinson (Zim)
Player of the match: Yousuf Youhana (Pak)

- Scotland conceded 59 extras, the joint highest in an ODI.

23 May 1999
Scorecard

Pakistan; 275/8 (50 overs)	v	Australia; 265 (49.5 overs)
Inzamam-ul-Haq 81 (104); Damien Fleming 2/37 (10 overs)		Michael Bevan 61 (80); Wasim Akram 4/40 (9.5 overs)

Pakistan won by 10 runs
Headingley, Leeds, England
Umpires: Rudi Koertzen (SA) and Peter Willey (Eng)
Player of the match: Inzamam-ul-Haq (Pak)

28 May 1999
Scorecard

Pakistan; 269/8 (50 overs)	v	New Zealand; 207/8 (50 overs)
Inzamam-ul-Haq 73* (61); Geoff Allott 4/64 (10 overs)		Stephen Fleming 69 (100); Azhar Mahmood 3/38 (10 overs)

Pakistan won by 62 runs
County Ground, Derby, England
Umpires: KT Francis (SL) and Rudi Koertzen (SA)
Player of the match: Inzamam-ul-Haq (Pak)

- Pakistan qualified for Super Six stage

31 May 1999
Scorecard

Bangladesh; 223/9 (50 overs)	v	Pakistan; 161 (44.3 overs)
Akram Khan 42 (66); Saqlain Mushtaq 5/35 (10 overs)		Wasim Akram 29 (52); Khaled Mahmud 3/31 (10 overs)

Bangladesh won by 62 runs
County Ground, Northampton, England
Umpires: Doug Cowie (NZ) and Darrell Hair (Aus)
Player of the match: Khaled Mahmud (Ban)

=== Super Six ===
Teams who qualified for the Super Six stage only played against the teams from the other group; results against the other teams from the same group were carried forward to this stage. As a result, Pakistan carried forward 4 points from the group stage, with their wins against Australia and New Zealand. Results against the non-qualifying teams were therefore discarded at this point.

Team	Pld	W	L	NR	T	NRR	Pts	PCF
Pakistan	5	3	2	0	0	0.65	6	4
Australia	5	3	2	0	0	0.36	6	0
South Africa	5	3	2	0	0	0.17	6	2
New Zealand	5	2	2	1	0	−0.52	5	2
Zimbabwe	5	2	2	1	0	−0.79	5	4
India	5	1	4	0	0	−0.15	2	0
Source:Cricinfo

5 June 1999
Scorecard

Pakistan; 220/7 (50 overs)	v	South Africa; 221/7 (49 overs)
Moin Khan 63 (56); Steve Elworthy 2/23 (10 overs)		Jacques Kallis 54 (98); Azhar Mahmood 3/24 (10 overs)

South Africa won by 3 wickets
Trent Bridge, Nottingham, England
Umpires: Darrell Hair (Aus) and David Shepherd (Eng)
Player of the match: Lance Klusener (SA)

8 June 1999
Scorecard

India; 227/6 (50 overs)	v	Pakistan; 180 (45.3 overs)
Rahul Dravid 61 (89); Wasim Akram 2/27 (10 overs)		Inzamam-Ul-Haq 41 (93); Venkatesh Prasad 5/27 (9.3 overs)

India won by 47 runs
Old Trafford, Manchester, England
Umpires: Steve Bucknor (WI) and David Shepherd (Eng)
Player of the match: Venkatesh Prasad (Ind)

11 June 1999
Scorecard

Pakistan; 271/9 (50 overs)	v	Zimbabwe; 123 (40.3 overs)
Saeed Anwar 103 (144); Henry Olonga 2/38 (5 overs)		Neil Johnson 54 (94); Saqlain Mushtaq 3/16 (6.3 overs)

Pakistan won by 148 runs
The Oval, London, England
Umpires: Steve Bucknor (WI) and Dave Orchard (SA)
Player of the match: Saeed Anwar (Pak)

- Pakistan qualified for Semi-finals. Saqlain Mushtaq (Pak) became the second bowler to take a hat-trick in a World Cup match.

=== Semi-final ===
16 June 1999
Scorecard

New Zealand; 241/7 (50 overs)	v	Pakistan; 242/1 (47.3 overs)
Roger Twose 46 (83); Shoaib Akhtar 3/55 (10 overs)		Saeed Anwar 113* (148); Chris Cairns 1/33 (8 overs)

Pakistan won by 9 wickets
Old Trafford, Manchester, England
Umpires: Darrell Hair (Aus) and Peter Willey (Eng)
Player of the match: Shoaib Akhtar (Pak)

=== Final ===
20 June 1999
Scorecard

Pakistan; 132 (39 overs)	v	Australia; 133/2 (20.1 overs)
Ijaz Ahmed 22 (46); Shane Warne 4/33 (9 overs)		Adam Gilchrist 54 (36); Saqlain Mushtaq 1/21 (4.1 overs)

Australia won by 8 wickets
Lord's, London, England
Umpires: Steve Bucknor (WI) and David Shepherd (Eng)
Player of the match: Shane Warne (Aus)

== Pakistan at the 2003 World Cup ==
=== Pool A ===
Team	Pld	W	L	NR	T	NRR	Pts	PCF
Australia	6	6	0	0	0	2.05	24	12
India	6	5	1	0	0	1.11	20	8
Zimbabwe	6	3	2	1	0	0.50	14	3.5
England	6	3	3	0	0	0.82	12	–
Pakistan	6	2	3	1	0	0.23	10	–
Netherlands	6	1	5	0	0	−1.45	4	–
Namibia	6	0	6	0	0	−2.96	0	–

11 February 2003
Scorecard

Australia; 310/8 (50 overs)	v	Pakistan; 228 (44.3 overs)

Australia won by 82 runs
Wanderers Stadium, Johannesburg, South Africa

16 February 2003
Scorecard

Pakistan; 255/9 (50 overs)	v	Namibia; 84 (17.4 overs)

Pakistan won by 171 runs
De Beers Diamond Oval, Kimberley, South Africa

22 February 2003
Scorecard

England; 246/8 (50 overs)	v	Pakistan; 134 (31 overs)

England won by 112 runs
Newlands Cricket Ground, Cape Town, South Africa

25 February 2003
Scorecard

Pakistan; 253/9 (50 overs)	v	Netherlands; 156 (39.3 overs)

Pakistan won by 97 runs
Boland Park, Paarl, South Africa

1 March 2003
Scorecard

Pakistan; 273/7 (50 overs)	v	India; 276/4 (45.4 overs)

India won by 6 wickets
Centurion Park, Centurion, South Africa

4 March 2003
Scorecard

Pakistan; 73/3 (14 overs)	v	Zimbabwe

No result
Queens Sports Club, Bulawayo, Zimbabwe

== Pakistan at the 2007 World Cup ==
=== Group D ===
Pos	Team	Pld	W	L	T	NR	Pts	NRR
1	West Indies	3	3	0	0	0	6	0.764
2	Ireland	3	1	1	1	0	3	−0.092
3	Pakistan	3	1	2	0	0	2	0.089
4	Zimbabwe	3	0	2	1	0	1	−0.886

Source: ESPNcricinfo

13 March 2007
Scorecard

West Indies; 241/9 (50 overs)	v	Pakistan; 187 (47.2 overs)

West Indies won by 54 runs
Sabina Park, Kingston, Jamaica

17 March 2007
Scorecard

Pakistan; 132 (45.4 overs)	v	Ireland; 133/7 (41.4 overs)

Ireland won by 3 wickets (D/L)
Sabina Park, Kingston, Jamaica

21 March 2007
Scorecard

Pakistan; 349 (49.5 overs)	v	Zimbabwe; 99 (19.1 overs)

Pakistan won by 93 runs (D/L)
Sabina Park, Kingston, Jamaica

== Pakistan at the 2011 World Cup ==
=== Group A ===
Pos	Team	Pld	W	L	T	NR	Pts	NRR
1	Pakistan	6	5	1	0	0	10	0.758
2	Sri Lanka	6	4	1	0	1	9	2.582
3	Australia	6	4	1	0	1	9	1.123
4	New Zealand	6	4	2	0	0	8	1.135
5	Zimbabwe	6	2	4	0	0	4	0.030
6	Canada	6	1	5	0	0	2	−1.987
7	Kenya	6	0	6	0	0	0	−3.042

Source: ESPNcricinfo

23 February 2011
14:30 (D/N)
Scorecard

Pakistan; 317/7 (50 overs)	v	Kenya; 112 (33.1 overs)
Umar Akmal 71 (52); Thomas Odoyo 3/41 (7 overs)		Collins Obuya 47 (58); Shahid Afridi 5/16 (8 overs)

Pakistan won by 205 runs
Mahinda Rajapaksa International Cricket Stadium, Sooriyawewa
Umpires: Tony Hill (NZ) and Nigel Llong (Eng)
Player of the match: Umar Akmal (Pak)

- Pakistan won the toss and elected to bat.

26 February 2011
14:30 (D/N)
Scorecard

Pakistan; 277/7 (50 overs)	v	Sri Lanka; 266/9 (50 overs)
Misbah-ul-Haq 83* (91); Rangana Herath 2/46 (10 overs)		Chamara Silva 57 (78); Shahid Afridi 4/34 (10 overs)

Pakistan won by 11 runs
R. Premadasa Stadium, Colombo
Umpires: Ian Gould (Eng) and Daryl Harper (Aus)
Player of the match: Shahid Afridi (Pak)

- Pakistan won the toss and elected to bat.

3 March 2011
14:30 (D/N)
Scorecard

Pakistan; 184 (43 overs)	v	Canada; 138 (42.5 overs)
Umar Akmal 48 (68); Harvir Baidwan 3/35 (8 overs)		Jimmy Hansra 43 (75); Shahid Afridi 5/23 (10 overs)

Pakistan won by 46 runs
R. Premadasa Stadium, Colombo
Umpires: Daryl Harper (Aus) and Nigel Llong (Eng)
Player of the match: Shahid Afridi (Pak)

- Pakistan won the toss and elected to bat.
- Shahid Afridi, who was named man of the match, set a new record of becoming the first player in World Cup matches to take four or more wickets in three consecutive games.

8 March 2011
14:30 (D/N)
Scorecard

New Zealand; 302/7 (50 overs)	v	Pakistan; 192 (41.1 overs)
Ross Taylor 131* (124); Umar Gul 3/32 (10 overs)		Abdul Razzaq 62 (74); Tim Southee 3/25 (8 overs)

New Zealand won by 110 runs.
Pallekele International Cricket Stadium, Kandy
Umpires: Daryl Harper (Aus) and Nigel Llong (Eng)
Player of the match: Ross Taylor (NZ)

- New Zealand won the toss and elected to bat.

14 March 2011
14:30 (D/N)
Scorecard

Zimbabwe; 151/7 (39.4 overs)	v	Pakistan; 164/3 (34.1 overs)
Craig Ervine 52 (82); Umar Gul 3/36 (7.4 overs)		Asad Shafiq 78* (97); Ray Price 2/21 (8 overs)

Pakistan won by 7 wickets
Pallekele International Cricket Stadium, Kandy
Umpires: Tony Hill (NZ) and Nigel Llong (Eng)
Player of the match: Umar Gul (Pak)

- Zimbabwe won the toss and elected to bat.
- Rain reduced the game. Zimbabwe made 151/7 in 39.4 overs; so the target for Pakistan was 162 in 38 overs

19 March 2011
14:30 (D/N)
Scorecard

Australia; 176 (46.4 overs)	v	Pakistan; 178/6 (41 overs)
Brad Haddin 42 (80); Umar Gul 3/30 (7.4 overs)		Asad Shafiq 46 (81); Brett Lee 4/28 (8 overs)

Pakistan won by 4 wickets
R. Premadasa Stadium, Colombo
Umpires: Marais Erasmus (SA) and Tony Hill (NZ)
Player of the match: Umar Akmal (Pak)

- Australia won the toss and elected to bat.
- The loss was Australia's first loss in a World Cup match since 23 May 1999, when Pakistan defeated Australia at Headingley in the group stage of the 1999 World Cup. This ended a 34-match unbeaten streak (including 32 wins, a tie and a no-result).

=== Quarter-final ===
23 March 2011
14:30 (D/N)
Scorecard

West Indies; 112 (43.3 overs)	v	Pakistan; 113/0 (20.5 overs)
Shivnarine Chanderpaul 44* (106); Shahid Afridi 4/30 (9.3 overs)		Mohammad Hafeez 61* (64)

Pakistan won by 10 wickets
Sher-e-Bangla National Cricket Stadium, Dhaka
Umpires: Billy Bowden (NZ) and Steve Davis (Aus)
Player of the match: Mohammad Hafeez (Pak)

- West Indies won the toss and elected to bat.

=== Semi-final ===
30 March 2011
14:30 (D/N)
Scorecard

India; 260/9 (50 overs)	v	Pakistan; 231 (49.5 overs)
Sachin Tendulkar 85 (115); Wahab Riaz 5/46 (10 overs)		Misbah-ul-Haq 56 (76); Ashish Nehra 2/33 (10 overs)

INDIA won by 29 runs
Punjab Cricket Association IS Bindra Stadium, Mohali
Umpires: Ian Gould (Eng) and Simon Taufel (Aus)
Player of the match: Wahab Riaz (pak)

- India won the toss and elected to bat

== Pakistan at the 2015 World Cup ==
=== Pool B ===
Pos	Team	Pld	W	L	T	NR	Pts	NRR
1	India	6	6	0	0	0	12	1.827
2	South Africa	6	4	2	0	0	8	1.707
3	Pakistan	6	4	2	0	0	8	−0.085
4	West Indies	6	3	3	0	0	6	−0.053
5	Ireland	6	3	3	0	0	6	−0.933
6	Zimbabwe	6	1	5	0	0	2	−0.527
7	United Arab Emirates	6	0	6	0	0	0	−2.032

Source: ESPNcricinfo
- Advanced to knockout stage.

15 February
14:00 (ACDT) (D/N)
Scorecard

India; 300/7 (50 overs)	v	Pakistan; 224 (47 overs)
Virat Kohli 107 (126); Sohail Khan 5/55 (10 overs)		Misbah-ul-Haq 76 (84); Mohammed Shami 4/35 (9 overs)

India won by 76 runs
Adelaide Oval, Adelaide
Umpires: Richard Kettleborough (Eng) and Ian Gould (Eng)
Player of the match: Virat Kohli (Ind)

- India won the toss and elected to bat first.

21 February
11:00 (NZDT)
Scorecard

West Indies; 310/6 (50 overs)	v	Pakistan; 160 (39 overs)
Denesh Ramdin 51 (43); Haris Sohail 2/62 (9 overs)		Umar Akmal 59 (71); Jerome Taylor 3/15 (7 overs)

West Indies won by 150 runs
Hagley Oval, Christchurch
Umpires: Marais Erasmus (SA) and Nigel Llong (Eng)
Player of the match: Andre Russell (WI)

- Pakistan won the toss and elected to field.
- Pakistan recorded the worst start to an innings in an ODI, losing four wickets for only one run.
- This was the West Indies' biggest margin of victory over Pakistan by runs in an ODI.

1 March
13:30 (AEST) (D/N)
Scorecard

Pakistan; 235/7 (50 overs)	v	Zimbabwe; 215 (49.4 overs)
Misbah-ul-Haq 73 (121); Tendai Chatara 3/35 (10 overs)		Brendan Taylor 50 (72); Mohammad Irfan 4/30 (10 overs)

Pakistan won by 20 runs
Brisbane Cricket Ground, Brisbane
Umpires: Richard Kettleborough (Eng) and Joel Wilson (WI)
Player of the match: Wahab Riaz (Pak)

- Pakistan won the toss and elected to bat.
- Wahab Riaz became the first Pakistan player to score a 50 and take four wickets in a World Cup match.

4 March
14:00 (NZDT) (D/N)
Scorecard

Pakistan; 339/6 (50 overs)	v	United Arab Emirates; 210/8 (50 overs)
Ahmed Shehzad 93 (105); Manjula Guruge 4/56 (8 overs)		Shaiman Anwar 62 (88); Shahid Afridi 2/35 (10 overs)

Pakistan won by 129 runs
McLean Park, Napier
Umpires: Johan Cloete (SA) and Sundaram Ravi (Ind)
Player of the match: Ahmed Shehzad (Pak)

- United Arab Emirates won the toss and elected to field.
- Shahid Afridi became the fourth Pakistan player to score 8,000 runs in ODI matches.

7 March
14:00 (NZDT) (D/N)
Scorecard

Pakistan; 222 (46.4 overs)	v	South Africa; 202 (33.3 overs)
Misbah-ul-Haq 56 (86); Dale Steyn 3/30 (10 overs)		AB de Villiers 77 (58); Rahat Ali 3/40 (8 overs)

Pakistan won by 29 runs (D/L method)
Eden Park, Auckland
Umpires: Richard Kettleborough (Eng) and Bruce Oxenford (Aus)
Player of the match: Sarfraz Ahmed (Pak)

- South Africa won the toss and elected to field.
- Match reduced to 47 overs per side and South Africa's target moved to 232 due to rain.
- This was the first time Pakistan defeated South Africa in a World Cup match.
- Sarfaraz Ahmed (Pak) became only the tenth player to take 6 dismissals in an ODI innings and only the second in a World Cup match.

15 March
14:00 (ACDT) (D/N)
Scorecard

Ireland; 237 (50 overs)	v	Pakistan; 241/3 (46.1 overs)
William Porterfield 107 (131); Wahab Riaz 3/54 (10 overs)		Sarfraz Ahmed 101* (124); Alex Cusack 1/43 (10 overs)

Pakistan won by 7 wickets
Adelaide Oval, Adelaide
Umpires: Marais Erasmus (SA) and Ruchira Palliyaguruge (SL)
Player of the match: Sarfraz Ahmed (Pak)

- Ireland won the toss and elected to bat.
- Sarfraz Ahmed scored his maiden ODI century and became the first Pakistan wicket-keeper to score a century in a World Cup match.
- Pakistan and West Indies qualified for the quarter-finals as a result of this match.
- Ireland were eliminated from the World Cup as a result of this match.

=== Quarter-final ===
20 March
14:00 (ACDT) (D/N)
Scorecard

Pakistan; 213 (49.5 overs)	v	Australia; 216/4 (33.5 overs)
Haris Sohail 41 (57); Josh Hazlewood 4/35 (10 overs)		Steve Smith 65 (69); Wahab Riaz 2/54 (9 overs)

Australia won by 6 wickets
Adelaide Oval, Adelaide
Umpires: Kumar Dharmasena (SL) and Marais Erasmus (SA)
Player of the match: Josh Hazlewood (Aus)

- Pakistan won the toss and elected to bat.
- This was the last ODI for Shahid Afridi and Misbah-ul-Haq (both Pak).
- Wahab Riaz (Pak) was fined 50% of his match fee, and Shane Watson (Aus) was fined 15% of his match fee, after a verbal encounter at the end of the 33rd over.

== Pakistan at the 2019 World Cup ==
There were eerie similarities between Pakistan's performance in the group stage in the 2019 and 1992 World Cups.

=== Points table ===
Pos	Team	Pld	W	L	T	NR	Pts	NRR	Qualification
1	India	9	7	1	0	1	15	0.809	Advanced to semi-finals
2	Australia	9	7	2	0	0	14	0.868	Advanced to semi-finals
3	England (H)	9	6	3	0	0	12	1.152	Advanced to semi-finals
4	New Zealand	9	5	3	0	1	11	0.175	Advanced to semi-finals
5	Pakistan	9	5	3	0	1	11	−0.430	Eliminated
6	Sri Lanka	9	3	4	0	2	8	−0.919	Eliminated
7	South Africa	9	3	5	0	1	7	−0.030	Eliminated
8	Bangladesh	9	3	5	0	1	7	−0.410	Eliminated
9	West Indies	9	2	6	0	1	5	−0.225	Eliminated
10	Afghanistan	9	0	9	0	0	0	−1.322	Eliminated

Source: ICC, ESPNcricinfo
Rules for classification: 1) Points; 2) Wins; 3) Net run rate; 4) Results of games between tied teams; 5) Pre-tournament seeding
(H) Host

31 May 2019
10:30
Scorecard

Pakistan; 105 (21.4 overs)	v	West Indies; 108/3 (13.4 overs)
Fakhar Zaman 22 (16); Oshane Thomas 4/27 (5.4 overs)		Chris Gayle 50 (34); Mohammad Amir 3/26 (6 overs)

West Indies won by 7 wickets
Trent Bridge, Nottingham
Umpires: Marais Erasmus (SA) and Chris Gaffaney (NZ)
Player of the match: Oshane Thomas (WI)

- West Indies won the toss and elected to field.
- Hasan Ali (Pak) played in his 50th ODI.
- Shai Hope (WI) took his 100th catch as a wicket-keeper in international cricket.
- Chris Gayle (WI) scored his 40th six in World Cup matches, the most by any batsman in World Cup history, surpassing AB de Villiers's record of 37.
- This was Pakistan's eleventh consecutive loss, their worst winless streak in ODIs.
- Pakistan scored their second lowest total in the Cricket World Cup, and also recorded their biggest margin of defeat in the Cricket World Cup in terms of balls remaining (218 balls).

3 June 2019
10:30
Scorecard

Pakistan; 348/8 (50 overs)	v	England; 334/9 (50 overs)
Mohammad Hafeez 84 (62); Moeen Ali 3/50 (10 overs)		Joe Root 107 (104); Wahab Riaz 3/82 (10 overs)

Pakistan won by 14 runs
Trent Bridge, Nottingham
Umpires: Marais Erasmus (SA) and Sundaram Ravi (Ind)
Player of the match: Mohammad Hafeez (Pak)

- England won the toss and elected to field.
- Jason Roy (Eng) scored his 3,000th run in ODIs.
- This was the first time England had lost a run chase in ODIs played at home since 2015, ending a streak of 16 consecutive wins when batting second.
- England became the first team to lose a World Cup match with two players scoring centuries.

7 June 2019
10:30
Scorecard

Pakistan	v	Sri Lanka

Match abandoned
County Ground, Bristol
Umpires: Ian Gould (Eng) and Nigel Llong (Eng)

- No toss.
- No play was possible due to rain.

12 June 2019
10:30
Scorecard

Australia; 307 (49 overs)	v	Pakistan; 266 (45.4 overs)
David Warner 107 (111); Mohammad Amir 5/30 (10 overs)		Imam-ul-Haq 53 (75); Pat Cummins 3/33 (10 overs)

Australia won by 41 runs
County Ground, Taunton
Umpires: Nigel Llong (Eng) and Ruchira Palliyaguruge (SL)
Player of the match: David Warner (Aus)

- Pakistan won the toss and elected to field.
- Mohammad Amir (Pak) took his first five-wicket haul in ODIs.
- Nathan Coulter-Nile (Aus) took his 50th wicket in ODIs.

16 June 2019
10:30
Scorecard

India; 336/5 (50 overs)	v	Pakistan; 212/6 (40 overs)
Rohit Sharma 140 (113); Mohammad Amir 3/47 (10 overs)		Fakhar Zaman 62 (75); Vijay Shankar 2/22 (5.2 overs)

India won by 89 runs (DLS method)
Old Trafford, Manchester
Umpires: Marais Erasmus (SA) and Bruce Oxenford (Aus)
Player of the match: Rohit Sharma (Ind)

- Pakistan won the toss and elected to field.
- Pakistan were set a revised target of 302 runs from 40 overs due to rain.
- Virat Kohli (Ind) became the ninth batsman (and fastest in terms of innings) to score 11,000 runs in ODIs (222).
- India's score was the highest team total against Pakistan in a World Cup match.
- Hasan Ali conceded 84 runs, the most by a Pakistani bowler in a World Cup match.
- Vijay Shankar (Ind) was the third bowler to take a wicket with his first ball in the World Cup.

23 June 2019
10:30
Scorecard

Pakistan; 308/7 (50 overs)	v	South Africa; 259/9 (50 overs)
Haris Sohail 89 (59); Lungi Ngidi 3/64 (9 overs)		Faf du Plessis 63 (79); Wahab Riaz 3/46 (10 overs)

Pakistan won by 49 runs
Lord's, London
Umpires: Kumar Dharmasena (SL) and Joel Wilson (WI)
Player of the match: Haris Sohail (Pak)

- Pakistan won the toss and elected to bat.
- Andile Phehlukwayo (SA) played in his 50th ODI.
- Shadab Khan (Pak) took his 50th wicket in ODIs.
- South Africa were eliminated as a result of this match, making it the first time since 2003 that they have failed to progress to the knock-out stage of a world cup.

26 June 2019
10:30
Scorecard

New Zealand; 237/6 (50 overs)	v	Pakistan; 241/4 (49.1 overs)
James Neesham 97* (112); Shaheen Afridi 3/28 (10 overs)		Babar Azam 101* (127); Kane Williamson 1/39 (8 overs)

Pakistan won by 6 wickets
Edgbaston, Birmingham
Umpires: Bruce Oxenford (Aus) and Paul Reiffel (Aus)
Player of the match: Babar Azam (Pak)

- New Zealand won the toss and elected to bat.
- Babar Azam became the fastest batsman for Pakistan, in terms of innings, to score 3,000 runs in ODIs (68).
- Babar Azam also scored his 10th century in ODIs.

29 June 2019
10:30
Scorecard

Afghanistan; 227/9 (50 overs)	v	Pakistan; 230/7 (49.4 overs)
Asghar Afghan 42 (35); Shaheen Afridi 4/47 (10 overs)		Imad Wasim 49* (54); Mohammad Nabi 2/23 (10 overs)

Pakistan won by 3 wickets
Headingley, Leeds
Umpires: Nigel Llong (Eng) and Paul Wilson (Aus)
Player of the match: Imad Wasim (Pak)

- Afghanistan won the toss and elected to bat.
- Mohammad Nabi (Afg) took his 200th wicket in international cricket.

5 July 2019
10:30
Scorecard

Pakistan; 315/9 (50 overs)	v	Bangladesh; 221 (44.1 overs)
Imam-ul-Haq 100 (100); Mustafizur Rahman 5/75 (10 overs)		Shakib Al Hasan 64 (77); Shaheen Afridi 6/35 (9.1 overs)

Pakistan won by 94 runs
Lord's, London
Umpires: Michael Gough (Eng) and Richard Kettleborough (Eng)
Player of the match: Shaheen Afridi (Pak)

- Pakistan won the toss and elected to bat.
- Mustafizur Rahman became the fastest bowler for Bangladesh, in terms of innings, to take 100 wickets in ODIs (54 innings).
- Babar Azam scored the most runs by a Pakistan batsman in a single World Cup tournament (474).
- Shakib Al Hasan (Ban) equalled Sachin Tendulkar's record of making the most 50+ scores in a single World Cup tournament (7).
- Shaheen Afridi (Pak) became the youngest bowler to take a five-wicket haul in a World Cup match (19 years 90 days).
- Shaheen Afridi also took the best bowling figures by a bowler for Pakistan in a World Cup match.
- New Zealand qualified for the semi-finals and Pakistan were eliminated as a result of this match.

== Batting records ==
=== Highest team score ===
Rank	Score	Overs	Inning	Opponent	Venue	Year
1	349/10	49.5	1st	Zimbabwe	Kingston	2007
2	348/8	50	1st	England	Nottingham	2019
3	345/4	48.2	2nd	Sri Lanka	Hyderabad	2023
4	338/5	60	1st	Sri Lanka	Swansea	1983
5	330/6	60	1st	Sri Lanka	Nottingham	1975

=== Highest individual innings ===
Player	Score	Opponent	Venue	Year
Imran Nazir	160	Zimbabwe	Kingston	2007
Mohammad Rizwan	131*	Sri Lanka	Hyderabad	2023
Fakhar Zaman	126*	New Zealand	Bangalore	2023
Rameez Raja	119*	New Zealand	Christchurch	1992
Aamer Sohail	114	Zimbabwe	Hobart	1992
Saeed Anwar	113*	New Zealand	Manchester	1999

=== Highest successful run chase ===
Score	Overs	Target	Opponent	Venue	Year
345/4	48.2	344	Sri Lanka	Hyderabad	2023
264/6	49.0	263	New Zealand	Auckland	1992
250/3	47.4	250	England	Karachi	1996
247/3	49.0	245	England	Karachi	1987
242/1	47.3	241	New Zealand	Manchester	1999
241/3	46.1	238	Ireland	Adelaide	2015

=== Most runs ===
Player	Runs	Years
Javed Miandad	1,083	1975–1996*
Saeed Anwar	915	1996–2003
Babar Azam	794	2019–2023
Inzamam-ul-Haq	717	1992–2007
Rameez Raja	700	1987–1996

=== Most runs in a single tournament ===
Player	Runs	Tournament
Babar Azam	474	2019
Javed Miandad	437	1992
Mohammad Rizwan	395	2023
Saeed Anwar	368	1999
Misbah-ul-Haq	350	2015

=== Most centuries ===
Player	Centuries	Years
Rameez Raja	3	1987–1996
Saeed Anwar	3	1996–2003
Aamer Sohail	2	1992–1996

=== Most fifties ===
Player	Fifties	Years
Javed Miandad	9	1975–1996
Misbah-ul-Haq	7	2011–2015
Babar Azam	7	2019–2023
Aamer Sohail	6	1992–1996
Saeed Anwar	6	1996–2003

=== Highest averages ===
Player	Average	Years
Babar Azam	67.71	2019
Rameez Raja	53.84	1987–1996
Saeed Anwar	53.82	1996–2003
Misbah-ul-Haq	49.83	2011–2015
Zaheer Abbas	49.75	1975–1983

=== Most sixes ===
Player	Years	Matches	Innings	Total sixes
Fakhar Zaman	2019–2023*	11*	11*	21*
Shahid Afridi	1999–2015	27	24	12
Wasim Akram	1987–2003	38	30	11
Misbah-ul-Haq	2011–2015	15	13	10
Imran Nazir	2007	3	3	9
Wahab Riaz	2011–2019	19	13	8
Imran Khan	1975–1992	28	24	8

=== Lowest team score ===
Rank	Total score	Overs	Inning	Opponent	Venue	Year
1	74/10	40.2	1st	England	Adelaide	1992
2	105/10	21.4	1st	West Indies	Nottingham	2019
3	132–10	45.4	1st	Ireland	Kingston	2007
4	132/10	39.0	1st	Australia	Lord's	1999
5	134/10	31.0	2nd	England	Cape Town	2003

=== Most ducks ===
Rank	Name	Matches	Innings	Total ducks
1	Ijaz Ahmed	29	26	5
2	Inzamam-ul-Haq	35	33	4
3	Younis Khan	19	18	3
4	Wasim Akram	38	30	3

== Bowling records ==
=== Most wickets ===
Player	Years	Matches	Innings	Wickets
Wasim Akram	1987–2003	38	36	55
Wahab Riaz	2011–2019	20	20	35
Shaheen Afridi	2019–2023	13	13	34
Imran Khan	1975–1992	28	19	34
Shoaib Akhtar	1999–2011	19	18	30
Shahid Afridi	1999–2015	27	24	30

=== Most wickets in a single tournament ===
Player	Wickets	Tournament
Shahid Afridi	21	2011
Shaheen Afridi	18	2023
Wasim Akram	18	1992
Mohammed Amir	17	2019
Imran Khan	17	1987

=== Best bowling figures ===
Player	Bowling figures	Opponent	Venue	Year
Shaheen Afridi	6/35 (9.1 overs)	Bangladesh	Lord's	2019
Shahid Afridi	5/16 (8 overs)	Kenya	Hambantota	2011
Shahid Afridi	5/23 (10 overs)	Canada	Colombo	2011
Wasim Akram	5/28 (9 overs)	Namibia	Kimberley	2003
Mohammad Amir	5/30 (10 overs)	Australia	Taunton	2019

=== Most five-wicket hauls ===
Player	Years	Matches	Innings	5-wicket hauls
Shaheen Afridi	2019–2023	5	5	2
Shahid Afridi	1999–2015	27	24	2
Mohammad Amir	2019	8	8	1
Sohail Khan	2015	7	7	1
Saqlain Mushtaq	1996–2003	14	14	1

=== Most four-wicket hauls ===
Player	4-wicket hauls	Years
Shahid Afridi	4	1999–2015
Abdul Qadir	3	1983–1987
Wasim Akram	3	1987–2003
Shaheen Afridi	2	2019
Wahab Riaz	2	2011–2019
Imran Khan	2	1975–1992

== Wicket-keeping records ==
=== Most dismissals ===
Player	Years	Matches	Innings	Dismissals
Moin Khan	1992–1999	20	20	30
Wasim Bari	1975–1983	14	14	22
Sarfaraz Ahmed	2015–2019	11	11	20
Kamran Akmal	2007–2011	11	11	17
Rashid Latif	1992–2003	12	11	17

=== Most dismissals in an innings ===
Player	Dismissals	Catches	Stumped	Inning	Opponent	Venue	Year
Sarfaraz Ahmed	6	6	0	2nd	South Africa	Auckland	2015
Rashid Latif	5	4	1	2nd	New Zealand	Lahore	1996
Umar Akmal	5	5	0	2nd	Zimbabwe	Brisbane	2015
Wasim Bari	4	3	1	1st	New Zealand	Birmingham	1983
Kamran Akmal	4	3	1	1st	West Indies	Kingston	2007

=== Most dismissals in a tournament ===
Player	Year	Matches	Innings	Dismissals
Moin Khan	1999	10	10	16
Sarfaraz Ahmed	2019	8	8	14
Moin Khan	1992	10	10	14
Kamran Akmal	2011	8	8	12
Rashid Latif	1996	6	6	9

== Fielding records ==
=== Most catches ===
Player	Years	Matches	Innings	Catches
Inzamam-ul-Haq	1992–2007	35	34	16
Shahid Afridi	1999–2015	27	27	13
Ijaz Ahmed	1987–1999	29	29	11
Javed Miandad	1975–1996	33	33	10
Younis Khan	2003–2015	19	18	9

=== Most catches in an innings ===
Player	Catches	Inning	Opponent	Venue	Year
Umar Akmal	4	1st	Ireland	Adelaide	2015
Ijaz Ahmed	3	2nd	Australia	Perth	1992
Inzamam-ul-haq	3	2nd	Zimbabwe	Kingston	2007
Zaheer Abbas	2	2nd	Sri Lanka	Nottingham	1975
Asif Iqbal	2	1st	Canada	Leeds	1979

=== Most catches in a tournament ===
Player	Year	Matches	Innings	Catches
Inzamam-ul-Haq	1999	10	10	6
Babar Azam	2019	8	8	5
Mohammad Hafeez	2019	8	8	5
Shahid Afridi	2011	8	8	5
Wasim Akram	1999	10	10	5

== Partnership records ==
=== Highest partnership by wicket ===
Wicket	Runs	Partners	Opponent	Venue	Year
1st	194	Saeed Anwar, Wajahatullah Wasti	New Zealand	Manchester	1999
2nd	194*	Fakhar Zaman, Babar Azam	New Zealand	Bengaluru	2023
3rd	176	Abdullah Shafique, Mohammad Rizwan	Sri Lanka	Hyderabad (Deccan)	2023
4th	147*	Zaheer Abbas, Imran Khan	New Zealand	Nottingham	1983
5th	118	Misbah-ul-Haq, Umar Akmal	Kenya	Hambantota	2011
6th	144	Imran Khan, Shahid Mahboob	Sri Lanka	Leeds	1983
7th	74	Azhar Mahmood, Wasim Akram	West Indies	Bristol	1999
8th	64	Sarfaraz Ahmed, Wahab Riaz	Australia	Taunton	2019
9th	66	Abdul Razaq, Umar Gul	New Zealand	Pallekele	2011
10th	54	Saqlain Mushtaq, Shoaib Akhtar	England	Cape Town	2003

=== Highest partnerships by runs ===
Wicket	Runs	Partners	Opponent	Venue	Year
1st	194	Saeed Anwar, Wajahatullah Wasti	New Zealand	Manchester	1999
2nd	194*	Fakhar Zaman, Babar Azam	New Zealand	Bengaluru	2023
3rd	176	Abdullah Shafique, Mohammad Rizwan	Sri Lanka	Hyderabad(Deccan)	2023
4th	167	Ramiz Raja, Saleem Malik	England	Karachi	1987
5th	166	Majid Khan, Zaheer Abbas	West Indies	The Oval	1979

== Most matches ==
=== Most matches as a player ===
Player	Years	Matches	Runs	Wickets
Wasim Akram	1987–2003	38	426	55
Inzamam-ul-Haq	1992–2003	35	717	0
Javed Miandad	1975–1996	33	1083	4
Ijaz Ahmed	1987–1999	29	516	1
Imran Khan	1975–1992	28	666	34

=== Most matches as a captain ===
Player	Years	Played	Won	Lost
Imran Khan	1983–1992	22	14	8
Wasim Akram	1996–1999	15	10	5
Shahid Afridi	2011	8	6	2
Sarfaraz Ahmed	2019	8	5	3
Babar Azam	2023	8*	4*	4*
Misbah-Ul-Haq	2015	7	4	3
