= Most Productive Overs method =

Mathematical cricket match scoring formulation

The Most Productive Overs (MPO) method was a mathematical formulation designed to calculate the target score for the team batting second in a limited overs cricket match interrupted by weather or other circumstances.

It was used from 1991, when it replaced the Average Run Rate method, until 1998.

MPO was used most notably during the 1992 Cricket World Cup, and the controversial effect of its application during the England v South Africa semi-final directly led to the development of the current, Duckworth–Lewis–Stern, method.

== History ==
The Average Run Rate method was replaced in 1991 by the Most Productive Overs method, having been developed by Australia after the third 1989 Australian Tri-Series final between Australia and the West Indies.

Chasing Australia's 226/4 off 38 overs, the West Indies initially needed 180 off 31.2 overs (a required RR of 5.74) when rain stopped play for 85 minutes. Under the average run-rate method, the revised target was 108, meaning the West Indies needed 61 off the 11.2 overs that remained (a required RR of 5.38).

After the West Indies won the match (and the competition) by eight wickets with 4.4 overs remaining, Australian fans loudly booed this unsatisfactory conclusion, which was criticised by the media and Australia's captain Allan Border.

== Calculation ==
If an interruption means that the innings of the team batting second is reduced to a total of X overs, their target score is adjusted as follows:

$$\text{Team 2's new target from their total of X overs }=\text{ Runs scored by Team 1 in their highest-scoring X overs } + 1.$$

== Criticisms ==
Whereas the Average Run Rate method had heavily favoured the team batting second (Team 2), the Most Productive Overs method only favoured the team batting first (Team 1).

There are four intrinsic flaws in the method:

- Firstly, it effectively penalised Team 2 for good bowling, as it ignored their best overs in setting the revised target, which is counterintuitive.
- Secondly, the method took no consideration of wickets lost, but how Team 1 scored their total.
- Thirdly, substantial bookwork was required by the umpires and officials to determine the revised target.
- Fourthly, if the least productive x overs were all maiden overs with no leg byes or byes scored, the method would set Team 2 the same target as Team 1 scored but with fewer overs to face.

Two subsequent modifications were used: resetting the target based on the x consecutive most productive overs of Team 1's innings (where x is the number of overs Team 2 is to face), and reducing the target by 0.5% for each over lost, with the revised target being given by the next highest integer.

While these modifications reduced Team 1's advantage, they only addressed the fourth intrinsic flaw of the method.
