= 1992 Cricket World Cup =

Cricket World Cup

- Dates: 22 February – 25 March 1992
- Administrator: International Cricket Council
- Cricket format: One Day International
- Tournament format(s): Round-robin and Knockout
- Hosts: Australia; New Zealand
- Champions: Pakistan (1st title)
- Runners-up: England
- Participants: 9
- Matches: 39
- Player of the series: (New Zealand) Martin Crowe
- Most runs: (New Zealand) Martin Crowe (456)
- Most wickets: (Pakistan) Wasim Akram (18)

The 1992 Cricket World Cup (known as the Benson & Hedges World Cup 1992 for sponsorship reasons) was the fifth Cricket World Cup, the premier One Day International cricket tournament for men's national teams, organised by the International Cricket Council (ICC). It was held in Australia and New Zealand from 22 February to 25 March 1992, and finished with Pakistan beating England by 22 runs in the final to become the World Cup champions for the first time. The tournament is remembered for the controversial "rain rule".

== Host selection ==
Australia and New Zealand were awarded the hosting rights in January 1989, defeating a joint India-Pakistan bid after those two nations had hosted the preceding 1987 World Cup. The Australia–New Zealand bid proposed that the tournament be held in February and March 1992, at the end of the local cricket season, while the India–Pakistan bid would have seen the tournament held in late 1991. The seven full members of the ICC were given two votes each in the ballot, while the 18 associate members were given one vote each. The results of the ballot were not released, but the winning bid reportedly enjoyed strong support from the ICC associate members.

== Firsts ==
The 1992 World Cup was the first to feature coloured player clothing, white cricket balls and black sight screens, with a number of matches being played under floodlights. It was also the first Cricket World Cup to be held in the Southern Hemisphere, and the first to include South Africa, who had been allowed to re-join the International Cricket Council as a Test-playing nation after the end of apartheid in 1990. For the first time, the World Cup was not held after a four-year gap, but after a five-year gap.

== Format ==
The format was changed from previous tournaments, with a complete round-robin replacing the former two qualifying groups. The initial draw was released with eight competing countries and 28 round-robin matches, plus two semi-finals and a final. In late 1991, South Africa were re-admitted to the International Cricket Council after 21 years of exclusion due to apartheid, and the draw was amended to include them, adding another eight matches to the round-robin.

The rule for calculating the target score for the team batting second in rain-affected matches was also changed. The previous rule (the Average Run Rate method) simply multiplied the run rate of the team batting first by the number of overs available to the team batting second, but this rule had been deemed to give an unfair advantage to the team batting second.

In an attempt to rectify this, the target score would now be calculated by the Most Productive Overs method. In this system, if the team batting second had 44 overs available, their target score would be one greater than the 44 highest scoring overs of the team batting first.

While the reasoning behind the system seemed plausible, the timing of rain interruptions remained problematic: as the semi-final between England and South Africa demonstrated, where a difficult but eminently reachable 23 runs off 13 balls was reduced to 23 runs off 7 (the least productive over, a maiden, being deducted) and finally, a preposterous 22 off 1 ball (the next least productive over having given 1 run). It was seen that, if the interruption came during the second innings, the side batting second was at a significant disadvantage – one which was only overcome once, in fact, in England's group-stage victory over South Africa. The farcical end to the semi-final led to the creation of the Duckworth-Lewis method.

== Teams ==
The 1992 World Cup featured the seven Test teams at that time.

For the first time, South Africa competed as the eighth full member of the ICC, and would play their first Test in 22 years in the West Indies a month after the World Cup. Zimbabwe appeared for the third time, having qualified by winning the 1990 ICC Trophy defeating the Netherlands in the final for the second time. Zimbabwe would gain full member status following the tournament and play their first Test match later in 1992. Teams who entered were:

Full Members
Australia
England
India
New Zealand
Pakistan
South Africa
Sri Lanka
West Indies
Associate Member
Zimbabwe

== Venues ==
=== Australia ===
Venues in Australia

Venue	City	State/territory	Number of matches	Matches
Adelaide Oval	Adelaide	South Australia	3	Round robin
Lavington Sports Oval	Albury	New South Wales	1	Round robin
Eastern Oval	Ballarat	Victoria	1	Round robin
Berri Oval	Berri	South Australia	1	Round robin
The Gabba	Brisbane	Queensland	3	Round robin
Manuka Oval	Canberra	Australian Capital Territory	1	Round robin
Bellerive Oval	Hobart	Tasmania	2	Round robin
Ray Mitchell Oval	Mackay	Queensland	1	Round robin
Melbourne Cricket Ground	Melbourne	Victoria	5	Round robin, Final
WACA Ground	Perth	Western Australia	3	Round robin
Sydney Cricket Ground	Sydney	New South Wales	4	Round robin, 2nd semi-final

=== New Zealand ===
Venues in New Zealand

Venue	City	Region	Number of matches	Matches
Eden Park	Auckland	Auckland	4	Round robin, 1st semi-final
Lancaster Park	Christchurch	Canterbury	2	Round robin
Carisbrook	Dunedin	Otago	1	Round robin
Seddon Park	Hamilton	Waikato	2	Round robin
McLean Park	Napier	Hawke's Bay	1	Round robin
Pukekura Park	New Plymouth	Taranaki	1	Round robin
Basin Reserve	Wellington	Wellington	3	Round robin

== Officials ==
=== Umpires ===
Eleven umpires were selected to officiate at the World Cup: two from each of the host nations and one from each of the other participating nations.

West Indies' Steve Bucknor and England's David Shepherd were chosen as the umpires for the first semi-final, while New Zealand's Brian Aldridge and Australia's Steve Randell were chosen for the second. Bucknor and Aldridge were chosen for the final.

Umpire	Country	Matches
Steve Bucknor	West Indies	9
Brian Aldridge	New Zealand	9
David Shepherd	England	8
Steve Randell	Australia	8
Khizer Hayat	Pakistan	7
Piloo Reporter	India	7
Dooland Buultjens	Sri Lanka	6
Peter McConnell	Australia	6
Steve Woodward	New Zealand	6
Ian Robinson	Zimbabwe	6
Karl Liebenberg	South Africa	6

=== Match referees ===
Two match referees were also selected to supervise the semi-finals and final. Australia's Peter Burge supervised the first semi-final and the final, while New Zealand's Frank Cameron supervised the second semi-final.

Referee	Country	Matches
Peter Burge	Australia	2
Frank Cameron	New Zealand	1

== Round-robin stage ==
Co-hosts New Zealand proved the surprise package of the tournament, winning their first seven consecutive games to finish on top of the table after the round-robin. The other hosts, Australia, one of the pre-tournament favourites lost their first two matches. They recovered somewhat to win four of the remaining six, but narrowly missed out on the semi-finals. The West Indies also finished with a 4–4 record, but were just behind Australia on run-rate. South Africa made a triumphant return to international cricket with a win over Australia at the Sydney Cricket Ground in their first match. They and England had solid campaigns and easily qualified for the semis, despite upset losses to Sri Lanka and Zimbabwe respectively. India had a disappointing tournament and never looked likely to progress beyond the round-robin. Sri Lanka were still establishing themselves at the highest level and beat only Zimbabwe (who did not yet have Test status) and South Africa.

New Zealand were defeated only twice in the tournament. Both losses were to champions Pakistan, once in the group stage and the second in the semi-final.

=== Points table ===
Pos	Team	Pld	W	L	NR	Pts	NRR
1	New Zealand	8	7	1	0	14	0.592
2	England	8	5	2	1	11	0.470
3	South Africa	8	5	3	0	10	0.138
4	Pakistan	8	4	3	1	9	0.166
5	Australia	8	4	4	0	8	0.201
6	West Indies	8	4	4	0	8	0.076
7	India	8	2	5	1	5	0.137
8	Sri Lanka	8	2	5	1	5	−0.686
9	Zimbabwe	8	1	7	0	2	−1.142

=== Tournament progression ===
Team	Round-robin stage								Knockout	
Team	1	2	3	4	5	6	7	8	SF	F
Australia	0	0	2	2	4	4	6	8		
England	2	4	5	7	9	11	11	11	W	L
India	0	1	1	3	5	5	5	5		
New Zealand	2	4	6	8	10	12	14	14	L	
Pakistan	0	2	3	3	3	5	7	9	W	W
South Africa	2	2	2	4	6	8	8	10	L	
Sri Lanka	2	2	3	5	5	5	5	5		
West Indies	2	2	4	4	4	6	8	8		
Zimbabwe	0	0	0	0	0	0	0	2		

Won	Lost	No result

Note: The total points at the end of each group match are listed.
Note: Click on the points (group matches) or W/L (knockout) to see the match summary.

=== Results ===
22 February 1992
Scorecard

New Zealand; 248/6 (50 overs)	v	Australia; 211 (48.1 overs)
Martin Crowe 100* (134); Craig McDermott 2/43 (10 overs)		David Boon 100 (133); Gavin Larsen 3/30 (10 overs)

New Zealand won by 37 runs
Eden Park, Auckland
Umpires: Khizer Hayat and David Shepherd
Player of the match: Martin Crowe (NZ)

22 February 1992
Scorecard

England; 236/9 (50 overs)	v	India; 227 (49.2 overs)
Robin Smith 91 (108); Manoj Prabhakar 2/34 (10 overs)		Ravi Shastri 57 (112); Dermot Reeve 3/38 (6 overs)

England won by 9 runs
WACA Ground, Perth
Umpires: Dooland Buultjens and Peter McConnell
Player of the match: Ian Botham (Eng)

23 February 1992
Scorecard

Zimbabwe; 312/4 (50 overs)	v	Sri Lanka; 313/7 (49.2 overs)
Andy Flower 115* (152); Pramodya Wickramasinghe 2/50 (10 overs)		Arjuna Ranatunga 88* (61); Eddo Brandes 3/70 (10 overs)

Sri Lanka won by 3 wickets
Pukekura Park, New Plymouth
Umpires: Piloo Reporter and Steve Woodward
Player of the match: Andy Flower (Zim)

23 February 1992
Scorecard

Pakistan; 220/2 (50 overs)	v	West Indies; 221/0 (46.5 overs)
Rameez Raja 102* (158); Roger Harper 1/33 (10 overs)		Desmond Haynes 93* (144); Wasim Akram 0/37 (10 overs)

West Indies won by 10 wickets
Melbourne Cricket Ground, Melbourne
Umpires: Steve Randell and Ian Robinson
Player of the match: Brian Lara (WI)

25 February 1992
Scorecard

Sri Lanka; 206/9 (50 overs)	v	New Zealand; 210/4 (48.2 overs)
Roshan Mahanama 80 (131); Willie Watson 3/37 (10 overs)		Ken Rutherford 65* (71); Ruwan Kalpage 2/33 (10 overs)

New Zealand won by 6 wickets
Seddon Park, Hamilton
Umpires: Piloo Reporter and David Shepherd
Player of the match: Ken Rutherford (NZ)

26 February 1992
Scorecard

Australia; 170/9 (49 overs)	v	South Africa; 171/1 (46.5 overs)
David Boon 27 (31); Allan Donald 3/34 (10 overs)		Kepler Wessels 81* (148); Peter Taylor 1/32 (10 overs)

South Africa won by 9 wickets
Sydney Cricket Ground, Sydney
Umpires: Brian Aldridge and Steve Bucknor
Player of the match: Kepler Wessels (SA)

27 February 1992
Scorecard

Pakistan; 254/4 (50 overs)	v	Zimbabwe; 201/7 (50 overs)
Aamir Sohail 114 (136); Iain Butchart 3/57 (10 overs)		Andy Waller 44 (36); Wasim Akram 3/21 (10 overs)

Pakistan won by 53 runs
Bellerive Oval, Hobart
Umpires: Dooland Buultjens and Steve Randell
Player of the match: Aamir Sohail (Pak)

27 February 1992
Scorecard

West Indies; 157 (49.2 overs)	v	England; 160/4 (39.5 overs)
Keith Arthurton 54 (101); Chris Lewis 3/30 (8.2 overs)		Graham Gooch 65 (101); Winston Benjamin 2/22 (9.5 overs)

England won by 6 wickets
Melbourne Cricket Ground, Melbourne
Umpires: Karl Liebenberg and Steve Woodward
Player of the match: Chris Lewis (Eng)

28 February 1992
Scorecard

India; 1/0 (0.2 overs)	v	Sri Lanka

No result
Ray Mitchell Oval, Mackay
Umpires: Ian Robinson and David Shepherd

- The match was initially reduced to 20 overs a side due to rain. A helicopter was used to dry the pitch but as play began, it rained again and the match was abandoned.

29 February 1992
Scorecard

South Africa; 190/7 (50 overs)	v	New Zealand; 191/3 (34.3 overs)
Peter Kirsten 90 (129); Willie Watson 2/30 (10 overs)		Mark Greatbatch 68 (60); Peter Kirsten 1/22 (7 overs)

New Zealand won by 7 wickets
Eden Park, Auckland
Umpires: Khizer Hayat and Piloo Reporter
Player of the match: Mark Greatbatch (NZ)

29 February 1992
Scorecard

West Indies; 264/8 (50 overs)	v	Zimbabwe; 189/7 (50 overs)
Brian Lara 72 (71); Eddo Brandes 3/45 (10 overs)		Ali Shah 60* (87); Winston Benjamin 3/27 (10 overs)

West Indies won by 75 runs
The Gabba, Brisbane
Umpires: Karl Liebenberg and Steve Woodward
Player of the match: Brian Lara (WI)

- West Indies and Zimbabwe would next play in Brisbane in 2001

1 March 1992
Scorecard

Australia; 237/9 (50 overs)	v	India; 234 (47 overs)
Dean Jones 90 (108); Kapil Dev 3/41 (10 overs)		Mohammed Azharuddin 93 (102); Tom Moody 3/56 (9 overs)

Australia won by 1 run (revised target)
The Gabba, Brisbane
Umpires: Brian Aldridge and Ian Robinson
Player of the match: Dean Jones (Aus)

- Rain interrupted play after 16.2 overs in the Indian innings (45/1). India's target recalculated to 236 off 47 overs.

1 March 1992
Scorecard

Pakistan; 74 (40.2 overs)	v	England; 24/1 (8 overs)
Saleem Malik 17 (20); Derek Pringle 3/8 (8.2 overs)		Ian Botham 6* (22); Wasim Akram 1/7 (3 overs)

No result
Adelaide Oval, Adelaide
Umpires: Steve Bucknor and Peter McConnell

- Rain commenced at lunch with England 17/1 after six overs. Only two further overs were possible after lunch, with England chasing a revised target of 64 off 16 overs and then 63 off 15 overs. With fewer than 15 overs being batted by England, no result was declared.

2 March 1992
Scorecard

South Africa; 195 (50 overs)	v	Sri Lanka; 198/7 (49.5 overs)
Peter Kirsten 47 (81); Don Anurasiri 3/41 (10 overs)		Roshan Mahanama 68 (121); Allan Donald 3/42 (9.5 overs)

Sri Lanka won by 3 wickets
Basin Reserve, Wellington
Umpires: Khizer Hayat and Steve Woodward
Player of the match: Arjuna Ranatunga (SL)

3 March 1992
Scorecard

New Zealand; 162/3 (20.5 overs)	v	Zimbabwe; 105/7 (18 overs)
Martin Crowe 74* (43); Kevin Duers 1/17 (6 overs)		Andy Flower 30 (28); Chris Harris 3/15 (4 overs)

New Zealand won by 48 runs (revised target)
McLean Park, Napier
Umpires: Karl Liebenberg and Dooland Buultjens
Player of the match: Martin Crowe (NZ)

- New Zealand innings interrupted at 9/1 (2.1 overs). Match reduced to 35 overs per side. Further interruption at 52/2 (11.2 ov). Match reduced to 24 overs per side. Innings ended by a third interruption after 20.5 overs. Zimbabwe set a target of 154 from 18 overs.

4 March 1992
Scorecard

India; 216/7 (49 overs)	v	Pakistan; 173 (48.1 overs)
Sachin Tendulkar 54* (62); Mushtaq Ahmed 3/59 (10 overs)		Aamir Sohail 62 (95); Manoj Prabhakar 2/22 (10 overs)

India won by 43 runs
Sydney Cricket Ground, Sydney
Umpires: Peter McConnell and David Shepherd
Player of the match: Sachin Tendulkar (Ind)

- Match reduced to 49 overs per side due to a slow over rate by Pakistan.

5 March 1992
Scorecard

South Africa; 200/8 (50 overs)	v	West Indies; 136 (38.4 overs)
Peter Kirsten 56 (91); Malcolm Marshall 2/26 (10 overs)		Gus Logie 61 (69); Meyrick Pringle 4/11 (8 overs)

South Africa won by 64 runs
Lancaster Park, Christchurch
Umpires: Brian Aldridge and Steve Randell
Player of the match: Meyrick Pringle (SA)

5 March 1992
Scorecard

Australia; 171 (49 overs)	v	England; 173/2 (40.5 overs)
Tom Moody 51 (88); Ian Botham 4/31 (10 overs)		Graham Gooch 58 (112); Mike Whitney 1/28 (10 overs)

England won by 8 wickets
Sydney Cricket Ground, Sydney
Umpires: Steve Bucknor and Khizer Hayat
Player of the match: Ian Botham (Eng)

7 March 1992
Scorecard

India; 203/7 (32 overs)	v	Zimbabwe; 104/1 (19.1 overs)
Sachin Tendulkar 81 (77); John Traicos 3/35 (6 overs)		Andy Flower 43 (56); Sachin Tendulkar 1/35 (6 overs)

India won by 55 runs (revised target)
Seddon Park, Hamilton
Umpires: Dooland Buultjens and Steve Randell
Player of the match: Sachin Tendulkar (Ind)

- After rain forced the game of 32 overs per side, Rain came again at 19.1 over in ZIM Innings thus target was recalculated to 159 runs in the 19 overs.

7 March 1992
Scorecard

Sri Lanka; 189/9 (50 overs)	v	Australia; 190/3 (44 overs)
Aravinda de Silva 62 (83); Peter Taylor 2/34 (10 overs)		Geoff Marsh 60 (113); Pramodya Wickramasinghe 2/29 (10 overs)

Australia won by 7 wickets
Adelaide Oval, Adelaide
Umpires: Piloo Reporter and Ian Robinson
Player of the match: Tom Moody (Aus)

8 March 1992
Scorecard

West Indies; 203/7 (50 overs)	v	New Zealand; 206/5 (48.3 overs)
Brian Lara 52 (81); Gavin Larsen 2/41 (10 overs)		Martin Crowe 81* (81); Winston Benjamin 2/34 (9.3 overs)

New Zealand won by 5 wickets
Eden Park, Auckland
Umpires: Karl Liebenberg and Peter McConnell
Player of the match: Martin Crowe (NZ)

- This was Malcolm Marshall's last ODI.

8 March 1992
Scorecard

South Africa; 211/7 (50 overs)	v	Pakistan; 173/8 (36 overs)
Andrew Hudson 54 (77); Imran Khan 2/34 (10 overs)		Inzamam-ul-Haq 48 (44); Adrian Kuiper 3/40 (6 overs)

South Africa won by 20 runs (revised target)
The Gabba, Brisbane
Umpires: Brian Aldridge and Steve Bucknor
Player of the match: Andrew Hudson (SA)

- When Pakistan was 74/2 after 21.3 overs, rain halted the play for an hour and the target was revised to 194 in 36 overs.

9 March 1992
Scorecard

England; 280/9 (50 overs)	v	Sri Lanka; 174 (44 overs)
Neil Fairbrother 63 (70); Asanka Gurusinha 2/67 (10 overs)		Arjuna Ranatunga 36 (51); Chris Lewis 4/30 (8 overs)

England won by 106 runs
Eastern Oval, Ballarat
Umpires: Khizer Hayat and Piloo Reporter
Player of the match: Chris Lewis (Eng)

10 March 1992
Scorecard

India; 197 (49.4 overs)	v	West Indies; 195/5 (40.2 overs)
Mohammed Azharuddin 61 (84); Anderson Cummins 4/33 (10 overs)		Keith Arthurton 58 (99); Javagal Srinath 2/23 (9 overs)

West Indies won by 5 wickets (revised target)
Basin Reserve, Wellington
Umpires: Steve Randell and Steve Woodward
Player of the match: Anderson Cummins (WI)

- Rain came in 11th over of WI's Innings and the Revised Target became 195 in 46 Overs

10 March 1992
Scorecard

Zimbabwe; 163 (48.3 overs)	v	South Africa; 164/3 (45.1 overs)
Eddo Brandes 20 (28); Peter Kirsten 3/31 (5 overs)		Kepler Wessels 70 (137); Malcolm Jarvis 1/23 (9 overs)

South Africa won by 7 wickets
Manuka Oval, Canberra
Umpires: Steve Bucknor and David Shepherd
Player of the match: Peter Kirsten (SA)

11 March 1992
Scorecard

Pakistan; 220/9 (50 overs)	v	Australia; 172 (45.2 overs)
Aamir Sohail 76 (104); Steve Waugh 3/36 (10 overs)		Dean Jones 47 (79); Aaqib Javed 3/21 (8 overs)

Pakistan won by 48 runs
WACA Ground, Perth
Umpires: Karl Liebenberg and Piloo Reporter
Player of the match: Aamir Sohail (Pak)

12 March 1992
Scorecard

India; 230/6 (50 overs)	v	New Zealand; 231/6 (47.1 overs)
Sachin Tendulkar 84 (107); Chris Harris 3/55 (9 overs)		Mark Greatbatch 73 (77); Manoj Prabhakar 3/46 (10 overs)

New Zealand won by 4 wickets
Carisbrook, Dunedin
Umpires: Peter McConnell and Ian Robinson
Player of the match: Mark Greatbatch (NZ)

12 March 1992
Scorecard

South Africa; 236/4 (50 overs)	v	England; 226/7 (40.5 overs)
Kepler Wessels 85 (126); Graeme Hick 2/44 (8.2 overs)		Alec Stewart 77 (88); Richard Snell 3/42 (7.5 overs)

England won by 3 wickets (revised target)
Melbourne Cricket Ground, Melbourne
Umpires: Brian Aldridge and Dooland Buultjens
Player of the match: Alec Stewart (Eng)

- Rain disrupted play in England's innings for 43 minutes when they were 62/0 after 12.0 overs. The target was revised to 226 in 41 overs.

13 March 1992
Scorecard

West Indies; 268/8 (50 overs)	v	Sri Lanka; 177/9 (50 overs)
Phil Simmons 110 (125); Chandika Hathurusinghe 4/57 (8 overs)		Athula Samarasekera 40 (41); Carl Hooper 2/19 (10 overs)

West Indies won by 91 runs
Berri Oval, Berri
Umpires: David Shepherd and Steve Woodward
Player of the match: Phil Simmons (WI)

14 March 1992
Scorecard

Australia; 265/6 (46 overs)	v	Zimbabwe; 137 (41.4 overs)
Mark Waugh 66* (39); John Traicos 1/30 (10 overs)		Eddo Brandes 23 (28); Peter Taylor 2/14 (3.4 overs)

Australia won by 128 runs
Bellerive Oval, Hobart
Umpires: Brian Aldridge and Steve Bucknor
Player of the match: Steve Waugh (Aus)

- Rain stopped play with Australia 72/1 after 15 overs. Match reduced to 46 overs per side.

15 March 1992
Scorecard

England; 200/8 (50 overs)	v	New Zealand; 201/3 (40.5 overs)
Graeme Hick 56 (70); Dipak Patel 2/26 (10 overs)		Andrew Jones 78 (113); Ian Botham 1/19 (4 overs)

New Zealand won by 7 wickets
Basin Reserve, Wellington
Umpires: Steve Randell and Ian Robinson
Player of the match: Andrew Jones (NZ)

15 March 1992
Scorecard

India; 180/6 (30 overs)	v	South Africa; 181/4 (29.1 overs)
Mohammad Azharuddin 79 (77); Adrian Kuiper 2/28 (6 overs)		Peter Kirsten 84 (86); Manoj Prabhakar 1/33 (5.1 overs)

South Africa won by 6 wickets
Adelaide Oval, Adelaide
Umpires: Dooland Buultjens and Khizer Hayat
Player of the match: Peter Kirsten (SA)

- Rain reduced the match to 30 overs per side.
- Krishnamachari Srikkanth played his final ODI game.

15 March 1992
Scorecard

Sri Lanka; 212/6 (50 overs)	v	Pakistan; 216/6 (49.1 overs)
Aravinda de Silva 43 (56); Mushtaq Ahmed 2/43 (10 overs)		Javed Miandad 57 (84); Champaka Ramanayake 2/37 (10 overs)

Pakistan won by 4 wickets
WACA Ground, Perth
Umpires: Karl Liebenberg and Peter McConnell
Player of the match: Javed Miandad (Pak)

18 March 1992
Scorecard

New Zealand; 166 (48.2 overs)	v	Pakistan; 167/3 (44.4 overs)
Mark Greatbatch 42 (67); Wasim Akram 4/32 (9.2 overs)		Rameez Raja 119* (155); Danny Morrison 3/42 (10 overs)

Pakistan won by 7 wickets
Lancaster Park, Christchurch
Umpires: Steve Bucknor and Steve Randell
Player of the match: Mushtaq Ahmed (Pak)

18 March 1992
Scorecard

Zimbabwe; 134 (46.1 overs)	v	England; 125 (49.1 overs)
David Houghton 29 (74); Ian Botham 3/23 (10 overs)		Alec Stewart 29 (96); Eddo Brandes 4/21 (10 overs)

Zimbabwe won by 9 runs
Lavington Sports Oval, Albury
Umpires: Brian Aldridge and Khizer Hayat
Player of the match: Eddo Brandes (Zim)

18 March 1992
Scorecard

Australia; 216/6 (50 overs)	v	West Indies; 159 (42.4 overs)
David Boon 100 (147); Andy Cummins 3/38 (10 overs)		Brian Lara 70 (97); Mike Whitney 4/34 (10 overs)

Australia won by 57 runs
Melbourne Cricket Ground, Melbourne
Umpires: Piloo Reporter and David Shepherd
Player of the match: David Boon (Aus)

== Knockout stage ==
=== Summary ===
In the first semi-final, Pakistan defeated tournament favourites New Zealand in a high-scoring match to win their first semi-final in four attempts and book a place in the World Cup Final for the first time. New Zealand batted first and scored 262. Their captain Martin Crowe was injured while scoring 91, and opted to let John Wright captain during Pakistan's innings rather than risk aggravating the injury, which was seen as a mistake in hindsight. When Inzamam-ul-Haq came in to bat, Pakistan still needed 123 from 15 overs. He smashed 60 runs in 37 balls in the chase to achieve the target with one over remaining and also won the Man of the Match award.

In the second semi-final between South Africa and England, the match ended in controversial circumstances when, after a 10-minute rain delay, the most productive overs method revised South Africa's target from 22 runs from 13 balls to an impossible 21 runs from one ball. This rule was replaced for One Day International matches in Australia after the World Cup as a result of this incident, and it was eventually superseded by the Duckworth–Lewis method for the 1999 World Cup onwards. According to the late Bill Frindall, had the Duckworth–Lewis method been applied at that rain interruption, the revised target would have been four runs to tie or five to win from the final ball. However, the Duckworth-Lewis method would also have changed the target earlier in the day, due to earlier rain interruptions.

=== Bracket ===
Semi-finals
21 March – Auckland, New Zealand
New Zealand	262/7
Pakistan	264/6
22 March – Sydney, Australia
England	252/6
South Africa	232/6

Final
25 March – Melbourne, Australia
Pakistan	249/6
England	227

=== Semi-finals ===
21 March 1992
Scorecard

New Zealand; 262/7 (50 overs)	v	Pakistan; 264/6 (49 overs)
Martin Crowe 91 (83); Wasim Akram 2/40 (10 overs); Mushtaq Ahmed 2/40 (10 overs)		Inzamam-ul-Haq 60 (37); Willie Watson 2/39 (10 overs)

Pakistan won by 4 wickets
Eden Park, Auckland
Umpires: Steve Bucknor (WI) and David Shepherd (Eng)
Player of the match: Inzamam-ul-Haq (Pak)

- New Zealand won the toss and elected to bat.
- Pakistan qualified for the final for the first time.

22 March 1992
Scorecard

England; 252/6 (45 overs)	v	South Africa; 232/6 (43 overs)
Graeme Hick 83 (90); Meyrick Pringle 2/36 (9 overs)		Andrew Hudson 46 (52); Richard Illingworth 2/46 (10 overs)

England won by 19 runs
Sydney Cricket Ground, Sydney
Umpires: Brian Aldridge (NZ) and Steve Randell (Aus)
Player of the match: Graeme Hick (Eng)

- South Africa won the toss and elected to field.
- Rain interrupted play before the last ball of the 43rd over when South Africa required 22 runs off 13 balls to win. With two overs lost due to rain, the target was reduced to 21 runs from only 1 ball using the Most Productive Overs method.
- A slow over rate by South Africa saw both teams' innings reduced to 45 overs.
- The SCG scoreboard and the TV coverage incorrectly displayed South Africa needing 22 off 7 balls, then 22 off 1 ball: the actual requirement to win was 21 off 1 ball.
- A modern Duckworth/Lewis calculation would have first set South Africa a target of 276 in 45 overs, and then reduced this to 259 from 43 overs. (Note: The increased target under the Duckworth-Lewis method reflects the difference in resources with England losing their final five overs due to a slow over rate by South Africa against South Africa losing their first five overs.)
- England qualified for the final for the third time after 1979 and 1987.

=== Final ===
25 March 1992
Scorecard

Pakistan; 249/6 (50 overs)	v	England; 227 (49.2 overs)
Imran Khan 72 (110); Derek Pringle 3/22 (10 overs)		Neil Fairbrother 62 (70); Mushtaq Ahmed 3/41 (10 overs)

Pakistan won by 22 runs
Melbourne Cricket Ground, Melbourne
Umpires: Brian Aldridge (NZ) and Steve Bucknor (WI)
Player of the match: Wasim Akram (Pak)

- Pakistan won the toss and elected to bat.
- This was Imran Khan's last ODI.

In a thrilling final, Pakistan beat England by 22 runs at the Melbourne Cricket Ground (MCG). Derek Pringle took two early wickets for England before Imran Khan and Javed Miandad added 139 for the third wicket to steady the Pakistan innings – although both were very slow to score early on, and Imran benefited from a dropped catch just as he was trying to increase the tempo, having up to that point scored only 9 in 16 overs. He went on to score 72. At the 25 over mark, Pakistan had only scored 70, but accelerated the score to 139 by the 31st over as Javed Miandad summoned a runner, and he and Imran Khan built a steady partnership. During his innings, Imran hit a huge six off Richard Illingworth that landed far back into the members section. Imran played a captain's innings, getting a score of 72 and Miandad 58 to steady the innings, expectedly followed by an onslaught from Inzamam (42) and Wasim Akram (33) enabling Pakistan to give England a fighting target of 250.

England's start was shaky. Ian Botham was dismissed for a duck by Wasim Akram, followed by Alec Stewart, Hick and Gooch, which left England tumbling at 69/4. A solid partnership of 71 between Allan Lamb and Neil Fairbrother caused Imran to give an early second spell to his main pacer Wasim Akram in the 35th over. The decision wrote the fate of the match. Two deliveries from the left arm fast bowler dismissed Allan Lamb and Chris Lewis. Soon Fairbrother was caught by Moin Khan off Aaqib Javed to seal England's fate. Imran Khan had the final say, when he had Richard Illingworth caught by Ramiz Raja off his bowling to finish the final and crown Pakistan World Champions.

This also remains as the only World Cup Final to be played during the week, being played on a Wednesday.

== Statistics ==
Leading run scorers
Matches	Player	Team	Runs
9	Martin Crowe	New Zealand	456
9	Javed Miandad	Pakistan	437
8	Peter Kirsten	South Africa	410
8	David Boon	Australia	368
8	Ramiz Raja	Pakistan	349

Leading wicket takers
Matches	Player	Team	Wickets
10	Wasim Akram	Pakistan	18
10	Ian Botham	England	16
9	Mushtaq Ahmed	Pakistan	16
9	Chris Harris	New Zealand	16
8	Eddo Brandes	Zimbabwe	14

== Tactical innovations ==
A notable feature of this World Cup was the innovative tactics employed by New Zealand captain Martin Crowe, who opened his team's bowling with spin bowler Dipak Patel, rather than with a fast bowler, as is usual practice. Another innovation was the then-unorthodox ploy of opening the batting with "pinch hitters", such as New Zealand's Mark Greatbatch. These innovations reversed the immediate prior form of New Zealand who had lost 3–0 in their most recent series against England, with one commentator writing, "Without a host of world-class performers, New Zealand got crafty instead".
