= Kevin Duers =

Zimbabwean cricketer (born 1960)

Personal information
- Born: Lusaka, Northern Rhodesia
- Batting: Right-handed
- Bowling: Right-arm medium-fast

Career statistics
Competition	ODI
Matches	6
Runs scored	7
Batting average	7.00
100s/50s	0/0
Top score	5
Balls bowled	50
Wickets	3
Bowling average	85.33
5 wickets in innings	0
10 wickets in match	0
Best bowling	1/17
Catches/stumpings	2/–
- Source: Cricinfo, 2 May 2006

Kevin Gary Duers (born 30 June 1960) is a former Zimbabwean cricketer. He played six One Day Internationals (ODIs) for Zimbabwe in 1992. After the 1992 Cricket World Cup, he retired from cricket due to an injury. He now coaches at local teams as well as the Essex youth teams in England. He was born at Lusaka in what was then Northern Rhodesia in 1960.
