= Berri Oval =

Cricket ground in South Australia

Coordinates: 34°17′09.87″S 140°36′20.86″E

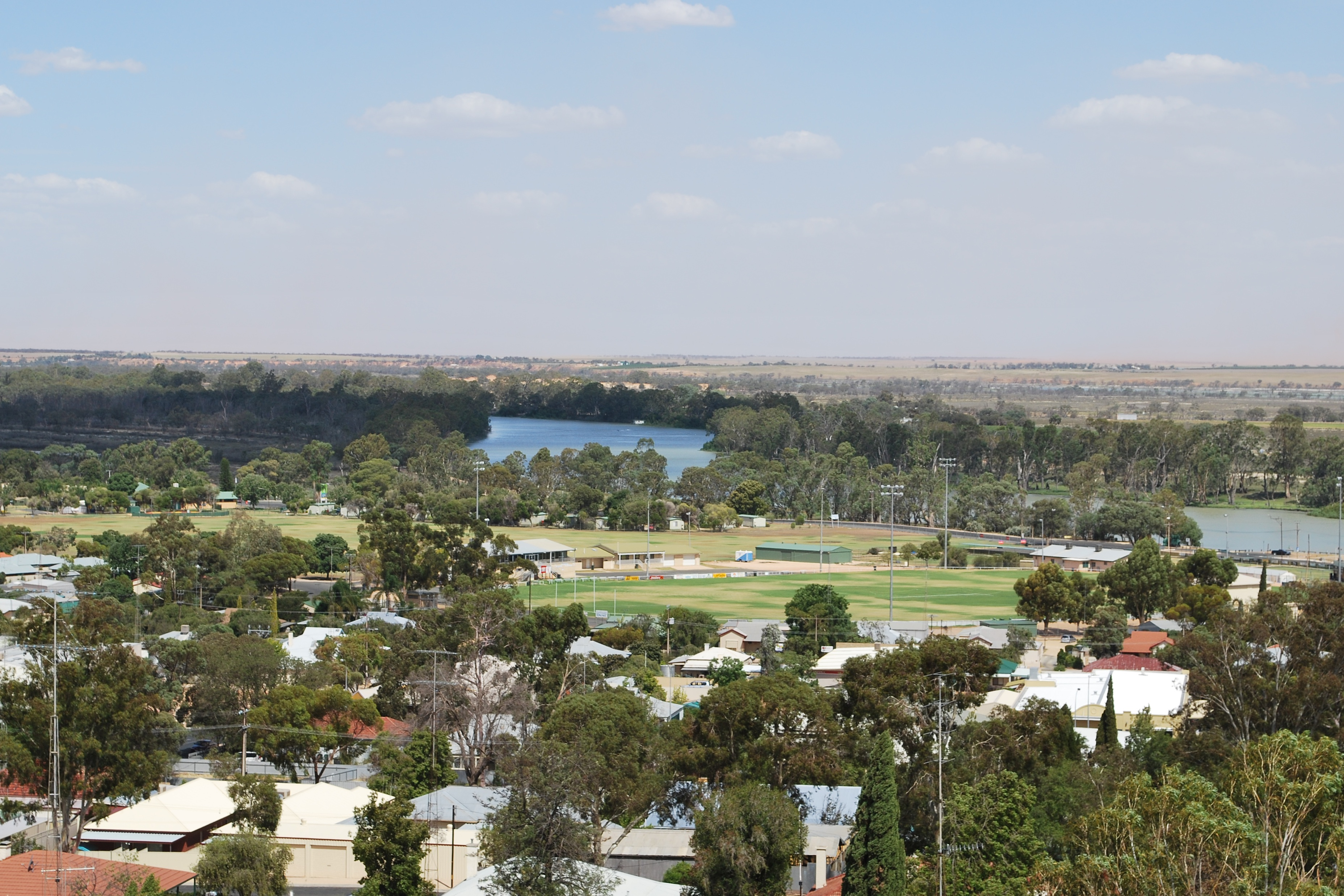
- Interactive map of Berri Oval

Ground information
- Location: Berri, Australia
- Country: Australia
- Establishment: 1961 (first recorded match)
- Capacity: 5,000

International information
- Only men's ODI: 13 March 1992: Sri Lanka v West Indies
- As of 21 October 2011; Source: Ground profile

Berri Oval is a cricket ground in the town of Berri, South Australia, Australia.

The first recorded match on the ground came when South Australia Country XI played the touring West Indians in 1961. A number of Youth One Day Internationals were held at the ground in the late 1980s.

Having never previously held a senior cricket match, it was selected as venue for the 1992 Cricket World Cup, staging a One Day International between Sri Lanka and the West Indies. This match, which is also the only List A game to be staged there, resulted in a West Indies win by 91 runs. Senior cricket hasn't returned to the ground since.

In the summer, it is home to the local cricket club the Berri Demons, while in the winter, the football club (also known as the Demons) plays there.

In August 2003, Greek football club Panathinaikos played the Australian Australs at the ground as part of the International Soccer Challenge.

The oval has also seen three Australian Football League (AFL) preseason games played, all three of which featured Adelaide. The opponents were Geelong (1998), Port Adelaide (2004) and Hawthorn (2009).

Numerous SANFL matches have also been played at the Berri Oval.

== ODI centuries ==
The following table summarises the ODI centuries scored at Berri Oval.

No.	Score	Player	Team	Balls	Inns.	Opposing team	Date	Result
1	110	Phil Simmons	West Indies	125	1	Sri Lanka	13 March 1992	Won
