= Average Run Rate method =

Mathematical cricket match scoring formulation

The Average Run Rate (ARR) method was a mathematical formulation designed to calculate the target score for the team batting second in a limited overs cricket match interrupted by weather or other circumstances. Often matches interrupted by weather would use reserve days, bowl outs, or be replayed on another date, but if logistics did not allow these, the ARR method would be used.

The ARR method was used from the start of one-day cricket in the 1950s and 1960s until it was replaced by the Most Productive Overs method in 1991.

== Calculation ==
If an interruption meant that the team batting second lost some of their overs, their target score was adjusted as follows.

$$\text{Team 2's new target }=\text{ (Team 1's Average Run Rate achieved} \times \text{Overs available to Team 2)} + 1.$$

This meant that Team 2 just had to match the average run rate achieved by Team 1 in the overs it had available. For example, if Team 1 made 250 in their 50 overs, which was an ARR of 5 runs per over, and Team 2's innings was reduced to 25 overs, Team 2's new target was (5 x 25) + 1 = 126.

This formula could alternatively be written as:

$$\text{Team 2's new target } = \left({\text{Team 1's total} \times \frac{\text{Overs available to Team 2}}{\text{Overs used by Team 1}}} \right)+1.$$

In other words, the target was reduced in proportion to the loss in overs. Using the same example as above, with this formula the new target for Team 2 was (250 x 25/50) + 1 = 126.

== Criticisms ==
There are four intrinsic flaws in the method:

- Firstly, it frequently altered the balance of the match, usually in favour of the team batting second (Team 2): as it was easier to maintain the given run rate for a reduced number of overs, less care needed to be taken to preserve wickets, meaning a revised target was easier to achieve.
- Secondly, the method took no consideration of wickets lost, but the scoring rate of Team 2 when the match was interrupted. For example, if Team 2 were 126–9 from 25 overs in reply to a score of 250 from 50 overs, they would be declared the winner despite being on the brink of being bowled out and facing a heavy defeat.
- Thirdly, there was no compensation to Team 1 if they unexpectedly lost overs which they were expecting to be able to score from.
- Fourthly, if Team 2's innings was interrupted, the current match situation would become irrelevant in the calculation of the revised target.

Two subsequent modifications were used: increasing the required run rate by 0.5% for each over lost, and recalculating the target using the run rate after excluding maiden overs, with the revised target given by the next highest integer.

While these modifications reduced Team 2's advantage, partially addressing the first intrinsic flaw, these modifications also failed to address the other intrinsic flaws of the method.

Further to the above, each modification had its own intrinsic flaws:

- The first modification resulted in a parabola equation:

$$\text{Team 2's new target}=\text{Team 1's Average Run Rate} \times \text{Overs available to Team 2} \times \text{(1.25 - 0.005 * Overs available to Team 2))) + 1}.$$

A parabola equation is a poor fit for one-day cricket scoring, and this equation also has a turning point at 125 overs, which is counterintuitive.

- The second modification effectively penalised Team 2 for good bowling, and if the number of maidens bowled was equal to or greater than the number of overs lost, it would set Team 2 the same or a higher target than Team 1 scored, but with fewer overs to face.

== Notable matches decided by ARR ==
- England v Sri Lanka in the 1987 Cricket World Cup: England scored 296 from 50 overs. After a delay due to rain, Sri Lanka's innings was reduced to 45 overs, giving them a revised target of 267 (296 x 45/50 = 266.4). Sri Lanka finished at 158-8.

In this match, the later Duckworth-Lewis-Stern method would have reset Sri Lanka's target to 282.

- Australia v West Indies, third final of the 1988-89 World Series Cup: Australia scored 226 from 38 overs. Chasing 227 to win, the West Indies were 47−2 after 6.4 overs, needing 180 runs from 31.2 overs (a required RR of 5.74), when rain stopped play for 85 minutes.

When play restarted, the West Indies' innings was reduced to 18 overs, giving them a revised target of 108 (226 x 18/38 = 107.1), meaning they needed 61 runs from 11.2 overs (a required RR of 5.38). The West Indies won the match (and the competition) with 4.4 overs remaining and eight wickets in hand.
This revised target gave the West Indies a major advantage, as it significantly reduced the number of overs they needed to maintain a given run rate and reduced their required run rate. Australian fans loudly booed this unsatisfactory conclusion, and the Average Run Rate was criticised by the media and Australian captain Allan Border, which led to Australia developing the Most Productive Overs method.
In this match, the later Duckworth-Lewis-Stern method would have increased the West Indies' target to 232 to take into account a two-hour rain delay during Australia's innings, and then revised the target to 139 (145 with the Professional Edition) after the second interruption.
