= Meyrick Pringle =

South African cricketer

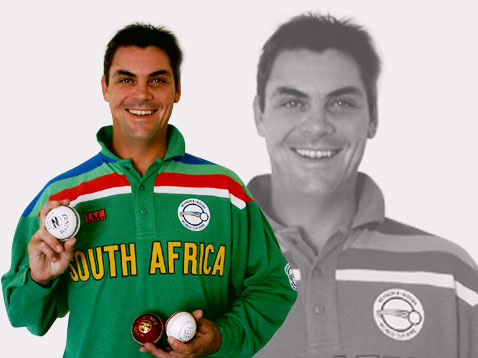

Personal information
- Born: 22 June 1966 (age 60); Adelaide, Cape Province, South Africa
- Height: 194 cm (6 ft 4 in)
- Batting: Right-handed
- Bowling: Right-arm fast-medium
- Role: Bowler

International information
- National side: South Africa (1992–1995)
- Test debut (cap 242): 18 April 1992 v West Indies
- Last Test: 30 November 1995 v England
- ODI debut (cap 16): 26 February 1992 v Australia
- Last ODI: 18 October 1994 v Australia

Domestic team information
- Years: Team
- 1985–1986: Orange Free State
- 1987–1988: Sussex
- 1988–1989: Eastern Province
- 1989–1997: Western Province
- 1997–2002: Eastern Province

Career statistics
Competition	Tests	ODIs	FC	LA
Matches	4	17	119	177
Runs scored	67	48	2,189	718
Batting average	16.75	9.59	17.37	11.90
100s/50s	0/0	0/0	1/7	0/0
Top score	33	13*	105	39*
Balls bowled	652	870	23,577	8,592
Wickets	5	22	429	225
Bowling average	54.00	27.45	25.35	25.40
5 wickets in innings	0	0	15	2
10 wickets in match	0	0	3	0
Best bowling	2/62	4/11	7/60	6/30
Catches/stumpings	0/0	2/0	42/0	36/0
- Source: Cricinfo, 25 January 2006

Meyrick Wayne Pringle (born 22 June 1966) is a former South African cricketer who played in four Tests and seventeen One Day Internationals (ODIs) from 1992 to 1995.

== Career ==
Pringle attended and played for Kingswood College at school level. After matriculating in 1984 Pringle started playing provincial cricket for a number of teams, including Orange Free State (1985–1986), Sussex (1987–1998), Eastern Province (1988–1989), Western Province (1990–1998) and Eastern Province again (1998–2002).

Pringle made his ODI debut for South Africa against Australia at the 1992 Cricket World Cup, and at the same tournament had the best bowling performance of his career, taking four wickets for eleven runs against the West indies, a performance which earned him the man of the match award.

He made his Test debut later that same year on South Africa's tour to the West Indies, the first Test played by South Africa since the lifting of sporting sanctions after the end of Apartheid. Pringle took 2/105 in that match. In the following series against India at home, Pringle was injured during the second Test match in Johannesburg. On the second day of the match, Pringle was batting when Indian fast bowler Javagal Srinath bowled him a bouncer which struck him on the eye. Pringle fell to the ground and was forced to retire hurt, being carried off the field on a stretcher. He would not play again until 1995, when he played his final Test match against England.

Pringle announced his retirement from international cricket in 1996 having played four Tests and 17 ODIs for South Africa.

== Coaching ==
After his retirement Pringle coached and assisted in Holland and Namibia before being appointed coaching director at the Jaipur Cricket Academy. He was appointed as Rajasthan's bowling coach on 5 December 2011 then came on board on a full-time basis for 2012/2013 Pringle is currently consulting at all levels of cricket around the world in all formats of the game. Meyrick is also a Freelancing TV broadcaster (Commentator) (Studio Guest)

== Pringle Foundation ==
In 2009 Pringle started the Pringle Sports & Education Foundation with his cousin Grant Pringle. The foundation is aimed at establishing a system that ensures underprivileged children receive education and sports training. The foundation is also involved in coaching clinics, club and school development and is also looking at working on international scholarship exchanges between various countries such as India.

== Commentating ==
In 2013 South African Sport TV Broadcaster SuperSport (South African broadcaster) launched an IsiXhosa language Channel option for Xhosa viewers in South Africa. Pringle, who is fluent in Xhosa, was asked to join the isiXhosa commentating team. With the start of the Champions Trophy cricket tournament which took place in June 2013, the new language channel did phenomenally well and since to date Pringle has become a controversial figure being the first white male South African to commentate in a South African native language. There has been a tremendous incline of viewers in the channel option and even the viewers have been amazed with the outcome of Pringle's commentating. Pringle's new apparent nickname in the studios is White Sangoma meaning "White Doctor".
