= Aamer Sohail =

Pakistani former cricketer

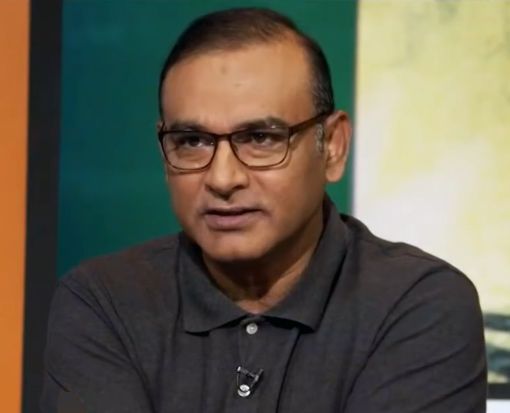
- Aamer Sohail in 2019

Personal information
- Full name: Mohammad Aamer Sohail Ali
- Born: 14 September 1966 (age 60); Lahore, Punjab, Pakistan
- Height: 5 ft 10 in (178 cm)
- Batting: Left-handed
- Bowling: Slow left-arm orthodox

International information
- National side: Pakistan
- Test debut (cap 122): 4 June 1992 v England
- Last Test: 5 March 2000 v Sri Lanka
- ODI debut (cap 80): 21 December 1990 v Sri Lanka
- Last ODI: 19 February 2000 v Sri Lanka

Domestic team information
- Years: Team
- 1983–1999: Lahore
- 1987–1992: Habib Bank Limited
- 1995–2001: Allied Bank Limited
- 1998–1999: Karachi
- 2000–2001: Lahore
- 2001: Somerset

Career statistics
Competition	Test	ODI	FC	LA
Matches	47	156	195	261
Runs scored	2,823	4,780	12,213	7,852
Batting average	35.28	31.86	38.89	31.91
100s/50s	5/13	5/31	29/50	9/50
Top score	205	134	205	134
Balls bowled	2,383	4,836	12,063	7,840
Wickets	25	85	157	179
Bowling average	41.96	43.56	38.10	33.34
5 wickets in innings	0	0	2	0
10 wickets in match	0	0	1	0
Best bowling	4/54	4/22	7/53	4/11
Catches/stumpings	36/–	49/–	153/–	92/–
Medal record
Men's Cricket
Representing Pakistan
ICC Cricket World Cup
Winner	1992 Australia and New Zealand
- Source: CricketArchive, 30 March 2010

Mohammad Aamer Sohail Ali (Urdu: محمد عامر سہیل علی; born 14 September 1966) is a Pakistani cricket commentator and former cricketer. In a playing career that spanned ten years, Sohail played in 195 first-class and 261 List A Limited Overs matches, including 47 Test matches and 156 One Day Internationals for Pakistan. He was a part of the Pakistani squad which won the 1992 Cricket World Cup.

An aggressive left-handed opening batsman, in ODIs he has won 14 Player of the Match awards out of 156 matches, thus winning a POTM every 11.1 matches, the highest ratio in this format for Pakistan when it comes to retired players, not far behind his opening partner Saeed Anwar (28 in 247 matches or a ratio of 8.8).

== Domestic career ==
Sohail made his first-class debut in 1983, a left-handed opening batsman and occasional left-arm spin bowler.

== International career ==
=== Early years ===
An aggressive batsman, Sohail first appeared for the national team in a 1990 one-day International against Sri Lanka and enjoyed a successful international career. He was an important member of the team that won the 1992 Cricket World Cup in Australia and New Zealand. He was made Player of the Match for his 76 against Australia in a low-scoring group match, Sohail being the top-scorer and hitting the only half-century of the match for either side in a must-win game that kickstarted Pakistan's 1992 World Cup campaign.

During the 1992 Pakistan tour of England, he hit his highest Test score of 205 at a healthy strike rate of 72 during the third Test in Old Trafford, and his innings is still considered as one of the best by an Asian batsman in overseas conditions.

=== Captaincy ===
Sohail captained Pakistan in six Tests in 1998, becoming the first Pakistani captain to defeat South Africa in a Test Match. He led Pakistan through 22 One Day Internationals from 1996 to 1998, winning nine and averaging 41.5 with the bat. He also acted as acting captain of Pakistan against West Indies in Sharjah.

== Post-retirement ==
=== Cricket administration ===
After retiring from cricket in 2001, Sohail became chief selector for the national team, his tenure ending in January 2004 when he was replaced by former national team wicketkeeper Wasim Bari. He continues to work as a cricket broadcaster. On 4 February 2014, he was again appointed as chief selector of the national team for the second time.

=== Politics ===
On 18 August 2011, Sohail announced that he had joined Nawaz Sharif's political party, the Pakistan Muslim League (N). According to Sohail, the country needs seasoned and experienced leadership which he believes the PML-N offers.

Preceded by Rameez Raja	Pakistan Cricket Captain; 1998–1999	Succeeded by Wasim Akram
