= Mark Greatbatch =

New Zealand cricketer

Personal information
- Full name: Mark John Greatbatch
- Born: 11 December 1963 (age 62); Auckland, New Zealand
- Batting: Left-handed
- Bowling: Right-arm medium
- Role: Opening batter

International information
- National side: New Zealand (1988–1996)
- Test debut (cap 165): 25 February 1988 v England
- Last Test: 28 November 1996 v Pakistan
- ODI debut (cap 60): 9 March 1988 v England
- Last ODI: 8 December 1996 v Pakistan

Domestic team information
- Years: Team
- 1982/83–1985/86: Auckland
- 1986/87–1999/00: Central Districts

Career statistics
Competition	Test	ODI	FC	LA
Matches	41	84	170	175
Runs scored	2,021	2,206	9,890	4,678
Batting average	30.62	28.28	37.89	29.98
100s/50s	3/10	2/13	24/43	2/34
Top score	146*	111	202*	111
Balls bowled	6	6	171	13
Wickets	0	0	1	0
Bowling average	–	–	149.00	–
5 wickets in innings	–	–	0	–
10 wickets in match	–	–	0	–
Best bowling	–	–	1/23	–
Catches/stumpings	27/–	35/–	144/–	82/–
- Source: Cricinfo, 7 May 2017

Mark John Greatbatch (born 11 December 1963) is a former New Zealand international cricketer. He scored more than 2,000 runs in his 41 Test matches for New Zealand. A left-handed batsman and occasional right-arm medium pace bowler in first class cricket for Auckland and Central Districts, Greatbatch scored 9,890 first class runs in total as well as being an occasional wicket keeper.

== International career ==
Greatbatch highest test score of 146 not out off 485 balls was against Australia at Perth in November 1989. Greatbatch was at the crease for 11 hours (2 days) to save New Zealand from defeat, the game ending in a draw because of his efforts. He received a standing ovation at the end of the game.

For the 1992 Cricket World Cup Greatbatch was not selected to play in the first match, against Australia. However, he was selected to open against South Africa in place of John Wright, who had been injured, and proceeded to bat to take advantage of fielding restrictions early in the innings. The strategy worked, so was repeated again throughout the World Cup and Greatbatch became one of the first 'pinch hitter' players to open an innings in One Day Internationals.

Mark Greatbatch finished his career with 2,021 Test runs and 2,206 ODI runs.

== After cricket ==
In September 2005 he became director of coaching at Warwickshire County Cricket Club in England. After relegation from both the County Championship and Pro40 League in 2007 he was replaced by Ashley Giles. In January, 2010, Greatbatch was appointed the coach of the New Zealand national cricket team.

In 2022, Asterix, a horse that Greatbatch partly owned, won the New Zealand Derby.
