= Dooland Buultjens =

Sri Lankan cricket umpire (1933–2004)

Personal information
- Full name: Dooland Philip Buultjens
- Born: 23 August 1933; Mullaitivu, Sri Lanka
- Died: 25 April 2004 (aged 70)
- Role: Umpire

Umpiring information
- Tests umpired: 3 (1984–1986)
- ODIs umpired: 18 (1983–1992)
- Source: Cricinfo, 2 July 2013

Dooland Philip Buultjens (23 August 1933 – 25 April 2004) was a Sri Lankan cricket umpire. He officiated in 21 international matches, including three Test matches between 1984 and 1986 and 18 ODI games between 1983 and 1992.

== See also ==
- List of Test cricket umpires
- List of One Day International cricket umpires
