= Sri Lanka national cricket team record by opponent =

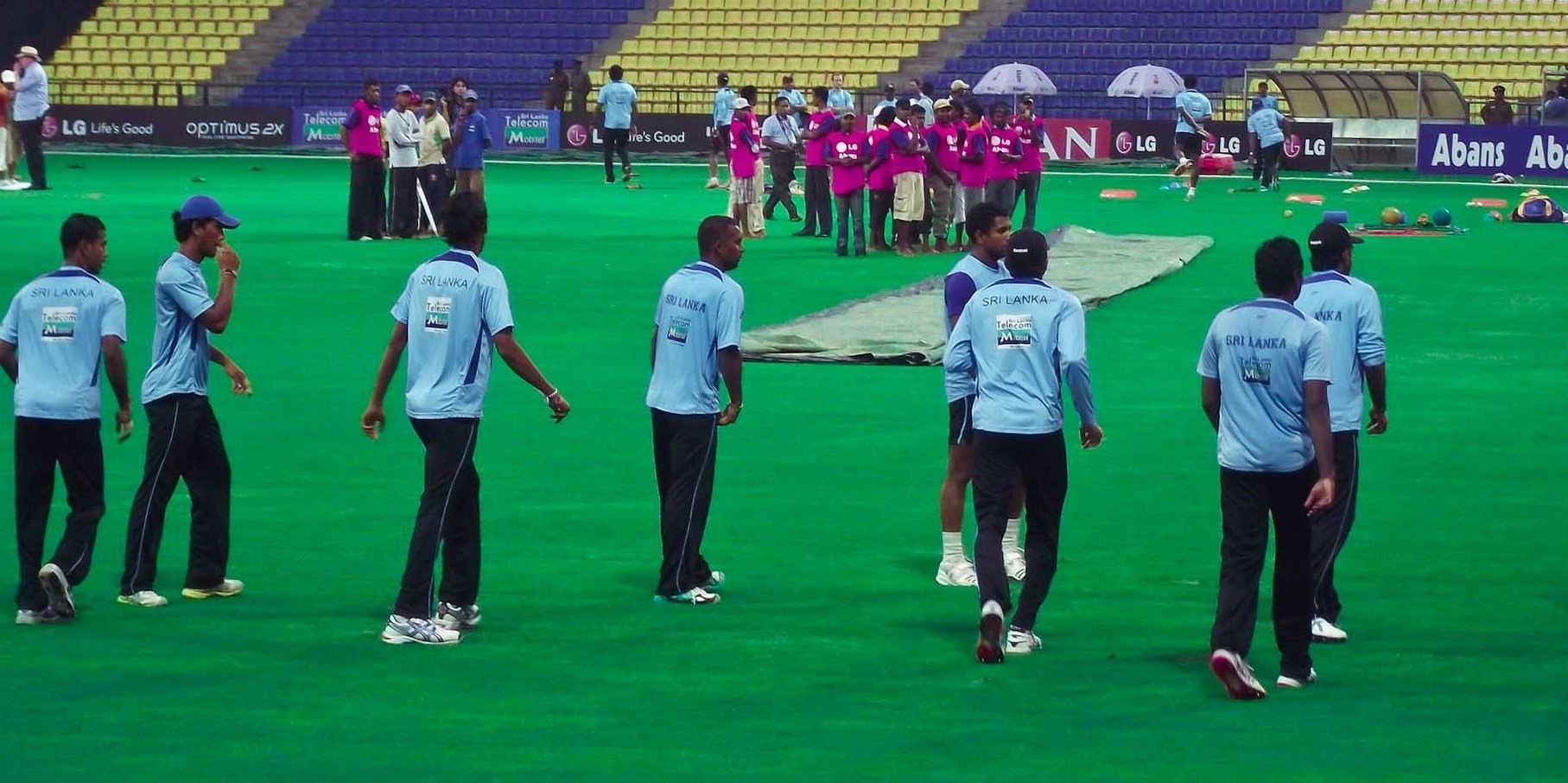
Sri Lanka Cricket Team Practicing at Pallekele

The Sri Lanka national cricket team represents Sri Lanka in international cricket and is a full member of the International Cricket Council (ICC) with Test and One Day International (ODI) status. Sri Lanka first competed in international cricket in 1975, when they played against West Indies during 1975 Cricket World Cup; West Indies won the match by 9 wickets at Old Trafford, Manchester, England.

After Sri Lanka awarded Test status on 17 February 1982 as eighth Test playing nation, they had to wait until 6 September 1985, where Sri Lanka recorded their first Test win by beating India, in the second match of the series by 149 runs at the P Sara Oval, Colombo. As of 27 July 2019, Sri Lanka have played 283 Test matches; they have won 90 matches, lost 107 matches, and 85 matches were drawn. They have also won the 2001-02 Asian Test Championship, defeating Pakistan in the final by an innings and 175 runs.

Sri Lanka registered their first ODI win against India at Manchester, England, on 16 June 1979. As of 29 July 2019, Sri Lanka have played 846 ODI matches, winning 385 matches and losing 419; they also tied 5 matches, whilst 37 had no result. They also won the 1996 Cricket World Cup, co-champions in 2002 ICC Champions Trophy and also became five times Asian champions in 1986, 1997, 2004, 2008 and 2014.

Sri Lanka played their first Twenty20 International (T20I) match at the Rose Bowl, on 15 June 2006, against England, winning the match by 2 runs. In 2014, they won the 2014 ICC World Twenty20, defeating India by 6 wickets. As of July 2019, Sri Lanka have played 114 T20I matches and won 55 of them; 56 were lost and 2 tied and 1 no result match as well. They have won the 2014 ICC World Twenty20 championship in Bangladesh and was runner-up in two previous occasions. (2009, 2012).

As of July 2019, Sri Lanka have faced major nine teams in Test cricket instead of Ireland and Afghanistan, with their most frequent opponent being Pakistan, playing 53 matches against them. Sri Lanka have registered more wins against Pakistan and Bangladesh than any other team, with 16. In ODI matches, Sri Lanka have played against 17 teams; they have played against India most frequently, with a winning percentage of 38.17 in 159 matches. Within usual major ODI nations, Sri Lanka have defeated Pakistan on 58 occasions, which is their best record in ODIs. The team have competed against 15 countries in T20Is, and have played 18 matches against Pakistan. Sri Lanka have defeated Australia 8 occasions, which is their best win record against opponents. Sri Lanka was the best T20I team in the world, where they ranked number one in more than 32 months, and reached World Twenty20 final in three times.

== Key ==
- M – Number of matches played
- W – Number of matches won
- L – Number of matches lost
- T – Number of matches tied
- D – Number of matches ended in a draw
- NR – Number of matches ended with no result
- Tie+W – Number of matches tied and then won in a tiebreaker such as a bowl-out or Super Over
- Tie+L – Number of matches tied and then lost in a tiebreaker such as a bowl-out or Super Over
- Win% – Percentage of games won to those played (Note: Games that did not have a result are not taken into consideration while calculating the result percentage. Ties are counted as half a win.)
- Loss% – Percentage of games lost to those played
- Draw% – Percentage of games drawn to those played
- First – Year of the first match played by Sri Lanka against the country
- Last – Year of the last match played by Sri Lanka against the country

== Test cricket ==
Statistics are correct as of 30 August 2024

Team	Opponent	1st Test	Last Test	Matches	Won	Lost	Drawn	Tied	% Won
Sri Lanka	Australia	22 April 1983	1 February 2019	33	5	20	8	0	15.15
Sri Lanka	Bangladesh	6 September 2001	8 February 2018	26	20	1	5	0	76.92
Sri Lanka	England	17 February 1982	22 January 2021	38	8	18	11	0	21.05
Sri Lanka	India	17 September 1982	2 December 2017	46	7	22	17	0	15.21
Sri Lanka	New Zealand	4 March 1983	22 August 2019	38	9	18	11	0	23.68
Sri Lanka	Pakistan	5 March 1982	6 August 2017	59	17	23	18	0	28.81
Sri Lanka	South Africa	25 August 1993	3 January 2021	31	9	16	6	0	29.03
Sri Lanka	West Indies	8 December 1993	21 March 2021	24	11	4	9	0	45.83
Sri Lanka	Zimbabwe	11 October 1994	27 January 2020	20	14	0	6	0	70.00
Sri Lanka	Total			294	92	113	89	0	31.29
Sri Lanka	Last updated: 30 August 2024.								

== One Day International ==
Statistics are correct as of 30 August 2024

Team	Opponent	1st ODI	Last ODI	Matches	Won	Lost	Tied	No result	% Won
Sri Lanka	Afghanistan	3 March 2014	14 February 2024	15	10	4	0	1	66.66
Sri Lanka	Australia	11 June 1975	15 June 2019	103	35	64	0	4	33.98
Sri Lanka	Bangladesh	2 April 1986	25 May 2021	57	43	12	0	2	75.43
Sri Lanka	Bermuda	15 March 2007	15 March 2007	1	1	0	0	0	100.00
Sri Lanka	Canada	19 February 2003	20 February 2011	2	2	0	0	0	100.00
Sri Lanka	England	13 February 1982	21 June 2019	79	37	38	1	3	46.83
Sri Lanka	India	16–18 June 1979	17 December 2017	171	59	99	2	11	34.50
Sri Lanka	Ireland	18 April 2007	18 June 2016	5	5	0	0	0	100.00
Sri Lanka	Kenya	6 March 1996	1 March 2011	6	5	1	0	0	83.33
Sri Lanka	Netherlands	16 September 2002	6 July 2006	6	6	0	0	0	100.00
Sri Lanka	New Zealand	9 June 1979	1 June 2019	102	41	52	1	8	40.19
Sri Lanka	Pakistan	14 June 1975	2 October 2019	157	59	93	1	4	37.57
Sri Lanka	Scotland	13 July 2011	29 April 2019	4	4	0	0	0	100.00
Sri Lanka	South Africa	2 March 1992	16 March 2019	81	33	46	1	1	40.74
Sri Lanka	United Arab Emirates	17 July 2004	26 June 2008	2	2	0	0	0	100.00
Sri Lanka	West Indies	7 June 1975	1 March 2020	64	30	31	0	3	50.87
Sri Lanka	Zimbabwe	23 February 1992	21 January 2018	64	49	12	0	3	80.00
Sri Lanka	Total			856	389	425	5	37	45.44
Source: Cricinfo. Last updated: 1 March 2020.

== Twenty20 International ==
Statistics are correct as of 26 June 2021

Team	Opponent	1st T20I	Last T20I	Matches	Won	Lost	Tied	No result	% Won
Sri Lanka	Afghanistan	17 March 2016	3 September 2022	3	2	1	0	0	66.67
Sri Lanka	Australia	20 September 2007	1 November 2019	16	8	8	0	0	50.00
Sri Lanka	Bangladesh	18 September 2007	16 March 2018	11	7	4	0	0	63.63
Sri Lanka	Canada	12 October 2008		1	1	0	0	0	100.00
Sri Lanka	England	15 June 2006	26 June 2021	12	4	8	0	0	33.33
Sri Lanka	India	10 February 2009	10 January 2020	19	5	13	0	1	27.77
Sri Lanka	Ireland	14 June 2009		1	1	0	0	0	100.00
Sri Lanka	Kenya	14 September 2007		1	1	0	0	0	100.00
Sri Lanka	Pakistan	17 September 2007	9 October 2019	21	8	13	0	0	38.09
Sri Lanka	Netherlands	24 March 2014		1	1	0	0	0	100.00
Sri Lanka	New Zealand	22 December 2006	6 September 2019	19	7	10	1	1	41.66
Sri Lanka	South Africa	22 September 2012	23 March 2019	13	5	7	1	0	42.30
Sri Lanka	United Arab Emirates	25 February 2016		1	1	0	0	0	100.00
Sri Lanka	West Indies	10 June 2009	7 March 2021	14	7	7	0	0	50.00
Sri Lanka	Zimbabwe	10 October 2008	18 September 2012	3	3	0	0	0	100.00
Sri Lanka	Total			134	60	70	2	2	46.21
Source: Cricinfo. Last updated: 26 June 2021.
