= List of international cricket five-wicket hauls by Danish Kaneria =

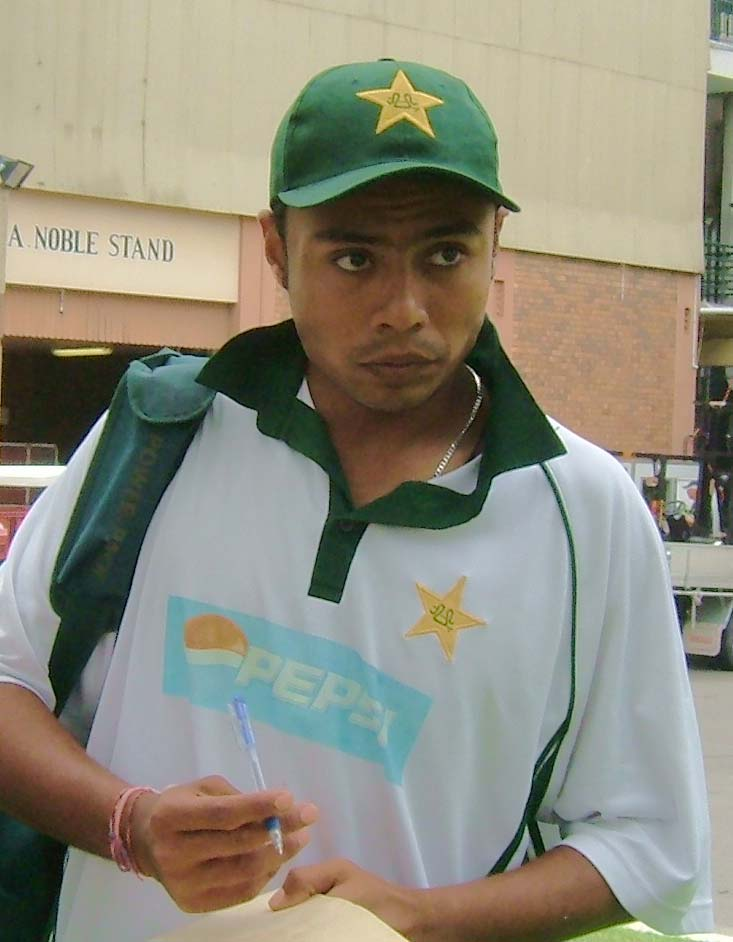
Danish Kaneria took ten wickets in a Test match twice.

In cricket, a five-wicket haul (also known as a "five–for" or "fifer") refers to a bowler taking five or more wickets in a single innings. This is regarded by critics as a notable achievement, and as of October 2024, only 54 bowlers have taken 15 or more five-wicket hauls at international level in their cricketing careers. Danish Kaneria, a right-arm leg spinner, represented the Pakistan national cricket team in 61 Tests between 2000 and 2010. He took 15 five-wicket hauls during his career in international cricket. Kaneria was described by the BBC as a "match-winner with his leg-breaks".

Kaneria made his Test debut in 2000 against England at the Iqbal Stadium, Faisalabad. His first Test five-wicket haul came the following year against Bangladesh at the Multan Cricket Stadium during the 2001–02 Asian Test Championship. Kaneria went on to take his second five-wicket haul in the same match, the only instance in his career where he did so. He accumulated 12 wickets for 94 runs in the match, and the performance earned him the man of the match award. Kaneria's best bowling figures in an innings were 7 wickets for 77 runs against Bangladesh at the Bangabandhu National Stadium, Dhaka, in January 2002. He was most successful against Australia and Bangladesh, claiming three five-wicket hauls against each of them.

Having made his One Day International (ODI) debut in 2001 against Zimbabwe at the Sharjah Cricket Stadium, Kaneria played 18 matches for Pakistan and took 15 wickets in the format. His best bowling figures in ODIs were 3 wickets for 31 runs against New Zealand at the Rangiri Dambulla International Stadium in 2003. Kaneria never played Twenty20 International matches. As of 2017, he has taken 15 five-wicket hauls in international cricket; he ranks seventh in the list for Pakistan in all formats of the game combined.

== Key ==
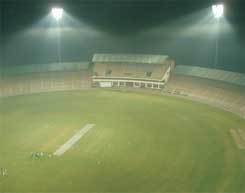
Kaneria took three of his five-wicket hauls at the Multan Cricket Stadium.

Key
| Symbol | Meaning |
|---|---|
| Date | Day the Test started |
| Inn | Innings in which the five-wicket haul was taken |
| Overs | Number of overs bowled in that innings |
| Runs | Runs conceded |
| Wkts | Number of wickets taken |
| Econ | Runs conceded per over |
| Batsmen | Batsmen whose wickets were taken |
| Result | Result for the Pakistan team |
| * | One of two five-wicket hauls by Kaneria in a match |
| † | 10 or more wickets taken in the match |
| ‡ | Kaneria was selected as man of the match |

== Test cricket five-wicket hauls ==
Five-wicket hauls in Test cricket by Danish Kaneria
| No. | Date | Ground | Against | Inn | Overs | Runs | Wkts | Econ | Batsmen | Result |
|---|---|---|---|---|---|---|---|---|---|---|
| 1 | 29 August 2001 * † ‡ | Multan Cricket Stadium, Multan | Bangladesh | 1 | 13 | 42 | 6 | 3.23 | Mehrab Hossain; Naimur Rahman; Akram Khan; Enamul Haque; Khaled Mashud; Hasibul Hossain | Won |
| 2 | 29 August 2001 * † ‡ | Multan Cricket Stadium, Multan | Bangladesh | 3 | 15 | 52 | 6 | 3.46 | Aminul Islam; Akram Khan; Naimur Rahman; Khaled Mashud; Enamul Haque; Hasibul Hossain | Won |
| 3 | 9 January 2002 | Bangabandhu National Stadium, Dhaka | Bangladesh | 3 | 19.4 | 77 | 7 | 3.91 | Mehrab Hossain; Habibul Bashar; Sanwar Hossain; Khaled Mashud; Enamul Haque; Mohammad Sharif; Fahim Muntasir | Won |
| 4 | 1 May 2002 | Gaddafi Stadium, Lahore | New Zealand | 3 | 32 | 110 | 5 | 3.43 | Lou Vincent; Stephen Fleming; Craig McMillan; Robbie Hart; Daryl Tuffey | Won |
| 5 | 17 October 2003 ‡ (Note: Kaneria shared the man of the match award with Taufeeq Umar.) | Gaddafi Stadium, Lahore | South Africa | 3 | 28.3 | 46 | 5 | 1.61 | Neil McKenzie; Gary Kirsten; Mark Boucher; Shaun Pollock; Paul Adams | Won |
| 6 | 28 October 2004 † ‡ | National Stadium, Karachi | Sri Lanka | 3 | 60 | 118 | 7 | 1.96 | Sanath Jayasuriya; Marvan Atapattu; Mahela Jayawardene; Thilan Samaraweera; Jehan Mubarak; Romesh Kaluwitharana; Farveez Maharoof | Won |
| 7 | 26 December 2004 | Melbourne Cricket Ground, Melbourne | Australia | 2 | 39.3 | 125 | 5 | 3.16 | Justin Langer; Damien Martyn; Michael Clarke; Adam Gilchrist; Glenn McGrath | Lost |
| 8 | 2 January 2005 | Sydney Cricket Ground, Sydney | Australia | 2 | 49.3 | 188 | 7 | 3.79 | Matthew Hayden; Damien Martyn; Michael Clarke; Adam Gilchrist; Shane Watson; Shane Warne; Glenn McGrath | Lost |
| 9 | 8 March 2005 | Punjab Cricket Association IS Bindra Stadium, Mohali | India | 2 | 53.4 | 150 | 6 | 2.79 | Gautam Gambhir; Sourav Ganguly; V. V. S. Laxman; Irfan Pathan; Lakshmipathy Balaji; Zaheer Khan | Drawn |
| 10 | 24 March 2005 | M. Chinnaswamy Stadium, Bangalore | India | 2 | 39 | 127 | 5 | 3.25 | Virender Sehwag; Rahul Dravid; Sourav Ganguly; Harbhajan Singh; Lakshmipathy Balaji | Won |
| 11 | 3 June 2005 ‡ | Sabina Park, Kingston | West Indies | 4 | 20 | 46 | 5 | 2.30 | Devon Smith; Ramnaresh Sarwan; Brian Lara; Shivnarine Chanderpaul; Daren Powell | Won |
| 12 | 19 November 2006 | Multan Cricket Stadium, Multan | West Indies | 2 | 46 | 181 | 5 | 3.93 | Chris Gayle; Daren Ganga; Brian Lara; Dwayne Bravo; Dave Mohammed | Drawn |
| 13 | 20 July 2009 | Sinhalese Sports Club Ground, Colombo | Sri Lanka | 2 | 20.3 | 62 | 5 | 3.02 | Mahela Jayawardene; Angelo Mathews; Chaminda Vaas; Tillakaratne Dilshan; Rangana Herath | Drawn |
| 14 | 11 December 2009 | McLean Park, Napier | New Zealand | 2 | 53 | 168 | 7 | 3.16 | Tim McIntosh; Martin Guptill; Ross Taylor; Daniel Flynn; Tim Southee; Iain O'Brien; Chris Martin | Drawn |
| 15 | 3 January 2010 | Sydney Cricket Ground, Sydney | Australia | 3 | 47.5 | 151 | 5 | 3.15 | Phillip Hughes; Marcus North; Brad Haddin; Mitchell Johnson; Doug Bollinger | Lost |
