= Danish Kaneria =

Pakistani former cricketer (born 1980)

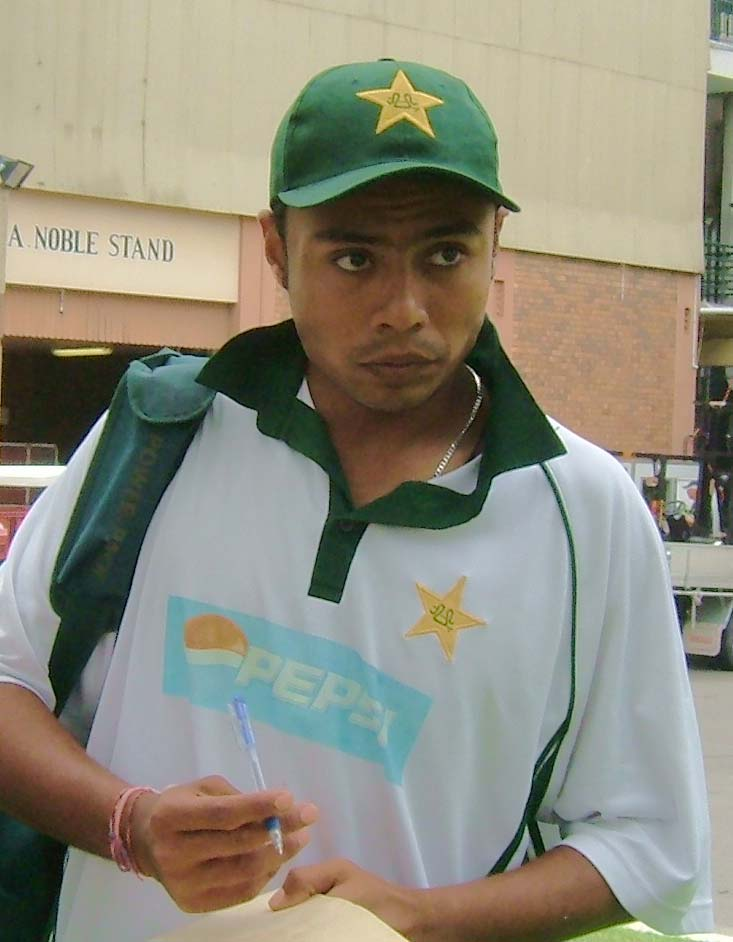
- Kaneria in 2005

Personal information
- Full name: Danish Prabhashankarbhai Kaneria
- Born: 16 December 1980 (age 45); Karachi, Sindh, Pakistan
- Nickname: Nani-Danny
- Batting: Right-handed
- Bowling: Right-arm leg break
- Relatives: Anil Dalpat (cousin)

International information
- National side: Pakistan (2000–2010)
- Test debut (cap 163): 29 November 2000 v England
- Last Test: 31 July 2010 v England
- ODI debut (cap 140): 31 October 2001 v Zimbabwe
- Last ODI: 21 March 2007 v Zimbabwe
- ODI shirt no.: 99

Domestic team information
- Years: Team
- 1998: National Shipping Corporation
- 1999–2002: Karachi Whites
- 1999: Pakistan Reserves cricket team
- 1999–2012: Habib Bank Limited
- 2004: Karachi
- 2004–2010: Essex
- 2004: Karachi Blues
- 2005–2010: Karachi Zebras
- 2007: Karachi Harbour
- 2008: Sindh
- 2008: Baluchistan Bears
- 2010: Sindh Dolphins

Career statistics
Competition	Test	ODI	FC	LA
Matches	61	18	206	167
Runs scored	360	12	1,911	379
Batting average	7.05	6.00	10.67	9.24
100s/50s	0/0	0/0	0/1	0/1
Top score	29	6*	65	64
Balls bowled	17,697	854	53,837	8,280
Wickets	261	15	1,023	262
Bowling average	34.79	45.53	26.18	22.69
5 wickets in innings	15	0	71	8
10 wickets in match	2	0	12	0
Best bowling	7/77	3/31	8/59	7/39
Catches/stumpings	18/–	2/–	71/–	33/–
- Source: CricketArchive, 21 February 2014

Danish Parabha Shankar Kaneria (Urdu: دانش پربھا شنکر کنیریا; Urdu pronunciation: [d̪ɑːn̪ɪʃ kəneːɾɪjɑː], born 16 December 1980) is a Pakistani former cricketer who played for the Pakistan national cricket team between 2000 and 2010. A right-arm leg spinner who could bowl a googly, Kaneria played 61 Test matches for Pakistan and took 261 wickets at an average of 34.79. He was the second Hindu, after his cousin Anil Dalpat, and the seventh non-Muslim overall to represent Pakistan in international cricket.

After allegations of involvement in spot fixing, Kaneria was given a lifetime ban by the England and Wales Cricket Board (ECB), preventing him from playing in matches under their jurisdiction. His subsequent appeal against the ban was rejected in July 2013. Subsequently, in 2015, the ECB made an effort to recover £250,000 from him with the help of Pakistani authorities.

Kaneria also represented the team in 18 ODIs taking 15 wickets with an average of over 45. In Test cricket, Kaneria's best bowling performance in an innings was seven wickets for 77 runs whereas his best performance in a match was 12 wickets for 94 runs, both against Bangladesh. He also took 15 five-wicket hauls in Test cricket, and achieved six and seven wickets in an innings on three and four occasions respectively. He took ten wickets or more in a match on two occasions, once against Bangladesh and Sri Lanka each. Kaneria never played Twenty20 International matches (T20I) for Pakistan. He played 206 first-class matches, 167 List A (LA) and 65 Twenty20 matches during his career. Kaneria also played in English county cricket during 2004 and 2010 representing Essex County Cricket Club.

In October 2018, Kaneria admitted to having met with a match fixer named Anu Bhatt but Kaneria did not know he was meeting with a fixer. He also mentioned that a lot of his teammates knew the alleged fixer (Anu Bhatt).

== Early life and education ==
Danish was born in Karachi, Sindh, on 16 December 1980 to Prabhashankarbhai Laljibhai Kaneria and Babita Prabhashankarbhai Kaneria. Nicknamed "Danny" and "Nani-Danny", Kaneria is a Hindu and is of Gujarati ethnicity. His ancestors migrated from Surat and settled in Karachi over a century ago. After former test wicket-keeper Anil Dalpat, who is his cousin, Kaneria is the first Hindu to have played for Pakistan.

He was educated at the St. Patrick's High School, Karachi. He then completed his education from the Government Islamia College in Karachi.

== Career ==
=== Domestic career ===
Kaneria represented National Shipping Corporation, Karachi Whites, Pakistan Reserves, Habib Bank Limited cricket team (HBL), Karachi, Essex, Karachi Blues, Karachi Zebras, Karachi Harbour, Sindh cricket team, Baluchistan Bears, Karachi Dolphins and Pakistan A cricket team at domestic level. He started his first-class career when he played a match for National Shipping Corporation against HBL in 1998–99. He conceded 86 runs and took two wickets in the match. Kaneria played 206 first-class matches during 1998–99 and 2011–12, and took 1,024 wickets at the average of 26.16. His economy rate remained 2.98 and a strike rate of over 52. Kaneria took 71 five-wicket hauls during his first-class career. He also took ten or more wickets in a match on 12 occasions. He played his last match of that format against the Punjab cricket team at the Gaddafi Stadium, Lahore while playing for Sindh in February 2012. His best performance for an innings was eight wickets for 59 runs. As a batsman, Kaneria scored 1,918 runs in 264 innings at the average of 10.71 including a half-century. His highest score in first-class cricket remained 65 runs.

Kaneria played his first LA match for Karachi White against Quetta cricket team in April 1998–99 at the United Bank Limited Sports Complex, Karachi. He conceded only 16 runs in 10 overs without taking a wicket. Kaneria played 167 LA matches during his career taking 262 wickets at the average of 22.70. He took eight five-wicket hauls and nine four-wicket hauls in the format. His best performance in LA was seven wickets for 39 runs. Kaneria also scored 379 runs in LA cricket at the average of 9.24 in including his solitary half-century. His highest score in the format was 64 runs. He lastly represented HBL in an LA against Pakistan International Airlines cricket team (PIA) at the Gaddafi Stadium.

Kaneria's first T20 match came in April 2005 against Lahore Eagles while playing for Karachi Zebras. He played 65 T20 matches between 2005 and 2012 and took 87 wickets at the average of 18.78. He took two four-wicket hauls in T20s, and his best bowling performance in the format was four wickets for 22 runs. Kaneria scored 104 runs in T20s, and his final match came against the Peshawar Panthers playing for Karachi Zebras.

=== Tests ===
Kaneria made his international debut as a leg-spinner in November 2000 at the age of 19, playing in a Test match against England at Faisalabad. In that same season, he played two Test matches against the same team taking only four wickets at the average of 54 runs. In the next year, he took six wickets in an innings twice against Bangladesh during the first match of 2001–02 Asian Test Championship. Kaneria took 12 wickets for 94 runs, Pakistan won the match, and his performance earned him the man of the match award. This was also his best bowling performance in a Test match. The following year, during the Pakistan tour Bangladesh, Kaneria achieved his career-best performance in an innings against the same team taking seven wickets for 77 runs at the Bangabandhu National Stadium, Dhaka. In October 2003–04, he was part of the Pakistan team during the South Africa tour of Pakistan. In first Test match played at the Gaddafi Stadium, he took seven wickets for 111 runs including a five-wicket haul in the first innings. His performance in the match helped Pakistan winning the match and earned him the man of the match award. He bowled 28.3 overs continuously from the University End providing "the priceless asset of control" to his team and the South African batsmen were unable to "read him with certainty".

In October 2004, he took ten wickets against Sri Lanka at the National Stadium, Karachi, with a second-innings haul of seven wickets for 118, setting up Pakistan's six-wicket win. He took ten wickets in the mach conceding 190 runs. Kaneria bowled 60 overs in that innings which caused his finger bleeding. His performance won him the man of the match award. In January 2005, Kaneria took eight wickets in a math against Australia conceding 204 runs including seven wickets for 188 runs in the first Australian innings. Despite Pakistan lost the match at the Sydney Cricket Ground, he achieved his third seven-wicket haul in Test cricket, and Australian cricketer Shane Warne praised his performance. During the innings, he reached his hundredth Test wicket. Kaneria was initially nominated for the ICC Test Player of the Year by the International Cricket Council (ICC) in 2005 for his performance during the previous year. Kaneria was once described by the BBC as a "match-winner with his leg-breaks".

In 2006 and 2007, Kaneria played 20 Test matches for Pakistan taking 77 wickets including a five-wicket haul against West Indies at Multan in November 2006 despite conceding 26 runs in an over to Brian Lara. He did not play international cricket in 2008. During the last years of his Test career, Kaneria played an important role in Pakistan's Test wins over West Indies, England and India. In December 2009, he took seven wickets 168 in the first innings of the third Test match against New Zealand at the McLean Park, Napier. Pakistan managed to draw that game. This was his fourth seven-wicket haul in an innings.

He played his last Test match against England at the Trent Bridge, Nottingham. Kaneria's Test career lasted almost ten years; he played 61 matches during his career taking 261 wickets at the average of 34.79. He took 15 five-wicket hauls and four four-wicket hauls. Kaneria took seven and six wickets in an innings on four and three occasions respectively. He achieved ten wickets in a Test match two time. He also scored 360 runs at the average of over seven runs whereas his highest in an innings remained 29 runs. Kaneria holds the record for most wickets by any Pakistani spin bowler, and the fourth highest wicket taker of Pakistan in Test cricket, only behind Wasim Akram, Waqar Younis and Imran Khan.

=== One Day Internationals ===
Kaneria made his ODI debut in October 2001 against Zimbabwe at the Sharjah Cricket Association Stadium; he conceded 43 runs in seven overs without taking a wicket. Kaneria played his next match 18 months later against the same team at the same ground. He bowled nine overs and took two wickets for 38 runs in that match. He played eight matches in 2003 taking eight wickets; he appeared in one ODI in 2004. Kaneria played five matches in 2005 taking only three wickets while in 2006 he played a match against Scotland.

Kaneria represented Pakistan in two matches of the 2007 Cricket World Cup, against the West Indies and Zimbabwe. He took one wicket for 45 runs in nine overs against the West Indies, and two wickets for 48 runs in four overs. The later was his last appearance in ODI cricket for Pakistan. He played 18 ODIs for Pakistan and took 15 wickets in the format. In ODI cricket, he has been economical so far with an economy rate under 4.8 runs per over. His best bowling in ODIs came against New Zealand in Sri Lanka in 2003 taking three wickets for 31 runs at the Rangiri Dambulla International Stadium.

Success in the one day arena has been more elusive, Pakistan usually opting to play the two spinning all-rounders Shahid Afridi and Shoaib Malik or Saeed Ajmal instead.

=== County cricket ===
Kaneria played English County Championship between 2004 and 2010 representing Essex. He impressed in county cricket, taking 32 wickets in seven championship matches for Essex in 2005. Although unable to play English [county cricket] in 2006 due to Pakistan's tour of England, he returned to play for Essex in 2007, taking 107 wickets for the County in all forms of the game. He played for Essex again in 2008, although he missed the start of the campaign due to his wife giving birth to their second child. Kaneria suffered a broken finger in Essex's LV County Championship Division Two match against Worcestershire County Cricket Club (Worcestershire CCC) at Colchester on 21 August 2008. The bowler was injured attempting to take a catch off Ben Smith. An X-ray confirmed he had broken a finger and he missed the remainder of the 2008 English domestic season.

=== Match Fixing Inquiry (2010) ===
In May 2010, he was inquired in connection with "match irregularities" in the 2009 domestic season. The investigations are believed to focus on a NatWest Pro40 match in September 2009, which Essex won. In September 2010, police told Kaneria that the investigation had been closed and that he had been cleared of any allegations.

He was selected for the two-match Test series against South Africa. Although he was a part of the training camp, the Pakistan Cricket Board (PCB) stopped him from playing in the series. No reason was given for his exclusion from the series. He then played in the Quaid-e-Azam Trophy for HBL, taking 18 wickets in two games.

On 17 February 2012, during Mervyn Westfield's trial on spot-fixing charges, Kaneria was named in court as the man who approached Westfield with the idea. They were teammates when the alleged approach took place. In June 2012, both were found guilty of offences by an ECB disciplinary panel. As a consequence, Kaneria was banned for life from playing cricket in England and Wales by the aforementioned panel. The PCB had previously agreed to abide by the ECB's decision. Kaneria appealed against the lifetime ban on him by the ECB for his role in spot-fixing. The appeal against English Cricket Board's decision was denied in July 2013 for the second time, with the ECB saying "We note, with regret, that Mr Kaneria has neither made any admission of guilt nor expressed any remorse for his corrupt actions, despite the weight of evidence against him."

In October 2018, after years of denying his guilt, Kaneria admitted to his involvement in the 2009 spot-fixing scandal.

== Personal life ==
Kaneria is a Hindu and an ethnic Gujarati. He is married to Dharmita Kaneria (a daughter of a Varasia family) and has two children.

He is the cousin of former Pakistani wicket-keeper Anil Dalpat.

== See also ==
- List of international cricket five-wicket hauls by Danish Kaneria
