= Arshad Khan (Pakistani cricketer) =

Pakistani cricketer (born 1971)

Personal information
- Born: 22 March 1971 (age 55); Peshawar, Pakistan
- Height: 6 ft 4 in (1.93 m)
- Batting: Right-handed
- Bowling: Right-arm offbreak
- Role: Batsman

International information
- National side: Pakistan
- Test debut (cap 149): 17 November 1997 v West Indies
- Last Test: 24 March 2005 v India
- ODI debut (cap 87): 1 February 1993 v Zimbabwe
- Last ODI: 11 February 2006 v India

Career statistics
Competition	Test	ODI
Matches	9	58
Runs scored	31	133
Batting average	–	12.09
100s/50s	0/0	0/0
Top score	9*	20
Balls bowled	2,538	2,823
Wickets	32	56
Bowling average	30.00	34.78
5 wickets in innings	1	0
10 wickets in match	0	0
Best bowling	5/38	4/33
Catches/stumpings	0/–	10/–
- Source: ESPNcricinfo, 19 February 2006

Arshad Khan (Urdu: ارشد خان, born 22 March 1971) is a Pakistani cricket coach, former cricketer and the current bowling coach of Pakistan women's cricket team. He was a right-handed batsman and a right-arm off break bowler.

A tall man at 6'4", Arshad bowls in a classical off-spinner's mould, preferring a nagging line to any great variation.

In 2015, he moved to Sydney, Australia where he reportedly worked as a taxi driver for some time before going back to cricket as a coach.

== Cricket career ==
Arshad was first picked to play against the West Indies during the 1997–98 season, and the following year, was part of the team which won the Asian Test Championship at Dhaka against Sri Lanka. He captained Pakistan in the 1998 Commonwealth Games Kuala Lumpur. He was a regular inclusion in the Pakistani side until 2001.

Four years later, a strong performance in the Pakistani domestic championship meant that Arshad earned a recall for Pakistan's 2005 tour of India. He performed credibly, particularly in the Bangalore Test, which Pakistan won in the last session to draw the series.

He toured the Caribbean in May 2005, and has retained his place for the upcoming England series.

During the 2005 One Day International series against England, Arshad was used in the second and fifth matches and proved effective at repressing the England batsmen, allowing very few runs to be scored off him and also taking wickets. During the fifth match, his economy was just over 3 runs per over – a very good figure for any bowler, especially a spinner.

== Coaching career ==
On 12 November 2020, he was appointed as bowling coach of Pakistan women's national cricket team.
