= 1998–99 Asian Test Championship =

Cricket tournament

1999 Asian Test Championship
- Tournament logo
- Administrator: Asian Cricket Council
- Cricket format: Test
- Tournament format(s): Round-robin and final
- Champions: Pakistan (1st title)
- Runners-up: Sri Lanka
- Third place: India
- Participants: 3
- Matches: 4
- Player of the series: (Pakistan) Wasim Akram
- Most runs: (Sri Lanka) Mahela Jayawardene (297)
- Most wickets: (Pakistan) Wasim Akram (15)

The first Asian Test Championship, organized by the Asian Cricket Council was held between 16 February and 16 March 1999. India, Pakistan and Sri Lanka competed in the tournament; Bangladesh could not compete because the ICC had not granted them Test status. This tournament was considered to be the predecessor to the Test Cricket World Cup that the ICC was planning for the nine member nations. The tournament was almost canceled in January 1999 due to tour conflicts, television rights and security concerns.

Three round-robin tournament matches were played with each team meeting each other once and the top two sides playing a final. A win was worth 12 points, a tie 6 points and no points were awarded for a draw or loss. In addition to this, bonus points were awarded to teams for bowling and batting performances (see Scoring system). The venues of the round robin matches were rotated between the three countries: India (Calcutta), Sri Lanka (Colombo) and Pakistan (Lahore), while the final was held in Dhaka, Bangladesh as a neutral venue.

Pakistan beat Sri Lanka by an innings and 175 in the final to become the first Asian Test Champions and received US$250,000 in prize money. Sri Lanka, the losing finalists, were awarded US$145,000, and India, the losers of the first round, US$100,000. 'Man of the Series', Wasim Akram, won US$20,000, while 'Man of the Match' winners received US$5,000 in prize money.

== Squads ==
India	Pakistan			Sri Lanka		
1st & 2nd Test	1st Test	2nd Test	Final	1st Test	2nd Test	Final
Mohammad Azharuddin ^{*}; Sachin Tendulkar; Sourav Ganguly; Rahul Dravid; V. V. S. Laxman; Javagal Srinath; + Nayan Mongia; Harbhajan Singh; Sunil Joshi; Sadagoppan Ramesh; Hrishikesh Kanitkar; Laxmi Shukla; Venkatesh Prasad; Anil Kumble; Ashish Nehra	Wasim Akram ^{*}; +Moin Khan; Saeed Anwar; Naved Ashraf; Wajahatullah Wasti; Shahid Afridi; Ijaz Ahmed; Saleem Malik; Yousuf Youhana; Azhar Mahmood; Inzamam-ul-Haq; Waqar Younis; Shoaib Akhtar; Mushtaq Ahmed; Saqlain Mushtaq; Nadeem Khan; Arshad Khan	Wasim Akram ^{*}; +Moin Khan; Saeed Anwar; Fazl-e-Akbar; Wajahatullah Wasti; Shahid Afridi; Mohammad Wasim; Shahid Nazir; Yousuf Youhana; Azhar Mahmood; Inzamam-ul-Haq; Waqar Younis; Shoaib Akhtar; Mushtaq Ahmed; Saqlain Mushtaq; Imran Nazir; Arshad Khan	Wasim Akram ^{*}; +Moin Khan; Saeed Anwar; Imran Nazir; Wajahatullah Wasti; Shahid Afridi; Ijaz Ahmed; Shahid Nazir; Yousuf Youhana; Azhar Mahmood; Inzamam-ul-Haq; Shoaib Akhtar; Saqlain Mushtaq; Arshad Khan	Arjuna Ranatunga ^{*}; Aravinda de Silva; Marvan Atapattu; Hashan Tillakaratne; +Romesh Kaluwitharana; Mahela Jayawardene; Russel Arnold; Avishka Gunawardene; Chaminda Vaas; Ruchira Perera; Eric Upashantha; Chandika Hathurusingha; Ruwan Kalpage; Niroshan Bandaratilleke	Hashan Tillakaratne ^{*}; +Mahela Jayawardene; Marvan Atapattu; Romesh Kaluwitharana; Russel Arnold; Avishka Gunawardene; Pramodya Wickramasinghe; Ruchira Perera; Suresh Perera; Chandika Hathurusingha; Ruwan Kalpage; Niroshan Bandaratilake; Sajeewa de Silva; Upul Chandana	Aravinda de Silva; Russel Arnold; Marvan Atapattu; Avishka Gunawardene; Mahela Jayawardene; Hashan Tillakaratne; +Romesh Kaluwitharana; Upul Chandana; Chaminda Vaas; Pramodya Wickramasinghe; Sajeewa de Silva; Niroshan Bandaratilake; Chandika Hathurusingha; Ruwan Kalpage

=== Umpires ===
The matches were officiated by two independent umpires of the ICC panel. This was the first time that this had occurred, traditionally one ICC umpire and one home umpire stand in Test matches. However, one home umpire was selected as the Third Umpire in each Test match. The ICC Match referee for the entire Championship was Cammie Smith of the West Indies.

Neutral Umpires:

- David Shepherd (England)
- Russell Tiffin (Zimbabwe)
- Doug Cowie (New Zealand)
- Rudi Koertzen (South Africa)
- David Orchard (South Africa)
- Steve Bucknor (West Indies)

Third umpires:

- K. T. Francis (Sri Lanka)
- Srinivasaraghavan Venkataraghavan (India)
- Saleem Badar (Pakistan)

== Scoring system ==
A scoring system was devised by the Asian Test Championship Technical Committee consisting of Duleep Mendis (tournament director), Ashantha De Mel, Sunil Gavaskar and Majid Khan. It was based on the systems used in the Asian countries' domestic leagues.

Points
Result	Points
Win	12
Tie	6
Draw/Loss	0

Bonus points were awarded to teams for good bowling and batting performances (see table below). A maximum of 20 points could be gained in one match (including the 12 match winning points). The bonus bowling and batting points were confined to the first 100 overs of the first innings. The two teams with the highest number of points qualify for the final. If two teams are tied on points, the team with a better run rate in the first 100 overs will go through. If the final ends in a draw, the side with the higher bonus points will win.

Bonus Points^{1}
Runs Scored	Bonus Points	Wickets Taken	Bonus Points
350+	4	9–10	4
300–349	3	7–8	3
225–299	2	5–6	2
150–224	1	3–4	1
^{1}Assessed on the first 100 overs of the 1st innings

== Match results ==
=== 1st Test: India v Pakistan ===
16–20 February 1999
Scorecard

Pakistan	v	India
185 (76.2 overs); Moin Khan 70 (271); Javagal Srinath 5/46 (19 overs)		223 (76.2 overs); Sadagoppan Ramesh 79 (176); Shoaib Akhtar 4/71 (19.2 overs)
316 (99 overs); Saeed Anwar 188 (259); Javagal Srinath 8/86 (27 overs)		232 (91 overs); VVS Laxman 67 (119); Shoaib Akhtar 4/47 (20.1 overs)

Pakistan won by 46 runs
Eden Gardens, Calcutta, India
Umpires: Steve Bucknor (WI) and Dave Orchard (SA)
Player of the match: Saeed Anwar (Pak) and Javagal Srinath (Ind)

- Wajahatullah Wasti (Pak) made his Test debut.

Points Table after 1st Test
Team	Matches	Won	Drawn	Lost	Bonus Batting	Bonus Bowling	Total points
Pakistan	1	1	0	0	1	4	17
India	1	0	0	1	1	4	5
Sri Lanka	0	0	0	0	0	0	0

=== 2nd Test: Sri Lanka v India ===
24–28 February 1999

India	v	Sri Lanka
518/7 (142.5 overs); Sadagoppan Ramesh 143 (214); Russel Arnold 2/94		485 (159.1 overs); Mahela Jayawardene 242 (465); Anil Kumble 4/134
306/5 (104 overs); Sachin Tendulkar 124 (234); Aravinda de Silva 2/59

Match drawn
Sinhalese Sports Club Ground, Colombo, Sri Lanka
Umpires: Rudi Koertzen (SA) and Russell Tiffin (Zim)
Player of the match: Mahela Jayawardene (SL)

- Ashish Nehra (Ind) made his Test debut.

Points Table after 2nd Test
Team	Matches	Won	Drawn	Lost	Bonus Batting	Bonus Bowling	Total points
Pakistan	1	1	0	0	1	4	17
India	2	0	1	1	5	5	10
Sri Lanka	1	0	1	0	2	2	4

=== 3rd Test: Pakistan v Sri Lanka ===
4–8 March 1999

Pakistan	v	Sri Lanka
398 (102.1 overs); Wajahatullah Wasti 133 (238); Pramodya Wickramasinghe 6/103		328 (84.2 overs); Russel Arnold 123 (208); Wasim Akram 4/30
314/8d (96.5 overs); Wajahatullah Wasti 121 (303); Niroshan Bandaratilleke 2/54		165/2 (51.1 overs); Russel Arnold 56 (151); Shahid Nazir 1/27

Match drawn
Gaddafi Stadium, Lahore, Pakistan
Umpires: Rudi Koertzen (SA) and David Shepherd (Eng)
Player of the match: Wajahatullah Wasti (Pak)

Points Table after 3rd Test
Team	Matches	Won	Drawn	Lost	Bonus Batting	Bonus Bowling	Total points
Pakistan	2	1	1	0	5	8	25
Sri Lanka	2	0	2	0	5	6	11
India	2	0	1	1	5	5	10

=== Final: Pakistan v Sri Lanka ===
12–15 March 1999
Scorecard

Sri Lanka	v	Pakistan
231 (78 overs); Aravinda de Silva 72 (164); Arshad Khan 5/38		594 (184.5 overs); Ijaz Ahmed 211 (372); Upul Chandana 6/179
188 (65.3 overs); Hashan Tillakaratne 55 (152); Wasim Akram 3/33

Pakistan won by an innings and 175 runs
National Stadium, Dhaka, Bangladesh
Umpires: David Shepherd (Eng) and Doug Cowie (NZ)
Player of the match: Ijaz Ahmed (Pak)

- Upul Chandana (SL) made his Test debut.
