= Anil Dalpat =

Pakistani cricketer (born 1963)

Personal information
- Full name: Anil Dalpat Sonavaria
- Born: 20 September 1963 (age 63); Karachi, Sindh, Pakistan
- Batting: Right-handed
- Role: Wicket-keeper
- Relatives: Danish Kaneria (cousin)

International information
- National side: Pakistan (1984–1986)
- Test debut (cap 98): 2 March 1984 v England
- Last Test: 9 February 1985 v New Zealand
- ODI debut (cap 47): 26 March 1984 v England
- Last ODI: 27 October 1986 v West Indies

Career statistics
| Competition | Test | ODI | FC | LA |
|---|---|---|---|---|
| Matches | 9 | 15 | 137 | 53 |
| Runs scored | 167 | 87 | 2,556 | 303 |
| Batting average | 15.18 | 12.42 | 17.75 | 12.62 |
| 100s/50s | 0/1 | 0/0 | 0/9 | 0/0 |
| Top score | 52 | 37 | 92* | 40* |
| Catches/stumpings | 22/3 | 13/2 | 307/123 | 48/25 |
- Source: Cricinfo, 4 February 2006

Anil Dalpat Sonavaria (born 20 September 1963) is a Pakistani former cricketer and coach. He was a lower-order batsman and wicketkeeper, and represented Pakistan for a brief interval in the early 1980s, when Wasim Bari was injured. He is the first Hindu to ever play Test cricket for Pakistan.

== Early life and family ==
Anil Dalpat was born in Karachi, Pakistan on 20 September 1963 to Dalpat Sonavaria, who was a club cricketer and head of the Pak Hindus Club. He is a first cousin of Danish Kaneria. He lives in the metropolis of Karachi, and is of Rajasthani heritage originally belonging to Jodhpur. The first Hindu to play Test cricket for Pakistan, Anil Dalpat was one of several wicketkeepers given a chance after the retirement of Wasim Bari.

== Career ==
On his debut, against England at Karachi in 1983–84, Dalpat kept well to the spin of Abdul Qadir as Pakistan won by three wickets. In his nine Tests, he made 25 dismissals and a highest score of 52 against New Zealand at Karachi in 1984–85.

After his retirement, Dalpat became a coach in Canada and later became a businessman.
