= 2001–02 Asian Test Championship =

- Administrator: Asian Cricket Council
- Cricket format: Test
- Tournament format: Round-robin
- Champions: Sri Lanka (1st title)
- Runners-up: Pakistan
- Third place: Bangladesh
- Participants: 3
- Matches: 3
- Most runs: (Sri Lanka) Kumar Sangakkara (298)
- Most wickets: (Sri Lanka) Muttiah Muralitharan (18)

Bangladesh, Pakistan and Sri Lanka competed in the second Asian Test Championship between August 2001 and March 2002. India pulled out of the tournament due to political tensions with Pakistan.

Pakistan and Sri Lanka both played Bangladesh in the two round robin matches. A win was worth 16 or 12 points, a tie 8 points and no points were awarded for a draw or loss. Additionally, bonus points were awarded to teams for bowling and batting performances. Pakistan and Sri Lanka qualified for the final after convincingly beating Bangladesh in Multan and Colombo, respectively.

The final was held at Gaddafi Stadium in Lahore, Pakistan. Sri Lanka beat Pakistan by 8 wickets to win the second Asian Test championship.

== Pre-championship build-up ==
=== India's pullout ===
The 2001–02 Asian Test Championship was originally planned to include all four Asian ICC full-members (Bangladesh, India, Pakistan and Sri Lanka). However, before the tournament started, India's participation was put in doubt.

Initially, the BCCI requested the ACC to change the venue of the final (Dhaka) of the championship. The BCCI requested that if Bangladesh did not reach the final, the match should not be held in Dhaka, and if India and Pakistan were to meet in the final, it should be held in India, and if an India–Sri Lanka final was to take place, it should be held in Sri Lanka. The BCCI stated that if the venue for the final was not changed it would be difficult for India to participate in the championship.

Following this, the BCCI commented that India's participation in the championship and selection of the team would depend on permission from the Indian government. India's delay in confirming their participation in the championship resulted in the ACC threatening that the tournament would go ahead as scheduled without India. However the BCCI reacted strongly to the threat, claiming that "[a] decision will be taken shortly" and that the delay doid not "[construe] that India has pulled out of the championship".

A week before the championship was scheduled to begin, the BCCI announced that India would not participate in the tournament. This decision was reported to have been taken by Indian Prime Minister Atal Bihari Vajpayee and other government ministers after a meeting with the BCCI. It was widely understood that India's withdrawal was due to political tensions between India and Pakistan. Indian sports minister Uma Bharti stated that cricketing ties between the two countries would resume after the normalization of their political ties. Indian players' security and safety in Pakistan was also noted to be a major concern.

As expected, the ACC reacted angrily to India's decision; it confirmed that the tournament would be rescheduled and go ahead with only three teams. Jagmohan Dalmiya, the chairman of the ACF, the marketing arm of the ACC, described the government's decision not to allow the Indian team to participate in the Asian Test Championship as an internal matter:

"It is purely an internal matter between the Government of India and the Indian Cricket Board. The ACC or the ACF has no jurisdiction to deal with the respective governments. I have no comment to make on the decision."

The PCB expressed regret over India's decision not to participate in the championship. The PCB chairman, Lt. Gen. Tauqir Zia, was dismayed over the Indian government's decision to go back on their commitment, which was a guarantee that India would have no objection playing multilateral tournaments which included Pakistan.

The ICC was expected to sanction or fine the BCCI for their actions. The ACC and PCB were expected to experience a financial impact due to India's decision. Pakistan in particular were unhappy since Pakistan's tour of India in 1999 helped raise millions of dollars in revenue for the BCCI. India had already cancelled a tour to Pakistan earlier in the year. Additionally, after the first Test, the Bangladesh Cricket Board reported that they were fearing bankruptcy due to India's withdrawal from the tournament. The director of the BCB, Ashraf-ul-Haq, commented that funds that would have been generated by the ACC from the championship would be used to invest in Bangladesh cricket as well as other minor countries, without which the BCB faced serious financial problems. Ashraf planned on condemning the BCCI in the following ICC executive and ACC meetings.

Former Pakistan Test players, including Intikhab Alam, Haseeb Ahsan, and Wasim Akram, accused India of withdrawing due to fear of losing to Pakistan. Tournament captains, Waqar Younis (Pakistan) and Naimur Rahman (Bangladesh) expressed India's absence as a disappointment.

=== Appointment of John Reid as match referee ===
The Pakistan Cricket Board protested the appointment of John Reid as match referee for the 1st match of the 2001–02 Asian Test Championship. John Reid had been involved in controversies involving the Pakistan team; he had fined and suspended Waqar Younis and Azhar Mahmood for ball tampering and had been involved in reporting Shoaib Akhtar's suspect bowling action to the ICC.

Pakistan used the precedent that Sri Lanka had successfully removed Australian umpire Darrell Hair from their matches during the 1999 Cricket World Cup. Hair had called Sri Lankan off-spinner Muttiah Muralitharan for throwing during a tour of Australia.

However, ICC policies do not permit any member country to veto the appointment of independent referees or umpires. The ICC rejected Pakistan's formal complaint, and the ICC chief executive officer Malcolm Speed assured that the PCB had confirmed that John Reid would receive the same courtesies that are extended to all ICC officials visiting Pakistan.

John Reid did not comment on the protest, but expressed disappointment and that he was still available to go to the match and do the job he had been appointed to.

== Squads ==
Bangladesh

Pakistan

Sri Lanka

1st Test
2nd Test
1st Test
2nd Test
1st Test
2nd Test
- Naimur Rahman (C)
- Javed Omar
- Mehrab Hossain
- Mohammad Ashraful
- Al Sahariar
- Aminul Islam
- Habibul Bashar
- Akram Khan
- Khaled Mashud (wk)
- Enamul Haque Moni
- Hasibul Hossain
- Manjural Islam
- Ranjan Das
- Mohammad Sharif
- Naimur Rahman (C)
- Javed Omar
- Mehrab Hossain
- Mohammad Ashraful
- Al Sahariar
- Aminul Islam
- Habibul Bashar
- Akram Khan
- Khaled Mashud (wk)
- Enamul Haque Moni
- Hasibul Hossain
- Manjural Islam
- Ranjan Das
- Mohammad Sharif
- Waqar Younis (c)
- Saeed Anwar
- Taufeeq Umar
- Inzamam-ul-Haq
- Mohammad Yousuf
- Faisal Iqbal
- Younis Khan
- Abdul Razzaq
- Rashid Latif (wk)
- Danish Kaneria
- Wasim Akram
- Irfan Fazil
- Shoaib Malik
- Mohammad Akram
- Waqar Younis (c)
- Saeed Anwar
- Taufeeq Umar
- Inzamam-ul-Haq
- Mohammad Yousuf
- Faisal Iqbal
- Shahid Afridi
- Abdul Razzaq
- Rashid Latif (wk)
- Saqlain Mushtaq
- Shoaib Malik
- Mohammad Zahid
- Shoaib Akhtar
- Mohammad Sami
- Sanath Jayasuriya (c)
- Marvan Atapattu
- Michael Vandort
- Mahela Jayawardene
- Kumar Sangakkara (wk)
- Hashan Tillakaratne
- Thilan Samaraweera
- Chaminda Vaas
- Muttiah Muralitharan
- Ravindra Pushpakumara
- Ruchira Perera
- Russel Arnold
- Avishka Gunawardene
- Suresh Perera
- Dilhara Fernando
- Sanath Jayasuriya (c)
- Marvan Atapattu
- Michael Vandort
- Mahela Jayawardene
- Kumar Sangakkara (wk)
- Hashan Tillakaratne
- Thilan Samaraweera
- Chaminda Vaas
- Muttiah Muralitharan
- Ravindra Pushpakumara
- Ruchira Perera
- Russel Arnold
- Charitha Buddhika
- Nuwan Zoysa
- Dulip Liyanage
- Upul Chandana
- Tillakaratne Dilshan

Wasim Akram and Mushtaq Ahmed were left out of the initial Pakistan training squad before the tournament. This was done to make room for younger players, however, Akram did feature in the first Test match but failed to record a wicket. Prior to the championship, the Pakistan Cricket Board formally announced that Richard Pybus would be the new coach of the Pakistan team for at least three series.

== Scoring system ==
The scoring system used for the 2001–02 Asian Test Championship was a revised version of the first system used in the 1998–99 Asian Test Championship. The Asian Cricket Council approved the revisions brought forward by the technical committee compromising of Sunil Gavaskar (India), Zaheer Abbas(Pakistan), Ashantha De Mel (Sri Lanka) and Gazi Ashraf (Bangladesh). Points for winning the match were kept at 12, however additional points were given for an innings victory. Points for a tie were increased from 6 to 8.

Points
Result	Points
Win	12
Win by an innings	16
Tie	8
Draw/Loss	0

Bonus points were awarded to teams for good bowling and batting performances (see table below). A maximum of 24 points could be gained in one match (including the 16 match winning points). The bonus bowling and batting points were confined to the first 100 overs of the first innings. The two teams with the highest number of points qualify for the final. If two teams are tied on points, the team with a better run rate in the first 100 overs will go through. If the final ends in a draw, the side with the higher bonus points will win. For the 2001–02 Championship, the bonus point system was changed, 400+ runs and 10 wickets to achieve maximum points (increased for 350+ and 9–10 from the previous championship).

Bonus Points^{1}
Runs Scored	Bonus Points	Wickets Taken	Bonus Points
400+	4	10	4
350–399	3	8–9	3
300–349	2	6–7	2
250–299	1	5	1
^{1}Assessed on the first 100 overs of the 1st innings

== 1st Test: Pakistan v Bangladesh ==
The first Test match of the Championship was between Bangladesh and Pakistan. It was held in Multan, at the newly renovated $2.5 million Multan Cricket Stadium. This was the first Test match to be held in Multan since 1980–81 when the West Indies drew a match with Pakistan. Being the first match in the stadium, the nature of the pitch and ground was unknown, however a result was expected.

This was the first Test match between the two sides. The previous international cricket match between the two sides was at the 1999 Cricket World Cup when Bangladesh upset Pakistan to win its first One Day International against a Test team. Bangladesh was granted Test status only 14 months prior to the championship; this was their fourth Test match, having played India once and Zimbabwe twice losing on all three occasions. Before the match, Bangladesh captain had ruled out the possibility of a repeat upset while batsmen Al Sahariar revealed that the aim for the team was to play the full five days. The Bangladesh team had engaged notable former cricketers Javed Miandad of Pakistan, Andy Roberts of West Indies and Trevor Chappell of Australia as coaches, to strengthen their side. However, monsoon weather had hampered their preparations for the tournament.

For Pakistan, Saqlain Mushtaq was left out of the side due domestic conflicts in England. Taufeeq Umar and Shoaib Malik were included in the initial 16-man squad; both players earned their first Test cap in this match. Wasim Akram, initially left out of the 27-man training squad, was included in the final 16 and 11, taking Shoaib Akhtar's place, after a positive performance in a first-class match between PCB XI and Bangladesh.

Pakistan entered the match as clear favorites, despite having failed to win a Test series at home since 1997, when Wasim Akram captained the side to a 3–0 whitewash over the West Indies. Since then, Pakistan has lost series against Zimbabwe, Sri Lanka, England and Australia.

29 August – 2 September 2001

Bangladesh	v	Pakistan
134 (41.1 overs); Mehrab Hossain 19 (63); Danish Kaneria 6/42		546/3d (114.5 overs); Inzamam-ul-Haq 105 (163); Mohammad Sharif 2/110
148 (41.1 overs); Habibul Bashar 56* (97); Danish Kaneria 6/52

Pakistan won by an innings and 264 runs
Multan Cricket Stadium, Multan, Pakistan
Umpires: Darrell Hair (Aus) and Peter Manuel (SL)
Player of the match: Danish Kaneria (Pak)

=== Day 1 ===
Bangladesh won the toss and elected to bat, however they made a poor start to the match, being bowled out for 134 in 41.1 overs. None of the Bangladeshi batsmen scored 20 runs, while Danish Kaneria took 6 wickets. Pakistan made a confident start to their innings, reaching 219/2 at the end of the day. Saeed Anwar top scored on the day, making 101 from 104 deliveries. He reach 4000 Test runs in this innings, joining the likes of Javed Miandad, Saleem Malik, Inzamam-ul-Haq, Zaheer Abbas and Mudassar Nazar as the only Pakistanis to do so. Pakistan ended the day with an 84 run lead with 8 wickets in hand.

=== Day 2 ===
Pakistan added to their overnight score on the 2nd day, amassing a total of 546/3 (declared), creating a 412 first innings lead. Five players scored centuries: Saeed Anwar (101), Taufeeq Umar(104), Inzamam-ul-Haq (105*), Yousuf Youhana (102*) and Abdul Razzaq (110*). Taufeeq Umar became the 8th Pakistani batsmen to score a century on debut, while Razzaq's was the second fastest century by a Pakistani (after Majid Khan). Inzamam-ul-Haq retired hurt (dehydration) when the score was at 381/3.

The five centuries in one innings equaled a world record set by Australia in 1954–55 against the West Indies in Kingston, Jamaica.

Bangladesh started their innings on the 2nd day with 19 overs remaining. They closed at 55/3 with Habibul Bashar not out on 19.

=== Day 3 ===
Pakistan won the match when Bangladesh were bowled out on the 3rd day; Man of the Match, Kaneria took 6/52 for a career best match total of 12/94. Habibul Bashar was the only batsmen to offer any resistance, scoring an unbeaten 56. The inning and 264 runs victory was the 6th largest in Test cricket history.

=== Reaction ===
Pakistan established four unique records in the match:

1. Five players scored centuries in one innings
2. Saeed Anwar and Taufeeq Umar became the first left-handed opening pair to both score centuries
3. For the second time in Test history two separate century partnerships for the same wicket in the same innings were recorded. Inzamam-ul-Haq and Yousuf Youhana added 123 (unbroken) for the fourth wicket and then Yousuf Youhana and Abdur Razzaq added 165 (unbroken) for the fourth wicket. The latter partnership is considered "fourth" wicket because Inzamam-ul-Haq retired hurt and was not out.
4. The Pakistan v Bangladesh and the concurrent Sri Lanka v India (3rd Test at Colombo) Test matches provided the unique feat of centuries on test debuts on successive days in two separate Test matches.

Additionally, the Test match was the hottest ever, with temperatures in excess of 38 degrees Celsius (100 degree Fahrenheit) on each day.

Wasim Akram was criticised by the media for a poor performance in which he did not take a wicket. However skipper Waqar Younis backed Akram saying that he was unlucky with a couple of dropped chances. Bangladesh coach Trevor Chappell and captain Naimur Rahman were critical of the Tigers batting performance. Chappell also added that Kaneria did not "deserve" 12 wickets. After the match, it was reported that Saeed Anwar's young daughter died. This event led to his eventual move away from cricket.

Pakistan received the maximum 24 points for their victory; 16 for winning by an innings and 4 each for batting and bowling performances. Bangladesh received no points:

Points Table after Match No. 1
Team	Matches	Won	Drawn	Lost	Bonus Batting	Bonus Bowling	Total points
Pakistan	1	1	0	0	4	4	24
Bangladesh	1	0	0	1	0	0	0
Sri Lanka	0	0	0	0	0	0	0

== 2nd Test: Sri Lanka v Bangladesh ==
The second Test of the Championship was held at the Sinhalese Sports Club Ground in Colombo between Bangladesh and Sri Lanka. It was the first Test between the two sides and to mark the occasion, the Board of Control for Cricket in Sri Lanka (BCCSL) allowed free entry at five enclosures at the stadium. The BCCSL also established prize money for the match, with the winning team earning SLR 70,000, the losing team SLR 40,000 and the Man of the Match earning SLR 25,000.

This Test was the second meeting of the two sides in international cricket; Sri Lanka beat Bangladesh in an ODI during the 1997 Asia Cup. Prior to this match, Bangladesh had lost four Test matches in a row, and their coach Trevor Chappell was expecting this Test to be a learning experience for the side rather than an opportunity to win their first match. Following Bangladesh's batting collapse in the first match of the championship against Pakistan at the hands of leg spinner Danish Kaneria, Bangladesh was expected to perform better with the bat, especially against the in-form Muralitharan who took 23 wickets in 3 Tests against India.

Sri Lanka entered the match after a 2–1 series win over India. Sanath Jayasuriya, the Sri Lanka captain warned ahead of the game that his team can not afford to relax and was expecting good performance against the newest Test nation. Historically, Sri Lanka have had a winning record at the Sinhalese Sports Club Ground, with Chaminda Vaas and Muralitharan taking career bests at this venue. The pitch was not expected to deteriorate in the first three days and was assumed to support fast bowlers.

Both teams made changes for the match. Sri Lanka pacer Dilhara Fernando was ruled out due a groin strain and was replaced by Ravindra Pushpakumara. Additionally, under-performing batsman Russel Arnold and fast bowler Dulip Liyanage were replaced by Michael Vandort and Ruchira Perera respectively. For Bangladesh, Akram Khan and Enamul Haque were replaced by Mohammad Ashraful and Al Sahariar. This was the first Test match for Vandort and Ashraful.

6–10 September 2001
Scorecard

Bangladesh	v	Sri Lanka
90 (36.4 overs); Mohammad Ashraful 36 (53); Muttiah Muralitharan 5/13 (9.4 overs)		555/5d (103.3 overs); Marvan Atapattu 201 (259); Naimur Rahman 2/117 (30.3 overs)
328 (101.3 overs); Mohammad Ashraful 114 (212); Muttiah Muralitharan 5/98 (35.3 overs)

Sri Lanka won by an innings and 137 runs
Sinhalese Sports Club Ground, Colombo, Sri Lanka
Umpires: Rudi Koertzen (SA) and Mian Mohammad Aslam (Pak)
Player of the match: Mohammad Ashraful (Ban) and Muttiah Muralitharan (SL)

Points Table after Match No. 2
Team	Matches	Won	Drawn	Lost	Bonus Batting	Bonus Bowling	Total points
Pakistan	1	1	0	0	4	4	24
Sri Lanka	1	1	0	0	4	4	24
Bangladesh	2	0	0	2	0	0	0

== Final: Pakistan v Sri Lanka ==
After both Pakistan and Sri Lanka defeated Bangladesh in their respective round-robin matches, the two teams agreed to play a straight final instead of their meaningless round-robin match.

The PCB and Board of Control for Cricket in Sri Lanka agreed to play the final match at Gaddafi Stadium in Lahore, Pakistan. It marked the return of international cricket to Pakistan after the 2001 US invasion of Afghanistan prompted the cancellation of tours by New Zealand and Sri Lanka, and the rescheduling of the West Indies series to Sharjah.

6–10 March 2002
Scorecard

Pakistan	v	Sri Lanka
234 (67 overs); Younis Khan 46 (66); Muttiah Muralitharan 4/55 (25 overs)		528 (139.5 overs); Kumar Sangakkara 230 (327); Mohammad Sami 4/120 (36.5 overs)
325 (101.5 overs); Inzamam-ul-Haq 99 (228); Muttiah Muralitharan 4/72 (34 overs)		33/2 (6.2 overs); Kumar Sangakkara 14* (21); Mohammad Sami 1/15 (3 overs)

Sri Lanka won by 8 wickets
Gaddafi Stadium, Lahore, Pakistan
Umpires: Daryl Harper (Aus) and Athar Zaidi (Pak)
Player of the match: Kumar Sangakkara (SL)
