= AstroPay =

Third-party mobile and online payment platform

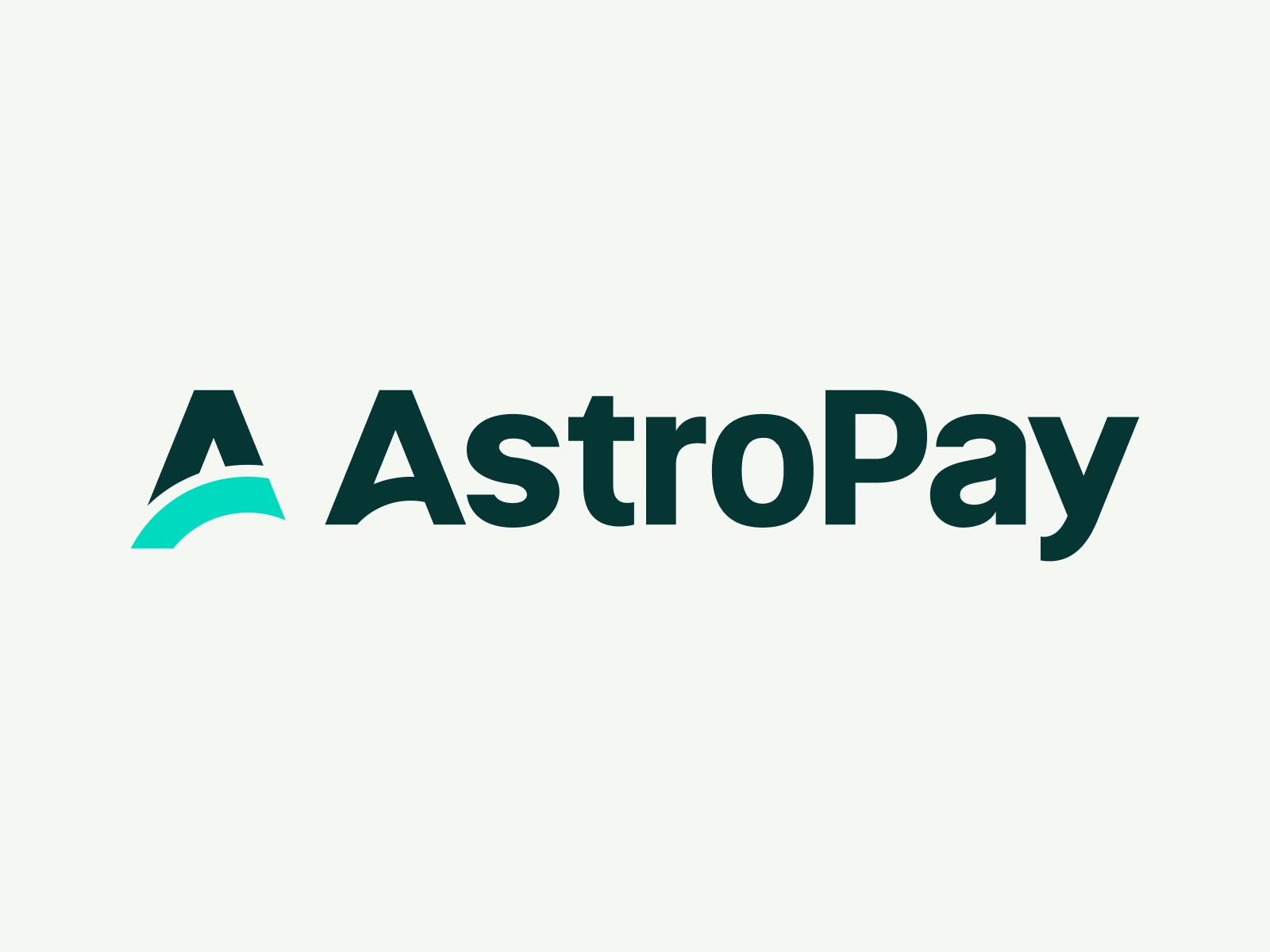
- Industry: Fintech
- Founded: 2009; 17 years ago
- Area served: Worldwide
- Products: Digital wallet
- Number of employees: + 300
- Website: astropay.com

AstroPay is a global digital wallet that provides users with a way to pay, send, and receive money. The app provides online payments, virtual and physical debit cards, peer-to-peer money transfers, and more.

== History ==
AstroPay was founded in Uruguay in 2009 as a payment processing company. Over time, it expanded its services across Latin America, EMEA, and APAC. A significant milestone occurred in 2016, when AstroPay spun off dLocal, focusing on cross-border payments for emerging markets. dLocal became Uruguay's first unicorn and eventually went public through a successful IPO.

In 2020, AstroPay spun off its payment processing services into a new entity, D24, to focus on mobile wallet for cross border. Between 2023 and 2024 the Company brought new leadership to guide its transition towards becoming a fully focused global digital multicurrency wallet where users save, send, and spend globally. This shift introduced enhanced features, including loyalty prepaid cards and multicurrency accounts.

== Services ==
AstroPay offers three main products: AstroPay Wallet, AstroPay check-out, and AstroPay Platform. AstroPay Wallet is a digital wallet for consumers, where they have multicurrency accounts, prepaid card and marketplace. With AstroPay check-out, businesses can tap into AstroPay's wallet user base by accepting AstroPay as a payment method in their check-out options. Lastly, AstroPay Platform enables other businesses to use the AstroPay network to launch their own global wallet.

== Brand endorsements, partnerships ==
AstroPay's marketing strategy has included the development of co-branded products with sports teams and other brand. The company sponsored Burnley Football Club during the 2018–19 Premier League season, renewing the partnership for the 2021–22 Premier League season when it became the club's official payment service partner.

In August 2021, AstroPay entered into a partnership with the Wolverhampton Wanderers for the 2021-22 Premier League season, and the following year, became the team's shirt sponsor. Later, in September 2021, AstroPay expanded its partnership with Wolverhampton Wanderers, which included becoming the team's official payment partner and later, in 2023, co-launching a co-branded card.

Other partnerships include Newcastle United in 2021 in the English Premier League. AstroPay made arrangements to ensure that branding and logo would be visible on the pitch-side LED advertising during Premier League matches.

Furthermore, in June 2022, the company renewed its partnership with Wolverhampton Wanderers for the 2022-23 Premier League season and launched its Wolves debit card in February 2023.

Some other notable partnerships include: Universidad de Chile in 2024, Tottenham Hotspurs in 2023–25, and even a collaboration with Lionel Messi across all of Latin America.

== Recent developments ==
AstroPay has refocused its strategy since 2023, pivoting from payment processing to concentrate on its global digital wallet. This move reflects a broader effort to redefine the company's market positioning by emphasizing global user-friendly financial services, while separating its identity from previous operations managed by dLocal and D24.
