= Ruchira Perera =

Sri Lankan cricketer (born 1977)

Personal information
- Full name: Panagodage Don Ruchira Laksiri Perera
- Born: 6 April 1977 (age 49); Colombo, Sri Lanka
- Height: 5 ft 10 in (178 cm)
- Batting: Left-handed
- Bowling: Left-arm medium-fast

International information
- National side: Sri Lanka (1999–2007)
- Test debut (cap 74): 24 February 1999 v India
- Last Test: 8 November 2002 v South Africa
- ODI debut (cap 98): 29 January 1999 v England
- Last ODI: 20 May 2007 v Pakistan
- T20I debut (cap 9): 15 January 2006 v England
- Last T20I: 26 December 2006 v New Zealand

Career statistics
Competition	Test	ODI	T20I
Matches	8	17	2
Runs scored	33	8	0
Batting average	11.00	2.66	–
100s/50s	0/0	0/0	0/0
Top score	11*	4*	0*
Balls bowled	1,130	798	42
Wickets	17	17	0
Bowling average	38.88	38.88	–
5 wickets in innings	0	0	–
10 wickets in match	0	0	–
Best bowling	3/40	3/23	–
Catches/stumpings	2/–	2/–	0/–
- Source: ESPNcricinfo, 24 March 2017

Panagodage Don Ruchira Laksiri Perera (born 6 April 1977), commonly as Ruchira Perera is a former Sri Lankan cricketer, who played all formats. He is a left-handed batsman and a left-arm medium-fast bowler.

== International career ==
A lively bowler, with a wrist action highly modified with the assistance of bowling coach Daryl Foster in mid-2002, he made a high-profile return against South Africa, but had lost his effectiveness. Having considered a league career in England, he once again regained his form in the English domestic leagues. He was selected for the Sri Lankan tour of New Zealand in 2006 and played one game in the series. He was also selected in the squad to tour Australia. He opened the bowling attack with Chaminda Vaas but suffered a minor injury that made him miss a few games.

He was also a member of first Twenty20 International match of Sri Lanka in 2006, when he received T20I cap no. 9.
