= Asian Test Championship =

Test cricket tournament

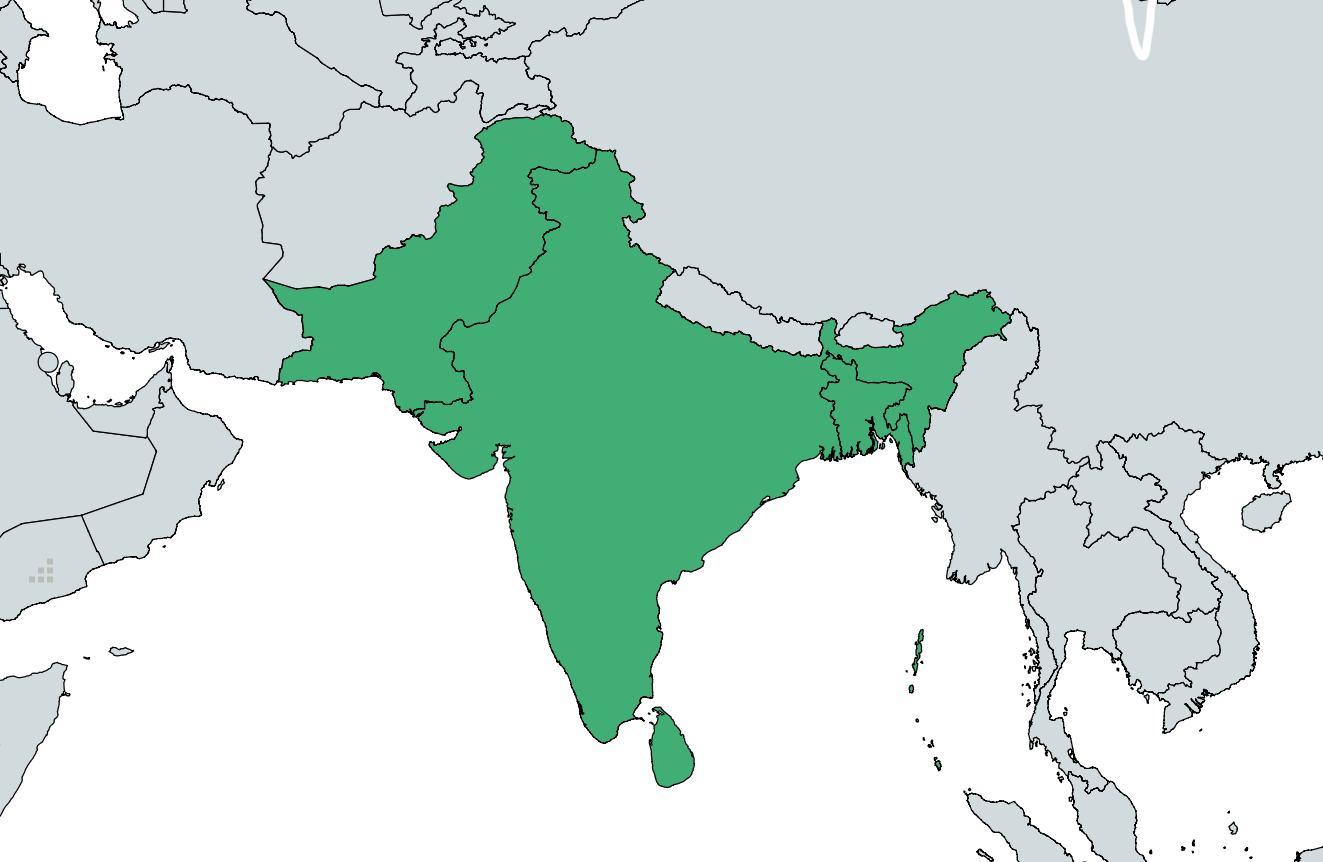
- The countries which took part - Pakistan, Sri Lanka, India and Bangladesh
- Administrator: Asian Cricket Council
- Format: Test cricket
- First edition: 1998–99
- Latest edition: 2001–02
- Tournament format: Round-robin tournament
- Number of teams: 4
- Most successful: Pakistan (1 title); Sri Lanka (1 title)

The Asian Test Championship was a Test cricket tournament contested by the Test-playing nations of Asia: India, Pakistan, Sri Lanka and Bangladesh. It was held only twice, in 1998–99 and in 2001–02. It was originally planned to be held every two years, alternately with the Asia Cup. The third Championship was delayed for four years due to conflicting tours of the participating members. In 2006, the Asian Cricket Council cancelled the Asian Test Championship, as well as the Asian and African Cup, due to the tightly packed International cricket tour schedule.

The tournament winners were Pakistan in 1998–99 and Sri Lanka in 2001–02. Both tournaments contained three teams.

The Asian Test Championship is only the second example of a Test cricket tournament involving more than two teams, the first being the 1912 Triangular Tournament, which was held between Australia, England and South Africa. This tournament was considered to be the predecessor to the ICC World Test Championship that the International Cricket Council (ICC) was planning for the 9 member nations.

== 1998–99 Asian Test Championship ==
Ranking:

1. Pakistan
2. Sri Lanka
3. India

== 2001–02 Asian Test Championship ==
Ranking:

1. Sri Lanka
2. Pakistan
3. Bangladesh

Bangladesh, Pakistan, Sri Lanka competed in the second Asian Test Championship between August 2001 and March 2002. India pulled out of the tournament due to political tensions with Pakistan. Pakistan and Sri Lanka both played Bangladesh in the two round robin matches. A win was worth 16 points, a tie 8 points and no points were awarded for a draw or loss. In addition to this, bonus points were awarded to teams for bowling and batting performances. Pakistan and Sri Lanka qualified for the final after convincingly beating Bangladesh in Multan Cricket Stadium in Pakistan and Colombo in Sri Lanka.

The final was held at Gaddafi Stadium in Lahore, Pakistan. Sri Lanka defeated Pakistan by 8 wickets to win the second Asian Test championship.

== Results ==
Cycle	Number of teams	Final					
Cycle	Number of teams	Venue	Winners	Result	Runners-up	Player of the final	Winning captain
1998–1999	3	National Stadium, Dhaka	Pakistan 594	Pakistan won by an innings and 175 runs	Sri Lanka 231 & 188	(Pakistan) Ijaz Ahmed	(Pakistan) Wasim Akram
2001–2002	3	Gaddafi Stadium, Lahore	Sri Lanka 528 & 33/2	Sri Lanka won by 8 Wickets	Pakistan 234 & 325	(Sri Lanka) Kumar Sangakkara	(Sri Lanka) Sanath Jayasuriya

== Tournament summary ==
Team	Appearances			Best result
Team	Total	First	Latest	Best result
Sri Lanka	2	1998–99	2001–02	Champions (2001–02)
Pakistan	2	1998–99	2001–02	Champions (1998–99)
India	1	1998–99	1998–99	Group stage (1998–99)
Bangladesh	1	2001–02	2001–02	Group stage (2001–02)

== See also ==
- Asia Cup
- ICC World Test Championship
- Women's Asia Cup
