= Sri Lanka national cricket team =

Sri Lanka mens cricket team

Sri Lanka Cricket team
- Association: Sri Lanka Cricket

Personnel
- Captain: Kusal Mendis
- Coach: Gary Kirsten

History
- Test status acquired: 1981; 45 years ago

International Cricket Council
- ICC status: Associate Member (1965); Full Member (1981)
- ICC region: Asia
ICC Rankings	Current	Best-ever
Test	9th	2nd (August 2009)
ODI	8th	2nd (October 1996)
T20I	9th	1st (2012)

Tests
- First Test: v England at P. Sara Oval, Colombo; 17–21 February 1982
- Last Test: v Pakistan at Rawalpindi Cricket Stadium, Rawalpindi; 17–20 November 2026
Tests	Played	Won/Lost
Total	333	107/130 (96 draws)
This year	6	0/3 (3 draws)
- World Test Championship appearances: 3 (first in 2021)
- Best result: 5th place (2023)

One Day Internationals
- First ODI: v West Indies at Old Trafford, Manchester; 7 June 1975
- Last ODI: v Pakistan at Gaddafi Stadium, Lahore; 31 October 2026
ODIs	Played	Won/Lost
Total	953	439/466 (6 ties, 42 no results)
This year	13	5/7 (0 ties, 1 no result)
- World Cup appearances: 13 (first in 1975)
- Best result: Champions (1996)
- World Cup Qualifier appearances: 2 (first in 1979)
- Best result: Champions (1979, 2023)

T20 Internationals
- First T20I: v England at The Rose Bowl, Southampton; 15 June 2006
- Last T20I: v Pakistan at Rawalpindi Cricket Stadium, Rawalpindi; 13 October 2026
T20Is	Played	Won/Lost
Total	243	105/130 (6 ties, 2 no results)
This year	23	7/16 (0 ties, 0 no results)
- T20 World Cup appearances: 8 (first in 2007)
- Best result: Champions (2014)
Test kit
ODI kit
T20I kit
- As of 20 November 2026

The Sri Lanka men's national cricket team, (Sinhala: ශ්‍රී ලංකා පිරිමි ජාතික ක්‍රිකට් කණ්ඩායම, romanized: Shri Lanka Pirimi Jathika Crikat Kandayama; Tamil: இலங்கை தேசிய கிரிக்கெட் அணி) nicknamed The Lions represents Sri Lanka in men's international cricket. It is a full Member of the International Cricket Council (ICC) with Test, One-Day International (ODI) and T20 International (T20I) status. The team first played first class cricket (as Ceylon) in 1926–27 and became an associate member of the ICC in 1965. They made their international debut in the 1975 Cricket World Cup and were later awarded the Test status in 1981, which made Sri Lanka the eighth Test cricket-playing nation. The team is administered by Sri Lanka Cricket.

Sri Lanka's national cricket team achieved success beginning in the 1990s, rising from underdog status to winning the Cricket World Cup in 1996, under the captaincy of Arjuna Ranatunga. Since then, the team has continued fare well international cricket particulalry in limited-overs formats. As well as the World Cup the team won the ICC Champions Trophy in 2002 (co-champions with India), and the ICC T20 World Cup in 2014 (vs India). They have been consecutive runners-up in the 2007 and 2011 Cricket World Cups, and have been runners-up in the ICC T20 World Cup in 2009 and 2012. The Sri Lankan cricket team currently holds several world records, including the world record for the highest team total in Test cricket.

== History ==
=== Early years ===
Cricket was introduced to the island by the British as a result of the colonization and the first recorded match dates back to 1832 as reported in The Colombo Journal. By the 1880s a national team, the Ceylon national cricket team, was formed which began playing first-class cricket by the 1920s. The Ceylon national cricket team achieved Associate Member status of the International Cricket Council in 1965. Renamed Sri Lanka in 1972, the national team first competed in top-level international cricket in 1975, when they were defeated by nine wickets by the West Indies during the 1975 Cricket World Cup at Old Trafford, England.

=== Underdog Era ===
Sri Lanka was awarded Test cricket status in 1981 by the International Cricket Conference. They played their first Test match against England at P. Saravanamuttu Stadium, Colombo, on 17 February 1982. Bandula Warnapura was the captain for Sri Lanka in that match, which England won by 7 wickets. After Sri Lanka was awarded Test status on 21 July 1981 as eighth Test playing nation, they had to wait until 6 September 1985, where Sri Lanka recorded their first Test win by beating India, in the second match of the series by 149 runs at the Paikiasothy Saravanamuttu Stadium, Colombo. They have also won the 2001-02 Asian Test Championship, defeating Pakistan in the final by an innings and 175 runs.

Sri Lanka won their first Test match under the leadership of Duleep Mendis on 11 September 1985 against India, winning by 149 runs at P. Saravanamuttu Stadium. Eventually they won the three-match Test series, 1–0. Sri Lanka had to wait more than seven years for their next series victory, which came against New Zealand in December 1992, when they won the two-match series 1–0. This was immediately followed by a one-wicket victory against England in a one-Test series.

Two years later, on 15 March 1995, Sri Lanka won their first overseas Test match under the leadership of Arjuna Ranatunga against New Zealand, when they beat them by 241 runs at Napier. This win also resulted in their first overseas Test series victory, 1–0. Their next series too was an overseas series, against Pakistan, and that one too resulted in Sri Lankan victory.

Sri Lanka registered their first ODI win against India at Old Trafford, England on 16 June 1979.

=== Modern era ===
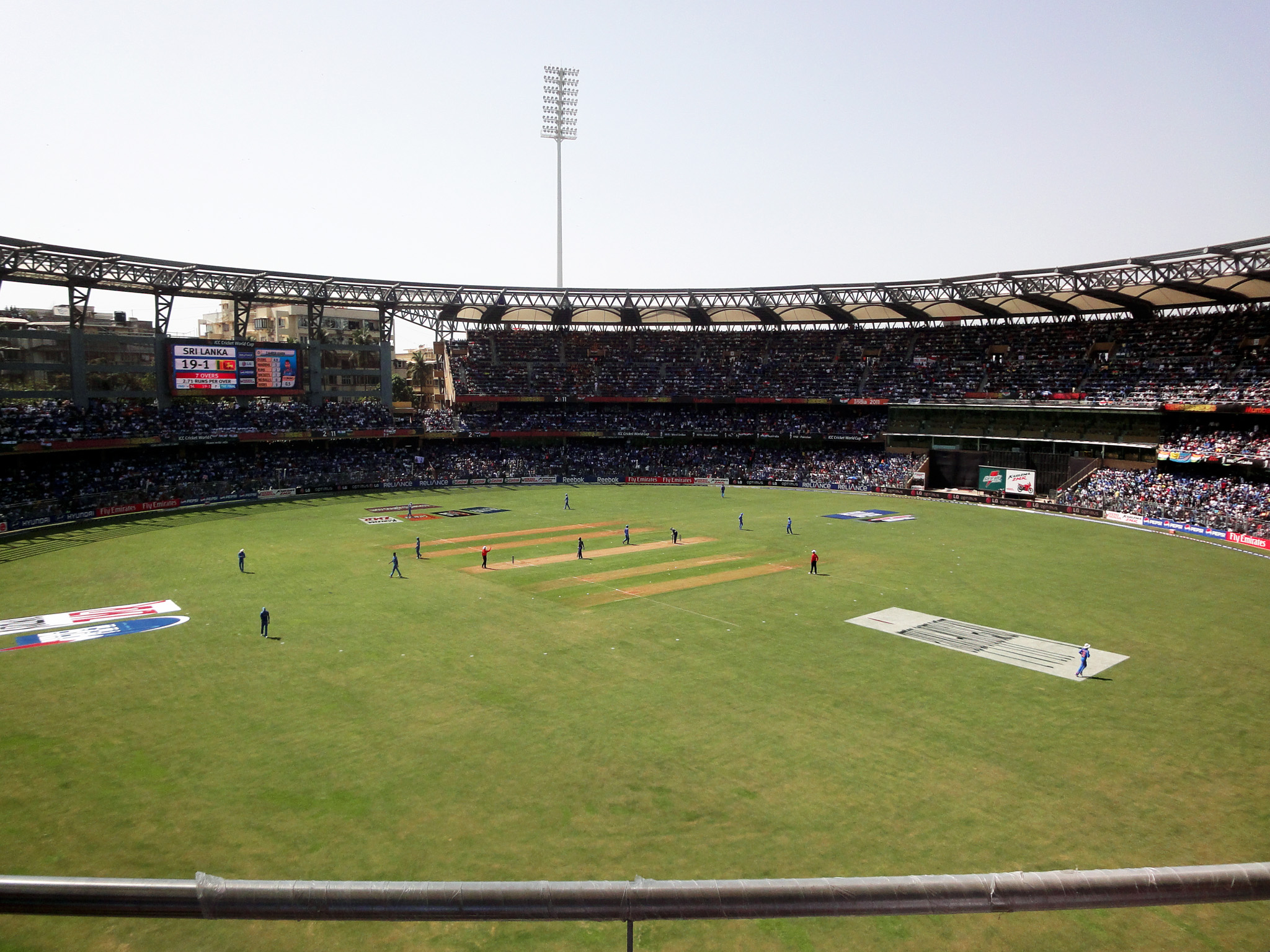
The 2011 Cricket World Cup Final, Sri Lankan team reached their third final in the Cricket World Cups

After many years of underdog status, Sri Lanka finally entered the limelight of the cricketing world after winning the 1996 Cricket World Cup under the captaincy of Arjuna Ranatunga. Meanwhile, they revolutionized modern day batting strategies by rapid scoring during the first 15 overs. Sri Lanka later became the co-champions in 2002 ICC Champions Trophy and also became six times Asian champions in 1986, 1997, 2004, 2008, 2014 and 2022.

On 11 September 1999, under the leadership of Sanath Jayasuriya, Sri Lanka won their first Test match against Australia, when they beat them by six wickets at Asgiriya Stadium, Kandy. Eventually they won the three-match Test series, 1–0.

On 14 June 2000, Sri Lanka played their 100th Test match. It was against Pakistan, at SSC, Colombo, under the leadership of Sanath Jayasuriya. Pakistan won by 5 wickets.

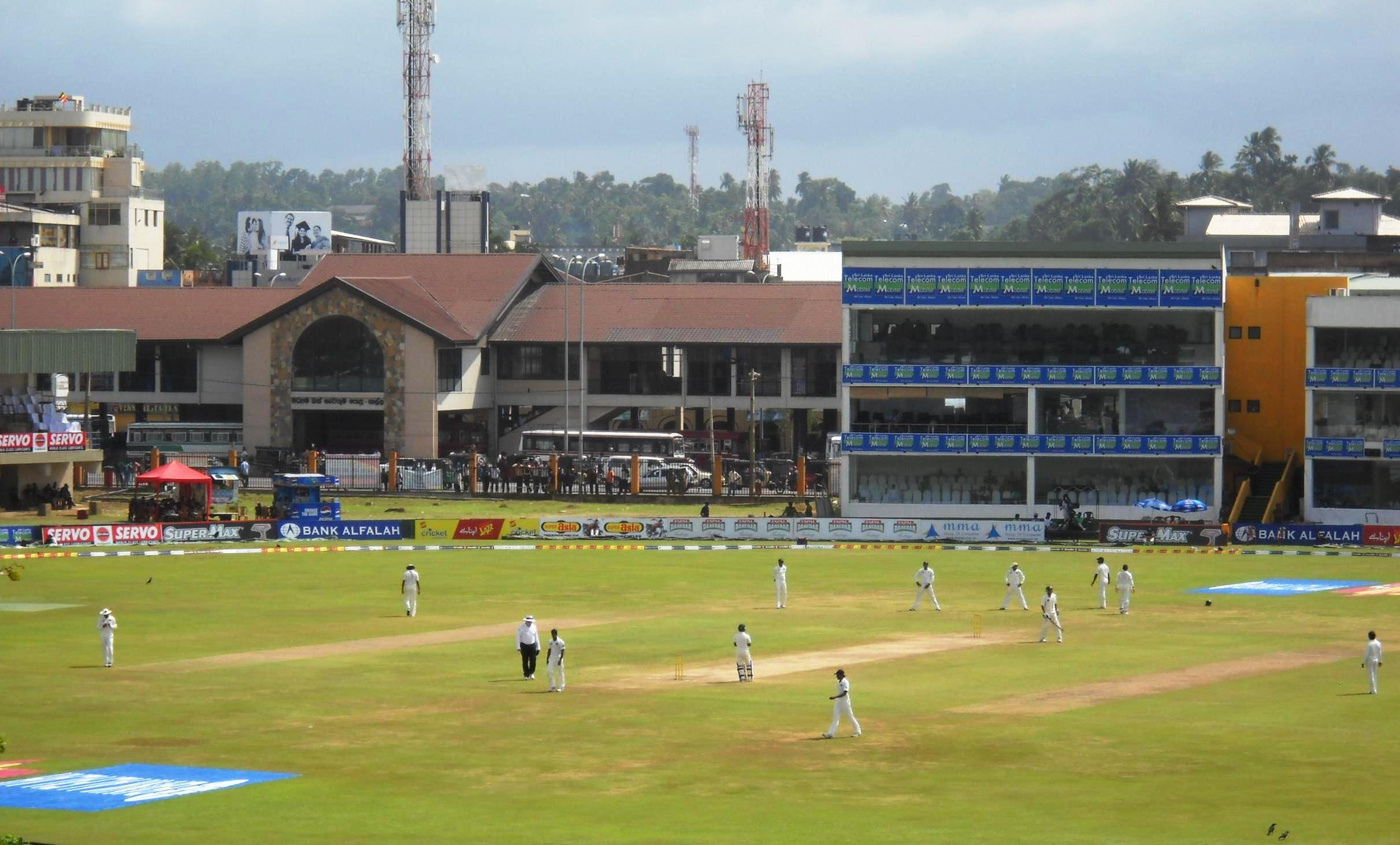
The first Test match of Pakistan's 2012 Sri Lankan tour, Sri Lanka went on to win the match

On 4 August 2016, they played their 250th Test match when they played Australia in Galle. They won the match by 229 runs, and also won the Warne-Muralidharan trophy for the first time since its inception. On 17 August 2016, under the leadership of Angelo Mathews, Sri Lanka whitewashed Australia 3-0 for the first time in Test cricket. Until 2017, Sri Lanka had whitewashed Zimbabwe three times, Bangladesh once and Australia once in Test cricket.

Sri Lanka played their first day-night Test match on 6 October 2017 against Pakistan at Dubai International Cricket Stadium. Under the captaincy of Dinesh Chandimal, Sri Lanka convincingly won the match by 68 runs and sweep the series 2–0. In the match, Dimuth Karunaratne became the first Sri Lankan to score a fifty, a century and a 150 in a day-night Test. Lahiru Gamage, who debut in the match became the first Sri Lankan to take a wicket in a day-night Test, whereas Dilruwan Perera became the first Sri Lankan to take a five-wicket haul in a day-night Test.

Sri Lanka played their first Twenty20 International (T20I) match at the Rose Bowl, on 15 June 2006, against England, winning the match by 2 runs. In 2014, they won the 2014 ICC World Twenty20, defeating India by 6 wickets.

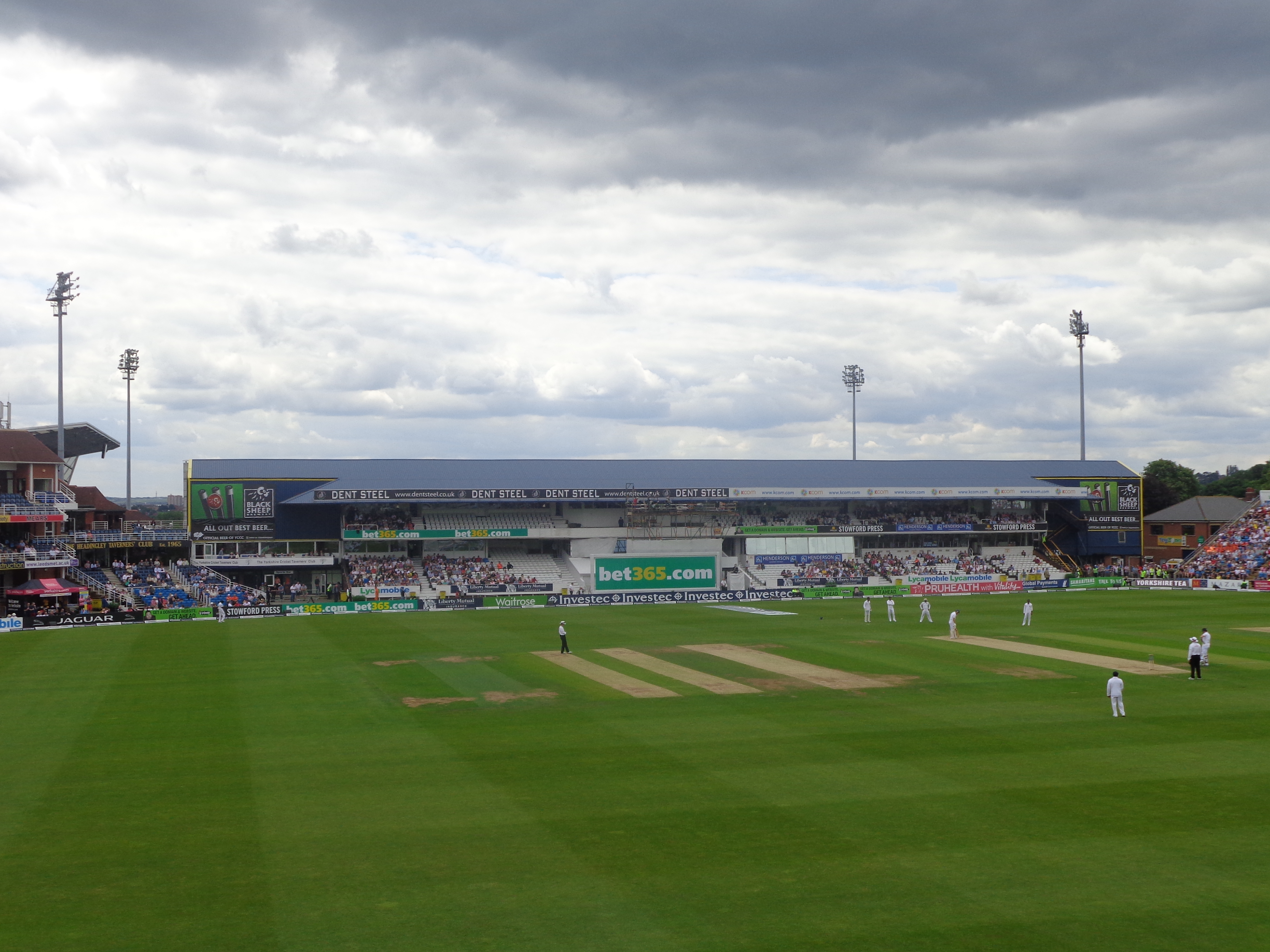
The second Test match of the 2014 Sri Lanka's England tour, Sri Lanka won the match, despite trailing in the first inning

As of July 2018, Sri Lanka have faced nine teams in Test cricket, only recent Test nations Afghanistan and Ireland are missing from their list of opponents, with their most frequent opponent being Pakistan, playing 55 matches against them. Sri Lanka has registered more wins against Pakistan and Bangladesh than any other team, with 14. In ODI matches, Sri Lanka have played against 17 teams; they have played against India most frequently, with a winning percentage of 39.49 in 149 matches. Within usual major ODI nations, Sri Lanka have defeated England on 34 occasions, which is their best record in ODIs. The team have competed against 13 countries in T20Is, and have played 15 matches against New Zealand. Sri Lanka have defeated Australia and West Indies 6 occasions each. Sri Lanka was the best T20I team in the world, where they ranked number one in more than 32 months, and reached World Twenty20 final in three times.

As of 29 January 2024, Sri Lanka have played 313 Test matches; they have won 100 matches, lost 121 matches, and 92 matches were drawn. As of 10 July 2018, Sri Lanka have played 816 ODI matches, winning 376 matches and losing 399; they also tied 5 matches, whilst 36 had no result. As of 10 July 2018, Sri Lanka have played 108 T20I matches and won 54 of them; 52 were lost and 1 tied and 1 no result match as well.

From 8 July 2017 to 23 October 2017, Sri Lanka lost twelve consecutive ODI matches, which is their second-longest losing run in ODIs. In the meantime, Sri Lanka involved 5-0 whitewash in three times against South Africa, India and Pakistan in 2017. And a 3-0 whitewash against the West Indies 3 years later (2020).

On 9 September 2019, Sri Lanka won the T20I series 3–0 against Pakistan in their home under Dasun Shanaka's captaincy. It was the first time that Sri Lanka whitewashed Pakistan in a T20I series. In July 2021, Sri Lanka won T20I series against India 2–1, recording their first ever bilateral T20I series win against India.

On 4 March 2022, Sri Lanka played their 300th Test match in Mohali against India. Sri Lanka lost the match by an innings and 222 runs. Amid political turmoil back home, Sri Lanka won the 2022 Asia Cup, defeating Pakistan in the final on 11 September 2022. On 28 April 2023, Sri Lanka won their 100th Test match against Ireland at Galle. They won the test series 2–0. They became the 8th test nation to reach this milestone.

Sri Lanka cricket was suspended, by the ICC on 10 November 2023 due to the alleged political interference with the cricket administration. The suspension was fully lifted on 28 January 2024.

After 2026 Men's T20 World Cup Defeats, a protest was held outside the headquarters of Sri Lanka Cricket (SLC), with demonstrators demanding the resignation of the cricket board over the national team's continued string of poor performances. The protest, led by a Buddhist monk, saw participants urging SLC President Shammi Silva to step down. Chanting slogans for the board to “go home,” protesters accused officials of failing to revive the standards and reputation of Sri Lanka cricket.

== Governing body ==
Sri Lanka Cricket (formerly the Board for Cricket Control or BCCSL), is the governing body for cricket in Sri Lanka. It operates the Sri Lankan cricket team and first-class cricket within Sri Lanka. Sri Lanka Cricket oversees the progress and handling of the major domestic competitions: the First-class tournament Premier Trophy, the List A tournament Premier Limited Overs Tournament and the Twenty20 Tournament. Sri Lanka Cricket also organises and hosts the Inter-Provincial Cricket Tournament, a competition where five teams take part and represent four different provinces of Sri Lanka.

Most of the regions of Sri Lanka that are rural areas apart from the Capital could not produce successful cricketers to the national and international side yet due to the lack of resources and opportunities while only a few major areas such as Galle, Matara, Kandy, Kurunegala usually produce successful cricketers to the national and international side instead of the capital. So the government is trying to distribute the game within the whole country by organizing some programs such as 2017–18 Super Four Provincial Tournament.

== International grounds ==
Locations of all international grounds in Sri Lanka
Location of international grounds in Colombo

Stadium	City	Capacity	First used	Last used	Tests	ODIs	T20Is
Active stadiums
SSC Cricket Ground	Colombo	10,000	1984	2026	47	65	6
R. Premadasa Stadium	Colombo	35,000	1986	2026	9	158	52
Galle International Stadium	Galle	35,000	1998	2026	50	9	0
Pallekele Cricket Stadium	Pallekele, Kandy	35,000	2010	2026	9	45	32
Rangiri Dambulla Stadium	Dambulla	16,800	2001	2026	0	56	11
Mahinda Rajapaksa Stadium	Sooriyawewa, Hambantota	35,000	2011	2023	0	27	7
Former stadiums
P. Sara Oval	Colombo	15,000	1982	2019	22	12	2
Asgiriya Stadium	Kandy	10,000	1983	2007	21	6	0
CCC Ground	Colombo	6,000	1983	1987	3	0	0
De Soysa Stadium	Moratuwa	16,000	1984	1993	4	6	0

Note: Except abandoned and cancelled matches.

- Updated 18 February 2026.

== Team colours ==
Similar to other Sri Lankan sports teams, the Sri Lankan national cricket team bears blue and yellow as their colours. The bright blue represents the surrounding ocean, while the golden yellow represents the united island as a whole (depicting the sand).

In Test matches, the team wears cricket whites, with an optional sweater or sweater-vest with a dark blue and blue V-neck for use in cold weather, such as on Australia, England, and New Zealand tours. The Sri Lankan flag is found on the left side of the jersey's chest with the Test cap number usually below the flag; helmets are a deep blue and the fielder's hat (usually a baseball cap or a wide-brimmed sunhat) is coloured similarly. The sponsor's logo is displayed on the right side of the chest and the sleeve with the Sri Lankan Cricket logo is deployed on the left in test cricket.

Sri Lanka's One Day and Twenty 20 kits vary from year to year with the team wearing its bright blue colour in various shades from kit to kit with yellow stripes on shoulders and waist. Historically, Sri Lanka's kits have had shades of bright blue and golden yellow. In the World Series Cup in 1984–85, Sri Lanka wore yellow uniforms with blue stripes.

For official ICC tournaments such as ICC Cricket World Cup, ICC World Twenty20 and Asia Cup, "SRI LANKA" is written on the front of the jersey in place of the sponsor logo, with the sponsor logo being placed on the sleeve. A remarkable change in the colour of the kit of Sri Lanka can be found during the 2007 ICC World Twenty20 edition in South Africa. The team-coloured with pale silver and the kit has never been seen since then in the team. Since then, the Sri Lankan kit has never changed from the usual brilliant blue colour and very fine yellow stripes. For 2016 ICC World Twenty20, orange and green colours in the flag are also included in the jersey. In 2017 ICC Champions Trophy pool game against India, the kit changed to the mostly yellow coloured shirt with stripes of blue and usual blue trousers.

At the top-right side of the jersey, instead of the logo, there can be seen Sri Lanka's flag.

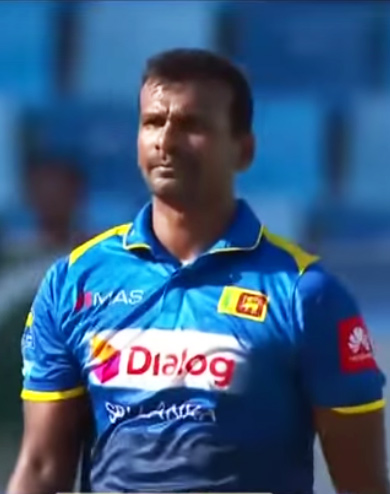
Sri Lanka flag on the jersey

In 2019 for the 2019 Cricket World Cup, the Sri Lankan jersey was made from recycled plastic sea waste from the Sri Lankan coast. On the side of the blue background, there is a drawing of a turtle on the shirt. However, for non-ICC tournaments and bilateral and tri-nation matches, the sponsor logo features prominently on the front of the shirt.

=== Logo ===
Sri Lanka's cricket team's logo is a golden lion with a sword bearing on the right arm and the background is bright blue. The name "Sri Lanka Cricket" is written below the lion. It's seen on the practice jersey at the top-right side.

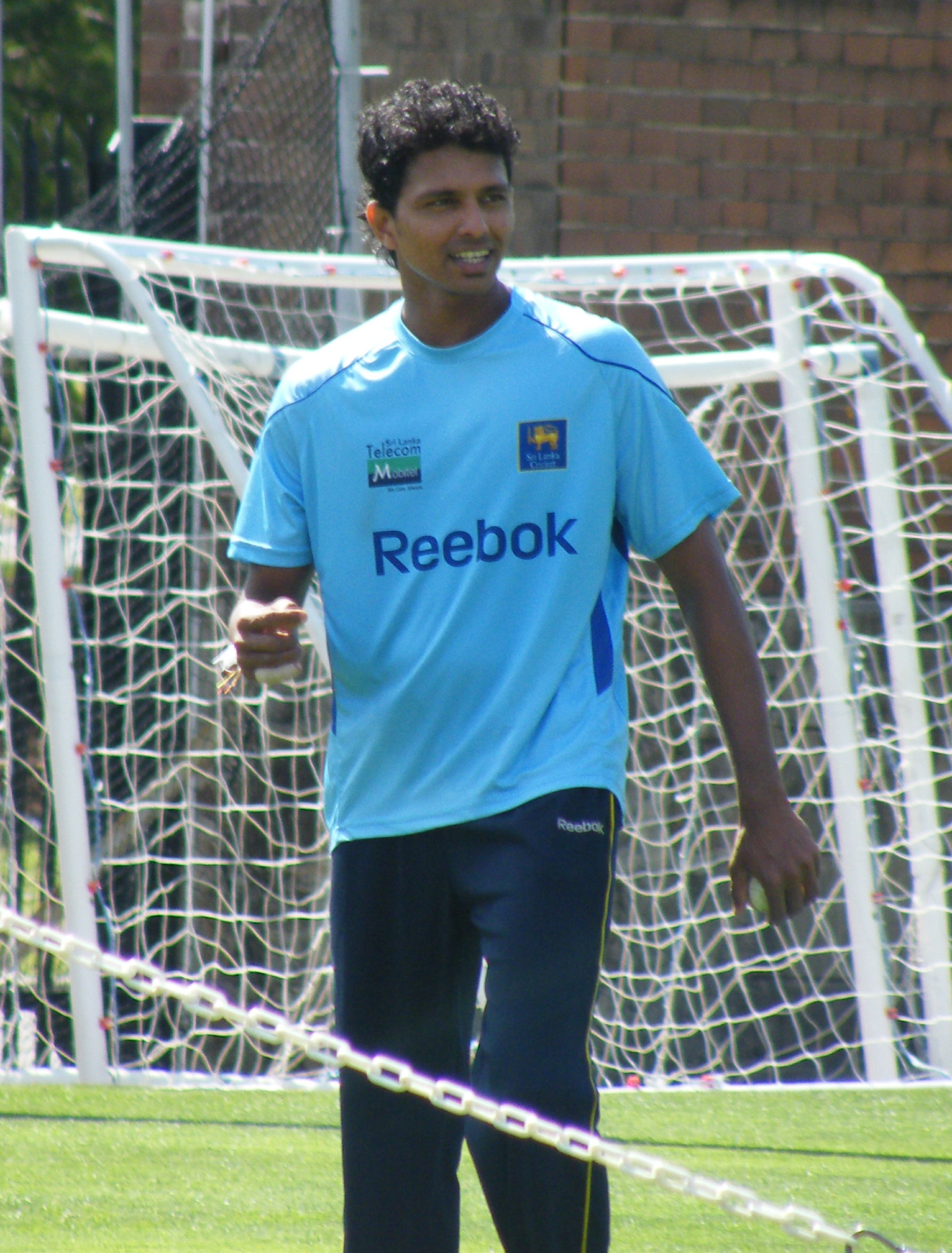
SLC cricket team logo on the practice jersey

In Test cricket, the logo in the cap is slightly changed, where the lion with a sword is surrounded by petals of lotus and then a blue circle surrounds the crest and a yellow circle surrounds the blue circle, present in the coat of arms. This logo is seen on the front of the caps and helmets in ODIs and T20Is.

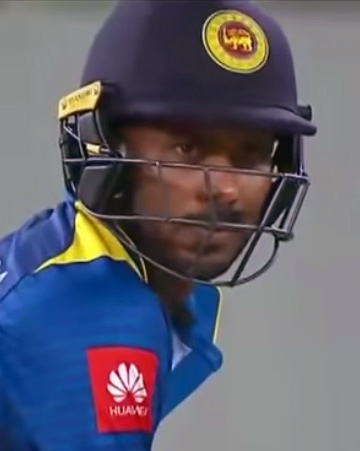
Sri Lanka cricket team logo on the helmet

== Tournament history ==
Key
Champions
Runners-up
Semi-finals
Quarter-finals

Indicates tournaments hosted or co-hosted by Sri Lanka.

=== World Test Championship ===
ICC World Test Championship record
Year	League stage										Final Host	Final	Final Position
Year	Pos	Matches					Ded	PC	Pts	PCT	Final Host	Final	Final Position
Year	Pos	P	W	L	D	T	Ded	PC	Pts	PCT	Final Host	Final	Final Position
2019/21	7/9	12	2	6	4	0	0	720	200	27.8	Rose Bowl, England	DNQ	7th
2021/23	5/9	12	5	6	1	0	0	144	64	44.4	The Oval, England	DNQ	5th
2023/25	6/9	13	5	8	0	0	0	156	60	38.46	Lord's, England	DNQ	6th

=== Cricket World Cup ===
World Cup record
Year	Round	Position	GP	W	L	T	NR
(England) 1975	Group Stage	7/8	3	0	3	0	0
(England) 1979	Group Stage	5/8	3	1	1	0	1
(England) (Wales) 1983	Group Stage	7/8	6	1	5	0	0
(India) (Pakistan) 1987	Group Stage	7/8	6	0	6	0	0
(Australia) (New Zealand) 1992	Group Stage	8/9	8	2	5	0	1
(India) (Pakistan) (Sri Lanka) 1996	Champions	1/12	8	8	0	0	0
(England) (Wales) (Scotland) (Republic of Ireland) (Netherlands) 1999	Group stage	10/12	5	2	3	0	0
(South Africa) (Zimbabwe) (Kenya) 2003	Semi-finals	4/14	10	5	4	0	1
(Cricket West Indies) 2007	Runners-up	2/16	11	8	3	0	0
(India) (Sri Lanka) (Bangladesh) 2011	Runners-up	2/14	9	6	2	0	1
(Australia) (New Zealand) 2015	Quarter-finals	5/14	8	4	3	0	1
(England) (Wales) 2019	Group stage	6/10	9	3	4	0	2
(India) 2023	Group stage	9/10	9	2	7	0	0
(South Africa) (Zimbabwe) (Namibia) 2027	TBD						
(India) (Bangladesh) 2031	TBD						
Total	Champion (1996)	1 title	89	40	46	1	2

=== T20 World Cup ===
World Twenty20 record
Year	Round	Position	GP	W	L	T	NR
(South Africa) 2007	Super 8s	6/12	5	3	2	0	0
(England) 2009	Runners-up	2/12	7	6	1	0	0
(Cricket West Indies) 2010	Semi-finals	3/12	6	3	3	0	0
(Sri Lanka) 2012	Runners-up	2/12	7	5	2	0	0
(Bangladesh) 2014	Champions	1/16	6	5	1	0	0
(India) 2016	Super 10s	8/16	4	1	3	0	0
(United Arab Emirates) (Oman) 2021	Super 12s	8/16	8	5	3	0	0
(Australia) 2022	Super 12s	7/16	8	4	4	0	0
(Cricket West Indies) (United States) 2024	Group stage	12/20	4	1	2	0	1
(India) (Sri Lanka) 2026	Super 8s	7/20	7	3	4	0	0
(Australia) (New Zealand) 2028	TBD						
(England) (Wales) (Scotland) (Republic of Ireland) 2030	TBD						
Total	Champion (2014)	1 title	50	31	19	0	0

=== Champions Trophy ===
Champions Trophy record
Year	Round	Position	GP	W	L	T	NR
(Bangladesh) 1998	Semi-finals	4/9	2	1	1	0	0
(Kenya) 2000	Quarter-finals	6/11	2	1	1	0	0
(Sri Lanka) 2002	Champions	1/12	4	3	0	0	1
(England) 2004	Round 1	8/12	2	1	1	0	0
(India) 2006	Round 1	8/10	6	4	2	0	0
(South Africa) 2009	Round 1	6/8	3	1	2	0	0
(England) (Wales) 2013	Semi-finals	3/8	4	2	2	0	0
(England) (Wales) 2017	Round 1	6/8	3	1	2	0	0
(Pakistan) (United Arab Emirates) 2025	Did not qualify						
(India) 2029	TBD						
Total	7/7	1 title	26	14	11	0	1

=== Asia Cup ===
Asia Cup record
Year	Round	Position	GP	W	L	T	NR
(United Arab Emirates) 1984	Second place	2/3	2	1	1	0	0
(Sri Lanka) 1986	Champions	1/3	3	2	1	0	0
(Bangladesh) 1988	Runners-up	2/4	4	3	1	0	0
(India) 1990–91	Runners-up	2/3	3	2	1	0	0
(United Arab Emirates) 1995	Runners-up	2/4	4	2	2	0	0
(Sri Lanka) 1997	Champions	1/4	4	4	0	0	0
(Bangladesh) 2000	Runners-up	2/4	4	2	2	0	0
(Sri Lanka) 2004	Champions	1/6	6	5	1	0	0
(Pakistan) 2008	Champions	1/6	6	5	1	0	0
(Sri Lanka) 2010	Runners-up	2/4	4	3	1	0	0
(Bangladesh) 2012	Round 1	4/4	3	0	3	0	0
(Bangladesh) 2014	Champions	1/5	5	5	0	0	0
(Bangladesh) 2016	Round 1	4/5	4	1	3	0	0
(United Arab Emirates) 2018	Round 1	6/6	2	0	2	0	0
(United Arab Emirates) 2022	Champions	1/6	6	5	1	0	0
(Pakistan) (Sri Lanka) 2023	Runners up	2/6	6	4	2	0	0
(United Arab Emirates) 2025	Fourth Place	4/8	8	3	2	1	0
Total	17/17	6 titles	74	47	24	1	0

=== Asian Games ===
Asian Games record
Year	Round	Position	GP	W	L	T	NR
(China) 2010	Bronze medal match	4/9	3	1	2	0	0
(South Korea) 2014	Gold medal match	1/9	3	2	0	0	1
(China) 2022	Quarter Finals	5/14	1	0	1	0	0
(Japan) 2026	Bronze medal match	3/8	3	1	1	0	1
Total	3/3	1 title	10	4	4	0	2

=== World Cup Qualifier ===
World Cup Qualifier record
Year	Round	Position	GP	W	L	T	AB
(England) 1979	Champions	1/12	6	4	1	0	1
(Zimbabwe) 2023	Champions	1/10	8	8	0	0	0
Total	2/2	2 title	14	12	1	0	1

=== Other tournaments ===
Commonwealth Games record
Year	Round	Position	GP	W	L	T	NR
(Malaysia) 1998	Fourth place	4/16	5	3	2	0	0
Total	1/1	0 Titles	5	3	2	0	0

=== Defunct tournaments ===
Asian Test Championship record
Year	Round	Position	GP	W	L	D	NR
(India) (Sri Lanka) (Bangladesh) (Pakistan) 1998–99	Runners-up	2/3	3	0	1	2	0
(Sri Lanka) (Bangladesh) (Pakistan) 2001–02	Champions	1/3	2	2	0	0	0
Total	2/2	1 title	5	2	1	2	0

Austral-Asia Cup record
Year	Round	Position	GP	W	L	T	NR
(United Arab Emirates) 1986	Semi Finals	?/5	1	0	1	0	0
(United Arab Emirates) 1989–90	Semi Finals	?/6	3	1	2	0	0
(United Arab Emirates) 1994	First Round	?/6	2	0	2	0	0
Total	3/3	0 titles	6	1	5	0	0

== Honours ==
=== ICC ===
- World Cup
  - Champions (1): 1996
  - Runners-up (2): 2007, 2011
- T20 World Cup
  - Champions (1): 2014
  - Runners-up (2): 2009, 2012
- Champions Trophy
  - Champions (1): 2002 (Note: Joint champions with India)

=== ACC ===
- Asia Cup
  - Champions (6): 1986, 1997, 2004, 2008, 2014, 2022
  - Runners-up (7): 1984, 1988, 1990–91, 1995, 2000, 2010, 2023
- Asian Test Championship
  - Champions (1): 2001–02
  - Runners-up (1): 1998–99

=== Others ===
- Asian Games
  - Gold Medal (1): 2014
  - Bronze Medal (1): 2026
- South Asian Games
  - Silver Medal (2): 2010, 2019
- Hong Kong Cricket Sixes
  - Champions :2007, 2024

== Current squad ==
This is a list of active players who are centrally contracted with SLC or have played for Sri Lanka in the past 12 months or have been named in the recent Test, ODI or T20I squad. Uncapped players are listed in italics.

Last updated: 10 November 2026

Keys
Symbol	Meaning
C	Contracted Players
S/N	Shirt number of the player in all formats
Format	Denotes the particular format/s played over the last year, not entire career

Name	Age	Batting style	Bowling style	Domestic team	LPL team	Forms	C	S/N	Last Test	Last ODI	Last T20I	Captain
Batters
Avishka Fernando	28	Right-handed	Right arm medium	SSC	Jaffna	ODI	Y	28	—N/a	(Pakistan) 2026	(Bangladesh) 2025	
Nuwanidu Fernando	27	Right-handed	Right-arm off break	SSC	Jaffna	ODI, T20I	—N/a	27	—N/a	(Zimbabwe) 2025	(Bangladesh) 2026	
Pathum Nissanka	28	Right-handed	—N/a	NCC	—N/a	Test, ODI, T20I	Y	18	(Cricket West Indies) 2026	(England) 2026	(England) 2026	
Pavan Rathnayake	24	Right-handed	Right-arm off break	CCC	Dambulla	ODI, T20I	Y	51	—N/a	(Pakistan) 2026	(Pakistan) 2026	
Pasindu Sooriyabandara	27	Right-handed	—N/a	Moors	—N/a	Test	-	91	(Pakistan) 2026	—N/a	—N/a	
Sineth Jayawardene	21	Left-handed	Right-arm off break	Tamil Union	Jaffna	T20I	-	26	—N/a	—N/a	(Pakistan) 2026	
Wicket-keeper-batters
Dinesh Chandimal	37	Right-handed	—N/a	Colts	Dambulla	Test	Y	56	(Pakistan) 2026	(Afghanistan) 2022	(Bangladesh) 2025	
Kusal Mendis	31	Right-handed	—N/a	SSC	Colombo	Test, ODI, T20I	Y	13	(Pakistan) 2026	(Pakistan) 2026	(Pakistan) 2026	Test, ODI & T20I
Lahiru Udara	32	Right-handed	—N/a	NCC	Kandy	Test, ODI, T20I	—N/a	32	(Pakistan) 2026	—N/a	(Pakistan) 2026	
Nishan Madushka	27	Right-handed	—N/a	CCC	Jaffna	Test	Y	24	(India) 2026	(Zimbabwe) 2025	—N/a	
Anjala Bandara	22	Left-handed	—N/a	CCC	—N/a	Test	-	45	—N/a	—N/a	—N/a	
All-rounders
Sahan Arachchige	30	Left-handed	Right-arm off break	NCC	Galle	ODI, T20I	Y	43	—N/a	(Pakistan) 2026	(Pakistan) 2026	
Charith Asalanka	29	Left-handed	Right-arm off break	SSC	Galle	ODI	Y	72	(India) 2022	(England) 2026	(England) 2026	
Dhananjaya de Silva	35	Right-handed	Right-arm off break	CCC	—N/a	Test	Y	75	(Pakistan) 2026	(England) 2026	(Pakistan) 2026	
Wanindu Hasaranga	29	Right-handed	Right-arm leg break	CCC	Kandy	ODI, T20I	Y	49	(Bangladesh) 2021	(England) 2026	(England) 2026	
Janith Liyanage	31	Right-handed	Right-arm fast-medium	Bloomfield	Colombo	ODI, T20I	Y	95	—N/a	(Pakistan) 2026	(England) 2026	
Kamindu Mendis	28	Left-handed	Ambidextrous finger spin	CCC	Colombo	Test, ODI, T20I	Y	21	(Pakistan) 2026	(Pakistan) 2026	(Pakistan) 2026	Test, ODI & T20I (VC)
Ramesh Mendis	31	Right-handed	Right-arm off break	Moors	Dambulla	Test	Y	25	(Australia) 2025	(Zimbabwe) 2022	(India) 2024	
Dasun Shanaka	35	Right-handed	Right-arm medium	SSC	Galle	ODI, T20I	Y	7	(England) 2021	(Pakistan) 2026	(Pakistan) 2026	
Milan Rathnayake	30	Left-handed	Right-arm medium-fast	Moors	Colombo	Test	Y	37	(Pakistan) 2026	(Bangladesh) 2025	—N/a	
Sonal Dinusha	25	Left-handed	Slow left-arm orthodox	CCC	Colombo	Test	Y	44	(Pakistan) 2026	—N/a	—N/a	
Dunith Wellalage	23	Left-handed	Slow left-arm orthodox	Colts	Jaffna	ODI, T20I	Y	9	(Pakistan) 2022	(England) 2026	(Pakistan) 2026	
Dushan Hemantha	32	Right-handed	Right-arm leg break	Bloomfield	Kandy	T20I	Y	34	—N/a	(India) 2023	(Bangladesh) 2026	
Chamindu Wickramasinghe	24	Left-handed	Right-arm medium-fast	SSC	Jaffna	T20I	—N/a	22	—N/a	(New Zealand) 2024	(Pakistan) 2026	
Tharindu Rathnayake	30	Left-handed	Ambidextrous finger spin	CCC	Galle	T20I	—N/a	94	(Bangladesh) 2025	—N/a	(Bangladesh) 2026	
Spin Bowlers
Prabath Jayasuriya	35	Right-handed	Slow left-arm orthodox	SSC	—N/a	Test	Y	77	(India) 2026	(South Africa) 2018	—N/a	
Maheesh Theekshana	26	Right-handed	Right-arm off break	Army	Dambulla	ODI, T20I	Y	61	(Pakistan) 2022	(Pakistan) 2026	(Pakistan) 2026	
Jeffrey Vandersay	36	Right-handed	Right-arm leg break	Bloomfield	Colombo	ODI	Y	46	(Australia) 2025	(England) 2026	(Bangladesh) 2025	
Keshara Nuwantha	26	Right-handed	Right-arm off break	Badureliya	—N/a	Test	-	67	(India) 2026	—N/a	—N/a	
Vijayakanth Viyaskanth	24	Right-handed	Right-arm leg break	Bloomfield	Galle	T20I	—N/a	59	—N/a	—N/a	(Pakistan) 2026	
Sachindu Colombage	28	Right-handed	Right-arm leg break	Bloomfield	Galle	ODI	—N/a	58	—N/a	(England) 2026	—N/a	
Pace Bowlers
Dushmantha Chameera	34	Right-handed	Right-arm fast	NCC	Dambulla	ODI, T20I	Y	5	(Cricket West Indies) 2021	(England) 2026	(Pakistan) 2026	
Asitha Fernando	29	Right-handed	Right-arm medium-fast	CCC	Kandy	Test, ODI	Y	78	(Pakistan) 2026	(Pakistan) 2026	(Cricket West Indies) 2024	
Binura Fernando	31	Right-handed	Left-arm medium-fast	Ragama	Colombo	T20I	Y	71	—N/a	(England) 2021	(Pakistan) 2026	
Vishwa Fernando	35	Right-handed	Left-arm medium-fast	CCC	—N/a	Test	Y	68	(Bangladesh) 2025	(South Africa) 2019	(India) 2017	
Lahiru Kumara	29	Left-handed	Right-arm fast	NCC	—N/a	Test	Y	8	(Pakistan) 2026	(New Zealand) 2025	(New Zealand) 2023	
Pramod Madushan	32	Right-handed	Right-arm medium-fast	SSC	Galle	ODI	Y	40	—N/a	(Afghanistan) 2024	(Zimbabwe) 2026	
Dilshan Madushanka	26	Right-handed	Left-arm fast-medium	Colts	Jaffna	Test, ODI, T20I	Y	98	(Pakistan) 2026	(Pakistan) 2026	(England) 2026	
Eshan Malinga	25	Left-handed	Right-arm fast-medium	Bloomfield	Galle	Test, ODI, T20I	Y	97	—N/a	(England) 2026	(Pakistan) 2026	
Matheesha Pathirana	23	Right-handed	Right-arm fast	NCC	—N/a	T20I	Y	81	—N/a	(Pakistan) 2023	(England) 2026	
Kasun Rajitha	33	Right-handed	Right-arm medium-fast	SSC	Galle	Test	Y	65	(Cricket West Indies) 2026	(Bangladesh) 2023	(New Zealand) 2023	
Nuwan Thushara	32	Right-handed	Right-arm medium-fast	CCC	Kandy	T20I	Y	53	—N/a	—N/a	(Pakistan) 2026	

== Coaching staff ==
Position	Name
Team Manager	Mahinda Halangoda
Head coach	Gary Kirsten
Batting coach	Hashan Tillakaratne
Spin bowling coach	Jordan Gregory
Fielding coach	Jordan Gregory
Fast bowling coach	Ryan van Niekerk

=== Selection Committee ===
- Kapila Wijegunawardene (Chairman)
- Amal Silva
- Brendon Kuruppu
- Waruna Waragoda
- Vanessa De Silva

=== Coaching history ===
- 1982-1983: Sir Garfield Sobers
- 1995–1996: Dav Whatmore
- 1997–1998: Bruce Yardley
- 1998–1999: Roy Dias
- 1999–2003: Dav Whatmore
- 2003–2005: John Dyson
- 2005–2007: Tom Moody
- 2007–2011: Trevor Bayliss
- 2011: Stuart Law (interim)
- 2011: Rumesh Ratnayake (interim)
- 2011–2012: Geoff Marsh
- 2012–2013: Graham Ford 1st stint
- 2013–2014: Paul Farbrace
- 2014–2015: Marvan Atapattu
- 2015–2016: Jerome Jayaratne (interim)
- 2016–2017: Graham Ford 2nd stint
- 2017: Nic Pothas (interim)
- 2017–2019: Chandika Hathurusingha
- 2019–2021: Mickey Arthur
- 2022: Rumesh Ratnayake (interim)
- 2022–2024: Chris Silverwood
- 2024–2026: Sanath Jayasuriya
- 2026—Present: Gary Kirsten

== Sponsorship ==
Current Sponsors & Partners
Team Sponsor	Dialog
Kit Sponsor	Moose Clothing Company
Partners	ITW Global; Masuri; The IPG Group; Sunquick Sri Lanka
Official Broadcaster	Sony Pictures Networks

The period between 2000 and 2010 saw the sponsorship pass between Ceylon tea, Reebok, Mobitel Sri Lanka and Dialog Axiata; Dilmah has remained a sponsor since the early 2000s, replacing Singer, which was the main sponsor in the 1990s. Former manufacturers were Reebok, AJ Sports, Asics, ISC, and Adidas.

Currently, the main sponsors for Sri Lanka cricket are Dialog Axiata, JAT Holdings and MAS Holdings.

Period	Kit manufacturer	Shirt sponsor		Team sponsor			Official Broadcaster		Internet streaming
1995–2000	(Sri Lanka) MAS	(Sri Lanka) Singer	(Sri Lanka) CTC				Sky Sports	Sri Lanka Rupavahini Corporation	
2000–2003	(Pakistan) AJ Sports	(Sri Lanka) Singer	(Sri Lanka) Dilmah	WSG Nimbus			Taj Television	Sri Lanka Rupavahini Corporation	
2004–2008	(Sri Lanka) MAS	(Sri Lanka) Dilmah	(United States) Pepsi	Caltex	SriLankan Airlines	Emerald	Ten Sports	Sri Lanka Rupavahini Corporation	
2009–2010	(United States) Reebok	(Sri Lanka) Dialog Axiata		National Development Bank	SriLankan Airlines	Emerald	Ten Sports	Carlton Sports Network	
2010–2012	(United States) Reebok	(Sri Lanka) Mobitel			SriLankan Airlines	Emerald	ESPN	Carlton Sports Network	
2013-2014	(Sri Lanka) Emerald	(India) Homestead				Emerald	Ten Sports	Carlton Sports Network	
2014–2016	(Sri Lanka) MAS	(Sri Lanka) Dialog Axiata		Ceylon Tea		Emerald	Ten Sports	Sri Lanka Rupavahini Corporation	
2017–2018	(Sri Lanka) MAS	(China) Huawei		Ceylon Tea	Kent RO Systems	Huawei	Sony Sports Network	Sri Lanka Rupavahini Corporation	YouTube
2019 –2020	(Sri Lanka) MAS	(Sri Lanka) Dialog		Ceylon Tea	Kent RO Systems	Huawei	Sony Sports Network	Sri Lanka Rupavahini Corporation	YouTube
2021–2022	(Sri Lanka) MAS	(United Kingdom) AstroPay					Sony Sports Network	Sri Lanka Rupavahini Corporation	YouTube
2023–2027	(Sri Lanka) Moose	(Sri Lanka) Dialog Axiata	(Sri Lanka) Munchee	Nippon Paint	Brandix	Red Bull	Sony Sports Network	MTV Channel	YouTube

Sponsorship for ICC Tournaments
Tournament	Kit Manufacturer	Sleeve Sponsor
1975 Cricket World Cup		
1979 ICC Trophy
1979 Cricket World Cup
1983 Cricket World Cup
1987 Cricket World Cup
1992 Cricket World Cup	ISC	
1996 Cricket World Cup		Singer
1998 ICC KnockOut Trophy		Singer
1999 Cricket World Cup	Asics	Singer
2000 ICC KnockOut Trophy		Singer
2002 ICC Champions Trophy	AJ Sports	Dilmah
2003 Cricket World Cup	AJ Sports	Dilmah
2004 ICC Champions Trophy	Trendy	Dilmah
2006 ICC Champions Trophy	MAS	Dilmah
2007 Cricket World Cup	MAS	Dilmah
2007 ICC Men's T20 World Cup	MAS	Dilmah
2009 ICC Men's T20 World Cup	Reebok	
2009 ICC Champions Trophy	Reebok	
2010 ICC Men's T20 World Cup	Reebok	
2011 Cricket World Cup	Reebok	
2012 ICC Men's T20 World Cup	MAS	Homestead
2013 ICC Champions Trophy	MAS	Homestead
2014 ICC Men's T20 World Cup	MAS	Homestead
2015 Cricket World Cup	MAS	
2016 ICC Men's T20 World Cup	MAS	Confident Group
2017 ICC Champions Trophy	MAS	Dialog
2019 Cricket World Cup	MAS	Kent RO
2021 ICC Men's T20 World Cup	MAS	AstroPay
2022 ICC Men's T20 World Cup	MAS	Moose
2023 Cricket World Cup Qualifier	Moose	Dialog
2023 Cricket World Cup	Moose	Amul
2024 ICC Men's T20 World Cup	Moose	Amul
2026 Men's T20 World Cup		IFS AB

== Records and statistics ==
=== International match summary ===
Format	Matches	Won	Lost	Tied	Drawn	No result	%Won	Inaugural match	Ref.
Test	331	107	129	0	95	–	32.42	17 February 1982	
ODI	953	439	466	6	–	42	48.51	7 June 1975	
T20I	232	102	122	6	–	2	45.21	15 June 2006	

Updated: 31 October 2026

=== Test matches ===
==== Team records ====
- Highest team total: 952/6 dec. v. India at RPS, Colombo in 1997
- Lowest team total: 42 v. South Africa at Kingsmead in 2024
- Sri Lanka holds the world record for the highest team score, 952/6

==== Individual records ====
- Most matches: 149 Tests – Mahela Jayawardene
- Longest-serving captain: 56 Tests – Arjuna Ranatunga

==== Batting records ====
- Most runs: 12,400 – Kumar Sangakkara
- Best average: 57.40 – Kumar Sangakkara
- Highest individual score: 374 – Mahela Jayawardene v. South Africa at SSC, Colombo in 2006
- Highest partnership: 624 – Kumar Sangakkara and Mahela Jayawardene v. South Africa at SSC, Colombo in 2006
- Most centuries: 38 – Kumar Sangakkara

==== Bowling records ====
- Most wickets: 800 Test wicket– Muttiah Muralitharan
- Best average: 22.67 – Muttiah Muralitharan
- Best figures in an innings: 9/51 – Muttiah Muralitharan v. Zimbabwe at Asgiriya in 2002
- Best figures in a match: 16/220 – Muttiah Muralitharan v. England at The Oval in 1998
- Best strike rate: 51.5 – Lasith Malinga
- Best economy rate: 2.33 – Don Anurasiri

==== Fielding records ====
- Most catches by an outfielder: 205 – Mahela Jayawardene
- Most dismissals as wicketkeeper: 160 – Niroshan Dickwella
- Most dismissals in an innings: 6 – Amal Silva v. India at SSC, Colombo in 1985 and Dinesh Chandimal v. Pakistan at PSS, Colombo in 2015
- Most dismissals in a match: 9 – Amal Silva v. India at SSC, Colombo & PSS, Colombo in 1985 and Prasanna Jayawardene v. Pakistan at Dubai in 2014

==== Record versus other nations ====
Opponent	Matches	Won	Lost	Draw	Tied	% Won	First	Last
Afghanistan	1	1	0	0	0	100.00	2024	2024
Australia	35	5	22	8	0	14.28	1983	2025
Bangladesh	28	21	1	6	0	75.00	2001	2025
England	39	9	18	11	0	23.07	1982	2024
India	48	7	23	17	0	14.58	1982	2026
Ireland	2	2	0	0	0	100.00	2023	2023
New Zealand	40	11	18	11	0	27.50	1983	2024
Pakistan	58	17	22	19	0	28.81	1982	2023
South Africa	33	9	18	6	0	27.27	1993	2024
West Indies	25	11	5	9	0	44.00	1993	2026
Zimbabwe	20	14	0	6	0	70.00	1994	2020
Total	331	107	129	95	0	32.32	1982	2026
Statistics are correct as of 2nd Test Sri Lanka v India at SSC, Colombo; 23–27 August 2026

=== One Day Internationals ===
==== ODI team records ====
- Highest team total: 443/9 (50 overs) v. Netherlands at VRA Cricket Ground in 2006
- Lowest team total: 43 (20.1 overs) v. South Africa at Boland Park in 2012

==== ODI individual records ====
- Most matches: 443 – Mahela Jayawardene
- Longest-serving captain: 193 matches – Arjuna Ranatunga

==== ODI batting records ====
- Most runs: 14,234 – Kumar Sangakkara
- Best average: 44.12 – Pathum Nissanka
- Best strike rate: 112.59 – Thisara Perera
- Highest individual score: 210* – Pathum Nissanka v. Afghanistan at Pallekele International Cricket Stadium in 2024
- Highest partnership: 286* – Sanath Jayasuriya and Upul Tharanga v. England at Headingley in 2006
- Most centuries: 28 – Sanath Jayasuriya
- Most Sixes: 268 – Sanath Jayasuriya

==== ODI bowling records ====
- Most wickets: 534 – Muttiah Muralitharan
- Best average: 21.87 – Ajantha Mendis
- Best figures in an innings: 8/19 – Chaminda Vaas v. Zimbabwe at Colombo (SSC) in 2001
- Best strike rate: 27.3 – Ajantha Mendis
- Best economy rate: 3.93 – Muttiah Muralitharan

==== ODI fielding records ====
- Most catches by an outfielder: 212 – Mahela Jayawardene
- Most dismissals as wicketkeeper: 473 – Kumar Sangakkara
- Most dismissals in a match: 5 – Guy de Alwis v. Australia at Colombo (PSS) in 1983; Hashan Tillakaratne v. Pakistan at Sharjah Cricket Stadium in 1990; Romesh Kaluwitharana v. Pakistan at Sharjah Cricket Stadium in 1995; Kumar Sangakkara v. Netherlands at Colombo (RPS) in 2002

==== ODI record versus other nations ====
Opponent	Matches	Won	Lost	Tied	No Result	% Won	First	Last
Full Members
Afghanistan	15	10	4	0	1	66.66	2014	2024
Australia	105	37	64	0	4	35.23	1975	2025
Bangladesh	60	45	13	0	2	75.00	1986	2025
England	87	40	43	1	3	48.21	1982	2026
India	171	59	99	2	11	34.50	1979	2024
Ireland	5	5	0	0	0	100.00	2007	2023
New Zealand	108	44	54	1	9	40.56	1979	2025
Pakistan	163	60	98	1	4	38.05	1975	2026
South Africa	81	33	46	1	1	40.74	1992	2023
West Indies	69	33	32	0	4	50.76	1975	2026
Zimbabwe	66	51	12	0	3	77.27	1992	2025
Associate Members
Bermuda	1	1	0	0	0	100	2007	2007
Canada	2	2	0	0	0	100	2003	2011
Kenya	6	5	1	0	0	83.33	1996	2011
Netherlands	6	6	0	0	0	100	2002	2023
Oman	1	1	0	0	0	100	2023	2023
Scotland	4	4	0	0	0	100	2011	2023
United Arab Emirates	3	3	0	0	0	100	2004	2023
Total	953	439	466	6	42	48.51	1975	2026
Statistics are correct as of Sri Lanka v Pakistan:at Gaddafi Stadium, Lahore; 31 October 2026

=== Twenty20 Internationals ===
==== T20I team records ====
- Highest team total: 260/6 v. Kenya at Johannesburg in 2007
- Lowest team total: 77 v. South Africa at New York in 2024

==== T20I individual records ====
- Most matches: 114 – Dasun Shanaka†
- Longest-serving captain: 48 matches – Dasun Shanaka

==== T20I batting records ====
- Most runs: 2,593 – Kusal Mendis†
- Best average: 31.77 – Mahela Jayawardene
- Best strike rate: 147.67 – Thisara Perera
- Highest individual score: 107 – Pathum Nissanka v. India at Dubai in 2025
- Highest partnership: 166 – Mahela Jayawardene and Kumar Sangakkara v. West Indies at Kensington Oval in 2010
- Most centuries: 2 – Pathum Nissanka†
- Most Sixes: 97 – Kusal Mendis†

==== T20I bowling records ====
- Most wickets: 151 – Wanindu Hasaranga†
- Best average: 14.42 – Ajantha Mendis
- Best bowling: 6/8 – Ajantha Mendis v. Zimbabwe at Hambantota in 2012
- Best strike rate: 13.4 – Ajantha Mendis
- Best economy rate: 6.45 – Ajantha Mendis

==== T20I fielding records ====
- Most catches by an outfielder: 40 – Dasun Shanaka†
- Most dismissals as wicketkeeper: 45 – Kumar Sangakkara
- Most dismissals in an innings: 4 – Dinesh Chandimal v. South Africa at Johannesburg in 2017

==== T20I record versus other nations ====
Opponent	Matches	Won	Lost	Tied	No Result	% Won	First	Last
Full Members
Afghanistan	9	6	3	0	0	66.66	2016	2025
Australia	27	11	15	1	0	40.74	2007	2026
Bangladesh	22	13	9	0	0	59.09	2007	2025
England	18	4	14	0	0	22.22	2006	2026
India	33	9	21	2	1	28.12	2009	2025
Ireland	4	4	0	0	0	100.00	2009	2026
New Zealand	29	9	17	2	1	39.28	2006	2026
Pakistan	30	12	18	0	0	40.00	2007	2026
South Africa	18	5	12	1	0	27.77	2012	2024
West Indies	21	11	10	0	0	52.38	2009	2026
Zimbabwe	12	8	4	0	0	66.66	2008	2026
Associate Members
Canada	1	1	0	0	0	100.00	2008	2008
Hong Kong	1	1	0	0	0	100.00	2025	2025
Kenya	1	1	0	0	0	100.00	2007	2007
Namibia	2	1	1	0	0	50.00	2021	2022
Netherlands	4	4	0	0	0	100.00	2014	2024
Oman	1	1	0	0	0	100.00	2026	2026
United Arab Emirates	2	2	0	0	0	100.00	2016	2022
Total	235	103	124	6	2	45.06	2006	2026
Statistics are correct as of Sri Lanka v West Indies: at Sabina Park, Kingston, Jamaica; 14 June 2026.

== See also ==
- Cricket in Sri Lanka
- Lanka Premier League
- Bangladesh–Sri Lanka cricket rivalry
- Sri Lanka women's cricket team
- Sri Lanka national under-19 cricket team
- Sri Lanka women's national under-19 cricket team

== Notes ==
Preceded by Pakistan	Test match playing teams 17 February 1982	Succeeded by Zimbabwe
