= List of Sri Lanka Test cricket records =

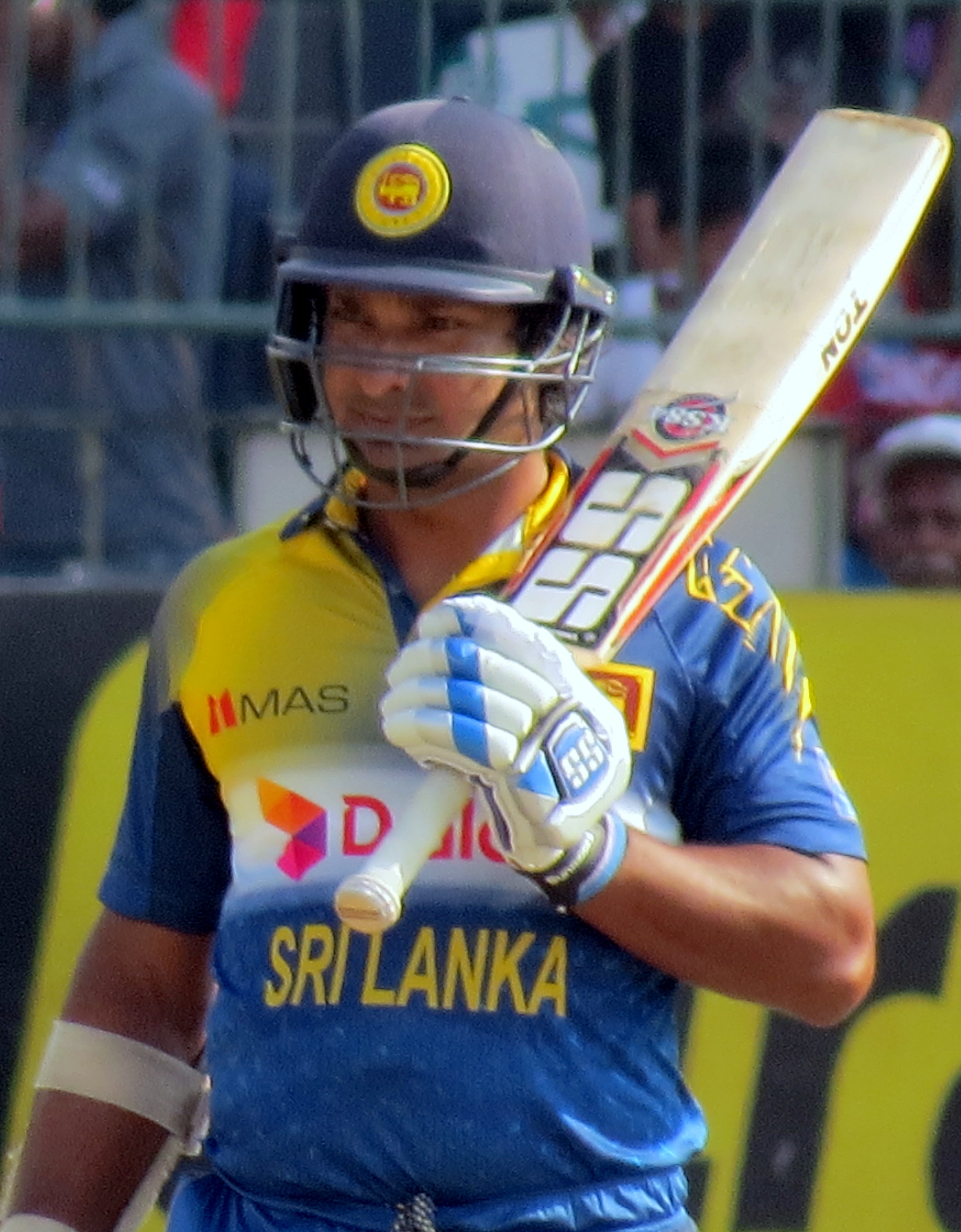
Kumar Sangakkara holds several batting and fielding test cricket records for Sri Lanka.

Test cricket is the oldest form of cricket played at international level. A Test match takes place over a period of five days, and is played by teams representing Full Member nations of the International Cricket Council (ICC). Sri Lanka obtained Full Member status of the ICC in 1981, becoming the eighth nation eligible to play Test cricket. The Sri Lanka national cricket team played their first Test match on 17 February 1982, against England, and recorded their first victory on 6 September 1985, in a match against India. Since then, they have played nearly 300 matches, against every other Test-playing nation. Sri Lanka holds the world record for the highest team score, which was established against India in 1997. The highest partnership in Test cricket was also established by two Sri Lankan batsmen; Mahela Jayawardene and Kumar Sangakkara. Sri Lankan players also hold the highest partnership scores for the second and third wickets.

Top order batter and former captain Kumar Sangakkara holds several Sri Lankan batting records as he has scored the most runs for Sri Lanka in Test cricket. He is also the record holder for the highest number of centuries as well as the highest number of half-centuries. The 374 made by Mahela Jayawardene against South Africa in 2006 is the highest individual score by a Sri Lankan cricketer, surpassing the previous best of 340 by Sanath Jayasuriya, which was established in 1997. It is also the fourth-highest individual score in Test cricket. Jayawardene, Jayasuriya and Kumar Sangakkara [319] are the only Sri Lankan players who have scored triple centuries.

Muttiah Muralitharan, who was hailed by the Wisden Cricketers' Almanack in 2002 as the "best bowler ever" in Test cricket, dominates the bowling records for Sri Lanka. He is the world record holder for the highest number of wickets, the most five wickets per innings, as well as the most ten wickets per match. Muralitharan also holds the records for the best bowling average, best figures in an innings, best figures in a match, and best figures in a series. He missed an opportunity to capture all ten wickets in an innings in 2002 against Zimbabwe, when Chaminda Vaas took the last wicket after Muralitharan had taken the previous nine. The Sri Lankan team won an ODI series against Australia in Australia in 2010. However, they are yet to register a Test match win and an ODI series win against India in India, as of 2017.

Sri Lanka holds a unique record of having the most Test wickets by both a right arm and left arm bowler:: Muralitharan with 800 wickets and Rangana Herath with 433 wickets.

== Key ==
The top five records are listed for each category, except for the team wins, losses, draws and ties and the partnership records. Tied records for fifth place are also included. Explanations of the general symbols and cricketing terms used in the list are given below. Specific details are provided in each category where appropriate. All records include matches played for Sri Lanka only, and are correct as of March 2022.

Key
Symbol	Meaning
†	Player or umpire is currently active in Test cricket
*	Player remained not out or partnership remained unbroken
♠	Test cricket record
d	Innings was declared (e.g. 8/758d)
Date	Starting date of the Test match
Innings	Number of innings played
Matches	Number of matches played
Opposition	The team India was playing against
Period	The time period when the player was active in Test cricket
Player	The player involved in the record
Venue	Test cricket ground where the match was played

== Team records ==
=== Record versus other nations ===
Opponent	Matches	Won	Lost	Draw	Tied	% Won	First	Last
Afghanistan	1	1	0	0	0	100.00	2024	2024
Australia	35	5	22	8	0	14.28	1983	2025
Bangladesh	28	21	1	6	0	75.00	2001	2025
England	39	9	18	11	0	23.07	1982	2024
India	48	7	23	17	0	14.58	1982	2026
Ireland	2	2	0	0	0	100.00	2023	2023
New Zealand	40	11	18	11	0	27.50	1983	2024
Pakistan	58	17	22	19	0	28.81	1982	2023
South Africa	33	9	18	6	0	27.27	1993	2024
West Indies	25	11	5	9	0	44.00	1993	2026
Zimbabwe	20	14	0	6	0	70.00	1994	2020
Total	331	107	129	95	0	32.32	1982	2026
Statistics are correct as of 2nd Test Sri Lanka v India at SSC, Colombo; 23–27 August 2026

=== First Test series wins ===
Opponent	Year of first Home win	Year of first Away win
Afghanistan	2024	YTP
Australia	1999	—
Bangladesh	2002	2006
England	1993	1998
India	1985	—
Ireland	2023	YTP
New Zealand	1992	1995
Pakistan	2009	1995
South Africa	2004	2019
West Indies	2001	—
Zimbabwe	1996	1999
Last updated: 23 September 2024

=== First Test match wins ===
Opponent	Home		Away	
Opponent	Year	Venue	Year	Venue
Afghanistan	2024	Colombo (SSC)	YTP	YTP
Australia	1999	Kandy	—	—
Bangladesh	2002	Colombo (PSS)	2006	Chittagong
England	1993	Colombo (SSC)	1998	The Oval
India	1985	Colombo (PSS)	—	—
Ireland	2023	Galle	YTP	YTP
New Zealand	1992	Colombo (SSC)	1995	Napier
Pakistan	1985	Colombo (CCC)	1995	Faisalabad
South Africa	2000	Galle	2011	Durban
West Indies	2001	Galle	2008	Georgetown
Zimbabwe	1996	Colombo (RPS)	1999	Harare
Last updated: 23 September 2024

=== Team scoring records ===
==== Most runs in an innings ====
Rank	Score	Opposition	Venue	Date
1	952–6d ♠	India	R. Premadasa Stadium, Colombo	2 August 1997
2	760–7d	India	Sardar Patel Stadium, Ahmedabad	16 November 2009
3	756–5d	South Africa	Sinhalese Sports Club Ground, Colombo	27 July 2006
4	730–6d	Bangladesh	Sher-e-Bangla National Cricket Stadium, Dhaka	27 January 2014
5	713–3d	Zimbabwe	Queens Sports Club, Bulawayo	14 May 2004
5	713–9d	Bangladesh	ZAC Stadium, Chittagong	31 January 2018
Last updated: 23 September 2024

==== Highest successful run chases ====
Rank	Score	Target	Opposition	Venue	Date
1	391/6	388	Zimbabwe	R Premadasa Stadium, Colombo, Sri Lanka	14 July 2017
2	352/9	352	South Africa	Paikiasothy Saravanamuttu Stadium, Colombo, Sri Lanka	4 August 2006
3	326/5	326	Zimbabwe	Sinhalese Sports Club Ground, Colombo, Sri Lanka	14 January 1998
4	304/9	304	South Africa	Kingsmead, Durban, South Africa	13 February 2019
5	268/4	268	New Zealand	Galle International Stadium, Galle, Sri Lanka	14 August 2019
Last updated: 23 September 2024

==== Fewest runs in an innings ====
Rank	Score	Opposition	Venue	Date
1	42	South Africa	Kingsmead, Durban	27 November 2024
2	71	Pakistan	Asgiriya Stadium, Kandy	26 August 1994
3	73	Pakistan	Asgiriya Stadium, Kandy	3 April 2006
4	81	England	Sinhalese Sports Club Ground, Colombo	15 March 2001
5	82	India	Sector 16 Stadium, Chandigarh	23 November 1990
5	82	England	Sophia Gardens, Cardiff	26 May 2011
Last updated: 1 December 2024

==== Most runs conceded in an innings ====
Rank	Score	Opposition	Venue	Date
1	765/6d	Pakistan	National Stadium, Karachi, Pakistan	21 February 2009
2	726/9d	India	Brabourne Stadium, Mumbai, India	2 December 2009
3	707	India	Sinhalese Sports Club Ground, Colombo, Sri Lanka	26 July 2010
4	676/7	India	Green Park Stadium, Kanpur, India	17 December 1986
5	671/4	New Zealand	Basin Reserve, Wellington, New Zealand	31 January 1991
Last updated: 23 September 2024

==== Fewest runs conceded in an innings ====
Rank	Score	Opposition	Venue	Date
1	62	Bangladesh	Paikiasothy Saravanamuttu Stadium, Colombo, Sri Lanka	3 July 2007
2	73	South Africa	Galle International Stadium, Galle, Sri Lanka	12 July 2018
3	79	Zimbabwe	Galle International Stadium, Galle, Sri Lanka	12 January 2002
4	81	England	Galle International Stadium, Galle, Sri Lanka	18 December 2007
5	86	Bangladesh	R. Premadasa Stadium, Colombo, Sri Lanka	12 September 2005
Last updated: 23 September 2024

=== Result records ===
A Test match is won when one side has scored more runs than the total runs scored by the opposing side during their two innings. If both sides have completed both their allocated innings and the side that fielded last has the higher aggregate of runs, it is known as a win by runs. This indicates the number of runs that they had scored more than the opposing side. If one side scores more runs in a single innings than the total runs scored by the other side in both their innings, it is known as a win by innings and runs. If the side batting last wins the match, it is known as a win by wickets, indicating the number of wickets that were still to fall.

==== Greatest win margins (by innings) ====
Rank	Margin	Opposition	Venue	Date
1	Innings and 280 runs	Ireland	Galle International Stadium, Galle	18 April 2023
2	Innings and 254 runs	Zimbabwe	Queens Sports Club, Bulawayo	14 May 2004
3	Innings and 248 runs	Bangladesh	Sher-e-Bangla National Cricket Stadium, Dhaka	27 January 2014
4	Innings and 240 runs	Zimbabwe	Harare Sports Club, Harare	6 May 2004
5	Innings and 239 runs	India	Sinhalese Sports Club Ground, Colombo	23 July 2008
Last updated: 23 September 2024

==== Greatest win margins (by runs) ====
Rank	Margin	Opposition	Venue	Date
1	465 runs	Bangladesh	Zohur Ahmed Chowdhury Stadium, Chittagong	3 January 2009
2	328 runs	Bangladesh	Sylhet International Cricket Stadium, Sylhet	22 March 2024
3	315 runs	Zimbabwe	Galle International Stadium, Galle	12 January 2002
4	313 runs	South Africa	Sinhalese Sports Club Ground, Colombo	11 August 2004
5	288 runs	Bangladesh	Sinhalese Sports Club Ground, Colombo	28 July 2002
Last updated: 23 September 2024

==== Greatest win margins (by 10 wickets) ====
Rank	Number of Victories	Opposition	Most Recent Venue	Date
1	2	West Indies	Sinhalese Sports Club Ground, Colombo, Sri Lanka	29 November 2001
1	2	India	Galle International Stadium, Galle, Sri Lanka	18 July 2010
1	2	Zimbabwe	Harare Sports Club, Harare, Zimbabwe	19 January 2020
4	1	England	The Oval, London, England	14 August 1998
4	1	Bangladesh	Shaheed Chandu Stadium, Bogra, Bangladesh	8 March 2006
4	1	New Zealand	Galle International Stadium, Galle, Sri Lanka	17 November 2012
4	1	Afghanistan	Sinhalese Sports Club Ground, Colombo, Sri Lanka	5 February 2024
Last updated: 23 September 2024

==== Narrowest win margins (by runs) ====
Rank	Margin	Opposition	Venue	Date
1	21 runs	Pakistan	Sheikh Zayed Stadium, Abu Dhabi	28 September 2017
2	42 runs	Pakistan	Iqbal Stadium, Faisalabad	15 September 1995
3	50 runs	Pakistan	Galle International Stadium, Galle	4 July 2009
4	57 runs	Pakistan	Arbab Niaz Stadium, Peshawar	5 March 2000
5	63 runs	India	Galle International Stadium, Galle	12 August 2015
Last updated: 23 September 2024

==== Narrowest win margins (by wickets) ====
Rank	Margin	Opposition	Venue	Date
1	1 wicket	South Africa	Sinhalese Sports Club Ground, Colombo	4 August 2006
1	1 wicket	South Africa	Kingsmead Cricket Ground, Durban	13 February 2019
3	2 wickets	Pakistan	Rawalpindi Cricket Stadium, Rawalpindi	26 February 2000
4	5 wickets	England	Sinhalese Sports Club Ground, Colombo	13 March 1993
4	5 wickets	Zimbabwe	Sinhalese Sports Club Ground, Colombo	14 January 1998
Last updated: 23 September 2024

==== Greatest loss margins (by innings) ====
Rank	Margin	Opposition	Venue	Date
1	Innings and 242 runs	Australia	Galle International Stadium, Galle, Sri Lanka	29 January 2025
2	Innings and 239 runs	India	Vidarbha Cricket Association Stadium, Nagpur, India	24 November 2017
3	Innings and 229 runs	South Africa	Newlands, Cape Town, South Africa	2 January 2001
4	Innings and 222 runs	India	Punjab Cricket Association Stadium, Mohali, India	4 March 2022
4	Innings and 222 runs	Pakistan	Sinhalese Sports Club Ground, Colombo, Sri Lanka	24 July 2023
Last updated: 1 February 2025

==== Greatest loss margins (by runs) ====
Rank	Margin	Opposition	Venue	Date
1	423 runs	New Zealand	Hagley Oval, Christchurch, New Zealand	26 December 2018
2	366 runs	Australia	Manuka Oval, Canberra, Australia	1 February 2019
3	304 runs	India	Galle International Stadium, Galle, Sri Lanka	17 July 2017
4	301 runs	Pakistan	Paikiasothy Saravanamuttu Stadium, Colombo, Sri Lanka	9 August 1994
5	282 runs	South Africa	Newlands, Cape Town, South Africa	2 January 2017
Last updated: 23 September 2024

==== Greatest loss margins (by 10 wickets) ====
Rank	Number of Defeats	Opposition	Most Recent Venue	Date
1	2	Pakistan	Galle International Stadium, Galle, Sri Lanka	17 June 2015
1	2	South Africa	Wanderers Stadium, Johannesburg, South Africa	3 January 2021
3	1	Australia	Melbourne Cricket Ground, Melbourne, Australia	26 December 1995
3	1	England	Old Trafford, Manchester, England	13 June 2002
Last updated: 23 September 2024

==== Narrowest loss margins (by runs) ====
Rank	Margin	Opposition	Venue	Date
1	7 runs	South Africa	Asgiriya Stadium, Kandy, Sri Lanka	30 July 2000
2	16 runs	Australia	Sinhalese Sports Club Ground, Colombo, Sri Lanka	17 August 1992
3	27 runs	Australia	Asgiriya Stadium, Kandy, Sri Lanka	16 March 2004
4	42 runs	England	Sinhalese Sports Club Ground, Colombo, Sri Lanka	23 November 2018
5	57 runs	England	Pallekele International Cricket Stadium, Pallekele, Sri Lanka	14 November 2018
Last updated: 23 September 2024

==== Narrowest loss margins (by wickets) ====
Rank	Margin	Opposition	Venue	Date
1	2 wicket	New Zealand	Hagley Oval, Christchurch, New Zealand	9 March 2023
2	3 wicket	Pakistan	Iqbal Stadium, Faisalabad, Pakistan	2 January 1992
2	3 wicket	England	Asgiriya Stadium, Kandy, Sri Lanka	7 March 2001
2	3 wicket	South Africa	Centurion Park, Centurion, South Africa	26 December 1998
5	4 wicket	England	Sinhalese Sports Club Ground, Colombo, Sri Lanka	15 March 2001
5	4 wicket	Bangladesh	Paikiasothy Saravanamuttu Stadium, Colombo, Sri Lanka	17 March 2017
5	4 wicket	Pakistan	Galle International Stadium, Galle, Sri Lanka	20 July 2023
Last updated: 23 September 2024

== Batting records ==
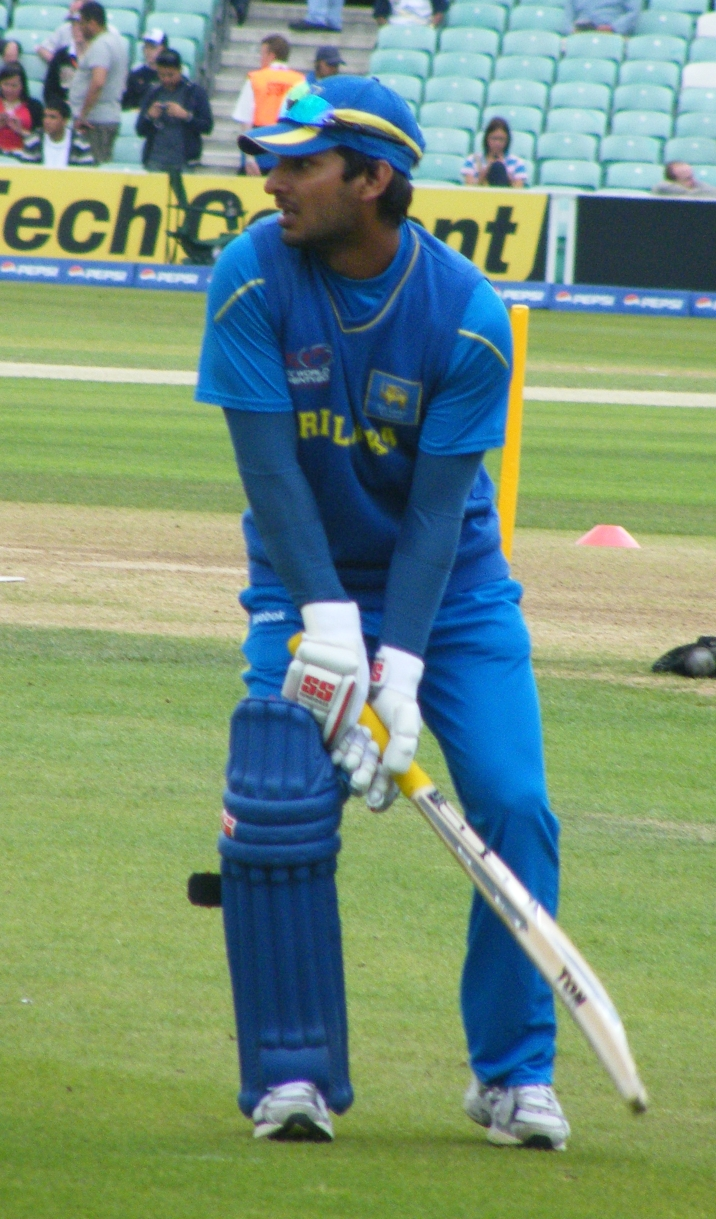
Sangakkara holds several Sri Lanka Test cricket records in batting

=== Most career runs ===
Kumar Sangakkara is the fifth-highest scoring batsman in Test cricket.

Rank	Runs	Player	Matches	Innings	Period
1	12,400	Kumar Sangakkara	134	233	2000–2015
2	11,814	Mahela Jayawardene	149	252	1997–2014
3	8,214	Angelo Mathews	119	212	2009–2025
4	7,222	Dimuth Karunaratne	100	191	2012–2025
5	6,973	Sanath Jayasuriya	110	188	1991–2007
6	6,530	Dinesh Chandimal†	93	165	2011–2026
7	6,361	Aravinda de Silva	93	159	1984–2002
8	5,502	Marvan Atapattu	90	156	1990–2007
9	5,492	Tillakaratne Dilshan	87	145	1999–2013
10	5,462	Thilan Samaraweera	81	132	2001–2013
Last updated: 15 August 2026

=== Fastest runs getter ===
Runs	Batsman	Match	Innings	Record Date	Reference
1000	Kamindu Mendis	8	13	26 September 2024	
2000	Kumar Sangakkara	29	46	20 June 2003	
3000	Mahela Jayawardene	42	65	16 May 2002	
4000	Mahela Jayawardene	57	91	24 March 2004	
5000	Kumar Sangakkara	64	106	15 December 2006	
6000	Kumar Sangakkara	71	116	18 December 2007	
7000	Kumar Sangakkara	83	138	20 July 2009	
8000	Kumar Sangakkara	91 ♠	152 ♠	3 August 2010	
9000	Kumar Sangakkara	103 ♠	172 ♠	3 November 2011	
10000	Kumar Sangakkara	115	195 ♠	26 December 2012	
11000	Kumar Sangakkara	122 ♠	208 ♠	4 February 2014	
12000	Kumar Sangakkara	130 ♠	224 ♠	3 January 2015	
Last updated: 23 September 2024

=== Most runs in each batting position ===
Batting position	Batsman	Innings	Runs	Average	Test Career Span	Ref
Opener	Dimuth Karunaratne	186	7,129	39.82	2012–2025	
Number 3	Kumar Sangakkara	207	11,679	60.83	2000–2015	
Number 4	Mahela Jayawardene	195	9,509	52.25	1997–2014	
Number 5	Thilan Samaraweera	93	3,903	47.60	2001–2013	
Number 6	Hashan Tillakaratne	58	2,843	47.38	1989–2004	
Number 7	Prasanna Jayawardene	62	1,661	30.20	2000–2015	
Number 8	Chaminda Vaas	98	1,913	25.17	1994–2009	
Number 9	Rangana Herath	78	900	13.84	1999-2018	
Number 10	Suranga Lakmal	45	415	12.58	2010–2020	
Number 11	Muttiah Muralitharan	96	621	11.33	1992–2010	
Last updated: 15 August 2026

=== Most runs against each team ===
Opposition	Runs	Player	Matches	Innings	Period	Ref
Afghanistan	141	Angelo Mathews	1	1	2024–2024	
Australia	969	Mahela Jayawardene	16	29	1999–2013	
Bangladesh	1,816	Kumar Sangakkara	15	21	2001–2014	
England	2,212	Mahela Jayawardene	23	41	1998–2014	
India	1,822	Mahela Jayawardene	18	28	1997–2010	
Ireland	385	Kusal Mendis†	2	2	2023-2023	
New Zealand	1,178	Angelo Mathews	15	27	2009–2024	
Pakistan	2,911	Kumar Sangakkara	23	45	2002–2015	
South Africa	1,782	Mahela Jayawardene	17	32	2000–2014	
West Indies	918	Kumar Sangakkara	12	19	2001–2010	
Zimbabwe	1,145	Marvan Atapattu	10	15	1998–2004	
Last updated: 27 September 2024.

=== Highest individual score ===
Rank	Runs	Player	Opposition	Venue	Date
1	374	Mahela Jayawardene	South Africa	Sinhalese Sports Club Ground, Colombo	27 July 2006
2	340	Sanath Jayasuriya	India	R. Premadasa Stadium, Colombo	2 August 1997
3	319	Kumar Sangakkara	Bangladesh	Zahur Ahmed Chowdhury Stadium, Chittagong	4 February 2014
4	287	Kumar Sangakkara	South Africa	Sinhalese Sports Club Ground, Colombo	27 July 2006
5	275	Mahela Jayawardene	India	Sardar Patel Stadium, Ahmedabad	16 November 2009
Last updated: 23 September 2024

=== Highest individual score – progression of record ===
Runs	Player	Opponent	Venue	Season
77	Roy Dias	England	Paikiasothy Saravanamuttu Stadium, Colombo, Sri Lanka	1981–82
157	Sidath Wettimuny	Pakistan	Iqbal Stadium, Faisalabad, Pakistan	1981–82
190	Sidath Wettimuny	England	Lord's, London, England	1984
201*	Brendon Kuruppu	New Zealand	Colombo Cricket Club Ground, Colombo, Sri Lanka	1987
267	Aravinda de Silva	New Zealand	Basin Reserve, Wellington, New Zealand	1991
340	Sanath Jayasuriya	India	R Premadasa Stadium, Colombo, Sri Lanka	1997
374	Mahela Jayawardene	South Africa	Sinhalese Sports Club Ground, Colombo, Sri Lanka	2006
Last updated: 23 September 2024

=== Highest individual score against each team ===
Opposition	Runs	Player	Venue	Date	Ref
Afghanistan	141	Angelo Mathews	Sinhalese Sports Club Ground, Colombo	3 February 2024	
Australia	206*	Dinesh Chandimal	Galle Stadium, Galle	11 July 2022	
Bangladesh	319	Kumar Sangakkara	Zahur Ahmed Chowdhury Stadium, Chittagong	4 February 2014	
England	213*	Mahela Jayawardene	Galle International Stadium, Galle	18 December 2007	
India	340	Sanath Jayasuriya	R. Premadasa Stadium, Colombo	2 August 1997	
Ireland	245	Kusal Mendis	Galle Stadium, Galle	24 April 2023	
New Zealand	267	Aravinda de Silva	Basin Reserve, Wellington	31 January 1991	
Pakistan	253	Sanath Jayasuriya	Iqbal Stadium, Faisalabad	20 October 2004	
South Africa	374	Mahela Jayawardene	Sinhalese Sports Club Ground, Colombo	27 July 2006	
West Indies	204*	Hashan Tillakaratne	Sinhalese Sports Club Ground, Colombo	29 November 2001	
Zimbabwe	270	Kumar Sangakkara	Queens Sports Club, Bulawayo	14 May 2004	
Last updated: 23 September 2024.

=== Highest career average ===
In cricket, batting average is the mean number of runs scored per innings. It is calculated by dividing total runs scored (including innings where he remained not out) by the number of times the batsman has been dismissed.

Rank	Average	Player	Innings	Runs	Not out	Period
1	58.12	Kamindu Mendis†	28	1,453	3	2022–2025
2	57.40	Kumar Sangakkara	233	12,400	17	2000–2015
3	49.84	Mahela Jayawardene	252	11,814	15	1997–2014
4	48.76	Thilan Samaraweera	132	5,462	20	2001–2013
5	44.40	Angelo Mathews	212	8,214	27	2011–2026
Qualification: 20 innings. Last updated: 15 August 2026

=== Highest Average in each batting position ===
Batting position	Batsman	Innings	Runs	Average	Career Span	Ref
Opener	Pathum Nissanka†	21	983	49.15	2021–2025	
Number 3	Kumar Sangakkara	207	11,679	60.83	2000–2015	
Number 4	Mahela Jayawardene	195	9,509	52.25	1997–2014	
Number 5	Dinesh Chandimal†	51	2,213	50.29	2013–2024	
Number 6	Angelo Mathews	38	2,161	48.02	2009–2018	
Number 7	Hashan Tillakaratne	22	701	50.07	1989–2004	
Number 8	Chaminda Vaas	98	1,913	25.17	1994–2009	
Number 9	Chaminda Vaas	42	847	28.23	1994–2009	
Number 10	Suranga Lakmal	45	415	12.5<	2011–2019	
Number 11	Muttiah Muralitharan	98	623	11.33	1992–2010	
Last updated:29 June 2025. Qualification: Min 20 innings batted at position

=== Most Test half-centuries ===
Rank	Half centuries	Player	Innings	Runs	Period
1	52	Kumar Sangakkara	233	12,400	2000–2015
2	50	Mahela Jayawardene	252	11,814	1997–2014
3	45	Angelo Mathews	212	8,214	2009–2025
4	39	Dimuth Karunaratne	191	7,222	2012–2025
5	38	Arjuna Ranatunga	155	5,105	1982–2000
Last updated: 8 February 2025

=== Most Test centuries ===
Rank	Centuries	Player	Innings	Runs	Period
1	38	Kumar Sangakkara	233	12,400	2000–2015
2	34	Mahela Jayawardene	252	11,814	1997–2014
3	20	Aravinda de Silva	159	6,361	1984–2002
4	16	Tillakaratne Dilshan	145	5,492	1999–2013
4	16	Dinesh Chandimal†	161	6,361	2011–2025
4	16	Marvan Atapattu	156	5,502	1990–2007
4	16	Dimuth Karunaratne	191	7,222	2012–2025
4	16	Angelo Mathews	212	8,214	2009–2025
Last updated: 8 February 2025

=== Most Test double centuries ===
Rank	Double centuries	Player	Innings	Runs	Period
1	11	Kumar Sangakkara	233	12,400	2000–2015
2	7	Mahela Jayawardene	252	11,814	1997–2014
3	6	Marvan Atapattu	156	5,502	1990–2007
4	3	Sanath Jayasuriya	188	6,973	1991–2007
5	2	Aravinda de Silva	159	6,361	1984–2002
5	2	Thilan Samaraweera	132	5,462	2001–2013
Last updated: 23 September 2024

=== Most triple centuries ===
Rank	Triple centuries	Player	Innings	Runs	Period
1	1	Sanath Jayasuriya	188	6,973	1991–2007
1	1	Kumar Sangakkara	233	12,400	2000–2015
1	1	Mahela Jayawardene	252	11,814	1997–2014
Last updated: 23 September 2024

=== Most Sixes ===
Rank	Sixes	Player	Innings	Runs	Period
1	90	Angelo Mathews	212	8,214	2009–2025
2	61	Mahela Jayawardene	252	11,814	1997–2014
3	59	Sanath Jayasuriya	188	6,973	1991–2007
4	52	Kusal Mendis†	135	4,757	2015–2025
5	51	Kumar Sangakkara	233	12,400	2000–2015
Last updated: 29 June 2025

=== Most Fours ===
Rank	Fours	Player	Innings	Runs	Period
1	1,491	Kumar Sangakkara	233	12,400	2000–2015
2	1,387	Mahela Jayawardene	252	11,814	1997–2014
3	910	Sanath Jayasuriya	188	6,973	1991–2007
4	835	Angelo Mathews	212	8,214	2009–2025
5	764	Dimuth Karunaratne	191	7,222	2012–2025
Last updated: 21 June 2025

=== Highest batting strike rate ===
Rank	Strike Rate	Player	Runs	Balls	Period
1	72.25	Kusal Perera	1,177	1,629	2015–2021
2	70.28	Muttiah Muralitharan	1,261	1,794	1992–2010
3	66.46	Niroshan Dickwella†	2,757	4,148	2014–2023
4	65.54	Tillakaratne Dilshan	5,492	8,379	1999–2013
5	65.18	Sanath Jayasuriya	6,973	10,698	1991–2007
Qualification: 1,000 balls. Last updated: 29 April 2023

=== Most runs in a series ===
Rank	Runs	Player	Matches	Innings	Series
1	571	Sanath Jayasuriya	2	3	Indian cricket team in Sri Lanka in 1997
2	516	Kumar Sangakkara	3	6	Sri Lankan cricket team against Pakistan in the UAE in 2011–12
3	510	Mahela Jayawardena	2	3	South African cricket team in Sri Lanka in 2006
4	499	Kumar Sangakkara	2	3	Sri Lankan cricket team in Bangladesh in 2013-14
5	493	Aravinda de Silva	3	5	Sri Lankan cricket team in New Zealand in 1990-91
Last updated: 19 July 2023

=== Most ducks in career ===
"Duck" refers to a batsman dismissed without scoring.

Rank	Ducks	Player	Matches	Innings	Period
1	32	Muttiah Muralitharan	132	162	1992–2010
2	23	Rangana Herath	93	144	1999–2018
3	22	Marvan Atapattu	90	156	1990–2007
4	21	Suranga Lakmal	69	107	2010–2022
5	18	Nuwan Pradeep	28	50	2011–2017
Last updated: 29 April 2023

== Bowling records ==
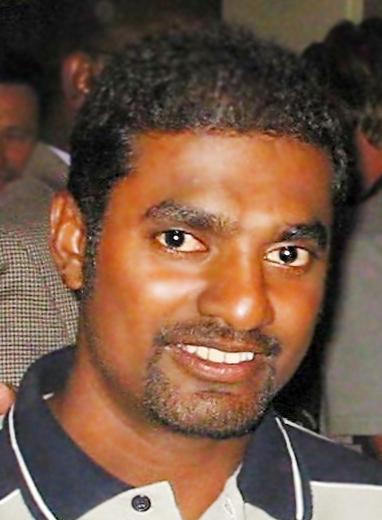
Muttiah Muralitharan dominates the bowling records for Sri Lanka.

=== Most wickets in a career ===
Muralitharan, who is the highest wicket-taker in Test cricket, has taken 5 wickets for the ICC World XI team during a match in 2005, which are not included in this list. Muralitharan and Shane Warne—who ranks second with 708 wickets—are the only bowlers who have captured more than 700 Test wickets.

Rank	Wickets	Player	Matches	Innings	Average	Period
1	795 ♠	Muttiah Muralitharan	132	228	22.67	1992–2010
2	433	Rangana Herath	93	170	28.07	1999–2018
3	355	Chaminda Vaas	111	194	29.58	1994–2009
4	171	Suranga Lakmal	70	122	36.44	2010–2022
5	161	Dilruwan Perera	43	78	35.9	2014–2021
6	122	Prabath Jayasuriya†	22	41	31.37	2022–2025
7	104	Lahiru Kumara†	34	57	36.04	2016–2025
8	101	Lasith Malinga	30	59	33.15	2004–2010
8	100	Dilhara Fernando	40	68	37.84	2000–2012
10	98	Sanath Jayasuriya	110	140	34.34	1991–2007
Last updated: 28 June 2025

=== Most career wickets against each team ===
Opposition	Wickets	Player	Matches	Innings	Average	Period	Ref
Afghanistan	8	Prabath Jayasuriya†	1	2	21.75	2024–2024	
Australia	66	Rangana Herath	11	19	22.63	1999–2016	
Bangladesh	89	Muttiah Muralitharan	11	22	13.37	2001–2009	
England	112	Muttiah Muralitharan	16	30	20.06	1993–2007	
India	105	Muttiah Muralitharan	22	32	32.61	1993–2010	
Ireland	17	Prabath Jayasuriya†	2	4	21.76	2023-2023	
New Zealand	68	Muttiah Muralitharan	14	25	25.97	1992–2009	
Pakistan	106	Rangana Herath	21	40	28.07	2000–2017	
South Africa	104	Muttiah Muralitharan	15	27	22.22	1993–2006	
West Indies	82	Muttiah Muralitharan	12	22	19.62	1993–2008	
Zimbabwe	87	Muttiah Muralitharan	14	26	16.86	1994–2004	
Last updated: 23 September 2024

=== Fastest wicket taker ===
Wickets	Bowler	Match	Record Date	Reference
50	Prabath Jayasuriya	7	24 April 2023	
100	Prabath Jayasuriya	17	27 November 2024	
150	Muttiah Muralitharan	36	14 January 1998	
200	Muttiah Muralitharan	42	27 August 1998	
250	Muttiah Muralitharan	51	12 March 2000	
300	Muttiah Muralitharan	58	26 December 2000	
350	Muttiah Muralitharan	66 ♠	6 September 2001	
400	Muttiah Muralitharan	72 ♠	12 January 2002	
450	Muttiah Muralitharan	80 ♠	3 May 2003	
500	Muttiah Muralitharan	87 ♠	16 March 2004	
600	Muttiah Muralitharan	101 ♠	8 March 2006	
700	Muttiah Muralitharan	113 ♠	11 July 2007	
750	Muttiah Muralitharan	122 ♠	31 July 2008	
800	Muttiah Muralitharan	133 ♠	18 July 2010	
Last updated: 30 November 2024

=== Best figures in an innings ===
Muttiah Muralitharan's 9 wickets for 51 runs against Zimbabwe is Test cricket's fifth-best bowling figures in a single innings. Also Rangana Herath's 9 wickets for 127 runs against Pakistan is the Best bowling figures by a left hand bowler in Test cricket history.

Rank	Figures	Player	Opposition	Venue	Date
1	9/51	Muttiah Muralitharan	Zimbabwe	Asgiriya Stadium, Kandy Sri Lanka	4 January 2002
2	9/65	Muttiah Muralitharan	England	The Oval, London, England	27 August 1998
3	9/127	Rangana Herath	Pakistan	Sinhalese Sports Club, Colombo, Sri Lanka	15 August 2014
4	8/46	Muttiah Muralitharan	West Indies	Asgiriya Stadium, Kandy, Sri Lanka	22 July 2005
5	8/63	Rangana Herath	Zimbabwe	Harare Sports Club, Harare, Zimbabwe	6 November 2016
Last updated: 23 September 2024

=== Best figures in an innings against each team ===
Opposition	Figures	Player	Venue	Date	Reference
Afghanistan	5/107	Prabath Jayasuriya	Sinhalese Sports Club Ground, Colombo	5 February 2024	
Australia	7/64	Rangana Herath	Sinhalese Sports Club Ground, Colombo	13 August 2016	
Bangladesh	7/89	Rangana Herath	R. Premadasa Stadium, Colombo	16 March 2013	
England	9/65	Muttiah Muralitharan	The Oval, London	27 August 1998	
India	8/87	Muttiah Muralitharan	Sinhalese Sports Club Ground, Colombo	29 August 2001	
Ireland	7/52	Prabath Jayasuriya	Galle International Stadium, Galle	18 April 2023	
New Zealand	6/42	Prabath Jayasuriya	Galle International Stadium, Galle	26 September 2024	
Pakistan	9/127	Rangana Herath	Sinhalese Sports Club, Colombo	15 August 2014	
South Africa	7/84	Muttiah Muralitharan	Galle International Stadium, Galle	20 July 2000	
West Indies	8/46	Muttiah Muralitharan	Asgiriya Stadium, Kandy	22 July 2005	
Zimbabwe	9/51	Muttiah Muralitharan	Asgiriya Stadium, Kandy	4 January 2002	
Last updated: 23 September 2024

=== Best figures in a match ===
The Sri Lankan record of 16 wickets for 220 runs set by Muttiah Muralitharan against England is the fifth-best figures by a bowler in a single Test match.

Rank	Figures	Player	Opposition	Venue	Date
1	16/220	Muttiah Muralitharan	England	The Oval, London, England	27 August 1998
2	14/184	Rangana Herath	Pakistan	Sinhalese Sports Club Ground, Colombo, Sri Lanka	16 August 2014
3	14/191	Chaminda Vaas	West Indies	Sinhalese Sports Club Ground, Colombo, Sri Lanka	29 November 2001
4	13/115	Muttiah Muralitharan	Zimbabwe	Asgiriya Stadium, Kandy, Sri Lanka	4 January 2002
5	13/145	Rangana Herath	Australia	Sinhalese Sports Club Ground, Colombo, Sri Lanka	17 August 2016
Last updated: 23 September 2024

=== Best career average ===
Bowling average is the measurement of mean runs conceded per wicket. In calculating this the total number of runs conceded by the bowler is divided by the number of wickets captured.

Rank	Average	Player	Wickets	Runs	Balls	Period
1	22.67	Muttiah Muralitharan	795	18,023	43,715	1992–2010
2	27.33	Asitha Fernando†	80	2,187	3,721	2021–2025
3	28.07	Rangana Herath	433	12,157	25,993	1999–2018
4	29.58	Chaminda Vaas	355	10,501	23,438	1994–2009
4	29.58	Kasun Rajitha†	55	1,627	2,996	2018–2024
5	31.37	Prabath Jayasuriya†	122	3,828	7,163	2022–2025
Qualification: 2,000 deliveries. Last updated: 28 June 2025

=== Best career economy rate ===
A bowler's economy rate is the total number of runs they have conceded divided by the number of overs they have bowled.

Rank	Economy rate	Player	Wickets	Runs	Balls	Period
1	2.33	Don Anurasiri	41	1,548	3,973	1986–1998
2	2.46	Sanath Jayasuriya	98	3,366	8,188	1991–2007
3	2.47	Muttiah Muralitharan	795	18,023	43,715	1992–2010
4	2.52	Kumar Dharmasena	69	2,920	6,939	1993–2004
5	2.62	Jayananda Warnaweera	32	1,021	2,333	1984–1994
5	2.62	Arjuna Ranatunga	16	1,040	2,373	1984–2000
Qualification: 2,000 balls. Last updated: 23 September 2024

=== Best career strike rate ===
A bowler's strike rate is the total number of balls they have bowled divided by the number of wickets they have taken.

Rank	Strike rate	Player	Wickets	Runs	Balls	Period
1	46.51	Asitha Fernando†	80	2,187	3,721	2021–2025
2	51.57	Lasith Malinga	101	3,349	5,209	2004–2010
3	54.47	Kasun Rajitha†	55	1,627	2,996	2018–2024
4	54.59	Vishwa Fernando†	81	2,595	4,422	2016–2025
5	54.98	Muttiah Muralitharan	795	18,023	43,715	1992–2010
Qualification: 2,000 balls. Last updated: 28 June 2025

=== Most five-wicket hauls in an innings ===
Taking five or more wickets in a single innings (called a five-wicket haul, fifer or five-for) is considered a notable achievement for a bowler. Muralitharan is well ahead of other bowlers by number of five-wicket hauls in Tests with 67 to his name; Australian cricketer Shane Warne ranks in second place with only 37, 30 below Murali. Which shows the class of Murali in bowling compared to Warne.

Rank	Five-wicket hauls	Player	Innings	Balls	Wickets	Period
1	67 ♠	Muttiah Muralitharan	228	43,715	795	1992–2010
2	34	Rangana Herath	170	25,993	433	1999–2018
3	12	Prabath Jayasuriya†	41	7,163	122	2022–2025
3	12	Chaminda Vaas	194	23,438	355	1994–2009
5	8	Dilruwan Perera	78	10,805	161	2014–2021
Last updated: 28 June 2025

=== Most ten-wickets in a match ===
Muralitharan has taken ten or more wickets in a match on more occasions than any other bowler in Test cricket. He has performed this feat 22 times, more than double the number of the bowler ranking second—Shane Warne, who has achieved this on 10 occasions.

Rank	Ten-wicket hauls	Player	Matches	Balls	Wickets	Period
1	22 ♠	Muttiah Muralitharan	132	43,715	795	1992–2010
2	9	Rangana Herath	93	25,993	433	1999–2018
3	2	Prabath Jayasuriya†	22	7,163	122	2022–2025
3	2	Dilruwan Perera	43	10,805	161	2014–2021
3	2	Chaminda Vaas	111	23,438	355	1994–2009
Last updated: 9 February 2025

=== Worst figures in an innings ===
Rank	Figures	Player	Overs	Opposition	Venue	Date
1	0/164	Lahiru Kumara	25	New Zealand	Basin Reserve, Wellington, New Zealand	17 March 2023
2	0/144	Kasun Rajitha	34	New Zealand	Basin Reserve, Wellington, New Zealand	15 December 2018
3	0/141	Asoka de Silva	56	New Zealand	Basin Reserve, Wellington, New Zealand	31 January 1991
4	0/139	Ramesh Mendis	36	Pakistan	Singhalese Sports Club Cricket Ground, Colombo, Sri Lanka	24 July 2023
5	0/137	Muttiah Muralitharan	46	India	Vidarbha Cricket Association Stadium, Nagpur, India	26 November 1997
Last updated: 23 September 2024

=== Worst figures in a match ===
Rank	Figures	Player	Overs	Opposition	Venue	Date
1	0/164	Dilruwan Perera	47	Australia	Manuka Oval, Canberra, Australia	1 February 2019
1	0/164	Lahiru Kumara	25	New Zealand	Basin Reserve, Wellington, New Zealand	17 March 2023
3	0/155	Praveen Jayawickrama	51	Bangladesh	Sher-e-Bangla National Cricket Stadium, Dhaka, Bangladesh	23 May 2022
4	0/154	Chaminda Vaas	40	Australia	Cazaly's Stadium, Cairns, Australia	9 July 2004
5	0/151	Nuwan Pradeep	32	Pakistan	Sinhalese Sports Club Ground, Colombo, Sri Lanka	30 June 2012
Last updated:23 September 2024

=== Most wickets in a series ===
Rank	Wickets	Player	Matches	BBI	BBM	5w/10w	Series
1	30	Muttiah Muralitharan	3	9/51	13/115	2/1	Zimbabwean cricket team in Sri Lanka in 2001–02
2	28	Rangana Herath	3	7/64	13/145	3/1	Australian cricket team in Sri Lanka in 2016
2	28	Muttiah Muralitharan	3	6/59	11/212	4/1	Australian cricket team in Sri Lanka in 2003–04
3	26	Muttiah Muralitharan	3	6/28	12/82	3/1	Bangladeshi cricket team in Sri Lanka in 2007
3	26	Muttiah Muralitharan	3	7/46	11/93	1/1	English cricket team in Sri Lanka in 2003–04
3	26	Muttiah Muralitharan	3	7/84	13/171	3/1	South African cricket team in Sri Lanka in 2000
3	26	Muttiah Muralitharan	3	6/71	10/148	1/1	Sri Lankan cricket team in Pakistan in 1999-2000
3	26	Chaminda Vaas	3	7/71	14/191	2/1	West Indian cricket team in Sri Lanka in 2001–02
3	26	Ajantha Mendis	3	6/117	10/209	2/1	Indian cricket team in Sri Lanka in 2008
Last updated: 23 September 2024

=== Hat-trick ===
In cricket, a hat-trick occurs when a bowler takes three wickets with consecutive deliveries. The deliveries may be interrupted by an over bowled by another bowler from the other end of the pitch or the other team's innings, but must be three consecutive deliveries by the individual bowler in the same match. Only wickets attributed to the bowler count towards a hat-trick; run outs do not count.

No.	Bowler	Against	Inn.	Test	Dismissals	Venue	Date	Ref.
1	Nuwan Zoysa	Zimbabwe	1	2/3	Trevor Gripper (lbw); Murray Goodwin (c Romesh Kaluwitharana); Neil Johnson (lbw)	(Zimbabwe) Harare Sports Club, Harare	26 November 1999	
2	Rangana Herath	Australia	1	2/3	Adam Voges (c Dimuth Karunaratne); Peter Nevill (lbw); Mitchell Starc (lbw)	(Sri Lanka) Galle International Stadium, Galle	5 August 2016	

== Wicket-keeping records ==
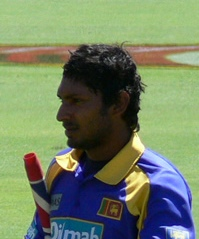
Former Sri Lankan captain Kumar Sangakkara has assisted in the highest number of dismissals as wicketkeeper.

A wicketkeeper can assist in the dismissal of a batsman by taking a catch or stumping. A catch taken by the wicketkeeper means the batsman will be ruled out caught, although it may be referred to as "caught behind". A stumping occurs when the wicketkeeper catches a ball delivered by the bowler (provided it is a legal delivery) and putting down the batsman's wicket while he is out of his ground.

=== Most dismissals ===
Rank	Dismissals	Player	Matches	Innings	Catches	Stumping	Dis/Inn	Period
1	160	Niroshan Dickwella†	54	96	133	27	1.666	2014–2023
2	156	Prasanna Jayawardene	58	102	124	32	1.529	2000–2015
3	151	Kumar Sangakkara	134	90	131	20	1.677	2000–2015
4	119	Romesh Kaluwitharana	49	85	93	26	1.400	1992–2004
5	81	Dinesh Chandimal†	90	54	71	10	1.500	2011–2025
Last updated: 23 September 2024

=== Most catches ===
Rank	Catches	Player	Matches	Innings	Period
1	133	Niroshan Dickwella†	54	96	2014–2023
2	131	Kumar Sangakkara	134	90	2000–2015
3	124	Prasanna Jayawardene	58	102	2000–2015
4	93	Romesh Kaluwitharana	49	85	1992–2004
5	71	Dinesh Chandimal†	90	54	2011–2025
Last updated: 23 September 2024

=== Most stumpings ===
Rank	Stumpings	Player	Matches	Innings	Period
1	32	Prasanna Jayawardene	58	102	2000–2015
2	27	Niroshan Dickwella†	54	96	2014–2022
3	26	Romesh Kaluwitharana	49	85	1992–2004
4	20	Kumar Sangakkara	134	90	2000–2015
5	10	Dinesh Chandimal†	90	54	2011–2025
Last updated: 23 September 2024

=== Most dismissals in an innings ===
Rank	Dismissals	Player	Opposition	Venue	Date
1	6	Amal Silva	India	Sinhalese Sports Club Ground, Colombo, Sri Lanka	30 August 1985
1	6	Dinesh Chandimal†	Pakistan	Paikiasothy Saravanamuttu Stadium, Colombo, Sri Lanka	25 June 2015
Last updated: 23 September 2024

=== Most dismissals in a match ===
Rank	Dismissals	Player	Opposition	Venue	Date
1	9	Amal Silva	India	Sinhalese Sports Club Ground, Colombo, Sri Lanka	30 August 1985
1	9	Amal Silva	India	Paikiasothy Saravanamuttu Stadium, Colombo, Sri Lanka	6 September 1985
1	9	Prasanna Jayawardene	Pakistan	Dubai International Cricket Stadium, Dubai, UAE	8 January 2014
4	8	Dinesh Chandimal	Pakistan	Paikiasothy Saravanamuttu Stadium, Colombo, Sri Lanka	25 June 2015
5	7	Hashan Tillakaratne	New Zealand	Seddon Park, Hamilton, New Zealand	22 February 1991
5	7	Chamara Dunusinghe	New Zealand	McLean Park, Napier, New Zealand	11 March 1995
5	7	Prasanna Jayawardene	Bangladesh	Zohur Ahmed Chowdhury Stadium, Chittagong, Bangladesh	3 January 2009
5	7	Prasanna Jayawardene	Pakistan	Sharjah Cricket Stadium, Sharjah, UAE	16 January 2014
5	7	Niroshan Dickwella	Pakistan	Sinhalese Sports Club Ground, Colombo, Sri Lanka	14 August 2014
5	7	Niroshan Dickwella	West Indies	Sir Vivian Richards Stadium, North Sound, Antigua and Barbuda	29 March 2021
5	7	Dinesh Chandimal	South Africa	Newlands, Cape Town, South Africa	2 January 2017
5	7	Niroshan Dickwella	West Indies	Sir Vivian Richards Stadium, Antigua, Antigua & Barboda	29 March 2021
Last updated: 23 September 2024

=== Most dismissals in a series ===
Rank	Dismissals	Player	Matches	Innings	Series
1	22	Amal Silva	3	6	Indian cricket team in Sri Lanka in 1985
2	18	Prasanna Jayawardene	3	6	Sri Lankan cricket team against Pakistan in the UAE in 2013–14
3	15	Hashan Tillakaratne	3	6	Sri Lankan cricket team in New Zealand in 1990–91
3	15	Dinesh Chandimal	3	5	Pakistan cricket team in Sri Lanka in 2015
5	14	Dinesh Chandimal	3	6	Sri Lankan cricket team in South Africa in 2016-17
Last updated: 23 September 2024

== Fielding records ==
=== Most catches in a career ===
A "catch" occurs when a ball hit by the batsman in the air is held by a fielder within the field of play, before it hits the ground. In such a case, the batsman is ruled out caught.

Rank	Catches	Player	Matches	Innings	Ct/Inn	Period
1	205	Mahela Jayawardene	149	270	0.759	1997–2014
2	88	Hashan Tillakaratne	83	123	0.723	1989–2004
3	87	Dananjaya de Silva†	65	118	0.737	2016–2025
4	83	Kusal Mendis†	73	114	0.728	2015–2025
5	78	Sanath Jayasuriya	110	196	0.397	1991–2007
5	78	Angelo Mathews	119	217	0.359	2009–2025
Last updated: 28 June 2025

=== Most catches in a series ===
Rank	Catches	Player	Matches	Innings	Series
1	10	Mahela Jayawardene	3	6	Bangladeshi cricket team in Sri Lanka in 2007
2	9	Mahela Jayawardene	3	6	Sri Lankan cricket team in Pakistan in 1999-00
2	9	Mahela Jayawardene	3	5	Indian cricket team in Sri Lanka in 2010
3	8	Hashan Tillakaratne	2	4	New Zealand cricket team in Sri Lanka in 1992-93
3	8	Roshan Mahanama	2	4	Zimbabwean cricket team in Sri Lanka in 1996
3	8	Roshan Mahanama	2	3	Sri Lankan cricket team in New Zealand in 1996-97
3	8	Sanath Jayasuriya	3	6	New Zealand cricket team in Sri Lanka in 1998
3	8	Mahela Jayawardene	2	4	Sri Lankan cricket team in Zimbabwe in 2004
3	8	Kusal Mendis	3	6	Sri Lankan cricket team in the West Indies in 2018
3	8	Dhananjaya de Silva	3	6	English cricket team in Sri Lanka in 2018-19
3	8	Dhananjaya de Silva	2	4	West Indian cricket team in Sri Lanka in 2021-22
Last updated: 23 September 2024

== All-round Records ==
=== 1000 runs and 100 wickets ===
A total of 71 players have achieved the double of 1000 runs and 100 wickets in their Test career.

Rank	Player	Average Difference	Period	Matches	Runs	Bat Avg	Wickets	Bowl Avg
1	Chaminda Vaas	−5.25	1994-2009	111	3089	24.32	355	29.58
2	Muttiah Muralitharan	−10.79	1992-2010	132	1259	11.87	795	22.67
3	Rangana Herath	−13.42	1999-2018	93	1699	14.64	433	28.07
4	Dilruwan Perera	−17.01	2014-2021	43	1303	18.88	161	35.90
Last updated: 23 September 2024

== Other records ==
=== Most career matches ===
Rank	Matches	Player	Runs	Wkts	Period
1	149	Mahela Jayawardene	11,814	6	1997–2014
2	134	Kumar Sangakkara	12,400	0	2000–2015
3	132	Muttiah Muralitharan	1,259	795	1992–2010
4	119	Angelo Mathews	8,214	33	2009–2025
5	111	Chaminda Vaas	3,089	355	1994–2009
Last updated: 21 June 2025

=== Most consecutive career matches ===
Rank	Matches	Player	Period
1	93	Mahela Jayawardene	2002–2013
2	53	Marvan Atapattu	1997–2002
Last updated: 23 September 2024

=== Most matches played as captain ===
Rank	Matches	Player	Won	Lost	Tied	Draw	%W	%L	Period
1	56	Arjuna Ranatunga	12	19	0	25	21.42	33.92	1989–1999
2	38	Sanath Jayasuriya	18	12	0	8	47.36	31.57	1999–2002
2	38	Mahela Jayawardene	18	12	0	8	47.36	31.57	2006–2009
4	34	Angelo Mathews	13	15	0	6	38.23	44.11	2013–2017
5	30	Dimuth Karunaratne	12	12	0	6	40.00	40.00	2019–2023
Last updated: 23 September 2024

=== Most man of the match awards ===
Rank	M.O.M. Awards	Player	Matches	Period
1	19	Muttiah Muralitharan	132	1992–2010
2	16	Kumar Sangakkara	134	2000–2015
3	13	Mahela Jayawardene	149	1997–2014
4	11	Aravinda de Silva	93	1984–2002
4	11	Rangana Herath	93	1999–2018
Last updated: 23 September 2024

=== Most man of the series awards ===
Rank	M.O.S. Awards	Player	Matches	Period
1	11	Muttiah Muralitharan	132	1992–2010
2	5	Rangana Herath	93	1999–2018
3	4	Dimuth Karunaratne	84	2012–2023
3	4	Aravinda de Silva	93	1984–2002
3	4	Angelo Mathews	119	2009–2025
3	4	Kumar Sangakkara	134	2000–2015
Last updated: 21 June 2025

=== Youngest players on Debut ===
Rank	Age	Player	Opposition	Venue	Date
1	17 years and 189 days	Sanjeewa Weerasinghe	India	Paikiasothy Saravanamuttu Stadium, Colombo, Sri Lanka	6 September 1985
2	18 years and 78 days	Arjuna Ranatunga	England	Paikiasothy Saravanamuttu Stadium, Colombo, Sri Lanka	17 February 1982
3	18 years and 81 days	Roshan Jurangpathy	India	Asgiriya Stadium, Kandy, Sri Lanka	14 September 1985
4	18 years and 147 days	Malinga Bandara	New Zealand	R Premadasa Stadium, Colombo, Sri Lanka	27 May 1998
5	18 years and 298 days	Nuwan Zoysa	New Zealand	Carisbrook, Dunedin, New Zealand	7 March 1997
Last updated: 23 September 2024

=== Oldest players on debut ===
Rank	Age	Player	Opposition	Venue	Date
1	39 years and 251 days	Somachandra de Silva	England	Paikiasothy Saravanamuttu Stadium, Colombo, Sri Lanka	17 February 1982
2	32 years and 237 days	Lalith Kaluperuma	England	Paikiasothy Saravanamuttu Stadium, Colombo, Sri Lanka	17 February 1982
3	31 years and 330 days	Mahela Udawatte	West Indies	Darren Sammy National Cricket Stadium, Gros Islet, Saint Lucia	14 June 2018
4	31 years and 266 days	Mithra Wettimuny	New Zealand	Lancaster Park, Christchurch, New Zealand	4 March 1983
5	31 years and 236 days	Sridharan Jeganathan	New Zealand	Lancaster Park, Christchurch, New Zealand	4 March 1983
Last updated: 23 September 2024

=== Oldest players ===
Rank	Age	Player	Opposition	Venue	Date
1	42 years and 73 days	Somachandra de Silva	England	Lord's, London, England	23 August 1984
2	40 years and 232 days	Rangana Herath	England	Galle International Stadium, Galle, Sri Lanka	6 November 2018
3	38 years and 184 days	Dilruwan Perera	England	Galle International Stadium, Galle, Sri Lanka	22 January 2021
4	38 years and 154 days	Sanath Jayasuriya	England	Asgiriya Stadium, Kandy, Sri Lanka	1 December 2007
5	38 years and 92 days	Muttiah Muralitharan	India	Galle International Stadium, Galle, Sri Lanka	18 July 2008
Last updated: 23 September 2024

== Partnership records ==
=== Highest wicket partnerships ===
Sri Lanka holds the highest partnerships in Test cricket for any wicket and, with the records for the second, and third wickets.

Wicket	Runs	1st batsman	2nd batsman	Opposition	Venue	Date
1st wicket	335	Sanath Jayasuriya	Marvan Atapattu	Pakistan	Asgiriya Stadium, Kandy	28 June 2000
2nd wicket ♠	576	Sanath Jayasuriya	Roshan Mahanama	India	R. Premadasa Stadium, Colombo	2 August 1997
3rd wicket ♠	624	Kumar Sangakkara	Mahela Jayawardene	South Africa	SSC Ground, Colombo	27 July 2006
4th wicket	437	Thilan Samaraweera	Mahela Jayawardene	Pakistan	National Stadium, Karachi	21 February 2009
5th wicket	280	Thilan Samaraweera	Tillakaratne Dilshan	Bangladesh	P Sara Oval, Colombo	20 September 2005
6th wicket	351	Mahela Jayawardene	Prasanna Jayawardene	India	Sardar Patel Stadium, Ahmedabad	16 November 2009
7th wicket	223*	Chaminda Vaas	Prasanna Jayawardene	Bangladesh	SSC Ground, Colombo	25 June 2007
8th wicket	170	Chaminda Vaas	Mahela Jayawardene	South Africa	Galle International Stadium, Galle	4 August 2004
9th wicket	124	Dhananjaya de Silva	Lasith Embuldeniya	West Indies	Galle International Stadium, Galle	29 November 2021
10th wicket	79	Chaminda Vaas	Muttiah Muralitharan	Australia	Asgiriya Stadium, Kandy	16 March 2004
Last updated: 23 September 2024

=== Highest partnerships ===
The world record partnership between Jayawardene and Sangakkara for 624 runs, and the partnership between Jayasuriya and Mahanama for 576 runs (which was the previous world record, and is now the second-highest partnership in Tests) are the only Test partnerships to surpass 500 runs.

Runs	Wicket	1st batsman	2nd batsman	Opposition	Venue	Date
624 ♠	3rd wicket	Kumar Sangakkara	Mahela Jayawardene	South Africa	SSC Ground, Colombo	27 July 2006
576 ♠	2nd wicket	Sanath Jayasuriya	Roshan Mahanama	India	R. Premadasa Stadium, Colombo	2 August 1997
438	2nd wicket	Marvan Atapattu	Kumar Sangakkara	Zimbabwe	Queens Sports Club, Bulawayo	14 May 2004
437	4th wicket	Mahela Jayawardene	Thilan Samaraweera	Pakistan	National Stadium, Karachi	21 February 2009
351	6th wicket	Mahela Jayawardene	Prasanna Jayawardene	India	Sardar Patel Stadium, Ahmedabad	16 November 2009
Last updated: 23 September 2024

=== Highest overall partnership runs by a pair ===
Rank	Runs	Innings	Players	Highest	Average	100/50	T20I career span
1	6,554	120	Mahela Jayawardene & Kumar Sangakkara	624	56.5	19/27	2000–2014
2	4,533	122	Marvan Atapattu & Sanath Jayasuriya	335	39.41	9/24	2004–2012
3	3,247	55	Mahela Jayawardene & Thilan Samaraweera	437	61.26	11/9	2003–2013
4	3,243	79	Dinesh Chandimal & Angelo Mathews	232	44.42	8/15	2012–2025
5	2,812	57	Aravinda de Silva & Arjuna Ranatunga	189*	53.05	11/11	1985–2000
An asterisk (*) signifies an unbroken partnership (i.e. neither of the batsmen was dismissed before either the end of the allotted overs or the required score being reached). Last updated: 21 June 2025

== Umpiring records ==
Rank	Matches	Umpire	Period
1	91	Kumar Dharmasena†	2010–2025
2	49	Asoka de Silva	2000–2011
3	25	K. T. Francis	1982–1999
4	21	B. C. Cooray	1992–2001
5	11	Peter Manuel	1993–2001
Last updated: 1 December 2024

== See also ==
- Cricket statistics
- List of Test cricket records
