= Indian cricket team in Sri Lanka in 1985 =

International cricket tour

	Sri Lanka	India
- Dates: 25 August – 22 September 1985
Captains	Duleep Mendis	Kapil Dev

Test series
- Result: Sri Lanka won the 3-match series 1–0
Most runs	Duleep Mendis (310)	Mohinder Amarnath (216)
Most wickets	Rumesh Ratnayake (20)	Chetan Sharma (14)

One Day International series
- Results: 3-match series drawn 1–1
Most runs	Roy Dias (119)	Dilip Vengsarkar (194)
Most wickets	Rumesh Ratnayake (4)	Chetan Sharma (5)
- Player of the series: Dilip Vengsarkar (Ind)

The Indian cricket team toured Sri Lanka from 25 August to 22 September 1985. The tour consisted of three Test matches and three One Day Internationals (ODIs). Sri Lanka won the second Test of the series.

== Test Series ==
=== 1st Test ===
30 Aug-4 Sep 1985
scorecard

India	v	Sri Lanka
218 (97.2 overs); Sunil Gavaskar 51; Ashantha de Mel 5/64 (28 overs)		347 (144.4 overs); Arjuna Ranatunga 111; Kapil Dev 3/74 (30.4 overs)
251 (119.3 overs); Dilip Vengsarkar 98; Rumesh Ratnayake 6/85 (41 overs)		61/4 (8 overs); Aravinda de Silva 21; Kapil Dev 2/36 (4 overs)

Match drawn
Sinhalese Sports Club Ground, Colombo
Umpires: HC Felsinger, KT Francis

- India won the toss and decided to bat

=== 2nd Test ===
6–11 September 1985
scorecard

Sri Lanka	v	India
385 (156.3 overs); Amal Silva 111; Chetan Sharma 5/118 (33 overs)		244 (95.1 overs); K Srikkanth 64; Rumesh Ratnayake 4/76 (25.1 overs)
206/3 d. (53 overs); Aravinda de Silva 75; Ravi Shastri 1/41 (13 overs)		198 (66.2 overs); Kapil Dev 78; Rumesh Ratnayake 5/49 (23.2 overs)

Sri Lanka won by 149 runs
P Saravanamuttu Stadium, Colombo
Umpires: S Ponnadurai, PW Vidanagamage

- Sri Lanka won the toss and decided to bat

=== 3rd Test ===
14–19 September 1985
scorecard

India	v	Sri Lanka
249 (84.3 overs); Dilip Vengsarkar 62; Saliya Ahangama 5/52 (24 overs)		198 (63.3 overs); Duleep Mendis 53; Maninder Singh 4/31 (12.3 overs)
325/5 d. (84 overs); Mohinder Amarnath 116; Saliya Ahangama 3/72 (27 overs)		307/7 (102 overs); Duleep Mendis 124; Chetan Sharma 3/65 (20 overs)

Match drawn
Asgiriya Stadium, Kandy
Umpires: DP Buultjens, MDDN Gooneratne

- India won the toss and decided to bat

== One Day Internationals (ODIs) ==
=== 1st ODI ===
25 August 1985
Scorecard

Sri Lanka; 241/6 (45 overs)	v	India; 242/8 (44.3 overs)
RL Dias 80 (67); C Sharma 3/50 (9 overs)		DB Vengsarkar 89 (82); RJ Ratnayake 2/35 (9 overs)

India won by 2 wickets
Sinhalese Sports Club Ground, Colombo
Umpires: HC Felsinger and PW Vidanagamage
Player of the match: RL Dias (SL)

- India won the toss and elected to field.
- G Sharma (IND) made his ODI debut.

=== 2nd ODI ===
21 September 1985
Scorecard

Sri Lanka; 171/5 (28 overs)	v	India; 157/4 (28 overs)
RS Madugalle 50* (39); RJ Shastri 1/22 (6 overs)		DB Vengsarkar 50 (46); VB John 2/26 (6 overs)

Sri Lanka won by 14 runs
P Saravanamuttu Stadium, Colombo
Umpires: BC Cooray and KT Francis
Player of the match: RS Madugalle (SL)

- India won the toss and elected to field.
- The match was reduced before play started from 45 to 28 overs per side.

=== 3rd ODI ===
22 September 1985
Scorecard

India; 194/6 (40 overs)	v	Sri Lanka; 32/4 (9.2 overs)
DB Vengsarkar 55 (55); RJ Ratnayake 2/41 (7 overs)		LRD Mendis 14* (22); C Sharma 2/11 (4.2 overs)

No result
P Saravanamuttu Stadium, Colombo
Umpires: DCC Perera and KT Ponnambalam
Player of the match: DB Vengsarkar (IND)

- Sri Lanka won the toss and elected to field.
- The match was reduced before play started from 45 to 40 overs per side.
- Sri Lanka's revised target was 72 runs in 15 overs.
