= 1998 Nidahas Trophy =

International cricket tournament

- Dates: 19 June – 7 July
- Administrator(s): Sri Lanka Cricket (SLC)
- Cricket format: One Day International
- Tournament format(s): Round-robin and Knockout
- Host(s): Sri Lanka
- Champions: India (1st title)
- Runners-up: Sri Lanka
- Participants: 3
- Matches: 10
- Player of the series: (Sri Lanka) Aravinda de Silva
- Most runs: (Sri Lanka) Aravinda de Silva (368)
- Most wickets: (India) Ajit Agarkar (12)

The 1998 Nidahas Trophy, known as the Singer Akai Nidahas Trophy for sponsorship reasons, was a One Day International cricket tournament staged in Sri Lanka between 19 June and 7 July 1998, to commemorate the 50 years of Sri Lanka's independence and Sri Lanka Cricket, known then as the Board of Control for Cricket in Sri Lanka, the governing body of cricket in Sri Lanka.

The competition involved Sri Lanka, India and New Zealand. Each team played every other team three times, and the two teams with most points progressed to the final. The event was marred by rain, with five of the nine qualifying matches abandoned. Sri Lanka won three matches while India won one in the group stage, before India won the final beating the former by 6 runs. Sri Lanka's Aravinda de Silva who scored 368 runs was named player of the series.

== Squads ==
Sri Lanka	India	New Zealand
Arjuna Ranatunga (c); Aravinda de Silva; Romesh Kaluwitharana (wk); Marvan Atapattu; Sanath Jayasuriya; Mahela Jayawardene; Roshan Mahanama; Kumar Dharmasena; Muttiah Muralitharan; Pramodya Wickramasinghe; Suresh Perera; Avishka Gunawardene; Niroshan Bandaratilleke; Upul Chandana	Mohammad Azharuddin (c); Ajay Jadeja (vc); Ajit Agarkar; Sourav Ganguly; Harbhajan Singh; Hrishikesh Kanitkar; Gagan Khoda; Anil Kumble; Debashish Mohanty; Nayan Mongia (wk); Venkatesh Prasad; Rahul Sanghvi; Robin Singh; Sachin Tendulkar	Stephen Fleming (c); Craig Spearman; Nathan Astle; Bryan Young; Craig McMillan; Chris Harris; Dion Nash; Paul Wiseman; Adam Parore (wk); Matt Horne; Shayne O'Connor; Daniel Vettori; Chris Cairns; Mark Priest

== Round-robin ==
Team	Pld	W	L	NR	T	Pts	NRR
Sri Lanka	6	3	1	2	0	8	+0.623
India	6	1	1	4	0	6	+0.320
New Zealand	6	0	2	4	0	4	–1.429
Source: ESPN Cricinfo

=== Matches ===
19 June (D/N)
Scorecard

Sri Lanka; 243/6 (50 overs)	v	India; 246/2 (43.4 overs)
Aravinda de Silva 97 (119); Ajit Agarkar 2/38 (9 overs)		Sourav Ganguly 80 (114); Muttiah Muralitharan 2/48 (10 overs)

India won by 8 wickets
R. Premadasa Stadium, Colombo
Umpires: K. T. Francis (SL) and Peter Manuel (SL)
Player of the match: Sourav Ganguly (Ind)

- Sri Lanka won the toss and elected to bat.
- Suresh Perera (SL) made his ODI debut.
- Points: India 2, Sri Lanka 0.

21 June (D/N)
Scorecard

New Zealand; 200/9 (50 overs)	v	Sri Lanka; 201/3 (40 overs)
Bryan Young 55 (52); Upul Chandana 3/24 (7 overs)		Marvan Atapattu 83* (118); Nathan Astle 1/2 (3 overs)

Sri Lanka won by 7 wickets
R. Premadasa Stadium, Colombo
Umpires: B. C. Cooray (SL) and Nandasena Pathirana (SL)
Player of the match: Marvan Atapattu (SL)

- New Zealand won the toss and elected to bat.
- Niroshan Bandaratilleke made his ODI debut.
- Points: Sri Lanka 2, New Zealand 0.

23 June (D/N)
Scorecard

New Zealand; 219/8 (50 overs)	v	India; 131/2 (24.2 overs)
Nathan Astle 81 (119); Ajit Agarkar 3/52 (9 overs)		Mohammad Azharuddin 53* (53); Chris Cairns 1/36 (5 overs)

No result
R. Premadasa Stadium, Colombo
Umpires: K. T. Francis (SL) and T. M. Samarasinghe (SL)

- India won the toss and elected to field.
- India was set a target of 147 in 25 overs, but rain stopped play at 20:20, four balls short of what was required for a result.
- Points: India 1, New Zealand 1.

25 June
Scorecard

Sri Lanka	v	India

No result
Galle International Stadium, Galle
Umpires: Peter Manuel (SL) and Udaya Wickramasinghe (SL)

- No toss.
- The match was abandoned due to a waterlogged ground from overnight rain and heavy rain at 10:00 in the morning.
- Points: Sri Lanka 1, India 1.

27 June
Scorecard

Sri Lanka	v	New Zealand

No result
Galle International Stadium, Galle
Umpires: K. T. Francis (SL) and Udaya Wickramasinghe (SL)

- No toss.
- The match was abandoned due to persistent rain.
- Points: Sri Lanka 1, New Zealand 1.

29 June
Scorecard

India	v	New Zealand

No result
Galle International Stadium, Galle
Umpires: Ignatius Anandappa (SL) and B. C. Cooray (SL)

- No toss.
- The match was abandoned after the umpires decided that the clearing the wet outfield that followed the rain would not be completed by 13:30 to play the required 25 overs per side to constitute a match.
- Points: India 1, New Zealand 1.

1 July
Scorecard

Sri Lanka; 171/8 (36 overs)	v	India; 163 (35.3 overs)
Aravinda de Silva 62 (86); Ajit Agarkar 3/38 (7 overs)		Robin Singh 50 (74); Sanath Jayasuriya 4/18 (5.4 overs)

Sri Lanka won by 8 runs
Sinhalese Sports Club Ground, Colombo
Umpires: Ignatius Anandappa (SL) and B. C. Cooray (SL)
Player of the match: Aravinda de Silva (SL)

- India won the toss and elected to field.
- The start was delayed by three hours due to rain, reducing the match to 36 overs per side.
- Points: Sri Lanka 2, India 0.

3 July
Scorecard

New Zealand; 128/5 (31.1 overs)	v	India
Craig McMillan 26 (39); Harbhajan Singh 2/26 (8 overs)

No result
Sinhalese Sports Club Ground, Colombo
Umpires: B. C. Cooray (SL) and Nandasena Pathirana (SL)

- New Zealand won the toss and elected to bat.
- Persistent rain after 31.1 overs into New Zealand's innings led to the abandonment of the match.
- Points: India 1, New Zealand 1.

5 July
Scorecard

Sri Lanka; 293/4 (50 overs)	v	New Zealand; 206 (39.1 overs)
Arjuna Ranatunga 102 (98); Chris Harris 2/44 (10 overs)		Nathan Astle 74 (76); Sanath Jayasuriya 3/28 (8 overs)

Sri Lanka won by 87 runs
Sinhalese Sports Club Ground, Colombo
Umpires: Peter Manuel (SL) and T. M. Samarasinghe (SL)
Player of the match: Arjuna Ranatunga (SL)

- New Zealand won the toss and elected to field.
- Points: Sri Lanka 2, New Zealand 0.

== Final ==
7 July (D/N)
Scorecard

India; 307/6 (50 overs)	v	Sri Lanka; 301 (49.3 overs)
Sachin Tendulkar 128 (131); Sanath Jayasuriya 2/42 (9 overs)		Aravinda de Silva 105 (94); Ajit Agarkar 4/53 (10 overs)

India won by 6 runs
R. Premadasa Stadium, Colombo
Umpires: K. T. Francis (SL) and Peter Manuel (SL)
Player of the match: Sachin Tendulkar (Ind)

- India won the toss and elected to bat.
- Sachin Tendulkar and Sourav Ganguly (Ind) broke the record for highest partnership for the first wicket in ODIs (252 runs), before the pair bettered it in 2001.
- Sachin Tendulkar passed 7,000 runs in ODIs. He equalled Desmond Haynes' (WI) record for most centuries in ODIs (17).
- India won the 1998 Nidahas Trophy.
