= English cricket team in Sri Lanka in 1992–93 =

International cricket tour

	Sri Lanka	England
- Dates: 10 March 1993 – 20 March 1993
Captains	Arjuna Ranatunga	Alec Stewart

Test series
- Result: Sri Lanka won the 1-match series 1–0
Most runs	Hashan Tillakaratne (129)	Robin Smith (163)
Most wickets	Jayananda Warnaweera (8)	Chris Lewis (5)
- Player of the series: Hashan Tillakaratne (SL)

One Day International series
- Results: Sri Lanka won the 2-match series 2–0
Most runs	Aravinda de Silva (109)	Graeme Hick (67)
Most wickets	Sanath Jayasuriya (8)	Ian Salisbury (2)

The England cricket team toured Sri Lanka in March 1993 for a single Test match and two one-day internationals. Sri Lanka won all three matches.

The opening day in the Test match clashed with the last day of the Royal–Thomian Cricket Encounter (Battle of the Blues), which attracted greater media interest in Sri Lanka.

== Squads ==
Tests		ODIs	
England	Sri Lanka	England	Sri Lanka
Alec Stewart (c)(wk); Robin Smith; Mike Atherton; Mike Gatting; Graeme Hick; Neil Fairbrother; Chris Lewis; John Emburey; Paul Jarvis; Phil Tufnell; Devon Malcolm	Arjuna Ranatunga (c); Ashley de Silva (wk); Roshan Mahanama; Chandika Hathurusingha; Asanka Gurusinha; Aravinda de Silva; Hashan Tillakaratne; Champaka Ramanayake; Sanath Jayasuriya; Jayananda Warnaweera; Muthiah Muralidaran	Alec Stewart (c)(wk); Robin Smith; Graeme Hick; Neil Fairbrother; Mike Gatting; Chris Lewis; Dermot Reeve; Phil DeFreitas; John Emburey; Paul Jarvis; Devon Malcolm; Ian Salisbury; Paul Taylor	Arjuna Ranatunga (c); Ashley de Silva (wk); Roshan Mahanama; Chandika Hathurusingha; Asanka Gurusinha; Aravinda de Silva; Hashan Tillakaratne; Dulip Liyanage; Ruwan Kalpage; Champaka Ramanayake; Pramodya Wickramasinghe; Muthiah Muralidaran; Sanath Jayasuriya

== Test series ==
=== Only Test ===
13 – 18 March
Scorecard

England	v	Sri Lanka
380 (130.1 overs); Robin Smith 128 (338); Jayananda Warnaweera 4/90 (40.1 overs)		469 (156.5 overs); Hashan Tillakaratne 93* (208); Chris Lewis 4/66 (31 overs)
228 (66 overs); John Emburey 59 (151); Jayananda Warnaweera 4/98 (25 overs)		142/5 (42.4 overs); Hashan Tillakaratne 36* (62); Phil Tufnell 2/34 (7.4 overs)

Sri Lanka won by 5 wickets
Sinhalese Sports Club Ground, Colombo
Umpires: K. T. Francis (SL) and T. M. Samarasinghe (SL)
Player of the match: Hashan Tillakaratne (SL)

- England won the toss and elected to bat
- Ashley de Silva (SL) made his debut
- Paul Jarvis (Eng) made his last appearance in Test matches.
- Muttiah Muralitharan achieved his best innings bowling analysis in Test matches in the England first innings (previous best was 4-134).
- Chris Lewis reached 50 wickets in Test matches when he dismissed Roshan Mahanama, his 1st wicket in the Sri Lanka second innings.

== ODI series ==
=== 1st ODI ===
10 March
14:30 (D/N)
Scorecard

Sri Lanka; 250/5 (47 overs)	v	England; 170 (36.1 overs)
Hashan Tillakaratne 66* (65); Devon Malcolm 3/32 (7 overs)		Neil Fairbrother 34 (55); Ruwan Kalpage 3/34 (8 overs)

Sri Lanka won by 32 runs (faster scoring rate)
R. Premadasa Stadium, Colombo
Umpires: K. T. Francis (SL) and Selliah Ponnadurai (SL)
Player of the match: Hashan Tillakaratne (SL)

- Sri Lanka won the toss and elected to bat.
- Sri Lanka's innings was reduced to 47 overs.
- England's innings was reduced to 38 overs with a target of 203.

=== 2nd ODI ===
20 March
10:30
Scorecard

England; 180 (48.5 overs)	v	Sri Lanka; 183/2 (36.1 overs)
Graeme Hick 36 (44); Sanath Jayasuriya 6/29 (9.5 overs)		Aravinda de Silva 75* (68); Ian Salisbury 2/36 (4 overs)

Sri Lanka won by 8 wickets
Tyronne Fernando Stadium, Moratuwa
Umpires: B. C. Cooray (SL) and T. M. Samarasinghe (SL)
Player of the match: Sanath Jayasuriya (SL)

- Sri Lanka won the toss and elected to field.
- Paul Taylor made his debut.

== Records and statistics ==
=== Batting ===
Test
Player	Nat	Matches	Innings	Runs	NO	Ave.	SR	HS	100	50	4s	6s
Robin Smith	(England)	1	2	163	0	81.50	39.85	128	1	0	24	0
Hashan Tillakaratne	(Sri Lanka)	1	2	129	2	-	47.77	93*	0	1	15	0
Arjuna Ranatunga	(Sri Lanka)	1	2	99	0	49.50	56.57	64	0	1	9	1
Graeme Hick	(England)	1	2	94	0	47.00	67.14	68	0	1	9	3
Aravinda de Silva	(Sri Lanka)	1	2	87	0	43.50	52.72	80	0	1	7	2
ODI
Player	Nat	Matches	Innings	Runs	NO	Ave.	SR	HS	100	50	4s	6s
Aravinda de Silva	(Sri Lanka)	2	2	109	1	109.00	99.09	75*	0	1	8	5
Chandika Hathurusingha	(Sri Lanka)	2	2	76	0	38.00	59.37	43	0	0	9	0
Graeme Hick	(England)	2	2	67	0	33.50	77.90	36	0	0	11	0
Hashan Tillakaratne	(Sri Lanka)	2	2	66	1	-	101.53	66*	0	1	6	0
Neil Fairbrother	(England)	2	2	55	0	27.50	53.92	34	0	0	2	1
Source: Cricinfo

=== Bowling ===
Test
Player	Nat	Matches	Innings	Wickets	Overs	Runs	Econ.	Ave.	BBI	5WI	10WI
Jayananda Warnaweera	(Sri Lanka)	1	2	8	65.1	188	2.88	23.50	4/90	0	0
Chris Lewis	(England)	1	2	5	39.0	87	2.23	17.40	4/66	0	0
Muthiah Muralidaran	(Sri Lanka)	1	2	5	61.0	173	2.83	34.60	4/118	0	0
John Emburey	(England)	1	2	4	48.0	165	3.43	41.25	2/48	0	0
Paul Jarvis	(England)	1	2	3	33.5	90	2.66	30.00	3/76	0	0
Phil Tufnell	(England)	1	2	3	40.4	142	3.49	47.33	2/34	0	0
ODI
Player	Nat	Matches	Innings	Wickets	Overs	Runs	Econ.	Ave.	BBI	4WI	5WI
Sanath Jayasuriya	(Sri Lanka)	2	2	8	16.5	74	4.39	9.25	6/29	0	1
Ruwan Kalpage	(Sri Lanka)	2	2	4	18.0	61	3.38	15.25	3/34	0	0
Pramodya Wickramasinghe	(Sri Lanka)	2	2	3	14.1	44	3.10	14.66	2/21	0	0
Ian Salisbury	(England)	1	1	2	4.0	36	9.00	18.00	2/36	0	0
Source: Cricinfo
