= Zimbabwean cricket team in Sri Lanka in 1997–98 =

International cricket tour

The Zimbabwe national cricket team toured Sri Lanka in January 1998 and played a two-match Test series against the Sri Lanka national cricket team followed by three Limited Overs Internationals (LOI). Sri Lanka won both Test matches to take the series 2–0. Sri Lanka were captained by Arjuna Ranatunga and Zimbabwe by Alistair Campbell. Sri Lanka won the LOI series 3-0.

== Test series summary ==
=== 1st Test ===
7–11 January 1998
(5-day match)
Scorecard

Sri Lanka	v	Zimbabwe
469/9d (154.3 overs); MS Atapattu 223 (448); AR Whittall 3/73 (30 overs)		140 (85.4 overs); GJ Rennie 53 (219); SD Anurasiri 3/106 (61 overs)
10/2 (1.5 overs); MS Atapattu 6* (5); HH Streak 2/4 (1 overs)		338 (f/o) (126.5 overs); MW Goodwin 70 (137); M Muralitharan 7/94 (42.5 overs)

Sri Lanka won by 8 wickets
Asgiriya Stadium, Kandy
Umpires: BC Cooray (SL) and MJ Kitchen (ENG)
Player of the match: M Muralitharan (SL)

- Sri Lanka won the toss and elected to bat.
- MW Goodwin (ZIM) made his Test debut.

=== 2nd Test ===
14–18 January 1998
(5-day match)
Scorecard

Zimbabwe	v	Sri Lanka
251 (90.2 overs); MW Goodwin 73 (128); SD Anurasiri 3/65 (27 overs)		225 (73.5 overs); A Ranatunga 52 (143); PA Strang 4/77 (19.5 overs)
299 (125.5 overs); A Flower 105* (238); M Muralitharan 3/73 (37.5 overs)		326/5 (113.5 overs); PA de Silva 143* (310); HH Streak 4/84 (25 overs)

Sri Lanka won by 5 wickets
Singhalese Sports Club Cricket Ground, Colombo
Umpires: KT Francis (SL) and Saleem Badar (PAK)
Player of the match: PA de Silva (SL)

- Zimbabwe won the toss and elected to bat.

== ODI series summary ==
=== 1st ODI ===
22 January 1998
Scorecard

Zimbabwe; 207 (48.4 overs)	v	Sri Lanka; 210/5 (45.2 overs)
GJ Whittall 52 (70); UDU Chandana 4/31 (7.4 overs)		A Ranatunga 58* (79); PA Strang 2/36 (10 overs)

Sri Lanka won by 5 wickets
Singhalese Sports Club Cricket Ground, Colombo
Umpires: PT Manuel (SL) and DN Pathirana (SL)
Player of the match: A Ranatunga (SL)

- Sri Lanka won the toss and elected to field.
- MW Goodwin (ZIM) made his ODI debut.

=== 2nd ODI ===
24 January 1998
Scorecard

Zimbabwe; 212/8 (50 overs)	v	Sri Lanka; 213/5 (48.2 overs)
MW Goodwin 111 (134); UDU Chandana 2/42 (9 overs)		RS Mahanama 52 (71); AR Whittall 2/33 (8.2 overs)

Sri Lanka won by 5 wickets
R. Premadasa Stadium, Colombo
Umpires: I Anandappa (SL) and WAU Wickramasinghe (SL)
Player of the match: MW Goodwin (ZIM)

- Zimbabwe won the toss and elected to bat.
- DPMD Jayawardene (SL) made his ODI debut.

=== 3rd ODI ===
26 January 1998
Scorecard

Zimbabwe; 281/6 (50 overs)	v	Sri Lanka; 286/6 (49 overs)
GW Flower 112 (138); HDPK Dharmasena 3/47 (10 overs)		ST Jayasuriya 102 (100); GW Flower 2/36 (7 overs)

Sri Lanka won by 4 wickets
Singhalese Sports Club Cricket Ground, Colombo
Umpires: PT Manuel (SL) and TM Samarasinghe (SL)
Player of the match: ST Jayasuriya (SL)

- Zimbabwe won the toss and elected to bat.
- DA Gunawardene and MN Nawaz (both SL) made their ODI debuts.
