= New Zealand cricket team in Sri Lanka in 1998 =

	Sri Lanka	New Zealand
- Dates: 27 May – 13 June 1998
Captains	Arjuna Ranatunga	Stephen Fleming

Test series
- Result: Sri Lanka won the 3-match series 2–1
Most runs	Mahela Jayawardene (300)	Stephen Fleming (357)
Most wickets	Muthiah Muralidaran (19)	Daniel Vettori (17)
- Player of the series: Muthiah Muralidaran (SL)

The New Zealand national cricket team toured Sri Lanka during the 1998 season, playing three Tests from 27 May to 13 June 1998. New Zealand was led by Stephen Fleming while Sri Lanka was led by Arjuna Ranatunga. Sri Lanka won the Test series 2–1.

== Test series summary ==
=== 1st Test ===
27–31 May 1998
Scorecard

New Zealand	v	Sri Lanka
305 (105.2 overs); SP Fleming 78 (180); M Muralitharan 5/90 (38.2 overs)		285 (90.2 overs); RS Kaluwitharana 72 (136); DL Vettori 3/56 (24 overs)
444/6d (123 overs); SP Fleming 174* (333); M Muralitharan 4/137 (36 overs)		297 (131.5 overs); PA de Silva 71 (155); PJ Wiseman 5/82 (46.5 overs)

New Zealand won by 167 runs
R. Premadasa Stadium, Colombo
Umpires: KT Francis (SL) and RE Koertzen (SA)
Player of the match: SP Fleming (NZ)

- New Zealand won the toss and elected to bat.
- PJ Wiseman (NZ) and HMCM Bandara and MRCN Bandaratilleke (both SL) made their Test debuts.

=== 2nd Test ===
3–7 June 1998
Scorecard

New Zealand	v	Sri Lanka
193 (101.1 overs); NJ Astle 53 (192); HDPK Dharmasena 6/72 (24.1 overs)		323 (106.4 overs); DPMD Jayawardene 167 (278); DL Vettori 4/88 (26 overs)
114 (55 overs); AC Parore 32* (86); MRCN Bandaratilleke 5/36 (24 overs)

Sri Lanka won by an innings and 16 runs
Galle International Stadium, Galle
Umpires: BC Cooray (SL) and DL Orchard (SA)
Player of the match: DPMD Jayawardene (SL)

- New Zealand won the toss and elected to bat.

=== 3rd Test ===
10–13 June 1998
Scorecard

Sri Lanka	v	New Zealand
206 (88.4 overs); MS Atapattu 48 (138); CL Cairns 5/62 (17.4 overs)		193 (86.3 overs); SP Fleming 78 (233); PA de Silva 3/30 (18.5 overs)
282 (84.5 overs); RS Kaluwitharana 88 (146); DL Vettori 6/64 (33 overs)		131 (54.3 overs); CL Cairns 26 (40); M Muralitharan 5/30 (18.3 overs)

Sri Lanka won by 164 runs
Singhalese Sports Club Cricket Ground, Colombo
Umpires: PT Manuel (SL) and VK Ramaswamy (IND)
Player of the match: RS Kaluwitharana (SL)

- Sri Lanka won the toss and elected to bat.
- The match was scheduled for five days but completed in four.
