= Australian cricket team in Sri Lanka in 1999 =

Cricket

	Sri Lanka	Australia

Test series
- Result: Sri Lanka won the 3-match series 1–0

== Tour matches ==
=== List A: Sri Lanka Board XI vs Australia XI ===
19 August
Scorecard

Sri Lanka Board XI; 208/5 (50 overs)	v	Australia; 212/5 (45.1 overs)
Sajith Fernando 67 (96); Glenn McGrath 2/17 (7 overs)		Ricky Ponting 60* (106); Russel Arnold 2/43 (8.1 overs)

Australians won by 5 wickets (with 29 balls remaining)
Sinhalese Sports Club Ground, Colombo
Umpires: TM Samarasinghe (Sri) and EKG Wijewardena (NZ)

- Sri Lanka Board XI won the toss and elected to bat

== ODI series ==
=== 1st ODI ===
22 August
Scorecard

Australia; 205/9 (43 overs)	v	Sri Lanka; 160 (37.4 overs)
Michael Bevan 43 (44); Sanath Jayasuriya 5/28 (9 overs)		Romesh Kaluwitharana 33 (46); Jason Gillespie 3/26 (6 overs)

Australia won by 50 runs (D/L method)
Galle International Stadium, Galle
Umpires: Asoka De Silva (Sri) and Peter Manuel (Sri)
Player of the match: Jason Gillespie (Aus)

- Sri Lanka won the toss and elected to field
- Rain stopped play from 11:54am to 1:20pm at the fall of Lehmann's wicket. Match reduced to 43 overs per side and the lunch break shortened to 20 minutes.
- Indika de Saram (Sri) made his ODI debut.

== Test series ==
Sri Lanka won the three-match Test series 1–0 with 2 draws. Their win in the first match was their first victory against Australia in Tests.

=== 1st Test ===
9–11 September 1999
Scorecard

Australia	v	Sri Lanka
188 (67.1 overs); RT Ponting 96 (160); M Muralitharan 4/63 (25.1 overs)		234 (66.3 overs); PA de Silva 78 (146); SK Warne 5/52 (16 overs)
140 (60.2 overs); RT Ponting 51 (118); WPUJC Vaas 3/15 (15 overs)		95/3 (26.5 overs); PA de Silva 31* (70); CR Miller 3/48 (13 overs)

Sri Lanka won by 6 wickets
Asgiriya Stadium, Kandy
Umpires: PT Manuel (SL) and S Venkataraghavan (IND)
Player of the match: PA de Silva (SL) and RT Ponting (AUS)

- Australia won the toss and elected to bat.
- The match was scheduled for five days but completed in three.

=== 2nd Test ===
22–26 September 1999
Scorecard

Sri Lanka	v	Australia
296 (106.5 overs); PA de Silva 64 (162); SK Warne 3/29 (25 overs)		228 (96.3 overs); MJ Slater 96 (220); M Muralitharan 5/71 (38 overs)
55/0 (17.2 overs); MS Atapattu 28* (61)

Match drawn
Galle International Stadium, Galle
Umpires: BC Cooray (SL) and DB Cowie (NZ)
Player of the match: MJ Slater (AUS)

- Sri Lanka won the toss and elected to bat.
- There was no play on the fourth day.
- HMRKB Herath (SL) made his Test debut.

=== 3rd Test ===
30 September–4 October 1999
Scorecard

Australia	v	Sri Lanka
342 (136.4 overs); RT Ponting 105* (171); WPUJC Vaas 4/54 (23.4 overs)		61/4 (21.5 overs); DPMD Jayawardene 21 (52); DW Fleming 3/14 (5.5 overs)

Match drawn
Singhalese Sports Club Cricket Ground, Colombo
Umpires: KT Francis (SL) and P Willey (AUS)
Player of the match: RT Ponting (AUS)

- Australia won the toss and elected to bat.
- There was no play on the final day.
