= South African cricket team in Sri Lanka in 2000 =

International cricket tour

	Sri Lanka	South Africa
- Dates: 20 July – 10 August 2000
Captains	Sanath Jayasuriya	Shaun Pollock

Test series
- Result: 3-match series drawn 1–1
Most runs	Mahela Jayawardene (321)	Lance Klusener (275)
Most wickets	Muttiah Muralitharan (26)	Shaun Pollock (11)
- Player of the series: Lance Klusener (SA)

The South African national cricket team toured Sri Lanka during the 2000 season, playing three Tests from 20 July to 10 August 2000. The Test series ended 1-1 with 1 match drawn. Shaun Pollock became 28th test captain following the sacking of Hansie Cronje.

== Tour matches ==
=== Sri Lanka Board President's XI v South Africans ===
16–27 July 2000
Scorecard

South Africans	v	Sri Lanka Board President's XI
441/7d (101.4 overs); Neil McKenzie 181 (250); Dinuka Hettiarachchi 88/3 (25.4 overs)		109 (36.2 overs); Kaushalya Weeraratne 38 (56); David Terbrugge 13/2 (6 overs)
82/3d Boeta Dippenaar 26* (63); Ruchira Perera 18/1 (4 overs)		74/0; Avishka Gunawardene 40* (42)

Match drawn
P Sara Oval, Colombo
Umpires: Daryl Harper (AUS) and Lalith Jayasundara (SL)

- Sri Lanka Board President's XI and elected to field first

=== Sri Lanka Board President's XI v South Africans ===
26–27 July 2000
Scorecard

Sri Lanka Board President's XI	v	South Africans
135; Tillakaratne Dilshan 37 (92); Nantie Hayward 32/5 (8.4 overs)		302/5d Neil McKenzie 75 (117); Dinuka Hettiarachchi 73/3 (30 overs)
141/6; Tillakaratne Dilshan 53 (83); Nicky Boje 16/2 (8 overs)

Match drawn
Tyronne Fernando Stadium, Moratuwa
Umpires: Nandasena Pathirana (SL) T. M. Samarasinghe (SL)

- Sri Lanka Board President's XI won the toss and elected to bat first

== Test series summary ==
=== 1st Test ===
20–23 July 2000
Scorecard

Sri Lanka	v	South Africa
522 (150.4 overs); Mahela Jayawardene 167 (288); Shaun Pollock 3/73 (30.4 overs)		238 (99 overs); Darryl Cullinan 114* (231); Muttiah Muralitharan 6/87 (41 overs)
		269 (f/o) (92 overs); Jonty Rhodes 63* (107); Muttiah Muralitharan 7/84 (35 overs)

Sri Lanka won by an innings and 15 runs
Galle International Stadium, Galle
Umpires: Daryl Harper (AUS) and PT Manuel (SL)
Player of the match: Muttiah Muralitharan (SL)

- Sri Lanka won the toss and elected to bat.
- The match was scheduled for five days but completed in four.
- Kumar Sangakkara (SL) and Neil McKenzie (SA) made their Test debuts. This was Sri Lanka's first test win over South Africa.

=== 2nd Test ===
30 July–2 August 2000
Scorecard

South Africa	v	Sri Lanka
253 (84.5 overs); Lance Klusener 118* (219); Kumar Dharmasena 3/58 (20 overs)		308 (99.4 overs); Marvan Atapattu 120 (292); Shaun Pollock 3/83 (24 overs)
231 (93.5 overs); Jacques Kallis 87 (208); Muttiah Muralitharan 3/76 (36 overs)		169 (50.1 overs); Arjuna Ranatunga 88 (103); Nicky Boje 3/24 (10.1 overs)

South Africa won by 7 runs
Asgiriya Stadium, Kandy
Umpires: Daryl Harper (AUS) and Gamini Silva (SL)
Player of the match: Arjuna Ranatunga (SL) and Lance Klusener (SA)

- Sri Lanka won the toss and elected to field.
- The match was scheduled for five days but completed in four.

=== 3rd Test ===
6–10 August 2000
Scorecard

South Africa	v	Sri Lanka
279 (108.2 overs); Lance Klusener 95* (175); Chaminda Vaas 4/85 (36 overs)		258 (98.2 overs); Sanath Jayasuriya 85 (113); Nicky Boje 5/62 (34 overs)
241/9d (113.5 overs); Jonty Rhodes 54 (151); Muttiah Muralitharan 5/68 (45.5 overs)		195/4 (67.1 overs); Mahela Jayawardene 101* (183); Shaun Pollock 1/13 (6 overs)

Match drawn
Singhalese Sports Club Cricket Ground, Colombo
Umpires: BC Cooray (SL) and Eddie Nicholls (WI)
Player of the match: Muttiah Muralitharan (SL)

- Sri Lanka won the toss and elected to field.
- This was Arjuna Ranatunga's Last international match
