= Bangladeshi cricket team in Sri Lanka in 2002 =

| | Sri Lanka | Bangladesh |
- Dates: 21 July – 7 Aug
| Captains | Sanath Jayasuriya | Khaled Mashud |

Test series
- Result: Sri Lanka won the 2-match series 2–0
| Most runs | Sanath Jayasuriya (230) | Al Sahariar (98) |
| Most wickets | Muttiah Muralitharan (10) | Manjural Islam (5); Talha Jubair (5) |

One Day International series
- Results: Sri Lanka won the 3-match series 3–0
| Most runs | Marvan Atapattu (134) | Khaled Mashud (106) |
| Most wickets | Muttiah Muralitharan (6) | Khaled Mahmud (5) |
- Player of the series: Khaled Mashud

Bangladesh made its first Test tour of Sri Lanka in July–August 2002, playing 2 Tests and 3 One Day Internationals (ODIs). Sri Lanka won all five matches to whitewash Bangladesh in both the Test and the ODI series. Sri Lanka was captained by Sanath Jayasuriya and Bangladesh was captained by Khaled Mashud in both the formats.

== Test series ==
=== 1st Test ===
21–23 July 2002
Scorecard

| Bangladesh | v | Sri Lanka |
| 161 (53.4 overs); Hannan Sarkar 55 (69); Muttiah Muralitharan 5/39 (19.4 overs) | | 541/9d (111 overs); Aravinda de Silva 206 (234); Enamul Haque 4/144 (38 overs) |
| 184 (66.3 overs); Al Sahariar 67 (123); Muttiah Muralitharan 5/59 (25 overs) |

Sri Lanka won by an innings and 196 runs
Paikiasothy Saravanamuttu Stadium, Colombo
Umpires: Billy Doctrove (WI) and David Shepherd (Eng)
Player of the match: Muttiah Muralitharan

- Sri Lanka won the toss and elected to field.

=== 2nd Test ===
28–31 July 2002
Scorecard

| Sri Lanka | v | Bangladesh |
| 373 (106.4 overs); Michael Vandort 61 (110); Manjural Islam 3/46 (23 overs) | | 164 (62 overs); Tapash Baisya 52* (103); Sanath Jayasuriya 3/17 (7 overs) |
| 263/2d (66 overs); Michael Vandort 140 (185); Talha Jubair 1/52 (14 overs) | | 184 (60.4 overs); Mohammad Ashraful 75 (120); Sujeewa de Silva 4/35 (13 overs) |

Sri Lanka won by 288 runs
Sinhalese Sports Club Ground, Colombo
Umpires: Steve Bucknor (WI) and David Shepherd (Eng)
Player of the match: Michael Vandort

- Bangladesh won the toss and elected to field.
- Sri Lanka won the 2-match series 2-0

== ODI series ==
=== 1st ODI ===
4 August
(scorecard)

| Bangladesh; 226/8 (50 overs) | v | Sri Lanka; 228/5 (44.4 overs) |
| Tushar Imran 61 (85); Dilhara Fernando 2/33 (10 overs) | | Marvan Atapattu 83 (101); Khaled Mahmud 2/41 (10 overs) |

Sri Lanka won by 5 wickets (with 32 balls remaining)
Sinhalese Sports Club Ground, Colombo
Umpires: Steve Bucknor (WI) & Asoka de Silva (SRI)
Player of the match: Marvan Atapattu

- Bangladesh won the toss and elected to bat.

=== 2nd ODI ===
5 August
(scorecard)

| Bangladesh; 76 (30.1 overs) | v | Sri Lanka; 77/2 (15.4 overs) |
| Khaled Mashud 15 (46); Upul Chandana 3/2 (3.1 overs) | | Marvan Atapattu 31 (40); Mohammad Rafique 1/16 (3 overs) |

Sri Lanka won by 8 wickets (with 206 balls remaining)
Sinhalese Sports Club Ground, Colombo
Umpires: Steve Bucknor (WI) & Tyron Wijewardene (SRI)
Player of the match: Dilhara Fernando

- Bangladesh won the toss and elected to bat.
- Bangladesh's score of 76 was their lowest ODI score ever.

=== 3rd ODI ===
7 August
(scorecard)

| Sri Lanka; 258/6 (50 overs) | v | Bangladesh; 200 (47.2 overs) |
| Russel Arnold 62 (64); Khaled Mahmud 3/51 (10 overs) | | Habibul Bashar 52 (98); Muttiah Muralitharan 3/24 (10 overs) |

Sri Lanka won by 58 runs
R. Premadasa Stadium, Colombo
Umpires: Steve Bucknor (WI) & Peter Manuel (SRI)
Player of the match: Russel Arnold

- Bangladesh won the toss and elected to field.
- Sri Lanka won the 3-match ODI series 3-0.

== Records and statistics ==
=== Batting ===
Test
| Player | Nat | Matches | Innings | Runs | NO | Ave. | SR | HS | 100 | 50 | 4s | 6s |
|---|---|---|---|---|---|---|---|---|---|---|---|---|
| Sanath Jayasuriya | (Sri Lanka) | 2 | 2 | 230 | 0 | 115.00 | 89.14 | 145 | 1 | 1 | 22 | 7 |
| Aravinda de Silva | (Sri Lanka) | 1 | 1 | 206 | 0 | 206.00 | 88.03 | 206 | 1 | 0 | 28 | 1 |
| Michael Vandort | (Sri Lanka) | 1 | 2 | 201 | 0 | 100.50 | 68.13 | 140 | 1 | 1 | 26 | 1 |
| Naveed Nawaz | (Sri Lanka) | 1 | 2 | 99 | 1 | 99.00 | 51.56 | 78* | 0 | 1 | 11 | 0 |
| Al Sahariar | (Bangladesh) | 2 | 4 | 98 | 0 | 24.50 | 52.12 | 67 | 0 | 1 | 18 | 0 |
ODI
| Player | Nat | Matches | Innings | Runs | NO | Ave. | SR | HS | 100 | 50 | 4s | 6s |
| Marvan Atapattu | (Sri Lanka) | 3 | 3 | 134 | 1 | 67.00 | 79.76 | 83 | 0 | 1 | 17 | 1 |
| Khaled Mashud | (Bangladesh) | 3 | 3 | 106 | 0 | 35.33 | 56.08 | 54 | 0 | 1 | 8 | 1 |
| Russel Arnold | (Sri Lanka) | 3 | 2 | 91 | 1 | 91.00 | 75.20 | 62 | 0 | 1 | 6 | 2 |
| Tushar Imran | (Bangladesh) | 3 | 3 | 71 | 0 | 23.66 | 64.54 | 61 | 0 | 1 | 8 | 1 |
| Habibul Bashar | (Bangladesh) | 3 | 3 | 64 | 0 | 21.33 | 45.71 | 52 | 0 | 1 | 4 | 0 |
Source: Cricinfo

=== Bowling ===
Test
| Player | Nat | Matches | Innings | Wickets | Overs | Runs | Econ. | Ave. | BBI | 5WI | 10WI |
|---|---|---|---|---|---|---|---|---|---|---|---|
| Muthiah Muralidaran | (Sri Lanka) | 1 | 2 | 10 | 44.4 | 98 | 2.19 | 9.8 | 5/39 | 2 | 1 |
| Sujeewa de Silva | (Sri Lanka) | 2 | 4 | 7 | 48.0 | 146 | 3.04 | 20.85 | 4/35 | 0 | 0 |
| Thilan Samaraweera | (Sri Lanka) | 1 | 2 | 6 | 23.4 | 67 | 2.82 | 11.16 | 4/49 | 0 | 0 |
| Manjurul Islam | (Bangladesh) | 2 | 3 | 5 | 57.0 | 202 | 3.54 | 40.40 | 3/46 | 0 | 0 |
| Talha Jubair | (Bangladesh) | 2 | 3 | 5 | 56.4 | 246 | 4.34 | 49.20 | 2/74 | 0 | 0 |
ODI
| Player | Nat | Matches | Innings | Wickets | Overs | Runs | Econ. | Ave. | BBI | 4WI | 5WI |
| Muthiah Muralidaran | (Sri Lanka) | 3 | 3 | 6 | 28.2 | 87 | 3.07 | 14.50 | 3/24 | 0 | 0 |
| Hasantha Fernando | (Sri Lanka) | 3 | 3 | 5 | 19.0 | 54 | 2.84 | 10.80 | 3/12 | 0 | 0 |
| Khaled Mahmud | (Bangladesh) | 3 | 2 | 5 | 20.0 | 92 | 4.60 | 18.40 | 3/51 | 0 | 0 |
| Upul Chandana | (Sri Lanka) | 2 | 2 | 4 | 12.1 | 47 | 3.86 | 11.75 | 3/2 | 0 | 0 |
| Dilhara Fernando | (Sri Lanka) | 2 | 2 | 4 | 16.0 | 54 | 3.37 | 13.50 | 2/21 | 0 | 0 |
Source: Cricinfo
