= Zimbabwean cricket team in Sri Lanka in 1996–97 =

International cricket tour

	Sri Lanka	Zimbabwe
- Dates: 11 – 21 September 1997
Captains	Arjuna Ranatunga	Alistair Campbell

Test series
- Result: Sri Lanka won the 2-match series 2–0
Most runs	Hashan Tillakaratne (146)	Grant Flower (92)
Most wickets	Muttiah Muralitharan (14)	Paul Strang (9)

The Zimbabwe cricket team made their first tour of Sri Lanka in September 1996, playing two Test Matches. Sri Lanka won the Test series 2-0:

- 1st Test @ R Premadasa Stadium, Colombo – Sri Lanka won by an innings and 77 runs
- 2nd Test @ Sinhalese Sports Club Ground, Colombo – Sri Lanka won by 10 wickets

== Test series ==
=== 1st Test ===
11–14 September
Scorecard

Sri Lanka	v	Zimbabwe
349 (106.3 overs); Arjuna Ranatunga 75 (192); Paul Strang 5/106 (34.3 overs)		145 (72.4 overs); Craig Wishart 51 (205); Chaminda Vaas 4/73 (22 overs)
		127 (73.3 overs); Grant Flower 27 (112); Muttiah Muralitharan 5/33 (20.3 overs)

Sri Lanka won by an innings and 77 runs
R Premadasa Stadium, Colombo
Umpires: Steve Bucknor (WI) and B. C. Cooray (SL)
Player of the match: Arjuna Ranatunga (SL)

- Sri Lanka won the toss and elected to bat.
- Craig Evans and Guy Whittall (Zim) made their Test debuts.

=== 2nd Test ===
18–21 September
Scorecard

Zimbabwe	v	Sri Lanka
141 (53.1 overs); Grant Flower 52 (180); Jayantha Silva 4/16 (10.1 overs)		350/8d (133.5 overs); Hashan Tillakaratne 126* (326); Paul Strang 4/66 (38 overs)
235 (113.3 overs); Ali Shah 62 (268); Muttiah Muralitharan 3/94 (41 overs)		30/0 (6.4 overs); Sanath Jayasuriya 18*; Paul Strang 0/13 (3 overs)

Sri Lanka won by 10 wickets
Sinhalese Sports Club Ground, Colombo
Umpires: K. T. Francis (SL) and Cyril Mitchley (SA)
Player of the match: Hashan Tillakaratne (SL)

- Zimbabwe won the toss and chose to bat.
- This was Asanka Gurusinha's Last test match
