= Sri Lankan cricket team in Pakistan in 1999–2000 =

The Sri Lankan national cricket team visited Pakistan in February to March 2000 and played a three-match Test series against the Pakistani national cricket team. Sri Lanka won the Test series 2–1. Sri Lanka were captained by Sanath Jayasuriya and Pakistan by Saeed Anwar or Moin Khan. In addition, the teams played a three-match Limited Overs International (LOI) series which Sri Lanka won 3–0.

== ODI series ==
=== 1st ODI ===
13 February 2000
Scorecard

| Sri Lanka; 274/8 (50 overs) | v | Pakistan; 245 (48 overs) |
| MS Atapattu 119* (135); Shahid Nazir 3/58 (10 overs) | | Aamer Sohail 47 (66); M Muralitharan 3/31 (10 overs) |

Sri Lanka won by 29 runs
National Stadium, Karachi
Umpires: Sadiq Mohammad and Saleem Badar
Player of the match: MS Atapattu (SL)

- Pakistan won the toss and elected to field.
- Imran Abbas, Yasir Arafat and Younis Khan (all PAK) made their ODI debuts.

=== 2nd ODI ===
16 February 2000
Scorecard

| Sri Lanka; 263/6 (50 overs) | v | Pakistan; 229 (45.1 overs) |
| Sanath Jayasuriya 65 (78); Saqlain Mushtaq 2/48 (10 overs) | | Mohammad Yousuf 68 (87); Sanath Jayasuriya 2/30 (7 overs) |

Sri Lanka won by 34 runs
Jinnah Stadium, Gujranwala
Umpires: Aleem Dar and Asad Rauf
Player of the match: Sanath Jayasuriya (SL)

- Pakistan won the toss and elected to field.
- Pakistan innings limited to 49 overs due to their slow over rate.

=== 3rd ODI ===
19 February 2000
Scorecard

| Sri Lanka; 241/9 (50 overs) | v | Pakistan; 137 (39.3 overs) |
| Marvan Atapattu 77 (91); Abdur Razzaq 4/36 (10 overs) | | Saeed Anwar 30 (45); ST Jayasuriya 2/27 (7.3 overs) |

Sri Lanka won by 104 runs
Gaddafi Stadium, Lahore
Umpires: Mian Mohammad Aslam and Nadeem Ghauri
Player of the match: Marvan Atapattu (SL)

- Pakistan won the toss and elected to field.
- Faisal Iqbal (PAK) made his ODI debut.

== Test series summary ==
=== 1st Test ===
26 February–1 March 2000
(5-day match)

| Pakistan | v | Sri Lanka |
| 182 (73.5 overs); Inzamam-ul-Haq 44 (96); GP Wickramasinghe 4/37 (20 overs) | | 353 (123.2 overs); Aravinda de Silva 112 (276); Waqar Younis 4/103 (30 overs) |
| 390 (152.1 overs); Younis Khan 107 (250); Muttiah Muralitharan 4/127 (54.1 overs) | | 220/8 (83.5 overs); Sanath Jayasuriya 56 (105); Abdur Razzaq 4/56 (26 overs) |

Sri Lanka won by 2 wickets
Rawalpindi Cricket Stadium, Rawalpindi
Umpires: Athar Zaidi (PAK) and DL Orchard (SA)
Player of the match: Aravinda de Silva (SL)

- Sri Lanka won the toss and elected to field.
- Younis Khan (PAK) made his Test debut.

=== 2nd Test ===
5–9 March 2000
(5-day match)

| Sri Lanka | v | Pakistan |
| 268 (109.3 overs); MS Atapattu 75 (176); Shoaib Akhtar 5/75 (24.3 overs) | | 199 (88.5 overs); Saeed Anwar 74 (191); Muttiah Muralitharan 4/77 (39 overs) |
| 224 (73.2 overs); Russel Arnold 99 (192); Waqar Younis 3/38 (16 overs) | | 236 (70.1 overs); Mohammad Yousuf 88 (131); Muttiah Muralitharan 6/71 (27.1 overs) |

Sri Lanka won by 57 runs
Arbab Niaz Stadium, Peshawar
Umpires: JH Hampshire (ENG) and Mohammad Nazir (PAK)
Player of the match: Muttiah Muralitharan (SL)

- Pakistan won the toss and elected to field.
- Atiq-uz-Zaman (PAK) made his Test debut.

=== 3rd Test ===
12–15 March 2000
(5-day match)

| Pakistan | v | Sri Lanka |
| 256 (85.5 overs); Inzamam-ul-Haq 86 (163); Muttiah Muralitharan 4/89 (32 overs) | | 227 (58.1 overs); Russel Arnold 48 (61); Shoaib Akhtar 3/52 (18 overs) |
| 421 (133.5 overs); Inzamam-ul-Haq 138 (243); Ravindra Pushpakumara 4/66 (20.5 overs) | | 228 (46 overs); Ravindra Pushpakumara 44 (45); Shahid Afridi 3/50 (8 overs) |

Pakistan won by 222 runs
National Stadium, Karachi
Umpires: Riazuddin (PAK) and Russell Tiffin (ZIM)
Player of the match: Inzamam-ul-Haq (PAK)

- Sri Lanka won the toss and elected to field.
- The match was scheduled for five days but completed in four.
- Irfan Fazil (PAK) made his Test debut.
