= Nelson Gooneratne =

Sri Lankan cricket umpire (born 1934)

Personal information
- Full name: Madurugodaarchchige Don Dayananda Nelson Gooneratne
- Born: 28 October 1934 (age 92); Ratnapura, Sri Lanka

Umpiring information
- Tests umpired: 1 (1985)
- Source: Cricinfo, 6 July 2013

Nelson Gooneratne (born 28 October 1934) is a former Sri Lankan cricket umpire. He stood in one Test match, Sri Lanka vs. India, in 1985.

== See also ==
- List of Test cricket umpires
- Indian cricket team in Sri Lanka in 1985
