= Sri Lankan cricket team in Pakistan in 1995–96 =

International cricket tour

The Sri Lanka national cricket team toured Pakistan from August to October 1995 and played a three-match Test series against the Pakistan national cricket team. Sri Lanka won the Test series 2–1. Sri Lanka were captained by Arjuna Ranatunga and Pakistan by Rameez Raja. In addition, the teams played a three-match One Day International (ODI) series, which Sri Lanka won 2–1. Sri Lanka won both series having lost the first match in each.

== Test series summary ==
=== 1st Test ===
8–11 September 1995
(5-day match)
Scorecard

Pakistan	v	Sri Lanka
459/9d (149 overs); Inzamam-ul-Haq 95 (216); WPUJC Vaas 5/99 (29 overs)		186 (62.1 overs); HP Tillakaratne 44* (109); Wasim Akram 5/55 (20 overs)
		233 (f/o) (80 overs); A Ranatunga 76 (91); Aamer Sohail 4/54 (21 overs)

Pakistan won by an innings and 40 runs
Arbab Niaz Stadium, Peshawar
Umpires: BL Aldridge (NZ) and Mahboob Shah (PAK)
Player of the match: Wasim Akram (PAK)

- Pakistan won the toss and elected to bat.
- The match was scheduled for five days but completed in four.
- Ijaz Ahmed jnr and Saqlain Mushtaq (both PAK) made their Test debuts.

=== 2nd Test ===
15–19 September 1995
(5-day match)
Scorecard

Sri Lanka	v	Pakistan
223 (70 overs); HP Tillakaratne 115 (176); Aaqib Javed 3/34 (13 overs)		333 (118 overs); Rameez Raja 75 (141); M Muralitharan 5/68 (23.3 overs)
361 (146.3 overs); PA de Silva 105 (316); Aaqib Javed 5/84 (32.3 overs)		209 (72.1 overs); Saeed Anwar 50 (121); Moin Khan 50 (90); WPUJC Vaas 4/45 (15 overs)

Sri Lanka won by 42 runs
Iqbal Stadium, Faisalabad
Umpires: Khizer Hayat (PAK) and NT Plews (ENG)
Player of the match: M Muralitharan (SL)

- Pakistan won the toss and elected to field.
- Mohammad Akram (PAK) made his Test debut.

=== 3rd Test ===
22–26 September 1995
(5-day match)
Scorecard

Sri Lanka	v	Pakistan
232 (92.3 overs); HDPK Dharmasena 62* (133); Aaqib Javed 3/47 (19.3 overs)		214 (83.1 overs); Aamer Sohail 48 (79); M Muralitharan 4/72 (27.1 overs)
338/9d (120.3 overs); A Ranatunga 87 (184); Mohammad Akram 3/39 (20 overs)		212 (76 overs); Moin Khan 117* (208); WPUJC Vaas 4/37 (24 overs)

Sri Lanka won by 144 runs
Jinnah Stadium, Sialkot
Umpires: BL Aldridge (NZ) and Shakeel Khan (PAK)
Player of the match: A Ranatunga (SL)

- Sri Lanka won the toss and elected to bat.

== ODI series ==
=== 1st ODI ===
29 September 1995
Scorecard

Sri Lanka; 233/5 (50 overs)	v	Pakistan; 234/1 (44 overs)
A Ranatunga 102* (114); Ata-ur-Rehman 2/46 (10 overs)		Saleem Elahi 102* (133); ST Jayasuriya 1/43 (10 overs)

Pakistan won by 9 wickets
Municipal Stadium, Gujranwala
Umpires: Ikram Rabbani and Mian Mohammad Aslam
Player of the match: Saleem Elahi (PAK)

- Pakistan won the toss and elected to field.
- Mohammad Akram, Saleem Elahi and Saqlain Mushtaq (all PAK) made their ODI debuts.

=== 2nd ODI ===
1 October 1995
Scorecard

Sri Lanka; 257/7 (50 overs)	v	Pakistan; 208/8 (50 overs)
AP Gurusinha 66 (73); Ata-ur-Rehman 2/46 (10 overs)		Saleem Elahi 47 (61); PA de Silva 2/33 (10 overs)

Sri Lanka won by 49 runs
Iqbal Stadium, Faisalabad
Umpires: Saleem Badar and Siddiq Khan
Player of the match: ST Jayasuriya (SL)

- Pakistan won the toss and elected to field.

=== 3rd ODI ===
3 October 1995
Scorecard

Pakistan; 183/9 (38 overs)	v	Sri Lanka; 184/6 (37.4 overs)
Aamer Hanif 36* (44); HDPK Dharmasena 3/30 (8 overs)		A Ranatunga 42 (53); Aamer Hanif 3/36 (6 overs)

Sri Lanka won by 4 wickets
Rawalpindi Cricket Stadium, Rawalpindi
Umpires: Islam Khan and Shakeel Khan
Player of the match: A Ranatunga (SL)

- Sri Lanka won the toss and elected to field.
- The match was reduced before play started to 38 overs per side.
- Saeed Azad (PAK) and KEA Upashantha (SL) made their ODI debuts.
