= K. T. Ponnambalam =

Sri Lankan cricket umpire

Personal information
- Full name: K. T. Ponnambalam

Umpiring information
- ODIs umpired: 2 (1985–1986)
- Source: Cricinfo, 26 May 2014

K. T. Ponnambalam is a Sri Lankan former cricket umpire. He stood in two ODI games in 1985 and 1986.

== See also ==
- List of One Day International cricket umpires
