= Amal Silva =

Sri Lankan cricketer (born 1960)

Personal information
- Full name: Sampathwaduge Amal Rohitha Silva
- Born: 12 December 1960 (age 65); Moratuwa
- Batting: Left-handed
- Bowling: Right-arm offbreak

International information
- National side: Sri Lanka (1983–1988)
- Test debut (cap 23): 11 March 1983 v New Zealand
- Last Test: 25 August 1988 v England
- ODI debut (cap 39): 3 November 1984 v New Zealand
- Last ODI: 25 October 1985 v Pakistan

Career statistics
Competition	Test	ODI
Matches	9	20
Runs scored	353	441
Batting average	25.21	22.05
100s/50s	2/0	0/3
Top score	111	85
Catches/stumpings	33/1	17/3
- Source: Cricinfo, 9 February 2016

Sampathwaduge Amal Rohitha Silva (born 12 December 1960) is a former Sri Lankan cricketer who played in nine Test matches and 20 One Day Internationals from 1983 to 1988. He was a left-handed wicketkeeper batsman and opened the batting for Sri Lanka.

== School times ==
Silva is a past student of Prince of Wales' College, Moratuwa and St Peter's College, Colombo.

== International career ==
From when he made his Test debut against New Zealand, Silva was in a battle with Guy de Alwis for first choice gloveman. Due to an injury to de Alwis in 1984, Silva toured England with Sri Lanka aiming to cement his spot in the side. In the Lord's Test he opened the batting and made an unbeaten 102 in the second innings. He was rewarded by being included in their next Test series, against India. After taking 9 catches in the first Test he took another 8 in the second, as well as making a career best 111. He finished the series with 22 dismissals, a Sri Lankan record.
