= Selliah Ponnadurai =

Sri Lankan cricket umpire (1935–2013)

Personal information
- Born: 25 April 1935; Jaffna, Sri Lanka
- Died: 15 August 2013 (aged 78)

Umpiring information
- Tests umpired: 3 (1985–1993)
- ODIs umpired: 8 (1983–1993)
- Source: Cricinfo, 14 July 2013

Selliah Ponnadurai (25 April 1935 – 15 August 2013) was a Sri Lankan cricket umpire. He stood in three Test matches between 1985 and 1993 and eight One Day Internationals between 1983 and 1993. He died in 2013 at the age of 78.

== See also ==
- List of Test cricket umpires
- List of One Day International cricket umpires
