= Jayananda Warnaweera =

Sri Lankan cricketer (1960–2025)

Personal information
- Full name: Kahakatchchi Patabandige Jayananda Warnaweera
- Born: 23 November 1960; Matara, Ceylon
- Died: 16 October 2025 (aged 64)
- Batting: Left-handed
- Bowling: Right-arm medium; Right-arm offbreak

International information
- National side: Sri Lanka (1986–1994)
- Test debut (cap 33): 23 February 1986 v Pakistan
- Last Test: 9 August 1994 v Pakistan
- ODI debut (cap 62): 8 December 1990 v India
- Last ODI: 4 February 1993 v Pakistan

Career statistics
Competition	Test	ODI	FC
Matches	10	6	68
Runs scored	39	1	265
Batting average	4.33	–	6.16
100s/50s	0/0	0/0	0/0
Top score	20	1*	24*
Balls bowled	2,333	294	12,953
Wickets	32	6	287
Bowling average	31.90	33.33	19.96
5 wickets in innings	0	0	22
10 wickets in match	0	0	6
Best bowling	4/25	2/24	7/16
Catches/stumpings	0/–	2/–	10/–
- Source: Cricinfo, 18 October 2025

Kahakatchchi Patabandige Jayananda Warnaweera (23 November 1960 – 16 October 2025) was a Sri Lankan cricketer who played in 10 Test matches and six One Day Internationals from 1986 to 1994.

== Cricket career ==
Warnaweera made his international debut in Pakistan's 1986 tour of Sri Lanka, playing in the first test at Kandy. An injury hampered his bowling, but he managed to take his first wicket in test cricket in Ramiz Raja, as he finished with 1/26 in Pakistan's sole innings. After his debut, Warnaweera would not return to the Sri Lankan team until 1990. In an excellent first class season in the Lakspray Trophy, he took 71 wickets, 28 more than any other bowler, at an average of just 13.47. He took 13/147 in a match against Burgher Recreation Club, and 7/16 in the second innings of a match against Air Force, contributing to his selection for the Sri Lankan team that travelled to India. In the only test, he bowled a marathon 46 overs in India's only innings, taking 3/90, including opener Ravi Shastri and Indian great Kapil Dev. Warnaweera made his ODI debut on the same tour, again taking the wicket of Dev, although he would play two further ODI's against Pakistan in the 1990–91 Sharjah Cup and India in the 1990–91 Asia Cup respectively, he would not play another ODI until 1993, where figures of 0/39 against Pakistan ended his ODI career.

Warnaweera was kept in the team for the 1990/91 tour of New Zealand, but was unsuccessful, finishing with match figures of 0/89 in the 1st test, and did not play in the remaining two tests. He was recalled to the team later that year, playing both test matches in New Zealand's tour of Sri Lanka, and was the series' leading wicket taker, with 9 at an average of 23.22 each. Although he was accused of throwing by New Zealand's captain Martin Crowe. Warnaweera took 8 wickets in England's sole test in Sri Lanka in March 1993, playing a significant role in Sri Lanka's victory, although he was again suspected of throwing, with non-playing English all rounder Dermot Reeve recording footage from the boundary due to doubts of his action's legality. Warnaweera would return to the test team for three matches against India in 1993. After the first test was washed out, he took 6/248 in the other two matches, also achieving his test high score of 20 in the second test in Colombo. His final international appearance came in August 1994, against Pakistan, where he took 3 wickets in the first innings, and two more in the second innings.

== Retirement and death ==
After his retirement, Warnaweera served as the chief curator of the Galle International Cricket Stadium, helping it to host its inaugural Test in 1998, as well as become an effective fortress for the Sri Lankan team, with the heavy spin the ground provided under his curation. The Boxing Day Tsunami of 2004 destroyed the ground and he worked tirelessly to rebuild it, with cricketing greats such as Shane Warne donating to the reconstruction. His work at the stadium was considered groundbreaking, installing full field covers for rain delays, an innovation soon copied elsewhere. As well as installing new dressing rooms, media rooms and hospitality boxes to improve the ground.

Warnaweera was also a controversial and powerful figure in Sri Lankan cricket, being described as a "kingmaker" for his influence on the executive committee. His political nous was shown when after the Archaeological Department complained about a new grandstand blocking views of the Galle Fort, he renamed the grandstand after Sri Lankan President Mahinda Rajapaksa. The complaints were soon withdrawn. In 2016 however, his influence came to a halt as he was suspended for three years by the ICC for failing to cooperate with the Anti-Corruption Unit (ACU) in an investigation.

Warnaweera retired from public life after his ban was handed down, and he died on 16 October 2025, at the age of 64.
