= Peter Manuel (umpire) =

Sri Lankan cricket umpire (born 1950)

Personal information
- Full name: Peter Tyronne Manuel
- Born: 18 November 1950 (age 75); Kandy, Sri Lanka

Umpiring information
- Tests umpired: 11 (1993–2001)
- ODIs umpired: 45 (1992–2004)
- Source: Cricinfo, 11 July 2013

Peter Manuel (born 18 November 1950) is a Sri Lankan former cricket umpire. He stood in eleven Test matches between 1993 and 2001 and 45 ODI games between 1992 and 2004. He coaches cricket umpires for the ICC.

== See also ==
- List of Test cricket umpires
- List of One Day International cricket umpires
