= B. C. Cooray =

Sri Lankan cricket umpire

Bulathsinghalage Cyril Cooray (born 15 May 1941 in Colombo), is a former Sri Lankan international cricket umpire and a former senior executive of Sri Lanka Insurance Corporation. He officiated in 21 Test matches and 48 ODIs over a period of 26 years. He also served on the ICC International Panel for Umpires. His umpiring mistakes during Sri Lanka's home Test series against England in 2001 caused a major controversy.

== Career ==
He was employed at the Sri Lanka Insurance Corporation before pursuing a full time umpiring career. He made his international debut as an umpire on 21 September 1985 during an ODI between Sri Lanka and India.

=== 2001 Sri Lanka-England Test series ===
Cooray and South Africa's Rudi Koertzen were appointed as standing umpires for the second Test match between Sri Lanka and England in 2001 at Asgiriya Stadium, Kandy. The match witnessed at least 13 umpiring mistakes, with Cooray playing a major part. England went on to win the match by three wickets. Fans chanted and booed the umpires in the stands for their erroneous calls, leading to the umpires being escorted from the stadium by security officials. Local Sri Lankan fans vented their frustrations in the stands by holding placards and banners, such as "B.C You Sold This Match. Have Got Your Resident Visa for England" and "Bad Call Cooray".

During England's first innings, Cooray turned down three close lbw appeals when England skipper Nasser Hussain was batting; Hussain went on to complete a match-winning century. Cooray also denied a caught and bowled dismissal of Graeme Hick off Muttiah Muralitharan's bowling, and denied another close lbw call when Michael Atherton was batting. During Sri Lanka's second innings, Cooray ruled Sanath Jayasuriya out, when replays suggested that the ball had bumped well before it was taken by slip fielder Graham Thorpe. Jayasuriya showed dissent at the decision as he hurled his helmet across the boundary line. The contentious umpiring decisions caused tensions between the two teams, with Atherton claiming that Kumar Sangakkara called the England team "cheats".

Cooray also faced backlash for his refusal to admit the mistakes he committed during the match. During the post-match presentation, fans of Sri Lanka and England yelled for him to be named Man of the Match. Initial reports by local media revealed that he would be dropped for the third and final Test of the series, thus forcing him to retire from umpiring. Later it was reported that he was recalled as TV umpire for the third and final Test, which was confirmed by K. T. Francis, the director of umpiring with the Sri Lanka Cricket. Despite the assurance from Francis, the second Test at Kandy turned out to be Cooray's last international match as an umpire.

Prior to the controversial Test match, Cooray was generally regarded as a competent umpire and was well respected within the cricketing community and among fans.

== See also ==
- List of Test cricket umpires
- List of One Day International cricket umpires
