= K. T. Francis =

Sri Lankan cricket umpire (1939–2013)

Personal information
- Full name: Kandiah Thirugnansampandapillai Francis
- Born: 15 October 1939; Kegalle, Ceylon
- Died: 9 June 2013 (aged 74); Colombo, Sri Lanka
- Role: Umpire

Umpiring information
- Tests umpired: 25 (1982–1999)
- ODIs umpired: 56 (1982–1999)
- FC umpired: 108 (1981–1999)
- LA umpired: 72 (1981–1999)
- Source: CricketArchive, 10 June 2013

Kandiah Thirugnansampandapillai Francis (Tamil: காந்தையா ஶ்ரீஜ்ஞாநஸம்பந்தபிள்ளை ஃபிராஞ்ஸிஸ்; 15 October 1939 – 9 June 2013) was a Sri Lankan cricket umpire. Francis officiated in 25 Tests and 56 One Day Internationals (ODIs) between 1982 and 1999, mostly in his native Sri Lanka.

Francis' first Test as umpire was the one-off Test between Sri Lanka and England in February 1982; this was the first recognised Test match played by Sri Lanka. Three days earlier, Francis made his debut as an ODI umpire, in a match that also featured the debut of future Sri Lankan cricket captain Arjuna Ranatunga.

Francis was married and had two children.

== See also ==
- List of Test cricket umpires
- List of One Day International cricket umpires
