= Aravinda de Silva =

Sri Lankan cricketer

Deshabandu Aravinda de Silva
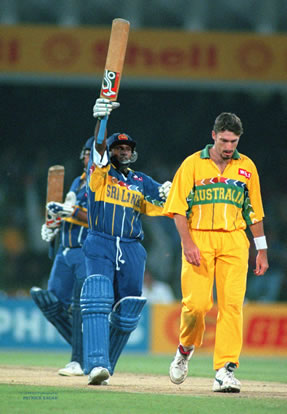
- Aravinda de Silva (left) raises his bat after scoring a century in 1996 ICC Cricket World Cup Final

Personal information
- Full name: Pinnaduwage Aravinda de Silva
- Born: 17 October 1965 (age 61); Colombo, Ceylon
- Nickname: Mad Max
- Height: 5 ft 3.5 in (161 cm)
- Batting: Right-handed
- Bowling: Right-arm off break
- Role: Batting All-Rounder

International information
- National side: Sri Lanka (1984–2003)
- Test debut (cap 27): 23 August 1984 v England
- Last Test: 23 July 2002 v Bangladesh
- ODI debut (cap 37): 31 March 1984 v New Zealand
- Last ODI: 18 March 2003 v Australia

Domestic team information
- Years: Team
- 1989–2002: Nondescripts Cricket Club
- 1995: Kent
- 1996/97: Auckland

Career statistics
| Competition | Test | ODI | FC | LA |
|---|---|---|---|---|
| Matches | 93 | 308 | 220 | 392 |
| Runs scored | 6,361 | 9,284 | 15,000 | 12,095 |
| Batting average | 42.97 | 34.90 | 48.38 | 36.32 |
| 100s/50s | 20/22 | 11/64 | 43/71 | 17/77 |
| Top score | 267 | 145 | 267 | 158* |
| Balls bowled | 2,595 | 5,148 | 9,005 | 7,377 |
| Wickets | 29 | 106 | 129 | 156 |
| Bowling average | 41.65 | 39.40 | 29.17 | 36.30 |
| 5 wickets in innings | 0 | 0 | 8 | 0 |
| 10 wickets in match | 0 | 0 | 1 | 0 |
| Best bowling | 3/30 | 4/30 | 7/24 | 4/28 |
| Catches/stumpings | 43/– | 95/– | 108/– | 116/– |
Medal record
Men's Cricket
Representing Sri Lanka
ICC Cricket World Cup
| Winner | 1996 India-Pakistan-Sri Lanka |
ICC Champions Trophy
| Winner | 2002 Sri Lanka |
- Source: Cricinfo, 25 August 2007

Deshabandu Pinnaduwage Aravinda de Silva (Sinhala: අරවින්ද ද සිල්වා,Tamil: அரவிந்த டி சில்வா ; born 17 October 1965) is a former Sri Lankan cricketer. Regarded as one of Sri Lanka's greatest ever cricketers, De Silva was a key member of the Sri Lankan team that won the 1996 Cricket World Cup, where he scored a match winning century in the final, bringing Sri Lanka from underdog status to present-day form. During the twilight of his career, De Silva was part of the team which finished as joint-winners alongside India at the 2002 ICC Champions Trophy. He has held various posts in Sri Lankan Cricket since his retirement in 2003. He was inducted into ICC Cricket Hall of Fame in 2023.

Aravinda is the only player to make a hundred and take three or more wickets in a World cup final. He is the first man to score two unbeaten hundreds in a Test, where he scored unbeaten 138 and 103 against Pakistan in 1997.

Following his illustrious cricket career, de Silva came under fire with several accusations of match fixing, along with Arjuna Ranatunga, which he vehemently denied.

== Education ==
De Silva had his initial education at D. S. Senanayake College, Colombo. and Isipathana College Colombo

== Domestic career ==
A successful season playing first-class cricket for the English county Kent in 1995 marked a turning point in his career.

=== County cricket with Kent ===
Following the Sri Lankan tour of New Zealand de Silva joined the English county team Kent in April 1995 on short notice after Kent's leading batsman of the previous season, Carl Hooper, left to join the West Indies team for the summer. The season proved to be a mix of disappointment and success for Kent, as they finished last (18th) in County Championship with only three wins and four draws out of 17 matches played. Their form in the 40-overs National Cricket League was much better, and they finished on top of the league table with 12 wins, four losses and one abandoned match. In addition, Kent reached the final of Benson & Hedges Cup, where they lost to Lancashire by 35 runs despite de Silva's 112 runs. Personally for de Silva, the time spent with Kent marked the turning point in his career. He was the third most prolific batsman of the County Championship in 1995 after Mark Ramprakash and Nasser Hussain with 1661 runs at an average of 59.32 and six centuries including the highest score of the season, 255. He was also often called to perform as fifth or sixth bowler, a role where he proved to be relatively economic but an inefficient wicket-taker.

De Silva did not play in Kent's two last County Championship matches having left to join the Sri Lankan squad on their tour of Pakistan.

On 28 July 2007 he made a one-off appearance for a friend for Dorset county league team Sherborne.

== International career ==
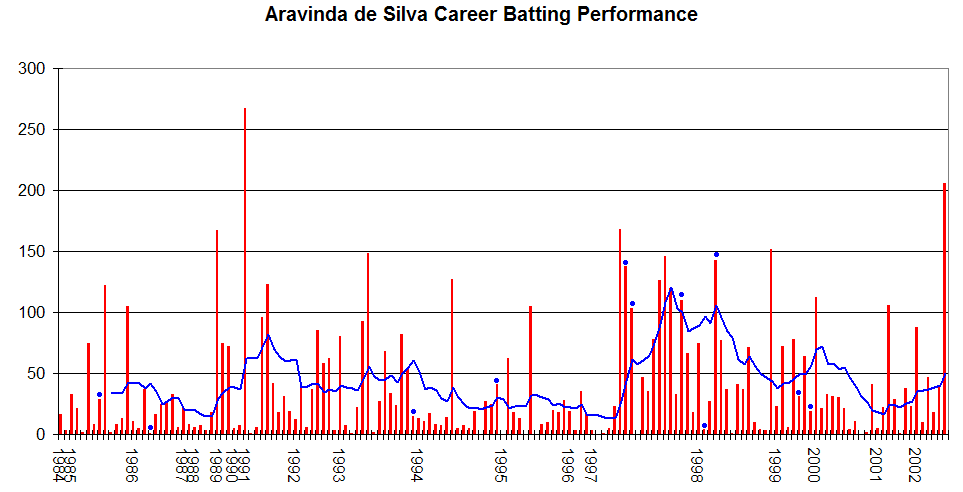
Aravinda de Silva's test batting performance

He made his Test match debut in 1984 at Lord's against England. During the early part of his career he was known as a dashing but inconsistent batsman – he was given the nickname "Mad Max" for his tendency to get out to rash shots. He later commented on his aggressive batting style: "That's my natural game – I don't want to change because I feel confident playing that way. If someone is capable of dominating the bowling, they should do it. It's the way I've been playing since I was a youngster."

De Silva was instrumental in Sri Lanka's triumph in the 1996 Cricket World Cup where his unbeaten century and three wickets earned him the Man of the Match award in the final against Australia. His other notable achievements include scoring a century in each innings of a Test match on two occasions (only bettered by India's Sunil Gavaskar, Australia's Ricky Ponting and David Warner, who each performed this feat three times). One of these doubles was 138 and 105, both unbeaten, against Pakistan at Colombo's Sinhalese Sports Club in April 1997. This made him the first, and so far only, player to score two unbeaten centuries in the same Test match. As he had scored 168 in the second innings of the previous Test, he posted three hundreds in eight days. He finished the year with 1,220 runs at 76.25.

Sri Lanka had embarrassingly lost a first-class match against Pakistan Cricket Board Patron's XI and the following first Test against Pakistan both by an innings. He joined the team only few days before the second Test and was dismissed for a duck in the first innings; however, in Sri Lanka's second innings his third wicket stand of 176 runs with Chandika Hathurusingha helped to win the Test for Sri Lanka. Sri Lanka went on to win the third Test and clinch the Test series against Pakistan 2–1. Sri Lanka also proved victorious with the same numbers in the subsequent three-match ODI-series against Pakistan, where de Silva was Sri Lanka's leading wicket-taker with five wickets at an average of 17.80.

In the three-nation Champions Trophy tournament in Sharjah in October 1995 with Pakistan and West Indies each team ended up with two wins and two losses in the preliminary round-robin stage, and West Indies and Sri Lanka were selected to play in the final due to their higher run rates. In the final Sri Lanka proved victorious by 50 runs. de Silva ended up with a modest 117 runs at an average of 29.25 in five matches. His batting form slumped lower in the three-test Series in Australia, where the Sri Lankan batsmen struggled with the bowling of Glenn McGrath, who took 21 wickets while de Silva managed 98 runs at an average of 16.33. In the third test he acted as captain after the regular captain Arjuna Ranatunga pulled out due to finger injury. The series was shrouded in controversy, as in the first Test Sri Lanka was first found guilty of ball-tampering only to be exonerated later by International Cricket Council, while in the second Test the Australian umpire Darrell Hair no-balled Sri Lankan bowler Muttiah Muralitharan seven times in just three overs for throwing. Concurrently with the Test series Sri Lanka also participated in three-nation ODI series with Australia and West Indies. In the seventh match of the tournament against West Indies Muralitharan was again called for throwing and did not play again in the ODI series. The tournament was won by Australia, who beat Sri Lanka in both final matches, confirming their favourite position in the forthcoming ICC World Cup in the Indian sub-continent. In the absence of Ranatunga, de Silva captained Sri Lanka in the ODI tournament until Ranatunga returned in the later stages and finished the series as Sri Lanka's top batsman with 258 runs at an average of 25.80.

In 1996 World Cup, Sri Lanka, who hosted the cup together with India and Pakistan, played only three games in the preliminary rounds as both West Indies and Australia forfeited their matches in Colombo due to security reasons. Neither Zimbabwe nor Kenya were able to truly test Sri Lanka team – in both matches de Silva was selected man-of-the-match following his 91 and 145 runs with bat. de Silva's 145 from 115 balls against Kenya was the highest ever score for Sri Lanka in ODIs, and the third highest in 1996 World Cup. India proved a stronger opponent, but despite Sachin Tendulkar's 137 runs, Sri Lanka cruised to a comfortable six wicket victory.

In the quarter-finals Sri Lanka defeated England by five wickets, the first time they had ever beaten England outside Sri Lanka. Their semi-final opponent was India, which had beaten Pakistan in their quarter-final match. Winning the toss at Eden Gardens, Calcutta, India selected to field and had a very good start with Javagal Srinath dispatching the Sri Lankan opening pair for only one run. Coming in at number four, de Silva lead the Sri Lankan recovery hitting 66 runs from 47 balls as Sri Lanka set a target of 252 runs for India to chase. His 66 runs does not really stand out in statistics tables, however is regarded as one of his finest innings. In their response, the batsmen of India failed to score with the exception of Tendulkar (65 runs). After India had collapsed to 120 runs for 8 wickets at 34.1 overs, a densely packed home crowd vented their anger by throwing bottles on to the outfield and setting fire to the seating. Eventually the match referee Clive Lloyd had to abandon the game and Sri Lanka won by default.

However, the highlight of his career was almost certainly the 1996 World Cup Final against Australia, where he took 3 wickets for 42 runs (including the Australian captain Mark Taylor and the future captain Ricky Ponting), two catches and then followed that with 107 not out with the bat to secure Sri Lanka a convincing 7 wicket victory, thereby clinching the World Cup, and also the Man of the Match award. His role in the final was recognised by Wisden in 2002 as the eighth most significant batting performance in ODI cricket while his bowling was ranked 82nd in Wisden top 100 bowling chart.

De Silva's eight centuries makes him the top century scorer against Pakistan, against a bowling attack spearheaded by Imran Khan, Wasim Akram, Waqar Younis and Abdul Qadir. His highest test score of 267 was made at Basin Reserve in 1991 against New Zealand. He scored another double century in his final Test innings as well as picking up a wicket with his final delivery in Test cricket (against Bangladesh in 2002), thus retiring with a place in cricket's history secure – from all international cricket after the 2003 Cricket World Cup.

== Recognition ==
De Silva was selected as one of the five Wisden Cricketers of the Year in 1996 and one of the five Sri Lankan cricketers named on the prestigious list. The Wisden list of top 100 batting performances contains six entries for him, only one less than the West Indies batsman Viv Richards. In 2023 De Silva was inducted into ICC Hall of Fame, making him the 4th Sri Lankan to receive that honor.

== Personal life ==
He is a devout buddhist.

== After cricket ==
He was appointed as the chairman of the national selection committee briefly before stepping down after the ICC Cricket World Cup 2011. de Silva was again appointed as the head of the national selection committee on 7 March 2016, by Sports minister Dayasiri Jayasekara, prior to 2016 ICC World Twenty20 tournament. de Silva resigned from his post on 5 May 2017, after completing 13 months of duration in his post.

== Match Fixing Allegations ==
De Silva came under fire, for being accused of taking money to fix cricket matches, these accusations were also levelled against Arjuna Ranatunga.

=== 1990s ===
There were allegations made by Former cricket board chief Thilanga Sumathipala, accusing these two of being the first Sri Lankan cricketers to have taken bribes from cricket bookies.

Sumathipala, himself having been accused of corruption allegations in the past, stated that de Silva and Ranatunga were involved with Mukesh Kumar Gupta, better known as MK Gupta, a notorious Mumbai bookmaker in the 1990s.

Gupta who subsequently became a full blown whistle blower, had informed the Indian investigators, that he had paid de Silva US$15000 – to fix a Lucknow Test in 1994 between Sri Lanka and India, where Sri Lanka lost by an inning and 119 runs. de Silva denied this, despite admitting that he knew Gupta.

Following an investigation before a local enquiry in 2001, headed by Desmond Fernando, Gupta failed to testify before this inquiry, and thus both de Silva and Ranatunga were cleared.

=== 2011 ===
Following Sri Lanka's defeat to India in the 2011 Cricket World Cup Finals. An investigation was prompted by former sports minister Mahindananda Aluthgamage, who cast a shadow of doubt on the match.

De Silva was questioned for six hours by the sports-related anti-corruption unit about match fixing. Based on the given statements and findings, Upul Tharanga was also summoned to be questioned.

== International performance ==
=== Test match performance ===
- Test debut: vs England at Lord's, London August 1984.
- Last Test: vs Bangladesh at Paikiasothy Saravanamuttu Stadium, Colombo July 2002.
- Captained Sri Lanka in six Tests: two draws and four losses.

=== ODI performance ===
- ODI debut: vs New Zealand at Moratuwa, 31 March 1984.
- Last ODI: vs Australia at St George's Park, Port Elizabeth, 18 March 2003.
- Captained Sri Lanka in 18 One-day Internationals: 5 victories, 12 losses and 1 no result.
