= Sri Lankan cricket team in Pakistan in 1991–92 =

International cricket tour

Sri Lankan cricket team in Pakistan in 1991-92
| | Sri Lanka | Pakistan |

Test series
- Result: Pakistan won the 3-match series 1–0
| Most runs | Sanath Jayasuriya (238) | Ramiz Raja (220) |
| Most wickets | Pramodya Wickramasinghe (8) | Waqar Younis (16) |

One Day International series
- Results: Pakistan won the 5-match series 4–1
| Most runs | Hashan Tillakaratne (156) | Inzamam-ul-Haq (326) |
| Most wickets | Champaka Ramanayake (6) | Aaqib Javed (8) |

The Sri Lanka national cricket team toured Pakistan from December 1991 to January 1992 and played a three-match Test series against the Pakistan national cricket team. Pakistan won the Test series 1–0. Sri Lanka were captained by Aravinda de Silva and Pakistan by Imran Khan. In addition, the teams played a five-match Limited Overs International (LOI) series which Pakistan won 4–1.

== Squads ==
| Tests | | ODIs | |
| Pakistan | Sri Lanka | Pakistan | Sri Lanka |
|---|---|---|---|
| Imran Khan (c); Moin Khan (wk); Akram Raza; Waqar Younis; Aaqib Javed; Shoaib Mohammad; Zahid Fazal; Saleem Malik; Javed Miandad; Wasim Akram; Ramiz Raja; Zahid Fazal; Saleem Jaffar | Aravinda de Silva (c); Hashan Tillakaratne (wk); Roshan Mahanama; Chandika Hathurusingha; Asanka Gurusinha; Athula Samarasekera; Kapila Wijegunawardene; Champaka Ramanayake; Pramodya Wickramasinghe; Don Anurasiri; Sanath Jayasuriya; Rumesh Ratnayake; Arjuna Ranatunga | Imran Khan (c); Moin Khan (wk); Akram Raza; Waqar Younis; Aaqib Javed; Shoaib Mohammad; Zahid Fazal; Saleem Malik; Javed Miandad; Wasim Akram; Inzamam-ul-Haq; Ramiz Raja; Ijaz Ahmed; Mushtaq Ahmed | Aravinda de Silva (c); Hashan Tillakaratne (wk); Roshan Mahanama; Chandika Hathurusingha; Asanka Gurusinha; Athula Samarasekera; Kapila Wijegunawardene; Champaka Ramanayake; Pramodya Wickramasinghe; Marvan Atapattu; Graeme Labrooy; Sanath Jayasuriya; Ruwan Kalpage; Rumesh Ratnayake; Ranjith Madurasinghe; Don Anurasiri |

== Test series summary ==
=== 1st Test ===
12–17 December 1991
(5-day match)
Scorecard

| Sri Lanka | v | Pakistan |
| 270 (118.5 overs); ST Jayasuriya 77 (168); Waqar Younis 5/84 (30.5 overs) | | 423/5d (157 overs); Saleem Malik 101 (207); SD Anurasiri 3/106 (61 overs) |
| 137/5 (46.4 overs); HP Tillakaratne 42 * (75); Waqar Younis 2/43 (14.4 overs) |

Match drawn
Jinnah Stadium, Sialkot
Umpires: Ikram Rabbani and Khizer Hayat
Player of the match: Saleem Malik (PAK)

- Sri Lanka won the toss and elected to bat.
- 15 December was taken as a rest day.
- GP Wickramasinghe (SL) made his Test debut.

=== 2nd Test ===
20–25 December 1991
(5-day match)
Scorecard

| Pakistan | v | Sri Lanka |
| 109/2 (36 overs); Rameez Raja 51* (102); GP Wickramasinghe 1/27 (7 overs) |

Match drawn
Municipal Stadium, Gujranwala
Umpires: Athar Zaidi and Khizer Hayat

- Sri Lanka won the toss and elected to field.
- 23 December was taken as a rest day.
- There was no play on the second, third, fourth or fifth days.

=== 3rd Test ===
2–7 January 1992
(5-day match)
Scorecard

| Sri Lanka | v | Pakistan |
| 240 (72.1 overs); ST Jayasuriya 81 (95); Waqar Younis 4/87 (21 overs) | | 221 (106.2 overs); Rameez Raja 63 (147); GP Wickramasinghe 5/73 (32 overs) |
| 165 (51 overs); ST Jayasuriya 45 (87); Waqar Younis 5/65 (17 overs) | | 188/7 (70.5 overs); Zahid Fazal 78 (164); KIW Wijegunawardene 4/51 (17.2 overs) |

Pakistan won by 3 wickets
Iqbal Stadium, Faisalabad
Umpires: Khalid Aziz and Shakoor Rana
Player of the match: Wasim Akram (PAK)

- Pakistan won the toss and elected to field.
- 5 January was taken as a rest day.

== One Day Internationals (ODIs) ==
Pakistan won the series 4–1.

=== 1st ODI ===
10 January 1992
Scorecard

| Sri Lanka; 155/6 (40 overs) | v | Pakistan; 157/2 (36.5 overs) |
| HP Tillakaratne 37* (34); Waqar Younis 2/13 (8 overs) | | Rameez Raja 74 (83); CPH Ramanayake 1/19 (6 overs) |

Pakistan won by 8 wickets
Sports Stadium, Sargodha
Umpires: Amanullah Khan and Khizer Hayat
Player of the match: Rameez Raja (PAK)

- Pakistan won the toss and elected to field.
- UC Hathurusingha and RS Kalpage (both SL) made their ODI debuts.

=== 2nd ODI ===
13 January 1992
Scorecard

| Pakistan; 210/5 (40 overs) | v | Sri Lanka; 181 (36.1 overs) |
| Inzamam-ul-Haq 48 (70); KIW Wijegunawardene 2/43 (8 overs) | | RS Mahanama 60 retired hurt (79); Wasim Akram 3/31 (6.1 overs) |

Pakistan won by 29 runs
National Stadium, Karachi
Umpires: Mahboob Shah and Riazuddin
Player of the match: Imran Khan (PAK)

- Sri Lanka won the toss and elected to field.

=== 3rd ODI ===
15 January 1992
Scorecard

| Pakistan; 241/3 (40 overs) | v | Sri Lanka; 182/9 (40 overs) |
| Javed Miandad 115* (103); CPH Ramanayake 1/26 (8 overs) | | HP Tillakaratne 44 (52); Imran Khan 3/15 (8 overs) |

Pakistan won by 59 runs
Niaz Stadium, Hyderabad
Umpires: Shakeel Khan and Taufeeq Khan
Player of the match: Javed Miandad (PAK)

- Sri Lanka won the toss and elected to field.

=== 4th ODI ===
17 January 1992
Scorecard

| Pakistan; 205/5 (40 overs) | v | Sri Lanka; 206/6 (39.4 overs) |
| Inzamam-ul-Haq 101 (121); CPH Ramanayake 2/30 (8 overs) | | MAR Samarasekera 76 (88); Mushtaq Ahmed 2/37 (8 overs) |

Sri Lanka won by 4 wickets
Ibn-e-Qasim Bagh Stadium, Multan
Umpires: Mian Mohammad Aslam and Shakoor Rana
Player of the match: Inzamam-ul-Haq (PAK)

- Sri Lanka won the toss and elected to field.

=== 5th ODI ===
19 January 1992
Scorecard

| Pakistan; 271/4 (40 overs) | v | Sri Lanka; 154 (38.4 overs) |
| Inzamam-ul-Haq 117 (103); CPH Ramanayake 2/48 (8 overs) | | HP Tillakaratne 36 (46); Aaqib Javed 2/25 (6 overs) |

Pakistan won by 117 runs
Rawalpindi Cricket Stadium, Rawalpindi
Umpires: Javed Akhtar and Siddiq Khan
Player of the match: Inzamam-ul-Haq (PAK)

- Sri Lanka won the toss and elected to field.

== Records and statistics ==
=== Batting ===
Test
| Player | Nat | Matches | Innings | Runs | NO | Ave. | SR | HS | 100 | 50 | 4s | 6s |
|---|---|---|---|---|---|---|---|---|---|---|---|---|
| Sanath Jayasuriya | (Sri Lanka) | 3 | 4 | 238 | 1 | 79.33 | 57.21 | 81 | 0 | 2 | 37 | 0 |
| Ramiz Raja | (Pakistan) | 3 | 4 | 220 | 1 | 73.33 | 41.50 | 98 | 0 | 3 | 26 | 0 |
| Zahid Fazal | (Pakistan) | 3 | 4 | 148 | 0 | 37.00 | 31.82 | 78 | 0 | 1 | 21 | 0 |
| Hashan Tillakaratne | (Sri Lanka) | 3 | 4 | 116 | 1 | 38.66 | 33.23 | 49 | 0 | 0 | 11 | 0 |
| Imran Khan | (Pakistan) | 3 | 3 | 115 | 1 | 57.50 | 41.81 | 93* | 0 | 1 | 13 | 3 |
ODI
| Player | Nat | Matches | Innings | Runs | NO | Ave. | SR | HS | 100 | 50 | 4s | 6s |
| Inzamam-ul-Haq | (Pakistan) | 5 | 4 | 326 | 0 | 81.50 | 87.63 | 117 | 2 | 3 | 30 | 3 |
| Javed Miandad | (Pakistan) | 5 | 4 | 223 | 2 | 111.50 | 87.79 | 115* | 1 | 1 | 21 | 4 |
| Saleem Malik | (Pakistan) | 5 | 4 | 187 | 1 | 62.33 | 92.57 | 102 | 1 | 0 | 11 | 0 |
| Ramiz Raja | (Pakistan) | 5 | 5 | 178 | 0 | 35.60 | 65.68 | 74 | 0 | 2 | 17 | 0 |
| Hashan Tillakaratne | (Sri Lanka) | 5 | 5 | 156 | 2 | 52.00 | 81.25 | 44 | 0 | 0 | 7 | 2 |
Source: Cricinfo

=== Bowling ===
Test
| Player | Nat | Matches | Innings | Wickets | Overs | Runs | Econ. | Ave. | BBI | 5WI | 10WI |
|---|---|---|---|---|---|---|---|---|---|---|---|
| Waqar Younis | (Pakistan) | 3 | 4 | 16 | 83.3 | 279 | 3.34 | 17.43 | 5/65 | 2 | 0 |
| Pramodya Wickramasinghe | (Sri Lanka) | 3 | 4 | 8 | 92.0 | 273 | 2.96 | 34.12 | 5/73 | 1 | 0 |
| Kapila Wijegunawardene | (Sri Lanka) | 1 | 2 | 7 | 48.4 | 98 | 2.01 | 14.00 | 4/51 | 0 | 0 |
| Aaqib Javed | (Pakistan) | 3 | 4 | 6 | 50.1 | 145 | 2.89 | 24.16 | 3/70 | 0 | 0 |
| Wasim Akram | (Pakistan) | 3 | 4 | 6 | 85.0 | 211 | 2.48 | 35.16 | 3/71 | 0 | 0 |
ODI
| Player | Nat | Matches | Innings | Wickets | Overs | Runs | Econ. | Ave. | BBI | 4WI | 5WI |
| Aaqib Javed | (Pakistan) | 5 | 5 | 8 | 35.4 | 140 | 3.92 | 17.50 | 3/30 | 0 | 0 |
| Waqar Younis | (Pakistan) | 5 | 5 | 7 | 40.4 | 171 | 4.27 | 24.42 | 2/13 | 0 | 0 |
| Champaka Ramanayake | (Sri Lanka) | 5 | 5 | 6 | 36.0 | 140 | 3.88 | 23.33 | 2/30 | 0 | 0 |
| Wasim Akram | (Pakistan) | 5 | 5 | 6 | 38.1 | 149 | 3.90 | 24.83 | 3/31 | 0 | 0 |
| Mushtaq Ahmed | (Pakistan) | 4 | 4 | 6 | 32.0 | 152 | 4.75 | 25.33 | 2/37 | 0 | 0 |
| Kapila Wijegunawardene | (Sri Lanka) | 5 | 5 | 6 | 38.0 | 238 | 6.26 | 39.66 | 2/43 | 0 | 0 |
Source: Cricinfo
