= Australian cricket team in Sri Lanka in 1992 =

International cricket tour

	Sri Lanka	Australia

Test series
- Result: Australia won the 3-match series 1–0
Most runs	Roshan Mahanama (250)	Greg Matthews (329)
Most wickets	Champaka Ramanayake (17)	Craig McDermott (14)

One Day International series
- Results: Sri Lanka won the 3-match series 2–1
Most runs	Aravinda de Silva (207)	Mark Taylor (138)
Most wickets	Greg Matthews (5)	Champaka Ramanayake (5)

The Australian cricket team toured Sri Lanka from 10 August to 13 September 1992 to play three Test matches, three One Day Internationals (ODIs).

This was a historical test series for Sri Lanka as this was the first home series for Sri Lanka after 1987. One of the highlights of the series was the emergence of Shane Warne. Another highlight was wicket keeping batsman Romesh Kaluwitharane scoring his maiden test ton on debut at SSC.

The first test at SSC turned out to be a famous test match as Sri Lanka collapsed for 164 in pursuit of 180. Especially where Sri Lanka was comfortably led by 291 runs in the first innings.

Australian captain Allan Border said after this match that the result achieved by his team must be the ‘greatest heist since the Great Train Robbery’.

== Squads ==
Tests		ODIs	
Australia	Sri Lanka	Australia	Sri Lanka
Allan Border (c); Ian Healy (wk); Mark Taylor; Tom Moody; David Boon; Dean Jones; Mark Waugh; Greg Matthews; Craig McDermott; Shane Warne; Mike Whitney; Tony Dodemaide	Arjuna Ranatunga (c); Romesh Kaluwitharana (wk); Roshan Mahanama; Chandika Hathurusingha; Asanka Gurusinha; Aravinda de Silva; Marvan Atapattu; Champaka Ramanayake; Pramodya Wickramasinghe; Ranjith Madurasinghe; Don Anurasiri; Sanath Jayasuriya; Dulip Liyanage; Muthiah Muralidaran; Hashan Tillakaratne (wk)	Allan Border (c); Ian Healy (wk); Mark Taylor; Tom Moody; David Boon; Dean Jones; Mark Waugh; Greg Matthews; Craig McDermott; Shane Warne; Mike Whitney; Tony Dodemaide	Arjuna Ranatunga (c); Romesh Kaluwitharana (wk); Roshan Mahanama; Chandika Hathurusingha; Asanka Gurusinha; Aravinda de Silva; Marvan Atapattu; Champaka Ramanayake; Pramodya Wickramasinghe; Ranjith Madurasinghe; Don Anurasiri; Sanath Jayasuriya; Dulip Liyanage; Muthiah Muralidaran; Hashan Tillakaratne; Ruwan Kalpage; Asoka de Silva

- Damien Martyn was part of the Australian squad but played only in a 3-day match against Southern Districts XI.

== Test series ==
=== 1st Test ===
17–22 August 1992
Scorecard

Australia	v	Sri Lanka
256 (84 overs); Ian Healy 66* (144); Chandika Hathurusingha 4/66 (22 overs)		547/8d (170 overs); Asanka Gurusinha 137 (399); Greg Matthews 3/93 (38 overs)
471 (132 overs); David Boon 68 (149); Don Anurasiri 4/127 (35 overs)		164 (51.1 overs); Roshan Mahanama 39 (73); Greg Matthews 4/76 (20 overs)

Australia won by 16 runs
Sinhalese Sports Club Ground, Colombo
Umpires: K. T. Francis (SL) and T. M. Samarasinghe (SL)
Player of the match: Greg Matthews

- Sri Lanka won the toss and elected to field.
- Rain delayed the start of play until 10.08am (8 mins lost)
- Rain stopped play from 11.50am to 12.35pm and Early lunch taken (no time lost)
- Romesh Kaluwitharana (SL) made his Test debuts.

=== 2nd Test ===
28 August – 2 September 1992
Scorecard

Australia	v	Sri Lanka
247 (96.3 overs); Dean Jones 77 (153); Champaka Ramanayake 3/64 (23.3 overs)		258/9d (92 overs); Aravinda de Silva 85 (188); Craig McDermott 4/53 (20 overs)
296/6d (115 overs); Dean Jones 100* (213); Don Anurasiri 3/66 (44 overs)		136/2 (54 overs); Roshan Mahanama 69 (140); Craig McDermott 2/32 (19 overs)

Match drawn
R. Premadasa Stadium, Colombo
Umpires: Udaya Wickramasinghe (SL) and Ignatius Anandappa (SL)
Player of the match: Dean Jones

- Dulip Liyanage and Muttiah Muralitharan (both SL) made their debut.

=== 3rd Test ===
8–13 September 1992
Scorecard

Australia	v	Sri Lanka
337 (111.1 overs); Allan Border 106 (169); Champaka Ramanayake 5/82 (31 overs)		247 (99.5 overs); Hashan Tillakaratne 82 (179); Tony Dodemaide 4/65
271 (92.1 overs); Greg Matthews 96 (227); Dulip Liyanage 4/56

Match drawn
Tyronne Fernando Stadium, Moratuwa
Umpires: B.C. Cooray (SL) and K.T. Francis (SL)
Player of the match: Allan Border (Aus)

- Australia won the toss and elected to bat
- Mark Waugh makes his second consecutive "pair", only the 6th player to do so (and the first recognized batsman).

== ODI series ==
=== 1st ODI ===
10 August 1992
Scorecard

Australia; 247/5 (50 overs)	v	Sri Lanka; 251/6 (49.2 overs)
Mark Taylor 94 (129); Ruwan Kalpage 2/52 (9.5 overs)		Aravinda de Silva 105 (105); Mike Whitney 2/33 (10 overs)

Sri Lanka won by 4 wickets
P Sara Oval, Colombo
Umpires: B.C. Cooray (SL) & Udaya Wickramasinghe (Sri)
Player of the match: Aravinda de Silva (SL)

- Sri Lanka won the toss and elected to field

=== 2nd ODI ===
4 September 1992
Scorecard

Australia; 216/7 (50 overs)	v	Sri Lanka; 194/5 (42.5 overs)
Dean Jones 59 (89); Champaka Ramanayake 2/43 (10 overs)		Chandika Hathurusingha 52* (92); Greg Matthews 2/34 (6.5 overs)

Sri Lanka won by 5 wickets (Run rate)
R. Premadasa Stadium, Colombo
Umpires: B.C. Cooray (SL) & T.M. Samarasinghe (Sri)
Player of the match: Chandika Hathurusingha (SL)

- Sri Lanka won the toss and elected to field
- Sri Lanka's target was reduced to 191 runs in 44 overs.

=== 3rd ODI ===
5 September 1992 (D/N)
Scorecard

Sri Lanka; 207/6 (50 overs)	v	Australia; 208/5 (47.5 overs)
Asanka Gurusinha 49 (90); Greg Matthews 2/33 (10 overs)		David Boon 69* (96); Champaka Ramanayake 2/34 (8.5 overs)

Australia won by 5 wickets
R. Premadasa Stadium, Colombo
Umpires: Ignatius Anandappa (SL) & Udaya Wickramasinghe (Sri)
Player of the match: David Boon (Aus)

- Australia won the toss and elected to field
- First ever ODI played under lights in Sri Lanka.

== Records and statistics ==
=== Batting ===
Test
Player	Nat	Matches	Innings	Runs	NO	Ave.	SR	HS	100	50	4s	6s
Greg Matthews	(Australia)	3	6	329	0	54.83	46.33	96	0	5	27	1
Dean Jones	(Australia)	3	6	276	1	55.20	51.68	100*	1	2	26	2
Roshan Mahanama	(Sri Lanka)	3	5	250	0	50.00	49.11	78	0	3	31	1
Allan Border	(Australia)	3	6	243	0	40.50	48.40	106	1	1	28	1
Asanka Gurusinha	(Sri Lanka)	3	5	205	2	68.33	35.46	137	1	0	26	0
ODI
Player	Nat	Matches	Innings	Runs	NO	Ave.	SR	HS	100	50	4s	6s
Aravinda de Silva	(Sri Lanka)	3	3	207	0	69.00	95.83	105	1	1	18	2
Mark Taylor	(Australia)	3	3	138	0	46.00	59.74	94	0	1	11	1
Asanka Gurusinha	(Sri Lanka)	3	3	106	2	35.33	54.63	53	0	1	10	2
Dean Jones	(Australia)	3	3	106	1	53.00	68.83	59*	0	1	5	1
David Boon	(Australia)	3	3	104	1	52.00	66.24	69*	0	1	6	0
Source: Cricinfo

=== Bowling ===
Test
Player	Nat	Matches	Innings	Wickets	Overs	Runs	Econ.	Ave.	BBI	5WI	10WI
Champaka Ramanayake	(Sri Lanka)	3	6	17	145.4	434	2.97	25.52	5/82	1	0
Craig McDermott	(Australia)	3	5	14	124.0	342	2.75	24.42	4/53	0	0
Don Anurasiri	(Sri Lanka)	3	6	10	150.0	338	2.25	33.80	4/127	0	0
Dulip Liyanage	(Sri Lanka)	2	5	8	76.0	223	2.93	27.87	4/56	0	0
Chandika Hathurusingha	(Sri Lanka)	3	6	8	95.0	236	2.48	29.50	4/66	0	0
Greg Matthews	(Australia)	3	5	8	120.0	312	2.60	39.00	4/76	0	0
ODI
Player	Nat	Matches	Innings	Wickets	Overs	Runs	Econ.	Ave.	BBI	4WI	5WI
Greg Matthews	(Australia)	3	3	5	26.5	101	3.76	20.20	2/33	0	0
Champaka Ramanayake	(Sri Lanka)	3	3	5	28.5	131	4.54	26.20	2/34	0	0
Mike Whitney	(Australia)	3	3	4	27.0	100	3.70	25.00	2/33	0	0
Tony Dodemaide	(Australia)	3	3	3	30.0	133	4.43	44.33	1/39	0	0
Craig McDermott	(Australia)	3	3	3	28.2	138	4.87	46.00	1/30	0	0
Source: Cricinfo
