= 1994 Singer World Series =

International cricket tournament

- Dates: 5 – 17 September 1994
- Administrator(s): Sri Lanka Cricket (SLC)
- Cricket format: One Day International
- Tournament format(s): Round-robin and Knockout
- Host(s): Sri Lanka
- Champions: India
- Runners-up: Sri Lanka
- Matches: 8
- Player of the series: (Sri Lanka) Arjuna Ranatunga
- Most runs: Arjuna Ranatunga (196)
- Most wickets: Shane Warne (7)

The Singer World Series was a quadrangular ODI cricket tournament held in Sri Lanka from 4 to 17 September 1994. It featured the national cricket teams of Pakistan, Australia, India and the hosts, Sri Lanka. The competition was won by India, which defeated Sri Lanka in the final.

== Background ==
A multi-nation tournament was to be held in Sri Lanka after a long time, owing to troubles due to the civil war. All matches of the tournament were scheduled to be played in Colombo. Cammie Smith was named the referee for all matches.

Sri Lanka entered the tournament on the back of a Test and ODI series loss to Pakistan, the latter by a 1–4 margin. World champions Pakistan were touted favorites to win the series. A winner's prize of US$15,000 and US$7,500 for the runner-up was announced.

== Squads ==
Sri Lanka	Australia	India	Pakistan
Arjuna Ranatunga (c); Aravinda de Silva; Roshan Mahanama; Ruwan Kalpage; Kumar Dharmasena; Sanjeeva Ranatunga; Sanath Jayasuriya; Pubudu Dassanayake (wk); Roshan Mahanama; Upul Chandana; Hashan Tillakaratne; Chaminda Vaas; Pramodya Wickremasinghe	Mark Taylor (c); Michael Slater; David Boon; Mark Waugh; Steve Waugh; Ian Healy (wk); Michael Bevan; Darren Lehmann; Craig McDermott; Glenn McGrath; Tim May; Justin Langer; Gavin Robertson; Damien Fleming; Jo Angel	Mohammad Azharuddin(c); Sachin Tendulkar; Anil Kumble; Manoj Prabhakar; Navjot Singh Sidhu; Vinod Kambli; Atul Bedade; Kapil Dev; Javagal Srinath; Ajay Jadeja; Nayan Mongia (wk); Rajesh Chauhan; Venkatapathy Raju	Saleem Malik (c); Saeed Anwar; Aamer Sohail; Inzamam-ul-Haq; Basit Ali; Rashid Latif (wk); Wasim Akram; Akram Raza; Waqar Younis; Mushtaq Ahmed; Asif Mujtaba; Zahid Fazal; Kabir Khan

== Points table ==
The tournament was organised in a round robin format, with each team playing each other once.

Team	P	W	L	T	NR	NRR	Points
Sri Lanka	3	3	0	0	0		6
India	3	1	1	0	1		3
Australia	3	1	2	0	0		2
Pakistan	3	0	2	0	1		1

== Matches ==
4 September
Scorecard

India; 16/0 (4 overs)	v	Sri Lanka
Sachin Tendulkar 11* (16)

No result
R. Premadasa Stadium, Colombo
Umpires: K. T. Francis (SL) and Brian Aldridge (NZ)

- Sri Lanka won the toss and elected to field.

5 September
Scorecard

India; 125/5 (25 overs)	v	Sri Lanka; 126/3 (24.2 overs)
Vinod Kambli 30* (39); Pramodya Wickramasinghe 3/28 (5 overs)		Roshan Mahanama 50 (78); Anil Kumble 1/17 (5 overs)

Sri Lanka won by 7 wickets
R. Premadasa Stadium, Colombo
Umpires: K.T. Francis (SL) and Brian Aldridge (NZ)
Player of the match: Pramodya Wickramasinghe (SL)

- Sri Lanka won the toss and elected to field.
- Match reduced to 25 overs per side

7 September
Scorecard

Australia; 179/7 (50 overs)	v	Pakistan; 151/9 (50 overs)
Michael Bevan 37 (73); Wasim Akram 3/24 (10 overs)		Saeed Anwar 46 (78); Steve Waugh 3/16 (10 overs)

Australia won by 28 runs
R. Premadasa Stadium, Colombo
Umpires: Udaya Wickramasinghe (SL) and B. C. Cooray (SL)
Player of the match: Shane Warne (AUS)

- Australia won the toss and elected to bat.

9 September
Scorecard

India; 246/8 (50 overs)	v	Australia; 215 (47.4 overs)
Sachin Tendulkar 110 (130); Craig McDermott 2/46 (10 overs)		Mark Waugh 61 (81); Manoj Prabhakar 3/34 (8 overs)

India won by 31 runs
R. Premadasa Stadium, Colombo
Umpires: T. M. Samarasinghe (SL) and Ignatius Anandappa (SL)
Player of the match: Sachin Tendulkar (Ind)

- India won the toss and elected to bat.
- Sachin Tendulkar (Ind) scored his first century in ODIs.

11 September
Scorecard

Pakistan; 210/6 (50 overs)	v	Sri Lanka; 213/3 (47.2 overs)
Saleem Malik 53 (85); Ruwan Kalpage 1/32 (8 overs)		Arjuna Ranatunga 82 (76); Mushtaq Ahmed 1/31 (8 overs)

Sri Lanka won by 7 wickets
Sinhalese Sports Club Ground, Colombo
Umpires: Brian Aldridge (NZ) and Peter Manuel (SL)
Player of the match: Arjuna Ranatunga (SL)

- Sri Lanka won the toss and elected to field.
- Kabir Khan (Pak) made his ODI debut.

13 September
Scorecard

Australia; 225/6 (50 overs)	v	Sri Lanka; 164/4 (34.4 overs)
Michael Bevan 47 (54); Sanath Jayasuriya 2/42 (10 overs)		Arjuna Ranatunga 59 (71); Shane Warne 2/27 (8 overs)

Sri Lanka won by 6 runs with 8 balls remaining (Revised target)
P. Sara Oval, Colombo
Umpires: T. M. Samarasinghe (SL) and Brian Aldridge (NZ)
Player of the match: Arjuna Ranatunga (SL)

- India won the toss and elected to bat.
- Gavin Robertson and Jo Angel (Aus) made his ODI debuts.

15–16 September
Scorecard

India	v	Pakistan

Match abandoned without a ball bowled
R. Premadasa Stadium, Colombo

- No toss

=== Final ===
17 September
Scorecard

Sri Lanka; 98/9 (25 overs)	v	India; 99/4 (23.4 overs)
Ruwan Kalpage 39 (57); Manoj Prabhakar 2/19 (5 overs)		Mohammad Azharuddin 45 (51); Pramodya Wickramasinghe 2/13 (5 overs)

India won by 6 wickets
Sinhalese Sports Club Ground, Colombo (transferred from R. Premadasa Stadium, Colombo)
Umpires: Brian Aldridge (NZ) and K. T. Francis (SL)
Player of the match: Mohammad Azharuddin (IND)

- India won the toss and elected to field.
- The match was reduced to 25 overs maximum per innings.

== Records and awards ==
Sri Lanka's captain Arjuna Ranatunga won the player of the series award; India's Sachin Tendulkar won the batsmen of the series award; and Australia's Steve Waugh was awarded the bowler of the series award.
