= Pakistani cricket team in Sri Lanka in 1994 =

International cricket tour

The Pakistan national cricket team toured Sri Lanka in August and September 1994, outside the normal cricket season, for a three-match Test series and five Limited Overs International matches. Pakistan won the Test series 2–0.

== Test series summary ==
=== 1st Test ===
9, 10, 11, 13 August 1994
(5-day match)
Scorecard

Pakistan	v	Sri Lanka
390 (126.2 overs); Saeed Anwar 94 (163); HDPK Dharmasena 6/99 (45.2 overs)		226 (68 overs); PA de Silva 127 (156); Wasim Akram 3/30 (17 overs)
318/4 dec (91 overs); Saeed Anwar 136 (218); HDPK Dharmasena 2/84 (31 overs)		181 (47 overs); A Ranatunga 41 (43); Wasim Akram 5/43 (18 overs)

Pakistan won by 301 runs
P Saravanamuttu Stadium, Colombo
Umpires: KT Francis (SL) and ID Robinson (ZIM)
Player of the match: Saeed Anwar (PAK)

- Pakistan won the toss and elected to bat.
- 12 August was taken as a rest day.
- The match was scheduled for five days but completed in four.

=== 2nd Test ===
18, 19, 20, 22, 23 August 1994
(5-day match)
Scorecard

Sri Lanka	v	Pakistan

Match cancelled
Sinhalese Sports Club Ground, Colombo

- 21 August was scheduled as a rest day.
- The match was abandoned on the first morning due to post-election curfew imposed because of fear of civil unrest.
- Two additional One Day Internationals were scheduled to replace this Test match.

=== 3rd Test ===
26, 27, 28 August 1994
(5-day match)
Scorecard

Sri Lanka	v	Pakistan
71 (28.2 overs); PB Dassanayake 19* (27); Waqar Younis 6/34 (14 overs)		357/9 dec (87.5 overs); Inzamam-ul-Haq 100* (125); HDPK Dharmasena 4/75 (28.5 overs)
234 (61.3 overs); HP Tillakaratne 83* (126); Waqar Younis 5/85 (18 overs)

Pakistan won by an innings and 52 runs
Asgiriya Stadium, Kandy
Umpires: BC Cooray (SL) and ID Robinson (ZIM)
Player of the match: Waqar Younis (PAK)

- Pakistan won the toss and elected to field.
- The match was scheduled for five days but completed in three.
- KR Pushpakumara, S Ranatunga and WPUJC Vaas (all SL), and Kabir Khan (PAK) made their Test debuts.

== ODI series ==
=== 1st ODI ===
3 August 1994 (D/N)
Scorecard

Sri Lanka; 200/6 (50 overs)	v	Pakistan; 169/1 (30.2 overs)
ST Jayasuriya 77 (106); Saleem Malik 2/44 (10 overs)		Saeed Anwar 70* (83); M Muralitharan 1/21 (4 overs)

Pakistan won by 9 wickets (run rate)
R Premadasa Stadium, Colombo
Umpires: K. T. Francis (SL) & WAU Wickremasinghe (SL)
Player of the match: Saeed Anwar (PAK)

- Sri Lanka won the toss and elected to bat
- Pakistan target was reduced to 169 runs in 42 overs
- Ashfaq Ahmed (PAK) and S Ranatunga (SL) made their ODI debuts.

=== 2nd ODI ===
6 August 1994
Scorecard

Pakistan; 180/8 (50 overs)	v	Sri Lanka; 181/3 (47.2 overs)
Saleem Malik 61 (111); RS Kalpage 4/36 (10 overs)		S Ranatunga 70 (116); Aamer Sohail 1/26 (7.2 overs)

Sri Lanka won by 7 wickets
R Premadasa Stadium, Colombo
Umpires: I Anandappa (SL) & T. M. Samarasinghe (SL)
Player of the match: S Ranatunga (SL)

- Sri Lanka won the toss and elected to field

=== 3rd ODI ===
7 August 1994
Scorecard

Pakistan; 237/7 (50 overs)	v	Sri Lanka; 218 (49 overs)
Saleem Malik 93* (94); GP Wickramasinghe 2/26 (8 overs)		ST Jayasuriya 50 (63); Wasim Akram 3/24 (9 overs)

Pakistan won by 19 runs
Sinhalese Sports Club Ground, Colombo
Umpires: B. C. Cooray (SL) & PT Manuel (SL)
Player of the match: Saleem Malik (PAK)

- Sri Lanka won the toss and elected to field

=== 4th ODI ===
22 August 1994
Scorecard

Sri Lanka; 174/9 (50 overs)	v	Pakistan; 175/5 (41.4 overs)
A Ranatunga 74 (102); Akram Raza 2/26 (10 overs)		Saleem Malik 50* (74); ST Jayasuriya 2/28 (10 overs)

Pakistan won by 5 wickets
Sinhalese Sports Club Ground, Colombo
Umpires: I Anandappa (SL) & T. M. Samarasinghe (SL)
Player of the match: Akram Raza (PAK)

- Pakistan won the toss and elected to field

=== 5th ODI ===
24 August 1994
Scorecard

Pakistan; 187 (49.5 overs)	v	Sri Lanka; 160 (48.1 overs)
Akram Raza 33* (37); HDPK Dharmasena 2/34 (9 overs)		RS Mahanama 52 (89); Wasim Akram 3/20 (9.1 overs)

Pakistan won by 27 runs
R Premadasa Stadium, Colombo
Umpires: PT Manuel (SL) & WAU Wickremasinghe (SL)
Player of the match: Waqar Younis (PAK)

- Sri Lanka won the toss and elected to field
- HDPK Dharmasena (SL) made his ODI debut.
