= International cricket in 1991–92 =

International cricket season

The 1991–1992 international cricket season was from September 1991 to April 1992.

== Season overview ==
International tours
Start date	Home team	Away team	Results [Matches]			
Start date	Home team	Away team	Test	ODI	FC	LA
10 November 1991	India	South Africa	—	2–1 [3]	—	—
20 November 1991	Pakistan	West Indies	—	0–2 [3]	—	—
29 November 1991	Australia	India	4–0 [5]	—	—	—
12 December 1991	Pakistan	Sri Lanka	1–0 [3]	4–1 [5]	—	—
18 January 1992	New Zealand	England	0–2 [3]	0–3 [3]	—	—
7 April 1992	West Indies	South Africa	1–0 [1]	3–0 [3]	—	—
International tournaments
Start date	Tournament				Winners	
17 October 1991	(United Arab Emirates) 1991–92 Wills Trophy				Pakistan	
6 December 1992	(Australia) 1991-92 Benson & Hedges World Series				Australia	
22 February 1992	(Australia) (New Zealand) 1992 Benson & Hedges World Cup				Pakistan	

== October ==
=== 1991–92 Wills Trophy ===
Group stage
No.	Date	Team 1	Captain 1	Team 2	Captain 2	Venue	Result
ODI 679	17 October	Pakistan	Imran Khan	West Indies	Richie Richardson	Sharjah Cricket Stadium, Sharjah	West Indies by 1 wicket
ODI 680	18 October	India	Mohammad Azharuddin	Pakistan	Imran Khan	Sharjah Cricket Stadium, Sharjah	India by 60 runs
ODI 681	19 October	India	Mohammad Azharuddin	West Indies	Richie Richardson	Sharjah Cricket Stadium, Sharjah	India by 19 runs
ODI 682	21 October	Pakistan	Imran Khan	West Indies	Richie Richardson	Sharjah Cricket Stadium, Sharjah	Pakistan by 1 run
ODI 683	22 October	India	Mohammad Azharuddin	West Indies	Richie Richardson	Sharjah Cricket Stadium, Sharjah	India by 7 wickets
ODI 684	23 October	India	Mohammad Azharuddin	Pakistan	Imran Khan	Sharjah Cricket Stadium, Sharjah	Pakistan by 4 runs
Final
No.	Date	Team 1	Captain 1	Team 2	Captain 2	Venue	Result
ODI 685	25 October	India	Mohammad Azharuddin	Pakistan	Imran Khan	Sharjah Cricket Stadium, Sharjah	Pakistan by 72 runs

== November ==
=== South Africa in India ===
ODI series
No.	Date	Home captain	Away captain	Venue	Result
ODI 686	10 November	Mohammad Azharuddin	Clive Rice	Eden Gardens, Kolkata	India by 3 wickets
ODI 687	12 November	Mohammad Azharuddin	Clive Rice	Captain Roop Singh Stadium, Gwalior	India by 38 runs
ODI 688	14 November	Ravi Shastri	Clive Rice	Jawaharlal Nehru Stadium, Delhi	South Africa by 8 wickets

=== West Indies in Pakistan ===
ODI series
No.	Date	Home captain	Away captain	Venue	Result
ODI 689	20 November	Imran Khan	Richie Richardson	National Stadium, Karachi	West Indies by 24 runs
ODI 690	22 November	Imran Khan	Richie Richardson	Gaddafi Stadium, Lahore	Match tied
ODI 691	24 November	Imran Khan	Richie Richardson	Iqbal Stadium, Faisalabad	West Indies by 17 runs

=== India in Australia ===
Test series
No.	Date	Home captain	Away captain	Venue	Result
Test 1177	29 November-2 December	Allan Border	Mohammad Azharuddin	The Gabba, Brisbane	Australia by 10 wickets
Test 1180	26–29 December	Allan Border	Mohammad Azharuddin	Melbourne Cricket Ground, Melbourne	Australia by 8 wickets
Test 1181	2–6 January	Allan Border	Mohammad Azharuddin	Sydney Cricket Ground, Sydney	Match drawn
Test 1184	25–29 January	Allan Border	Mohammad Azharuddin	Adelaide Oval, Adelaide	Australia by 38 runs
Test 1186	1–5 February	Allan Border	Mohammad Azharuddin	WACA Ground, Perth	Australia by 300 runs

== December ==
=== 1991-92 Benson & Hedges World Series ===
Pos	Team	P	W	L	NR	T	Points
1	Australia	8	5	2	1	0	11
2	India	8	3	4	0	1	7
3	West Indies	8	2	4	1	1	6

Group stage
No.	Date	Team 1	Captain 1	Team 2	Captain 2	Venue	Result
ODI 692	6 December	India	Mohammad Azharuddin	West Indies	Richie Richardson	WACA Ground, Perth	Match tied
ODI 693	10 December	Australia	Allan Border	India	Mohammad Azharuddin	WACA Ground, Perth	India by 107 runs
ODI 694	12 December	Australia	Allan Border	India	Mohammad Azharuddin	Bellerive Oval, Hobart	Australia by 8 wickets
ODI 696	14 December	India	Mohammad Azharuddin	West Indies	Richie Richardson	Adelaide Oval, Adelaide	India by 10 runs
ODI 697	15 December	Australia	Allan Border	India	Mohammad Azharuddin	Adelaide Oval, Adelaide	Australia by 6 wickets
ODI 698	18 December	Australia	Allan Border	West Indies	Richie Richardson	Sydney Cricket Ground, Sydney	Australia by 51 runs
ODI 699	9 January	Australia	Allan Border	West Indies	Richie Richardson	Melbourne Cricket Ground, Melbourne	No result
ODI 702	11 January	India	Mohammad Azharuddin	West Indies	Richie Richardson	The Gabba, Brisbane	West Indies by 6 wickets
ODI 703	12 January	Australia	Allan Border	West Indies	Richie Richardson	The Gabba, Brisbane	West Indies by 12 runs
ODI 705	14 January	Australia	Allan Border	India	Mohammad Azharuddin	Sydney Cricket Ground, Sydney	Australia by 9 wickets
ODI 707	16 January	India	Mohammad Azharuddin	West Indies	Richie Richardson	Melbourne Cricket Ground, Melbourne	India by 5 wickets
Finals
No.	Date	Team 1	Captain 1	Team 2	Captain 2	Venue	Result
ODI 709	18 January	Australia	Allan Border	India	Mohammad Azharuddin	Melbourne Cricket Ground, Melbourne	Australia by 88 runs
ODI 711	18 January	Australia	Allan Border	India	Mohammad Azharuddin	Sydney Cricket Ground, Sydney	Australia by 6 runs

=== Sri Lanka in Pakistan ===
Test series
No.	Date	Home captain	Away captain	Venue	Result
Test 1178	12–17 December	Imran Khan	Aravinda de Silva	Jinnah Stadium, Sialkot	Match drawn
Test 1179	20–25 December	Imran Khan	Aravinda de Silva	Jinnah Stadium, Gujranwala	Match drawn
Test 1182	2–7 January	Imran Khan	Aravinda de Silva	Iqbal Stadium, Faisalabad	Pakistan by 3 wickets
ODI series
No.	Date	Home captain	Away captain	Venue	Result
ODI 700	10 January	Imran Khan	Aravinda de Silva	Sports Stadium, Sargodha	Pakistan by 8 wickets
ODI 704	13 January	Imran Khan	Aravinda de Silva	National Stadium, Karachi	Pakistan by 29 runs
ODI 706	15 January	Imran Khan	Aravinda de Silva	Niaz Stadium, Hyderabad	Pakistan by 59 runs
ODI 708	17 January	Imran Khan	Aravinda de Silva	Ibn-e-Qasim Bagh Stadium, Multan	Sri Lanka by 4 wickets
ODI 710	19 January	Imran Khan	Aravinda de Silva	Rawalpindi Cricket Stadium, Rawalpindi	Pakistan by 117 runs

== January ==
=== England in New Zealand ===
ODI series
No.	Date	Home captain	Away captain	Venue	Result
ODI 701	11 January	Martin Crowe	Graham Gooch	Eden Park, Auckland	England by 7 wickets
ODI 712	12 February	Martin Crowe	Graham Gooch	Carisbrook, Dunedin	England by 3 wickets
ODI 713	15 February	Martin Crowe	Alec Stewart	AMI Stadium, Christchurch	England by 71 runs
Test series
No.	Date	Home captain	Away captain	Venue	Result
Test 1183	18–22 January	Martin Crowe	Graham Gooch	AMI Stadium, Christchurch	England by an innings and 4 runs
Test 1185	30 January-3 February	Martin Crowe	Graham Gooch	Eden Park, Auckland	England by 168 runs
Test 1187	6–10 February	Martin Crowe	Graham Gooch	Basin Reserve, Wellington	Match drawn

== February ==
=== 1992 Benson & Hedges World Cup ===
Pos	Team	Pld	W	L	NR	Pts	NRR
1	New Zealand	8	7	1	0	14	0.592
2	England	8	5	2	1	11	0.470
3	South Africa	8	5	3	0	10	0.138
4	Pakistan	8	4	3	1	9	0.166
5	Australia	8	4	4	0	8	0.201
6	West Indies	8	4	4	0	8	0.076
7	India	8	2	5	1	5	0.137
8	Sri Lanka	8	2	5	1	5	−0.686
9	Zimbabwe	8	1	7	0	2	−1.142

Group stage
No.	Date	Team 1	Captain 1	Team 2	Captain 2	Venue	Result
ODI 714	22 February	New Zealand	Martin Crowe	Australia	Allan Border	Eden Park, Auckland	New Zealand by 37 runs
ODI 715	22 February	England	Graham Gooch	India	Mohammad Azharuddin	WACA Ground, Perth	England by 9 runs
ODI 716	23 February	Sri Lanka	Aravinda de Silva	Zimbabwe	David Houghton	Pukekura Park, New Plymouth	Sri Lanka by 3 wickets
ODI 717	23 February	Pakistan	Javed Miandad	West Indies	Richie Richardson	Melbourne Cricket Ground, Melbourne	West Indies by 10 wickets
ODI 718	25 February	New Zealand	Martin Crowe	Sri Lanka	Aravinda de Silva	Seddon Park, Hamilton	New Zealand by 6 wickets
ODI 719	26 February	Australia	Allan Border	South Africa	Kepler Wessels	Sydney Cricket Ground, Sydney	South Africa by 9 wickets
ODI 720	27 February	Pakistan	Imran Khan	Zimbabwe	David Houghton	Bellerive Oval, Hobart	Pakistan by 53 runs
ODI 721	27 February	England	Graham Gooch	West Indies	Richie Richardson	Melbourne Cricket Ground, Melbourne	England by 6 wickets
ODI 722	28 February	India	Mohammad Azharuddin	Sri Lanka	Aravinda de Silva	Harrup Park, Mackay	No result
ODI 723	29 February	New Zealand	Martin Crowe	South Africa	Kepler Wessels	Eden Park, Auckland	New Zealand by 7 wickets
ODI 724	29 February	West Indies	Richie Richardson	Zimbabwe	David Houghton	The Gabba, Brisbane	West Indies by 75 runs
ODI 725	1 March	Australia	Allan Border	India	Mohammad Azharuddin	The Gabba, Brisbane	Australia by 1 run
ODI 726	1 March	England	Graham Gooch	Pakistan	Javed Miandad	Adelaide Oval, Adelaide	No result
ODI 727	2 March	South Africa	Kepler Wessels	Sri Lanka	Aravinda de Silva	Basin Reserve, Wellington	Sri Lanka by 3 wickets
ODI 728	3 March	New Zealand	Martin Crowe	Zimbabwe	David Houghton	McLean Park, Napier	New Zealand by 48 runs
ODI 729	4 March	India	Mohammad Azharuddin	Pakistan	Imran Khan	Sydney Cricket Ground, Sydney	India by 43 runs
ODI 730	5 March	South Africa	Kepler Wessels	West Indies	Richie Richardson	AMI Stadium, Christchurch	South Africa by 64 runs
ODI 731	5 March	Australia	Allan Border	England	Graham Gooch	Sydney Cricket Ground, Sydney	England by 8 wickets
ODI 732	7 March	India	Mohammad Azharuddin	Zimbabwe	David Houghton	Seddon Park, Hamilton	India by 55 runs
ODI 733	7 March	Australia	Allan Border	Sri Lanka	Aravinda de Silva	Adelaide Oval, Adelaide	Australia by 7 wickets
ODI 734	8 March	New Zealand	Martin Crowe	West Indies	Richie Richardson	Eden Park, Auckland	New Zealand by 5 wickets
ODI 735	8 March	Pakistan	Imran Khan	South Africa	Kepler Wessels	The Gabba, Brisbane	South Africa by 20 runs
ODI 736	9 March	England	Graham Gooch	Sri Lanka	Aravinda de Silva	Eastern Oval, Ballarat	England by 106 runs
ODI 737	10 March	India	Mohammad Azharuddin	West Indies	Richie Richardson	Basin Reserve, Wellington	West Indies by 5 wickets
ODI 738	10 March	South Africa	Kepler Wessels	Zimbabwe	David Houghton	Manuka Oval, Canberra	South Africa by 7 wickets
ODI 739	11 March	Australia	Allan Border	Pakistan	Imran Khan	WACA Ground, Perth	Pakistan by 48 runs
ODI 740	12 March	New Zealand	Martin Crowe	India	Mohammad Azharuddin	Carisbrook, Dunedin	New Zealand by 4 wickets
ODI 741	12 March	England	Alec Stewart	South Africa	Kepler Wessels	Melbourne Cricket Ground, Melbourne	England by 3 wickets
ODI 742	10 March	Sri Lanka	Aravinda de Silva	West Indies	Richie Richardson	Berri Oval, Berri	West Indies by 91 runs
ODI 743	14 March	Australia	Allan Border	Zimbabwe	David Houghton	Bellerive Oval, Hobart	Australia by 128 runs
ODI 744	15 March	New Zealand	Martin Crowe	England	Alec Stewart	Basin Reserve, Wellington	New Zealand by 7 wickets
ODI 745	15 March	India	Mohammad Azharuddin	South Africa	Kepler Wessels	Adelaide Oval, Adelaide	South Africa by 6 wickets
ODI 746	15 March	Pakistan	Imran Khan	Sri Lanka	Aravinda de Silva	WACA Ground, Perth	Pakistan by 4 wickets
ODI 747	15 March	New Zealand	Martin Crowe	Pakistan	Imran Khan	AMI Stadium, Christchurch	Pakistan by 7 wickets
ODI 748	18 March	England	Graham Gooch	Zimbabwe	David Houghton	Lavington Sports Oval, Albury	Zimbabwe by 9 runs
ODI 749	18 March	Australia	Allan Border	West Indies	Richie Richardson	Melbourne Cricket Ground, Melbourne	Australia by 57 runs
Semi-Finals
No.	Date	Team 1	Captain 1	Team 2	Captain 2	Venue	Result
ODI 750	21 March	New Zealand	Martin Crowe	Pakistan	Imran Khan	Eden Park, Auckland	Pakistan by 4 wickets
ODI 751	22 March	England	Graham Gooch	South Africa	Kepler Wessels	Sydney Cricket Ground, Sydney	England by 19 runs
Final
No.	Date	Team 1	Captain 1	Team 2	Captain 2	Venue	Result
ODI 752	25 March	England	Graham Gooch	Pakistan	Imran Khan	Melbourne Cricket Ground, Melbourne	Pakistan won by 22 runs

== April ==
=== South Africa in the West Indies ===
ODI series
No.	Date	Home captain	Away captain	Venue	Result
ODI 753	7 April	Richie Richardson	Kepler Wessels	Sabina Park, Kingston	West Indies by 107 runs
ODI 754	11 April	Richie Richardson	Kepler Wessels	Queen's Park Oval, Port of Spain	West Indies by 10 wickets
ODI 755	12 April	Richie Richardson	Kepler Wessels	Queen's Park Oval, Port of Spain	West Indies by 7 wickets
One-off Test Series
No.	Date	Home captain	Away captain	Venue	Result
Test 1188	18–23 April	Richie Richardson	Kepler Wessels	Kensington Oval, Bridgetown	West Indies by 52 runs
