= International cricket in 1992–93 =

International cricket season

The 1992–1993 international cricket season was from September 1992 to April 1993.

== Season overview ==
International tours
Start date	Home team	Away team	Results [Matches]			
Start date	Home team	Away team	Test	ODI	FC	LA
18 October 1992	Zimbabwe	India	0–0 [1]	0–1 [1]	—	—
31 October 1992	Zimbabwe	New Zealand	0–1 [2]	0–2 [2]	—	—
13 November 1992	South Africa	India	1–0 [4]	5–2 [7]	—	—
27 November 1992	Sri Lanka	New Zealand	1–0 [2]	2–0 [3]	—	—
27 November 1992	Australia	West Indies	1–2 [5]	—	—	—
26 December 1992	New Zealand	Pakistan	0–1 [1]	2–1 [3]	—	—
16 January 1993	India	England	3–0 [3]	3–3 [7]	—	—
25 February 1993	New Zealand	Australia	1–1 [3]	2–3 [5]	—	—
2 March 1993	Zimbabwe	Pakistan	—	0–1 [1]	—	—
10 March 1993	Sri Lanka	England	1–0 [1]	2–0 [2]	—	—
13 March 1993	India	Zimbabwe	1–0 [1]	3–0 [3]	—	—
23 March 1992	West Indies	Pakistan	2–0 [3]	2–2 [5]	—	—
International tournaments
Start date	Tournament				Winners	
4 December 1992	(Australia) 1992-93 Benson & Hedges World Series				West Indies	
1 February 1993	(United Arab Emirates) 1992–93 Wills Trophy				Pakistan	
9 February 1993	(South Africa) 1992–93 Total International Series				West Indies	

== October ==
=== India in Zimbabwe ===
One-off Test series
No.	Date	Home captain	Away captain	Venue	Result
Test 1197	18–22 October	David Houghton	Mohammad Azharuddin	Harare Sports Club, Harare	Match drawn
One-off ODI series
No.	Date	Home captain	Away captain	Venue	Result
ODI 764	30 October	David Houghton	Mohammad Azharuddin	Harare Sports Club, Harare	India by 30 runs

=== New Zealand in Zimbabwe ===
ODI series
No.	Date	Home captain	Away captain	Venue	Result
ODI 765	31 October	David Houghton	Martin Crowe	Bulawayo Athletic Club, Bulawayo	New Zealand by 22 runs
ODI 766	8 November	David Houghton	Martin Crowe	Harare Sports Club, Harare	New Zealand by 4 wickets
Test series
No.	Date	Home captain	Away captain	Venue	Result
Test 1198	1–5 November	David Houghton	Martin Crowe	Bulawayo Athletic Club, Bulawayo	Match drawn
Test 1198	7–12 November	David Houghton	Martin Crowe	Harare Sports Club, Harare	New Zealand by 177 runs

== November ==
=== India in South Africa ===
Test series
No.	Date	Home captain	Away captain	Venue	Result
Test 1200	13–17 November	Kepler Wessels	Mohammad Azharuddin	Kingsmead Cricket Ground, Durban	Match drawn
Test 1201	26–30 November	Kepler Wessels	Mohammad Azharuddin	The Wanderers Stadium, Johannesburg	Match drawn
Test 1206	26–29 December	Kepler Wessels	Mohammad Azharuddin	St George's Park, Port Elizabeth	South Africa by 9 wickets
Test 1209	2–6 January	Kepler Wessels	Mohammad Azharuddin	Newlands Cricket Ground, Cape Town	Match drawn
ODI series
No.	Date	Home captain	Away captain	Venue	Result
ODI 770	7 December	Kepler Wessels	Mohammad Azharuddin	Newlands Cricket Ground, Cape Town	South Africa by 6 wickets
ODI 772	9 December	Kepler Wessels	Mohammad Azharuddin	St George's Park, Port Elizabeth	South Africa by 7 wickets
ODI 774	11 December	Kepler Wessels	Mohammad Azharuddin	SuperSport Park, Centurion	India by 4 wickets
ODI 779	13 December	Kepler Wessels	Mohammad Azharuddin	The Wanderers Stadium, Johannesburg	South Africa by 6 wickets
ODI 781	15 December	Kepler Wessels	Mohammad Azharuddin	Mangaung Oval, Bloemfontein	South Africa by 8 wickets
ODI 783	17 December	Kepler Wessels	Mohammad Azharuddin	Kingsmead Cricket Ground, Durban	South Africa by 39 runs
ODI 784	19 December	Kepler Wessels	Mohammad Azharuddin	Buffalo Park, East London	India by 5 wickets

=== West Indies in Australia ===
Frank Worrell Trophy - Test series
No.	Date	Home captain	Away captain	Venue	Result
Test 1202	27 November-1 December	Allan Border	Richie Richardson	The Gabba, Brisbane	Match drawn
Test 1205	26–30 December	Allan Border	Richie Richardson	Melbourne Cricket Ground, Melbourne	Australia by 139 runs
Test 1208	2–6 January	Allan Border	Richie Richardson	Sydney Cricket Ground, Sydney	Match drawn
Test 1210	23–26 January	Allan Border	Richie Richardson	Adelaide Oval, Adelaide	West Indies by 1 run
Test 1212	30 January-1 February	Allan Border	Richie Richardson	WACA Ground, Perth	West Indies by an innings and 25 runs

=== New Zealand in Sri Lanka ===
Test series
No.	Date	Home captain	Away captain	Venue	Result
Test 1203	27 November-2 December	Arjuna Ranatunga	Martin Crowe	Tyronne Fernando Stadium, Moratuwa	Match drawn
Test 1204	6–9 December	Arjuna Ranatunga	Martin Crowe	Sinhalese Sports Club Ground, Colombo	Sri Lanka by 9 wickets
ODI series
No.	Date	Home captain	Away captain	Venue	Result
ODI 768	4 December	Arjuna Ranatunga	Martin Crowe	R Premadasa Stadium, Colombo	No result
ODI 776	12 December	Arjuna Ranatunga	Andrew Jones	P Sara Oval, Colombo	Sri Lanka by 8 wickets
ODI 778	13 December	Arjuna Ranatunga	Martin Crowe	R Premadasa Stadium, Colombo	Sri Lanka by 31 runs

== December ==
=== 1992-93 Benson & Hedges World Series ===
Pos	Team	P	W	L	NR	T	Points
1	Australia	8	5	2	0	1	11
2	West Indies	8	5	3	0	0	10
3	Pakistan	8	1	6	0	1	3

Group stage
No.	Date	Team 1	Captain 1	Team 2	Captain 2	Venue	Result
ODI 767	4 December	Pakistan	Javed Miandad	West Indies	Richie Richardson	WACA Ground, Perth	Pakistan by 5 wickets
ODI 769	6 December	Australia	Allan Border	West Indies	Richie Richardson	WACA Ground, Perth	West Indies by 9 wickets
ODI 771	8 December	Australia	Mark Taylor	West Indies	Richie Richardson	Sydney Cricket Ground, Sydney	Australia by 14 runs
ODI 773	10 December	Australia	Mark Taylor	Pakistan	Javed Miandad	Bellerive Oval, Hobart	Match tied
ODI 775	12 December	Pakistan	Javed Miandad	West Indies	Richie Richardson	Adelaide Oval, Adelaide	West Indies by 4 runs
ODI 777	13 December	Australia	Mark Taylor	Pakistan	Javed Miandad	Adelaide Oval, Adelaide	Australia by 8 wickets
ODI 780	15 December	Australia	Mark Taylor	West Indies	Richie Richardson	Melbourne Cricket Ground, Melbourne	Australia by 4 runs
ODI 782	17 December	Pakistan	Javed Miandad	West Indies	Richie Richardson	Sydney Cricket Ground, Sydney	West Indies by 133 runs
ODI 788	9 January	Pakistan	Javed Miandad	West Indies	Richie Richardson	The Gabba, Brisbane	West Indies by 133 runs
ODI 789	10 January	Australia	Allan Border	West Indies	Richie Richardson	The Gabba, Brisbane	West Indies by 7 runs
ODI 790	12 January	Australia	Allan Border	Pakistan	Javed Miandad	Melbourne Cricket Ground, Melbourne	Australia by 32 runs
ODI 791	14 January	Australia	Allan Border	Pakistan	Javed Miandad	Sydney Cricket Ground, Sydney	Australia by 23 runs
Finals
No.	Date	Team 1	Captain 1	Team 2	Captain 2	Venue	Result
ODI 792	15 January	Australia	Allan Border	West Indies	Richie Richardson	Sydney Cricket Ground, Sydney	West Indies by 25 runs
ODI 793	18 January	Australia	Allan Border	West Indies	Richie Richardson	Melbourne Cricket Ground, Melbourne	West Indies by 4 wickets

=== Pakistan in New Zealand ===
ODI series
No.	Date	Home captain	Away captain	Venue	Result
ODI 785	26 December	Martin Crowe	Javed Miandad	Basin Reserve, Wellington	Pakistan by 50 runs
ODI 786	28 December	Martin Crowe	Javed Miandad	McLean Park, Napier	New Zealand by 6 wickets
ODI 787	30 December	Martin Crowe	Javed Miandad	Eden Park, Auckland	New Zealand by 6 wickets
One-off Test
No.	Date	Home captain	Away captain	Venue	Result
ODI 1207	2–5 January	Ken Rutherford	Javed Miandad	Seddon Park, Hamilton	Pakistan by 33 runs

== January ==
=== England in India ===
ODI series
No.	Date	Home captain	Away captain	Venue	Result
ODI 792a	16 January	Mohammad Azharuddin	Graham Gooch	Sardar Patel Stadium, Ahmedabad	Match abandoned
ODI 794	18 January	Mohammad Azharuddin	Graham Gooch	Sawai Mansingh Stadium, Jaipur	England by 4 wickets
ODI 795	21 January	Mohammad Azharuddin	Graham Gooch	Sector 16 Stadium, Chandigarh	India by 5 wickets
ODI 809	26 February	Mohammad Azharuddin	Graham Gooch	M Chinnaswamy Stadium, Bangalore	England by 48 runs
ODI 811	1 March	Mohammad Azharuddin	Graham Gooch	Keenan Stadium, Jamshedpur	England by 6 wickets
ODI 813	4 March	Mohammad Azharuddin	Graham Gooch	Captain Roop Singh Stadium, Gwalior	India by 3 wickets
ODI 814	5 March	Mohammad Azharuddin	Graham Gooch	Captain Roop Singh Stadium, Gwalior	India by 8 wickets
Test series
No.	Date	Home captain	Away captain	Venue	Result
Test 1211	29 January-2 February	Mohammad Azharuddin	Graham Gooch	Eden Gardens, Kolkata	India by 8 wickets
Test 1213	11–15 February	Mohammad Azharuddin	Alec Stewart	MA Chidambaram Stadium, Chennai	India by an innings and 22 runs
Test 1214	19–23 February	Mohammad Azharuddin	Graham Gooch	Wankhede Stadium, Mumbai	India by an innings and 15 runs

== February ==
=== 1992–93 Wills Trophy ===
Team	P	W	L	T	RR	Points
Pakistan	2	2	0	0	4.904	4
Sri Lanka	2	1	1	0	5.011	2
Zimbabwe	2	0	2	0	4.828	0

Group stage
No.	Date	Team 1	Captain 1	Team 2	Captain 2	Venue	Result
ODI 796	1 February	Pakistan	Wasim Akram	Zimbabwe	David Houghton	Sharjah Cricket Stadium, Sharjah	Pakistan by 49 runs
ODI 797	2 February	Pakistan	Wasim Akram	Sri Lanka	Arjuna Ranatunga	Sharjah Cricket Stadium, Sharjah	Pakistan by 8 wickets
ODI 798	3 February	Sri Lanka	Arjuna Ranatunga	Zimbabwe	David Houghton	Sharjah Cricket Stadium, Sharjah	Sri Lanka by 30 runs
Final
No.	Date	Team 1	Captain 1	Team 2	Captain 2	Venue	Result
ODI 799	4 February	Pakistan	Wasim Akram	Sri Lanka	Arjuna Ranatunga	Sharjah Cricket Stadium, Sharjah	Pakistan by 114 runs

=== 1992–93 Total International Series ===
Team	P	W	L	T	NR	RR	Points
West Indies	6	4	2	0	0	1.054	8
Pakistan	6	3	3	0	0	-1.028	6
South Africa	6	2	4	0	0	-0.173	4

Group stage
No.	Date	Team 1	Captain 1	Team 2	Captain 2	Venue	Result
ODI 800	9 February	South Africa	Kepler Wessels	Pakistan	Wasim Akram	Kingsmead Cricket Ground, Durban	Pakistan by 10 runs
ODI 801	11 February	South Africa	Kepler Wessels	West Indies	Richie Richardson	St George's Park, Port Elizabeth	South Africa by 6 wickets
ODI 802	13 February	Pakistan	Wasim Akram	West Indies	Richie Richardson	The Wanderers Stadium, Johannesburg	West Indies by 8 wickets
ODI 803	15 February	South Africa	Kepler Wessels	Pakistan	Wasim Akram	Buffalo Park, East London	Pakistan by 9 runs
ODI 804	17 February	South Africa	Kepler Wessels	West Indies	Richie Richardson	Newlands Cricket Ground, Cape Town	South Africa by 4 runs
ODI 805	19 February	Pakistan	Wasim Akram	West Indies	Richie Richardson	Kingsmead Cricket Ground, Durban	West Indies by 8 wickets
ODI 806	21 February	South Africa	Kepler Wessels	Pakistan	Wasim Akram	SuperSport Park, Centurion	Pakistan by 22 runs
ODI 807	23 February	South Africa	Kepler Wessels	West Indies	Richie Richardson	Mangaung Oval, Bloemfontein	West Indies by 9 wickets
ODI 808	25 February	Pakistan	Wasim Akram	West Indies	Richie Richardson	Newlands Cricket Ground, Cape Town	West Indies by 7 wickets
Final
No.	Date	Team 1	Captain 1	Team 2	Captain 2	Venue	Result
ODI 810	27 February	Pakistan	Wasim Akram	West Indies	Richie Richardson	The Wanderers Stadium, Johannesburg	West Indies by 5 wickets

=== Australia in New Zealand ===
Trans-Tasman Trophy - Test series
No.	Date	Home captain	Away captain	Venue	Result
Test 1215	25–28 February	Martin Crowe	Allan Border	AMI Stadium, Christchurch	Australia by an innings and 60 runs
Test 1216	4–8 March	Martin Crowe	Allan Border	Basin Reserve, Wellington	Match drawn
Test 1217	12–16 March	Martin Crowe	Allan Border	Eden Park, Auckland	New Zealand by 5 wickets
ODI series
No.	Date	Home captain	Away captain	Venue	Result
ODI 816	19 March	Martin Crowe	Allan Border	Carisbrook, Dunedin	Australia by 129 runs
ODI 819	21–22 March	Martin Crowe	Mark Taylor	AMI Stadium, Christchurch	Australia by 1 wicket
ODI 822	24 March	Martin Crowe	Allan Border	Basin Reserve, Wellington	New Zealand by 88 runs
ODI 825	27 March	Martin Crowe	Mark Taylor	Seddon Park, Hamilton	New Zealand by 3 wickets
ODI 827	28 March	Martin Crowe	Allan Border	Eden Park, Auckland	Australia by 3 runs

== March ==
=== Pakistan in Zimbabwe ===
One-off ODI series
No.	Date	Home captain	Away captain	Venue	Result
ODI 812	2 March	David Houghton	Wasim Akram	Harare Sports Club, Harare	Pakistan by 3 wickets

=== England in Sri Lanka ===
ODI series
No.	Date	Home captain	Away captain	Venue	Result
ODI 815	10 March	Arjuna Ranatunga	Alec Stewart	R Premadasa Stadium, Colombo	Sri Lanka by 32 runs
ODI 818	20 March	Arjuna Ranatunga	Alec Stewart	Tyronne Fernando Stadium, Moratuwa	Sri Lanka by 8 wickets
One-off Test series
No.	Date	Home captain	Away captain	Venue	Result
Test 1219	13–18 March	Arjuna Ranatunga	Alec Stewart	Sinhalese Sports Club Ground, Colombo	Sri Lanka by 5 wickets

=== Zimbabwe in India ===
One-off Test series
No.	Date	Home captain	Away captain	Venue	Result
Test 1218	13–17 March	Mohammad Azharuddin	David Houghton	Feroz Shah Kotla, Delhi	India by an innings and 13 runs
ODI series
No.	Date	Home captain	Away captain	Venue	Result
ODI 817	19 March	Mohammad Azharuddin	David Houghton	Nahar Singh Stadium, Faridabad	India by 67 runs
ODI 820	22 March	Mohammad Azharuddin	David Houghton	Nehru Stadium, Guwahati	India by 7 wickets
ODI 823	25 March	Mohammad Azharuddin	David Houghton	Nehru Stadium, Pune	India by 8 wickets

=== Pakistan in the West Indies ===
ODI series
No.	Date	Home captain	Away captain	Venue	Result
ODI 821	23 March	Richie Richardson	Wasim Akram	Sabina Park, Kingston	West Indies by 4 wickets
ODI 824	26 March	Richie Richardson	Wasim Akram	Queen's Park Oval, Port of Spain	West Indies by 5 wickets
ODI 826	27 March	Richie Richardson	Wasim Akram	Queen's Park Oval, Port of Spain	Pakistan by 7 wickets
ODI 828	30 March	Richie Richardson	Wasim Akram	Arnos Vale Ground, Kingstown	Pakistan by 38 runs
ODI 829	3 April	Richie Richardson	Wasim Akram	Bourda, Georgetown	Match tied
Test series
No.	Date	Home captain	Away captain	Venue	Result
Test 1220	16–18 April	Richie Richardson	Wasim Akram	Queen's Park Oval, Port of Spain	West Indies by 204 runs
Test 1221	23–27 April	Richie Richardson	Wasim Akram	Kensington Oval, Bridgetown	West Indies by 10 wickets
Test 1222	1–6 May	Richie Richardson	Wasim Akram	Antigua Recreation Ground, St John's	Match drawn
