= International cricket in 1995 =

International cricket season

The 1995 international cricket season was from April 1995 to September 1995.

== Season overview ==
International tours
Start date	Home team	Away team	Results [Matches]			
Start date	Home team	Away team	Test	ODI	FC	LA
24 May 1995	England	West Indies	2–2 [6]	2–1 [3]	—	—

=== West Indies in England ===
ODI series
No.	Date	Home captain	Away captain	Venue	Result
ODI 1000	24–25 May	Michael Atherton	Richie Richardson	Trent Bridge, Nottingham	West Indies by 5 wickets
ODI 1001	26 May	Michael Atherton	Richie Richardson	The Oval, London	England by 25 runs
ODI 1002	28 May	Michael Atherton	Richie Richardson	Lord's, London	England by 73 runs
The Wisden Trophy - Test series
No.	Date	Home captain	Away captain	Venue	Result
Test 1298	8–11 June	Michael Atherton	Richie Richardson	Headingley Cricket Ground, Leeds	West Indies by 9 wickets
Test 1299	22–26 June	Michael Atherton	Richie Richardson	Lord's, London	England by 72 runs
Test 1300	6–8 July	Michael Atherton	Richie Richardson	Edgbaston Cricket Ground, Birmingham	West Indies by an innings and 64 runs
Test 1301	27–30 July	Michael Atherton	Richie Richardson	Old Trafford Cricket Ground, Manchester	England by 6 wickets
Test 1302	10–14 August	Michael Atherton	Richie Richardson	Trent Bridge, Nottingham	Match drawn
Test 1303	24–28 August	Michael Atherton	Richie Richardson	The Oval, London	Match drawn
