= Hathurusingha =

Hathurusingha may refer to:

- Chaminda Hathurusingha (born 1971), Sri Lankan cricketer
- Chandika Hathurusingha (born 1968), Sri Lankan cricketer
