= 1992–93 Wills Trophy =

International cricket tournament

- Date: 1–4 February 1993
- Location: Sharjah, United Arab Emirates
- Result: Won by Pakistan; 1–0 in final series
- Player of the series: Wasim Akram
Teams
Pakistan	Sri Lanka	Zimbabwe
Captains
Wasim Akram	Arjuna Ranatunga	David Houghton
Most runs
Most wickets

The 1992–93 Wills Trophy (named after sponsor Wills of ITC Limited) was a One Day International (ODI) cricket tri-series where the United Arab Emirates played host to Pakistan, Sri Lanka and Zimbabwe. Pakistan and Sri Lanka reached the final, which Pakistan won. India were invited to join the competition, but declined in protest at the umpiring in the 1991–92 competition.

== Points table ==
Team	P	W	L	T	RR	Points
Pakistan	2	2	0	0	4.904	4
Sri Lanka	2	1	1	0	5.011	2
Zimbabwe	2	0	2	0	4.828	0

== Group matches ==
=== First match ===
1 February 1993
Cricinfo report

Pakistan; 262-8 (50 overs)	v	Zimbabwe; 213-6 (50 overs)
Inzamam-ul-Haq 90 (133); Ali Shah 3/33 (10 overs)		Grant Flower 57 (109); Waqar Younis 2/26 (9 overs)

Pakistan won by 49 runs
Sharjah Cricket Stadium, Sharjah, UAE
Umpires: R. V. Ramani (India) and Raman Sharma (India)
Player of the match: Inzamam-ul-Haq (Pakistan)

- West Indies won the toss and chose to field
- Arshad Khan made his debut ODI debut for Pakistan.
- Gavin Briant made his ODI debut for Zimbabwe

=== Second match ===
2 February 1993
Cricinfo report

Sri Lanka; 180-9 (46 overs)	v	Pakistan; 181-2 (40.2 overs)
Asanka Gurusinha 90 (112); Wasim Akram 4/24 (10 overs)		Rameez Raja 73 (104); Aravinda de Silva 2/24 (5 overs)

Pakistan won by 8 wickets
Sharjah Cricket Stadium, Sharjah, UAE
Umpires: R. V. Ramani (India) and Raman Sharma (India)
Player of the match: Wasim Akram (Pakistan)

- Pakistan won the toss and chose to field
- The start of the match was delayed by rain and it was reduced to 46 overs a side

=== Third match ===
3 February 1993
Cricinfo report

Sri Lanka; 266-5 (43 overs)	v	Zimbabwe; 236-9 (43 overs)
Chandika Hathurusingha 66 (91); Eddo Brandes 2/57 (9 overs)		Eddo Brandes 55 (35); Champaka Ramanayake 3/28 (9 overs)

Sri Lanka won by 30 runs
Sharjah Cricket Stadium, Sharjah, UAE
Umpires: R. V. Ramani (India) and Raman Sharma (India)
Player of the match: Eddo Brandes (Zimbabwe)

- Sri Lanka won the toss and chose to bat
- The start of the match was delayed by rain and it was reduced to 43 overs a side
- Nishantha Ranatunga made his ODI debut for Sri Lanka

== Final ==
4 February 1993
(scorecard)

Pakistan; 281/3 (41 overs)	v	Sri Lanka; 167/7 (41 overs)
Saeed Anwar 110 (105); Asanka Gurusinha 2-63 (7 overs)		Chandika Hathurusingha 42 (72); Wasim Akram 4–24 (10 overs)

Pakistan won by 114 runs
Sharjah Cricket Association Stadium
Umpires: R. V. Ramani & Raman Sharma
Player of the match: (Pakistan) Saeed Anwar

- Sri Lanka won the toss and elected to bowl
