= International cricket in 1994 =

International cricket season

The 1994 International cricket season was from May 1994 to September 1994.

== Season overview ==
International tours
Start date	Home team	Away team	Results [Matches]			
Start date	Home team	Away team	Test	ODI	FC	LA
19 May 1994	England	New Zealand	1–0 [2]	1–0 [2]	—	—
21 July 1994	England	South Africa	1–1 [2]	2–0 [2]	—	—
3 August 1994	Sri Lanka	Pakistan	0–2 [3]	1–4 [5]	—	—
International tournaments
Start date	Tournament				Winners	
4 September 1994	(Sri Lanka) 1994 Singer World Series				India	

== May ==
=== New Zealand in England ===
Texaco Trophy - ODI series
No.	Date	Home captain	Away captain	Venue	Result
ODI 913	19 May	Mike Atherton	Ken Rutherford	Edgbaston Cricket Ground, Birmingham	England by 42 runs
ODI 913a	21–22 May	Mike Atherton	Ken Rutherford	Lord's, London	Match abandoned
Test series
No.	Date	Home captain	Away captain	Venue	Result
Test 1260	2–6 June	Mike Atherton	Ken Rutherford	Trent Bridge, Nottingham	England by an innings and 90 runs
Test 1261	16–20 June	Mike Atherton	Ken Rutherford	Lord's, London	Match drawn
Test 1262	30 June-5 July	Mike Atherton	Ken Rutherford	Old Trafford Cricket Ground, Manchester	Match drawn

== July ==
=== South Africa in England ===
Test series
No.	Date	Home captain	Away captain	Venue	Result
Test 1263	21–24 July	Mike Atherton	Kepler Wessels	Lord's, London	South Africa by 356 runs
Test 1264	4–8 August	Mike Atherton	Kepler Wessels	Headingley Cricket Ground, Leeds	Match drawn
Test 1266	18–21 August	Mike Atherton	Kepler Wessels	Kennington Oval, London	England by 8 wickets
Texaco Trophy - ODI series
No.	Date	Home captain	Away captain	Venue	Result
ODI 919	25 August	Mike Atherton	Kepler Wessels	Edgbaston Cricket Ground, Birmingham	England by 6 wickets
ODI 920	27–28 August	Mike Atherton	Kepler Wessels	Old Trafford Cricket Ground, Manchester	England by 4 wickets

== August ==
=== Pakistan in Sri Lanka ===
ODI series
No.	Date	Home captain	Away captain	Venue	Result
ODI 914	3 August	Arjuna Ranatunga	Saleem Malik	R Premadasa Stadium, Colombo	Pakistan by 9 wickets
ODI 915	6 August	Arjuna Ranatunga	Saleem Malik	R Premadasa Stadium, Colombo	Sri Lanka by 7 wickets
ODI 916	7 August	Arjuna Ranatunga	Saleem Malik	Sinhalese Sports Club Ground, Colombo	Pakistan by 19 runs
ODI 917	22 August	Arjuna Ranatunga	Saleem Malik	Sinhalese Sports Club Ground, Colombo	Pakistan by 5 wickets
ODI 918	24 August	Arjuna Ranatunga	Saleem Malik	R Premadasa Stadium, Colombo	Pakistan by 27 runs
Test series
No.	Date	Home captain	Away captain	Venue	Result
Test 1265	9–13 August	Arjuna Ranatunga	Saleem Malik	P Sara Oval, Colombo	Pakistan by 301 runs
Test 1265a	18–23 August	Arjuna Ranatunga	Saleem Malik	Sinhalese Sports Club Ground, Colombo	Match cancelled
Test 1267	26–28 August	Arjuna Ranatunga	Saleem Malik	Asgiriya Stadium, Kandy	Pakistan by an innings and 52 runs

== September ==
=== 1994 Singer World Series ===
Team	P	W	L	T	NR	RR	Points
Sri Lanka	3	3	0	0	0		6
India	3	1	1	0	1		3
Australia	3	1	2	0	0		2
Pakistan	3	0	2	0	1		1

Group stage
No.	Date	Team 1	Captain 1	Team 2	Captain 2	Venue	Result
ODI 921	4 September	Sri Lanka	Arjuna Ranatunga	India	Mohammad Azharuddin	R Premadasa Stadium, Colombo	No result
ODI 922	5 September	Sri Lanka	Arjuna Ranatunga	India	Mohammad Azharuddin	R Premadasa Stadium, Colombo	Sri Lanka by 7 wickets
ODI 923	7 September	Australia	Mark Taylor	Pakistan	Saleem Malik	Sinhalese Sports Club Ground, Colombo	Australia by 28 runs
ODI 924	7 September	Australia	Mark Taylor	India	Mohammad Azharuddin	R Premadasa Stadium, Colombo	India by 31 runs
ODI 925	11 September	Sri Lanka	Arjuna Ranatunga	Pakistan	Saleem Malik	Sinhalese Sports Club Ground, Colombo	Sri Lanka by 7 wickets
ODI 926	13 September	Sri Lanka	Arjuna Ranatunga	Australia	Mark Taylor	P Sara Oval, Colombo	Sri Lanka by 6 wickets
ODI 926a	15–16 September	India	Mohammad Azharuddin	Pakistan	Saleem Malik	R Premadasa Stadium, Colombo	Match abandoned
Final
No.	Date	Team 1	Captain 1	Team 2	Captain 2	Venue	Result
ODI 927	17 September	Sri Lanka	Arjuna Ranatunga	India	Mohammad Azharuddin	Sinhalese Sports Club Ground, Colombo	India by 6 wickets
