= 1991–92 Wills Trophy =

International cricket tournament

- Date: 17–25 October 1991
- Location: Sharjah, United Arab Emirates
- Result: Pakistan def. India in final
- Player of the series: Sanjay Manjrekar (India)
Teams
India	Pakistan	West Indies
Captains
Most runs
Most wickets

The 1991–92 Wills Trophy (named after sponsor Wills of ITC Limited) was a triangular one-day international cricket tournament held at Sharjah between 17 October and 25 October 1991. It involved the national cricket teams of Pakistan, West Indies and India. Pakistan won the tournament after beating India in the final on 25 October.

== Group stage ==
Pre-tournament favourites Pakistan won despite losing their first two matches and their position looked helpless until the West Indies failed to score two runs off three balls in the third.

=== 1st ODI ===
17 October

Pakistan; 215 (48.3 overs)	v	West Indies; 217-9 (47.3 overs)
Rameez Raja 49 (101); Carl Hooper 2/33 (10 overs)		Richie Richardson 106 (142); Waqar Younis 4/48 (9 overs)

West Indies won by 1 wicket
Sharjah Cricket Stadium, Sharjah, UAE
Umpires: B.C. Cooray (Sri Lanka) and P. W. Vidanagamage (Sri Lanka)
Player of the match: Richie Richardson (West Indies)

- West Indies won the toss and chose to field

=== 2nd ODI ===
18 October

India; 238-4 (50 overs)	v	Pakistan; 178 (44.4 overs)
Sanjay Manjrekar 72 (93); Waqar Younis 2/65 (10 overs)		Javed Miandad 61 (94); Manoj Prabhakar 4/25 (7.4 overs)

India won by 60 runs
Sharjah Cricket Stadium, Sharjah, UAE
Umpires: P. W. Vidanagamage (Sri Lanka) and Udaya Wickramasinghe (Sri Lanka)
Player of the match: Sanjay Manjrekar (India)

- India won the toss and chose to bat

Vinod Kambli and Javagal Srinath made their ODI debuts for India.

=== 3rd ODI ===
19 October

India; 240-6 (50 overs)	v	West Indies; 221 (48.5 overs)
Navjot Singh Sidhu 98 (113); Carl Hooper 2/46 (10 overs)		Clayton Lambert 66 (89); Manoj Prabhakar 4/30 (9.5 overs)

India won by 19 runs
Sharjah Cricket Stadium, Sharjah, UAE
Umpires: B. C. Cooray (Sri Lanka) and Udaya Wickramasinghe (Sri Lanka)
Player of the match: Manoj Prabhakar (India)

- West Indies won the toss and chose to field

=== 4th ODI ===
21 October

Pakistan; 236-7 (50 overs)	v	West Indies; 235 (50 overs)
Rameez Raja 90 (129); Curtly Ambrose 5/53 (10 overs)		Richie Richardson 122 (121); Waqar Younis 4/39 (9.5 overs)

Pakistan won by 1 run
Sharjah Cricket Stadium, Sharjah, UAE
Umpires: B. C. Cooray (Sri Lanka) and P. W. Vidanagamage (Sri Lanka)
Player of the match: Richie Richardson (West Indies)

- Pakistan won the toss and chose to bat

=== 5th ODI ===
22 October

West Indies; 145 (46.2 overs)	v	India; 147-3 (37.3 overs)
Keith Arthurton 59 (83); Sachin Tendulkar 4/34 (10 overs)		Navjot Singh Sidhu 44 (99); Ian Bishop 2/28 (7 overs)

India won by 7 wickets
Sharjah Cricket Stadium, Sharjah, UAE
Umpires: P. W. Vidanagamage (Sri Lanka) and Udaya Wickramasinghe (Sri Lanka)
Player of the match: Sachin Tendulkar (India)

- India won the toss and chose to field

• Jeff Dujon played his last ODI game.

=== 6th ODI ===
23 October

Pakistan; 257-7 (50 overs)	v	India; 253-6 (50 overs)
Aamer Sohail 91 (133); Javagal Srinath 2/55 (8 overs)		Ravi Shastri 77 (99); Wasim Akram 2/44 (9 overs)

Pakistan won by 4 runs
Sharjah Cricket Stadium, Sharjah, UAE
Umpires: B. C. Cooray (Sri Lanka) and Udaya Wickramasinghe (Sri Lanka)
Player of the match: Aamer Sohail (Pakistan)

- India won the toss and chose to field

== Final ==
25 October

Pakistan; 262-6 (50 overs)	v	India; 190 (46 overs)
Zahid Fazal 98 (119); Kapil Dev 3/36 (10 overs)		Sanjay Manjrekar 52 (69); Aaqib Javed 7/37 (10 overs)

Pakistan won by 72 runs
Sharjah Cricket Stadium, Sharjah, UAE
Umpires: B. C. Cooray (Sri Lanka) and Udaya Wickramasinghe (Sri Lanka)
Player of the match: Aaqib Javed (Pakistan)

- India won the toss and chose to field

Sanjay Manjrekar of India won the Player of the Series Award
