= 1996–97 Australia Tri-Nation Series =

International cricket tournament

1996–97 Carlton and United Series
- Date: 6 December 1996 – 20 January 1997
- Location: Australia
- Result: Won by Pakistan; 2–0 in final series
Teams
Australia	Pakistan	West Indies
Captains
Mark Taylor	Wasim Akram	Courtney Walsh
Most runs
Mark Waugh (358)	Ijaz Ahmed (395)	Brian Lara (424)
Most wickets
Shane Warne (19)	Saqlain Mushtaq (17)	Courtney Walsh (10)

The 1996–97 Australia Tri-Nation Series (more commonly known as the 1996–97 Carlton and United Series) was a One Day International (ODI) cricket tri-series where Australia played host to Pakistan and West Indies. Australia missed the finals for the first time since the 1979/80 season. Pakistan and West Indies reached the Finals, which Pakistan won 2–0, with West Indies finishing as runners up for the first time.

== Uniforms ==
Australia
Australia kit

Pakistan
Pakistan kit

West Indies
West Indies kit

== Squads ==
Australia	Pakistan	West Indies
Mark Taylor (c); Michael Bevan; Ian Healy; Andy Bichel; Greg Blewett; Jason Gillespie; Stuart Law; Darren Lehmann; Glenn McGrath; Tom Moody; Ricky Ponting; Paul Reiffel; Anthony Stuart; Shane Warne; Mark Waugh; Steve Waugh	Wasim Akram (c); Aamir Sohail; Ijaz Ahmed; Inzamam-ul-haq; Mohammad Wasim; Mohammad Zahid; Moin Khan; Mushtaq Ahmed; Saeed Anwar; Salim Malik; Saqlain Mushtaq; Shahid Afridi; Shahid Nazir; Waqar Younis; Zahoor Elahi	Courtney Walsh (c); Jimmy Adams; Curtly Ambrose; Kenny Benjamin; Ian Bishop; Courtney Browne; Sherwin Campbell; Shivnarine Chanderpaul; Cameron Cuffy; Adrian Griffith; Roland Holder; Carl Hooper; Nixon McLean; Junior Murray; Brian Lara; Robert Samuels; Phil Simmons; Patterson Thompson

== Points table ==
Pos	Team	P	W	L	NR	T	Points	NRR
1	West Indies	8	5	3	0	0	10	−0.003
2	Pakistan	8	4	4	0	0	8	+0.109
3	Australia	8	3	5	0	0	6	−0.103

== Result summary ==
6 December 1996 (D/N)
Scorecard

West Indies; 172 (49.2 overs)	v	Australia; 173/5 (48.4 overs)
S Chanderpaul 54 (100); TM Moody 2/25 (10 overs)		GS Blewett 57* (90); CL Hooper 2/27 (10 overs)

Australia won by 5 wickets
Melbourne Cricket Ground, Melbourne
Umpires: PD Parker and SG Randell
Player of the match: GS Blewett (AUS)

- West Indies won the toss and elected to bat
- RG Samuels and NAM McLean (both WI) made their ODI debuts

8 December 1996 (D/N)
Scorecard

West Indies; 161 (48.3 overs)	v	Australia; 162/2 (42 overs)
CL Hooper 41 (58); SK Warne 5/33 (9.3 overs)		ME Waugh 83* (135); CEL Ambrose 1/27 (8 overs)

Australia won by 8 wickets
Sydney Cricket Ground, Sydney
Umpires: DB Hair and TA Prue
Player of the match: SK Warne (AUS)

- West Indies won the toss and elected to bat
- AFG Griffith (WI) made his ODI debut.

15 December 1996
Scorecard

Pakistan; 223 (49.5 overs)	v	Australia; 211 (47.5 overs)
Aamer Sohail 67 (96); SK Warne 4/52 (9.5 overs)		SR Waugh 57 (78); Saqlain Mushtaq 5/29 (8.5 overs)

Pakistan won by 12 runs
Adelaide Oval, Adelaide
Umpires: RA Emerson and DJ Harper
Player of the match: Saqlain Mushtaq (PAK)

- Pakistan won the toss and elected to bat

17 December 1996
Scorecard

Pakistan; 176 (48.4 overs)	v	West Indies; 177/3 (36.1 overs)
Zahoor Elahi 51 (81); JC Adams 5/37 (10 overs)		JR Murray 86 (78); Shahid Afridi 2/31 (8.1 overs)

West Indies won by 7 wickets
Adelaide Oval, Adelaide
Umpires: DJ Harper and TA Prue
Player of the match: JR Murray (WI)

- West Indies won the toss and elected to field

1 January 1997 (D/N)
Scorecard

Australia; 199 (47.1 overs)	v	Pakistan; 203/6 (45.3 overs)
SR Waugh 42 (55); Saqlain Mushtaq 3/23 (7.1 overs)		Ijaz Ahmed 58 (83); SK Warne 4/37 (10 overs)

Pakistan won by 4 wickets
Sydney Cricket Ground, Sydney
Umpires: RA Emerson and SG Randell
Player of the match: SK Warne (AUS)

- Australia won the toss and elected to bat

3 January 1997 (D/N)
Scorecard

Pakistan; 197 (49.5 overs)	v	West Indies; 198/4 (48.1 overs)
Ijaz Ahmed 59 (122); IR Bishop 4/38 (9.5 overs)		CL Hooper 54* (84); Mohammad Zahid 1/29 (10 overs)

West Indies won by 6 wickets
Brisbane Cricket Ground, Woolloongabba, Brisbane
Umpires: RA Emerson and DJ Harper
Player of the match: CL Hooper (WI)

- West Indies won the toss and elected to field

5 January 1997 (D/N)
Scorecard

Australia; 281/4 (50 overs)	v	West Indies; 284/3 (48.5 overs)
ME Waugh 102 (114); NAM McLean 1/23 (6 overs)		CL Hooper 110* (109); AM Stuart 2/48 (10 overs)

West Indies won by 7 wickets
Brisbane Cricket Ground, Woolloongabba, Brisbane
Umpires: PD Parker and SG Randell
Player of the match: CL Hooper (WI)

- Australia won the toss and elected to bat
- AJ Bichel and AM Stuart (both AUS) made their ODI debuts

7 January 1997
Scorecard

Pakistan; 149 (45.2 overs)	v	Australia; 120 (41.3 overs)
Mohammad Wasim 54 (94); AJ Bichel 3/17 (10 overs)		Extras 28; MG Bevan 24 (83); Wasim Akram 3/13 (8 overs)

Pakistan won by 29 runs
Bellerive Oval, Hobart
Umpires: TA Prue and SG Randell
Player of the match: Mohammad Wasim (PAK)

- Pakistan won the toss and elected to bat
- Mujahid Jamshed (PAK) made his ODI debut

10 January 1997 (D/N)
Scorecard

Pakistan; 257/7 (50 overs)	v	West Indies; 258/5 (48.4 overs)
Ijaz Ahmed 94 (81); CA Walsh 2/38 (10 overs)		BC Lara 103* (116); Ijaz Ahmed jnr 1/9 (2 overs)

West Indies won by 5 wickets
WACA Ground, Perth
Umpires: RA Emerson and DJ Harper
Player of the match: BC Lara (WI)

- West Indies won the toss and elected to field
- Ijaz Ahmed jnr (PAK) and PIC Thompson (WI) made their ODI debuts

12 January 1997
Scorecard

Australia; 267/7 (50 overs)	v	West Indies; 269/6 (49.2 overs)
ME Waugh 92 (125); S Chanderpaul 2/16 (4 overs)		BC Lara 90 (110); SK Warne 2/46 (10 overs); TM Moody 2/46 (6 overs)

West Indies won by 4 wickets
WACA Ground, Perth
Umpires: DB Hair and TA Prue
Player of the match: BC Lara (WI)

- Australia won the toss and elected to bat

14 January 1997 (D/N)
Scorecard

West Indies; 181 (47.3 overs)	v	Pakistan; 183/2 (39.2 overs)
S Chanderpaul 72 (105); Saqlain Mushtaq 4/17 (9 overs)		Aamer Sohail 55 (92); JC Adams 1/30 (8 overs)

Pakistan won by 8 wickets
Sydney Cricket Ground, Sydney
Umpires: PD Parker and SG Randell
Player of the match: Saqlain Mushtaq (PAK)

- Pakistan won the toss and elected to field

16 January 1997 (D/N)
Scorecard

Pakistan; 181/9 (50 overs)	v	Australia; 182/7 (49.3 overs)
Inzamam-ul-Haq 64 (114); AM Stuart 5/26 (10 overs)		MG Bevan 79* (142); Wasim Akram 4/25 (10 overs)

Australia won by 3 wickets
Melbourne Cricket Ground, Melbourne
Umpires: DB Hair and PD Parker
Player of the match: AM Stuart (AUS)

- Pakistan won the toss and elected to bat
- AM Stuart took a hat-trick in the Pakistan innings (Ijaz Ahmed, Mohammad Wasim, Moin Khan)

== Final series ==
Pakistan won the best of three final series against West Indies 2–0.

18 January 1997 (D/N)
Scorecard

West Indies; 179/9 (50 overs)	v	Pakistan; 185/6 (38.2 overs)
SL Campbell 52 (89); Waqar Younis 4/43 (10 overs)		Ijaz Ahmed 60 (71); CA Walsh 2/29 (10 overs)

Pakistan won by 4 wickets
Sydney Cricket Ground, Sydney
Umpires: DB Hair and SG Randell

- Pakistan won the toss and elected to field

20 January 1997 (D/N)
Scorecard

Pakistan; 165 (48.3 overs)	v	West Indies; 103 (40.3 overs)
Ijaz Ahmed 45 (81); CEL Ambrose 2/17 (9.3 overs)		CEL Ambrose 31* (71); Shahid Nazir 3/14 (10 overs)

Pakistan won by 62 runs
Melbourne Cricket Ground, Melbourne
Umpires: PD Parker and SG Randell

- Pakistan won the toss and elected to bat
- A power failure during the second innings disrupted the game
