= Kapila Wijegunawardene =

Sri Lankan cricketer (born 1964)

Personal information
- Full name: Kapila Indaka Weerakkody Wijegunawardene
- Born: 23 November 1964 (age 61); Colombo, Sri Lanka
- Batting: Right-handed
- Bowling: Right-arm fast-medium
- Role: Bowler

International information
- National side: Sri Lanka (1988–1992)
- Test debut (cap 50): 22 August 1991 v England
- Last Test: 2 January 1992 v Pakistan
- ODI debut (cap 55): 27 October 1988 v Pakistan
- Last ODI: 15 March 1992 v Pakistan

Domestic team information
- Years: Team
- 1988/89–1991/92: Colombo Cricket Club

Career statistics
Competition	Test	ODI	FC	LA
Matches	2	26	51	35
Runs scored	14	20	374	74
Batting average	4.66	2.85	11.68	4.93
100s/50s	0/0	0/0	0/0	0/0
Top score	6*	8*	34	27
Balls bowled	364	1,186	6,885	1,618
Wickets	7	25	158	32
Bowling average	21.00	39.44	24.18	41.31
5 wickets in innings	0	0	7	0
10 wickets in match	0	0	1	0
Best bowling	4/51	4/49	7/28	4/49
Catches/stumpings	0/–	3/–	22/–	9/–
- Source: Cricinfo, 21 July 2012

Kapila Indaka Weerakkody Wijegunawardene (born 23 November 1964) is a former Sri Lankan cricketer who played in two Test matches and 26 One Day Internationals from 1988 to 1992.

In his second Test match, he claimed 7 wickets in the match. He recorded his best bowling figures in an innings by claiming 4 wickets including Imran Khan, Javed Miandad, and Saleem Malik in this match.

Kapila received the opportunity to represent Sri Lanka in 1992 Cricket World Cup. He went wicket-less in the two outings he got against Zimbabwe and Pakistan.

He represented Colombo Cricket Club in domestic cricket and at international level, the selectors always considered him as a limited-over player.

Later, Kapila worked as the chairman of the selectors for Sri Lanka men's national team.
