= Robert Saunders =

Robert, Rob, or Bob Saunders may refer to:

- Robert Saunders (Irish lawyer) (c. 1650–1708), Serjeant-at-law
- Robert Saunders Jr. (1805–1868), American academic and politician
- Robert A. Saunders, American geopolitician
- Robert Alan Saunders (1938-2024), American computer scientist
- Robert Hood Saunders (1903–1955), mayor of Toronto
- Robert W. Saunders Sr. (1966–2003), African-American civil rights activist
- Rob Saunders (born 1968), Irish rugby union player
- Bob Saunders (American football) (born 1976), American football coach
- Bob Saunders (baseball) (1902–1983), baseball pitcher in the Negro leagues
- Bob Saunders (politician) (1929–2016), American politician
