= Dulip Liyanage =

Sri Lankan cricketer (born 1972)

Personal information
- Full name: Dulip Kapila Liyanage
- Born: 6 June 1972 (age 54); Kalutara, Sri Lanka
- Batting: Left-handed
- Bowling: Right-arm fast-medium

International information
- National side: Sri Lanka (1992–2001)
- Test debut (cap 53): 2 September 1992 v Australia
- Last Test: 29 August 2001 v India
- ODI debut (cap 67): 4 December 1992 v New Zealand
- Last ODI: 30 October 2001 v Zimbabwe

Career statistics
Competition	Test	ODI
Matches	9	16
Runs scored	69	144
Batting average	7.66	16.00
100s/50s	0/0	0/0
Top score	23	43
Balls bowled	1,355	642
Wickets	17	10
Bowling average	39.17	51.00
5 wickets in innings	0	0
10 wickets in match	0	0
Best bowling	4/56	3/49
Catches/stumpings	0/–	6/–
- Source: Cricinfo, 9 February 2006

Dulip Kapila Liyanage (born 6 June 1972) is a former Sri Lankan cricketer. He is a left-handed batsman and a right-arm medium-fast bowler. He studied at the Kalutara Vidyalaya.

== International career ==
Liyanage made his Test debut in the same Test as Muttiah Muralitharan in 1992–93, and when bowling, captured the wicket of Tom Moody with his third ball. He went wicketless during the summers against India in 1993–94, and didn't return until 1997. Following this he played in several One-day internationals before injury in Pakistan ruled him out again.

He along with Kumar Dharmasena set the record for the highest 8th wicket stand for Sri Lanka in ODI cricket (91).

== Domestic career ==
Dulip continued to dominate in first class cricket representing Colts Cricket Club in Colombo, Sri Lanka as an attacking All-Rounder, which earned him the opportunity of representing Sri Lanka in Hong Kong International Cricket Sixes tournament(2003) as Captain/Manager. He made his Twenty20 debut on 17 August 2004, for Colts Cricket Club in the 2004 SLC Twenty20 Tournament.
