= Chandika Hathurusingha =

Sri Lankan cricketer and coach

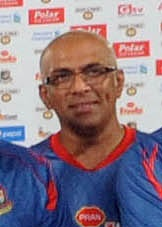
- Chandika in 2015

Personal information
- Full name: Upul Chandika Hathurusingha
- Born: 13 September 1968 (age 58); Colombo, Sri Lanka
- Batting: Right-handed
- Bowling: Right-arm medium-fast
- Relatives: Chaminda Hathurusingha (brother)

International information
- National side: Sri Lanka (1991–1999)
- Test debut (cap 48): 22 February 1991 v New Zealand
- Last Test: 4 March 1999 v Pakistan
- ODI debut (cap 65): 10 January 1992 v Pakistan
- Last ODI: 19 March 1999 v Pakistan

Domestic team information
- Years: Team
- 1989–2005: Tamil Union C&AC
- 1998–2004: Moors SC

Head coaching information
- Years: Team
- 2005–2006: United Arab Emirates
- 2009–2010: Sri Lanka A
- 2011–2013: New South Wales
- 2013/14: Sydney Thunder
- 2014–2017: Bangladesh
- 2017–2019: Sri Lanka
- 2023–2024: Bangladesh

Career statistics
Competition	Test	ODI	FC	LA
Matches	26	35	207	96
Runs scored	1,274	669	10,862	2,203
Batting average	29.62	20.90	36.44	27.88
100s/50s	0/8	0/4	20/61	0/16
Top score	83	66	191	93
Balls bowled	1,962	954	22,359	2,663
Wickets	17	14	425	59
Bowling average	46.41	50.64	22/09	29.69
5 wickets in innings	0	0	12	0
10 wickets in match	0	0	2	0
Best bowling	4/66	4/57	8/29	4/18
Catches/stumpings	11/–	6/8	161/–	27/–
- Source: Cricinfo, 19 May 2014

Upul Chandika Hathurusingha (Sinhala: උපුල් චන්දික හතුරුසිංහ; born 13 September 1968) is a Sri Lankan cricket coach and former player. He represented the Sri Lanka national cricket team from 1991 to 1999 as an all-rounder.

Hathurusingha was born in Colombo and played club cricket for Tamil Union and Moors Sports Club. He played 26 Test and 35 One Day International (ODI) matches for Sri Lanka during his international career. He was a squad member in the 1992 and 1999 Cricket World Cups.

As a coach, Hathurusingha has had head coaching stints with the United Arab Emirates (2005–2006), Bangladesh (2014–2017 and 2023 -2024) and Sri Lanka (2017–2019). He was reappointed head coach of Bangladesh in 2023. He has also coached in Australian domestic cricket with New South Wales and the Sydney Thunder.

== Playing career ==
An opening batsman, Hathurusingha most often opened alongside Roshan Mahanama. A useful pace-bowler, Hathurusingha was not called into the Test side until an injury to Mahanama stopped him from playing. Hathurusingha started his career by piecing together a trio of half-centuries in his first three matches. After a long layoff from the side when other players took over in the opening batsman position, and the subsequent discovery of Sanath Jayasuriya in just that position, Hathurusingha began to play once again, but this time as a strong middle-order batsman and medium-pace bowler. This was not to prove overly effective, though, and when Hathurusingha was not called upon to play in the Cricket World Cup in 1999, this brought about an end to his international career. He played once again in the Premier Tournament and became Player of the Tournament three seasons running (2001–02, 2002–03, 2003–04). His Twenty-20 career began in 2005–06.

== Coaching career ==
Having retired from first-class cricket at the end of the 2004–05 season, and Twenty20 cricket at the end of the following season, Hathurusingha was appointed coach of the United Arab Emirates in December 2005 on a one-year contract. Following the completion of this contract, he was named coach of Sri Lanka A on a three-year contract with Sri Lanka Cricket. In 2009, he was named senior assistant to Sri Lanka's national coach, Trevor Bayliss, but he was fired in June 2010 due to disciplinary reasons, after returning early from a tour of Zimbabwe to attend a coaching course in Australia. Despite a request from Kumar Sangakkara, the national team's captain at the time, for him to be retained in the position, Hathurusingha was not reappointed, and subsequently obtained permanent residency in Australia. He was a coaching consultant for the Canada national cricket team at the 2011 World Cup,

Hathurusingha was appointed assistant coach of New South Wales in September 2011, on a two-year contract. When senior coach Anthony Stuart was dismissed from the position in December 2012, midway through the 2012–13 season, Hathurusingha was named acting coach for the remainder of the season. Trevor Bayliss was appointed coach of New South Wales for the 2013–14 season, with Hathurusingha remaining as senior assistant and also taking over from Shane Duff as coach of the Sydney Thunder in the Big Bash League, as part of a restructure of Cricket NSW's coaching system.

=== Bangladesh: first stint ===
In May 2014, Hathurusingha was named as coach of the Bangladesh national side, replacing Shane Jurgensen, who had resigned following the 2014 ICC World Twenty20. Up to 2017, he is the most successful coach to ever get involved in Bangladesh cricket, with ODI series victories against India, Pakistan and South Africa, and Test victories against Sri Lanka (away), England and Australia. During his tenure, Bangladesh moved higher in Team Rankings and qualified for the 2017 ICC Champions Trophy and directly qualified for 2019 ICC Cricket World Cup as well.

Chandika's record as Bangladesh Coach
	Matches	Won	Lost	Drawn/NR
Test	21	6	11	4
ODI	51	25	23	3
T20I	29	10	19	2

=== Sri Lanka ===
On 9 November 2017, Hathurusingha resigned from coaching the Bangladesh team. On 8 December Sri Lanka Cricket announced that he would be the head coach of the national team. He commenced the role on 20 December 2017, at the beginning of their T20 series against India.

Chandika's record as Sri Lanka Coach
	Matches	Won	Lost	Drawn/NR
Test	21	6	11	4
ODI	44	10	29	5
T20I	12	4	8	0

Updated: 28 June 2019

=== Bangladesh: second stint ===
He was reappointed as head coach of the squad of Bangladesh on 31 January 2023. Although Bangladesh played well in T20Is during this tenure ship, their ODI stint has been disastrous. In his first assignment, Bangladesh whitewashed world T20 champion England for the first time 3–0. Bangladesh also beat Afghanistan in T20 series by 2-0 in August. However, they lost both ODI series and an unremarkable performance in Asia Cup and ICC Cricket World Cup 2023.

On 15 October 2024, Hathurusingha was suspended by the Bangladesh Cricket Board for misconduct following allegations that he had assaulted a member of the national team. He was replaced by Phil Simmons for a tenure lasting until the ICC Champions Trophy in February 2025. He said he had to flee Bangladesh while fearing for his life. He also denied assault allegations.

Chandika's record as Bangladesh Coach
	Matches	Won	Lost	Drawn/NR
Test	11	5	6	0
ODI	35	13	19	3
T20I	29	17	11	1

Sporting positions
Preceded by Abdul Razzaq Kazim	Coach of the United Arab Emirates; December 2005 – September 2006	Succeeded by Abey Kuruvilla
Preceded by Ruwan Kalpage	Coach of Sri Lanka A September 2006 – September 2009	Succeeded by Romesh Kaluwitharana
Preceded by Anthony Stuart	Coach of New South Wales; December 2012 – March 2013	Succeeded by Trevor Bayliss
Preceded by Shane Duff	Coach of Sydney Thunder; April 2013 – May 2014	Succeeded by Vacant
Preceded by Shane Jurgensen	Coach of Bangladesh; May 2014 – November 2017	Succeeded by Steve Rhodes
Preceded by Nic Pothas	Coach of Sri Lanka; December 2017 – August 2019	Succeeded by Rumesh Ratnayake
