= Anthony Stuart (cricketer) =

Australian cricketer (born 1970)

Personal information
- Born: 2 January 1970 (age 56); Newcastle, New South Wales
- Batting: Right-handed
- Bowling: Right-arm fast-medium

International information
- National side: Australia
- ODI debut (cap 131): 5 January 1997 v West Indies
- Last ODI: 16 January 1997 v Pakistan

Domestic team information
- Years: Team
- 1994/95–1998/99: New South Wales
- 1999/00: Canberra Comets

Career statistics
| Competition | ODI | FC | LA |
|---|---|---|---|
| Matches | 3 | 26 | 27 |
| Runs scored | 1 | 204 | 135 |
| Batting average | 1.00 | 8.50 | 9.00 |
| 100s/50s | 0/0 | 0/0 | 0/0 |
| Top score | 1 | 28* | 38 |
| Balls bowled | 180 | 3757 | 1423 |
| Wickets | 8 | 70 | 45 |
| Bowling average | 13.62 | 30.82 | 22.93 |
| 5 wickets in innings | 1 | 2 | 1 |
| 10 wickets in match | 0 | 0 | 0 |
| Best bowling | 5/26 | 7/76 | 5/26 |
| Catches/stumpings | 2/– | 9/– | 3/– |
- Source: Cricinfo, 8 June 2007

Anthony Mark Stuart (born 2 January 1970) is a former Australian international cricketer.

== Domestic career ==
After returning to State cricket, a drop in form saw him leave the New South Wales state squad, moving to the Canberra Comets. A lacklustre 1999–2000 season there coincided with the Comets being dropped from the Mercantile Mutual Cup, after which he returned to grade cricket in Sydney.

== Coaching career ==
He is the former coach of the Wellington Firebirds, a New Zealand provincial team. He is also a former coach of the NSW cricket team in Australia. Stuart is currently the Coaching Development Manager for AFL NSW/ACT.

== International career ==
Stuart played in three One Day Internationals in the 1996–97 Carlton & United One Day triangular series between Australia, Pakistan, and the West Indies, taking eight wickets at an average of 13.62. Despite taking 5–26, including a hat-trick, against Pakistan in the third of these matches in January 1997, Stuart was never selected for Australia again.
