= Ranjith Madurasinghe =

Sri Lankan cricketer (born 1961)

Personal information
- Full name: Madurasinghe Arachchige Wijayasiri Ranjith Madurasinghe
- Born: 30 January 1961 (age 65); Kurunegala, Sri Lanka
- Height: 6 ft 0 in (1.83 m)
- Batting: Left-handed
- Bowling: Right-arm off break
- Role: Bowler

International information
- National side: Sri Lanka (1988–1992)
- Test debut (cap 41): 25 August 1988 v England
- Last Test: 17 August 1992 v Australia
- ODI debut (cap 54): 4 September 1988 v England
- Last ODI: 19 January 1992 v Pakistan

Domestic team information
- Years: Team
- 1991–2000: Kurunegala Youth Cricket Club

Career statistics
Competition	Test	ODI	FC	LA
Matches	3	12	101	27
Runs scored	24	21	1,736	62
Batting average	4.80	10.50	16.37	6.88
100s/50s	0/0	0/0	0/5	0/0
Top score	11	8*	83*	22
Balls bowled	396	480	15,391	1,287+
Wickets	3	5	269	25
Bowling average	57.33	71.60	25.55	35.16
5 wickets in innings	0	0	11	1
10 wickets in match	0	0	2	0
Best bowling	3/60	1/11	7/85	6/29
Catches/stumpings	0/–	3/–	51/–	11/–
- Source: Cricinfo, 1 January 2017

Madurasinghe Arachchige Wijayasiri Ranjith Madurasinghe (born 30 January 1961), or Ranjith Madurasinghe, is a Sri Lankan former cricketer, who played three Test matches and twelve One Day Internationals for Sri Lanka between 1988 and 1992. He was a right-arm off break bowler and a left-handed batsman.

Madurasinghe was educated at Maliyadeva College, Kurunegala, and played domestically for Kurunegala Youth Cricket Club. After retiring, he became a match referee.
