= Richie Richardson =

West Indian cricketer

Sir Richie Richardson, KCN, GCM
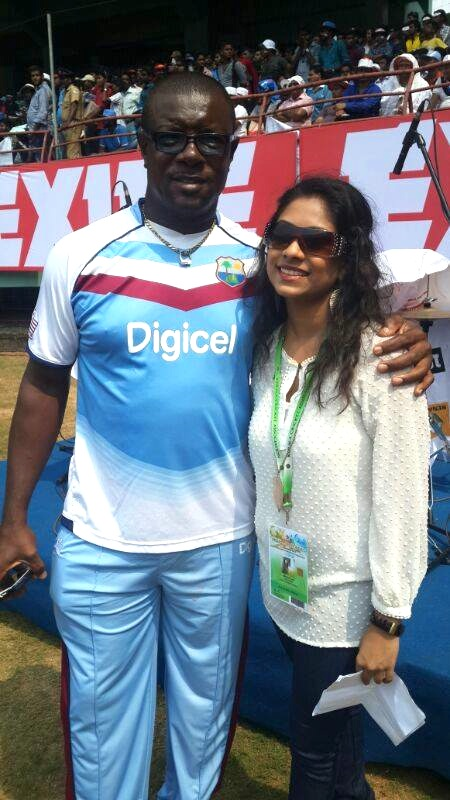
- Richardson (left)

Personal information
- Full name: Sir Richard Benjamin Richardson
- Born: 12 January 1962 (age 64); Five Islands, Saint John, Colony of Antigua and Barbuda
- Height: 183 cm (6 ft 0 in)
- Batting: Right-handed
- Bowling: Right-arm medium
- Role: Batsman

International information
- National side: West Indies (1983-1996)
- Test debut (cap 180): 24 November 1983 v India
- Last Test: 24 August 1995 v England
- ODI debut (cap 41): 17 December 1983 v India
- Last ODI: 14 March 1996 v Australia

Domestic team information
- Years: Team
- 1981–1996: Leeward Islands
- 1993–1994: Yorkshire
- 1996/97: Northern Transvaal
- 1997/98: Windward Islands

Career statistics
Competition	Test	ODI	FC	LA
Matches	86	224	234	313
Runs scored	5,949	6,248	14,618	8,458
Batting average	44.39	33.41	40.71	31.67
100s/50s	16/27	5/44	37/68	6/59
Top score	194	122	194	122
Balls bowled	66	58	914	88
Wickets	0	1	13	2
Bowling average	–	46.00	33.92	42.50
5 wickets in innings	–	0	1	0
10 wickets in match	–	0	0	0
Best bowling	–	1/4	5/40	1/4
Catches/stumpings	90/–	75/–	207/–	94/–
- Source: CricketArchive, 19 October 2010

Sir Richard Benjamin Richardson, KCN GCM (born 12 January 1962) is a former Antiguan international cricketer and a former captain of the West Indies cricket team. He was a flamboyant batsman and superb player of fast bowling. He was named, in 1992, one of Wisden's Cricketers of the Year. Richardson was famous for his wide-brimmed maroon hat which he wore against even the fastest bowlers, though in his later career, he started wearing a helmet instead.

Richardson, who skippered the Leeward Islands, also featured for Yorkshire and Northern Transvaal in his career. Richardson assumed the role, in January 2011, of West Indies' manager for an eventual five year period. Since then he has continually worked as an ICC match referee.

== Early days ==
Richardson was born in Five Islands Village, Antigua. He began his career with the Leewards Islands in 1982 as an opener.

== International career ==
After his second season he was called up by the West Indies to tour India in the 1983–84 season. Richardson joined a successful West Indies Test team captained by Clive Lloyd batting in the middle order. His first tour started inauspiciously when Richardson lost his luggage and was left with few clothes. Veteran fast bowler Andy Roberts felt that Richardson was not getting enough practice as in the nets even bowlers were given a chance to bat ahead of him and by the time Richardson had an opportunity the main bowlers had finished. Roberts went out of his way to bowl at Richardson during the tour to make sure he had some preparation.

On 24 November 1983, Richardson debuted in the fourth match of the six-Test series, at which point the West Indies had a 2–0 lead, replacing Gus Logie who had bagged a pair in the previous Test. In his first innings Richardson too failed to score a run when was the victim of a poor umpiring decision. He was given out leg before wicket off the bowling of off-spinner Shivlal Yadav though he had hit the ball. He was more successful in the second innings, making 26 before he was bowled, and the match ended in a draw.

=== 1985 World Championship of Cricket ===
Australia hosted the World Championship of Cricket in February and March 1985 to commemorate the founding of Victoria. During the group stages the West Indies faced Sri Lanka at the Melbourne Cricket Ground on a pitch with uneven bounce. Though the West Indies won the match, a delivery from Ashantha de Mel reared and hit Richardson in the face; with Larry Gomes, he was one of two West Indian batsmen to retire hurt during the game.

=== Captaincy ===
Late in 1991, West Indies captain Sir Viv Richards informed the West Indies Cricket Board of his intention to relinquish the Test captaincy and retire after the 1992 World Cup. Though Richards had publicly picked Desmond Haynes as his successor, the board chose Richardson to take over the captaincy and Richards was dropped from the team. Richardson supported the board dropping his predecessor, which led to ill-feeling towards him in Antigua, the home of both men. The West Indies never lost a series under Richards' leadership, so there was a great deal of pressure on Richardson. Under his captaincy, Sir Curtly Ambrose and Courtney Walsh led the bowling attack and Brian Lara emerged as a world-class batsman. In the 4 years of his captaincy, the West Indies only lost one series – versus Australia in 1995 which was the West Indies' first series defeat since 1980.

=== Trivia ===
Richardson played 86 Test matches until 1995 scoring 5,949 runs and 16 centuries. He was very successful against Australia, hitting 9 centuries against them, and scored his highest score of 194 against India in Guyana in 1989. He also played 224 One Day Internationals including 3 World Cups. As well he was named, in 1992, one of Wisden's Cricketers of the Year.

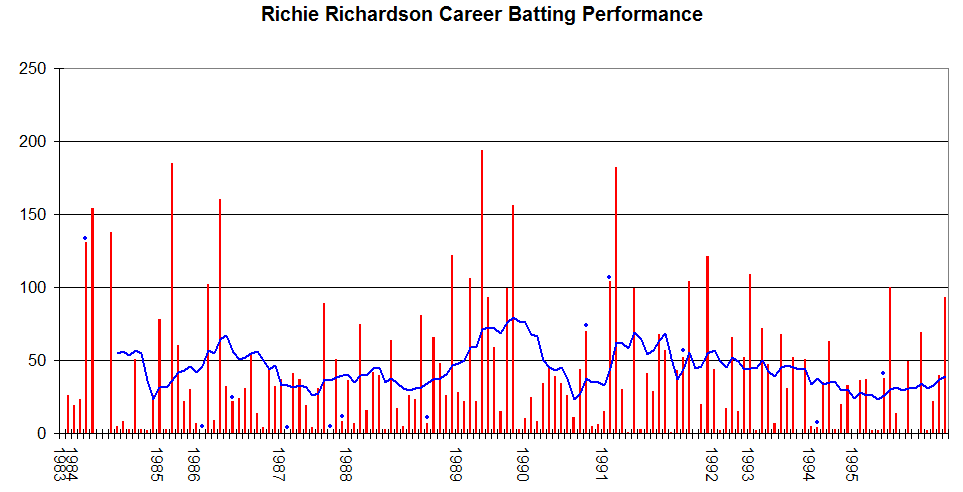
Richie Richardson's career performance graph.

=== Late career ===
Coming into the 1996 World Cup, Richardson was under pressure as captain, and the tournament would prove to be his last in international cricket. In the group stages the West Indies suffered a shock defeat at the hands of Kenya, prompting the Caribbean media to call for Richardson's resignation. Despite the setback, the team progressed to the semi-final where they lost to Australia; it was his last match for the West Indies.

Reflecting on his decision to retire years later, Richardson remarked "I resigned and retired because I was suffering from chronic fatigue syndrome, I was burnt out and it was a struggle to continue playing cricket. Every day was stressful, everybody wanted a piece of you and I had no time for myself. I was training harder and trying hard on the field but I couldn't do what I wanted to do. I felt like I was selling myself and my fans short. They wanted me to continue, but if I had I would have got ill so it was time to move on."

== Domestic career ==
Richardson captained the Leeward Islands, to a Red Stripe Cup title in 1994. As well he skippered to Leewards, in 1993 and 1994, to consecutive Geddes Grant Shield titles. Richardson also played for English County Championship side Yorkshire in both of those said seasons. In 2009 he was signed to Thames Ditton Cricket Club in Surrey.

After his retirement from international cricket, Richardson became the first high-profile signing by the English all-star club cricket team Lashings World XI, also going on to captain the side. In 2006, he smashed a double hundred with included four sixes of a hapless Robert Saunders over. Since 2001 he has also played bass guitar in reggae band Big Bad Dread and The Baldhead, alongside Sir Curtly Ambrose and the band has released several albums.

== Cricket administration ==
He was bestowed, in 2003, with a Grand Cross of the Most Illustrious Order of Merit (GCM) from the State of Antigua and Barbuda. In January 2011, Richardson was appointed the West Indies' team manager, assuming the role until January 2016. He was later awarded a Knight Commander of the Order of the Nation (KCN) by the Antigua and Barbuda government on 28 February 2014. On 8 October 2022, Richardson was bestowed with an honorary Doctor of Laws degree (LLD) from the University of the West Indies.

Richardson was appointed to the Elite Panel of Match Referees by the International Cricket Council (ICC) on 21 September 2015.

== Political career ==
Cheryl Mary Clare Hurst announced on 21 August 2024 that she would be stepping down from the Senate of Antigua and Barbuda for personal reasons. Hurst was scheduled to be replaced by Richardson, who was also originally scheduled to be appointed Minister of Sports, taking the portfolio from Daryll Matthew. However, due to commitments with the International Cricket Council, it was decided that Richardson would serve as the Commissioner of Sports instead on 2 September 2024. On 30 September 2024, a public tribute to Richardson was published by Hon. Daryll Matthew.

Preceded by Viv Richards	West Indies Test cricket captains 1991/92–1995	Succeeded by Courtney Walsh
