= Zahid Fazal =

Pakistani cricketer

Personal information
- Born: 10 October 1973 (age 53); Sialkot, Punjab, Pakistan
- Batting: Right-handed
- Bowling: Right-arm medium Right-arm offbreak

International information
- National side: Pakistan (1990–1995)
- Test debut (cap 118): 15 November 1990 v West Indies
- Last Test: 22 September 1995 v Sri Lanka
- ODI debut (cap 78): 6 November 1990 v New Zealand
- Last ODI: 11 September 1994 v Sri Lanka

Career statistics
Competition	Test	ODI	FC	LA
Matches	9	19	122	129
Runs scored	288	348	5,730	3,424
Batting average	18.00	23.19	34.72	33.56
100s/50s	0/1	0/2	12/27	3/24
Top score	78	98*	201*	116
Balls bowled	–	–	217	58
Wickets	–	–	1	2
Bowling average	–	–	168.00	22.50
5 wickets in innings	–	–	0	0
10 wickets in match	–	–	0	0
Best bowling	–	–	1/24	1/0
Catches/stumpings	5/–	2/–	104/–	104/–
Medal record
Men's Cricket
Representing Pakistan
ICC Cricket World Cup
Winner	1992 Australia and New Zealand
- Source: ESPNcricinfo, 24 January 2017

Zahid Fazal (born November 10, 1973) is a former Pakistani cricketer who played in 9 Tests and 19 ODIs from 1990 to 1995. A right-handed batsman, he made his first-class debut in February 1990 for Pakistan Automobiles Corporation, scoring a half-century in his only innings. He made his international debut nine months later, playing in the third ODI against the touring New Zealand side. His highest ODI score is 98* (retired hurt) against India at Sharjah on 25 October 1991 in the final of the Wills Trophy. He also played in the 1992 Cricket World Cup where Pakistan emerged as the winner.

His final international match was the third Test against Sri Lanka in September 1995, when he scored 23 and 1. He completed his international career with a Test batting average of 18.00, and an ODI average of 23.20. He continued to play domestic cricket until 2004, and retired with first-class and List A batting averages in excess of 30.
