= Akram Raza =

Pakistani cricketer (born 1964)

Personal information
- Full name: Mohammad Akram Raza
- Born: 29 November 1964 (age 61); Lahore, Pakistan
- Batting: Right-handed
- Bowling: Right-arm off spin
- Role: Bowler

International information
- National side: Pakistan (1989–1995)
- Test debut (cap 114): 1 December 1989 v India
- Last Test: 31 January 1995 v Zimbabwe
- ODI debut (cap 73): 23 October 1989 v Australia
- Last ODI: 26 February 1995 v Zimbabwe

Domestic team information
- Years: Team
- 1981–1986: Lahore City
- 1984–1985: Water and Power Development Authority
- 1986–2004: Habib Bank
- 1988–2001: Sargodha
- 1996–1998: Faisalabad

Umpiring information
- FC umpired: 23 (2009–2011)
- LA umpired: 14 (2008–2011)

Career statistics
Competition	Test	ODI	FC	LA
Matches	9	49	215	185
Runs scored	153	193	5,971	1,048
Batting average	15.30	17.54	26.42	15.87
100s/50s	0/0	0/0	3	0/2
Top score	32	33*	28	52*
Balls bowled	1,526	2,601	39,004	9,301
Wickets	13	38	657	199
Bowling average	56.30	42.39	25.58	29.07
5 wickets in innings	0	0	32	1
10 wickets in match	0	0	3	0
Best bowling	3/46	3/18	7/65	5/27
Catches/stumpings	8/–	19/–	176/–	88/–
- Source: CricketArchive, 25 January 2017

Mohammad Akram Raza (Urdu: محمد اکرم رضا) (born 1964) is a former Pakistani cricketer who played in nine Test matches and 49 One Day Internationals from 1989 to 1995.

== Playing career ==
Born 29 November 1964 at Lahore, Punjab, Raza began his domestic cricket career for Lahore City at the age of 16.

In 1989 he made his international debut for Pakistan in a one-day international match against Australia. He made his final appearance for Pakistan in February 1995 having played in nine Tests and 49 one day internationals.

Raza was named in a 2000 corruption report by Justice Malik Mohammad Qayyum resulting in a fine from the Pakistan Cricket Board.

== Umpiring career ==
After retiring from playing Raza took up umpiring, reaching domestic level in 2008.

== 2011: Arrest for illegal betting ==
On Sunday 15 May 2011 a raid was carried out by Punjab Police in a Lahore shopping mall, there Raza along with six other men were arrested for betting on Indian Premier League matches, police recovered telephones, computers, televisions and a large amount of money during the raid, all seven men were charged later the same day.

== 2012: Reinstated as umpire ==
Akram Raza, has been reinstated to the Pakistan Cricket Board umpiring panel, following his suspension for his alleged involvement in an illegal betting racket. After year-long proceedings in a Lahore court, he regained his PCB role. Javed Miandad, Pakistan Cricket Board director general, defended his appointment, saying the umpire had produced proof that he was innocent.
