= T. M. Samarasinghe =

Sri Lankan cricket umpire (1942–2004)

T.M. Samarasinghe
Personal information
- Full name: Thammahetti Mudalige Samarasinghe
- Born: 26 August 1942; Mholawa, Sri Lanka
- Died: 4 June 2004 (aged 61); Sandalankawa
- Role: Umpire

Umpiring information
- Tests umpired: 7 (1992–1993)
- ODIs umpired: 14 (1992–1998)
- FC umpired: 116 (1989–2002)
- LA umpired: 46 (1991–2002)
- Source: CricketArchive, 17 June 2013

Thammahetti Mudalige Samarasinghe (26 August 1942 – 4 June 2004) was a Sri Lankan cricket umpire. He officiated in Sri Lankan domestic and international cricket matches from 1989 to 2002. He stood in seven Test matches in 1992-1993 and 14 ODI games between 1992 and 1998.

== See also ==
- List of Test cricket umpires
- List of One Day International cricket umpires
