= Udaya Wickramasinghe =

Sri Lankan cricket umpire

Personal information
- Full name: Wickrama Arachchige Udaya Wickramasinghe
- Born: 12 August 1939; Matugama, Sri Lanka
- Died: 12 April 2010 (aged 70)
- Role: Umpire, Referee

Umpiring information
- Tests umpired: 3 (1987–1997)
- ODIs umpired: 13 (1991–1998)
- Source: Cricinfo, 17 August 2010

Wickrama Arachchige Udaya Wickramasinghe (12 August 1939 – 12 April 2010) was a Sri Lankan cricket umpire.

Wickramasinghe was born in Matugama in Sri Lanka. He was educated at St Peter's College and Dharmapala College, and worked as an Immigration Officer in the Immigration Department in Sri Lanka.

His cricket umpiring career began in 1969 in Sri Lankan domestic cricket. He served as an umpire in international cricket from 1987 to 1998. He was the first overseas umpire to qualify as an official instructor of the Association of Cricket Umpires and Scorers in England in 1988.

He stood as an umpire in three Tests, all played in Sri Lanka and all of which were drawn. He made his debut as a Test umpire in the First Test between Sri Lanka and New Zealand at Colombo Cricket Club Ground in April 1987; then umpired the Second Test between Sri Lanka and Australia at Khettarama Cricket Stadium, Colombo in August 1992; and finally the First Test between Sri Lanka and Pakistan at the R. Premadasa Stadium, Colombo in April 1997.

He also umpired 13 One-day Internationals between 1991 and 1998. Apart from 5 ODIs in Sharjah in October 1991 as part of the Wills Trophy, and the remaining 8 were all played in Sri Lanka. In the final of the Wills Trophy between India and Pakistan in Sharjah on 25 October 1991, he gave three consecutive leg before wicket decisions against Indian batsmen (Ravi Shastri, Mohammad Azharuddin, Sachin Tendulkar), and Pakistan bowler Aaqib Javed achieved the seventh ever ODI hat-trick and ultimately world record match bowling figures of 7–37 which were not beaten for 9 years.

He died in Colombo.

== See also ==
- List of Test cricket umpires
- List of One Day International cricket umpires
