= Ruwan Kalpage =

Sri Lankan cricketer (born 1970)

Personal information
- Full name: Ruwan Senani Kalpage
- Born: 19 February 1970 (age 56); Kandy, Sri Lanka
- Batting: Left-handed
- Bowling: Right-arm offbreak
- Role: All-rounder

International information
- National side: Sri Lanka (1992–1999)
- Test debut (cap 56): 27 July 1993 v India
- Last Test: 4 March 1999 v Pakistan
- ODI debut (cap 66): 10 January 1992 v Pakistan
- Last ODI: 30 March 1999 v India

Career statistics
Competition	Test	ODI	FC	LA
Matches	11	86	153	146
Runs scored	294	844	5,843	2,055
Batting average	18.37	20.58	34.16	25.68
100s/50s	0/2	0/1	14/22	1/7
Top score	63	51	189	108
Balls bowled	1,576	3,960	23,495	6,251
Wickets	12	73	427	149
Bowling average	64.50	40.75	22.71	30.61
5 wickets in innings	0	0	15	1
10 wickets in match	0	0	5	0
Best bowling	2/27	4/36	7/27	6/32
Catches/stumpings	10/–	33/–	104/–	45/–
- Source: Cricinfo, 24 December 2014

Ruwan Senani Kalpage (born 19 February 1970) is a former Sri Lankan cricketer. He was a left-handed batsman and a right-arm offbreak bowler.

He studied at St. Anthony's College, Kandy and played for the College Cricket team in 1989. His international cricket career ended in March 1999.

== Coaching career ==
He was appointed as the high performance head coach for Bangladesh's National Cricket Academy in 2008. He has worked with the Oman national cricket team as a spin bowling and fielding coach.
