= Netherlands at the Cricket World Cup =

The Dutch cricket team is a national cricket team representing the Netherlands. It is administered by the Koninklijke Nederlandse Cricket Bond (Royal Dutch Cricket Association) which is based in Amstelveen close to Amsterdam and is older than many renowned cricket clubs in the West Indies, Australia, and New Zealand. The Netherlands have participated in the 1996, 2003, 2007 2011, and 2023 Cricket World Cups.

== Cricket World Cup Record ==
Cricket World Cup record								Qualification record				
Year	Round	Position	GP	W	L	T	NR	Pld	W	L	T	NR
(England) 1975	Did not participate							No qualifier held				
(England) 1979	Did not qualify							4	1	2	0	1
(England) (Wales) 1983	Did not qualify							7	3	1	0	3
(India) (Pakistan) 1987	Did not qualify							9	7	2	0	0
(Australia) (New Zealand) 1992	Did not qualify							9	7	2	0	0
(India) (Pakistan) (Sri Lanka) 1996	Group stage	12/12	5	0	5	0	0	9	7	2	0	0
(England) (Wales) (Scotland) (Republic of Ireland) (Netherlands) 1999	Did not qualify							8	3	3	0	2
(South Africa) 2003	Group stage	11/14	6	1	5	0	0	10	9	1	0	0
(Cricket West Indies) 2007	Group stage	12/16	3	1	2	0	0	7	5	2	0	0
(India) (Sri Lanka) (Bangladesh) 2011	Group stage	13/14	6	0	6	0	0	10	7	3	0	0
(Australia) (New Zealand) 2015	Did not qualify							20	12	6	1	1
(England) (Wales) 2019	Did not qualify							25	16	7	0	2
(India) 2023	Group Stage	10/10	9	2	7	0	0	32	7	23	1	1
Total	5/13	0 titles	29	4	25	0	0	150	84	54	2	10

=== World Cup Record (By Team) ===
Cricket World Cup matches (By team)
Against	Wins	Draws	Losses	Total	First win
Afghanistan	0	0	1	1	
Australia	0	0	3	3	
Bangladesh	1	0	1	2	28 October 2023
England	0	0	4	4	
India	0	0	3	3	
Ireland	0	0	1	1	
Namibia	1	0	0	1	27 February 2003
New Zealand	0	0	2	2	
Pakistan	0	0	3	3	
Scotland	1	0	0	1	20 March 2007
South Africa	1	0	3	4	17 October 2023
Sri Lanka	0	0	1	1	
United Arab Emirates	0	0	1	1	
West Indies	0	0	1	1	
Zimbabwe	0	0	1	1	
Total	4	0	25	29	

== Tournament results ==
=== 1996 World Cup ===
In 1994 the Dutch finally qualified for the World Cup, after finishing third in that year's ICC Trophy. In the World Cup itself in 1996, they were eliminated in the first round, but performed with some credit in their game against England.

Squad

- Steven Lubbers (c)
- Reinout Scholte (wk)
- Flavian Aponso
- Peter Cantrell
- Nolan Clarke
- Bas Zuiderent
- Tim de Leede
- Roland Lefebvre
- Paul-Jan Bakker
- Klaas-Jan van Noortwijk
- Eric Gouka
- Robert van Oosterom
- Marcelis Schewe (wk)
- Floris Jansen

Results

Group stage (Group B)						Quarterfinal	Semifinal	Final	Overall Result
Opposition Result	Opposition Result	Opposition Result	Opposition Result	Opposition Result	Rank	Opposition Result	Opposition Result	Opposition Result	Overall Result
New Zealand; L by 119 runs	England; L by 49 runs	Pakistan; L by 8 wickets	United Arab Emirates; L by 7 wickets	South Africa; L by 160 runs	6	Did not advance			Group stage

Scorecards

Group stage (Group B)

17 February
Scorecard

New Zealand; 307/8 (50 overs)	v	Netherlands; 188/7 (50 overs)
Craig Spearman 68 (59); Steven Lubbers 3/48 (9 overs)		Peter Cantrell 45 (86); Chris Harris 3/24 (10 overs)

New Zealand won by 119 runs
Reliance Stadium, Baroda
Umpires: Khizer Hayat and Ian Robinson
Player of the match: Craig Spearman (NZ)

22 February
Scorecard

England; 279/4 (50 overs)	v	Netherlands; 230/6 (50 overs)
Graeme Hick 104* (133); Roland Lefebvre 1/40 (10 overs)		Klaas van Noortwijk 64 (82); Phil DeFreitas 3/31 (10 overs)

England won by 49 runs
Arbab Niaz Stadium, Peshawar
Umpires: Steve Bucknor and K.T. Francis
Player of the match: Graeme Hick (Eng)

26 February
Scorecard

Netherlands; 145/7 (50 overs)	v	Pakistan; 151/2 (30.4 overs)
Flavian Aponso 58; Waqar Younis 4/26		Saeed Anwar 83*; Peter Cantrell 1/18 (4 overs)

Pakistan won by 8 wickets
Gaddafi Stadium, Lahore
Umpires: K.T. Francis and Steve Bucknor
Player of the match: Waqar Younis (Pak)

1 March
Scorecard

Netherlands; 216/9 (50 overs)	v	United Arab Emirates; 220/3 (44.2 overs)
Peter Cantrell 47 (106); Shaukat Dukanwala 5/29 (10 overs)		Saleem Raza 84 (68); Roland Lefebvre 1/24 (8 overs)

United Arab Emirates won by 7 wickets
Gaddafi Stadium, Lahore
Umpires: Mahboob Shah and Steve Randell
Player of the match: Shaukat Dukanwala (UAE)

- This was the first ever official ODI between two ICC Associate teams.

5 March

South Africa; 328/3 (50 overs)	v	Netherlands; 168/8 (50 overs)
Andrew Hudson 161 (132); Eric Gouka 1/32 (2 overs)		Nolan Clarke 32 (46); Allan Donald 2/21 (6 overs)

South Africa won by 160 runs
Rawalpindi Cricket Stadium, Rawalpindi
Umpires: Khizer Hayat and Steve Randell
Player of the match: Andrew Hudson (SA)

=== 2003 World Cup ===
2001 finally saw the Netherlands win the ICC Trophy, beating Namibia in the final in Toronto. They thus qualified for the 2003 World Cup. They again failed to progress beyond the first round in the tournament, but recorded their first one-day international win over Namibia during the tournament. Feiko Kloppenburg (with 121) and Klaas-Jan van Noortwijk (134 not out) scored the first two One Day International centuries in the side's history.

Squad

- Roland Lefebvre (c)
- Jeroen Smits (wk)
- Daan van Bunge
- Bas Zuiderent
- Tim de Leede
- Klaas-Jan van Noortwijk
- Luuk van Troost
- Ruud Nijman
- Adeel Raja
- Edgar Schiferli
- Nick Statham
- Reinout Scholte (wk)
- Jacob-Jan Esmeijer
- Hendrik-Jan Mol
- Feiko Kloppenburg

Note: Ruud Nijman replaced Victor Grandia.

Results

Pool stage (Pool A)							Super Sixes		Semifinal	Final	Overall Result
Opposition Result	Opposition Result	Opposition Result	Opposition Result	Opposition Result	Opposition Result	Rank	Opposition Result	Rank	Opposition Result	Opposition Result	Overall Result
India; L by 68 runs	England; L by 6 wickets	Australia; L by 75 runs (D/L)	Pakistan; L by 97 runs	Zimbabwe; L by 99 runs	Namibia; W by 64 runs	6	Did not advance				Pool stage

Scorecards

Pool stage (Pool A)

12 February 2003
Scorecard

India; 204 (48.5 overs)	v	Netherlands; 136 (48.1 overs)
Sachin Tendulkar 52 (72); Tim de Leede 4/35 (9.5 overs)		Daan van Bunge 62 (116); Javagal Srinath 4/30 (9.1 overs)

India won by 68 runs.
Boland Bank Park, Paarl, South Africa
Umpires: Daryl Harper and Peter Willey
Player of the match: Tim de Leede (Net)

16 February 2003
Scorecard

Netherlands; 142/9 (50 overs)	v	England; 144/4 (23.2 overs)
Tim de Leede 58 (96); James Anderson 4/25 (10 overs)		Michael Vaughan 51 (47); Daan van Bunge 3/16 (3 overs)

England won by 6 wickets.
Buffalo Park, East London, South Africa
Umpires: Darrell Hair and Rudi Koertzen
Player of the match: James Anderson (Eng)

20 February 2003
Scorecard

Australia; 170/2 (36 overs)	v	Netherlands; 122 (30.2 overs)
Damien Martyn 67 (76); Tim de Leede 2/34 (7 overs)		Tim de Leede 24 (38); Andy Bichel 3/13 (5 overs)

Australia won by 76 runs (D/L method).
North West Cricket Stadium, Potchefstroom, South Africa
Umpires: Dave Orchard and Peter Willey
Player of the match: Damien Martyn (Aus)

- Rain meant that Netherlands had a revised target of 198 from 36 overs.

25 February 2003
Scorecard

Pakistan; 253/9 (50 overs)	v	Netherlands; 156 (39.3 overs)
Yousuf Youhana 58 (59); Daan van Bunge 2/27 (4 overs)		Daan van Bunge 31 (60); Wasim Akram 3/24 (8.3 overs)

Pakistan won by 97 runs.
Boland Bank Park, Paarl, South Africa
Umpires: Steve Bucknor and Srinivas Venkataraghavan
Player of the match: Yousuf Youhana (Pak)

28 February 2003
Scorecard

Zimbabwe; 301/8 (50 overs)	v	Netherlands; 202/9 (50 overs)
Andy Flower 71 (72); Roland Lefebvre 2/38 (8 overs)		Daan van Bunge 37 (47); Brian Murphy 3/44 (10 overs)

Zimbabwe won by 99 runs.
Queens Sports Club, Bulawayo, Zimbabwe
Umpires: Steve Bucknor and Tyron Wijewardene
Player of the match: Heath Streak (Zim)

27 February 2003
Scorecard

Netherlands; 314/4 (50 overs)	v	Namibia; 250 (46.5 overs)
Klaas-Jan van Noortwijk 134 (129); Louis Burger 2/49 (10 overs)		Gavin Murgatroyd 52 (62); Feiko Kloppenburg 4/42 (10 overs)

Netherlands won by 64 runs
Goodyear Park, Bloemfontein, South Africa
Umpires: Daryl Harper (Aus) and Nadeem Ghauri (Pak)
Player of the match: Feiko Kloppenburg (NLD)

=== 2007 World Cup ===
In the 2005 ICC Trophy, the Netherlands finished 5th, qualifying for the 2007 Cricket World Cup, and gaining one-day International status until the 2009 ICC World Cup Qualifier. The 2007 World Cup was in the West Indies, and the Netherlands were eliminated in the first round, though they did beat Scotland along the way.

Squad

- Luuk van Troost (c)
- Jeroen Smits (wk)
- Darron Reekers
- Bas Zuiderent
- Alexei Kervezee
- Eric Szwarczynski
- Edgar Schiferli
- Peter Borren
- Tim de Leede
- Ryan ten Doeschate
- Billy Stelling
- Mark Jonkman
- Adeel Raja
- Mohammad Kashif
- Daan van Bunge

Results

Group stage (Group A)				Super 8		Semifinal	Final	Overall Result
Opposition Result	Opposition Result	Opposition Result	Rank	Opposition Result	Rank	Opposition Result	Opposition Result	Overall Result
South Africa; L by 221 runs	Australia; L by 229 runs	Scotland; W by 8 wickets	3	Did not advance				Group stage

Scorecards

Group stage (Group A)

16 March
Scorecard

South Africa; 353/3 (40 overs)	v	Netherlands; 132/9 (40 overs)
Jacques Kallis 128* (109); Billy Stelling 1/43 (8 overs)		Ryan ten Doeschate 57 (74); Justin Kemp 2/18 (4 overs)

South Africa won by 221 runs
Warner Park Stadium, Basseterre
Umpires: Mark Benson (Eng) and Tony Hill (NZ)
Player of the match: Herschelle Gibbs (SA)

- Match reduced to 40 overs due to rain

18 March
Scorecard

Australia; 358/5 (50 overs)	v	Netherlands; 129 (26.5 overs)
Brad Hodge 123* (89); Tim de Leede 2/40 (10 overs)		Daan van Bunge 33 (33); Brad Hogg 4/27 (4.5 overs)

Australia won by 229 runs
Warner Park Stadium, Basseterre
Umpires: Steve Bucknor (WI) and Tony Hill (NZ)
Player of the match: Brad Hodge (Aus)

22 March
Scorecard

Scotland; 136 (34.1 overs)	v	Netherlands; 140/2 (23.5 overs)
Glenn Rogers 26 (30); Billy Stelling 3/12 (8 overs)		Ryan ten Doeschate 70* (68); John Blain 2/29 (5 overs)

Netherlands won by 8 wickets
Warner Park Stadium, Basseterre
Umpires: Asoka de Silva (SL) and Tony Hill (NZ)
Player of the match: Billy Stelling (Ned)

=== 2011 World Cup ===
On 22 February 2011, The Netherlands posted their highest ever total against a full-member nation, scoring 292 against England, batting first at the 2011 Cricket World Cup. Ryan Ten Doeschate top scored 119 from 110 balls. However, the Netherlands were unable to defend their strong total and failed to pull off a huge shock, England winning by 6 wickets with 2 overs to spare. They eventually failed to win any of their group matches and were last in their Group.

Squad

- Peter Borren (c)
- Wesley Barresi (wk)
- Atse Buurman (wk)
- Tom Cooper
- Tom de Grooth
- Alexei Kervezee
- Eric Szwarczynski
- Bas Zuiderent
- Pieter Seelaar
- Ryan ten Doeschate
- Mudassar Bukhari
- Bernard Loots
- Adeel Raja
- Bradley Kruger
- Berend Westdijk

Results

Group stage (Group B)							Quarterfinal	Semifinal	Final	Overall Result
Opposition Result	Opposition Result	Opposition Result	Opposition Result	Opposition Result	Opposition Result	Rank	Opposition Result	Opposition Result	Opposition Result	Overall Result
England; L by 6 wickets	West Indies; L by 215 runs	South Africa; L by 231 runs	India; L by 5 wickets	Bangladesh; L by 6 wickets	Ireland; L by 6 wickets	7	Did not advance			Group stage

Scorecards

Group stage (Group B)

22 February 2011
14:30 (D/N)
Scorecard

Netherlands; 292/6 (50 overs)	v	England; 296/4 (48.4 overs)
Ryan ten Doeschate 119 (110); Graeme Swann 2/35 (10 overs)		Andrew Strauss 88 (83); Ryan ten Doeschate 2/47 (10 overs)

England won by 6 wickets
Vidarbha Cricket Association Stadium, Nagpur
Umpires: Asad Rauf (Pak) and Bruce Oxenford (Aus)
Player of the match: Ryan ten Doeschate (Ned)

- Netherlands won the toss and elected to bat.

28 February 2011
14:30 (D/N)
Scorecard

West Indies; 330/8 (50 overs)	v	Netherlands; 115 (31.3 overs)
Chris Gayle 80 (110); Mudassar Bukhari 2/65 (10 overs)		Tom Cooper 55* (72); Kemar Roach 6/27 (8.3 overs)

West Indies won by 215 runs
Feroz Shah Kotla Stadium, Delhi
Umpires: Amiesh Saheba (Ind) and Simon Taufel (Aus)
Player of the match: Kemar Roach (WI)

- Netherlands won the toss and elected to field.

3 March 2011
09:30
Scorecard

South Africa; 351/5 (50 overs)	v	Netherlands; 120 (34.5 overs)
AB de Villiers 134 (98); Ryan ten Doeschate 3/72 (10 overs)		Wesley Barresi 44 (66); Imran Tahir 3/19 (6.5 overs)

South Africa won by 231 runs
Punjab Cricket Association Stadium, Mohali
Umpires: Asoka de Silva (SL) and Richard Kettleborough (Eng)
Player of the match: AB de Villiers (SA)

- Netherlands won the toss and elected to field.

9 March 2011
14:30 (D/N)
Scorecard

Netherlands; 189 (46.4 overs)	v	India; 191/5 (36.3 overs)
Peter Borren 38 (36); Zaheer Khan 3/20 (6.4 overs)		Yuvraj Singh 51* (73); Pieter Seelaar 3/53 (10 overs)

India won by 5 wickets
Feroz Shah Kotla Stadium, Delhi
Umpires: Steve Davis (Aus) and Bruce Oxenford (Aus)
Player of the match: Yuvraj Singh (Ind)

- Netherlands won the toss and elected to bat.

14 March 2011
09:30
Scorecard

Netherlands; 160 (46.2 overs)	v	Bangladesh; 166/4 (41.2 overs)
Ryan ten Doeschate 53* (71); Abdur Razzak 3/29 (10 overs)		Imrul Kayes 73* (113); Tom Cooper 2/33 (7.2 overs)

Bangladesh won by 6 wickets
Zohur Ahmed Chowdhury Stadium, Chittagong
Umpires: Aleem Dar (Pak) and Rod Tucker (Aus)
Player of the match: Imrul Kayes (Ban)

- Netherlands won the toss and elected to bat.

18 March 2011
09:30
Scorecard

Netherlands; 306 (50 overs)	v	Ireland; 307/4 (47.4 overs)
Ryan ten Doeschate 106 (108); Paul Stirling 2/51 (10 overs)		Paul Stirling 101 (72); Tom Cooper 2/31 (7 overs)

Ireland won by 6 wickets
Eden Gardens, Kolkata
Umpires: Billy Doctrove (WI) and Ian Gould (Eng)
Player of the match: Paul Stirling (Ire)

- Ireland won the toss and elected to field.

=== 2023 World Cup ===
Squad

- Scott Edwards (c, wk)
- Max O'Dowd
- Bas de Leede
- Vikramjit Singh
- Teja Nidamanuru
- Paul van Meekeren
- Colin Ackermann
- Roelof van der Merwe
- Logan van Beek
- Aryan Dutt
- Noah Croes
- Wesley Barresi
- Saqib Zulfiqar
- Shariz Ahmad
- Sybrand Engelbrecht

Note: Noah Croes replaced Ryan Klein due to injury.

Results

League stage										Semifinal	Final	Overall Result
Opposition Result	Opposition Result	Opposition Result	Opposition Result	Opposition Result	Opposition Result	Opposition Result	Opposition Result	Opposition Result	Rank	Opposition Result	Opposition Result	Overall Result
Pakistan; L by 81 runs	New Zealand; L by 99 runs	South Africa; W by 38 runs	Sri Lanka; L by 5 wickets	Australia; L by 309 runs	Bangladesh; W by 87 runs	Afghanistan; L by 7 wickets	England; L by 160 runs	India; L by 160 runs	10	Did not advance		League stage

Scorecards

League stage

6 October 2023
14:00 (D/N)
Scorecard

Pakistan; 286 (49 overs)	v	Netherlands; 205 (41 overs)
Saud Shakeel 68 (52); Bas de Leede 4/62 (9 overs)		Bas de Leede 67 (68); Haris Rauf 3/43 (9 overs)

Pakistan won by 81 runs
Rajiv Gandhi International Cricket Stadium, Hyderabad
Umpires: Chris Brown (NZ) and Adrian Holdstock (SA)
Player of the match: Saud Shakeel (Pak)

- Netherlands won the toss and elected to field.

9 October 2023
14:00 (D/N)
Scorecard

New Zealand; 322/7 (50 overs)	v	Netherlands; 223 (46.3 overs)
Will Young 70 (80); Roelof van der Merwe 2/56 (9 overs)		Colin Ackermann 69 (73); Mitchell Santner 5/59 (10 overs)

New Zealand won by 99 runs
Rajiv Gandhi International Cricket Stadium, Hyderabad
Umpires: Paul Reiffel (Aus) and Rod Tucker (Aus)
Player of the match: Mitchell Santner (NZ)

- Netherlands won the toss and elected to field.
- Sybrand Engelbrecht (Ned) made his ODI debut.

17 October 2023
14:00 (D/N)
Scorecard

Netherlands; 245/8 (43 overs)	v	South Africa; 207 (42.5 overs)
Scott Edwards 78* (69); Marco Jansen 2/27 (8 overs)		David Miller 43 (52); Logan van Beek 3/60 (8.5 overs)

Netherlands won by 38 runs
Himachal Pradesh Cricket Association Stadium, Dharamshala
Umpires: Michael Gough (Eng) and Richard Kettleborough (Eng)
Player of the match: Scott Edwards (Ned)

- South Africa won the toss and elected to field.
- The match was reduced to 43 overs per side due to rain.
- This was Netherlands first win against South Africa in ODI cricket.

21 October 2023
10:30
Scorecard

Netherlands; 262 (49.4 overs)	v	Sri Lanka; 263/5 (48.2 overs)
Sybrand Engelbrecht 70 (82); Dilshan Madushanka 4/49 (9.4 overs)		Sadeera Samarawickrama 91* (107); Aryan Dutt 3/44 (10 overs)

Sri Lanka won by 5 wickets
Ekana Cricket Stadium, Lucknow
Umpires: Marais Erasmus (SA) and Ahsan Raza (Pak)
Player of the match: Sadeera Samarawickrama (SL)

- Netherlands won the toss and elected to bat.

25 October 2023
14:00 (D/N)
Scorecard

Australia; 399/8 (50 overs)	v	Netherlands; 90 (21 overs)
Glenn Maxwell 106 (44); Logan van Beek 4/74 (10 overs)		Vikramjit Singh 25 (25); Adam Zampa 4/8 (3 overs)

Australia won by 309 runs
Arun Jaitley Cricket Stadium, New Delhi
Umpires: Michael Gough (Eng) and Sharfuddoula (Ban)
Player of the match: Glenn Maxwell (Aus)

- Australia won the toss and elected to bat.
- Glenn Maxwell (Aus) broke Aiden Markram's record for the fastest century in World Cup history, in terms of balls faced (40).
- Bas de Leede (Ned) conceded 115 runs, the most by any bowler in an ODI innings, surpassing Mick Lewis and Adam Zampa (both 113).
- Australia's recorded the highest margin of victory in World Cup history and second overall by any team, in terms of runs (309), surpassing their 275-run win against Afghanistan in 2015.

28 October 2023
14:00 (D/N)
Scorecard

Netherlands; 229 (50 overs)	v	Bangladesh; 142 (42.2 overs)
Scott Edwards 68 (89); Mustafizur Rahman 2/36 (10 overs)		Mehidy Hasan 35 (40); Paul van Meekeren 4/23 (7.2 overs)

Netherlands won by 87 runs
Eden Gardens, Kolkata
Umpires: Joel Wilson (WI) and Paul Wilson (Aus)
Player of the match: Paul van Meekeren (Ned)

- Netherlands won the toss and elected to bat.

3 November 2023
14:00 (D/N)
Scorecard

Netherlands; 179 (46.3 overs)	v	Afghanistan; 181/3 (31.3 overs)
Sybrand Engelbrecht 58 (86); Mohammad Nabi 3/28 (9.3 overs)		Hashmatullah Shahidi 56* (64); Saqib Zulfiqar 1/25 (3 overs)

Afghanistan won by 7 wickets
Ekana Cricket Stadium, Lucknow
Umpires: Nitin Menon (Ind) and Sharfuddoula (Ban)
Player of the match: Mohammad Nabi (Afg)

- Netherlands won the toss and elected to bat.
- Mujeeb Ur Rahman (Afg) took his 100th wicket in ODIs.
- Afghanistan qualified for the 2025 ICC Champions Trophy as a result of this match. It would be their first appearance in the tournament.

8 November 2023
14:00 (D/N)
Scorecard

England; 339/9 (50 overs)	v	Netherlands; 179 (37.2 overs)
Ben Stokes 108 (84); Bas de Leede 3/74 (10 overs)		Teja Nidamanuru 41* (34); Moeen Ali 3/42 (8.2 overs)

England won by 160 runs
Maharashtra Cricket Association Stadium, Pune
Umpires: Ahsan Raza (Pak) and Rod Tucker (Aus)
Player of the match: Ben Stokes (Eng)

- England won the toss and elected to bat.
- Netherlands were eliminated as a result of this match.

12 November 2023
14:00 (D/N)
Scorecard

India; 410/4 (50 overs)	v	Netherlands; 250 (47.5 overs)
Shreyas Iyer 128* (94); Bas de Leede 2/82 (10 overs)		Teja Nidamanuru 54 (39); Mohammed Siraj 2/29 (6 overs)

India won by 160 runs
M. Chinnaswamy Stadium, Bengaluru
Umpires: Chris Gaffaney (NZ) and Michael Gough (Eng)
Player of the match: Shreyas Iyer (Ind)

- India won the toss and elected to bat.
- Rohit Sharma (Ind) broke AB de Villiers' 2015 record for the most sixes in ODIs in a year (60).
- KL Rahul broke Rohit Sharma's record for the fastest century by an India cricketer in World Cups, in terms of balls faced (62).
- Shreyas Iyer and KL Rahul broke Michael Clarke and Brad Hodge's record for the highest fourth wicket partnership in a World Cup match (208 runs).

== Records and statistics ==
=== Highest innings totals ===
Score	Opponent	Venue	Year
314/4 (50 overs)	v Namibia	Mangaung Oval	2003
306 (50 overs)	v Ireland	Eden Gardens	2011
296/6 (50 overs)	v England	Vidarbha Cricket Association Stadium	2011
262 (49.4 overs)	v Sri Lanka	Bharat Ratna Shri Atal Bihari Vajpayee Ekana Cricket Stadium	2023
245/8 (43 overs)	v South Africa	HPCA Stadium	2023
Source: Updated: 7 April 2021

=== Lowest completed innings ===
Score	Opponent	Venue	Year
90 (21 overs)	v Australia	Arun Jaitley Stadium	2023
115 (31.3 overs)	v West Indies	Feroz Shah Kotla	2011
120 (34.5 overs)	v South Africa	Punjab Cricket Association Stadium	2011
129 (26.5 overs)	v Australia	Warner Park Stadium	2007
132/9 (40 overs)	v South Africa	Warner Park Stadium	2007
Source:(unfinished innings excluded from this list) Updated: 7 April 2021

=== Highest individual innings ===
Player	Score	Opponent	Venue	Year
Klaas-Jan van Noortwijk	134*	Namibia	Mangaung Oval	2003
Feiko Kloppenburg	121	Namibia	Mangaung Oval	2003
Ryan ten Doeschate	119	England	Vidarbha Cricket Association Stadium	2011
Ryan ten Doeschate	106	Ireland	Eden Gardens	2011
Peter Borren	84	Ireland	Eden Gardens	2011
Source: Updated: 7 April 2021

=== Best bowling figures ===
Bowling figures	Player	Opponent	Venue	Year
4/23 (7.2 overs)	Paul van Meekeren	v Bangladesh	Eden Gardens	2023
4/35 (9.5 overs)	Tim de Leede	v India	Boland Bank Park	2003
4/42 (10 overs)	Feiko Kloppenburg	v Namibia	Mangaung Oval	2003
4/42 (8.5 overs)	Adeel Raja	v Namibia	Mangaung Oval	2003
3/12 (8 overs)	Billy Stelling	v Scotland	Warner Park	2007
Source: Updated: 7 April 2021

=== Most matches ===
Number of matches	Player	Years spanned
18	Bastiaan Zuiderent	1996–2011
14	Tim de Leede	1996–2007
9	6 Dutch players have 9 World Cup matches.	
Source: Updated: 7 April 2021

=== Most runs ===
Runs	Player	Years spanned
435	Ryan ten Doeschate	2007–2011
322	Klaas-Jan van Noortwijk	1996–2003
223	Tim de Leede	1996–2007
199	Peter Borren	2007–2011
196	Bastiaan Zuiderent	1996–2011
Source: Updated: 7 May 2021

== See also ==
- Netherlands national cricket team
- Cricket in the Netherlands
