= 2002 Champions Trophy squads =

Cricket tournament

The 2002 ICC Champions Trophy was a cricket tournament that was held in Sri Lanka in 2002. It was the third edition of the ICC Champions Trophy – the first two having been known as the ICC Knock Out Tournaments. The tournament was due to be held in India, but was switched to Sri Lanka when an exemption from tax in India was not granted. Fifteen matches were to be played in the tournament including two semi-finals and a final match.[1] All the matches were played in Colombo at two grounds: R. Premadasa Stadium and Sinhalese Sports Club Ground. It was the first time that the teams of all International Cricket Council (ICC) member nations visited Sri Lanka to participate in a cricket tournament.[1]

Twelve teams competed: the 10 Test-playing nations plus Kenya who has full One Day International (ODI) status and the 2001 ICC Trophy winners the Netherlands. The teams were split into four pools of three teams each. Each team played the other two teams in its pool once, and the four teams that lead in each pool proceeded to the Semi-finals.[2][3] Australia lost to Sri Lanka in the first semi-final whereas India defeated South Africa in the second semi final. The final between India and Sri Lanka was washed out twice, to leave no result.[4] Virender Sehwag was the highest run-scorer of the tournament and Muttiah Muralitharan was the highest wicket-taker.

This is a list of squads that participated in the 2002 ICC Champions Trophy.

== Squads ==
=== Australia ===
- Ricky Ponting (captain)
- Adam Gilchrist (vice-captain)
- Michael Bevan
- Jason Gillespie
- Nathan Hauritz
- Matthew Hayden
- Brett Lee
- Darren Lehmann
- Jimmy Maher
- Damien Martyn
- Glenn McGrath
- Shane Warne
- Shane Watson

=== Bangladesh ===
- Khaled Mashud (captain)
- Al Sahariar
- Alok Kapali
- Fahim Muntasir
- Habibul Bashar
- Javed Omar
- Khaled Mahmud
- Manjural Islam
- Mazharul Haque
- Mohammad Ashraful
- Mohammad Rafique
- Talha Jubair
- Tapash Baisya
- Tushar Imran

=== England ===
- Nasser Hussain (captain)
- Ian Blackwell
- Andy Caddick
- Rikki Clarke
- Dominic Cork
- Ashley Giles
- Matthew Hoggard
- Ronnie Irani
- James Kirtley
- Nick Knight
- Owais Shah
- Jeremy Snape
- Alec Stewart (wicket-keeper)
- Marcus Trescothick

=== India ===
- Sourav Ganguly (captain)
- Rahul Dravid (vice-captain)
- Sachin Tendulkar
- Virender Sehwag
- Dinesh Mongia
- Mohammad Kaif
- Anil Kumble
- Harbhajan Singh
- Zaheer Khan
- Ajit Agarkar
- Jai Prakash Yadav
- Ashish Nehra
- VVS Laxman
- Javagal Srinath
- Yuvraj Singh

=== Kenya ===
- Steve Tikolo (captain)
- Thomas Odoyo (vice-captain)
- Joseph Angara
- Jimmy Kamande
- Brijal Patel
- Collins Obuya
- David Obuya
- Maurice Odumbe
- Peter Ongondo
- Lameck Onyango
- Kennedy Otieno
- Ravindu Shah
- Tony Suji
- Martin Suji

=== Netherlands ===
- Roland Lefebvre (captain)
- Luuk van Troost
- Daan van Bunge
- Jacob-Jan Esmeijer
- Victor Grandia
- Feiko Kloppenburg
- Tim de Leede
- Hendrik-Jan Mol
- Robert van Oosterom
- Adeel Raja
- Edgar Schiferli
- Reinout Scholte
- Nick Statham
- Bas Zuiderent

=== New Zealand ===
- Stephen Fleming (captain)
- Nathan Astle
- Shane Bond
- Chris Harris
- Paul Hitchcock
- Kyle Mills
- Chris Nevin
- Jacob Oram
- Mathew Sinclair
- Scott Styris
- Glen Sulzberger
- Daryl Tuffey
- Daniel Vettori
- Lou Vincent

=== Pakistan ===
- Waqar Younis (captain)
- Inzamam-ul-Haq (vice-captain)
- Abdul Razzaq
- Imran Nazir
- Misbah-ul-Haq
- Mohammad Sami
- Rashid Latif (wicket-keeper)
- Saeed Anwar
- Shahid Afridi
- Shoaib Akhtar
- Shoaib Malik
- Wasim Akram
- Younis Khan
- Yousuf Youhana

=== South Africa ===
- Shaun Pollock (captain)
- Dale Benkenstein
- Nicky Boje
- Mark Boucher
- Alan Dawson
- Boeta Dippenaar
- Allan Donald
- Herschelle Gibbs
- Jacques Kallis
- Lance Klusener
- Makhaya Ntini
- Justin Ontong
- Jonty Rhodes
- Graeme Smith
- Robin Peterson

=== Sri Lanka ===
- Sanath Jayasuriya (captain)
- Russel Arnold
- Marvan Atapattu
- Mahela Jayawardene
- Aravinda de Silva
- Upul Chandana
- Kumar Sangakkara
- Kumar Dharmasena
- Tillakaratne Dilshan
- Chaminda Vaas
- Hasantha Fernando
- Dilhara Fernando
- Muttiah Muralitharan
- Pulasthi Gunaratne

=== West Indies ===
- Carl Hooper (captain)
- Shivnarine Chanderpaul
- Pedro Collins
- Corey Collymore
- Cameron Cuffy – withdrawn 4 September
- Mervyn Dillon
- Vasbert Drakes
- Chris Gayle
- Ryan Hinds
- Wavell Hinds
- Ridley Jacobs
- Brian Lara
- Runako Morton
- Mahendra Nagamootoo
- Ramnaresh Sarwan

=== Zimbabwe ===
- Heath Streak (captain)
- Alistair Campbell
- Stuart Carlisle
- Dion Ebrahim
- Sean Ervine
- Andy Flower
- Grant Flower
- Travis Friend
- Douglas Hondo
- Dougie Marillier
- Mpumelelo Mbangwa
- Raymond Price
- Tatenda Taibu
- Guy Whittall
