= 2002 Champions Trophy =

2002 cricket tournament held in Sri Lanka

2002 ICC Champions Trophy
- Dates: 12 September – 30 September 2002
- Administrator: International Cricket Council
- Cricket format: One Day International
- Tournament format(s): Round-robin and knockout
- Host: Sri Lanka
- Champions: India; Sri Lanka; (1st title)
- Participants: 12
- Matches: 16
- Player of the series: Not awarded
- Most runs: (India) Virender Sehwag (271)
- Most wickets: (Sri Lanka) Muttiah Muralitharan (10)

The 2002 ICC Champions Trophy was a cricket tournament held in Sri Lanka in 2002. It marked the third edition of the ICC Champions Trophy, with the previous two tournaments being known as the ICC Knock Out Tournaments. Originally scheduled to be held in India, the tournament was moved to Sri Lanka when India did not grant an exemption from tax, as needed. The tournament consisted of fifteen matches, including two semi-finals and a final match. This event was notable as it marked the first time that teams from all full member nations of the International Cricket Council (ICC) visited Sri Lanka to participate in a cricket tournament.

Twelve teams participated in the tournament: the ten Test-playing nations, along with Kenya, who held full One Day International (ODI) status, and the Netherlands, who were the winners of the 2001 ICC Trophy. The teams were divided into four pools, each consisting of three teams. In the pool stage, each team played the other two teams in its pool once. The top team from each pool advanced to the semi-finals.

In the first semi-final, Australia was defeated by Sri Lanka, while India emerged victorious over South Africa in the second semi-final. However, the final match between India and Sri Lanka was affected by rain and had to be abandoned on two occasions, resulting in no result being declared.

Virender Sehwag emerged as the highest run-scorer of the tournament, while Muttiah Muralitharan claimed the title of highest wicket-taker.

== Qualification ==
Twelve teams participated in the tournament: the ten Test-playing nations, along with Kenya, who held full One Day International (ODI) status, and the Netherlands, who were the winners of the 2001 ICC Trophy.

Qualification	Berths	Team
Host	1	Sri Lanka
ICC Full Member (Top 10)	10	Australia
ICC Full Member (Top 10)	10	Bangladesh
ICC Full Member (Top 10)	10	England
ICC Full Member (Top 10)	10	India
ICC Full Member (Top 10)	10	Kenya
ICC Full Member (Top 10)	10	New Zealand
ICC Full Member (Top 10)	10	Pakistan
ICC Full Member (Top 10)	10	South Africa
ICC Full Member (Top 10)	10	West Indies
ICC Full Member (Top 10)	10	Zimbabwe
2001 ICC Trophy	1	Netherlands

== Prize money ==
The total prize money for the 2002 ICC Champions Trophy was $1 million, and in addition, the 12 teams received $165,000 each for taking part in the tournament. The winning team of the tournament collected $525,000: $100,000 for winning both of its Pool matches, $125,000 for winning semi-final and $300,000 for winning the final.

== Tournament structure ==
Unlike the previous two editions of the Champions Trophy, which had a direct knockout format, this edition had a format in which teams were divided into pools instead and the first-placed teams of the respective pools at the end of pool stage would qualify to the knockout stage. The 12 teams—10 Test playing nations (plus Kenya and Netherlands)—were divided into four pools of three teams each, with every team playing two matches. Australia, Bangladesh and New Zealand were placed in Pool 1 whereas England, India and Zimbabwe were allotted Pool 2. Kenya, South Africa and West Indies were put together in Pool 3, and Netherlands, Pakistan and Sri Lanka played each other in Pool 4. The semi finals were played between the winners of Pool 2 and the winners of Pool 3, and Pool 1 and Pool 4.

=== Participating teams ===
Pool 1	Pool 2	Pool 3	Pool 4
Australia	England	Kenya	Netherlands
Bangladesh	India	South Africa	Pakistan
New Zealand	Zimbabwe	West Indies	Sri Lanka

== Venues ==
All the matches were played in Colombo at two grounds: R. Premadasa Stadium and Sinhalese Sports Club Ground.

Colombo
R. Premadasa Stadium	Sinhalese Sports Club
Capacity: 35,000	Capacity: 10,000
Matches: 9	Matches: 6

== Match officials ==
Match referees

- (Cricket West Indies) Clive Lloyd
- (Sri Lanka) Ranjan Madugalle
- (South Africa) Mike Procter
- (Pakistan) Wasim Raja
- (India) Gundappa Viswanath

Umpires

- (Cricket West Indies) Steve Bucknor
- (Sri Lanka) Asoka de Silva
- (Australia) Daryl Harper
- (South Africa) Rudi Koertzen
- (South Africa) Dave Orchard
- (England) David Shepherd
- (Zimbabwe) Russell Tiffin
- (India) Srinivas Venkataraghavan

== Pool matches ==
The first match of the tournament was played between Sri Lanka and Pakistan on 12 September 2002. Sri Lanka won the match by eight wickets with Sanath Jayasuriya scoring his thirteenth ODI century. He reached 8,000 runs in ODI during his innings. Sri Lanka reached into the semi-finals by winning their next match against the Netherlands by 202 runs. Australia, from the Pool 1, qualified for the semi-finals after defeating Bangladesh by nine wickets at the Sinhalese Sports Club Ground, Colombo. In their first Pool match, Australia had defeated New Zealand by 164 runs. They played Sri Lanka in the second semi-final of the tournament.

South Africa, who had defeated the West Indies in their opening match, made their place into the semi-finals from Pool 3 by winning over Kenya. They defeated Kenya by 176 runs with man of the match Herschelle Gibbs scoring 116 runs. The fourth semi-finalist of the tournament was India, who defeated Zimbabwe and England in the Pool matches. Virender Sehwag scored 126 runs against England. India faced South Africa in the first semi-final of the tournament.

=== Pool 1 ===
Pos	Team	Pld	W	L	T	NR	Pts	NRR
1	Australia	2	2	0	0	0	8	3.461
2	New Zealand	2	1	1	0	0	4	0.030
3	Bangladesh	2	0	2	0	0	0	−3.275

Source: ESPNcricinfo

15 September 2002
Scorecard

Australia; 296/7 (50 overs)	v	New Zealand; 132 (26.2 overs)
Damien Martyn 73 (87); Jacob Oram 2/60 (10 overs)		Shane Bond 26 (22); Glenn McGrath 5/37 (7 overs)

Australia won by 164 runs
Sinhalese Sports Club Ground, Colombo
Umpires: Dave Orchard (SA) and Russell Tiffin (Zim)
Player of the match: Glenn McGrath (Aus)

- Australia won the toss and elected to bat.

19 September 2002
Scorecard

Bangladesh; 129 (45.2 overs)	v	Australia; 133/1 (20.4 overs)
Alok Kapali 45 (75); Jason Gillespie 3/20 (10 overs)		Matthew Hayden 67* (70); Mohammad Rafique 1/32 (5 overs)

Australia won by 9 wickets
Sinhalese Sports Club Ground, Colombo
Umpires: Asoka de Silva (SL) and Russell Tiffin (Zim)
Player of the match: Jason Gillespie (Aus)

- Bangladesh won the toss and elected to bat.
- Mazharul Haque (Ban) made his ODI debut.
- As a result of this match, Australia qualified for the semi-finals.

23 September 2002
Scorecard

New Zealand; 244/9 (50 overs)	v	Bangladesh; 77 (19.3 overs)
Mathew Sinclair 70 (122); Mohammad Ashraful 3/26 (5 overs)		Tushar Imran 20 (16); Shane Bond 4/21 (5 overs)

New Zealand won by 167 runs
Sinhalese Sports Club Ground, Colombo
Umpires: Asoka de Silva (SL) and David Shepherd (Eng)
Player of the match: Shane Bond (NZ)

- Bangladesh won the toss and elected to field.
- Talha Jubair (Ban) made his ODI debut.

=== Pool 2 ===
Pos	Team	Pld	W	L	T	NR	Pts	NRR
1	India	2	2	0	0	0	8	0.816
2	England	2	1	1	0	0	4	0.517
3	Zimbabwe	2	0	2	0	0	0	−1.245

Source: ESPNcricinfo

14 September 2002
Scorecard

India; 288/6 (50 overs)	v	Zimbabwe; 274/8 (50 overs)
Mohammad Kaif 111* (112); Douglas Hondo 4/62 (9 overs)		Andy Flower 145 (164); Zaheer Khan 4/45 (10 overs)

India won by 14 runs
R. Premadasa Stadium, Colombo
Umpires: Asoka de Silva (SL) and Rudi Koertzen (SA)
Player of the match: Mohammad Kaif (Ind)

- India won the toss and elected to bat.
- Ray Price (Zim) made his ODI debut.

18 September 2002
Scorecard

England; 298/8 (50 overs)	v	Zimbabwe; 190/9 (48 overs)
Marcus Trescothick 119 (102); Douglas Hondo 4/45 (6 overs)		Heath Streak 50* (58); Ronnie Irani 4/37 (10 overs)

England won by 108 runs
R. Premadasa Stadium, Colombo
Umpires: Steve Bucknor (WI) and Rudi Koertzen (SA)
Player of the match: Marcus Trescothick (Eng)

- England won the toss and elected to bat.
- Ian Blackwell (Eng) made his ODI debut.
- Zimbabwe were fined 2 overs for a slow over rate.

22 September 2002
Scorecard

England; 269/7 (50 overs)	v	India; 271/2 (39.3 overs)
Ian Blackwell 82 (68); Ashish Nehra 2/49 (10 overs)		Virender Sehwag 126 (104); Ian Blackwell 1/46 (8 overs)

India won by 8 wickets
R. Premadasa Stadium, Colombo
Umpires: Steve Bucknor (WI) and Russell Tiffin (Zim)
Player of the match: Virender Sehwag (Ind)

- England won the toss and elected to bat.
- As a result of this match, India qualified for the semi-finals.

=== Pool 3 ===
Pos	Team	Pld	W	L	T	NR	Pts	NRR
1	South Africa	2	2	0	0	0	8	1.818
2	West Indies	2	1	1	0	0	4	0.253
3	Kenya	2	0	2	0	0	0	−2.050

Source: ESPNcricinfo

13 September 2002
Scorecard

West Indies; 238/8 (50 overs)	v	South Africa; 242/8 (49 overs)
Chris Gayle 49 (55); Jacques Kallis 2/41 (9 overs)		Jonty Rhodes 61 (70); Mervyn Dillon 4/60 (10 overs)

South Africa won by 2 wickets
Sinhalese Sports Club Ground, Colombo
Umpires: David Shepherd (Eng) and Srinivasaraghavan Venkataraghavan (Ind)
Player of the match: Jonty Rhodes (SA)

- South Africa won the toss and elected to field.

17 September 2002
Scorecard

West Indies; 261/6 (50 overs)	v	Kenya; 232 (49.1 overs)
Brian Lara 111 (120); Steve Tikolo 2/49 (7 overs)		Steve Tikolo 93 (91); Pedro Collins 3/18 (9.1 overs)

West Indies won by 29 runs
Sinhalese Sports Club Ground, Colombo
Umpires: Daryl Harper (Aus) and Srinivasaraghavan Venkataraghavan (Ind)
Player of the match: Brian Lara (WI)

- West Indies won the toss and elected to bat.

20 September 2002
Scorecard

South Africa; 316/5 (50 overs)	v	Kenya; 140 (46.5 overs)
Herschelle Gibbs 116 (126); Collins Obuya 2/77 (10 overs)		Steve Tikolo 69 (97); Dale Benkenstein 3/5 (3.5 overs)

South Africa won by 176 runs
R. Premadasa Stadium, Colombo
Umpires: Daryl Harper (Aus) and Srinivasaraghavan Venkataraghavan (Ind)
Player of the match: Herschelle Gibbs (SA)

- South Africa won the toss and elected to bat.
- As a result of this match, South Africa qualified for the semi-finals.

=== Pool 4 ===
Pos	Team	Pld	W	L	T	NR	Pts	NRR
1	Sri Lanka	2	2	0	0	0	8	2.861
2	Pakistan	2	1	1	0	0	4	1.245
3	Netherlands	2	0	2	0	0	0	−4.323

Source: ESPNcricinfo

12 September 2002
Scorecard

Pakistan; 200 (49.4 overs)	v	Sri Lanka; 201/2 (36.1 overs)
Saeed Anwar 52 (82); Muttiah Muralitharan 3/29 (10 overs)		Sanath Jayasuriya 102* (120); Wasim Akram 1/42 (8 overs)

Sri Lanka won by 8 wickets
R. Premadasa Stadium, Colombo
Umpires: Steve Bucknor (WI) and Daryl Harper (Aus)
Player of the match: Sanath Jayasuriya (SL)

- Pakistan won the toss and elected to bat.

16 September 2002
Scorecard

Sri Lanka; 292/6 (50 overs)	v	Netherlands; 86 (29.3 overs)
Marvan Atapattu 101 (118); Adeel Raja 2/50 (10 overs)		Tim de Leede 31 (43); Muttiah Muralitharan 4/15 (5.3 overs)

Sri Lanka won by 206 runs
R. Premadasa Stadium, Colombo
Umpires: Dave Orchard (SA) and David Shepherd (Eng)
Player of the match: Marvan Atapattu (SL)

- Sri Lanka won the toss and elected to bat.
- Adeel Raja, Daan van Bunge, Edgar Schiferli, Jacob-Jan Esmeijer, Luuk van Troost, Reinout Scholte and Victor Grandia (Ned) all made their ODI debuts.
- As a result of this match, Sri Lanka qualified for the semi-finals.

21 September 2002
Scorecard

Netherlands; 136 (50 overs)	v	Pakistan; 142/1 (16.2 overs)
Roland Lefebvre 32* (70); Shahid Afridi 3/18 (10 overs)		Imran Nazir 59 (40); Feiko Kloppenburg 1/23 (2 overs)

Pakistan won by 9 wickets
Sinhalese Sports Club Ground, Colombo
Umpires: Rudi Koertzen (SA) and Dave Orchard (SA)
Player of the match: Shahid Afridi (Pak)

- Netherlands won the toss and elected to bat.
- Hendrik-Jan Mol and Feiko Kloppenburg (Ned) both made their ODI debuts.

== Knockout matches ==
=== Semi-finals ===
Australia, India, South Africa, and Sri Lanka topped their respective Pools by winning their Pool matches and qualified for the semi-finals. In the first semi-final India faced South Africa and in the second semi-final Australia played against the hosts Sri Lanka.

Semifinals
WP2	India	261/9 (50 overs)
WP3	South Africa	251/6 (50 overs)
WP1	Australia	162 (48.4 overs)
WP4	Sri Lanka	163/3 (40 overs)

Final
SFW2	Sri Lanka	244/5 (50 overs)
SFW1	India	14/0 (2 overs)
Reserve Day
SFW2	Sri Lanka	222/7 (50 overs)
SFW1	India	38/1 (8.4 overs)

==== Semi-final 1 ====
The first semi-final was played between India and South Africa on 25 September 2002 at the R. Premadasa Stadium, Colombo. India batted first and scored 261 runs for nine wickets in 50 overs. Yuvraj Singh, Virender Sehwag and Rahul Dravid scored 62, 59 and 49 runs respectively. South African fast bowler Shaun Pollock took three wickets for 43 runs. Chasing the target of 262, South Africa collapsed after reaching 192 runs for one wicket with Herschelle Gibbs scoring 116 and Jacques Kallis 97 runs in 37 overs. Gibbs could not continue his inning due to heat exhaustion. Sehwag got three wickets for 25 runs, and was given the man of the match award for his performance. India won the match by 10 runs and qualified for the final of the tournament.

25 September 2002
Scorecard

India; 261/9 (50 overs)	v	South Africa; 251/6 (50 overs)
Yuvraj Singh 62 (72); Shaun Pollock 3/43 (9 overs)		Herschelle Gibbs 116 (119); Virender Sehwag 3/25 (5 overs)

India won by 10 runs
R. Premadasa Stadium, Colombo
Umpires: David Shepherd (Eng) and Russell Tiffin (Zim)
Player of the match: Virender Sehwag (Ind)

- India won the toss and elected to bat.
- Robin Peterson (SA) made his ODI debut.

==== Semi-final 2 ====
The second semi-final was played between Sri Lanka and Australia on 27 September 2002 at the same ground. Australia batted first and scored 162 runs all out. Tail-ender Shane Warne scored 36 runs followed by Adam Gilchrist and Damien Martyn scoring 31 and 28 runs respectively. Sri Lankan off-spinner Muttiah Muralitharan took three wickets for 26 runs. Aravinda de Silva, who was awarded Man of the Match, conceded only 16 runs in 10 overs and took Matthew Hayden's wicket. Sri Lanka, in their innings, reached the target of 163 runs in 40 overs losing only three wickets. Opener Marvan Atapattu scored 51 runs followed by wicketkeeper-batsman Kumar Sangakkara and Sanath Jayasuriya scoring 48 and 42 runs respectively. Glenn McGrath took two wickets for 41 runs in 10 overs.

27 September 2002
Scorecard

Australia; 162 (48.4 overs)	v	Sri Lanka; 163/3 (40 overs)
Shane Warne 36 (69); Muttiah Muralitharan 3/26 (9.4 overs)		Marvan Atapattu 51 (113); Glenn McGrath 2/41 (10 overs)

Sri Lanka won by 7 wickets
R. Premadasa Stadium, Colombo
Umpires: Steve Bucknor (WI) and Dave Orchard (SA)
Player of the match: Aravinda de Silva (SL)

- Australia won the toss and elected to bat.

=== Final ===
The 2002 ICC Champions Trophy Final was played on 29 and 30 September 2002 at the R. Premadasa Stadium, Colombo. On 29 September, Sri Lanka scored 244 runs including Jayasuriya and Kumar Sangakkara scoring fifties, and Indian off-spinner Harbhajan Singh took three wickets for 27 in 10 overs. In reply, India started their batting and scored 14 runs without any loss in two overs before the match was abandoned due to heavy rain; the match was finished in no result. It was decided that the new match would be played on the reserve day.

29 September 2002
Scorecard

Sri Lanka; 244/5 (50 overs)	v	India; 14/0 (2 overs)
Sanath Jayasuriya 74 (89); Harbhajan Singh 3/27 (10 overs)		Virender Sehwag 13* (5)

No result
R. Premadasa Stadium, Colombo
Umpires: Steve Bucknor (WI) and David Shepherd (Eng)

- Sri Lanka won the toss and elected to bat.
- Due to heavy rains, no further play was possible.
- The match was moved to reserve day on 30 September.

On the reserve day the Sri Lankans again batted first, scoring 222 runs including Mahela Jayawardene and Russel Arnold scoring 77 and 56 runs respectively, and Indian Zaheer Khan took three wickets for 44 runs. India scored 38 runs in 8.4 overs and the match was abandoned due to rain without result. According to ICC rules, an ODI match is only official after 25 overs bowled to the side batting second. A Man of the Series award was not made.

30 September 2002
Scorecard

Sri Lanka; 222/7 (50 overs)	v	India; 38/1 (8.4 overs)
Mahela Jayawardene 77 (99); Zaheer Khan 3/44 (9 overs)		Virender Sehwag 25* (22); Chaminda Vaas 1/24 (4.4 overs)

No result
India and Sri Lanka are declared as joint winners
R. Premadasa Stadium, Colombo
Umpires: Steve Bucknor (WI) and David Shepherd (Eng)

- Sri Lanka won the toss and elected to bat.
- Due to heavy rains, the match was washed out twice.
- India and Sri Lanka were declared as joint winners.

== Criticism ==
The International Cricket Council's (ICC) rule for One Day International (ODI) cricket at that time, "a minimum of 25 overs have to be bowled to the side batting second to constitute a match", was criticized by former Indian cricketers. Former Indian wicket-keeper Farokh Engineer rejected the rule saying that it "doesn't make any sense". Another former Test cricketer Sanjay Manjrekar said that the ICC "should look at that rule straight away and change it", and the "obvious thing is to continue from where they left off".

== Tournament statistics ==
Indian opener Virender Sehwag was the highest run-scorer of the tournament. He scored 271 runs from four innings at the average of over 90, including a century and a fifty. His highest score was 126 runs against England. Followed by Sri Lankan captain Sanath Jayasuriya who scored 254 runs. Herschelle Gibbs of South Africa scored two centuries in the tournament. He also had the highest average of 120 from three innings. Zimbabwean Andy Flower's score of 145 against India was the highest individual score in a match.

Sri Lankan off-spinner Muttiah Muralitharan was the most successful bowler of the tournament. He took ten wickets in three innings, while his best bowling figures were four wickets for 15 runs against the Netherlands at the R. Premadasa Stadium. The only five-wicket haul of the tournament was taken by Australian fast bowler Glenn McGrath. He took five wickets for 37 runs against New Zealand at the Sinhalese Sports Club Ground.

Zimbabwean Alistair Campbell took five catches in two matches, and Sri Lankan wicketkeeper Kumar Sangakkara had the most dismissals with seven—five catches and two stumpings.
