= Sinhalese Sports Club Cricket Ground =

Cricket ground in Sri Lanka

- Maitland Place
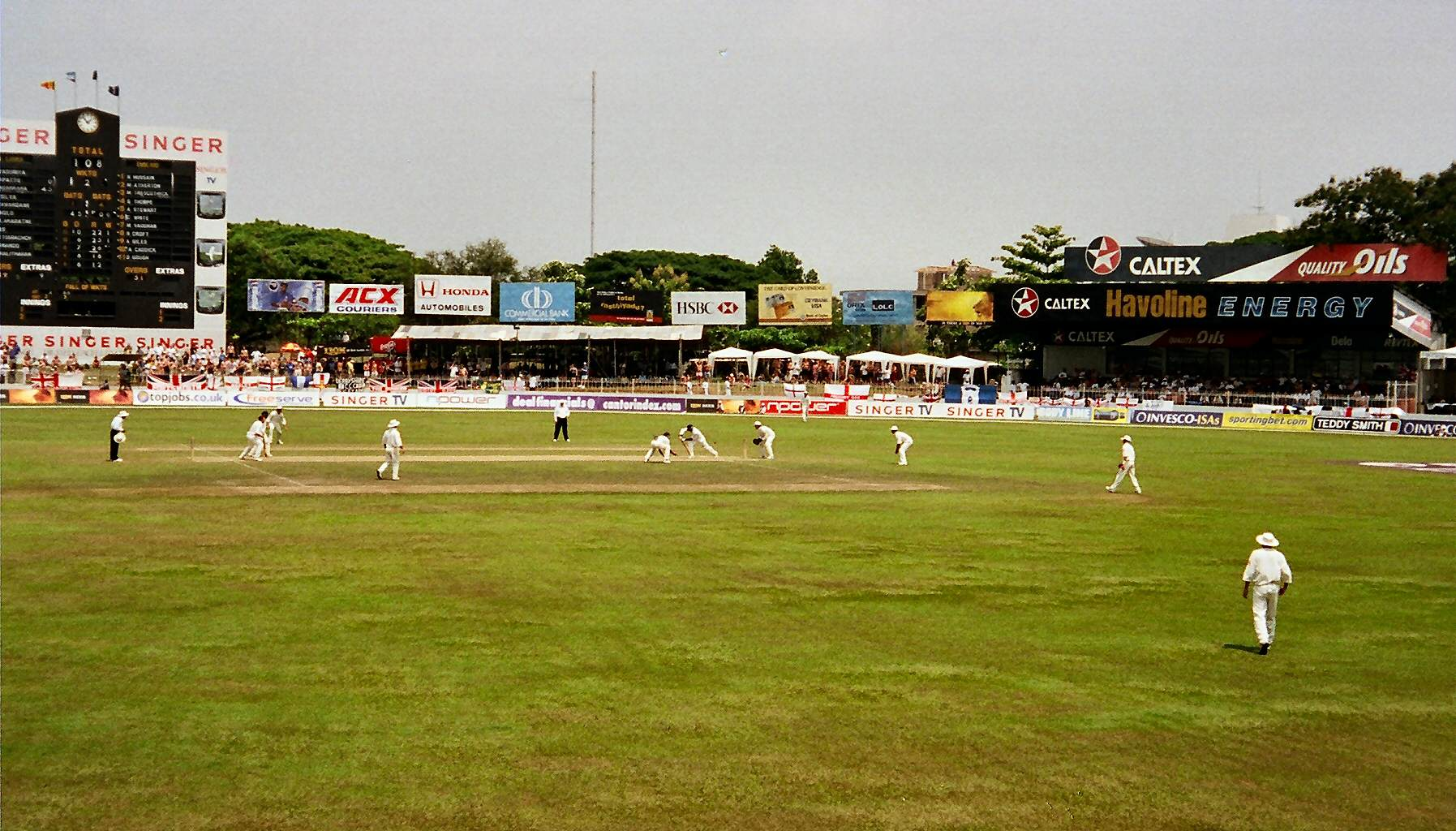
- A Test match in March 2001 between Sri Lanka and England
- Interactive map of Sinhalese Sports Club Cricket Ground

Ground information
- Location: Cinnamon Gardens, Colombo
- Country: Sri Lanka
- Coordinates: 6°54′21″N 79°52′10″E
- Establishment: 1952; 74 years ago
- Capacity: 10,000
- Owner: Sinhalese Sports Club (SSC)
- Tenants: Sri Lanka Cricket
- End names
- Tennis Courts End; Vidhya Mawatha End

International information
- First men's Test: 16–21 March 1984: Sri Lanka v New Zealand
- Last men's Test: 23–27 August 2026: Sri Lanka v India
- First men's ODI: 13 February 1982: Sri Lanka v England
- Last men's ODI: 22 February 2020: Sri Lanka v West Indies
- First men's T20I: 3 February 2010: Canada v Ireland
- Last men's T20I: 18 February 2026: Pakistan v Namibia
- First women's ODI: 25 November 1997: Sri Lanka v Netherlands
- Last women's ODI: 4 May 2023: Sri Lanka v Bangladesh
- First women's T20I: 24 April 2011: Sri Lanka v Netherlands
- Last women's T20I: 12 May 2023: Sri Lanka v Bangladesh

Team information
Sinhalese Sports Club	(1974–present)
Sri Lanka national cricket team	(1982–present)
- As of 18 February 2026; Source: Cricinfo

The Sinhalese Sports Club Cricket Ground (SSC Cricket Ground) (Sinhala: සිංහල ක්‍රිඩා සමාජ ක්‍රීඩාංගනය; Tamil: சிங்களவர் விளையாட்டுக் கழக அரங்கம்) is one of the most famous cricket grounds in Sri Lanka, and the headquarters of Sri Lanka Cricket, the controlling body of cricket in Sri Lanka. The ground is sometimes described as "the Lord's of Sri Lanka", It hosts the most domestic finals and is an important international cricket venue. The ground staged its first Test in 1984 against New Zealand and its first One Day International in 1982 against England. The Sri Lankan team has an impressive record here. Out of 38 Tests played at the SSC as of January 2015, Sri Lanka has won 18 matches, and drawn 14, with only 6 losses.

== History ==
In 1899, a combined school cricket team, composed mainly of cricketers from Royal College, S. Thomas' College and Wesley College beat Colts Cricket Club by a one run. A decision was made to form an all-Sinhalese club, and thus Singhalese Sports Club was founded. The club leased land in Victoria Park with sandy soil and covered with cinnamon trees.

In 1952 the club leased another 20 acres (81,000 m^{2}) and moved to its present location in Maitland Place, which had been used as an aerodrome by the allied forces in World War II.

== Ground ==
The pavilion of the ground was built in 1956 with the sponsorship of Donovan Andree, a leading nightclub entrepreneur. A giant scoreboard and sightscreens were built in the mid-70s. Later the current scoreboard was built. The ground also has a media center and commentary box with modern facilities. Various sponsors including Lankabell, Seylan Bank and HSBC have built stands bearing their brands. There are two grass embankments for the spectators.

The SSC Stadium underwent a reconstruction project in preparation to host 5 matches for the 2026 Men's T20 World Cup at the cost of Rs. 1.8 billion. As stated by SLC, the upgraded lighting system employs state-of-the-art LED technology that complies with international sports and broadcasting requirements. It incorporates high-performance LED fixtures with a 5,700 Kelvin correlated color temperature and a color rendering index of 90, delivering superior visibility for players, match officials, and spectators. The floodlighting setup includes 630 LED fixtures on six high-mast towers, providing consistent illumination with reduced glare. A smart control system offers multiple lighting modes to enhance the viewing experience.

Additional developments at the SSC include the refurbishment of players’ dressing rooms to better align with international standards, the construction of new office spaces for match referees, third umpires, and anti-corruption officials, as well as upgrades to overall stadium facilities. And spectator capacity of the stadium will be increased gradually as part of the long-term development plan for the venue.

== Highlights ==
In 1992 Australian tour of Sri Lanka, Sri Lanka lost the SSC Test match to Australia by 16 runs after being set a target of only 181 runs. This is one of Sri Lanka's narrowest defeats in Test cricket. Shane Warne took three wickets in thirteen balls; this was his first notable performance in Test cricket.

In the 2001–02 Asian Test Championship, Mohammed Ashraful of Bangladesh become the youngest cricketer to score a Test hundred, one day before his 17th birthday. However Bangladesh went on to lose the match by an innings and 137 runs.

Chaminda Vaas took 8 wickets for 19 runs in 2001–02 against Zimbabwe, the best bowling performance in a One Day International match. The Zimbabwean total of 38 was the lowest team innings total in ODIs at that point of time.

Kumar Sangakkara and Mahela Jayawardene shared a partnership of 624 runs against South Africa in 2006–07 season, the highest partnership for any wicket in Test and first class cricket.

In 2026, the ground was selected as a venue for the ICC Men's T20 World Cup, marking a significant return to hosting major global tournaments following extensive infrastructure upgrades.

== Ground Figures ==
=== Key ===
- P Matches Played
- H Matches Won by Home Side
- T Matches Won by Touring Side
- N Matches Won by Neutral Side
- D/N/T Matches Drawn/No Result/Tied

Ground Figures
Format	P	H	T	N	D/N/T	Inaugural Match
Test matches	43	21	8	0	14	16 March 1984
One-Day Internationals	60	23	11	19	7	13 February 1982
Twenty20 Internationals	2	0	0	2	0	3 February 2010

Updated 5 February 2024

== Cricket World Cup matches ==
=== 1996 Cricket World Cup ===
21 February 1996
scorecard

Zimbabwe; 228/6 (50 overs)	v	Sri Lanka; 229/4 (37 overs)
Alistair Campbell 75 (102); Chaminda Vaas 2/30 (10 overs)		Aravinda de Silva 91 (86); Heath Streak 3/60 (10 overs)

Sri Lanka won by 6 wickets (with 78 balls remaining)
Singhalese Sports Club Cricket Ground, Colombo, Sri Lanka
Umpires: Steve Dunne and Mahboob Shah
Player of the match: Aravinda de Silva (Sri)

- Zimbabwe won the toss and elected to bat first.

== ICC Champions Trophy matches ==
The 2002 ICC Champions Trophy was held in Sri Lanka. Six group matches played in SSC. Other matches played in R Premadasa Stadium.

=== 2002 ICC Champions Trophy ===
13 September 2002
Scorecard

West Indies; 238/8 (50 overs)	v	South Africa; 242/8 (49 overs)
Chris Gayle 49 (55); Jacques Kallis 2/41 (9 overs)		Jonty Rhodes 61 (70); Mervyn Dillon 4/60 (10 overs)

South Africa won by 2 wickets
Singhalese Sports Club Cricket Ground, Colombo, Sri Lanka
Umpires: David Shepherd and Srinivasaraghavan Venkataraghavan
Player of the match: Jonty Rhodes (RSA)

- South Africa won the toss and elected to bowl first.

15 September 2002
Scorecard

Australia; 296/7 (50 overs)	v	New Zealand; 132 (26.2 overs)
Damien Martyn 73 (87); Jacob Oram 2/60 (10 overs)		Shane Bond 26 (22); Glenn McGrath 5/37 (7 overs)

Australia won by 164 runs
Singhalese Sports Club Cricket Ground, Colombo, Sri Lanka
Umpires: Dave Orchard and Russell Tiffin
Player of the match: Glenn McGrath (Aus)

- Australia won the toss and elected to bat first.

17 September 2002
Scorecard

West Indies; 261/6 (50 overs)	v	Kenya; 232 (49.1 overs)
Brian Lara 111 (120); Steve Tikolo 2/49 (7 overs)		Steve Tikolo 93 (91); Pedro Collins 3/18 (9.1 overs)

West Indies won by 29 runs
Singhalese Sports Club Cricket Ground, Colombo, Sri Lanka
Umpires: Daryl Harper and Srinivasaraghavan Venkataraghavan
Player of the match: Brian Lara (WI)

- West Indies won the toss and elected to bat first.

19 September 2002
Scorecard

Bangladesh; 129 (45.2 overs)	v	Australia; 133/1 (20.4 overs)
Alok Kapali 45 (75); Jason Gillespie 3/20 (10 overs)		Matthew Hayden 67* (70); Mohammad Rafique 1/32 (5 overs)

Australia won by 9 wickets
Singhalese Sports Club Cricket Ground, Colombo, Sri Lanka
Umpires: Asoka de Silva and Russell Tiffin
Player of the match: Jason Gillespie (Aus)

- Bangladesh won the toss and elected to bat first.

21 September 2002
Scorecard

Netherlands; 136 (50 overs)	v	Pakistan; 142/1 (16.2 overs)
Roland Lefebvre 32 (70); Shahid Afridi 3/18 (10 overs)		Imran Nazir 59 (40); Feiko Kloppenburg 1/23 (2 overs)

Pakistan won by 9 wickets
Singhalese Sports Club Cricket Ground, Colombo, Sri Lanka
Umpires: Rudi Koertzen and Dave Orchard
Player of the match: Shahid Afridi (Pak)

- The Netherlands won the toss and elected to bat first.

23 September 2002
Scorecard

New Zealand; 244/9 (50 overs)	v	Bangladesh; 77 (19.3 overs)
Mathew Sinclair 70 (122); Mohammad Ashraful 3/26 (5 overs)		Tushar Imran 20 (16); Shane Bond 4/21 (5 overs)

New Zealand won by 167 runs
Singhalese Sports Club Cricket Ground, Colombo, Sri Lanka
Umpires: Asoka de Silva and David Shepherd
Player of the match: Shane Bond (NZ)

- Bangladesh won the toss and elected to bowl first.

== See also ==
- List of Test cricket grounds
- List of international cricket five-wicket hauls at the Sinhalese Sports Club Ground
