= Netherlands cricket team in Barbados in 2001 =

The Netherlands national cricket team toured Barbados in June 2001 and played two matches against the Barbadian team. The touring Dutch team was captained by Roland Lefebvre.

== Matches ==
24 June 2001
Scorecard

Netherlands; 196 (49.4 overs)	v	Barbados; 191/7 (46 overs)
Klaas-Jan van Noortwijk 56; Shirley Clarke 2/18 (5.4 overs)		Alcindo Holder 46; Asim Khan 3/30 (10 overs)

Barbados won by 3 wickets (D/L method)
Kensington Oval, Bridgetown

- Barbados won the toss and decided to field
- Barbados had a reduced target of 191 runs from 47 overs

25 June 2001
Scorecard

Netherlands; 147 (45.4 overs)	v	Barbados; 150/6 (36.5 overs)
Klaas-Jan van Noortwijk 29; Ryan Nurse 4/40 (10 overs)		Dale Richards 76; Roland Lefebvre 1/7 (5 overs)

Barbados won by 4 wickets
Kensington Oval, Bridgetown

- Toss not known
