= Ruud Nijman =

Dutch cricketer (born 1982)

Personal information
- Full name: Ruud Gerard Nijman
- Born: 15 June 1982 (age 44); Groningen
- Batting: Right-handed
- Bowling: Right-arm medium-fast

International information
- National side: Netherlands
- Only ODI (cap 42): 19 April 2009 v Kenya

Career statistics
Competition	ODI	FC	LA
Matches	1	3	3
Runs scored	0	30	25
Batting average	–	7.50	12.50
100s/50s	–	0/0	0/0
Top score	–	23	23
Balls bowled	49	288	133
Wickets	3	1	4
Bowling average	10.33	156.00	28.25
5 wickets in innings	0	0	0
10 wickets in match	0	0	0
Best bowling	3/31	1/43	3/31
Catches/stumpings	0/–	0/–	1/–
- Source: ESPNcricinfo, 16 January 2011

Ruud Gerard Nijman (born 15 June 1982) is a Dutch cricket player.

== Cricket career ==
Nijman was included in the Netherlands national cricket team for the 2003 Cricket World Cup but did not play a match.

Nijman made his one-day international debut for the Netherlands against Kenya in Potchefstroom in 2009.

In February 2010 he made his first-class cricket debut in a match between the Netherlands and Kenya in Nairobi.
