= Nick Statham =

Dutch cricketer (born 1975)

Personal information
- Full name: Nick Alexander Statham
- Born: 15 March 1975 (age 51); The Hague, Netherlands
- Batting: Right-handed
- Bowling: Right-arm offbreak

International information
- National side: Netherlands (2003-2009)
- ODI debut (cap 24): 16 February 2003 v England
- Last ODI: 11 July 2009 v Canada
- ODI shirt no.: 44

Career statistics
Competition	ODI	FC	LA
Matches	3	8	21
Runs scored	7	258	117
Batting average	2.33	17.20	6.88
100s/50s	0/0	0/2	0/0
Top score	7	62*	37
Balls bowled	–	6	60
Wickets	–	0	1
Bowling average	–	-	72.00
5 wickets in innings	–	0	0
10 wickets in match	-	0	0
Best bowling	–	-	1/60
Catches/stumpings	0/0	4/0	5/0
- Source: Cricinfo, 19 May 2017

Nick Statham (born 15 March 1975 in The Hague) is a Dutch former cricketer. He is a right-handed batsman and a right-arm off break bowler.

Statham's List A career stretches back to 1999. He played for the Netherlands in the 2003 Cricket World Cup and for Hermes DVS.

== Sources ==
- Nick Statham at Cricinfo
