= 2003 Cricket World Cup =

International sports tournament

- Dates: 9 February – 23 March 2003
- Administrator: International Cricket Council
- Cricket format: One Day International
- Tournament format(s): Round-robin and Knockout
- Hosts: South Africa; Zimbabwe; Kenya
- Champions: Australia (3rd title)
- Runners-up: India
- Participants: 14
- Matches: 54
- Attendance: 626,845 (11,608 per match)
- Player of the series: (India) Sachin Tendulkar
- Most runs: (India) Sachin Tendulkar (673)
- Most wickets: (Sri Lanka) Chaminda Vaas (23)

The 2003 ICC Cricket World Cup was the eighth Cricket World Cup, organised by the International Cricket Council (ICC). It was co-hosted by South Africa, Zimbabwe and Kenya from 9 February to 23 March 2003. This edition of the World Cup was the first to be played in Africa. The tournament featured 14 teams, the largest number in the World Cup's history at the time, playing a total of 54 matches. It followed the format introduced in the 1999 Cricket World Cup, with the teams divided into two groups, and the top three in each group qualifying for the Super Sixes stage.

The tournament saw numerous upsets, with host South Africa, Pakistan, West Indies and England all being eliminated at the group stage (South Africa missed by 1 run after misreading the Duckworth-Lewis method rules). England forfeited their match with Zimbabwe, due to the political unrest in the country, which ultimately enabled Zimbabwe to reach the Super Sixes. Similarly, New Zealand forfeited their match with Kenya, due to security reasons which enabled the latter to reach the semi-finals, the only non-Test playing nation to do so. Another shock wave came two days after the tournament had started, when Shane Warne, at the time one of the game's leading spinners, was sent home in disgrace after testing positive for a banned substance.

The tournament was eventually won by Australia who won all 11 of their matches, beating India in the final played at the Wanderers Stadium in Johannesburg. This was also Australia's third World Cup win, the only team to do so. Pakistani player Shoaib Akhtar also set a world record, becoming the fastest bowler in the history of cricket, delivering a record top speed of 161.3 km/h (100.23 mph) in a pool match against England.

== Teams and squads ==
Fourteen teams played in the 2003 World Cup, the largest number of teams to play in a Cricket World Cup at the time. The 10 Test playing nations automatically qualified for the tournament including the recently appointed member Bangladesh, while Kenya also qualified automatically due to their full One Day International status. The other three spots were filled by the top three teams in the 2001 ICC Trophy in Canada, which served as a qualifying tournament. These teams were, respectively, the Netherlands who won the ICC Trophy, Canada and Namibia. This was Namibia's World Cup debut, while the Netherlands and Canada were both appearing in the tournament for the second time, having previously appeared in 1996 and 1979 respectively.

The format used in the 1999 World Cup was retained, with the 14 teams divided into two groups of seven, and the top three from each group qualifying for the Super Sixes stage, carrying forward the results they had achieved against other qualifiers from their group. The top four teams in the Super Sixes qualified for the semi-finals, and the winners of those matches contested the final.

Full Members
Bangladesh	Australia
England	India
New Zealand	Pakistan
South Africa	Sri Lanka
West Indies	Zimbabwe
Associate Members
Kenya	Canada
Namibia	Netherlands

== Opening ceremony ==
The opening ceremony was held on 8 February 2003 at Newlands Cricket Ground, Cape Town and was attended by around 25,000 fans. South African President Thabo Mbeki officially declared the tournament open. Tumi Makgabo served as the official master of ceremonies. Marc Lottering, Johnny Clegg, Hugh Masekela and Nothembi Mkhwebane were main performers at the ceremony.

== Venues ==
Cities	Venues	Capacity	Matches
Johannesburg, South Africa	Wanderers Stadium	34,000	5
Durban, South Africa	Sahara Stadium Kingsmead	25,000	5
Cape Town, South Africa	Newlands Cricket Ground	25,000	5
Centurion, South Africa	Centurion Park	23,000	5
Bloemfontein, South Africa	Goodyear Park	20,000	5
Port Elizabeth, South Africa	St George's Oval	19,000	5
Potchefstroom, South Africa	North West Cricket Stadium	18,000	3
East London, South Africa	Buffalo Park	16,000	3
Kimberley, South Africa	De Beers Diamond Oval	11,000	3
Paarl, South Africa	Boland Park	10,000	3
Benoni, South Africa	Willowmoore Park	20,000	2
Pietermaritzburg, South Africa	Pietermaritzburg Oval	12,000	2
Harare, Zimbabwe	Harare Sports Club	10,000	3
Bulawayo, Zimbabwe	Queens Sports Club	9,000	3
Nairobi, Kenya	Nairobi Gymkhana Club	8,000	2

Venues in South Africa	Venues in Zimbabwe	Venues in Kenya

== Match officials ==
Six match referees and 19 umpires were selected to stand in the tournament.

Match referees
Referee
(Cricket West Indies) Clive Lloyd
(Sri Lanka) Ranjan Madugalle
(South Africa) Mike Procter
(Pakistan) Wasim Raja
(India) Gundappa Viswanath
(South Africa) Denis Lindsay

Umpires
Umpire	Panel
(Cricket West Indies) Steve Bucknor	Elite
(Australia) Daryl Harper	Elite
(South Africa) Rudi Koertzen	Elite
(South Africa) Dave Orchard	Elite
(England) David Shepherd	Elite
(Sri Lanka) Asoka de Silva	Elite
(Zimbabwe) Russell Tiffin	Elite
(India) Srinivas Venkataraghavan	Elite
(Zimbabwe) Kevan Barbour	International
(New Zealand) Billy Bowden	International
(Pakistan) Aleem Dar	International
(Pakistan) Nadeem Ghauri	International
(Australia) Darrell Hair	International
(India) Arani Jayaprakash	International
(South Africa) Brian Jerling	International
(England) Neil Mallender	International
(Australia) Simon Taufel	International
(England) Peter Willey	International
(Sri Lanka) Tyron Wijewardene	International

== Pool stage ==
The top three teams from each pool qualify for the next stage, carrying forward the points already scored against fellow qualifiers, plus a quarter of the points scored against the teams that failed to qualify.

=== Pool A ===
Pos	Team	Pld	W	L	NR	T	NRR	Pts	PCF
1	Australia	6	6	0	0	0	2.05	24	12
2	India	6	5	1	0	0	1.11	20	8
3	Zimbabwe	6	3	2	1	0	0.50	14	3.5
4	England	6	3	3	0	0	0.82	12	–
5	Pakistan	6	2	3	1	0	0.23	10	–
6	Netherlands	6	1	5	0	0	−1.45	4	–
7	Namibia	6	0	6	0	0	−2.96	0	–

Source: Points Table

10 February 2003
Scorecard

Zimbabwe; 340/2 (50 overs)	v	Namibia; 104/5 (25.1 overs)
Craig Wishart 172* (151); Lennie Louw 1/60 (10 overs)		Danie Keulder 27 (46); Guy Whittall 2/20 (5 overs)

Zimbabwe won by 86 runs (D/L method)
Harare Sports Club, Harare
Umpires: Dave Orchard (SA) and Simon Taufel (Aus)
Player of the match: Craig Wishart (Zim)

- Namibia won the toss and elected to field.
- Rain interrupted the innings of Namibia and eventually the match was called off with Zimbabwe winning by 86 runs via D/L method
- Points: Zimbabwe 4, Namibia 0

11 February 2003
Scorecard

Australia; 310/8 (50 overs)	v	Pakistan; 228 (44.3 overs)
Andrew Symonds 143* (125); Wasim Akram 3/64 (10 overs)		Rashid Latif 33 (23); Ian Harvey 4/58 (9.3 overs)

Australia won by 82 runs
Wanderers Stadium, Johannesburg
Umpires: Asoka de Silva (SL) and David Shepherd (Eng)
Player of the match: Andrew Symonds (Aus)

- Pakistan won the toss elected to field.
- Points: Australia 4, Pakistan 0
- Pakistan were fined 1 over for a slow over rate.

12 February 2003
Scorecard

India; 204 (48.5 overs)	v	Netherlands; 136 (48.1 overs)
Sachin Tendulkar 52 (72); Tim de Leede 4/35 (9.5 overs)		Daan van Bunge 62 (116); Anil Kumble 4/32 (10 overs)

India won by 68 runs
Boland Park, Paarl
Umpires: Daryl Harper (Aus) and Peter Willey (Eng)
Player of the match: Tim de Leede (Ned)

- India won the toss and elected to bat.
- Points: India 4, Netherlands 0.

13 February 2003
Scorecard

Zimbabwe	v	England

Zimbabwe won (walkover without a ball bowled)
Harare Sports Club, Harare
Umpires: Dave Orchard (SA) and Steve Bucknor (WI)

- No toss
- Points: Zimbabwe 4, England 0
- England forfeited the match due to safety concerns

15 February 2003
Scorecard

India; 125 (41.4 overs)	v	Australia; 128/1 (22.2 overs)
Sachin Tendulkar 36 (59); Jason Gillespie 3/13 (10 overs)		Adam Gilchrist 48 (61); Anil Kumble 1/24 (7 overs)

Australia won by 9 wickets
Centurion Park, Centurion
Umpires: Asoka de Silva (SL) and David Shepherd (Eng)
Player of the match: Jason Gillespie (Aus)

- India won the toss and elected to bat.
- Points: Australia 4, India 0.

16 February 2003
Scorecard

Netherlands; 142/9 (50 overs)	v	England; 144/4 (23.2 overs)
Tim de Leede 58* (96); James Anderson 4/25 (10 overs)		Michael Vaughan 51 (47); Daan van Bunge 3/16 (3 overs)

England won by 6 wickets
Buffalo Park, East London
Umpires: Darell Hair (Aus) and Rudi Koertzen (SA)
Player of the match: James Anderson (Eng)

- England won the toss and elected to field.
- Points: England 4, Netherlands 0
- Nick Statham (Netherlands) made his ODI debut

16 February 2003
Scorecard

Pakistan; 255/9 (50 overs)	v	Namibia; 84 (17.4 overs)
Saleem Elahi 63 (100); Bjorn Kotze 2/51 (10 overs)		Bjorn Kotze 24* (29); Wasim Akram 5/28 (9 overs)

Pakistan won by 171 runs
De Beers Diamond Oval, Kimberley
Umpires: Dave Orchard (SA) and Neil Mallender (Eng)
Player of the match: Wasim Akram (Pak)

- Pakistan won the toss and elected to bat.
- Points: Pakistan 4, Namibia 0

19 February 2003
Scorecard

India; 255/7 (50 overs)	v	Zimbabwe; 172 (44.4 overs)
Sachin Tendulkar 81 (91); Grant Flower 2/14 (6 overs)		Tatenda Taibu 29* (44); Sourav Ganguly 3/22 (5 overs)

India won by 83 runs
Harare Sports Club, Harare
Umpires: Asoka de Silva (SL) and Rudi Koertzen (SA)
Player of the match: Sachin Tendulkar (Ind)

- Zimbabwe won the toss and elected to field.
- Points: India 4, Zimbabwe 0.

19 February 2003
Scorecard

England; 272 (50 overs)	v	Namibia; 217/9 (50 overs)
Alec Stewart 60 (77); Rudi van Vuuren 5/43 (10 overs)		Jan-Berrie Burger 85 (86); Ronnie Irani 3/30 (8 overs)

England won by 55 runs
St George's Park Cricket Ground, Port Elizabeth
Umpires: Simon Taufel (Aus) and S Venkataraghavan (Ind)
Player of the match: Jan-Berrie Burger (Nam)

- Namibia won the toss and elected to field.
- Points: England 4, Namibia 0

20 February 2003
Scorecard

Australia; 170/2 (36 overs)	v	Netherlands; 122 (30.2 overs)
Damien Martyn 67* (76); Tim de Leede 2/34 (7 overs)		Tim de Leede 24 (38); Andy Bichel 3/13 (3 overs)

Australia won by 75 runs (D/L method)
Senwes Park, Potchefstroom
Umpires: Dave Orchard (SA) and Peter Willey (Eng)
Player of the match: Damien Martyn (Aus)

- Netherlands won the toss elected to field.
- Match reduced to 36 overs per side due to rain
- Points: Australia 4, Netherlands 0

22 February 2003
Scorecard

England; 246/8 (50 overs)	v	Pakistan; 134 (31 overs)
Paul Collingwood 66* (73); Saqlain Mushtaq 2/44 (10 overs)		Shoaib Akhtar 43 (16); James Anderson 4/29 (10 overs)

England won by 112 runs
Newlands Cricket Ground, Cape Town
Umpires: Brian Jerling (SA) and Rudi Koertzen (SA)
Player of the match: James Anderson (Eng)

- England won the toss and elected to bat.
- Points: England 4, Pakistan 0

23 February 2003
Scorecard

India; 311/2 (50 overs)	v	Namibia; 130 (42.3 overs)
Sachin Tendulkar 152 (151); Rudi van Vuuren 2/53 (10 overs)		Jan-Berrie Burger 29 (30); Yuvraj Singh 4/6 (4.3 overs)

India won by 181 runs
City Oval, Pietermaritzburg
Umpires: Aleem Dar (Pak) and David Shepherd (Eng)
Player of the match: Sachin Tendulkar (Ind)

- Namibia won the toss and elected to field.
- Points: India 4, Namibia 0

24 February 2003
Scorecard

Zimbabwe; 246/9 (50 overs)	v	Australia; 248/3 (47.3 overs)
Andy Flower 62 (91); Brad Hogg 3/46 (8 overs)		Adam Gilchrist 61 (64); Dougie Marillier 1/32 (10 overs)

Australia won by 7 wickets
Queens Sports Club, Bulawayo
Umpires: Billy Bowden (NZ) and Dave Orchard (SA)
Player of the match: Andy Blignaut (Zim)

- Zimbabwe won the toss and elected to bat.
- Points: Australia 4, Zimbabwe 0

25 February 2003
Scorecard

Pakistan; 253/9 (50 overs)	v	Netherlands; 156 (39.3 overs)
Mohammad Yousuf 58 (59); Tim de Leede 2/53 (10 overs)		Daan van Bunge 31 (60); Wasim Akram 3/24 (8.3 overs)

Pakistan won by 97 runs
Boland Park, Paarl
Umpires: S Venkataraghavan (Ind) and Steve Bucknor (WI)
Player of the match: Mohammad Yousuf (Pak)

- Netherlands won the toss and elected to field.
- Points: Pakistan 4, Netherlands 0

26 February 2003 (D/N)
Scorecard

India; 250/9 (50 overs)	v	England; 168 (45.3 overs)
Rahul Dravid 62 (72); Andy Caddick 3/69 (10 overs)		Andrew Flintoff 64 (73); Ashish Nehra 6/23 (10 overs)

India won by 82 runs
Kingsmead Cricket Ground, Durban
Umpires: Rudi Koertzen (SA) and Simon Taufel (Aus)
Player of the match: Ashish Nehra (Ind)

- India won the toss and elected to bat.
- Points: India 4, England 0
- Ronnie Irani played his last ODI game.

27 February 2003
Scorecard

Australia; 301/6 (50 overs)	v	Namibia; 45 (14 overs)
Matthew Hayden 88 (73); Louis Burger 3/39 (10 overs)		Deon Kotze 10 (14); Glenn McGrath 7/15 (7 overs)

Australia won by 256 runs
Senwes Park, Potchefstroom
Umpires: Billy Bowden (NZ) and Russell Tiffin (Zim)
Player of the match: Glenn McGrath (Aus)

- Australia won the toss and elected to bat.
- Points: Australia 4, Namibia 0

28 February 2003
Scorecard

Zimbabwe; 301/8 (50 overs)	v	Netherlands; 202/9 (50 overs)
Andy Flower 71 (72); Feiko Kloppenburg 2/40 (10 overs)		Roland Lefebvre 30 (23); Brian Murphy 3/44 (10 overs)

Zimbabwe won by 99 runs
Queens Sports Club, Bulawayo
Umpires: Steve Bucknor (WI) and Tyron Wijewardene (SL)
Player of the match: Heath Streak (Zim)

- Netherlands won the toss and elected to field.
- Points: Zimbabwe 4, Netherlands 0

1 March 2003
Scorecard

Pakistan; 273/7 (50 overs)	v	India; 276/4 (45.4 overs)
Saeed Anwar 101 (126); Zaheer Khan 2/46 (10 overs)		Sachin Tendulkar 98 (75); Waqar Younis 2/71 (8.4 overs)

India won by 6 wickets
Centurion Park, Centurion
Umpires: David Shepherd (Eng) and Rudi Koertzen (SA)
Player of the match: Sachin Tendulkar (Ind)

- Pakistan won the toss and elected to bat.
- Points: India 4, Pakistan 0

2 March 2003
Scorecard

England; 204/8 (50 overs)	v	Australia; 208/8 (49.4 overs)
Alec Stewart 46 (92); Andy Bichel 7/20 (10 overs)		Michael Bevan 74* (126); Andy Caddick 4/35 (9 overs)

Australia won by 2 wickets
St George's Park Cricket Ground, Port Elizabeth
Umpires: Aleem Dar (Pak) and Russell Tiffin (Zim)
Player of the match: Andy Bichel (Aus)

- England won the toss and elected to bat.
- Points: Australia 4, England 0
- Alec Stewart, Andy Caddick and Nick Knight played their last ODI game.

3 March 2003
Scorecard

Netherlands; 314/4 (50 overs)	v	Namibia; 250 (46.5 overs)
Klaas-Jan van Noortwijk 134* (129); Louis Burger 2/49 (10 overs)		Gavin Murgatroyd 52 (62); Adeel Raja 4/42 (8.5 overs)

Netherlands won by 64 runs
Goodyear Park, Bloemfontein
Umpires: Daryl Harper (Aus) and Nadeem Ghauri (Pak)
Player of the match: Feiko Kloppenburg (Ned)

- Netherlands won the toss and elected to bat.
- Points: Netherlands 4, Namibia 0

4 March 2003
Scorecard

Pakistan; 73/3 (14 overs)	v	Zimbabwe
Saeed Anwar 40* (45); Heath Streak 1/25 (7 overs)

No result
Queens Sports Club, Bulawayo
Umpires: Asoka de Silva (SL) and Billy Bowden (NZ)

- Pakistan won the toss and elected to bat.
- The match started after a delay due to rain and was suspended twice. It was eventually called off due to rain after the 14th over of the Pakistani innings
- Match shortened to 38 overs per side
- Wasim Akram, Waqar Younis, and Saeed Anwar played their last ODI game.
- Points: Pakistan 2, Zimbabwe 2

=== Pool B ===
Pos	Team	Pld	W	L	NR	T	NRR	Pts	PCF
1	Sri Lanka	6	4	1	0	1	1.20	18	7.5
2	Kenya	6	4	2	0	0	−0.69	16	10
3	New Zealand	6	4	2	0	0	0.99	16	4
4	West Indies	6	3	2	1	0	1.10	14	—
5	South Africa	6	3	2	0	1	1.73	14	—
6	Canada	6	1	5	0	0	−1.99	4	—
7	Bangladesh	6	0	5	1	0	−2.05	2	—

Source: Points Table

9 February 2003 (D/N)
Scorecard

West Indies; 278/5 (50 overs)	v	South Africa; 275/9 (49 overs)
Brian Lara 116 (134); Makhaya Ntini 2/37 (10 overs)		Gary Kirsten 69 (92); Mervyn Dillon 2/47 (10 overs)

West Indies won by 3 runs
Newlands Cricket Ground, Cape Town
Umpires: Daryl Harper (Aus) and S Venkataraghavan (Ind)
Player of the match: Brian Lara (WI)

- West Indies won the toss and elected to bat.
- Points: West Indies 4, South Africa 0
- South Africa were fined 1 over for a slow over rate

10 February 2003
Scorecard

Sri Lanka; 272/7 (50 overs)	v	New Zealand; 225 (45.3 overs)
Sanath Jayasuriya 120 (125); Nathan Astle 3/34 (7 overs)		Scott Styris 141 (125); Russel Arnold 3/47 (8.5 overs)

Sri Lanka won by 47 runs
Goodyear Park, Bloemfontein
Umpires: Neil Mallender (Eng) and Steve Bucknor (WI)
Player of the match: Sanath Jayasuriya (SL)

- New Zealand won the toss and elected to field.
- Points: Sri Lanka 4, New Zealand 0

11 February 2003 (D/N)
Scorecard

Canada; 180 (49.1 overs)	v	Bangladesh; 120 (28 overs)
Ian Billcliff 42 (63); Sanwar Hossain 2/26 (10 overs)		Sanwar Hossain 25 (24); Austin Codrington 5/27 (9 overs)

Canada won by 60 runs
Kingsmead Cricket Ground, Durban
Umpires: Aleem Dar (Pak) and Brian Jerling (SA)
Player of the match: Austin Codrington (Can)

- Canada won the toss and elected to bat.
- Points: Canada 4, Bangladesh 0

12 February 2003
Scorecard

Kenya; 140 (38 overs)	v	South Africa; 142/0 (21.2 overs)
Ravi Shah 60 (87); Lance Klusener 4/16 (8 overs)		Herschelle Gibbs 87* (66)

South Africa won by 10 wickets
North West Cricket Stadium, Potchefstroom
Umpires: Kevan Barbour (Zim) and Tyron Wijewardene (SL)
Player of the match: Lance Klusener (SA)

- Kenya won the toss and elected to bat.
- Points: South Africa 4, Kenya 0
- Jonty Rhodes played his last ODI game.

13 February 2003
Scorecard

New Zealand; 241/7 (50 overs)	v	West Indies; 221 (49.4 overs)
Nathan Astle 46 (70); Wavell Hinds 3/35 (10 overs)		Ramnaresh Sarwan 75 (99); Andre Adams 4/44 (9.4 overs)

New Zealand won by 20 runs
St George's Park Cricket Ground, Port Elizabeth
Umpires: Darell Hair (Aus) and Rudi Koertzen (SA)
Player of the match: Andre Adams (NZ)

- West Indies won the toss and elected to field.
- Points: New Zealand 4, West Indies 0

14 February 2003
Scorecard

Bangladesh; 124 (31.1 overs)	v	Sri Lanka; 126/0 (21.1 overs)
Alok Kapali 32 (38); Chaminda Vaas 6/25 (9.1 overs)		Marvan Atapattu 69* (71)

Sri Lanka won by 10 wickets
City Oval, Pietermaritzburg
Umpires: Billy Bowden (NZ) and Russell Tiffin (Zim)
Player of the match: Chaminda Vaas (SL)

- Sri Lanka won the toss and elected to field.
- Points: Sri Lanka 4, Bangladesh 0
- Chaminda Vaas took a hat-trick with the first three balls of the match and became the third bowler to claim a World Cup hat-trick.
- Marvan Atapattu scored his 6,000th ODI run.

15 February 2003 (D/N)
Scorecard

Canada; 197 (49 overs)	v	Kenya; 198/6 (48.3 overs)
Ian Billcliff 71 (100); Thomas Odoyo 4/28 (10 overs)		Ravi Shah 61 (95); John Davison 3/15 (10 overs)

Kenya won by 4 wickets
Newlands Cricket Ground, Cape Town
Umpires: Arani Jayaprakash (Ind) and Nadeem Ghauri (Pak)
Player of the match: Thomas Odoyo (Ken)

- Canada won the toss and elected to bat.
- Points: Kenya 4, Canada 0

16 February 2003
Scorecard

South Africa; 306/6 (50 overs)	v	New Zealand; 229/1 (36.5 overs)
Herschelle Gibbs 143 (141); Jacob Oram 2/52 (8 overs)		Stephen Fleming 134* (132); Allan Donald 1/52 (5.5 overs)

New Zealand won by 9 wickets (D/L method)
New Wanderers Stadium, Johannesburg
Umpires: Peter Willey (Eng) and Steve Bucknor (WI)
Player of the match: Stephen Fleming (NZ)

- South Africa won the toss elected to bat.
- The New Zealand innings was reduced to 39 overs due to three stoppages for rain, and the target was revised to 226.
- Points: New Zealand 4, South Africa 0

18 February 2003
Scorecard

West Indies; 244/9 (50 overs)	v	Bangladesh; 32/2 (8.1 overs)
Ricardo Powell 50 (31); Manjurul Islam 2/37 (10 overs)		Ehsanul Haque 12 (24); Mervyn Dillon 1/13 (4.1 overs)

No result
Willowmoore Park, Benoni
Umpires: Brian Jerling (SA) and Russell Tiffin (Zim)

- Bangladesh won the toss and elected to field.
- Rain interrupted during the innings of West Indies and the match was eventually called off
- Points: West Indies 2, Bangladesh 2

19 February 2003
Scorecard

Canada; 36 (18.4 overs)	v	Sri Lanka; 37/1 (4.4 overs)
Joe Harris 9 (13); Prabath Nissanka 4/12 (7 overs)		Marvan Atapattu 24* (14); Sanjayan Thuraisingam 1/22 (2.4 overs)

Sri Lanka won by 9 wickets
Boland Park, Paarl
Umpires: David Shepherd (Eng) and Neil Mallender (Eng)
Player of the match: Prabath Nissanka (SL)

- Sri Lanka won the toss and elected to field.
- Points: Sri Lanka 4, Canada 0
- Prabath Nissanka recorded his best bowling figures in ODIs.
- Canada posted the lowest ever score in a One Day International.
- Marvan Atapattu (SL) scored his 6,000th ODI run.

21 February 2003
Scorecard

Kenya	v	New Zealand

Kenya won (walkover without a ball bowled)
Nairobi Gymkhana Club, Nairobi
Umpires: Daryl Harper (Aus) and Russell Tiffin (Zim)

- No toss
- Points: Kenya 4, New Zealand 0
- New Zealand forfeited the match due to safety concerns

22 February 2003
Scorecard

Bangladesh; 108 (35.1 overs)	v	South Africa; 109/0 (12 overs)
Khaled Mashud 29 (67); Makhaya Ntini 4/24 (7.1 overs)		Gary Kirsten 52* (32)

South Africa won by 10 wickets
Goodyear Park, Bloemfontein
Umpires: Billy Bowden (NZ) and S Venkataraghavan (Ind)
Player of the match: Makhaya Ntini (SA)

- South Africa won the toss and elected to field.
- Points: South Africa 4, Bangladesh 0

23 February 2003
Scorecard

Canada; 202 (42.5 overs)	v	West Indies; 206/3 (20.3 overs)
John Davison 111 (76); Vasbert Drakes 4/55(9.5 overs)		Brian Lara 73 (40); John Davison 1/36 (5 overs)

West Indies won by 7 wickets
Newlands Cricket Ground, Cape Town
Umpires: Dave Orchard (SA) and S Venkataraghavan (Ind)
Player of the match: John Davison (Can)

- West Indies won the toss and elected to field.
- Points: West Indies 4, Canada 0

24 February 2003
Scorecard

Kenya; 210/9 (50 overs)	v	Sri Lanka; 157 (45 overs)
Kennedy Otieno 60 (88); Muttiah Muralitharan 4/28 (10 overs)		Aravinda de Silva 41 (53); Collins Obuya 5/24 (10 overs)

Kenya won by 53 runs
Nairobi Gymkhana Club, Nairobi
Umpires: Daryl Harper (Aus) and Russell Tiffin (Zim)
Player of the match: Collins Obuya (Ken)

- Sri Lanka won the toss and elected to field.
- Points: Kenya 4, Sri Lanka 0
- This was Kenya's first victory over Sri Lanka in ODIs.

26 February 2003
Scorecard

Bangladesh; 198/7 (50 overs)	v	New Zealand; 199/3 (33.3 overs)
Mohammad Ashraful 56 (82); Jacob Oram 3/32 (10 overs)		Craig McMillan 75 (83); Khaled Mahmud 3/46 (10 overs)

New Zealand won by 7 wickets
De Beers Diamond Oval, Kimberley
Umpires: Darrell Hair (Aus) and David Shepherd (Eng)
Player of the match: Craig McMillan (NZ)

- Bangladesh won the toss elected to bat.
- Points: New Zealand 4, Bangladesh 0

27 February 2003
Scorecard

South Africa; 254/8 (50 overs)	v	Canada; 136/5 (50 overs)
Boeta Dippenaar 80 (118); Ashish Patel 3/41 (7 overs)		Ishwar Maraj 53* (155); Makhaya Ntini 2/19 (10 overs)

South Africa won by 118 runs
Buffalo Park, East London
Umpires: Daryl Harper (Aus) and Kevan Barbour (Zim)
Player of the match: Boeta Dippenaar (SA)

- Canada won the toss elected to field.
- Points: South Africa 4, Canada 0
- Allan Donald played his last ODI game.

28 February 2003 (D/N)
Scorecard

Sri Lanka; 228/6 (50 overs)	v	West Indies; 222/9 (50 overs)
Sanath Jayasuriya 66 (99); Vasbert Drakes 1/32 (10 overs)		Shivnarine Chanderpaul 65 (90); Chaminda Vaas 4/22 (10 overs)

Sri Lanka won by 6 runs
Newlands Cricket Ground, Cape Town
Umpires: Dave Orchard (SA) and S Venkataraghavan (Ind)
Player of the match: Chaminda Vaas (SL)

- Sri Lanka won the toss and elected to bat.
- Points: Sri Lanka 4, West Indies 0

1 March 2003
Scorecard

Kenya; 217/7 (50 overs)	v	Bangladesh; 185 (47.2 overs)
Maurice Odumbe 52* (46); Sanwar Hossain 3/49 (10 overs)		Tushar Imran 48 (81); Maurice Odumbe 4/38 (10 overs)

Kenya won by 32 runs
New Wanderers Stadium, Johannesburg
Umpires: Asoka de Silva (SL) and Neil Mallender (Eng)
Player of the match: Maurice Odumbe (Ken)

- Kenya won the toss and elected to bat.
- Points: Kenya 4, Bangladesh 0

3 March 2003
Scorecard

Canada; 196 (47 overs)	v	New Zealand; 197/5 (23 overs)
John Davison 75 (62); Jacob Oram 4/52 (10 overs)		Scott Styris 54* (38); John Davison 3/61 (10 overs)

New Zealand won by 5 wickets
Willowmoore Park, Benoni
Umpires: Arani Jayaprakash (Ind) and Brian Jerling (SA)
Player of the match: John Davison (Can)

- New Zealand won the toss elected to field.
- Points: New Zealand 4, Canada 0
- Gary Kirsten played his last ODI game.

3 March 2003 (D/N)
Scorecard

Sri Lanka; 268/9 (50 overs)	v	South Africa; 229/6 (45 overs)
Marvan Atapattu 124 (129); Jacques Kallis 3/41 (10 overs)		Herschelle Gibbs 73 (88); Aravinda de Silva 2/36 (8 overs)

Match tied (D/L method)
Kingsmead Cricket Ground, Durban
Umpires: S Venkataraghavan (Ind) and Steve Bucknor (WI)
Player of the match: Marvan Atapattu (SL)

- Sri Lanka won the toss and elected to bat.
- Points: Sri Lanka 2, South Africa 2

4 March 2003
Scorecard

West Indies; 246/7 (50 overs)	v	Kenya; 104 (35.5 overs)
Chris Gayle 119 (151); Maurice Odumbe 2/62 (10 overs)		Peter Ongondo 24 (43); Vasbert Drakes 5/33 (10 overs)

West Indies won by 142 runs
De Beers Diamond Oval, Kimberley
Umpires: David Shepherd (Eng) and Simon Taufel (Aus)
Player of the match: Vasbert Drakes (WI)

- West Indies won the toss and elected to bat.
- Points: West Indies 4, Kenya 0
- Carl Hooper played his last ODI game.

== Super Sixes ==
Teams who qualified for the Super Six stage only played against the teams from the other group; results against the other teams from the same group were carried forward to this stage.

Points carried forward (PCF)
Results	Against qualified teams	Against non-qualified teams
Win	4 points	1 point
No result / tie	2 points	0.5 point
Loss	0 point	0 point

Teams that advanced to the semi-finals are highlighted in green.

Pos	Team	Pld	W	L	NR	T	NRR	Pts	PCF
1	Australia	5	5	0	0	0	1.85	24	12
2	India	5	4	1	0	0	0.89	20	8
3	Kenya	5	3	2	0	0	0.35	14	10
4	Sri Lanka	5	2	3	0	0	−0.84	11.5	7.5
5	New Zealand	5	1	4	0	0	−0.90	8	4
6	Zimbabwe	5	0	5	0	0	−1.25	3.5	3.5

Source: Points Table

7 March 2003
Scorecard

Australia; 319/5 (50 overs)	v	Sri Lanka; 223 (47.4 overs)
Ricky Ponting 114 (109); Dilhara Fernando 3/47 (9 overs)		Aravinda de Silva 92 (94); Brett Lee 3/52 (10 overs)

Australia won by 96 runs
Centurion Park, Centurion
Umpires: Billy Bowden (NZ) and David Shepherd (Eng)
Player of the match: Ricky Ponting (Aus)

- Australia won the toss and elected to bat.
- Points: Australia 4, Sri Lanka 0

7 March 2003 (D/N)
Scorecard

Kenya; 225/6 (50 overs)	v	India; 226/4 (47.5 overs)
Kennedy Otieno 79 (134); Harbhajan Singh 2/41 (10 overs)		Sourav Ganguly 107* (120); Thomas Odoyo 2/27 (7 overs)

India won by 6 wickets
Newlands Cricket Ground, Cape Town
Umpires: Daryl Harper (Aus) and Peter Willey (Eng)
Player of the match: Sourav Ganguly (Ind)

- Kenya won the toss and elected to bat.
- Points: India 4, Kenya 0

8 March 2003
Scorecard

Zimbabwe; 252/7 (50 overs)	v	New Zealand; 253/4 (47.2 overs)
Heath Streak 72* (84); Chris Cairns 2/16 (4 overs)		Nathan Astle 102* (122); Andy Blignaut 2/41 (10 overs)

New Zealand won by 6 wickets
Goodyear Park, Bloemfontein
Umpires: Darrell Hair (Aus) and Rudi Koertzen (SA)
Player of the match: Nathan Astle (NZ)

- Zimbabwe won the toss and elected to bat.
- Points: New Zealand 4, Zimbabwe 0

10 March 2003
Scorecard

India; 292/6 (50 overs)	v	Sri Lanka; 109 (23 overs)
Sachin Tendulkar 97 (120); Muttiah Muralitharan 3/46 (10 overs)		Kumar Sangakkara 30 (33); Javagal Srinath 4/35 (9 overs)

India won by 183 runs
Wanderers Stadium, Johannesburg
Umpires: David Shepherd (Eng) and Simon Taufel (Aus)
Player of the match: Javagal Srinath (Ind)

- Sri Lanka won the toss and elected to field.
- Points: India 4, Sri Lanka 0

11 March 2003
Scorecard

Australia; 208/9 (50 overs)	v	New Zealand; 112 (30.1 overs)
Andy Bichel 64 (83); Shane Bond 6/23 (10 overs)		Stephen Fleming 48 (70); Brett Lee 5/42 (9.1 overs)

Australia won by 96 runs
St George's Park Cricket Ground, Port Elizabeth
Umpires: Asoka de Silva (SL) and Steve Bucknor (WI)
Player of the match: Shane Bond (NZ)

- New Zealand won the toss and elected to field.
- Points: Australia 4, New Zealand 0

12 March 2003
Scorecard

Zimbabwe; 133 (44.1 overs)	v	Kenya; 135/3 (26 overs)
Andy Flower 63 (101); Martin Suji 3/19 (8 overs)		Thomas Odoyo 43* (60); Andy Blignaut 1/36 (9 overs)

Kenya won by 7 wickets
Goodyear Park, Bloemfontein
Umpires: S Venkataraghavan (Ind) and Aleem Dar (Pak)
Player of the match: Martin Suji (Ken)

- Zimbabwe won the toss and elected to bat.
- Points: Kenya 4, Zimbabwe 0
- Henry Olonga played his last ODI game.

14 March 2003
Scorecard

New Zealand; 146 (45.1 overs)	v	India; 150/3 (40.4 overs)
Stephen Fleming 30 (59); Zaheer Khan 4/42 (8 overs)		Mohammad Kaif 68* (129); Shane Bond 2/23 (8 overs)

India won by 7 wickets
Centurion Park, Centurion
Umpires: Daryl Harper (Aus) and Peter Willey (Eng)
Player of the match: Zaheer Khan (Ind)

- India won the toss and elected to field.
- Points: India 4, New Zealand 0

15 March 2003
Scorecard

Sri Lanka; 256/5 (50 overs)	v	Zimbabwe; 182 (41.5 overs)
Marvan Atapattu 103 (127); Heath Streak 2/40 (10 overs)		Craig Wishart 43 (71); Sanath Jayasuriya 3/30 (6 overs)

Sri Lanka won by 74 runs
Goodyear Park, Bloemfontein
Umpires: Brian Jerling (SA) and Rudi Koertzen (SA)
Player of the match: Marvan Atapattu (SL)

- Sri Lanka won the toss and elected to bat.
- Points: Sri Lanka 4, Zimbabwe 0
- Andy Flower played his last ODI game.

15 March 2003
Scorecard

Kenya; 174/8 (50 overs)	v	Australia; 178/5 (31.2 overs)
Steve Tikolo 51 (100); Brett Lee 3/14 (8 overs)		Adam Gilchrist 67 (43); Aasif Karim 3/7 (8.2 overs)

Australia won by 5 wickets
Kingsmead Cricket Ground, Durban
Umpires: Billy Bowden (NZ) and Steve Bucknor (WI)
Player of the match: Aasif Karim (Ken)

- Australia won the toss and elected to field.
- Points: Australia 4, Kenya 0

== Knockout stage ==
=== Bracket ===
Semi-finals
1	Australia	212/7 (50 overs)
4	Sri Lanka	123/7 (38.1 overs)
2	India	270/4 (50 overs)
3	Kenya	179 (46.2 overs)

Final
1	Australia	359/2 (50 overs)
2	India	234 (39.1 overs)

=== Semi-finals ===
==== Semi-final 1 ====
18 March 2003
Scorecard

Australia; 212/7 (50 overs)	v	Sri Lanka; 123/7 (38.1 overs)
Andrew Symonds 91* (118); Chaminda Vaas 3/34 (10 overs)		Kumar Sangakkara 39* (70); Brett Lee 3/35 (8 overs)

Australia won by 48 runs (D/L method)
St George's Park Cricket Ground, Port Elizabeth
Umpires: Rudi Koertzen (SA) and David Shepherd (Eng)
Player of the match: Andrew Symonds (Aus)

- Australia won the toss and elected to bat.
- Rain interrupted the innings of Sri Lanka at 38.1 overs.
- Sri Lanka were 48 runs behind the DLS par score of 172 from 38.1 overs.
- Australia qualified for the final for fifth time after 1975, 1987, 1996 and 1999.
- Aravinda de Silva played his last ODI game.

On a difficult, slow pitch at Port Elizabeth, Australia struggled their way to 212/7 against tight Sri Lankan bowling, thanks mainly to a great innings from Andrew Symonds (91* from 118 balls, 7 fours, 1 six), demonstrating again captain Ricky Ponting's faith in him. Chaminda Vaas, continuing his excellent tournament, took three wickets. Australia's pace attack then ripped through the Sri Lankan top order, with Brett Lee (3/35 in 8 overs) taking three early wickets and Glenn McGrath (1/20 in 7 overs) taking one. By the time rain arrived in the 39th over, continued tight bowling had squeezed Sri Lanka to 123/7, well behind the target given by the Duckworth–Lewis method. This is the match in which Adam Gilchrist famously "walked" despite being given not out.

==== Semi-final 2 ====
20 March 2003 (D/N)
Scorecard

India; 270/4 (50 overs)	v	Kenya; 179 (46.2 overs)
Sourav Ganguly 111* (114); Thomas Odoyo 2/27 (7 overs)		Steve Tikolo 56 (83); Zaheer Khan 3/14 (9.2 overs)

India won by 91 runs
Kingsmead Cricket Ground, Durban
Umpires: Steve Bucknor (WI) and Daryl Harper (Aus)
Player of the match: Sourav Ganguly (Ind)

- India won the toss and elected to bat.
- India qualified for the final for second time after 1983.
- Aasif Karim played his final international game.
- Kenya became the first Associate ICC member to reach the semi-finals of a Cricket World Cup.

The fairytale ended for the Kenyan team, the only non-Test-playing nation to ever make a World Cup semi-final. Sachin Tendulkar (83 from 101 balls, 5 fours, 1 six) and Sourav Ganguly (111 from 114 balls, 5 fours, 5 sixes), batted the Kenyans out of the game as India reached a total of 270/4. Under the Durban lights, the potent Indian seam attack of Zaheer Khan (3/14 in 9.2 overs), the experienced Javagal Srinath (1/11 in 7 overs) and Ashish Nehra (2/11 in 5 overs) ripped through the Kenyan top order. Kenya were bowled out for 179, with only Steve Tikolo (56 from 83 balls, 5 fours, 2 sixes) putting up any significant resistance.

=== Final ===
23 March 2003
Scorecard

Australia; 359/2 (50 overs)	v	India; 234 (39.2 overs)
Ricky Ponting 140* (121); Harbhajan Singh 2/49 (8 overs)		Virender Sehwag 82 (81); Glenn McGrath 3/52 (8.2 overs)

Australia won by 125 runs
Wanderers Stadium, Johannesburg
Umpires: Steve Bucknor (WI) and David Shepherd (Eng)
Player of the match: Ricky Ponting (Aus)

- India won the toss and elected to field.
- Javagal Srinath played his last international match.

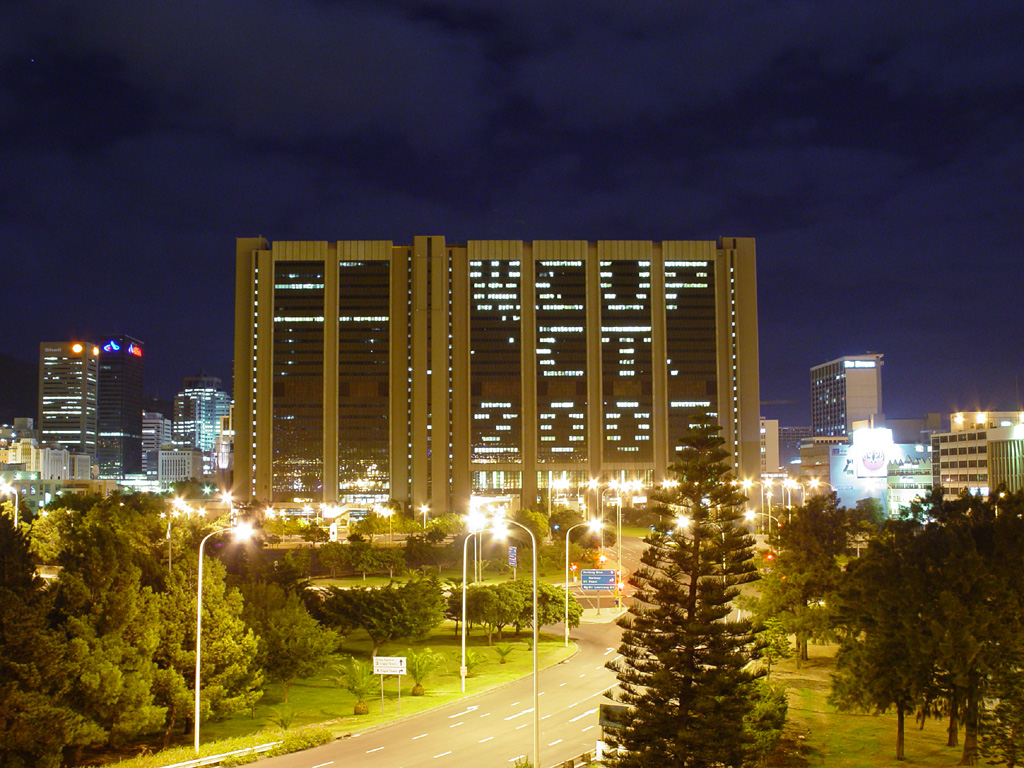
A civic centre lit up to mark the World Cup

India won the toss, and Ganguly, elected to field, hoping to take advantage of a pitch left damp by dew and rain. On a lively Wanderers Stadium pitch, the Australian openers took advantage of very wayward Indian opening bowlers to get off to a flying start. Adam Gilchrist (57 from 48 balls, 8 fours, 1 six) and Matthew Hayden (37 from 54 balls, 5 fours) shared an opening partnership of 105 runs in 14 overs, forcing Ganguly to bring on the spinners unusually early. The change of pace brought wickets with Adam Gilchrist, who had been swinging at everything, holing out off a sweep shot from the bowling of Harbhajan Singh. Matthew Hayden, looking somewhat better than he had throughout the tournament, soon followed for 37, leaving Australia at 2/125 Captain Ricky Ponting (140 from 121 balls, 4 fours, 8 sixes) and Damien Martyn (88 from 84 balls, 7 fours, 1 six), playing with a broken thumb, completing a partnership of 234 runs in 30.1 overs, an Australian record for one-day cricket. Ponting and Martyn started efficiently, putting away bad balls but mostly keeping the scoring going with good running, then letting loose in the last ten overs, taking 109 from them. Ponting in particular dispatched the bowling over the fence with fearsome regularity in scoring 8 sixes, the most from one batsman in any World Cup match at the time. The final Australian total of 359 (2 wickets, 50 overs), at a run rate of 7.18 runs an over, was their then highest ever in ODI history.

India's run chase was made even more difficult after their best batsman, Sachin Tendulkar, was out in the first over after skying a pull shot, Glenn McGrath completing the caught and bowled. Nevertheless, Virender Sehwag's (82 from 81 balls, 10 fours, 3 sixes) run-a-ball half century gave India respectability as they maintained a high scoring rate. Their only realistic hope—a washout—looked a possibility as the game was interrupted by rain with India at 3/103 after 17 overs. However, this rain passed by, and India's hopes were dashed when Sehwag was run out by Darren Lehmann, and again when Rahul Dravid (47 from 57 balls, 2 fours) was bowled by Andy Bichel, ending their partnership of 88 runs in 13.2 overs. India's batsmen continued to throw wickets away in the chase as the run rate crept up past 7 an over, and they were finally bowled out for 234 (all out, 39.2 overs) at a run rate of 5.97 runs an over giving Australia an emphatic victory by a record margin (in World Cup finals thus far) of 125 runs, underlining their dominance of the tournament. Ponting was named "Man of the Match", and Sachin Tendulkar was named "Player of the Series."

== Statistics ==
=== Leading run scorers ===
Player	Team	Runs
Sachin Tendulkar	India	673
Sourav Ganguly	India	465
Ricky Ponting	Australia	415
Adam Gilchrist	Australia	408
Herschelle Gibbs	South Africa	384

=== Leading wicket takers ===
Player	Team	Wickets
Chaminda Vaas	Sri Lanka	23
Brett Lee	Australia	22
Glenn McGrath	Australia	21
Zaheer Khan	India	18
Shane Bond	New Zealand	17
Muttiah Muralitharan	Sri Lanka	17

== Controversies ==
=== Security issues in Zimbabwe and Kenya ===
The security and political situation in Zimbabwe, and the appropriateness of playing there given the misdeeds of the regime of Robert Mugabe was a point of concern before the tournament. Two Zimbabwean players, Andy Flower and Henry Olonga wore black armbands in their opening game protesting against the undemocratic rule in Zimbabwe. Both men subsequently retired from Zimbabwean cricket, and began playing overseas. England faced a great deal of domestic pressure to boycott their match in Zimbabwe on political grounds and did not play, citing fears for the players' safety. The boycott proved costly, as Zimbabwe advanced to the Super Sixes, just 2 points ahead of England, their total including the 4 points achieved from the walkover. Similarly, New Zealand decided against playing in Kenya because of security fears which would ultimately cost them a semi-final spot.

=== Shane Warne's drug test ===
Australian star player Shane Warne was sent home from the cup the day before his team's opening game, after a positive drug test in a lead-up competition in Australia revealed that he had taken a banned diuretic. The leg spinner claimed that he had taken a 'fluid pill' on the advice of his mother.
