= Zaheer Khan =

Indian cricketer

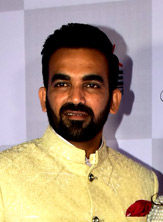
- Zaheer in 2018

Personal information
- Born: 8 October 1978 (age 48); Shrirampur, Maharashtra, India
- Nickname: Zak, Zippy, Zakky
- Height: 6 ft (183 cm)
- Batting: Right-handed
- Bowling: Left-arm fast-medium
- Role: Bowler
- Relatives: Sagarika Ghatge (m. 2017)

International information
- National side: India (2000–2014)
- Test debut (cap 231): 10 November 2000 v Bangladesh
- Last Test: 14 February 2014 v New Zealand
- ODI debut (cap 133): 3 October 2000 v Kenya
- Last ODI: 4 August 2012 v Sri Lanka
- ODI shirt no.: 34
- T20I debut (cap 5): 1 December 2006 v South Africa
- Last T20I: 2 October 2012 v South Africa

Domestic team information
- Years: Team
- 1999–2006: Baroda
- 2004: Surrey
- 2006: Worcestershire
- 2006–2014: Mumbai
- 2008, 2011–2013: Royal Challengers Bangalore
- 2009–2010, 2014: Mumbai Indians
- 2015–2017: Delhi Daredevils

Career statistics
Competition	Test	ODI	FC	T20I
Matches	92	200	169	17
Runs scored	1231	792	2,489	13
Batting average	11.94	12.00	13.60	6.05
100s/50s	0/3	0/0	0/5	0/0
Top score	75	34*	75	9
Balls bowled	18,785	10,097	34,279	352
Wickets	311	282	672	17
Bowling average	32.95	29.44	27.97	26.35
5 wickets in innings	11	1	35	0
10 wickets in match	1	0	8	0
Best bowling	7/87	5/42	9/138	4/19
Catches/stumpings	19/–	43/–	46/–	2/–
Medal record
Men's Cricket
Representing India
ICC Cricket World Cup
Winner	2011 India-Bangladesh-Sri Lanka
Runner-up	2003 South Africa-Zimbabwe-Kenya
ICC Champions Trophy
Winner	2002 Sri Lanka
Runner-up	2000 Kenya
ACC Asia Cup
Winner	2010 Sri Lanka
Runner-up	2004 Sri Lanka
- Source: ESPNcricinfo, 25 December 2016

Zaheer Khan (born 8 October 1978) is an Indian former professional cricketer who played all formats of the game for the Indian national team from 2000 till 2014. A left-arm fast-medium bowler known for his ability to "move the ball both ways off the wicket and swing the old ball at some pace", he was known for reverse swing with the old ball. He is the second-most successful Indian pace bowler (tied with Ishant Sharma) in Test cricket, behind Kapil Dev.

He also has the distinct record of dismissing Graeme Smith, Kumar Sangakkara, Sanath Jayasuriya and Matthew Hayden – some of the game's most feared left-handed batsmen – over 10 times each in international cricket, and also holds the record for dismissing the third-most number of left-handed batsmen (237), after Muttiah Muralitharan (325), and Shaun Pollock (252).

Khan started his domestic career by playing for Baroda. In Tests, he was averaged around 36 at home and 31 away from home. With India, he was a member of the team that was one of the joint-winners of the 2002 ICC Champions Trophy, and one of the key members of the 2011 World Cup winning team, leading the pace attack with 21 wickets in just 9 games. In 2011 he was conferred with the Arjuna Award, India's second highest sporting honour, by the President of India.

During the course of his career, Khan sustained recurring injuries, which often interrupted his progress at the international level, and this was the reason he set up ProSport Fitness & Services, a special rehabilitation & training center in association with Adrian Le Roux and Andrew Leipus.

Khan was selected as one of the Wisden Cricketers of the Year in the year 2008. He announced his retirement from international cricket in October 2015. He played for Worcestershire in County Cricket and played for Royal Challengers Bangalore, Delhi Daredevils and Mumbai Indians in the Indian Premier League. In 2020, the Government of India honoured him with the Padma Shri. He was the former mentor of the IPL team Lucknow Super Giants for the 2025 edition.

== Early and personal life ==
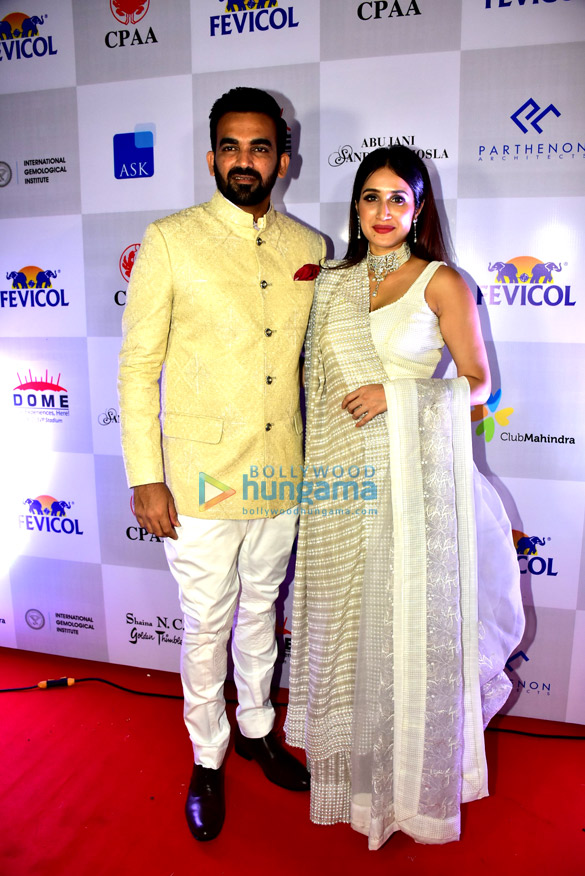
Zaheer Khan with his wife Sagarika Ghatge

Khan was born on 8 October 1978 in Shrirampur, Ahmednagar district, Maharashtra, in a Marathi Muslim family to Zakia and Bakhtiyar Khan. He has an elder brother, Zeeshan and a younger brother, Anees. He started his coaching under Utsav Yadav, and attended the New Marathi Primary School and the K.J. Somaiyya Secondary School in Shrirampur. He also played in the local Revenue Colony Cricket Club (RCC) in Shrirampur after which he started his career in Pune.

On 24 April 2017, he announced on his Twitter account that he was engaged to actress Sagarika Ghatge. The couple got married on 23 November 2017. The couple have a son, who was born in 2025.

== Domestic career ==
Khan came to Mumbai in 1996 and joined the National Cricket Club that played in Division A in the city. He played in competitions such as the Kanga Cricket League, Comrade Shield and the Purshottam Shield with the team. Sandeep Mahadkar, Khan's captain during the time, recalled the latter's ability with the ball with an instance where he reverse swung a ball that had been bowled 50 overs with, bowling ten maiden overs and helping his team win a Comrade Shield game. His ability with the bat was recalled by another former teammate with who Khan put together a 102-run stand for ninth wicket making an unbeaten 62 runs taking his team home. His "jaw-dropping spells in the Purshottam Shield" culminated with the 7/74 performance against Shivaji Park Gymkhana in January 1997. he was later sent to the MRF Pace Foundation in Chennai by Sudhir Naik, owner of the National Cricket Club. Impressed by his talent, the bowling coach there, T. A. Sekhar, pushed Khan to play for Baroda.

Khan quickly made his name playing for Baroda in the first-class level. In the final of the 2000–01 season of the Ranji Trophy against Railways, Khan received the man of the match award after he returned figures of 8/145 for the match, including a five-wicket haul in the second innings (5/16), helping his team lift the trophy for the fifth time and a first in 43 years.

Khan transferred to Mumbai at the start of the 2006–07 Indian cricket season his debut for Mumbai until the final of the Ranji Trophy in which he took 9 wickets as Mumbai defeated Bengal.

In 2005 Khan, signed for Worcestershire County Cricket Club in England as one of their two overseas players, replacing Shoaib Akhtar. Although Worcestershire went on to lose the match, Zaheer took ten wickets against Somerset on debut; in doing so he became the first Worcestershire player to take 10 wickets on debut for over 100 years. In June he took the first nine wickets to fall in the first innings against Essex, ending with 9–138; had wicket-keeper Steven Davies not dropped a catch offered by last man Darren Gough he would have become the first bowler ever to take all ten for the county.

Khan has played the Royal Challengers as well as Mumbai Indians before he was picked for the Delhi Daredevils in the 2015 auction. He has captained the Daredevils in 2016 and 2017. In 2017 season, Zaheer became the 10th bowler in the history and 8th Indian bowler, to pick 100 wickets in Indian Premier League. At the age of 38, he is the oldest player to achieve this feat.

== International career ==
Zaheer was selected in 2000 for the first intake of the National Cricket Academy in Bangalore. He made his Test debut against Bangladesh and ODI debut against Kenya during the 2000 ICC KnockOut Trophy in the same year.

=== Struggling form ===
In late 2005 pacemen Sreesanth and R. P. Singh made their international debuts and became regular members of the Indian team making it difficult for Zaheer to retain his position in the playing eleven. The Board of Control for Cricket in India demoted Zaheer from a B-grade to a C-grade contract at the end of the year. He returned for the 2005 tour of Pakistan, where India fielded three left arm pacemen and had difficulty dismissing Pakistan with a lack of variety in the bowling attack.

=== Recall to team ===
Late in 2006, Zaheer was recalled to the Test and ODI team for the tour of South Africa, following Irfan Pathan's slump in form and an injury to Munaf Patel. After consistent performances on tour, his performance in early 2007 in home ODIs against the West Indies and Sri Lanka, including a career best 5/42, saw him named in the squad for the 2007 World Cup.

He won the Man of the Match award in the first Test between India and Australia in the 2008–2009 series in India for his all round performance with the bat and the ball.

=== ODI career ===
He has taken 282 ODI wickets at an average of just over 29 runs per wicket taking 4 wickets in a match 6 times (4 times against Zimbabwe) including 32 wickets against Zimbabwe at an average of 17.46 runs per dismissal. He, along with other seamers like Javagal Srinath and Ashish Nehra helped India to make it to the finals of the 2003 World Cup. Zaheer finished the tournament as fourth highest wicket-taker – 18 wickets from 11 matches at an average of 20 runs per wicket. He is also the fourth highest wicket-taker in ODIs for India with 282 scalps behind Anil Kumble (337), Javagal Srinath (315) and Ajit Agarkar (288).

=== Test career ===
Zaheer has taken 311 Test wickets at an average of just over 32 runs per wicket. South African star all-rounder Jacques Kallis was Zaheer's 300th test wicket. In 16 matches from the beginning of the tour of West Indies in April 2002 to the end of the 1st match against Australia in December 2003, Brisbane, Zaheer took 54 wickets from 16 matches at an average of 30 runs. It all turned downhill after the first Test against Australia in Brisbane in December 2003. Having taken 5 of the top 7 Australian batsmen in the first innings (5 for 95), he injured himself in the second during the opening spell. After missing the second Test he returned for the third, but was injured midway through the match and was forced to return home. The injury kept him from the early 2004 tour of Pakistan, India's first Test series victory in the country.

Earlier, Zaheer held the world record for the highest Test score by a number 11 when he scored 75 against Bangladesh in 2004. At the time he was batting with Sachin Tendulkar; the pair amassed 133 runs, a new record for India's tenth-wicket. This record was broken by Tino Best of the West Indies in 2012. The current record holder is Ashton Agar of the Australia on his debut match in 2013.

=== Knuckle Ball ===
In international cricket, Zaheer Khan was the first bowler to bowl knuckle ball. Zaheer Khan introduced the knuckle ball way back in 2011 world cup. He used that ball for great effect. He used that ball to get crucial wickets at crucial times like the wickets of Ian Bell and Paul Collingwood against England and the wicket of Devon Smith against the West Indies and the wicket of Michael Hussey in the Quarter Final against Australia.

In an interview he said : "The whole 2011 World Cup, I was looking forward to it, especially playing in front of the home crowd – even if it added that extra bit of pressure. I was preparing a new delivery that I wanted to use, which was the knuckle ball. I was working on it for a year leading up to the tournament. Even though I had perfected it, I was purposely not using it in any of the matches [before the tournament]. It got me a lot of success. When a plan like that works, it gives you extra satisfaction."

=== World Cup ===
Zaheer has 44 World Cup wickets, spanning from 2003 to 2011, putting him in ninth place behind Glenn McGrath (71), Muttiah Muralitharan (68), Mitchell Starc(65), Lasith Malinga (56), Wasim Akram (55), Trent Boult(53) and Chaminda Vaas (49) on the list of highest number of wickets by a bowler in the marquee event. He is tied with Srinath in ninth but Srinath has played 34 games as opposed to Zaheer's 23.

Zaheer, who was one of India's trump cards during their World Cup triumph in 2011, finished as the joint highest wicket-taker along with Shahid Afridi with 21 scalps.

=== Later career ===
July 2011 India embarked on a tour of England. Having bowled 13.3 overs, Zaheer strained his hamstring and suffered an ankle injury in the first Test of the four-match series and as a result was ruled out of the rest of the tour. Zaheer came back in December and played a test match against Australia on Boxing day. He took two wickets in two consecutive deliveries, dismissing Michael Clarke for 31 and Mike Hussey for a duck. In the second test at Sydney, he took three wickets of the four to fall, Clarke scoring 329*; his were the best figures in both these innings. As of February 2014 Zaheer Khan is ranked 22 in the ICC Player Rankings for Test bowlers. He toured South Africa in December 2013 and New Zealand in 2014.

=== Retirement ===
Zaheer Khan announced his retirement from international and first-class cricket on 15 October 2015 in a tweet saying "I bid adieu to my career in international cricket. I look forward to signing off with IPL 9."

== Coaching career ==
Zaheer was announced as bowling coach for the India national cricket team in 2017, but was instead appointed to a bowling consultant role by the new Indian head coach Ravi Shastri. He became Director of Cricket for Mumbai Indians in 2018 and was promoted to Global Head of Cricket Development in 2022. He was team mentor for Lucknow Super Giants from August 2024 to September 2025, with responsibilities including direction of team scouting and strategy. He was appointed as the head coach of Chennai Super Kings in September 2026 ahead of the IPL 2027 season, succeeding Stephen Fleming.

== ProSport Fitness & Services ==
ProSport Fitness and Services
- Type: Physical fitness and sports
- Industry: Physical fitness
- Founded: Mumbai, India
- Founder: Zaheer Khan
- Headquarters: Mumbai, India
- Key people: Zaheer Khan, Andrew Leipus, Adrian Le Roux
- Divisions: Functional training, strength and conditioning, physiotherapy
- Website: http://prosportfitness.in/

In 2014 Khan founded a fitness and sports company ProSport Fitness and Services in Mumbai, that offers fitness training and physiotherapy services. Involving personnel such as Andrew Leipus and Adrian Le Roux, the center aims to "maximize potential" of people and athletes by personally assisted fitness programs. Khan stated that the objective was to "bring in world class fitness program to India for sports injury management". It offers scientifically designed programs and treatment while conducting workshops and sessions for corporates and schools to spread awareness of physical fitness.
