= Jacob-Jan Esmeijer =

Dutch cricketer (born 1972)

Personal information
- Full name: Jacob-Jan Esmeijer
- Born: May 27, 1972 (age 54)
- Batting: Right-handed
- Bowling: Slow left-arm orthodox

International information
- National side: Netherlands (2002-2003)
- ODI debut (cap 15): 16 September 2002 v Sri Lanka
- Last ODI: 3 March 2003 v Namibia

Career statistics
Competition	ODI	FC	LA
Matches	6	2	21
Runs scored	10	37	164
Batting average	2.50	12.33	12.61
100s/50s	0/0	0/0	0/0
Top score	7	23	39
Balls bowled	228	162	822
Wickets	0	1	14
Bowling average	-	107.00	48.78
5 wickets in innings	0	0	0
10 wickets in match	0	0	0
Best bowling	0/16	1/51	3/36
Catches/stumpings	3/0	1/0	7/0
- Source: Cricinfo, 16 May 2017

Jacob-Jan Esmeijer also simply known as JJ Esmeijer (born May 28, 1972, in Rotterdam, South Holland) is a Dutch former cricketer. He is a right-handed batsman and a slow left-arm bowler. Esmeijer has played for Somerset's second XI.

== International career ==
He was the Netherlands' top spin-bowler at the 2003 Cricket World Cup. Although he bowled with good control and an excellent (for an Associate-level spinner) economy rate of 5 runs per over, he was unlucky not to capture a wicket in any of the 4 matches he played in that tournament.

== Sources ==
- Jacob-Jan Esmeijer at Cricinfo
