= Daan van Bunge =

Dutch cricketer

Personal information
- Full name: Daan Lodewijk Samuel van Bunge
- Born: 19 October 1982 (age 44); Voorburg, Netherlands
- Batting: Right-handed
- Bowling: Right arm leg break

International information
- National side: Netherlands (2002–2013)
- ODI debut (cap 19): 16 September 2002 v Sri Lanka
- Last ODI: 29 August 2013 v Canada
- ODI shirt no.: 19
- T20I debut (cap 11): 2 August 2008 v Kenya
- Last T20I: 28 November 2013 v Scotland
- T20I shirt no.: 23

Career statistics
Competition	ODI	T20I	FC	LA
Matches	37	14	12	77
Runs scored	633	90	442	1,597
Batting average	21.10	11.25	23.26	26.18
100s/50s	0/3	0/0	0/3	1/8
Top score	80	24	98*	137
Balls bowled	331	14	975	582
Wickets	11	1	23	17
Bowling average	29.90	15.00	27.30	34.94
5 wickets in innings	0	0	0	0
10 wickets in match	0	0	0	0
Best bowling	3/16	1/14	4/163	3/16
Catches/stumpings	11/–	4/–	15/–	26/–
- Source: Cricinfo, 19 May 2017

Daan Lodewijk Samuel van Bunge (born 19 October 1982) is a Dutch former cricketer. He is a right-handed batsman and a right-arm leg break bowler.

He is the currently Director of Cricket at Haileybury in the UK. He also works as a PE teacher at a school in The Hague, Netherlands.

== International career ==
Van Bunge has represented the Netherlands at many age levels, including at the Under-15 World Cup in 1996, and on their Under-17 tour of England in 1997. He made his One Day International debut for the Netherlands in the 2002 ICC Champions Trophy against Sri Lanka.

Van Bunge was named in the Netherlands squad for the 2003 Cricket World Cup in South Africa, and it was his performances in this tournament that brought him to the attention of a wider audience. In his first World Cup match, he scored 62 out of a team total of 136 against India, and in his second, he captured 3 of the 4 England wickets to fall, his victims being Nick Knight, Michael Vaughan and Andrew Flintoff. He again finished as his team's innings top-scorer in the matches against Pakistan and Zimbabwe, as well as collecting bowling figures of 2–27 against Pakistan. These returns highlighted Van Bunge's erratic bowling style.

In 2003, Van Bunge was selected to join the MCC Young Cricketers programme. He added his name to the record books in 2004 when he scored a 38-ball century – the fastest in the history of MCC Young Cricketers. In his three-year spell, he scored a record 3,400 runs, and played for Middlesex one season. At the end of the 2005 season, he returned to the Netherlands to play for Excelsior'20 where he was the professional for 9 years and captained the side to two championships, a club based in Schiedam.

Van Bunge continued to regularly represent the Netherlands in international competition. The 2005 ICC Trophy saw the Netherlands in a four-way battle for the fifth and final 2007 World Cup qualifying spot, with the first sudden-death match against Denmark. Batting at number 3, Van Bunge bludgeoned 137 from only 118 balls, sharing a 242 run second-wicket stand with Bas Zuiderent to bat Denmark out of the match. He then helped himself to 2–24 in the Danish reply. Van Bunge duly represented the Dutch in the 2007 Cricket World Cup. In their opening group stage game against South Africa on 16 March 2007, Van Bunge was the unfortunate victim as Herschelle Gibbs set a new ODI record by scoring 36 runs (six sixes from six balls) from Van Bunge's fourth over., though a run-a-ball 33 against eventual champions Australia was a highlight.

Van Bunge retired from international cricket after the 2007 Cricket World Cup, citing a lack of motivation and a conflicting study schedule, however made himself available for the national squad again in 2008 following completion of his studies.

== Late career ==
His return to the Dutch team was marked by several notable performances, including a marathon 98* to save an Inter Continental Cup match against Canada, van Bunge clearly not allowing the ambition of a premier first class century to override the needs of the team.

At the start of the 2010 season, when the KNCB announced central contracts for the first time, he was on the list to receive an A-type contract, but declined. Much rumour surrounds the negotiations which took place at this time, but it seems that he was unable to make the assurances to the national selectors regarding availability, again citing career and study demands, but also appearing to give preference to his club, Excelsior.

He was not picked for the national side during 2010, but in a strongly worded interview with a national newspaper suggested that he remained available and in fact still held an ambition to play in the 2011 World Cup. However, when the Dutch preparatory squad was announced in September 2010, his name was notably absent.

A definite course of direction was needed after this incident and in 2010 he started his PE bachelor, he finished the four-year study in 2014 and also received the academic medal for being the student of his year. In the last two years of his study he combined playing for the national team. The World Cricket League games in Namibia proved that he still had the level to play at international level as he steered the Netherlands home with a 65 to win by 1 wicket. The Netherlands also played the English Lions in a 3-match series, which surprisingly the Dutch won 2–1. Van Bunge had his part to play with some solid scores.

The World Cup 2015 qualification tournament in New Zealand was less successful, due to an elbow injury that saw him lose 25% of his strength is his left arm. His wish to say farewell after a long 12-year spell for the Netherlands (+/- 140 caps) at a World Cup was not granted.
