= Reinout Scholte =

Dutch cricketer (born 1967)

Personal information
- Full name: Reinout Hans Scholte
- Born: 10 August 1967 (age 59); The Hague, Netherlands
- Batting: Right-handed
- Role: Wicket-keeper

International information
- National side: Netherlands (2002–2003)
- ODI debut (cap 18): 16 September 2002 v Sri Lanka
- Last ODI: 28 February 2003 v Zimbabwe
- ODI shirt no.: 8

Career statistics
Competition	ODI	List A
Matches	5	16
Runs scored	39	95
Batting average	7.80	7.91
100s/50s	0/0	0/0
Top score	12	16
Catches/stumpings	0/–	11/3
- Source: ESPNcricinfo, 13 May 2017

Reinout Scholte (born 10 August 1967) is a Dutch former international cricketer. He played as a right-handed batsman and a right-arm medium-fast bowler, but usually occupied the position of wicket-keeper instead of bowling. He played for HBS and VOC in Dutch domestic cricket.

Scholte served as the vice-captain, and intermittently took on the role of captain, of the 2002 ICC Champions Trophy squad. His wicket-keeping was the main asset to Holland as they qualified for the 2001 ICC Trophy.

Scholte has two children; his son also plays cricket for HBS.

== Sources ==
- Reinout Scholte at ESPNcricinfo
