= Klaas-Jan van Noortwijk =

Dutch cricketer (born 1970)

Personal information
- Full name: Klaas-Jan Jeroen van Noortwijk
- Born: 10 July 1970 (age 56); Rotterdam, Netherlands
- Batting: Right-handed
- Bowling: Right-arm medium

International information
- National side: Netherlands (1996–2003)
- ODI debut (cap 10): 17 February 1996 v New Zealand
- Last ODI: 3 March 2003 v Namibia
- ODI shirt no.: 99

Career statistics
Competition	ODI	List A
Matches	9	25
Runs scored	322	585
Batting average	46.00	26.59
100s/50s	1/1	1/2
Top score	134*	134*
Balls bowled	–	9
Wickets	–	0
Bowling average	–	–
5 wickets in innings	–	–
10 wickets in match	–	–
Best bowling	–	–
Catches/stumpings	0/0	9/0
- Source: Cricinfo, 15 May 2017

Klaas-Jan Jeroen van Noortwijk (born 10 July 1970) is a Dutch former cricketer. Having played as a right-handed batsman and a right-arm medium-pace bowler, he now teaches at a Dutch high school.

== Domestic career ==
He started playing cricket at VOC in Rotterdam when he was 8 years old. A back injury prevented him from pursuing a bowling career, but gave him the opportunity to concentrate on his batting. He made his debut at the age of 23 and played for the Netherlands for 9 years. He was a strong performer in important matches.

== International career ==
van Noortwijk held the record for the highest individual score for the Netherlands in a One Day International (ODI), having scored an unbeaten 134 against Namibia at the 2003 World Cup. His record was beaten by Wesley Barresi in 2014. The last of his nine ODIs appearances was against Namibia in March 2003.

== After cricket ==
He worked as a mathematics teacher in Het Kennemer Lyceum.
