= Feiko Kloppenburg =

Dutch cricketer (born 1974)

Personal information
- Born: May 19, 1974 (age 52); Haarlem, Netherlands
- Batting: Right-handed
- Bowling: Right-arm medium

International information
- National side: Netherlands (2002–2003)
- ODI debut (cap 21): 21 September 2002 v Pakistan
- Last ODI: 3 March 2003 v Namibia
- ODI shirt no.: 94

Career statistics
Competition	ODI	FC	LA
Matches	6	1	24
Runs scored	161	0	508
Batting average	27.50	0.00	26.73
100s/50s	1/0	0/0	1/3
Top score	121	0	121
Balls bowled	242	72	971
Wickets	8	0	33
Bowling average	23.87	–	20.84
5 wickets in innings	0	0	0
10 wickets in match	0	0	0
Best bowling	4/42	–	4/25
Catches/stumpings	1/–	0/–	5/–
- Source: Cricinfo, 13 May 2017

Jan Feiko Kloppenburg (born 19 June 1974) is a Dutch former international cricketer. Born in Haarlem, North Holland, Kloppenburg played six One Day Internationals for the Netherlands from September 2002 to March 2003.

== Domestic career ==
Kloppenburg made his first-class cricket debut in the 2004 ICC Intercontinental Cup game against Ireland at Deventer. He had a match to forget, bagging a pair with the bat and conceding 60 runs from 12 wicketless overs.

== International career ==
Kloppenburg toured England with a Netherlands A side in 1995, but his first tournament of note for his country was the 1998 European Championships, held that year in his home country. He scored only 40 runs in four innings, and took just two wickets, but was part of the side that defeated Denmark in the final at The Hague. He appeared in six of the Netherlands' ten games in the 2001 ICC Trophy, but scored only one half-century and had been dropped by the time the Dutch team beat Namibia in the final.

He made his One Day International debut in September 2002 at the ICC Champions Trophy. He played only one match in this competition, opening the batting against Pakistan but scoring just 7 before being run out by Shahid Afridi. He also took the only Pakistani wicket to fall, that of Imran Nazir. Five months later, he played a fuller part in the Netherlands' 2003 World Cup squad, with five appearances in the competition.

Against Namibia, he made 121 to become the first Dutch cricketer to score an ODI century, just ahead of teammate Klaas-Jan van Noortwijk who also passed three figures in the match and with whom he put on 228 runs for the second wicket, a Dutch record for any wicket in ODIs. Kloppenburg then completed a fine all-round performance by claiming 4/42 with the ball, making him only the sixth player to score a hundred and take four wickets in the same ODI. He was adjudged Man of the Match for his performance as well.
