= Victor Grandia =

Dutch cricketer (born 1979)

Personal information
- Full name: Victor D Grandia
- Born: 10 January 1979 (age 47); Amsterdam, Netherlands
- Batting: Right-handed
- Bowling: Right-arm medium

International information
- National side: Netherlands (2002)
- Only ODI (cap 16): 16 September 2002 v Sri Lanka

Career statistics
Competition	ODI
Matches	1
Runs scored	0
Batting average	0.00
100s/50s	0/0
Top score	0
Balls bowled	30
Wickets	1
Bowling average	40.00
5 wickets in innings	0
10 wickets in match	0
Best bowling	1/40
Catches/stumpings	0/–
- Source: Cricinfo, 19 May 2017

Victor Grandia (born January 10, 1979, in Amsterdam, North Holland) is a Dutch former cricketer. A right-handed batsman and a right-arm medium-fast bowler, he played just one ODI game, against Sri Lanka, taking the wicket of Sanath Jayasuriya.

Grandia was part of the Dutch cricket team at the 2003 Cricket World Cup, having played in List A cricket from 2002. He had previously toured England in 1996 with the Dutch Colts and played in the International Youth Tournament in 1997 in Bermuda.

== Sources ==
- Victor Grandia at Cricinfo
