= Adeel Raja =

Pakistani-born Dutch cricketer

Personal information
- Full name: Mohammad Adeel Khalid Raja
- Born: 15 August 1980 (age 46); Lahore, Punjab, Pakistan
- Batting: Right-handed
- Bowling: Right arm off spin
- Role: Bowler

International information
- National side: Netherlands (2002–2011)
- ODI debut (cap 14): 16 September 2002 v Sri Lanka
- Last ODI: 18 March 2011 v Ireland
- ODI shirt no.: 4

Domestic team information
- Years: Team
- VRA Cricket

Career statistics
| Competition | ODI | FC | LA |
|---|---|---|---|
| Matches | 21 | 7 | 33 |
| Runs scored | 28 | 62 | 90 |
| Batting average | 2.80 | 6.88 | 6.92 |
| 100s/50s | 0/0 | 0/0 | 0/0 |
| Top score | 8* | 28 | 19 |
| Balls bowled | 846 | 752 | 1,344 |
| Wickets | 17 | 7 | 24 |
| Bowling average | 40.58 | 59.85 | 44.58 |
| 5 wickets in innings | 0 | 0 | 0 |
| 10 wickets in match | 0 | 0 | 0 |
| Best bowling | 4/42 | 2/82 | 4/42 |
| Catches/stumpings | 3/– | 0/– | 5/– |
- Source: ESPNcricinfo, 13 May 2017

Mohammad Adeel Khalid Raja (Urdu: محمد عدیل خالد راجہ; born 15 August 1980), or Adeel Raja, is a Pakistani-born Dutch cricketer.

His One Day International debut for the Netherlands against Sri Lanka was on 16 September 2002. Raja is a right-handed batsman and a right-arm off-break bowler.
