= Roland Lefebvre =

Dutch cricket player

Personal information
- Full name: Roland Philippe Lefebvre
- Born: 7 February 1963 (age 63); Rotterdam, Netherlands
- Batting: Right-handed
- Bowling: Right-arm medium

International information
- National side: Netherlands (1996–2003)
- ODI debut (cap 7): 17 February 1996 v New Zealand
- Last ODI: 28 February 2003 v Zimbabwe
- ODI shirt no.: 1

Domestic team information
- Years: Team
- 1990–1992: Somerset
- 1990/91: Canterbury
- 1993–1995: Glamorgan

Career statistics
Competition	ODI	FC	LA
Matches	11	77	137
Runs scored	171	1,494	955
Batting average	28.50	20.46	17.05
100s/50s	0/0	1/3	0/0
Top score	45	100	45
Balls bowled	534	13,485	6,783
Wickets	9	149	178
Bowling average	38.44	36.23	23.05
5 wickets in innings	0	3	2
10 wickets in match	0	0	0
Best bowling	2/38	6/45	7/15
Catches/stumpings	4/–	36/–	63/–
- Source: Cricinfo, 15 May 2017

Roland Philippe Lefebvre (born 7 February 1963), is a Dutch former international cricketer who captained the Netherlands national cricket team in One Day International matches.

== Domestic career ==
Lefebvre made his first-class debut with Somerset against Oxford University in 1990, then took 5/30 on his first County Championship appearance the following week. Later that year, he claimed 7/15 (at the time the equal fifth-best return in List A cricket) in Somerset's record 346-run victory against Devon in the NatWest Trophy. Lefebvre spent the winter in New Zealand, playing for Canterbury, where he achieved his career-best first-class bowling figures of 6/45, then back in England in 1991 scored his only first-class hundred, making exactly 100 against Worcestershire.

Lefebvre was signed by Glamorgan for 1993 and proved particularly effective in one-day cricket where his consistent accuracy made him difficult for batsmen to dominate, as evidenced by a superb bowling analysis of 11-5-13-2 in the quarter-final of the NatWest Trophy game against Worcestershire. Lefebvre's bowling was a significant factor in Glamorgan's Sunday League triumph in 1993.

Lefebvre was also a popular figure at Glamorgan, Andrew Hignell listing him among the county's cult heroes.

== International career ==
In 1989 Lefebvre was in the Netherlands side that recorded a surprising victory over an England XI including Nasser Hussain, Alec Stewart and Derek Pringle in a limited-over match, and he was also present when they repeated the achievement (with Hussain again and Darren Gough in the England XI) four years later. In between, Lefebvre also helped the Netherlands in their surprise victory against a West Indies team including Richie Richardson, Desmond Haynes, Courtney Walsh and Carl Hooper (who Lefebvre dismissed) in another limited-over match in 1991. These matches did not have one-day international status but, during the following winter, 1993/4, Lefebvre took 11 wickets at 16.45 in the ICC Trophy, helping the Netherlands to achieve third place in the tournament and qualification for the 1996 Cricket World Cup, ensuring the team would play its first full internationals in that tournament.

Although a bad groin injury in 1995 forced Lefebvre to retire from professional cricket, he continued to appear for his country in the ICC Trophy, a competition for which he holds several career records: most appearances (43), most wickets taken (71 at just 11.64) and most catches by an outfielder (26). He also appeared for the Netherlands at full One Day International level in both the 1996 and 2003 World Cups and in the 2002–03 Champions Trophy, captaining the Dutch team from 1999 onwards. Although because of injury he missed his team's first victory in a one-day international, coming in the 2003 World Cup against Namibia, ESPNCricinfo describes Lefebvre as "arguably the best cricketer Holland has produced".

Lefebvre retired from playing after the 2003 World Cup, and now serves as the Dutch national youth coach.
