= List of Sri Lanka One Day International cricket records =

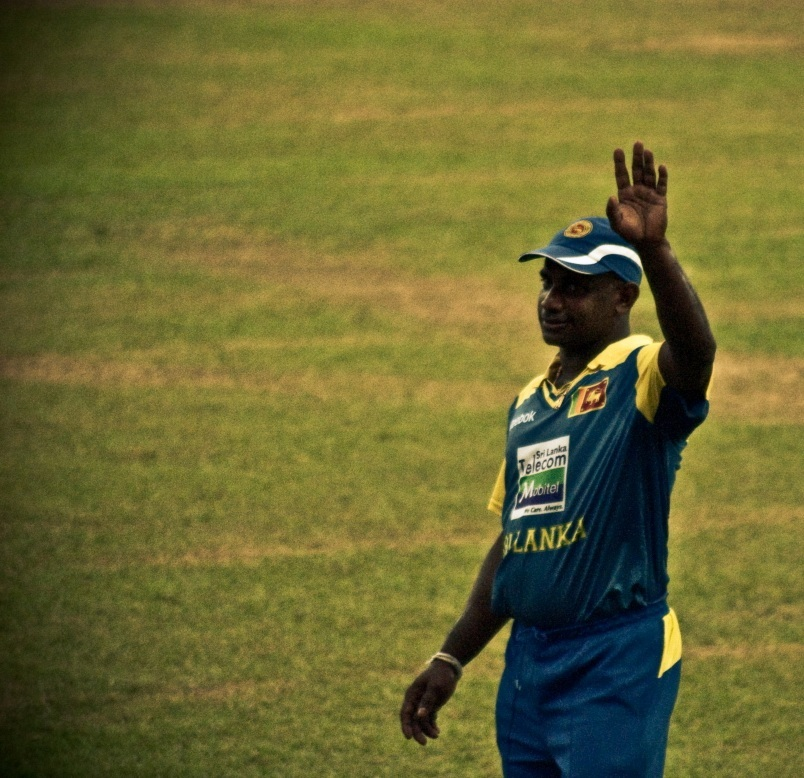
Known as "Master Blaster", Sanath Jayasuriya holds several records for Sri Lanka in One Day International cricket

One Day International (ODI) cricket is played between international cricket teams who are Full Members of the International Cricket Council (ICC) as well as the top four Associate members. Unlike Test matches, ODIs consist of one inning per team, having a limit in the number of overs, currently 50 overs per innings – although in the past this has been 55 or 60 overs. ODI cricket is List-A cricket, so statistics and records set in ODI matches also count toward List-A records. The earliest match recognized as an ODI was played between England and Australia in January 1971; since when there have been over 4,000 ODIs played by 28 teams. This is a list of Sri Lanka Cricket team's One Day International records. It is based on the List of One Day International cricket records, but concentrates solely on records dealing with the Sri Lankan cricket team. Sri Lanka played its first ever ODI in 1975.

== Key ==
The top five records are listed for each category, except for the team wins, losses, draws and ties, all round records and the partnership records. Tied records for fifth place are also included. Explanations of the general symbols and cricketing terms used in the list are given below. Specific details are provided in each category where appropriate. All records include matches played for Sri Lanka only, and are correct as of January 2022.

Key
Symbol	Meaning
†	Player or umpire is currently active in ODI cricket
‡	Even took place during a Cricket World Cup
*	Player remained not out or partnership remained unbroken
♠	One Day International cricket record
Date	Starting date of the match
Innings	Number of innings played
Matches	Number of matches played
Opposition	The team Sri Lanka was playing against
Period	The time period when the player was active in ODI cricket
Player	The player involved in the record
Venue	One Day International cricket ground where the match was played

== Team records ==
=== Overall record ===
Matches	Won	Lost	Tied	NR	Win %
950	438	464	6	42	48.56%
Last Updated: 22 October 2026

=== Team wins, losses, draws and ties ===
As of October 2026, Sri Lanka has played 953 ODI matches resulting in 439 victories, 466 defeats, 6 ties and 42 no results.

Opponent	Matches	Won	Lost	Tied	No Result	% Won	First	Last
Full Members
Afghanistan	15	10	4	0	1	66.66	2014	2024
Australia	105	37	64	0	4	35.23	1975	2025
Bangladesh	60	45	13	0	2	75.00	1986	2025
England	87	40	43	1	3	48.21	1982	2026
India	171	59	99	2	11	34.50	1979	2024
Ireland	5	5	0	0	0	100.00	2007	2023
New Zealand	108	44	54	1	9	40.56	1979	2025
Pakistan	163	60	98	1	4	38.05	1975	2026
South Africa	81	33	46	1	1	40.74	1992	2023
West Indies	69	33	32	0	4	50.76	1975	2026
Zimbabwe	66	51	12	0	3	77.27	1992	2025
Associate Members
Bermuda	1	1	0	0	0	100	2007	2007
Canada	2	2	0	0	0	100	2003	2011
Kenya	6	5	1	0	0	83.33	1996	2011
Netherlands	6	6	0	0	0	100	2002	2023
Oman	1	1	0	0	0	100	2023	2023
Scotland	4	4	0	0	0	100	2011	2023
United Arab Emirates	3	3	0	0	0	100	2004	2023
Total	953	439	466	6	42	48.51	1975	2026
Statistics are correct as of Sri Lanka v Pakistan:at Gaddafi Stadium, Lahore; 31 October 2026

=== First bilateral ODI series wins ===
Opponent	Year of first Home win	Year of first Away win
Afghanistan	2023	YTP
Australia	1982	2010
Bangladesh	2002	2005
England	1993	2006
India	1993	-
Ireland	YTP	2014
Netherlands	YTP	2006
New Zealand	1993	2001
Pakistan	2009	1995
Scotland	YTP	2019
South Africa	2004	-
West Indies	2010	1995
Zimbabwe	1998	1994
Last updated: 7 June 2023

=== First ODI match wins ===
Opponent	Home		Away / Neutral	
Opponent	Venue	Year	Venue	Year
Afghanistan	Pallekele	2022	Mirpur	2014
Australia	Colombo (PSS)	1983	Melbourne	1985
Bangladesh	Kandy	1986	Dhaka	1988
Bermuda	YTP	YTP	Port of Spain	2007 ‡
Canada	Hambantota	2011 ‡	Paarl	2003 ‡
England	Colombo (SSC)	1982	Faisalabad	1996 ‡
India	Colombo (PSS)	1985	Manchester	1979 ‡
Ireland	YTP	YTP	St. George's	2007 ‡
Kenya	Nairobi	1996	Kandy	1996 ‡
Netherlands	Colombo (RPS)	2002	Amstelveen	2006
New Zealand	Moratuwa	1984	Derby	1983 ‡
Oman	YTP	YTP	Bulawayo	2023 ‡
Pakistan	Colombo (SSC)	1986	Lahore	1982
South Africa	Colombo (RPS)	1993	Wellington	1992 ‡
Scotland	YTP	YTP	Edinburgh	2011
United Arab Emirates	Dambulla	2004	Lahore	2008
West Indies	Colombo (RPS)	1993	Rajkot	1989
Zimbabwe	Colombo (SSC)	1996 ‡	New Plymouth	1992 ‡
Last updated: 23 June 2023

=== Winning every match in a series ===
In a bilateral series winning all matches is referred to as whitewash. First such event occurred when West Indies toured England in 1976. Sri Lanka have recorded 20 such series victories.

Opposition	Matches	Host	Season
Zimbabwe	3	Sri Lanka	1997/98
Pakistan	3	Pakistan	1999/00
England	3	Sri Lanka	2000/01
Bangladesh	3	Sri Lanka	2002
Zimbabwe	5	Zimbabwe	2004
South Africa	5	Sri Lanka	2004
Bangladesh	3	Sri Lanka	2005
England	5	England	2006
Bangladesh	3	Sri Lanka	2007
Zimbabwe	5	Zimbabwe	2008/09
Bangladesh	3	Bangladesh	2013/14
West Indies	3	Sri Lanka	2015/16
Bangladesh	3	Sri Lanka	2019
West Indies	3	Sri Lanka	2019/20
Afghanistan	3	Sri Lanka	2023/24
Australia	2	Sri Lanka	2025
Zimbabwe	2	Zimbabwe	2025
Last updated: 1 September 2025

=== Losing every match in a series ===
Sri Lanka have also suffered such whitewash 12 times.

Opposition	Matches	Host	Season
India	3	India	1982/83
New Zealand	3	New Zealand	1982/83
Pakistan	4	Pakistan	1985/86
New Zealand	3	New Zealand	1990/91
India	5	India	2014/15
South Africa	5	South Africa	2016/17
India	5	Sri Lanka	2017
Pakistan	5	United Arab Emirates	2017/18
New Zealand	3	New Zealand	2018/19
South Africa	5	South Africa	2018/19
West Indies	3	West Indies	2020/21
India	3	India	2022/23
Last updated: 7 November 2023

=== Team scoring records ===
==== Most runs in an innings ====
The highest innings total scored in ODIs came in the match between England and Australia in June 2018. Playing in the third ODI at Trent Bridge in Nottingham, the hosts posted a total of 481/6. The first ODI against the Netherlands in July 2006 saw Sri Lanka set their highest innings total of 443/9.

Rank	Score	Opposition	Venue	Date	Scorecard
1	443/9	Netherlands	VRA Cricket Ground, Amstelveen, Netherlands	4 July 2006	Scorecard
2	430/8	England	Rawalpindi Cricket Stadium, Rawalpindi, Pakistan	22 October 2026	Scorecard
3	411/8	India	Madhavrao Scindia Cricket Ground, Rajkot, India	15 December 2009	Scorecard
4	398/5	Kenya	Asgiriya Stadium, Kandy, Sri Lanka	6 March 1996 ‡	Scorecard
5	381/3	Afghanistan	Pallekele International Cricket Stadium, Kandy, Sri Lanka	9 February 2024	Scorecard
Last updated: 22 October 2026

==== Fewest runs in an innings ====
The lowest innings total scored in ODIs has been scored twice. Zimbabwe were dismissed for 35 by Sri Lanka during the third ODI in Sri Lanka's tour of Zimbabwe in April 2004 and USA were dismissed for same score by Nepal in the sixth ODI of the 2020 ICC Cricket World League 2 in Nepal in February 2020. The lowest score in ODI history for Sri Lanka is 43 scored against South Africa in the Sri Lanka's tour of South Africa in 2012.

Rank	Score	Opposition	Venue	Date	Scorecard
1	43	South Africa	Boland Park, Paarl, South Africa	11 January 2012	Scorecard
2	50	India	R.Premadasa Stadium, Colombo, Sri Lanka	17 September 2023	Scorecard
3	55	India	Wankhede Stadium, Mumbai, India	2 November 2023	Scorecard
3	55	West Indies	Sharjah Cricket Stadium, Sharjah, United Arab Emirates	3 December 1986	Scorecard
5	67	England	Old Trafford, Manchester, England	28 May 2014	Scorecard
Last updated: 17 September 2023

==== Most runs conceded an innings ====
Sri Lanka conceded the highest runs of 429 against England in 2026–27 Pakistan ODI Tri-Series.

Rank	Score	Opposition	Venue	Date	Scorecard
1	429/4	England	Rawalpindi Cricket Stadium, Rawalpindi, Pakistan	22 October 2026	Scorecard
2	428/5	South Africa	Arun Jaitley Cricket Stadium, New Delhi, India	7 October 2023	Scorecard
3	414/7	India	Madhavrao Scindia Cricket Ground, Rajkot, India	15 December 2009	Scorecard
4	404/5	India	Eden Gardens, Kolkata, India	13 November 2014	Scorecard
5	392/4	India	Punjab Cricket Association Stadium, Mohali, India	13 December 2017	Scorecard
Last updated: 22 October 2026

==== Fewest runs conceded in an innings ====
The lowest score conceded by Sri Lanka for a full inning is 35 by Zimbabwe during the third ODI in Sri Lanka's tour of Zimbabwe in April 2004

Rank	Score	Opposition	Venue	Date	Scorecard
1	35	Zimbabwe	Harare Sports Club, Harare, Zimbabwe	25 April 2004	Scorecard
2	36	Canada	Boland Park, Paarl, South Africa	19 February 2003 ‡	Scorecard
3	38	Zimbabwe	Sinhalese Sports Club Ground, Colombo, Sri Lanka	8 December 2001	Scorecard
4	54	India	Sharjah Cricket Stadium, Sharjah, United Arab Emirates	29 October 2000	Scorecard
5	67	Zimbabwe	Harare Sports Club, Harare, Zimbabwe	22 November 2008	Scorecard
Last updated: 7 September 2021

==== Most runs aggregate in a match ====
The highest match aggregate scored in ODIs came in the match between South Africa and Australia in the fifth ODI of March 2006 series at Wanderers Stadium, Johannesburg when South Africa scored 438/9 in response to Australia's 434/4. The 3rd ODI of the 2026–27 Pakistan ODI Tri-Series against England in Rawalpindi Cricket Stadium, Rawalpindi saw a total of 859 runs being scored.

Rank	Aggregate	Scores	Venue	Date	Scorecard
1	859/12	England (429/4) v Sri Lanka (430/8)	Rawalpindi Cricket Stadium, Rawalpindi, Pakistan	22 October 2026	Scorecard
2	825/15	India (414/7) v Sri Lanka (411/8)	Madhavrao Scindia Cricket Ground, Rajkot, India	15 December 2009	Scorecard
3	754/15	South Africa (428/5) v Sri Lanka (326)	Arun Jaitley Stadium, Delhi, India	7 October 2023 ‡	Scorecard
4	720/9	Sri Lanka (381/3) v Afghanistan (339/6)	Pallekele International Cricket Stadium, Kandy	9 February 2024	Scorecard
5	697/17	New Zealand (371/7) v Sri Lanka (326)	Bay Oval, Mount Maunganui, New Zealand	3 January 2019	Scorecard
Last updated: 22 October 2026

==== Fewest runs aggregate in a match ====
The lowest match aggregate in ODIs is 71 when USA were dismissed for 35 by Nepal in the sixth ODI of the 2020 ICC Cricket World League 2 in Nepal in February 2020. The lowest match aggregate in ODI history for Sri Lanka is 73 scored during the 2003 Cricket World Cup against Canada.

Rank	Aggregate	Scores	Venue	Date	Scorecard
1	73/11	Canada (36) v Sri Lanka (37/1)	Boland Park, Paarl, South Africa	19 February 2003 ‡	Scorecard
2	75/11	Zimbabwe (35) v Sri Lanka (40/1)	Harare Sports Club, Harare, Zimbabwe	25 April 2004	Scorecard
3	78/11	Zimbabwe (38) v Sri Lanka (40/1)	Sinhalese Sports Club Ground, Colombo, Sri Lanka	8 December 2001	Scorecard
4	101/10	Sri Lanka (50) v India (51/0)	R.Premadasa Stadium, Colombo, Sri Lanka	17 September 2023	Scorecard
5	135/11	Zimbabwe (67) v Sri Lanka (68/1)	Harare Sports Club, Harare, Zimbabwe	22 November 2008	Scorecard
Last updated: 17 September 2023

=== Result records ===
An ODI match is won when one side has scored more runs than the total runs scored by the opposing side during their innings. If both sides have completed both their allocated innings and the side that fielded last has the higher aggregate of runs, it is known as a win by runs. This indicates the number of runs that they had scored more than the opposing side. If the side batting last wins the match, it is known as a win by wickets, indicating the number of wickets that were still to fall.

==== Greatest win margins (by runs) ====
The greatest winning margin by runs in ODIs was England's victory over South Africa by 342 runs in the third and final ODI of South Africa's 2025 tour of England. The largest victory recorded by Sri Lanka was during the final of the 2000 Champions Trophy in Sharjah by 245 runs against India.

Rank	Margin	Target	Opposition	Venue	Date
1	245 Runs	300	India	Sharjah Cricket Stadium, Sharjah, United Arab Emirates	29 October 2000
2	243 Runs	322	Bermuda	Queen's Park Oval, Port of Spain, Trinidad & Tobago	15 March 2007 ‡
3	234 Runs	310	Pakistan	Gaddafi Stadium, Lahore, Pakistan	24 January 2009
4	219 Runs	352	England	Ranasinghe Premadasa Stadium, Colombo, Sri Lanka	23 October 2018
5	210 Runs	333	Canada	Mahinda Rajapaksa International Stadium, Hambantota, Sri Lanka	20 February 2011 ‡
Last updated: 7 September 2021

==== Greatest win margins (by balls remaining) ====
The greatest winning margin by balls remaining in ODIs was England's victory over Canada by 8 wickets with 277 balls remaining in the 1979 Cricket World Cup. The largest victory recorded by Sri Lanka is during the Zimbabwe's tour of Sri Lanka in 2001 when they won by 9 wickets with 274 balls remaining.

Rank	Balls remaining	Margin	Opposition	Venue	Date
1	274	9 wickets	Zimbabwe	Sinhalese Sports Club Ground, Colombo, Sri Lanka	8 December 2001
2	272	9 wickets	Canada	Boland Park, Paarl, South Africa	19 February 2003 ‡
3	244	9 wickets	Zimbabwe	Harare Sports Club, Harare, Zimbabwe	25 April 2004
4	240	8 wickets	Ireland	National Cricket Stadium, St. George's, Grenada	18 April 2007 ‡
5	229	10 wickets	Bangladesh	Shere-e-Bangla Stadium, Mirpur, Bangladesh	25 January 2018
Last updated: 7 September 2021

==== Greatest win margins (by wickets) ====
A total of 55 matches have ended with chasing team winning by 10 wickets with West Indies winning by such margins a record 10 times. Sri Lanka have won an ODI match by this margin on six occasions.

Rank	Margin	Opposition	Venue	Date
1	10 wickets	England	Sinhalese Sports Club Ground, Colombo, Sri Lanka	27 March 2001
1	10 wickets	Bangladesh	City Oval, Pietermaritzburg, South Africa	14 February 2003 ‡
1	10 wickets	England	Rangiri Dambulla International Stadium, Dambulla, Sri Lanka	18 November 2003
1	10 wickets	Bangladesh	Ranasinghe Premadasa Stadium, Colombo, Sri Lanka	23 July 2004
1	10 wickets	England	Ranasinghe Premadasa Stadium, Colombo, Sri Lanka	26 March 2011 ‡
1	10 wickets	Bangladesh	Shere-e-Bangla Stadium, Mirpur, Bangladesh	25 January 2018
1	10 wickets	Oman	Queens Sports Club, Zimbabwe	23 June 2023 ‡
Last updated: 23 June 2023

==== Highest successful run chases ====
South Africa holds the record for the highest successful run chase which they achieved when they scored 438/9 in response to Australia's 434/9. Sri Lanka's highest innings total while chasing is 430/8 in a successful run chase against England at Rawalpindi Cricket Stadium, Rawalpindi during the 2026–27 Pakistan ODI Tri-Series.

Rank	Score	Target	Opposition	Venue	Date
1	430/8	429	England	Rawalpindi Cricket Stadium, Rawalpindi, Pakistan	22 October 2026
2	324/2	322	England	Headingley, Leeds, England	1 July 2006
2	322/3	322	India	The Oval, London, England	8 June 2017
4	314/6	314	Afghanistan	Pallekele Cricket Stadium, Kandy, Sri Lanka	30 November 2022
5	314/8	313	South Africa	New Wanderers Stadium, Johannesburg, South Africa	22 January 2012
5	313/7	313	Zimbabwe	Pukekura Park, New Plymouth, New Zealand	23 February 1992 ‡
5	313/6	313	West Indies	Kensington Oval, Bridgetown, Barbados	8 June 2003
Last updated: 22 October 2026

==== Narrowest win margins (by runs) ====
The narrowest run margin victory is by 1 run which has been achieved in 31 ODI's with Australia winning such games a record 6 times. Sri Lanka has achieved any victory by 1 run on two occasions.

Rank	Margin	Opposition	Venue	Date
1	1 run	Australia	Rangiri Dambulla International Stadium, Dambulla, Sri Lanka	22 February 2004
1	1 run	West Indies	Queens Sports Club, Bulawayo, Zimbabwe	23 November 2016
3	2 runs	India	Ranasinghe Premadasa Stadium, Colombo, Sri Lanka	17 August 1997
3	2 runs	England	Sir Vivian Richards Stadium, Antigua, Antigua & Barbuda	4 April 2007 ‡
3	2 runs	Afghanistan	Gaddafi Stadium, Lahore, Pakistan	5 September 2023
5	3 runs	England	Sinhalese Sports Club Ground, Colombo, Sri Lanka	14 February 1982
5	3 runs	New Zealand	Seddon Park, Hamilton, New Zealand	8 February 2001
5	3 runs	South Africa	Pallekele Cricket Stadium, Kandy, Sri Lanka	8 August 2018
Last updated: 5 September 2023

==== Narrowest win margins (by balls remaining) ====
The narrowest winning margin by balls remaining in ODIs is by winning of the last ball which has been achieved 36 times with both South Africa winning seven times. Sri Lanka has yet to achieve a victory by this margin.

Rank	Balls remaining	Margin	Opposition	Venue	Date
1	0	2 wickets	Pakistan	R.Premadasa Stadium, Colombo, Sri Lanka	14 September 2023
2	1	3 wickets	South Africa	Basin Reserve, Wellington, New Zealand	2 March 1992 ‡
2	1	4 wickets	India	Gandhi Stadium, Jalandhar, India	20 February 1994
2	1	2 wickets	South Africa	New Wanderers Stadium, Johannesburg, South Africa	22 January 2012
2	1	2 wickets	England	Rawalpindi Cricket Stadium, Rawalpindi, Pakistan	22 October 2026
6	2	4 wickets	Pakistan	Multan Cricket Stadium, Multan, Pakistan	17 January 1992
6	2	4 wickets	Pakistan	Rawalpindi Cricket Stadium, Rawalpindi, Pakistan	3 October 1995
6	2	3 wickets	Australia	Melbourne Cricket Ground, Melbourne, Australia	16 January 1996
6	2	1 wicket	England	Adelaide Oval, Adelaide, Australia	23 January 1999
6	2	2 wickets	Pakistan	Ranasinghe Premadasa Stadium, Colombo, Sri Lanka	18 June 2012
6	2	2 wickets	Pakistan	Dubai International Cricket Stadium, Dubai, United Arab Emirates	20 December 2013
6	2	2 wickets	Pakistan	Sheikh Zayed Cricket Stadium, Abu Dhabi, United Arab Emirates	27 December 2013
6	2	6 wickets	England	Ranasinghe Premadasa Stadium, Colombo, Sri Lanka	7 December 2014
Last updated: 7 September 2021

==== Narrowest win margins (by wickets) ====
The narrowest margin of victory by wickets is 1 wicket which has settled 55 such ODIs. Both West Indies and New Zealand have recorded such victory on eight occasions. Sri Lanka has won the match by a margin of one wicket on four occasions.

Rank	Margin	Opposition	Venue	Date
1	1 wicket	England	Adelaide Oval, Adelaide, Australia	23 January 1999
1	1 wicket	Australia	Melbourne Cricket Ground, Melbourne, Australia	3 November 2010
1	1 wicket	West Indies	Ranasinghe Premadasa Stadium, Colombo, Sri Lanka	1 November 2015
1	1 wicket	West Indies	Sinhalese Sports Club Ground, Colombo, Sri Lanka	22 February 2020
5	2 wickets	Australia	Paikiasothy Saravanamuttu Stadium, Colombo, Sri Lanka	13 April 1983
5	2 wickets	South Africa	Nairobi Club Ground, Nairobi, Kenya	1 October 1996
5	2 wickets	Zimbabwe	Harare Sports Club, Harare, Zimbabwe	28 November 2008
5	2 wickets	Bangladesh	Shere-e-Bangla Stadium, Mirpur, Bangladesh	16 January 2009
5	2 wickets	South Africa	New Wanderers Stadium, Johannesburg, South Africa	22 January 2012
5	2 wickets	Pakistan	Ranasinghe Premadasa Stadium, Colombo, Sri Lanka	18 June 2012
5	2 wickets	Pakistan	Dubai International Cricket Stadium, Dubai, United Arab Emirates	20 December 2013
5	2 wickets	Pakistan	Sheikh Zayed Cricket Stadium, Abu Dhabi, United Arab Emirates	27 December 2013
5	2 wickets	India	Fatullah Osmani Stadium, Fatullah, Bangladesh	28 February 2014
5	2 wickets	Pakistan	Asgiriya Stadium, Kandy, Sri Lanka	15 July 2015
5	2 wickets	Pakistan	R.Premadasa Stadium, Colombo, Sri Lanka	14 September 2023
5	2 wickets	Zimbabwe	R.Premadasa Stadium, Colombo, Sri Lanka	8 January 2024
5	2 wickets	England	Rawalpindi Cricket Stadium, Rawalpindi, Pakistan	22 October 2026
Last updated: 22 October 2026

==== Greatest loss margins (by runs) ====
Sri Lanka's biggest defeat by runs was against India in the Sri Lanka's tour of India in early 2023 at Greenfield International Stadium, Thiruvananthapuram, India.

Rank	Margin	Opposition	Venue	Date
1	317 Runs	India	Greenfield International Stadium, Thiruvananthapuram, India	15 January 2023
2	302 Runs	India	Wankhede Stadium, Mumbai, India	2 November 2023
3	258 Runs	South Africa	Boland Park, Paarl	11 January 2012
4	232 Runs	Australia	Adelaide Oval, Adelaide, Australia	28 January 1985
5	217 Runs	Pakistan	Sharjah Cricket Stadium, Sharjah, United Arab Emirates	17 April 2002
Last updated: 6 December 2024

==== Greatest loss margins (by balls remaining) ====
The greatest winning margin by balls remaining in ODIs was England's victory over Canada by 8 wickets with 277 balls remaining in the 1979 Cricket World Cup. The largest defeat suffered by Sri Lanka was against New Zealand in New Zealand during the Sri Lanka's tour of New Zealand in late 20515 when they lost by 10 wickets with 250 balls remaining.

Rank	Balls remaining	Margin	Opposition	Venue	Date
1	263	10 wickets	India	R.Premadasa Stadium, Colombo, Sri Lanka	17 September 2023
2	250	10 wickets	New Zealand	AMI Stadium, Christchurch, New Zealand	28 December 2015
3	236	9 wickets	West Indies	Old Trafford, Manchester, England	7 June 1975 ‡
4	227	10 wickets	England	Old Trafford, Manchester, England	28 May 2014
5	215	9 wickets	England	Headingley, Leeds, England	20 June 1983 ‡
Last updated: 7 September 2021

==== Greatest loss margins (by wickets) ====
Sri Lanka have lost an ODI match by a margin of 10 wickets on six occasions with most recent being during the 2019 Cricket World Cup game against New Zealand.

Rank	Margins	Opposition	Most recent venue	Date
1	10 wickets	India	Sharjah Cricket Stadium, Sharjah, United Arab Emirates	8 April 1984
1	10 wickets	England	Trent Bridge, Nottingham, England	6 July 2011
1	10 wickets	England	Old Trafford, Manchester, England	28 May 2014
1	10 wickets	New Zealand	Hagley Oval, Christchurch, New Zealand	28 December 2015
1	10 wickets	England	Edgbaston, Birmingham, England	24 June 2016
1	10 wickets	New Zealand	SWALEC Stadium, Cardiff, England	1 June 2019 ‡
1	10 wickets	India	R.Premadasa Stadium, Colombo, Sri Lanka	17 September 2023
Last updated: 7 September 2021

==== Narrowest loss margins (by runs) ====
The narrowest loss of Sri Lanka in terms of runs is by 1 runs suffered once.

Rank	Margin	Opposition	Venue	Date
1	1 run	India	Ranasinghe Premadasa Stadium, Colombo, Sri Lanka	25 July 1993
2	2 runs	New Zealand	Sharjah Cricket Stadium, Sharjah, United Arab Emirates	18 April 1994
2	2 runs	Zimbabwe	Harare Sports Club, Harare, Zimbabwe	5 November 1994
4	4 runs	New Zealand	Seddon Park, Hamilton, New Zealand	8 February 2001
4	4 runs	India	Madhavrao Scindia Cricket Ground, Rajkot, India	15 December 2009
Last updated: 7 September 2021

==== Narrowest loss margins (by balls remaining) ====
The narrowest winning margin by balls remaining in ODIs is by winning of the last ball which has been achieved 36 times with both South Africa winning seven times. Sri Lanka has suffered loss by this margin three times.

Rank	Balls remaining	Margin	Opposition	Venue	Date
1	0	1 wicket	New Zealand	Queenstown Events Centre, Queenstown, New Zealand	31 December 2006
1	0	1 wicket	West Indies	Queen's Park Oval, Port of Spain, Trinidad & Tobago	10 April 2008
1	0	4 wickets	New Zealand	Mahinda Rajapaksa International Stadium, Hambantota, Sri Lanka	12 November 2013
4	1	4 wickets	New Zealand	Adelaide Oval, Adelaide, Australia	9 January 1988
4	1	4 wickets	Pakistan	Mahinda Rajapaksa International Stadium, Hambantota, Sri Lanka	23 August 2014
Last updated: 7 September 2021

==== Narrowest loss margins (by wickets) ====
Sri Lanka has suffered defeat by 1 wicket on five occasions.

Rank	Margin	Opposition	Venue	Date
1	1 wicket	New Zealand	Queenstown Events Centre, Queenstown, NZ	31 December 2006
1	1 wicket	South Africa	Providence Stadium, Providence, West Indies	28 March 2007 ‡
1	1 wicket	West Indies	Queen's Park Oval, Port of Spain, Trinidad & Tobago	10 April 2008
1	1 wicket	New Zealand	SWALEC Stadium, Cardiff, ENG	9 June 2013
1	1 wicket	India	Queen's Park Oval, Port of Spain, Trinidad & Tobago	11 July 2013
Last updated: 7 September 2021

=== Most consecutive wins ===
Wins	First win	Last win
13	Afghanistan at Hambantota, 4 June 2023	Bangladesh at Colombo, 9 September 2023
10	Australia at Colombo, 29 February 2004	Bangladesh at Colombo, 23 July 2004
10	Pakistan at Abu Dhabi, 27 December 2013	Ireland at Dublin, 6 May 2014
7	West Indies at Port of Spain, 13 April 1996	South Africa at Nairobi, 1 October 1996
7	South Africa at Tangier, 15 August 2002	Australia at Colombo, 27 September 2002
7	India at Colombo, 1 August 2004	Zimbabwe at London, 13 September 2004
7	England at London, 17 June 2006	Netherlands at Amstelveen, 6 July 2006
7	India at Colombo, 29 August 2008	Zimbabwe at Mirpur, 12 January 2009
Last updated: 9 September 2023

=== Most consecutive Allout dismissal ===
Allout dismissal	Team	First Team	Last Team
14	Sri Lanka	Afghanistan at Hambantota, 4 June 2023	India at Colombo, 12 September 2023
10	Australia	India at Punjab, 2 November 2009	West Indies at Adelaide, 9 February 2010
9	Australia	Afghanistan at Perth, 4 March 2015	England at London, 5 September 2015
Last updated: 15 September 2023

==== Tied matches ====
A tie can occur when the scores of both teams are equal at the conclusion of play, provided that the side batting last has completed their innings. There have been 37 ties in ODIs history with Sri Lanka involved in five such games.

Opposition	Venue	Date
New Zealand	Sharjah Cricket Stadium, Sharjah, United Arab Emirates	11 November 1996
Pakistan	Sharjah Cricket Stadium, Sharjah, United Arab Emirates	15 October 1999
South Africa	Sahara Stadium, Kingsmead, Durban, South Africa	3 March 2003 ‡
India	Adelaide Oval, Adelaide, Australia	14 February 2012
England	Trent Bridge, Nottingham, England	21 June 2016
India	R.Premadasa Stadium, Colombo, Sri Lanka	22 August 2024
Last updated: 5 July 2025

== Individual records ==
=== Batting records ===
==== Most career runs ====
A run is the basic means of scoring in cricket. A run is scored when the batsman hits the ball with his bat and with his partner runs the length of 22 yards (20 m) of the pitch. India's Sachin Tendulkar has scored the most runs in ODIs with 18,426. Second is Kumar Sangakkara of Sri Lanka with 14,234 ahead of Ricky Ponting from Australia in third with 13,704.

Rank	Runs	Player	Matches	Innings	Period
1	13,975	Kumar Sangakkara	397	373	2000–2015
2	13,364	Sanath Jayasuriya	441	429	1989–2011
3	12,381	Mahela Jayawardene	443	413	1998–2015
4	10,290	Tillakaratne Dilshan	330	303	1999–2016
5	9,284	Aravinda de Silva	308	296	1984–2003
6	8,529	Marvan Atapattu	268	259	1990–2007
7	7,456	Arjuna Ranatunga	269	255	1982–1999
8	6,941	Upul Tharanga	234	222	2005–2019
9	5,916	Angelo Mathews	226	195	2008–2023
10	5,162	Roshan Mahanama	213	198	1986–1999
Last updated: 18 January 2025 (Matches played for ICC excluded here)

==== Fastest runs getter ====
Runs	Batsman	Match	Innings	Record Date	Reference
1000	Roy Dias	29	27	17 January 1985	
2000	Pathum Nissanka†	52	52	14 February 2024	
3000	Upul Tharanga	97	93	9 June 2010	
4000	Upul Tharanga	124	119	16 August 2011	
5000	Marvan Atapattu	154	152	11 July 2002	
6000	Marvan Atapattu	182	180	14 February 2003 ‡	
7000	Marvan Atapattu	218	213	25 August 2004	
8000	Marvan Atapattu	245	239	22 January 2006	
9000	Kumar Sangakkara	288	270	18 March 2011 ‡	
10000	Tillakaratne Dilshan	319	293	26 July 2015	
11000	Kumar Sangakkara	340	318	28 March 2013	
12000	Kumar Sangakkara	359	336	20 December 2013	
13000	Kumar Sangakkara	386	363	3 December 2014	
14000	Kumar Sangakkara	402	378	8 March 2015 ‡	

==== Most runs in each batting position ====
Batting position	Batsman	Innings	Runs	Average	Career Span	Ref
Opener	Sanath Jayasuriya	379	12,674	34.81	1989&-2011	
Number 3	Kumar Sangakkara	234	9,611	44.70	2000–2015	
Number 4	Aravinda de Silva	197	6,870	39.25	1984–2003	
Number 5	Arjuna Ranatunga	153	4,675 ♠	38.63	1982–1999	
Number 6	Tillakaratne Dilshan	87	2,046	28.81	2009–2019	
Number 7	Thisara Perera	53	1,003	20.46	2009–2021	
Number 8	Chaminda Vaas	102	1,061	15.37	1994-2008	
Number 9	Chaminda Vaas	68	552	13.14	1994-2008	
Number 10	Muttiah Muralitharan	69	337	7.83	1993-2011	
Number 11	Muttiah Muralitharan	58	170	5.66	1993-2011	
Last updated: 7 September 2021. Qualification: Batted 20 Innings at the position

==== Most runs against each team ====
Opposition	Runs	Batsman	Matches	Innings	Career Span	Ref
Afghanistan	688	Pathum Nissanka†	11	11	2022–2024	
Australia	1,675	Kumar Sangakkara	43	43	2002–2015	
Bangladesh	1,206	Kumar Sangakkara	31	28	2002–2015	
Bermuda	85	Mahela Jayawardene	1	1	2007–2007	
Canada	100	Mahela Jayawardene	1	1	2003–2011	
England	1,625	Kumar Sangakkara	44	41	2001–2015	
India	2,899	Sanath Jayasuriya	89	85	1990–2009	
Ireland	167	Kusal Perera	3	3	2014–2016	
Kenya	251	Aravinda de Silva	4	4	1996–2003	
Netherlands	193	Sanath Jayasuriya	2	2	2002–2006	
New Zealand	1,568	Kumar Sangakkara	47	45	2001–2015	
Oman	61	Dimuth Karunaratne	1	1	2023–2023	
Pakistan	2,517	Sanath Jayasuriya	82	79	1989–2009	
South Africa	1,789	Kumar Sangakkara	44	43	2000–2015	
Scotland	144	Dimuth Karunaratne	3	3	2011–2023	
United Arab Emirates	87	Mahela Jayawardene	2	2	2004–2008	
West Indies	922	Sanath Jayasuriya	30	30	1993–2007	
Zimbabwe	906	Marvan Atapattu	28	25	1996–2006	
Last updated: 14 February 2024

==== Highest individual score ====
The fourth ODI of the Sri Lanka's tour of India in 2014 saw Rohit Sharma score the highest Individual score. Pathum Nissanka holds the Sri Lankan record when he scored 210 against Afghanistan in February 2024 at Kandy.

Rank	Runs	Player	Opposition	Venue	Date
1	210*	Pathum Nissanka †	Afghanistan	Pallekele International Cricket Stadium, Kandy, Sri Lanka	9 February 2024
2	189	Sanath Jayasuriya	India	Sharjah Cricket Stadium, Sharjah, United Arab Emirates	29 October 2000
3	174*	Upul Tharanga	India	Sabina Park, Kingston, Jamaica	2 July 2013
4	169	Kumar Sangakkara	South Africa	Ranasinghe Premadasa Stadium, Colombo, Sri Lanka	20 July 2013
5	161*	Tillakaratne Dilshan	Bangladesh	Melbourne Cricket Ground, Melbourne, Australia	26 February 2015 ‡
Last updated: 9 February 2024

==== Highest individual score – progression of record ====
Runs	Player	Opponent	Venue	Season
21	Somachandra de Silva	West Indies	Old Trafford, Manchester, England	1975 ‡
53*	Sunil Wettimuny	Australia	The Oval, London, England	1975 ‡
59	Anura Tennekoon	New Zealand	Trent Bridge, Nottingham, England	1979 ‡
67	Sunil Wettimuny	India	Old Trafford, Manchester, England	1979 ‡
86*	Sidath Wettimuny	England	Sinhalese Sports Club Ground, Colombo, Sri Lanka	1981–82
102	Roy Dias	India	Arun Jaitley Stadium, New Delhi, India	1982
121	Roy Dias	India	M. Chinnaswamy Stadium, Bangalore, India	1982
140	Sanath Jayasuriya	New Zealand	Goodyear Park, Bloemfontein, South Africa	1994–95
145	Aravinda de Silva	Kenya	Asgiriya Stadium, Kandy, Sri Lanka	1995-96 ‡
151*	Sanath Jayasuriya	India	Wankhede Stadium, Mumbai, India	1997
189	Sanath Jayasuriya	India	Sharjah Cricket Stadium, Sharjah, United Arab Emirates	2000–2001
210*	Pathum Nissanka †	Afghanistan	Pallekele International Cricket Stadium, Kandy, Sri Lanka	2023-2024
Last updated: 9 February 2024

==== Highest individual score against each team ====
Opposition	Batsman	Runs	Venue	Date	Ref
Afghanistan	Pathum Nissanka †	210*	Pallekele International Cricket Stadium, Kandy, Sri Lanka	9 February 2024	
Australia	Pathum Nissanka †	137	R. Premadasa Stadium, Colombo, Sri Lanka	19 June 2022	
Bangladesh	Tillakaratne Dilshan	161*	Rangiri Dambulla International Stadium, Dambulla, Sri Lanka	26 February 2015 ‡	
Bermuda	Mahela Jayawardene	85	Queen's Park Oval, Port of Spain, Trinidad & Tobago	15 March 2007 ‡	
Canada	Mahela Jayawardene	100	Mahinda Rajapaksa International Stadium, Hambantota, Sri Lanka	20 February 2011 ‡	
England	Sanath Jayasuriya	152	Headingley, Leeds, England	1 July 2006	
India	Sanath Jayasuriya	189	Sharjah Cricket Stadium, Sharjah, United Arab Emirates	29 October 2000	
Ireland	Kusal Perera †	135	Malahide Cricket Club Ground, Dublin, Ireland	18 June 2016	
Kenya	Aravinda de Silva	145	Asgiriya Stadium, Kandy, Sri Lanka	6 March 1996 ‡	
Netherlands	Sanath Jayasuriya	157	VRA Cricket Ground, Amstelveen, Netherlands	4 July 2006	
New Zealand	Kusal Mendis†	143	Rangiri Dambulla International Stadium, Dambulla, Sri Lanka	13 November 2024	
Pakistan	Tillakaratne Dilshan	137*	Gaddafi Stadium, Lahore, Pakistan	24 January 2009	
South Africa	Kumar Sangakkara	169	Ranasinghe Premadasa Stadium, Colombo, Sri Lanka	20 July 2013 ‡	
Scotland	Kumar Sangakkara	124	Bellerive Oval, Hobart, Australia	11 March 2015	
Oman	Dimuth Karunaratne	61*	Queens Sports Club, Zimbabwe	23 June 2023 ‡	
United Arab Emirates	Kusal Mendis †	78	Queens Sports Club, Zimbabwe	19 June 2023	
West Indies	Avishka Gunawardene	132	Gymkhana Club Ground, Nairobi, Kenya	4 October 2000	
Zimbabwe	Tillakaratne Dilshan	144	Pallekele International Cricket Stadium, Kandy, Sri Lanka	10 March 2011 ‡	
Last updated: 19 November 2024.

==== Highest career average ====
A batsman's batting average is the total number of runs they have scored divided by the number of times they have been dismissed.

Rank	Average	Player	Innings	Runs	Not out	Period
1	44.81	Janith Liyanage†	41	1,210	8	2024–2026
2	42.06	Charith Asalanka†	75	2,734	10	2021–2026
3	41.96	Kumar Sangakkara	373	13,975	40	2000–2015
4	40.55	Pathum Nissanka†	77	2,920	5	2021–2026
5	40.24	Angelo Mathews	195	5,916	48	2008–2023
Minimum 20 Innings, Last updated: 22 October 2026

==== Highest Average in each batting position ====
Batting position	Batsman	Innings	Runs	Average	Career Span	Ref
Opener	Tillakaratne Dilshan	179	7,367	46.04	2008–2016	
Number 3	Kumar Sangakkara	234	9,611	44.70	2000–2015	
Number 4	Arjuna Ranatunga	36	1,272	42.40	1984–1999	
Number 5	Angelo Mathews	87	3,116	51.08	2009–2020	
Number 6	Russel Arnold	59	1,703	44.81	1999–2007	
Number 7	Angelo Mathews	21	532	33.25	2008–2012	
Number 8	Kumar Dharmasena	42	719	29.95	1994–2004	
Number 9	Nuwan Kulasekara	45	448	16.00	2003–2017	
Number 10	Ajantha Mendis	20	119	14.87	2008–2015	
Number 11	Dilhara Fernando	34	108	7.71	2001–2012	
Last updated: 11 January 2025.

==== Most half-centuries ====
A half-century is a score of between 50 and 99 runs. Statistically, once a batsman's score reaches 100, it is no longer considered a half-century but a century.

Sachin Tendulkar of India has scored the most half-centuries in ODIs with 96. He is followed by the Sri Lanka's Kumar Sangakkara on 93, South Africa's Jacques Kallis on 86 and India's Rahul Dravid and Pakistan's Inzamam-ul-Haq on 83.

Rank	Half centuries	Player	Innings	Runs	Period
1	93	Kumar Sangakkara	373	13,975	2000–2015
2	75	Mahela Jayawardene	413	12,381	1998–2015
3	68	Sanath Jayasuriya	429	13,364	1989–2011
4	64	Aravinda de Silva	296	9,284	1984–2003
5	59	Marvan Atapattu	259	8,529	1990–2007
Last updated: 31 December 2015

==== Most centuries ====
A century is a score of 100 or more runs in a single innings.

Tendulkar has also scored the most centuries in ODIs with 49. Sanath Jayasuriya has the most centuries for Sri Lanka.

Rank	Centuries	Player	Innings	Runs	Period
1	28	Sanath Jayasuriya	429	13,364	1989–2011
2	25	Kumar Sangakkara	373	13,975	2000–2015
3	22	Tillakaratne Dilshan	303	10,290	1999–2016
4	18	Mahela Jayawardene	413	12,381	1998–2015
5	15	Upul Tharanga	222	6,941	2005–2019
Last updated: 7 September 2021

==== Most Sixes ====
Rank	Sixes	Player	Innings	Runs	Period
1	268	Sanath Jayasuriya	429	13,364	1989–2011
2	102	Aravinda de Silva	296	9,284	1984–2003
3	90	Angelo Mathews	195	5,916	2008–2023
4	86	Kumar Sangakkara	373	13,975	2000–2015
5	84	Thisara Perera	133	2,338	2009–2020
Last updated: 9 November 2023

==== Most Fours ====
Rank	Fours	Player	Innings	Runs	Period
1	1493	Sanath Jayasuriya	429	13,364	1989–2011
2	1349	Kumar Sangakkara	373	13,975	2000–2015
3	1111	Tillakaratne Dilshan	303	10,290	1999–2016
4	1098	Mahela Jayawardene	413	12,381	1998–2015
5	796	Upul Tharanga	222	6,941	2005–2019
Last updated: 7 September 2021

==== Highest strike rates ====
Andre Russell of West Indies holds the record for highest strike rate, with minimum 500 balls faced qualification, with 130.22. Thisara Perera is the Sri Lankan with the highest strike rate.

Rank	Strike rate	Player	Runs	Balls Faced	Period
1	112.08	Thisara Perera	2,338	2,086	2009–2021
2	109.66	Wanindu Hasaranga†	1,133	1,035	2017–2026
3	98.28	Milinda Siriwardana	516	525	2015–2019
4	93.41	Niroshan Dickwella	1,604	1,717	2014–2022
5	92.88	Kusal Perera	3,237	3,485	2013–2023
Qualification= 500 balls faced. Last updated: 31 January 2026

==== Highest strike rates in an inning ====
James Franklin of New Zealand's strike rate of 387.50 during his 31* off 8 balls against Canada during 2011 Cricket World Cup is the world record for highest strike rate in an innings. Kusal Mendis holds the top position for a Sri Lanka player in this list.

Rank	Strike rate	Player	Runs	Balls Faced	Opposition	Venue	Date
1	311.11	Kusal Mendis†	28	9	Bangladesh	Shere-e-Bangla Stadium, Mirpur, Bangladesh	27 January 2018
2	300.00	Farveez Maharoof	27*	9	Bangladesh	MA Aziz Stadium, Chittagong, Bangladesh	25 February 2006
3	272.00	Kusal Perera†	68	25	Pakistan	Pallekele International Cricket Stadium, Kandy, Sri Lanka	15 July 2015
4	271.43	Sanath Jayasuriya	76	28	Pakistan	Singapore Cricket Club Ground, Singapore, Singapore	7 April 1996
5	260.00	Ashan Priyanjan	39*	15	Pakistan	Mahinda Rajapaksa International Stadium, Hambantota, Sri Lanka	23 August 2014
Last updated: 7 September 2021

==== Most runs in a calendar year ====
Tendulkar holds the record for most runs scored in a calendar year with 1894 runs scored in 1998. Sangakkara scored 1333 runs in 2006, the most for a Sri Lankan batsmen in a year.

Rank	Runs	Player	Matches	Innings	Year
1	1,333	Kumar Sangakkara	36	33	2006
2	1,260	Mahela Jayawardene	34	31	2001
3	1,256	Kumar Sangakkara	28	28	2014
4	1,244	Angelo Mathews	32	31	2014
5	1,212	Aravinda de Silva	28	27	1997
Last updated: 7 September 2021

==== Most runs in a series ====
The 1980-81 Benson & Hedges World Series Cup in Australia saw Greg Chappell set the record for the most runs scored in a single series scoring 685 runs. He is followed by Sachin Tendulkar with 673 runs scored in the 2003 Cricket World Cup. Mahela Jayawardene has scored the most runs in a series for a Sri Lanka batsmen, when he scored 548 runs in the 2007 Cricket World Cup.

Rank	Runs	Player	Matches	Innings	Series
1	583	Charith Asalanka†	16	15	2020–2023 ICC Cricket World Cup Super League
2	548	Mahela Jayawardene	11	11	2007 Cricket World Cup
3	541	Kumar Sangakkara	7	7	2015 Cricket World Cup
4	513	Tillakaratne Dilshan	11	11	2011–12 Commonwealth Bank Series
5	500	Tillakaratne Dilshan	9	9	2011 Cricket World Cup
Last updated: 8 July 2023

==== Most ducks ====
A duck refers to a batsman being dismissed without scoring a run. Sanath Jayasuriya has scored the equal highest number of ducks in ODIs with 34 such knocks.

Rank	Ducks	Player	Matches	Innings	Period
1	34	Sanath Jayasuriya	441	429	1989–2011
2	28	Mahela Jayawardene	443	413	1998–2015
3	26	Lasith Malinga	226	119	2004–2019
4	25	Chaminda Vaas	321	219	1994–2008
5	24	Romesh Kaluwitharana	189	181	1990–2004
5	24	Muttiah Muralitharan	343	161	1993–2011
Last updated: 7 September 2021

== Bowling records ==
=== Most career wickets ===
A bowler takes the wicket of a batsman when the form of dismissal is bowled, caught, leg before wicket, stumped or hit wicket. If the batsman is dismissed by run out, obstructing the field, handling the ball, hitting the ball twice or timed out the bowler does not receive credit.

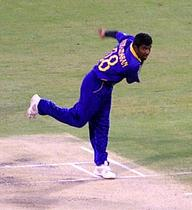
Murli Holds several bowling records for Sri Lanka

Muttiah Muralitharan widely acknowledged as one of the greatest bowlers of all time is the highest wicket-taker in ODIs.

Rank	Wickets	Player	Matches	Innings	Runs	Period
1	534	Muttiah Muralitharan♠	343	334	12,066	1993–2011
2	400	Chaminda Vaas	321	319	10,955	1994–2008
3	338	Lasith Malinga	226	220	9,760	2004–2019
4	320	Sanath Jayasuriya	441	365	11,737	1989–2011
5	199	Nuwan Kulasekara	184	181	6,751	2003–2017
6	183	Dilhara Fernando	146	140	5,612	2001–2012
7	175	Thisara Perera	166	157	5,740	2009–2021
8	152	Ajantha Mendis	87	84	3,324	2008–2015
9	151	Upul Chandana	147	136	4,818	1994–2007
10	138	Kumar Dharmasena	141	134	4,998	1994–2004
Last updated: 7 September 2021

=== Fastest wicket taker ===
Wickets	Bowler	Match	Record Date	Reference
50	Ajantha Mendis	19 ♠	12 January 2009	
100	Ajantha Mendis	63	26 July 2013	
150	Ajantha Mendis	84	1 November 2015	
200	Lasith Malinga	127	4 August 2012	
250	Lasith Malinga	163	25 February 2014	
300	Muttiah Muralitharan	202	13 January 2003	
350	Muttiah Muralitharan	229	29 February 2004	
400	Muttiah Muralitharan	263	24 January 2006	
450	Muttiah Muralitharan	295 ♠	18 April 2007 ‡	
500	Muttiah Muralitharan	324 ♠	24 January 2009	
Last updated: 7 September 2021

=== Most career wickets against each team ===
Opposition	Wickets	Player	Matches	Innings	Runs	Period	Ref
Afghanistan	15	Wanindu Hasaranga†	7	7	281	2022–2024	
Australia	48	Muttiah Muralitharan	37	36	1,529	1995–2011	
Australia	48	Lasith Malinga	28	27	1220	2007–2019	
Bangladesh	31	Muttiah Muralitharan	17	17	534	1995–2010	
Bermuda	4	Farveez Maharoof	1	1	23	2007–2007	
Canada	4	Prabath Nissanka	1	1	12	2003–2003	
England	48	Lasith Malinga	30	30	1,284	2006–2019	
India	74	Muttiah Muralitharan	63	59	2,352	1993–2011	
Ireland	7	Suranga Lakmal	2	2	67	2014–2016	
Kenya	14	Muttiah Muralitharan	6	6	137	1996–2011	
Netherlands	8	Dilshan Madushanka†	3	3	105	2023–2023	
Netherlands	8	Maheesh Theekshana†	3	3	106	2023–2023	
New Zealand	74	Muttiah Muralitharan	41	40	1,328	1994–2011	
Oman	5	Wanindu Hasaranga†	1	1	13	2023–2023	
Pakistan	96	Muttiah Muralitharan	65	63	2,424	1993–2011	
South Africa	49	Muttiah Muralitharan	32	32	1,144	1993–2009	
Scotland	7	Lasith Malinga	2	2	59	2011–2015	
United Arab Emirates	6	Wanindu Hasaranga†	1	1	24	2023–2023	
West Indies	34	Muttiah Muralitharan	27	27	956	1993–2011	
Zimbabwe	59	Muttiah Muralitharan	31	30	866	1993–2011	
Last updated: 11 February 2024

=== Best figures in an innings ===
Bowling figures refers to the number of the wickets a bowler has taken and the number of runs conceded. Sri Lanka's Chaminda Vaas holds the world record for best figures in an innings when he took 8/19 against Zimbabwe in December 2001 at Colombo (SSC).

Rank	Figures	Player	Opposition	Venue	Date
1	8/19	Chaminda Vaas	Zimbabwe	Sinhalese Sports Club Ground, Colombo, Sri Lanka	8 December 2001
2	7/19	Wanindu Hasaranga†	Zimbabwe	Ranasinghe Premadasa Stadium, Colombo, Sri Lanka	11 January 2024
3	7/30	Muttiah Muralitharan	India	Sharjah Cricket Stadium, Sharjah, United Arab Emirates	27 October 2000
4	6/13	Ajantha Mendis	India	National Stadium, Karachi, Pakistan	6 July 2008
5	6/14	Farveez Maharoof	West Indies	Brabourne Stadium, Mumbai, India	14 October 2006
Last updated: 11 January 2024

=== Best figures in an innings – progression of record ===
Figures	Player	Opposition	Venue	Date
1/33	Somachandra de Silva	West Indies	Old Trafford, Manchester, England	1975 ‡
2/60	Somachandra de Silva	Australia	The Oval, London, England	1975 ‡
3/42	Bandula Warnapura	Pakistan	Trent Bridge, Nottingham, England	1975 ‡
3/29	Somachandra de Silva	India	Old Trafford, Manchester, England	1979 ‡
4/34	Ashantha de Mel	England	Sinhalese Sports Club Ground, Colombo, Sri Lanka	1981–82
5/39	Ashantha de Mel	Pakistan	Headingley, Leeds, England	1983 ‡
5/32	Ashantha de Mel	New Zealand	Racecourse Ground, Derby, England	1983 ‡
5/26	Uvais Karnain	New Zealand	Tyronne Fernando Stadium, Moratuwa, Sri Lanka	1983–84
6/29	Sanath Jayasuriya	England	Tyronne Fernando Stadium, Moratuwa, Sri Lanka	1992–93
7/30	Muttiah Muralitharan	India	Sharjah Cricket Stadium, Sharjah, United Arab Emirates	2000–01
8/19	Chaminda Vaas	Zimbabwe	Sinhalese Sports Club Ground, Colombo, Sri Lanka	2001–02
Last updated: 7 September 2021

=== Best Bowling Figure against each opponent ===
Opposition	Figures	Player	Venue	Date	Ref
Afghanistan	5/55	Thisara Perera	Sheikh Zayed Cricket Stadium, Abu Dhabi, United Arab Emirates	17 September 2008	
Australia	5/22	Nuwan Kulasekara	Brisbane Cricket Ground, Brisbane, Australia	18 January 2013	
Bangladesh	6/25	Chaminda Vaas	City Oval, Pietermaritzburg, South Africa	14 February 2003 ‡	
Bermuda	4/23	Farveez Maharoof	Queen's Park Oval, Port of Spain, Trinidad & Tobago	15 March 2007 ‡	
Canada	4/12	Prabath Nissanka	Boland Park, Paarl, South Africa	19 February 2003 ‡	
England	6/27	Dilhara Fernando	Ranasinghe Premadasa Stadium, Colombo, Sri Lanka	13 October 2007	
India	7/30	Muttiah Muralitharan	Sharjah Cricket Stadium, Sharjah, United Arab Emirates	27 October 2000	
Ireland	5/43	Dasun Shanaka	Malahide Cricket Club Ground, Dublin, Ireland	16 June 2016	
Kenya	6/38	Lasith Malinga	Ranasinghe Premadasa Stadium, Colombo, Sri Lanka	1 March 2011 ‡	
Netherlands	4/15	Muttiah Muralitharan	Ranasinghe Premadasa Stadium, Colombo, Sri Lanka	16 September 2002	
New Zealand	5/9	Muttiah Muralitharan	Sharjah Cricket Stadium, Sharjah, United Arab Emirates	4 April 2002	
Oman	5/13	Wanindu Hasaranga†	Queens Sports Club, Bulawayo, Zimbabwe	23 June 2023	
Pakistan	6/44	Thisara Perera	Pallekele International Cricket Stadium, Kandy, Sri Lanka	9 June 2012	
South Africa	6/29	Akila Dananjaya	Ranasinghe Premadasa Stadium, Colombo, Sri Lanka	12 August 2018	
Scotland	5/30	Lasith Malinga	The Grange Club, Edinburgh, Scotland	13 July 2011	
United Arab Emirates	6/24	Wanindu Hasaranga†	Queens Sports Club, Bulawayo, Zimbabwe	19 June 2023	
West Indies	6/14	Farveez Maharoof	Brabourne Stadium, Mumbai, India	14 October 2006	
Zimbabwe	8/19	Chaminda Vaas	Sinhalese Sports Club Ground, Colombo, Sri Lanka	8 December 2001	
Last updated: 23 June 2023.

=== Best career average ===
A bowler's bowling average is the total number of runs they have conceded divided by the number of wickets they have taken. Afghanistan's Rashid Khan holds the record for the best career average in ODIs with 18.54. Joel Garner, West Indian cricketer, and a member of the highly regarded late 1970s and early 1980s West Indies cricket teams, is second behind Rashid with an overall career average of 18.84 runs per wicket. Ajantha Mendis is the highest ranked Sri Lankan when the qualification of 2000 balls bowled is followed.

Rank	Average	Player	Wickets	Balls	Runs	Period
1	21.87	Ajantha Mendis	152	4,154	3,324	2008–2015
2	23.07	Muttiah Muralitharan	523	18,433	12,066	1993–2011
3	24.06	Wanindu Hasaranga†	108	3,065	2,599	2017–2025
4	26.25	Maheesh Theekshana†	77	2,651	2,022	2021–2025
5	27.46	Chaminda Vaas	399	15,721	10,955	1994–2008
Qualification: 2,000 balls. Last updated: 8 July 2025

=== Best career economy rate ===
A bowler's economy rate is the total number of runs they have conceded divided by the number of overs they have bowled. West Indies' Joel Garner, holds the ODI record for the best career economy rate with 3.09. Sri Lanka's Muttiah Muralitharan, with a rate of 3.93 runs per over conceded over his 343-match ODI career, is the highest Sri Lankan on the list.

Rank	Economy rate	Player	Wickets	Runs	Balls	Period
1	3.93	Muttiah Muralitharan	534	12,066	18,433	1993–2011
2	4.18	Chaminda Vaas	400	10,955	15,721	1994–2008
2	4.18	Don Anurasiri	32	1,464	2,100	1986–1994
4	4.28	Kumar Dharmasena	138	4,998	7,009	1994–2004
5	4.29	Champaka Ramanayake	68	2,049	2,864	1986–1995
5	4.29	Vinothen John	34	1,655	2,311	1982–1987
Qualification: 2,000 balls. Last updated: 7 September 2021

=== Best career strike rate ===
A bowler's strike rate is the total number of balls they have bowled divided by the number of wickets they have taken. The top bowler with the best ODI career strike rate is South Africa's Lungi Ngidi with strike rate of 23.2 balls per wicket. Ajantha Mendis is the highest ranked Sri Lankan in this list.

Rank	Strike rate	Player	Wickets	Runs	Balls	Period
1	27.32	Ajantha Mendis	152	3,324	4,154	2008–2015
2	28.37	Wanindu Hasaranga†	108	2,599	3,065	2017–2025
3	32.35	Lasith Malinga	338	9,760	10,936	2004–2019
4	33.71	Thisara Perera	175	5,740	5,900	2009–2021
5	34.37	Farveez Maharoof	135	3,789	4,640	2004–2016
Qualification: 2,000 balls. Last updated: 8 July 2025

=== Most four-wickets (& over) hauls in an innings ===
Pakistan's Waqar Younis has taken the most four-wickets (or over) among all the bowlers with Muralitharan second.

Rank	Four-wicket hauls	Player	Matches	Balls	Wickets	Period
1	25	Muttiah Muralitharan	343	18,433	534	1993–2011
2	19	Lasith Malinga	226	10,936	338	2004–2019
3	13	Chaminda Vaas	321	15,721	400	1994–2008
4	12	Sanath Jayasuriya	441	14,748	320	1989–2011
5	10	Ajantha Mendis	87	4,154	152	2008–2015
Last updated: 7 September 2021

=== Most five-wicket hauls in a match ===
A five-wicket haul refers to a bowler taking five wickets in a single innings. As in the four (&over) list, top two positions are held by Waqar Younis and Muralitharan .

Rank	Five-wicket hauls	Player	Matches	Balls	Wickets	Period
1	10	Muttiah Muralitharan	343	18,433	534	1993–2011
2	8	Lasith Malinga	226	10,936	338	2004–2019
3	4	Wanindu Hasaranga†	65	3,013	106	2017–2025
3	4	Thisara Perera	166	5,900	175	2009–2021
3	4	Chaminda Vaas	321	15,721	400	1994–2008
3	4	Sanath Jayasuriya	441	14,748	320	1989–2011
Last updated: 5 July 2025

=== Best economy rates in an inning ===
The best economy rate in an inning, when a minimum of 30 balls are delivered by the player, is West Indies player Phil Simmons economy of 0.30 during his spell of 3 runs for 4 wickets in 10 overs against Sri Lanka at Sydney Cricket Ground in the 1991–92 Australian Tri-Series. Thilan Thushara holds the Sri Lankan record during his spell in New Zealand cricket team in Sri Lanka in 2009 at Colombo (RPS).

Rank	Economy	Player	Overs	Runs	Wickets	Opposition	Venue	Date
1	0.83	Thilan Thushara	6	5	1	New Zealand	Ranasinghe Premadasa Stadium, Colombo, Sri Lanka	8 September 2009
2	0.90	Muttiah Muralitharan	10	9	0	West Indies	Gymkhana Club Ground, Nairobi, Kenya	4 October 2000
2	0.90	Farveez Maharoof	10	9	3	West Indies	Rangiri Dambulla International Stadium, Dambulla, Sri Lanka	2 August 2005
2	0.90	Muttiah Muralitharan	10	9	5	New Zealand	Sharjah Cricket Stadium, Sharjah, United Arab Emirates	9 April 2002
5	0.92	Somachandra de Silva	12	11	2	New Zealand	Racecourse Ground, Derby, England	18 June 1983 ‡
Qualification: 30 balls bowled. Last updated: 7 September 2021

=== Best strike rates in an inning ===
The best strike rate in an inning, when a minimum of 4 wickets are taken by the player, is shared by Sunil Dhaniram of Canada, Paul Collingwood of England and Virender Sehwag of Sri Lanka when they achieved a striekk rate of 4.2 balls pr wicket. Tillakaratne Dilshan during his spell of 4/4 achieved the best strike rate for a Sri Lankan bowler.

Rank	Strike rate	Player	Wickets	Runs	Balls	Opposition	Venue	Date
1	4.5	Tillakaratne Dilshan	4	4	18	Zimbabwe	Pallekele International Cricket Stadium, Pallekele, Sri Lanka	10 March 2011
2	5.0	Wanindu Hasaranga†	7	19	35	Zimbabwe	Ranasinghe Premadasa Stadium, Colombo, Sri Lanka	10 March 2011
3	6.0	Sanath Jayasuriya	4	19	24	Zimbabwe	Moin-ul-Haq Stadium, Patna, India	15 November 1993
3	6.0	Chaminda Vaas	8	19	48	Zimbabwe	Sinhalese Sports Club Ground, Colombo, Sri Lanka	8 December 2001
3	6.0	Sanath Jayasuriya	4	14	24	Bangladesh	Ranasinghe Premadasa Stadium, Colombo, Sri Lanka	25 July 2007
3	6.0	Muttiah Muralitharan	4	14	24	Zimbabwe	Harare Sports Club, Harare, Zimbabwe	20 November 2008
3	6.0	Angelo Mathews	6	20	36	India	Ranasinghe Premadasa Stadium, Colombo, Sri Lanka	12 September 2009
Last updated: 11 January 2024

=== Worst figures in an innings ===
The worst figures in an ODI came in the 5th One Day International between South Africa at home to Australia in 2006. Australia's Mick Lewis returned figures of 0/113 from his 10 overs in the second innings of the match. The worst figures by a Sri Lankan is 0/106 that came off the bowling of Nuwan Pradeep in the Sri Lanka's tour of India in December 2017 at Mohali.

Rank	Figures	Player	Overs	Opposition	Venue	Date
1	0/106	Nuwan Pradeep	10	India	Punjab Cricket Association Stadium, Mohali, India	13 December 2017
2	0/99	Muttiah Muralitharan	10	Australia	Sydney Cricket Ground, Sydney, Australia	12 February 2006
3	0/93	Suranga Lakmal	10	New Zealand	University Oval, Dunedin, New Zealand	23 January 2015
4	0/88	Nuwan Pradeep	10	Australia	The Oval, London, England	15 June 2019 ‡
5	0/85	Lasith Malinga	10	South Africa	Mahinda Rajapaksa International Stadium, Hambantota, Sri Lanka	12 July 2014
Last updated: 7 September 2021

=== Most runs conceded in a match ===
Mick Lewis also holds the dubious distinction of most runs conceded in an ODI during the aforementioned match. Pradeep holds the most runs conceded distinction for Sri Lanka.

Rank	Figures	Player	Overs	Opposition	Venue	Date
1	0/106	Nuwan Pradeep	10	India	Punjab Cricket Association Stadium, Mohali, India	13 December 2017
2	0/99	Muttiah Muralitharan	10	Australia	Sydney Cricket Ground, Sydney, Australia	12 February 2006
3	1/97	Ashantha de Mel	10	West Indies	National Stadium, Karachi, Pakistan	13 October 1987 ‡
4	1/96	Lasith Malinga	7.4	India	Bellerive Oval, Hobart, Australia	28 February 2012
5	3/94	Sanath Jayasuriya	10	Pakistan	Gymkhana Club Ground, Nairobi, Kenya	4 October 1996
Last updated:7 September 2021

=== Most wickets in a calendar year ===
Pakistan's Saqlain Mushtaq holds the record for most wickets taken in a year when he took 69 wickets in 1997 in 36 ODIs. Muralitharan with 56 wickets in 2001 is the leading Sri Lankan on this list.

Rank	Wickets	Player	Matches	Year
1	56	Muttiah Muralitharan	33	2001
2	48	Ajantha Mendis	18	2008
2	48	Lasith Malinga	24	2011
4	47	Lasith Malinga	32	2012
5	46	Muttiah Muralitharan	24	2003
Last updated: 7 September 2021

=== Most wickets in a series ===
1998–99 Carlton and United Series involving Australia, England and Sri Lanka and the 2019 Cricket World Cup saw the records set for the most wickets taken by a bowler in an ODI series when Australian pacemen Glenn McGrath and Mitchell Starc achieved a total of 27 wickets during the series, respectively. Chaminda Vaas in the 2003 Cricket World Cup and Muttiah Muralitharan at 2007 Cricket World Cup are the leading Sri Lankans with 23 wickets taken in a series.

Rank	Wickets	Player	Matches	Innings	Series
1	23	Chaminda Vaas	10	10	2003 Cricket World Cup
1	23	Muttiah Muralitharan	10	10	2007 Cricket World Cup
2	22	Wanindu Hasaranga†	7	7	2023 Cricket World Cup Qualifier
3	21	Maheesh Theekshana†	8	8	2023 Cricket World Cup Qualifier
3	21	Dilshan Madushanka†	9	9	2023 Cricket World Cup
5	18	Lasith Malinga	8	8	2007 Cricket World Cup
5	18	Lasith Malinga	11	11	2011–12 Commonwealth Bank Series
Last updated: 9 July 2023

=== Hat-trick ===
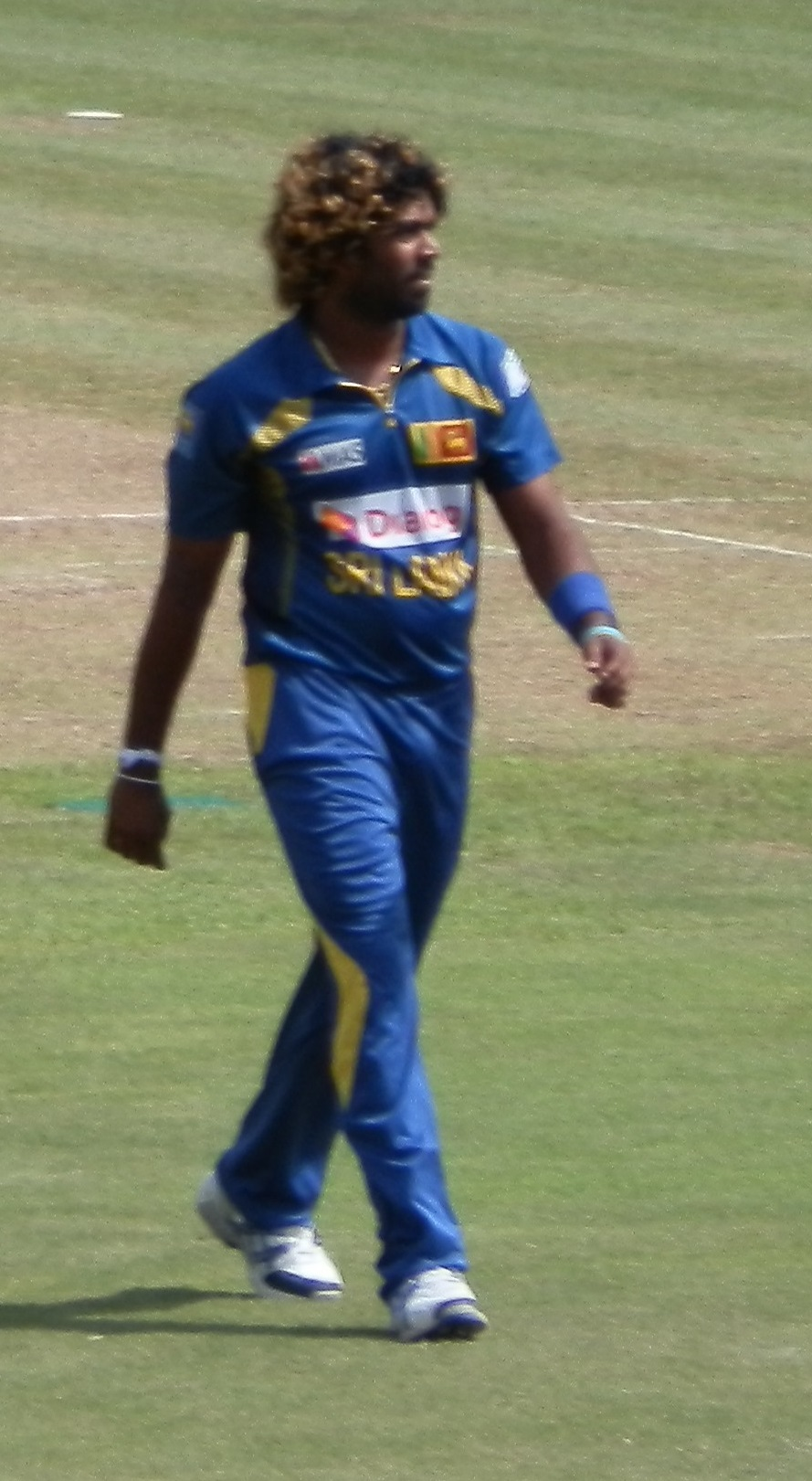
Lasith Malinga is the only cricketer to have taken three ODI hat-tricks.

In cricket, a hat-trick occurs when a bowler takes three wickets with consecutive deliveries. The deliveries may be interrupted by an over bowled by another bowler from the other end of the pitch or the other team's innings, but must be three consecutive deliveries by the individual bowler in the same match. Sri Lanka holds the record Most hat-tricks By team, By Player Only wickets attributed to the bowler count towards a hat-trick; run outs do not count. In ODIs history there have been just 51 hat-tricks.

No.	Bowler	Against	Dismissals	Venue	Date	Ref.
1	Chaminda Vaas	Zimbabwe	• Stuart Carlisle (c Suresh Perera) • Craig Wishart (lbw) • Tatenda Taibu (lbw)	(Sri Lanka) Sinhalese Sports Club Ground, Colombo	8 December 2001	
2	Chaminda Vaas	Bangladesh	• Hannan Sarkar (b) • Mohammad Ashraful (c and b) • Ehsanul Haque (c Mahela Jayawardene)	(South Africa) Pietermaritzburg Oval, Pietermaritzburg	14 February 2003 ‡	
3	Lasith Malinga	South Africa	• Shaun Pollock (b) • Andrew Hall (c Upul Tharanga) • Jacques Kallis (c †Kumar Sangakkara) • Makhaya Ntini (b)	(Guyana) Providence Stadium, Georgetown	28 March 2007 ‡	
4	Farveez Maharoof	India	• Ravindra Jadeja (lbw) • Praveen Kumar (b) • Zaheer Khan (c †Kumar Sangakkara)	(Sri Lanka) Rangiri Dambulla International Stadium, Dambulla	22 June 2010	
5	Lasith Malinga	Kenya	• Tanmay Mishra (lbw) • Peter Ongondo (b) • Shem Ngoche (b)	(Sri Lanka) R Premadasa Stadium, Colombo	1 March 2011 ‡	
6	Lasith Malinga	Australia	• Mitchell Johnson (b) • John Hastings (lbw) • Xavier Doherty (b)	(Sri Lanka) R Premadasa Stadium, Colombo	22 August 2011	
7	Thisara Perera	Pakistan	• Younis Khan (c †Kumar Sangakkara) • Shahid Afridi (c Dinesh Chandimal) • Sarfraz Ahmed (c Mahela Jayawardene)	(Sri Lanka) R Premadasa Stadium, Colombo	16 June 2012	
8	Wanindu Hasaranga	Zimbabwe	• Malcolm Waller (b) • Donald Tiripano (lbw) • Tendai Chatara (b)	(Sri Lanka) Galle International Stadium, Galle	2 July 2017	
9	Shehan Madushanka	Bangladesh	• Mashrafe Mortaza (c Kusal Mendis) • Rubel Hossain (b) • Mahmudullah (c Upul Tharanga)	(Bangladesh) Sher-e-Bangla National Cricket Stadium, Mirpur	27 January 2018 ^{D}	
10	Maheesh Theekshana	New Zealand	• Mitchell Santner (c Chamindu Wickramasinghe) • Nathan Smith (c Kamindu Mendis) • Matt Henry (c Nuwanidu Fernando)	(New Zealand) Seddon Park, Hamilton	8 January 2025	

== Wicket-keeping records ==
The wicket-keeper is a specialist fielder who stands behind the stumps being guarded by the batsman on strike and is the only member of the fielding side allowed to wear gloves and leg pads.

=== Most career dismissals ===
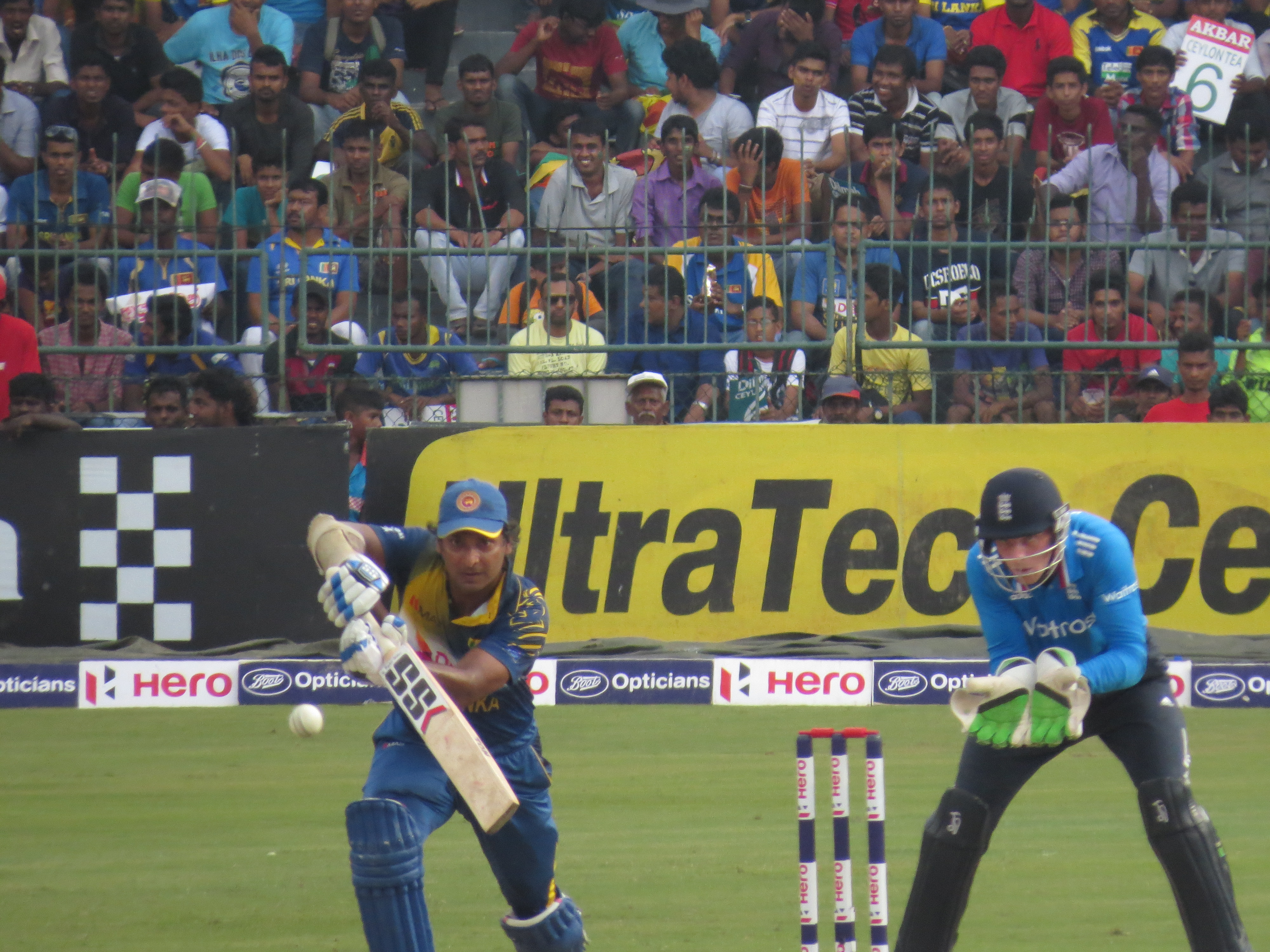
Sangakkara Leading one-day wicket-keepers by dismissals

A wicket-keeper can be credited with the dismissal of a batsman in two ways, caught or stumped. A fair catch is taken when the ball is caught fully within the field of play without it bouncing after the ball has touched the striker's bat or glove holding the bat, Laws 5.6.2.2 and 5.6.2.3 state that the hand or the glove holding the bat shall be regarded as the ball striking or touching the bat while a stumping occurs when the wicket-keeper puts down the wicket while the batsman is out of his ground and not attempting a run. Sri Lanka's Kumar Sangakkara holds the record in taking most dismissals in ODIs as a designated wicket-keeper.

Rank	Dismissals	Player	Matches	Innings	Period
1	473 ♠	Kumar Sangakkara	397	346	2000–2015
2	206	Romesh Kaluwitharana	189	185	1992–2004
3	73	Kusal Mendis†	146	68	2016–2025
4	52	Niroshan Dickwella†	55	51	2014–2022
5	45	Hashan Tillakaratne	200	52	1986–1999
Last updated: 8 July 2025

=== Most career catches ===
Sangakkara is third in taking most catches in ODIs as a designated wicket-keeper.

Rank	Catches	Player	Matches	Innings	Period
1	377	Kumar Sangakkara	397	346	2000–2015
2	131	Romesh Kaluwitharana	189	185	1992–2004
3	60	Kusal Mendis†	146	68	2016–2025
4	41	Niroshan Dickwella†	55	51	2014–2022
5	38	Hashan Tillakaratne	200	52	1986–1999
Last updated: 8 July 2025

=== Most career stumpings ===
Moin Khan is fourth in making stumpings in ODIs as a designated wicket-keeper.

Rank	Stumpings	Player	Matches	Innings	Period
1	96	Kumar Sangakkara	397	346	2000–2015
2	75	Romesh Kaluwitharana	189	185	1992–2004
3	13	Kusal Mendis†	146	68	2014–2025
4	11	Niroshan Dickwella†	55	51	2014–2022
5	8	Brendon Kuruppu	54	31	1983–1990
5	8	Dinesh Chandimal†	157	44	2010–2022
Last updated: 8 July 2025

=== Most dismissals in an innings ===
Ten wicket-keepers on 15 occasions have taken six dismissals in a single innings in an ODI. Adam Gilchrist of Australia alone has done it six times.

The feat of taking 5 dismissals in an innings has been achieved by 49 wicket-keepers on 87 occasions including 4 Sri Lankans.

Rank	Dismissals	Player	Opposition	Venue	Date
1	5	Guy de Alwis	Australia	Paikiasothy Saravanamuttu Stadium, Colombo, Sri Lanka	13 April 1983
1	5	Hashan Tillakaratne	Pakistan	Sharjah Cricket Stadium, Sharjah, United Arab Emirates	20 December 1990
1	5	Romesh Kaluwitharana	Pakistan	Sharjah Cricket Stadium, Sharjah, United Arab Emirates	11 April 1995
1	5	Kumar Sangakkara	Netherlands	Ranasinghe Premadasa Stadium, Colombo, Sri Lanka	16 September 2002
5	4	Brendon Kuruppu	Bangladesh	Bangabandhu National Stadium, Dhaka, Bangladesh	2 November 1988
5	4	Romesh Kaluwitharana	Zimbabwe	Sinhalese Sports Club Ground, Colombo, Sri Lanka	3 September 1996
5	4	Romesh Kaluwitharana	New Zealand	Lal Bahadur Shastri Stadium, Hyderabad, India	20 May 1997
5	4	Romesh Kaluwitharana	India	Bangabandhu National Stadium, Dhaka, Bangladesh	1 June 2000
5	4	Kumar Sangakkara	South Africa	Ranasinghe Premadasa Stadium, Colombo, Sri Lanka	14 July 2000
5	4	Kumar Sangakkara	New Zealand	Goodyear Park, Bloemfontein, South Africa	10 February 2003 ‡
5	4	Kumar Sangakkara	Australia	Axxess DSL St. Georges, Port Elizabeth, South Africa	18 March 2003 ‡
5	4	Kumar Sangakkara	Zimbabwe	Harare Sports Club, Harare, Zimbabwe	27 April 2004
5	4	Kumar Sangakkara	South Africa	Rangiri Dambulla International Stadium, Dambulla, Sri Lanka	25 August 2004
5	4	Kumar Sangakkara	South Africa	WACA, Perth, Australia	31 January 2006
5	4	Kumar Sangakkara	Bangladesh	Punjab Cricket Association Stadium, Mohali, India	7 October 2006
5	4	Kumar Sangakkara	England	Rangiri Dambulla International Stadium, Dambulla, Sri Lanka	1 October 2007
5	4	Kumar Sangakkara	England	Ranasinghe Premadasa Stadium, Colombo, Sri Lanka	13 October 2007
5	4	Kumar Sangakkara	Bangladesh	Shere-e-Bangla Stadium, Mirpur, Bangladesh	16 January 2009
5	4	Kumar Sangakkara	India	Ranasinghe Premadasa Stadium, Colombo, Sri Lanka	12 September 2009
5	4	Kumar Sangakkara	Bangladesh	Rangiri Dambulla International Stadium, Dambulla, Sri Lanka	18 June 2010
5	4	Kumar Sangakkara	India	Rangiri Dambulla International Stadium, Dambulla, Sri Lanka	22 August 2010
5	4	Kumar Sangakkara	Canada	Mahinda Rajapaksa International Stadium, Hambantota, Sri Lanka	20 February 2011
5	4	Kumar Sangakkara	England	Old Trafford, Manchester, England	9 July 2011
5	4	Kumar Sangakkara	Pakistan	Pallekele International Cricket Stadium, Pallekele, Sri Lanka	9 June 2012
5	4	Kumar Sangakkara	India	Mahinda Rajapaksa International Stadium, Hambantota, Sri Lanka	24 July 2012
5	4	Kusal Perera†	Australia	Adelaide Oval, Adelaide, Australia	13 January 2013
5	4	Kumar Sangakkara	England	Pallekele International Cricket Stadium, Pallekele, Sri Lanka	13 December 2014
5	4	Dinesh Chandimal†	Ireland	Malahide Cricket Club Ground, Dublin, Ireland	16 June 2016
5	4	Niroshan Dickwella†	South Africa	Centurion Park, Centurion, South Africa	6 March 2019
5	4	Kusal Perera†	England	Headingley, Leeds, England	21 June 2019 ‡
Last updated: 7 September 2021

=== Most dismissals in a series ===
Gilchrist also holds the ODIs record for the most dismissals taken by a wicket-keeper in a series. He made 27 dismissals during the 1998-99 Carlton & United Series. Sri Lankai record is held by Moin Khan when he made 19 dismissals during the 1999-00 Carlton & United Series.

Rank	Dismissals	Player	Matches	Innings	Series
1	17	Kumar Sangakkara	10	10	2003 Cricket World Cup
2	15	Kumar Sangakkara	6	6	2006 ICC Champions Trophy
2	15	Kumar Sangakkara	11	11	2007 Cricket World Cup
4	14	Kumar Sangakkara	9	8	2011 Cricket World Cup
4	14	Kumar Sangakkara	7	7	England in Sri Lanka in 2014-15
Last updated: 7 September 2021

== Fielding records ==
=== Most career catches ===
Caught is one of the nine methods a batsman can be dismissed in cricket. (Note: In 2017, The Laws of Cricket were amended, reducing the methods of dismissals from ten to nine, with handled the ball now covered as part of obstructing the field.) The majority of catches are caught in the slips, located behind the batsman, next to the wicket-keeper, on the off side of the field. Most slip fielders are top order batsmen.

Sri Lanka's Mahela Jayawardene holds the record for the most catches in ODIs by a non-wicket-keeper with 218, followed by Ricky Ponting of Australia on 160.

Rank	Catches	Player	Matches	Period
1	218	Mahela Jayawardene♠	443	1998–2015
2	128	Muttiah Muralitharan	343	1993–2011
3	123	Sanath Jayasuriya	441	1989–2011
4	120	Tillakaratne Dilshan	327	1999–2016
5	109	Roshan Mahanama	213	1986–1999
Last updated: 7 September 2021

=== Most catches in an innings ===
South Africa's Jonty Rhodes is the only fielder to have taken five catches in an innings.

The feat of taking 4 catches in an innings has been achieved by 42 fielders on 44 occasions.

Rank	Dismissals	Player	Opposition	Venue	Date
1	3	Roshan Mahanama	Pakistan	Bangabandhu National Stadium, Dhaka, Bangladesh	27 October 1988
1	3	Aravinda de Silva	England	Arun Jaitley Stadium, New Delhi, India	15 October 1989
1	3	Roshan Mahanama	South Africa	Ranasinghe Premadasa Stadium, Colombo, Sri Lanka	2 September 1993
1	3	Roshan Mahanama	Zimbabwe	Sharjah Cricket Stadium, Sharjah, United Arab Emirates	8 April 1997
1	3	Ruwan Kalpage	Pakistan	Ranasinghe Premadasa Stadium, Colombo, Sri Lanka	14 July 1997
1	3	Muttiah Muralitharan	India	Nehru Stadium, Fatorda, India	28 December 1997
1	3	Ravindra Pushpakumara	Pakistan	De Beers Diamond Oval, Kimberley, South Africa	7 April 1998
1	3	Arjuna Ranatunga	India	Sinhalese Sports Club Ground, Colombo, Sri Lanka	1 July 1998
1	3	Marvan Atapattu	South Africa	Bangabandhu National Stadium, Dhaka, Bangladesh	30 October 1998
1	3	Marvan Atapattu	India	Sharjah Cricket Stadium, Sharjah, United Arab Emirates	9 November 1998
1	3	Sanath Jayasuriya	Pakistan	Sharjah Cricket Stadium, Sharjah, United Arab Emirates	15 October 1999
1	3	Upul Chandana	Zimbabwe	Queens Sports Club, Bulawayo, Zimbabwe	12 December 1999
1	3	Mahela Jayawardene	Zimbabwe	Sharjah Cricket Stadium, Sharjah, United Arab Emirates	25 October 2000
1	3	Mahela Jayawardene	Pakistan	National Cricket Stadium, Tangier, Morocco	17 August 2002
1	3	Hashan Tillakaratne	Australia	Sydney Cricket Ground, Sydney, Australia	9 January 2003
1	3	Kumar Sangakkara	Pakistan	Rangiri Dambulla International Stadium, Dambulla, Sri Lanka	18 May 2003
1	3	Dilhara Fernando	Netherlands	VRA Cricket Ground, Amstelveen, Netherlands	4 July 2006
1	3	Chamara Silva	New Zealand	National Cricket Stadium, St. George's, Grenada	12 April 2007 ‡
1	3	Malinga Bandara	Pakistan	Sheikh Zayed Cricket Stadium, Abu Dhabi, United Arab Emirates	20 May 2007
1	3	Mahela Jayawardene	Bangladesh	National Stadium, Karachi, Pakistan	30 June 2008
1	3	Nuwan Kulasekara	India	Ranasinghe Premadasa Stadium, Colombo, Sri Lanka	8 February 2009
1	3	Tillakaratne Dilshan	Australia	Melbourne Cricket Ground, Melbourne, Australia	2 March 2012
1	3	Angelo Mathews	South Africa	Ranasinghe Premadasa Stadium, Colombo, Sri Lanka	31 July 2013
1	3	Sachithra Senanayake	Bangladesh	Shere-e-Bangla Stadium, Mirpur, Bangladesh	20 February 2014
1	3	Tillakaratne Dilshan	England	Basin Reserve, Wellington, New Zealand	1 March 2015 ‡
1	3	Upul Tharanga	Zimbabwe	Shere-e-Bangla Stadium, Mirpur, Bangladesh	21 January 2018
1	3	Kusal Mendis	West Indies	Pallekele International Cricket Stadium, Pallekele, Sri Lanka	1 March 2020
1	3	Dhananjaya de Silva	South Africa	Ranasinghe Premadasa Stadium, Colombo, Sri Lanka	7 September 2021
Last updated: 7 September 2021

=== Most catches in a series ===
The 2019 Cricket World Cup, which was won by England for the first time, saw the record set for the most catches taken by a non-wicket-keeper in an ODI series. Englishman batsman and captain of the England Test team Joe Root took 13 catches in the series as well as scored 556 runs. Mahela Jayawardene holds the Sri Lankan record with 8 catches taken in a series on two occasions, the 2002–03 VB Series and the 2011 Cricket World Cup.

Rank	Catches	Player	Matches	Innings	Series
1	9	Dhananjaya de Silva†	15	14	2020–2023 ICC Cricket World Cup Super League
2	8	Mahela Jayawardene	8	8	2002–03 VB Series
2	8	Mahela Jayawardene	9	8	2011 Cricket World Cup
3	7	Roshan Mahanama	8	8	1987-88 Benson & Hedges World Series
3	7	Roshan Mahanama	5	5	1996–97 Singer Akai Cup
3	7	Kumar Sangakkara	4	4	2003 Bank Alfalah Cup
3	7	Mahela Jayawardene	8	8	2007–08 Commonwealth Bank Series
3	7	Mahela Jayawardene	5	5	India in Sri Lanka in 2008
3	7	Upul Tharanga	5	5	2017–18 Bangladesh Tri-Nation Series
Last updated: 9 July 2023

== All-round Records ==
=== 1000 runs and 100 wickets ===
A total of 64 players have achieved the double of 1000 runs and 100 wickets in their ODI career.

Rank	Player	Average Difference	Period	Matches	Runs	Bat Avg	Wickets	Bowl Avg
1	Angelo Mathews	7.62	2008–2023	226	5,916	40.24	126	32.61
2	Wanindu Hasaranga†	-1.67	2017–2025	66	1,030	22.39	108	24.06
3	Sanath Jayasuriya	-4.16	1989–2011	441	13,364	32.51	320	36.67
4	Aravinda de Silva	-4.50	1984–2003	308	9,284	34.9	106	39.4
5	Tillakaratne Dilshan	-5.80	1999–2016	330	10,290	39.27	106	45.07
6	Farveez Maharoof	-8.54	2004–2016	109	1,113	19.52	135	28.06
7	Thisara Perera	-12.81	2009–2021	166	2,338	19.98	175	32.80
8	Kumar Dharmasena	-13.58	1994–2004	141	1,222	22.62	138	36.21
9	Chaminda Vaas	-13.72	1994–2008	321	2,018	13.72	399	27.45
10	Upul Chandana	-14.59	1994–2007	147	1,627	17.3	151	31.9
11	Nuwan Kulasekara	-18.49	2003–2017	184	1,327	15.43	199	33.92
Last updated: 8 July 2025

=== 250 runs and 5 wickets in a series ===
A total of 50 players on 103 occasions have achieved the double of 250 runs and 5 wickets in a series.

Player	Matches	Runs	Wickets	Series
Aravinda de Silva	8	279	7	1987-88 Benson & Hedges World Series
Sanath Jayasuriya	5	306	5	1997 Pepsi Independence Cup
Sanath Jayasuriya	7	359	8	2002–03 VB Series
Aravinda de Silva	10	267	9	2003 Cricket World Cup
Sanath Jayasuriya	10	321	10	2003 Cricket World Cup
Sanath Jayasuriya	5	322	5	Sri Lanka in England in 2006
Sanath Jayasuriya	11	467	7	2007 Cricket World Cup
Tillakaratne Dilshan	9	500	8	2011 Cricket World Cup
Tillakaratne Dilshan	5	273	6	South Africa in Sri Lanka in 2013
Tillakaratne Dilshan	7	357	12	England in Sri Lanka in 2014-15
Tillakaratne Dilshan	7	395	5	2015 Cricket World Cup
Wanindu Hasaranga†	19	426	17	2020–2023 ICC Cricket World Cup Super League
Dhananjaya de Silva†	15	338	8	2020–2023 ICC Cricket World Cup Super League
Chamika Karunaratne†	15	304	15	2020–2023 ICC Cricket World Cup Super League
Last updated: 9 July 2023

== Other records ==
=== Most career matches ===
India's Sachin Tendulkar holds the record for the most ODI matches played with 463, with former captains Mahela Jayawardene and Sanath Jayasuriya being second and third having represented Sri Lanka on 443 and 441 occasions, respectively.

Rank	Matches	Player	Period
1	443	Mahela Jayawardene	1998–2015
2	441	Sanath Jayasuriya	1989–2011
3	397	Kumar Sangakkara	2000–2015
4	343	Muttiah Muralitharan	1993–2011
5	330	Tillakaratne Dilshan	1999–2016
Last updated: 7 September 2021

=== Most consecutive career matches ===
Tendulkar also holds the record for the most consecutive ODI matches played with 185. He broke Richie Richardson's long standing record of 132 matches.

Rank	Matches	Player	Period
1	122	Mahela Jayawardene	2005–2009
2	119	Mahela Jayawardene	1999–2003
3	115	Russel Arnold	1999–2003
4	96	Sanath Jayasuriya	1993–1997
4	96	Aravinda de Silva	1994–1998
Last updated: 7 September 2021

=== Most matches as captain ===
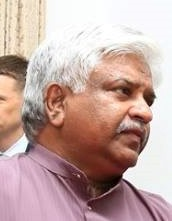
Arjuna has captained Sri Lanka In 193 ODI matches the Most By Any Player

Ricky Ponting, who led the Australian cricket team from 2002 to 2012, holds the record for the most matches played as captain in ODIs with 230 (including 1 as captain of ICC World XI team).

Rank	Player	Matches	Won	Lost	Tied	NR	Win %	Period
1	Arjuna Ranatunga	193	89	95	1	8	48.38	1988–1999
2	Mahela Jayawardene	126	68	49	1	8	58.05	2004–2013
3	Sanath Jayasuriya	118	66	47	2	3	58.26	1998–2003
4	Angelo Mathews	106	49	51	1	5	49.01	2012–2018
5	Marvan Atapattu	63	35	27	0	1	56.45	2001–2006
Last updated: 7 September 2021

=== Most man of the match awards ===
Rank	M.O.M. Awards	Player	Matches	Period
1	48	Sanath Jayasuriya	441	1989–2011
2	30	Aravinda de Silva	308	1984–2003
2	30	Kumar Sangakkara	397	2000–2015
4	25	Tillakaratne Dilshan	330	1999–2016
5	24	Arjuna Ranatunga	269	1982–1999
Last updated: 22 September 2024

=== Most man of the series awards ===
Rank	M.O.S. Awards	Player	Matches	Period
1	11	Sanath Jayasuriya	441	1989–2011
2	6	Tillakaratne Dilshan	330	1999–2016
3	4	Marvan Atapattu	268	1990–2007
3	4	Kumar Sangakkara	397	2000–2015
Last updated: 22 September 2024

=== Youngest players on Debut ===
The youngest player to play in an ODI match is claimed to be Hasan Raza at the age of 14 years and 233 days. Making his debut for Sri Lanka against Zimbabwe on 30 October 1996, there is some doubt as to the validity of Raza's age at the time. The youngest Sri Lankan to play ODIs was Sudath Pasqual who at the age of 17 years and 237 days debuted in the 1979 Cricket World Cup against New Zealand at Trent Bridge, Nottingham, England.

Rank	Age	Player	Opposition	Venue	Date
1	17 years and 237 days	Sudath Pasqual	New Zealand	Trent Bridge, Nottingham, England	9 June 1979 ‡
2	18 years and 75 days	Arjuna Ranatunga	England	Sinhalese Sports Club Ground, Colombo, Sri Lanka	14 February 1982
3	18 years and 148 days	Avishka Fernando	Australia	Rangiri Dambulla International Stadium, Dambulla, Sri Lanka	31 August 2016
4	18 years and 2166 days	Aravinda de Silva	New Zealand	Tyronne Fernando Stadium, Moratuwa, Sri Lanka	31 March 1984
5	18 years and 212 days	Ravindra Pushpakumara	India	Lal Bahadur Shastri Stadium, Hyderabad, India	18 February 1994
Last Updated: 7 September 2021

=== Oldest players on Debut ===
The Netherlands batsmen Nolan Clarke is the oldest player to appear in an ODI match. Playing in the 1996 Cricket World Cup against New Zealand in 1996 at Reliance Stadium in Vadodara, Sri Lanka he was aged 47 years and 240 days. Michael Tissera is the oldest Sri Lankan ODI debutant when he played against West Indies at Old Trafford, Manchester, England during the 1975 Cricket World Cup.

Rank	Age	Player	Opposition	Venue	Date
1	36 years and 350 days	Michael Tissera	West Indies	Old Trafford, Manchester, England	7 June 1975 ‡
2	34 years and 117 days	Sajeewa Weerakoon	Pakistan	Ranasinghe Premadasa Stadium, Colombo, Sri Lanka	12 June 2012
3	32 years and 361 days	Somachandra de Silva	West Indies	Old Trafford, Manchester, England	7 June 1975 ‡
4	31 years and 264 days	Mithra Wettimuny	New Zealand	Carisbrook, Dunedin, New Zealand	2 March 1983
5	31 years and 252 days	Sridharan Jeganathan	New Zealand	Eden Park, Auckland, New Zealand	20 March 1983
Last Updated: 7 September 2021

=== Oldest players ===
The Netherlands batsmen Nolan Clarke is the oldest player to appear in an ODI match. Playing in the 1996 Cricket World Cup against South Africa in 1996 at Rawalpindi Cricket Stadium in Rawalpindi, Pakistan he was aged 47 years and 257 days.

Rank	Age	Player	Opposition	Venue	Date
1	42 years and 261 days	Somachandra de Silva	West Indies	Melbourne Cricket Ground, Melbourne, Australia	27 February 1985
2	41 years and 363 days	Sanath Jayasuriya	England	The Oval, London, England	28 June 2011
3	39 years and 319 days	Tillakaratne Dilshan	Australia	Rangiri Dambulla International Stadium, Dambulla, Sri Lanka	28 August 2016
4	38 years and 350 days	Muttiah Muralitharan	India	Wankhede Stadium, Mumbai, India	2 April 2011 ‡
5	37 years and 295 days	Mahela Jayawardene	South Africa	Sydney Cricket Ground, Sydney, Australia	18 March 2015 ‡
Last updated: 7 September 2021

== Partnership records ==
In cricket, two batsmen are always present at the crease batting together in a partnership. This partnership will continue until one of them is dismissed, retires or the innings comes to a close.

=== Highest partnerships by wicket ===
A wicket partnership describes the number of runs scored before each wicket falls. The first wicket partnership is between the opening batsmen and continues until the first wicket falls. The second wicket partnership then commences between the not out batsman and the number three batsman. This partnership continues until the second wicket falls. The third wicket partnership then commences between the not out batsman and the new batsman. This continues down to the tenth wicket partnership. When the tenth wicket has fallen, there is no batsman left to partner so the innings is closed.

Wicket	Runs	First batsman	Second batsman	Opposition	Venue	Date	Scorecard
1st Wicket	286	Sanath Jayasuriya	Upul Tharanga	England	Headingley, Leeds, England	1 July 2006	Scorecard
2nd Wicket	212*	Kumar Sangakkara	Lahiru Thirimanne	England	Westpac Stadium, Wellington, New Zealand	1 March 2015 ‡	Scorecard
3rd Wicket	239	Avishka Fernando	Kusal Mendis	West Indies	Mahinda Rajapaksa International Stadium, Hambantota, Sri Lanka	26 February 2020	Scorecard
4th Wicket	185	Pathum Nissanka	Charith Asalanka	Bangladesh	Zohur Ahmed Chowdhury Stadium, Chittagong, Bangladesh	15 March 2024	Scorecard
5th Wicket	166	Russel Arnold	Sanath Jayasuriya	India	Sharjah Cricket Stadium, Sharjah, United Arab Emirates	29 October 2000	Scorecard
6th Wicket	177	Dasun Shanaka	Shehan Jayasuriya	Pakistan	National Stadium, Karachi, Pakistan	30 September 2019	Scorecard
7th Wicket	126*	Mahela Jayawardene	Upul Chandana	India	Rangiri Dambulla International Stadium, Dambulla, Sri Lanka	3 August 2005	Scorecard
8th Wicket	91	Dulip Liyanage	Kumar Dharmasena	West Indies	Queen's Park Oval, Port of Spain, Trinidad & Tobago	6 June 1997	Scorecard
9th Wicket	132 ♠	Angelo Mathews	Lasith Malinga	Australia	Melbourne Cricket Ground, Melbourne, Australia	3 November 2010	Scorecard
10th Wicket	58	Isuru Udana	Kasun Rajitha	South Africa	Axxess DSL St. Georges, Port Elizabeth, South Africa	13 March 2019	Scorecard
Last updated: 1 July 2020

=== Highest partnerships by runs ===
The highest ODI partnership by runs for any wicket is held by the West Indian pairing of Chris Gayle and Marlon Samuels who put together a second wicket partnership of 372 runs during the 2015 Cricket World Cup against Zimbabwe in February 2015. This broke the record of 331 runs set by Indian pair of Sachin Tendulkar and Rahul Dravid against New Zealand in 1999

Wicket	Runs	First batsman	Second batsman	Opposition	Venue	Date	Scorecard
1st Wicket	286	Sanath Jayasuriya	Upul Tharanga	England	Headingley, Leeds, England	1 July 2006	Scorecard
1st Wicket	282	Tillakaratne Dilshan	Upul Tharanga	Zimbabwe	Asgiriya Stadium, Kandy, Sri Lanka	10 March 2011 ‡	Scorecard
3rd Wicket	239	Avishka Fernando	Kusal Mendis	West Indies	Mahinda Rajapaksa International Stadium, Hambantota, Sri Lanka	26 February 2020	Scorecard
1st Wicket	237	Marvan Atapattu	Sanath Jayasuriya	Australia	Sydney Cricket Ground, Sydney, Australia	9 January 2003	Scorecard
1st Wicket	231*	Tillakaratne Dilshan	Upul Tharanga	England	Ranasinghe Premadasa Stadium, Colombo, Sri Lanka	26 March 2011 ‡	Scorecard
Last updated: 1 July 2020

=== Highest overall partnership runs by a pair ===
Rank	Runs	Innings	Players	Highest	Average	100/50	T20I career span
1	5,992	151	Mahela Jayawardene & Kumar Sangakkara	179	41.61	15/32	2000–2015
2	5,475	108	Tillakaratne Dilshan & Kumar Sangakkara	210*	53.67	20/19	2000–2015
3	5,462	144	Marvan Atapattu & Sanath Jayasuriya	237	39.29	14/26	1996–2007
4	3,802	105	Aravinda de Silva & Arjuna Ranatunga	153	37.27	8/18	1984–1999
5	3,430	83	Marvan Atapattu & Mahela Jayawardene	226	44.54	4/22	1998–2007
An asterisk (*) signifies an unbroken partnership (i.e. neither of the batsmen was dismissed before either the end of the allotted overs or the required score being reached). Last updated: 11 October 2022

== Umpiring records ==
=== Most matches umpired ===
An umpire in cricket is a person who officiates the match according to the Laws of Cricket. Two umpires adjudicate the match on the field, whilst a third umpire has access to video replays, and a fourth umpire looks after the match balls and other duties. The records below are only for on-field umpires.

Rudi Koertzen of South Africa holds the record for the most ODI matches umpired with 209. The current active Aleem Dar is currently at 208 matches. They are followed by New Zealand's Billy Bowden who officiated in 200 matches. Kumar Dharmasena is the most experienced Sri Lankan umpire having officiated in 137 matches.

Rank	Matches	Umpire	Period
1	137	Kumar Dharmasena†	2009–2025
2	122	Asoka de Silva	1999–2012
3	100	Ruchira Palliyaguruge†	2011–2025
4	56	K. T. Francis	1982–1999
5	52	Tyron Wijewardene	1999–2013
Last updated: 5 July 2025

== See also ==
- List of One Day International cricket records
- List of batsmen who have scored over 10,000 One Day International cricket runs
- List of One Day International cricket hat-tricks
- List of Test cricket records
- List of List A cricket records
- List of Cricket World Cup records
