= 1987–88 Australian Tri-Series =

International cricket tournament

1987–88 World Series
- Date: 2 January 1988 – 24 January 1988
- Location: Australia
- Result: Won by Australia; 2–0 in final series
Teams
Australia	New Zealand	Sri Lanka
Captains
Allan Border	Jeff Crowe	Ranjan Madugalle
Most runs
Dean Jones 461	Andrew Jones 416	Aravinda de Silva 279
Most wickets
Tony Dodemaide 18	Ewen Chatfield 17	Champaka Ramanayake 11

The 1987–88 World Series was a One Day International (ODI) cricket tri-series where Australia played host to New Zealand and Sri Lanka. Australia and New Zealand reached the Finals, which Australia won 2–0.

== Points table ==
Below is the final points tally:

Team	P	W	L	T	NR	Pts	RR
Australia	8	7	1	0	0	14	4.741
New Zealand	8	4	4	0	0	8	4.075
Sri Lanka	8	1	7	0	0	2	4.016

== Uniforms ==
Australia
Australia kit

New Zealand
New Zealand kit

Sri Lanka
Sri Lanka kit

== Result summary ==
2 January 1988
Scorecard

Australia; 249/7 (50 overs)	v	Sri Lanka; 168 (44.2 overs)
David Boon 56 (81); Aravinda de Silva 3/58 (10 overs)		Guy de Alwis 44 (42); Tony Dodemaide 5/21 (7.2 overs)

Australia won by 81 runs
WACA Ground, Perth
Umpires: Peter McConnell and Terry Prue
Player of the match: Steve Waugh (AUS)

- Sri Lanka elected to field first
- Tony Dodemaide (AUS) made his ODI debut
- Australia 2 points, Sri Lanka 0 points

3 January 1988 (D/N)
Scorecard

New Zealand; 232/9 (50 overs)	v	Australia; 231 (49.4 overs)
Andrew Jones 87 (107); Craig McDermott 2/37 (10 overs)		Dean Jones 92 (91); Richard Hadlee 3/35 (10 overs)

New Zealand won by 1 run
WACA Ground, Perth
Umpires: Peter McConnell and Robin Bailhache
Player of the match: Andrew Jones (NZ)

- New Zealand elected to bat first
- New Zealand 2 points, Australia 0 points

5 January 1988 (D/N)
Scorecard

Sri Lanka; 174 (48.2 overs)	v	New Zealand; 178/4 (48.4 overs)
Ravi Ratnayeke 41 (41); Ewen Chatfield 4/32 (9.2 overs)		Martin Crowe 52 (68); Champaka Ramanayake 2/28 (10 overs)

New Zealand won by 6 wickets
Sydney Cricket Ground, Sydney
Umpires: Dick French and Tony Crafter
Player of the match: Ewen Chatfield (NZ)

- Sri Lanka elected to bat first
- New Zealand 2 points, Sri Lanka 0 points

7 January 1988 (D/N)
Scorecard

Australia; 216 (49.4 overs)	v	New Zealand; 210/9 (50 overs)
Steve Waugh 68 (91); Martin Snedden 3/36 (10 overs)		Andrew Jones 59 (106); Craig McDermott 3/50 (10 overs)

Australia won by 6 runs
Melbourne Cricket Ground, Melbourne
Umpires: Peter McConnell and Robin Bailhache
Player of the match: Steve Waugh (AUS)

- Australia elected to bat first
- Australia 2 points, New Zealand 0 points

9 January 1988
Scorecard

Sri Lanka; 241 (49.5 overs)	v	New Zealand; 242/6 (49.5 overs)
Aravinda de Silva 51 (56); Richard Hadlee 3/35 (10 overs)		Andrew Jones 63 (116); Ravi Ratnayeke 2/44 (9.5 overs)

New Zealand won by 4 wickets
Adelaide Oval, Adelaide
Umpires: Len King and Peter McConnell
Player of the match: Richard Hadlee (NZ)

- Sri Lanka elected to bat first
- New Zealand 2 points, Sri Lanka 0 points

10 January 1988
Scorecard

Australia; 289/6 (50 overs)	v	Sri Lanka; 208/8 (50 overs)
David Boon 122 (130); Graeme Labrooy 1/44 (10 overs)		Roshan Mahanama 50 (77); Tony Dodemaide 3/27 (10 overs)

Australia won by 81 runs
Adelaide Oval, Adelaide
Umpires: Mel Johnson and Tony Crafter
Player of the match: David Boon (AUS)

- Australia elected to bat first
- Australia 2 points, Sri Lanka 0 points

12 January 1988
Scorecard

New Zealand; 199/7 (50 overs)	v	Sri Lanka; 200/6 (46.3 overs)
Richard Hadlee 52 (68); Ravi Ratnayeke 3/33 (9 overs)		Roshan Mahanama 58 (83); Richard Hadlee 2/22 (10 overs)

Sri Lanka won by 4 wickets
Bellerive Oval, Hobart
Umpires: Mel Johnson and Steve Randell
Player of the match: Roshan Mahanama (SRL)

- Sri Lanka elected to field first
- Sri Lanka 2 points, New Zealand 0 points

14 January 1988 (D/N)
Scorecard

Australia; 243/8 (50 overs)	v	Sri Lanka; 205 (44.5 overs)
Mike Veletta 46 (68); Graeme Labrooy 4/39 (10 overs)		Arjuna Ranatunga 67 (86); Peter Taylor 4/38 (10 overs)

Australia won by 38 runs
Melbourne Cricket Ground, Melbourne
Umpires: Dick French and Robin Bailhache
Player of the match: Peter Taylor (AUS)

- Australia elected to bat first
- Australia 2 points, Sri Lanka 0 points

16 January 1988
Scorecard

Sri Lanka; 164/8 (39 overs)	v	New Zealand; 167/6 (37.1 overs)
Brendon Kuruppu 47 (71); Ewen Chatfield 3/27 (9 overs)		Martin Crowe 43 (60); Champaka Ramanayake 2/28 (8 overs)

New Zealand won by 4 wickets
Gabba, Brisbane
Umpires: Colin Timmins and Robin Bailhache
Player of the match: Martin Crowe (NZ)

- New Zealand elected to field first
- New Zealand 2 points, Sri Lanka 0 points

17 January 1988
Scorecard

New Zealand; 176/5 (44 overs)	v	Australia; 177/5 (33.2 overs)
Andrew Jones 65 (131); Steve Waugh 2/23 (8 overs)		David Boon 48 (47); Martin Snedden 3/40 (8 overs)

Australia won by 5 wickets
Gabba, Brisbane
Umpires: Mel Johnson and Tony Crafter
Player of the match: Steve Waugh (AUS)

- Australia elected to field first
- Vaughan Brown (NZ) made his ODI debut
- Australia 2 points, New Zealand 0 points

19 January 1988 (D/N)
Scorecard

Sri Lanka; 188/9 (50 overs)	v	Australia; 189/7 (49.3 overs)
Aravinda de Silva 79 (100); Steve Waugh 4/33 (10 overs)		Mike Veletta 68 (91); Champaka Ramanayake 3/35 (10 overs)

Australia won by 3 wickets
Sydney Cricket Ground, Sydney
Umpires: Steve Randell and Terry Prue
Player of the match: Mike Veletta (AUS)

- Australia elected to field first
- Sanath Kaluperuma (SRL) made his ODI debut
- Australia 2 points, Sri Lanka 0 points

20 January 1988 (D/N)
Scorecard

Australia; 221/8 (50 overs)	v	New Zealand; 143 (44.5 overs)
Geoff Marsh 101 (148); Ewen Chatfield 2/26 (10 overs)		John Bracewell 38 (52); Simon Davis 3/27 (10 overs)

Australia won by 78 runs
Sydney Cricket Ground, Sydney
Umpires: Len King and Tony Crafter
Player of the match: Geoff Marsh (AUS)

- Australia elected to bat first
- Australia 2 points, New Zealand 0 points

== Final series ==
Australia won the best of three final series against New Zealand 2–0.

22 January 1988 (D/N)
Scorecard

New Zealand; 177 (49.5 overs)	v	Australia; 180/2 (44.5 overs)
Martin Crowe 48 (72); Simon Davis 2/27 (10 overs)		Dean Jones 58* (75); Willie Watson 2/36 (10 overs)

Australia won by 8 wickets
Melbourne Cricket Ground, Melbourne
Umpires: Robin Bailhache and Tony Crafter

- Australia elected to field first

24 January 1988
Scorecard

New Zealand; 168/5 (38 overs)	v	Australia; 169/4 (34.1 overs)
Andrew Jones 56* (82); Craig McDermott 2/29 (8 overs)		Dean Jones 53* (70); Martin Snedden2/45 (8 overs)

Australia won by 6 wickets
Sydney Cricket Ground, Sydney
Umpires: Peter McConnell and Tony Crafter
Player of the match: Dean Jones (AUS)

- Australia elected to field first
- Match reduced to 38 overs per innings
