= Dharshana Gamage =

Sri Lankan cricketer (born 1979)

Personal information
- Full name: Hewawasam Gamage Dharshana Nayanakantha
- Born: 2 March 1979 (age 47); Colombo, Sri Lanka
- Height: 6 ft 1 in (185 cm)
- Batting: Right-handed
- Bowling: Right-arm fast-medium
- Role: Bowler

International information
- National side: Sri Lanka (2003)
- ODI debut (cap 116): 13 May 2003 v New Zealand
- Last ODI: 11 June 2003 v West Indies

Career statistics
Competition	ODI	FC	LA	T20
Matches	3	101	73	10
Runs scored	3	660	153	49
Batting average	3.00	7.50	5.66	16.33
100s/50s	0/0	0/0	0/0	0/0
Top score	2*	40	28	17*
Balls bowled	95	11,216	2894	193
Wickets	2	249	91	8
Bowling average	41.50	26.46	23.71	28.12
5 wickets in innings	0	6	0	0
10 wickets in match	0	0	0	0
Best bowling	1/26	5/37	4/14	2/16
Catches/stumpings	2/–	27/–	17/–	1/–
- Source: Cricinfo, 9 July 2021

Hewawasam Gamage Dharshana Nayanakantha (born 2 March 1979), either spelt as Dharshana Nayanakantha or Dharshana Gamage, is a former Sri Lankan cricketer. He is a right-handed batsman and a right-arm medium-fast bowler. He studied at the Prince of Wales' College, Moratuwa. He is currently serving as the assistant coach of Sri Lanka Emerging cricket team.

== Career ==
He made his first-class debut playing for Sinhalese Sports Club in the 1998/99 Premier Trophy. He also played for Worcestershire as an overseas player in county cricket in England.

In April 2003, Dharshana received his maiden callup to the national team as he was surprisingly included in the squad as an injury replacement for Chaminda Vaas who was ruled out from the remainder of the Cherry Blossom Sharjah Cup 2003. However, he did not play in any of the matches. He made his ODI debut against New Zealand on 13 May 2003 at Dambulla during the 2003 Bank Alfalah Cup.

He made his Twenty20 debut on 17 August 2004, for Bloomfield Cricket and Athletic Club in the 2004 SLC Twenty20 Tournament.
