= International cricket in 2003 =

Cricket season

The 2003 international cricket season was from April to September.

== Season overview ==
International tours
Start date	Home team	Away team	Results [Matches]	
Start date	Home team	Away team	Test	ODI
10 April 2003	West Indies	Australia	1–3 [4]	3–4 [7]
24 April 2003	Bangladesh	South Africa	0–2 [2]	—
25 April 2003	Sri Lanka	New Zealand	0–0 [2]	—
22 May 2003	England	Zimbabwe	2–0 [2]	—
7 June 2003	West Indies	Sri Lanka	1–0 [2]	1–2 [3]
17 June 2003	England	Pakistan	—	2–1 [3]
18 July 2003	Australia	Bangladesh	2–0 [2]	3–0 [3]
24 July 2003	England	South Africa	2–2 [5]	—
20 August 2003	Pakistan	Bangladesh	3–0 [3]	5–0 [5]
International tournaments
Dates	Tournament		Winners	
11 April 2003	(Bangladesh) TVS Cup Tri series		India and South Africa	
10 May 2003	(Sri Lanka) Bank Alfalah Cup		New Zealand	
26 June 2003	(England) NatWest Series		England	

== April ==
=== Australia in the West Indies ===
Test series
No.	Date	Home captain	Away captain	Venue	Result
Test 1638	10–13 April	Brian Lara	Steve Waugh	Bourda, Georgetown, Guyana	Australia by 9 wickets
Test 1639	19–23 April	Brian Lara	Steve Waugh	Queen's Park Oval, Port of Spain, Trinidad	Australia by 118 runs
Test 1643	1–5 May	Brian Lara	Steve Waugh	Kensington Oval, Bridgetown, Barbados	Australia by 9 wickets
Test 1645	9–13 May	Brian Lara	Steve Waugh	Antigua Recreation Ground, St. John's, Antigua	West Indies by 3 wickets
ODI series
No.	Date	Home captain	Away captain	Venue	Result
ODI 2011	17 May	Brian Lara	Ricky Ponting	Sabina Park, Kingston, Jamaica	Australia by 2 runs (D/L)
ODI 2013	18 May	Brian Lara	Ricky Ponting	Sabina Park, Kingston, Jamaica	Australia by 8 wickets
ODI 2016	21 May	Brian Lara	Ricky Ponting	Beausejour Stadium, Gros Islet, Saint Lucia	Australia by 25 runs
ODI 2018	24 May	Brian Lara	Ricky Ponting	Queen's Park Oval, Port of Spain, Trinidad	Australia by 67 runs
ODI 2019	25 May	Brian Lara	Ricky Ponting	Queen's Park Oval, Port of Spain, Trinidad	West Indies by 39 runs
ODI 2020	30 May	Brian Lara	Ricky Ponting	National Cricket Stadium, St. George's, Grenada	West Indies by 3 wickets
ODI 2021	1 June	Brian Lara	Ricky Ponting	National Cricket Stadium, St. George's, Grenada	West Indies by 9 wickets

=== TVS Cup Tri series ===
Pos	Team	Pld	W	L	T	NR	Pts	NRR
1	India	4	3	1	0	0	18	+1.930
2	South Africa	4	3	1	0	0	17	+0.151
3	Bangladesh	4	0	4	0	0	1	–2.078

Group stage
No.	Date	Team 1	Captain 1	Team 2	Captain 2	Venue	Result
ODI 2001	11 April	Bangladesh	Khaled Mahmud	India	Sourav Ganguly	Bangabandhu National Stadium, Dhaka	India by 200 runs
ODI 2002	13 April	India	Sourav Ganguly	South Africa	Graeme Smith	Bangabandhu National Stadium, Dhaka	India by 153 runs
ODI 2003	14 April	Bangladesh	Khaled Mahmud	South Africa	Graeme Smith	Bangabandhu National Stadium, Dhaka	South Africa by 83 runs
ODI 2004	16 April	Bangladesh	Khaled Mahmud	India	Virender Sehwag	Bangabandhu National Stadium, Dhaka	India by 4 wickets
ODI 2005	17 April	Bangladesh	Khaled Mahmud	South Africa	Graeme Smith	Bangabandhu National Stadium, Dhaka	South Africa by 93 runs
ODI 2006	18 April	India	Sourav Ganguly	South Africa	Graeme Smith	Bangabandhu National Stadium, Dhaka	South Africa by 5 wickets
Final
ODI 2006a	20 April	India	Sourav Ganguly	South Africa	Graeme Smith	Bangabandhu National Stadium, Dhaka	Match abandoned
ODI 2007	21 April	India	Sourav Ganguly	South Africa	Graeme Smith	Bangabandhu National Stadium, Dhaka	No result

=== South Africa in Bangladesh ===
Test series
No.	Date	Home captain	Away captain	Venue	Result
Test 1640	24–27 April	Khaled Mahmud	Graeme Smith	M. A. Aziz Stadium, Chittagong	South Africa by an innings and 60 runs
Test 1642	1–4 May	Khaled Mahmud	Graeme Smith	Bangabandhu National Stadium, Dhaka	South Africa by an innings and 18 runs

=== New Zealand in Sri Lanka ===
Test series
No.	Date	Home captain	Away captain	Venue	Result
Test 1641	25–29 April	Hashan Tillakaratne	Stephen Fleming	Paikiasothy Saravanamuttu Stadium, Colombo	Match drawn
Test 1644	3–7 May	Hashan Tillakaratne	Stephen Fleming	Asgiriya Stadium, Kandy	Match drawn

== May ==
=== Bank Alfalah Cup ===
Pos	Team	Pld	W	L	T	NR	NRR	Pts
1	New Zealand	4	2	2	0	0	+0.273	13
2	Pakistan	4	2	2	0	0	+0.066	12
3	Sri Lanka	4	2	2	0	0	–0.332	11

Group stage
No.	Date	Team 1	Captain 1	Team 2	Captain 2	Venue	Result
ODI 2008	10 May	Sri Lanka	Marvan Atapattu	Pakistan	Rashid Latif	Rangiri Dambulla International Stadium, Dambulla	Pakistan by 79 runs
ODI 2009	11 May	New Zealand	Stephen Fleming	Pakistan	Rashid Latif	Rangiri Dambulla International Stadium, Dambulla	New Zealand by 7 wickets
ODI 2010	13 May	Sri Lanka	Marvan Atapattu	New Zealand	Stephen Fleming	Rangiri Dambulla International Stadium, Dambulla	Sri Lanka by 5 wickets
ODI 2012	18 May	Sri Lanka	Marvan Atapattu	Pakistan	Rashid Latif	Rangiri Dambulla International Stadium, Dambulla	Sri Lanka by 12 runs
ODI 2014	19 May	Sri Lanka	Marvan Atapattu	New Zealand	Stephen Fleming	Rangiri Dambulla International Stadium, Dambulla	New Zealand by 9 runs
ODI 2015	20 May	New Zealand	Stephen Fleming	Pakistan	Rashid Latif	Rangiri Dambulla International Stadium, Dambulla	Pakistan by 22 runs
Final
ODI 2017	23 May	New Zealand	Stephen Fleming	Pakistan	Rashid Latif	Rangiri Dambulla International Stadium, Dambulla	New Zealand by 4 wickets

=== Zimbabwe in England ===
Test series
No.	Date	Home captain	Away captain	Venue	Result
Test 1646	22–24 May	Nasser Hussain	Heath Streak	Lord's, London	England by an innings and 92 runs
Test 1647	5–7 June	Nasser Hussain	Heath Streak	Riverside Ground, Chester-le-Street	England by an innings and 69 runs

== June ==
=== Sri Lanka in the West Indies ===
ODI series
No.	Date	Home captain	Away captain	Venue	Result
ODI 2022	7 June	Brian Lara	Marvan Atapattu	Kensington Oval, Bridgetown, Barbados	Sri Lanka by 55 runs
ODI 2023	8 June	Brian Lara	Marvan Atapattu	Kensington Oval, Bridgetown, Barbados	Sri Lanka by 4 wickets
ODI 2024	11 June	Brian Lara	Marvan Atapattu	Arnos Vale Stadium, Kingstown, Saint Vincent	West Indies by 6 wickets (D/L)
Test series
No.	Date	Home captain	Away captain	Venue	Result
Test 1648	20–24 June	Brian Lara	Hashan Tillakaratne	Beausejour Stadium, Gros Islet, Saint Lucia	Match drawn
Test 1649	27–29 June	Brian Lara	Hashan Tillakaratne	Sabina Park, Kingston, Jamaica	West Indies by 7 wickets

=== Pakistan in England ===
ODI series
No.	Date	Home captain	Away captain	Venue	Result
ODI 2025	17 June	Michael Vaughan	Rashid Latif	Old Trafford, Manchester	Pakistan by 2 wickets
ODI 2026	20 June	Michael Vaughan	Rashid Latif	The Oval, London	England by 7 wickets
ODI 2027	22 June	Michael Vaughan	Rashid Latif	Lord's, London	England by 4 wickets

=== NatWest Series ===
Pos	Team	Pld	W	L	T	NR	Pts	NRR
1	South Africa	6	4	2	0	0	23	+0.480
2	England	6	3	2	0	1	22	+0.825
3	Zimbabwe	6	1	4	0	1	9	–1.370

Group stage
No.	Date	Team 1	Captain 1	Team 2	Captain 2	Venue	Result
ODI 2028	26 June	England	Michael Vaughan	Zimbabwe	Heath Streak	Trent Bridge, Nottingham	Zimbabwe by 4 wickets
ODI 2029	28 June	England	Marcus Trescothick	South Africa	Graeme Smith	The Oval, London	England by 6 wickets
ODI 2030	29 June	South Africa	Graeme Smith	Zimbabwe	Heath Streak	St Lawrence Ground, Canterbury	South Africa by 46 runs
ODI 2031	1 July	England	Michael Vaughan	Zimbabwe	Heath Streak	Headingley, Leeds	No result
ODI 2032	3 July	England	Michael Vaughan	South Africa	Graeme Smith	Old Trafford, Manchester	South Africa by 7 wickets
ODI 2033	5 July	South Africa	Graeme Smith	Zimbabwe	Heath Streak	SWALEC Stadium, Cardiff	South Africa by 9 wickets
ODI 2034	6 July	England	Michael Vaughan	Zimbabwe	Heath Streak	County Ground, Bristol	England by 6 wickets
ODI 2035	8 July	England	Michael Vaughan	South Africa	Graeme Smith	Edgbaston, Birmingham	England by 4 wickets
ODI 2036	10 July	South Africa	Graeme Smith	Zimbabwe	Heath Streak	Rose Bowl, Southampton	South Africa by 7 wickets
Final
ODI 2037	12 July	England	Michael Vaughan	South Africa	Graeme Smith	Lord's, London	England by 7 wickets

== July ==
=== Bangladesh in Australia ===
Test series
No.	Date	Home captain	Away captain	Venue	Result
Test 1650	18–20 July	Steve Waugh	Khaled Mahmud	Marrara Oval, Darwin	Australia by an innings and 132 runs
Test 1652	25–28 July	Steve Waugh	Khaled Mahmud	Bundaberg Rum Stadium, Cairns	Australia by an innings and 98 runs
ODI series
No.	Date	Home captain	Away captain	Venue	Result
ODI 2038	2 August	Ricky Ponting	Khaled Mahmud	Bundaberg Rum Stadium, Cairns	Australia by 8 wickets
ODI 2039	3 August	Ricky Ponting	Khaled Mahmud	Bundaberg Rum Stadium, Cairns	Australia by 9 wickets
ODI 2040	6 August	Ricky Ponting	Khaled Mahmud	Marrara Oval, Darwin	Australia by 112 runs

=== South Africa in England ===
Test series
No.	Date	Home captain	Away captain	Venue	Result
Test 1651	24–28 July	Nasser Hussain	Graeme Smith	Edgbaston, Birmingham	Match drawn
Test 1653	31 July–3 August	Michael Vaughan	Graeme Smith	Lord's, London	South Africa by an innings and 92 runs
Test 1655	14–18 August	Michael Vaughan	Graeme Smith	Trent Bridge, Nottingham	England by 70 runs
Test 1656	21–25 August	Michael Vaughan	Graeme Smith	Headingley, Leeds	South Africa by 191 runs
Test 1659	4–8 September	Michael Vaughan	Graeme Smith	The Oval, London	England by 9 wickets

== August ==
=== Bangladesh in Pakistan ===
Test series
No.	Date	Home captain	Away captain	Venue	Result
Test 1655	20–24 August	Rashid Latif	Khaled Mahmud	National Stadium, Karachi	Pakistan by 7 wickets
Test 1657	27–30 August	Rashid Latif	Khaled Mahmud	Arbab Niaz Stadium, Peshawar	Pakistan by 9 wickets
Test 1658	3–6 September	Rashid Latif	Khaled Mahmud	Multan Cricket Stadium, Multan	Pakistan by 1 wicket
ODI series
No.	Date	Home captain	Away captain	Venue	Result
ODI 2041	9 September	Inzamam-ul-Haq	Khaled Mahmud	Multan Cricket Stadium, Multan	Pakistan by 117 runs
ODI 2042	12 September	Inzamam-ul-Haq	Khaled Mahmud	Iqbal Stadium, Faisalabad	Pakistan by 74 runs
ODI 2043	15 September	Inzamam-ul-Haq	Khaled Mahmud	Gaddafi Stadium, Lahore	Pakistan by 42 runs (D/L)
ODI 2044	18 September	Inzamam-ul-Haq	Khaled Mahmud	Rawalpindi Cricket Stadium, Rawalpindi	Pakistan by 5 wickets
ODI 2045	21 September	Inzamam-ul-Haq	Khaled Mahmud	National Stadium, Karachi	Pakistan by 58 runs
