= Sri Lankan cricket team in the Netherlands in 2006 =

| | Sri Lanka | Netherlands |
- Dates: 4 July – 6 July
| Captains | Mahela Jayawardene | Luuk van Troost |

One Day International series
- Results: Sri Lanka won the 2-match series 2–0
| Most runs | Tillakaratne Dilshan (183) | Darron Reekers (84) |
| Most wickets | Kaushal Lokuarachchi (7) | Darron Reekers (4) |

The Sri Lankan cricket team toured Netherlands from 4 to 6 July 2006. The tour was for two One Day Internationals (ODIs) between Sri Lanka and Netherlands.

== Squads ==
| Netherlands | Sri Lanka |
|---|---|
| Bas Zuiderent | Upul Tharanga |
| Darron Reekers | Sanath Jayasuriya |
| Ryan ten Doeschate | Mahela Jayawardene (c) |
| Daan van Bunge | Kumar Sangakkara (wk) |
| Tim de Leede | Tillakaratne Dilshan |
| Alexei Kervezee | Chamara Kapugedera |
| Luuk van Troost (c) | Farveez Maharoof |
| Peter Borren | Kaushal Lokuarachchi |
| Billy Stelling | Malinga Bandara |
| Jeroen Smits (wk) | Lasith Malinga |
| Mohammad Kashif | Dilhara Fernando |
| Eric Szwarczynski | Russel Arnold |
| Pieter Seelaar | Ruchira Perera |

== Matches ==
=== 1st ODI ===
4 July 2006
Scorecard

| Sri Lanka; 443/9 (50 overs) | v | Netherlands; 248 (48.3 overs) |
| Sanath Jayasuriya 157 (104); Billy Stelling 2/77 (10 overs) | | Tim de Leede 51 (42); Kaushal Lokuarachchi3/41 (9.3 overs) |

Sri Lanka won by 195 runs
VRA Cricket Ground, Amstelveen
Umpires: Steve Bucknor (WI) and Shahul Hameed (INA)
Player of the match: Sanath Jayasuriya (SL)

- Sri Lanka won the toss and elected to bat.
- Peter Borren, Ryan ten Doeschate, Mohammad Kashif, Alexei Kervezee, Darron Reekers, and Billy Stelling (Ned) all made their ODI debuts.
- Sri Lanka's total was the highest team total in ODIs.

=== 2nd ODI ===
6 July 2006
Scorecard

| Sri Lanka; 313/8 (50 overs) | v | Netherlands; 258 (49 overs) |
| Upul Tharanga 72 (72); Darron Reekers 3/54 (10 overs) | | Darron Reekers 45 (39); Kaushal Lokuarachchi 4/44 (10 overs) |

Sri Lanka won by 55 runs
VRA Cricket Ground, Amstelveen
Umpires: Steve Bucknor (WI) and Shahul Hameed (INA)
Player of the match: Darron Reekers (Ned)

- Sri Lanka won the toss and elected to bat.
- Pieter Seelaar and Eric Szwarczynski (Ned) both made their ODI debuts.
