= 2003 Bank Alfalah Cup =

- Date: 10-23 May 2003
- Location: Sri Lanka
- Result: Won by New Zealand
- Player of the series: Shoaib Malik (PAK)
Teams
New Zealand	Pakistan	Sri Lanka
Captains
Stephen Fleming	Rashid Latif	Marvan Atapattu
Most runs
Stephen Fleming (121)	Shoaib Malik (170)	Tillakaratne Dilshan (71)
Most wickets
Daniel Vettori (10)	Mohammad Sami (10)	Muttiah Muralitharan (13)

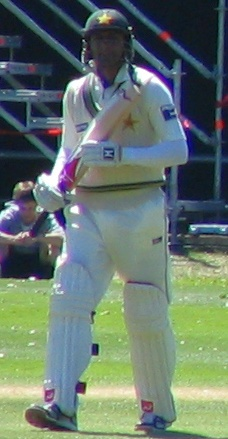

The 2003 Bank Alfalah Cup was a triangular ODI cricket competition held in Rangiri Dambulla International Stadium, Dambulla from 10 to 23 May 2003. It featured the national cricket teams of New Zealand, Pakistan and Sri Lanka. The tournament was won by New Zealand, who defeated Pakistan in the final.

== Points table ==
Team	Pld	W	L	T	NR	NRR	Pts
New Zealand	4	2	2	0	0	+0.196	13
Pakistan	4	2	2	0	0	+0.061	12
Sri Lanka	4	2	2	0	0	-0.259	11

=== 1st ODI ===
10 May (D/N)
Scorecard

Pakistan; 199/8 (50 overs)	v	Sri Lanka; 120 (43.1 overs)
Mohammad Hafeez 53 (114); Muttiah Muralitharan 3/38 (10 overs)		Kumar Sangakkara 29 (57); Shoaib Malik 2/19 (8 overs); Mohammad Sami 2/19 (7.1 overs)

Pakistan won by 79 runs
Rangiri Dambulla International Stadium, Dambulla
Umpires: Peter Manuel (SL) and Simon Taufel (AUS)
Player of the match: Mohammad Hafeez (Pak)

- Sri Lanka won the toss and elected to field.
- Points: Pakistan 6, Sri Lanka 0

=== 2nd ODI ===
11 May (D/N)
Scorecard

Pakistan; 116 (43.1 overs)	v	New Zealand; 117/3 (27.3 overs)
Shoaib Akhtar 27 (38); Shane Bond 2/7 (5 overs)		Chris Nevin 28 (29); Abdul Razzaq 2/19 (6 overs)

New Zealand won by 7 wickets
Rangiri Dambulla International Stadium, Dambulla
Umpires: Asoka de Silva (SL) and Daryl Harper (Aus)
Player of the match: Daryl Tuffey (NZ)

- New Zealand won the toss and elected to field.
- Points: New Zealand 6, Pakistan 0

=== 3rd ODI ===
13 May (D/N)
Scorecard

New Zealand; 139 (43.1 overs)	v	Sri Lanka; 143/5 (43.4 overs)
Lou Vincent 32 (72); Muttiah Muralitharan 3/16 (8.1 overs)		Romesh Kaluwitharana 48 (119); Jacob Oram 3/12 (9 overs)

Sri Lanka won by 5 wickets
Rangiri Dambulla International Stadium, Dambulla
Umpires: Tyron Wijewardene (SL) and Simon Taufel (AUS)
Player of the match: Romesh Kaluwitharana (SL)

- Sri Lanka won the toss and elected to field.
- Dharshana Gamage (SL) made his ODI debut.
- Points: Sri Lanka 5, New Zealand 1

=== 4th ODI ===
18 May
Scorecard

Sri Lanka; 172 (49.5 overs)	v	Pakistan; 160 (47.3 overs)
Tillakaratne Dilshan 46 (93); Shoaib Malik 2/30 (8 overs)		Shoaib Malik 33 (54); Muttiah Muralitharan 5/23 (9.4 overs)

Sri Lanka won by 12 runs
Rangiri Dambulla International Stadium, Dambulla
Umpires: Tyron Wijewardene (SL) and Daryl Harper (Aus)
Player of the match: Muttiah Muralitharan (SL)

- Pakistan won the toss and elected to field.
- Points: Sri Lanka 5, Pakistan 1

=== 5th ODI ===
19 May
Scorecard

New Zealand; 156/8 (50 overs)	v	Sri Lanka; 147 (49.1 overs)
Brendon McCullum 47* (63); Sanath Jayasuriya 2/35 (9 overs)		Mahela Jayawardene 38 (102); Daniel Vettori 4/14 (10 overs)

New Zealand won by 9 runs
Rangiri Dambulla International Stadium, Dambulla
Umpires: Peter Manuel (SL) and Simon Taufel (AUS)
Player of the match: Daniel Vettori (NZ)

- Sri Lanka won the toss and elected to field.
- Points: New Zealand 5, Sri Lanka 1

=== 6th ODI ===
20 May
Scorecard

Pakistan; 203/9 (50 overs)	v	New Zealand; 181 (48.1 overs)
Shoaib Malik 74 (72); Daniel Vettori 3/34 (10 overs)		Scott Styris 46 (99); Danish Kaneria 3/31 (10 overs)

Pakistan won by 22 runs
Rangiri Dambulla International Stadium, Dambulla
Umpires: Peter Manuel (SL) and Daryl Harper (Aus)
Player of the match: Shoaib Malik (PAK)

- New Zealand won the toss and elected to field.
- Yasir Hameed (PAK) made his ODI debut.
- Points: Pakistan 5, New Zealand 1

== Final ==
23 May (D/N)
Scorecard

Pakistan; 198 (50 overs)	v	New Zealand; 200/6 (45.2 overs)
Younis Khan 70* (85); Daryl Tuffey 3/32 (9 overs)		Stephen Fleming 65 (111); Mohammad Sami 3/42 (10 overs)

New Zealand won by 4 wickets
Rangiri Dambulla International Stadium, Dambulla
Umpires: Asoka de Silva (SL) and Daryl Harper (Aus)
Player of the match: Stephen Fleming (NZ)

- Pakistan won the toss and elected to bat.
- New Zealand won the Bank Alfalah Cup 2003
- Faisal Athar (Pak) made his ODI debut.
