= Sri Lankan cricket team in Ireland in 2014 =

	Sri Lanka	Ireland
- Dates: 6 – 8 May 2014
Captains	Angelo Mathews	William Porterfield

One Day International series
- Results: Sri Lanka won the 2-match series 1–0
Most runs	Nuwan Kulasekara (42)	William Porterfield (37)
Most wickets	Tim Murtagh (2)	Ajantha Mendis (3)

The Sri Lanka cricket team toured Ireland from 6 to 8 May 2014 for a two-match One Day International (ODI) series. They won the series 1–0 after winning the first match. The second ODI wad rained off.

== Squads ==
ODI
Sri Lanka	Ireland
Angelo Mathews (c); Lahiru Thirimanne (vc); Dinesh Chandimal (wk); Chathuranga de Silva; Niroshan Dickwella; Shaminda Eranga; Nuwan Kulasekara; Suranga Lakmal; Ajantha Mendis; Kusal Perera; Dhammika Prasad; Ashan Priyanjan; Sachithra Senanayake; Upul Tharanga; Kithuruwan Vithanage; Thisara Perera	William Porterfield (c); Alex Cusack; George Dockrell; Ed Joyce; Andrew McBrine; Tim Murtagh; Kevin O'Brien; Niall O'Brien (wk); Andrew Poynter; Max Sorensen; Paul Stirling; Stuart Thompson; Gary Wilson (wk)

== ODI series ==
=== 1st ODI ===
6 May 2014
10:45
Scorecard

Sri Lanka; 219/8 (50 overs)	v	Ireland; 140 (39.5 overs)
Nuwan Kulasekara 42* (34); Tim Murtagh 2/21 (10 overs)		William Porterfield 37 (87); Ajantha Mendis 3/27 (10 overs)

Sri Lanka won by 79 runs
Clontarf Cricket Club Ground, Dublin
Umpires: Richard Kettleborough (Eng) and Richard Smith (Ire)
Player of the match: Ajantha Mendis (SL)

- Ireland won the toss and elected to field.

=== 2nd ODI ===
8 May 2014
10:45
Scorecard

Ireland	v	Sri Lanka

Match Abandoned
Clontarf Cricket Club Ground, Dublin
Umpires: Richard Kettleborough (Eng) and Richard Smith (Ire)

- Rain meant match was abandoned without a ball being bowled

== See also ==
- 2014 Irish cricket season
