= Sri Lankan cricket team in the West Indies in 1995–96 =

International cricket tour

The Sri Lanka national cricket team visited the West Indies in April 1996 and played a single Limited Overs International (LOI) only on 13 April 1996 at Queen's Park Oval, Port of Spain, Trinidad, against the West Indies cricket team. The match was played to celebrate 100 years of cricket at the Queen's Park Oval.

Sri Lanka won by 35 runs and were captained by Arjuna Ranatunga; West Indies by Courtney Walsh.

== ODI summary ==
13 April 1996
Scorecard
Wisden report

Sri Lanka; 251 (48.3 overs)	v	West Indies; 216/9 (50 overs)
AP Gurusinha 59 (107); RA Harper 3/34 (9.3 overs)		BC Lara 71 (93); HDPK Dharmasena 2/33 (9 overs)

Sri Lanka won by 35 runs
Queen's Park Oval, Port of Spain, Trinidad
Umpires: CE Cumberbatch and EA Nicholls
Player of the match: HDPK Dharmasena (SL)

- Sri Lanka won the toss and elected to bat.
