= Darron Reekers =

Dutch cricketer (born 1973)

Dover Reekers
Personal information
- Full name: Darron John Reekers
- Born: 26 May 1973 (age 53); Christchurch, New Zealand
- Batting: Right-handed
- Bowling: Right-arm medium
- Role: Opening batsman

International information
- National side: Netherlands (2006–2009)
- ODI debut (cap 28): 4 July 2006 v Sri Lanka
- Last ODI: 8 April 2009 v Bermuda
- ODI shirt no.: 16
- T20I debut (cap 5): 2 August 2008 v Kenya
- Last T20I: 5 August 2008 v Ireland
- T20I shirt no.: 16

Domestic team information
- Years: Team
- 1994/95–1995/96: Canterbury
- 1997/98: Otago
- 1999/00–2001/02: Canterbury

Career statistics
Competition	ODI	T20I	FC	LA
Matches	19	6	6	82
Runs scored	481	64	129	1,366
Batting average	25.31	12.80	14.33	18.71
100s/50s	1/0	0/0	0/0	1/4
Top score	104	29	33*	104
Balls bowled	510	–	492	2,423
Wickets	13	–	12	51
Bowling average	33.53	–	23.08	35.62
5 wickets in innings	0	–	0	0
10 wickets in match	0	–	0	0
Best bowling	3/54	–	3/25	3/41
Catches/stumpings	7/–	2/–	5/–	31/1
- Source: Cricinfo, 13 June 2009

Darron John Reekers (born 26 May 1973) is a New Zealand former cricketer who represented the Netherlands national cricket team. He was a right-handed batsman and right-arm medium pace bowler.

Reekers, born in Christchurch in 1973, attended St Thomas of Canterbury College. He began his cricket career with Canterbury in the 1991–92 season, making his senior debut in December 1994. Reekers played eight List A matches for Canterbury in 1994–95 and two the following season. He then moved to Otago for the 1997–98 season, where he played 10 List A and three first-class matches, marking the only domestic first-class games of his career.

Reekers made his debut for the Netherlands national cricket team in 2001 and became eligible for international competition in 2004. He played in the 2004 ICC Six Nations Challenge and made his One Day International (ODI) debut in 2006. Reekers played 19 ODIs and six Twenty20 Internationals for the team, retiring in 2009. He also played for Quick Haag in the Dutch Topklasse league from 1998 to 2009 before retiring and returning to New Zealand.
