= Brendon Kuruppu =

Sri Lankan cricketer

Personal information
- Full name: Don Sardha Brendon Priyantha Kuruppu
- Born: 5 January 1962 (age 64); Colombo, Sri Lanka
- Batting: Right-handed
- Role: Wicketkeeper-batsman

International information
- National side: Sri Lanka (1983–1991)
- Test debut (cap 132): 16 April 1987 v New Zealand
- Last Test: 22 August 1991 v England
- ODI debut (cap 35): 30 April 1983 v Australia
- Last ODI: 2 May 1990 v Australia

Career statistics
Competition	Test	ODI
Matches	4	54
Runs scored	320	1022
Batting average	53.33	20.03
100s/50s	1/0	0/4
Top score	201*	72
Catches/stumpings	1/0	30/8
- Source: Cricinfo, 14 August 2005

Don Sardha Brendon Priyantha Kuruppu (born 5 January 1962) is a former Sri Lankan cricketer who played as a wicket-keeper and opening batsman. He is one of few batsmen in the world to score a double century on debut. Brendon was often played in One Day Internationals, making 54 appearances for the national team from 1983 to 1990, but his short Test career was largely unremarkable but for one productive innings in Colombo when he scored 201, becoming the first batsman to score a Test century on debut for Sri Lanka.

Kuruppu is the current coach of the Maldives national cricket team. In November 2018, he was named on Sri Lanka Cricket's National Selection Panel.

== Early life ==
Kuruppu was born in Colombo in January 1962, and played school cricket for Ananda College and club cricket for Bloomfield Cricket and Athletic and Burgher Recreation Clubs.

== International career ==
His international career started at the 1983 World Cup in England, where he hit two sixes and seven fours in what was to be a career-best 72 against Pakistan. Sri Lanka lost by 50 runs, and his next three matches were disappointing, as the team lost all three and he failed to pass 30. However, at Derby against New Zealand he found form again with 62, anchoring a chase towards 182 as Sri Lanka won by three wickets – their only win in the tournament.

Kuruppu was in and out of the ODI team following the successful World Cup, but did not play as a regular wicket-keeper until 1986, when he got his chance in the Asia Cup tournament against Pakistan and Bangladesh, which Sri Lanka won. He made a string of low scores, but nevertheless made an impression.

The next winter, Kuruppu got his Test debut against New Zealand at Colombo Cricket Club Ground, he was called up in place of Guy de Alwis, whose continued failings with the bat had given the selectors some thought. In a match frequently interrupted by rain, and against such accomplished bowlers as Richard Hadlee and Ewen Chatfield, Kuruppu made his maiden first-class century on the second day. Sidath Wettimuny held the Sri Lankan record for the highest Test individual innings, after scoring 190 against England in 1984, Kuruppu, however, passed that score by 11 runs, making 201 not out in 777 minutes to become the first Sri Lankan to hit a double Test century. Six men have later repeated his feat.

The two teams agreed to cancel the rest of the series owing to security fears, following a bomb blast near the New Zealand team's hotel. However, the double century cemented his place in the selectors' minds, and by the end of the three-team World Series tournament in January 1988, he was a regular fixture in the ODI side. However, he failed to back that up with the bat, and after a disastrous Nehru Cup in October 1989, where he strung together 36 runs in five innings and Sri Lanka finished last out of the sixth teams, Kuruppu was shuffled out of the team and Hashan Tillakaratne took his place behind the stumps. He was given one last chance as opener in 1991 when Sri Lanka travelled to England for a Test, but Sri Lanka lost by 137 runs and Kuruppu only made scores of 5 and 21. That was his last international game.

Kuruppu went on to work within Sri Lankan cricket, and he was made National Team Coach for the Commonwealth Games in Malaysia in 1998, Team Manager of Sri Lanka A Team for Tours of South Africa 1997–98, Under 19 team manager for world cup in New Zealand in 2001–02, Team Manager for the Sri Lanka National Team tours of Pakistan and New Zealand in 2004 and UAE Tour in 2005 and reappointed as Manager in 2009–10 for the T20 World Cup in UK, ICC Champions Trophy in South Africa and Test series in India.

Kuruppu also served as a Sri Lanka National Selector on five occasions in the years of 1999, 2000, 2011, 2015, and 2018.

Kuruppu also Coached the National Teams of Singapore & Maldives.

== Records ==
Kuruppu has played the fewest Test matches of any double centurion (four Tests), and holds the record for scoring the slowest Test match double century in terms of balls (548) and minutes (777). He became the first opening batsman to score double hundred on debut and only the third player to do so, after R. E. Foster and Lawrence Rowe. He holds the record for the longest innings as a Test debutant (777 minutes), and was the first wicket-keeper to score a century on Test debut.

== See also ==
- List of centuries scored on Test cricket debut
