= Champaka Ramanayake =

Sri Lankan cricketer (born 1965)

Personal information
- Full name: Champaka Priyadarshana Hewage Ramanayake
- Born: 8 January 1965 (age 61); Galle, Sri Lanka
- Batting: Right-handed
- Bowling: Right-arm fast-medium

International information
- National side: Sri Lanka (1986–1995)
- Test debut (cap 40): 12 February 1988 v Australia
- Last Test: 14 September 1993 v South Africa
- ODI debut (cap 49): 8 March 1986 v Pakistan
- Last ODI: 14 April 1995 v India

Career statistics
| Competition | Test | ODI |
|---|---|---|
| Matches | 18 | 62 |
| Runs scored | 143 | 210 |
| Batting average | 9.53 | 10.00 |
| 100s/50s | 0/0 | 0/0 |
| Top score | 34* | 26 |
| Balls bowled | 3,654 | 2864 |
| Wickets | 44 | 68 |
| Bowling average | 42.72 | 30.13 |
| 5 wickets in innings | 1 | 0 |
| 10 wickets in match | 0 | 0 |
| Best bowling | 5/82 | 4/17 |
| Catches/stumpings | 6/– | 11/– |
- Source: Cricinfo, 9 February 2017

Champaka Priyadarshana Hewage Ramanayake (born 8 January 1965), or Champaka Ramanayake, is a Sri Lankan former cricketer who played in 18 Test matches and 62 One Day Internationals from 1986 to 1995.

Champaka is a cricket coach. He worked as the national fast bowling coach for Sri Lanka Cricket board for 15 years and Bangladesh Cricket Board for two years. One of Champaka's greatest achievements is discovering Lasith Malinga at the age of 16 and coaching him.

He is the current high performance fast bowling coach of the Bangladesh national side.

== Early life ==
Champaka was born at Galle and had his education at Richmond College.

== Trivia ==
Champaka remains the only person to have bowled in international cricket at Ray Mitchell Oval, in Mackay, Australia. The venue hosted its only international match during the 1992 Cricket World Cup, and the match was washed out after his first two deliveries.
