= 1996 Cricket World Cup squads =

This is a list of the final 14-man squads named for the 1996 Cricket World Cup in India, Pakistan and Sri Lanka which took place from 14 February 1996 to 17 March 1996. The oldest player at the 1996 Cricket World Cup was Nolan Clarke (47) of The Netherlands while the youngest player was Thomas Odoyo (17) of Kenya.

== Australia ==
- Coach: (Australia) Geoff Marsh
- Oldest Player : Ian Healy (31y 286d)
- Youngest Player : Ricky Ponting (21y 53d)
- Average Age : 27 y 209d

Player	Date of birth	Age	Matches before 1996 WC	WC Matches before 1996 WC	Batting style	Bowling style	First-class team
Mark Taylor (c)	27 October 1964	31y 106d	89	2	Left hand	Right-arm medium	New South Wales
Michael Bevan	8 May 1970	25y 278d	25	-	Left hand	Slow left-arm wrist spin	New South Wales
Damien Fleming	24 April 1970	25y 292d	14	-	Right hand	Right-arm fast-medium	Victoria
Ian Healy (wk) (vc)	30 April 1964	31y 286d	139	7	Right hand	Wicket-keeper	Queensland
Stuart Law	18 October 1968	27y 115d	14	-	Right hand	Right-arm medium	Queensland
Shane Lee	8 August 1973	22y 186d	6	-	Right hand	Right–arm medium	New South Wales
Craig McDermott	14 April 1965	30y 302d	137	16	Right hand	Right-arm fast	Queensland
Glenn McGrath	9 February 1970	26y 1d	44	-	Right hand	Right arm fast-medium	New South Wales
Ricky Ponting	19 December 1974	21y 53d	16	-	Right hand	Right arm medium	Tasmania
Paul Reiffel	19 April 1966	29y 297d	55	-	Right hand	Right-arm fast-medium	Victoria
Michael Slater	21 February 1970	25y 354d	33	-	Right hand	Right arm medium	New South Wales
Shane Warne	13 September 1969	26y 150d	52	-	Right hand	Right-arm leg break	Victoria
Mark Waugh	2 June 1965	30y 253d	106	5	Right hand	Right-arm medium Right-arm off-break	New South Wales
Steve Waugh	2 June 1965	30y 253d	189	16	Right hand	Right-arm medium	New South Wales

== England ==
- Coach: (England) Ray Illingworth
- Oldest Player : Alec Stewart (32y 308d)
- Youngest Player: Dominic Cork (24y 187d)
- Average age : 29y 68d
- Dermot Reeve was called up for the team as injury replacement for Craig White

Player !	Date of birth	Age	Matches before 1996 WC	WC Matches before 1996 WC	Batting style	Bowling style	First-class team
Michael Atherton (c)	23 March 1968	27y 324d	31	-	Right hand	Right arm leg break Wicket-keeper	(England) Lancashire
Dominic Cork	7 August 1971	24y 187d	14	-	Right hand	Right-arm fast-medium	(England) Derbyshire
Phillip DeFreitas	18 February 1966	29y 357d	97	18	Right hand	Right arm fast-medium	(England) Lancashire
Neil Fairbrother	9 September 1963	32y 154d	51	9	Left hand	Left-arm medium	(England) Lancashire
Darren Gough	18 September 1970	25y 145d	16	-	Right hand	Right-arm fast	(England) Yorkshire
Graeme Hick	23 May 1966	29y 263d	54	10	Right hand	Right arm off-break	(England) Worcestershire
Peter Martin	15 November 1968	27y 87d	7	-	Right hand	Right-arm fast-medium	(England) Lancashire
Richard Illingworth	23 August 1963	32y 171d	21	-	Right hand	Slow left-arm orthodox	(England) Worcestershire
Jack Russell (wk)	15 August 1963	32y 179d	31	-	Left hand	Right arm off break	(England) Gloucestershire
Neil Smith	27 July 1967	28y 198d	2	-	Right hand	Right-arm off break	(England) Warwickshire
Robin Smith	13 September 1963	32y 150d	69	8	Right hand	Right arm leg-break	(England) Hampshire
Alec Stewart	8 April 1963	32y 308d	68	10	Right hand	Right-arm medium	(England) Surrey
Graham Thorpe	1 August 1969	26y 193d	19	-	Left hand	Right arm medium	(England) Surrey
Craig White	16 December 1969	26y 56d	8	-	Right hand	Right-arm fast-medium	(England) Yorkshire
Dermot Reeve	2 April 1963	32y 319d	27	9	Right hand	Right-arm medium	(England) Warwickshire

== India ==
Coach/manager: (India) Ajit Wadekar

- Oldest Player: Mohammad Azharuddin (33y 2d)
- Youngest Player: Sachin Tendulkar (22y 292d)
- Average age: 27y 168d

Player	Date of birth	Age	Matches before 1996 WC	WC Matches before 1996 WC	Batting style	Bowling style	First-class team
Mohammad Azharuddin (c)	8 February 1963	33y 2d	200	15	Right hand	Right-arm medium	(India) Hyderabad
Sachin Tendulkar (vc)	24 April 1973	22y 292d	102	8	Right hand	Right-arm medium Right-arm leg break Right-arm off-break	(India) Mumbai
Vinod Kambli	18 January 1972	24y 23d	62	5	Left hand	Right-arm off-break	(India) Mumbai
Aashish Kapoor	25 March 1971	24y 322d	7	-	Right hand	Right-arm offbreak	(India) Punjab
Anil Kumble	17 October 1970	25y 116d	72	-	Right hand	Right-arm leg spin	(India) Karnataka
Sanjay Manjrekar	12 July 1965	30y 213d	59	6	Right hand	Right arm off-spin	(India) Mumbai
Nayan Mongia (wk)	19 December 1969	26y 53d	35	-	Right hand	Wicket-keeper	(India) Baroda
Manoj Prabhakar	15 April 1963	32y 301d	126	15	Right hand	Right-arm medium pace	(India) Delhi
Venkatesh Prasad	5 August 1969	26y 189d	21	-	Right hand	Right-arm medium-fast	(India) Karnataka
Navjot Singh Sidhu	20 October 1963	32y 113d	93	7	Right hand	Right-arm medium	(India) Punjab
Javagal Srinath	31 August 1969	26y 163d	83	8	Right hand	Right arm fast	(India) Karnataka
Ajay Jadeja	1 February 1971	25y 9d	42	6	Right hand	Right-arm medium	(India) Haryana
Salil Ankola	1 March 1968	27y 346d	14	-	Right hand	Right-arm fast	(India) Mumbai
Venkatapathy Raju	9 July 1969	26y 216d	42	7	Right hand	Slow left-arm orthodox	(India) Hyderabad

== Kenya ==
Coach: (India) Hanumant Singh

Player	Date of birth	Batting style	Bowling style	First-class team
Maurice Odumbe (c)	15 June 1969	Right hand	Right-arm offbreak	(Kenya) Aga Khan, Nairobi
Rajab Ali	19 November 1965	Right hand	Right-arm medium-fast	n/a
Dipak Chudasama	20 May 1963	Right hand	–	n/a
Tariq Iqbal	3 April 1964	Right hand	Wicket-keeper	n/a
Aasif Karim	15 September 1963	Right hand	Slow left-arm orthodox	(Kenya) Jaffery, Mombasa
Hitesh Modi	13 October 1971	Left hand	Slow left-arm orthodox	(Kenya) Nairobi Gymkhana, Kisumu
Thomas Odoyo	12 May 1978	Right hand	Right arm medium-fast	(Kenya) Nairobi Gymkhana, Kisumu
Edward Odumbe	19 May 1965	Right hand	Right-arm medium	n/a
Lameck Onyango	22 September 1973	Right hand	Right arm medium	(Kenya) Swamibapa, Nairobi
Kennedy Otieno (wk)	11 March 1972	Right hand	Wicket-keeper	(Kenya) Ruaraka, Nairobi
Brijal Patel	14 November 1977	Right hand	Slow left-arm	(Kenya) Premier, Nairobi
Martin Suji	2 June 1971	Right hand	Right-arm medium-fast	(Kenya) Aga Khan, Nairobi
David Tikolo	27 December 1964	Right hand	Right-arm medium	
Steve Tikolo	25 June 1971	Right hand	Right arm Offbreak	(Kenya) Swamibapa, Nairobi

== Netherlands ==
Player	Date of birth	Batting style	Bowling style	First-class team
Steven Lubbers (c)	24 March 1953	Right hand	Right-arm off-break	(Netherlands) Hermes DVS
Flavian Aponso	28 October 1952	Left hand	Right-arm offbreak	(Sri Lanka) Sebastianites CAC
Paul-Jan Bakker	19 September 1957	Right hand	Right-arm medium-fast	(Netherlands) Quick Den Haag
Peter Cantrell	28 October 1962	Right hand	Right-arm offbreak	(Netherlands) SV Kampong
Nolan Clarke	22 June 1948	Right hand	Legbreak googly	(Netherlands) Sparta 1888
Eric Gouka	29 January 1970	Right hand	Right-arm medium	(Netherlands) Excelsior'20
Floris Jansen	10 June 1962	Right hand	Right-arm medium	(Netherlands) SV Kampong
Tim de Leede	25 January 1968	Right hand	Right-arm medium	(Netherlands) Voorburg
Roland Lefebvre	7 February 1963	Right arm	Right–arm medium	(England) Glamorgan
Klaas-Jan van Noortwijk	10 July 1970	Right hand	Right-arm medium	(Netherlands) VOC
Robert van Oosterom	16 October 1968	Right hand	-	(Netherlands) HBS
Marcel Schewe (wk)	10 March 1969	Right hand	Wicket-keeper	(Netherlands) Excelsior'20
Reinout Scholte (wk)	10 August 1967	Right hand	Wicket-keeper	(Netherlands) HBS
Bas Zuiderent	3 March 1977	Right hand	Right arm medium	(Netherlands) VOC

== New Zealand ==
Coach: (New Zealand) Glenn Turner

- Oldest Player: Dipak Patel (37y 108d)
- Youngest Player : Stephen Fleming (22y 315d)
- Average age : 27y 14d

Player	Date of birth	Age	Matches before 1996 WC	WC Matches before 1996 WC	Batting style	Bowling style	First-class team
Lee Germon (c/wk)	4 November 1968	27y 98d	13	0	Right hand	Right arm leg break Wicket-keeper	(New Zealand) Canterbury
Nathan Astle	15 September 1971	24y 148d	17	0	Right hand	Right arm medium	(New Zealand) Canterbury
Chris Cairns	13 June 1970	25y 242d	38	5	Right hand	Right arm fast-medium	(New Zealand) Canterbury
Stephen Fleming	1 April 1973	22y 315d	37	0	Left hand	Right arm offbreak	(New Zealand) Canterbury
Chris Harris	20 November 1969	26y 82d	58	9	Left hand	Right arm medium	(New Zealand) Canterbury
Robert Kennedy	3 June 1972	23y 52d	2	0	Right hand	Right arm medium	(New Zealand) Otago
Gavin Larsen	27 September 1962	33y 136d	76	9	Right hand	Right arm medium	(New Zealand) Wellington
Danny Morrison	3 February 1966	30y 7d	86	6	Right hand	Right-arm fast-medium	(New Zealand) Auckland
Dion Nash	20 November 1971	24y 82d	22	0	Right hand	Right-arm fast medium	(New Zealand) Northern Districts
Adam Parore	23 January 1971	25y 18d	45	0	Right hand	Wicket-keeper	(New Zealand) Auckland
Dipak Patel	25 October 1958	37y 108d	56	15	Right-hand	Right arm off-break	(New Zealand) Auckland
Craig Spearman	4 July 1972	23y 221d	7	0	Right-hand	–	(New Zealand) Central Districts
Shane Thomson	27 January 1969	27y 14d	48	0	Right hand	Right-arm off-break Right-arm fast-medium	(New Zealand) Northern Districts
Roger Twose	17 April 1968	27y 299d	12	0	Left hand	Right-arm medium pace	(New Zealand) Wellington

== Pakistan ==
- Oldest Player : Javed Miandad (38y 243d)
- Youngest Player : Saqlain Mushtaq (19y 43d)
- Average age: 27y 197d

Player	Date of birth	Age	Matches before 1996 WC	WC Matches before 1996 WC	Batting style	Bowling style	First-class team
Wasim Akram (c)	3 June 1966	29y 252d	193	17	Left hand	Left-arm fast	(Pakistan) PIA
Aamer Sohail(vc)	14 September 1966	29y 149d	85	10	Left hand	Slow left-arm orthodox	(Pakistan) Allied Bank Limited
Aaqib Javed	5 August 1972	23y 189d	121	10	Right hand	Right-arm fast-medium	(Pakistan) Allied Bank Limited
Ata-ur-Rehman	28 March 1975	20y 319d	25	0	Right hand	Right-arm fast-medium	(Pakistan) Allied Bank Limited
Ijaz Ahmed	20 September 1968	27y 143d	121	14	Right hand	Left-arm medium	(Pakistan) Habib Bank
Inzamam-ul-Haq	3 March 1970	25y 344d	96	10	Right hand	Slow left-arm orthodox	(Pakistan) Faisalabad
Javed Miandad	12 June 1957	38y 243d	228	28	Right hand	Right-arm legbreak	(Pakistan) Habib Bank
Mushtaq Ahmed	28 June 1970	25y 227	90	9	Right hand	Right arm leg-break	(Pakistan) Multan
Rameez Raja	14 August 1962	33y 180d	170	15	Right hand	Right arm leg-break	(Pakistan) Lahore
Rashid Latif (wk)	14 October 1968	27y 119d	70	0	Right hand	Wicket-keeper; Right hand leg break	(Pakistan) Karachi
Saeed Anwar	6 September 1968	27y 158d	82	0	Left-hand	Slow left-arm orthodox	(Pakistan) National Bank
Saleem Malik	16 April 1963	32y 300d	214	17	Right hand	Right arm off-break Slow right-arm medium	(Pakistan) Lahore
Saqlain Mushtaq	29 December 1976	19y 43d	5	0	Right hand	Right arm off break	Pakistan Intl. Airlines
Waqar Younis	16 November 1971	24y 86d	112	0	Right hand	Right-arm fast	(Pakistan) United Bank Limited

== South Africa ==
Coach: (England) Bob Woolmer

Player	Date of birth	Matches	Batting style	Bowling style	First-class team
Hansie Cronje (c)	25 September 1969	77	Right hand	Right arm medium	(South Africa) Free State
Paul Adams	20 January 1977	3	Right hand	Left-arm wrist spin	(South Africa) Western Province
Daryl Cullinan	4 March 1967	41	Right hand	Right arm off break	(South Africa) Transvaal
Fanie de Villiers	13 October 1964	62	Right hand	Right-arm fast medium	(South Africa) Northern Transvaal
Allan Donald	20 October 1966	57	Right hand	Right arm fast	(England) Warwickshire
Andrew Hudson	17 March 1965	60	Right hand	Right-arm medium	(South Africa) KwaZulu-Natal
Jacques Kallis	16 October 1975	7	Right hand	Right arm fast-medium	(South Africa) Western Province
Gary Kirsten	23 November 1967	35	Left hand	Right arm off break	(South Africa) Western Province
Craig Matthews	15 February 1965	43	Right hand	Right-arm fast-medium	(South Africa) Western Province
Brian McMillan	22 December 1963	48	Right hand	Right-arm medium-fast	(South Africa) Western Province
Steve Palframan (wk)	12 May 1970	1	Right hand	Wicket-keeper	(South Africa) Boland
Shaun Pollock	16 July 1973	7	Right hand	Right arm fast-medium	(England) Warwickshire
Jonty Rhodes	27 July 1969	76	Right hand	Right-arm medium	(South Africa) KwaZulu-Natal
Pat Symcox	14 April 1960	19	Right hand	Right-arm offbreak	(South Africa) KwaZulu-Natal

== Sri Lanka ==
Coach: (Australia) Dav Whatmore

Oldest Player: Arjuna Ranatunga (32y 79d)

Youngest Player: Ravindra Pushpakumara (20y 204d)

Average player age: 26y 141d

Player !	Date of birth	Matches	Batting style	Bowling style	First-class team
Arjuna Ranatunga (c)	1 December 1963	178	Left-hand	Right-hand medium	(Sri Lanka) Sinhalese SC
Aravinda de Silva (vc)	17 October 1965	175	Right hand	Right-arm off-break	(Sri Lanka) Nondescripts
Upul Chandana	7 May 1972	5	Right hand	Right-arm leg-break	(Sri Lanka) Tamil Union C&AC
Marvan Atapattu	22 November 1970	7	Right hand	Right arm leg spin	(Sri Lanka) Sinhalese SC
Kumar Dharmasena	24 April 1971	27	Right hand	Right-arm offbreak	(Sri Lanka) Bloomfield
Asanka Gurusinha	16 September 1966	128	Left-hand	Right-arm medium	(Sri Lanka) Nondescripts
Romesh Kaluwitharana (wk)	24 November 1969	40	Right hand	Wicket-keeper; Right-arm medium	(Sri Lanka) Sebastianites
Sanath Jayasuriya	30 June 1969	99	Left hand	Slow left arm orthodox	(Sri Lanka) Bloomfield
Roshan Mahanama	31 May 1966	136	Right-hand	-	(Sri Lanka) Bloomfield
Muttiah Muralitharan	17 April 1972	35	Right hand	Right-arm off break	(Sri Lanka) Tamil Union
Ravindra Pushpakumara	21 July 1975	18	Right hand	Right-arm fast-medium	(Sri Lanka) Colts CC
Hashan Tillakaratne	14 July 1967	123	Left hand	-	(Sri Lanka) Nondescripts
Chaminda Vaas	27 January 1974	41	Left Hand	Left arm fast medium	(Sri Lanka) Colts CC
Pramodya Wickramasinghe	14 August 1971	76	Right hand	Right-arm fast	(Sri Lanka) Burgher RC

== United Arab Emirates ==
Players	Date of birth	Matches	Batting style	Bowling style
Sultan Zarawani (c)	24 January 1961	2	Right hand	Right arm leg spin
Arshad Laeeq	28 November 1970	2	Right hand	Right-arm fast-medium
Azhar Saeed	25 December 1970	2	Left hand	Slow left-arm orthodox
Imtiaz Abbasi (wk)	9 June 1968	2	Right hand	Wicket-keeper
Mazhar Hussain	25 October 1967	2	Right hand	Right-arm leg break
Mohammad Aslam	7 September 1961	0	Right hand	Right-arm fast
Mohammad Ishaq	7 March 1963	2	Right hand	Right-arm medium
Vijay Mehra	17 October 1963	2	Right hand	-
Ganesh Mylvaganam	1 August 1966	0	Right hand	-
Saeed-Al-Saffar	31 July 1968	0	Left hand	Left-arm fast-medium
Saleem Raza	5 July 1964	2	Right hand	Right-arm offbreak
Johanne Samarasekera	22 February 1968	2	Right hand	Right-arm medium-fast
Shaukat Dukanwala	21 January 1957	0	Right hand	Right-arm Offbreak
Shehzad Altaf	6 October 1957	0	Right hand	Right-arm medium

== West Indies ==
Coach: (Cricket West Indies) Andy Roberts

Player	Date of birth	Matches	Batting style	Bowling style	First-class team
Richie Richardson (c)	12 January 1962	218	Right hand	Right-arm medium-pace	(South Africa) Northern Transvaal
Jimmy Adams	9 January 1968	50	Left hand	Slow left arm orthodox	Jamaica
Curtly Ambrose	21 September 1963	122	Left hand	Right-arm fast	(Antigua and Barbuda) Leeward Islands
Keith Arthurton	21 February 1965	81	Left hand	Slow left-arm orthodox leg break	(Antigua and Barbuda) Leeward Islands
Ian Bishop	24 October 1967	66	Right-handed	Right-arm fast	Trinidad and Tobago
Courtney Browne (wk)	7 December 1970	13	Right hand	Wicket-keeper	Barbados
Sherwin Campbell	1 January 1970	22	Right hand	Right-arm medium pace	Barbados
Shivnarine Chanderpaul	16 August 1974	18	Left hand	Right-arm leg break	Guyana
Cameron Cuffy	8 February 1970	9	Right hand	Right-arm fast	(Saint Vincent and the Grenadines) Windward Islands
Ottis Gibson	16 March 1969	10	Right hand	Right arm fast	Barbados
Roger Harper	17 March 1963	93	Right hand	Right-arm off break	Guyana
Roland Holder	22 December 1967	18	Right hand	Right-arm medium pace	Barbados
Brian Lara	2 May 1969	92	Left hand	Right-arm leg break	Trinidad and Tobago
Courtney Walsh	30 October 1962	150	Right hand	Right-arm medium fast	Jamaica
Phil Simmons	18 April 1963	111	Right hand	Right-arm medium	Trinidad and Tobago

== Zimbabwe ==
Player	Date of birth	Matches	Batting style	Bowling style	First-class team
Andy Flower (c/wk)	28 April 1968	39	Left-hand	Wicket-keeper Right-arm off break	(Zimbabwe) Mashonaland
Eddo Brandes	5 March 1963	27	Right-hand	Right arm fast	(Zimbabwe) Mashonaland
Alistair Campbell	23 September 1972	31	Left hand	Right-arm off break	(Zimbabwe) Manicaland
Sean Davies	15 October 1973	3	Left hand	Right-arm medium-fast	(Zimbabwe) Mashonaland
Craig Evans	29 November 1969	7	Right hand	Right-arm medium	(Zimbabwe) Matabeleland
Grant Flower	20 December 1970	29	Right hand	Slow left arm orthodox	(Zimbabwe) Mashonaland
Charlie Lock	10 September 1962	2	Right hand	Right-arm fast-medium	(Zimbabwe) Mashonaland
Henry Olonga	3 July 1976	2	Right hand	Right-arm fast	(Zimbabwe) Matabeleland
Stephen Peall	2 September 1969	16	Left hand	Right-arm offbreak	(Zimbabwe) Mashonaland
Bryan Strang	9 June 1972	6	Right hand	Left-arm medium	(Zimbabwe) Mashonaland
Paul Strang	28 July 1970	12	Right hand	Right-arm leg break	(Zimbabwe) Mashonaland
Heath Streak	16 March 1974	21	Right hand	Right-arm fast-medium	(Zimbabwe) Matabeleland
Andy Waller	25 September 1959	24	Right hand	Right-arm medium	(Zimbabwe) Mashonaland
Guy Whittall	5 September 1972	20	Right hand	Right-arm medium	(Zimbabwe) Mashonaland
