= Netherlands cricket team in Kenya in 1996 =

Netherlands national cricket team tour

The Netherlands national cricket team toured Kenya In December 1996 and played five limited overs matches against Kenyan teams. The touring Dutch team was captained by Tim de Leede.

== Matches ==
12 December 1996
Scorecard

Netherlands; 154/7 (50 overs)	v	Kenya; 155/5 (44 overs)
Tim de Leede 37*; Aasif Karim 3/7 (10 overs)		Maurice Odumbe 46; Tim de Leede 2/10 (5 overs)

Kenya won by 5 wickets
Gymkhana Club Ground, Nairobi

- Toss not known

14 December 1996
Scorecard

Netherlands; 168/7 (50 overs)	v	Kenya; 169/9 (49 overs)
Peter Cantrell 49; Aasif Karim 3/17 (10 overs)		Martin Suji 60*; Floris Jansen 3/28 (10 overs)

Kenya won by 1 wicket
Gymkhana Club Ground, Nairobi
Umpires: A. Gosh and Makbul Jaffer

- Toss not known

16 December 1996
Scorecard

Netherlands; 231/4 (50 overs)	v	Kenya; 233/6 (49 overs)
Peter Cantrell 95*; Brijal Patel 1/31 (10 overs)		Kennedy Otieno 87; Steven Lubbers 3/33 (10 overs)

Kenya won by 4 wickets
Simba Union Ground, Nairobi
Umpires: Y. Cockat and Abdul Sattar Moughal

- Toss not known

17 December 1996
Scorecard

Kenya; 234/7 (45 overs)	v	Netherlands; 225/8 (45 overs)
Dipak Chudasama 46; Peter Cantrell 3/25 (5 overs)		Nolan Clarke 73; David Tikolo 2/26 (9 overs)

Kenya won by 9 runs
Gymkhana Club Ground, Nairobi
Umpires: Subhash Modi and Abdul Sattar Moughal

- Toss not known
- The match was reduced to 45 overs per side

18 December 1996
Scorecard

Netherlands; 211 (44 overs)	v	Nairobi Provincial Cricket Association XI; 142 (42 overs)
Klaas-Jan van Noortwijk 80; Alfred Njuguna 5/42 (9 overs)		Tariq Iqbal 44; Eric Gouka 3/12 (3 overs)

Netherlands won by 69 runs
Ruaraka Sports Club Ground, Nairobi
Umpires: A. Gosh and P. Khoda

- Toss not known
