= ABN AMRO Trophy =

International cricket tournament

- Cricket format: Limited overs cricket
- Tournament format(s): Round-robin and Final
- Host(s): Kenya
- Champions: Netherlands
- Participants: 3
- Matches: 14 to 24 December 1994

The ABN AMRO Trophy was a three team limited overs cricket tournament held in Kenya during the 1994–95 season between associate cricket nations in preparation for their participation at the upcoming 1996 Cricket World Cup.

== Points table ==
Place	Team	Played	Won	Lost	Points
1	Kenya	4	3	1	6
2	Netherlands	4	2	2	4
3	United Arab Emirates	4	1	3	2

== Group matches ==
=== 1st match ===
14 December 1994

Kenya	v	United Arab Emirates

Kenya won
Aga Khan Sports Club Ground, Nairobi

- Precise result not known

=== 2nd match ===
15 December 1994
Scorecard

United Arab Emirates; 188 (49 overs)	v	Netherlands; 189/4 (49.1 overs)
Mazhar Hussain 53; Floris Jansen 5/31 (10 overs)		Peter Cantrell 56; Saleem Raza 2/34 (10 overs)

Netherlands won by 6 wickets
Nairobi Club Ground, Nairobi

- United Arab Emirates won the toss and decided to bat

=== 3rd match ===
17 December 1994
Scorecard

Netherlands; 268/4 (50 overs)	v	Kenya; 260/9 (50 overs)
Peter Cantrell 109; Maurice Odumbe 1/43 (8 overs)		Maurice Odumbe 67; Peter Cantrell 2/36 (9 overs)

Netherlands won by 8 runs
Ruaraka Sports Club Ground, Nairobi

- Netherlands won the toss and decided to bat

=== 4th match ===
18 December 1994

Kenya	v	United Arab Emirates

Kenya won
Gymkhana Club Ground, Nairobi

- Precise result not known

=== 5th match ===
20 December 1994
Scorecard

Netherlands; 221/8 (50 overs)	v	United Arab Emirates; 222/7 (49.1 overs)
Tim de Leede 104; Assadullah Mirza 4/42 (10 overs)		Mohammad Ishaq 66*; Flavian Aponso 2/27 (10 overs)

United Arab Emirates won by 3 wickets
Sir Ali Muslim Club Ground, Nairobi

- Netherlands won the toss and decided to bat

=== 6th match ===
22 December 1994
Scorecard

Kenya; 276/6 (50 overs)	v	Netherlands; 241 (47.3 overs)
Steve Tikolo 148*; Peter Cantrell 3/72 (10 overs)		Flavian Aponso 53; Thomas Odoyo 2/52 (8 overs)

Kenya won by 35 runs
Simba Union Ground, Nairobi

- Kenya won the toss and decided to bat

== Final ==
Kenya chose to bat in front of a 3,000 person home crowd but started poorly, slumping to 50/4. A partnership between Steve Tikolo and Maurice Odumbe helped resurrect the Kenyan innings to a relatively respectable 161, losing their last wicket after 47 overs. Dutch bowler Floris Jansen took four wickets for twenty runs. The Netherlands started their innings well, led by Peter Cantrell who scored 68 not out on the way to chase down the target after 39 overs. Jansen was awarded the Man of the Match for his bowling.

24 December 1994
Scorecard

Kenya; 161 (41.3 overs)	v	Netherlands; 165/4 (39 overs)
Steve Tikolo 52; Floris Jansen 4/20 (8 overs)		Peter Cantrell 68*; Aasif Karim 2/32 (9 overs)

Netherlands won by 6 wickets
Gymkhana Club Ground, Nairobi
Player of the match: Floris Jansen (NED)

- Kenya won the toss and decided to bat
