= Dutch cricket team in India in 1994–95 =

Netherlands national cricket team tour

The Netherlands national cricket team toured India in March 1995 and played six matches against teams representing various areas of India. The touring Dutch team was captained by Steven Lubbers.

== Matches ==
13 March 1995
Scorecard

Netherlands; 252/6 (43 overs)	v	Himachal Pradesh; 231/3 (43 overs)
Tim de Leede 74*; Surinder Singh 2/52 (9 overs)		Nischal Gaur 95; Eric Gouka 2/35 (8 overs)

Netherlands won by 21 runs
Indira Gandhi Stadium, Una

- Toss not known
- The match was reduced to 43 overs per side

16 March 1995
Scorecard

Netherlands; 233/4 (45 overs)	v	Railways; 236/2 (38.5 overs)
Flavian Aponso 90; A Jadeja 2/38 (9 overs)		A Jadeja 67*; Flavian Aponso 1/34 (8 overs)

Railways won by 8 wickets
Karnail Singh Stadium, New Delhi

- Toss not known
- 45 over per innings match

19 March 1995
Scorecard

Netherlands; 125 (40.1 overs)	v	Haryana; 127/2 (24.3 overs)
Robert van Oosterom 50; Pradeep Jain 2/13 (7 overs)		Vijay Yadav 71; Eric Gouka 1/18 (3 overs)

Haryana won by 8 wickets
Nahar Singh Stadium, Faridabad

- Toss not known

21 March 1995
Scorecard

Netherlands; 284/7 (45 overs)	v	Delhi; 248/8 (45 overs)
Steven Lubbers 118; Robin Singh Jr. 2/48 (9 overs)		Bantoo Singh 83; Edward Sleijffers 3/41 (9 overs)

Netherlands won by 36 runs
Feroz Shah Kotla, Delhi

- Netherlands won the toss and decided to bat
- 45 over per innings match

23 March 1995
Scorecard

Netherlands; 174 (42.4 overs)	v	Delhi; 177/4 (42.4 overs)
Tim de Leede 55; J Sharma 4/16 (8 overs)		Rajneesh Chopra 68; Steven Lubbers 2/31 (9 overs)

Delhi won by 6 wickets
Feroz Shah Kotla, Delhi

- Netherlands won the toss and decided to bat
- 45 over per innings match

25 March 1995
Scorecard

Netherlands; 180/8 (45 overs)	v	Services; 169/8 (39.5 overs)
Nolan Clarke 65; Harish Bhaskar 3/22 (9 overs)		Deepak Ahuja 31; Steven Lubbers 3/24 (7.5 overs)

Match abandoned
Palam A Ground, Delhi

- Toss not known
- A sand storm caused the match to be abandoned
- 45 over per innings match
