= Paul-Jan Bakker =

Dutch cricketer

Personal information
- Full name: Paul-Jan Bakker
- Born: 19 August 1957 (age 69); Vlaardingen, South Holland, Netherlands
- Nickname: Nip
- Batting: Right-handed
- Bowling: Right-arm medium-fast

International information
- National side: Netherlands (1996)
- ODI debut (cap 2): 17 February 1996 v New Zealand
- Last ODI: 5 March 1996 v South Africa

Domestic team information
- Years: Team
- 1986–1992: Hampshire

Career statistics
Competition	ODI	FC	LA
Matches	5	69	68
Runs scored	1	333	59
Batting average	–	9.51	8.42
100s/50s	–/–	–/–	–/–
Top score	1*	22	14
Balls bowled	258	11,525	3,377
Wickets	3	193	80
Bowling average	71.66	28.01	28.27
5 wickets in innings	–	7	2
10 wickets in match	–	–	–
Best bowling	2/51	7/31	5/17
Catches/stumpings	–/–	9/–	4/–
- Source: Cricinfo, 14 May 2017

Paul-Jan Bakker (born 19 August 1957) is a Dutch former international cricketer, who also played domestic cricket at first-class and List A one-day level in England for Hampshire from 1986 to 1992, taking 269 wickets across both formats. He later played in the Netherlands inaugural One Day International match in the 1996 World Cup, before retiring shortly after the tournament. In 2007, he briefly succeeded Peter Cantrell as Netherlands coach.

== Early life ==
The son of Hubertus Antonius Bakker and his wife, Wilhelmina Hendrika, Bakker was born in Vlaardingen on 19 August 1957. He was educated at the Hugo De Groot Scholengemeenschap in The Hague. Bakker played his club cricket in the Netherlands for Quick Hagg Cricket Club in the Hoofdklasse; he had previously completed his National Service and played four seasons of club cricket in South Africa for the Green Point Cricket Club in Cape Town, whilst spending the winters working at ski resorts in the Swiss Alps, where he organised ski holidays.

Bakker came to England in the summer of 1985, on the recommendation of the cricketer David Turner who had spotted him playing in South Africa, to play for Southampton-based Old Tauntonians in the Southern League, impressing enough to secure a trial with Hampshire and earning him a one-year contract for the 1986 season.

== Cricket career ==
=== County cricket ===
The following year, Bakker made his debut in first-class cricket (the third Dutchman to play first-class cricket after Carst Posthuma in 1903 and Bill Glerum in 1957) against the touring Indians at Southampton, with his first wicket being Sunil Gavaskar, caught by Rajesh Maru from Bakker's third delivery in first-class cricket. After playing a second match against Cambridge University, he made history becoming the first Dutchman to play in the County Championship, when he played against Gloucestershire at Bournemouth in May. He also made his debut in List A one-day cricket against the Combined Universities at Oxford in the 1986 Benson & Hedges Cup.

The month after his County Championship debut, Bakker played for the Netherlands in the ICC Trophy, playing all eight of their matches in the tournament, where the Netherlands missed out on qualification for the 1987 World Cup after losing to Zimbabwe in the final. Bakker made an immediate impact in the tournament, taking 5 wickets for 18 runs in his first match against Papua New Guinea; he finished the tournament with 21 wickets, with only teammate Ronnie Elferink and the Dane Ole Mortensen taking more. He was retained by Hampshire after the season.

Bakker found himself out of the first team at the start of the 1987 season, but was recalled at the end of July following injuries to Steve Andrew and Kevan James. He played three first-class and one-day matches apiece in 1987, claiming his first five-wicket haul in first-class cricket with 7 for 31 against Kent. By the end of the following season, he had established himself in the Hampshire side; in the 1988 season he made ten first-class appearances, taking 30 wickets at an average of 22.33. Alongside these he made seven one-day appearances, taking 17 wickets at 12.58, and took his first five wicket haul in the format with 5 for 26 against Derbyshire in the Refuge Assurance League.

His best season for Hampshire came in the 1989 season, when Bakker was their leading first-class wicket-taker with 77 from 21 matches, averaging 22.49 and taking five wickets or more four times; he was the seventh-highest wicket-taker in first-class cricket in England that year. He also had success in one-day cricket, taking 24 wickets at an average of 23.19 from 20 appearances, including one five wicket haul. His performances for Hampshire in 1989 earned him the Hampshire Press Cricketer of the Year award, and gained him his county cap. His one-day form continued with the Netherlands in 1989, with him playing in a 50-over match against a strong touring Australian side at The Hague; his wickets included Mark Taylor and Dean Jones, who had both just dominated the English bowlers in the Ashes Test match series.

The following season, Bakker made 16 first-class appearances, taking 37 wickets; however, in contrast to the previous season his average was high, increasing to 38.89, and he took only one five-wicket haul. His one-day bowling, however, remained consistent, with 17 wickets at 32.23. During the 1990 season, he made his second appearance in the ICC Trophy, playing two matches, one each against Kenya and Zimbabwe. For Hampshire, Bakker found his opportunities limited in 1991 and 1992 in both first-class and one-day cricket. In the 1991 season, he made ten appearances apiece in both formats, taking 20 wickets at 32.75 in first-class cricket, and 8 wickets at 43.37 in one-day cricket. The following season, he made six first-class appearances, taking 11 wickets at 40.09, whilst in four one-day matches he took just one wicket.

After suffering from a serious neck injury in 1992, Bakker was released by Hampshire prior to the start of the 1993 season, alongside Bobby Parks. Bakker took 193 wickets for Hampshire in 69 first-class matches at an average of 28.01; he took seven five wicket hauls and had best figures of 7 for 31. In one-day cricket, he took 76 wickets in 62 one-day matches at an average of 26.19; he took two five wicket hauls, with best figures of 5 for 17. He often opened the bowling with Malcolm Marshall, and Bakker was described as having a "probing line and length" by the cricket writer Tim Brooks.

=== World Cup appearance ===
Following the end of his county cricket career, Bakker returned to the Netherlands and continued to play for Quick Haag, though it was noted his bowling had lost some pace by this point. Bakker was selected in the Netherlands squad for the 1996 World Cup in the Indian subcontinent, playing in the Netherlands' first-ever One Day International (ODI) during the tournament against New Zealand at Vadodara at the age of 38. He took two wickets in the match, those of Chris Harris and Dipak Patel. He played all five of the Netherlands matches during the tournament, but took just one further wicket in these matches. His solitary ODI run came as a result of an umpiring error against the United Arab Emirates, when Bakker and Robert van Oosterom scampered a bye off the final ball of the Dutch innings, but the bye was not signalled by the umpire and so was credited as a run to Bakker.

Bakker made one final appearance for the Netherlands following the World Cup, in the 1st Round of the 1996 NatWest Trophy against Surrey, after which he retired. For the Netherlands, he played 51 matches over a thirteen-year period, having debuted in a minor match against the Marylebone Cricket Club (MCC) in 1983; he took 161 wickets for them across all cricket, at an average of exactly 13.

== Post-retirement ==
After his retirement, Bakker spent most of his time living in Switzerland, but also spent time in Sint Maarten. Following the 2007 World Cup, he was appointed Netherlands coach on a temporary basis, replacing outgoing coach Peter Cantrell. He coached the Netherlands for their first three matches of the 2007–08 ICC Intercontinental Cup, prior to the appointment of Peter Drinnen in January 2008. Bakker remains a keen cricket spectator and is involved with the touring CTC de Flamingo’s, who played the MCC at Lord's in 2017. He is the holder of a private pilot's licence.

== Works cited ==
- Brooks, Tim (2016). Cricket on the Continent. Worthing: Pitch Publishing. ISBN 978-1-7853-1265-6.
