= 1996 Cricket World Cup =

6th Cricket World Cup

- Dates: 14 February – 17 March 1996
- Administrator: International Cricket Council
- Cricket format: One Day International
- Tournament format(s): Round robin and Knockout
- Hosts: Pakistan; India; Sri Lanka
- Champions: Sri Lanka (1st title)
- Runners-up: Australia
- Participants: 12
- Matches: 37
- Player of the series: (Sri Lanka) Sanath Jayasuriya
- Most runs: (India) Sachin Tendulkar (523)
- Most wickets: (India) Anil Kumble (15)

The 1996 Cricket World Cup, also called the Wills World Cup 1996 for sponsorship reasons, was the sixth Cricket World Cup organised by the International Cricket Council (ICC). It was co-hosted by Pakistan, India and Sri Lanka. The tournament was won by Sri Lanka, who defeated Australia by seven wickets in the final on 17 March 1996 at the Gaddafi Stadium in Lahore, Pakistan.

== Hosts ==
Venues in India
Venues in Pakistan
Venues in Sri Lanka

The competition was played in India, Pakistan and Sri Lanka. India hosted 17 matches at 17 venues, Pakistan hosted 16 matches at six venues and four matches were played at three Sri Lankan venues

Australia and the West Indies refused to send their teams to Sri Lanka following the bombing of Central Bank in Colombo by the Tamil Tigers in January 1996. After extensive negotiations, the ICC ruled that Sri Lanka would be awarded both games on forfeit.

=== India ===
Venues	Cities	Capacity	Matches
Eden Gardens	Calcutta, West Bengal	120,000	1
Green Park	Kanpur, Uttar Pradesh	45,000	1
Punjab Cricket Association Stadium	Mohali, Punjab	40,000	1
M. Chinnaswamy Stadium	Bangalore, Karnataka	55,000	1
M. A. Chidambaram Stadium	Madras, Tamil Nadu	50,000	1
Lal Bahadur Shastri Stadium	Hyderabad, Telangana	30,000	1
Barabati Stadium	Cuttack, Odisha	25,000	1
Roop Singh Stadium	Gwalior, Madhya Pradesh	55,000	1
Indira Priyadarshini Stadium	Visakhapatnam, Andhra Pradesh	25,000	1
Moin-ul-Haq Stadium	Patna, Bihar	25,000	1
Nehru Stadium	Pune, Maharashtra	25,000	1
Wankhede Stadium	Mumbai, Maharashtra	45,000	1
Sardar Patel Stadium	Ahmedabad, Gujarat	48,000	1
IPCL Sports Complex Ground	Vadodara, Gujarat	20,000	1
Sawai Mansingh Stadium	Jaipur, Rajasthan	30,000	1
Vidarbha C.A. Ground	Nagpur, Maharashtra	40,000	1
Feroz Shah Kotla Ground	Delhi, New Delhi	48,000	1

=== Pakistan ===
Venues	Cities	Capacity	Matches
National Stadium	Karachi, Sindh	34,000	3
Gaddafi Stadium	Lahore, Punjab	62,000	4
Rawalpindi Cricket Stadium	Rawalpindi, Punjab	25,000	3
Arbab Niaz Stadium	Peshawar, Khyber Pakhtunkhwa	20,000	2
Iqbal Stadium	Faisalabad, Punjab	18,000	3
Jinnah Stadium	Gujranwala, Punjab	20,000	1

=== Sri Lanka ===
Venues	Cities	Capacity	Matches
R. Premadasa Stadium	Colombo	14,000	0*
Singhalese Sports Club Cricket Ground	Colombo	10,000	1
Asgiriya Stadium	Kandy	10,300	1

- Two matches were scheduled to be played down at the Premadasa, but neither took place as Australia and the West Indies declined to play in Sri Lanka.

== Teams ==
All the Test-playing nations participated in the competition, including Zimbabwe, who became the ninth Test-status member of the ICC following the last World Cup. The three Associate teams (previously one) to qualify through the 1994 ICC Trophy – the United Arab Emirates, Kenya and the Netherlands – also made their World Cup debuts in 1996. The Netherlands lost all of their five matches, including a defeat to the UAE, while Kenya recorded a surprise victory over the West Indies in Pune.

Full Members
Australia	England	India
New Zealand	Pakistan	South Africa
Sri Lanka	West Indies	Zimbabwe
Associate Members
Kenya	Netherlands	United Arab Emirates

== Summary ==
The Sri Lankans, coached by Dav Whatmore and captained by Arjuna Ranatunga, used Man of the Series Sanath Jayasuriya and Romesh Kaluwitharana as opening batsmen to take advantage of the fielding restrictions during the first 15 overs of each innings. At a time when 50 or 60 runs in the first 15 overs was considered adequate, Sri Lanka scored 117 runs in those overs against India, 123 against Kenya, 121 against England in the quarter-final and 86 against India in the semi-final. Against Kenya, Sri Lanka made 398 for 5, a new record for the highest team score in a One Day International that stood until April 2006. Gary Kirsten scored 188 not out against United Arab Emirates at Rawalpindi, Pakistan, setting a record for the highest individual score in a World Cup match which stood until 2015.

Sri Lanka won the first semi-final over India at Eden Gardens in Calcutta, in front of a crowd unofficially estimated at 110,000. After they had lost both openers cheaply, Sri Lanka launched a counter-attack, led by Aravinda de Silva, to post a strong total of 251 for the loss of 8 wickets. India began their chase promisingly but after the loss of Sachin Tendulkar, the Indian batting order collapsed. After India had slumped to 120 for 8 in the 35th over, sections of the crowd began to throw fruit and plastic bottles onto the field. The players left the field for 20 minutes in an attempt to quieten the crowd. When the players returned for play, more bottles were thrown onto the field and fires were lit in the stand. Match referee Clive Lloyd awarded the match to Sri Lanka, the first default ever in a Test or One Day International.

In the second semi-final in Mohali, Australia recovered from 15/4 to reach 207/8 from their 50 overs. The West Indians had reached 165/2 in the 42nd over before losing their last eight wickets for 37 runs in 51 balls.

Sri Lanka won the toss in the final and sent Australia in to bat despite the team batting first having won all five previous World Cup finals. Mark Taylor top scored with 74 in Australia's total of 241/7. Sri Lanka won the match in the 47th over with Aravinda de Silva following his 3 for 42 with an unbeaten 107 to win the Player of the Match award. It was the first time a tournament host or co-host had won the cricket World Cup.

A warm-up match was played between South Africa and Pakistan on 8 February 1996 in which South Africa defeated Pakistan by 65 runs.

== Group stage ==
=== Group A ===
Pos	Team	Pld	W	L	T	NR	Pts	NRR
1	Sri Lanka	5	5	0	0	0	10	1.607
2	Australia	5	3	2	0	0	6	0.903
3	India	5	3	2	0	0	6	0.452
4	West Indies	5	2	3	0	0	4	−0.134
5	Zimbabwe	5	1	4	0	0	2	−0.939
6	Kenya	5	1	4	0	0	2	−1.007

Source: ESPNcricinfo

16 February
Scorecard

Zimbabwe; 151/9 (50 overs)	v	West Indies; 155/4 (29.3 overs)
Grant Flower 31 (54); Curtly Ambrose 3/28 (10 overs)		Sherwin Campbell 47 (88); Paul Strang 4/40 (7.3 overs)

West Indies won by 6 wickets
Lal Bahadur Shastri Stadium, Hyderabad
Umpires: Steve Dunne (NZ) and Srinivasaraghavan Venkataraghavan (Ind)
Player of the match: Curtly Ambrose (WI)

- Zimbabwe won the toss and elected to bat.

17 February
Scorecard

Sri Lanka	v	Australia

Sri Lanka won by a walkover
R. Premadasa Stadium, Colombo
Umpires: Cyril Mitchley (SA) and Mahboob Shah (Pak)

- No toss.
- Australia forfeited the match due to safety concerns, and were in Mumbai at the time of the match.

18 February
Scorecard

Kenya; 199/6 (50 overs)	v	India; 203/3 (41.5 overs)
Steve Tikolo 65 (83); Anil Kumble 3/28 (10 overs)		Sachin Tendulkar 127* (138); Steve Tikolo 1/26 (3 overs)

India won by 7 wickets
Barabati Stadium, Cuttack
Umpires: K. T. Francis (SL) and David Shepherd (Eng)
Player of the match: Sachin Tendulkar (Ind)

- India won the toss and elected to field.

21 February
Scorecard

Zimbabwe; 228/6 (50 overs)	v	Sri Lanka; 229/4 (37 overs)
Alistair Campbell 75 (102); Chaminda Vaas 2/30 (10 overs)		Aravinda de Silva 91 (86); Heath Streak 3/60 (10 overs)

Sri Lanka won by 6 wickets
Sinhalese Sports Club Ground, Colombo
Umpires: Steve Dunne (NZ) and Mahboob Shah (Pak)
Player of the match: Aravinda de Silva (SL)

- Zimbabwe won the toss and elected to bat.

21 February
Scorecard

West Indies; 173 (50 overs)	v	India; 174/5 (39.4 overs)
Richie Richardson 47 (70); Anil Kumble 3/35 (10 overs)		Sachin Tendulkar 70 (91); Roger Harper 2/34 (9 overs)

India won by 5 wickets
Captain Roop Singh Stadium, Gwalior
Umpires: Khizer Hayat (Pak) and Ian Robinson (Zim)
Player of the match: Sachin Tendulkar (Ind)

- West Indies won the toss and elected to bat.

23 February
Scorecard

Australia; 304/7 (50 overs)	v	Kenya; 207/7 (50 overs)
Mark Waugh 130 (128); Rajab Ali 3/45 (10 overs)		Kennedy Otieno 85 (137); Paul Reiffel 2/18 (7 overs)

Australia won by 97 runs
Indira Priyadarshini Stadium, Visakhapatnam
Umpires: Cyril Mitchley (SA) and David Shepherd (Eng)
Player of the match: Mark Waugh (Aus)

- Kenya won the toss and elected to field.

26 February
Scorecard

Sri Lanka	v	West Indies

Sri Lanka won by a walkover
Premadasa Stadium, Colombo
Umpires: V. K. Ramaswamy (Ind) and Mahboob Shah (Pak)

- No toss.
- West Indies forfeited the match due to safety concerns.

27 February
Scorecard

Kenya; 134 (49.4 overs)	v	Zimbabwe; 137/5 (42.2 overs)
Dipak Chudasama 34 (66); Paul Strang 5/21 (9.4 overs)		Grant Flower 45 (112); Rajab Ali 3/22 (8 overs)

Zimbabwe won by 5 wickets
Moin-ul-Haq Stadium, Patna
Umpires: Khizer Hayat (Pak) and Cyril Mitchley (SA)
Player of the match: Paul Strang (Zim)

- Zimbabwe won the toss and elected to field.
- This game was originally scheduled to be played on 25 February; as the game started but due to rain it was abandoned after 15.5 overs of Zimbabwe's innings.

27 February
Scorecard

Australia; 258 (50 overs)	v	India; 242 (48 overs)
Mark Waugh 126 (135); Venkatapathy Raju 2/48 (10 overs)		Sachin Tendulkar 90 (84); Damien Fleming 5/36 (9 overs)

Australia won by 16 runs
Wankhede Stadium, Mumbai
Umpires: Steve Dunne (NZ) and David Shepherd (Eng)
Player of the match: Mark Waugh (Aus)

- Australia won the toss and elected to bat.

29 February
Scorecard

Kenya; 166 (49.3 overs)	v	West Indies; 93 (35.2 overs)
Steve Tikolo 29 (50); Courtney Walsh 3/46 (9 overs)		Shivnarine Chanderpaul 19 (48); Maurice Odumbe 3/15 (10 overs)

Kenya won by 73 runs
Nehru Stadium, Pune
Umpires: Khizer Hayat (Pak) and V. K. Ramaswamy (Ind)
Player of the match: Maurice Odumbe (Ken)

- West Indies won the toss and elected to field.
- Kenya won their first ODI match.
- This was the first time the West Indies lost an ODI to an ICC Associate.
- This was the fourth win in ODI history by an ICC Associate (all in World Cups, SL vs Ind 1979, Zim vs Aus 1983 and Zim vs Eng 1992).

1 March
Scorecard

Zimbabwe; 154 (45.3 overs)	v	Australia; 158/2 (36 overs)
Andy Waller 67 (101); Shane Warne 4/34 (9.3 overs)		Mark Waugh 76* (109); Paul Strang 2/33 (10 overs)

Australia won by 8 wickets
Vidarbha Cricket Association Ground, Nagpur
Umpires: Steve Dunne (NZ) and David Shepherd (Eng)
Player of the match: Shane Warne (Aus)

- Zimbabwe won the toss and elected to bat.

2 March
Scorecard

India; 271/3 (50 overs)	v	Sri Lanka; 272/4 (48.4 overs)
Sachin Tendulkar 137 (137); Ravindra Pushpakumara 1/53 (8 overs)		Sanath Jayasuriya 79 (76); Anil Kumble 2/39 (10 overs)

Sri Lanka won by 6 wickets
Feroz Shah Kotla, Delhi
Umpires: Cyril Mitchley (SA) and Ian Robinson (Zim)
Player of the match: Sanath Jayasuriya (SL)

- Sri Lanka won the toss and elected to field.
- Manoj Prabhakar played his last ODI game.

4 March
Scorecard

Australia; 229/6 (50 overs)	v	West Indies; 232/6 (48.5 overs)
Ricky Ponting 102 (112); Courtney Walsh 2/35 (9 overs)		Richie Richardson 93* (133); Mark Waugh 3/38 (10 overs)

West Indies won by 4 wickets
Sawai Mansingh Stadium, Jaipur
Umpires: Mahboob Shah (Pak) and David Shepherd (Eng)
Player of the match: Richie Richardson (WI)

- Australia won the toss and elected to bat.

6 March
Scorecard

India; 247/5 (50 overs)	v	Zimbabwe; 207 (49.4 overs)
Vinod Kambli 106 (110); Charlie Lock 2/57 (10 overs)		Heath Streak 30 (39); Venkatapathy Raju 3/30 (10 overs)

India won by 40 runs
Green Park, Kanpur
Umpires: Steve Bucknor (WI) and Cyril Mitchley (SA)
Player of the match: Ajay Jadeja (Ind)

- Zimbabwe won the toss and elected to field.

6 March
Scorecard

Sri Lanka; 398/5 (50 overs)	v	Kenya; 254/7 (50 overs)
Aravinda de Silva 145 (115); Tito Odumbe 2/34 (5 overs)		Steve Tikolo 96 (95); Arjuna Ranatunga 2/31 (5 overs)

Sri Lanka won by 144 runs
Asgiriya Stadium, Kandy
Umpires: Steve Dunne (NZ) and V. K. Ramaswamy (Ind)
Player of the match: Aravinda de Silva (SL)

- Kenya won the toss and elected to field.
- Sri Lanka's total of 398/5 surpassed England's 363/7 against Pakistan in 1992 as the highest score in all ODIs. The record stood until 12 March 2006, when both Australia and South Africa broke it in the same match. It remained a World Cup record until the 2007 tournament, when India scored 413/5 against Bermuda.

=== Group B ===
Pos	Team	Pld	W	L	T	NR	Pts	NRR
1	South Africa	5	5	0	0	0	10	2.043
2	Pakistan	5	4	1	0	0	8	0.961
3	New Zealand	5	3	2	0	0	6	0.552
4	England	5	2	3	0	0	4	0.079
5	United Arab Emirates	5	1	4	0	0	2	−1.830
6	Netherlands	5	0	5	0	0	0	−1.923

Source: ESPNcricinfo

14 February
Scorecard

New Zealand; 239/6 (50 overs)	v	England; 228/9 (50 overs)
Nathan Astle 101 (132); Graeme Hick 2/45 (9 overs)		Graeme Hick 85 (102); Dion Nash 3/26 (7 overs)

New Zealand won by 11 runs
Gujarat Stadium, Motera, Ahmedabad
Umpires: B. C. Cooray and Steve Randell
Player of the match: Nathan Astle (NZ)

16 February
Scorecard

South Africa; 321/2 (50 overs)	v	United Arab Emirates; 152/8 (50 overs)
Gary Kirsten 188* (159); Johanne Samarasekera 1/39 (9 overs)		Arshad Laeeq 43 (79); Brian McMillan 3/11 (8 overs)

South Africa won by 169 runs
Rawalpindi Cricket Stadium, Rawalpindi
Umpires: Steve Bucknor and V. K. Ramaswamy
Player of the match: Gary Kirsten (SA)

- Match was delayed from 15 February due to rain and a flooded ground.
- Gary Kirsten's unbeaten 188 was the highest ever individual score in a World Cup match, surpassing Viv Richards' 181* against Sri Lanka in 1987, and the second-highest ODI score of all time, one short of Richards' all-time ODI record score of 189.
- South Africa's score of 321/2 was their highest in ODIs.
- The United Arab Emirates' ninth-wicket partnership of 80* between Arshad Laeeq and Shaukat Dukanwala was the second-highest of all time.

17 February 1996
Scorecard

New Zealand; 307/8 (50 overs)	v	Netherlands; 188/7 (50 overs)
Craig Spearman 68 (59); Steven Lubbers 3/48 (9 overs)		Roland Lefebvre 45 (64); Chris Harris 3/24 (10 overs)

New Zealand won by 119 runs
Moti Bagh Stadium, Vadodara
Umpires: Khizer Hayat and Ian Robinson
Player of the match: Craig Spearman (NZ)

- This was the Netherlands' first ODI match.
- Peter Cantrell, Flavian Aponso, Steven Lubbers, Roland Lefebvre, Tim de Leede, Klaas-Jan van Noortwijk, Marcelis Schewe, Bastiaan Zuiderent, Eric Gouka and Paul-Jan Bakker (Ned) all made their ODI debut.
- At 47 years and 240 days, Nolan Clarke (Ned) became the oldest player to make his ODI debut.
- Stephen Fleming (NZ) took his only ODI wicket.

18 February
Scorecard

United Arab Emirates; 136 (48.3 overs)	v	England; 140/2 (35 overs)
Mazhar Hussain 33 (59); Neil Smith 3/29		Graham Thorpe 44* (66); Arshad Laeeq 1/25 (7 overs)

England won by 8 wickets
Arbab Niaz Stadium, Peshawar
Umpires: B. C. Cooray and V. K. Ramaswamy
Player of the match: Neil Smith (Eng)

20 February
Scorecard

New Zealand; 177/9 (50 overs)	v	South Africa; 178/5 (37.3 overs)
Stephen Fleming 33 (79); Allan Donald 3/34 (10 overs)		Hansie Cronje 78 (64); Nathan Astle 2/10 (3 overs)

South Africa won by 5 wickets
Iqbal Stadium, Faisalabad
Umpires: Steve Randell and Srinivasaraghavan Venkataraghavan
Player of the match: Hansie Cronje (SA)

22 February
Scorecard

England; 279/4 (50 overs)	v	Netherlands; 230/6 (50 overs)
Graeme Hick 104* (133); Roland Lefebvre 1/40 (10 overs)		Klaas van Noortwijk 64 (82); Phil DeFreitas 3/31 (10 overs)

England won by 49 runs
Arbab Niaz Stadium, Peshawar
Umpires: Steve Bucknor and K. T. Francis
Player of the match: Graeme Hick (Eng)

24 February
Scorecard

United Arab Emirates; 109/9 (33 overs)	v	Pakistan; 112/1 (18 overs)
Shaukat Dukanwala 21* (19); Mushtaq Ahmed 3/16 (7 overs)		Ijaz Ahmed 50* (57); Johanne Samarasekera 1/17 (3 overs)

Pakistan won by 9 wickets
Jinnah Stadium, Gujranwala
Umpires: B. C. Cooray and Srinivasaraghavan Venkataraghavan
Player of the match: Mushtaq Ahmed (Pak)

25 February
Scorecard

South Africa; 230 (50 overs)	v	England; 152 (44.3 overs)
Gary Kirsten 38 (60); Peter Martin 3/33 (10 overs)		Graham Thorpe 46 (69); Shaun Pollock 2/16 (8 overs)

South Africa won by 78 runs
Rawalpindi Cricket Stadium, Rawalpindi
Umpires: Steve Randell and Ian Robinson
Player of the match: Jonty Rhodes (SA)

26 February
Scorecard

Netherlands; 145/7 (50 overs)	v	Pakistan; 151/2 (30.4 overs)
Flavian Aponso 58; Waqar Younis 4/26		Saeed Anwar 83*; Peter Cantrell 1/18 (4 overs)

Pakistan won by 8 wickets
Gaddafi Stadium, Lahore
Umpires: K. T. Francis and Steve Bucknor
Player of the match: Waqar Younis (Pak)

27 February
Scorecard

New Zealand; 276/8 (47 overs)	v	United Arab Emirates; 167/9 (47 overs)
Roger Twose 92 (112); Azhar Saeed 3/45 (7 overs)		Johanne Samarasekera 47 (59); Shane Thomson 3/20

New Zealand won by 109 runs
Iqbal Stadium, Faisalabad
Umpires: B. C. Cooray and Srinivasaraghavan Venkataraghavan
Player of the match: Roger Twose (NZ)

- Match reduced to 47 overs a side due to heavy fog at the start of the match.

29 February
Scorecard

Pakistan; 242/6 (50 overs)	v	South Africa; 243/5 (44.2 overs)
Aamir Sohail 111 (139); Hansie Cronje 2/20 (5 overs)		Daryll Cullinan 65 (76); Waqar Younis 3/50 (8 overs)

South Africa won by 5 wickets
National Stadium, Karachi
Umpires: K. T. Francis and Steve Bucknor
Player of the match: Hansie Cronje (SA)

- Bucknor replaced Ian Robinson as an umpire in this match after protests by Pakistan.

1 March
Scorecard

Netherlands; 216/9 (50 overs)	v	United Arab Emirates; 220/3 (44.2 overs)
Peter Cantrell 47 (106); Shaukat Dukanwala 5/29 (10 overs)		Saleem Raza 84 (68); Roland Lefebvre 1/24 (8 overs)

United Arab Emirates won by 7 wickets
Gaddafi Stadium, Lahore
Umpires: Mahboob Shah and Steve Randell
Player of the match: Shaukat Dukanwala (UAE)

- This was the first ever official ODI between two ICC Associate teams.

3 March
Scorecard

England; 249/9 (50 overs)	v	Pakistan; 250/3 (47.4 overs)
Robin Smith 75 (92); Mushtaq Ahmed 3/53 (10 overs)		Saeed Anwar 71 (72); Dominic Cork 2/59 (10 overs)

Pakistan won by 7 wickets
National Stadium, Karachi
Umpires: B. C. Cooray and Srinivasaraghavan Venkataraghavan
Player of the match: Aamer Sohail (Pak)

5 March 1996
Scorecard

South Africa; 328/3 (50 overs)	v	Netherlands; 168/8 (50 overs)
Andrew Hudson 161 (132); Eric Gouka 1/32 (2 overs)		Nolan Clarke 32 (46); Allan Donald 2/21 (6 overs)

South Africa won by 160 runs
Rawalpindi Cricket Stadium, Rawalpindi
Umpires: Khizer Hayat (Pak) and Steve Randell (Aus)
Player of the match: Andrew Hudson (SA)

- South Africa won the toss and elected to bat.
- Peter Cantrell, Flavian Aponso, Marcelis Schewe, Eric Gouka, Steven Lubbers and Paul-Jan Bakker (all Ned) played their final ODI match.
- Nolan Clarke (Ned), aged 47 years and 257 days, played his final ODI match, the oldest player to do so.

6 March
Scorecard

Pakistan; 281/5 (50 overs)	v	New Zealand; 235 (47.3 overs)
Saeed Anwar 62 (67); Robert Kennedy 1/32 (5 overs)		Stephen Fleming 42 (43); Mushtaq Ahmed 2/32 (10 overs)

Pakistan won by 46 runs
Gaddafi Stadium, Lahore
Umpires: K. T. Francis and Ian Robinson
Player of the match: Saleem Malik (Pak)

== Knockout stage ==
Quarter-finals
9 March – Faisalabad, Pakistan
England	235/8
Sri Lanka	236/5
9 March – Bangalore, India
India	287/8
Pakistan	248/9
11 March – Karachi, Pakistan
West Indies	264/8
South Africa	245
11 March – Madras, India
New Zealand	286/9
Australia	289/4

Semi-finals
13 March – Calcutta, India
Sri Lanka	251/8
India	120/8
14 March – Mohali, India
West Indies	202
Australia	207/8

Final
17 March – Lahore, Pakistan
Sri Lanka	245/3
Australia	241/7

=== Quarter-finals ===
9 March
Scorecard

England; 235/8 (50 overs)	v	Sri Lanka; 236/5 (40.4 overs)
Phil DeFreitas 67 (64); Kumar Dharmasena 2/30 (10 overs)		Sanath Jayasuriya 82 (44); Dermot Reeve 1/14 (4 overs)

Sri Lanka won by 5 wickets
Iqbal Stadium, Faisalabad
Umpires: Mahboob Shah and Ian Robinson
Player of the match: Sanath Jayasuriya (SL)

- England won the toss and elected to bat first.
- Richard Illingworth played his final ODI game.
Robin Smith played his final ODI game.

9 March
Scorecard

India; 287/8 (50 overs)	v	Pakistan; 248/9 (49 overs)
Navjot Singh Sidhu 93 (115); Mushtaq Ahmed 2/56 (10 overs)		Aamer Sohail 55 (46); Venkatesh Prasad 3/45 (10 overs)

India won by 39 runs
M Chinnaswamy Stadium, Bangalore
Umpires: Steve Bucknor and David Shepherd
Player of the match: Navjot Singh Sidhu (Ind)

- India won the toss and elected to bat first.
- Pakistan was fined 1 over for a slow over rate.
- This was the last ODI which Javed Miandad played.

11 March
Scorecard

West Indies; 264/8 (50 overs)	v	South Africa; 245 (49.3 overs)
Brian Lara 111 (94); Brian McMillan 2/37 (10 overs)		Daryll Cullinan 69 (78); Roger Harper 4/47 (10 overs)

West Indies won by 19 runs
National Stadium, Karachi
Umpires: K. T. Francis and Steve Randell
Player of the match: Brian Lara (WI)

- West Indies won the toss and elected to bat.

11 March
Scorecard

New Zealand; 286/9 (50 overs)	v	Australia; 289/4 (47.5 overs)
Chris Harris 130 (124); Glenn McGrath 2/50 (9 overs)		Mark Waugh 110 (112); Nathan Astle 1/21 (3 overs)

Australia won by 6 wickets
MA Chidambaram Stadium, Madras
Umpires: Cyril Mitchley and Srinivasaraghavan Venkataraghavan
Player of the match: Mark Waugh (Aus)

- New Zealand won the toss and elected to bat first.

=== Semi-finals ===
13 March
Scorecard

Sri Lanka; 251/8 (50 overs)	v	India; 120/8 (34.1 overs)
Aravinda de Silva 66 (47); Javagal Srinath 3/34 (7 overs)		Sachin Tendulkar 65 (88); Sanath Jayasuriya 3/12 (7 overs)

Sri Lanka won by default
Eden Gardens, Calcutta
Umpires: Steve Dunne and Cyril Mitchley
Player of the match: Aravinda de Silva (SL)

- India won the toss and elected to field.
- The match was awarded to Sri Lanka by match referee Clive Lloyd when play could not be continued due to the rioting crowd.
- Sri Lanka qualified for the final for first time.

14 March
Scorecard

Australia; 207/8 (50 overs)	v	West Indies; 202 (49.3 overs)
Stuart Law 72 (105); Curtly Ambrose 2/26 (10 overs)		Shivnarine Chanderpaul 80 (126); Shane Warne 4/36 (9 overs)

Australia won by 5 runs
Punjab Cricket Association Stadium, Mohali
Umpires: B. C. Cooray and Srinivasaraghavan Venkataraghavan
Player of the match: Shane Warne (Aus)

- Australia won the toss and elected to bat.
- Australia qualified for the final for third time after 1975 and 1987.
- This was the last ODI played by Richie Richardson.

== Final ==
17 March (D/N)
Scorecard

Australia; 241/7 (50 overs)	v	Sri Lanka; 245/3 (46.2 overs)
Mark Taylor 74 (83); Aravinda de Silva 3/42 (9 overs)		Aravinda de Silva 107* (124); Damien Fleming 1/43 (6 overs)

Sri Lanka won by 7 wickets
Gaddafi Stadium, Lahore
Umpires: Steve Bucknor and David Shepherd
Player of the match: Aravinda de Silva (SL)

- Sri Lanka won the toss and elected to field.

== Statistics ==
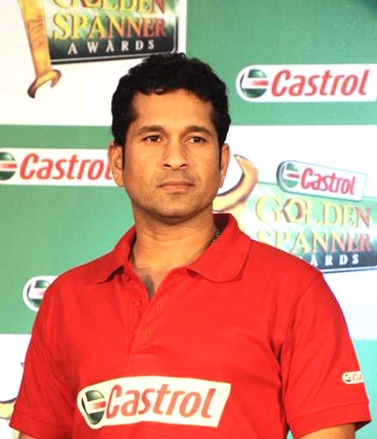
Sachin Tendulkar, the leading run scorer in the tournament

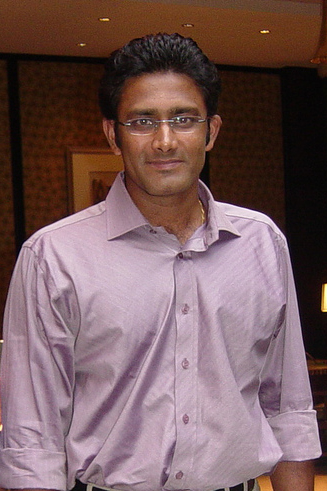
Anil Kumble, the leading wicket taker in the tournament

Leading run scorers
Runs	Player	Country
523	Sachin Tendulkar	India
484	Mark Waugh	Australia
448	Aravinda de Silva	Sri Lanka
391	Gary Kirsten	South Africa
329	Saeed Anwar	Pakistan

Leading wicket takers
Wickets	Player	Country
15	Anil Kumble	India
13	Waqar Younis	Pakistan
12
12	Paul Strang	Zimbabwe
12	Roger Harper	West Indies
12	Damien Fleming	Australia
12	Shane Warne	Australia
