= 1990 ICC Trophy =

- Dates: 4 – 23 June 1990
- Administrator: International Cricket Council
- Cricket format: Limited overs cricket
- Tournament format(s): Round-robin and Knockout
- Host: Netherlands
- Champions: Zimbabwe (3rd title)
- Runners-up: Netherlands
- Participants: 17
- Most runs: (Netherlands) Nolan Clarke (523)
- Most wickets: (Zimbabwe) Eddo Brandes (18)

The 1990 ICC Trophy was a limited-overs cricket tournament held in the Netherlands between 4 and 23 June 1990. It was the fourth ICC Trophy tournament to be staged, and the first to be held outside England. It was also the first ICC Trophy competition to have a title sponsor, being known officially as the Unibind ICC Trophy. As in previous Trophies, matches were played over 60 overs a side and with white clothing and red balls.

Zimbabwe won the competition for the third successive time, beating the Netherlands in the final for the second time, and also winning every game they played in the tournament. The tournament served as the Cricket World Cup qualification process – as winners, Zimbabwe qualified for the 1992 World Cup. In July 1992, Zimbabwe were promoted to Full Member status of the ICC.

== Teams and squads ==
Seventeen teams contested the tournament. All nineteen associate members of the International Cricket Council (ICC) at the time were eligible to compete at the tournament, with Japan and West Africa the only ones not to send a team.

- Argentina
- Bangladesh
- Bermuda
- Canada
- Denmark
- Fiji
- Gibraltar
- East and Central Africa
- Hong Kong
- Israel
- Kenya
- Malaysia
- Netherlands
- Papua New Guinea
- Singapore
- United States
- Zimbabwe

== First round ==
=== Teams ===
- Group A: Canada, Malaysia, Singapore, Zimbabwe
- Group B: Bangladesh, Bermuda, Fiji, Kenya
- Group C: Denmark, East and Central Africa, Gibraltar, USA
- Group D: Argentina, Hong Kong, Israel, Netherlands, Papua New Guinea

=== Results ===
Note: the winning team is always mentioned first. Italics indicate the side winning the toss.

==== Group A ====
- Canada (118/2) beat Singapore (108ao: MJ Prashad 4–21) by eight wickets.
- Zimbabwe (81/1: A Flower 56*) beat Malaysia (80ao: AJ Traicos 4–10) by nine wickets.
- Canada (153/2: P Prashad 52*) beat Malaysia (148ao: A Stevens 56; BB Seebaran 4–34) by eight wickets.
- Zimbabwe (109/0: GW Flower 53*, GA Paterson 52*) beat Singapore (108ao: Jarvis 4–21) by ten wickets.
- Zimbabwe (215ao: GW Flower 70) beat Canada (147ao) by 68 runs.
- Singapore (151/6: B Balakrishnan 55*) beat Malaysia (147ao) by four wickets.

==== Group B ====
- Bangladesh (190/7) beat Kenya (189/9) by three wickets.
- Fiji (206/9: VSJ Campbell 55) beat Bermuda (148ao) by 58 runs.
- Bangladesh (175ao) beat Bermuda (139ao) by 36 runs.
- Kenya (169/6) beat Fiji (168/8: CAC Browne 66*) by two wickets. (50 overs a side)
- Bangladesh (193/7) beat Fiji (189ao) by three wickets.
- Bermuda (280ao: W Smith 57, T Smith 54) beat Kenya (214/9) by 66 runs.

==== Group C ====
- USA (198/7: ZA Amin 53) beat Gibraltar (103ao: KR Khan 4–11, ZA Amin 4–29) by 95 runs. (50 overs a side)
- Denmark (197/9: S Mikkelsen 54*) beat East and Central Africa (94ao: OH Mortensen 4–30) by 103 runs.
- Denmark (129/3) beat Gibraltar (128ao: OH Mortensen 4–27) by seven wickets.
- No result between USA (404/9: E Peart 101, H Blackman 100; FM Sarigat 4–76) and East and Central Africa (44/2).
- Replay of above game: USA (186/5: H Blackman 63; BR Bouri 4–44) beat East and Central Africa (184ao: R Benjamin 5–27) by five wickets.
- Gibraltar (124/3) beat East and Central Africa (123ao: H Patadia 55; R Brooks 4–18) by seven wickets.
- USA (224/8: E Peart 59; N Bindslev 4–53) beat Denmark (212ao: JS Jensen 57) by 12 runs.

==== Group D ====
- Papua New Guinea (265/7: T Ao 88, T Raka 59*) beat Argentina (98o) by 167 runs.
- Netherlands (402/4: R Gomes 169*, NE Clarke 154) beat Israel (64ao: SW Lubbers 4–13) by 338 runs.
- Israel (129/9) beat Argentina (127ao: A Moss 5–27) by one wicket.
- Netherlands (184/3: NE Clarke 116*) beat Hong Kong (178/7) by seven wickets.
- Papua New Guinea (220/7: R Ila 56, C Amini 50) beat Hong Kong (184ao: DA Jones 71; K Loi 5–34) by 36 runs.
- Netherlands (302/7: RP Lefebvre 109*, NE Clarke 61) beat Argentina (79ao) by 223 runs.
- Hong Kong (230/9: NP Stearns 57; AG Morris 4–38) beat Argentina (164ao: GWA Ferguson 57; D Paull 5–27, S Tariq 4–34) by 63 runs.
- Papua New Guinea (190ao: T Ao 59) beat Israel (133/9) by 57 runs. (50 overs a side)
- Hong Kong (323/4: J Marsden 150, MN Sabine 60*, SN Krishna Kumar 58) beat Israel (179ao: DN Brettell 4–53) by 144 runs.
- Netherlands (237ao: TBM de Leede 50) beat Papua New Guinea (77ao) by 160 runs.

== First round group tables ==
Teams highlighted in yellow qualified for the second round.

Group A
Pos	Team	P	W	L	RR	Pts
1	Zimbabwe	3	3	0	3.733	12
2	Canada	3	2	1	3.158	8
3	Singapore	3	1	2	2.058	4
4	Malaysia	3	0	3	2.083	0

Group B
Pos	Team	P	W	L	RR	Pts
1	Bangladesh	3	3	0	3.156	12
2	Kenya	3	1	2	3.439	4
3	Fiji	3	1	2	3.312	4
4	Bermuda	3	1	2	3.150	4

Group C
Pos	Team	P	W	L	RR	Pts
1	United States	3	3	0	4.058	12
2	Denmark	3	2	1	3.449	8
3	Gibraltar	3	1	2	2.509	4
4	East and Central Africa	3	0	3	2.228	0

Group D
Pos	Team	P	W	L	RR	Pts
1	Netherlands (H)	4	4	0	5.466	16
2	Papua New Guinea	4	3	1	3.270	12
3	Hong Kong	4	2	2	3.812	8
4	Israel	4	1	3	2.285	4
5	Argentina	4	0	4	1.962	0

== Second round ==
=== Teams ===
- Group A: Kenya, Papua New Guinea, USA, Zimbabwe
- Group B: Bangladesh, Canada, Denmark, Netherlands

=== Summary reports ===
==== Group A ====
Zimbabwe continued their winning ways with three victories to top the table. They started with a straightforward nine-wicket victory over Papua New Guinea: the Papuans, having won the toss and decided to bat, fell to 44/4 before recovering a little to post 133ao, but it was never likely to be enough and so it proved as the Zimbabweans reached 134/1 thanks to Andy Flower's 80*. In the next match, having put the US in to bat, 5–22 from Eddo Brandes kept the Americans down to 131ao, with Zimbabwe then strolling to 132/3 (Grant Flower 52*) and a seven-wicket win. Finally Zimbabwe were inserted by Kenya but compiled 259/9 (AH Omarshah 69), tight bowling keeping their opponents down to 126/6, 133 runs adrift.

Kenya were the other qualifiers for the semi-finals, on run rate. They restricted the US to 162ao after the Americans had chosen to bat, then an unbeaten 79 from Maurice Odumbe guided them to 163/4 and victory by six wickets. Next, however, Papua New Guinea, winning the toss and batting, posted 230ao thanks to 55 by Amini and no less than 54 extras; this profligacy with the ball cost them the game as they fell to 193ao (MO Odumbe 64) and a 37-run defeat. Finally in Group A, the USA chose to bat first against the Papuans, and their choice was vindicated as their shaky-looking 190ao (KR Khan 52) turned out to be more than sufficient, E Daley claiming 4–35 as the United States recorded a 67-run triumph.

==== Group B ====
The Netherlands won Group B on the basis of better run rate than Bangladesh's, despite losing their first match to Canada by 21 runs. Having put Canada in, Eric Dulfer's 5–38 was overshadowed by D Singh's 64 as the North Americans recovered from 79/6 to put up 199ao; the Dutch could manage only 178/8 from their 60 overs. The Netherlands made amends by annihilating Bangladesh by 161 runs in their next game, choosing to bat first and posting 309/7 (NE Clarke 83, RP Lefebvre 75) despite having been 27/2 at one stage, before running through the entire Bangladeshi order for 148; then winning an all-European affair with Denmark. Again winning the toss and batting, the Dutch team were restricted to a moderate 176ao (GJAF Aponso 54; SRM Sorensen 4–43) but ended up winning by 54 runs having bowled out the Danes for 122.

Bangladesh were the final side through to the semis. Asked to field first by Denmark, A From-Hansen made 57 and JS Jensen 50 out of the Danes' 233/9, but Nurul Abedin (85) and Akram Khan (50) were the Asians' heroes as they reached 235/7 with just two balls to spare. The Bangladeshis enjoyed a far more comfortable 117-run win against Canada in their other game: inserted by the Canadians, Bangladesh produced a total of 265/6 (Nurul Abedin 105, Faruk Ahmed 56) before dismissing their opponents for 148, only opener Ingleton Liburd (60) showing fight for Canada. Finally, Denmark's decision to ask Canada to bat first proved correct as the Canadians were bowled out for 142, Denmark cruising to 143/4 for a six-wicket victory.

== Second round group tables ==
Teams highlighted in yellow qualified for the semi-finals.

Group A
Pos	Team	P	W	L	RR	Pts
1	Zimbabwe	3	3	0	3.706	12
2	Kenya	3	1	2	2.975	4
3	Papua New Guinea	3	1	2	2.700	4
4	United States	3	1	2	2.683	4

Group B
Pos	Team	P	W	L	RR	Pts
1	Netherlands (H)	3	2	1	3.683	8
2	Bangladesh	3	2	1	3.607	8
3	Denmark	3	1	2	2.095	4
4	Canada	3	1	2	2.717	4

== Plate ==
=== Teams ===
- Group G: Bermuda, Gibraltar, Israel, Singapore
- Group H: Argentina, East and Central Africa, Fiji, Hong Kong, Malaysia

=== Summary of results ===
Note: the winning team is always given first. Italics indicate the side winning the toss.

==== Group G ====
- Singapore (112/3) beat Israel (111ao) by seven wickets.
- Bermuda (320/9: R Hill 100, AC Douglas 63*; R Brooks 4–42) beat Gibraltar (140ao: S Chinnappa 53) by 180 runs.
- Gibraltar (146/4: S Chinnappa 51*) beat Singapore (144ao: B Balakrishnan 60; A Raikes 4–30) by six wickets.
- Bermuda (291/7: NA Gibbons 68) beat Singapore (83ao: R Leverock 4–14) by 208 runs.
- Gibraltar (270/5: C Robinson 79*) beat Israel (269/9: H Awasker 66, S Erulkar 54) by five wickets.
- Bermuda (85/3: AL Manders 52*) beat Israel (84ao: G Brangman 4–9) by seven wickets.

==== Group H ====
- Fiji (288/8: J Sorovakatini 63, CAC Browne 52) beat Argentina (220ao: MD Morris 61) by 68 runs.
- East and Central Africa (180/8) beat Malaysia (131ao: BR Bouri 3–15 inc hat-trick) by 49 runs. (50 overs a side)
- Argentina (188/7: ME Ryan 76*) beat East and Central Africa (184ao) by three wickets.
- Hong Kong (169/7) beat Malaysia (168ao: S Bell 61) by three wickets.
- Malaysia (246/9: A Stevens 102, M Saat Jalil 53) beat Argentina (91ao: MA Muniandy 4–17) by 155 runs.
- Fiji (185/4: CAC Browne 65, J Sorovakatini 57) beat Hong Kong (182ao: ND Maxwell 4–30) by six wickets.
- Hong Kong (204/7) beat East and Central Africa (203ao: S Tariq 4–46) by three wickets.
- Fiji (147/2: ND Maxwell 84) beat Malaysia (146ao) by eight wickets.
- Fiji (214/9) beat East and Central Africa (119ao) by 95 runs. (50 overs a side)

=== Plate group tables ===
Group G
Pos	Team	P	W	L	RR	Pts
1	Bermuda	3	3	0	5.175	12
2	Gibraltar	3	2	1	3.450	8
3	Singapore	3	1	2	2.255	4
4	Israel	3	0	3	2.578	0

Group H
Pos	Team	P	W	L	RR	Pts
1	Fiji	4	4	0	4.761	16
2	Hong Kong	4	3	1	3.317	12
3	East and Central Africa	4	1	3	3.118	4
4	Malaysia	4	1	3	3.004	4
5	Argentina	4	1	3	2.836	4

== Finals ==
=== Semi-finals ===
20 June
Scorecard

Kenya; 202 (59.4 overs)	v	Netherlands; 205/5 (56.2 overs)
Aasif Karim 53; Paul-Jan Bakker 6/41		Tim de Leede 56*; Tito Odumbe 3/39

Netherlands won by 5 wickets
De Diepput, The Hague

- Kenya won the toss and elected to bat.

21–22 June
Scorecard

Zimbabwe; 231/7 (60 overs)	v	Bangladesh; 147 (53.1 overs)
David Houghton 91*; Gholam Nousher 3/47		Minhajul Abedin 57; Kevin Duers 4/25

Zimbabwe won by 84 runs
De Diepput, The Hague

- Bangladesh won the toss and elected to field.
- No play was possible on 21 June, so the match was played on the following day. This also meant that the scheduled third-place play-off was cancelled.

=== Final ===
23 June
Scorecard

Netherlands; 197/9 (60 overs)	v	Zimbabwe; 198/4 (54.2 overs)
Steven Lubbers 47; Ali Shah 4/56		Andy Flower 69*; Roland Lefebvre 2/12

Zimbabwe won by 6 wickets
De Diepput, The Hague
Player of the match: Andy Flower (Zim)

- Netherlands won the toss and elected to bat.
- Zimbabwe won the 1990 ICC Trophy.

== Statistics ==
=== Most runs ===
The top five run scorers (total runs) are included in this table, ordered by runs, then by batting average, and then alphabetically.

Player	Team	Runs	Inns	Avg	Highest	100s	50s
Nolan Clarke	Netherlands	523	9	65.37	154	2	2
Roland Lefebvre	Netherlands	315	8	45.00	109*	1	1
Jason Marsden	Hong Kong	315	7	45.00	150	1	0
Andy Flower	Zimbabwe	311	7	77.75	80*	0	3
Maurice Odumbe	Kenya	289	7	48.16	79*	0	2

Source: CricketArchive

=== Most wickets ===
The top five wicket takers are listed in this table, listed by wickets taken and then by bowling average.

Player	Team	Overs	Wkts	Ave	SR	Econ	Best
Eddo Brandes	Zimbabwe	74.1	18	12.77	24.72	3.10	5/22
Salahuddin Tariq	Hong Kong	75.2	16	18.25	28.25	3.87	4/34
Roland Lefebvre	Netherlands	63.0	14	9.42	27.00	2.09	3/16
Kevin Duers	Zimbabwe	82.0	14	13.21	35.14	2.25	4/25
Zamin Amin	United States	63.3	13	12.84	29.30	2.62	4/29

Source: CricketArchive
