= Christopher Crocker =

Christopher Crocker may refer to:

- Chris Crocker (born 1987), American Internet celebrity
- Chris Crocker (American football) (born 1980), American football coach and safety
- Christopher Crocker (cricketer) (born 1963), English cricketer
