= Canadian cricket team in Barbados in 1987–88 =

The Canada national cricket team toured Barbados from October to November 1987 and played nine matches, including a limited overs fixture against the Barbados cricket team. Canada were captained by Martin Prashad. The match against Barbados was played at Kensington Oval, Bridgetown, and resulted in a win for Barbados by 3 wickets.
