= Steve Andrew =

English cricketer

Personal information
- Full name: Stephen Jon Walter Andrew
- Born: 27 January 1966 (age 60); Marylebone, London, England
- Height: 6 ft 3 in (1.91 m)
- Batting: Right-handed
- Bowling: Right-arm medium-fast

Domestic team information
- Years: Team
- 1984–1989: Hampshire
- 1990–1997: Essex
- 1999–2000: Hertfordshire

Career statistics
Competition	First-class	List A
Matches	132	91
Runs scored	499	153
Batting average	7.12	10.20
100s/50s	0/0	0/0
Top score	35	32
Balls bowled	19,487	4,037
Wickets	317	95
Bowling average	33.68	31.76
5 wickets in innings	7	1
10 wickets in match	0	0
Best bowling	7/47	5/24
Catches/stumpings	26/–	7/–
- Source: Cricinfo, 22 December 2009

Stephen Jon Walter Andrew (born 27 January 1966) is an English former cricketer. A right-arm medium-fast bowler, he played county cricket at first-class level for Hampshire and Essex, and minor counties cricket for Hertfordshire, in a career that spanned from 1984 to 2000. In 132 first-class appearances, he took over 300 wickets, while in 91 List A one-day matches, he took nearly 100 wickets.

== Cricket career ==
=== Hampshire ===
Andrew was born in Marylebone in January 1966. He was a gifted violinist as a child, but gave up pursuing music to concentrate on a career as a professional cricketer. He played Youth Test and One Day International's (ODI) for England Under-19s, making two Youth Test and ODI appearances apiece. Having played second eleven cricket for Hampshire in 1983, Andrew was retained ahead of the 1984 season. He made his first team debut for Hampshire in mid-May in a List A one-day match against Surrey at The Oval in the 1984 Benson & Hedges Cup, earning man-of-the-match with figures of 3 for 12. His first-class debut followed six days later against Sussex at Hove in the County Championship, with him taking 4 for 30 in Sussex's first innings. During his debut season, he made seven first-class appearances, taking 11 wickets with his right-arm medium-fast bowling at an average of 48.18; in eleven one-day matches, he took 12 wickets at an average of 30.33.

The following season, Andrew took 30 first-class wickets at an average of 33.06; he claimed his first five wicket haul against Gloucestershire, taking 6 for 43 on a damp and seaming wicket at Bournemouth. He played infrequently in the 1986 season, making seven first-class appearances and taking 14 wickets at an average of 29.92. The following season, he made 14 first-class appearances, taking 48 wickets at an average of 21.29; he twice took five or more wickets in an innings, with 7 for 92 against Gloucestershire at Southampton on what was described as a "placid pitch". In six one-day appearances in 1987, he took 8 wickets at an average of 26.75; against Essex in the Benson & Hedges Cup, the only time in his career that he took five wickets in an innings in one-day cricket.

He spent the winter prior to the 1988 season in Australia, but returned in March for treatment to a back injury. In 1988, he took 31 first-class wickets from 11 matches at an average of 24.67; his season best figures of 5 for 36 came against Oxford University. In one-day cricket in 1988, Hampshire were victorious in the Benson & Hedges Cup, with Andrew playing in the final against Derbyshire at Lord's. Playing in 17 one-day matches during the season, he took 16 wickets at an average of 36.75. Andrew made six first-class appearances in the 1989 season, taking 13 wickets at an average of 40.23. In one-day cricket, he made just one appearance in the Refuge Assurance League. Dropped early in the season and with Cardigan Connor and Paul-Jan Bakker preferred in the starting eleven, Andrew frustrated by the lack of opportunities afforded to him. He left the county in January 1990 to join Essex, lamenting on how he felt that no matter how well he was bowling in the Second Eleven, he was continuously overlooked.

=== Essex ===
In his first season at Essex, Andrew made 18 first-class appearances, taking 46 wickets at an average of 41.23; he took one five wicket haul, with 5 for 55 against Yorkshire in the County Championship in August. He also made five one-day appearances, taking 8 wickets at an average of 23.87. In 15 first-class appearances in the 1991 season, taking 43 wickets at an average of 31.44. He spent the winter prior to the 1992 season in New Zealand, but missed the start of the season upon his return after tripping over his cat and injuring his shoulder. He returned to Essex's County Championship team in June, making ten first-class appearances and taking 24 wickets at an average of 35.37. In the 1993 season, Andrew made 11 first-class appearances. He took 28 wickets at an average of 33.35, taking seven wickets in an innings twice; he took his career-best bowling figures of 7 for 47 against Lancashire at Old Trafford in June, and 7 for 69 against Glamorgan at Cardiff in September. He also played in ten one-day matches during the season, taking 10 wickets at an average of 32.60. It was not until July in the 1994 season that he featured in the County Championship side, with Andrew making only six first-class appearances during the season, taking 9 wickets at an average of 47.22.

Andrew began the 1995 season with a sprained neck, that persisted into May. He returned to the Essex side in mid-May, playing in a first-class match against Cambridge University; he made one County Championship appearance in June, and seven one-day appearances in the season, taking 9 wickets at an average of 22.55 in the latter. He made ten first-class appearances in 1996, taking 15 wickets at an average of 42.73. He featured more in one-day cricket during the season, making 16 appearances and taking 13 wickets at an average of 39.53. Following the season, the cricket journalist Colin Spiro, writing in the Harlow Star newspaper, observed that Andrew had become a back-up seamer in the team. He made three first-class and two one-day appearances in the 1997 season, with Essex releasing him in August.

=== Hertfordshire ===
After leaving Essex, Andrew began playing club cricket for Hertford in 1998, taking 31 wickets at an average of 14.32. In the same year he began playing minor counties cricket for Hertfordshire, and appeared in both the Minor Counties Championship and the MCCA Knockout Trophy. The following season, he played for Hertfordshire in the first three rounds of the NatWest Trophy, in which they defeated the Leicestershire Cricket Board and the Sussex Cricket Board's in the first and second rounds respectively, before losing to Lancashire. In the 2000 NatWest Trophy, he played in their first round defeat to Cambridgeshire. Andrew continued to play minor counties cricket for Hertfordshire until 2001, making 18 appearances in the Minor Counties Championship and 11 in the MCCA Knockout Trophy. By 2002, he was playing for Colchester and East Essex in the Essex Cricket League.

=== Playing style and statistics ===
Andrew was a right-arm medium-fast bowler. Spiro, writing in the Harlow Star, opined that he lacked penetration as a first-class bowler, but the restrictive nature of his bowling made him better suited to the one-day game. He made 132 appearances in first-class cricket, taking 317 wickets at an average of 33.68. He took five or more wickets in an innings on seven occasions. A lower-order batsman, he scored 499 runs in first-class cricket at an average of 7.12, with a top-score of 35. Only in one season, 1990, did he pass a hundred runs (119) in a season. He made 57 first-class appearances for Hampshire, taking 147 wickets at an average of 28.91, taking five or more wickets in an innings on four occasions. For Essex, he made 75 first-class appearances, taking 170 wickets at an average of 37.81, with three five wicket hauls. In one-day cricket, Andrew made 91 appearances and took 95 wickets at an average of 31.76. For Hampshire, he made 36 one-day appearances, taking 37 wickets at an average of 33.21. He took 52 one-day wickets at an average of 32.05 for Essex, from 51 matches.
