= List of Netherlands ODI cricketers =

Since the Netherlands' first One Day International (ODI) in 1996, 86 players have represented the team. A One Day International (ODI) is an international cricket match between two representative teams, each having ODI status, as determined by the International Cricket Council (ICC). An ODI differs from Test matches in that the number of overs per team is limited, and that each team has only one innings. The list is arranged in the order in which each player won his first ODI cap. Where more than one player won their first ODI cap in the same match, their names are listed alphabetically by surname.

== Key ==
General

- ‡ – Captain
- † – Wicket-keeper
- First – Year of debut
- Last – Year of latest game
- Mat – Number of matches played
- Win% – Winning percentage

Batting

- Runs – Runs scored in career
- HS – Highest score
- Avg – Runs scored per dismissal
- * – Batsman remained not out

Bowling

- Balls – Balls bowled in career
- Wkt – Wickets taken in career
- BBI – Best bowling in an innings
- Ave – Average runs per wicket

Fielding

- Ca – Catches taken
- St – Stumpings taken

== Players ==
Statistics are correct as of 2 November 2026.

Netherlands ODI cricketers
| General | | | | | Batting | | | | | Bowling | | | | | Fielding | | Ref(s) |
| Cap | Name | First | Last | Mat | Runs | HS | Avg | 50 | 100 | Balls | Wkt | BBI | Ave | 5WI | Ca | St | Ref(s) |
|---|---|---|---|---|---|---|---|---|---|---|---|---|---|---|---|---|---|
| 1 | Flavian Aponso | 1996 | 1996 | 5 | 120 | 58 | 30.00 | 2 | 0 | 242 | 2 | 1/57 | 128.50 | 0 | 0 | 0 | |
| 2 | Paul-Jan Bakker | 1996 | 1996 | 5 | 1 | 1* | – | 0 | 0 | 258 | 3 | 2/51 | 71.66 | 0 | 0 | 0 | |
| 3 | Peter Cantrell | 1996 | 1996 | 5 | 160 | 47 | 32.00 | 0 | 0 | 186 | 3 | 1/18 | 56.66 | 0 | 0 | 0 | |
| 4 | Nolan Clarke | 1996 | 1996 | 5 | 50 | 32 | 10.00 | 0 | 0 | – | – | – | – | – | 3 | 0 | |
| 5 | Tim de Leede | 1996 | 2007 | 29 | 400 | 58* | 16.66 | 2 | 0 | 1,139 | 29 | 4/35 | 34.44 | 0 | 7 | 0 | |
| 6 | Eric Gouka | 1996 | 1996 | 3 | 19 | 19 | 19.00 | 0 | 0 | 22 | 1 | 1/32 | 51.00 | 0 | 0 | 0 | |
| 7 | Roland Lefebvre‡ | 1996 | 2003 | 11 | 171 | 45 | 28.50 | 0 | 0 | 534 | 9 | 2/38 | 38.44 | 0 | 4 | 0 | |
| 8 | Steven Lubbers‡ | 1996 | 1996 | 4 | 24 | 9 | 8.00 | 0 | 0 | 216 | 5 | 3/48 | 37.40 | 0 | 1 | 0 | |
| 9 | Marcelis Schewe† | 1996 | 1996 | 5 | 49 | 20 | 16.33 | 0 | 0 | – | – | – | – | – | 2 | 1 | |
| 10 | Klaas-Jan van Noortwijk | 1996 | 2003 | 9 | 322 | 134* | 46.00 | 1 | 1 | – | – | – | – | – | 0 | 0 | |
| 11 | Bastiaan Zuiderent | 1996 | 2011 | 57 | 1,097 | 77* | 23.84 | 8 | 0 | – | – | – | – | – | 26 | 0 | |
| 12 | Floris Jansen | 1996 | 1996 | 2 | – | – | – | – | – | 54 | 1 | 1/40 | 62.00 | 0 | 1 | 0 | |
| 13 | Robert van Oosterom | 1996 | 2002 | 3 | 7 | 5* | 7.00 | 0 | 0 | – | – | – | – | – | 2 | 0 | |
| 14 | Adeel Raja | 2002 | 2011 | 21 | 28 | 8* | 2.80 | 0 | 0 | 846 | 17 | 4/42 | 40.58 | 0 | 3 | 0 | |
| 15 | Jacob-Jan Esmeijer | 2002 | 2003 | 6 | 10 | 7 | 2.50 | 0 | 0 | 228 | 0 | – | – | – | 3 | 0 | |
| 16 | Victor Grandia | 2002 | 2002 | 1 | 0 | 0 | 0.00 | 0 | 0 | 30 | 1 | 1/40 | 40.00 | 0 | 0 | 0 | |
| 17 | Edgar Schiferli | 2002 | 2013 | 30 | 161 | 41 | 10.06 | 0 | 0 | 1,294 | 33 | 4/23 | 30.54 | 0 | 3 | 0 | |
| 18 | Reinout Scholte† | 2002 | 2003 | 5 | 39 | 12 | 7.80 | 0 | 0 | – | – | – | – | – | 0 | 0 | |
| 19 | Daan van Bunge | 2002 | 2013 | 37 | 633 | 80 | 21.10 | 3 | 0 | 331 | 11 | 3/16 | 29.90 | 0 | 11 | 0 | |
| 20 | Luuk van Troost‡ | 2002 | 2007 | 23 | 284 | 40 | 15.77 | 0 | 0 | 246 | 4 | 2/29 | 70.00 | 0 | 6 | 0 | |
| 21 | Feiko Kloppenburg | 2002 | 2003 | 6 | 165 | 121 | 27.50 | 0 | 1 | 242 | 8 | 4/42 | 23.87 | 0 | 1 | 0 | |
| 22 | Hendrik-Jan Mol | 2002 | 2008 | 11 | 67 | 23 | 8.37 | 0 | 0 | 182 | 5 | 2/17 | 29.80 | 0 | 2 | 0 | |
| 23 | Jeroen Smits‡† | 2003 | 2009 | 38 | 169 | 29* | 16.90 | 0 | 0 | 0 | – | – | – | – | 41 | 7 | |
| 24 | Nick Statham | 2003 | 2009 | 3 | 7 | 7 | 2.33 | 0 | 0 | – | – | – | – | – | 0 | 0 | |
| 25 | Peter Borren‡ | 2006 | 2014 | 58 | 1,004 | 96 | 22.31 | 5 | 0 | 1,979 | 46 | 4/32 | 35.21 | 0 | 28 | 0 | |
| 26 | Alexei Kervezee | 2006 | 2012 | 39 | 924 | 92 | 28.00 | 4 | 0 | 24 | – | – | – | – | 18 | 0 | |
| 27 | Mohammad Kashif | 2006 | 2010 | 11 | 1 | 1 | 0.33 | 0 | 0 | 450 | 9 | 3/42 | 45.55 | 0 | 2 | 0 | |
| 28 | Darron Reekers | 2006 | 2009 | 19 | 481 | 104 | 25.31 | 0 | 1 | 510 | 13 | 3/54 | 33.53 | 0 | 7 | 0 | |
| 29 | Billy Stelling | 2006 | 2007 | 15 | 180 | 44 | 30.00 | 0 | 0 | 699 | 22 | 3/12 | 25.77 | 0 | 7 | 0 | |
| 30 | Ryan ten Doeschate | 2006 | 2011 | 33 | 1,541 | 119 | 67.00 | 9 | 5 | 1,580 | 55 | 4/31 | 24.12 | 0 | 13 | 0 | |
| 31 | Pieter Seelaar‡ | 2006 | 2022 | 57 | 347 | 43 | 11.96 | 0 | 0 | 2,609 | 57 | 4/15 | 35.68 | 0 | 18 | 0 | |
| 32 | Eric Szwarczynski | 2006 | 2014 | 41 | 1,102 | 98 | 29.78 | 10 | 0 | – | – | – | – | – | 7 | 0 | |
| 33 | Tom de Grooth | 2006 | 2013 | 34 | 480 | 97 | 17.14 | 1 | 0 | 6 | 1 | 1/2 | 2.00 | 0 | 6 | 0 | |
| 34 | Mark Jonkman | 2006 | 2010 | 16 | 59 | 16 | 11.80 | 0 | 0 | 719 | 24 | 3/24 | 23.54 | 0 | 1 | 0 | |
| 35 | Maurits van Nierop | 2006 | 2006 | 2 | 35 | 31* | 35.00 | 0 | 0 | – | – | – | – | – | 0 | 0 | |
| 36 | Mudassar Bukhari | 2007 | 2014 | 46 | 516 | 71 | 17.20 | 2 | 0 | 2,036 | 57 | 3/17 | 28.08 | 0 | 6 | 0 | |
| 37 | Atse Buurman† | 2007 | 2011 | 17 | 140 | 34 | 15.55 | 0 | 0 | – | – | – | – | – | 17 | 3 | |
| 38 | Geert-Maarten Mol | 2007 | 2008 | 6 | 25 | 14 | 12.50 | 0 | 0 | 162 | 3 | 2/23 | 37.00 | 0 | 2 | 0 | |
| 39 | Mangesh Panchal | 2007 | 2007 | 1 | – | – | – | – | – | 30 | 0 | – | – | – | 0 | 0 | |
| 40 | Maurits Jonkman | 2007 | 2010 | 4 | 20 | 13 | 10.00 | 0 | 0 | 136 | 6 | 3/22 | 18.83 | 0 | 1 | 0 | |
| 41 | Lesley Stokkers | 2008 | 2008 | 1 | 15 | 15* | – | 0 | 0 | – | – | – | – | – | 1 | 0 | |
| 42 | Ruud Nijman | 2009 | 2009 | 1 | – | – | – | – | – | 49 | 3 | 3/31 | 10.33 | 0 | 0 | 0 | |
| 43 | Tim Gruijters | 2010 | 2013 | 5 | 68 | 32 | 22.66 | 0 | 0 | 120 | 2 | 2/37 | 39.50 | 0 | 2 | 0 | |
| 44 | Tom Cooper | 2010 | 2023 | 32 | 1,319 | 101 | 45.48 | 12 | 1 | 649 | 14 | 3/11 | 36.85 | 0 | 17 | 0 | |
| 45 | Wesley Barresi† | 2010 | 2025 | 55 | 1,352 | 137* | 27.59 | 8 | 1 | 30 | 0 | – | – | – | 26 | 8 | |
| 46 | Bradley Kruger | 2010 | 2011 | 5 | 32 | 15 | 10.66 | 0 | 0 | 184 | 3 | 3/21 | 43.66 | – | 5 | 0 | |
| 47 | Bernard Loots | 2010 | 2011 | 7 | 16 | 9* | 5.33 | 0 | 0 | 280 | 6 | 3/16 | 47.83 | 0 | 3 | 0 | |
| 48 | Tom Heggelman | 2010 | 2011 | 5 | 27 | 22 | 5.40 | 0 | 0 | 102 | 5 | 3/29 | 17.20 | 0 | 1 | 0 | |
| 49 | Berend Westdijk | 2011 | 2011 | 4 | 1 | 1* | 0.50 | 0 | 0 | 156 | 1 | 1/56 | 195.00 | 0 | 1 | 0 | |
| 50 | Neil Kruger | 2011 | 2011 | 2 | 39 | 34 | 19.50 | 0 | 0 | – | – | – | – | – | 2 | 0 | |
| 51 | Michael Swart | 2011 | 2014 | 12 | 197 | 52 | 19.70 | 1 | 0 | 366 | 3 | 1/21 | 102.00 | 0 | 5 | 0 | |
| 52 | Ahsan Malik | 2011 | 2014 | 12 | 14 | 10* | – | 0 | 0 | 471 | 12 | 3/38 | 34.00 | 0 | 4 | 0 | |
| 53 | Vinoo Tewarie | 2011 | 2011 | 1 | 4 | 4 | 4.00 | 0 | 0 | – | – | – | – | – | 0 | 0 | |
| 54 | Stephan Myburgh | 2011 | 2022 | 22 | 527 | 74 | 26.35 | 4 | 0 | – | – | – | – | – | 4 | 0 | |
| 55 | Wilfred Diepeveen | 2011 | 2011 | 1 | 6 | 6 | 6.00 | 0 | 0 | – | – | – | – | – | 0 | 0 | |
| 56 | Timm van der Gugten | 2012 | 2026 | 18 | 127 | 49 | 15.87 | 0 | 0 | 714 | 19 | 5/24 | 23.42 | 2 | 2 | 0 | |
| 57 | Paul van Meekeren | 2013 | 2026 | 41 | 145 | 21* | 8.52 | 0 | 0 | 1,961 | 63 | 5/28 | 27.87 | 1 | 7 | 0 | |
| 58 | Michael Rippon | 2013 | 2022 | 9 | 180 | 67 | 30.00 | 2 | 0 | 402 | 13 | 4/37 | 23.00 | 0 | 4 | 0 | |
| 59 | Ben Cooper | 2013 | 2021 | 13 | 187 | 74 | 18.70 | 1 | 0 | – | – | – | – | 0 | 2 | 0 | |
| 60 | Vivian Kingma | 2014 | 2025 | 30 | 16 | 9* | 1.60 | 0 | 0 | 1,364 | 40 | 3/19 | 28.85 | 0 | 6 | 0 | |
| 61 | Bas de Leede | 2018 | 2026 | 64 | 1,574 | 145* | 30.26 | 7 | 2 | 1,611 | 48 | 5/52 | 32.93 | 1 | 34 | 0 | |
| 62 | Scott Edwards‡† | 2018 | 2026 | 78 | 2,487 | 94* | 42.15 | 25 | 0 | – | – | – | – | – | 73 | 12 | |
| 63 | Fred Klaassen | 2018 | 2026 | 23 | 79 | 13 | 9.87 | 0 | 0 | 1,281 | 34 | 3/23 | 27.88 | 0 | 8 | 0 | |
| 64 | Shane Snater | 2018 | 2022 | 4 | 33 | 17* | 11.00 | 0 | 0 | 150 | 2 | 1/41 | 94.00 | 0 | 5 | 0 | |
| 65 | Daniel ter Braak | 2018 | 2018 | 2 | 40 | 39 | 20.00 | 0 | 0 | – | – | – | – | – | 0 | 0 | |
| 66 | Max O'Dowd | 2019 | 2026 | 76 | 2,601 | 158* | 36.63 | 17 | 3 | 147 | 2 | 1/16 | 89.00 | 0 | 20 | 0 | |
| 67 | Roelof van der Merwe (Note: Roelof van der Merwe also played 13 One Day International matches for South Africa. Only his record for Netherlands is mentioned above.) | 2019 | 2026 | 33 | 306 | 57 | 15.30 | 1 | 0 | 1,549 | 37 | 3/14 | 30.97 | 0 | 13 | 0 | |
| 68 | Tobias Visee | 2019 | 2021 | 3 | 72 | 41 | 24.00 | 0 | 0 | – | – | – | – | – | 2 | 0 | |
| 69 | Brandon Glover | 2019 | 2023 | 9 | 29 | 18 | 14.50 | 0 | 0 | 438 | 9 | 3/43 | 49.33 | 0 | 3 | 0 | |
| 70 | Saqib Zulfiqar | 2019 | 2023 | 15 | 194 | 34* | 14.92 | 0 | 0 | 312 | 9 | 2/43 | 37.33 | 0 | 4 | 0 | |
| 71 | Aryan Dutt | 2021 | 2026 | 64 | 269 | 36* | 8.15 | 0 | 0 | 3,125 | 80 | 6/34 | 30.01 | 1 | 17 | 0 | |
| 72 | Logan van Beek | 2021 | 2026 | 38 | 526 | 59 | 21.91 | 1 | 0 | 1,905 | 55 | 4/24 | 31.18 | 0 | 20 | 0 | |
| 73 | Philippe Boissevain | 2021 | 2022 | 6 | 44 | 15 | 7.33 | 0 | 0 | 279 | 4 | 2/39 | 81.50 | 0 | 2 | 0 | |
| 74 | Musa Ahmed | 2021 | 2024 | 15 | 255 | 61 | 17.00 | 1 | 0 | 6 | 0 | – | – | 0 | 5 | 0 | |
| 75 | Colin Ackermann | 2021 | 2026 | 25 | 546 | 81 | 27.30 | 4 | 0 | 842 | 20 | 4/22 | 30.75 | 0 | 11 | 0 | |
| 76 | Boris Gorlee | 2022 | 2022 | 3 | 29 | 13 | 9.66 | 0 | 0 | – | – | – | – | – | 0 | 0 | |
| 77 | Ryan Klein | 2022 | 2026 | 15 | 46 | 8* | 5.11 | 0 | 0 | 645 | 12 | 2/31 | 44.66 | 0 | 3 | 0 | |
| 78 | Clayton Floyd | 2022 | 2024 | 10 | 14 | 9 | 3.50 | 0 | 0 | 426 | 5 | 2/41 | 67.20 | 0 | 2 | 0 | |
| 79 | Vikramjit Singh | 2022 | 2026 | 47 | 1,304 | 110 | 28.97 | 8 | 1 | 246 | 7 | 2/12 | 36.71 | 0 | 8 | 0 | |
| 80 | Teja Nidamanuru | 2022 | 2025 | 41 | 893 | 111 | 27.06 | 4 | 2 | 6 | 0 | – | – | 0 | 13 | 0 | |
| 81 | Shariz Ahmad | 2022 | 2026 | 21 | 159 | 30 | 10.60 | 0 | 0 | 646 | 20 | 5/43 | 31.85 | 1 | 8 | 0 | |
| 82 | Tim Pringle | 2022 | 2026 | 5 | 10 | 6 | 2.00 | 0 | 0 | 253 | 2 | 1/41 | 131.00 | 0 | 0 | 0 | |
| 83 | Noah Croes | 2023 | 2026 | 31 | 559 | 70 | 23.29 | 2 | 0 | – | – | – | – | – | 20 | 0 | |
| 84 | Sybrand Engelbrecht | 2023 | 2024 | 12 | 385 | 70 | 35.00 | 2 | 0 | 12 | 0 | – | – | 0 | 9 | 0 | |
| 85 | Kyle Klein | 2024 | 2026 | 26 | 160 | 25 | 14.54 | 0 | 0 | 1,176 | 47 | 4/32 | 20.29 | 0 | 3 | 0 | |
| 86 | Michael Levitt | 2024 | 2026 | 21 | 508 | 57 | 29.88 | 1 | 0 | 450 | 9 | 3/49 | 39.44 | 0 | 6 | 0 | |
| 87 | Zach Lion-Cachet | 2025 | 2026 | 21 | 406 | 78 | 21.36 | 2 | 0 | 400 | 14 | 3/15 | 23.78 | 0 | 12 | 0 | |
| 88 | Cedric de Lange | 2026 | 2026 | 10 | 314 | 102 | 34.88 | 1 | 1 | – | – | – | – | – | 3 | 0 | |
| 89 | Daniel Doram | 2026 | 2026 | 4 | – | – | – | – | – | 162 | 2 | 2/51 | 69.50 | 0 | 0 | 0 | |
| 90 | Alex Roy | 2026 | 2026 | 6 | 21 | 15* | 21.00 | 0 | 0 | 246 | 6 | 3/24 | 25.16 | 0 | 1 | 0 | |

== See also ==
- Dutch national cricket captains
- List of Netherlands first-class cricketers
- List of Netherlands Twenty20 International cricketers
- Netherlands national cricket team
- One Day International
