= Hendrik-Jan Mol =

Dutch cricketer (born 1977)

Personal information
- Full name: Hendrik-Jan Christiaan Mol
- Born: 29 March 1977 (age 49); The Hague, Netherlands
- Batting: Left-handed
- Bowling: Left arm medium
- Role: All-rounder
- Relatives: Geert-Maarten Mol (brother)

International information
- National side: Netherlands (2002–2008)
- ODI debut (cap 22): 21 September 2002 v Pakistan
- Last ODI: 21 August 2008 v Kenya
- ODI shirt no.: 14
- T20I debut (cap 3): 2 August 2008 v Canada
- Last T20I: 5 August 2008 v Ireland
- T20I shirt no.: 14

Domestic team information
- Years: Team
- Quick Haag

Career statistics
Competition	ODI	T20I	FC	LA
Matches	11	4	1	12
Runs scored	67	0	13	123
Batting average	8.37	0.00	13.00	13.66
100s/50s	0/0	0/0	0/0	0/1
Top score	23	0	13	56
Balls bowled	182	9	48	182
Wickets	5	0	0	5
Bowling average	29.80	–	–	29.80
5 wickets in innings	0	–	–	0
10 wickets in match	0	–	–	0
Best bowling	2/17	–	–	2/17
Catches/stumpings	2/–	1/–	0/–	2/–
- Source: Cricinfo, 13 May 2017

Hendrik-Jan Christiaan Mol (born 29 March 1977) is a Dutch former cricketer. He is a left-handed batsman and a left-arm medium-pace bowler, with an action comparable to Wasim Akram's. He is also a quick infielder. His left-arm protoge is Mart Spruit. Experts claim he could surpass Hendrik-Jan Mol one day.
