= Maurits van Nierop =

Dutch cricketer

Personal information
- Full name: Maurits William Albert van Nierop
- Born: 11 May 1983; Cape Town, South Africa
- Died: 24 September 2008 (aged 25); Cape Town, South Africa
- Batting: Right-handed
- Bowling: Right-arm medium
- Role: Batsman

International information
- National side: Netherlands (2002–2006)
- ODI debut (cap 35): 28 November 2006 v Bermuda
- Last ODI: 1 December 2006 v Canada

Career statistics
Competition	ODI	FC	LA
Matches	2	4	7
Runs scored	35	134	131
Batting average	35.00	33.50	21.83
100s/50s	0/0	0/0	0/1
Top score	31*	41	60
Catches/stumpings	0/–	1/–	0/–
- Source: CricketArchive, 24 September 2008

Maurits William Albert van Nierop (11 May 1983 – 24 September 2008) was a Dutch international cricketer. A right-handed batsman and right-arm medium pace bowler, he played for the Netherlands national cricket team from 2002 until 2006, and had been named in the Dutch winter squad shortly before his death, at age 25.

== Biography ==
Born in Cape Town in 1983, the son of former Dutch international cricketer Albert Van Nierop, Maurits van Nierop first played for the Netherlands at Under-15 level in the Lombard Under-15 Challenge Cup in England in 1996. He played for the Dutch Under-17 team in 1999, and for the Dutch Under-19 team from 1999 until 2001.

He played for the Marylebone Cricket Club Young Cricketers from 2001 until 2003 and was the first Dutch player to play for the team. In 2002, after matches for the Dutch A side in the European Development XI Championship, he made his debut for the Dutch senior side, playing against a Kent Cricket League XI before making his List A debut against Bedfordshire.

He played twice for the Netherlands against Denmark in July 2003, and for the Dutch A side again the following month. He played in the 2004 European Championship Division One tournament, making his first-class debut shortly afterwards against Ireland in the ICC Intercontinental Cup. He also played a match against Pakistan that year.

He returned to the Dutch youth set-up in 2005, playing in the European Under-23 Championship in Deventer. He captained the Dutch team for the tournament. He played two matches in the 2005 ICC Intercontinental Cup, and returned to List A cricket in 2006 when he played for the Dutch A side in the EurAsia Cricket Series in Abu Dhabi. He scored 60 in the second match against Pakistan A, his highest score in List A cricket.

Later that year, he made his One Day International debut against Bermuda in Potchefstroom, playing his second and final ODI three days later against Canada. He played his final first-class match, also against Canada, four days later in Pretoria, which was to be his last appearance for the Netherlands.

== Death ==
Van Nierop moved to Cape Town to work in 2006, and began playing for a local club. He died in the city in the early hours of 24 September 2008. He had been out for the evening with Ryan Maron, the coach at his old club in the Netherlands. The two had dinner together and then spent time socialising at a night club with members of the South African cricket team, reportedly including Graeme Smith and Mark Boucher.

Van Nierop stayed out when Maron went home, indicating that he would follow him home later. Reports suggested that friends he had expected to meet with did not turn up, so he headed home. At 4:45 am, a security guard witnessed him jump down from a wall in the Woodstock area of Cape Town and land on his head, suffering fatal injuries.

He had been named in the Dutch winter squad less than a week earlier and was thought to be in line for a comeback to the national side. He had planned to return to playing cricket in the Netherlands in the 2009 season.
