= Vinoo Tewarie =

Dutch cricketer (born 1991)

Personal information
- Full name: Vinoo Arsh Baldewpersad Tewarie
- Born: 15 September 1991 (age 35); Purmerend, Netherlands
- Batting: Right-handed
- Bowling: Legbreak

International information
- National side: Netherlands
- Only ODI (cap 53): 29, June 2011 v Scotland

Career statistics
Competition	ODI
Matches	1
Runs scored	4
Batting average	4
100s/50s	0/0
Top score	4
Catches/stumpings	0/0

Vinoo Tewarie is a Dutch cricketer who has represented the Netherlands national team in a One Day International against Scotland during the World Cricket League in 2011. He has also represented the Netherlands at the under-19 level.

== External List ==
- ESPNcricinfo
