= Christopher Crocker (cricketer) =

English cricketer

Personal information
- Full name: Christopher Simon Codrington Crocker
- Born: 25 January 1963 (age 63); Edgbaston, Warwickshire, England
- Batting: Right-handed
- Bowling: Right-arm medium

Domestic team information
- Years: Team
- 1989: Oxford University

Career statistics
Competition	First-class
Matches	1
Runs scored	9
Batting average	4.50
100s/50s	–/–
Top score	7
Balls bowled	162
Wickets	0
Bowling average	–
5 wickets in innings	–
10 wickets in match	–
Best bowling	–
Catches/stumpings	2/–
- Source: Cricinfo, 4 March 2020

Christopher Simon Codrington Crocker (born 25 January 1963) is an English former first-class cricketer.

Crocker was born at Edgbaston in January 1963. He later studied at Jesus College, Oxford where he played first-class cricket for Oxford University in 1989, making a single appearance against Hampshire at Oxford. Batting twice in the match, he was dismissed for 7 runs in the Oxford first-innings by Cardigan Connor, while in their second-innings he was dismissed for 2 runs by Steve Andrew. Crocker also bowled a total of 27 wicketless overs across the match, conceding 40 runs.
