= Geert-Maarten Mol =

Dutch cricketer (born 1983)

Personal information
- Full name: Geert-Maarten Christiaan Mol
- Born: 12 October 1983 (age 43); The Hague, Netherlands
- Batting: Right-handed
- Bowling: Right arm medium
- Role: Bowler
- Relatives: Hendrik-Jan Mol (brother)

International information
- National side: Netherlands
- ODI debut (cap 38): 11 July 2007 v Ireland
- Last ODI: 21 August 2008 v Kenya
- Only T20I (cap 12): 5 August 2008 v Ireland

Career statistics
Competition	ODI	T20I (Note: Mol's only T20I match was abandoned without a ball being bowled.)	FC
Matches	6	1	3
Runs scored	25	–	53
Batting average	12.50	–	10.60
100s/50s	0/0	–	0/0
Top score	14	–	21
Balls bowled	162	–	162
Wickets	3	–	2
Bowling average	37.33	–	59.00
5 wickets in innings	0	–	0
10 wickets in match	0	–	0
Best bowling	2/23	–	2/78
Catches/stumpings	2/–	–	5/–
- Source: CricketArchive, 17 January 2009

Geert-Maarten Christiaan Mol (born 12 October 1983) is a Dutch One Day International cricketer. His brother Hendrik-Jan Mol also plays for the Netherlands cricket team.

== Career ==
Mol made his ODI debut against Ireland at Belfast. Batting at number 8, he came to the crease in the 47th over with his side edging towards an upset. With 6 runs required from the final 3 deliveries of the match, Mol was on strike and facing Kevin O'Brien. He played out a couple of dots balls, the first allowed to go through to the keeper. Needing a six to win off the last ball he could only manage a 4 through the covers meaning that the Netherlands lost by one run.
