= Sean Davies =

Zimbabwean cricketer (born 1973)

Cricket information
- Batting: Left-handed
- Bowling: Right-arm medium-fast

Career statistics
Competition	ODI
Matches	4
Runs scored	67
Batting average	16.75
100s/50s	0/0
Top score	45
Catches/stumpings	0/–
- Source: Cricinfo, 2 May 2006

Sean Gerard Davies (born 15 October 1973) is a Zimbabwean cricketer. He played four One Day Internationals for Zimbabwe in early 1996. He has since moved to England where he captained Wimbledon Cricket Club in the Surrey League and coached at King's College School, Wimbledon.
