= Marcelis Schewe =

Dutch cricketer (born 1969)

Marcel Schewe
Personal information
- Full name: Marcelis Michael Catharinus Schewe
- Born: 10 March 1969 (age 57); Wateringen, Netherlands
- Batting: Right-handed
- Role: Wicket-keeper

International information
- National side: Netherlands (1996–1996)
- ODI debut (cap 9): 17 February 1996 v New Zealand
- Last ODI: 5 May 1996 v South Africa

Career statistics
Competition	ODI	LA
Matches	5	7
Runs scored	49	80
Batting average	16.33	16.00
100s/50s	0/0	0/0
Top score	20	21
Catches/stumpings	2/1	2/1
- Source: Cricinfo, 15 May 2017

Marcelis Michael Catharinus Schewe (born 10 May 1969) is a Dutch former cricketer and the first Dutch wicket-keeper in the international arena. He played five One Day Internationals for the Netherlands in the 1996 Cricket World Cup.
