= Martin Prashad =

Canadian cricketer of Guyanese origin

Personal information
- Full name: Martin Joel Prashad
- Born: 31 August 1959; Albion, British Guiana
- Died: 26 October 2000 (aged 41); Brampton, Ontario, Canada
- Batting: Right-handed
- Bowling: Right-arm off spin
- Role: All-rounder
- Relatives: Paul Prashad (brother)

International information
- National side: Canada (1983–1996)

Career statistics
Competition	List A	ICC Trophy
Matches	2	19
Runs scored	10	269
Batting average	–	20.69
100s/50s	0/0	0/0
Top score	9*	49
Balls bowled	12	444
Wickets	0	7
Bowling average	–	31.57
5 wickets in innings	–	0
10 wickets in match	–	0
Best bowling	–	4/21
Catches/stumpings	0/–	6/–
- Source: CricketArchive, 7 April 2015

Martin Joel Prashad (31 August 1959 – 26 October 2000) was a Canadian cricketer of Guyanese origin. His career for the Canadian national side spanned from 1983 to 1996, and included games at the 1986, 1990, and 1994 editions of the ICC Trophy.

== Biography ==
Born in Albion, British Guiana, Prashad emigrated to Canada in 1979, with his family. He began playing club cricket in Toronto the following year, and made a century on his first-grade debut. His debut in representative matches came during the same season, when he appeared for a Canadian under-25 side against the Bermuda under-23s, and also for Ontario in the annual Atholstan Trophy match against Quebec. Prashad's senior international debut came in September 1983, in the then-annual fixture against the United States. A right-handed middle-order batsman and occasional off-spinner, his first major tournament with the Canadian national team was the 1986 ICC Trophy in England, where he played in all eight of Canada's group-stage matches. Also debuting for Canada at the tournament was his younger brother, Paul Prashad, who went on to hit three centuries, leading the competition in runs. Martin Prashad had less success, with 159 runs from six innings. His best innings was 49 runs against Papua New Guinea, which included a 101-run partnership with his brother (who hit a record 164 not out).

During the 1987 season, Prashad twice served as Canada's captain – in a three-day game against the United States played in Winnipeg, and then in a one-day fixture against a Barbados team captained by Joel Garner. Despite Barbados also including West Indies opening batsman Gordon Greenidge in its line-up, they won only narrowly, with three wickets remaining. Prashad again featured in all of Canada's matches at the 1990 ICC Trophy in the Netherlands, but both he and the team had little success, with his final runs total being 73 from four innings. His best batting performance, 39 runs, was Canada's highest individual score in its loss to Denmark, while his best bowling performance was 4/21 from 12 overs against Singapore. The next ICC Trophy, held in Kenya in 1994, was Prashad's last for Canada. Playing for the third time alongside his brother, his five matches (out of a possible seven) yielded only 37 runs.

Prashad's last recorded competitive matches for Canada came in October 1996, during the 1996–97 season of the Shell/Sandals Trophy, the West Indian domestic one-day tournament. The tournament, which held List A status, featured teams outside the scope of the West Indies Cricket Board (WICB) for the first time, with Canada and Bermuda participating as invitational teams. Prashad played in only two matches (against Jamaica and the Leeward Islands), bowling two overs without taking a wicket and scoring ten runs without being dismissed. He was 37 at the time of his last match. In Toronto club cricket, Prashad switched clubs in 1990, transferring from Overseas to Vikings and subsequently captaining his new side to two titles early in the decade. Aged only 41, he died at Peel Memorial Hospital in October 2000, having earlier been diagnosed with a brain tumour. He was posthumously inducted into Cricket Canada's Hall of Fame in 2014.
