= Edward Sleijffers =

Dutch cricketer

Personal information
- Full name: Eduardus Franciscus Maria Sleijffers
- Born: 13 September 1977 (age 49); The Hague, Netherlands
- Batting: Right-handed
- Bowling: Left-arm orthodox

International information
- National side: Netherlands (1995–1999)
- Source: CricketArchive, 18 April 2016

Eduardus Franciscus Maria "Edward" Sleijffers (born 13 September 1977) is a former Dutch international cricketer who represented the Dutch national side between 1995 and 1999. He played as a left-arm orthodox bowler.

Sleijffers was born in The Hague, and played his club cricket for HCC. He made his senior debut for the Netherlands in March 1995, age of 17, on a tour of India that included matches against various Indian domestic teams. In June 1996, Sleijffers represented the Netherlands in two one-day fixtures against Pakistan, prior to that team's 1996 tour of England. He took 2/40 in the first match and 3/63 in the second. Sleijffers' last matches for the national team came in the 1999 NatWest Trophy – an English domestic competition where matches held List A status. He took 1/19 in the first match, against Cambridgeshire, but was not called upon to bowl in the second, against the Lancashire Cricket Board, and was not selected in his team's two other games.
