= Saleem Raza (cricketer) =

Emirati cricketer (born 1964)

Cricket information
- Batting: Right-handed
- Bowling: Right-arm offbreak
- Source: CricInfo, 15 August 2022

Saleem Raza (born 5 July 1964) is a Pakistani-born former cricketer who played for the United Arab Emirates national cricket team. After playing in eight first-class cricket games for his native Lahore City from 1986–87 to 1987–88, Saleem Raza emigrated to the United Arab Emirates, where he competed in the 1994 ICC Trophy. He also played for the UAE in the 1994 Australia-Asia Cup and the 1996 World Cup. Saleem was the hero for the UAE in the World Cup as his innings of 84 off 68 deliveries including six sixes helped the UAE to pull off a sensational victory against Netherlands. The match was played in Lahore, the place of his birth. This was the last of his 6 ODIs in his international career.

He also scored 286 runs and took 14 wickets in the ICC Trophy in Kenya. Raza was awarded the Player of the Tournament.
