= Mazhar Hussain =

UAR cricketer (born 1967)

Personal information
- Born: 25 October 1967 (age 59); Lahore, Pakistan
- Batting: Right-handed
- Bowling: Legbreak
- Source: CricInfo, 17 September 2025

Sheikh Mazhar Hussain (born 25 October 1967) is a Pakistani-born former cricketer who played for various Lahore teams from 1984–85 to 1988–89 before emigrating to the United Arab Emirates. Hussain then played international cricket for his adopted nation between 1993–94 and 1995–96.

Hussain notched up a total of 24 first-class games while playing in his native Pakistan, making a top score of 139. He also played for Pakistan B in three first-class games on their tour to Zimbabwe in 1986–87. However, he was never selected for the full Pakistan side and blamed his non-selection on "petty politics and favouritism".

He first represented the UAE in the 1994 ICC Trophy, and established himself as one of the leading cricketers, if not the leading cricketer, in the UAE team. Indeed, it was in the 1994 tournament, against Ireland, that Hussain became the first Emirates batsman to score a century. In the 1994 Pepsi Austral-Asia Cup, held in Sharjah, he played his first two One Day International, scoring 70 in the first ODI, against India. This 70 was the first half-century made by an Emirati batsman in an ODI and as of 2006 is the second highest score made by an Emirati batsman in ODI cricket.

Hussain went on to play in five more ODIs in the 1996 World Cup. Hussain's 179 runs in ODI cricket make him the highest-scoring Emirati in One Day Internationals.

He played 7 ODI for UAE and scored 179 runs at an average of 25.57 his highest score was 70.
