= Charlie Lock =

Zimbabwean cricketer (born 1962)

Personal information
- Full name: Alan Charles Ingram Lock
- Born: 10 September 1962 (age 64); Marandellas, Mashonaland, Zimbabwe
- Batting: Right-handed
- Bowling: Right-arm fast-medium

International information
- National side: Zimbabwe
- Only Test (cap 28): 13 October 1995 v South Africa
- ODI debut (cap 43): 31 January 1996 v New Zealand
- Last ODI: 6 March 1996 v India

Career statistics
Competition	Test	ODI	FC	LA
Matches	1	8	11	10
Runs scored	8	8	74	8
Batting average	8.00	8.00	9.25	8.00
100s/50s	0/0	0/0	0/0	0/0
Top score	8*	5	16	5
Balls bowled	180	289	575	409
Wickets	5	8	32	9
Bowling average	21.00	27.37	24.96	30.11
5 wickets in innings	0	1	1	1
10 wickets in match	0	0	0	0
Best bowling	3/68	5/44	6/59	5/44
Catches/stumpings	0/–	1/–	5/–	1/–
- Source: CricInfo, 11 February 2006

Alan Charles Ingram Lock (born 10 September 1962) is a former Zimbabwean international cricketer who played one Test match and eight One Day Internationals.

Lock came to the attention of the world's media in early October 2007 when, as one of the remaining few hundred white farmers in Zimbabwe, he was driven off his land in the Headlands District, some 90 miles (140 km) south-east of Harare. Lock had previously given over a 5,000-acre (20 km^{2}) farm to the government for resettlement and had consequently received permission in 2003 to stay on a small parcel of land, Karori Farm. Lock brought a contempt of court application against the loss of his remaining land.
