= Flavian Aponso =

Sri Lankan cricketer

Personal information
- Full name: Goniamalimage John Anthony Flavian Aponso
- Born: 28 October 1952 (age 74); Colombo, Ceylon
- Batting: Left-handed
- Bowling: Right-arm offbreak
- Role: Top order Batsman

International information
- National side: Netherlands (1996-1996)
- ODI debut (cap 1): 17 February 1996 v New Zealand
- Last ODI: 5 March 1996 v South Africa

Career statistics
Competition	ODI	FC	LA
Matches	5	16	11
Runs scored	120	701	253
Batting average	30.00	24.17	25.30
100s/50s	0/1	0/4	0/1
Top score	58	92	58
Balls bowled	242	1,101	375
Wickets	2	17	6
Bowling average	128.50	28.35	55.33
5 wickets in innings	0	0	0
10 wickets in match	0	0	0
Best bowling	1/57	3/16	4/19
Catches/stumpings	0/0	10/0	0/0
- Source: Cricinfo, 15 May 2017

Goniamalimage John Anthony Flavian Aponso (born 28 October 1952), commonly as Flavian Aponso, is a former Sri Lankan first class and Dutch ODI cricketer, who played five One-day Internationals for The Netherlands during the 1996 World Cup. Aponso was the first ODI cap for Netherlands. He holds the unique distinction of representing both Sri Lanka and Netherlands at professional cricket.

== Career ==
Aponso's debut in cricket began when he represented his school, St. Sebastian's College, as team captain at school level competitions. He rose to the limelight after being selected to represent Sri Lanka at a school level to play against an Australian school cricket team in 1972.

Aponso represented Sri Lanka on one occasion before the country received Test status, playing against Tamil Nadu for the Gopalan Trophy in 1974–75. He was selected to the Sri Lankan national pool squads for the 1975 Cricket World Cup and 1979 Cricket World Cup but he was not chosen in the final squads of the respective tournaments.

His participation with the rebel Arosa Sri Lanka side that toured South Africa in 1982–83 ensured a lifetime ban from cricket in Sri Lanka. Prior to his ban from involving with Sri Lanka cricket, he came closer to maiden call-up at international level for Sri Lanka. He also went onto represent Air Lanka team in the 1993 World Airline tournament held in Malaysia which eventually won by Air Lanka. Aponso was also a member of the Sri Lanka masters squad which took part in World Masters cricket tournament in 1995.

He moved to the Netherlands, playing for them in the 1990 and 1994 ICC Trophy tournaments, though he also played nine top-level matches for Sebastianites in Sri Lankan domestic cricket. He became one of the mainstays with the Dutch cricket team for sometime usually batting at the top of the order and served as a part-time leg spinner.

Aponso made his debut World Cup appearance during the 1996 ICC Cricket World Cup representing Netherlands which Sri Lanka eventually won. He made his ODI debut for Netherlands during the World Cup tournament in a group stage match against New Zealand at Vadodara where his fellow Barbados based mate Nolan Clarke also made his ODI debut. Coincidentally, Nolan became the oldest ever debutant in ODI cricket at the age of 47 years and 227 days while Aponso was regarded as the then third oldest debutant to feature in an ODI at the age of 43 years and 112 days. Aponso is currently the fifth oldest player to have debuted in an ODI.

During one of the group stage matches of the 1996 World Cup, he also created a World Cup record for becoming the oldest ever batsman to score a fifty in a World Cup match at the age of 43 years and 121 days. His achievement came batting at no 5 against home side Pakistan at Lahore Gaddafi Stadium in tough conditions where he also registered his maiden ODI half-century smacking 3 fours and a six before being dismissed by Waqar Younis on 58 facing 105 deliveries. His crucial knock propelled Netherlands to 145/7 at the end of 50 overs but his efforts went in vain as Pakistan secured a comfortable eight wicket win in an easy run chase of just 146. He featured in all 5 matches for Netherlands during the 1996 World Cup scoring 120 runs at a modest average of 30 and at a below par strike rate, ending up as third leading runscorer for Netherlands during the tournament.

He retired from international cricket after the end of the 1996 Cricket World Cup. He established his career as a professional cricketer in the Netherlands over a period of 25 years before moving to the UK in 2005. After his retirement, Aponso moved into coaching and he now coaches the next generation at Harrow Saint Marys Cricket Club in Harrow, England.

In December 2013, he was reelected as the President of the Old Boys Association of the St. Sebastian's College, Moratuwa in UK.
