= 1989 English cricket season =

The 1989 English cricket season was the 90th in which the County Championship had been an official competition. Australia re-emerged as a world-class team having struggled for most of the previous 12 years. Under the leadership of Allan Border, a very fine team had been forged that included Steve Waugh, Mark Taylor, Ian Healy, David Boon and Merv Hughes. They regained the Ashes by defeating England 4–0. Worcestershire won the County Championship.

== Honours ==
- County Championship – Worcestershire
- NatWest Trophy – Warwickshire
- Sunday League – Lancashire
- Benson & Hedges Cup – Nottinghamshire
- Minor Counties Championship – Oxfordshire
- MCCA Knockout Trophy – Cumberland
- Second XI Championship – Middlesex II
- Wisden – Jimmy Cook, Dean Jones, Jack Russell, Robin Smith, Mark Taylor

== Test series ==
| Cumulative record – Test wins | 1876–1989 |
|---|---|
| England | 88 |
| Australia | 101 |
| Drawn | 80 |

== External sources ==
- CricketArchive – season and tournament itineraries

== Annual reviews ==
- Playfair Cricket Annual 1990
- Wisden Cricketers' Almanack 1990
