= Steven Lubbers =

Dutch cricketer

Personal information
- Full name: Steven Willem Lubbers
- Born: 24 March 1953 (age 73); Netherlands
- Batting: Right-handed
- Bowling: Right-arm off-break
- Role: Bowler

International information
- National side: Netherlands (1996)
- ODI debut (cap 8): 17 February 1996 v New Zealand
- Last ODI: 5 March 1996 v South Africa

Domestic team information
- Years: Team
- Hermes DVS

Career statistics
Competition	ODI	LA
Matches	4	5
Runs scored	24	58
Batting average	8.00	14.50
100s/50s	0/0	0/0
Top score	9	34
Balls bowled	216	288
Wickets	5	7
Bowling average	37.39	35.00
5 wickets in innings	0	0
10 wickets in match	0	0
Best bowling	3/48	3/48
Catches/stumpings	1/0	2/0
- Source: Cricinfo, 14 May 2017

Steven Willem Lubbers (born 24 April 1953) is a Dutch former all-round cricketer and the first ODI captain for the Netherlands. A right-handed batsman and right arm off-break bowler, Lubbers captained the national side for some years and was the first bowler to take a wicket for the Netherlands in a One Day International.

== Domestic career ==
Having appeared in minor matches for the Netherlands since 1972, Lubbers came to England in 1978 and played once for the Lancashire second XI and seven times for Derbyshire seconds, but failed to break through to the first team and never played first-class cricket, hindered by the fact that Dutch cricketers were back then considered overseas players, which was turned around a couple of years later.

== International career ==
His first internationals were in the 1979 ICC Trophy, in which he appeared three times without any particular success. He also did little in the 1982 competition, but in the 1986 tournament he took 12 wickets at 19.75 and scored a fifty against Canada.

He became captain of the Dutch team in 1988, playing in the side that hosted an England XI the following year and taking the wickets of John Stephenson and Alec Stewart in a shock three-run victory at Amstelveen in the first of the two matches. A reasonable 1990 ICC Trophy followed, and he led two tours of England in 1991 and 1992, playing a total of eight minor games against county opposition. The Dutch did not win any games on the tour, losing seven while one was ruined by rain.

A good 1994 ICC Trophy (310 runs at 44.28, 10 wickets at 22.00) saw Lubbers make three half-centuries, including 81 in the third-place play-off victory over Bermuda; in all three games where he passed 50, the Netherlands reached at least 250. In the 1995 NatWest Trophy match against Northamptonshire he had Alan Fordham caught and bowled for 99, although the Dutch still lost by seven wickets.

== Retirement ==
Lubbers ended his international career on a high note at the 1996 World Cup, where the Netherlands played their first ever ODIs. In the first of these, against New Zealand at Baroda, he took the first ever ODI wicket by a Dutchman when Craig Spearman was caught by Bas Zuiderent. (This was actually the second wicket to fall, as Nathan Astle had earlier been run out.) He struggled with batting, not scoring significant amounts in four attempts. His final game for his country was against South Africa, where Lubbers scored 2 not out and conceded 50 runs from eight wicketless overs as South Africa crushed the Dutch by 160 runs at Rawalpindi.

== After cricket ==
Lubbers now works as a gymnastics teacher at a Deventer high school named Etty Hillesum Lyceum De Boerhaave.

In 2021 he was made a Knight of the Order of Oranje-Nassau.

== Sports family ==
Steven Lubbers is the father of Dutch Olympic rower Reinder Lubbers.
