= 1991 English cricket season =

The 1991 English cricket season was the 92nd in which the County Championship had been an official competition. West Indies and England drew 2–2 in the main Test series. Sri Lanka also toured England and played one Test which England won. The Britannic Assurance County Championship was won by Essex.

== Honours ==
- County Championship – Essex
- NatWest Trophy – Hampshire
- Sunday League – Nottinghamshire
- Benson & Hedges Cup – Worcestershire
- Minor Counties Championship – Staffordshire
- MCCA Knockout Trophy – Staffordshire
- Second XI Championship – Yorkshire II
- Wisden – Curtly Ambrose, Phillip DeFreitas, Allan Donald, Richie Richardson, Waqar Younis

== External sources ==
- CricketArchive – season and tournament itineraries

== Annual reviews ==
- Playfair Cricket Annual 1992
- Wisden Cricketers' Almanack 1992
