= Floris Jansen =

Dutch cricketer (born 1962)

Personal information
- Full name: Floris Jansen
- Born: 10 June 1962 (age 64); Netherlands
- Batting: Right-handed
- Bowling: Right-arm medium

International information
- National side: Netherlands (1996)
- ODI debut (cap 12): 22 February 1996 v England
- Last ODI: 26 February 1996 v Pakistan

Domestic team information
- Years: Team
- Kampong
- Voorburg CC

Career statistics
Competition	ODI	List A
Matches	2	3
Runs scored	–	5
Batting average	–	–
100s/50s	–	0/0
Top score	–	5*
Balls bowled	54	125
Wickets	1	1
Bowling average	62.00	130.00
5 wickets in innings	0	0
10 wickets in match	0	0
Best bowling	1/40	1/40
Catches/stumpings	1/–	1/–
- Source: Cricinfo, 13 May 2017

Floris Jansen (born 10 June 1962) is a Dutch former cricketer. He played two One Day Internationals for the Netherlands. Both the matches, against Pakistan, were within five days of each other in February 1996.
