= Robert van Oosterom =

Dutch cricketer (born 1968)

Personal information
- Full name: Robert Frank van Oosterom
- Born: 16 October 1968 (age 58); The Hague, Netherlands
- Batting: Right-handed
- Relatives: Robyn van Oosterom (daughter)

International information
- National side: Netherlands (1996–2002)
- ODI debut (cap 13): 1 March 1996 v United Arab Emirates
- Last ODI: 16 September 2002 v Sri Lanka

Career statistics
Competition	ODI	LA
Matches	3	16
Runs scored	7	182
Batting average	7.00	15.16
100s/50s	0/0	0/2
Top score	5*	60
Catches/stumpings	2/–	7/–
- Source: ESPNcricinfo, 19 May 2017

Robert van Oosterom (born 16 October 1968) is a Dutch former cricketer. A right-handed batsman, Van Oosterom usually batted in the middle order.

He began playing for the Netherlands in 1990, in the ICC Trophy match against Israel. His last appearance for the national side was in 2002.

== Sources ==
- Robert van Oosterom at Cricinfo
