= Dipak Chudasama =

Kenyan cricketer (born 1963)

Personal information
- Full name: Dipak Nanalal Chudasama
- Born: 20 May 1963 (age 63); Mombasa, Kenya
- Batting: Right-handed

International information
- National side: Kenya (1996–1999)
- ODI debut (cap 2): 18 February 1996 v India
- Last ODI: 30 May 1999 v Sri Lanka

Career statistics
Competition	ODI	LA
Matches	20	20
Runs scored	434	434
Batting average	22.84	22.84
100s/50s	1/1	1/1
Top score	122	122
Catches/stumpings	4/0	4/0
- Source: Cricinfo, 5 May 2017

Dipak Nanalal Chudasama (born 20 May 1963) is a Kenyan former cricketer of Indian Gujarati origin. He was a right-handed batsman. Known as "The Doc", as he is a qualified orthodontist, Chudasama was the first Kenyan player to score an international century.

== International career ==
Having made his debut in 1980, Chudasama represented Kenya at the 1996 World Cup, and the 1990, 1994 and 1997 ICC Trophies. In all, he played in 20 One-Day International matches.

His top score was a stylish 122 against Bangladesh in Nairobi, a then-record opening partnership for Kenya. Chudasama has toured several countries in Asia and Africa, as well as Holland.

== Beyond cricket ==
Outside of playing cricket, Chudasama also represented Kenya at the 1982 Commonwealth Table Tennis Championships in Bombay, India.

Following his professional career, Chudasama went on to become a well known orthodontist based in Coppell, Texas. He also taught Orthodontics at Jacksonville University for several years prior to opening his practice.
