= Eric Gouka =

Dutch cricketer (born 1970)

Personal information
- Full name: Eric Laurentius Gouka
- Batting: Right-handed
- Bowling: Right-arm medium

International information
- National side: Netherlands (1996-1996)
- ODI debut (cap 6): 17 February 1996 v New Zealand
- Last ODI: 5 March 1996 v South Africa

Career statistics
| Competition | ODI | LA |
|---|---|---|
| Matches | 3 | 5 |
| Runs scored | 19 | 36 |
| Batting average | 19.00 | 18.00 |
| 100s/50s | 0/0 | 0/0 |
| Top score | 19 | 19 |
| Balls bowled | 22 | 34 |
| Wickets | 1 | 2 |
| Bowling average | 51.00 | 30.50 |
| 5 wickets in innings | 0 | 0 |
| 10 wickets in match | 0 | 0 |
| Best bowling | 1/32 | 1/10 |
| Catches/stumpings | 0/– | 1/– |
- Source: Cricinfo, 15 May 2017

Eric Laurentius Gouka (born 29 January 1970) is a Dutch former international cricketer. He played three One Day Internationals for the Netherlands, the last of which was in March 1996 against South Africa.
