= Tim de Leede =

Dutch cricketer (born 1968)

Personal information
- Full name: Timotheus Bernardus Maria de Leede
- Born: 25 January 1968 (age 58); Leidschendam, South Holland, Netherlands
- Batting: Right-handed
- Bowling: Right-arm medium
- Relatives: Frans de Leede (father); Bas de Leede (son); Babette de Leede (niece)

International information
- National side: Netherlands (1996–2007)
- ODI debut (cap 5): 17 February 1996 v New Zealand
- Last ODI: 22 March 2007 v Scotland
- ODI shirt no.: 5

Career statistics
Competition	ODI	FC	LA
Matches	29	1	62
Runs scored	400	23	959
Batting average	16.66	11.50	18.80
100s/50s	0/2	0/0	0/5
Top score	58*	23	74
Balls bowled	1,139	78	1,992
Wickets	29	0	54
Bowling average	34.44	–	30.90
5 wickets in innings	0	–	0
10 wickets in match	0	–	0
Best bowling	4/35	–	4/35
Catches/stumpings	7/–	0/–	19/–
- Source: Cricinfo, 28 February 2018

Timotheus Bernardus Maria de Leede (born 25 January 1968) is a Dutch former cricketer whose One Day International (ODI) career for the Dutch national team lasted 11 years. A right-handed all-rounder, he played for the Netherlands at the 1996, 2003, and 2007 World Cups.

== Coaching career ==
In January 2015, de Leede was appointed as the head coach of the France national cricket team. He coached the team at the 2015 European Twenty20 Championship. He is coaching several Dutch Lions and other national teams.

== Personal life ==
De Leede's grandparents were among the first to open a supermarket in the Netherlands. His father Frans played club cricket before becoming an umpire. He has six children. His oldest son, Bas de Leede, plays cricket for the Netherlands. His youngest son Tom plays for The Netherlands U19. His niece Babette de Leede plays for the women's national cricket team.

He worked for a Dutch telecom company, and usually had to take vacation time or unpaid leave to play in cricket tournaments. As of 2023, he owns and manages a cricket equipment store in Nootdorp and is a respected cricket coach.

== Sources ==
- Tim de Leede at Cricinfo
