= Nolan Clarke =

West Indian cricketer (born 1948)

Personal information
- Full name: Nolan Ewatt Clarke
- Born: 22 June 1948 (age 78); Saint Michael, Barbados
- Batting: Right-handed
- Bowling: Legbreak googly
- Role: Batsman

International information
- National side: Netherlands
- ODI debut (cap 4): 17 February 1996 v New Zealand
- Last ODI: 5 March 1996 v South Africa

Career statistics
Competition	ODI	FC	LA
Matches	5	26	8
Runs scored	50	1,331	185
Batting average	10.00	31.69	23.12
100s/50s	0/0	2/6	0/1
Top score	32	159	86
Balls bowled	–	60	54
Wickets	–	0	2
Bowling average	–	–	17.50
5 wickets in innings	–	–	0
10 wickets in match	–	–	0
Best bowling	–	–	2/35
Catches/stumpings	3/–	27/–	4/–
- Source: ESPNcricinfo, 14 May 2017

Nolan Ewatt Clarke (born 22 June 1948) is a Barbados-born Dutch former cricketer. A big-hitting right-handed batsman, Clarke played five One Day Internationals for the Netherlands in the 1996 Cricket World Cup. At the age of 47, he was the oldest cricketer to play in the World Cup. He once topped the six hitting tally in the Hong Kong Sixes, a tournament that included Brian Lara.

== Education ==
Clarke was educated at St Michael's parish, the same school that West Indian cricketers Vanburn Holder and David Murray went to.

== Domestic career ==
He represented Barbados in first-class cricket from 1970 until 1978 and played 26 games for them in total. His highest first-class score of 159 was against Mike Denness's touring England side in 1973–74.

He then began coaching in the Netherlands and played for Quick Haag before moving to Sparta 1888 in Rotterdam. His score of 265 not out for Quick against Bloemendaal in 1990 remains the highest score ever made in Dutch domestic cricket.

In 1995, he made 86 for the Netherlands in a NatWest Trophy game against Northamptonshire.

== International career ==
When the Netherlands qualified for the 1996 World Cup, Clarke was heavily influential in getting them there, having made 121 not out against Bermuda in a crucial 1994 ICC Trophy play-off match.

Clarke played in all five of the Netherlands' World Cup matches as an opening batsman, though he scored only 50 runs at an average of 10. He did, however, achieve two records: in the first match he became, at the age of 47 years and 240 days, both the oldest One Day International debutant and player in history. He beat the previous record for oldest debutant, held by England's Norman Gifford, by almost three years, and the previous record for oldest player, held by Zimbabwe's John Traicos, by almost two years.

In 2005 Clarke returned to cricket at the age of 56 to play for VVV Amsterdam in the Hoofdklasse and after a gap of six years, he hit 782 runs. He also aired trenchant opinions on the state of cricket in the Netherlands.

Clarke has retired from playing, but remains active as a coach in the Dutch youth programme.
