= Peter Cantrell =

Dutch cricketer (born 1962)

Personal information
- Full name: Peter Edward Cantrell
- Born: 28 October 1962 (age 64); Gunnedah, New South Wales, Australia
- Nickname: Crazy
- Batting: Right-handed
- Bowling: Right-arm offbreak
- Role: Opening Batsman, Coach

International information
- National side: Netherlands (1996)
- ODI debut (cap 3): 17 February 1996 v New Zealand
- Last ODI: 5 March 1996 v South Africa

Domestic team information
- Years: Team
- Kampong
- Queensland

Career statistics
Competition	ODI	FC	LA
Matches	5	34	20
Runs scored	160	1,827	542
Batting average	32.00	32.62	27.10
100s/50s	0/0	3/11	1/0
Top score	47	176*	100
Balls bowled	186	3,411	643
Wickets	3	27	10
Bowling average	56.66	63.00	50.40
5 wickets in innings	0	0	0
10 wickets in match	0	0	0
Best bowling	1/18	4/52	2/39
Catches/stumpings	0/0	43/0	6/0
- Source: Cricinfo, 15 May 2017

Peter Edward Cantrell (born 28 October 1962) is a Dutch former cricketer. He has represented Queensland in the Australian domestic circuit.

== Domestic career ==
He also played 33 first class matches for Queensland and once for an Australian XI.

Cantrell is best remembered as a substitute fielder who took two catches during the Australia v England Test match at the Gabba during the 1990-91 Ashes series. In spite of the fact that Cantrell had apparently been at a nightclub until 3am that morning, one of these catches, which dismissed one of England's few batsmen in form at the time, Alec Stewart, has been described as a "blinder". England duly collapsed and lost by ten wickets in this the first Test, on their way to another heavy defeat in the series. ESPNCricinfo observes that, in an ironic partial anticipation of the Gary Pratt controversy of 2005, "Cantrell's presence was slightly controversial, given that he was probably the best gully fielder in Australia at the time and that the less sure-fingered Carl Rackemann was the official 12th man".

Two and a half years later, Cantrell helped to defeat "England" again, this time for a different international team, when he starred in a surprise seven-wicket win for the Netherlands over an England XI which included Darren Gough and then test players Nasser Hussain and Martin McCague, Cantrell scoring 64 and taking 2 for 40.

This however was not in a one-day international and he had to wait another three years for his official international debut.

== International career ==
He played all five of his One Day Internationals for The Netherlands during the 1996 World Cup. He scored 160 runs in the five ODIs, with a decent average of 32.

== Coaching career ==
He was coach of the Netherlands for the 2007 World Cup but stood down as head coach after the tournament, citing difficulties managing coaching and his job as a golf instructor.
