= International cricket in 2006–07 =

Cricket season

International cricket in the 2006–07 cricket season is defined by major statisticians, such as CricketArchive and Wisden, as those matches played on tours that started between September 2006 and April 2007. Two major ICC tournaments are scheduled for this season, with the Champions Trophy played in October in India, and the World Cup taking place in West Indies in March. In addition, England will defend the Ashes when they go to Australia in November, and all the ten Test nations will be in action during November and December – though Zimbabwe, who are playing Bangladesh during this time, withdrew from Test matches throughout 2006 and will thus only be playing One-day International matches.

== Season overview ==
International tours
Start date	Home team	Away team	Results [Matches]		
Start date	Home team	Away team	Test	ODI	T20I
15 September 2006	South Africa	Zimbabwe	—	3–0 [3]	—
11 November 2006	Pakistan	West Indies	2–0 [3]	3–1 [5]	—
19 November 2006	South Africa	India	2–1 [3]	4–0 [5]	0–1 [1]
23 November 2006	Australia	England	5–0 [5]	—	1–0 [1]
28 November 2006	Bangladesh	Zimbabwe	—	5–0 [5]	1–0 [1]
7 December 2006	New Zealand	Sri Lanka	1–1 [2]	2–2 [5]	1–1 [2]
15 December 2006	Bangladesh	Scotland	—	2–0 [2]	—
11 January 2007	South Africa	Pakistan	2–1 [3]	3–1 [5]	1–0 [1]
21 January 2007	India	West Indies	—	3–1 [4]	—
4 February 2007	Zimbabwe	Bangladesh	—	1–3 [4]	—
8 February 2007	India	Sri Lanka	—	2–1 [4]	—
16 February 2007	New Zealand	Australia	—	3–0 [3]	—
International tournaments
Dates	Tournament			Winners	
12 September 2006	(Malaysia) DLF Cup			Australia	
7 October 2006	(India) ICC Champions Trophy			Australia	
12 January 2007	(Australia) Commonwealth Bank Series			England	
13 March 2007	(Cricket West Indies) World Cup			Australia	
Minor tours
Start date	Home team	Away team	Results [Matches]		
Start date	Home team	Away team	First-class		List A
11 November 2006	Kenya	Bermuda	—		3–0 [3]
Minor tournaments
Dates	Tournament			Winners	
26 November 2006	(South Africa) Associates Triangular Series			Netherlands	
17 January 2007	(Kenya) Associates Triangular Series			Kenya	
29 January 2007	(Kenya) ICC World Cricket League Division One			Kenya	
25 February 2007	(Cricket West Indies) Associates Triangular Series			Bangladesh	

== Pre-season rankings ==
ICC Test Championship 21 August 2006
Pos	Nation	Matches	Points	Rating
1	Australia	33	4793	130
2	England	41	4864	119
3	Pakistan	30	3363	112
4	India	34	3780	111
5	Sri Lanka	33	3410	103
6	South Africa	34	3182	94
7	New Zealand	25	2293	92
8	West Indies	29	2080	72
9	Zimbabwe	15	415	28
10	Bangladesh	22	48	2

ICC ODI Championship 10 September 2006
Pos	Nation	Points
1	Australia	131
2	South Africa	123
3	India	113
4	Pakistan	111
5	New Zealand	111
6	Sri Lanka	107
7	West Indies	99
8	England	99
9	Zimbabwe	35
10	Bangladesh	33
11	Kenya	0

== September ==
=== DLF Cup ===
The Board of Control for Cricket in India has announced that India, Australia and West Indies will take part in a triangular series held at the Kinrara Academy Oval in Kuala Lumpur. The West Indies Cricket Board were in a payment conflict with the West Indies Players' Association about this series, as the WIPA claims it was not informed before the WICB agreed to the matches, but a deal was eventually agreed in early August. The tournament was known as the DLF Cup, the second ODI tournament to be known by this name, following April's India v Pakistan series in the UAE.

Team	Pld	W	L	NR	Pts	NRR
Australia	4	2	1	1	11	+0.55
West Indies	4	2	2	0	9	−0.31
India	4	1	2	1	6	−0.26

No.	Date	Team 1	Captain	Team 2	Captain	Venue	Result
Group stage
ODI 2413	12 September	Australia	Ricky Ponting	West Indies	Brian Lara	Kinrara Academy Oval, Kuala Lumpur	Australia by 78 runs
ODI 2414	14 September	India	Rahul Dravid	West Indies	Brian Lara	Kinrara Academy Oval, Kuala Lumpur	West Indies by 29 runs (D/L)
ODI 2416	16 September	Australia	Ricky Ponting	India	Rahul Dravid	Kinrara Academy Oval, Kuala Lumpur	No result
ODI 2417	18 September	Australia	Michael Hussey	West Indies	Brian Lara	Kinrara Academy Oval, Kuala Lumpur	West Indies by 3 wickets
ODI 2419	20 September	India	Rahul Dravid	West Indies	Brian Lara	Kinrara Academy Oval, Kuala Lumpur	India by 16 runs
ODI 2421	22 September	Australia	Ricky Ponting	India	Rahul Dravid	Kinrara Academy Oval, Kuala Lumpur	Australia by 18 runs
Final
ODI 2422	24 September	Australia	Ricky Ponting	West Indies	Brian Lara	Kinrara Academy Oval, Kuala Lumpur	Australia by 127 runs

=== Zimbabwe in South Africa ===
Zimbabwe made a one-week tour of South Africa as warm-up to the Champions Trophy. They lost all four matches on tour, three ODIs to South Africa and a Twenty20 match with domestic side Eagles.

No.	Date	Home captain	Away captain	Venue	Result
ODI series
ODI 2415	15 September	Prosper Utseya	Jacques Kallis	Goodyear Park, Blomfontein	South Africa by 5 wickets
ODI 2418	17 September	Prosper Utseya	Jacques Kallis	Buffalo Park, East London	South Africa by 6 wickets
ODI 2420	20 September	Prosper Utseya	Jacques Kallis	Sedgars Park, Potchefstroom	South Africa by 171 runs

== October ==
=== Champions Trophy ===
The 2006 ICC Champions Trophy was held in India from 7 October to 5 November 2006. It was the fifth edition of the ICC Champions Trophy (previously known as the ICC Knock-out). The tournament venue was not confirmed until mid-2005 when the Indian government agreed that tournament revenues would be free from tax (the 2002 tournament had been due to be held in India, but was switched to Sri Lanka when an exemption from tax in India was not granted). Australia won the tournament, their first Champions Trophy victory. They were the only team to only get one loss in the tournament, as all other teams lost at least two matches. West Indies, their final opponents, beat Australia in the group stage, but were bowled out for 138 in the final and lost by eight wickets on the Duckworth–Lewis method. West Indies opening batsman Chris Gayle was named Player of the Tournament.

==== Preliminary round ====
Pos	Team	Pld	W	L	T	NR	Pts	NRR
1	Sri Lanka	3	3	0	0	0	6	2.672
2	West Indies	3	2	1	0	0	4	0.404
3	Bangladesh	3	1	2	0	0	2	0.019
4	Zimbabwe	3	0	3	0	0	0	−2.927

Source: EspnCricinfo

No.	Date	Team 1	Captain	Team 2	Captain	Venue	Result
Preliminary round
ODI 2423	7 October	Sri Lanka	Mahela Jayawardene	Bangladesh	Habibul Bashar	Punjab C.A. Stadium, Mohali	Sri Lanka by 37 runs
ODI 2424	8 October	West Indies	Brian Lara	Zimbabwe	Prosper Utseya	Sardar Patel Stadium, Ahmedabad	West Indies by 9 wickets
ODI 2425	10 October	Sri Lanka	Mahela Jayawardene	Zimbabwe	Prosper Utseya	Sardar Patel Stadium, Ahmedabad	Sri Lanka by 144 runs
ODI 2426	11 October	West Indies	Brian Lara	Bangladesh	Habibul Bashar	Sawai Mansingh Stadium, Jaipur	West Indies by 10 wickets
ODI 2427	13 October	Bangladesh	Habibul Bashar	Zimbabwe	Prosper Utseya	Sawai Mansingh Stadium, Jaipur	Bangladesh by 101 runs
ODI 2428	14 October	Sri Lanka	Mahela Jayawardene	West Indies	Brian Lara	Brabourne Stadium, Mumbai	Sri Lanka by 9 wickets

==== Group stage ====
Group A
Pos	Team	Pld	W	L	T	NR	Pts	NRR
1	Australia	3	2	1	0	0	4	0.529
2	West Indies	3	2	1	0	0	4	0.009
3	India	3	1	2	0	0	2	0.482
4	England	3	1	2	0	0	2	−1.044

Source: EspnCricinfo

Group B
Pos	Team	Pld	W	L	T	NR	Pts	NRR
1	South Africa	3	2	1	0	0	4	0.767
2	New Zealand	3	2	1	0	0	4	0.572
3	Sri Lanka	3	1	2	0	0	2	−0.195
4	Pakistan	3	1	2	0	0	2	−1.107

Source: EspnCricinfo

No.	Group	Date	Team 1	Captain	Team 2	Captain	Venue	Result
Group stage
ODI 2429	A	15 October	India	Rahul Dravid	England	Andrew Flintoff	Sawai Mansingh Stadium, Jaipur	India by 4 wickets
ODI 2430	B	16 October	New Zealand	Stephen Fleming	South Africa	Graeme Smith	Brabourne Stadium, Mumbai	New Zealand by 87 runs
ODI 2431	B	17 October	Pakistan	Younis Khan	Sri Lanka	Mahela Jayawardene	Sawai Mansingh Stadium, Jaipur	Pakistan by 4 wickets
ODI 2432	A	18 October	Australia	Ricky Ponting	West Indies	Brian Lara	Brabourne Stadium, Mumbai	West Indies by 10 runs
ODI 2433	B	20 October	New Zealand	Stephen Fleming	Sri Lanka	Mahela Jayawardene	Brabourne Stadium, Mumbai	Sri Lanka by 7 wickets
ODI 2434	A	21 October	Australia	Ricky Ponting	England	Andrew Flintoff	Sawai Mansingh Stadium, Jaipur	Australia by 6 wickets
ODI 2435	B	24 October	South Africa	Graeme Smith	Sri Lanka	Mahela Jayawardene	Sardar Patel Stadium, Ahmedabad	South Africa by 78 Runs
ODI 2436	B	25 October	New Zealand	Stephen Fleming	Pakistan	Younis Khan	Punjab C.A. Stadium, Mohali	New Zealand by 51 runs
ODI 2437	A	26 October	India	Rahul Dravid	West Indies	Brian Lara	Sardar Patel Stadium, Ahmedabad	West Indies by 3 wickets
ODI 2438	B	27 October	Pakistan	Younis Khan	South Africa	Graeme Smith	Punjab C.A. Stadium, Mohali	South Africa by 124 runs
ODI 2439	A	28 October	England	Andrew Flintoff	West Indies	Brian Lara	Sardar Patel Stadium, Ahmedabad	England by 3 wickets
ODI 2440	A	29 October	India	Rahul Dravid	Australia	Ricky Ponting	Punjab C.A. Stadium, Mohali	Australia by 6 wickets

==== Knockout stage ====
No.	Date	Team 1	Captain	Team 2	Captain	Venue	Result
Semi–finals
ODI 2441	1 November	Australia	Ricky Ponting	New Zealand	Stephen Fleming	Punjab C.A. Stadium, Mohali	Australia by 34 runs
ODI 2442	2 November	West Indies	Brian Lara	South Africa	Graeme Smith	Sawai Mansingh Stadium, Jaipur	West Indies by 6 wickets
Final
ODI 2443	5 November	Australia	Ricky Ponting	West Indies	Brian Lara	Punjab C.A. Stadium, Mohali	Australia by 8 wickets (D/L)

=== New Zealand Women in Australia ===
New Zealand Women are scheduled to tour Australia in October. The series begins on 18 October, and consists of one Twenty20 international and five One-day Internationals. Australia have made one change to their squad since beating India in February, with Leah Poulton replacing the injured Alex Blackwell. Australia won the series 5–0, though the first three matches came down to the last over.

== November ==
=== Afro–Asia Cup ===
The second Afro–Asia Cup was set to involve the African Cricket Association XI take on the Asian Cricket Council XI playing each other in a series of One Day Internationals, but was postponed until June 2007.

=== ICC Intercontinental Cup ===
The 2006 Intercontinental Cup continues into this season, with a November match between Kenya and Bermuda. The details are given under the 2006 season.

=== West Indies in Pakistan ===
West Indies played three Tests and five One-day Internationals in Pakistan. The tour clashed with a date for a Twenty20 match organised by Allen Stanford, but that game was eventually cancelled and the tour went ahead. In the Test series, Mohammad Yousuf passed Viv Richards' record of most runs in a calendar year, finishing the year with 1,788 Test runs, 665 of which came in this three-match series. Pakistan took a two-nil lead in the ODI series before losing captain Inzamam-ul-Haq to injury, and Marlon Samuels helped West Indies outscore Pakistan with his unbeaten century in the fourth match.

No.	Date	Home captain	Away captain	Venue	Result
Test series
Test 1815	11–15 November	Brian Lara	Inzamam-ul-Haq	Gaddafi Stadium, Lahore	Pakistan by 9 wickets
Test 1816	19–23 November	Brian Lara	Inzamam-ul-Haq	Multan Cricket Stadium, Multan	Match drawn
Test 1818	27 November – 1 December	Brian Lara	Inzamam-ul-Haq	National Stadium, Karachi	Pakistan by 199 runs
ODI series
ODI 2458a	5 December	Brian Lara	Younis Khan	Rawalpindi Cricket Stadium, Rawalpindi	Match abandoned
ODI 2460	7 December	Brian Lara	Inzamam-ul-Haq	Iqbal Stadium, Faisalabad	Pakistan by 2 wickets
ODI 2463	10 December	Brian Lara	Inzamam-ul-Haq	Gaddafi Stadium, Lahore	Pakistan by 7 wickets (D/L)
ODI 2464	13 December	Brian Lara	Abdul Razzaq	Multan Cricket Stadium, Multan	West Indies by 7 wickets
ODI 2466	16 December	Brian Lara	Inzamam-ul-Haq	National Stadium, Karachi	Pakistan by 7 wickets

=== Bermuda in Kenya ===
Bermuda visited Kenya for three One Day Internationals at the Mombasa Sports Club between 11 and 14 November. The match follows their meeting at the Intercontinental Cup, which was drawn after the final two days of the game were called off due to pitch conditions. Kenya ended up winning all three matches; Bermuda's highest score of the series was 201 in 50 overs, while Kenya's lowest was 186 in 37.5 overs chasing a target in the second match. Martin Williamson, managing editor of Cricinfo, commented that Kenya "outbatted and outbowled Bermuda, and...looked the more professional side in the field". Dwayne Leverock, Bermuda, and Thomas Odoyo, Kenya, took the most wickets in the series with seven, while Steve Tikolo made 111 in the final ODI to lead the runs tally with 214. Apart from Tikolo, only Tanmay Mishra, Kenya, and Dean Minors, Bermuda, made more than 100 runs in the three matches.

No.	Date	Home captain	Away captain	Venue	Result
ODI series
ODI 2444	11 November	Steve Tikolo	Irvine Romaine	Mombasa Sports Club, Mombasa	Kenya by 79 runs
ODI 2445	12 November	Steve Tikolo	Irvine Romaine	Mombasa Sports Club, Mombasa	Kenya by 7 wickets
ODI 2446	14 November	Steve Tikolo	Irvine Romaine	Mombasa Sports Club, Mombasa	Kenya by 104 runs

=== India in South Africa ===
India played their first tour game in South Africa on 16 November. The tour will last until 6 January, when the third and final Test at Newlands is scheduled to finish.

In the ODI series, India only once managed to bat through the 50 overs once in four completed games, six of the seven highest scores were made by South Africans, and the five highest batting averages in the series were registered by South Africans. Of the six bowlers to take more than five wickets, five of them were South African. Thus, South Africa won the ODI series 4–0. India also played their first Twenty20 International, winning with one ball and six wickets remaining.

No.	Date	Home captain	Away captain	Venue	Result
ODI series
ODI 2446a	19 November	Graeme Smith	Rahul Dravid	New Wanderers Stadium, Johannesburg	Match abandoned
ODI 2447	22 November	Graeme Smith	Rahul Dravid	Kingsmead, Durban	South Africa by 157 runs
ODI 2449	26 November	Graeme Smith	Rahul Dravid	Newlands, Cape Town	South Africa by 106 runs
ODI 2452	29 November	Graeme Smith	Virender Sehwag	St George's Park, Port Elizabeth	South Africa by 80 runs
ODI 2458	3 December	Graeme Smith	Virender Sehwag	SuperSport Park, Centurion	South Africa by 9 wickets
Only T20I
T20I 10	1 December	Graeme Smith	Virender Sehwag	New Wanderers Stadium, Johannesburg	India by 6 wickets
Test series
Test 1823	15–19 December	Graeme Smith	Rahul Dravid	New Wanderers Stadium, Johannesburg	India by 123 runs
Test 1825	26–30 December	Graeme Smith	Rahul Dravid	Kingsmead, Durban	South Africa by 174 runs
Test 1827	2–6 January	Graeme Smith	Rahul Dravid	Newlands, Cape Town	South Africa by 5 wickets

=== England in Australia ===
England arrived in Australia on 10 November, and played their first Test on 23 November. The Boxing Day Test will be the fourth of the series, which concluded on 6 January. The tour also includes a Twenty20 International at the SCG, and the VB Series. The tour also includes several exhibition matches between England and local Australian squads.

Australia won the series 5–0, the first whitewash in 86 years, since 1920–21. Glenn McGrath, Justin Langer and Shane Warne all retired from Test cricket after the final game at the SCG.

No.	Date	Home captain	Away captain	Venue	Result
Test series
Test 1817	23–27 November	Ricky Ponting	Andrew Flintoff	The Gabba, Brisbane	Australia by 277 runs
Test 1819	1–5 December	Ricky Ponting	Andrew Flintoff	Adelaide Oval, Adelaide	Australia by 6 wickets
Test 1821	14–18 December	Ricky Ponting	Andrew Flintoff	WACA Ground, Perth	Australia by 206 runs
Test 1824	26–30 December	Ricky Ponting	Andrew Flintoff	Melbourne Cricket Ground, Melbourne	Australia by an innings and 99 runs
Test 1826	2–6 January	Ricky Ponting	Andrew Flintoff	Sydney Cricket Ground, Sydney	Australia by 10 wickets
Only T20I
T20I 13	9 January	Ricky Ponting	Andrew Flintoff	Sydney Cricket Ground, Sydney	Australia by 77 runs

=== Associates South Africa Tri-Series ===
Bermuda, Canada and Netherlands played a six-match triangular series in South Africa during November and December. Bermuda continued their losing streak, losing their three first matches before bowling Netherlands out for 91 in the sixth and final ODI to win the game. Netherlands, however, had already won three games and the triangular series. Canada finished as runners-up, beating Bermuda in both matches but losing by one wicket in the final game against the Netherlands, where Billy Stelling and Mark Jonkman put on 27 off 20 balls for the last wicket as the Dutch chased 205 in 42 overs.

Team	Pld	W	L	NR	Pts	NRR
Netherlands	4	3	1	0	13	−0.423
Canada	4	2	2	0	9	+0.242
Bermuda	4	1	3	0	5	+0.166

No.	Date	Team 1	Captain	Team 2	Captain	Venue	Result
ODI series
ODI 2448	26 November	Canada	George Codrington	Netherlands	Luuk van Troost	Sedgars Park, Potchefstroom	Netherlands by 17 runs
ODI 2450	27 November	Bermuda	Irvine Romaine	Canada	George Codrington	Sedgars Park, Potchefstroom	Canada by 5 wickets
ODI 2451	28 November	Bermuda	Irvine Romaine	Netherlands	Luuk van Troost	Sedgars Park, Potchefstroom	Netherlands by 8 wickets
ODI 2452	30 November	Bermuda	Irvine Romaine	Canada	George Codrington	Willowmoore Park, Benoni	Canada by 3 wickets
ODI 2455	1 December	Canada	George Codrington	Netherlands	Luuk van Troost	Willowmoore Park, Benoni	Netherlands by 1 wicket (D/L)
ODI 2456	2 December	Bermuda	Irvine Romaine	Netherlands	Luuk van Troost	Willowmoore Park, Benoni	Bermuda by 6 wickets

=== Zimbabwe in Bangladesh ===
Zimbabwe had said they would not play any Tests 2006, so this tour of Bangladesh only included One-day Internationals. They did not win any of their six matches against Bangladesh, losing the Twenty20 International as well as five successive ODIs.

No.	Date	Home captain	Away captain	Venue	Result
Only T20I
T20I 9	28 November	Shahriar Nafees	Prosper Utseya	Khulna Divisional Stadium, Khulna	Bangladesh by 43 runs
ODI series
ODI 2453	30 November	Habibul Bashar	Prosper Utseya	Khulna Divisional Stadium, Khulna	Bangladesh by 9 wickets
ODI 2457	3 December	Habibul Bashar	Prosper Utseya	Shaheed Chandu Stadium, Bogra	Bangladesh by 6 wickets
ODI 2459	5 December	Habibul Bashar	Prosper Utseya	Shaheed Chandu Stadium, Bogra	Bangladesh by 26 runs
ODI 2461	8 December	Habibul Bashar	Prosper Utseya	Sher-e-Bangla Cricket Stadium, Dhaka	Bangladesh by 8 wickets
ODI 2462	10 December	Habibul Bashar	Prosper Utseya	Sher-e-Bangla Cricket Stadium, Dhaka	Bangladesh by 3 wickets

== December ==
=== Sri Lanka in New Zealand ===
Sri Lanka visit New Zealand for the third consecutive summer, this time playing a series of two Tests, five One-day Internationals and two Twenty20 Internationals.

Sri Lankans in New Zealand in 2006–07. 2-Test series drawn 1–1. Twenty20 International series 1–1. ODI series 2–2

No.	Date	Home captain	Away captain	Venue	Result
Test series
Test 1820	7–11 December	Stephen Fleming	Mahela Jayawardene	Jade Stadium, Christchurch	New Zealand by 5 wickets
Test 1822	15–19 December	Stephen Fleming	Mahela Jayawardene	Basin Reserve, Wellington	Sri Lanka by 217 runs
T20I series
T20I 11	22 December	Stephen Fleming	Mahela Jayawardene	Westpac Stadium, Wellington	Sri Lanka by 18 runs (D/L)
T20I 12	26 December	Stephen Fleming	Mahela Jayawardene	Eden Park, Auckland	New Zealand by 5 wickets
ODI series
ODI 2468	28 December	Daniel Vettori	Mahela Jayawardene	McLean Park, Napier	Sri Lanka by 7 wickets
ODI 2469	31 December	Daniel Vettori	Mahela Jayawardene	Queenstown Events Centre, Queenstown	New Zealand by 1 wicket
ODI 2470	2 January	Daniel Vettori	Mahela Jayawardene	Jade Stadium, Christchurch	New Zealand by 4 wickets (D/L)
ODI 2471	6 January	Stephen Fleming	Mahela Jayawardene	Eden Park, Auckland	Sri Lanka by 189 runs
ODI 2472a	9 January	Stephen Fleming	Mahela Jayawardene	Seddon Park, Hamilton	Match abandoned

=== Scotland in Bangladesh ===
The Associate member Scotland toured Bangladesh for two One-day Internationals in December, and lost both matches. They also lost a warmup match to the Bangladesh Cricket Board's Academy team.

Scottish in Bangladesh in 2006–07. Bangladesh won 2-ODI series 2–0.

No.	Date	Away captain	Home captain	Venue	Result
ODI series
ODI 2465	15 December	Craig Wright	Habibul Bashar	Chittagong Divisional Stadium, Chittagong	Bangladesh by 6 wickets
ODI 2467	17 December	Craig Wright	Habibul Bashar	Sher-e-Bangla Cricket Stadium, Dhaka	Bangladesh by 146 runs

== January ==
=== Pakistan in South Africa ===
Pakistan play three Tests, one T20I and five One-day Internationals in South Africa.

No.	Date	Home captain	Away captain	Venue	Result
Test series
Test 1828	11–15 January	Graeme Smith	Inzamam-ul-Haq	SuperSport Park, Centurion	South Africa by 7 wickets
Test 1829	19–23 January	Graeme Smith	Inzamam-ul-Haq	St George's Park, Port Elizabeth	Pakistan by 5 wickets
Test 1830	26–30 January	Graeme Smith	Inzamam-ul-Haq	Newlands, Cape Town	South Africa by 5 wickets
Only T20I
T20I 14	2 February	Graeme Smith	Younis Khan	New Wanderers Stadium, Johannesburg	South Africa by 10 wickets
ODI series
ODI 2506	4 February	Graeme Smith	Younis Khan	SuperSport Park, Centurion	South Africa by 164 runs
ODI 2513	7 February	Graeme Smith	Inzamam-ul-Haq	Kingsmead, Durban	Pakistan by 141 runs
ODI 2517	9 February	Graeme Smith	Inzamam-ul-Haq	St George's Park, Port Elizabeth	Match abandoned
ODI 2521	11 February	Graeme Smith	Inzamam-ul-Haq	Newlands, Cape Town	South Africa by 10 wickets
ODI 2523	14 February	Graeme Smith	Inzamam-ul-Haq	New Wanderers Stadium, Johannesburg	South Africa by 9 wickets

=== Commonwealth Bank Series ===
The Commonwealth Bank Series follows the same format as last year, with 12 group stage matches (8 for each team) and a best-of-three final series. VB is a co-branded sponsor of this series.

Commonwealth Bank Series after 12 matches
Pos	Team	Pld	W	L	T	NR	BP	Pts	NRR
1	Australia	8	7	1	0	0	3	31	0.667
2	England	8	3	5	0	0	1	13	−0.608
3	New Zealand	8	2	6	0	0	1	9	−0.007

Source: Points table from Cricinfo, retrieved 6 February 2007

Group stage
No.	Date	Team 1	Captain	Team 2	Captain	Venue	Result
ODI 2473	12 January	Australia	Ricky Ponting	England	Michael Vaughan	Melbourne Cricket Ground, Melbourne	Australia by 8 wickets
ODI 2474	14 January	Australia	Ricky Ponting	New Zealand	Stephen Fleming	Bellerive Oval, Hobart	Australia by 105 runs
ODI 2475	16 January	England	Michael Vaughan	New Zealand	Stephen Fleming	Bellerive Oval, Hobart	England by 3 wickets
ODI 2478	19 January	Australia	Ricky Ponting	England	Andrew Flintoff	The Gabba, Brisbane	Australia by 4 wickets
ODI 2479	21 January	Australia	Ricky Ponting	New Zealand	Stephen Fleming	Sydney Cricket Ground, Sydney	Australia by 2 wickets
ODI 2482	23 January	England	Andrew Flintoff	New Zealand	Stephen Fleming	Adelaide Oval, Adelaide	New Zealand by 90 runs
ODI 2486	26 January	Australia	Ricky Ponting	England	Andrew Flintoff	Adelaide Oval, Adelaide	Australia by 9 wickets
ODI 2488	28 January	Australia	Ricky Ponting	New Zealand	Stephen Fleming	W.A.C.A. Ground, Perth	Australia by 8 runs
ODI 2490	30 January	England	Andrew Flintoff	New Zealand	Stephen Fleming	W.A.C.A. Ground, Perth	New Zealand by 58 runs
ODI 2497	2 February	Australia	Ricky Ponting	England	Andrew Flintoff	Sydney Cricket Ground, Sydney	England by 92 runs
ODI 2501	4 February	Australia	Ricky Ponting	New Zealand	Stephen Fleming	Melbourne Cricket Ground, Melbourne	Australia by 5 wickets
ODI 2510	6 February	England	Michael Vaughan	New Zealand	Stephen Fleming	The Gabba, Brisbane	England by 14 runs
Finals
No.	Date	Team 1	Captain	Team 2	Captain	Venue	Result
ODI 2515	9 February	Australia	Ricky Ponting	England	Andrew Flintoff	Melbourne Cricket Ground, Melbourne	England by 4 wickets
ODI 2519	11 February	Australia	Ricky Ponting	England	Andrew Flintoff	Sydney Cricket Ground, Sydney	England by 34 runs (D/L)

=== Associates Kenya Tri-Series ===
Kenya hosted Canada and Scotland for a triangular series at Mombasa Sports Club between 17 and 24 January.

Team	Pld	W	L	NR	Pts	NRR
Kenya	4	3	1	0	13	+0.847
Scotland	4	2	2	0	8	−0.906
Canada	4	1	3	0	5	+0.364

Group stage
No.	Date	Team 1	Captain	Team 2	Captain	Venue	Result
ODI 2476	17 January	Kenya	Steve Tikolo	Scotland	Craig White	Mombasa Sports Club, Mombasa	Kenya by 190 runs
ODI 2477	18 January	Canada	John Davison	Scotland	Craig White	Mombasa Sports Club, Mombasa	Scotland by 2 wickets
ODI 2478a	20 January	Kenya	Steve Tikolo	Canada	John Davison	Mombasa Sports Club, Mombasa	Kenya by forfeit
ODI 2481	21 January	Kenya	Steve Tikolo	Scotland	Ryan Watson	Mombasa Sports Club, Mombasa	Kenya by 6 runs
ODI 2483	23 January	Canada	John Davison	Scotland	Craig White	Mombasa Sports Club, Mombasa	Scotland by 2 wickets
ODI 2484	24 January	Kenya	Steve Tikolo	Canada	John Davison	Mombasa Sports Club, Mombasa	Canada by 69 runs

=== West Indies in India ===
No.	Date	Home captain	Away captain	Venue	Result
ODI 2480	21 January	Rahul Dravid	Brian Lara	VCA Ground, Nagpur	India by 14 runs
ODI 2485	24 January	Rahul Dravid	Chris Gayle	Barabati Stadium, Cuttack	India by 20 runs
ODI 2487	27 January	Rahul Dravid	Brian Lara	M. A. Chidambaram Stadium, Chennai	West Indies by 3 wickets
ODI 2493	31 January	Rahul Dravid	Brian Lara	IPCL Ground, Vadodara	India by 160 runs

=== World Cricket League Division One ===
The first edition of the top tier of the World Cricket League tournament took place in Nairobi, Kenya, from 29 January to 7 February. The six non-Test teams who have qualified for the 2007 Cricket World Cup took part in the round-robin tournament, with the top two teams qualifying for the final, and also qualifying for the 2007 Twenty20 World Championship.

Pos	Team	Pld	W	L	Pts	NRR
1	Kenya	5	4	1	8	1.355
2	Scotland	5	4	1	8	0.354
3	Netherlands	5	3	2	6	0.120
4	Canada	5	2	3	4	−0.849
5	Ireland	5	1	4	2	−0.061
6	Bermuda	5	1	4	2	−1.310

Source: ESPNcricinfo

League Stage
No.	Date	Team 1	Captain	Team 2	Captain	Venue	Result
ODI 2489	29 January	Bermuda	Irvine Romaine	Kenya	Steve Tikolo	Jaffery Sports Club Ground, Nairobi	Kenya by 10 wickets
ODI 2491	30 January	Canada	John Davison	Netherlands	Luuk van Troost	Ruaraka Sports Club Ground, Nairobi	Netherlands by 8 wickets
ODI 2492	30 January	Ireland	Trent Johnston	Scotland	Craig Wright	Nairobi Gymkhana Club, Nairobi	Scotland by 3 wickets
ODI 2494	31 January	Bermuda	Irvine Romaine	Ireland	Trent Johnston	Jaffery Sports Club Ground, Nairobi	Ireland by 4 wickets
ODI 2495	31 January	Canada	John Davison	Scotland	Craig Wright	Ruaraka Sports Club Ground, Nairobi	Scotland by 7 runs
ODI 2496	31 January	Kenya	Steve Tikolo	Netherlands	Luuk van Troost	Nairobi Gymkhana Club, Nairobi	Kenya by 7 wickets
ODI 2498	2 February	Canada	John Davison	Bermuda	Irvine Romaine	Nairobi Gymkhana Club, Nairobi	Canada by 56 runs
ODI 2499	2 February	Kenya	Steve Tikolo	Ireland	Trent Johnston	Ruaraka Sports Club Ground, Nairobi	Kenya by 1 wicket
ODI 2500	2 February	Scotland	Craig Wright	Netherlands	Luuk van Troost	Jaffery Sports Club Ground, Nairobi	Scotland by 2 runs
ODI 2502	4 February	Bermuda	Irvine Romaine	Netherlands	Luuk van Troost	Ruaraka Sports Club Ground, Nairobi	Netherlands by 8 wickets
ODI 2503	4 February	Canada	John Davison	Ireland	Trent Johnston	Jaffery Sports Club Ground, Nairobi	Canada by 6 wickets
ODI 2504	4 February	Kenya	Steve Tikolo	Scotland	Craig Wright	Nairobi Gymkhana Club, Nairobi	Scotland by 77 runs
ODI 2507	5 February	Bermuda	Irvine Romaine	Scotland	Craig Wright	Ruaraka Sports Club Ground, Nairobi	Bermuda by 5 wickets
ODI 2508	5 February	Canada	John Davison	Kenya	Steve Tikolo	Jaffery Sports Club Ground, Nairobi	Kenya by 158 runs
ODI 2509	5 February	Ireland	Trent Johnston	Netherlands	Luuk van Troost	Nairobi Gymkhana Club, Nairobi	Netherlands by 6 runs
Final
No.	Date	Team 1	Captain	Team 2	Captain	Venue	Result
ODI 2512	7 February	Scotland	Craig Wright	Kenya	Steve Tikolo	Nairobi Gymkhana Club, Nairobi	Kenya by 8 wickets

== February ==
=== Bangladesh in Zimbabwe ===
Bangladesh played a 4-match ODI series in Zimbabwe from 4 to 10 February.

No.	Date	Home captain	Away captain	Venue	Result
ODI 2505	4 February	Prosper Utseya	Habibul Bashar	Harare Sports Club, Harare	Bangladesh by 45 runs
ODI 2511	6 February	Prosper Utseya	Habibul Bashar	Harare Sports Club, Harare	Zimbabwe by 8 wickets
ODI 2516	9 February	Prosper Utseya	Habibul Bashar	Harare Sports Club, Harare	Bangladesh by 14 runs
ODI 2518	10 February	Prosper Utseya	Habibul Bashar	Harare Sports Club, Harare	Bangladesh by 1 wicket

=== Sri Lanka in India ===
Sri Lanka played a 4-match ODI series in India from 8 to 17 February.

No.	Date	Home captain	Away captain	Venue	Result
ODI 2514	8 February	Rahul Dravid	Mahela Jayawardene	Eden Gardens, Kolkata	No result
ODI 2520	11 February	Rahul Dravid	Mahela Jayawardene	Madhavrao Scindia Cricket Ground, Rajkot	Sri Lanka by 5 runs
ODI 2522	14 February	Rahul Dravid	Mahela Jayawardene	Nehru Stadium, Margao	India by 5 wickets
ODI 2525	17 February	Rahul Dravid	Mahela Jayawardene	ACA-VDCA Stadium, Visakhapatnam	India by 7 wickets

=== Chappell–Hadlee Trophy ===
The third edition of the Chappell–Hadlee Trophy, the annual One-day International series between Australia and New Zealand, was held in New Zealand from 16 to 20 February.

No.	Date	Home captain	Away captain	Venue	Result
ODI 2524	16 February	Stephen Fleming	Michael Hussey	Westpac Stadium, Wellington	New Zealand by 10 wickets
ODI 2526	18 February	Stephen Fleming	Michael Hussey	Eden Park, Auckland	New Zealand by 5 wickets
ODI 2527	20 February	Stephen Fleming	Michael Hussey	Seddon Park, Hamilton	New Zealand by 1 wickets

=== Antigua Tri-Series ===
Bangladesh, Bermuda and Canada took part in a triangular series two weeks before the World Cup. All matches were played at the Antigua Recreation Ground.

Team	Pld	W	L	NR	Pts	NRR
Bangladesh	2	2	0	0	9	+0.831
Canada	2	1	1	0	4	+0.181
Bermuda	2	0	2	0	0	−0.957

Triangular Series
No.	Date	Team 1	Captain	Team 2	Captain	Venue	Result
ODI 2528	25 February	Bangladesh	Habibul Bashar	Bermuda	Irvine Romaine	Antigua Recreation Ground, St. John's, Antigua	Bangladesh by 8 wickets
ODI 2529	26 February	Bermuda	Irvine Romaine	Canada	John Davison	Antigua Recreation Ground, St. John's, Antigua	Canada by 3 wickets
ODI 2530	28 February	Bangladesh	Habibul Bashar	Canada	John Davison	Antigua Recreation Ground, St. John's, Antigua	Bangladesh by 13 runs

== March ==
=== World Cup ===
==== Group stage ====
The 2007 World Cup, the ninth of its kind, begins on 13 March and continues until 28 April. 16 teams will take part, as six non-Test nations join the fray. The teams will play in four groups of four, where the top two teams qualify for the Super Eight stage, played as a round-robin. The top four teams then make it through to the semi-finals.

Pos	Team	Pld	W	L	T	NR	Pts	NRR
1	Australia	3	3	0	0	0	6	3.433
2	South Africa	3	2	1	0	0	4	2.403
3	Netherlands	3	1	2	0	0	2	−2.527
4	Scotland	3	0	3	0	0	0	−3.793

Source: ESPNcricinfo

Pos	Team	Pld	W	L	T	NR	Pts	NRR
1	Sri Lanka	3	3	0	0	0	6	3.493
2	Bangladesh	3	2	1	0	0	4	−1.523
3	India	3	1	2	0	0	2	1.206
4	Bermuda	3	0	3	0	0	0	−4.345

Source: ESPNcricinfo

Pos	Team	Pld	W	L	T	NR	Pts	NRR
1	New Zealand	3	3	0	0	0	6	2.138
2	England	3	2	1	0	0	4	0.418
3	Kenya	3	1	2	0	0	2	−1.194
4	Canada	3	0	3	0	0	0	−1.389

Source: ESPNcricinfo

Pos	Team	Pld	W	L	T	NR	Pts	NRR
1	West Indies	3	3	0	0	0	6	0.764
2	Ireland	3	1	1	1	0	3	−0.092
3	Pakistan	3	1	2	0	0	2	0.089
4	Zimbabwe	3	0	2	1	0	1	−0.886

Source: ESPNcricinfo

No.	Group	Date	Team 1	Captain	Team 2	Captain	Venue	Result
Group stage
ODI 2531	D	13 March	West Indies	Brian Lara	Pakistan	Inzamam-ul-Haq	Sabina Park, Kingston, Jamaica	West Indies by 54 runs
ODI 2532	A	14 March	Australia	Ricky Ponting	Scotland	Craig Wright	Warner Park, Basseterre, St. Kitts	Australia by 203 runs
ODI 2533	C	14 March	Canada	John Davison	Kenya	Steve Tikolo	Beausejour Stadium, Gros Islet, St Lucia	Kenya by 7 wickets
ODI 2534	B	15 March	Bermuda	Irvine Romaine	Sri Lanka	Mahela Jayawardene	Queen's Park Oval, Port of Spain, Trinidad	Sri Lanka by 243 runs
ODI 2535	D	15 March	Ireland	Trent Johnston	Zimbabwe	Prosper Utseya	Sabina Park, Kingston, Jamaica	Match tied
ODI 2536	A	16 March	Netherlands	Luuk van Troost	South Africa	Graeme Smith	Warner Park, Basseterre, St. Kitts	South Africa by 221 runs
ODI 2537	C	16 March	England	Michael Vaughan	New Zealand	Stephen Fleming	Beausejour Stadium, Gros Islet, St Lucia	New Zealand by 6 wickets
ODI 2538	B	17 March	Bangladesh	Habibul Bashar	India	Rahul Dravid	Queen's Park Oval, Port of Spain, Trinidad	Bangladesh by 5 wickets
ODI 2539	D	17 March	Ireland	Trent Johnston	Pakistan	Inzamam-ul-Haq	Sabina Park, Kingston, Jamaica	Ireland by 3 wickets
ODI 2540	A	18 March	Australia	Ricky Ponting	Netherlands	Luuk van Troost	Warner Park, Basseterre, St. Kitts	Australia by 229 runs
ODI 2541	C	18 March	Canada	John Davison	England	Michael Vaughan	Beausejour Stadium, Gros Islet, St Lucia	England by 51 runs
ODI 2542	B	19 March	Bermuda	Irvine Romaine	India	Rahul Dravid	Queen's Park Oval, Port of Spain, Trinidad	India by 257 runs
ODI 2543	D	19 March	West Indies	Brian Lara	Zimbabwe	Prosper Utseya	Sabina Park, Kingston, Jamaica	West Indies by 6 wickets
ODI 2544	A	20 March	Scotland	Ryan Watson	South Africa	Graeme Smith	Warner Park, Basseterre, St. Kitts	South Africa by 7 wickets
ODI 2545	C	20 March	Kenya	Steve Tikolo	New Zealand	Stephen Fleming	Beausejour Stadium, Gros Islet, St Lucia	New Zealand by 148 runs
ODI 2546	B	21 March	Bangladesh	Habibul Bashar	Sri Lanka	Mahela Jayawardene	Queen's Park Oval, Port of Spain, Trinidad	Sri Lanka by 198 runs (D/L)
ODI 2547	D	21 March	Pakistan	Inzamam-ul-Haq	Zimbabwe	Prosper Utseya	Sabina Park, Kingston, Jamaica	Pakistan by 93 runs (D/L)
ODI 2548	A	22 March	Netherlands	Jeroen Smits	Scotland	Craig Wright	Warner Park, Basseterre, St. Kitts	Netherlands by 8 wickets
ODI 2549	C	22 March	Canada	John Davison	New Zealand	Stephen Fleming	Beausejour Stadium, Gros Islet, St Lucia	New Zealand by 114 runs
ODI 2550	B	23 March	India	Rahul Dravid	Sri Lanka	Mahela Jayawardene	Queen's Park Oval, Port of Spain, Trinidad	Sri Lanka by 69 runs
ODI 2551	D	23 March	Ireland	Kyle McCallan	West Indies	Brian Lara	Sabina Park, Kingston, Jamaica	West Indies by 8 wickets
ODI 2552	A	24 March	Australia	Ricky Ponting	South Africa	Graeme Smith	Warner Park, Basseterre, St. Kitts	Australia by 83 runs
ODI 2553	C	24 March	England	Michael Vaughan	Kenya	Steve Tikolo	Beausejour Stadium, Gros Islet, St Lucia	England by 7 wickets
ODI 2554	B	25 March	Bangladesh	Habibul Bashar	Bermuda	Irvine Romaine	Queen's Park Oval, Port of Spain, Trinidad	Bangladesh by 7 wickets

==== Super Eights ====
Pos	Team	Pld	W	L	T	NR	Pts	NRR
1	Australia	7	7	0	0	0	14	2.400
2	Sri Lanka	7	5	2	0	0	10	1.483
3	New Zealand	7	5	2	0	0	10	0.253
4	South Africa	7	4	3	0	0	8	0.313
5	England	7	3	4	0	0	6	−0.394
6	West Indies	7	2	5	0	0	4	−0.566
7	Bangladesh	7	1	6	0	0	2	−1.514
8	Ireland	7	1	6	0	0	2	−1.730

No.	Date	Team 1	Captain	Team 2	Captain	Venue	Result
Super Eights
ODI 2555	27–28 March	West Indies	Brian Lara	Australia	Ricky Ponting	Sir Vivian Richards Stadium, North Sound, Antigua	Australia by 103 runs
ODI 2556	28 March	South Africa	Graeme Smith	Sri Lanka	Mahela Jayawardene	Providence Stadium, Providence, Guyana	South Africa by 1 wicket
ODI 2557	29 March	West Indies	Brian Lara	New Zealand	Stephen Fleming	Sir Vivian Richards Stadium, North Sound, Antigua	New Zealand by 7 wickets
ODI 2558	30 March	Ireland	Trent Johnston	England	Michael Vaughan	Providence Stadium, Providence, Guyana	England by 48 runs
ODI 2559	31 March	Australia	Ricky Ponting	Bangladesh	Habibul Bashar	Sir Vivian Richards Stadium, North Sound, Antigua	Australia by 10 wickets
ODI 2560	1 April	West Indies	Brian Lara	Sri Lanka	Mahela Jayawardene	Providence Stadium, Providence, Guyana	Sri Lanka by 113 runs
ODI 2561	2 April	Ireland	Habibul Bashar	New Zealand	Stephen Fleming	Sir Vivian Richards Stadium, North Sound, Antigua	New Zealand by 9 wickets
ODI 2562	3 April	Ireland	Trent Johnston	South Africa	Graeme Smith	Providence Stadium, Providence, Guyana	South Africa by 7 wickets
ODI 2563	4 April	England	Michael Vaughan	Sri Lanka	Mahela Jayawardene	Sir Vivian Richards Stadium, North Sound, Antigua	Sri Lanka by 2 runs
ODI 2564	7 April	Bangladesh	Habibul Bashar	South Africa	Graeme Smith	Providence Stadium, Providence, Guyana	Bangladesh by 67 runs
ODI 2565	8 April	Australia	Ricky Ponting	England	Michael Vaughan	Sir Vivian Richards Stadium, North Sound, Antigua	Australia by 7 wickets
ODI 2566	9 April	Ireland	Trent Johnston	New Zealand	Stephen Fleming	Providence Stadium, Providence, Guyana	New Zealand by 129 runs
ODI 2567	10 April	West Indies	Brian Lara	South Africa	Graeme Smith	Queens's Park, St. George's, Grenada	South Africa by 67 runs
ODI 2568	11 April	England	Michael Vaughan	Bangladesh	Habibul Bashar	Kensington Oval, Bridgetown, Barbados	England by 4 wickets
ODI 2569	12 April	Sri Lanka	Mahela Jayawardene	New Zealand	Stephen Fleming	Queens's Park, St. George's, Grenada	Sri Lanka by 6 wickets
ODI 2570	13 April	Australia	Ricky Ponting	Ireland	Trent Johnston	Kensington Oval, Bridgetown, Barbados	Australia by 9 wickets
ODI 2571	14 April	South Africa	Graeme Smith	New Zealand	Stephen Fleming	Queens's Park, St. George's, Grenada	New Zealand by 5 wickets
ODI 2572	15 April	Bangladesh	Habibul Bashar	Ireland	Trent Johnston	Kensington Oval, Bridgetown, Barbados	Ireland by 74 runs
ODI 2573	16 April	Australia	Ricky Ponting	Sri Lanka	Mahela Jayawardene	Queens's Park, St. George's, Grenada	Australia by 7 wickets
ODI 2574	17 April	South Africa	Graeme Smith	England	Michael Vaughan	Kensington Oval, Bridgetown, Barbados	South Africa by 9 wickets
ODI 2575	18 April	Ireland	Trent Johnston	Sri Lanka	Mahela Jayawardene	Queens's Park, St. George's, Grenada	Sri Lanka by 8 wickets
ODI 2576	19 April	West Indies	Brian Lara	Bangladesh	Habibul Bashar	Kensington Oval, Bridgetown, Barbados	West Indies by 99 runs
ODI 2577	20 April	Australia	Ricky Ponting	New Zealand	Stephen Fleming	Queens's Park, St. George's, Grenada	Australia by 215 runs
ODI 2578	21 April	West Indies	Brian Lara	England	Michael Vaughan	Kensington Oval, Bridgetown, Barbados	England by 1 wickets

==== Knockout stage ====
No.	Date	Team 1	Captain	Team 2	Captain	Venue	Result
Semi–finals
ODI 2579	24 April	Sri Lanka	Mahela Jayawardene	New Zealand	Stephen Fleming	Sabina Park, Kingston, Jamaica	Sri Lanka by 81 runs
ODI 2580	25 April	Australia	Ricky Ponting	South Africa	Graeme Smith	Beausejour Stadium, Gros Islet, St Lucia	Australia by 7 wickets
Final
ODI 2581	28 April	Sri Lanka	Mahela Jayawardene	Australia	Ricky Ponting	Kensington Oval, Bridgetown, Barbados	Australia by 53 runs (D/L)

== Further references ==
- The Cricinfo Archives – 2006/07
- ICC Future Tours Program 2006–07, from ICC. Retrieved 19 August 2006
