= International cricket in 2006 =

Matches scheduled between May and August 2006 in all cricketing countries

International cricket played in the 2006 cricket season is defined as matches scheduled between May and August 2006 in all cricketing countries, as well as all international matches scheduled for the 2006 English cricket season. Matches between January and April are defined as belonging to the 2005–06 season, while matches between September and December are defined as the 2006–07 season. The main matches in this period were played in England, as this was in the middle of the English cricket season, but the third edition of the ICC Intercontinental Cup is defined as a part of the 2006 season, even though the tournament stretched into February 2007, and three A teams were also scheduled to tour the northwestern part of Australia in June and July 2006.

== Season overview ==
International tours
Start date	Home team	Away team	Results [Matches]		
Start date	Home team	Away team	Test	ODI	T20I
29 April 2006	West Indies	Zimbabwe	—	5–0 [7]	—
11 May 2006	England	Sri Lanka	1–1 [3]	0–5 [5]	0–1[1]
18 May 2006	West Indies	India	0–1 [4]	4–1 [5]	—
13 June 2006	Ireland	England	—	0–1 [1]	—
27 June 2006	Scotland	Pakistan	—	0–1 [1]	—
4 July 2006	Netherlands	Sri Lanka	—	0–2 [2]	—
13 July 2006	England	Pakistan	3–0 [4]	2–2 [5]	0–1 [1]
27 July 2006	Sri Lanka	South Africa	2–0[2]	—	—
29 July 2006	Zimbabwe	Bangladesh	—	3–2 [5]	—
12 August 2006	Kenya	Bangladesh	—	0–3 [3]	—
18 August 2006	Sri Lanka	India	—	0–0 [3]	—
Minor tours
Start date	Home team	Away team	Results [Matches]		
Start date	Home team	Away team	First-class		ODI
5 August 2006	Canada	Kenya	—		0–2 [2]
19 August 2006	Canada	Bermuda	—		0–2 [2]
Minor tournaments
Dates	Tournament			Winners	
16 May 2006	(Cricket West Indies) Triangular Series			Zimbabwe	
27 June 2006	(Australia) EAP Cricket Trophy			Fiji	
4 August 2006	(Scotland) European Championship			Ireland	
21 August 2006	(Canada) Americas Championship			Bermuda	
23 August 2006	(Tanzania) African Championship			Tanzania	

== ICC Championship Tables in May 2006 ==
ICC Test Championship Table at 7 May
Pos	Nation	Points
1	Australia	131
2	England	113
3	India	111
4	Pakistan	109
5	South Africa	101
6	New Zealand	97
7	Sri Lanka	95
8	West Indies	72
9	Zimbabwe	27
10	Bangladesh	3

ICC ODI Championship Table at 28 April
Pos	Nation	Points
1	Australia	132
2	South Africa	119
3	India	116
4	Pakistan	114
5	New Zealand	113
6	Sri Lanka	105
7	England	103
8	West Indies	89
9	Zimbabwe	42
10	Bangladesh	23
11	Kenya	7

== April 2006 ==
=== EurAsia Cricket Series ===
This was a series held at the Sheikh Zayed Cricket Stadium in Abu Dhabi, between three A teams (second-choice teams) from Test-playing nations, two A teams from One Day International-playing nations, and the hosting nation UAE. India A and Pakistan A played in the final, while Netherlands A and Ireland A went home without any wins. UAE finished second in their group, after winning two games, while Sri Lanka A's three wins saw them second behind Pakistan A.

Group A Table
Team	M	W	L	NR	Pts	NRR
India A	2	2	0	0	11	+2.36
Pakistan A	2	1	1	0	7	+0.89
Netherlands A	2	0	2	0	0	–3.25

Group B Table
Team	M	W	L	NR	Pts	NRR
Sri Lanka A	2	2	0	0	11	+0.89
United Arab Emirates	2	1	1	0	7	+1.16
Ireland A	2	0	2	0	0	–2.06

The top team from Group A and the second and third placed in Group B were placed in Group C; the others in Group D. Results from the first group stage were carried forward.

Group C Table
Team	M	W	L	NR	Pts	NRR
India A	4	4	0	0	23	+2.24
United Arab Emirates	4	2	2	0	12	–0.05
Ireland A	4	0	4	0	1	–1.56

Group B Table
Team	M	W	L	NR	Pts	NRR
Pakistan A	4	3	1	0	18	+1.03
Sri Lanka A	4	3	1	0	18	+1.13
Netherlands A	4	0	4	0	0	–2.94

No.	Group	Date	Team 1	Captain	Team 2	Captain	Result
First Group Stage
Match 1	B	22 April	UAE	Arshad Ali	IRL A	William Porterfield	UAE by 8 wkts
Match 2	A	23 April	IND A	Venugopal Rao	NED A	Jeroen Smits	IND A by 202 runs
Match 3	B	24 April	IRL A	William Porterfield	SL A	Avishka Gunawardene	SL A by 87 runs
Match 4	A	25 April	PAK A	Hasan Raza	NED A	Jeroen Smits	PAK A by 123 runs
Match 5	B	27 April	UAE	Arshad Ali	SL A	Avishka Gunawardene	SL A by 2 wkts
Match 6	A	28 April	IND A	Venugopal Rao	PAK A	Hasan Raza	IND A by 34 runs
Second Group Stage
Match 7	D	29 April	NED A	Jeroen Smits	SL A	Avishka Gunawardene	SL A by 157 runs
Match 8	C	30 April	IND A	Venugopal Rao	UAE	Arshad Ali	IND A by 126 runs
Match 9	D	1 May	NED A	Jeroen Smits	PAK A	Hasan Raza	PAK A by 6 wkts
Match 10	C	2 May	IND A	Venugopal Rao	IRL A	William Porterfield	IND A by 8 wkts
Match 11	D	3 May	PAK A	Hasan Raza	SL A	Avishka Gunawardene	PAK A by 8 wkts
Match 12	C	4 May	UAE	Arshad Ali	IRL A	William Porterfield	UAE by 31 runs
Final
Final	5 May		IND A	Venugopal Rao	PAK A	Hasan Raza	PAK A by 36 runs

=== Zimbabwe in West Indies ===
A Test match series was originally planned, but Zimbabwe withdrew temporarily from Test cricket before this tour, and it was instead agreed to arrange seven One Day Internationals instead of five

Zimbabweans in West Indies in 2006. One-Day International series result: West Indies won 5–0.

No.	Date	Home captain	Away captain	Venue	Result
One-day International Series
ODI 2368	29 April	Brian Lara	Terry Duffin	Antigua Recreation Ground, St John's, Antigua	West Indies by 5 wkts
ODI 2369	30 April	Brian Lara	Terry Duffin	Antigua Recreation Ground, St John's, Antigua	West Indies by 98 runs
ODI 2369a	6 May	Brian Lara	Terry Duffin	Bourda, Georgetown, Guyana	No result
ODI 2370	7 May	Brian Lara	Terry Duffin	Bourda, Georgetown, Guyana	West Indies by 82 runs
ODI 2371	10 May	Brian Lara	Terry Duffin	Beausejour Stadium, Gros Islet, St. Lucia	West Indies by 10 wkts
ODI 2372	13 May	Brian Lara	Terry Duffin	Queen's Park Oval, Port of Spain, Trinidad	No result
ODI 2373	14 May	Brian Lara	Terry Duffin	Queen's Park Oval, Port of Spain, Trinidad	West Indies by 104 runs

== May 2006 ==
=== Sri Lanka in England ===
England return home on the back of a disastrous Winter tour of the sub-continent, having not won any of the series before or after Christmas; while Sri Lanka look to compound their win against Bangladesh.

Sri Lankans in England 2006: Test Series drawn 1-1. Sri Lanka win Twenty20 International. Sri Lanka win ODI series 5–0.

No.	Date	Home captain	Away captain	Venue	Result
Test Match Schedule
Test 1802	11–15 May	Andrew Flintoff	Mahela Jayawardene	Lord's, London	Match Drawn
Test 1803	25–29 May	Andrew Flintoff	Mahela Jayawardene	Edgbaston, Birmingham	England by 6 wkts
Test 1805	2–6 June	Andrew Flintoff	Mahela Jayawardene	Trent Bridge, Nottingham	Sri Lanka by 134 runs
Twenty20 International Schedule
T20I 7	15 June	Andrew Strauss	Mahela Jayawardene	Rose Bowl, Southampton	Sri Lanka by 2 runs
One-Day International Schedule
ODI 2384	17 June	Andrew Strauss	Mahela Jayawardene	Lord's, London	Sri Lanka by 20 runs
ODI 2385	20 June	Andrew Strauss	Mahela Jayawardene	The Oval, London	Sri Lanka by 46 runs
ODI 2386	24 June	Andrew Strauss	Mahela Jayawardene	Riverside Ground, Chester-le-Street	Sri Lanka by 8 wkts
ODI 2388	28 June	Andrew Strauss	Mahela Jayawardene	Old Trafford, Manchester	Sri Lanka by 33 runs
ODI 2389	1 July	Andrew Strauss	Mahela Jayawardene	Headingley, Leeds	Sri Lanka by 8 wkts

=== Triangular Series (Bermuda, Canada, Zimbabwe) ===
This tournament was held in Trinidad immediately follow the ODI series between Zimbabwe and West Indies. Zimbabwe won the tournament after going through unbeaten, while Bermuda finished second after winning their inaugural ODI - before losing twice to Zimbabwe.

Team	M	W	L	NR	Pts	NRR
Zimbabwe	2	2	0	0	10	+3.37
Bermuda	2	1	1	0	4	–1.97
Canada	2	0	2	0	0	–1.63

No.	Date	Team 1	Captain	Team 2	Captain	Venue	Result
Group Stages
ODI 2374	16 May	Canada	John Davison	Zimbabwe	Terry Duffin	Queen's Park Oval, Port of Spain, Trinidad	Zimbabwe by 143 runs
ODI 2375	17 May	Bermuda	Janeiro Tucker	Canada	John Davison	Queen's Park Oval, Port of Spain, Trinidad	Bermuda by 3 wkts
ODI 2376	18 May	Bermuda	Janeiro Tucker	Zimbabwe	Terry Duffin	Queen's Park Oval, Port of Spain, Trinidad	Zimbabwe by 194 runs
Final
ODI 2378	20 May	Bermuda	Janeiro Tucker	Zimbabwe	Terry Duffin	Queen's Park Oval, Port of Spain, Trinidad	Zimbabwe by 83 runs

=== India in West Indies ===
No.	Date	Home captain	Away captain	Venue	Result
One-Day International Schedule
ODI 2377	18 May	Brian Lara	Rahul Dravid	Sabina Park, Kingston, Jamaica	India by 5 wkts
ODI 2379	20 May	Brian Lara	Rahul Dravid	Sabina Park, Kingston, Jamaica	West Indies by 1 run
ODI 2380	23 May	Brian Lara	Rahul Dravid	Warner Park, Basseterre, St. Kitts	West Indies by 4 wkts
ODI 2381	26 May	Brian Lara	Rahul Dravid	Queen's Park Oval, Port of Spain, Trinidad	West Indies by 6 wkts
ODI 2382	28 May	Brian Lara	Rahul Dravid	Queen's Park Oval, Port of Spain, Trinidad	West Indies by 19 runs
Test Match Schedule
Test 1804	2–6 June	Brian Lara	Rahul Dravid	Antigua Recreation Ground, St John's, Antigua	Match Drawn
Test 1806	10–14 June	Brian Lara	Rahul Dravid	Beausejour Stadium, Gros Islet, St.Lucia	Match Drawn
Test 1807	22–26 June	Brian Lara	Rahul Dravid	Warner Park, Basseterre, St. Kitts	Match Drawn
Test 1808	30 June-4 July	Brian Lara	Rahul Dravid	Sabina Park, Kingston, Jamaica	India by 49 runs

== June 2006 ==
=== England in Ireland ===
Ireland lost their debut One Day International, but England's win described by Cricinfo as "unspectacular", with Marcus Trescothick making 113 after England chose to bat first. Irish native Ed Joyce opened the innings for England, scoring 10 before he was caught by Kevin O'Brien, but a 142-run partnership between Trescothick and Ian Bell for the fourth wicket brought 200 up for England. England scored 84 off the last ten overs, with Bell making an ODI career high of 80. Ireland did bat out 50 overs, but no one could match the scores of Trescothick and Bell; Andre Botha made the best attempt, but his 52 lasted 89 balls, well below the required run rate of six an over. Steve Harmison took three wickets, but conceded 58 runs after bowling an opening spell described by The Times as "a curate's egg". Ireland's highest-scoring partnership was for the seventh wicket, with Andrew White adding 64 with O'Brien.

No.	Date	Home captain	Away captain	Venue	Result
One-Day International Schedule
ODI 2383	13 June	Trent Johnston	Andrew Strauss	Stormont, Belfast	England by 38 runs

=== Bangladesh A in Zimbabwe ===
Bangladesh A toured Zimbabwe for three first class and five one-day matches against the A team of the hosting nation. The first-class series ended in a draw after Bangladesh A fell to defeat in the third match after giving Zimbabwe A the first-innings lead of 203 to eventually lose the match by seven wickets. However, Bangladesh A secured the one-day series by winning the first three games.

Zimbabwe A v Bangladesh A. First-class series: Drawn 1–1. One-day series: Bangladesh A won 4–1.

No.	Date	Home captain	Away captain	Venue	Result
First Class Schedule
FC 1	17–20 June	Hamilton Masakadza	Tushar Imran	Mutare Sports Club, Mutare	BAN A by 7 wkts
FC 2	23–26 June	Hamilton Masakadza	Tushar Imran	Mutare Sports Club, Mutare	Match drawn
FC 3	30 June-3 July	Stuart Matsikenyeri	Tushar Imran	Queens Sports Club, Bulawayo	ZIM A by 7 wkts
One-Day Schedule
OD 1	6 July	Hamilton Masakadza	Tushar Imran	Queens Sports Club, Bulawayo	BAN A by 26 runs
OD 2	8 July	Stuart Matsikenyeri	Tushar Imran	Queens Sports Club, Bulawayo	BAN A by 4 wkts
OD 3	9 July	Stuart Matsikenyeri	Tushar Imran	Queens Sports Club, Bulawayo	BAN A by 6 wkts
OD 4	12 July	Stuart Matsikenyeri	Tushar Imran	Kwekwe Sports Club, Kwekwe	ZIM A by 6 wkts
OD 5	14 July	Hamilton Masakadza	Tushar Imran	Kwekwe Sports Club	BAN A by 58 runs

=== Pakistan in Scotland ===
Pakistan won the match by five wickets, after Scotland lost four wickets in the first eight overs and then four more in the remaining 42. Ryan Watson and Neil McCallum put on 116 for the fifth wicket, an ODI record partnership for Scotland, who played their first ODI for seven years. Their innings also doubled the number of ODI fifties scored for Scotland.

No.	Date	Home captain	Away captain	Venue	Result
One-day International Schedule
ODI 2387	27 June	Ryan Watson	Inzamam-ul-Haq	Grange, Edinburgh	Pakistan by 5 wkts

=== EAP Cricket Trophy ===
This tournament determined one qualifier from the East-Asia Pacific region to Division Three of the 2007 World Cricket League. Three teams, Cook Islands (qualified from the 2005 ICC EAP Cricket Cup), Fijian and Japan (qualified from the 2005 ICC EAP Cricket Cup) played in the tournament, which was held in Brisbane using a double round robin format. Fiji went through the tournament unbeaten.

EAP Cricket Trophy. Teams: Cook Islands, Fiji, Japan. Winners: Fiji

Final Table
Team	M	W	L	NR	Pts
Fiji	4	4	0	0	8
Cook Islands	4	1	3	0	2
Japan	4	1	3	0	2

No.	Date	Team 1	Captain	Team 2	Captain	Venue	Result
EAP Cricket Trophy
Match 1	27 June	Fiji	Joeli Mateyawa	Japan	Tetsuo Fuji	Peter Burge Oval	Fiji by 8 wits
Match 2	28 June	Fiji	Joeli Mateyawa	Cook Islands	William Browne	Peter Burge Oval	Fiji by 5 wkts
Match 3	29 June	Japan	Tetsuo Fuji	Cook Islands	Dunu Eliaba	Peter Burge Oval	Japan by 2 wkts (D/L)
Match 4	30 June	Fiji	Joeli Mateyawa	Japan	Tetsuo Fuji	Peter Burge Oval	Fiji by 82 runs
Match 5	1 July	Fiji	Joeli Mateyawa	Cook Islands	Dunu Eliaba	Peter Burge Oval	Fiji by 1 wkt
Match 6	2 July	Japan	Tetsuo Fuji	Cook Islands	Dunu Eliaba	Peter Burge Oval	Cook Islands by 26 runs

== July 2006 ==
=== Sri Lanka in the Netherlands ===
Sri Lanka batted first in both matches, and won both. In the first match, they surpassed the world record ODI total set by South Africa four months earlier, making 443 for four on their way to a 195-run victory. Both Sanath Jayasuriya and Tillakaratne Dilshan made centuries. Sri Lanka made two changes for the second match, with Jayasuriya resting, and still won the second match by 55 runs

Sri Lanka in the Netherlands in 2006. One-day International series: Sri Lanka won 2–0.

No.	Date	Home captain	Away captain	Venue	Result
One-Day Internationals Schedule
ODI 2390	4 July	Luuk van Troost	Mahela Jayawardene	VRA Cricket Ground, Amstelveen	Sri Lanka by 195 runs
ODI 2391	6 July	Luuk van Troost	Mahela Jayawardene	VRA Cricket Ground, Amstelveen	Sri Lanka by 55 runs

=== Top End Series ===
The top end refers to the "Top End" of Australia geographically, i.e. the cities of Darwin and Cairns, who are set to host these matches

No.	Date	Team 1	Captain	Team 2	Captain	Venue	Result
Twenty20 Schedule
T20 1	9 July	(Australia) AUS A	Brad Haddin	(New Zealand) NZ A	Craig McMillan	Marrara Oval, Darwin	AUS A by 16 runs
T20 2	9 July	(New Zealand) NZ A	Craig McMillan	(Pakistan) PAK A	Misbah-ul-Haq	Marrara Oval, Darwin	PAK A by 60 runs
T20 3	23 July	(Australia) AUS A	Brad Haddin	(Pakistan) PAK A	Misbah-ul-Haq	Cazaly's Stadium, Cairns	PAK A by 2 wkts
One-Day Schedule
OD 1	5 July	(Australia) AUS A	Brad Haddin	(New Zealand) NZ A	Peter Fulton	Marrara Oval, Darwin	NZ A by 8 wkts
OD 2	6 July	(Pakistan) PAK A	Misbah-ul-Haq	(India) IND A	Venugopal Rao	Marrara Oval, Darwin	IND A by 130 runs
OD 3	8 July	(Australia) AUS A	Brad Haddin	(India) IND A	Venugopal Rao	Marrara Oval, Darwin	IND A by 4 wkts
OD 4	24 July	(India) IND A	Venugopal Rao	(New Zealand) NZ A	Peter Fulton	Cazaly's Stadium, Cairns	NZ A by 7 wkts
OD 5	25 July	(Pakistan) PAK A	Misbah-ul-Haq	(Australia) AUS A	Brad Haddin	Cazaly's Stadium, Cairns	TIE
OD 6	27 July	(Pakistan) PAK A	Misbah-ul-Haq	(New Zealand) NZ A	Peter Fulton	Cazaly's Stadium, Cairns	NZ A by 50 runs
First Class Schedule
FC 1	11–14 July	(India) IND A	Parthiv Patel	(New Zealand) NZ A	Craig McMillan	Gardens Oval, Darwin	IND A by 3 wkts
FC 2	11–14 July	(Pakistan) PAK A	Misbah-ul-Haq	(Australia) AUS A	Brad Haddin	Marrara Oval, Darwin	Match Drawn
FC 3	17–20 July	(Pakistan) PAK A	Misbah-ul-Haq	(New Zealand) NZ A	Craig McMillan	Fretwell Park, Cairns	No result
FC 4	18–21 July	(India) IND A	Venugopal Rao	(Australia) AUS A	Brad Haddin	Cazaly's Stadium, Cairns	Match Drawn

=== Pakistan in England ===
After a draw in the first Test, Andrew Strauss led his team to back-to-back Test victories and secured the series before the fourth and final Test. That Test was marred by a ball-tampering controversy, which culminated in Pakistan refusing to take the field after the tea interval in protest to a decision by umpire Darrell Hair to penalise the Pakistani team for ball-tampering. This led the umpires eventually to award the game to England, who thus won the Test series 3–0.

Pakistani cricket team in England in 2006. Test series result: England won 3–0. Twenty20 International: Pakistan won one-off match. One-day International Series: Drawn 2–2.

No.	Date	Home captain	Away captain	Venue	Result
Test Series Schedule
Test 1809	13–17 July	Andrew Strauss	Inzamam-ul-Haq	Lord's, London	Match Drawn
Test 1811	27–31 July	Andrew Strauss	Inzamam-ul-Haq	Old Trafford, Manchester	England by innings & 120 runs
Test 1813	4–8 August	Andrew Strauss	Inzamam-ul-Haq	Headingley, Leeds	England by 167 runs
Test 1814	17–21 August	Andrew Strauss	Inzamam-ul-Haq	The Oval, London	Match Awarded to England
Twenty20 International Schedule
T20I 8	28 August	Andrew Strauss	Inzamam-ul-Haq	Bristol County Ground, Bristol	Pakistan by 5 wickets
One-Day International Schedule
ODI 2408	30 August	Andrew Strauss	Inzamam-ul-Haq	Sophia Gardens, Cardiff	No result
ODI 2409	2 September	Andrew Strauss	Inzamam-ul-Haq	Lord's, London	Pakistan by 7 wickets (D/L)
ODI 2410	5 September	Andrew Strauss	Inzamam-ul-Haq	Rose Bowl, Southampton	Pakistan by 2 wickets
ODI 2411	8 September	Andrew Strauss	Inzamam-ul-Haq	Trent Bridge, Nottingham	England by 8 wickets
ODI 2412	10 September	Andrew Strauss	Inzamam-ul-Haq	Edgbaston, Birmingham	England by 3 wickets

=== South Africa in Sri Lanka ===
Originally, South Africa was set to play Sri Lanka and India in the tri-nation Unitech Cup one-day cricket tournament. Following a series of bomb blasts in the Sri Lankan capital, South Africa withdrew from the tournament.

No.	Date	Home captain	Away captain	Venue	Result
Test Schedule
Test 1810	27–31 July	Ashwell Prince	Mahela Jayawardene	Sinhalese Sports Club Ground, Colombo	Sri Lanka by inns & 153 runs
Test 1812	4–8 August	Ashwell Prince	Mahela Jayawardene	P. Saravanamuttu Stadium, Colombo	Sri Lanka by 1 wicket

=== Bangladesh in Zimbabwe ===
The tour included only five One Day International, as Zimbabwe have voluntarily withdrawn from Test cricket.

Bangladeshis in Zimbabwe in 2006. ODI series: Zimbabwe won 3–2.

No.	Date	Home captain	Away captain	Venue	Result
One-Day International Schedule
ODI 2392	29 July	Habibul Bashar	Prosper Utseya	Harare Sports Club, Harare	Zimbabwe by 2 wkts
ODI 2393	30 July	Habibul Bashar	Prosper Utseya	Harare Sports Club, Harare	Bangladesh by 62 runs
ODI 2394	2 August	Khaled Mashud	Prosper Utseya	Harare Sports Club, Harare	Zimbabwe by 2 wkts
ODI 2395	4 August	Khaled Mashud	Prosper Utseya	Harare Sports Club, Harare	Zimbabwe by 7 wkts
ODI 2397	6 August	Khaled Mashud	Prosper Utseya	Harare Sports Club, Harare	Bangladesh by 8 wkts

=== Indian Women in Ireland and England ===
Indian Women in Ireland and England. One-day Internationals in Ireland: India won 2–0. One-day Internationals in England: England won 4–0. Test match: India won the one-off Test match.

No.	Date	Home captain	Away captain	Venue	Result
One-day Internationals: Ireland v India
WODI 567	29 July	Heather Whelan	Mithali Raj	Railway Union CC	India by 107 runs
WODI 568	30 July	Heather Whelan	Mithali Raj	The Hills CC, Vineyard	India by 78 runs (D/L)
Women's Twenty20 International Schedule
WT20I 3	5 August	Charlotte Edwards	Mithali Raj	Derby	India by 8 wkts
Women's Test Schedule
WTest 128	8–11 August 2006	Charlotte Edwards	Mithali Raj	Grace Road	Match Drawn
WTest 129	29 August-1 September 2006	Charlotte Edwards	Mithali Raj	Taunton	India by 5 wkts
Women's One-Day International Schedule
WODI 569	14 August	Charlotte Edwards	Mithali Raj	Lord's	England by 100 runs
WODI 570	17 August	Charlotte Edwards	Mithali Raj	Denis Compton Oval	No result
WODI 571	19 August	Charlotte Edwards	Mithali Raj	Arundel Castle	England by 5 wkts
WODI 575	24 August	Charlotte Edwards	Mithali Raj	Rose Bowl	England by 3 wkts
WODI 576	25 August	Charlotte Edwards	Mithali Raj	Rose Bowl	England by 7 wkts

== August 2006 ==
=== European Championship ===
Division One of the 2006 European Cricket Championship consisted of five teams, Denmark, Ireland, Italy, Netherlands and Scotland. The three matches between Ireland, the Netherlands and Scotland were official One-day Internationals, though the match between Netherlands and Ireland was called off. Despite finishing last, Italy qualified for World Cricket League Div III because of other 4 nations already qualified for the league, so Italy claims the place as the best non-qualified nation.

Current Table
Team	M	W	L	NR	Pts	NRR
Ireland	4	3	0	1	7	+2.42
Scotland	4	3	1	0	6	+0.03
Netherlands	4	2	1	1	5	+1.18
Denmark	4	1	3	0	2	-0.28
Italy	4	0	4	0	0	-2.72

No.	Date	Team 1	Captain	Team 2	Captain	Venue	Result
Group Stages
Match 1	4 August	Denmark	Frederik Klokker	Ireland	Trent Johnston	Hamilton Crescent	Ireland by 99 runs
Match 2	4 August	Italy	Alessandro Bonora	Netherlands	Luuk van Troost	Shawholm	Netherlands by 140 runs
ODI 2396	5 August	Scotland	Craig Wright	Ireland	Trent Johnston	Cambusdoon New Ground	Ireland by 85 runs
Match 4	6 August	Denmark	Frederik Klokker	Italy	Alessandro Bonora	New Anniesland	Denmark by 55 runs
ODI 2399	6 August	Scotland	Craig Wright	Netherlands	Luuk van Troost	Cambusdoon New Ground	Scotland by 4 wkts
Match 6	7 August	Ireland	Kyle McCallan	Italy	Alessandro Bonora	Hamilton Crescent	Ireland by 7 wkts
ODI 2401	8 August	Ireland	Trent Johnston	Netherlands	Luuk van Troost	Cambusdoon New Ground	No result
Match 8	8 August	Scotland	Craig Wright	Denmark	Frederik Klokker	New Anniesland	Scotland by 3 runs
Match 9	9 August	Denmark	Frederik Klokker	Netherlands	Luuk van Troost	Shawholm	Netherlands by 4 wkts
Match 10 s	9 August	Scotland	Craig Wright	Italy	Alessandro Bonora	Hamilton Crescent	Scotland by 10 wkts

=== Kenya in Canada ===
This was originally scheduled to be a triangular series between Bermuda, Canada and Kenya. However, after Kenya rescheduled their ODIs with Bangladesh due to their lack of financial backing, they also cancelled their matches against Bermuda. The ODI series followed the Intercontinental Cup tie between the two nations, which Canada shaded by 25 runs; however, in the short form, Kenya won after bowling Canada out for 129 in the first match and 94 in the second.

Kenyans in Canada in 2006. ODI series: Kenya won 2–0.

No.	Date	Home captain	Away captain	Venue	Result
One-day International Schedule
ODI 2398	5 August	John Davison	Steve Tikolo	Toronto C.S.C.C., Toronto	Kenya by 108 runs
ODI 2400	6 August	John Davison	Steve Tikolo	Toronto C.S.C.C., Toronto	Kenya by 5 wkts

=== Bangladesh in Kenya ===
Bangladesh were originally scheduled to play three One Day International matches between 19 July and 23 July. However, the Kenyan board had to postpone the matches for three weeks due to lack of funds.

Bangladesh in Kenya in 2006. ODI series: Bangladesh won 3–0.

No.	Date	Home captain	Away captain	Venue	Result
One-Day Internationals Schedule
ODI 2402	12 August	Steve Tikolo	Khaled Mashud	Nairobi Gymkhana, Nairobi	Bangladesh by 6 wkts
ODI 2403	14 August	Steve Tikolo	Khaled Mashud	Nairobi Gymkhana, Nairobi	Bangladesh by 2 wkts
ODI 2404	15 August	Steve Tikolo	Khaled Mashud	Nairobi Gymkhana, Nairobi	Bangladesh by 6 wkts

=== India in Sri Lanka ===
As in 2005, Sri Lanka were set to start their international home season with a triangular series at home following a 2-Test series. India came to visit, in addition to the already touring South Africans, and the three teams were set to contest 2006 Unitech Cup. The first four matches was scheduled to be held in Dambulla, and the last three, two group matches and a final, will be held at the R. Premadasa Stadium in Colombo. However, the venue of the series became an issue in the elections for presidency of Sri Lanka Cricket, with the sitting presidents wishing to move the series to Colombo, as they feared sabotage from the opposition group if the opposition lost the elections. The opposition, however, wanted to host the matches in Dambulla. On 13 July, the Board of Control for Cricket in India said that their team would play all matches in Colombo, and a few days later a group of former cricketers were nominated to run Sri Lanka Cricket after the elections were cancelled after advice from the country's president, Mahinda Rajapakse.

The tournament was postponed by two days following rain and a bomb blast near the South African team hotel. After receiving an independent security report, the United Cricket Board of South Africa announced that they were pulling out of the tournament, leaving India and Sri Lanka to play a three-match series. The first of these games was rained off.

The series is later cancelled due to rain and bad weather during the three ODIs, the series will be played as a tri-series in 2007, after the World Cup.

Indians in Sri Lanka in 2006.

No.	Date	Home captain	Away captain	Venue	Result
One-day International Series
ODI 2405	18, 19 August	Mahela Jayawardene	Rahul Dravid	Sinhalese Sports Club Ground, Colombo	No result
2nd Match	20 August	Mahela Jayawardene	Rahul Dravid	Sinhalese Sports Club Ground, Colombo	No result
3rd Match	22 August	Mahela Jayawardene	Rahul Dravid	Sinhalese Sports Club Ground, Colombo	No result

=== Asian Cricket Council Trophy ===
This tournament is arranged by the Asian Cricket Council and is open to every non-Test member nation of the ACC. 17 nations are taking part in the event in Kuala Lumpur. At stake are places in the World Cricket League, along with berths in the 2008 Asia Cup.

Despite losing in the final, Hong Kong advanced to the World Cricket League Division Three due to U.A.E. already qualified for this league.

=== Bermuda in Canada ===
The last of these matches will be part of the Americas Cricket Championship.

No.	Date	Home captain	Away captain	Venue	Result
One-day International Schedule
ODI 2406	19 August	John Davison	Irvine Romaine	Toronto C.S.C.C., Toronto	Bermuda by 6 wkts
ODI 2407	21 August	John Davison	Irvine Romaine	Toronto C.S.C.C., Toronto	Bermuda by 11 runs

=== Americas Championship ===
Canada hosted the Americas Cricket Championship, and participated along with Argentina, Bermuda, Cayman Islands and USA. The tournament took place between 21 August and 26 August.

Canada, Bermuda and the USA had already qualified for the World Cricket League based on their performances in the 2005 ICC Trophy, and, as Cayman Islands finished in third place ahead of Argentina, the Caymans qualified for Division Three of the 2007 League. Bermuda won all their games except for a rained-off clash with USA, while Canada lost their first two and failed to get better than fourth despite a ten-wicket win over USA in the final game.

Final Table
Team	M	W	L	NR	Pts	NRR
Bermuda	4	3	0	1	14	+1.42
United States	4	2	1	1	10	+0.48
Cayman Islands	4	2	2	0	8	–0.26
Canada	4	2	2	0	8	+1.06
Argentina	4	0	4	0	0	–2.47

- Cayman Islands finished ahead of Canada due to head-to-head result.

No.	Date	Team 1	Captain	Team 2	Captain	Venue	Result
Group Stages
ODI 2407	21 August	Canada	John Davison	Bermuda	Irvine Romaine	Toronto C.S.C.C., Toronto	Bermuda by 11 runs
Match 2	21 August	United States	Steve Massiah	Cayman Islands	Ryan Bovell	King City Maple Leaf C.C., Ontario	United States by 106 runs
Match 3	22 August	Bermuda	Irvine Romaine	Argentina	Estaban McDermott	King City Maple Leaf C.C., Ontario	Bermuda by 111 runs
Match 4	22 August	Canada	John Davison	Cayman Islands	Steve Gordon	King City Maple Leaf C.C., Ontario	Cayman Islands by 8 wkts
Match 5	23 August	Bermuda	Irvine Romaine	Cayman Islands	Ryan Bovell	King City Maple Leaf C.C., Ontario	Bermuda by 93 runs
Match 6	23 August	United States	Steve Massiah	Argentina	Lucas Paterlini	King City Maple Leaf C.C., Ontario	United States by 7 wkts
Match 7	25 August	Bermuda	Irvine Romaine	United States	Steve Massiah	King City Maple Leaf C.C., Ontario	No result
Match 8	25 August	Canada	John Davison	Argentina	Estaban McDermott	King City Maple Leaf C.C., Ontario	Canada by 9 wkts (D/L)
Match 9	26 August	Canada	John Davison	United States	Steve Massiah	King City Maple Leaf C.C., Ontario	Canada by 10 wkts
Match 10	26 August	Argentina	Estaban McDermott	Cayman Islands	Ryan Bovell	King City Maple Leaf C.C., Ontario	Cayman Islands by 114 runs

=== African Championship ===
This tournament was held in Dar-es-Salaam between the five top African nations that have not already qualified for the global divisions of the World Cricket League through performances at the 2005 ICC Trophy. Five teams took part, four of which, Botswana, Nigeria, Tanzania and Zambia all took part at the 2004 Six Nations World Cup Qualifying Series Tournament in Africa, finishing from third to sixth, while Mozambique won the Africa Division Two event in April to qualify for this Division One tournament. The winner of this tournament, the hosts Tanzania, qualified for Division Three in the global World Cricket League.

Final Table
Team	M	W	L	NR	Pts
Tanzania	4	4	0	0	8
Botswana	4	3	1	0	6
Mozambique	4	2	2	0	4
Zambia	4	1	3	0	2
Nigeria	4	0	4	0	0

No.	Date	Team 1	Team 2	Result
Group Stages
Match 1	23 August	Mozambique	Tanzania	Tanzania by 151 runs
Match 2	23 August	Botswana	Nigeria	Botswana by 29 runs
Match 3	24 August	Botswana	Zambia	Botswana by 34 runs
Match 4	24 August	Nigeria	Tanzania	Tanzania by 111 runs
Match 5	25 August	Nigeria	Zambia	Zambia by 3 wkts
Match 6	25 August	Botswana	Mozambique	Botswana by 8 wkts
Match 7	26 August	Mozambique	Nigeria	Mozambique by 76 runs
Match 8	26 August	Tanzania	Zambia	Tanzania by 9 wkts
Match 9	27 August	Botswana	Tanzania	Tanzania by 8 wkts
Match 10	27 August	Mozambique	Zambia	Mozambique by 81 runs

== ICC Championship Tables in September 2006 ==
ICC Test Championship Table at 21 August
Pos	Nation	Points
1	Australia	130 (–1)
2	England	119 (+6)
3 (+1)	Pakistan	112 (+3)
4 (–1)	India	111
5 (+2)	Sri Lanka	103 (+8)
6 (–1)	South Africa	94 (–7)
7 (–1)	New Zealand	92 (–3)
8	West Indies	72
9	Zimbabwe	28 (+1)
10	Bangladesh	3 (+1)

ICC ODI Championship Table at 10 September
Pos	Nation	Points
1	Australia	131 (–1)
2	South Africa	123 (+4)
3	India	113 (–3)
4	Pakistan	111 (–3)
5	New Zealand	111 (–2)
6	Sri Lanka	107 (+2)
7 (+1)	West Indies	99 (+10)
8 (–1)	England	99 (–4)
9	Zimbabwe	35 (–7)
10	Bangladesh	33 (+10)
11	Kenya	0 (–7)

== Test statistics ==
=== Results ===
Test matches in the 2006 season: Results summary
Team	Played	Won	Lost	Drawn	% Won
Sri Lanka	5	3	1	1	60.00
England	7	4	1	2	57.14
India	4	1	0	3	25.00
West Indies	4	0	1	3	0.00
South Africa	2	0	2	0	0.00
Pakistan	4	0	3	1	0.00

=== Batting statistics ===
Test matches in the 2006 season: Most runs
No	Player	Team	Mat	Inn	NO	Runs	Avg	100s	50s
1	Mahela Jayawardene	Sri Lanka	5	9	0	740	82.22	3	1
2	Kevin Pietersen	England	7	12	0	707	58.91	3	1
3	Mohammad Yousuf	Pakistan	4	7	0	631	90.14	3	0
4	Andrew Strauss	England	7	12	0	600	50.00	2	2
5	Alastair Cook	England	7	12	1	578	52.54	2	2
Other team leaders
7	Rahul Dravid	India	4	7	1	496	82.66	1	4
12	Daren Ganga	West Indies	4	8	1	344	49.14	1	1
24	A. B. de Villiers	South Africa	2	4	0	217	54.25	0	2

Test matches in the 2006 season: Highest average (qualification: 5 innings)
No	Player	Team	Mat	Inn	NO	Runs	Avg	100s	50s
1	Ian Bell	England	4	7	3	375	93.75	3	0
2	Mohammad Yousuf	Pakistan	4	7	0	631	90.14	3	0
3	Rahul Dravid	India	4	7	1	496	82.66	1	4
4	Mahela Jayawardene	Sri Lanka	5	9	0	740	82.22	3	1
5	Younis Khan	Pakistan	3	5	0	329	65.80	1	1
Other team leaders
14	Daren Ganga	West Indies	4	8	1	344	49.14	1	1

=== Bowling statistics ===
Test matches in the 2006 season: Most wickets
No	Player	Team	Mat	Ovs	Runs	Wkts	Avg
1	Muttiah Muralitharan	Sri Lanka	5	309.2	802	46	17.43
2	Monty Panesar	England	7	283.2	725	27	26.85
3	Matthew Hoggard	England	7	274	842	25	33.68
4	Anil Kumble	India	4	223.1	658	23	28.60
5	Steve Harmison	England	4	151.3	542	20	27.10
Other team leaders
6	Umar Gul	Pakistan	4	158.2	614	18	34.11
7	Corey Collymore	West Indies	4	144.1	337	15	22.46
18	Dale Steyn	South Africa	2	61.5	292	8	36.50

Test matches in the 2006 season: Lowest average (qualification: 500 balls bowled)
No	Player	Team	Mat	Ovs	Runs	Wkts	Avg
1	Muttiah Muralitharan	Sri Lanka	5	309.2	802	46	17.43
2	Corey Collymore	West Indies	4	144.1	337	15	22.46
3	Virender Sehwag	India	4	89.1	209	9	23.22
4	Jerome Taylor	West Indies	3	95	341	14	24.35
5	Monty Panesar	England	7	283.2	725	27	26.85
Other team leaders
13	Umar Gul	Pakistan	4	158.2	614	18	34.11
21	Nicky Boje	South Africa	2	124.3	403	5	80.60

== ODI statistics ==
=== Results ===
One-day Internationals in the 2006 season: Results summary
Team	Played	Won	Lost	Tied/NR	% Won
Sri Lanka	8	7	0	1	87.50
West Indies	11	9	1	1	81.81
Bangladesh	8	5	3	0	62.50
Bermuda	5	3	2	0	60.00
Pakistan	6	3	2	1	50.00
Zimbabwe	14	6	7	1	42.85
Kenya	5	2	3	0	40.00
Ireland	3	1	1	1	33.33
Scotland	3	1	2	0	33.33
England	11	3	7	1	27.27
India	6	1	4	1	16.66
Netherlands	4	0	3	1	0.00
Canada	6	0	6	0	0.00

=== Batting statistics ===
One-day Internationals in the 2006 season: Most runs
No	Player	Team	Mat	Inn	NO	Runs	Avg	100s	50s
1	Ramnaresh Sarwan	West Indies	11	10	2	527	65.87	1	5
2	Brendan Taylor	Zimbabwe	14	14	3	494	44.90	0	3
3	Sanath Jayasuriya	Sri Lanka	7	6	0	479	79.83	3	0
4	Ian Bell	England	11	11	1	479	47.90	0	4
5	Chris Gayle	West Indies	10	10	1	452	50.22	1	2
Other team leaders
14	Shahriar Nafees	Bangladesh	8	8	1	291	41.57	1	1
17	Younis Khan	Pakistan	6	6	1	240	48.00	1	1
18	Virender Sehwag	India	6	6	1	237	47.40	0	2
24	Irvine Romaine	Bermuda	5	4	0	211	52.75	1	1
38	Steve Tikolo	Kenya	5	5	1	140	35.00	0	1
39	George Codrington	Canada	5	5	1	139	34.75	0	0
40	Ryan Watson	Scotland	3	3	0	137	45.66	0	1
44	Kyle McCallan	Ireland	3	3	2	120	120.00	0	1
46	Darron Reekers	Netherlands	4	4	0	118	29.50	0	0

One-day Internationals in the 2006 season: Highest average (qualification: 5 innings)
No	Player	Team	Mat	Inn	NO	Runs	Avg	100s	50s
1	Sanath Jayasuriya	Sri Lanka	7	6	0	479	79.83	3	0
2	Mohammad Yousuf	Pakistan	6	5	2	232	77.33	0	2
3	Mahela Jayawardene	Sri Lanka	8	7	2	362	72.40	2	1
4	Ramnaresh Sarwan	West Indies	11	10	2	527	65.87	1	5
5	Upul Tharanga	Sri Lanka	8	7	0	437	62.42	2	2
Other team leaders
7	Mohammad Kaif	India	6	5	1	205	51.25	0	3
10	Ian Bell	England	11	11	1	479	47.90	0	4
14	Farhad Reza	Bangladesh	7	6	2	185	46.25	0	1
17	Brendan Taylor	Zimbabwe	14	14	3	494	44.90	0	3
25	Steve Tikolo	Kenya	5	5	1	140	35.00	0	1
26	George Codrington	Canada	5	5	1	139	34.75	0	0
43	Saleem Mukuddem	Bermuda	5	5	1	87	21.75	0	0

=== Bowling statistics ===
One-day Internationals in the 2006 season: Most wickets
No	Player	Team	Mat	Ovs	Runs	Wkts	Avg
1	Tawanda Mupariwa	Zimbabwe	10	93	438	22	19.90
2	Mashrafe Mortaza	Bangladesh	7	64	250	17	14.70
3	Blessing Mahwire	Zimbabwe	12	91.4	426	15	28.40
4	Dwayne Bravo	West Indies	9	62.5	283	14	20.21
5	Jerome Taylor	West Indies	8	67	286	14	20.42
Other team leaders
7	Lasith Malinga	West Indies	7	56.2	283	13	21.76
10	Steve Harmison	England	6	60	344	11	31.27
11	George O'Brien	Bermuda	4	40	195	10	19.50
12	Dave Langford-Smith	Ireland	3	27	136	9	15.11
13	Ajit Agarkar	India	6	47	163	9	18.11
14	Shoaib Akhtar	Pakistan	6	36	168	9	18.66
16	John Davison	Canada	6	51	208	9	23.11
24	Hiren Varaiya	Kenya	3	23.2	82	7	11.71
32	Darron Reekers	Netherlands	4	31	190	7	27.14
55	Craig Wright	Scotland	2	13	55	4	13.75

One-day Internationals in the 2006 season: Lowest average (qualification: 250 balls bowled)
No	Player	Team	Mat	Ovs	Runs	Wkts	Avg
1	Mashrafe Mortaza	Bangladesh	7	64	250	17	14.70
2	Ajit Agarkar	India	6	47	163	9	18.11
3	Tawanda Mupariwa	Zimbabwe	10	93	438	22	19.90
4	Dwayne Bravo	West Indies	9	62.5	283	14	20.21
5	Jerome Taylor	West Indies	8	67	286	14	20.42
Other team leaders
8	Lasith Malinga	Sri Lanka	7	56.2	283	13	21.76
9	Peter Ongondo	Kenya	5	42	154	7	22.00
10	John Davison	Canada	6	51	208	9	23.11
11	Mohammad Asif	Pakistan	6	57	209	9	23.22
14	Steve Harmison	England	6	60	344	11	31.27
29	Saleem Mukuddem	Bermuda	5	46	196	3	65.33

== Further references ==
- The CricInfo Archives - 2006
