= International cricket in 2005 =

Cricket season

The international cricket season in 2005 lasted from April to September 2005.

== Season overview ==
International tours
Start date	Home team	Away team	Results [Matches]		
Start date	Home team	Away team	Test	ODI	T20I
18 May 2005	West Indies	Pakistan	1–1 [2]	0–3 [3]	–
26 May 2005	England	Bangladesh	2–0 [2]	–	–
13 June 2005	England	Australia	2–1 [5]	1–2 [3]	1–0 [1]
13 July 2005	Sri Lanka	West Indies	2–0 [2]	–	–
7 August 2005	Zimbabwe	New Zealand	0–2 [2]	–	–
31 August 2005	Sri Lanka	Bangladesh	2–0 [2]	3–0 [3]	–
13 September 2005	Zimbabwe	India	0–2 [2]	–	–
International tournaments
Dates	Tournament			Winners	
16 June 2005	(England) NatWest Series			Trophy shared	
30 July 2005	(Sri Lanka) Indian Oil Cup			Sri Lanka	
17 August 2005	(South Africa) Afro-Asian Cup			Tied series	
24 August 2005	(Zimbabwe) Videocon Tri-Series			New Zealand	
Minor tournaments
Start date	Tournament			Winners	
22 April 2005	ICC Intercontinental Cup			Ireland	
1 July 2005	(Republic of Ireland) ICC Trophy			Scotland	

== Rankings ==
The following are the rankings at the start of the season

ICC Test Championship 19 May 2005
Rank	Team	Points
1	Australia	132
2	England	110
3	India	107
4	Pakistan	102
5	Sri Lanka	100
6	South Africa	100
7	New Zealand	97
8	West Indies	73
9	Zimbabwe	41
10	Bangladesh	6

ICC ODI Championship 19 May 2005
Rank	Team	Points
1	Australia	140
2	Sri Lanka	117
3	India	116
4	South Africa	112
5	Pakistan	110
6	England	103
7	West Indies	98
8	New Zealand	97
9	Zimbabwe	50
10	Kenya	26
11	Bangladesh	11

== April ==
=== ICC Intercontinental Cup ===
Africa
Team	Pld	W	D	L	Pts
Kenya	2	1	1	0	49
Namibia	2	1	1	0	46.5
Uganda	2	0	0	2	32

Asia
Team	Pld	W	D	L	Pts
United Arab Emirates	2	1	0	1	41
Nepal	2	1	1	0	40.5
Hong Kong	2	0	1	1	18

Europe
Team	Pld	W	D	L	Pts
Ireland	2	1	1	0	41
Scotland	2	0	1	1	21
Netherlands	2	0	2	0	11.5

America
Team	Pld	W	D	L	Pts
Bermuda	2	2	0	0	62
Canada	2	1	0	1	50
Cayman Islands	2	0	0	2	23

No.	Date	Team 1	Captain	Team 2	Captain	Venue	Result
Group Stages
African Group
First-class	22–24 April	Uganda	Joel Olwenyi	Kenya	Steve Tikolo	Lugogo Cricket Oval, Kampala	Kenya by 161 runs
First-class	13–15 May	Uganda	Joel Olwenyi	Namibia	Deon Kotze	Lugogo Cricket Oval, Kampala	Namibia by 3 wickets
First-class	3–5 June	Namibia	Deon Kotze	Kenya	Steve Tikolo	Wanderers Cricket Ground, Windhoek	Match drawn
Asian Group
First-class	24–26 April	United Arab Emirates	Mohammad Tauqir	Hong Kong	Tim Smart	Sharjah Cricket Association Stadium, Sharjah	United Arab Emirates by 7 wickets
First-class	30 April–2 May	Nepal	Binod Das	Hong Kong	Tim Smart	Tribhuvan University International Cricket Ground, Kirtipur	Match drawn
First-class	7–9 May	Nepal	Binod Das	United Arab Emirates	Mohammad Tauqir	Tribhuvan University International Cricket Ground, Kirtipur	Nepal by 172 runs
European Group
First-class	29–31 July	Netherlands	Jeroen Smits	Scotland	Craig Wright	Kampong, Utrecht	Match drawn
First-class	13–15 August	Scotland	Craig Wright	Ireland	Jason Molins	Mannofield Park, Aberdeen	Ireland by 3 runs
First-class	23–25 August	Ireland	Jason Molins	Netherlands	Bastiaan Zuiderent	Civil Service Cricket Club, Belfast	Match drawn
North American Group
First-class	23–25 August	Canada	Pubudu Dassanayake	Bermuda	Clay Smith	Toronto Cricket, Skating and Curling Club, Toronto	Bermuda by 48 runs
First-class	27–29 August	Bermuda	Clay Smith	Cayman Islands	Ryan Bovell	Toronto Cricket, Skating and Curling Club, Toronto	Bermuda by an innings and 105 runs
First-class	31 August–2 September	Canada	Pubudu Dassanayake	Cayman Islands	Ryan Bovell	Toronto Cricket, Skating and Curling Club, Toronto	Canada by 120 runs

No.	Date	Team 1	Captain	Team 2	Captain	Venue	Result
Semi-Finals
First-class	23–25 October	Bermuda	Clay Smith	Kenya	Steve Tikolo	United Ground, Windhoek	Match drawn; Kenya win on points
First-class	23–25 October	Ireland	Trent Johnston	United Arab Emirates	Arshad Ali	Wanderers Cricket Ground, Windhoek	Match drawn; Ireland win on points
Final
First-class	27–29 October	Kenya	Steve Tikolo	Ireland	Trent Johnston	Wanderers Cricket Ground, Windhoek	Ireland by 6 wickets

== May ==
=== Pakistan in the West Indies ===
No.	Date	Home captain	Away captain	Venue	Result
ODI series
ODI 2246	18 May	Shivnarine Chanderpaul	Inzamam-ul-Haq	Arnos Vale Ground, Kingstown, St. Vincent	Pakistan by 59 runs
ODI 2247	21 May	Shivnarine Chanderpaul	Inzamam-ul-Haq	Beausejour Stadium, Gros Islet, St. Lucia	Pakistan by 40 runs
ODI 2248	22 May	Shivnarine Chanderpaul	Younis Khan	Beausejour Stadium, Gros Islet, St. Lucia	Pakistan by 22 runs
Test series
Test 1752	26–29 May	Shivnarine Chanderpaul	Younis Khan	Kensington Oval, Bridgetown, Barbados	West Indies by 276 runs
Test 1754	3–7 June	Shivnarine Chanderpaul	Inzamam-ul-Haq	Sabina Park, Kingston, Jamaica	Pakistan by 136 runs

=== Bangladesh in England ===
No.	Date	Home captain	Away captain	Venue	Result
Test series
Test 1751	26–28 May	Michael Vaughan	Habibul Bashar	Lord's, London	England by an innings and 261 runs
Test 1753	3–5 June	Michael Vaughan	Habibul Bashar	Riverside Ground, Chester-le-Street	England by an innings and 27 runs

== June ==
=== Australia in England ===
No.	Date	Home captain	Away captain	Venue	Result
Only T20I
T20I 2	13 June	Michael Vaughan	Ricky Ponting	The Rose Bowl, Southampton	England by 100 runs
ODI series
ODI 2259	7 July	Michael Vaughan	Ricky Ponting	Headingley, Leeds	England by 9 wickets
ODI 2260	10 July	Michael Vaughan	Ricky Ponting	Lord's, London	Australia by 7 wickets
ODI 2261	12 July	Michael Vaughan	Ricky Ponting	The Oval, London	Australia by 8 wickets
Test series
Test 1756	21–24 July	Michael Vaughan	Ricky Ponting	Lord's, London	Australia by 239 runs
Test 1758	4–7 August	Michael Vaughan	Ricky Ponting	Edgbaston, Birmingham	England by 2 runs
Test 1760	11–15 August	Michael Vaughan	Ricky Ponting	Old Trafford, Manchester	Match drawn
Test 1762	25–28 August	Michael Vaughan	Ricky Ponting	Trent Bridge, Nottingham	England by 3 wickets
Test 1763	8–12 September	Michael Vaughan	Ricky Ponting	The Oval, London	Match drawn

=== NatWest Series ===
Team	Pld	W	L	NR	Pts	NRR
England	6	4	1	1	26	+1.38
Australia	6	3	2	1	22	+0.89
Bangladesh	6	1	5	0	6	−2.01

Group stage
No.	Date	Team 1	Captain	Team 2	Captain	Venue	Result
ODI 2249	16 June	England	Michael Vaughan	Bangladesh	Habibul Bashar	The Oval, London	England by 10 wickets
ODI 2250	18 June	Australia	Ricky Ponting	Bangladesh	Habibul Bashar	Sophia Gardens, Cardiff	Bangladesh by 5 wickets
ODI 2251	19 June	England	Michael Vaughan	Australia	Ricky Ponting	County Ground, Bristol	England by 3 wickets
ODI 2252	21 June	England	Michael Vaughan	Bangladesh	Habibul Bashar	Trent Bridge, Nottingham	England by 168 runs
ODI 2253	23 June	England	Marcus Trescothick	Australia	Ricky Ponting	Riverside Ground, Chester-le-Street	Australia by 57 runs
ODI 2254	25 June	Australia	Ricky Ponting	Bangladesh	Habibul Bashar	Old Trafford, Manchester	Australia by 10 wickets
ODI 2255	26 June	England	Marcus Trescothick	Bangladesh	Habibul Bashar	Headingley, Leeds	England by 5 wickets
ODI 2256	28 June	England	Michael Vaughan	Australia	Ricky Ponting	Edgbaston, Birmingham	No result
ODI 2257	30 June	Australia	Ricky Ponting	Bangladesh	Habibul Bashar	St Lawrence Ground, Canterbury	Australia by 6 wickets
Final
No.	Date	Team 1	Captain	Team 2	Captain	Venue	Result
ODI 2258	2 July	England	Michael Vaughan	Australia	Ricky Ponting	Lord's, London	Match tied

== July ==
=== ICC Trophy ===
Group A
Team	Pld	W	L	NR	Pts	NRR
Ireland	5	4	0	1	9	+1.49
Bermuda	5	3	1	1	7	+0.70
United Arab Emirates	5	2	2	1	5	+0.43
Denmark	5	2	2	1	5	−0.21
Uganda	5	1	3	1	3	−1.05
United States	5	0	4	1	1	−1.39

Group B
Team	Pld	W	L	NR	Pts	NRR
Scotland	5	5	0	0	10	+2.07
Canada	5	4	1	0	8	+0.79
Netherlands	5	3	2	0	6	+0.43
Namibia	5	2	3	0	4	+0.31
Papua New Guinea	5	1	4	0	2	−2.20
Oman	5	0	5	0	0	−2.59

Group A
No.	Date	Team 1	Captain	Team 2	Captain	Venue	Result
ICCT 421	1 July	Denmark	Carsten Pedersen	Uganda	Joel Olwenyi	Muckamore	Denmark by 28 runs
ICCT 422	1 July	Ireland	Jason Molins	Bermuda	Clay Smith	Stormont, Belfast	Ireland by 97 runs
ICCT 425	1 July	United Arab Emirates	Khuram Khan	United States	Richard Staple	Downpatrick	United Arab Emirates by 55 runs
ICCT 426	2 July	Bermuda	Janeiro Tucker	United Arab Emirates	Khuram Khan	Lisburn	Bermuda by 30 runs
ICCT 428	2 July	Denmark	Carsten Pedersen	United States	Richard Staple	Armagh	Denmark by 96 runs
ICCT 429	2 July	Ireland	Jason Molins	Uganda	Joel Olwenyi	Comber	Ireland by 127 runs
ICCT 432	4 July	Bermuda	Janeiro Tucker	Denmark	Carsten Pedersen	Greenisland	Bermuda by 93 runs
ICCT 434	4 July	Ireland	Jason Molins	United Arab Emirates	Khuram Khan	Stormont, Belfast	Ireland by 2 wickets
ICCT 437	4 July	Uganda	Joel Olwenyi	United States	Richard Staple	Lurgan	Uganda by 6 wickets
ICCT 438	5 July	Bermuda	Janeiro Tucker	Uganda	Joel Olwenyi	Comber	No result
ICCT 439	5 July	Denmark	Carsten Pedersen	United Arab Emirates	Khuram Khan	Bangor	No result
ICCT 437a	5 July	Ireland	Jason Molins	United States	Richard Staple	Waringstown	Match abandoned
ICCT 443	7 July	Bermuda	Janeiro Tucker	United States	Richard Staple	Waringstown	Bermuda by 113 runs
ICCT 445	7 July	Ireland	Jason Molins	Denmark	Carsten Pedersen	Bangor	Ireland by 73 runs
ICCT 448	7 July	Uganda	Joel Olwenyi	United Arab Emirates	Khuram Khan	Lurgan	United Arab Emirates by 63 runs

Group B
No.	Date	Team 1	Captain	Team 2	Captain	Venue	Result
ICCT 420	1 July	Canada	John Davison	Namibia	Deon Kotze	Belfast	Canada by 2 runs
ICCT 423	1 July	Netherlands	Luuk van Troost	Papua New Guinea	Rarua Dikana	Belfast	Netherlands by 9 wickets
ICCT 424	1 July	Oman	Azhar Ali	Scotland	Craig Wright	Belfast	Scotland by 6 wickets
ICCT 427	2 July	Canada	John Davison	Scotland	Craig Wright	Bangor	Scotland by 7 wickets
ICCT 430	2 July	Namibia	Deon Kotze	Papua New Guinea	Rarua Dikana	Belfast	NAM by 96 runs
ICCT 431	2 July	Netherlands	Luuk van Troost	Oman	Azhar Ali	Carrickfergus	Netherlands by 258 runs
ICCT 433	4 July	Canada	John Davison	Oman	Azhar Ali	Muckamore	Canada by 2 wickets
ICCT 435	4 July	Namibia	Deon Kotze	Netherlands	Luuk van Troost	Belfast	Netherlands by 6 wickets
ICCT 436	4 July	Papua New Guinea	Rarua Dikana	Scotland	Craig Wright	Belfast	Scotland by 5 wickets
ICCT 440	5 July	Canada	John Davison	Netherlands	Luuk van Troost	Eglinton	Canada by 2 wickets
ICCT 441	5 July	Namibia	Deon Kotze	Scotland	Craig Wright	Limavady	Scotland by 27 runs
ICCT 442	5 July	Oman	Azhar Ali	Papua New Guinea	Rarua Dikana	Drummond	Papua New Guinea by 93 runs
ICCT 444	7 July	Canada	John Davison	Papua New Guinea	Rarua Dikana	Downpatrick	Canada by 160 runs
ICCT 446	7 July	Namibia	Deon Kotze	Oman	Azhar Ali	Comber	Namibia by 6 wickets
ICCT 447	7 July	Scotland	Craig Wright	Netherlands	Luuk van Troost	Stormont, Belfast	Scotland by 98 runs

Knock-Out Stages
No.	Date	Team 1	Captain	Team 2	Captain	Venue	Result	Type of match
Semi-Finals
ICCT 449	9 July	Bermuda	Clay Smith	Scotland	Craig Wright	The Hills, Dublin	Scotland by 6 wickets	
ICCT 450	9 July	Ireland	Jason Molins	Canada	John Davison	Clontarf, Dublin	Ireland by 4 wickets	
5th Place Semi-Finals
ICCT 451	9 July	Netherlands	Luuk van Troost	Denmark	Carsten Pedersen	County Dublin	Netherlands by 89 runs	
ICCT 452	9 July	Namibia	Deon Kotze	United Arab Emirates	Khuram Khan	Malahide	United Arab Emirates by 4 wickets	
9th Place Semi-Finals
ICCT 453	9 July	Oman	Azhar Ali	Uganda	Joel Olwenyi	Rathmines	Oman by 6 runs	
ICCT 454	9 July	Papua New Guinea	Rarua Dikana	United States	Richard Staple	Merrion	United States by 8 wickets	
Placement Matches
ICCT 455	11 July	Bermuda	Clay Smith	Canada	John Davison	Malahide	Canada by 5 wickets	3rd Place Play-off
ICCT 457	11 July	Netherlands	Luuk van Troost	United Arab Emirates	Khuram Khan	Clontarf, Dublin	Netherlands by 145 runs	5th Place Play-off
ICCT 456	11 July	Denmark	Carsten Pedersen	Namibia	Deon Kotze	The Hills, Dublin	Namibia by 103 runs	7th Place Play-off
ICCT 458	11 July	Oman	Azhar Ali	United States	Richard Staple	County Dublin	Oman by 3 wickets	9th Place Play-off
ICCT 459	11 July	Papua New Guinea	Rarua Dikana	United States	Richard Staple	Merrion	United States by 8 wickets	11th Place Play-off
ICCT 460	13 July	Ireland	Kyle McCallan	Scotland	Craig Wright	Clontarf, Dublin	Scotland by 47 runs	Final

=== West Indies in Sri Lanka ===
No.	Date	Home captain	Away captain	Venue	Result
Test series
Test 1755	13–16 July	Marvan Atapattu	Shivnarine Chanderpaul	Sinhalese Sports Club Ground, Colombo	Sri Lanka by 6 wickets
Test 1757	22–25 July	Marvan Atapattu	Shivnarine Chanderpaul	Asgiriya Stadium, Kandy	Sri Lanka by 240 runs

=== Indian Oil Cup in Sri Lanka ===
Team	Pld	W	L	NR	Pts	NRR
Sri Lanka	4	3	1	0	17	+0.19
India	4	2	2	0	13	+0.26
West Indies	4	1	3	0	6	−0.46

Group Stage
No.	Date	Team 1	Captain	Team 2	Captain	Venue	Result
ODI 2262	30 July	Sri Lanka	Marvan Atapattu	India	Rahul Dravid	Rangiri Dambulla International Stadium, Dambulla	Sri Lanka by 3 wickets
ODI 2263	31 July	West Indies	Shivnarine Chanderpaul	India	Rahul Dravid	Rangiri Dambulla International Stadium, Dambulla	India by 6 wickets
ODI 2264	2 August	Sri Lanka	Marvan Atapattu	West Indies	Shivnarine Chanderpaul	Rangiri Dambulla International Stadium, Dambulla	Sri Lanka by 50 runs
ODI 2265	3 August	Sri Lanka	Marvan Atapattu	India	Rahul Dravid	Rangiri Dambulla International Stadium, Dambulla	Sri Lanka by 4 wickets
ODI 2266	6 August	Sri Lanka	Mahela Jayawardene	West Indies	Shivnarine Chanderpaul	R. Premadasa Stadium, Colombo	West Indies by 33 runs
ODI 2267	7 August	West Indies	Sylvester Joseph	India	Rahul Dravid	R. Premadasa Stadium, Colombo	India by 7 runs
Final
No.	Date	Team 1	Captain	Team 2	Captain	Venue	Result
ODI 2268	9 August	Sri Lanka	Marvan Atapattu	India	Rahul Dravid	R. Premadasa Stadium, Colombo	Sri Lanka by 18 runs

== August ==
=== Afro-Asian Cup ===
No.	Date	Home captain	Away captain	Venue	Result
ODI 2269	17 August	Shaun Pollock	Inzamam-ul-Haq	SuperSport Park, Centurion	AFR by 2 runs
ODI 2270	20 August	Shaun Pollock	Inzamam-ul-Haq	Kingsmead, Durban	ASI by 17 runs
ODI 2271	21 August	Graeme Smith	Inzamam-ul-Haq	Kingsmead, Durban	No result

=== New Zealanders in Zimbabwe ===
No.	Date	Home captain	Away captain	Venue	Result
Test series
Test 1759	7–8 August	Tatenda Taibu	Stephen Fleming	Harare Sports Club, Harare	New Zealand by an innings and 294 runs
Test 1761	15–17 August	Tatenda Taibu	Stephen Fleming	Queens Sports Club, Bulawayo	New Zealand by an innings and 46 runs

=== Videocon Tri-Series ===
Team	Pld	W	L	NR	Pts	NRR
New Zealand	4	3	1	0	18	+1.32
India	4	3	1	0	16	+0.68
Zimbabwe	4	0	4	0	2	-2.03

No.	Date	Team 1	Captain	Team 2	Captain	Venue	Result
Group Stages
ODI 2272	24 August	Zimbabwe	Tatenda Taibu	New Zealand	Stephen Fleming	Queens Sports Club, Bulawayo	New Zealand by 192 runs
ODI 2273	26 August	India	Sourav Ganguly	New Zealand	Stephen Fleming	Queens Sports Club, Bulawayo	New Zealand by 51 runs
ODI 2274	29 August	Zimbabwe	Tatenda Taibu	India	Sourav Ganguly	Harare Sports Club, Harare	India by 161 runs
ODI 2276	31 August	Zimbabwe	Tatenda Taibu	New Zealand	Stephen Fleming	Harare Sports Club, Harare	New Zealand by 27 runs
ODI 2278	2 September	India	Sourav Ganguly	New Zealand	Stephen Fleming	Harare Sports Club, Harare	India by 6 wickets
ODI 2280	4 September	Zimbabwe	Tatenda Taibu	India	Sourav Ganguly	Harare Sports Club, Harare	India by 4 wickets
No.	Date	Team 1	Captain	Team 2	Captain	Venue	Result
Final
ODI 2281	6 September	India	Sourav Ganguly	New Zealand	Stephen Fleming	Harare Sports Club, Harare	New Zealand by 6 wickets

=== Bangladesh in Sri Lanka ===
No.	Date	Home captain	Away captain	Venue	Result
ODI series
ODI 2275	31 August	Marvan Atapattu	Habibul Bashar	Sinhalese Sports Club Ground, Colombo	Sri Lanka by 88 runs
ODI 2277	2 September	Marvan Atapattu	Habibul Bashar	R. Premadasa Stadium, Colombo	Sri Lanka by 75 runs
ODI 2279	4 September	Mahela Jayawardene	Habibul Bashar	R. Premadasa Stadium, Colombo	Sri Lanka by 6 wickets (D/L)
Test series
Test 1764	12–14 September	Marvan Atapattu	Habibul Bashar	R. Premadasa Stadium, Colombo	Sri Lanka by an innings and 96 runs
Test 1766	20–22 September	Marvan Atapattu	Habibul Bashar	P. Saravanamuttu Stadium, Colombo	Sri Lanka by an innings and 69 runs

== September ==
=== India in Zimbabwe ===
No.	Date	Home captain	Away captain	Venue	Result
Test series
Test 1765	13−16 September	Tatenda Taibu	Sourav Ganguly	Queens Sports Club, Bulawayo	India by an innings and 90 runs
Test 1767	20−22 September	Tatenda Taibu	Sourav Ganguly	Harare Sports Club, Harare	India by 10 wickets
