= 2006–07 Associates Triangular Series in South Africa =

Associates Triangular Series in South Africa in 2006–07
- Date: 26 November – 2 December 2006
- Location: South Africa
- Result: Winner – Netherlands
Teams
| Bermuda | Canada | Netherlands |
Captains
| Irvine Romaine | George Codrington | Luuk van Troost |
Most runs
| David Hemp 124 Saleem Mukuddem 120 Irvine Romaine 96 | Desmond Chumney 158; Ashish Bagai 151; Abdool Samad 104 | Ryan ten Doeschate 164; Bas Zuiderent 114; Daan van Bunge 90 |
Most wickets
| Kevin Hurdle 6 Saleem Mukuddem 5 Dwayne Leverock 4 | Henry Osinde & Sunil Dhaniram 7 wickets George Codrington 6 | Tim de Leede 7 Mark Jonkman 5 Daan van Bunge 4 |

The Associates Triangular Series in South Africa was a One Day International cricket tournament involving the national teams of Canada, Netherlands and Bermuda, held in South Africa.

== Points Table ==
| Place | Team | Played | Won | Lost | Points | NetRR |
|---|---|---|---|---|---|---|
| 1 | Netherlands | 4 | 3 | 1 | 13 | −0.423 |
| 2 | Canada | 4 | 2 | 2 | 9 | +0.242 |
| 3 | Bermuda | 4 | 1 | 3 | 5 | +0.166 |

== Matches ==
26 November 2006
scorecard

| Netherlands; 271/8 (50 overs) | v | Canada; 254/8 (50 overs) |
| Ryan ten Doeschate 49 (44); Sunil Dhaniram 3/34 (10 overs) | | Don Maxwell 59 (69); Luuk van Troost 2/29 (5 overs) |

Netherlands won by 17 runs
Sedgars Park, Potchefstroom, South Africa
Umpires: Jeff Luck and Russell Tiffin
Player of the match: Ryan ten Doeschate

- Ashif Mulla (Can) and Mark Jonkman (Ned) made their ODI debuts.

27 November 2006
scorecard

| Bermuda; 235/8 (50 overs) | v | Canada; 239/5 (47.5 overs) |
| David Hemp 55 (70); Henry Osinde 2/34 (6 overs) | | Sunil Dhaniram 63 (42); Janeiro Tucker 2/23 (10 overs) |

Canada won by 5 wickets
Sedgars Park, Potchefstroom, South Africa
Umpires: Jeff Luck and Russell Tiffin
Player of the match: Sunil Dhaniram

28 November 2006
scorecard

| Bermuda; 177 all out (46 overs) | v | Netherlands; 180/2 (37.5 overs) |
| Saleem Mukuddem 43 (76); Tim de Leede 3/26 (10 overs) | | Ryan ten Doeschate 65 (78); Hasan Durham 1/43 (7.5 overs) |

Netherlands won by 8 wickets
Sedgars Park, Potchefstroom, South Africa
Umpires: Jeff Luck and Russell Tiffin
Player of the match: Tim de Leede

- Maurits van Nierop (Ned) made his ODI debut.

30 November 2006
scorecard

| Bermuda; 178/9 (50 overs) | v | Canada; 179/7 (39.4 overs) |
| Saleem Mukuddem 57 (104); George Codrington 4/33 (6 overs) | | Abdool Samad 39 (70); Hasan Durham 3/52 (10 overs) |

Canada won by 3 wickets
Willowmoore Park, Benoni, South Africa
Umpires: Subhash Modi and Russell Tiffin
Player of the match: George Codrington

1 December 2006
scorecard

| Canada; 223/8 (50 overs) | v | Netherlands; 205/9 (41.4 overs) |
| Desmond Chumney 44 (65); Tim de Leede 2/29 (10 overs) | | Daan van Bunge 52 (64); Umar Bhatti 2/25 (9 overs) |

Netherlands won by 1 wicket (D/L Method)
Willowmoore Park, Benoni, South Africa
Umpires: Subhash Modi and Russell Tiffin
Player of the match: Billy Stelling

- Netherlands' innings was stopped after the fourth ball in the 41st over because of rain.

2 December 2006
scorecard

| Netherlands; 91 all out (26.4 overs) | v | Bermuda; 94/4 (17 overs) |
| Mark Jonkman 15 (22); Saleem Mukuddem 4/40 (10 overs) | | David Hemp 36* (18); Tim de Leede 2/22 (4 overs) |

Bermuda won by 6 wickets
Willowmoore Park, Benoni, South Africa
Umpires: Subhash Modi and Russell Tiffin
Player of the match: Saleem Mukuddem

== See also ==
Other triangular series featuring ICC associate members:

- Associates Triangular Series in Kenya in 2006–07
- Associates Triangular Series in West Indies in 2006–07
- Dubai Triangular Series 2014–15
