= Associates Triangular Series in Kenya in 2006–07 =

The Associates Triangular Series in Kenya was a One Day International tournament involving the national teams of Canada, Kenya and Scotland, held in Mombasa. Each team played each other twice. The event took place at the Mombasa Sports Club.

== Points Table ==
Place	Team	Played	Won	Lost	Points	NetRR
1	Kenya	4	3	1	13	+0.847
2	Scotland	4	2	2	8	-0.906
3	Canada	4	1	3	5	+0.364

== Matches ==
17 January 2007
scorecard

Kenya; 328/5 (50 overs)	v	Scotland; 138 all out (36.2 overs)
David Obuya 73 (74); Paul Hoffmann 2/45 (10 overs)		Dougie Brown 22 (21); Nehemiah Odhiambo 3/25 (7 overs)

Kenya won by 190 runs
Mombasa Sports Club Ground, Mombasa, Kenya
Umpires: Ian Gould and Buddhi Pradhan

18 January 2007
scorecard

Canada; 292/5 (50 overs)	v	Scotland; 293/8 (49.5 overs)
Qaiser Ali 70 (82); Dougie Brown 2/73 (10 overs)		Ryan Watson 123 (120)*; George Codrington 2/38 (7.5 overs)

Scotland won by 2 wickets
Mombasa Sports Club Ground, Mombasa, Kenya
Umpires: Darrell Hair and Buddhi Pradhan

20 January 2007
scorecard

Kenya	v	Canada

Kenya won by walkover without a ball bowled
Mombasa Sports Club Ground, Mombasa, Kenya
Umpires: Darrell Hair and Ian Gould

- The match was forfeited and Kenya were awarded the four points as Canada could not field a team due to player illness.

21 January 2007
scorecard

Kenya; 259/9 (50 overs)	v	Scotland; 253/8 (50 overs)
Ravi Shah 113 (121); Dougie Brown 3/37 (10 overs)		Majid Haq 59 (102); Steve Tikolo 4/41 (10 overs)

Kenya won by 6 runs
Mombasa Sports Club Ground, Mombasa, Kenya
Umpires: Darrell Hair and Ian Gould

23 January 2007
scorecard

Canada; 208 all out (44.3 overs)	v	Scotland; 209/8 (47.2 overs)
Sunil Dhaniram 46 (57); Craig Wright 4/29 (8.3 overs)		Majid Haq 45 (44); Sunil Dhaniram 2/24 (8.2 overs)

Scotland won by 2 wickets
Mombasa Sports Club Ground, Mombasa, Kenya
Umpires: Darrell Hair and Buddhi Pradhan

24 January 2007
scorecard

Canada; 213/9 (50 overs)	v	Kenya; 144 all out (35.1 overs)
Abdool Samad 50 (101); Hiren Varaiya 3/36 (10 overs)		Ravi Shah 48 (63); Kevin Sandher 3/24 (10 overs)

Canada won by 69 runs
Mombasa Sports Club Ground, Mombasa, Kenya
Umpires: Ian Gould and Buddhi Pradhan

== See also ==
Other triangular series featuring ICC associate members:

- Associates Triangular Series in South Africa in 2006–07
- Associates Triangular Series in West Indies in 2006–07
- Dubai Triangular Series 2014–15
