= Ernst van Giezen =

Dutch cricketer

Personal information
- Full name: Ernst Steven van Giezen
- Born: 1 July 1977 (age 49); Schiedam, Netherlands
- Batting: Left-handed
- Bowling: Left-arm fast-medium

International information
- National side: Netherlands (2005)
- Source: CricketArchive, 21 February 2016

Ernst Steven van Giezen (born 1 July 1977) is a former Dutch international cricketer who represented the Dutch national side in a single match in 2005. He played as a left-arm pace bowler.

Van Giezen was born in Schiedam, and played his club cricket for Hermes DVS and VOC Rotterdam. He made his senior debut for the Netherlands in August 2005, in an Intercontinental Cup game against Ireland. In the match, which held first-class status, he opened the bowling with Edgar Schiferli in Ireland's only innings, taking 2/107. In April 2006, van Giezen represented a Netherlands A team in the EurAsia Cricket Series, where matches held List A status. In the opening match against India A, he was the only Dutch bowler to take a wicket, finishing with 3/48 as his team lost by 202 runs. He took 2/57 in the next match, against Sri Lanka A, but in the final match against Pakistan A went wicketless.
