= Associates Triangular Series in West Indies in 2006–07 =

2006-07 Associates Tri-Series (West Indies)
- Date: February 25, 2007 – February 28, 2007
- Location: West Indies
- Result: Bangladesh won the series
Teams
Bangladesh	Bermuda	Canada
Captains
Habibul Bashar	Irving Romaine	John Davison
Most runs
Shakib Al Hasan (176) Shahriar Nafees (104) Mohammad Ashraful (60)	Lionel Cann (75); Saleem Mukuddem (65); Oliver Pitcher (44)	Ian Billcliff (141); Abdool Samad (88); Geoff Barnett (cricketer) (79)
Most wickets

The ICC Associates Triangular Series in the West Indies in 2006/07 was a three-match series involving Bangladesh, Bermuda and Canada. It was a warm-up tournament for the 2007 Cricket World Cup.

== Matches ==
=== 1st Match ===
25 February 2007
scorecard

Bermuda; 205/8 (50 overs)	v	Bangladesh; 206/2 (37.3 overs)
Lionel Cann 33 (23); Mohammad Rafique 2/38 (10 overs)		Shahriar Nafees 104* (112); Janeiro Tucker 1/20 (4.3 overs)

Bangladesh won by 8 wickets (with 75 balls remaining)
Antigua Recreation Ground, St. John's, Antigua
Umpires: Roger Dill (Ber) and Rudi Koertzen (RSA)
Player of the match: Shahriar Nafees

- Oliver Pitcher (Ber) made his ODI debut.

=== 2nd Match ===
26 February 2007
scorecard

Bermuda; 206/8 (50 overs)	v	Canada; 207/7 (44 overs)
Lionel Cann 42 (25); Umar Bhatti 4/45 (10 overs)		Abdool Samad 83 (86); Delyone Borden 4/30 (9 overs)

Canada won by 3 wickets (with 36 balls remaining)
Antigua Recreation Ground, St. John's, Antigua
Umpires: Roger Dill (Ber) and Rudi Koertzen (RSA)
Player of the match: Abdool Samad

=== 3rd Match ===
28 February 2007
scorecard

Bangladesh; 278/5 (50 overs)	v	Canada; 265/7 (50 overs)
Shakib Al Hasan 134* (152); Anderson Cummins 3/60 (10 overs)		Ian Billcliff 93 (114); Abdur Razzak 3/51 (10 overs)

Bangladesh won by 13 runs
Antigua Recreation Ground, St. John's, Antigua
Umpires: Roger Dill (Ber) and Rudi Koertzen (RSA)
Player of the match: Shakib Al Hasan

- Shakib Al Hasan (Ban) scored his first century in ODIs.
- Bangladesh won the 2006/07 Associates Tri-Series as a result.

== Standings ==
Pos	Team	M	W	L	NR	Pts	NRR
1	Bangladesh	2	2	0	0	9	+0.831
2	Canada	2	1	1	0	4	+0.181
3	Bermuda	2	0	2	0	0	-0.957

Source= ESPNCricinfo

== See also ==
Other triangular series featuring ICC associate members:

- Associates Triangular Series in Kenya in 2006–07
- Associates Triangular Series in South Africa in 2006–07
- Dubai Triangular Series 2014–15
