= Dubai Triangular Series 2014–15 =

International cricket tournament

- Date: 8–19 January 2015
- Location: United Arab Emirates
- Result: Won by Ireland
Teams
Afghanistan	Ireland	Scotland
Captains
Mohammad Nabi	William Porterfield	Preston Mommsen
Most runs
Javed Ahmadi (189)	Niall O'Brien (135)	Matt Machan (123)
Most wickets
Javed Ahmadi Aftab Alam Hamid Hassan Mirwais Ashraf (5)	Craig Young (7)	Josh Davey (6)

The Dubai Triangular Series was a One Day International cricket tournament held in the United Arab Emirates from 8 to 19 January 2015. It was a tri-nation series among Afghanistan, Ireland and Scotland as a warm-up for the 2015 Cricket World Cup. Ireland finished top of the table after the final match had to be abandoned on account of rain.

== Squads ==
Afghanistan	Ireland	Scotland
Mohammad Nabi (c); Afsar Zazai (wk); Aftab Alam; Asghar Stanikzai; Dawlat Zadran; Gulbadin Naib; Hamid Hassan; Javed Ahmadi; Mirwais Ashraf; Najibullah Zadran; Nasir Jamal; Nawroz Mangal; Samiullah Shenwari; Shapoor Zadran; Usman Ghani	William Porterfield (c); Andrew Balbirnie; Peter Chase; Alex Cusack; George Dockrell; Ed Joyce; Andrew McBrine; John Mooney; Tim Murtagh ^{1} (withdrawn); Kevin O'Brien; Niall O'Brien (wk); Max Sorensen^{1}; Paul Stirling; Stuart Thompson; Gary Wilson (wk); Craig Young	Preston Mommsen (c); Matthew Cross (wk); Kyle Coetzer; Richie Berrington; Freddie Coleman; Josh Davey; Alasdair Evans; Hamish Gardiner; Majid Haq; Michael Leask; Matt Machan; Calum MacLeod; Gavin Main; Safyaan Sharif; Rob Taylor; Iain Wardlaw

^{1} Max Sorensen replaced Tim Murtagh in the squad for the final match, and the upcoming World Cup, as Tim Murtagh broke his foot on 7 January 2015.

== Points table ==
Pos	Team	Pld	W	L	T	NR	BP	Pts	NRR
1	Ireland	4	2	1	0	1	0	5	−0.161
2	Afghanistan	4	2	2	0	0	0	4	−0.402
3	Scotland	4	1	2	0	1	0	3	+0.705

Points system

In a match declared as no result, run rate is not applicable.

Won (W): 2
Lost (L): 0
No Result (NR): 1
Tie (T): 1

- Net run rate (NRR): Runs per over scored less runs per over conceded, adjusting team batting first to overs of team batting second in rain rule matches, adjusting to team's full allocation if all out, and ignoring no result matches.

== ODI series ==
=== 1st ODI ===
8 January 2015
Scorecard

Scotland; 237/8 (45 overs)	v	Afghanistan; 240/2 (38 overs)
Hamish Gardiner 96 (105); Dawlat Zadran 3/41 (9 overs)		Javed Ahmadi 74 (81); Richie Berrington 2/38 (8 overs)

Afghanistan won by 8 wickets
ICC Academy Ground, Dubai
Umpires: Vineet Kulkarni (Ind) and Sharfuddoula (Ban)
Player of the match: Javed Ahmadi (Afg)

- Afghanistan won the toss and elected to field.
- Match reduced to 45 overs per side.

=== 2nd ODI ===
10 January 2015
Scorecard

Afghanistan; 180 (44.2 overs)	v	Ireland; 181/7 (43.2 overs)
Javed Ahmadi 81 (89); George Dockrell 4/35 (8.2 overs)		Ed Joyce 51 (67); Javed Ahmadi 4/37 (10 overs)

Ireland won by 3 wickets
Dubai International Cricket Stadium, Dubai
Umpires: Ahmed Shahab (Pak) and Vineet Kulkarni (Ind)
Player of the match: Javed Ahmadi (Afg)

- Ireland won the toss and elected to field.

=== 3rd ODI ===
12 January 2015
Scorecard

Scotland; 216/9 (50 overs)	v	Ireland; 220/7 (46.3 overs)
Matt Machan 86 (120); Craig Young 3/27 (10 overs)		Niall O'Brien 80* (106); Iain Wardlaw 3/49 (10 overs)

Ireland won by 3 wickets
Dubai International Cricket Stadium, Dubai
Umpires: Ahmed Shahab (Pak) and Sharfuddoula (Ban)
Player of the match: Niall O'Brien (Ire)

- Ireland won the toss and elected to field.

=== 4th ODI ===
14 January 2015
Scorecard

Scotland; 213/7 (50 overs)	v	Afghanistan; 63 (18.3 overs)
Richie Berrington 62 (84); Aftab Alam 3/48 (10 overs)		Usman Ghani 25 (33); Josh Davey 6/28 (8.3 overs)

Scotland won by 150 runs
Sheikh Zayed Cricket Stadium, Abu Dhabi
Umpires: Vineet Kulkarni (Ind) and Sharfuddoula (Ban)
Player of the match: Josh Davey (Sco)

- Scotland won the toss and elected to bat.
- Josh Davey's (Sco) bowling figures are the best in an ODI for Scotland.

=== 5th ODI ===
17 January 2015
Scorecard

Afghanistan; 246/8 (50 overs)	v	Ireland; 175 (43.3 overs)
Najibullah Zadran 83 (50); Craig Young 3/45 (10 overs)		Paul Stirling 36 (24); Hamid Hassan 3/24 (6.3 overs)

Afghanistan won by 71 runs
Dubai International Cricket Stadium, Dubai
Umpires: Ahmed Shahab (Pak) and Vineet Kulkarni (Ind)
Player of the match: Najibullah Zadran (Afg)

- Ireland won the toss and elected to field.

=== 6th ODI ===
19 January 2015
Scorecard

Scotland	v	Ireland

No result (abandoned with a toss)
ICC Academy Ground, Dubai
Umpires: Ahmed Shahab (Pak) and Sharfuddoula (Ban)

- Ireland won the toss and elected to field.
- The start was delayed by rain. The match was then reduced to a 20-over per side game with a toss taking place, but further rain prevented play from starting and the match was abandoned.
- Ireland won the tri-series as a result of this match.
- Peter Chase made his ODI debut.
- This was the first time that an ODI in the UAE had been a no result.

== See also ==
Three earlier triangular series featuring ICC associate members:

- Associates Triangular Series in Kenya in 2006–07
- Associates Triangular Series in South Africa in 2006–07
- Associates Triangular Series in West Indies in 2006–07
