= Andre van Troost =

Dutch cricketer (born 1972)

Personal information
- Full name: Adrianus Petrus van Troost
- Born: 2 October 1972 (age 54); Schiedam, South Holland, Netherlands
- Batting: Right-handed
- Bowling: Right-arm fast

International information
- National side: Netherlands

Domestic team information
- Years: Team
- 1991–1998: Somerset
- 1994/95: Griqualand West

Career statistics
Competition	First-class	List A
Matches	71	31
Runs scored	461	75
Batting average	7.94	8.33
100s/50s	0/0	0/0
Top score	35	17*
Balls bowled	8,451	1,321
Wickets	146	36
Bowling average	38.45	30.77
5 wickets in innings	4	1
10 wickets in match	0	0
Best bowling	6/48	5/22
Catches/stumpings	10/–	2/–
- Source: CricketArchive, 16 January 2011

Adrianus Petrus van Troost (born 2 October 1972) is a Dutch businessman and former cricketer.

A right-arm fast bowler, van Troost represented his nation at the ICC Trophy level between 1990 and 1997, taking thirteen wickets in nine matches at a bowling average of 17.38.

== Playing career ==
Van Troost played for Somerset in English county cricket and Griqualand West in South African provincial cricket.

He took 3/27 for the Netherlands in their surprise victory against the West Indies in a limited-over match in 1991, his wickets including Richie Richardson and Jeff Dujon.

Van Troost was an aggressive bowler: in 1995, whilst playing for Somerset, he bowled a bouncer to West Indies batsman Jimmy Adams, which resulted in Adams being hospitalised with a fractured cheekbone. Just a week later, umpire Barry Dudleston ordered him out of the bowling attack for intimidatory bowling in a match against Kent. On Test Match Special on 30 June 2010, Mark Butcher stated that at The Oval in around 1995 van Troost had bowled the fastest spell of bowling he had ever faced, describing the express Pakistani pace bowler Waqar Younis as looking like "a medium pace bowler by comparison".

== Later career ==
In September 2008, van Troost was appointed as the chief executive of the Royal Dutch Cricket Association but resigned less than five months later to resume his business career. His career has included working for Procter & Gamble, Danone and Lely, where he was appointed as CEO in 2020.

== Family ==
His brother Luuk van Troost has also played cricket for the Netherlands.
