= George Codrington =

Canadian cricketer (born 1966)

Personal information
- Full name: George Ricardo Codrington
- Born: 26 November 1966 (age 59); Barbados
- Batting: Right handed
- Bowling: Right arm medium fast

International information
- National side: Canada (2006–2007)
- ODI debut (cap 36): 17 May 2006 v Bermuda
- Last ODI: 18 March 2007 v England

Career statistics
Competition	ODI	FC	LA
Matches	17	2	32
Runs scored	235	89	387
Batting average	19.58	22.25	15.48
100s/50s	0/0	0/0	0/0
Top score	45*	40	45*
Balls bowled	731	276	1,281
Wickets	16	1	26
Bowling average	36.06	107.00	38.84
5 wickets in innings	0	0	0
10 wickets in match	0	0	0
Best bowling	4/33	1/20	4/33
Catches/stumpings	6/–	1/–	11/–
- Source: , 30 October 2017

George Ricardo Codrington (born 26 November 1966) is a Canadian former cricketer and former ODI captain, who played in five ODIs from 17 May 2006 to 21 August 2006.

== International career ==
On his debut, he top scored for Canada with 45 not out against Bermuda. He also appeared in the 2005 ICC Trophy in Ireland. He is a right-hand batsman and right-arm medium-fast bowler. He was made captain of the Canadian team for their matches in South Africa in late 2006 owing to the absence of usual captain John Davison.

== Domestic career ==
After captaining Barbados in an inter-island under 21 competition in the West Indies, George Codrington first travelled to England in 1986 as part of a Viv Richards scholarship with Curtly Ambrose and Samuel Skeete. All three played in the Liverpool and District Cricket Competition, Codrington with Birkenhead Park, Ambrose with Chester Boughton Hall and Skeete with Oxton. After playing at Walsden in 1987, Codrington returned to the Liverpool and District Cricket Competition in 1988 with Chester Boughton Hall.

== Coaching career ==
Codrington has taken a coaching position for the Canada Women's national cricket team.
