= Luuk van Troost =

Dutch cricketer (born 1969)

Personal information
- Full name: Lucas Petrus van Troost
- Born: 28 December 1969 (age 56); Schiedam, South Holland, Netherlands
- Batting: Left-handed
- Bowling: Left-arm medium

International information
- National side: Netherlands (2002-2007)
- ODI debut (cap 20): 16 September 2002 v Sri Lanka
- Last ODI: 18 March 2007 v Australia
- ODI shirt no.: 69

Career statistics
Competition	ODI	FC	LA
Matches	23	4	51
Runs scored	283	295	742
Batting average	15.72	49.16	20.05
100s/50s	0/0	0/2	0/3
Top score	40	86	59*
Balls bowled	246	276	984
Wickets	4	1	23
Bowling average	70.00	131.00	34.69
5 wickets in innings	0	0	0
10 wickets in match	0	0	0
Best bowling	2/29	1/28	4/28
Catches/stumpings	6/0	2/0	14/0
- Source: Cricinfo, 13 May 2017

Lucas ("Luuk") Petrus van Troost (born 28 December 1969) is a Dutch former cricketer, who captained the national team. He usually batted between no. 6 and no. 8 in the order, and when in form, scored quickly with his hard hitting. His bowling was relatively rarely called upon but provided a handy option where required.

Van Troost made his One Day International debut against Sri Lanka in September 2002 during the 2002 ICC Champions Trophy.

His brother Andre also played for the Netherlands, as well as for Somerset.
