= Craig Wright (cricketer) =

Scottish cricketer

Personal information
- Full name: Craig McIntyre Wright
- Born: 28 April 1974 (age 52); Paisley, Renfrewshire, Scotland
- Batting: Right-handed
- Bowling: Right-arm medium
- Role: Bowler

International information
- National side: Scotland
- ODI debut (cap 25): 5 August 2006 v Ireland
- Last ODI: 8 April 2009 v Canada
- ODI shirt no.: 99

Career statistics
Competition	ODI	T20I	FC	LA
Matches	20	3	16	123
Runs scored	240	14	494	1,430
Batting average	16.00	14.00	30.87	17.65
100s/50s	0/0	0/0	0/2	0/2
Top score	37	14	88*	88*
Balls bowled	861	30	2,017	5,116
Wickets	29	4	40	149
Bowling average	22.86	12.25	23.57	24.41
5 wickets in innings	0	0	0	2
10 wickets in match	0	0	0	0
Best bowling	4/29	3/29	4/38	5/23
Catches/stumpings	1/–	1/–	14/–	25/–
- Source: CricketArchive, 13 June 2009

Craig McIntyre Wright (born 28 April 1974) is a Scottish former cricketer and coach. He was a big hitting right-handed middle order batsman and right-arm medium pace bowler. He was educated at Kelvinside Academy and Glasgow Caledonian University in Glasgow.

== Career ==
Wright had represented Scotland at both Under 16 and Under 19 level before making his senior debut in a match against Ireland on 9 August 1997. He went on to play 195 times for Scotland, including the 2007 Cricket World Cup, and 20/20 World Cup in 2007 & 2009. He overtook Greig Williamson in 2006 as the highest capped Scottish player. Career highlights include a hat trick against Denmark in 2004 and a man of the match performance to help Scotland upset Worcestershire in a 1998 NatWest series match. He was also Scotland's outstanding player of their first season in the English National Cricket League in 2003 (25 wickets at an average of 19.84) and topped the tournament bowling averages (16 wickets at 13.68) in Scotland's failed bid to qualify from the ICC World Cup qualifier in 2009 .

In 2002 he was appointed captain of the national side, a role he kept until stepping down at the end of the 2007 World Cup. As captain he lifted the 2004 Intercontinental Cup and the 2005 ICC Trophy for Scotland as well as steering them to the final of the ICC World League Division 1 (which qualified the team for the 2007 20/20 World Cup). In total he captained Scotland a record 107 times.

After being omitted from the Scottish side for the 1999 World Cup despite a strong showing the previous season, he had to wait until 2006 to make his One Day International debut. In his second ODI game, against the Netherlands, he hit Tim de Leede for six off the penultimate delivery to win the game. This effort was repeated against Ireland in the 2007 World League with Wright striking a six to level scores with two balls to go before hitting the winning boundary off the final delivery. Following Scotland's removal from the 2009 ICC Twenty20 Championship, Wright, then 35, announced his retirement. At the time he was the highest wicket taker in Scottish Cricket history with 256 dismissals.

Having played the majority of his club career at West of Scotland, in April 2010 it was announced that Wright would be joining Edinburgh-based Watsonian Cricket Club after five seasons at Greenock. He captained an MCC team that toured Bermuda in September–October 2011, playing 10 one-day matches. He also served as the MCC Scotland Representative and sat on both the Players & Fixtures, and Tours Committees. He was the Associate representative on the ICC Cricket Committee from 2010-12.

Off the field he juggled his playing career with the job of Cricket Scotland's Performance Development Manager between 2007-14, having previously served as their Development Officer and Marketing Manager. He refocused his career on this role following his retirement as a player. . He coached the Scotland U19 team to two U19 World Cups (2012 & 2014). In 2014 following the departure of then Head Coach Peter Steindl, he became interim Head Coach of the Scotland National Team and led them to success in the 2014 Cricket World Cup qualifier played in New Zealand, thus becoming the first man to win the CWCQ as both a player and Head Coach. Following the appointment of Grant Bradburn as Head Coach, Wright became the National Team Assistant coach until 2016 when he left Cricket Scotland to take on the role of Head Coach of the Hong Kong Cricket Club.

Wright returned to Scotland coaching duties in 2021 as Assistant Coach to Shane Burger before departing in 2026 again to the Hong Kong Cricket Club this time in the role of General Manager.
