= John Davison (Canadian cricketer) =

Canadian cricketer (born 1970)

Personal information
- Full name: John Michael Davison
- Born: 9 May 1970 (age 56); Campbell River, British Columbia, Canada
- Nickname: Davo
- Batting: Right-handed
- Bowling: Right arm off break
- Role: All rounder

International information
- National side: Canada (2003–2011)
- ODI debut (cap 18): 11 February 2003 v Bangladesh
- Last ODI: 16 March 2011 v Australia
- ODI shirt no.: 9
- T20I debut (cap 4): 2 August 2008 v Netherlands
- Last T20I: 10 February 2010 v Kenya

Domestic team information
- Years: Team
- 1995/96–2000/01: Victoria
- 2002/03–2003/04: South Australia

Career statistics
| Competition | ODI | FC | LA |
|---|---|---|---|
| Matches | 32 | 51 | 67 |
| Runs scored | 799 | 1,177 | 1,733 |
| Batting average | 26.63 | 16.57 | 26.66 |
| 100s/50s | 1/5 | 1/4 | 3/9 |
| Top score | 111 | 165 | 131 |
| Balls bowled | 1,435 | 10,014 | 2,926 |
| Wickets | 36 | 111 | 76 |
| Bowling average | 29.63 | 45.61 | 30.56 |
| 5 wickets in innings | 0 | 5 | 1 |
| 10 wickets in match | 0 | 1 | 0 |
| Best bowling | 3/15 | 9/76 | 5/26 |
| Catches/stumpings | 12/– | 25/– | 24/– |
- Source: ESPNcricinfo, 16 March 2017

John Michael Davison (born 9 May 1970) is a Canadian-Australian cricket coach and former cricketer who has coached the Italian national cricket team since 2025. He captained the national side in One Day Internationals. He was a hard-hitting right-handed batsman in the top or middle order, and also bowled right-arm off break.

Davison retired in March 2011, playing his last game against Australia at the 2011 World Cup.

== Early life ==
Davison was born in Campbell River, British Columbia, to Australian teachers on a one-year teaching exchange. After the family returned to Australia he attended school at St Ignatius' College, Riverview, where he was a member of the 1st XI. He played grade cricket in Sydney for Gordon and Mosman and district cricket for Melbourne and attended the Australian Cricket Academy in 1993. He was a member of the Victorian state squad for several years but was unable to hold down a regular place in the team.

== International career ==
In 1999, Davison agreed to spend the Australian winters in Canada as a club player and coach. He quickly became involved with the Canadian national team, representing them in the 2001 ICC Trophy where Canada performed well to qualify for the 2003 Cricket World Cup in South Africa and Zimbabwe.

At the World Cup, Davison made an overnight name for himself, stunning the strong West Indies team with an aggressive innings of 111 (reaching 100 from 67 balls, then the quickest century in World Cup history at that time, and the first One Day International century for Canada), before making a half-century against New Zealand at the incredible strike rate of 200.

Continuing his form for Canada, Davison returned to the national line-up for the 2004 ICC Intercontinental Cup, and was named as captain. He was in inspirational form as Canada overcame rivals USA, top-scoring with 84 in Canada's first innings and taking match figures of 17 for 137 (8 for 61 and 9 for 76), the best first-class match figures anywhere in the world since Jim Laker's 19 for 90 during the 1956 Ashes.

Davison has continued to represent Canada internationally as captain of the team, and against Bermuda in 2006 he scored his only first-class century, 165 from 175 balls.

Retained as captain of Canada for the 2007 Cricket World Cup, Davison reached 50 against New Zealand from only 23 balls.

== Domestic career ==
After his successes for the modest Canadian team at the 2003 World Cup, Davison returned to Australia and continued playing for South Australia, where he had played since 2002 after being released by Victoria.

His form at international level did not help in Australia, though, as in January 2005, Davison was dropped from the South Australia state squad. He continued to play cricket in Australia at a lower level during the Australian summer. In the 2006–07 season, he played for Mosman in Sydney Grade Cricket and has recently been appointed as a development coach with the Australian Cricket Academy.

== World Cup highlights ==
- On 23 February 2003, against the West Indies, Davison scored 111 runs off 76 balls, the first 100 of which were scored off 67 balls – the fastest century in World Cup history at the time, and the fastest century by an associate player in ODI history. In his innings, he hit 6 sixes and 8 fours before eventually falling to a spectacular backwards-leaping catch at the boundary by Vasbert Drakes having attempted to score yet another six. The second-highest score for his team was just 19. He had been dropped on 50 and on 78, and more unusually, escaped when he played a ball onto the stumps without disturbing the bails. Despite his performance, Canada were convincingly beaten by the West Indies, who reached their target of 203 in just over 20 overs.
- On 3 March 2003, against New Zealand, Davison scored 75 runs off 62 balls, reaching his 50 from 25 balls. He also opened the bowling with his off-spin, and took three wickets.
- On 23 March 2007, against New Zealand, Davison reached 50 runs in 23 balls which was the third fastest fifty in World Cup history, behind only Brendon McCullum, who did it in 20 balls in the same match, and Mark Boucher, who took 21 balls six days previously. However, New Zealand went on to win the match by 114 runs.

== Coaching career ==
He was appointed to a new position as Australian spin coach for the 2013–14 Ashes series, particularly mentoring Nathan Lyon.

He currently coaches Italian national cricket team since 2025 leading them to their first victory against Nepal in their first ever World cup happening in India and Sri Lanka which they qualified through 2026 Cricket World Cup Qualifier.
