= Kenya at the Cricket World Cup =

The Kenya national cricket team is the team that represents the country of Kenya in international cricket matches. Kenya was part of the East Africa cricket team which became an associate member of the ICC in 1966, and competed in the first World Cup. Kenya first competed as an independent nation at the 1996 Cricket World Cup, after which they were given full ODI status, which they held until 2014, when they finished fifth in the 2014 Cricket World Cup Qualifier. Kenya's best performance at the Cricket World Cup was in 2003, where they reached the semi-finals.

== Cricket World Cup Record ==
Cricket World Cup record								Qualification record				
Year	Round	Position	GP	W	L	T	NR	Pld	W	L	T	NR
(England) 1975	Part of East Africa team							No qualifiers held				
(England) 1979	Part of East Africa team							Participated as part of East African team				
(England) 1983	Part of East Africa team							Participated as part of East African team				
(India) (Pakistan) 1987	Part of East Africa team							Participated as part of East African team				
(Australia) (New Zealand) 1992	Did not qualify							7	2	5	0	0
(India) (Pakistan) (Sri Lanka) 1996	Group Stage	10/12	5	1	4	0	0	9	8	1	0	0
(England) (Scotland) (Republic of Ireland) (Netherlands) 1999	Group Stage	11/12	5	0	5	0	0	10	8	1	0	1
(South Africa) (Zimbabwe) (Kenya) 2003	Semi-final	4/14	10	5 (Note: Includes Walkover against New Zealand)	5	0	0	Did not participate (qualified automatically)				
(Cricket West Indies) 2007	Group Stage	11/16	3	1	2	0	0	Did not participate (qualified automatically)				
(India) (Bangladesh) (Sri Lanka) 2011	Group Stage	14/14	6	0	6	0	0	10	6	4	0	0
(Australia) (New Zealand) 2015	Did not qualify							23	8	15	0	0
(England) 2019	Did not qualify							26	9	17	0	0
(India) 2023	Did not qualify							15	7	7	0	1
Total	0 titles	5/13	29	7	22	0	0	100	48	50	0	2

=== World Cup Record (By Team) ===
Cricket World Cup matches (By team)
Total: 7 Wins – 0 Ties – 22 Losses – 29 games played
Against	Total	Wins	Draws	Losses
Australia	3	0	0	3
Bangladesh	1	1	0	0
Canada	3	2	0	1
England	2	0	0	2
India	4	0	0	4
New Zealand	3	1	0	2
Pakistan	1	0	0	1
South Africa	2	0	0	2
Sri Lanka	4	1	0	3
(Cricket West Indies) West Indies	2	1	0	1
Zimbabwe	4	1	0	3
Source: Last Updated: 18 March 2015

== Tournament results ==
=== 1996 World Cup ===
1996 was Kenya's debut at the Cricket World Cup, and they were drawn against co-hosts Sri Lanka, and also Australia, India, West Indies and Zimbabwe. Kenya beat the West Indies, but lost their other 4 games, and were eliminated after the group stages.

Squad

- Maurice Odumbe (c)
- Aasif Karim (vc)
- Dipak Chudasama
- David Tikolo
- Steve Tikolo
- Thomas Odoyo
- Martin Suji
- Lameck Onyango
- Kennedy Otieno (wk)
- Hitesh Modi
- Brijal Patel
- Edward Odumbe
- Tariq Iqbal (wk)
- Rajab Ali

Results

Group stage (Group A)						Semifinal	Final	Overall Result
Opposition Result	Opposition Result	Opposition Result	Opposition Result	Opposition Result	Rank	Opposition Result	Opposition Result	Overall Result
India; L by 7 wickets	Australia; L by 97 runs	Zimbabwe; L by 5 wickets	West Indies; W by 73 runs	Sri Lanka; L by 144 runs	6	Did not advance		Group stage

Scorecards

Group stage (Group A)

18 February
Scorecard

Kenya; 199/6 (50 overs)	v	India; 203/3 (41.5 overs)
Steve Tikolo 65 (83); Anil Kumble 3/28 (10 overs)		Sachin Tendulkar 127* (138); Steve Tikolo 1/26 (3 overs)

India won by 7 wickets
Barabati Stadium, Cuttack
Umpires: K. T. Francis and David Shepherd
Player of the match: Sachin Tendulkar (Ind)

23 February
Scorecard

Australia; 304/7 (50 overs)	v	Kenya; 207/7 (50 overs)
Mark Waugh 130 (128); Rajab Ali 3/45 (10 overs)		Kennedy Otieno 85 (137); Paul Reiffel 2/18 (7 overs)

Australia won by 97 runs
Indira Priyadarshini Stadium, Visakhapatnam
Umpires: Cyril Mitchley and David Shepherd
Player of the match: Mark Waugh (Aus)

26 February
Scorecard

Kenya; 134 (49.4 overs)	v	Zimbabwe; 137/5 (42.2 overs)
Dipak Chudasama 34 (66); Paul Strang 5/21 (9.4 overs)		Grant Flower 45 (112); Rajab Ali 3/22 (8 overs)

Zimbabwe won by 5 wickets
Moin-ul-Haq Stadium, Patna
Umpires: Khizer Hayat and Cyril Mitchley
Player of the match: Paul Strang (Zim)

- This game was scheduled to be played on 25 February. That game started but was abandoned after 15.5 overs in the Zimbabwe innings.

29 February
Scorecard

Kenya; 166 (49.3 overs)	v	West Indies; 93 (35.2 overs)
Steve Tikolo 29 (50); Courtney Walsh 3/46 (9 overs)		Shivnarine Chanderpaul 19 (48); Maurice Odumbe 3/15 (10 overs)

Kenya won by 73 runs
Nehru Stadium, Pune
Umpires: Khizer Hayat and V.K. Ramaswamy
Player of the match: Maurice Odumbe (Ken)

6 March
Scorecard

Sri Lanka; 398/5 (50 overs)	v	Kenya; 254/7 (50 overs)
Aravinda De Silva 145 (115); Tito Odumbe 2/34 (5 overs)		Steve Tikolo 96 (95); Arjuna Ranatunga 2/31 (5 overs)

Sri Lanka won by 144 runs
Asgiriya Stadium, Kandy
Umpires: Steve Dunne and V.K. Ramaswamy
Player of the match: Aravinda De Silva (SL)

- Sri Lanka's total of 398/5 surpassed England's 363/7 against Pakistan in 1992 as the highest score in all ODIs. The record stood until 12 March 2006, when both Australia and South Africa broke it in the same match. It remained a World Cup record until the 2007 tournament, when India scored 413/5 against Bermuda.

=== 1999 World Cup ===
In the 1999 World Cup itself, they were placed in the same first round group as hosts England, and India, South Africa, Sri Lanka and Zimbabwe. They lost all five of their games in the tournament.

Squad

- Aasif Karim (c)
- Ravindu Shah
- Steve Tikolo
- Thomas Odoyo
- Maurice Odumbe
- Hitesh Modi
- Kennedy Otieno (wk)
- Mohammad Sheikh
- Martin Suji
- Tony Suji
- Sandip Gupta
- Joseph Angara
- Dipak Chudasama
- Alpesh Vadher
- Jimmy Kamande

Results

Pool stage (Pool A)						Super Sixes		Semifinal	Final	Overall Result
Opposition Result	Opposition Result	Opposition Result	Opposition Result	Opposition Result	Rank	Opposition Result	Rank	Opposition Result	Opposition Result	Overall Result
Zimbabwe; L by 5 wickets	England; L by 9 wickets	India; L by 94 runs	South Africa; L by 7 wickets	Sri Lanka; L by 45 runs	6	Did not advance				Pool stage

Scorecards

Pool stage (Pool A)

15 May 1999
Scorecard

Kenya; 229/7 (50 overs)	v	Zimbabwe; 231/5 (41 overs)
Alpesh Vadher 54 (90); Neil Johnson 4/42 (10 overs)		Neil Johnson 59 (70); Maurice Odumbe 2/39 (7 overs)

Zimbabwe won by 5 wickets
County Ground, Taunton, England
Umpires: Doug Cowie (NZ) and Javed Akhtar (Pak)
Player of the match: Neil Johnson (Zim)

18 May 1999
Scorecard

Kenya; 203 (49.4 overs)	v	England; 204/1 (39 overs)
Steve Tikolo 71 (141); Darren Gough 4/34 (10 overs)		Nasser Hussain 88* (127); Thomas Odoyo 1/65 (10 overs)

England won by 9 wickets
St Lawrence Ground, Canterbury, England
Umpires: KT Francis (SL) and Rudi Koertzen (SA)
Player of the match: Steve Tikolo (Ken)

23 May 1999
Scorecard

India; 329/2 (50 overs)	v	Kenya; 235/7 (50 overs)
Sachin Tendulkar 140 (101); Martin Suji 1/26 (10 overs)		Steve Tikolo 58 (75); Debashish Mohanty 4/56 (10 overs)

India won by 94 runs
County Ground, Bristol, England
Umpires: Doug Cowie (NZ) and Ian Robinson (Zim)
Player of the match: Sachin Tendulkar (Ind)

26 May 1999
Scorecard

Kenya; 152 (44.3 overs)	v	South Africa; 153/3 (41 overs)
Ravindu Shah 50 (64); Lance Klusener 5/21 (8.3 overs)		Jacques Kallis 44* (81); Maurice Odumbe 1/15 (7 overs)

South Africa won by 7 wickets
VRA Ground, Amstelveen, Netherlands
Umpires: Doug Cowie (NZ) and Peter Willey (Eng)
Player of the match: Lance Klusener (SA)

30 May 1999
Scorecard

Sri Lanka; 275/8 (50 overs)	v	Kenya; 230/6 (50 overs)
Marvan Atapattu 52 (67); Thomas Odoyo 3/56 (10 overs)		Maurice Odumbe 82 (95); Chaminda Vaas 2/26 (7 overs)

Sri Lanka won by 45 runs
County Ground, Southampton, England
Umpires: Dave Orchard (SA) and Peter Willey (Eng)
Player of the match: Maurice Odumbe (Ken)

=== 2003 World Cup ===
The 2003 Cricket World Cup was to be Kenya's finest moment in international cricket to date. The tournament was to be held in South Africa, with Kenya hosting their two matches against Sri Lanka and New Zealand.

The tournament started with a defeat to South Africa, but Kenya bounced back with a four wicket win over Canada in Cape Town. New Zealand forfeited their match against Kenya in Nairobi due to safety concerns, but Sri Lanka did visit Nairobi and lost by 53 runs. The tournament continued, back in South Africa, with a win over Bangladesh and a defeat to the West Indies. Kenya had done enough to qualify for the Super Six stage, becoming the first non-test nation to progress beyond the first round of the World Cup.

In the Super Six stage, they lost to India and Australia, but beat Zimbabwe by seven wickets, qualifying for the semi-final.

The fairytale ended for the Kenyan team, the only non-Test-playing nation to ever make a World Cup semi-final. Sachin Tendulkar (83 from 101 balls, 5 fours, 1 six) and Sourav Ganguly (111 from 114 balls, 5 fours, 5 sixes), batted the Kenyans out of the game as India careered to a total of 270 (4 wickets, 50 overs). Under the Durban lights, the potent Indian seam attack of Zaheer Khan (3/14 in 9.2 overs), the experienced Javagal Srinath (1/11 in 7 overs) and Ashish Nehra (2/11 in 5 overs) careered through the Kenyan top order. Kenya were bowled out for 179 (all out, 46.2 overs), with only Steve Tikolo (56 from 83 balls, 5 fours, 2 sixes) putting up any significant resistance.

Squad

- Steve Tikolo (c)
- Ravindu Shah
- Kennedy Otieno (wk)
- David Obuya (wk)
- Collins Obuya
- Maurice Odumbe
- Thomas Odoyo
- Hitesh Modi
- Tony Suji
- Martin Suji
- Peter Ongondo
- Brijal Patel
- Joseph Angara
- Aasif Karim
- Alpesh Vadher

Results

Pool stage (Pool B)							Super Sixes				Semifinal	Final	Overall Result
Opposition Result	Opposition Result	Opposition Result	Opposition Result	Opposition Result	Opposition Result	Rank	Opposition Result	Opposition Result	Opposition Result	Rank	Opposition Result	Opposition Result	Overall Result
South Africa; L by 10 wickets	Canada; W by 4 wickets	New Zealand; W by walkover	Sri Lanka; W by 53 runs	Bangladesh; W by 32 runs	West Indies; L by 142 runs	2	India; L by 6 wickets	Zimbabwe; W by 7 wickets	Australia; L by 5 wickets	3	India; L by 91 runs	Did not advance	Semi-finals

Scorecards

Pool stage (Pool B)

12 February
Scorecard

Kenya; 140 (38 overs)	v	South Africa; 142/0 (21.2 overs)
Ravi Shah 60 (87); Lance Klusener 4/16 (8 overs)		Herschelle Gibbs 87* (66)

South Africa won by 10 wickets
North West Cricket Stadium, Potchefstroom, South Africa
Umpires: Kevan Barbour and Tyron Wijewardene
Player of the match: Lance Klusener (South Africa)

- Kenya won the toss and chose to bat.

15 February
Scorecard

Canada; 197 (49 overs)	v	Kenya; 198/6 (48.3 overs)
Ian Billcliff 71 (100); Thomas Odoyo 4/28 (10 overs)		Ravi Shah 61 (95); John Davison 3/15 (10 overs)

Kenya won by 4 wickets.
Newlands, Cape Town, South Africa
Umpires: Arani Jayaprakash and Nadeem Ghauri
Player of the match: Thomas Odoyo (Ken)

- Canada won the toss and chose to bat.

21 February
Scorecard

Kenya	v	New Zealand

Kenya won by walkover.
Gymkhana Club Ground, Nairobi, Kenya

- New Zealand forfeited the match due to safety concerns

24 February
Scorecard

Kenya; 210/9 (50 overs)	v	Sri Lanka; 157 (49 overs)
Kennedy Otieno 60 (88); Muttiah Muralitharan 4/28 (10 overs)		Aravinda de Silva 41 (53); Collins Obuya 5/24 (10 overs)

Kenya won by 57 runs.
Gymkhana Club Ground, Nairobi, Kenya
Umpires: Daryl Harper and Russell Tiffin
Player of the match: Collins Obuya (Ken)

- Sri Lanka won the toss and chose to field.

1 March
Scorecard

Kenya; 217/7 (50 overs)	v	Bangladesh; 185 (47.2 overs)
Maurice Odumbe 52 (46); Sanwar Hossain 3/49 (10 overs)		Tushar Imran 48 (81); Maurice Odumbe 4/38 (10 overs)

Kenya won by 32 runs.
New Wanderers Stadium, Johannesburg, South Africa
Umpires: Asoka de Silva and Neil Mallender
Player of the match: Maurice Odumbe (Ken)

- Kenya won the toss and chose to bat.

4 March
Scorecard

West Indies; 246/7 (50 overs)	v	Kenya; 104 (35.5 overs)
Chris Gayle 119 (151); Joseph Angara 2/53 (7 overs)		Peter Ongondo 24 (43); Vasbert Drakes 5/33 (10 overs)

West Indies won by 142 runs.
De Beers Diamond Oval, Kimberley, South Africa
Umpires: David Shepherd and Simon Taufel
Player of the match: Vasbert Drakes (WI)

- West Indies won the toss and chose to bat.

Super sixes

7 March
Scorecard

Kenya; 225/6 (50 overs)	v	India; 226/4 (47.5 overs)
Kennedy Otieno 79 (134); Javagal Srinath 2/43 (10 overs)		Sourav Ganguly 107 (120); Thomas Odoyo 2/27 (7 overs)

India won by 6 wickets.
Newlands, Cape Town, South Africa
Umpires: Daryl Harper and Peter Willey
Player of the match: Sourav Ganguly (Ind)

- Kenya won the toss and chose to bat.

12 March
Scorecard

Zimbabwe; 133 (44.1 overs)	v	Kenya; 135/3 (26 overs)
Andy Flower 63 (101); Martin Suji 3/19 (8 overs)		Thomas Odoyo 43 (60); Henry Olonga 2/21 (4 overs)

Kenya won by 7 wickets.
Goodyear Park, Bloemfontein, South Africa
Umpires: Aleem Dar and Srinivas Venkataraghavan
Player of the match: Martin Suji (Ken)

- Zimbabwe won the toss and chose to bat.

15 March
Scorecard

Kenya; 174/8 (50 overs)	v	Australia; 178/5 (31.2 overs)
Steve Tikolo 51 (100); Brett Lee 3/14 (8 overs)		Adam Gilchrist 67 (43); Aasif Karim 3/7 (8.3 overs)

Australia won by 5 wickets.
Kingsmead, Durban, South Africa
Umpires: Billy Bowden and Steve Bucknor
Player of the match: Aasif Karim (Ken)

- Australia won the toss and chose to field.

Knockout stage

Semi-final 2
20 March
Scorecard

India; 270/4 (50 overs)	v	Kenya; 179 (46.2 overs)
Sourav Ganguly 111* (114); Peter Ongondo 1/38 (10 overs)		Steve Tikolo 56 (83); Zaheer Khan 3/14 (9.2 overs)

India won by 91 runs
Sahara Stadium Kingsmead, Durban, South Africa
Umpires: SA Bucknor (WIN) and DJ Harper (AUS)
Player of the match: Sourav Ganguly

=== 2007 World Cup ===
Kenya hosted Division One of the World Cricket League at three grounds in Nairobi, playing against Bermuda, Canada, Ireland, the Netherlands and Scotland. Kenya also won this event, beating Scotland in the final. This was followed by the 2007 World Cup, Kenya's fourth World Cup. Kenya beat Canada in the first round, but lost to England and New Zealand, thus missing out on the Super Eight stage.

Squad

- Steve Tikolo (c)
- Thomas Odoyo (vc)
- Ravindu Shah
- Tanmay Mishra
- Collins Obuya
- David Obuya (wk)
- Morris Ouma (wk)
- Peter Ongondo
- Nehemiah Odhiambo
- Malhar Patel
- Hiren Varaiya
- Rajesh Bhudia
- Jimmy Kamande
- Tony Suji
- Lameck Onyango

Results

Group stage (Group C)				Super 8		Semifinal	Final	Overall Result
Opposition Result	Opposition Result	Opposition Result	Rank	Opposition Result	Rank	Opposition Result	Opposition Result	Overall Result
Canada; W by 7 wickets	New Zealand; L by 148 runs	England; L by 7 wickets	3	Did not advance				Group stage

Scorecards

Group stage (Group C)

14 March
Scorecard

Canada; 199 (50 overs)	v	Kenya; 203/3 (43.2 overs)
Geoff Barnett 41 (50); Jimmy Kamande 2/25 (10 overs)		Steve Tikolo 72* (76); Anderson Cummins 1/32 (8 overs)

Kenya won by seven wickets.
Beausejour Stadium, Gros Islet, Saint Lucia
Umpires: Asad Rauf and P. D. Parker
Player of the match: Steve Tikolo (Ken)

20 March
Scorecard

New Zealand; 331/7 (50 overs)	v	Kenya; 183 (49.2 overs)
Ross Taylor 85 (107); Thomas Odoyo 2/55 (10 overs)		Ravindu Shah 71 (89); James Franklin 2/20 (7.2 overs)

New Zealand won by 148 runs.
Beausejour Stadium, Gros Islet, Saint Lucia
Umpires: Billy Doctrove and Rudi Koertzen
Player of the match: Ross Taylor (NZ)

24 March
Scorecard

Kenya; 177 (43 overs)	v	England; 178/3 (33 overs)
Steve Tikolo 76 (97); James Anderson (cricketer) 2/27 (9 overs)		Ed Joyce 75 (90); Ed Joyce 1/27 (6 overs)

England won by seven wickets.
Beausejour Stadium, Gros Islet, Saint Lucia
Umpires: Rudi Koertzen and Peter Parker
Player of the match: Ed Joyce (Eng)

=== 2011 World Cup ===
Kenya qualified for the 2011 Cricket World Cup, but failed to win a single match, being eliminated in the group stages.

Squad

- Jimmy Kamande (c)
- Steve Tikolo
- Collins Obuya
- David Obuya
- Morris Ouma (wk)
- Tanmay Mishra
- Alex Obanda
- Seren Waters
- Rakep Patel
- Thomas Odoyo
- Peter Ongondo
- Nehemiah Odhiambo
- Elijah Otieno
- Shem Ngoche
- James Ngoche

Results

Group stage (Group A)							Quarterfinal	Semifinal	Final	Overall Result
Opposition Result	Opposition Result	Opposition Result	Opposition Result	Opposition Result	Opposition Result	Rank	Opposition Result	Opposition Result	Opposition Result	Overall Result
New Zealand; L by 10 wickets	Pakistan; L by 205 runs	Sri Lanka; L by 9 wickets	Canada; L by 5 wickets	Australia; L by 60 runs	Zimbabwe; L by 161 runs	7	Did not advance			Group stage

Scorecards

Group stage (Group A)

20 February 2011
09:30
Scorecard

Kenya; 69 (23.5 overs)	v	New Zealand; 72/0 (8 overs)
Rakep Patel 16* (23); Hamish Bennett 4/16 (5 overs)		Martin Guptill 39* (32)

New Zealand won by 10 wickets
MA Chidambaram Stadium, Chepauk, Chennai
Umpires: Marais Erasmus (SA) and Rod Tucker (Aus)
Player of the match: Hamish Bennett (NZ)

- Kenya won the toss and elected to bat.

23 February 2011
14:30 (D/N)
Scorecard

Pakistan; 317/7 (50 overs)	v	Kenya; 112 (33.1 overs)
Umar Akmal 71 (52); Thomas Odoyo 3/41 (7 overs)		Collins Obuya 47 (58); Shahid Afridi 5/16 (8 overs)

Pakistan won by 205 runs
Mahinda Rajapaksa International Stadium, Hambantota
Umpires: Tony Hill (NZ) and Nigel Llong (Eng)
Player of the match: Umar Akmal (Pak)

- Pakistan won the toss and elected to bat.

1 March 2011
14:30 (D/N)
Scorecard

Kenya; 142 (43.4 overs)	v	Sri Lanka; 146/1 (18.4 overs)
Collins Obuya 42 (100); Lasith Malinga 6/38 (7.4 overs)		Upul Tharanga 67* (59); Elijah Otieno 1/26 (4 overs)

Sri Lanka won by 9 wickets
R Premadasa Stadium, Colombo
Umpires: Tony Hill (NZ) and Shavir Tarapore (Ind)
Player of the match: Lasith Malinga (SL)

- Kenya won the toss and elected to bat.

7 March 2011
14:30 (D/N)
Scorecard

Kenya; 198 (50 overs)	v	Canada; 199/5 (45.3 overs)
Thomas Odoyo 51 (62); Henry Osinde 4/26 (10 overs)		Jimmy Hansra 70 (99); Nehemiah Odhiambo 2/45 (10 overs)

Canada won by 5 wickets
Feroz Shah Kotla, New Delhi
Umpires: Asad Rauf (Pak) and Billy Doctrove (WI)
Player of the match: Henry Osinde (Can)

- Kenya won the toss and elected to bat.

13 March 2011
14:30 (D/N)
Scorecard

Australia; 324/6 (50 overs)	v	Kenya; 264/6 (50 overs)
Michael Clarke 93 (80); Nehemiah Odhiambo 3/57 (10 overs)		Collins Obuya 98* (129); Shaun Tait 2/49 (8 overs)

Australia won by 60 runs
M Chinnaswamy Stadium, Bangalore
Umpires: Asad Rauf (Pak) and Richard Kettleborough (Eng)
Player of the match: Collins Obuya (Ken)

- Australia won the toss and elected to bat.

20 March 2011
09:30
Scorecard

Zimbabwe; 308/6 (50 overs)	v	Kenya; 147 (36 overs)
Craig Ervine 66 (54); Elijah Otieno 2/61 (10 overs)		Nehemiah Odhiambo 44* (47); Ray Price 2/20 (7 overs)

Zimbabwe won by 161 runs
Eden Gardens, Kolkata
Umpires: Asoka de Silva (SL) and Kumar Dharmasena (SL)
Player of the match: Craig Ervine (Zim)

- Zimbabwe won the toss and elected to bat.

== Records and statistics ==
=== Team records ===
Highest innings totals

Score	Opponent	Venue	Season
264/4 (50 overs)	Australia	Bengaluru	2011
2547 (50 overs)	Sri Lanka	Asgiriya, Kandy	1996
235/7 (50 overs)	India	Bristol	1999
230/6 (50 overs)	Sri Lanka	County Ground, Southampton	1999
229/7 (50 overs)	Zimbabwe	Taunton	1999
Last updated: 20 March 2011

Lowest completed innings

Score	Opponent	Venue	Season
69 (23.5 overs)	New Zealand	Chennai	2011
104 (35.5 overs)	West Indies	Kimberley	2003
112 (33.1 overs)	Pakistan	Hambantota	2011
134 (49.4 overs)	Zimbabwe	Patna	1996
140 (38 overs)	South Africa	Potchefstroom	2003
(unfinished innings excluded from this list) Last updated: 20 March 2011

=== Most appearances ===
This list consists players with most number of matches at the Cricket World Cup. Steve Tikolo have played the most matches, having appeared in 28 World Cup games and he also captained the team in 13 matches — the highest by a Kenyan captain.

Matches	Player	Period
28	Steve Tikolo	1996-2011
25	Thomas Odoyo	1996-2011
20	Kennedy Otieno	1996-2003
20	Martin Suji	1996-2003
19	Maurice Odumbe	1996-2003
Last updated: 20 March 2011

=== Batting records ===
Most runs

Runs	Player	Mat	Inn	Avg	100s	50s	Period
768	Steve Tikolo	28	27	29.53	—	8	1996–2011
500	Ravindu Shah	17	17	29.41	—	4	1999–2007
463	Thomas Odoyo	25	23	24.36	—	1	1996–2011
452	Maurice Odumbe	19	18	30.13	—	3	1996–2003
427	Kennedy Otieno	20	19	22.47	—	4	1996–2003
Last updated: 20 March 2011

Highest individual innings

Score	Player	Opponent	Venue	Season
98*	Collins Obuya	Australia	Bengaluru	2011
96	Steve Tikolo	Sri Lanka	Asgiriya, Kandy	1996
85	Kennedy Otieno	Australia	Visakhapatnam	1996
82	Maurice Odumbe	Sri Lanka	County Ground, Southampton	1999
79	Kennedy Otieno	India	Cape Town	2003
Last updated: 20 March 2011

Highest partnerships

Runs	Players	Opposition	Venue	Season
161 (6th wicket)	Alpesh Vadher (70) & Maurice Odumbe (75)	v Sri Lanka	County Ground, Southampton	1999
137 (4th wicket)	Steve Tikolo & Hitesh Modi	v Sri Lanka	Asgiriya, Kandy	1996
118 (3rd wicket)	Steve Tikolo (51) & Kennedy Otieno (40)	v India	Bristol	1999
115 (4th wicket)	Collins Obuya (37) & Tanmay Mishra (72)	v Australia	Bengaluru	2011
102 (3rd wicket)	Kennedy Otieno & Maurice Odumbe	v Australia	Visakhapatnam	1996
Last updated: 20 March 2011

=== Bowling statistics ===
Most wickets

Wickets	Player	Matches	Avg.	Econ.	4W	5W	Period
23	Thomas Odoyo	25	35.52	4.83	1	0	1996–2011
18	Maurice Odumbe	19	31.50	4.85	1	0	1996–2003
15	Steve Tikolo	28	34.13	5.36	0	0	1996–2011
14	Collins Obuya	18	33.00	4.99	0	1	2003–2011
14	Martin Suji	20	49.71	4.50	0	0	1996–2003
10	Rajab Ali	6	19.00	4.59	0	0	1996–1996
Last updated: 20 March 2011

Best bowling figures

Bowling Figures	Overs	Player	Opponent	Venue	Season
5/24	10.0	Collins Obuya	v Sri Lanka	Nairobi	2003
4/28	10.0	Thomas Odoyo	v Canada	Cape Town	2003
4/38	10.0	Maurice Odumbe	v Bangladesh	Johannesburg	2003
3/7	8.2	Aasif Karim	v Australia	Durban	2003
3/14	5.2	Steve Tikolo	v Bangladesh	Johannesburg	2003
Last updated: 20 March 2011

== See also ==
- Kenya national cricket team
- Cricket in Kenya
