= 1999 Cricket World Cup squads =

List of final 15-man squads

This is a list of the final 15-man squads named for the 1999 Cricket World Cup in England which took place from 14 May 1999 to 20 June 1999, in order of the jersey number worn. Each team had to number the players from 1 to 15, with captains usually wearing the number 1 jersey. The oldest player at the 1999 Cricket World Cup was Ian Philip (40) of Scotland while the youngest player was Mohammad Sheikh (18) of Kenya.

== Australia ==
Coach: Geoff Marsh

No.	Player	Date of birth	Matches	Batting style	Bowling style	First-class team
1	Steve Waugh (c)	2 June 1965	258	Right-handed	Right-arm medium	New South Wales
2	Michael Bevan	8 May 1970	104	Left-handed	Slow left-arm wrist-spin	New South Wales
3	Damien Fleming	24 April 1970	51	Right-handed	Right-arm fast-medium	Victoria
4	Paul Reiffel	19 April 1966	86	Right-handed	Right-arm fast-medium	Victoria
5	Shane Warne	13 September 1969	115	Right-handed	Right-arm leg break	Victoria
6	Mark Waugh	2 June 1965	181	Right-handed	Right-arm medium, off-break	New South Wales
7	Shane Lee	8 August 1973	23	Right-handed	Right-arm medium	New South Wales
8	Brendon Julian	10 August 1970	23	Right-handed	Left-arm fast-medium	Western Australia
9	Tom Moody	2 October 1965	63	Right-handed	Right-arm medium	Western Australia
10	Darren Lehmann	5 February 1970	45	Left-handed	Slow left-arm orthodox	South Australia
11	Glenn McGrath	9 February 1970	86	Right-handed	Right-arm fast-medium	New South Wales
12	Adam Gilchrist (wk)	14 November 1971	58	Left-handed	Right-arm off break	Western Australia
13	Adam Dale	30 December 1968	24	Left-handed	Right-arm medium	Queensland
14	Ricky Ponting	19 December 1974	73	Right-handed	Right-arm medium	Tasmania
15	Damien Martyn	21 October 1971	33	Right-handed	Right-arm medium	Western Australia

== Bangladesh ==
Coach:Gordon Greenidge

No.	Player	Date of birth	Matches	Batting style	Bowling style	First-class team
1	Aminul Islam (c)	2 February 1968	26	Right-handed	Right-arm offbreak	Biman Bangladesh Airlines
2	Akram Khan	1 November 1968	26	Right-handed	Right-arm medium	Chittagong Division
3	Faruk Ahmed	24 July 1966	5	Right-handed	Right-arm offbreak	Biman Bangladesh Airlines
4	Shahriar Hossain	1 June 1976	10	Right-handed	Right-arm offbreak	Dhaka Division
5	Mehrab Hossain	22 September 1978	5	Right-handed	Right-arm medium	Dhaka Division
6	Enamul Haque	27 February 1966	16	Left-handed	Slow left-arm orthodox	Biman Bangladesh Airlines
7	Niamur Rashid	1 January 1975	1	Right-handed	Right-arm medium-fast	Dhaka Metropolis
8	Naimur Rahman	9 September 1974	11	Right-handed	Right-arm offbreak	Dhaka Division
9	Khaled Mahmud	26 July 1971	11	Right-handed	Right-arm medium	Dhaka Division
10	Khaled Mashud (wk)	8 February 1976	20	Right-handed	Wicket-keeper	Rajshahi Division
11	Mohammad Rafique	5 September 1970	16	Left-handed	Slow left-arm orthodox	Sylhet Division
12	Shafiuddin Ahmed	1 June 1973	8	Right-handed	Right-arm fast-medium	Chittagong Division
13	Hasibul Hossain	3 June 1977	20	Right-handed	Right-arm fast-medium	Sylhet Division
14	Manjural Islam	7 November 1979	1	Left-handed	Left–arm fast–medium	Khulna Division
15	Minhajul Abedin	25 September 1965	23	Right-handed	Right-arm offbreak	Chittagong Division

== England ==
Coach: David Lloyd

No.	Player	Date of birth	Matches	Batting style	Bowling style	First-class team
1	Alec Stewart (c/wk)	8 April 1963	120	Right-handed	Right-arm medium	Surrey
2	Ian Austin	30 May 1966	7	Left-handed	Right-arm medium	Lancashire
3	Robert Croft	25 May 1970	42	Right-handed	Right-arm offbreak	Glamorgan
4	Mark Ealham	27 August 1969	34	Right-handed	Right-arm medium-fast	Kent
5	Neil Fairbrother	9 September 1963	70	Left-handed	Left-arm medium	Lancashire
6	Andrew Flintoff	6 December 1977	4	Right-handed	Right-arm fast	Lancashire
7	Angus Fraser	8 August 1965	39	Right-handed	Right-arm fast-medium	Middlesex
8	Darren Gough	18 September 1970	60	Right-handed	Right-arm fast	Yorkshire
9	Graeme Hick	23 May 1966	91	Right-handed	Right-arm off-break	Worcestershire
10	Adam Hollioake	5 September 1971	32	Right-handed	Right-arm medium	Surrey
11	Nasser Hussain	28 March 1968	28	Right-handed	Right-arm leg break	Essex
12	Nick Knight	28 November 1969	44	Left-handed	Right-arm medium	Warwickshire
13	Alan Mullally	12 July 1969	24	Right-handed	Left-arm fast medium	Leicestershire
14	Graham Thorpe	1 August 1969	48	Left-handed	Right-arm medium	Surrey
15	Vince Wells	6 August 1965	9	Right-handed	Right-arm medium	Kent

== India ==
Coach: Anshuman Gaekwad

No.	Player	Date of birth	Matches	Batting style	Bowling style	First-class team
1	Mohammad Azharuddin (c)	8 February 1963	315	Right-handed	Right-arm medium	Hyderabad
2	Sourav Ganguly	8 July 1972	99	Left-handed	Right-arm medium	Bengal
3	Ajay Jadeja (vc)	1 February 1971	164	Right-handed	Right-arm medium	Haryana
4	Sadagoppan Ramesh	16 October 1975	7	Left-handed	Right-arm offbreak	Tamil Nadu
5	Rahul Dravid	11 January 1973	80	Right-handed	Right-arm off spin	Karnataka
6	Robin Singh	14 September 1963	80	Left-handed	Right-arm medium-fast	Tamil Nadu
7	Ajit Agarkar	4 December 1977	36	Right-handed	Right-arm fast-medium	Mumbai
8.	Anil Kumble	17 October 1970	167	Right-handed	Right-arm leg spin	Karnataka
9	Nayan Mongia (wk)	19 December 1969	132	Right-handed	Wicket-keeper	Baroda
10	Sachin Tendulkar	24 April 1973	211	Right-handed	Right-arm spin	Mumbai
11	Venkatesh Prasad	5 August 1969	111	Right-handed	Right-arm medium-fast	Karnataka
12	Nikhil Chopra	19 August 1973	14	Right-handed	Right-arm offbreak	Uttar Pradesh
13	Debasis Mohanty	20 July 1976	20	Right-handed	Right-arm fast-medium	Odisha
14	Javagal Srinath	31 August 1969	161	Right-handed	Right-arm fast	Karnataka
15	Amay Khurasiya	18 May 1972	4	Left-handed	Slow Left-arm	Madhya Pradesh

== Kenya ==
No.	Player	Date of birth	Matches	Batting style	Bowling style	First-class team
1	Aasif Karim (c)	15 September 1963	25	Right-handed	Slow left-arm orthodox	Jaffery, Mombasa
2	Maurice Odumbe	15 June 1969	25	Right-handed	Right-arm offbreak	Aga Khan, Nairobi
3	Ravindu Shah	28 August 1972	8	Right-handed	Right-arm medium-fast	Nairobi Gymkhana, Kisumu
4	Kennedy Otieno (wk)	11 March 1972	25	Right-handed	–	Ruaraka, Nairobi
5	Steve Tikolo	25 June 1971	25	Right-handed	Right-arm medium, off spin	Swamibapa, Nairobi
6	Hitesh Modi	13 October 1971	25	Left-handed	Slow left-arm orthodox	Nairobi Gymkhana, Kisumu
7	Sandip Gupta (wk)	7 April 1967	7	Right-handed	–	
8	Thomas Odoyo	12 May 1978	24	Right-handed	Right-arm medium-fast	Nairobi Gymkhana, Kisumu
9	Tony Suji	5 February 1976	13	Right-handed	Right-arm medium	Aga Khan, Nairobi
10	Martin Suji	2 June 1971	23	Right-handed	Right-arm medium-fast	Aga Khan, Nairobi
11	Mohammad Sheikh	29 August 1980	15	Left-handed	Left-arm fast	
12	Joseph Angara	8 November 1971	4	Right-handed	Right-arm medium-fast	Swamibapa, Nairobi
13	Dipak Chudasama	20 May 1963	19	Right-handed	–	
14	Alpesh Vadher	7 September 1974	11	Right-handed	–	Premier, Nairobi
15	Jimmy Kamande	12 December 1978	0	Right-handed	Right-arm off spin, fast-medium	

== New Zealand ==
Coach: Steve Rixon

No.	Player	Date of birth	Matches	Batting style	Bowling style	First-class team
1	Stephen Fleming (c)	1 April 1973	100	Left-handed	Right-arm offbreak	Canterbury
2	Geoff Allott	24 December 1971	13	Right-handed	Left-arm fast-medium	Canterbury
3	Nathan Astle	15 September 1971	82	Right-handed	Right-arm medium	Canterbury
4.	Carl Bulfin	19 August 1973	3	Right-handed	Right-arm fast-medium	Wellington
5	Chris Cairns	13 June 1970	101	Right-handed	Right-arm fast-medium	Canterbury
6	Simon Doull	6 August 1969	40	Right-handed	Right-arm medium	Northern Districts
7	Chris Harris	20 November 1969	127	Left-handed	Right-arm medium	Canterbury
8	Matthew Hart	16 May 1972	11	Left-handed	Slow left-arm orthodox	Northern Districts
9	Matt Horne	5 December 1970	36	Right-handed	Right-arm medium	Otago
10	Gavin Larsen	27 September 1962	113	Right-handed	Right-arm medium	Wellington
11	Craig McMillan	13 September 1976	39	Right-handed	Right-arm medium	Canterbury
12	Dion Nash	20 November 1971	58	Right-handed	Right-arm fast medium	Northern Districts
13.	Adam Parore (wk)	23 January 1971	114	Right-handed	Wicket-keeper	Auckland
14	Roger Twose	17 April 1968	36	Left-handed	Right-arm medium	Wellington
15	Daniel Vettori	27 January 1979	38	Left-handed	Slow left-arm orthodox	Northern Districts

== Pakistan ==
Coach: Mushtaq Mohammad

No.	Player	Date of birth	Matches	Batting style	Bowling style	First-class team
1	Wasim Akram (c)	3 June 1966	265	Left-handed	Left-arm fast	PIA
2	Moin Khan (wk)	23 September 1971	129	Right-handed	Wicket-keeper	PIA
3	Saleem Malik	16 April 1963	279	Right-handed	Right-arm off-break, slow medium	Lahore
4	Ijaz Ahmed	20 September 1968	226	Right-handed	Left-arm medium	Habib Bank
5	Waqar Younis	16 November 1971	172	Right-handed	Right-arm fast	United Bank Limited
6	Saeed Anwar	6 September 1968	170	Left-handed	Slow left-arm orthodox	National Bank
7	Mushtaq Ahmed	28 June 1970	130	Right-handed	Right-arm leg-break	Multan
8	Inzamam-ul-Haq	3 March 1970	182	Right-handed	Slow left-arm orthodox	Faisalabad
9	Saqlain Mushtaq	29 December 1976	98	Right-handed	Right-arm off break	PIA
10	Shahid Afridi	1 March 1977	82	Right-handed	Right-arm leg spin	Habib Bank
11	Azhar Mahmood	28 February 1975	60	Right-handed	Right-arm fast medium	PIA
12	Abdul Razzaq	2 December 1979	14	Right-handed	Right-arm fast medium	PIA
13	Yousuf Youhana	27 August 1974	20	Right-handed	Right-arm off spin	PIA
14	Shoaib Akhtar	13 August 1975	16	Right-handed	Right-arm fast	Khan Research Labs
15	Wajahatullah Wasti	11 November 1974	3	Right-handed	Right-arm offbreak	Allied Bank Limited

== Scotland ==
No.	Player	Date of birth	Batting style	Bowling style	First-class team
1	George Salmond (c)	1 December 1969	Right-handed	Right-arm medium	
2	Ian Philip	9 June 1958	Right-handed	–	
3	Michael Allingham	6 January 1965	Right-handed	Right-arm medium	
4	John Blain	4 January 1979	Right-handed	Right-arm fast-medium	Northamptonshire
5	James Brinkley	13 March 1974	Right-handed	Right-arm fast-medium	
6	Asim Butt	24 June 1967	Right-handed	Left-arm medium-fast	
7	Alec Davies (wk)	14 August 1962	Right-handed	Wicket-keeper	
8	Nick Dyer	10 September 1969	Right-handed	Right-arm offbreak	
9	Gavin Hamilton	16 September 1974	Left-handed	Right-arm medium-fast	Yorkshire
10	Bruce Patterson	29 January 1965	Right-handed	–	
11	Keith Sheridan	26 March 1971	Right-handed	Left-arm slow	
12	Mike Smith	30 March 1966	Right-handed	Right-arm medium	
13	Ian Stanger	5 October 1971	Right-handed	Right-arm medium	
14	Peter Steindl	14 June 1970	Right-handed	Right-arm medium	
15	Greig Williamson	28 December 1968	Right-handed	Right-arm medium	

== South Africa ==
Coach: Bob Woolmer

No.	Player	Date of birth	Matches	Batting style	Bowling style	First-class team
1	Gary Kirsten	23 November 1967	103	Left-handed	Right-arm off break	Western Province
2	Herschelle Gibbs	23 February 1974	27	Right-handed	Right-arm medium	Western Province
3	Jacques Kallis	16 October 1975	65	Right-handed	Right-arm fast-medium	Western Province
4	Daryll Cullinan	4 March 1967	113	Right-handed	Right-arm off break	Gauteng
5	Hansie Cronje (c)	25 September 1969	159	Right-handed	Right-arm medium	Free State
6	Dale Benkenstein	9 June 1974	10	Right-handed	Right-arm medium, off break	KwaZulu-Natal
7	Shaun Pollock	16 July 1973	70	Right-handed	Right-arm fast-medium	Warwickshire
8	Jonty Rhodes	27 July 1969	151	Right-handed	Right-arm medium	KwaZulu-Natal
9	Mark Boucher (wk)	3 December 1976	30	Right-handed	Wicket-keeper	Border
10	Allan Donald	20 October 1966	112	Right-handed	Right-arm fast	Warwickshire
11	Derek Crookes	5 March 1969	24	Right-handed	Right-arm off-break	Gauteng
12	Alan Dawson	27 November 1969	1	Right-handed	Right-arm medium-fast	Western Province
13	Lance Klusener	4 September 1971	53	Left-handed	Right-arm fast medium	KwaZulu-Natal
14	Steve Elworthy	23 February 1965	15	Right-handed	Right-arm fast-medium	Northerns
15	Nicky Boje	20 March 1973	18	Left-handed	Slow left-arm orthodox	Free State

- Makhaya Ntini was named in the original squad, but was replaced on 23 April 1999 by Alan Dawson following a conviction for a serious criminal offence. The conviction was later overturned.

== Sri Lanka ==
Coach: Roy Dias

No.	Player	Date of birth	Matches	Batting style	Bowling style	First-class team
1	Arjuna Ranatunga (c)	1 December 1963	264	Left-handed	Right-arm medium	Sinhalese SC
2	Muttiah Muralitharan	17 April 1972	110	Right-handed	Right-arm off break	Tamil Union
3	Marvan Atapattu	22 November 1970	69	Right-handed	Right-arm leg spin	Sinhalese SC
4	Mahela Jayawardene	27 May 1977	20	Right-handed	Right-arm medium	Sinhalese SC
5	Roshan Mahanama	31 May 1966	208	Right-handed	–	Bloomfield
6	Hashan Tillakaratne	14 July 1967	180	Left-handed	–	Nondescripts
7	Romesh Kaluwitharana (wk)	24 November 1969	112	Right-handed	Right-arm medium	Sebastianites
8	Chaminda Vaas	27 January 1974	108	Left-handed	Left-arm fast medium	Colts CC
9	Aravinda de Silva (vc)	17 October 1965	254	Right-handed	Right-arm off-break	Nondescripts
10	Pramodya Wickramasinghe	14 August 1971	111	Right-handed	Right-arm fast	Burgher RC
11	Ruwan Kalpage	19 February 1970	86	Left-handed	Right-arm offbreak	Nondescripts CC
12	Upul Chandana	7 May 1972	51	Right-handed	Right-arm leg-break	Tamil Union C&AC
13	Eric Upashantha	10 June 1972	5	Right-handed	Right-arm fast-medium	Colts CC
14	Chandika Hathurusingha	13 September 1968	35	Right-handed	Right-arm medium-fast	Tamil Union
15	Sanath Jayasuriya	30 June 1969	178	Left-handed	Slow Left-arm orthodox	Bloomfield

== West Indies ==
Coach: Malcolm Marshall

No.	Player	Date of birth	Matches	Batting style	Bowling style	First-class team
1	Brian Lara (c)	2 May 1969	141	Left-handed	Right-arm leg break	Trinidad and Tobago
2	Shivnarine Chanderpaul	16 August 1974	66	Left-handed	Right-arm leg break	Guyana
3	Ricardo Powell	16 December 1978	0	Right-handed	Right-arm offbreak	Jamaica
4	Stuart Williams	12 August 1969	53	Right-handed	Right-arm medium	Leeward Islands
5	Sherwin Campbell	1 January 1970	45	Right-handed	Right-arm medium	Barbados
6	Keith Arthurton	21 February 1965	104	Left-handed	Slow left-arm orthodox	Leeward Islands
7	Ridley Jacobs (wk)	26 November 1967	23	Left-handed	Wicket-keeper	Leeward Islands
8	Phil Simmons	18 April 1963	138	Right-handed	Right-arm medium	Trinidad and Tobago
9	Curtly Ambrose	21 September 1963	161	Left-handed	Right-arm fast	Leeward Islands
10	Courtney Walsh	30 October 1962	188	Right-handed	Right-arm medium fast	Jamaica
11	Jimmy Adams	9 January 1968	81	Left-handed	Slow Left-arm orthodox	Jamaica
12	Hendy Bryan	17 March 1970	6	Right-handed	Right-arm fast-medium	Barbados
13	Mervyn Dillon	5 June 1974	16	Right-handed	Right-arm fast-medium	Trinidad and Tobago
14	Nehemiah Perry	16 June 1968	5	Right-handed	Right-arm off break	Jamaica
15	Reon King	6 October 1975	12	Right-handed	Right-arm fast-medium	Guyana

Carl Hooper was named in the original squad, but was replaced on 27 April 1999 by Ricardo Powell following his retirement from international cricket.

== Zimbabwe ==
Coach: David Houghton

No.	Player	Date of birth	Matches	Batting style	Bowling style	First-class team
1	Alistair Campbell (c)	23 September 1972	97	Left-handed	Right-arm off break	Manicaland
2	Andy Flower (wk)	28 April 1968	105	Left-handed	Right-arm off break	Mashonaland
3	Grant Flower	20 December 1970	92	Right-handed	Slow left-arm orthodox	Mashonaland
4	Neil Johnson	24 January 1970	14	Left-handed	Right-arm fast-medium	Western Province
5	Murray Goodwin	11 December 1972	31	Right-handed	Legbreak	Mashonaland
6	Stuart Carlisle	10 May 1972	12	Right-handed	Right-arm medium	Mashonaland
7	Henry Olonga	3 July 1976	7	Right-handed	Right-arm fast	Matabeleland
8	Pommie Mbangwa	26 June 1976	15	Right-handed	Right-arm fast-medium	Matabeleland
9	Heath Streak	16 March 1974	73	Right-handed	Right-arm fast-medium	Matabeleland
10	Adam Huckle	21 September 1971	16	Right-handed	Legbreak googly	Matabeleland
11	Dirk Viljoen	11 March 1977	12	Left-handed	Slow left-arm orthodox	Mashonaland
12	Eddo Brandes	5 March 1963	56	Right-handed	Right-arm fast	Mashonaland
13	Paul Strang	9 June 1972	72	Right-handed	Left-arm medium	Mashonaland
14	Andy Whittall	19 March 1973	44	Right-handed	Right-arm offbreak	Manicaland
15	Guy Whittall	5 September 1972	72	Right-handed	Right-arm medium	Mashonaland
