= President's Cup 1997–98 =

International cricket tournament

President's Cup
- Cricket format: One Day International
- Tournament format(s): Round robin and Final
- Host(s): Kenya
- Champions: Zimbabwe
- Participants: Bangladesh; Kenya; Zimbabwe
- Matches: October 10 – October 19, 1997
- Player of the series: (Zimbabwe) Andy Flower
- Most runs: Andy Flower (375)
- Most wickets: Paul Strang (11)

The Kenya Cricket Association President's Cup was a three team ODI cricket tournament that was held in Kenya during the 1997–98 season.

== Squads ==
Bangladesh
- Akram Khan (c)
- Aminul Islam
- Athar Ali Khan
- Habibul Bashar
- Hasibul Hossain
- Jahangir Alam
- Khaled Mashud (wk)
- Mafizur Rahman
- Minhajul Abedin
- Mohammad Rafique
- Saiful Islam
- Salahuddin Ahmed
- Shafiuddin Ahmed
- Shahriar Hossain
Kenya
- Aasif Karim (c)
- Rajab Ali
- Joseph Angara
- Dipak Chudasama
- Hitesh Modi
- Thomas Odoyo
- Maurice Odumbe
- Kennedy Otieno (wk)
- Mohammad Sheikh
- Tony Suji
- Martin Suji
- Steve Tikolo
- Alpesh Vadher
Zimbabwe
- Alistair Campbell (c)
- Craig Evans
- Andy Flower (wk)
- Grant Flower
- Adam Huckle
- Everton Matambanadzo
- Pommie Mbangwa
- Gavin Rennie
- Bryan Strang
- Paul Strang
- Andy Whittall
- Guy Whittall
- Craig Wishart

== Schedule ==
Date	Match	Venue
October 97
10 October	1st ODI	Gymkhana, Nairobi
11	2nd ODI	Gymkhana, Nairobi
12	3rd ODI	Gymkhana, Nairobi
14	4th ODI	Aga Khan Sports Club Ground, Nairobi
15	5th ODI	Aga Khan Sports Club Ground, Nairobi
16	6th ODI	Aga Khan Sports Club Ground, Nairobi
18	1st Final	Gymkhana, Nairobi
19	2nd Final	Gymkhana, Nairobi

== Points table ==
Place	Team	Played	Won	Lost	Points	NetRR
1	Zimbabwe	4	4	0	8	1.528
2	Kenya	4	2	2	4	1.334
3	Bangladesh	4	0	4	0	-2.920

== Group matches ==
=== 1st match ===
10 October 1997
Scorecard

Kenya; 347/3 (50 overs)	v	Bangladesh; 197 (43.4 overs)
KO Otieno 144 (146); Hasibul Hossain 2/68 (10 overs)		Athar Ali Khan 61 (84); AY Karim 5/33 (10 overs)

Kenya won by 150 runs
Gymkhana Club Ground, Nairobi
Umpires: RE Koertzen (SA) and Saleem Badar (PAK)
Player of the match: KO Otieno (KEN)

- Bangladesh won the toss and elected to field.
- M Sheikh and AV Vadher (both KEN), and Jahangir Alam and Shahriar Hossain (both BAN) made their ODI debuts.

=== 2nd match ===
11 October 1997
Scorecard

Zimbabwe; 305/4 (50 overs)	v	Bangladesh; 257 (47.1 overs)
A Flower 81 (96); Aminul Islam 3/57 (10 overs)		Habibul Bashar 70 (85); GW Flower 2/30 (7 overs)

Zimbabwe won by 48 runs
Gymkhana Club Ground, Nairobi
Umpires: MJ Kitchen (ENG) and RE Koertzen (SA)
Player of the match: GW Flower (ZIM)

- Zimbabwe won the toss and elected to bat.
- Shafiuddin Ahmed (BAN) and AG Huckle (ZIM) made their ODI debuts.

=== 3rd match ===
12 October 1997
Scorecard

Kenya; 249/8 (50 overs)	v	Zimbabwe; 244/4 (46.3 overs)
KO Otieno 87 (122); PA Strang 3/38 (10 overs)		GJ Whittall 83 (105); MA Suji 1/28 (8 overs)

Zimbabwe won by 6 wickets (revised target)
Gymkhana Club Ground, Nairobi
Umpires: MJ Kitchen (ENG) and Saleem Badar (PAK)
Player of the match: GJ Whittall (ZIM)

- Kenya won the toss and elected to bat.
- Zimbabwe's target was revised to 244 runs in 47 overs.

=== 4th match ===
14 October 1997
Scorecard

Zimbabwe; 284 (50 overs)	v	Bangladesh; 92 (32.3 overs)
A Flower 70 (72); Shafiuddin Ahmed 3/42 (10 overs)		Minhajul Abedin 18 (43); BC Strang 6/20 (10 overs)

Zimbabwe won by 192 runs
Aga Khan Sports Club Ground, Nairobi
Umpires: RE Koertzen (SA) and Saleem Badar (PAK)
Player of the match: BC Strang (ZIM)

- Zimbabwe won the toss and elected to bat.

=== 5th match ===
15 October 1997
Scorecard

Bangladesh; 100 (41.2 overs)	v	Kenya; 102/2 (17 overs)
Shahriar Hossain 16 (47); Mafizur Rahman 16 (47); MA Suji 4/24 (10 overs)		KO Otieno 42* (53); AV Vadher 42* (50); Hasibul Hossain 2/54 (6 overs)

Kenya won by 8 wickets
Aga Khan Sports Club Ground, Nairobi
Umpires: MJ Kitchen (ENG) and RE Koertzen (SA)
Player of the match: MA Suji (KEN)

- Bangladesh won the toss and elected to bat.
- The match was reduced before play started to 46 overs per side.

=== 6th match ===
16 October 1997
Scorecard

Kenya; 207/9 (50 overs)	v	Zimbabwe; 210/3 (41.2 overs)
AO Suji 67 (76); GJ Whittall 3/43 (10 overs)		GW Flower 71 (85); SO Tikolo 1/29 (4.2 overs)

Zimbabwe won by 7 wickets
Aga Khan Sports Club Ground, Nairobi
Umpires: RE Koertzen (SA) and Saleem Badar (PAK)
Player of the match: A Flower (ZIM)

- Zimbabwe won the toss and elected to field.

== Finals ==
=== 1st Final ===
18 October 1997
Scorecard

Zimbabwe; 281/8 (50 overs)	v	Kenya; 172/7 (40 overs)
A Flower 79 (90); SO Tikolo 3/41 (10 overs)		MO Odumbe 67 (70); GW Flower 2/6 (2 overs)

Zimbabwe won by 82 runs (revised target)
Gymkhana Club Ground, Nairobi
Umpires: MJ Kitchen (ENG) and RE Koertzen (SA)
Player of the match: A Flower (ZIM)

- Zimbabwe won the toss and elected to bat.
- When rain washed out the Kenya innings after 40 overs, they needed 255 runs to have won.

=== 2nd Final ===
19 October 1997
Scorecard

Zimbabwe; 272/6 (49 overs)	v	Kenya; 190 (46.1 overs)
GW Flower 78 (90); MO Odumbe 1/26 (6 overs)		HS Modi 57 (102); AR Whittall 3/23 (10 overs)

Zimbabwe won by 82 runs
Gymkhana Club Ground, Nairobi
Umpires: RE Koertzen (SA) and Saleem Badar (PAK)
Player of the match: AR Whittall (ZIM)

- Zimbabwe won the toss and elected to bat.
- Rain interrupted the Zimbabwe innings after 41 overs. The match then was reduced to 49 overs per side.
- JO Angara (KEN) made his ODI debut.

The finals took place between Zimbabwe, who were unbeaten throughout the qualifying games, and Kenya. The series was a best of three games and Zimbabwe lifted the trophy after winning the first two finals. It was Zimbabwe's first silverware since receiving Test status in 1992.

In the first final, Alistair Campbell won the toss and sent Kenya into field. Openers Grant and Andy Flower put on 154 for the first wicket to help Zimbabwe to 281 for 8 from their 50 overs. Campbell chipped in with a half century and for Kenya Steve Tikolo took 3/41. Kenya could only manage 172 in reply despite 67 from Maurice Odumbe in the middle order. Guy Whittall and Grant Flower took a couple of wickets each.

Campbell won the toss in the second final and again decided to bat first. This time it was the 3rd wicket partnership that set up the Zimbabwean innings, with Grant Flower and Gavin Rennie putting on 150 runs. Both scored 70s and Zimbabwe finished with 6 for 272. Kenya lost their first 3 wickets to Man of the Match Andy Whittall and were never in the hunt. At one stage they were at 7/71 but Aasif Karim scored his maiden ODI half century and put on a 100 run partnership with Hitesh Modi who also scored a 50. Kenya were eventually dismissed for 190 with Paul Strang joining Whittall on 3 wickets.
