= Sameer Cup 1996–97 =

International cricket tournament

Sameer Cup
- Cricket format: One Day International
- Tournament format(s): Round-robin and Final
- Host: Kenya
- Champions: South Africa
- Participants: Kenya; Pakistan; South Africa; Sri Lanka
- Matches: 28 September – 6 October 1996
- Player of the series: (South Africa) Allan Donald
- Most runs: Gary Kirsten (227)
- Most wickets: Allan Donald (14)

The Kenya Cricket Association Centenary Tournament (also known as the Sameer Cup) was a four-team ODI cricket tournament held in Kenya during the 1996–97 season.

== Squads ==
Squads
Kenya	Pakistan	South Africa	Sri Lanka
Maurice Odumbe (c)	Saeed Anwar (c)	Hansie Cronje (c)	Arjuna Ranatunga (c)
Rajab Ali	Azhar Mahmood	Derek Crookes	Upul Chandana
Dipak Chudasama	Ijaz Ahmed	Daryll Cullinan	Aravinda de Silva
Sandeep Gupta	Moin Khan (wk)	Fanie de Villiers	Sajeewa de Silva
Aasif Karim	Rameez Raja	Allan Donald	Kumar Dharmasena
Hitesh Modi	Saeed Azad	Herschelle Gibbs	Asanka Gurusinha
Thomas Odoyo	Saleem Elahi	Andrew Hudson	Sanath Jayasuriya
Tito Odumbe	Saleem Malik	Gary Kirsten	Romesh Kaluwitharana (wk)
Lameck Onyango	Saqlain Mushtaq	Brian McMillan	Roshan Mahanama
Kennedy Otieno (wk)	Shahid Afridi	Craig Matthews	Muttiah Muralitharan
Tony Suji	Shahid Nazir	Jonty Rhodes	Hashan Tillakaratne
Martin Suji	Waqar Younis	Dave Richardson (wk)	Chaminda Vaas
Steve Tikolo	Wasim Akram	Pat Symcox

== Points table ==
Place	Team	Played	Won	Lost	Points	NetRR
1	South Africa	3	2	1	4	1.518
2	Pakistan	3	2	1	4	0.498
3	Sri Lanka	3	2	1	4	0.496
4	Kenya	3	0	3	0	-2.396

== Group matches ==
=== 1st match ===
28 September 1996
Scorecard

Kenya; 188/9 (50 overs)	v	Sri Lanka; 190/3 (30.4 overs)
HS Modi 78* (105); M Muralitharan 4/18 (10 overs)		RS Kaluwitharana 100* (89); EO Odumbe 2/29 (4 overs)

Sri Lanka won by 7 wickets
Gymkhana Club Ground, Nairobi
Umpires: ID Robinson (ZIM) and RB Tiffin (ZIM)
Player of the match: M Muralitharan (SL)

- Sri Lanka won the toss and elected to field.
- SK Gupta (KEN) and KSC de Silva (SL) made their ODI debuts.

=== 2nd match ===
29 September 1996
Scorecard

South Africa; 321/8 (50 overs)	v	Pakistan; 259 (42.3 overs)
DJ Cullinan 124 (117); Saqlain Mushtaq 3/42 (10 overs)		Ijaz Ahmed 88 (63); AA Donald 3/29 (8 overs)

South Africa won by 62 runs
Gymkhana Club Ground, Nairobi
Umpires: SK Bansal (IND) and RB Tiffin (ZIM)
Player of the match: JN Rhodes (SA)

- Pakistan won the toss and elected to field.

=== 3rd match ===
1 October 1996
Scorecard

South Africa; 169 (42 overs)	v	Sri Lanka; 170/8 (40.4 overs)
DJ Cullinan 51 (73); M Muralitharan 4/35 (10 overs)		ST Jayasuriya 45 (30); PL Symcox 2/20 (10 overs)

Sri Lanka won by 2 wickets
Nairobi Club Ground, Nairobi
Umpires: ID Robinson (ZIM) and RB Tiffin (ZIM)
Player of the match: ST Jayasuriya (SL)

- South Africa won the toss and elected to bat.

=== 4th match ===
2 October 1996
Scorecard

Kenya; 148 (47 overs)	v	Pakistan; 149/6 (40.2 overs)
DN Chudasama 51 (135); Saqlain Mushtaq 3/27 (10 overs)		Moin Khan 50* (72); TM Odoyo 3/25 (10 overs)

Pakistan won by 4 wickets
Aga Khan Sports Club Ground, Nairobi
Umpires: SK Bansal (IND) and ID Robinson (ZIM)
Player of the match: TM Odoyo (KEN)

- Kenya won the toss and elected to bat.
- AO Suji (KEN) and Shahid Afridi (PAK) made their ODI debuts.

=== 5th match ===
3 October 1996
Scorecard

South Africa; 305/8 (50 overs)	v	Kenya; 103 (25.1 overs)
G Kirsten 66 (73); AY Karim 2/44 (10 overs)		DN Chudasama 29 (41); AA Donald 6/23 (9 overs)

South Africa won by 202 runs
Gymkhana Club Ground, Nairobi
Umpires: SK Bansal (IND) and RB Tiffin (ZIM)
Player of the match: AA Donald (SA)

- South Africa won the toss and elected to bat.
- HH Gibbs (SA) made his ODI debut.

=== 6th match ===
4 October 1996
Scorecard

Pakistan; 371/9 (50 overs)	v	Sri Lanka; 289 (49.5 overs)
Saeed Anwar 115 (120); ST Jayasuriya 3/94 (10 overs)		PA de Silva 122 (116); Waqar Younis 5/52 (8.5 overs)

Pakistan won by 82 runs
Gymkhana Club Ground, Nairobi
Umpires: ID Robinson (ZIM) and RB Tiffin (ZIM)
Player of the match: Shahid Afridi (PAK)

- Sri Lanka won the toss and elected to field.
- Sri Lanka required 290 to make the final on net run rate.

== Final ==
6 October 1996
Scorecard

Pakistan; 203 (46.2 overs)	v	South Africa; 204/3 (39.2 overs)
Ijaz Ahmed 47 (68); DN Crookes 3/30 (10 overs)		G Kirsten 118* (127); Shahid Afridi 3/48 (10 overs)

South Africa won by 7 wickets
Gymkhana Club Ground, Nairobi
Umpires: SK Bansal (IND) and ID Robinson (ZIM)
Player of the match: G Kirsten (SA)

- Pakistan won the toss and elected to bat.

The final took place between South Africa and Pakistan at the Gymkhana Club Ground in Nairobi. Pakistan had qualified for the final by edging past Sri Lanka on net run rate, largely due to their first innings effort of 9 for 371 when the two teams met.

Saeed Anwar won the toss for Pakistan and elected to bat first. They were all out of 203 in the 46th over with Allan Donald and Derek Crookes taking 3 wickets each. Ijaz Ahmed top-scored for Pakistan with 47. In reply the South Africans started off well, putting on 77 for the 1st wicket before Shahid Afridi took a couple of quick wickets. Gary Kirsten finished unbeaten on 118 off 127 balls as his side reached their target in the 39th over. Kirsten was named the Man of the Match.
