= 2000 KnockOut Trophy squads =

List of cricket players and squads

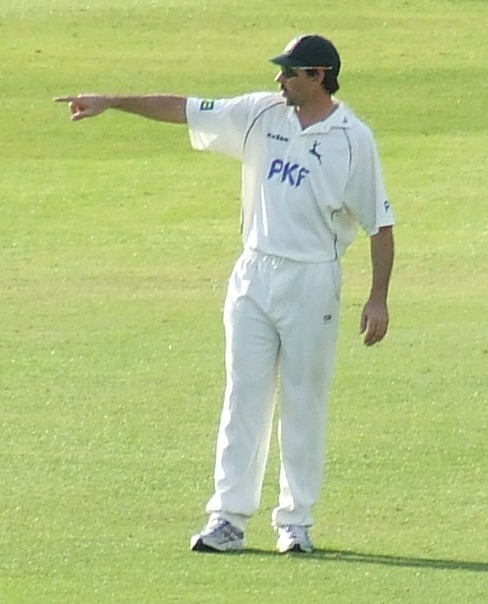
New Zealand player Stephen Fleming, captain of the winning team

These were the squads of cricket players seclected for the 2000 ICC KnockOut Trophy, the second instalment of what was to become the ICC Champions Trophy. The tournament was held in Kenya from 3 to 15 October 2000. New Zealand won the tournament, defeating India in the final by four wickets winning their first ICC event.

== Squads ==
=== Australia ===
Shane Warne and Collin Miller were originally selected in the squad, but later withdrew due to injuries. They were replaced by Mark Higgs and Brad Young.

No.	Player	Date of birth	Batting style	Bowling style	List A team
90	Steve Waugh (captain)	2 June 1965	Right-handed	Right-arm medium	New South Wales
129	Adam Gilchrist (vc) (wk)	14 November 1971	Left-handed	Wicket-keeper	Western Australia
116	Michael Bevan	8 May 1970	Left-handed	Left-arm unorthodox spin	New South Wales
4	Jason Gillespie	19 April 1975	Right-handed	Right-arm medium	South Australia
29	Ian Harvey	10 April 1972	Right-handed	Right-arm medium	Victoria
29	Mark Higgs	30 June 1976	Left-handed	Left-arm orthodox	New South Wales
58	Brett Lee	8 November 1976	Right-handed	Right-arm fast	New South Wales
-	Shane Lee	8 August 1973	Right-handed	Right-arm medium	New South Wales
109	Damien Martyn	21 October 1971	Right-handed	Right-arm medium	Western Australia
113	Glenn McGrath	9 February 1970	Right-handed	Right-arm fast-medium	New South Wales
123	Ricky Ponting	19 December 1974	Right-handed	Right-arm medium	Tasmania
63	Andrew Symonds	9 June 1975	Right-handed	Right-arm medium	Queensland
105	Mark Waugh	2 June 1965	Right-handed	Right-arm medium Right-arm off break	New South Wales
-	Brad Young	23 February 1973	Right-handed	Slow left-arm orthodox	South Australia

- Source:CricInfo

=== Bangladesh ===
No.	Player	Date of birth	Batting style	Bowling style	List A team
-	Naimur Rahman (captain)	19 September 1974	Right-handed	Right-arm off-break	Dhaka Metropolis
-	Khaled Mashud (wicket-keeper)	8 February 1976	Right-handed		Rajshahi Division
-	Javed Omar	25 November 1976	Right-handed	Right-arm leg spin	Dhaka Division
-	Shahriar Hossain	1 June 1976	Right-handed	Right-arm off-break	Dhaka Division
7	Habibul Bashar	17 August 1972	Right-handed	Right-arm off-break	Khulna Division
-	Akram Khan	1 November 1968	Right-handed	Right-arm medium	Chittagong Division
-	Aminul Islam	2 February 1968	Right-handed	Right-arm off-break	Dhaka Division
-	Al Sahariar	23 April 1978	Right-handed	Right-arm leg-break	Dhaka Metropolis
-	Enamul Haque	27 February 1966	Left-handed	Left-arm orthodox	Chittagong Division
-	Hasibul Hossain	3 June 1977	Right-handed	Right-arm medium	Sylhet Division
96	Manjural Islam	4 May 1984	Left-handed	Left-arm orthodox	Khulna Division
77	Mohammad Rafique	5 September 1970	Left-handed	Left-arm orthodox	Sylhet Division
-	Ranjan Das	14 July 1982	Right-handed	Left-arm medium	Dhaka Division

- Source:CricInfo

=== England ===
No.	Player	Date of birth	Batting style	Bowling style	List A team
3	Nasser Hussain (captain)	28 March 1968	Right-handed	Right-arm leg-break	Essex
151	Mark Alleyne	23 May 1968	Left-handed	Right-arm medium	Gloucestershire
-	Andy Caddick	21 November 1968	Right-handed	Right-arm medium	Somerset
136	Mark Ealham	27 August 1969	Right-handed	Right-arm fast-medium	Kent
11	Andrew Flintoff	6 December 1977	Right-handed	Right-arm fast	Lancashire
-	Paul Grayson	31 March 1971	Right-handed	Left-arm orthodox spin	Essex
145	Ashley Giles	19 March 1973	Right-handed	Left-arm orthodox spin	Warwickshire
8	Darren Gough	18 September 1970	Right-handed	Right-arm fast	Yorkshire
22	Matthew Hoggard	31 December 1976	Right-handed	Right-arm medium	Yorkshire
-	Graeme Hick	23 May 1966	Right-handed	Right-arm off-break	Worcestershire
38	Vikram Solanki	1 April 1976	Right-handed	Right-arm off-break	Worcestershire
96	Alec Stewart (wicket-keeper)	8 April 1963	Left-handed	Wicket-keeper	Surrey
23	Marcus Trescothick	25 December 1975	Right-handed	Right-arm medium	Somerset
9	Graham Thorpe	1 August 1969	Left-handed	Right-arm medium	Surrey
6	Craig White	16 December 1969	Right-handed	Right-arm medium	Yorkshire

- Source:CricInfo

=== India ===
No.	Player	Date of birth	Batting style	Bowling style	List A team
84	Sourav Ganguly (captain)	8 July 1972	Left-handed	Right-arm medium	Bengal
74	Sachin Tendulkar	24 April 1973	Right-handed	Right-arm spin	Bombay
95	Rahul Dravid	11 January 1973	Right-handed	Right-arm off break	Karnataka
-	Vinod Kambli	18 January 1972	Left-handed	Right-arm off-break	Mumbai
111	Ajit Agarkar	4 December 1977	Right-handed	Right-arm fast-medium	Bombay
-	Sridharan Sriram	21 February 1976	Left-handed	Leftt arm orthodox	Tamil Nadu
98	Sunil Joshi	6 June 1970	Left-handed	Left-arm orthodox spin	Karnataka
78	Anil Kumble	17 October 1970	Right-handed	Right-arm leg break Googly	Karnataka
71	Robin Singh	14 September 1963	Left-handed	Right-arm medium-fast	Tamil Nadu
12	Yuvraj Singh	12 December 1981	Left-handed	Left-arm orthodox	Punjab
89	Venkatesh Prasad	5 August 1969	Right-handed	Right-arm medium-fast	Karnataka
88	Hemang Badani	19 December 1969	Left-handed	Left-arm orthodox	Tamil Nadu
-	Vijay Dahiya (wicket-keeper)	11 May 1973	Right-handed	Wicket-keeper	Delhi
34	Zaheer Khan	7 October 1978	Right-handed	Left-arm fast-medium	Baroda

- Source:CricInfo

=== Kenya ===
No.	Player	Date of birth	Batting style	Bowling style	List A team
-	Maurice Odumbe (captain)	15 June 1969	Right-handed	Right-arm off-break	Aga Khan
-	Steve Tikolo	25 June 1971	Right-handed	Right-arm medium	Border
-	Kennedy Otieno (wicket-keeper)	11 March 1972	Right-handed	Wicket-keeper	Kongonis
-	Ravindu Shah	28 August 1972	Right-handed	Right-arm medium	
-	Thomas Odoyo	12 May 1978	Right-handed	Right-arm medium	
-	Hitesh Modi	13 October 1971	Left-handed	Right-arm off-break	
-	Tony Suji	5 February 1976	Right-handed	Right-arm medium	
-	Martin Suji	2 June 1971	Right-handed	Right-arm medium	
-	Mohammad Sheikh	29 August 1980	Left-handed	Left-arm orthodox	
-	Lameck Onyango	22 September 1973	Right-handed	Right-arm medium	
-	Peter Ongondo	10 February 1977	Right-handed	Right-arm medium	
-	Josephat Ababu	14 May 1980	Right-handed	Right-arm medium	
-	Jimmy Kamande	12 December 1978	Right-handed	Right-arm medium	

- Source:CricInfo

=== New Zealand ===
No.	Player	Date of birth	Batting style	Bowling style	List A team
88	Stephen Fleming (captain)	1 April 1973	Left-handed	Right-arm medium	Wellington
98	Geoff Allott	24 December 1971	Right-handed	Left-arm fast-medium	Canterbury
93	Nathan Astle	15 September 1971	Right-handed	Right-arm medium	Canterbury
72	Chris Harris	20 November 1969	Left-handed	Right-arm medium	Canterbury
102	Craig McMillan	13 September 1976	Right-handed	Right-arm medium	Canterbury
6	Chris Cairns	13 June 1970	Right-handed	Right-arm medium	Canterbury
-	Dion Nash	20 November 1971	Right-handed	Right-arm medium	Auckland
-	Chris Nevin (wicket-keeper)	3 August 1975	Right-handed	Wicket-keeper	Wellington
80	Adam Parore (wicket-keeper)	23 January 1971	Right-handed	Wicket-keeper	Auckland
105	Paul Wiseman	4 May 1970	Right-handed	Right-arm off break	Otago
-	Craig Spearman	4 July 1972	Right-handed		Central Districts
56	Scott Styris	10 July 1975	Right-handed	Right-arm fast-medium	Northern Districts
-	Glen Sulzberger	14 March 1973	Left-handed	Right-arm off-spin	Central Districts
-	Roger Twose	17 April 1968	Left-handed	Right-arm medium	Wellington

- Source:CricInfo

=== Pakistan ===
No.	Player	Date of birth	Batting style	Bowling style	List A team
79	Moin Khan (captain) (wicket-keeper)	23 September 1971	Right-handed	Wicket-keeper	Karachi
8	Inzamam-ul-Haq	3 March 1970	Left-handed	Right-arm orthodox	Faisalabad
123	Saeed Anwar	6 September 1968	Left-handed	Left-arm orthodox	Karachi
-	Imran Nazir	16 December 1981	Right-handed	Right-arm legbreak	Lahore
102	Saleem Elahi	21 November 1976	Right-handed	Right-arm off break	Lahore
122	Yousuf Youhana	27 August 1974	Right-handed	Right-arm off break	Lahore
60	Ijaz Ahmed	20 September 1968	Right-handed	Left-arm medium	Islamabad
-	Faisal Iqbal	30 December 1981	Right-handed	Right-arm medium	Karachi
99	Waqar Younis	16 November 1971	Right-handed	Right-arm fast	Lahore
53	Wasim Akram	3 June 1966	Left-handed	Left-arm fast	Lahore
108	Azhar Mahmood	28 February 1975	Right-handed	Right-arm fast-medium	Islamabad
87	Arshad Khan	22 March 1971	Right-handed	Right-arm off break	Peshawar
-	Abdul Razzaq	2 December 1979	Right-handed	Right-arm medium	Lahore
103	Saqlain Mushtaq	29 December 1976	Right-handed	Right-arm off break	Islamabad

- Source:CricInfo

=== South Africa ===
No.	Player	Date of birth	Batting style	Bowling style	List A team
39	Shaun Pollock (captain)	16 July 1973	Right-handed	Right-arm fast-medium	KwaZulu-Natal
46	Mark Boucher (wicket-keeper)	3 December 1976	Right-handed	Wicket-keeper	Border
-	Shafiek Abrahams	4 March 1968	Right-handed	Right-arm off-break	Eastern Province
34	Nicky Boje	20 March 1973	Left-handed	Left-arm orthodox	Free State
10	Allan Donald	20 October 1966	Right-handed	Right-arm off break	Free State
99	Andrew Hall	31 July 1975	Right-handed	Right-arm medium	Gauteng
38	Jacques Kallis	16 October 1975	Right-handed	Right-arm fast-medium	Western Province
28	Gary Kirsten	23 November 1967	Left-handed	Right-arm off break	Western Province
69	Lance Klusener	4 September 1971	Left-handed	Right-arm fast-medium	KwaZulu-Natal
4	Neil McKenzie	24 November 1975	Right-handed	Right-arm fast-medium	Northerns
25	Boeta Dippenaar	14 June 1977	Right-handed	Right-arm off break	Free State
47	Makhaya Ntini	6 July 1977	Right-handed	Right-arm fast	Border
17	Jonty Rhodes	27 July 1969	Right-handed	Right-arm medium	KwaZulu-Natal
52	Roger Telemachus	27 March 1973	Right-handed	Right-arm fast-medium	Boland

- Source:CricInfo

=== Sri Lanka ===
No.	Player	Date of birth	Batting style	Bowling style	List A team
58	Sanath Jayasuriya (captain)	30 June 1969	Left-handed	Left-arm orthodox spin	Bloomfield
59	Marvan Atapattu (vice-captain)	22 November 1970	Right-handed	Right-arm leg break	Sinhalese SC
93	Avishka Gunawardene	26 May 1977	Left-handed	–	Sinhalese SC
92	Mahela Jayawardene	27 May 1977	Left-handed	Right-arm medium	Sinhalese SC
11	Kumar Sangakkara (wicket-keeper)	31 May 1966	Right-handed	Right-arm off break	Nondescripts
24	Russel Arnold	25 October 1973	Left-handed	Right-arm off break	Nondescripts
78	Upul Chandana	7 May 1972	Right-handed	Right-arm leg break	Nondescripts CC
70	Muttiah Muralitharan	17 April 1972	Right-handed	Right-arm off break	Tamil Union
82	Kumar Dharmasena	24 April 1971	Right-handed	Right-arm off break	Bloomfield
75	Chaminda Vaas	27 January 1974	Left-handed	Left-arm fast-medium	Colts CC
-	Eric Upashantha	10 June 1972	Right-handed	Right-arm fast-medium	Colts
61	Romesh Kaluwitharana (wicket-keeper)	24 November 1969	Right-handed	Wicket-keeper	Sebastianites
64	Pramodya Wickramasinghe	14 August 1971	Right-handed	Right-arm fast-medium	Sinhalese SC
89	Nuwan Zoysa	13 May 1978	Left-handed	Left-arm fast-medium	Sinhalese SC

- Source:CricInfo

=== West Indies ===
No.	Player	Date of birth	Batting style	Bowling style	List A team
-	Jimmy Adams (captain)	9 January 1968	Left-handed	Left-arm orthodox	Jamaica
-	Sherwin Campbell	1 January 1970	Right-handed	Right-arm fast-medium	Barbados
-	Azeemul Haniff	24 October 1977	Left-handed		Guyana
61	Wavell Hinds	7 September 1976	Left-handed	Right-arm medium	Jamaica
59	Brian Lara	2 May 1969	Left-handed	Right-arm leg break Googly	Trinidad and Tobago
-	Sylvester Joseph	5 September 1978	Right-handed	Right-arm off break	Leeward Islands
-	Marlon Samuels	5 February 1981	Left-handed	Right-arm off break	Jamaica
85	Mahendra Nagamootoo	9 October 1975	Left-handed	Right-arm leg break Googly	Guyana
87	Courtney Browne (wicket-keeper)	7 December 1970	Right-handed	Wicket-keeper	Barbados
76	Laurie Williams	12 December 1968	Left-handed	Right-arm medium	Jamaica
78	Nixon McLean	20 July 1973	Left-handed	Right-arm fast	Windward Islands
86	Mervyn Dillon	5 June 1974	Right-handed	Right-arm fast-medium	Trinidad and Tobago
-	Kerry Jeremy	6 February 1980	Right-handed	Right-arm medium	Leeward Islands
68	Colin Stuart	28 September 1973	Right-handed	Right-arm medium	Guyana

- Source:CricInfo

=== Zimbabwe ===
No.	Player	Date of birth	Batting style	Bowling style	List A team
34	Heath Streak (captain)	16 March 1974	Right-handed	Right-arm fast-medium	Matabeleland
-	Guy Whittall	5 September 1972	Right-handed	Right-arm fast-medium	Manicaland
22	Alistair Campbell	23 September 1972	Left-handed	Right-arm off break	Mashonaland
-	Stuart Carlisle	10 May 1972	Right-handed	Right-arm fast-medium	Mashonaland
20	Andy Flower (wicket-keeper)	28 April 1968	Left-handed	Wicket-keeper	Mashonaland
27	Grant Flower	20 December 1970	Right-handed	Left-arm orthodox	Mashonaland
-	Mpumelelo Mbangwa	26 June 1976	Right-handed	Right-arm fast-medium	Mashonaland
-	Mluleki Nkala	1 April 1981	Right-handed	Right-arm medium	Matabeleland
41	Henry Olonga	3 July 1976	Right-handed	Right-arm fast	Mashonaland
47	Gavin Rennie	12 January 1976	Left-handed	Left-arm orthodox	Mashonaland
38	Paul Strang	28 July 1970	Right-handed	Right-arm leg break Googly	Mashonaland
-	Mark Vermeulen	2 March 1979	Left-handed	Right-arm off-break	Matabeleland
-	Dirk Viljoen	11 March 1977	Left-handed	Left-arm orthodox	Mashonaland
44	Craig Wishart	9 January 1974	Right-handed	Right-arm off break	Mashonaland

- Source:CricInfo
