= List of Kenya national cricket captains =

This is a list of all cricketers who have captained Kenya in an official international match. This includes the ICC Trophy, Under-19 games and One Day International. The tables are correct as of the 2007 Cricket World Cup.

== Overall list ==
A list of captains from when Kenya played its first match in 1951 until it was given ODI status in 1996.

Kenya Cricket Captains
No.	Name	Years
1	Denis Dawson	1951-1958
2	Chandrakant M. Patel	1958
3	T.M. Bell	1958
4	Ramanbhai Patel	1960-1964
5	Gursharan Singh	1964-1967
6	Derek Breed	1967
7	Virendra Desai	1968
8	Don Pringle	1968
9	Mehmood Quaraishy	1970
10	Jawahir Shah	1972-1976
11	Charanjive Sharma	1976-1979
12	Ramesh Patel	1980-1984
13	Zahoor Sheikh	1982
14	Tom Tikolo	1986-1994
15	Aasif Karim	1990
16	Maurice Odumbe	1995-1997

== One Day Internationals ==
Kenya played their first ODI on February 18, 1996.

Kenyan ODI Captains
Number	Name	Year	Played	Won	Tied	Lost	No Result
1	Maurice Odumbe	1996–2001	20	1	-	18	1
2	Aasif Karim	1997–1999	21	6	-	15	-
3	Steve Tikolo	2001–2011	73	27	-	44	2
4	Thomas Odoyo	2002–2006	2	-	-	1	1
5	Morris Ouma	2009–2010	17	2	-	14	1
7	Jimmy Kamande	2010/11	9	2	-	7	-
8	Collins Obuya	2011–2013	10	3	-	7	-
9	Rakep Patel	2014	2	1	-	1	-
Overall			154	42	0	107	5

== T20 Internationals ==
Kenya played their first T20I in September 2007.

Kenyan T20I Captains
Number	Name	Year	Played	Won	Tied	Lost	No Result
1	Steve Tikolo	2007-2009	7	1	-	6	-
2	Thomas Odoyo	2007	1	-	-	1	-
3	Morris Ouma	2010	4	3	-	1	-
4	Collins Obuya	2012-2013	17	6	-	11	-
Overall			29	10	-	19	-

== ICC Cricket World Cup Qualifier (ICC Trophy) ==
Kenya debuted in the ICC Trophy in the 1982 tournament

Kenyan ICC Trophy (ICC Cricket World Cup Qualifier) Captains
Number	Name	Year	Played	Won	Tied	Lost	No Result
1	Ramesh Patel	1982	6	3	0	2	1
2	Tom Tikolo	1986-1993/94	22	13	0	9	0
3	Maurice Odumbe	1997	10	8	0	1	1
4	Steve Tikolo	2009	10	6	0	4	0
5	Rakep Patel	2014	7	3	0	4	0
Overall			55	33	0	20	2

== Youth One-Day International captains ==
This is a list of Kenyans who have captained their country in an Under-19's ODI.

Kenyan Under 19's Captains
Number	Name	Year	Played	Won	Tied	Lost	No Result
1	Thomas Odoyo	1997-1998	6	3	0	3	0
2	Mohammad Sheikh	1999-2000	5	1	0	4	0
3	Ragheb Aga	2001-2002	6	1	0	5	0
Overall			17	5	0	12	0
