= New Zealand cricket team in Kenya in 1997–98 =

New Zealand national cricket team tour

The New Zealand national cricket team toured Kenya In September 1997 and played three matches against Kenya en route to their tour of Zimbabwe.

== Matches ==
4–6 September 1997
Scorecard

New Zealand	v	Kenya
280/6d (73 overs); Craig Spearman 103 (113); Brijal Patel 3/37 (11 overs)		250 (73.1 overs); Steve Tikolo 125 (111); Paul Wiseman 3/58 (14 overs)
244/4d (53.1 overs); Matt Horne 64 (90); Aasif Karim 2/60 (13 overs)		207/5 (70 overs); Alpesh Vadher 62 (152); Paul Wiseman 4/64 (19 overs)

Match drawn
Aga Khan Sports Club Ground, Nairobi
Umpires: Subhash Modi and V. Raval

- New Zealand won the toss and decided to bat

7 September 1997
Scorecard

New Zealand; 363/6 (50 overs)	v	Kenya; 256/8 (50 overs)
Chris Cairns 157; David Tikolo 2/20 (2 overs)		Kennedy Otieno 105; Gavin Larsen 2/28 (8 overs)

New Zealand won by 117 runs
Gymkhana Club Ground, Nairobi
Umpires: Subhash Modi and Anil Sarkar

- New Zealand won the toss and decided to bat

9 September 1997
Scorecard

Kenya; 206/8 (50 overs)	v	New Zealand; 210/3 (38.2 overs)
Alpesh Vadher 75*; Shayne O'Connor 2/22 (6 overs)		Blair Pocock 83*; Aasif Karim 2/25 (10 overs)

New Zealand won by 7 wickets
Nairobi Club Ground, Nairobi
Umpires: Yuniz Cockar and Richard Tippy

- Kenya won the toss and decided to bat
