= Tikolo =

Tikolo is a Kenyan surname.

== Notable people ==
Notable people with this surname include:

- David Tikolo (born 1964), Kenyan cricketer
- Steve Tikolo (born 1971), Kenyan cricketer
- Tom Tikolo (born 1961), Kenyan cricketer
- Keith Tikolo (born 1992) Kenyan businessman and philanthropist
