= Odumbe =

Odumbe is a surname. Notable people with the surname include:

- Edward Odumbe (born 1965), Kenyan cricketer
- Maurice Odumbe (born 1969), Kenyan cricketer
