= Runish Gudhka =

Kenyan cricketer (born 1989)

Personal information
- Full name: Runish Dinesh Gudhka
- Born: 6 September 1989 (age 37); Nairobi, Kenya
- Batting: Right-handed
- Bowling: Right-arm offbreak
- Role: Opening batsman

International information
- National side: Kenya (2011)
- ODI debut (cap 45): 12 September 2011 v Netherlands
- Last ODI: 13 September 2011 v Netherlands

Domestic team information
- Years: Team
- Nairobi Buffaloes

Career statistics
Competition	ODI	FC	LA
Matches	2	1	4
Runs scored	17	4	29
Batting average	17.00	2.00	9.66
100s/50s	0/0	0/0	0/0
Top score	10	4	10
Balls bowled	78	192	2168
Wickets	1	1	3
Bowling average	60.00	113.00	34.66
5 wickets in innings	0	0	0
10 wickets in match	0	0	0
Best bowling	1/41	1/74	1/13
Catches/stumpings	0/0	0/–	0/–
- Source: Cricinfo, 13 May 2017

Runish Gudhka (born 6 September 1989) is a Kenyan cricketer who played for the national side. He has played in two One Day International matches and last played cricket in 2012.
