= Tanmay Mishra =

Kenyan cricketer (born 1986)

Personal information
- Full name: Tanmay Mishra
- Born: 22 December 1986 (age 39); Mumbai, India
- Batting: Right-handed
- Bowling: Right-arm medium-fast
- Role: Middle order batsman

International information
- National side: Kenya (2006–2013)
- ODI debut (cap 30): 25 February 2006 v Zimbabwe
- Last ODI: 2 July 2013 v Scotland
- T20I debut (cap 4): 1 September 2007 v Bangladesh
- Last T20I: 5 July 2013 v Scotland

Domestic team information
- Years: Team
- 2012: Deccan Chargers
- 2019/20: Tripura
- 2023/24: Meghalaya

Career statistics
Competition	ODI	T20I	FC	LA
Matches	42	15	17	56
Runs scored	1,128	227	920	1,509
Batting average	34.18	15.13	31.72	33.53
100s/50s	0/8	0/0	1/7	0/11
Top score	72	38	108	72
Balls bowled	9	30	102	9
Wickets	1	3	1	1
Bowling average	12.00	11.00	66.00	12.00
5 wickets in innings	0	0	0	0
10 wickets in match	0	0	0	0
Best bowling	1/6	3/25	1/53	1/6
Catches/stumpings	16/–	3/–	21/–	17/–
- Source: ESPNcricinfo, 1 July 2015

Tanmay Mishra (born 22 December 1986) is an Indian-born former cricketer. A right-handed aggressive middle-order batsman, he made his One Day International debut for Kenya in 2006 against Zimbabwe at Bulawayo.

== Early life ==
Born in Mumbai, he moved to Nairobi, Kenya in 1994, at the age of 8.

== Career ==
In 2007, Mishra enrolled himself in an Indian university, which prevented him from making any appearances for the Kenyan national side for the next three years. He returned to the national team in 2010 October.

Mishra was bought by the Deccan Chargers ahead of IPL 5, signed as an 'Indian' as he has an Indian passport (India does not allow dual citizenship). In the 2014 IPL players auction, he was bought by the Royal Challengers Bangalore for Rs. 1 million.

In the domestic circle, he scored his first List A century in 2019, 13 years after he had played his first domestic one-day match. His ton came in Tripura's 2019–20 Vijay Hazare Trophy match against Madhya Pradesh.

He played in the 2011 Cricket World Cup, scoring 133 runs in five matches. He was Kenya's second-highest scorer behind Collins Obuya. He made his highest ODI score of 72 in the match against Australia, when he and Obuya put on 115 for the fourth wicket.
