= Gymkhana Club Ground =

Cricket ground and team in Nairobi, Kenya

Coordinates: 1°16′12″S 36°49′38.5″E

Nairobi Gymkhana Club
- Interactive map of Nairobi Gymkhana Club

Ground information
- Location: Nairobi, Kenya
- Country: Kenya
- Capacity: 7,000
- End names
- City End; Forest Road End

International information
- First men's ODI: 28 September 1996: Kenya v Sri Lanka
- Last men's ODI: 11 October 2010: Kenya v Afghanistan
- First men's T20I: 1 September 2007: Kenya v Bangladesh
- Last men's T20I: 19 October 2024: Zimbabwe v Seychelles
- First women's T20I: 13 December 2022: Kenya v Uganda
- Last women's T20I: 21 December 2022: Kenya v Uganda

Team information
East Africa	(1958–1986)
Kenya	(1986–present)
- As of 19 October 2024; Source: CricketArchive

Nairobi Gymkhana Club is a cricket ground and team in Nairobi, Kenya. It hosted two matches during the 2003 Cricket World Cup. The ground has a capacity of 7,000 people. It is located north of the central business district, but not far from it. The ground is the main cricket venue in the country and the only one which could in any way be described as a major ground.

== Cricket ==
The ground is home to a cricket team of the same name, which is one of the oldest cricket clubs in Kenya. Earlier the ground was called Suleman Verjee Indian Gymkhana having been donated by the Suleman Verjee family at a time when no recreational facilities of scale were available to Indians in Kenya. The land was allocated by the Governor of Kenya to the Indian Association in 1927.

The ground is home to one of Kenya's oldest and most influential clubs, the Gymkhana has hosted colonial and other important matches since the early 1900s but it really began to develop as Kenya became a serious force in world cricket in the 1990s.

It has become the main cricket ground in Kenya and hosts International games for the National team. It was at this ground, that Shahid Afridi scored the (then) fastest ODI century in 1997 from just 37 balls.

Investment in the ground accelerated with ICC grants which enabled it to host the 2000 ICC Champions Trophy although since then it has suffered from a lack on investment resulting from Kenya's internal problems. The ground itself is a mixture of grass banking and wooden stands, with a modern pavilion on one side and a new media centre, constructed for the 2000 tournament, at one end.

As with many such clubs in Kenya, the Gymkhana is home to a variety of other sports as well as providing comfortable accommodation. Situated almost 5,500 feet above sea level, it is one of the highest first-class grounds.

The 2026 Asian Legends League (Season 2) is scheduled to be held at the Nairobi Gymkhana Club from 2 to 14 June 2026. The tournament is expected to feature six Asian teams competing in a total of 19 Twenty20 (T20) matches during the season.

== Facilities ==
The Gymkhana club also has a small inside area with a badminton court and further in, an outdoor area with a swimming pool and a restaurant.

== Transportation ==
Nairobi Gymkhana is situated a 20-minute taxi ride and is about 15 km from the airport. Parking near the ground is limited.

== List of Centuries ==
=== One Day Internationals ===
No.	Score	Player	Team	Balls	Inns.	Opposing team	Date	Result
1	100*	Romesh Kaluwitharana	Sri Lanka	89	2	Kenya	28 September 1996	Won
2	124	Daryll Cullinan	South Africa	117	1	Pakistan	29 September 1996	Won
3	121	Jonty Rhodes	South Africa	114	1	Pakistan	29 September 1996	Won
4	115	Saeed Anwar	Pakistan	120	1	Sri Lanka	4 October 1996	Won
5	102	Shahid Afridi	Pakistan	40	1	Sri Lanka	4 October 1996	Won
6	122	Aravinda de Silva	Sri Lanka	116	2	Pakistan	4 October 1996	Lost
7	118*	Gary Kirsten	South Africa	127	2	Pakistan	6 October 1996	Won
8	122	Dipak Chudasama	Kenya	113	1	Bangladesh	10 October 1997	Won
9	144	Kennedy Otieno	Kenya	146	1	Bangladesh	10 October 1997	Won
10	101*	Lance Klusener	South Africa	105	2	Zimbabwe	28 September 1999	Won
11	139	Sourav Ganguly	India	147	1	Zimbabwe	1 October 1999	Won
12	132	Avishka Gunawardene	Sri Lanka	146	1	West Indies	4 October 2000	Won
13	105*	Saeed Anwar	Pakistan	134	2	Sri Lanka	8 October 2000	Won
14	104	Saeed Anwar	Pakistan	115	1	New Zealand	11 October 2000	Lost
15	141*	Sourav Ganguly	India	142	1	South Africa	13 October 2000	Won
16	117	Sourav Ganguly	India	130	1	New Zealand	15 October 2000	Lost
17	102*	Chris Cairns	New Zealand	113	2	India	15 October 2000	Won
18	146	Matthew Hayden	Australia	128	1	Pakistan	30 August 2002	Won
19	116	Jeremy Bray	Ireland	136	1	Scotland	30 January 2007	Lost
20	100	Neil McCallum	Scotland	92	2	Ireland	30 January 2007	Won
21	104	Darron Reekers	Netherlands	82	1	Ireland	5 February 2007	Won
22	111*	Thomas Odoyo	Kenya	113	2	Canada	18 October 2007	Won
23	102	Steve Tikolo	Kenya	99	1	Zimbabwe	19 October 2008	Won
24	109*	Ryan ten Doeschate	Netherlands	121	1	Kenya	16 February 2010	Lost

== List of five-wicket hauls ==
=== One Day Internationals ===
Five-wicket hauls in Men's One Day Internationals at Gymkhana Club Ground
No.	Bowler	Date	Team	Opposing Team	Inn	O	R	W	Result
1	Allan Donald	3 October 1996	South Africa	Kenya	2	9	23	6	South Africa won
2	Waqar Younis	4 October 1996	Pakistan	Sri Lanka	2	8.5	52	5	Pakistan won
3	Aasif Karim	10 October 1997	Kenya	Bangladesh	2	10	33	5	Kenya won
4	Sunil Joshi	26 September 1999	India	South Africa	1	10	6	5	India won
5	Shayne O'Connor	11 October 2000	New Zealand	Pakistan	1	9.2	46	5	New Zealand won
6	Jason Gillespie	30 August 2002 (Note: This match was part of the PSO Tri-Nation Tournament 2002 played between Australia, Pakistan and Kenya.)	Australia	Pakistan	2	10	22	5	Australia won
7	Jason Gillespie	7 September 2002 (Note: This was the final of the PSO Tri-Nation Tournament 2002.)	Australia	Pakistan	1	10	70	5	No result (Note: Rain meant that it was not possible to complete the match. The title was shared between Australia and Pakistan.)
8	Collins Obuya	24 February 2003 (Note: The match was part of the 2003 Cricket World Cup.)	Kenya	Sri Lanka	2	10	24	5	Kenya won
9	Mashrafe Mortaza	15 August 2006	Bangladesh	Kenya	1	10	26	6	Bangladesh won
10	Chris Mpofu	19 October 2008	Zimbabwe	Kenya	1	10	52	6	Kenya won

=== Twenty20 Internationals ===
Five-wicket hauls in Men's Twenty20 Internationals at Gymkhana Club Ground
No.	Bowler	Date	Team	Opposing Team	Inn	O	R	W	Result
1	Nehemiah Odhiambo	4 February 2010	Kenya	Scotland	1	4	20	5	Kenya won
2	Sandeep Lamichhane	29 August 2022	Nepal	Kenya	1	4	9	5	Kenya won
