= Francis Otieno =

Kenyan cricketer (born 1979)

Personal information
- Full name: Francis Ndege Otieno
- Born: 25 August 1979 (age 47); Nairobi, Kenya
- Batting: Right-handed
- Bowling: Right-arm medium

International information
- National side: Kenya (2010)
- ODI debut (cap 42): 1 July 2010 v Ireland
- Last ODI: 10 July 2010 v Canada

Career statistics
Competition	ODI	FC	LA
Matches	4	5	13
Runs scored	16	29	118
Batting average	4.00	4.14	9.07
100s/50s	0/0	0/0	0/0
Top score	8	8*	35
Balls bowled	6	288	223
Wickets	0	3	4
Bowling average	–	50.00	45.75
5 wickets in innings	–	0	0
10 wickets in match	–	0	0
Best bowling	–	3/78	1/0
Catches/stumpings	2/–	6/–	2/–
- Source: Cricinfo, 10 May 2017

Francis Otieno Ndege (born 25 August 1979) is a former Kenyan international cricketer who played as a right-handed opening batsman. He was born at Nairobi in 1979.

A former captain of the national under-19 side, he represented his country in four One Day International (ODI) matches in 2010, although he had made his senior debut as early as the 1999–2000 season.

Otieno's playing career was interrupted by a stint as the coach of the Ugandan national team. He was appointed to the position in November 2007, replacing Sam Walusimbi, and served until July 2008, when he was replaced by South African Barney Mohamed.
