= Morris Ouma =

Kenyan cricketer

Maurice Ouma
Personal information
- Full name: Maurice Amollo Ouma
- Born: 8 November 1982 (age 44); Kiambu, Kenya
- Nickname: Risse, Pagal
- Batting: Right-handed
- Bowling: Right-arm offbreak
- Role: Wicket-keeper

International information
- National side: Kenya (2004–2014)
- ODI debut (cap 28): 11 September 2004 v India
- Last ODI: 30 January 2014 v Scotland

Career statistics
Competition	ODI	T20I	FC	LA
Matches	80	22	38	114
Runs scored	1,501	127	1,864	2,124
Batting average	20.64	7.05	27.41	20.82
100s/50s	0/7	0/0	3/10	0/10
Top score	61	19	130	69*
Catches/stumpings	48/10	8/5	64/4	73/12
- Source: ESPNcricinfo, 12 May 2017

Maurice Amollo Ouma (first name also spelt Morris) (born 8 November 1982) is a Kenyan cricketer and a former limited over captain. He is a right-handed batsman and also plays as a wicket-keeper. He has played for the Kenyan cricket team since 2000.

== International career ==
Ouma represented Kenya in the Under-19 World Cups of both 2000 and 2002, while maintaining his position at the top of the middle-order. He made his next step up at the ICC Six Nations Challenge, in which Kenya came out victorious in the final in Windhoek. He then played in the 2003 edition of the Sharjah Cup. Around this period, he was described by Hossain Ayob, the African development manager for the ICC, as a star in the making. Ouma was on the losing Kenyan side in the 2005 ICC Intercontinental Cup final, who stumbled in the second innings despite first-innings centuries from Steve Tikolo and Hitesh Modi.

Most recently, Ouma participated in a three-game ODI series against Bangladesh in August 2006. Ouma has progressively made his way up from being a lower-middle order batsman to an opening batsman, particularly strong against smaller nations such as the young Bangladesh squad.
