= Tom Tikolo =

Kenyan cricketer and administrator

Personal information
- Full name: Tom Jones Tikolo
- Born: 24 October 1961 (age 65); Kakamega, Western Province, Kenya
- Batting: Right-handed

International information
- National side: Kenya

Career statistics
Competition	FC	ICC Trophy
Matches	1	22
Runs scored	87	378
Batting average	43.50	27.00
100s/50s	0/1	0/0
Top score	79	48
Balls bowled	6	66
Wickets	0	1
Bowling average	–	49.00
5 wickets in innings	–	0
10 wickets in match	–	0
Best bowling	–	1/34
Catches/stumpings	0/–	11/–
- Source: Cricinfo, 22 December 2009

Tom Jones Tikolo (born 24 October 1961) is a Kenyan former cricketer. He captained Kenya in 22 ICC Trophy games, more than any other player. Despite that, he only played in one first class match, although he did well, scoring 79 in one innings. After ending his playing career, Tikolo became the development officer for East Africa. In 2005, he was named the new CEO of Cricket Kenya and also as a national selector. Tikolo is the brother of cricketers David and Steve Tikolo.

A batting all-rounder who played locally for the Swamibapa Cricket Club, he was the youngest ever captain of the Kenya cricket team when appointed in 1986, aged 24. He was also the first African player to captain the team, with previous captains being either European or Indian.
