= Tariq Iqbal =

Kenyan cricketer (born 1964)

Personal information
- Full name: Tariq Iqbal
- Born: 3 April 1964 (age 62); Nairobi, Kenya
- Batting: Right-handed
- Bowling: Wicketkeeper

International information
- National side: Kenya (1996)
- ODI debut (cap 12): 26 February 1996 v Zimbabwe
- Last ODI: 29 February 1996 v West Indies

Career statistics
Competition	ODI
Matches	3
Runs scored	17
Batting average	8.50
100s/50s	0/0
Top score	16
Catches/stumpings	2/0
- Source: Cricinfo, 13 May 2017

Tariq Iqbal (born 1964) is a former Kenyan cricketer. He has played three One Day International matches for Kenya. He was born at Nairobi in 1964.

His last game was their famous victory over the West Indies in the 1996 World Cup, in which he played as wicket-keeper and caught Brian Lara, which remains his "claim to eternal fame". Before Lara's dismissal he had conceded byes and missed a catch down the leg side. Later in the innings he also caught Roger Harper.
