= Edward Odumbe =

Kenyan cricketer (born 1965)

Personal information
- Full name: Edward Oluoch Odumbe
- Born: 19 May 1965 (age 61); Kendu Bay, Kenya
- Batting: Right-handed
- Bowling: Right-arm medium

International information
- National side: Kenya (1996)
- ODI debut (cap 6): 18 February 1996 v India
- Last ODI: 2 October 1996 v Pakistan

Career statistics
Competition	ODI
Matches	8
Runs scored	61
Batting average	10.16
100s/50s	0/0
Top score	20
Balls bowled	137
Wickets	6
Bowling average	22.83
5 wickets in innings	0
10 wickets in match	0
Best bowling	2/8
Catches/stumpings	4/–
- Source: Cricinfo, 14 May 2017

Edward Oluoch 'Tito' Odumbe (born 19 May 1965) is a former Kenyan cricketer. He played eight One Day Internationals for Kenya (including some games at the 1996 Cricket World Cup alongside his brother Maurice). He was born at Kendu Bay. He currently works in the United States as the manager of the Rajasthan Royals Cricket Academy and is the current Head Coach of the West Windsor-Plainsboro High School South. Where he is referred to as Coach 'Tito'.
