= Sandip Gupta =

Kenyan cricketer (born 1967)

Sandeep Gupta
Personal information
- Full name: Sandeep Kumar Gupta
- Born: 7 April 1967 (age 59); Nairobi, Kenya
- Batting: Right-handed
- Bowling: Wicketkeeper

International information
- National side: Kenya (1996–2001)
- ODI debut (cap 14): 28 September 1996 v Sri Lanka
- Last ODI: 17 October 2001 v India

Career statistics
Competition	ODI	FC	LA
Matches	10	1	11
Runs scored	121	18	125
Batting average	13.44	18.00	12.50
100s/50s	0/0	0/0	0/0
Top score	41	18	41
Catches/stumpings	0/0	0/0	0/0
- Source: ESPNcricinfo, 11 May 2017

Sandip Gupta (also Sandeep Gupta; born 7 April 1967) is a former Kenyan cricketer who represented his country in 10 One Day Internationals between 1996 and 2001. He is a right-handed batsman and wicket-keeper who played for Nairobi Gymkhana at club level.

Gupta made his One Day International debut against Sri Lanka during the Sameer Cup 1996–97, batting at number 3 he scored 41 off 66 balls. He took part in the 1999 Meril International Tournament, where he helped the Kenyan team to the final where they lost by 202 runs against Zimbabwe, in a game where the man-of-the-match Grant Flower scored 140 runs. He was part of the Kenya squad for the 1999 World Cup, playing in two of Kenya's five group matches, he was dismissed for a golden duck against India and scored one against South Africa.
