= Alpesh Vadher =

Kenyan cricketer (born 1974)

Personal information
- Full name: Alpesh Vallabhdas Vadher
- Born: 7 September 1974 (age 52); Nairobi, Kenya
- Batting: Right-handed
- Role: Batsman

International information
- National side: Kenya (1997–1999)
- ODI debut (cap 17): 10 October 1997 v Bangladesh
- Last ODI: 30 September 1999 v South Africa

Career statistics
Competition	ODI	FC	LA
Matches	18	2	30
Runs scored	278	19	334
Batting average	27.80	6.33	19.64
100s/50s	0/2	0/0	0/2
Top score	73*	13	73*
Catches/stumpings	6/0	0/0	8/0
- Source: Cricinfo, 11 May 2017

Alpesh Vallabhdas Vadher (born 7 September 1974) is a former Kenyan cricketer of Indian origin. He is a right-handed batsman.

Having made 42 on his debut against Bangladesh in 1997, he did little more until the 1999 Cricket World Cup, in which he made two fifties, including an unbeaten 73 against Sri Lanka.

He retired in the year 2000, but was called back by the team in time for the 2003 Cricket World Cup along with Aasif Karim, the former Kenyan captain.

He retired for a second and final time following the close of the World Cup.

== After cricket ==
After leaving cricket he married Shital Vadher, and is currently working for PKF in Kenya where he is a partner.

In 2012, Vadher was appointed as the chairman of their newly constituted selection panel by Cricket Kenya.
