= Ravindu Shah =

Kenyan cricketer (born 1972)

Personal information
- Full name: Ravindu Dhirajlal Shah
- Born: 28 August 1972 (age 54); Nairobi, Kenya
- Batting: Right-handed
- Bowling: Right-arm medium-fast
- Role: Batsman

International information
- National side: Kenya (1998–2007)
- ODI debut (cap 19): 17 May 1998 v Bangladesh
- Last ODI: 24 May 2007 v England

Career statistics
Competition	ODI	FC	LA
Matches	56	21	102
Runs scored	1,506	1,623	2,853
Batting average	27.88	49.18	29.11
100s/50s	1/12	5/4	4/16
Top score	113	247	132
Balls bowled	60	248	126
Wickets	0	5	1
Bowling average	–	33.60	99.00
5 wickets in innings	0	0	0
10 wickets in match	0	0	0
Best bowling	–	2/50	1/24
Catches/stumpings	16/–	15/–	34/–
- Source: Cricinfo, 11 May 2017

Ravindu Dhirajlal Shah (born 28 August 1972) is a Kenyan former cricketer. He was a right-handed batsman. He was part of Kenya's 1999, 2003 and 2007 World Cup squads.

== Domestic career ==
Shah played 56 One-day Internationals for Kenya and also appeared in first-class and List A cricket for Kenya. Shah went to Visa Oshwal Primary School in Parklands, Nairobi and was on the school's cricket team.

== International career ==
He made his ODI debut with 52 against Bangladesh at Hyderabad in the Coca-Cola Triangular Series in 1998. He scored his maiden ODI hundred, 113, against Scotland in Mombasa in 2007. He also made 71 against New Zealand in the 2007 World Cup.

In Kenya's 2003 ICC Cricket World Cup campaign, he scored half-centuries against South Africa and Canada in the group stage. He also scored 34 and 46 in the Super Six and semi-final matches, respectively, both against India.
