= Joseph Angara =

Kenyan cricketer (born 1971)

Personal information
- Full name: Joseph Oduol Angara
- Born: 8 November 1971 (age 55); Nairobi, Kenya
- Batting: Right-handed
- Bowling: Right-arm medium-fast

International information
- National side: Kenya (1997–2003)
- ODI debut (cap 18): 19 October 1997 v Zimbabwe
- Last ODI: 8 April 2003 v Pakistan

Career statistics
Competition	ODI	FC	LA
Matches	17	7	36
Runs scored	23	53	71
Batting average	3.83	10.60	6.45
100s/50s	0/0	0/0	0/0
Top score	6	24	24
Balls bowled	588	564	1,215
Wickets	14	5	32
Bowling average	40.64	58.60	35.56
5 wickets in innings	0	0	1
10 wickets in match	0	0	0
Best bowling	3/30	3/30	7/22
Catches/stumpings	2/–	3/–	9/–
- Source: ESPNcricinfo, 11 May 2017

Joseph Oduol Angara (born 8 November 1971) is a Kenyan former cricketer who played One Day Internationals for Kenyan national team between 1997 and 2003, including at the 1999 and 2003 World Cups.

== Career ==
=== As player ===
One of Angara's best performances in ODIs came at the 2001 tri-series in South Africa. In the sixth match of the series, he returned figures of 3/30, helping his team defeat India by 70 runs. Playing his first game of the series, Angara bowled four maiden overs in his first spell, while claiming the wicket of Sachin Tendulkar, bowling him out for 3. He was named player of the match.

=== As coach ===
Angara was appointed coach of the Botswana national cricket team in July 2015. He had earlier coached the Botswana national under-19 side at the 2015 Africa Under-19 Championship, and previously worked as a development coach with Cricket Kenya, which included coaching a Sahara Elite League franchise, the Northern Nomads. His contract as Botswana head coach ended in 2023.
