= Rajab Ali =

Kenyan cricketer (born 1965)

Personal information
- Full name: Rajab Wazir Ali
- Born: 19 November 1965 (age 60); Nairobi, Kenya
- Batting: Right-handed
- Bowling: Right-arm medium-fast

International information
- National side: Kenya (1996–1997)
- ODI debut (cap 1): 18 February 1996 v India
- Last ODI: 12 October 1997 v Zimbabwe

Career statistics
Competition	ODI
Matches	9
Runs scored	7
Batting average	–
100s/50s	0/0
Top score	6*
Balls bowled	338
Wickets	11
Bowling average	23.18
5 wickets in innings	0
10 wickets in match	0
Best bowling	3/17
Catches/stumpings	1/–
- Source: Cricinfo, 14 May 2017

Rajab Wazir Ali (born 19 November 1965) is a Kenyan former cricketer. He has played nine One Day International for Kenya. He was the first ODI cap for Kenya.

He was the first-choice opening bowler for Kenya for a number of years.
