= Collins Obuya =

Kenyan cricketer

Personal information
- Full name: Collins Omondi Obuya
- Born: 27 July 1981 (age 45); Nairobi, Kenya
- Batting: Right-handed
- Bowling: Leg break
- Role: All-rounder
- Relatives: David Obuya (brother); Kennedy Otieno (brother)

International information
- National side: Kenya (2001–2024)
- ODI debut (cap 23): 15 August 2001 v West Indies
- Last ODI: 30 January 2014 v Scotland
- T20I debut (cap 5): 1 September 2007 v Bangladesh
- Last T20I: 23 March 2024 v Uganda

Domestic team information
- Years: Team
- 2003: Warwickshire
- 2006/07: Kenya Select

Career statistics
| Competition | ODI | T20I | FC | LA |
|---|---|---|---|---|
| Matches | 104 | 76 | 52 | 200 |
| Runs scored | 2,044 | 1,794 | 2,378 | 4,032 |
| Batting average | 25.55 | 30.40 | 30.48 | 26.35 |
| 100s/50s | 0/11 | 0/10 | 2/14 | 2/21 |
| Top score | 98* | 96* | 103 | 106 |
| Balls bowled | 1,818 | 422 | 4,185 | 3,617 |
| Wickets | 35 | 25 | 68 | 86 |
| Bowling average | 46.77 | 19.48 | 38.39 | 36.61 |
| 5 wickets in innings | 1 | 0 | 1 | 1 |
| 10 wickets in match | 0 | 0 | 0 | 0 |
| Best bowling | 5/24 | 4/27 | 5/97 | 5/24 |
| Catches/stumpings | 43/0 | 37/0 | 36/0 | 87/0 |
- Source: ESPNcricinfo, 25 March 2024

Collins Omondi Obuya (born 27 July 1981) is a former Kenyan cricketer and captain of the Kenyan cricket team. An allrounder, Obuya bats right-handed and bowls leg spin. He came to prominence in the 2003 Cricket World Cup where he was one of Kenya's major performers as they reached the semi-finals. Obuya has a highest first class score of 103. He has been a prominent member of the Kenya cricket team with a career spanning more than two decades, since making his international debut in 2001. On 24 March 2024 he announced his retirement from international cricket. His final game was the bronze medal match at the African Games in Accra, Ghana.

His brothers Kennedy Otieno and David Obuya were also professional cricketers who also went on to represent Kenya at the international level. He was part of Kenya's first T20I team as well as Kenya's first T20 World Cup team.

== Biography ==
Obuya used to sell tomatoes at his mother's market to make a living and earned most of his income that way before the 2003 World Cup. He started his cricket career initially as a medium pacer but switched to spin bowling after watching the bowling action of former veteran Pakistani spinner Mushtaq Ahmed as a kid during the 1996 Cricket World Cup. He also intended to become a doctor initially when he was quoted by the BBC Sport in 2003.

== Domestic career ==
His success in the competition persuaded Warwickshire to offer him a one-year contract to play county cricket in England in the 2003 season following his breathtaking performances at the 2003 World Cup. The stint was overall an unsuccessful one, although he scored a 50 on his Championship debut and participated in half a dozen Twenty20 cricket games. He made his T20 debut on 13 June 2003 against Somerset.

His season with Warwickshire preceded a downhill drop in Obuya's career. His county stint had not lasted long after he suffered a knee injury. He also suffered from appendicitis and thus missed the 2004 ICC Champions Trophy. Soon after, he joined a players' strike and left England to go to South Africa. Due mainly to lack of match practice, Obuya began to struggle with his bowling, and in November 2005, he travelled to Australia to train with spin-bowling coach Terry Jenner. The five-week trip was not successful, and as a result, Obuya decided to develop his batting so that he could play as a specialist batsman instead. He joined the Weymouth club in 2005 for the Dorset Premier Division and rejoined the Weymouth club in 2007.

== International career ==
Obuya represented Kenya at Under-19 level and played for Kenya in the 1998 Under-19 Cricket World Cup and 2000 Under-19 Cricket World Cup. He was also taught spin bowling by the then head coach of Kenya Under19 side Balwinder Sandhu during the U19 World Cup tournaments. He was later picked in the Kenyan senior squad.

He made his ODI debut on 15 August 2001 against the West Indies. He was included in the Kenyan squad for the 2003 Cricket World Cup whereas Kenya also hosted a few matches during the course of the tournament. He subsequently made his debut World Cup appearance during the tournament. He picked up 13 wickets at a decent average of 28.76 in the 2003 World Cup and took a career best 5 for 24 in Kenya's win over Sri Lanka at Nairobi, their first victory over Sri Lanka in ODIs. Kenya's dramatic victory over Sri Lanka was considered a massive upset in world cricket and Kenya subsequently reached semifinals of the tournament. His 5/24 remains the best bowling performance for Kenya in World Cups and he was awarded the man of the match for his match-winning performance. During the 2003 World Cup campaign, he received advice and bowling tips from Australian leg spinner Shane Warne. However, Kenyan cricket team quickly faded away following the successful 2003 World Cup.

He was later snubbed from the team due to his inconsistent performances and toured Australia in 2005 to work on his bowling skills. He was recalled to the side in 2006 for a four match ODI series against Bangladesh in Bangladesh. He along with his brother David signed a sponsorship deal with Kenya-based office equipment supplier CopyCat prior to the 2007 Cricket World Cup, at a time when the national team itself did not have an official sponsor. He made his T20I debut on 1 September 2007 against Bangladesh during the 2007 Kenya Twenty20 Quadrangular tournament. His debut came in Kenya's inaugural T20I match and also marked Bangladesh's first T20I match. He was also picked for the inaugural edition of the ICC Men's T20 World Cup in 2007 which was held in South Africa.

His finest ODI innings to date has been an unbeaten 98 against Australia at the 2011 ICC World Cup despite being ended up in a losing cause. The innings cited as one of the best ODI innings by a Kenyan against a leading cricketing nation. He was also the leading run scorer for Kenya during the 2011 World Cup as he ended up with 243 runs in six matches at a stellar average of 48.60 including two half-centuries. In July 2011, he was appointed as the captain of the Kenyan cricket team replacing Jimmy Kamande following the dismal 2011 World Cup campaign for Kenya. Cricket Kenya suspended him for two warmup matches ahead of the 2013 ICC World Twenty20 Qualifier after an altercation with his teammate Irfan Karim. In December 2013, he resigned as the captain of the Kenyan cricket team after Kenya failed to qualify for the 2014 ICC World Twenty20.

In January 2018, he was named in Kenya's squad for the 2018 ICC World Cricket League Division Two tournament. In September 2018, he was named in Kenya's squad for the 2018 Africa T20 Cup. In October 2018, he was named as the captain of Kenya's squad for the 2018 ICC World Cricket League Division Three tournament in Oman. Ahead of the tournament, Obuya was ruled out of Kenya's squad due to personal commitments. He was replaced by Narendra Kalyan, with Shem Ngoche was named captain of the team.

In May 2019, he was named in Kenya's squad for the Regional Finals of the 2018–19 ICC T20 World Cup Africa Qualifier tournament in Uganda. In September 2019, he was named in Kenya's squad for the 2019 ICC T20 World Cup Qualifier tournament in the United Arab Emirates. Ahead of the tournament, the International Cricket Council (ICC) named him as the key player in Kenya's squad. He was the leading wicket-taker for Kenya in the tournament, with eleven dismissals in six matches. In November 2019, he was named in Kenya's squad for the Cricket World Cup Challenge League B tournament in Oman.

In October 2021, he was named in Kenya's squad for the Regional Final of the 2021 ICC Men's T20 World Cup Africa Qualifier tournament in Rwanda.
