= List of Kenya ODI cricketers =

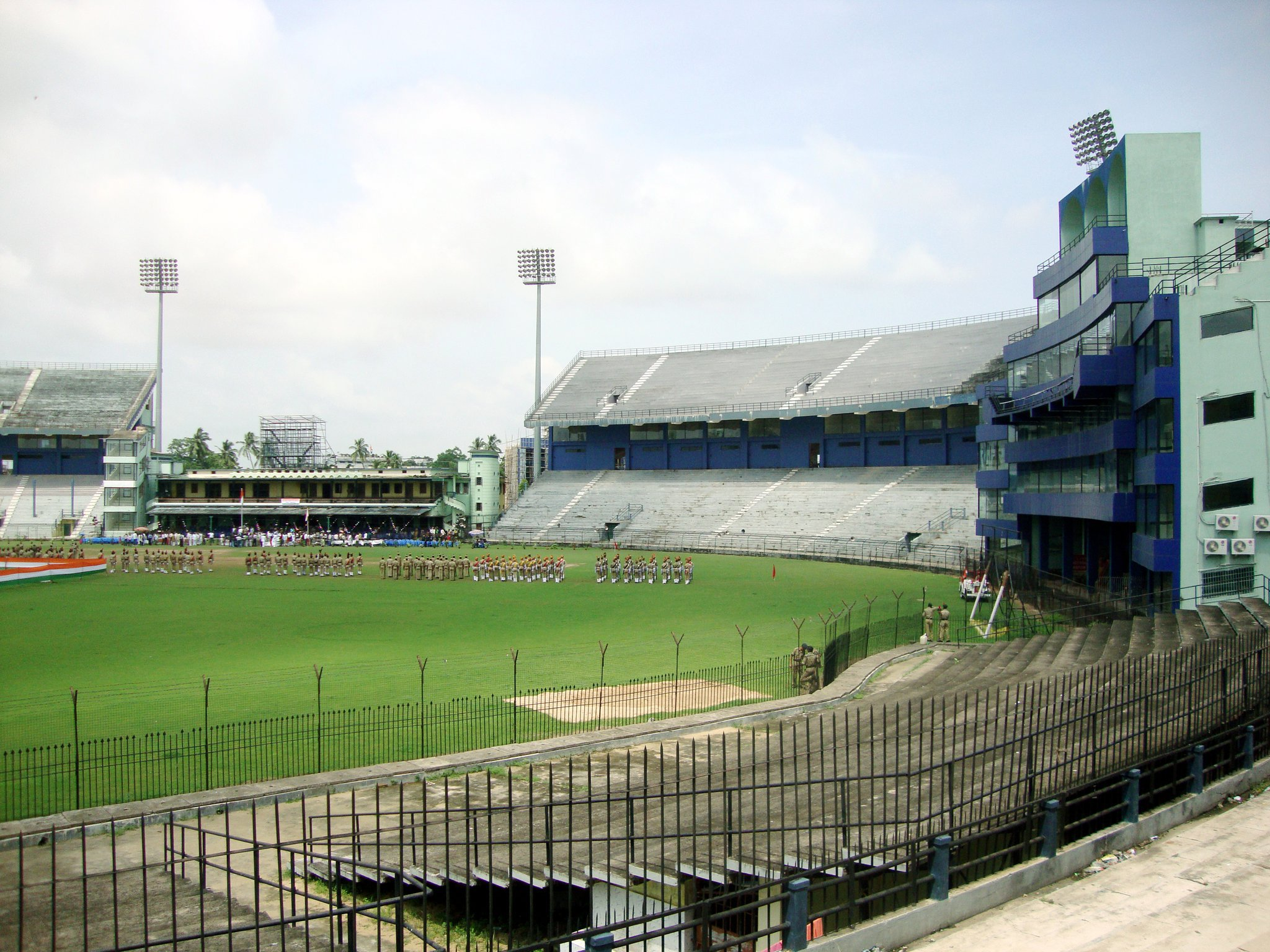
Kenya played its first ODI against India at the Barabati Stadium (pictured), in the 1996 Cricket World Cup in India.

A One Day International (ODI) is a 50 over cricket match between two representative teams, each having ODI status, as determined by the International Cricket Council (ICC). An ODI differs from Test matches in that the number of overs per side is limited, and that each team has only one innings. As of November 2016, 50 players have represented the Kenyan national team in ODIs, since its debut in 1996.

Kenya gained ODI status in its own right following a strong performance in the 1996 World Cup, a competition they qualified for by gaining a second-placed finish in the 1994 ICC Trophy. The team's first ODI came against India in the 1996 World Cup, a competition for which Kenya was given temporary ODI status, (Note: The ICC considers any match at a World Cup an ODI match.) with the team then playing four further matches in the competition. Kenya's first ODI win came in their fourth World Cup match against the West Indies. The Kenyans won the game by 73 runs but ultimately finished last in group A. Kenya have since qualified for four more Cricket World Cups. They reached the group stage in the 1999 competition, the 2007 competition and the 2011 competition. At the 2003 Cricket World Cup, partly hosted in Kenya, the Kenyan team finished second in their group and in doing so qualified for the Super Sixes stage. Kenya finished third in the Super Sixes stage and qualified for the semi-finals where they lost to India by 91 runs. The Kenyan team have played 154 ODI games with the most recent coming in 2014. Thomas Odoyo and Steve Tikolo have played the most ODIs for Kenya with 131 each. Tikolo has scored the most runs with 3369 for the team while Odoyo has taken the most wickets with 141.

== Key ==
General

- ‡ – Captain
- † – Wicket-keeper
- First – Year of debut
- Last – Year of latest game
- Mat – Number of matches played

Batting

- Runs – Runs scored in career
- HS – Highest score
- Avg – Runs scored per dismissal
- * – Batsman remained not out

Bowling

- Wkt – Wickets taken in career
- BBI – Best bowling in an innings
- Ave – Average runs per wicket

Fielding

- Ca – Catches taken
- St – Stumpings affected

== List of players ==
Last updated 30 January 2014, the date of Kenya's last ODI. This list includes all players who have played at least one ODI match and is initially arranged in the order of debut appearance. Where more than one player won their first cap in the same match, those players are initially listed alphabetically.

Kenya ODI cricketers
General					Batting			Bowling			Fielding		Ref
No.	Name	First	Last	Mat	Runs	HS	Avg	Wkt	BBI	Ave	Ca	St	Ref
1	Rajab Ali	1996	1997	9	7	6*	–	11	3/17	23.18	1	0	
2	Dipak Chudasama	1996	1999	20	434	122	22.84	–	–	–	4	0	
3	Aasif Karim ‡	1996	2003	34	228	53	12.66	27	5/33	41.25	6	0	
4	Hitesh Modi	1996	2006	63	1109	78*	23.59	–	–	–	12	0	
5	Thomas Odoyo ‡	1996	2014	131	2366	111*	23.19	141	4/25	29.63	28	0	(Note: Player has also played One Day International cricket for Africa XI. Only his record for Kenya is given above.)
6	Edward Odumbe	1996	1996	8	61	20	10.16	6	2/8	22.83	4	0	
7	Maurice Odumbe ‡	1996	2003	61	1409	83	26.09	39	4/38	46.33	12	0	
8	Kennedy Otieno †	1996	2009	90	2016	144	23.44	0	–	–	43	14	
9	Martin Suji	1996	2006	64	247	16*	8.23	43	4/24	50.93	11	0	
10	David Tikolo	1996	1996	3	36	25*	–	0	–	–	2	0	
11	Steve Tikolo ‡	1996	2014	131	3369	111	29.55	93	4/41	33.40	66	0	
12	Tariq Iqbal †	1996	1996	3	17	16	35.42	–	–	–	2	0	
13	Lameck Onyango	1996	2014	29	144	34*	13.09	26	3/29	37.73	3	0	
14	Sandip Gupta	1996	2001	10	121	41	13.44	–	–	–	0	0	
15	Tony Suji	1996	2008	60	506	67	12.97	21	2/14	55.95	19	0	
16	Mohammad Sheikh	1997	2000	21	68	15*	6.80	19	4/36	32.89	7	0	
17	Alpesh Vadher	1997	1998	18	278	73*	27.80	–	–	–	6	0	
18	Joseph Angara	1997	2003	17	23	6	3.83	14	3/30	40.64	2	0	
19	Ravindu Shah	1998	2007	56	1506	113	27.88	0	–	–	16	0	
20	Jimmy Kamande ‡	1999	2011	86	1055	74	17.29	48	4/36	45.18	20	0	
21	Josephat Ababu	1999	2006	9	29	17	9.66	3	1/26	85.00	1	0	
22	Peter Ongondo	1999	2011	78	391	36	9.09	75	5/51	30.86	17	0	
23	Collins Obuya ‡	2001	2014	104	2044	93	19.35	35	5/24	46.77	43	0	
24	David Obuya †	2001	2012	74	1355	22*	20.00	–	–	–	39	5	
25	Brijal Patel	2001	2006	31	360	44	16.36	4	2/20	40.75	7	0	
26	Alfred Luseno	2003	2010	10	34	16*	17.00	9	4/32	35.11	1	0	
27	Rageb Aga	2004	2014	12	150	86	16.66	8	2/17	40.00	3	0	
28	Morris Ouma †‡	2004	2014	80	1501	61	20.84	–	–	–	48	10	
29	Malhar Patel	2004	2006	3	40	25	13.33	–	–	–	0	0	
30	Tanmay Mishra	2006	2013	42	1128	72	34.18	1	1/6	12.00	16	0	
31	Nehemiah Odhiambo	2006	2014	69	528	66	12.00	70	4/61	36.92	7	0	
32	Kalpesh Patel	2006	2006	2	1	1*	1.00	0	–	–	0	0	
33	Hiren Varaiya	2006	2014	63	252	34	12.00	68	4/25	30.11	15	0	
34	Alex Obanda	2007	2014	49	1306	96*	30.37	–	–	–	15	0	
35	Elijah Otieno	2007	2014	26	49	11	4.90	22	4/33	42.13	7	0	
36	Rakep Patel †‡	2008	2014	39	621	92	20.03	2	1/14	67.50	18	0	
37	Rajesh Bhudia	2008	2009	5	122	47	24.40	3	2/42	50.33	2	0	
38	Seren Waters	2008	2011	20	419	74	20.95	0	–	–	5	0	
39	Shem Ngoche	2010	2014	14	68	28	7.55	12	2/28	35.91	0	0	
40	Nelson Odhiambo	2010	2013	8	56	29	9.33	8	3/48	32.00	1	0	
41	James Ngoche	2010	2013	17	35	21*	5.00	20	3/18	28.45	6	0	
42	Francis Otieno	2010	2010	4	16	8	4.00	0	–	–	2	0	
43	Dominic Wesonga	2010	2011	4	61	33	20.33	2	2/28	14.00	3	0	
44	Duncan Allan	2011	2013	5	71	27	14.20	2	1/22	40.00	1	0	
45	Runish Gudhka	2011	2011	2	17	10	17.00	1	1/41	60.00	0	0	
46	Irfan Karim †	2011	2014	9	396	112	44.00	–	–	–	8	1	
47	Lucas Oluoch	2011	2011	2	6	5*	6.00	5	3/41	15.80	1	0	
48	Emmanuel Bundi	2011	2011	1	–	–	–	0	–	–	0	0	
49	Dhiren Gondaria	2013	2013	2	7	6	3.50	–	–	–	2	0	
50	Gurdeep Singh	2013	2013	1	1	1	1.00	–	–	–	0	0	

== See also ==
- List of Kenya Twenty20 International cricketers
