= Thomas Odoyo =

Kenyan cricketer

Personal information
- Full name: Thomas Odoyo Migai
- Born: 12 May 1978 (age 48); Nairobi, Kenya
- Batting: Right-handed
- Bowling: Right arm medium-fast
- Role: All-rounder
- Relatives: Ken Migai (brother); Nelson Odhiambo (nephew)

International information
- National side: Kenya (1996–2014)
- ODI debut (cap 5): 18 February 1996 v India
- Last ODI: 30 January 2014 v Scotland
- ODI shirt no.: 55
- T20I debut (cap 7): 1 September 2007 v Bangladesh
- Last T20I: 24 November 2013 v Afghanistan
- T20I shirt no.: 55

Domestic team information
- Years: Team
- 2008–2009: The Northern Nomads
- 2009/10: Southern Rocks

Career statistics
Competition	ODI	T20I	FC	LA
Matches	136	11	41	203
Runs scored	2,420	95	1,525	3,772
Batting average	23.49	9.50	26.75	25.14
100s/50s	1/8	0/0	2/8	1/17
Top score	111*	22	137	111*
Balls bowled	5,649	216	4,475	8,092
Wickets	145	11	87	216
Bowling average	29.89	15.45	25.37	28.27
5 wickets in innings	0	0	3	1
10 wickets in match	0	0	0	0
Best bowling	4/25	3/17	5/21	5/27
Catches/stumpings	28/–	5/–	13/–	46/–
- Source: Cricinfo, 11 May 2017

Thomas Odoyo Migai (born 12 May 1978) is a Kenyan former cricketer and a former One Day International (ODI) captain. He is a right-handed batsman and a right-handed medium-fast bowler, often regarded as the best bowler produced by Kenya in the international arena.

== International career ==
Having represented Kenya in the 1996 World Cup, Odoyo's performances have since been critical to the team. His powerful batting throughout the middle-order and his seam bowling have led to Kenyan commentators labelling him the "Black Botham". Odoyo formed a bowling partnership with Martin Suji, and in 1997–98 set a then-world record ODI seventh-wicket stand of 119 with Suji's brother Tony.

He was the first player from a non-Test nation to score 1,500 runs and take 100 wickets in ODIs. Though injury forced him out of the Carib Beer Cup in 2003–04, he played once again for the 2004 ICC Champions Trophy

Odoyo performed well in Kenya's tour of Zimbabwe in 2006. He scored a few runs and took 8 wickets in 4 matches as Kenya drew the series 2–2 with Zimbabwe. Odoyo was selected as captain of The Northern Nomads franchise in Kenya's domestic cricket competition the Sahara Elite League.

== Coaching career ==
Odoyo was appointed the national cricket team's assistant coach under Robin Brown as well as head coach of Kenya national under-19 cricket team in September 2012.

In March 2016, Odoyo was named the interim head coach of Kenya national cricket team replacing Sibtain Kassamali. His support squad included former teammate Lameck Onyango

In February 2018, Kenya finished in the sixth and last place in the 2018 ICC World Cricket League Division Two tournament and were relegated to Division Three. As a result, Odoyo resigned as coach of the Kenyan team.
