= Mohammad Sheikh =

Kenyan cricketer (born 1980)

Personal information
- Full name: Mohammad Sheikh
- Born: 29 August 1980 (age 46); Nairobi, Kenya
- Batting: Left-handed
- Bowling: Slow Left arm Orthodox
- Role: Bowler

International information
- National side: Kenya (1997–2000)
- ODI debut (cap 16): 10 October 1997 v Bangladesh
- Last ODI: 3 October 2000 v India

Career statistics
Competition	ODI	FC	LA
Matches	21	7	30
Runs scored	68	54	86
Batting average	6.80	5.40	6.14
100s/50s	0/0	0/0	0/0
Top score	15*	10*	15*
Balls bowled	778	742	1,175
Wickets	19	11	35
Bowling average	32.89	45.90	26.34
5 wickets in innings	0	0	0
10 wickets in match	0	0	0
Best bowling	32.89	3/20	4/36
Catches/stumpings	7/0	2/0	9/0
- Source: Cricinfo, 11 May 2017

Mohammad Sheikh (born 29 August 1980) is a former Kenyan cricketer who has played One-Day Internationals and first-class cricket for the Kenyan national side. He is a left-handed batsman and a slow left arm orthodox bowler.

Sheikh took part in the senior Cricket World Cup of 1999, while just eighteen and still at school, and, the following year, took part in the Under-19s Cricket World Cup. He has since visited England to play in Hertfordshire. Presently he is living in South Australia and plays for the Payneham Cricket Club.

Sheikh did not play any cricket since 2005.
