= Hitesh Modi =

Kenyan cricketer (born 1971)

Personal information
- Full name: Hitesh Subhash Modi
- Born: 13 October 1971 (age 55); Kisumu, Kenya
- Batting: Left-handed
- Bowling: Right-arm offbreak
- Role: Batsman

International information
- National side: Kenya (1996–2006)
- ODI debut (cap 4): 18 February 1996 v India
- Last ODI: 13 August 2006 v Bangladesh

Career statistics
Competition	ODI	FC	LA
Matches	63	25	97
Runs scored	1,109	1,224	1,882
Batting average	22.59	31.38	25.78
100s/50s	0/5	1/9	0/9
Top score	78*	106	78*
Balls bowled	19	231	67
Wickets	0	2	1
Bowling average	–	80.00	84.00
5 wickets in innings	–	0	0
10 wickets in match	–	0	0
Best bowling	–	2/41	1/27
Catches/stumpings	12/–	5/–	20/–
- Source: Cricinfo, 5 May 2017

Hitesh Subhash Modi (born 13 October 1971) is a former Kenyan cricketer. He was a left-handed batsman and a right-arm offbreak bowler.

== International career ==
Having made his One Day International (ODI) debut in 1992, Modi became part of the middle order of the team, as well as being involved in the 1996, 1999 and 2003 Cricket World Cups and the 1994 and 1997 ICC Trophy. Having seen several players fall by the wayside due to disagreements over contracts, including Steve Tikolo, Modi was appointed as captain in 2004.

== Family ==
Modi's father is Subhash Modi, and the pair are unique as the only father/son pair to appear as batsman and umpire in the same ODI. Against Bangladesh at Nairobi in August 2006, father gave son out lbw.
