= Martin Suji =

Kenyan cricketer (born 1971)

Personal information
- Full name: Martin Armon Suji
- Born: 2 June 1971 (age 55); Nairobi, Kenya
- Batting: Right-handed
- Bowling: Right-arm medium-fast
- Role: Bowler
- Relatives: Tony Suji (brother)

International information
- National side: Kenya (1990–2006)
- ODI debut (cap 9): 18 February 1996 v India
- Last ODI: 23 March 2006 v Bangladesh

Head coaching information
- Years: Team
- 2011–2013: Uganda
- 2018–present: Rwanda

Career statistics
Competition	ODI	FC	LA
Matches	64	23	107
Runs scored	247	626	4,873
Batting average	8.23	25.04	10.54
100s/50s	0/0	0/3	0/0
Top score	16*	72*	49*
Balls bowled	2,952	2,420	4,873
Wickets	43	25	89
Bowling average	50.93	45.28	38.89
5 wickets in innings	0	0	0
10 wickets in match	0	0	0
Best bowling	4/24	4/23	4/22
Catches/stumpings	11/–	9/–	20/–
- Source: Cricinfo, 11 May 2017

Martin Armon Suji (born 2 June 1971) is a Kenyan former cricketer who played One-Day Internationals for the Kenyan national side between 1996 and 2006.

A right-handed batsman and a right-arm medium-fast bowler, his international career included matches at the 1996, 1999, and 2003 World Cups, as well as at the 1990, 1994, and 1997 ICC Trophies.

Suji is the older brother of Tony Suji, who also had a long career for Kenya. The brothers played together at the 1999 and 2003 World Cups.

== Coaching career ==
Following the departure of Roger Harper after the 2007 ICC World Twenty20, Suji was made assistant coach of the national team, assisting the caretaker Alfred Njuguna (later replaced by Andy Kirsten as full time coach in May 2008). In February 2011, he was appointed senior coach of the Ugandan national team, replacing South African Shukri Conrad.

He remained in the role until May 2013, and oversaw the team at several major tournaments, including the 2011 WCL Division Two, the 2013 Division Two tournaments, and the 2012 World Twenty20 Qualifier. One of Suji's assistant coaches at Uganda was Steve Tikolo, his former teammate.

In March 2018, Suji was appointed head coach of the Rwanda national cricket team on an initial four-month contract, encompassing the 2018–19 ICC World Twenty20 Africa Qualifier Eastern Sub-region tournament.
