= Tony Suji =

Kenyan cricketer (born 1976)

Personal information
- Full name: Otieno Suji Ondik
- Born: 5 February 1976 (age 50); Nairobi, Kenya
- Batting: Right-handed
- Bowling: Right arm medium
- Role: All-rounder
- Relatives: Martin Suji (brother)

International information
- National side: Kenya (1996-2010)
- ODI debut (cap 15): 2 October 1996 v Pakistan
- Last ODI: 25 August 2008 v Ireland
- T20I debut (cap 13): 4 September 2007 v Pakistan
- Last T20I: 11 February 2010 v Netherlands

Domestic team information
- Years: Team
- 2006/07: Kenya Select
- Aga Khan Sports Club

Career statistics
Competition	ODI	T20I	FC	LA
Matches	60	8	26	92
Runs scored	506	15	574	699
Batting average	12.97	5.00	15.10	12.26
100s/50s	0/1	0/0	1/1	0/1
Top score	67	7	103*	67
Balls bowled	1,295	97	1,340	2,241
Wickets	21	4	17	39
Bowling average	55.95	29.00	47.05	48.20
5 wickets in innings	0	0	0	0
10 wickets in match	0	0	0	0
Best bowling	2/14	2/23	4/62	4/36
Catches/stumpings	19/–	3/–	12/–	25/–
- Source: Cricinfo, 11 May 2017

Anthony Suji (born Otieno Suji Ondik; 5 February 1976) is a Kenyan former cricketer. He is a right-handed batsman and a right-arm medium-fast bowler. His brother Martin Suji is also a former member of the Kenyan national team. Anthony has also played for The Western Chiefs.

He scored a first-class century against Bermuda in 2005 and was a member of the 1999, 2003 and 2007 Cricket World Cup squads for Kenya. He has not played any cricket since 2010.
