= Maurice Odumbe =

Kenyan cricketer

Personal information
- Full name: Maurice Omondi Odumbe
- Born: 15 June 1969 (age 57); Nairobi, Kenya
- Batting: Right-handed
- Bowling: Right-arm offbreak
- Role: Batsman

International information
- National side: Kenya (1996–2003)
- ODI debut (cap 7): 18 February 1996 v India
- Last ODI: 8 April 2003 v Pakistan

Domestic team information
- Years: Team
- 1995/96–2003/04: Kenya

Career statistics
Competition	ODI	FC	LA
Matches	61	17	102
Runs scored	1,409	893	2,363
Batting average	26.09	34.34	26.85
100s/50s	0/11	3/3	1/14
Top score	83	207	119
Balls bowled	2,237	2,016	3,968
Wickets	39	40	88
Bowling average	46.33	19.55	33.88
5 wickets in innings	0	4	1
10 wickets in match	0	1	0
Best bowling	4/38	6/64	5/38
Catches/stumpings	12/0	14/0	34/0
- Source: Cricinfo, 8 May 2017

Maurice Omondi Odumbe (born 15 June 1969) is a Kenyan former cricketer and a former ODI captain for the Kenya national cricket team. Odumbe was suspended from cricket in August 2004 for allegedly receiving money from bookmakers. He was appointed the coach of Kenya's national cricket team in April 2018. However, he was replaced as national coach by David Obuya in October 2018.

== School time ==
Born in Nairobi, Odumbe attended Dr Aggrey Primary School and Upper Hill secondary School, where the right-handed batsman and right-arm offbreak bowler showed aptitude for cricket.

== Domestic career ==
Odumbe made his first-class debut in 1998 when Kenya played the touring England A side, making 16 and taking 0/29, and continued to play well for his local Nairobi side, the Aga Khan Club.

In the year 2004, he made a career best first-class innings score of 207 against the Leeward Islands.

== International career ==
Odumbe made his debut for Kenya on 4 June 1990 against Bangladesh at Amstelveen at the ICC Trophy, scoring 41 and taking 1/26, and had become one of their leading players by Kenya's One Day International (ODI) debut at the 1996 Cricket World Cup. Odumbe won the Man of the Match Award in one of cricket's biggest shocks, taking 3 for 14 in Kenya's win over the West Indies.

Odumbe was appointed national captain prior to the 1999 Cricket World Cup, winning a Man of the Match award against Sri Lanka for his 82 off 95 deliveries. Passed over for captaincy for Steve Tikolo for the 2003 Cricket World Cup, Odumbe played well as Kenya made the semi-final as well against India.

=== Ban ===
In March 2004, Odumbe was investigated by the International Cricket Council following allegations of possible match-fixing and was found guilty in August 2004 of receiving money from bookmakers and banned from cricket for five years. While commentators at the time believed that the suspension would end his career, Odumbe stated that he planned to return to cricket once the suspension ended. Odumbe played 61 ODI matches, scoring 1,409 runs at 26.09 and taking 39 wickets at 46.33, and 17 first-class matches, scoring 894 runs at 34.34 and taking 40 wickets at 19.55.

== Returned to Cricket ==
He returned to competitive cricket at domestic level in Kenya from August 2009, aged 40 .

== Beyond cricket ==
Odumbe has been heavily involved in fundraising for shelters for AIDS orphans, as well as presenting a weekly radio sports programme and appearing in a number of television commercials. He was also planning to release a song and stood as a candidate for the National Democratic Development Union in the Kenyan general election of 2007.

== See also ==
- List of cricketers banned for match fixing
