= Kennedy Otieno =

Kenyan cricketer

Kennedy Obuya
Personal information
- Full name: Kennedy Otieno Obuya
- Born: 11 March 1972 (age 54); Nairobi, Kenya
- Batting: Right-handed
- Role: Wicket-keeper
- Relatives: David Obuya (brother); Collins Obuya (brother)

International information
- National side: Kenya (1996–2009)
- ODI debut (cap 8): 18 February 1996 v India
- Last ODI: 11 July 2009 v Ireland
- T20I debut (cap 17): 2 August 2008 v Netherlands
- Last T20I: 4 August 2008 v Ireland

Career statistics
Competition	ODI	T20I	FC	LA
Matches	90	4	33	146
Runs scored	2,016	74	1,330	3,616
Batting average	23.44	18.50	23.33	26.58
100s/50s	2/12	0/0	1/9	4/21
Top score	144	40	104	144
Balls bowled	6	0	24	6
Wickets	0	–	1	0
Bowling average	–	–	24.00	–
5 wickets in innings	–	–	0	–
10 wickets in match	–	–	0	–
Best bowling	–	–	1/24	–
Catches/stumpings	43/14	2/0	47/2	74/17
- Source: Cricinfo, 14 May 2017

Kennedy Otieno Obuya (born 11 March 1972), also known as Kennedy Otieno, is a Kenyan former international cricketer. A right-handed batsman and wicketkeeper, Otieno is the brother of fellow internationals Collins and David Obuya.

== Domestic career ==
In 2008, Otieno was selected as captain of The Southern Stars, a team in Kenya's recently launched domestic cricket competition the Sahara Elite League. His most recent big scores came when he made 93 in The Southern Stars' only win in the one-day edition of the Sahara Elite league. as well as two centuries in the 2-day league, earning him a recall to the national squad.

== International career ==
Otieno made his ODI debut in 1996, but played his finest innings in 1997, scoring 144 against Bangladesh, in a then-world-record 225-run partnership with Dipak Chudasama. He was one of the key players during the 2003 Cricket World Cup, where he played in every game. Otieno played 71 of Kenya's 74 ODIs between the 1996 World Cup and the 2005–06 tour of Bangladesh (only missing three home matches against the West Indies in 2001). However, he was dropped for the first 2006 Intercontinental Cup first class game against the Netherlands, and vowed to quit international cricket as a result.
