= Aasif Karim =

Kenyan cricketer

Personal information
- Full name: Aasif Yusuf Karim
- Born: 15 December 1963 (age 62); Mombasa, Kenya
- Batting: Right-handed
- Bowling: Slow left-arm orthodox
- Role: All rounder
- Relatives: Irfan Karim (son)

International information
- National side: Kenya (1993–2003)
- ODI debut (cap 3): 18 February 1996 v India
- Last ODI: 20 March 2003 v India

Career statistics
Competition	ODI	FC	LA
Matches	34	2	40
Runs scored	228	35	274
Batting average	12.65	17.50	13.04
100s/50s	0/1	0/0	0/1
Top score	53	24	53
Balls bowled	1,568	390	1,865
Wickets	27	7	28
Bowling average	41.25	26.28	46.07
5 wickets in innings	1	0	1
10 wickets in match	0	0	0
Best bowling	5/33	3/40	5/33
Catches/stumpings	6/–	6/–	8/–
- Source: Cricinfo, 5 May 2017

Aasif Yusuf Karim (born 15 December 1963) is a Kenyan former cricketer who captained the Kenya national cricket team in One Day International (ODI) cricket. Karim made a reputation for himself as a useful lower-order batsman but predominantly as a left-arm spinner.

== International career ==
Karim holds the unique distinction of having captained his country in both representative cricket and Davis Cup tennis.

=== Cricket ===
Karim retired from international cricket following the 1999 World Cup in England but was persuaded to return to add experience to Kenya's squad for the 2003 World Cup in South Africa where he helped Kenya become the first non-Test match playing nation to reach the semi-finals of the World Cup. During the Super Sixes match against Australia, Karim gave the Australians a scare with figures of 8.2-6-7-3 and collecting Man-of-the-match honours. In his last ODI, his team lost in the World Cup semi-final against India. Karim announced at the end of the tournament that he would be retiring, this time for good.

His son, Irfan Karim, is also a professional cricketer and former captain of the Kenyan national cricket team.

=== Tennis ===
Karim represented Kenya in a Davis Cup tie against Egypt in 1988. He played two singles matches and one doubles rubber.
