= Steve Tikolo =

Kenyan cricketer

Personal information
- Full name: Stephen Ogonji Tikolo
- Born: 25 June 1971 (age 55); Nairobi, Kenya
- Nickname: Gunnzie, Guns
- Batting: Right-handed
- Bowling: Right-arm off-break
- Role: Allrounder
- Relatives: Tom Tikolo (brother); David Tikolo (brother)

International information
- National side: Kenya (1996–2014)
- ODI debut (cap 11): 18 February 1996 v India
- Last ODI: 23 January 2014 v Netherlands
- ODI shirt no.: 5
- T20I debut (cap 10): 1 September 2007 v Bangladesh
- Last T20I: 26 November 2013 v Canada
- T20I shirt no.: 5

Domestic team information
- Years: Team
- 1995/96: Border
- 2009/10–2010/11: Southern Rocks

Head coaching information
- Years: Team
- 2014: Kenya
- 2017–2019: Uganda
- 2020–2022: Tanzania
- 2022–present: Nigeria

Career statistics
Competition	ODI	T20I	FC	LA
Matches	135	15	62	213
Runs scored	3,428	345	4,728	6,105
Batting average	29.05	28.75	48.24	33.00
100s/50s	3/24	0/2	11/26	9/40
Top score	111	56*	220	133
Balls bowled	4,016	170	5,991	6,647
Wickets	94	12	85	168
Bowling average	34.20	14	37.18	30.67
5 wickets in innings	0	0	1	0
10 wickets in match	0	0	0	0
Best bowling	4/41	4/2	6/80	4/18
Catches/stumpings	67/–	9/–	58/–	104/–
- Source: Cricinfo, 12 May 2017

Stephen Ogonji Tikolo (born 25 June 1971) is a former Kenya international cricketer, and a former One Day International captain. Widely regarded as the greatest Kenyan cricketer ever, Tikolo has scored the most runs and taken the second most wickets for the team in One Day Internationals. As captain, he led Kenya to the semi-final of the 2003 Cricket World Cup.

Tikolo has coached a number of international teams since the conclusion of his playing career, including Kenya, Uganda, Nigeria and Tanzania.

== Family ==
Tikolo came from a cricketing family with his oldest brother Tom being a former captain of Kenya while his other brother David Tikolo played in the 1996 Cricket World Cup.

== Domestic career ==
Tikolo is a right-handed middle order batsman and right-arm off-spin bowler. Tikolo has previously represented Border in South African domestic cricket and has also spent time playing in England and Bangladesh. Most recently he has been playing club cricket in England and in Kenya he plays for Swamibapa Cricket Club in Nairobi.

In 2005 Tikolo was signed by Haverigg to play cricket in England.

In 2008 Tikolo was selected as captain of The Eastern Aces in Kenya's Domestic Tournament, the Sahara Elite League

== International career ==
In 1996 Cricket World Cup, Tikolo made his ODI debut for Kenya. Coming in at 3 for his maiden innings Tikolo made 65 against India. Tikolo went on to play a couple more impressive innings in the World Cup, top scoring for his side with 29 in their historic victory over the West Indies at Pune and 96 against Sri Lanka at Kandy.

Tikolo further enhanced his reputation as Kenya's premier batsman with 147 against Bangladesh in the 1997 ICC Trophy final. The innings gave them official ODI status and booked Kenya's place in England for the 1999 Cricket World Cup. It was another successful World Cup for Tikolo as he made a pair of 50s against India and England.

In 2002 Tikolo was named the new Kenyan captain and led from the front in the 2002 ICC Champions Trophy with innings of 93 and 69.

Tikolo led the Kenyan national side during their run to the semi-finals of the 2003 Cricket World Cup. This was a huge feat for a country that had not even been granted Test status, which is still rated as the best performance by Kenya in the international arena.

After a poor 2004 ICC Champions Trophy, Tikolo quit as captain and instead led a players' strike in protest against internal politics. The strike forced a new regime and he returned as captain.

In 2007 he became the first player from a non Test playing country to appear in 100 ODI games and score 2,500 ODI runs.

His last appearance as captain was the 2009 ICC World Cup Qualifier, where Kenya secured place for the 2011 Cricket World Cup.

In August 2010, months after walking out on the team and indicating he would not play international cricket again, Tikolo announced his availability for the 2011 World Cup. He announced his retirement after the World Cup but returned aged 42 when he was recalled for 2013 ICC World Twenty20 Qualifier in UAE.

Tikolo has also represented an Africa XI against an Asia XI. Tikolo's dominance of Kenyan cricket, is well highlighted that as of January 2007 he possessed six of the nine highest scores by a Kenyan batsman in ODI cricket. Tikolo has made three ODI centuries; 106* against Bangladesh, 111 against Bermuda and 102 against Zimbabwe. He has been dismissed in the 90s on three occasions.

== Coaching career ==
In July 2012 it was announced that Tikolo had been appointed the batting coach of the Ugandan national team but in May 2013, he was coach of Kenya national under-19 cricket team and his first assignment was at the ICC under-19 World Cup Africa qualifiers. During that tenure, Uganda won the T20 African Premier League and qualified for the World Cricket League Division II.

He was named interim coach of Kenya national cricket team when he replaced Robin Brown as head coach after Kenya's failure to qualify for the 2014 ICC World Twenty20.

In May 2016, Tikolo was appointed as head coach of the Uganda national cricket team ahead of the 2017 World Cricket League Division Three. He departed as coach in 2019. In February 2020, Tikolo was named as the new head coach for the Tanzania national cricket team on a 3-year deal.

In October 2022, Tikolo was unveiled as the new head coach and high performance manager of the Nigeria national cricket team. His initial contract will run for 2 years.
