= 1997–98 Coca-Cola Triangular Series =

International cricket tournament

- Date: 14–31 May 1998
- Location: India
- Result: India won the final by 9 wickets
- Player of the series: (Kenya) Steve Tikolo
Teams
Bangladesh	India	Kenya
Captains
Akram Khan	Mohammad Azharuddin	Aasif Karim
Most runs
Aminul Islam (114)	Ajay Jadeja (189)	Ravindu Shah (213)
Most wickets
Khaled Mahmud (7) Mohammad Rafique (7)	Venkatesh Prasad (8); Ajit Agarkar (8)	Steve Tikolo (6)

The 1997–98 Coca-Cola Triangular Series was a One Day International cricket tournament held in India in May 1998. It was a tri-nation series between Bangladesh, India and Kenya. India defeated Kenya in the final to win the tournament.

== Squads ==
=== India ===
- Mohammad Azharuddin (captain)
- Rahul Dravid
- Sachin Tendulkar
- Sourav Ganguly
- Ajay Jadeja
- Robin Singh
- Debasis Mohanty
- Anil Kumble
- Ajit Agarkar
- Venkatesh Prasad
- Nayan Mongia (wicket keeper)
- Rahul Sanghvi
- Hrishikesh Kanitkar
- Paras Mhambrey
- Nikhil Chopra
- Harbhajan Singh
- Gagan Khoda
- Navjot Singh Sidhu
- Jatin Paranjpe
- VVS Laxman
- Nilesh Kulkarni
- Saba Karim (wicket keeper)
- MSK Prasad (wicket keeper)

=== Bangladesh ===
- Akram Khan remaining matches (captain)
- Khaled Mahmud
- Mohammad Rafique
- Athar Ali Khan
- Enamul Haque
- Hasibul Hossain
- Morshed Ali Khan
- Naimur Rahman
- Anisur Rahman
- Khaled Mashud (wicket keeper)
- Aminul Islam only for 1st match (captain)
- Minhajul Abedin
- Mehrab Hossain
- Sanwar Hossain

=== Kenya ===
- Aasif Karim (captain)
- Steve Tikolo
- Mohammad Sheikh
- Maurice Odumbe
- Martin Suji
- Joseph Angara
- Thomas Odoyo
- Ravi Shah
- Hitesh Modi
- Lameck Onyango
- Kennedy Otieno (wicket keeper)
- Dipak Chudasama
- Tony Suji
- Alpesh Vadher

== Points table ==
India and Kenya advanced to the Finals on the basis of points.

Team	P	W	L	T	NR	NRR	Points
India	4	3	1	0	0	+0.265	6
Kenya	4	2	2	0	0	+0.362	4
Bangladesh	4	1	3	0	0	−0.662	2

== Matches ==
=== 1st ODI ===
14 May 1998 (D/N)
Scorecard

Bangladesh; 184/9 (50 overs)	v	India; 185/5 (45.2 overs)
Aminul Islam 70 (126); Ajit Agarkar 3/41 (8 overs)		Ajay Jadeja 73 (101); Athar Ali Khan 2/33 (10 overs)

India won by 5 wickets
Punjab Cricket Association Stadium, Mohali
Umpires: K. N. Raghavan (Ind) and Ivaturi Shivram (Ind)
Player of the match: Ajay Jadeja (Ind)

- India won the toss and elected to field.
- Mehrab Hossain, Morshed Ali Khan (Ban); Gagan Khoda and M. S. K. Prasad (Ind) all made their ODI debuts.

=== 2nd ODI ===
17 May 1998 (D/N)
Scorecard

Kenya; 236 (49 overs)	v	Bangladesh; 237/4 (48 overs)
Ravi Shah 52 (64); Mohammad Rafique 3/56 (10 overs)		Mohammad Rafique 77 (87); Mohammad Sheikh 2/46 (10 overs)

Bangladesh won by 6 wickets
Lal Bahadur Shastri Stadium, Hyderabad
Umpires: C. R. Mohite (Ind) and S. K. Sharma (Ind)
Player of the match: Mohammad Rafique (Ban)

- Kenya won the toss and elected to bat.
- Ravi Shah (Ken) made his ODI debut.
- This was Bangladesh's first win in an ODI.

=== 3rd ODI ===
20 May 1998 (D/N)
Scorecard

Kenya; 223/9 (50 overs)	v	India; 224/6 (47 overs)
Steve Tikolo 77 (92); Robin Singh 2/24 (8 overs)		Gagan Khoda 89 (129); Mohammad Sheikh 2/41 (7 overs)

India won by 4 wickets
M Chinnaswamy Stadium, Bangalore
Umpires: Aloke Bhattacharjee (Ind) and Devendra Sharma (Ind)
Player of the match: Gagan Khoda (Ind)

- India won the toss and elected to field.

=== 4th ODI ===
23 May 1998 (D/N)
Scorecard

Kenya; 226/8 (50 overs)	v	Bangladesh; 198 (46.2 overs)
Steve Tikolo 65 (75); Khaled Mahmud 2/20 (4 overs)		Minhajul Abedin 45 (80); Thomas Odoyo 2/31 (7 overs)

Kenya won by 28 runs
MA Chidambaram Stadium, Chennai
Umpires: Sudhir Asnani (Ind) and Suresh Shastri (Ind)
Player of the match: Steve Tikolo (Ken)

- Kenya won the toss and elected to bat.
- One over was lost in Bangladesh's innings due to a power failure.

=== 5th ODI ===
25 May 1998 (D/N)
Scorecard

Bangladesh; 115 (36.3 overs)	v	India; 116/5 (29.2 overs)
Hasibul Hossain 21 (20); Anil Kumble 3/17 (10 overs)		Navjot Sidhu 41 (52); Khaled Mahmud 2/12 (7.2 overs)

India won by 5 wickets
Wankhede Stadium, Mumbai
Umpires: R. T. Ramachandran (Ind) and B. K. Sadashiva (Ind)
Player of the match: Anil Kumble (Ind)

- Bangladesh won the toss and elected to bat.

=== 6th ODI ===
28 May 1998 (D/N)
Scorecard

Kenya; 265/5 (50 overs)	v	India; 196 (47.1 overs)
Maurice Odumbe 83 (91); Anil Kumble 2/27 (8 overs)		Rahul Dravid 33 (53); Maurice Odumbe 3/14 (4.1 overs)

Kenya won by 69 runs
Captain Roop Singh Stadium, Gwalior
Umpires: Subrata Banerjee (Ind) and Rajan Seth (Ind)
Player of the match: Maurice Odumbe (Ken)

- Kenya won the toss and elected to bat.
- Nikhil Chopra and Jatin Paranjpe (Ind) both made their ODI debuts.
- This was Kenya's second win against a Test nation.

=== Final ===
31 May 1998 (D/N)
Scorecard

Kenya; 196 (46.3 overs)	v	India; 197/1 (35 overs)
Hitesh Modi 71 (93); Venkatesh Prasad 4/23 (10 overs)		Sachin Tendulkar 100* (103); Joseph Angara 1/37 (6 overs)

India won by 9 wickets
Eden Gardens, Calcutta
Umpires: Arani Jayaprakash (Ind) and K. Parthasarathy (Ind)
Player of the match: Sachin Tendulkar (Ind)

- Kenya won the toss and elected to bat.
