= 1998 Coca-Cola Triangular Series =

1998 Coca Cola Triangular Series
- Date: 14–31 May 1998
- Location: India
- Result: Won by India
- Player of the series: Steve Tikolo
Teams
India	Bangladesh	Kenya
Captains
Mohammad Azharuddin	Akram Khan	Aasif Karim
Most runs
Ajay Jadeja (189)	Aminul Islam (114)	Ravi Shah (213)
Most wickets
Venkatesh Prasad (8) Ajit Agarkar (8)	Khaled Mahmud (7); Mohammad Rafique (7)	Steve Tikolo (6)

The Coca-Cola Triangular Series was the name of the One Day International cricket tournament in India held in 1998. It was a tri-nation series between Kenya, India and Bangladesh.

India and Kenya reached the finals through a round robin league format. India beat Kenya in the Finals to clinch the trophy.

== Squads ==
India	Bangladesh	Kenya
Mohammad Azharuddin (captain); Rahul Dravid; Sachin Tendulkar; Sourav Ganguly; Ajay Jadeja; Robin Singh; Debasis Mohanty; Anil Kumble; Ajit Agarkar; Venkatesh Prasad; Nayan Mongia (wicket keeper); Rahul Sanghvi; Hrishikesh Kanitkar; Paras Mhambrey; Nikhil Chopra; Harbhajan Singh; Gagan Khoda; Navjot Singh Sidhu; Jatin Paranjpe; VVS Laxman; Nilesh Kulkarni; Saba Karim (wicket keeper); MSK Prasad (wicket keeper)	Akram Khan remaining matches (captain); Khaled Mahmud; Mohammad Rafique; Athar Ali Khan; Enamul Haque; Hasibul Hossain; Morshed Ali Khan; Naimur Rahman; Anisur Rahman; Khaled Mashud (wicket keeper); Aminul Islam only for 1st match(captain); Minhajul Abedin; Mehrab Hossain; Sanwar Hossain	Aasif Karim (captain); Steve Tikolo; Mohammad Sheikh; Maurice Odumbe; Martin Suji; Joseph Angara; Thomas Odoyo; Ravi Shah; Hitesh Modi; Lameck Onyango; Kennedy Otieno (wicket keeper); Dipak Chudasama; Tony Suji; Alpesh Vadher

== Group stage points table ==
India and Kenya advanced to the Finals on the basis of points.

Team	P	W	L	T	NR	NRR	Points
India	4	3	1	0	0	+0.265	6
Kenya	4	2	2	0	0	+0.362	4
Bangladesh	4	1	3	0	0	−0.662	2

== Match results ==
=== 1st match ===
14 May 1998 (D/N)
(Scorecard)

Bangladesh; 184/9 (50 overs)	v	India; 185/5 (45.2 overs)
Aminul Islam 70 (126); AB Agarkar 3/41 (8 overs)		AD Jadeja 73 (101); Athar Ali Khan 2/33 (10 overs)

India won by 5 wickets
Punjab Cricket Association IS Bindra Stadium, Mohali
Umpires: KN Raghavan and I Shivram
Player of the match: AD Jadeja (IND)

- India won the toss and elected to field.
- Mehrab Hossain and Morshed Ali Khan (both BAN), and GK Khoda and MSK Prasad (both IND) made their ODI debuts.

=== 2nd match ===
17 May 1998 (D/N)
(Scorecard)

Kenya; 236 (49 overs)	v	Bangladesh; 237/4 (48 overs)
RD Shah 52 (64); Mohammed Rafique 3/56 (10 overs)		Mohammed Rafique 77 (87); M Sheikh 2/46 (10 overs)

Bangladesh won by 6 wickets
Lal Bahadur Shastri Stadium, Hyderabad
Umpires: CR Mohite and SK Sharma
Player of the match: Mohammed Rafique (BAN)

- Kenya won the toss and elected to bat.
- RD Shah (KEN) made his ODI debut.
- This was Bangladesh's first ever ODI win.

=== 3rd match ===
20 May 1998 (D/N)
(Scorecard)

Kenya; 223/9 (50 overs)	v	India; 224/6 (47 overs)
SO Tikolo 77 (92); RR Singh 2/24 (8 overs)		GK Khoda 89 (129); M Sheikh 2/41 (7 overs)

India won by 4 wickets
M. Chinnaswamy Stadium, Bengaluru
Umpires: A Bhattacharjee and D Sharma
Player of the match: GK Khoda (IND)

- India won the toss and elected to field.

=== 4th match ===
23 May 1998 (D/N)
(Scorecard)

Kenya; 226/8 (50 overs)	v	Bangladesh; 198 (46.2 overs)
SO Tikolo 65 (75); Khaled Mahmud 2/20 (4 overs)		Minhajul Abedin 45 (80); AY Karim 2/28 (9 overs)

Kenya won by 27 runs (revised target)
M. A. Chidambaram Stadium, Chennai
Umpires: S Asnani and SL Shastri
Player of the match: SO Tikolo (KEN)

- Kenya won the toss and elected to bat.
- Bangladesh target was 226 runs in 49 overs.

=== 5th match ===
25 May 1998 (D/N)
(Scorecard)

Bangladesh; 115 (36.3 overs)	v	India; 116/5 (29.2 overs)
Hasibul Hossain 21 (20); A Kumble 3/17 (10 overs)		NS Sidhu 41 (52); Khaled Mahmud 2/12 (7.2 overs)

India won by 5 wickets
Wankhede Stadium, Mumbai
Umpires: RT Ramachandran and BK Sadashiva
Player of the match: A Kumble (IND)

- Bangladesh won the toss and elected to bat.

=== 6th match ===
28 May 1998 (D/N)
(Scorecard)

Kenya; 265/5 (50 overs)	v	India; 196 (47.1 overs)
MO Odumbe 83 (91); A Kumble 2/27 (8 overs)		RS Dravid 33 (53); MO Odumbe 3/14 (4.1 overs)

Kenya won by 69 runs
Captain Roop Singh Stadium, Gwalior
Umpires: S Banerjee and RK Seth
Player of the match: MO Odumbe (KEN)

- Kenya won the toss and elected to bat.
- N Chopra and JV Paranjpe (both IND) made their ODI debuts.

=== Final ===
31 May 1998 (D/N)
(Scorecard)

Kenya; 196 (46.3 overs)	v	India; 197/1 (35 overs)
HS Modi 71 (93); BKV Prasad 4/23 (10 overs)		SR Tendulkar 100* (103); JO Angara 1/37 (6 overs)

India won by 9 wickets (with 90 balls remaining)
Eden Gardens, Kolkata
Umpires: AV Jayaprakash and K Parthasarathy
Player of the match: SR Tendulkar (IND)

- Kenya won the toss and elected to bat.
