= 1995 Asia Cup =

Cricket tournament in the United Arab Emirates

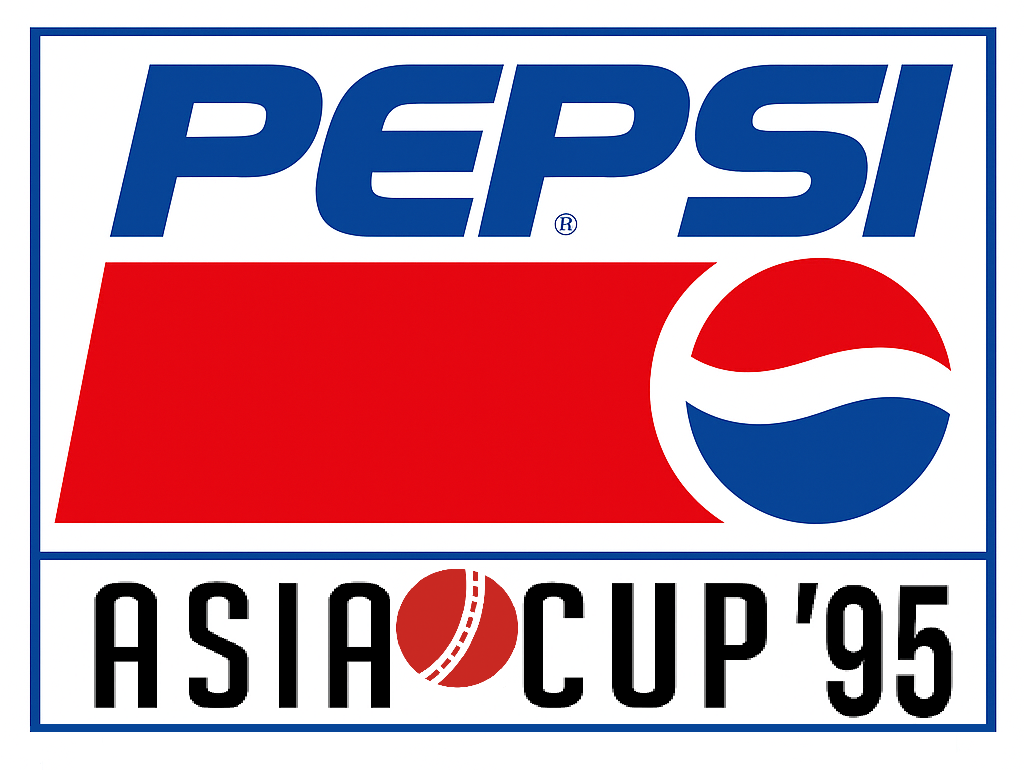
- Asia Cup Logo
- Dates: 5 – 14 April 1995
- Administrator: Asian Cricket Council
- Cricket format: One Day International
- Tournament format(s): Round-robin and Knockout
- Host: United Arab Emirates
- Champions: India (4th title)
- Runners-up: Sri Lanka
- Participants: 4
- Matches: 7
- Player of the series: (India) Navjot Sidhu
- Most runs: (India) Sachin Tendulkar (205)
- Most wickets: (India) Anil Kumble (7)

The 1995 Asia Cup (also known as the Pepsi Asia Cup), was the fifth Asia Cup tournament, and the second to be held in Sharjah, UAE. The tournament took place between April 5–14, 1995. Four teams took part in the tournament: India, Pakistan, Sri Lanka and Bangladesh.

The 1995 Asia Cup was a round-robin tournament where each team played the other once, and the top two teams qualifying for a place in the final. All the matches, including the final, were played at the Sharjah Cricket Association Stadium in Sharjah. India, Pakistan and Sri Lanka all had four points at the end of the round-robin stage, but India and Sri Lanka qualified for the final on the basis of better run-rates. India beat Sri Lanka by 8 wickets to win its third consecutive (and fourth in total) Asia Cup.

== Squads ==
Squads
India	Sri Lanka	Pakistan	Bangladesh
Mohammad Azharuddin (c)	Arjuna Ranatunga (c)	Moin Khan (c) & (wk)	Akram Khan (c)
Manoj Prabhakar	Asanka Gurusinha	Aamer Sohail	Athar Ali Khan
Sachin Tendulkar	Sanath Jayasuriya	Saeed Anwar	Javed Omar
Navjot Singh Sidhu	Roshan Mahanama	Ghulam Ali	Sajjad Ahmed
Sanjay Manjrekar	Aravinda de Silva	Inzamam-ul-Haq	Aminul Islam
Ajay Jadeja	Hashan Tillakaratne	Asif Mujtaba	Minhajul Abedin
Nayan Mongia (wk)	Romesh Kaluwitharana (wk)	Wasim Akram	Enamul Haque
Anil Kumble	Kumar Dharmasena	Zafar Iqbal	Mohammad Rafique
Javagal Srinath	Chaminda Vaas	Naeem Ashraf	Khaled Mashud (wk)
Venkatesh Prasad	Muttiah Muralitharan	Nadeem Khan	Saiful Islam
Aashish Kapoor	Janak Gamage	Aaqib Javed	Anisur Rahman
Vinod Kambli	Ruwan Kalpage	Aamer Nazir	Habibul Bashar
Prashant Vaidya	Chamara Dunusinghe	Arshad Khan	Hasibul Hossain
Utpal Chatterjee	Champaka Ramanayake	Mahmood Hamid	Naimur Rahman

== Matches ==
=== Group stage ===
Pos	Team	Pld	W	L	NR	Pts	NRR	Qualification
1	India	3	2	1	0	4	4.856	Advanced to the Final
2	Sri Lanka	3	2	1	0	4	4.701	Advanced to the Final
3	Pakistan	3	2	1	0	4	4.596	Eliminated
4	Bangladesh	3	0	3	0	0	2.933	Eliminated

Source: ESPN Cricinfo

5 April 1995
Scorecard

Bangladesh; 163 (44.4 overs)	v	India; 164/1 (27.5 overs)
Aminul Islam 30 (53); Anil Kumble 2/23 (8 overs)		Navjot Sidhu 56* (51); Mohammad Rafique 1/15 (5 overs)

India won by 9 wickets
Sharjah Cricket Association Stadium, Sharjah
Umpires: Nigel Plews (Eng) and Ian Robinson (Zim)
Player of the match: Manoj Prabhakar (Ind)

- Sajjad Ahmed, Khaled Mashud, Javed Omar, Mohammad Rafique and Anisur Rahman (all Ban), and Utpal Chatterjee (Ind) made their debut in ODIs.

6 April 1995
Scorecard

Sri Lanka; 233 (49.4 overs)	v	Bangladesh; 126 (44.2 overs)
Arjuna Ranatunga 71 (72); Saiful Islam 4/36 (10 overs)		Minhajul Abedin 26 (37); Muttiah Muralitharan 4/23 (8.2 overs)

Sri Lanka won by 107 runs
Sharjah Cricket Association Stadium, Sharjah
Umpires: Cyril Mitchley (SA) and Nigel Plews (Eng)
Player of the match: Arjuna Ranatunga (SL)

- Chamara Dunusinghe (SL), and Habibul Bashar and Hasibul Hossain (both Ban) made their debut in ODIs.

7 April 1995
Scorecard

Pakistan; 266/9 (50 overs)	v	India; 169 (42.4 overs)
Inzamam-ul-Haq 88 (100); Anil Kumble 2/29 (8 overs)		Navjot Sidhu 54 (108); Aaqib Javed 5/19 (9 overs)

Pakistan won by 97 runs
Sharjah Cricket Association Stadium, Sharjah
Umpires: Cyril Mitchley (SA) and Ian Robinson (Zim)
Player of the match: Aaqib Javed (Pak)

- Naeem Ashraf and Zafar Iqbal (both Pak) made their debut in ODIs.

8 April 1995
Scorecard

Bangladesh; 151/8 (50 overs)	v	Pakistan; 152/4 (29.4 overs)
Akram Khan 44 (82); Aamer Nazir 2/23 (7 overs)		Ghulam Ali 38 (53); Athar Ali Khan 1/10 (2 overs)

Pakistan won by 6 wickets
Sharjah Cricket Association Stadium, Sharjah
Umpires: Nigel Plews (Eng) and Ian Robinson (Zim)
Player of the match: Wasim Akram (Pak)

- Naimur Rahman (Ban) made his debut in ODIs.

9 April 1995
Scorecard

Sri Lanka; 202/9 (50 overs)	v	India; 206/2 (33.1 overs)
Hashan Tillakaratne 48 (78); Venkatesh Prasad 3/37 (10 overs)		Sachin Tendulkar 112 (107); Sanath Jayasuriya 2/42 (10 overs)

India won by 8 wickets
Sharjah Cricket Association Stadium, Sharjah
Umpires: Cyril Mitchley (SA) and Nigel Plews (Eng)
Player of the match: Sachin Tendulkar (Ind)

- Sachin Tendulkar (Ind) became the youngest player to reach 3,000 runs in ODIs.

11 April 1995
Scorecard

Pakistan; 178/9 (50 overs)	v	Sri Lanka; 180/5 (30.5 overs)
Inzamam-ul-Haq 73 (96); Champaka Ramanayake 3/25 (10 overs)		Roshan Mahanama 48 (74); Aamer Sohail 2/21 (5 overs)

Sri Lanka won by 5 wickets
Sharjah Cricket Association Stadium, Sharjah
Umpires: Cyril Mitchley (SA) and Ian Robinson (Zim)
Player of the match: Sanath Jayasuriya (SL)

- Mahmood Hamid and Javed Qadeer (both Pak) made their debut in ODIs.

== Final ==
14 April 1995
Scorecard

Sri Lanka; 230/7 (50 overs)	v	India; 233/2 (41.5 overs)
Asanka Gurusinha 85 (122); Venkatesh Prasad 2/32 (10 overs)		Mohammad Azharuddin 90* (121); Champaka Ramanayake 1/52 (8.5 overs)

India won by 8 wickets
Sharjah Cricket Association Stadium, Sharjah
Umpires: Nigel Plews (Eng) and Cyril Mitchley (SA)
Player of the match: Mohammad Azharuddin (Ind)

- India won the toss and elected to field.

== Statistics ==
=== Most runs ===
Player	Matches	Innings	Runs	Average	SR	HS	100	50	4s	6s
(India) Sachin Tendulkar	4	4	205	68.33	109.62	112*	1	0	30	2
(India) Navjot Singh Sidhu	4	4	197	98.50	80.40	84*	0	3	19	0
(Pakistan) Inzamam-ul-Haq	3	3	190	95.00	86.75	88	0	2	11	3
(Sri Lanka) Sanath Jayasuriya	4	4	134	33.50	87.01	51	0	1	20	1
(India) Manoj Prabhakar	4	4	122	40.66	64.89	60	0	2	12	0
Source: Cricinfo

=== Most wickets ===
Player	Matches	Innings	Wickets	Overs	Econ.	Ave.	BBI	S/R	4WI	5WI
(India) Anil Kumble	4	4	7	36	3.86	19.85	2/23	20.5	0	0
(India) Venkatesh Prasad	3	3	6	28	4.00	18.66	3/37	19.5	0	0
(Pakistan) Aaqib Javed	2	2	5	19	2.52	9.60	5/19	30.0	0	1
(Bangladesh) Saiful Islam	3	3	5	22	4.54	20.00	4/36	19.2	1	0
(Sri Lanka) Muttiah Muralitharan	3	3	5	28.2	3.91	22.20	4/23	26.4	1	0
Source: Cricinfo

== See also ==
- Asia Cup
