= 1997 Asia Cup =

Cricket tournament in Sri Lanka

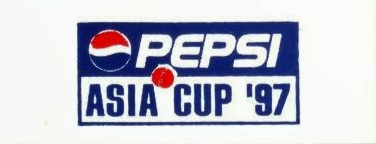
- Dates: 14 – 26 July 1997
- Administrator: Asian Cricket Council
- Cricket format: One Day International
- Tournament format(s): Round-robin and Knockout
- Host: Sri Lanka
- Champions: Sri Lanka (2nd title)
- Runners-up: India
- Participants: 4
- Matches: 7
- Player of the series: (Sri Lanka) Arjuna Ranatunga
- Most runs: (Sri Lanka) Arjuna Ranatunga (272)
- Most wickets: (India) Venkatesh Prasad (7)

The 1997 Asia Cup (also known as the Pepsi Asia Cup 1997) was the sixth Asia Cup tournament, and the second to be held in Sri Lanka. The tournament took place between July 14–26, 1997. Four teams took part in the tournament: India, Pakistan, Sri Lanka and Bangladesh.

The 1997 Asia Cup was a round-robin tournament where each team played the other once, and the top two teams qualifying for a place in the final. India and Sri Lanka qualified for the final where Sri Lanka won by 8 wickets to win its second Asia Cup and ending India's three consecutive championship run.

== Squads ==
Squads
| India | Sri Lanka | Pakistan | Bangladesh |
|---|---|---|---|
| Sachin Tendulkar (c) | Arjuna Ranatunga (c) | Ramiz Raja (c) | Akram Khan (c) |
| Sourav Ganguly | Sanath Jayasuriya | Saeed Anwar | Athar Ali Khan |
| Navjot Singh Sidhu | Marvan Atapattu | Aamer Sohail | Naimur Rahman |
| Rahul Dravid | Aravinda de Silva | Inzamam-ul-Haq | Habibul Bashar |
| Mohammad Azharuddin | Roshan Mahanama | Saleem Malik | Aminul Islam |
| Robin Singh | Romesh Kaluwitharana (wk) | Moin Khan (wk) | Enamul Haque |
| Ajay Jadeja | Ruwan Kalpage | Shahid Afridi | Minhajul Abedin |
| Saba Karim (wk) | Kumar Dharmasena | Saqlain Mushtaq | Khaled Mashud (wk) |
| Anil Kumble | Chaminda Vaas | Aaqib Javed | Hasibul Hossain |
| Abey Kuruvilla | Muttiah Muralitharan | Arshad Khan | Saiful Islam |
| Venkatesh Prasad | Sajeewa de Silva | Kabir Khan | Sheikh Salahuddin |
| Noel David | Lanka de Silva | - | Mafizur Rahman |
| Nilesh Kulkarni | Upul Chandana | - | Zakir Hasan |
| - | Dulip Liyanage | - | - |

== Matches ==
=== Group stage ===
| Pos | Team | Pld | W | L | NR | Pts | NRR | Qualification |
|---|---|---|---|---|---|---|---|---|
| 1 | Sri Lanka (H) | 3 | 3 | 0 | 0 | 6 | 1.035 | Advanced to the Final |
| 2 | India | 3 | 1 | 1 | 1 | 3 | 1.405 | Advanced to the Final |
| 3 | Pakistan | 3 | 1 | 1 | 1 | 3 | 0.940 | Eliminated |
| 4 | Bangladesh | 3 | 0 | 3 | 0 | 0 | −2.895 | Eliminated |

Source: ESPN Cricinfo
(H) Host

14 July 1997
Scorecard

| Sri Lanka; 239 (49.5 overs) | v | Pakistan; 224/9 (50 overs) |
| Marvan Atapattu 80 (113); Kabir Khan 2/49 (8 overs) | | Saleem Malik 57 (79); Sanath Jayasuriya 4/49 (10 overs) |

Sri Lanka won by 15 runs
R Premadasa Stadium, Colombo
Umpires: Shyam Bansal (Ind) and S Venkataraghavan (Ind)
Player of the match: Marvan Atapattu (SL)

- Pakistan won the toss and elected to field.

16 July 1997
Scorecard

| Pakistan; 319/5 (50 overs) | v | Bangladesh; 210 (49.3 overs) |
| Saeed Anwar 90 (94); Saiful Islam 1/45 (7 overs) | | Athar Ali Khan 82 (125); Saqlain Mushtaq 5/38 (9.3 overs) |

Pakistan won by 105 runs
R Premadasa Stadium, Colombo
Umpires: Shyam Bansal (Ind) and B. C. Cooray (SL)
Player of the match: Saeed Anwar (Pak)

- Pakistan won the toss and elected to bat.
- Sheikh Salahuddin (Ban) made his ODI debut.

18 July 1997
Scorecard

| India; 227/6 (50 overs) | v | Sri Lanka; 231/4 (44.4 overs) |
| Mohammad Azharuddin 81* (103); Chaminda Vaas 2/35 (8 overs) | | Arjuna Ranatunga 131* (152); Robin Singh 2/29 (4 overs) |

Sri Lanka won by 6 wickets
R Premadasa Stadium, Colombo
Umpires: Mohammad Nazir (Pak) and Saleem Badar (Pak)
Player of the match: Arjuna Ranatunga (SL)

- Sri Lanka won the toss and elected to field.

20 July 1997
Scorecard

| Pakistan; 30/5 (9 overs) | v | India |
| Saleem Malik 10 (13); Venkatesh Prasad 4/17 (5 overs) |

No result
SSCG, Colombo
Umpires: B. C. Cooray (SL) and K. T. Francis (SL)

- India won the toss and elected to field.
- Rain and bad light after 5 overs stopped the game, and Umpires reduced the overs per side to 33.
  When the game resumed, it had to be called off again due to bad light.

21 July 1997
Scorecard

| Pakistan | v | India |

Match abandoned without a ball bowled
SSCG, Colombo
Umpires: B. C. Cooray (SL) and K. T. Francis (SL)

22 July 1997
Scorecard

| Sri Lanka; 296/4 (46 overs) | v | Bangladesh; 193/8 (46 overs) |
| Sanath Jayasuriya 108 (83); Minhajul Abedin 2-43 (9 overs) | | Naimur Rahman 47 (85); Muralitharan 2-29 (10 overs) |

Sri Lanka won by 103 runs
SSCG, Colombo
Umpires: Saleem Badar (Pak) and S Venkataraghavan (Ind)
Player of the match: Sanath Jayasuriya (SL)

- Bangladesh won the toss and elected to field.
- Mafizur Rahman (Ban) made his ODI debut.

24 July 1997
Scorecard

| Bangladesh; 130/8 (43 overs) | v | India; 132/1 (15 overs) |
| Athar Ali Khan 33 (69); Robin Singh 3/13 (9 overs) | | Sourav Ganguly 73 (52); Enamul Haque 1/34 (3 overs) |

India won by 9 wickets
SSCG, Colombo
Umpires: K. T. Francis (SL) and Mohammad Nazir (Pak)
Player of the match: Sourav Ganguly (Ind)

- India won the toss and elected to field.
- Zakir Hasan (Ban) made his ODI debut.

=== Final ===
26 July 1997
Scorecard

| India; 239/7 (50 overs) | v | Sri Lanka; 240/2 (36.5 overs) |
| Mohammad Azharuddin 81 (102); Chaminda Vaas 2/32 (8 overs) | | MS Atapattu 84 (101); Nilesh Kulkarni 1/48 (10 overs) |

Sri Lanka won by 8 wickets
R. Premadasa Stadium, Colombo
Umpires: Mohammad Nazir (Pak) and Saleem Badar (Pak)
Player of the match: MS Atapattu (SL)

- India won the toss and elected to bat.
- Nilesh Kulkarni (Ind) made his ODI debut.

== Statistics ==
=== Most runs ===
| Player | Matches | Innings | Runs | Average | SR | HS | 100 | 50 | 4s | 6s |
|---|---|---|---|---|---|---|---|---|---|---|
| (Sri Lanka) Arjuna Ranatunga | 4 | 4 | 272 | 136.00 | 88.02 | 131* | 1 | 2 | 29 | 3 |
| (Sri Lanka) Marvan Atapattu | 4 | 4 | 255 | 85.00 | 73.91 | 84* | 0 | 3 | 18 | 1 |
| (Sri Lanka) Sanath Jayasuriya | 4 | 4 | 204 | 51.00 | 115.25 | 108 | 1 | 1 | 23 | 6 |
| (India) Mohammad Azharuddin | 4 | 3 | 185 | 185.00 | 82.22 | 81* | 0 | 2 | 8 | 4 |
| (Bangladesh) Athar Ali Khan | 3 | 3 | 157 | 52.33 | 62.30 | 82 | 0 | 1 | 17 | 2 |
Source: Cricinfo

=== Most wickets ===
| Player | Matches | Innings | Wickets | Overs | Econ. | Ave. | BBI | S/R | 4WI | 5WI |
|---|---|---|---|---|---|---|---|---|---|---|
| (India) Venkatesh Prasad | 4 | 4 | 7 | 24 | 6.07 | 17.00 | 4/17 | 20.5 | 1 | 0 |
| (Pakistan) Saqlain Mushtaq | 3 | 2 | 6 | 19.3 | 6.53 | 12.66 | 5/38 | 19.5 | 0 | 1 |
| (Sri Lanka) Sanath Jayasuriya | 4 | 3 | 6 | 30 | 6.27 | 24.50 | 4/49 | 30.0 | 1 | 0 |
| (India) Robin Singh | 4 | 3 | 5 | 16 | 6.10 | 13.60 | 3/13 | 19.2 | 0 | 0 |
| (Sri Lanka) Chaminda Vaas | 3 | 3 | 5 | 22 | 7.57 | 19.40 | 2/32 | 26.4 | 0 | 0 |
Source: Cricinfo

== See also ==
- Asia Cup
