= 1996–97 SAARC Quadrangular =

- Dates: 19 – 28 February 1997
- Administrator: SAARC cricket
- Cricket format: 50 overs
- Tournament format: Round-robin
- Champions: Pakistan (1st title)
- Participants: 4
- Matches: 7
- Most runs: S. Sarath (99)
- Most wickets: Harvinder Singh (12)

The third and final SAARC Quadrangular was held in Dhaka in February 1997. The Pakistan 'A' team, led by Asif Mujtaba, won the trophy after beating India 'A' in a rain affected final.

== The teams ==
For the first time Pakistan and Sri Lanka took the tournament seriously, and sent strong teams. Mujtaba, the Pak captain, led from the front, and finished as the Player of the Tournament. He was helped in the batting department by Basit and Sarfraz. The bowling attack was led by Zahid, arguably the fastest bowler at the time. While he struggled with no balls and wides, he still generated lot of pace from the slow wickets, and was a constant menace to the opposition batsmen. medium pacer Azhar came good in the final.

The Indian team, (led by Khurasiya, failed to perform up to expectation. In the group match, they were badly beaten by Pak 'A', as the Indian batting collapsed badly. Only the makeshift opener MSK Prasad batted bravely to carry his bat thorough the innings for 56. The next highest score was by Mr. Extra (48). India, However, can consider them a bit unlucky in the final, as they were still in the game (with in form S. Sarath and MSK Prasad at the wicket) when rain intervened, and calculators were used to determine the champions. Indian medium pacer, Harvinder was the top bowler of the tournament with 12 wickets. Sri Lanka achieved their first (and only) victory in SAARC Quadrangular history by beating Bangladesh by 5 wickets. Nawaz and Kalpage batted consistently for the Lankans.

Although the local side (Coached by WI legend Greenidge) lost all their 3 games, there was no disgrace as all the oppositions were much stronger. The batting looked good, the skipper Akram Khan, his deputy Bulbul, the veteran Nannu and the youngster Sanwar all warmed up well for the upcoming ICC trophy with a half century each. The bowling, however, looked completely harmless. Anisur who did so much damage with the reverse swing in 1994-95 failed to make any impact this time.

== Scores in brief ==
Date	Match	Team 1	Team 2	Result
19 February	Bangladesh Vs. Pakistan	Bangladesh 182/9 (Hasibul 42*, Kabir 3/29)	Pakistan 'A' 186/4 (Mujtaba 67, Wasim 42)	Pakistan 'A' wins by 6 wickets
20 February	India Vs. Sri Lanka	—N/a	—N/a	Match abondoend due to bad weather
22 February	Bangladesh Vs. Sri Lanka	Bangladesh 220/9 (Sanwar 76, Akram 54, Liyanage 4/42)	Sri Lanka 'A' 222/5 (Nawaz 88)	Sri Lanka 'A' wins by 5 wickets
23 February	India Vs. Pakistan	Pakistan 'A' 232/9 (Basit 67, Hussain 51, Harvinder 6/43)	India 'A' 164 (MSK Prasad 56*, Zahid 3/36)	Pakistan 'A' wins by 68 runs
25 February	Pakistan Vs. Sri Lanka	Sri Lanka 'A' 130 (Ruwan 54, Aaqib 4/17)	Pakistan'A' 132/9 (Sarfraz 64*, Ranjith 3/27)	Pakistan 'A' wins by 1 wicket
26 February	Bangladesh Vs. India	Bangladesh 235/7 (Bulbul 78, Nannu 53, Harvinder 4/44)	India 'A' 236/3 (S. Sarath 64*, Khoda 63)	India 'A' wins by 7 wickets
28 February	Pakistan Vs. India (Final)	Pakistan 'A' 199 (Mujtaba 91, Noel 3/32	India 'A' 124/5 (S. Sarath 35*, Azhar 3/30)	Pakistan 'A' wins by 38 runs (Parabola Method)

== The final ==
Despite the fact that the local side had been eliminated, a strong holiday crowd gathered to watch the final between the two traditional rivals of the region. They saw plenty of good cricket, but unfortunately late afternoon rain spoiled an exciting finish. The Pak side won the toss and decided to bat first. The Indian new ball bowlers Debashish and Arindam Sarkar struck early blows to leave the opposition struggling at 29/2. The Pak captain started the recovery sharing 41 for the 3rd wicket with Sarfraz (31). The Pak captain went on to score 91, but he got little support from the middle order. Only Jamshed with 26 stood firm. Pakistan lost their last 6 wickets for only 62 runs as off spinner Noel and the most successful bowler of the tournament Harvinder destroyed the lower order. The Paks batted for only 43.2 overs.

In reply, the India 'A' got off to a solid start, as their opening pair of Jaffer and Khoda defied the new ball attack of Aaqib and Zahid. The openers, However, failed to convert starts into scores. The skipper, Khurasiya, batting at No. 3, made 27, but the introduction of Azhar into the bowling changed the course of the game. From 69/1, India 'A' slumped to 112/5. The run out of Sairaj Bahutule didn't help their. Still they fancied their chances with S. Sarath at the wicket. But the weather had the last say, and according to the Parabola method, Pakistan'A' were declared the winners. Mujtaba was adjudged the player of the Final.

== Top batsmen of the tournament (80 or more runs) ==
Name	Matches	Runs	Average	Highest Score	50
S. Sarath (Ind)	3	99	99.00	64*	1
Ruwan Kalpage (SL)	2	85	85.00	54	1
Naveed Nawaz (SL)	2	94	47.00	88	1
Basit Ali (Pak)	3	90	45.00	67	1
Asif Mujtaba (Pak)	4	179	44.75	91	2
Sanwar Hossain (Ban)	2	89	44.50	76	1
Akhtar Sarfraz (Pak)	4	133	44.33	64*	1
Aminul Islam (Ban)	2	83	41.50	78	1
Akram Khan (Ban)	3	87	29.00	54	1

Note:The Bangladesh middle order batsman Minhajul Abedin played in only one game, and scored 53, thus finishing with an average of 53.00

== Top bowlers of the tournament (5 or more wickets) ==
Name	Matches	Runs	Wickets	Average	Best
Harvinder Singh (Ind)	3	131	12	10.91	6/43
Dulip Liyanage (SL)	2	64	5	12.80	4/42
Aaqib Javed (Pak)	4	91	6	15.16	4/17
Mohammad Zahid (Pak)	3	107	6	17.83	3/36
Azhar Mahmood (Pak)	4	96	5	19.20	3/30
Mohammad Hussain (Pak)	4	97	5	19.40	2/11

== Top all-rounder of the tournament ==
		Batting				Bowling			
Name	Matches	Runs	Average	Highest Score	50	Runs	Wickets	Average	Best
Mohammad Hussain (Pak)	4	76	25.33	51	1	97	5	19.40	2/11

== Notes ==
1) The Sri Lanka 'A' team achieved their first and only victory in SAARC Quadrangular history by beating Bangladesh by 5 wickets.

2) The Pak team was unusually generous in giving extra runs. In total, they gave away 120 extras (71 wides, 28 No balls, 28 leg byes and 2 Byes). This a record for the SAARC Quadrangular.

3) Mujtaba's 91 is the 2nd highest score in SAARC Quadrangular history, after Sidhu's unbeaten 95 against Pak 'A' in 1992.

4) Harvinder's 6/43 against Pakistan 'A' is the best bowling in the tournament's history, improving Tanvir Mehedi's 5/23 against Bangladesh in 1992.

5) In the game against Pak 'A', the Bangladesh last wicket pair of Hasibul and Anisur put on unbeaten 51 runs, a tournament record for the 10 wicket partnership.
