= 1994–95 SAARC Quadrangular =

Cricket tournament

- Administrator: SAARC cricket
- Cricket format: 50 overs
- Tournament format: Round-robin
- Champions: India (1st title)
- Participants: 4
- Matches: 7
- Most runs: Navjot Sidhu (139)
- Most wickets: Ajay Sharma (8)

The 2nd SAARC cricket tournament was the second edition of the tournament. It held in Dhaka, Bangladesh in December 1994. Teams from Bangladesh, India, Pakistan, and Sri Lanka participated in the tournament. Bangladesh, still an associate member of the ICC, played their full strength national side, while their neighbors sent their 'A' teams for the tournament. India won the cup after beating Bangladesh in the final. All the matches were 50 overs affair.

== The teams ==
Following the disappointing performances of Bangladesh in the ICC Trophy early that year, there were a number of changes in the team. To begin with Akram Khan took over the captaincy from Faruk Ahmed. In the batting line up, the two youngsters Naimur Rahman and Al Sahariar replaced Faruk and Selim Shahed. Bigger changes occurred in the bowling department. Anisur Rahman and Sajal Chowdhury emerged as the new ball bowlers, while Mohammad Rafique became the new spin bowling partner for Enamul Haque.

The Indian team was led by Pravin Amre. Apart from him, there were a number of players (like Sourav Ganguly, Rahul Dravid, Vikram Rathour, Venkatesh Prasad, Rajesh Chauhan) who either had played for the Indian National team, or were on the brink of wearing national colors. Two of them, Ganguly and Dravid, went on to become Indian captains.

Pakistan cricket was passing through a difficult period at that time, as allegations of match fixing were first brought up. At the same time, the board recalled veteran Rameez Raja to lead the 'A' side. Chandika Hathurusingha was the captain of the Lankan outfit.

== Scores in brief ==
Date	Match	Team 1	Team 2	Result
22 December	Bangladesh Vs. Pakistan	Bangladesh 167/8 (Moni 43*)	Pakistan 168/9 (Ijaz jnr 48, Ashraf 44, Anisur 3/29)	Pakistan wins by 1 wicket
23 December	India Vs. Sri Lanka	India 182 (Dravid 44, V. Yadav 42, Arnold 3/35)	Sri Lanka 138 (Prasad 3/20, Chatterjee 3/20)	India wins by 44 runs
24 December	Bangladesh Vs. Sri Lanka	Sri Lanka 167 (Hathurusingha) 47, Anisur 4/29, Moni 2/29)	Bangladesh 168/5 (Athar 32, Nannu 30*)	Bangladesh wins by 5 wickets
25 December	India Vs. Pakistan	Pakistan 120 (Prashant) 3/23, Chatterjee 3/28)	India 123/6	India wins by 4 wickets
26 December	Bangladesh Vs. India	Bangladesh 172 (Bulbul 64, Prasad 3/25, Vaidya 3/35)	India 171 (Vikram 35, Dravid 33, Rafique 3/25, Anisur 3/28)	Bangladesh wins by 1 run
27 December	Pakistan Vs. Sri Lanka	Sri Lanka 147 (Russel 47, Zafar 5/29)	Pakistan 148/9 (Raja 59, Fazal 41, Chandana 4/22)	Pakistan wins by 1 wicket
28 December	India Vs. Bangladesh (Final)	India 216/6 (Amre 88*, Sourav 39, Dravid 37)	Bangladesh 164 (Akram 66, Prasad 4/11)	India wins by 52 runs

== League matches ==
India, Pakistan and the host Bangladesh all finished the League matches with two wins and one defeat each, but Pakistan lost out on net run rate calculation.

The slow and low bounce of the pitches made stroke play extremely difficult. Nevertheless, there were really close matches. Wicketkeeper Jahangir Alam was the villain for the local side in their last ball defeat at the hands of Pakistan. With the scores tied, he conceded a bye in the last delivery to hand over the match to the visitors. Jahangir, however, made amends in the match against India by stumping Prasad of Rafique. Earlier, Bulbul lived up to his reputation as a fine player of spin bowling by scoring a defiant 64 and leading a late middle order recovery.

Earlier, the holiday crowd on Christmas Day went home disappointed as the clash of the titans, India vs Pakistan, failed to produce a classic encounter. Chatterjee and Vaidya took three wickets a piece to bowl the Paks out for only 120. Prasad, the best bowler of the tournament went wicketless, but bowling miserly he conceded only 13 runs from his nine overs. In the end, India won by four wickets, but actually it was much more convincing than that.

For India, Dravid was the most consistent batsmen. The spinners did well, but the real high point for India in this tournament was the bowling of the two medium pacers, Prasad and Vaidya. For Pakistan, skipper Raja and Zahid Fazal helped their team win the vital match against Sri Lanka, but they could not improve their net run rate enough to reach the finals. Zafar Iqbal, their most impressive bowler, only played in the last match against Sri Lanka. Sri Lanka was very disappointing, although Arnold emerged as a talented allround cricketer.

== The final ==
India 'A'	Bangladesh
Vikram Rathour	Athar Ali Khan
Sourav Ganguly	Jahangir Alam (WK)
Rahul Dravid	Al Sahariar
Pravin Amre (C)	Aminul Islam
Vijay Yadav (WK)	Minhajul Abedin
Sairaj Bahutule	Akram Khan (C)
Prashant Vaidya	Enamul Haq
Utpal Chatterjee	Mohammad Rafique
Salil Ankola	Saiful Islam
Rajesh Chauhan	Sajal Chowdhury
Venkatesh Prasad	Anisur Rahman

Unfortunately, the final was a rather one-sided affair. The game was effectively over after Prasad destroyed the Bangladesh top order to leave the hosts struggling at 4/31. Earlier, skipper Amre had played the best knock of the tournament. Under pressure, after scoring only 14 runs in the three league games, the Indian captain answered his critics in an emphatic manner. Nimble use of foot and crisp timing were the highlights of his match winning innings of 88*. Ganguly, playing his only game in the trophy stroked a classy 39, while Dravid contributed 37.

Skipper Akram led a spirited recovery by sharing 54 with Nannu for the fifth wicket, but by the time Sairaj dismissed the Bangladesh captain for 66, the game was effectively over. Akram's effort was gallant but fruitless.

== Statistics ==
Top batsmen of the tournament
Name	Matches	Runs	Average	Highest score	50				
Pravin Amre (Ind)	4	102	34.00	88*	1				
Rahul Dravid (Ind)	4	130	32.50	44	0				
Akram Khan (Ban)	4	129	32.25	66	1				
Top bowlers of the tournament
Name	Matches	Runs	Wickets	Average	Best				
Venkatesh Prasad (Ind)	4	69	10	6.90	4/11				
Anisur Rahman (Ban)	4	132	11	12.00	4/29				
Top all-rounders of the tournament
Name	Matches	Batting				Bowling			
Name	Matches	Runs	Average	Highest score	50	Runs	Wickets	Average	Best
Russel Arnold (SL)	3	97	32.33	47	0	76	6	12.67	3/35
Enamul Haq (Ban)	4	74	24.67	43*	0	154	5	30.80	2/29
