= 1997 in Bangladesh =

- Centuries: 20th; 21st
- Decades: 1970s; 1980s; 1990s; 2000s; 2010s
- See also: Other events of 1997; List of years in Bangladesh

1997 (MCMXCVII) was a common year starting on Wednesday of the Gregorian calendar, the 1997th year of the Common Era (CE) and Anno Domini (AD) designations, the 997th year of the 2nd millennium, the 97th year of the 20th century, and the 8th year of the 1990s decade.

The year 1997 was the 26th year after the independence of Bangladesh. It was also the second year of the first term of the Government of Sheikh Hasina.

== Incumbents ==
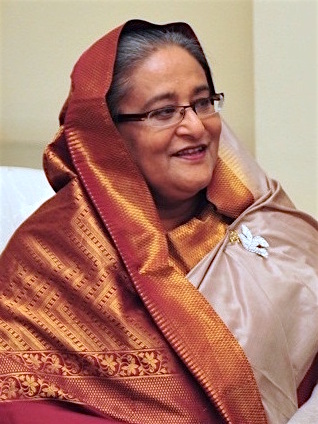
Sheikh
Hasina

- President: Shahabuddin Ahmed
- Prime Minister: Sheikh Hasina
- Chief Justice: A.T.M Afzal

== Demography ==
Demographic Indicators for Bangladesh in 1997
Population, total	120,160,571
Population density (per km^{2})	923.1
Population growth (annual %)	2.1%
Male to Female Ratio (every 100 Female)	106.0
Urban population (% of total)	22.4%
Birth rate, crude (per 1,000 people)	29.5
Death rate, crude (per 1,000 people)	7.6
Mortality rate, under 5 (per 1,000 live births)	103
Life expectancy at birth, total (years)	63.6
Fertility rate, total (births per woman)	3.5

== Climate ==
Climate data for Bangladesh in 1997
Month	Jan	Feb	Mar	Apr	May	Jun	Jul	Aug	Sep	Oct	Nov	Dec	Year
Daily mean °C (°F)	18.1 (64.6)	19.8 (67.6)	25.2 (77.4)	26.0 (78.8)	28.3 (82.9)	28.3 (82.9)	28.1 (82.6)	28.1 (82.6)	27.6 (81.7)	26.0 (78.8)	23.9 (75.0)	18.6 (65.5)	24.9 (76.8)
Average precipitation mm (inches)	9.6 (0.38)	20.3 (0.80)	64.6 (2.54)	142.4 (5.61)	221.1 (8.70)	491.5 (19.35)	474.5 (18.68)	407.0 (16.02)	388.4 (15.29)	52.5 (2.07)	14.3 (0.56)	29.7 (1.17)	2,315.9 (91.17)
Source: Climatic Research Unit (CRU) of University of East Anglia (UEA)

=== Cyclone ===
A powerful cyclone caused widespread damage and loss of life throughout Bangladesh in May. Originating from a near-equatorial trough on 15 May 1997, the cyclone tracked in a general northward direction throughout its existence. The system gradually intensified over the following days, reaching the equivalent of a Category 1 hurricane on the Saffir–Simpson scale by 17 May. The following day, the storm attained its peak intensity with winds of 215 km/h (135 mph) according to the JTWC and 165 km/h (105 mph) according to the IMD along with a barometric pressure of 964 mbar (hPa; 28.47 inHg). On 19 May, the cyclone made landfall near Chittagong, Bangladesh before rapidly dissipating the next day.

== Economy ==
Key Economic Indicators for Bangladesh in 1997
National Income
	Current US$	Current BDT	% of GDP
GDP	$48.2 billion	BDT2,060.0 billion	
GDP growth (annual %)	4.5%		
GDP per capita	$401.5	BDT17,144	
Agriculture, value added	$11.2 billion	BDT478.9 billion	23.2%
Industry, value added	$10.5 billion	BDT450.4 billion	21.9%
Services, etc., value added	$24.1 billion	BDT1,028.7 billion	49.9%
Balance of Payment
	Current US$	Current BDT	% of GDP
Current account balance	-$286.3 million		-.6%
Imports of goods and services	$7,834.4 million	BDT325.6 billion	15.8%
Exports of goods and services	$5,527.2 million	BDT216.7 billion	10.5%
Foreign direct investment, net inflows	$139.4 million		0.3%
Personal remittances, received	$1,526.5 million		3.2%
Total reserves (includes gold) at year end	$1,610.8 million		
Total reserves in months of imports	2.4		

Note: For the year 1997 average official exchange rate for BDT was 43.89 per US$.

== Events ==
- 13 April – Bangladesh national cricket team wins 1997 ICC Trophy and qualifies for cricket world cup 1999.
- 21 November– 23 people were killed in Chittagong when a five-story building collapsed in Bangladesh during an earthquake.
- 2 December – The 'Chittagong Hill Tracts Peace Accord' is signed between Bangladesh government and Parbatya Chattagram Jana Sanghati Samiti.
- 7 December – Over a hundred people are injured during a demonstrations against the signing of peace accord with rebels in the Chittagong Hill Tracts.

=== Awards and Recognitions ===
==== Independence Day Award ====
Recipients	Area	Note
Munshi Siddique Ahmed	science and technology	
Nurul Islam	medical science	
Kabir Chowdhury	education	
Abdul Matin	education	
Sufia Kamal	literature	
Shawkat Osman	literature	
Abdul Alim	music	posthumous
Jahanara Imam	social work	
Syed Mohammad Hossein	social work	
Dhirendranath Datta	language and independence movements	posthumous

==== Ekushey Padak ====
1. Abu Ishaque (literature)
2. Novera Ahmed (sculpture)
3. Nitun Kundu (sculpture)
4. Debu Bhattacharya (music)
5. Runu Biswas (dance)
6. Razia Khan (education)
7. Serajul Huq (education)
8. Shabnam Mustari (music)
9. Santosh Gupta (journalism)
10. Monajatuddin (journalism)
11. Momtazuddin Ahmed (drama)

=== Sports ===
- International football:
  - Bangladesh participated in 1997 South Asian Football Federation Gold Cup held in Nepal, where they exited in the group stage.
- Domestic football:
  - Muktijoddha Sangsad KC won 1997–98 Dhaka Premier Division League title while Mohammedan SC became runner-up.
  - Abahani Ltd. won the title of Bangladesh Federation Cup while Arambagh KS became runner-up.
- Cricket:

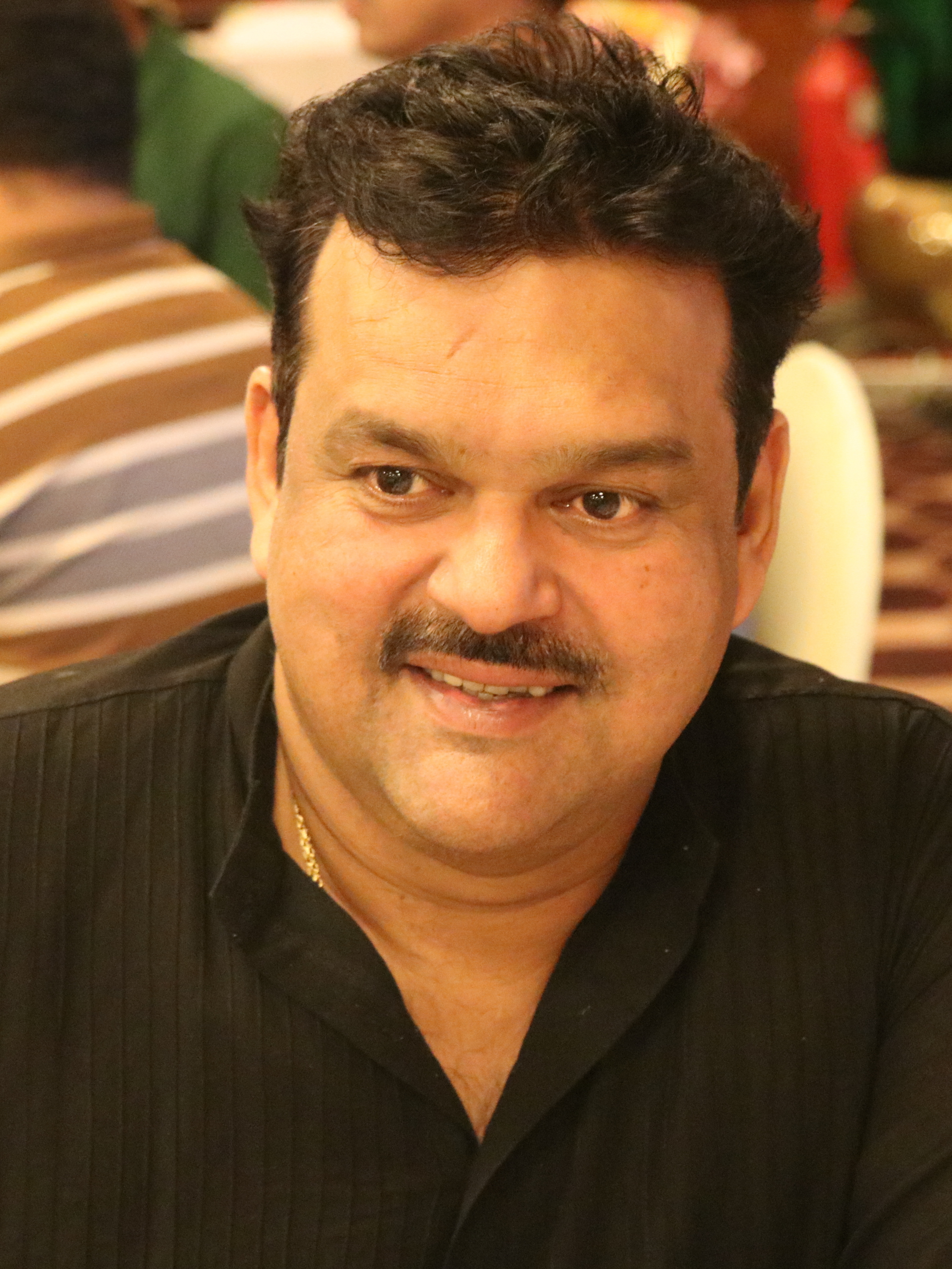
Akram Khan

  - The third and final SAARC Quadrangular was held in Dhaka in February 1997. The Pakistan 'A' team, led by Asif Mujtaba, won the trophy after beating India 'A' in a rain affected final. Bangladesh could not win any matches in this tournament.
  - The 1997 ICC Trophy played in Kuala Lumpur, Malaysia between 24 March and 13 April 1997 was the qualification tournament for the 1999 Cricket World Cup. Bangladesh, captained by Akram Khan (pictured), were the winners of the tournament, defeating Kenya in the final, while Scotland won the third place play-off. These three teams took the three available spots in the World Cup, Bangladesh and Scotland both qualifying for this tournament for the first time.
  - The Bangladesh national cricket team toured New Zealand in November and December 1997 and played four first-class and four List A matches against teams representing the northern, central and southern regions of New Zealand. Bangladesh had been playing List A matches since 1986, but the four first-class matches on this tour were the first first-class matches played by any Bangladeshi team. However, Bangladesh team was not competitive in the longer version of the game against the stronger NZ regional teams.

== Births ==
- 25 October – Mehedy Hasan Miraz, cricketer

== Deaths ==
- 4 January – Akhteruzzaman Elias, author (b. 1943)
- 4 January – A R Mallick, academic (b. 1918)
- 8 July – Abu Sadat Mohammad Sayem, first Chief Justice of Bangladesh, subsequently President of Bangladesh (b. 1916)
- 6 August – Dudu Miyan II, Islamic scholar (b. 1913)
- 26 September – Mafizuddin Ahmed, scientist (b. 1921)
- 4 November – Ranesh Das Gupta, writer, journalist, and politician (b. 1912)
- 1 December – Khan Ataur Rahman, singer, actor, and film director (b. 1928)

== See also ==
- 1990s in Bangladesh
- List of Bangladeshi films of 1997
- Timeline of Bangladeshi history
