= International cricket in 1998 =

Cricket season

The 1998 international cricket season was from April 1998 to September 1998.

== Season overview ==
International tours
Start date	Home team	Away team	Results [Matches]			
Start date	Home team	Away team	Test	ODI	FC	LA
21 May 1998	England	South Africa	2–1 [5]	1–2 [3]	—	—
27 May 1998	Sri Lanka	New Zealand	2–1 [3]	—	—	—
27 August 1998	England	Sri Lanka	0–1 [1]	—	—	—
International tournaments
Start date	Tournament				Winners	
14 May 1998	(India) 1998 Coca-Cola Triangular Series				India	
19 June 1998	(Sri Lanka) 1998 Nidahas Trophy				India	
14 August 1998	(England) 1998 Emirates Triangular Tournament				Sri Lanka	
12 September 1998	(Canada) 1998 'Friendship' Cup				Pakistan	

== May ==
=== Coca-Cola Triangular Series 1998 ===
Team	P	W	L	T	NR	NRR	Points
India	4	3	1	0	0	+0.265	6
Kenya	4	2	2	0	0	+0.362	4
Bangladesh	4	1	3	0	0	−0.662	2

Group stage
No.	Date	Team 1	Captain 1	Team 2	Captain 2	Venue	Result
ODI 1328	14 May	India	Mohammad Azharuddin	Bangladesh	Aminul Islam	Punjab Cricket Association IS Bindra Stadium, Mohali	India by 5 wickets
ODI 1329	17 May	Bangladesh	Akram Khan	Kenya	Aasif Karim	Lal Bahadur Shastri Stadium, Hyderabad	Bangladesh by 6 wickets
ODI 1330	20 May	India	Ajay Jadeja	Kenya	Aasif Karim	M. Chinnaswamy Stadium, Bangalore	India by 4 wickets
ODI 1333	23 May	Bangladesh	Akram Khan	Kenya	Aasif Karim	M. A. Chidambaram Stadium, Chennai	Kenya by 28 runs
ODI 1335	25 May	India	Ajay Jadeja	Bangladesh	Akram Khan	Wankhede Stadium, Mumbai	India by 5 wickets
ODI 1336	28 May	India	Mohammad Azharuddin	Kenya	Aasif Karim	Captain Roop Singh Stadium, Gwalior	Kenya by 69 runs
Final
No.	Date	Team 1	Captain 1	Team 2	Captain 2	Venue	Result
ODI 1337	31 May	India	Mohammad Azharuddin	Kenya	Aasif Karim	Eden Gardens, Culcutta	India by 9 wickets

=== New Zealand in Sri Lanka ===
Test series
No.	Date	Home captain	Away captain	Venue	Result
Test 1415	27–31 May	Arjuna Ranatunga	Stephen Fleming	R. Premadasa Stadium, Colombo	New Zealand by 167 runs
Test 1416	3–7 June	Arjuna Ranatunga	Stephen Fleming	Galle International Stadium, Colombo	Sri Lanka by an innings and 16 runs
Test 1418	10–13 June	Arjuna Ranatunga	Stephen Fleming	Singhalese Sports Club Cricket Ground, Colombo	Sri Lanka by 164 runs

=== South Africa in England ===
Texaco Trophy ODI series
No.	Date	Home captain	Away captain	Venue	Result
ODI 1331	21 May	Adam Hollioake	Hansie Cronje	The Oval, London	South Africa by 3 wickets
ODI 1332	23 May	Adam Hollioake	Hansie Cronje	Old Trafford, Manchester	South Africa by 32 runs
ODI 1334	24 May	Adam Hollioake	Hansie Cronje	Headingley Cricket Ground, Leeds	England by 7 wickets
Test series
No.	Date	Home captain	Away captain	Venue	Result
Test 1417	4–8 June	Alec Stewart	Hansie Cronje	Edgbaston Cricket Ground, Birmingham	Match drawn
Test 1419	18–22 June	Alec Stewart	Hansie Cronje	Lord's, London	South Africa by 10 wickets
Test 1420	2–6 July	Alec Stewart	Hansie Cronje	Old Trafford, Manchester	Match drawn
Test 1421	23–27 July	Alec Stewart	Hansie Cronje	Trent Bridge, Nottingham	England by 8 wickets
Test 1422	30 July–2 August	Alec Stewart	Hansie Cronje	Headingley Cricket Ground, Leeds	England by 23 runs

== June ==
=== 1998 Nidahas Trophy ===
Team	Pld	W	L	NR	T	Pts	NRR
Sri Lanka	6	3	1	2	0	8	+0.623
India	6	1	1	4	0	6	+0.320
New Zealand	6	0	2	4	0	4	–1.429

Group stage
No.	Date	Team 1	Captain 1	Team 2	Captain 2	Venue	Result
ODI 1338	19 June	Sri Lanka	Arjuna Ranatunga	India	Mohammad Azharuddin	R. Premadasa Stadium, Colombo	India by 8 wickets
ODI 1339	21 June	Sri Lanka	Arjuna Ranatunga	New Zealand	Stephen Fleming	R. Premadasa Stadium, Colombo	Sri Lanka by 7 wickets
ODI 1340	23 June	India	Mohammad Azharuddin	New Zealand	Stephen Fleming	R. Premadasa Stadium, Colombo	No result
ODI 1340a	25 June	Sri Lanka	Arjuna Ranatunga	India	Mohammad Azharuddin	Galle International Stadium, Galle	Match abandoned
ODI 1440b	27 June	Sri Lanka	Arjuna Ranatunga	New Zealand	Stephen Fleming	Galle International Stadium, Galle	Match abandoned
ODI 1440c	29 June	India	Mohammad Azharuddin	New Zealand	Stephen Fleming	Galle International Stadium, Galle	Match abandoned
ODI 1341	1 July	Sri Lanka	Arjuna Ranatunga	India	Mohammad Azharuddin	Singhalese Sports Club Cricket Ground, Colombo	Sri Lanka by 8 runs
ODI 1342	3 July	India	Mohammad Azharuddin	New Zealand	Stephen Fleming	Singhalese Sports Club Cricket Ground, Colombo	No result
ODI 1343	5 July	Sri Lanka	Arjuna Ranatunga	New Zealand	Stephen Fleming	Singhalese Sports Club Cricket Ground, Colombo	Sri Lanka by 87 runs
Final
No.	Date	Team 1	Captain 1	Team 2	Captain 2	Venue	Result
ODI 1344	7 July	Sri Lanka	Arjuna Ranatunga	India	Mohammad Azharuddin	R. Premadasa Stadium, Colombo	India by 6 runs

== August ==
=== 1998 Emirates Triangular Tournament ===
Pos	Team	P	W	L	NR	T	Points	NRR
1	England	2	1	1	0	0	2	+0.220
2	Sri Lanka	2	1	1	0	0	2	+0.210
3	South Africa	2	1	1	0	0	2	-0.430

Group stage
No.	Date	Team 1	Captain 1	Team 2	Captain 2	Venue	Result
ODI 1345	14 August	South Africa	Hansie Cronje	Sri Lanka	Arjuna Ranatunga	Trent Bridge, Nottingham	Sri Lanka by 57 runs
ODI 1346	16 August	England	Alec Stewart	Sri Lanka	Arjuna Ranatunga	Lord's, London	England by 36 runs
ODI 1347	18 August	England	Alec Stewart	South Africa	Hansie Cronje	Edgbaston Cricket Ground, Birmingham	South Africa by 14 runs
Final
No.	Date	Team 1	Captain 1	Team 2	Captain 2	Venue	Result
ODI 1348	20 August	England	Alec Stewart	Sri Lanka	Arjuna Ranatunga	Lord's, London	Sri Lanka by 5 wickets

=== Sri Lanka in England ===
One-off Test
No.	Date	Home captain	Away captain	Venue	Result
Test 1423	27–31 August	Alec Stewart	Arjuna Ranatunga	The Oval, London	Sri Lanka by 10 wickets

== September ==
=== 1998 'Friendship' Cup ===
Group stage
No.	Date	Team 1	Captain 1	Team 2	Captain 2	Venue	Result
ODI 1349	12 September	India	Mohammad Azharuddin	Pakistan	Aamer Sohail	Toronto Cricket, Skating and Curling Club, Toronto	India by 6 wickets
ODI 1350	13 September	India	Mohammad Azharuddin	Pakistan	Aamer Sohail	Toronto Cricket, Skating and Curling Club, Toronto	Pakistan by 51 runs
ODI 1351	16 September	India	Mohammad Azharuddin	Pakistan	Aamer Sohail	Toronto Cricket, Skating and Curling Club, Toronto	Pakistan by 77 runs
ODI 1352	19 September	India	Mohammad Azharuddin	Pakistan	Aamer Sohail	Toronto Cricket, Skating and Curling Club, Toronto	Pakistan by 134 runs
ODI 1353	20 September	India	Mohammad Azharuddin	Pakistan	Aamer Sohail	Toronto Cricket, Skating and Curling Club, Toronto	Pakistan by 5 wickets
