= Faruque Ahmed (cricketer) =

Bangladeshi cricketer and official (born 1966)

- ফারুক আহমেদ
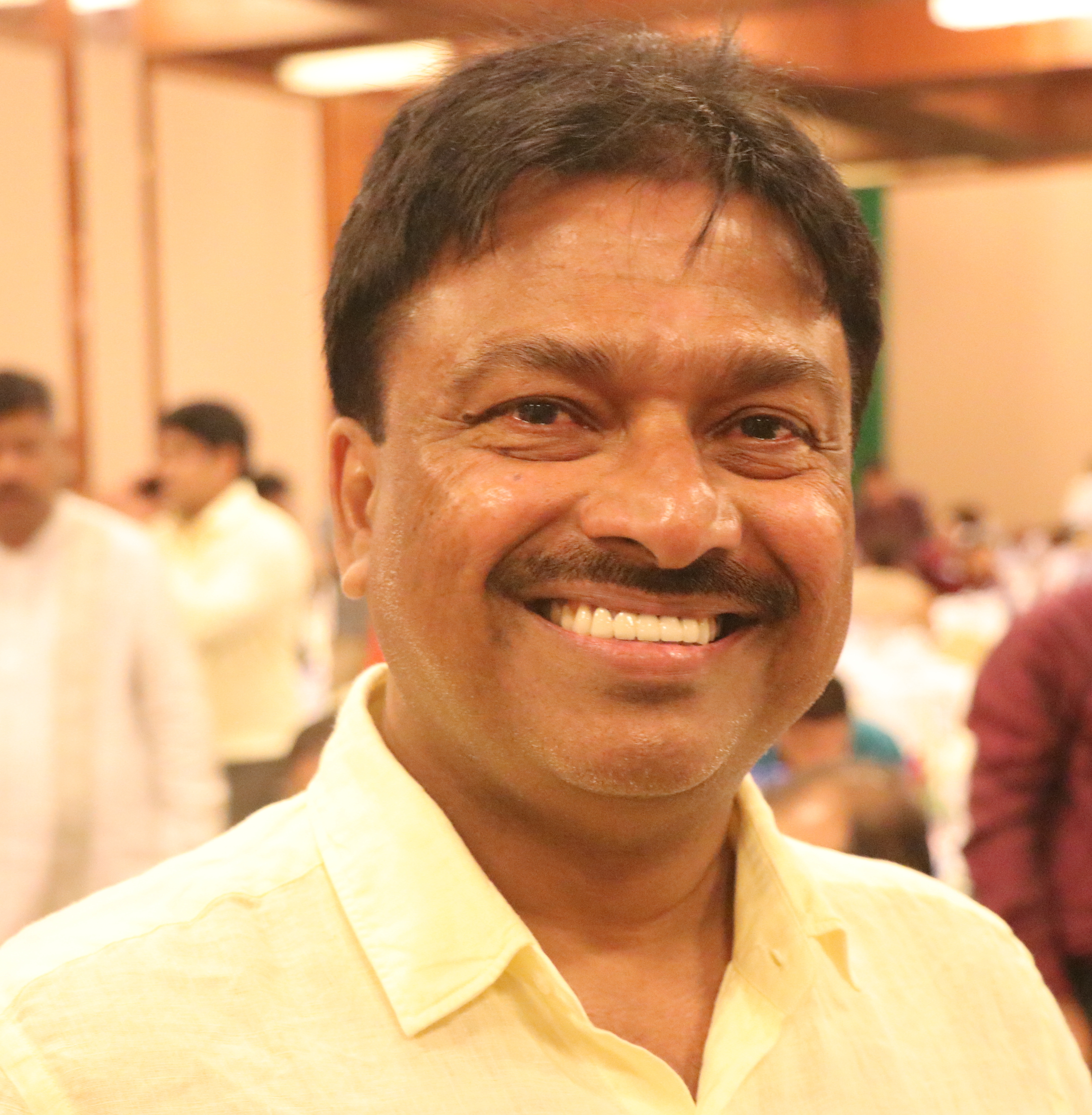
- Ahmed on BCB Iftar program in 2018

President of Bangladesh Cricket Board
- In office 21 August 2024 – 29 May 2025
- Vice President: Nazmul Abedeen Fahim; Fahim Sinha
- Preceded by: Nazmul Hassan
- Succeeded by: Aminul Islam Bulbul

Personal details
- Born: 3 March 1966 (age 60) Dacca- Bikrampur, East Pakistan
- Party: Bangladesh Nationalist Party
- Cricket career

Personal information
- Batting: Right-handed
- Bowling: Right-arm off break
- Relatives: Shahriar Nafees (cousin); Iftekhar Nayem (cousin)

International information
- National side: Bangladesh (1988–1999)
- ODI debut (cap 19): 29 October 1988 v Pakistan
- Last ODI: 27 May 1999 v Australia
- ODI shirt no.: 3

Domestic team information
- Years: Team
- 2000–2001: Biman Bangladesh

Career statistics
Competition	ODI
Matches	7
Runs scored	105
Batting average	15.00
100s/50s	0/1
Top score	57
Catches/stumpings	2/–
- Source: Cricinfo, 13 February 2006

Faruque Ahmed (Bengali: ফারুক আহমেদ) born in Dhaka is a former Bangladeshi cricketer and former president of Bangladesh Cricket Board. He represented the Bangladesh national cricket team from 1988 to 1999.

== In One Day Internationals ==
He made his ODI debut at Chittagong in 1988, against Pakistan. His highest one day score was 57 against India at Chandigarh in 1990. There he put on a 108-run partnership for the 3rd wicket with Athar Ali Khan.

== In ICC Trophy ==
Ahmed also played in two ICC Trophy tournaments, in 1990 and 1994. He scored 56 against Canada in 1990. There he shared a match-winning partnership of 121 with Man of the Match Nurul Abedin (105). Overall, he scored 69 runs in 3 innings (Avg. 23.00). Four years later, leading the side, he had a disappointing time with the bat in Kenya. He scored 114 runs at an average of 19.00.

== Career ==
=== As a captain ===
In the domestic circuit, Ahmed proved himself as a successful captain very early in his career. This prompted the national selectors to make him the Bangladesh captain for the 1993–94 season. This however, didn't turn out to be a very good decision. Specially, in the 1994 ICC Trophy in Kenya, dissatisfaction among senior players combined with injury to key players meant that Bangladesh failed to reach the Semis despite being one of the pre-tournament favorites.

After the 94 ICC Trophy, not only did Ahmed lose his captaincy, he also lost his place in the side. Nevertheless, he showed great courage to win back his place in the side as a top order batsman. He was one of the members of the Bangladesh side in the 1999 WC in England. He, however, failed to impress there, and retired afterward.

=== As cricket administrator ===
After retirement from cricket as a player, he has continued to serve Bangladesh cricket as an administrator. He has served as a national selector. On 21 August 2024, he has been appointed as the president of Bangladesh Cricket Board. On 29 May 2025, the sports ministry of Bangladesh removed him from the post of board president. On 7 October 2025, he was elected as a vice-president of BCB.

Preceded by Minhajul Abedin	Bangladeshi cricket Captains; 1993–1994	Succeeded by Akram Khan
Preceded by Gazi Ashraf	Bangladeshi ICC Trophy Captains; 1994	Succeeded by Akram Khan
