= Iftekhar Nayem =

Bangladeshi cricketer (born 1988)

Personal information
- Full name: Iftekhar Nayem Ahmed
- Born: 20 November 1988 (age 37); Barisal, Bangladesh
- Batting: Right-handed
- Bowling: Right-arm slow-medium
- Relatives: Shahriar Nafees (brother); Faruk Ahmed (cousin)
- Source: ESPNcricinfo, 29 August 2020

Iftekhar Nayem Ahmed (Bengali: ইফতেখার নাঈম আহমেদ; born 20 November 1988) is a Bangladeshi cricketer. He made his List A debut for Barisal Division in the 2006–07 National Cricket League One-Day on 27 March 2007. He made his Twenty20 debut for the Barisal Division in the 8th Bangladesh Games on 22 April 2013.
