= Nazmul Abedeen Fahim =

Bangladeshi cricket coach

Nazmul Abedeen Fahim is a Bangladeshi sports organizer, coach, and director of the Bangladesh Cricket Board. He is the chairperson of cricket operations of the Bangladesh Cricket Board. He has been described as the "'Guru' of Bangladesh batting". He is a childhood mentor of Shakib Al Hasan, former captain of the Bangladesh Cricket Team.

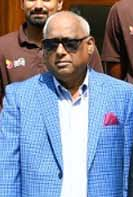
Fahim in 2024

== Career ==
Fahim Joined the Bangladesh Cricket Board in October 2005 after leaving Bangladesh Krira Shikkha Protishtan. He was appointed the senior coach of the High-performance unit. He was the head coach of the Bangladesh national under-19 cricket team. Fahim was a mentor to Bangladeshi cricket star Shakib Al Hasan. He was a councillor of the Bangladesh Cricket Board while serving in the Bangladesh Krira Shikkha Protishtan. He resigned from Bangladesh Cricket Board in September 2019.

Fahim contested the 2021 Bangladesh Cricket Board election but lost to Khaled Mahmud Sujon. He served as the coach of Fortune Barishal. He also served as the batting consultant for the team.

After the fall of the Sheikh Hasina led Awami League government, Fahim announced his intention to reform the Bangladesh Cricket Board on 10 August 2024. The National Sports Council nominated Fahim and Faruque Ahmed to the board of directors of Bangladesh Cricket Board replacing Mohammad Jalal Yunus and Sajjadul Alam Bobby. Yunus had resigned, while Bobby had rejected pressures to resign and accused the government of interfering in the operations of the Bangladesh Cricket Board. It marked the end of the Bangladesh Cricket Board era under Nazmul Hassan Papon.

Fahim had a public falling out with the President of the Bangladesh Cricket Board, Faruque Ahmed, over leading cricket operations of the board. Faruque later attributed it to a miscommunication and stated all issues between them had been resolved through talking. He is the member secretary of the Bangladesh Premier League. His proposals for reforms to the constitution of the Bangladesh Cricket Board have faced pushback from club cricket players.

In February 2025, Fahim lashed out at reporters during a press conference when asked about the absence of Mashrafe Bin Mortaza and Shakib Al Hasan, former members of parliament from the Awami League, in a former captains' meeting. Instead of giving a clear answer, he dodged the questions, showed visible irritation, and abruptly ended the presser. His reaction was viewed as part of the Bangladesh Cricket Board's ongoing struggle with transparency and handling media scrutiny.

In November 2026, Fahim joined the National Citizens' Party.
