= Vasoo Paranjape =

Indian cricketer (1938–2021)

Personal information
- Full name: Vasudeo Jagannath Paranjape
- Born: 21 November 1938; Mahesana, Gujarat, British Raj
- Died: 30 August 2021 (aged 82); Mumbai, Maharashtra
- Batting: Right-handed
- Relatives: Jatin Paranjpe (son)

Domestic team information
- Years: Team
- Mumbai
- Baroda

Career statistics
Competition	FC
Matches	29
Runs scored	785
Batting average	23.78
100s/50s	2/2
Top score	127
Balls bowled	486
Wickets	9
Bowling average	36.00
5 wickets in innings	0
10 wickets in match	0
Best bowling	4/49
Catches/stumpings	13/0

Vasudeo Jagannath Paranjape (21 November 1938 – 30 August 2021) was an Indian cricketer and cricket coach. His son Jatin Paranjpe was also a cricketer who later became national selector.

== Career ==
Paranjape played 29 first-class matches between 1956 and 1970 for Mumbai and Baroda. He was part of the Mumbai side which won the Ranji Trophy on 12 occasions. He ended his first-class career with 785 runs with a best score of 127 against Baroda which came during the 1964 Ranji Trophy.

After his retirement from cricket, he became a mentor and administrator. He was well known for his role as a mentor to several high-profile Indian cricketers such as Sunil Gavaskar, Dilip Vengsarkar, Sachin Tendulkar, Sanjay Manjrekar, Sourav Ganguly, Rahul Dravid, Yuvraj Singh and Rohit Sharma. His mentorship and leadership skills had significantly influenced these players to have a prolific cricketing career.

He also served as a coach at National Cricket Academy and was one of the first choice coaches when the National Cricket Academy was inaugurated in 2000. He also coached Dadar Union, India U-19 national team, Maharashtra and Bombay teams. He was appointed as director of coaching by the Board of Control for Cricket in India in 1980s and served as head coach of Indian junior cricketers in camps. He served as the head coach of Indian U-19 team at the 1988 Youth Cricket World Cup which was also the inaugural edition of the Under-19 Cricket World Cup.

== Death ==
Paranjape died on 30 August 2021 in his residence in Mumbai at the age of 82 due to age related illness.

== Legacy ==
His son Jatin co-authored a book along with cricket journalist Anand Vasu titled Cricket Drona: For the Love of Vasoo Paranjape which was based on the life story of Vasudeo Paranjape. The book Cricket Drona which also includes essays from cricketers Sachin Tendulkar, Rahul Dravid and Sunil Gavaskar was officially released on 2 September 2020 and was published by Penguin.

On 2 September 2021, Indian players wore black armbands as a tribute to him during the first day of the fourth test match of the series between India and England.

== See also ==
- List of Mumbai cricketers
- List of Baroda cricketers
