= Mafizur Rahman =

Bangladeshi cricketer (born 1978)

Personal information
- Born: 10 November 1978 (age 48); Madaripur, Bangladesh
- Batting: Right-handed
- Bowling: Right-arm fast-medium

International information
- National side: Bangladesh
- ODI debut (cap 33): 22 July 1997 v Sri Lanka
- Last ODI: 15 October 1997 v Kenya
- Source: ESPNcricinfo, 13 February 2006

Mafizur Rahman (born 10 November 1978) is a former Bangladeshi cricketer who played in four One Day Internationals in 1997.
