= Mahmood Hamid =

Pakistani cricketer (born 1969)

Personal information
- Born: 19 January 1969 (age 57); Karachi, Sindh, Pakistan
- Batting: Right-handed
- Bowling: Right-arm fast-medium
- Role: All-rounder

International information
- National side: Pakistan
- ODI debut (cap 100): 11 April 1995 v Sri Lanka
- Last ODI: 11 April 1995 v Sri Lanka

Career statistics
Competition	ODI	FC	LA
Matches	1	177	127
Runs scored	1	9,438	2,501
Batting average	1.00	41.94	28.42
100s/50s	0/0	22/48	1/9
Top score	1	208	135
Balls bowled	–	1,521	2,328
Wickets	–	14	64
Bowling average	–	57.35	29.78
5 wickets in innings	–	0	0
10 wickets in match	–	0	0
Best bowling	–/–	2/26	3/14
Catches/stumpings	0/–	148/–	46/–
- Source: , 3 May 2006

Mahmood Hamid (born January 19, 1969, Karachi, Sindh) is a Pakistani former cricketer who played one One Day International (ODI) in 1995. He scored one run before being run out. In February 2020, he was named in Pakistan's squad for the Over-50s Cricket World Cup in South Africa. However, the tournament was cancelled during the third round of matches due to the coronavirus pandemic.
