= Sajjad Ahmed (Bangladeshi cricketer) =

Bangladeshi cricketer (born 1974)

Personal information
- Born: 20 May 1974 (age 52); Dhaka, Bangladesh
- Nickname: Shipon
- Batting: Right-handed
- Bowling: Right-arm offbreak

International information
- National side: Bangladesh
- ODI debut (cap 28): 5 April 1995 v India
- Last ODI: 6 April 1995 v Sri Lanka

Career statistics
Competition	ODI	FC
Matches	2	33
Runs scored	15	1,282
Batting average	7.50	25.64
100s/50s	0/0	1/6
Top score	11	117
Balls bowled	–	243
Wickets	–	6
Bowling average	–	31.66
5 wickets in innings	–	0
10 wickets in match	–	0
Best bowling	–	3/42
Catches/stumpings	0/0	25/0
- Source: Cricinfo, 26 September 2014

Sajjad Ahmed (born 20 May 1974) is a Bangladeshi former cricketer who played in two One Day Internationals in 1995.

He was only 19 when he was selected to open against Zimbabwe at Dhaka in autumn 1993. Though these games were not recognized as full ODIs, they were important for Bangladesh's preparation for the 5th ICC Trophy in Kenya. Unfortunately, the young opener couldn't handle the pace of Heath Streak. He did play two full ODIs in 1995, but after scores of 4 and 11, was omitted from the national team.

He played first-class cricket for Dhaka Metropolis and Dhaka Division from 2001 to 2006. He scored his only first-class century (117) for Dhaka Metropolis in a victory over Barisal Division in 2000–01.
