= Munshi Siddique Ahmad =

Bangladeshi rice scientist

- Born: 1923 or 1924
- Died: 19 October 2011 (aged 87)
- Education: University of Dhaka; Texas A&M University
- Scientific career
- Fields: Genetics and plant breeding
- Workplaces: BRRI

Munshi Siddique Ahmad (Bengali: মুন্সী সিদ্দিক আহমদ; c. 1924 – 19 October 2011) was a Bangladeshi rice scientist. He served as the associate director of the Bangladesh Rice Research Institute (BRRI). He developed BRRI Shail (BR4), which was responsible for increasing rice production – from 8 million tons in 1965 to 20 million tons in 1975. In 1997, he earned Independence Day Award in the science and technology category from the Government of Bangladesh.

== Education ==
Ahmad passed ISc from Government Rajendra College, Faridpur, in 1946. He then moved to Dhaka and got admitted into The Bengal Agricultural Institute (Present Sher-e-Bangla Agricultural University) under the University of Dhaka. He graduated from the college in 1949, and completed his master's degree in agriculture from the University of Dhaka in crop botany in 1956. In 1968, he earned his Ph.D. degree in plant genetics from Texas A&M University.

== Career ==
Ahmad served as the head of the breeding division at BRRI. He developed more than 30 new varieties of HYV (high-yielding varieties) rice, e.g. BR3, BR4, BR10, and BR11.

== Awards ==
- Kazi Mahbubullah Trust Gold Medal
- Independence Day Award (1997)
- Begum Jebunsessa and Kazi Mahbubullah Trust Award (1986)
- Bangabandhu Award (1974)

In 1969, Siddique Ahmad was awarded the Tamgha-e-Pakistan, but he renounced it in March 1971, during the non-cooperation movement against the-then Government of Pakistan. Besides, under his leadership, the breeding division of BRRI received the President's Award in 1977 and the FAO Bronze Plaque in 1980.
