= Harvinder Singh (cricketer) =

Indian cricketer (born 1977)

Personal information
- Born: 23 December 1977 (age 48); Amritsar, Punjab, India
- Batting: Right-handed
- Bowling: Right-arm fast-medium

International information
- National side: India
- Test debut (cap 215): 6 March 1998 v Australia
- Last Test: 22 August 2001 v Sri Lanka
- ODI debut (cap 106): 13 September 1997 v Pakistan
- Last ODI: 17 October 2001 v Kenya

Career statistics
Competition	Test	ODI
Matches	3	16
Runs scored	6	6
Batting average	2.00	1.50
100s/50s	0/0	0/0
Top score	6	3*
Balls bowled	273	686
Wickets	4	24
Bowling average	46.25	25.37
5 wickets in innings	0	0
10 wickets in match	0	0
Best bowling	2/62	3/44
Catches/stumpings	0/–	6/–
- Source: ESPNcricinfo, 4 February 2006

Harvinder Singh (born 23 December 1977) is an Indian cricketer who played in three Test matches and 16 One Day International (ODI) matches from 1997 to 2001.

Harvinder made his debut in ODI cricket for India against Pakistan during the 1997 Sahara Cup in Toronto. In 2020, he became an Indian national selector.
