= Utpal Chatterjee =

Indian cricketer (born 1964)

Cricket information
- Batting: Left-handed
- Bowling: Slow left-arm orthodox
Medal record
Men's Cricket
Representing India
ACC Asia Cup
Winner	1995 United Arab Emirates
- Source: CricInfo, 6 March 2006

Utpal Chatterjee (born 13 July 1964) is a former Indian cricketer. He was a left arm spinner and a low order batsman. He had his early education at the Shyambazar A.V School and Calcutta Boys' School in Kolkata, India.

He played domestic cricket for Bengal and played three One Day Internationals for India in 1995. He was a part of the Indian squad which won the 1995 Asia Cup. He is the only cricketer ever from Bengal to have picked up more than 500 first class wickets. He picked up 52 wickets in the ranji trophy' season of 1999–2000. He retired in 2004 with 504 first class wickets to his credit.

Since 4 September 2008, he has been the head coach of Bengal cricket team.
