= Naveed Nawaz =

Sri Lankan cricketer and coach

Personal information
- Full name: Mohamed Naveed Nawaz
- Born: 20 September 1973 (age 53); Colombo
- Batting: Left-handed
- Bowling: Legbreak

International information
- National side: Sri Lanka (1998–2002)
- Only Test (cap 132): 28 July 2002 v Bangladesh
- ODI debut (cap 94): 26 January 1998 v Zimbabwe
- Last ODI: 30 June 2002 v India

Head coaching information
- Years: Team
- 2018–2020: Bangladesh u19
- 2024–present: Bangladesh u19

Career statistics
Competition	Test	ODI	FC	LA
Matches	1	3	131	97
Runs scored	99	31	6,892	2,346
Batting average	99.00	15.50	36.27	31.63
100s/50s	0/1	0/0	12/42	31/57
Top score	78*	15*	152*	120
Balls bowled	–	–	716	105
Wickets	–	–	17	2
Bowling average	–	–	26.88	28.50
5 wickets in innings	–	–	1	1
10 wickets in match	–	–	0	0
Best bowling	–	–	5/16	1/13
Catches/stumpings	0/–	0/–	103/–	30/–
Medal record
Representing Bangladesh as Coach
U-19 World Cup
Winner	2020 South Africa
U-19 Asia Cup
Winner	2024 UAE
- Source: Cricinfo, 9 February 2017

Mohamed Naveed Nawaz (Tamil: நவீட் நவாஸ்; born 20 September 1973), is a former Sri Lankan cricketer. He was a left-handed batsman and a leg-break bowler who played one Test and 3 One-Day Internationals for Sri Lanka. He is appointed as under-19 coach of Bangladesh. Under the coaching of Nawaz, in The 2020 ICC Under-19 Cricket World Cup Bangladesh beat India by three wickets to win the tournament.

== School times ==
During his school days for D.S. Senanayake College, Colombo he won the Sri Lanka's School Boy Cricketer of the Year in 1993.

== Domestic career ==
For his long term club teams Bloomfield and later NCC, he plied his trade for many years as a regular number 3 batsman playing alongside Sri Lankan names like Sanath Jayasuriya, Aravinda De Silva, Hashan Tillekaratne and Kumar Sangakkara. His first class average was 40 and he got an opportunity to showcase this in 2002 almost 5 years after his first international ODI appearance and many years after his first ever international tour with Arjuna Rantunga's team to the Caribbean as a benchwarmer. Despite this he came out of that one Test match with a test average of 99 which remains his average to this day as he was once again shelved. He made his Twenty20 debut on 17 August 2004, for Nondescripts Cricket Club in the 2004 SLC Twenty20 Tournament.

== International career ==
Nawaz has played only one Test, against Bangladesh. He had played for his club team for several years before an international appearance had been forthcoming, his first and only international match taking place in July 2002, and in 2004 Nawaz ventured into Twenty-20 cricket.

In 2004, he was appointed as the captain of Sri Lanka A team when the team toured New Zealand.

== After cricket ==
Naveed Nawaz retired from International and domestic cricket in 2005 and ventured into the field of coaching first-class cricket in Sri Lanka. He was player-cum-coach of Nondescript cricket club, head coach of Moors Sports club and he has done a good job as the head coach with one of Sri Lanka's cricket clubs; the Sinhalese Sports Club. His latest contract is as an assistant head coach of Sri Lanka National team for 2 years from 2022. He is now visiting Bangladesh with the team of Sri Lanka in the Bangladesh-Sri Lanka Test series 2022.

In 2007/08 Naveed Nawaz was head coach of the Fingara International cricket academy (FICA), an academy that is owned by a privately held company in Sri Lanka.

In 2009, Naveed Nawaz was appointed as consultant coach for the Sri Lanka women's team and accompanied them in the Women's world cup in Australia and t-20 cup in England.

In 2009, Sri Lanka Cricket (SLC) appointed Naveed Nawaz the Head coach of the Sri Lanka National under-19 team.

=== Bangladesh under-19 Cricket ===
in 2018, 16 July, Nawaz was appointed as under-19 coach of Bangladesh. Bangladesh Youth's ended as Runners up in the 2019 ACC Asia under 19 tournament which was held in Sri Lanka under his purview. During the tournament Bangladesh u19 team was able to beat hosts to ended as table toppers of group A. Under the coaching of Nawaz, in The 2020 ICC Under-19 Cricket World Cup Bangladesh beat India by three wickets to win the tournament. It was the Bangladesh' men's first finals win in an ICC event at any level.

=== Sri Lanka ===
On 17 April 2022, he was appointed as assistant coach for Sri Lanka national cricket team for two years.
