= Zakir Hasan (cricketer, born 1972) =

Bangladeshi cricketer (born 1972)

Personal information
- Born: 1 December 1972 (age 53); Mymensingh, Bangladesh
- Batting: Right-handed
- Bowling: Right-arm fast-medium

International information
- National side: Bangladesh
- Only ODI (cap 34): 24 July 1997 v India

Career statistics
Competition	ODI
Matches	1
Runs scored	–
Batting average	–
100s/50s	–
Top score	–
Balls bowled	12
Wickets	0
Bowling average	–
5 wickets in innings	–
10 wickets in match	–
Best bowling	–
Catches/stumpings	0/–
- Source: Cricinfo, 16 March 2023

Mohammad Zakir Hasan (born 1 December 1972 in Dhaka) is a former Bangladeshi cricketer who played in a single One Day International in 1997.
