= B. K. Sadashiva =

Indian cricket umpire (born 1946)

Personal information
- Born: 6 December 1946 (age 79); Mysore, India
- Died: 30 September 2020
- Role: Umpire

Umpiring information
- ODIs umpired: 2 (1998–1999)
- Source: ESPNcricinfo, 29 May 2014

B. K. Sadashiva (born 6 December 1946) is a former Indian cricket umpire. He stood in two ODI games in 1998 and 1999.

== See also ==
- List of One Day International cricket umpires
