= Jatin Paranjpe =

Indian cricketer (born 1972)

Personal information
- Full name: Jatin Vasudeo Paranjape
- Batting: Left-handed
- Bowling: Slow left-arm orthodox

Career statistics
Competition	ODI	FC	LA
Matches	4	62	44
Runs scored	54	3,964	1,040
Batting average	18.00	46.09	35.86
100s/50s	0/0	13/15	2/3
Top score	27	218	116*
Catches/stumpings	2/–	54/–	8/–
- Source: ESPNcricinfo, 19 October 2020

Jatin Paranjpe (born 17 April 1972) is an Indian cricketer. He is a left-handed batsman and a slow left-arm orthodox bowler.

Jatin Paranjape was born in a family associated with cricket. Vasoo Paranjape, Jatin's father, was a former Ranji Trophy player in 1960s and a renowned coach at the National Cricket Academy. Jatin is married to Gandhali Bendre, sister of Sonali Bendre. Jatin Paranjpe was a middle-order batsman who played briefly at the international level in 1998, before an ankle injury forced him out of the national team. It took Jatin seven years from his Ranji debut in 1991/92 season to get the attention of the national selectors. He made a total of 606 runs in four Ranji trophy outings and guaranteed himself a place in the national team. He was part of the India "A" tour of Pakistan where he did not perform well. Another solitary ODI appearance came in a triangular series involving Kenya and Bangladesh.

He made a run-a-ball unbeaten 23 in the Sahara cup in Toronto to steer India to victory in the opening match. Two games later he hurt his ankle in the field and was forced to fly back home. He has been confined to domestic cricket ever since. He made 652 runs at an average of 50.15 in the 1999/2000 season, but failed to gain the attention of the selectors. After being based in Netherlands for Nike Football, Jatin returned to India with Nike Cricket in 2014.

He was a member of the India national selection panel in 2016 and 2017.
