= Nilesh Kulkarni =

Indian cricketer (born 1973)

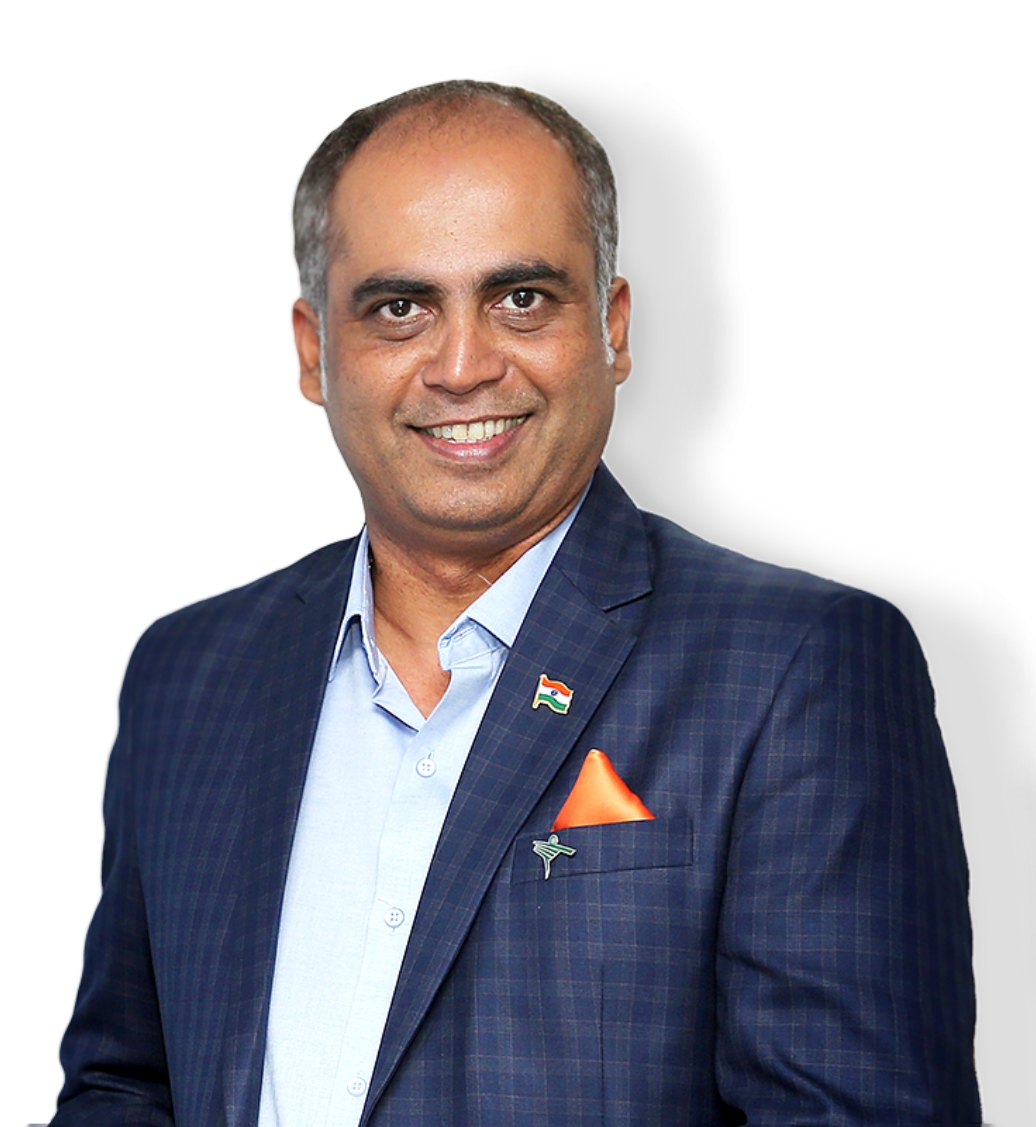

Personal information
- Born: 3 April 1973 (age 53); Dombivli, Maharashtra, India
- Height: 193 cm (6 ft 4 in)
- Batting: Left-handed
- Bowling: Slow left arm orthodox
- Role: Bowler

International information
- National side: India
- Test debut (cap 212): 2 August 1997 v Sri Lanka
- Last Test: 18 March 2001 v Australia
- ODI debut (cap 105): 26 July 1997 v Sri Lanka
- Last ODI: 28 May 1998 v Kenya

Career statistics
Competition	Test	ODI
Matches	3	10
Runs scored	5	11
Batting average	5.00	5.50
100s/50s	0/0	0/0
Top score	4	5*
Balls bowled	738	402
Wickets	2	11
Bowling average	166.00	32.45
5 wickets in innings	0	0
10 wickets in match	0	0
Best bowling	1/70	3/27
Catches/stumpings	1/–	2/–
Medal record
Men's Cricket
Representing India
ACC Asia Cup
Runner-up	1997 Sri Lanka
- Source: ESPNcricinfo, 4 October 2018

Nilesh Moreshwar Kulkarni (born 3 April 1973) is a former Indian cricketer. He is a slow left-arm bowler and left-handed lower order batsman who stood large at 6 ft 4 inches (193 cm).

Kulkarni was one of the many Mumbai players that got picked for India during Sachin Tendulkar's tenure as captain. Kulkarni wrote himself into cricketing history by taking a wicket with the first ball that he bowled in Test cricket, becoming the first Indian bowler, and the twelfth bowler overall, to do so. This was in the Test at Colombo against Sri Lanka in 1997–98. He took the wicket of Marvan Attapattu of his first delivery in Test cricket. However Sri Lanka went on to score 952 runs in that game which was a world record at the time.

Kulkarni has spent all his first-class career with Mumbai taking over 300 wickets with best figures of 7/60 against Andhra in 2004. Kulkarni played for Old Hamptonians CC in the Surrey Championship in the UK during the 2007 and 2008 seasons. Kulkarni retired From International & First Class Cricket on 28 July 2010.

Kulkarni is the Founder Director of International Institute of Sports & Management, a Sports Management institute in Mumbai. IISM was the proud recipient of Rashtriya Khel Protsahan Puraskar 2020 conferred by the Hon. President of India Ram Nath Kovindji.

Member of CII's SPORTSCOM Industry Confederation
