= Zafar Iqbal (cricketer) =

Pakistani cricketer (born 1969)

Personal information
- Born: 6 March 1969 (age 57); Karachi, Sindh, Pakistan
- Batting: Right-handed
- Bowling: Right-arm medium-fast
- Source: Cricinfo, 3 May 2006

Zafar Iqbal Chaudhry (born 6 March 1969) is a former Pakistani cricketer who played eight One Day Internationals in 1995.
