= Enamul Haque (cricketer, born 1966) =

Bangladeshi cricketer

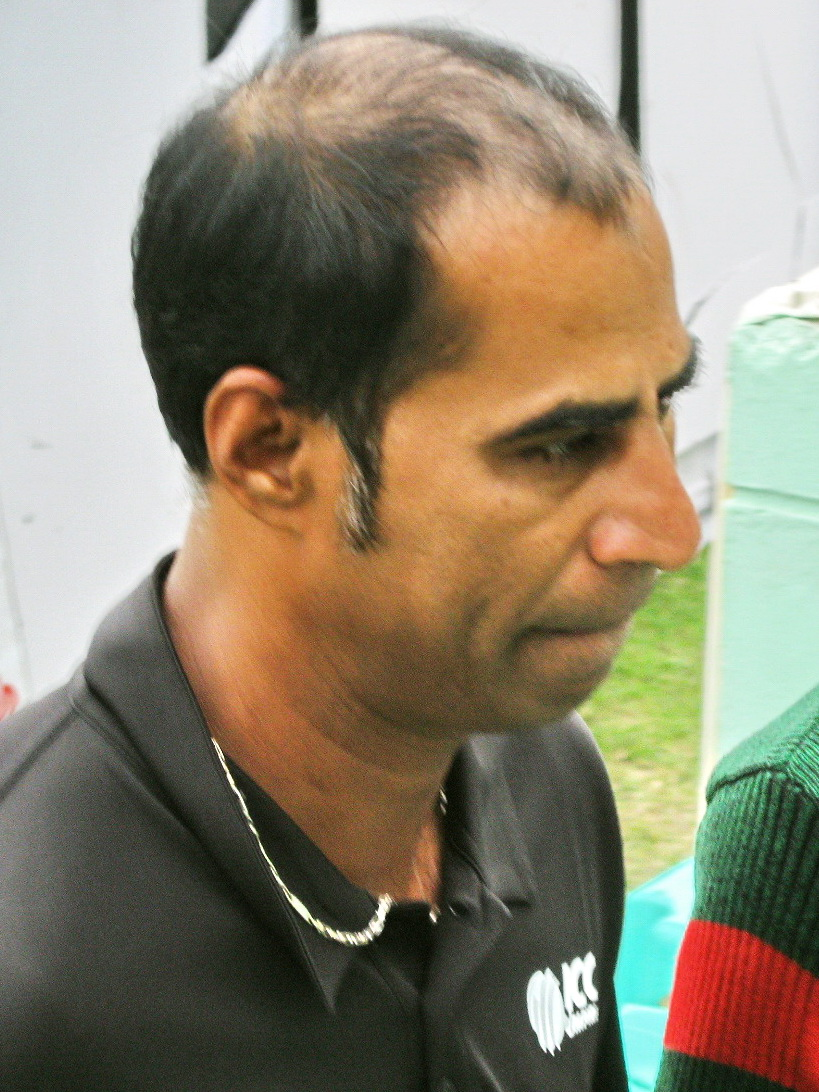
- Enamul Haque in 2009

Personal information
- Full name: Enamul Haque Moni
- Born: 27 February 1966 (age 60); Comilla, Chittagong, East Pakistan
- Batting: Left-handed
- Bowling: Slow left-arm orthodox
- Role: Bowler, Umpire

International information
- National side: Bangladesh (1990–2003)
- Test debut (cap 16): 26 April 2001 v Zimbabwe
- Last Test: 24 April 2003 v South Africa
- ODI debut (cap 21): 28 April 1990 v New Zealand
- Last ODI: 25 January 2002 v Pakistan
- ODI shirt no.: 4 (previously 6)

Umpiring information
- Tests umpired: 1 (2012)
- ODIs umpired: 54 (2006–2015)
- T20Is umpired: 14 (2006–2016)
- WODIs umpired: 4 (2011)

Career statistics
| Competition | Tests | ODIs | FC |
|---|---|---|---|
| Matches | 10 | 29 | 34 |
| Runs scored | 180 | 236 | 1033 |
| Batting average | 12.00 | 11.23 | 24.02 |
| 100s/50s | 0/0 | 0/0 | 0/6 |
| Top score | 24* | 32 | 81 |
| Balls bowled | 2230 | 1238 | 8373 |
| Wickets | 18 | 19 | 129 |
| Bowling average | 57.05 | 57.00 | 26.54 |
| 5 wickets in innings | 0 | 0 | 9 |
| 10 wickets in match | 0 | n/a | 4 |
| Best bowling | 4/136 | 2/40 | 7/74 |
| Catches/stumpings | 1/– | 6/– | 25/– |
- Source: Cricinfo, 15 July 2021

Enamul Haque Moni (Bengali: এনামুল হক মণি; born 27 February 1966), also known as Enamul Haq Moni, is a Bangladeshi former cricketer who played in 10 Tests and 29 One Day Internationals (ODIs) from 1990 to 2003. After retiring from competitive cricket, he became an umpire, and made his first appearance in an ODI between Bangladesh and Zimbabwe on 3 December 2006. He is the first Bangladeshi Test cricketer to umpire in international cricket.

== Early years ==
Moni first came to prominence in the 1988–89 season, as he helped Bangladesh Biman cricket team to the Dhaka league title. He was selected for the national side next season, and remained an integral part of the team for more than a decade. Though he failed to impress at the highest level, he was a lot more successful against the lesser lights.

== In ICC Trophy ==
Though he was an all-rounder, he was most successful with his bowling in ICC Trophy cricket. In total, he took 35 wickets in three ICC Trophy tournaments, in 1990, 1994 and 1997. His most memorable match was the 2nd round encounter against Denmark in the 1990 ICC Trophy. Batting first, the Danes reached 233/9 from their 60 overs. In reply, the Chittagong trio Nurul Abedin (85), Akram Khan (50), and Minhajul Abedin (37) kept Bangladesh in the hunt; but it was Moni's quickfire 17* and his explosive hitting in the final over, that took Bangladesh to the target, with 2 balls to spare. With the ball, Enamul Haque took 2/26 from 12 overs; and he was the obvious choice for the MOM award. In contrast, his biggest disappointment came in Feb. 1994, in the do-or-die game against the hosts Kenya at Nairobi. The hosts batted first, scoring 295/6 from 50 overs, thanks mainly to Maurice Odumbe's 119. In reply, Bangladesh started the chase well, with the opening pair of Jahangir Alam and Aminul Islam Bulbul putting on a 139-run partnership. After that, Minhajul Abedin contributed 68, but Moni fell for a duck, at a crucial stage of the match, and eventually Kenya won by 13 runs.

== Memorable innings ==
In Feb. 1992, he scored a memorable 131 against the touring West Bengal side in a 3-day match at Dhaka. Batting first the tourists scored 384/5 (decl.) left-handed No. 3 Raja Venkat scored 154, another more well known left-hander Sourav Ganguly made 129. In reply, the home side was struggling at 77/4. At this stage, Moni entered the wicket. With ever reliable Aminul Islam, he put on 104 for the 5th wicket. There was good understanding between the two, as they were involved in a number of vital partnerships down the order for Bangladesh. Aminul Islam went for 55, but Moni carried on ruthlessly demolishing the opposition bowling. Bangladesh eventually reached 302, thanks mainly to 131 by Moni. Aided by the tail enders, he went after the WB bowling. He was especially harsh on the slow bowlers, lofting them for a number of sixes. As the national stadium crowd were basking in afternoon sunshine (it was early spring), they also enjoyed batting of the highest class.

== Partnership with Aminul Islam ==
Early on in his career, Moni partnered with another all-rounder Aminul Islam Bulbul. As Bulbul moved up the batting order, he concentrated more on his batting, and less on his bowling. Then in December 1994, Mohammad Rafique emerged as a new all-rounder for the national side.

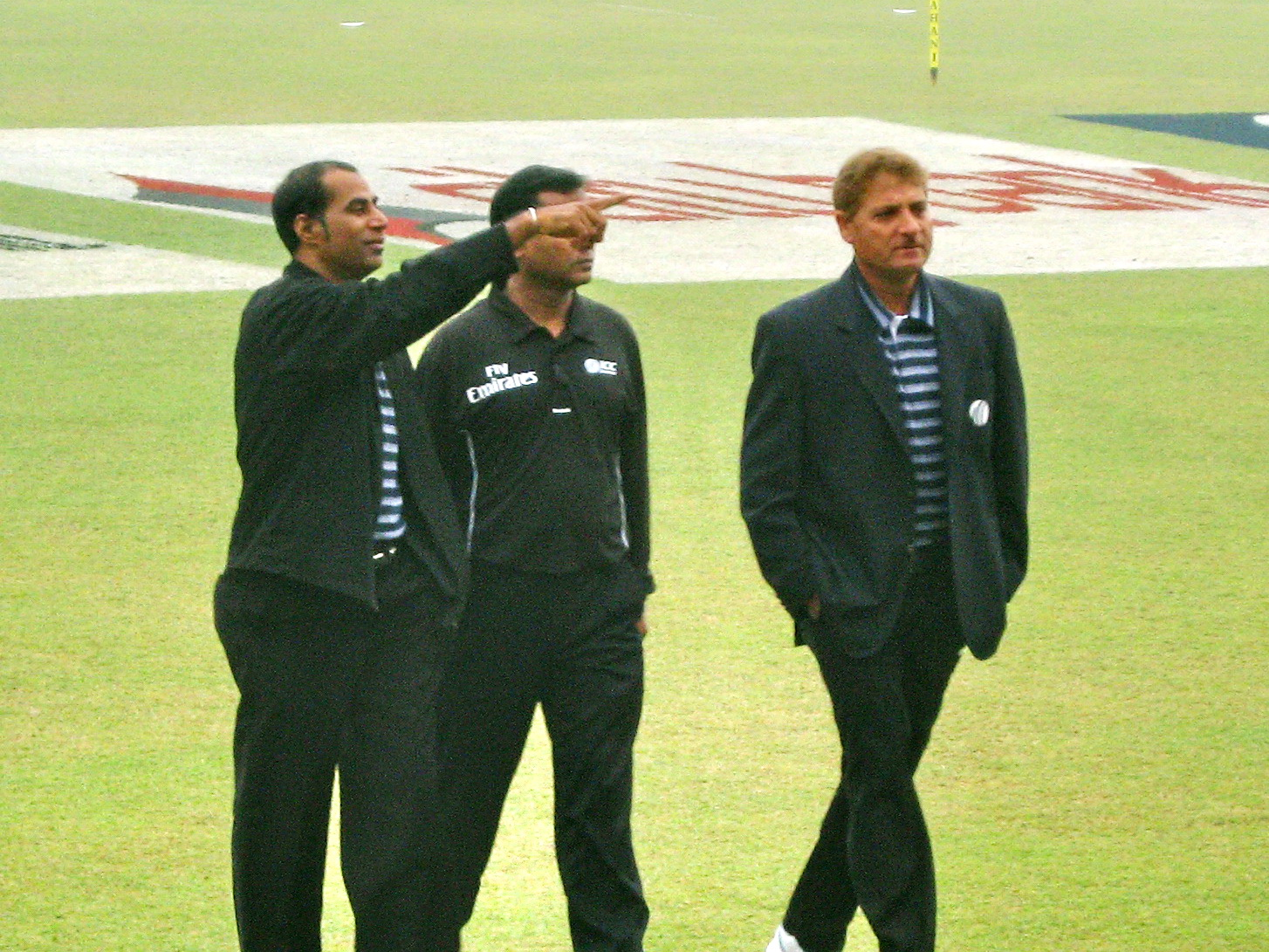
Umpire Enamul Haque (left) examining Dhaka Mirpur ground with colleagues Zameer Haider and AFM Akhtaruddin prior to 3rd ODI between Bangladesh and Zimbabwe in January 2009.

Both Moni and Bulbul were left-arm slow bowlers, and lower-order hitters which is unusual for a single side. In fact, at the time of Rafique's arrival, many thought that Moni's international career was over because of his form during the 5th ICC Trophy in Kenya early in 1994. Yet, the partnership formed a unique combination which went on to serve the national squad well throughout the '90s.

In the 2nd SAARC cricket tournament at Dhaka during Dec. 1994, they played prominent roles in taking the local side to the final. Moni took 3/25 against Sri Lanka A & Mohammad Rafique took 3/25 against India A.

The duo were in splendid form during Bangladesh's historic triumph in 1997 ICC Trophy. The pair took 31 wickets together, Rafique 19 at 10.68, Moni 12 at 18 a piece. Rafique also came good with the bat in the final. Promoted to the opening slot in a rain shortened game, he blasted 26 off only 15 deliveries; his innings including two sixes and two fours.

And finally, they played their part in the first ever ODI win for Bangladesh against Kenya in 1998. Rafique won the MOM award for his 77 with the bat and 3/56 with the ball, Moni took 2/45 from 10 economical overs.

== As an umpire ==
Since, 2006, he has been serving as an international umpire.

| | First | Latest | Total |
|---|---|---|---|
| Tests | New Zealand vs Zimbabwe at McLean Park, Napier, Jan 2012 | | 1 |
| ODIs | Bangladesh vs Zimbabwe at Bogra, 3 Dec 2006 | Bangladesh vs Zimbabwe at Mirpur, 9 Nov 2015 | 54 |
| T20Is | Bangladesh vs Zimbabwe at Khulna, 28 Nov 2006 | Bangladesh vs Sri Lanka at Mirpur, 4 Mar 2016 | 14 |

Updated 15 July 2021

== See also ==
- List of Test cricket umpires
- List of One Day International cricket umpires
- List of Twenty20 International cricket umpires
