= R. T. Ramachandran (umpire) =

Indian cricket umpire (1947–2021)

Personal information
- Born: 4 July 1947; Nagpur, India
- Died: 4 February 2021 (aged 73)

Umpiring information
- ODIs umpired: 4 (1993–1998)
- Source: Cricinfo, 27 May 2014

R. T. Ramachandran (4 July 1947 – 4 February 2021) was an Indian cricket umpire. He stood in four One Day International (ODI) matches from 1993 to 1998.

== See also ==
- List of One Day International cricket umpires
