= K. N. Raghavan =

Indian cricket umpire (born 1964)

Personal information
- Born: 30 May 1964 (age 62)

Umpiring information
- ODIs umpired: 1 (1998)
- Source: ESPNcricinfo, 26 May 2014

K. N. Raghavan (born 30 May 1964) is a former Indian cricket umpire. He only stood in one international fixture, an ODI game, in 1998. He retired from umpiring in April 2013.

== See also ==
- List of One Day International cricket umpires
