= Rajan Seth =

Indian cricket umpire (born 1952)

Personal information
- Born: 10 February 1952 (age 74)

Umpiring information
- ODIs umpired: 1 (1998)
- WTests umpired: 1 (2002)
- WODIs umpired: 1 (1997–2004)
- Source: Cricinfo, 29 May 2014

Rajan K Seth (born 10 February 1952) is a former Indian cricket umpire. He mainly umpired in domestic matches, standing in just one ODI game in 1998.

== See also ==
- List of One Day International cricket umpires
