= M. S. K. Prasad =

Indian cricketer (born 1975)

MSK Prasad
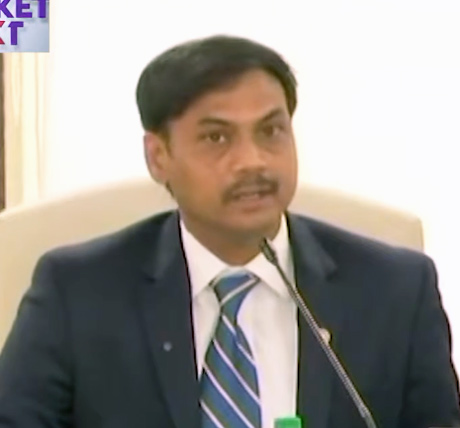
- MSK Prasad in 2019

Personal information
- Full name: Mannava Sri Kanth Prasad
- Born: 24 April 1975 (age 51); Medikonduru, Guntur, Andhra Pradesh, India
- Batting: Right-handed

Career statistics
Competition	Test	ODI
Matches	6	17
Runs scored	106	131
Batting average	11.77	14.55
100s/50s	0/0	0/1
Top score	19*	63
Catches/stumpings	15/0	14/7
- Source: ESPNcricinfo, 22 February 2022

Mannava Sri Kanth Prasad (born 24 April 1975) is a retired Indian cricketer. He was most recently the chief selector of the Indian National Cricket Team and led the selection of the Indian team for the 2019 Cricket World Cup. He played six Test matches and 17 One Day Internationals in his professional career.

== Early life and career ==
Prasad was born in Medikonduru, in the Guntur district of Andhra Pradesh, India, to a middle-class family. He started his cricket career with the Andhra Pradesh Ranji team. He made his international debut with the India-A Team during the bilateral cricket series with Pakistan-A in 1997–98. He got a lucky break in the 1999 Cricket World Cup when the regular wicketkeeper Nayan Mongia got injured. In 1999–2000, he played six test matches – three each against Australia and New Zealand. However, after this his form dipped and he averaged only 8 runs with the bat. His continued batting failures led to the end of his career. In the six Test matches he played, Prasad scored 106 runs at an average of 11.78. In the 17 ODIs, he scored 131 runs at an average below 15, with only one half-century in the process. That ended his brief international career.

== National selector ==
On 21 September 2016, MSK Prasad was appointed as Chief National Selector of the Indian men's cricket team by BCCI. His tenure as Chief Selector ended on 4 March 2020.
