= Gagan Khoda =

Indian cricketer (born 1974)

Personal information
- Full name: Gagan Kishanlal Khoda
- Born: 24 October 1974 (age 52); Rajasthan, India
- Batting: Right-handed
- Role: Batsman

International information
- National side: India
- ODI debut (cap 114): 14 May 1998 v Bangladesh
- Last ODI: 20 May 1998 v Kenya

Career statistics
Competition	ODI	FC	LA
Matches	2	132	119
Runs scored	115	8,516	4,487
Batting average	57.50	39.06	40.06
100s/50s	0/1	30/42	10/27
Top score	89	300*	166*
Balls bowled	–	1,154	363
Wickets	–	14	9
Bowling average	–	48.92	39.66
5 wickets in innings	–	0	0
10 wickets in match	–	0	0
Best bowling	–	3/24	3/30
Catches/stumpings	0/–	91/–	39/–
- Source: ESPNcricinfo, 6 August 2017

Gagan Khoda (born 24 October 1974) is an Indian former cricketer. He played two One Day Internationals in 1998. Despite scoring 89 runs in one of those two innings, he never made it to the Indian team after those two matches.

He has been given due recognition now after his appointment as a National Selector by the BCCI on 9 November 2015, representing the Central Zone in the Selection Committee. Now has two children called aaryaman Khoda and aaryaveer Khoda.

== Domestic career ==
In domestic cricket, he represented Rajasthan cricket team and Central Zone cricket team. Khoda, enjoyed an outstanding junior career before making a century on debut in the Ranji Trophy in 1991–92. A score of 237 in the Ranji quarter-final in 1994–95 further established him as a promising youngster. Now he has two son called Aaryaveer and Aaryaman .

Now actively retired from cricket, Gagan focuses his time and energy on running an outlet of a laundry and dry-cleaning chain in India, UClean.

== International career ==
He represented India in two One Day Internationals and scored 89 against Kenya and was Man of the Match. He scored 26 against Bangladesh in Coca-Cola tri-series 1997/98. He was one of the new openers that India had tried out. He also played in the 1998 Commonwealth Games in Malaysia, without much impact.
