= Saiful Islam (cricketer, born 1969) =

Bangladeshi cricketer (born 1969)

Personal information
- Born: 14 April 1969 (age 57); Mymensingh, East Pakistan
- Batting: Right-handed
- Bowling: Right-arm medium

International information
- National side: Bangladesh
- ODI debut (cap 23): 31 December 1990 v Sri Lanka
- Last ODI: 10 October 1997 v Kenya
- Source: , 13 February 2006

Mohammad Saiful Islam Khan (Bengali: মোহাম্মদ সাইফুল ইসলাম খান) (born 14 April 1969) is a former Bangladeshi cricketer who played in seven One Day Internationals from 1990 to 1997.

Originally from Mymensingh, Saif played for the Bangladesh U-19 side in 1989. He made his full ODI debut at Eden Gardens, Calcutta, on 31 December 1990. His best performance in ODI came at Sharjah against Sri Lanka in 1995. He took 4/36 to help Bangladesh bowl out their opposition for the first time in a full ODI. He also played in the Bangladesh side that won the ICC Trophy in 1997. But with the emergence of a group of talented medium pacers, he soon lost his place in the national side.
