= Athar Ali Khan =

Bangladeshi cricket commentator

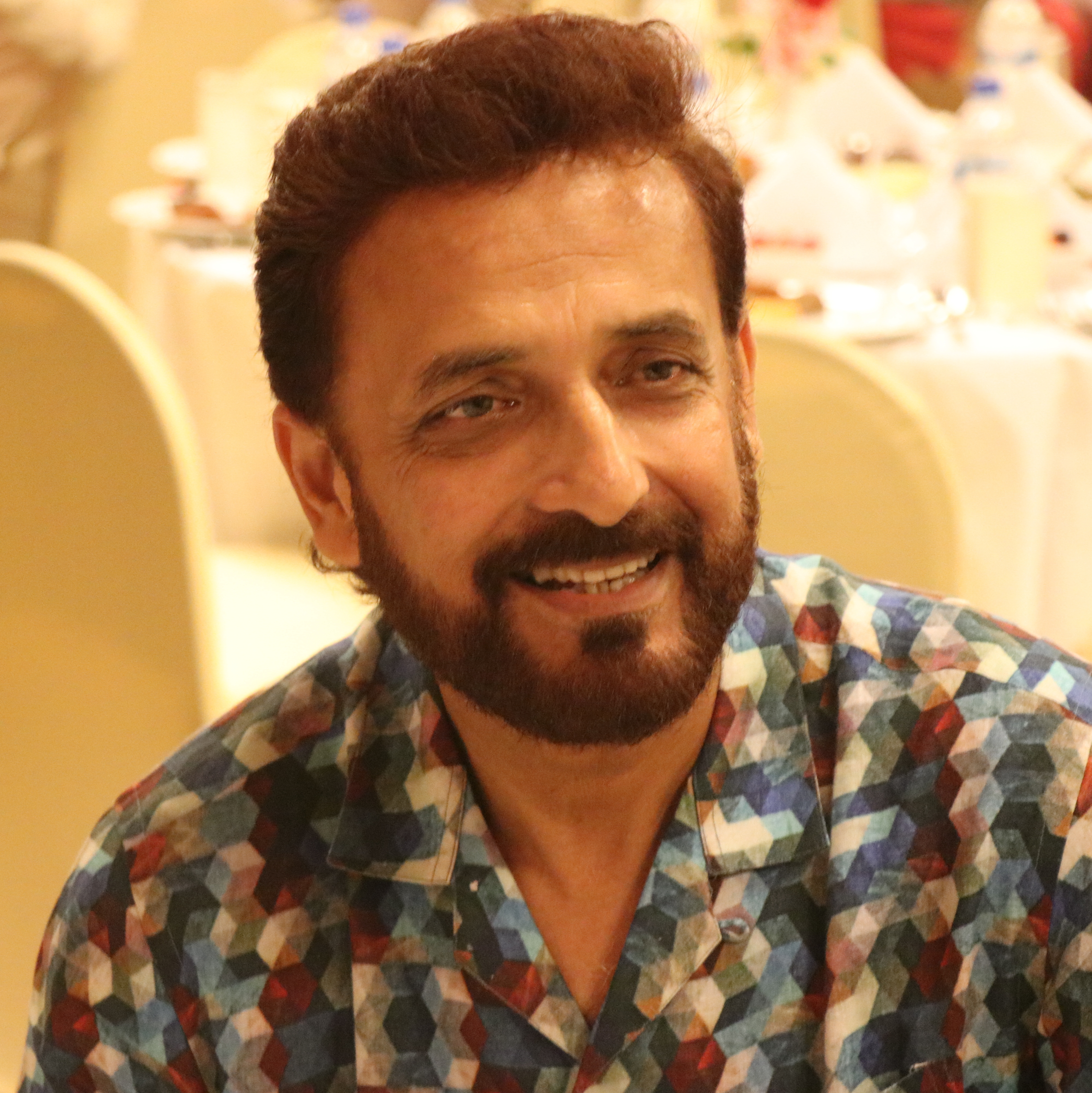
- Khan in 2018

Personal information
- Born: 10 February 1962 (age 64); Dacca, East Pakistan
- Height: 6 ft 2 in (1.88 m)
- Batting: Right-handed
- Bowling: Right-arm medium
- Role: Batter

International information
- National side: Bangladesh
- ODI debut (cap 13): 27 October 1988 v India
- Last ODI: 25 May 1998 v India

Career statistics
| Competition | ODIs | FC |
|---|---|---|
| Matches | 19 | 3 |
| Runs scored | 532 | 48 |
| Batting average | 29.55 | 8.00 |
| 100s/50s | 0/3 | 0/0 |
| Top score | 82 | 23 |
| Balls bowled | 420 | 258 |
| Wickets | 6 | 1 |
| Bowling average | 60.83 | 109.00 |
| 5 wickets in innings | – | – |
| 10 wickets in match | – | – |
| Best bowling | 2/33 | 1/38 |
| Catches/stumpings | 2/– | 5/– |
- Source: Cricinfo, 29 December 2015

Athar Ali Khan (Bengali: আতহার আলী খান; born 10 February 1962) is a Bangladeshi cricket commentator and former cricketer. Throughout the 1980s, Athar played as a middle order batsman, batting mostly at No. 4 or 5.

Later on, encouraged by the Indian Test cricketer, Mohinder Amarnath, Athar started opening regularly for the Bangladesh national cricket team. He was also an occasional slow medium pacer. His ancestors were from Uttar Pradesh in India.

== International career ==
=== Early years ===
In 1984, Athar played for the Bangladesh Tigers in the first South East Asian Cup. A year later, he played in a three-day match against Sri Lanka in Dhaka. During the 1984-85 season, he was part of the Dhaka University team which won the national cricket title. In the semi-final, against Dhaka district, Athar scored 155 and shared a record stand of 447 with Tariquzzaman Munir (who scored 308).

=== Prominence ===
In October 1988, he was Bangladesh's best performer in the Wills Asia Cup at Dhaka. He scored 16 against India, 22 against Pakistan and 30 against Sri Lanka. Then on the final day of 1990, he entertained the huge 50,000-strong crowd at Eden Garden, Calcutta with a score of 78* against Sri Lanka. His innings included three huge sixes. Although Bangladesh lost the match, Athar was adjudged the Man-of-the-Match.

Athar's highest ODI score (82) came against Pakistan in 1997. There, he put on a century partnership (110) with skipper Akram Khan (59). He was involved with another century partnership a year later. Against Kenya, he put on 137 for the first wicket with Mohammad Rafiq. Athar's own contribution was 47. This partnership set up Bangladesh's first ever ODI win. His best bowling in ODI was 2/33 against India at Mohali in 1997. Sourav Ganguly was one of his victims.

Athar played for Bangladesh in three ICC Trophy tournaments, in England in 1986, in Kenya in 1994 and finally in Malaysia in 1997. He had a disappointing time in England in '86, as he lost his place in the side midway through the trophy, due to lack of form. He had scored only 55 runs from 5 innings. The wet conditions in England did not suit Athar's batting technique. After being overlooked for the 1990 trophy in Netherlands, Athar returned for 1994 tournament in Kenya. There also, he failed to live up to the expectations, scoring only 90 runs from 6 innings. However, Athar played a big part in Bangladesh's success 3 years later. He scored 170 runs from 9 innings, with 2 not outs, as Bangladesh became the unbeaten champion.

== Beyond internationals ==
1988 was a highly successful year for Athar Ali Khan. First, at the 2nd South East Asian Cup at Hong Kong Athar scored 92 not out against Hong Kong, 69 not out against Singapore in the League matches and followed these with 64 in the final against Hong Kong. He was adjudged the Man-of-the-Match for the final.

Athar played for Bangladesh in 3 South Asian Association for Regional Cooperation cricket tournaments in Dhaka. He scored 52 against Sri Lanka A in 1994, to set up a win for his team.

== Outside cricket ==
He studied public administration at Dhaka University.

== International awards ==
=== One Day International Cricket ===
==== Man of the Match awards ====
| S No | Opponent | Venue | Date | Match performance | Result |
|---|---|---|---|---|---|
| 1 | Sri Lanka | Eden Gardens, Kolkata | 31 December 1990 | 4-0-24-0; 78* (95 balls) | Sri Lanka won by 71 runs. |
