= Aminul Islam (cricketer, born 1968) =

Bangladeshi cricket administrator

- আমিনুল ইসলাম
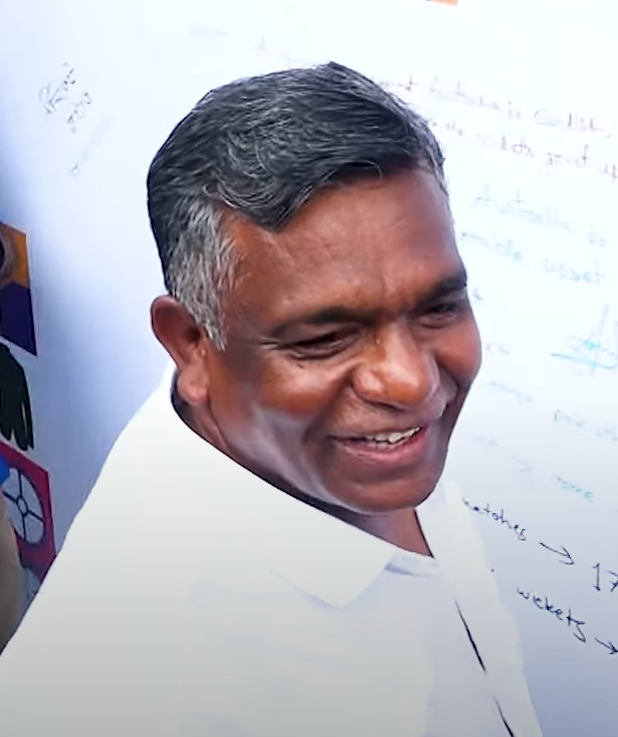
- Bulbul in 2025

President of Bangladesh Cricket Board
- In office 30 May 2025 – 7 April 2026
- Vice President: Faruque Ahmed
- Preceded by: Faruque Ahmed
- Succeeded by: Tamim Iqbal

Personal details
- Born: 2 February 1968 (age 58) Dacca, East Pakistan
- Cricket career

Personal information
- Full name: Mohammad Aminul Islam
- Nickname: Bulbul
- Batting: Right-handed
- Bowling: Right-arm off break

International information
- National side: Bangladesh (1988–2002)
- Test debut (cap 3): 10 November 2000 v India
- Last Test: 8 December 2002 v West Indies
- ODI debut (cap 12): 27 October 1988 v India
- Last ODI: 25 January 2002 v Pakistan
- ODI shirt no.: 1

Domestic team information
- Years: Team
- 2000–2001: Biman Bangladesh
- 2001–2003: Dhaka Division

Career statistics
Competition	Tests	ODIs
Matches	13	39
Runs scored	530	794
Batting average	21.19	23.35
100s/50s	1/2	0/3
Top score	145	70
Balls bowled	198	412
Wickets	1	7
Bowling average	149.00	58.71
5 wickets in innings	0	0
10 wickets in match	0	0
Best bowling	1/66	3/57
Catches/stumpings	5/–	13/–
- Source: ESPNcricinfo, 12 February 2006

Mohammad Aminul Islam (Bengali: মোহাম্মদ আমিনুল ইসলাম; born 2 February 1968), popularly known by his nickname 'Bulbul', is a former Bangladeshi cricketer and captain, who was the president of the Bangladesh Cricket Board from May 2025 to April 2026.

Aminul Islam scored the first hundred for the Bangladesh cricket team when Bangladesh played their first Test against India, thus becoming only the third cricketer after Charles Bannerman and Dave Houghton to score centuries on their own and their country's Test debut. He was one of Bangladesh's most celebrated cricketers in the pre-Test-status era.

== Early years ==
Just two years after quitting soccer due to an injury, Aminul Islam saw himself representing the International Cricket Council (ICC) Associates Young Cricketers' squad in the first-ever Youth World Cup held in Australia, where he took six wickets with his off spin, one of which was that of Brian Lara. The same year, he made his ODI debut for the national cricket team at Chittagong in the Asia Cup (1988). He scored 27 runs in the match against Sri Lanka.

A year later, he scored a century against Malaysia in the U-19 Asian Cup. In 1995, he scored a century against the visiting England A side in a three-day match at Dhaka.

== In ODIs ==
Although his ODI career started in 1988 and went on until 2001–02, he played only 39 ODI matches. This was due to the fact that before becoming a full member of the ICC in 2000, Bangladesh seldom got a chance to play official one day internationals. Over the years, Islam's role in the side changed. In the initial years, he was a lower order batsman and off spin bowler. In later years, he mainly concentrated on his batting. His highest ODI score, 70, came against India at Mohali in 1998. His best bowling figures, three wickets for 57 runs (3/57), were against Zimbabwe at Nairobi in October 1997.

Career ODI batting performances:

Opposition	Matches	Runs	Average	Highest Score	100 / 50
Australia	2	54	54.00	41*	0/0
England	1	30	30.00	30	0/0
India	8	277	46.17	70	0/2
Kenya	5	93	23.25	37	0/0
New Zealand	2	45	45.00	30*	0/0
Pakistan	8	124	15.50	42	0/0
Scotland	1	0	0.00	0	0/0
Sri Lanka	5	62	12.40	29	0/0
West Indies	3	68	22.67	66	0/1
Zimbabwe	4	41	10.25	16	0/0
Overall	39	794	23.35	70	0/3

== In ICC Trophy ==
Bulbul represented Bangladesh in three ICC Trophy tournaments, in 1990, 1994, and 1997. However, he failed to perform up to expectation in both 1990 and 1994. But, after a slow start in the 1997 event in Malaysia, he scored well in the big matches. In the semi-final against Scotland, he scored 57 runs, sharing a 3rd wicket stand of 115 runs in partnership with Khaled Mashud Pilot. In the final, he scored a quickfire 37 of 37 (with 1 six and 1 four). He shared a 53 run 4th wicket partnership stand with skipper Akram Khan.

Year	Matches	Batting				Bowling				Ref
Year	Matches	Runs	Average	Highest Score	100 / 50	Runs	Wickets	Average	Best	Ref
1990	5	88	17.60	30	0/0	69	1	69.00	1/17	
1994	7	143	23.83	74	0/1	31	1	31.00	1/13	
1997	10	217	31.00	57	0/2	–				
Overall	22	448	24.89	74	0/3	100	2	50.00	1/13	

== As a captain ==
He took over the captaincy of the national team in 1998. He was the captain of the Bangladesh cricket team in the 1999 Cricket World Cup.

Preceded by Akram Khan (cricketer)	Bangladesh ODI captains 1999–2000	Succeeded by Naimur Rahman
Preceded by -	Bangladesh WC captains 1999	Succeeded by Khaled Mashud

== As a coach and instructor ==
Aminul Islam is one of Bangladesh's most qualified coaches at the moment and was serving as ICC's cricket development officer for China, Hong Kong, UAE, Singapore, Thailand, and Myanmar. He completed his Level-1, Level-2 and Level-3 coaching degrees from Cricket Victoria and has trained club sides in Melbourne and Sydney. He finished the initial two levels of instructor courses from Cricket Australia in 2005. He began working for the Asian Cricket Council improvement program and, furthermore. finished the renowned Level-3 instructing a course in 2009. In eight years at the ACC, he led around 80 training courses in Afghanistan, Brunei, China, Malaysia, Myanmar, Singapore, and the UAE. He became the development manager for the ICC Asia region in 2016. As of 2023, he lives in Australia.

== As a cricket administrator ==
On 30 May 2025, he was appointed as the president of the Bangladesh Cricket Board.

== Football career ==
Before becoming a prominent figure in Bangladeshi cricket, Aminul played football at the domestic level. As a striker, Aminul represented Gendaria Famous Club in the Pioneer League and was league's top scorer once. In 1986, he played for East End Club in the First Division, however, he was unable to help the club avoid relegation. The following year, he joined Victoria SC and remained a First Division player; however, he suffered a major injury while playing against Mohammedan SC, which ended his football career.
