= Akram Khan (cricketer) =

Bangladeshi cricketer

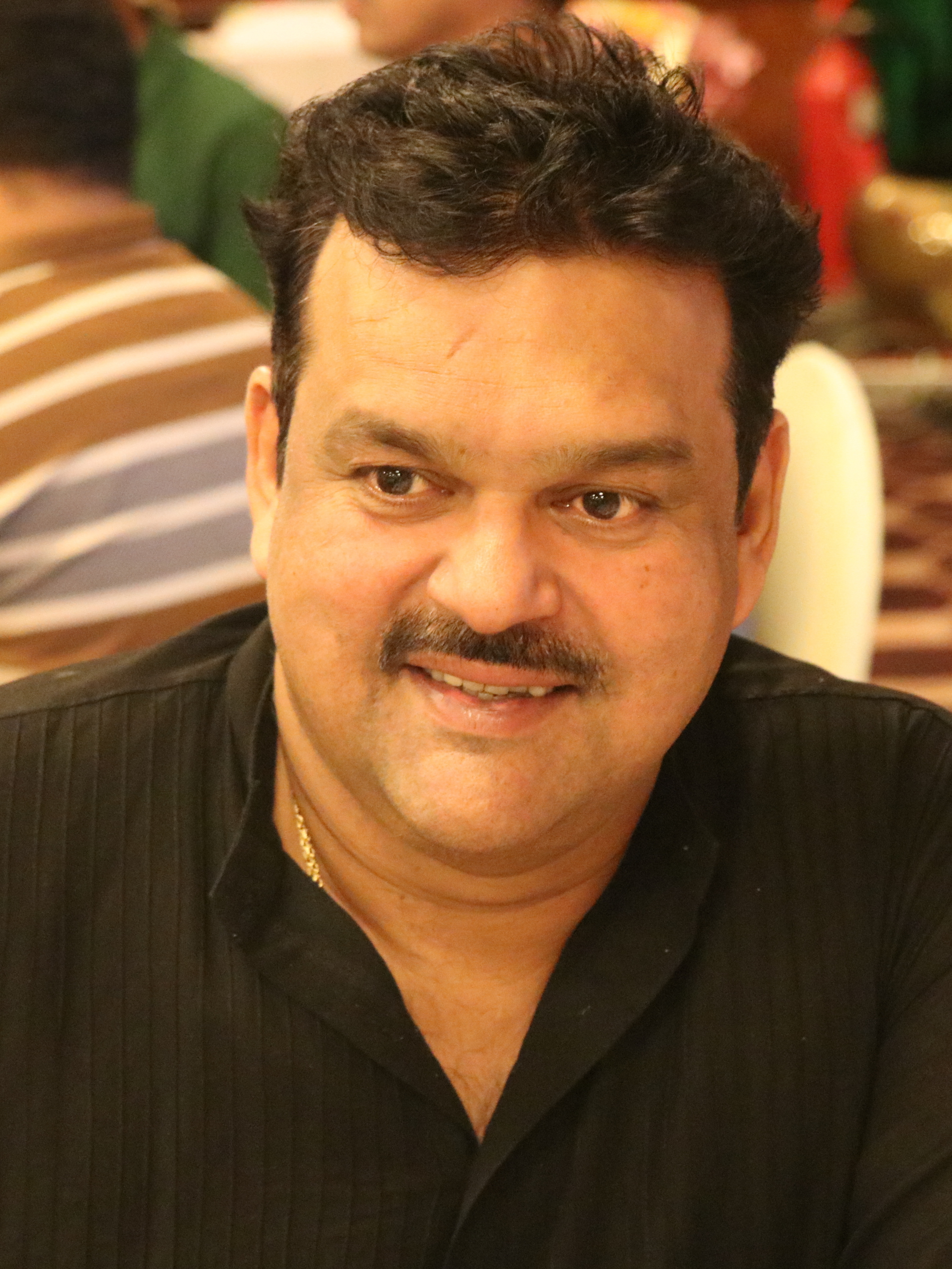
- Akram Khan in 2018

Personal information
- Full name: Mohammad Akram Hussain Khan
- Born: 1 November 1968 (age 58); Chittagong, East Pakistan
- Height: 1.82 m (6 ft 0 in)
- Batting: Right-handed
- Bowling: Right-arm medium-fast
- Role: Batsman
- Relatives: Tamim Iqbal (nephew); Nafees Iqbal (nephew)

International information
- National side: Bangladesh (1988–2003)
- Test debut (cap 1): 10 November 2000 v India
- Last Test: 1 May 2003 v South Africa
- ODI debut (cap 18): 29 October 1988 v Pakistan
- Last ODI: 17 April 2003 v South Africa
- ODI shirt no.: 6

Career statistics
Competition	Test	ODI	FC	LA
Matches	8	44	43	94
Runs scored	259	976	2,117	2,192
Batting average	16.18	23.23	29.00	27.74
100s/50s	0/0	0/5	2/10	0/12
Top score	44	65	129*	82
Balls bowled	0	117	51	202
Wickets	0	0	1	0
Bowling average	–	–	23.00	–
5 wickets in innings	–	–	0	–
10 wickets in match	–	–	0	–
Best bowling	–	–	1/7	–
Catches/stumpings	3/–	8/–	24/–	18/–
- Source: Cricinfo, 28 July 2021

Mohammad Akram Hussain Khan (Bengali: মোহাম্মদ আকরাম হুসেইন খান; born 1 November 1968) is a former Bangladeshi cricketer. A hard hitting middle-order batsman, Akram played first-class cricket for Chittagong Division. As captain, he led Bangladesh to victory in the 1997 ICC Trophy. He was the chief selector of the BCB, along with Habibul Bashar and Minhajul Abedin.

Akram Khan was part of Bangladesh's inaugural Test match, in 2000–01 against India. He had been playing One Day International cricket since 1988. He developed as an international player under the able guidance of Gazi Ashraf Lipu. He retired from international cricket in 2003.

== Early life ==
Akram Khan was born in the port city of Chittagong. His paternal Khan family is a prestigious family in the city, who originally migrated from Bihar. His brother, Iqbal Khan, was a reputed footballer, making Akram the uncle of Bangladeshi cricketers Nafees and Tamim Iqbal.

== International career ==
He was already well into his 30s when he played in Bangladesh's inaugural match. He finished his short Test career with a moderate average of 16.18 runs. His highest, 44 runs, came against Zimbabwe cricket team at Harare in 2001.

He made his One Day International debut in October 1988, in his hometown Chittagong. Batting at No. 8, he defied the strong Pak bowling attack scoring 21* runs of 35 deliveries. He captained Bangladesh in the Asia Cup at Sharjah in 1995. He was the team's most consistent performer scoring 24, 24 & 44 against India, Sri-Lanka and Pakistan respectively. His first ODI 50 came against Pakistan at Colombo in 1997. There he shared a 110 run partnership with Athar Ali Khan. His highest ODI score of 65 runs, came at Dhaka against Kenya in 1999. He followed this with 50* runs against Zimbabwe. He played in two World Cups, in 1999 & 2003. He played a large part in Bangladesh's upset win in the 1999 World Cup over Pakistan with an innings of 42 runs.

His most memorable moment came in the 1997 ICC Trophy, as he lifted the cup for his side. He contributed a quickfire 22 runs off 27 balls, including a six and a four, in the final. Earlier, he had played a captain's knock in the do-or-die game against the Netherlands. His 68* runs not-out, helped Bangladesh win by 3 wickets. Bangladesh were struggling at 15/4, chasing a small total, after the Dutch fast bowler Roland Lefebvre demolished the top order. Then Akram Khan changed the course of the match with two half-century partnerships with the veteran Minhajul Abedin and the medium-pacer Saiful Islam. Overall, he finished the tournament with 185 runs at an average of 37.00. His effort against the Dutch is not his only match winning innings in International Cricket Council Trophy history. In 1994, batting at No. 7, he scored 64* runs against USA, taking his team from 36/5 to 147/7, winning the match by 3 wickets. And in 1990, he took Bangladesh to a vital 3 wicket win against Fiji with a knock of 42*. Overall, in 24 matches in 3 ICC Trophy tournaments, he scored 476 runs at an average of 36.61. Also, bowling his gentle medium pacers, he took 10 wickets with an impressive average of 18.7.

== International captaincy ==
He took the captaincy of the national side at a difficult time during the 1994–95 season. Following the disappointment of the 1994 ICC Trophy in Kenya, there was dissatisfaction and disunity among the players. Akram, who was an established member of the side was selected to lead the side. This seemed slightly risky, as the Chittagong batsman had little previous experience as captain. But, he performed admirably, leading his side to some memorable successes.

In December, 1994, he led his side to the final of 1994–95 SAARC Quadrangular cricket tournament in Dhaka. He batted bravely in the final, top-scoring with 66 (before falling to leg spin of Sairaj Bahutule). However, his side lost by 52 runs to India 'A', led by Praveen Amre. In 1996, he led Bangladesh to victory in the South East Asian Cricket. It was followed by a bigger triumph in ICC Trophy (1997) in KL. He also led Bangladesh to their first ever ODI win. After Mohammad Rafique & Athar Ali Khan posted a century opening stand, Akram's quickfire 39 runs (from just 51 deliveries) took Bangladesh to 237/4, winning by 6 wickets against Kenya. He is the first ODI winning captain in Bangladesh.

== Relatives ==
His family has produced a number of other cricketers. In recent times, his nephews Nafees Iqbal and Tamim Iqbal have worn national colors. Both of them are opening batsman. While right-handed Nafees Iqbal has lost his form after some initial successes, his younger brother, left-handed Tamim, became the most successful run-scorer for Bangladesh.
