= List of Kenyan first-class cricketers =

This is a list of Kenyan first-class cricketers. First-class cricket matches are those between international teams or the highest standard of domestic teams in which teams have two innings each. Generally, matches are eleven players a side but there have been exceptions. Today all matches must be scheduled to have at least three days' duration; historically, matches were played to a finish with no pre-defined timespan. This list is not limited to those who have played first-class cricket for Kenya and may include Kenyan players who played their first-class cricket elsewhere. The list is in alphabetical order.

Name	Career span	Matches	Teams
Josephat Ababu	2001–2004	4	Kenya
Mohsin Ali	2000	1	Kenya
Zulfiqar Ali	1974–1975	2	East Africa
Joseph Angara	1998–2005	7	Kenya
Jadhavji Bhimji	2001–2004	3	Kenya
Amit Bhudia	2004	2	Kenya
Rajesh Bhudia	2004–2007	6	Kenya, Kenya Select
Jamie Dalrymple	2001–2007	66	British Universities, England A, Middlesex, Oxford UCCE, Oxford University
Zafir Din	1998	1	Kenya
Sandip Gupta	2001	1	Kenya
Basher Hassan	1963–1985	332	Coast Cricket Association XI, East African Invitation XI, Nottinghamshire, TN Pearce's XI
Abeed Janmohamed	2000–2004	5	Kenya, Oxford Universities
Jimmy Kamande	2001–2010	8	Kenya, Kenya Select
Muslim Kanji	1986	1	Kenya
Ashish Karia	2006	1	Kenya
Sagar Karia	2007	1	Kenya Select
Aasif Karim	1986–1998	2	Kenya
Sibtain Kassamali	1986	1	Kenya
Anil Lakhani	1967	1	East Africa
Alfred Luseno	2001–2007	9	Kenya
Daniel Macdonald	1986	1	Kenya
Hitesh Mehta	1986	1	Kenya
Tanmay Mishra	2004–2007	10	Kenya, Kenya Select
Hitesh Modi	2001–2006	25	Kenya
Alfred Njuguna	1986	1	Kenya
Alex Obanda	2007–2009	5	Kenya Select
Collins Obuya	2001–2007	36	Kenya, Kenya Select, University of West Indies Vice-Chancellor's XI, Warwickshire
David Obuya	2001–2009	11	Kenya, Kenya Select
Nehemiah Odhiambo	2006–2010	7	Kenya, Kenya Select
Thomas Odoyo	1997–2009	23	Kenya, South Africa Academy
Maurice Odumbe	1998–2004	17	Kenya
David Okumu	2004	1	Kenya
Peter Ongondo	2000–2009	26	Kenya
Lameck Onyango	1998–2005	20	Kenya
Elijah Otieno	2007–2010	3	Kenya Select
Francis Otieno	2001–2004	5	Kenya
Kennedy Otieno	1998–2006	31	Kenya, University of West Indies Vice-Chancellor's XI
Morris Ouma	2004–2010	20	Kenya, Kenya Select
Brijal Patel	1998–2006	17	Kenya
Dipak Patel	1976–1997	358	Auckland, DH Robin's XI, New Zealand, New Zealand Cricket Council President's XI, Worcestershire
Harshad Patel	1985	1	Worcestershire
Kalpesh Patel	2004–2005	4	Kenya
Malhar Patel	2004	6	Kenya
Narendra Patel	1963	1	East African Invitation XI
Raghuvir Patel	1974	1	East Africa
Rakep Patel	2007–2010	1	Kenya Select
Ramanbhai Patel	1962–1964	3	Coast Cricket Association XI, East African Invitation XI, International XI
Vinoo Patel	1964	1	Coast Cricket Association XI
Derek Pringle	1978–1993	295	Cambridge University, Combined Cambridge/Oxford University, England, England A, England B, Essex, MCC, TN Pearce's XI
Mehmood Quaraishy	1964–1974	2	Coast Cricket Association XI, East Africa
Ranchod	1964	1	Coast Cricket Association XI
Ramesh Sethi	1975	3	East Africa
Bharat Shah	1986	1	Kenya
Harilal Shah	1975	3	East Africa
Jagoo Shah	1974	1	East Africa
Jawahir Shah	1967–1975	3	East Africa
Ravindu Shah	1998–2004	21	Kenya
Mohammad Sheikh	2000–2005	7	Kenya
Zahoor Sheikh	1986	1	Kenya
Rajinder Sood	1964	1	Coast Cricket Association XI
Martin Suji	2001–2005	23	Kenya
Tony Suji	1998–2007	22	Kenya, Kenya Select
Narendra Thakker	1974	1	East Africa
Steve Tikolo	1995–2010	38	Border, Kenya, University of West Indies Vice-Chancellor's XI, Nairobi Province Cricket Association (NPCA) XI
Tom Tikolo	1986	1	Kenya
Cleophas Udoyi	1986	1	Kenya
Alpesh Vadher	1998–2000	2	Kenya
Hiren Varaiya	2006–2010	7	Kenya, Kenya Select
Naguib Verjee	1986	1	Kenya

== See also ==
- Kenya national cricket team
- List of Kenyan ODI cricketers
