= Kenya at the Men's T20 World Cup =

Kenya national team performance at T20 World Cup

The Kenya national cricket team is one of the associate members of the International Cricket Council (ICC), they are nicknamed as the Simbas. Kenya qualified for the inaugural edition of the T20 World Cup in 2007, after winning the 2007 World Cricket League Division One. In the only edition they participated in, they lost both the matches they played. The team has failed to make it to the tournament ever since.

== T20 World Cup record ==
ICC T20 World Cup record										Qualification record (Note: WCL Division One served as the qualifier for the 2007 edition.)				
Year	Round	Position	Pld	W	L	T	NR	Ab (Note: Abandoned matches are not counted in the official records.)	Captain	Pld	W	L	T	NR
(South Africa) 2007	Group stage	12/12	2	0	2	0	0	0	Steve Tikolo	5	4	1	0	0
(England) 2009	Did not qualify									4	1	3	0	0
(Cricket West Indies) 2010	Did not qualify									3	1	2	0	0
(Sri Lanka) 2012	Did not qualify									18	8	10	0	0
(Bangladesh) 2014	Did not qualify									16	11	5	0	0
(India) 2016	Did not qualify									11	7	3	0	1
(United Arab Emirates) (Oman) 2021	Did not qualify									17	10	5	0	2
(Australia) 2022	Did not qualify									6	4	2	0	0
(United States) (Cricket West Indies) 2024	Did not qualify									13	8	3	0	2
(India) (Sri Lanka) 2026	Did not qualify									10	6	4	0	0
Total	0 Titles	1/10	2	0	2	0	0	0	—N/a	103	60	38	0	5

=== Record by opponents ===
Opponent	M	W	L	T+W	T+L	NR	Ab	Win %	First played
New Zealand	1	0	1	0	0	0	0	0.00	2007
Sri Lanka	1	0	1	0	0	0	0	0.00	2007
Total	2	0	2	0	0	0	0	0.00	-
Source: Last Updated: 14 September 2007

== Tournament results ==
=== South Africa 2007 ===
Squad and kit

- Steve Tikolo (c)
- Tanmay Mishra
- Alex Obanda
- David Obuya
- Morris Ouma (wk)
- Collins Obuya
- Thomas Odoyo
- Tony Suji
- Rajesh Bhudia
- Jimmy Kamande
- Nehemiah Odhiambo
- Peter Ongondo
- Lameck Onyango
- Elijah Otieno
- Hiren Varaiya

2007 kit

Results

Group stage (Group C)			Super 8		Semifinal	Final	Overall Result
Opposition Result	Opposition Result	Rank	Opposition Result	Rank	Opposition Result	Opposition Result	Overall Result
New Zealand; L by 9 wickets	Sri Lanka; L by 172 runs	3	Did not advance				Group stage
Source: Cricinfo

Scorecards

Group stage (Group C)

12 September
10:00
(scorecard)

Kenya; 73 (16.5 overs)	v	New Zealand; 74/1 (7.4 overs)
Collins Obuya 18 (25); Mark Gillespie 4/7 (2.5 overs)		Lou Vincent 27 (20); Thomas Odoyo 1/22 (3 overs)

New Zealand won by 9 wickets
Kingsmead, Durban
Umpires: Billy Doctrove (WI) and Simon Taufel (Aus)
Player of the match: Mark Gillespie (NZ)

- New Zealand won the toss and elected to field.
- Nehemiah Odhiambo, Maurice Ouma (Ken) all made their T20I debuts.
- Kenya's score of 73 all out was the lowest ever score in a Twenty20 International.

14 September
10:00
(scorecard)

Sri Lanka; 260/6 (20 overs)	v	Kenya; 88 (19.3 overs)
Sanath Jayasuriya 88 (44); Jimmy Kamande 3/48 (4 overs)		Alex Obanda 21 (25); Tillakaratne Dilshan 2/4 (1.3 overs)

Sri Lanka won by 172 runs
Wanderers Stadium, Johannesburg
Umpires: Daryl Harper (Aus) and Nigel Llong (Eng)
Player of the match: Sanath Jayasuriya (SL)

- Kenya won the toss and elected to field.
- Kenya were eliminated as a result of this match.

== Records and statistics ==
=== Team records ===
Highest innings totals

Score	Opponent	Venue	Season
88 (19.3 overs)	Sri Lanka	Johannesburg	2007
73 (16.5 overs)	New Zealand	Durban	2007
Last updated: 14 September 2007

=== Batting statistics ===
Most runs

Runs	Player	Mat	Inn	HS	Avg	100s	50s	Period
25	Alex Obanda	2	2	21	12.50	—N/a	—N/a	2007–2007
20	Collins Obuya	2	2	18	10.00	—N/a	—N/a	2007–2007
18	Thomas Odoyo	2	1	18	18.00	—N/a	—N/a	2007–2007
18	Jimmy Kamande	2	2	14	9.00	—N/a	—N/a	2007–2007
18	David Obuya	2	2	18	9.00	—N/a	—N/a	2007–2007
Last updated: 14 September 2007

=== Bowling statistics ===
Most wickets

Wickets	Player	Matches	Avg.	Econ.	BBI	4W	5W	Period
3	Jimmy Kamande	2	16.00	12.00	3/48	0	0	2007–2007
2	Thomas Odoyo	2	18.66	6.00	1/14	0	0	2007–2007
1	Nehemiah Odhiambo	2	65.00	13.00	1/57	0	0	2007–2007
Last updated: 14 September 2007
