= Marylebone Cricket Club in East Africa in 1981–82 =

A cricket team representing the Marylebone Cricket Club toured East Africa in late 1981 playing games against Kenya, Malawi, Tanzania and Zambia as well as against the full East African team.

== Tour matches ==
Many games only have potted scorecards available

4-5 October 1981
Scorecard

Tanzania	v	Marylebone Cricket Club
221; Gulam Raza 83; Asif Din 5/41		145/7d Robert Lanchbury 34; Sajad Lakha 3/37
77 Asif Din 3/7		156/4; Mark Nicholas 67

Marylebone Cricket Club won by 6 wickets
Dar-es-Salaam

- Toss not known

6 October 1981
Scorecard

Marylebone Cricket Club; 234/6 (60 overs)	v	Tanzania; 101
Stephen Coverdale 63		Mohammed Nathoo 33

Marylebone Cricket Club won by 133 runs
Dar-es-Salaam

- Toss not known

8 October 1981
Scorecard

Marylebone Cricket Club; 145/7 (50 overs)	v	Copperbelt Cricket Association President's XI; 146/8
		Narendra Thakker 30

Copperbelt Cricket Association President's XI won by 2 wickets
Ndola Cricket Ground, Ndola

- Toss not known

9 October 1981
Scorecard

Marylebone Cricket Club; 302/5 (60 overs)	v	Zambia; 120
Mark Nicholas 126		Bimal Soni 51; Simon Dennis 3/14

Marylebone Cricket Club won by 182 runs
Roan Antelope Ground, Luanshya

- Toss not known

10-11 October 1981
Scorecard

Zambia	v	Marylebone Cricket Club
153; Bimal Soni 53; Dermott Monteith 5/53		232/8d John Hampshire 99; Bill Bourne 6/51
100 Dermott Monteith 6/37		23/0

Marylebone Cricket Club won by 10 wickets
Harrison Oval, Ek Park, Kitwe

- Toss not known

13 October 1981
Scorecard

Marylebone Cricket Club; 219/4 (40 overs)	v	Malawi; 152/9 (40 overs)
John Hampshire 80*		A Vanselm 40; Simon Dyson 3/12

Marylebone Cricket Club won by 67 runs
Blantyre Sports Club, Blantyre

- Toss not known

14 October 1981
Scorecard

Malawi; 159	v	Marylebone Cricket Club; 160/6
Iqbal Lorgat 45; Hugh Wilson 4/10		Stephen Coverdale 37

Marylebone Cricket Club won by 4 wickets
Blantyre Sports Club, Blantyre

- Toss not known

16 October 1981
Scorecard

Marylebone Cricket Club; 274/3 (60 overs)	v	East Africa; 187
John Hampshire 104*		Narendra Thakker 56; Asif Din 3/22

Marylebone Cricket Club won by 87 runs
Lusaka Club Ground, Lusaka

- Toss not known

17-18 October 1981
Scorecard

East Africa	v	Marylebone Cricket Club
195; Raghuvir Patel 42; Simon Dennis 5/45		174; John Hampshire 63; Bill Bourne 5/75
165; Balraj Bouri 69; Hugh Wilson 5/30		182/3; Mike Hooper 64

Marylebone Cricket Club won by 7 wickets
Municipal Sports Grounds, Lusaka

- Toss not known

21 October 1981
Scorecard

Marylebone Cricket Club; 217/6 (50 overs)	v	East Africa; 86
John Hampshire 55*		Simon Dyson 3/8

Marylebone Cricket Club won by 131 runs
Metropolitan Sports Club Ground, Lusaka

- Toss not known

23 October 1981
Scorecard

Marylebone Cricket Club; 103	v	Kenya; 105/3
John Hampshire 41; Sunil Patel 6/22		Charanjive Sharma 52*

Kenya won by 7 wickets
Nairobi Club Ground, Nairobi

- Toss not known

24-26 October 1981
Scorecard

Marylebone Cricket Club	v	Kenya
122; Asif Din 38; Ramesh Patel 4/34		260; B Musa 63; Bill Merry 7/50
155 S Harish 3/29		18/0

Kenya won by 10 wickets
Gymkhana Club Ground, Nairobi

- Toss not known
