= Canadian cricket team in Kenya in 2007–08 =

	Canada	Kenya
- Dates: 12 October – 20 October 2007
Captains	Sunil Dhaniram	Steve Tikolo

One Day International series
- Results: Kenya won the 2-match series 2–0
Most runs	Kandappah 97; Bastiampillai 69	Obanda 115; T. Odoyo 112
Most wickets	Bhatti 4 Patraj 2	Tikolo 5 Odhiambo 5

Canada toured Kenya from 18 to 20 October. Kenya won both of their ODI matches and the Intercontinental Cup match.

== Intercontinental Cup match ==
12–14 October
(scorecard)

Canada	v	Kenya
263 (88.3 ov.); Sunil Dhaniram 78 (123); Jimmy Kamande 4/56 (24 overs)		393 (107.5 overs); Thomas Odoyo 103* (161); Qaiser Ali 4/61 (25 overs)
229 (73 overs); Arvind Kandappah 87 (111); Steve Tikolo 4/34 (16 overs)		105/1 (20.2 overs); Morris Ouma 71* (68); Qaiser Ali 1/13 (2.2 overs)

Kenya won by 9 wickets
Gymkhana Club Ground, Nairobi, Kenya
Umpires: Marais Erasmus (SA) and Buddhi Pradhan (Nep)

== ODI series ==
=== 1st ODI ===
18 October
(scorecard)

Canada; 230 (48.3 overs)	v	Kenya; 233/6 (48.4 overs)
Arvind Kandappah 69* (97); Lameck Onyango 3/29 (8 overs)		Thomas Odoyo 111* (113); Umar Bhatti 3/19 (10 overs)

Kenya won by 4 wickets
Gymkhana Club Ground, Nairobi, Kenya
Umpires: Marais Erasmus (SA) and Buddhi Pradhan (Nep)

=== 2nd ODI ===
20 October
(scorecard)

Canada; 189 (47.1 overs)	v	Kenya; 193/6 (43.1 overs)
Trevin Bastiampillai 49 (73); Steve Tikolo 4/41 (10 overs)		Alex Obanda 85 (103); Jason Patraj 1/27 (5 overs)

Kenya won by 4 wickets
Gymkhana Club Ground, Nairobi, Kenya
Umpires: Marais Erasmus (SA) and Buddhi Pradhan (Nep)
