= Kenyan cricket team in South Africa in 2008–09 =

	Kenya	South Africa
- Dates: 31 October – 2 November 2008
Captains	Steve Tikolo	Johan Botha

One Day International series
- Results: South Africa won the 2-match series 2–0
Most runs	Seren Waters (89)	Jacques Kallis (163)
Most wickets	Nehemiah Odhiambo (4)	Johan Botha (4); Albie Morkel (4)
- Player of the series: Jacques Kallis (SA)

The Kenya national cricket team toured South Africa from 31 October to 2 November 2008. They played two One Day Internationals against South Africa.

== ODI series ==
=== 1st ODI ===
31 October
14:30 (D/N)
Scorecard

South Africa; 336/7 (50 overs)	v	Kenya; 177 (49.1 overs)
Jean-Paul Duminy 90 (88); Nehemiah Odhiambo 3/59 (10 overs)		Alex Obanda 38 (49); Johan Botha 4/19 (10 overs)

South Africa won by 159 runs
OUTsurance Oval, Bloemfontein
Umpires: Nigel Llong (Eng) and Marais Erasmus (SA)
Player of the match: Jean-Paul Duminy (SA)

- South Africa won the toss and elected to bat.

=== 2nd ODI ===
2 November
10:00
Scorecard

Kenya; 222/9 (50 overs)	v	South Africa; 224/3 (35.3 overs)
Seren Waters 74 (115); Albie Morkel 3/47 (10 overs)		Jacques Kallis 92* (94); Hiren Varaiya 1/44 (6 overs)

South Africa won by 7 wickets
De Beers Diamond Oval, Kimberley
Umpires: Brian Jerling (SA) and Nigel Llong (Eng)
Player of the match: Hashim Amla (SA)

- Kenya won the toss and elected to bat.
- Johann Louw (SA) made his ODI debut.
