= Cherry Blossom Sharjah Cup 2003 =

Cherry Blossom Sharjah Cup
- Cricket format: One Day International
- Tournament format(s): Round robin and Final
- Host: United Arab Emirates
- Champions: Pakistan
- Participants: Pakistan; Kenya; Sri Lanka; Zimbabwe
- Matches: 3–10 April 2003
- Player of the series: (Sri Lanka) Kumar Sangakkara
- Most runs: Kumar Sangakkara (228)
- Most wickets: Mohammad Sami (9)

The Cherry Blossom Sharjah Cup was a One Day International cricket tournament held in Sharjah during April 2003. The games took place at Sharjah Cricket Association Stadium. Seven matches were played during the tournament. Final of the tournament was played between Pakistan and Zimbabwe which Pakistan won by eight wickets. After scoring two centuries, Kumar Sangakkara was named the man of the series. It was Sanath Jayasuriya's last tournament as Sri Lankan captain.

== Squads ==
Pakistan	Kenya	Sri Lanka	Zimbabwe
Rashid Latif (c) (wk)	Steve Tikolo (c)	Sanath Jayasuriya (c)	Heath Streak (c)
Mohammad Yousuf	Joseph Angara	Marvan Atapattu	Andy Blignaut
Abdul Razzaq	Jimmy Kamande	Charitha Buddhika	Dion Ebrahim
Danish Kaneria	Alfred Luseno	Kumar Dharmasena	Sean Ervine
Faisal Iqbal	Hitesh Modi	Dilhara Fernando	Andrew Flower(wk)
Misbah-ul-Haq	Collins Obuya	Avishka Gunawardene	Grant Flower
Mohammad Hafeez	David Obuya	Prasanna Jayawardene(wk)	Travis Friend
Mohammad Sami	Thomas Odoyo	Kaushal Lokuarachchi	Douglas Hondo
Mohammad Zahid	Maurice Odumbe	Jehan Mubarak	Dougie Marillier
Naved Latif	Peter Ongondo	Muttiah Muralitharan	Stuart Matsikenyeri
Naved-ul-Hasan	Kennedy Otieno(wk)	Prabath Nissanka	Mluleki Nkala
Shoaib Malik	Morris Ouma	Kumar Sangakkara (wk)	Raymond Price
Taufeeq Umar	Brijal Patel	Hashan Tillakaratne	Gavin Rennie
Umar Gul	Martin Suji	Chaminda Vaas	Tatenda Taibu (wk)
Younis Khan	Tony Suji	Michael Vandort	Craig Wishart

== Points table ==
Points Table
Pos	Team	Pld	W	L	T	NR	Pts	NRR	For	Against
1	Pakistan	3	3	0	0	0	17	+1.515	789/147.2	576/150.0
2	Zimbabwe	3	2	1	0	0	10	-0.347	634/147.4	696/150.0
3	Sri Lanka	3	1	2	0	0	8	+0.740	672/150.0	546/146.0
4	Kenya	3	0	3	0	0	1	-1.881	495/150.0	772/149.0

== Round robin matches ==
=== Match 1 ===
3 April 2003
14:00 (D/N)
Scorecard

Pakistan; 278/7 (50 overs)	v	Zimbabwe; 210 (44.1 overs)
Abdul Razzaq 76* (53); Heath Streak 2/31 (10 overs)		Dougie Marillier 59 (73); Umar Gul 2/25 (7 overs)

Pakistan won by 68 runs.
Sharjah Cricket Association Stadium, UAE
Umpires: Billy Doctrove (WIN) and Arani Jayaprakash (Ind)
Player of the match: Abdul Razzaq (Pak)

- Pakistan won the toss and elected to bat.
- Umar Gul (Pak) made his ODI debut.

=== Match 2 ===
4 April 2003
14:00 (D/N)
Scorecard

Sri Lanka; 223/3 (50 overs)	v	Pakistan; 225/3 (47.2 overs)
Kumar Sangakkara 100* (111); Naved-ul-Hasan 2/55 (10 overs)		Mohammad Yousuf 64* (64); Dilhara Fernando 1/34 (8 overs)

Pakistan won by 7 wickets (with 16 balls remaining)
Sharjah Cricket Association Stadium, UAE
Umpires: Kevan Barbour (Zim) and Billy Doctrove (WIN)
Player of the match: Kumar Sangakkara (SL)

- Sri Lanka won the toss and elected to bat.
- Kumar Sangakkara (SL) scored his first century in ODIs.

=== Match 3 ===
5 April 2003
14:00 (D/N)
Scorecard

Kenya; 225/6 (50 overs)	v	Zimbabwe; 230/5 (49 overs)
David Obuya 57 (89); Douglas Hondo 2/37 (8 overs)		Dougie Marillier 100 (140); Tony Suji 2/30 (3 overs)

Zimbabwe won by 5 wickets (with 6 balls remaining)
Sharjah Cricket Association Stadium, UAE
Umpires: Billy Doctrove (WIN) and Arani Jayaprakash (Ind)
Player of the match: Dougie Marillier (Zim)

- Kenya won the toss and elected to bat.

=== Match 4 ===
6 April 2003
14:00 (D/N)
Scorecard

Sri Lanka; 256/5 (50 overs)	v	Kenya; 127 (37.5 overs)
Kumar Sangakkara 103* (108); Collins Obuya 2/38 (10 overs)		Maurice Odumbe 42 (68); Muttiah Muralitharan 3/16 (6.5 overs)

Sri Lanka won by 129 runs
Sharjah Cricket Association Stadium, UAE
Umpires: Kevan Barbour (Zim) and Arani Jayaprakash (Ind)
Player of the match: Kumar Sangakkara (Sri)

- Sri Lanka won the toss and elected to bat.

=== Match 5 ===
7 April 2003
14:00 (D/N)
Scorecard

Sri Lanka; 193 (49.1 overs)	v	Zimbabwe; 194/6 (48.4 overs)
Hashan Tillakaratne 31 (52); Heath Streak 3/36 (7.1 overs)		Grant Flower 61* (88); Kaushal Lokuarachchi 3/37 (10 overs)

Zimbabwe won by 4 wickets (with 8 balls remaining)
Sharjah Cricket Association Stadium, UAE
Umpires: Billy Doctrove (WIN) and Arani Jayaprakash (Ind)
Player of the match: Grant Flower (Zim)

- Sri Lanka won the toss and elected to bat.

=== Match 6 ===
8 April 2003
14:00 (D/N)
Scorecard

Pakistan; 286/8 (50 overs)	v	Kenya; 143 (31.4 overs)
Shoaib Malik 76 (58); Steve Tikolo 3/42 (8 overs)		Maurice Odumbe 54 (65); Mohammad Sami 4/25 (6.4 overs)

Pakistan won by 143 runs
Sharjah Cricket Association Stadium, UAE
Umpires: Kevan Barbour (Zim) and Arani Jayaprakash (Ind)
Player of the match: Shoaib Malik (Pak)

- Pakistan won the toss and elected to bat.

== Final ==
10 April 2003
14:00 (D/N)
Scorecard

Zimbabwe; 168 (49.1 overs)	v	Pakistan; 172/2 (35.2 overs)
Tatenda Taibu 74* (113); Shoaib Malik 3/29 (9.1 overs)		Taufeeq Umar 81* (124); Heath Streak 2/35 (8 overs)

Pakistan won by 8 wickets (with 88 balls remaining)
Sharjah Cricket Association Stadium, UAE
Umpires: Billy Doctrove (WIN) and Arani Jayaprakash (Ind)
Player of the match: Taufeeq Umar (Pak)

- Zimbabwe won the toss and elected to bat.
