= Cleophas (given name) =

Cleophas or Cléophas is a masculine given name, and a variant spelling of Cleopas, a figure of early Christianity. Notable people with the name include:

- Cleophas Lagat, Kenyan politician
- Cleophas Lunga, Anglican Bishop of Matabeleland, Zimbabwe
- Cleophas Malala, Kenyan politician and lecturer
- Cleophas Paynter (1943–1983), Vincentian cricket umpire
- Cleophas Oseso Tuka (born 1967), Kenyan Catholic prelate
- Cleophas Udoyi, Kenyan cricketer
- Cléophas Bastien (1892–1943), Canadian politician
- Cléophas Beausoleil (1845–1904), Canadian journalist, publisher, lawyer and politician
- Cléophas Kamitatu (1931–2008), Congolese politician
- Cléophas Léger (1913–1991), Canadian politician
- Alpheus Cleophas Morton (1840–1923), British architect, surveyor and politician
- Mary Cleophas Foley (1845–1928), American Catholic nun
- Mary Cleophas Garvin (1899–1990), American mathematician and nun
- Nathaniel Cleophas Davis (1888–1972), American musician

== See also ==
- Cleophus
