= Frank O'Brien Wilson =

Soldier, cricketer (1876–1962)

Personal information
- Full name: Frank O'Brien Wilson
- Born: 30 April 1883; Biarritz, Nouvelle-Aquitaine, France
- Died: 7 April 1962 (aged 78); Nairobi, Kenya
- Batting: Unknown
- Bowling: Unknown

Domestic team information
- Years: Team
- 1905/06: Europeans
- 1909: Devon

Career statistics
Competition	First-class
Matches	1
Runs scored	9
Batting average	4.50
100s/50s	–/–
Top score	8
Balls bowled	192
Wickets	0
Bowling average	–
5 wickets in innings	–
10 wickets in match	–
Best bowling	–
Catches/stumpings	–/–
- Source: ESPNcricinfo, 9 December 2022

Sir Frank O'Brien Wilson CMG DSO (9 April 1876 – 7 April 1962) was a retired Royal Navy officer who settled in the Colony of Kenya. A volunteer in the East African Campaign of World War I, Wilson had a large property near Machakos, where he initially farmed ostriches and later raised cattle. He also played first-class cricket, and was a pioneer of cricket in Kenya.

== Early life ==
Wilson was born at Biarritz, France, and raised at Cliffe Hall, his father's property on the southern bank of the River Tees (lying west of Darlington, County Durham, in what is now the district of Richmondshire, North Yorkshire). His father, Col. John Gerald Wilson CB, was an officer in the York and Lancaster Regiment, and died of wounds during the Boer War, at Tweebosch. Frank Wilson was one of seven children, and the youngest of four brothers. The oldest brother, Lt. Richard Bassett Wilson, was also killed in the Boer War, at Rustenburg. The second brother, Lt.-Col. Sir Murrough John Wilson, was a Conservative MP for Richmond, while the third brother, Lt.-Col. Denis Daly Wilson MC, was killed in action in France during the First World War. The brothers' nephew through their youngest sister was James Ramsden, a Cabinet member as the final Secretary of State for War.

== Career ==
Unlike his brothers, all army officers, Frank Wilson enlisted in the Royal Navy. He served from 1897 to 1910, including for a period on the China station.

While in India in February 1906, Wilson played his only match of first-class cricket, appearing for the Europeans against the Hindus in the Bombay Presidency Match. He opened the Europeans' bowling in that game, but failed to take a wicket, and was also unsuccessful with the bat, scoring only nine runs across two innings. Later in the month, he also appeared for the Bombay Gymkhana against the touring Ceylonese side, where he opened both the batting and the bowling, taking six wickets for the match. During the 1909 English season, Wilson appeared in five minor counties matches for Devon. He opened the batting in all five matches, and also bowled occasionally, taking a five-wicket haul, 5/6, in his last minor counties match, against Carmarthenshire. Wilson had previously turned out for the Royal Navy Cricket Club on three occasions – against the Marylebone Cricket Club (MCC) in 1906, and against the Army team in 1908 and 1909. He had recorded a five-wicket haul in the game against the MCC, 5/38, despite being the seventh bowler brought on to bowl. All of his matches for the Navy were played at Lord's.

== Life in Kenya ==
Upon retiring from the navy in 1910, Wilson, in partnership with Maj. Frank Joyce, established a property of 23,000 acres (93 km^{2}) at Ulu, Kenya (near Machakos), where they initially farmed ostriches. On the outbreak of the First World War, he established a unit of volunteers, Wilson's Scouts, which was incorporated into the East African Mounted Rifles and saw service in the East African Campaign. Wilson was later attached to a South African division, where he oversaw military transport along the Rufiji River, in present-day Tanzania. He was awarded the DSO for his service during the war, with his partner, Joyce, receiving the MC. When the pair returned to their property, Kilima Kiu, many of their ostriches had been killed, and they turned to dairy farming. Kilima Kiu was at one stage the "largest dairy farm in all East Africa", but Wilson and Joyce divided it between themselves in 1934, after a quarrel. In later years, Wilson's farm held 2,500 cattle and employed over 400 staff, managed largely by his two sons. He also bred Arabian horses. Under a policy of self-containment, the property had its own factory, pasteurisation facilities, cannery, school, and airstrip. Wilson was also involved in public life in Kenya, briefly representing Ukamba in the Legislative Council of Kenya, and later chairing the Board of Agriculture, for which he was made a CMG in 1935 and knighted in 1949. He remained a keen cricketer, and was a pioneer of the sport in Kenya, serving as vice-president of the Kenya Kongonis Cricket Club.

== Personal life ==
Wilson had married Elizabeth Frances Pease, a daughter of Sir Arthur Pease, 1st Baronet, in 1919, with whom he had four children. He died at Kilima Kiu in 1962. He and Frank Joyce both feature in the memoirs of Elspeth Huxley.
