= Vijay Bharadwaj =

Indian cricketer and cricket coach

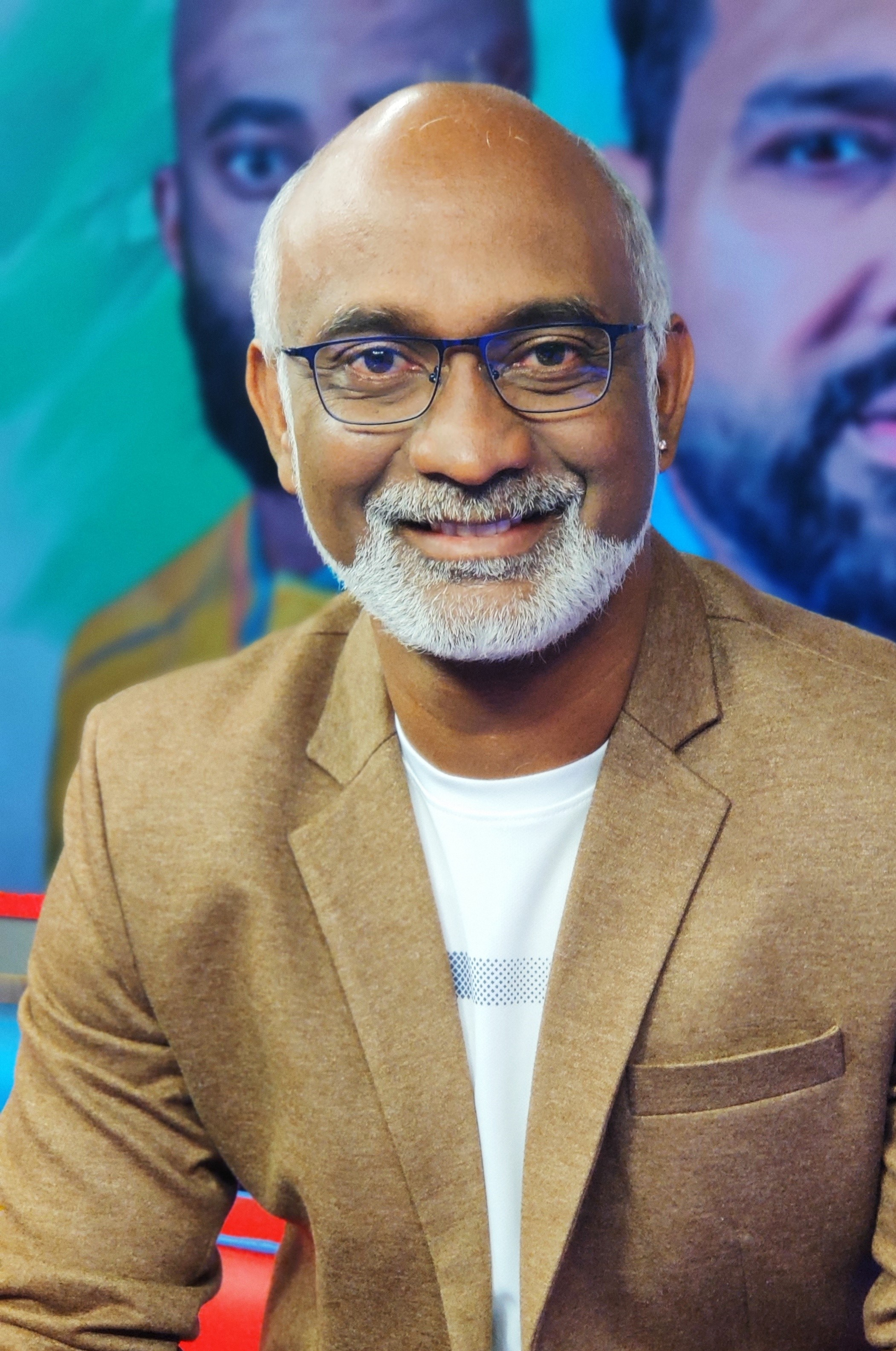
- Bharadwaj in 2024

Personal information
- Full name: Raghvendrarao Vijay Bharadwaj
- Born: 15 August 1975 (age 51); Bengaluru, Karnataka, India
- Batting: Right-handed
- Bowling: Right-arm offbreak

Career statistics
| Competition | Test | ODI | FC |
|---|---|---|---|
| Matches | 3 | 10 | 96 |
| Runs scored | 28 | 136 | 5,553 |
| Batting average | 9.35 | 27.21 | 41.75 |
| 100s/50s | 0/0 | 0/0 | 14/26 |
| Top score | 22 | 41* | 207* |
| Balls bowled | 247 | 372 | 4,155 |
| Wickets | 1 | 16 | 59 |
| Bowling average | 107.00 | 19.18 | 34.62 |
| 5 wickets in innings | 0 | 0 | 2 |
| 10 wickets in match | 0 | 0 | 0 |
| Best bowling | 1/26 | 3/34 | 6/24 |
| Catches/stumpings | 3/– | 4/– | 94/– |
- Source: ESPNcricinfo, 19 May 2025

Raghvendrarao Vijay Bharadwaj (born 15 August 1975) is an Indian cricket coach and commentator, former professional cricketer. He was a right-handed batsman and right-arm offbreak bowler. He won the Man of the Series award on his debut one day international series against South Africa in the LG Cup in Kenya in the 1999–2000 season.

He was a key architect of Karnataka's three Ranji Trophy triumphs in the 1990s.

He was the chairman of selection committee for under-19 Karnataka team as well. He was also the fielding coach of Oman for 2016 ICC World Twenty20. Currently he is one of the leading cricket commentators in Kannada. He joined Delhi Capitals as the head of the talent scout wing for IPL edition 2025.

== Domestic career ==
Bharadwaj made his Ranji Trophy debut for Karnataka in 1994. In his first-class career spanning from 1994 to 2006, he played in 96 matches, scoring 5553 runs and grabbing 59 wickets. A slipped-disc problem that afflicted his lower back during India's tour of Australia in 2000 under Sachin Tendulkar's captaincy, undid Bharadwaj's career. Though he recovered from the injury, he not able to replicate his form from the 1998–99 domestic season when he scored 1463 runs and grabbed 21 crucial wickets to help Karnataka defeat Madhya Pradesh in the Ranji final, close on the heels of its earlier titles in the 97-98 and 95–96 seasons. Bharadwaj last played for Karnataka in the 2004–05 season. He also played for Jharkhand in 2005 for the Ranji Trophy Plate League, after being overlooked by the selectors of the Karnataka team.

His domestic career was cut short by eye operation that went wrong.

== International career ==
Bharadwaj was first called up to the Indian national team in the 1999–2000 season after an impressive season in Indian domestic cricket in which he scored more than 1000 runs. He made his ODI debut in the LG Cup in Nairobi and initially impressed with his bowling in particular. Where he got 10 wickets at an impressive average of 12.20 and also scoring 89 crucial unbeaten runs lower down the order, all through the tournament. He was a part of the Karnataka's three Ranji Trophy triumphs in the 90's captained Karnataka from 2000 to 2002 was one of the seven players to represent the Indian team during the 90's.

He continued to produce strong performances in domestic cricket which caught the selector's eyes and allowed him to stay within contention, but other than a 2003 tour with the India A team against England he did not get further opportunities at international level. He played his last ODI in 2002 against Zimbabwe at Guwahati.

== Coaching career ==
Bharadwaj retired from all forms of cricket on 4 November 2006. He took up coaching after retirement and is a qualified level three coach certified from National Cricket Academy, Bangalore. He was a part of the Royal Challengers Bangalore squad in the first three seasons of the Indian Premier League as an assistant coach. Bharadwaj appeared on a Kannada television channel as part of a Cricket panel as an analyst. He was the fielding coach of the Oman cricket team along with his teammate Sunil Joshi who is spin bowling coach.

Bharadwaj was a part of the Karnataka first class team as a coach and also was the assistant coach for RCB for three years. He was a managing committee member of KSCA for one term when cricketers looked after administration. He has been on panel discussion on tv9 and news9 for 10 years.

== Achievements ==
- Man of the Series in the four nation tournament- LG Cup in Kenya (1999–2000)
- National record for the highest number of runs in a calendar year in the Ranji Trophy in the year 1998–99
- Winner of Ranji Trophy 4 times 1996, 1998, 1999 and 2002
- Member of a Irani Trophy winning team 1996, 1998
- Scored 16 first class hundreds in nearly 100 first class matches
- Scored more than 5500 runs in first class cricket
