= Kenyan cricket team in Scotland in 2008 =

	Kenya	Scotland
- Dates: 7 August 2008 – 13 August 2008
Captains	Steve Tikolo	Ryan Watson

One Day International series
- Results: 2-match series drawn 0–0
Most runs	Thomas Odoyo 45; Alex Obanda 24; Morris Ouma 21	Ryan Watson 17; Gavin Hamilton 9
Most wickets	Thomas Odoyo 1	Ryan Watson & Dewald Nel & John Blain 2 Craig Wright 1

The Kenya national cricket team toured Scotland in 2008. They played one first class match and two One Day Internationals against Scotland.

== Only First Class Match ==
7–10 August
(scorecard)

Kenya	v	Scotland

Match abandoned without a ball bowled.
Titwood, Glasgow, Scotland
Umpires: Paul Baldwin (GER) & Simon Taufel (AUS)

- Rain washed out days 1, 2, 3 and 4. Match abandoned due to rain.

== ODI series ==
=== 1st ODI ===
12 August
(Scorecard)

Kenya; 141/8 (35 overs)	v	Scotland; 31/1 (8.1 overs)
Thomas Odoyo 45 (39); Ryan Watson 2/9 (5 overs)		Ryan Watson 17* (22); Thomas Odoyo 1/13 (4.1 overs)

No result
Cambusdoon New Ground, Ayr, Scotland
Umpires: Paul Baldwin (GER) & Simon Taufel (AUS)

- Rain in first innings shortened match to 35 overs a side. Rain in second innings caused the match to be abandoned.

=== 2nd ODI ===
13 August
(scorecard)

Kenya	v	Scotland

Match abandoned without a ball bowled
Cambusdoon New Ground, Ayr, Scotland
Umpires: Paul Baldwin (GER) & Simon Taufel

- Rain caused the match to be abandoned.
