= Zafir Din =

Kenyan cricketer

Personal information
- Full name: Zafir Zulfiqar Din
- Born: 22 April 1977 (age 49); Nairobi, Kenya
- Batting: Left-handed
- Bowling: Leg break googly

Career statistics
Competition	First-class
Matches	1
Runs scored	0
Batting average	–
100s/50s	–/–
Top score	0*
Balls bowled	24
Wickets	0
Bowling average	–
5 wickets in innings	–
10 wickets in match	–
Best bowling	–
Catches/stumpings	–/–
- Source: Cricinfo, 20 September 2021

Zafir Zulfiqar Din (born 28 April 1977) is a Kenyan former first-class cricketer.

Din was born at Nairobi in April 1977. He made his only appearance in first-class cricket for Kenya against a touring England A team at Nairobi in 1998. He bowled four wicketless overs in the match with his leg break googly bowling, and was unbeaten without scoring in the Kenyan first innings. In 2011, he set up the Legend Cricket Academy based at the Jaffery Sports Club in Mombasa, alongside Steve Tikolo, Thomas Odoyo, Sibtain Kassamali, and Bapa Juma Abbas. The aim of the academy was to arrest the decline of cricket in Kenya.
