= LG Cup =

LG Cup may refer to several international competitions organized by the South Korean conglomerate LG Corporation:

- LG Cup (association football), international football competition
- LG Cup (baseball), international women's baseball competition
- LG Cup (snooker), former name of Grand Prix, later the World Open, a professional snooker tournament
- LG Cup (Go), board game Go competition
- LG Cup in Kenya in 1999–2000, cricket ODI tournament
