= LG Cup in Kenya in 1999–2000 =

LG Cup in Kenya
- Dates: 25 September – 3 October 1999
- Cricket format: One Day International
- Tournament format(s): Round robin and final
- Host: Kenya
- Champions: South Africa
- Participants: India; Kenya; South Africa; Zimbabwe
- Matches: 7
- Player of the series: (India) Vijay Bhardwaj
- Most runs: (India) Sourav Ganguly (208)
- Most wickets: (India) Vijay Bhardwaj (10) (India) Nikhil Chopra (10)

The LG Cup 1999–2000 was a four team cricket ODI tournament held in Kenya. After the round robin stage, the final took place between South Africa and India. Despite only making his international debut in India's opening game of the tournament, Vijay Bharadwaj won the man of the series award. The tournament was dominated by the bowlers, with the best bowling figures being Sunil Joshi's 5 wickets for 6 runs off his full 10 overs, one of the most economical figures of all time. With the bat, no player passed 50 twice in the series and only Ganguly and Lance Klusener made hundreds.

== Squads ==
India	Kenya	South Africa	Zimbabwe
Ajay Jadeja (c); Vijay Bharadwaj; Nikhil Chopra; Rahul Dravid; Sourav Ganguly; Sunil Joshi; Mohammad Kaif; Sadagoppan Ramesh; Jacob Martin; Debashish Mohanty; MSK Prasad (wk); Venkatesh Prasad; Laxmi Ratan Shukla; Robin Singh	Maurice Odumbe (c); Josephat Ababu; Jimmy Kamande; Hitesh Modi; Thomas Odoyo; Peter Ongondo; Francis Otieno; Kennedy Otieno (wk); Ravindu Shah; Mohammed Sheikh; Tony Suji; Martin Suji; Steve Tikolo; Alpesh Vadher	Hansie Cronje (c); Paul Adams; Dale Benkenstein; Mark Boucher (wk); Derek Crookes; Alan Dawson; Boeta Dippenaar; Steve Elworthy; Herschelle Gibbs; Jacques Kallis; Lance Klusener; Victor Mpitsang; Shaun Pollock; Jonty Rhodes	Alistair Campbell (c); Andy Blignaut; Stuart Carlisle; Andrew Flower (wk); Grant Flower; Murray Goodwin; Neil Johnson; Pommie Mbangwa; David Mutendera; Henry Olonga; Gavin Rennie; Paul Strang; Andrew Whittall; Guy Whittall

== Points table ==
Place	Team	Played	Won	Lost	Points	NetRR
1	India	3	3	0	6	+2.037
2	South Africa	3	2	1	4	-0.233
3	Zimbabwe	3	1	2	2	-1.209
4	Kenya	3	0	3	0	-0.572

== Matches ==
=== Group stage ===
25 September 1999
Scorecard

Kenya; 199/8 (50 overs)	v	Zimbabwe; 200/7 (49.2 overs)
Ravindu Shah 71 (100); Guy Whittall 3/29 (10 overs)		Murray Goodwin 76* (105); Steve Tikolo 3/22 (9 overs)

Zimbabwe won by 3 wickets
Gymkhana Club Ground, Nairobi
Umpires: Eddie Nicholls (Win) and Athar Zaidi (Pak)
Player of the match: Murray Goodwin (Zim)

- Zimbabwe won the toss and elected to field.
- Josephat Ababu (Ken) and David Mutendera (Zim) made their ODI debut.
- Zimbabwe 2, Kenya 0.

26 September 1999
Scorecard

South Africa; 117 (48 overs)	v	India; 120/2 (22.4 overs)
Jacques Kallis 38 (110); Sunil Joshi 5/6 (10 overs)		Sourav Ganguly 38 (51); Derek Crookes 2/47 (8.4 overs)

India won by 8 wickets
Gymkhana Club Ground, Nairobi
Umpires: George Sharp (Eng) and Eddie Nicholls (Win)
Player of the match: Sunil Joshi (Ind)

- South Africa won the toss and elected to bat.
- Vijay Bharadwaj (Ind) and Boeta Dippenaar (RSA) made their ODI debut.
- India 2, South Africa 0

28 September 1999
Scorecard

Zimbabwe; 216 (47.4 overs)	v	South Africa; 217/1 (35 overs)
Grant Flower 91 (120); Alan Dawson 3/36 (9 overs)		Lance Klusener 101* (105); Guy Whittall 1/46 (10 overs)

South Africa won by 9 wickets
Gymkhana Club Ground, Nairobi
Umpires: George Sharp (Eng) and Athar Zaidi (Pak)
Player of the match: Lance Klusener (RSA)

- Grant Flower's 91 was the highest individual score by a Zimbabwe player against South Africa.
- South Africa 2, Zimbabwe 0.

29 September 1999
Scorecard

India; 220/7 (50 overs)	v	Kenya; 162 (50 overs)
Sadagoppan Ramesh 50 (117); Maurice Odumbe 3/51 (8 overs)		Thomas Odoyo 33 (60); Venkatesh Prasad 3/26 (9 overs)

India won by 58 runs
Gymkhana Club Ground, Nairobi
Umpires: Eddie Nicholls (Win) and Athar Zaidi (Pak)
Player of the match: Vijay Bharadwaj (Ind)

- Kenya won the toss and elected to field.
- India 2, Kenya 0.

30 September 1999
Scorecard

South Africa; 220/7 (50 overs)	v	Kenya; 196 (48.1 overs)
Jonty Rhodes 45 (46); Tony Suji 2/24 (7 overs)		Steve Tikolo 67 (87); Shaun Pollock 3/10 (8.1 overs)

South Africa won by 24 runs
Gymkhana Club Ground, Nairobi
Umpires: George Sharp (Eng) and Eddie Nicholls (Win)
Player of the match: Steve Tikolo (Ken)

- Kenya won the toss and elected to field.
- Peter Ongondo (Ken) made his ODI debut.
- South Africa 2, Kenya 0.

1 October 1999
Scorecard

India; 277/6 (50 overs)	v	Zimbabwe; 170 (38.3 overs)
Sourav Ganguly 139 (147); Guy Whittall 3/55 (10 overs)		Neil Johnson 52 (67); Nikhil Chopra 4/33 (8.3 overs)

India won by 107 runs
Gymkhana Club Ground, Nairobi
Umpires: George Sharp (Eng) and Eddie Nicholls (Win)
Player of the match: Sourav Ganguly (Ind)

- Zimbabwe won the toss and elected to field.
- Robin Singh played his 100th ODI.
- India 2, Zimbabwe 0.

=== Final ===
3 October 1999
Scorecard

South Africa; 235/9 (50 overs)	v	India; 209 (47.3 overs)
Herschelle Gibbs 84 (124); Vijay Bharadwaj 3/34 (8 overs)		MSK Prasad 63 (90); Derek Crookes 3/47 (9 overs)

South Africa won by 26 runs
Gymkhana Club Ground, Nairobi
Umpires: George Sharp (Eng) and Eddie Nicholls (Win)
Player of the match: Herschelle Gibbs (RSA)

- India won the toss and elected to field.
- South Africa won the LG Cup.

The final took place between South Africa and India on 3 October. India won the toss and sent South Africa into bat. They made 235 from their 50 overs with an innings of 84 from Herschelle Gibbs being the highest. Vijay Bharadwaj took three wickets but perhaps the best spell came from Venkatesh Prasad who bowled 5 maidens in his 10 overs. His namesake, MSK Prasad contributed 63 runs in their chase but it wasn't enough as Jacques Kallis took the final wicket to give the South Africans a 26 run victory.
