= Njuguna =

Njuguna is a surname. Notable people with the surname include:

- Alfred Njuguna, Kenyan cricket player and coach
- Eric Njuguna (born c.2003), Kenyan climate activist
