= Jadavji Jesani =

Kenyan cricketer (born 1981)

Personal information
- Full name: Jadhavji Shah Jesani
- Born: 28 December 1981 (age 44); Bhuj, Gujarat, India
- Batting: Right-handed
- Bowling: Right-arm off break
- Role: Occasional wicket-keeper

International information
- National side: Kenya
- Only T20I (cap 2): 1 September 2007 v Bangladesh

Career statistics
Competition	T20I	T20
Matches	1	1
Runs scored	1	1
Batting average	1.00	1.00
100s/50s	–/–	–/–
Top score	1	1
Balls bowled	–	–
Wickets	–	–
Bowling average	–	–
5 wickets in innings	–	–
10 wickets in match	–	–
Best bowling	–	–
Catches/stumpings	–/–	–/–
- Source: CricketArchive, 20 January 2011

Jadavji Shah Jesani (born 28 December 1981, in India) is a Kenyan cricketer. He made his debut for Kenya in their first ever Twenty20 International against Bangladesh in September 2007. This is to date his only appearance for the national team.
