= Arvind Kandappah =

Sri-Lankan Canadian cricketer (born 1971)

Personal information
- Full name: Arvindah Luxman Kandappah
- Born: 7 March 1971 (age 55); Colombo, Sri Lanka
- Batting: Right-handed
- Role: Batsman

International information
- National side: Canada
- ODI debut (cap 50): 18 October 2007 v Kenya
- Last ODI: 20 October 2007 v Kenya

Career statistics
Competition	ODI	First-class
Matches	2	5
Runs scored	97	250
Batting average	97.00	31.25
100s/50s	0/1	0/3
Top score	69*	87
Catches/stumpings	0/–	2/–
- Source: CricketArchive, 27 September 2008

Arvindah Luxman Kandappah (born 7 March 1971) is a Sri Lankan-born Canadian cricketer. He is a right-handed middle order batsman.

Kandappah started his international career well, scoring 69 not out against Kenya on his One Day International debut, and 87 against the same opponent in his maiden first class match.
