= Cricket in Kenya =

- Country: Kenya
- National team: Kenya

International competitions
- Cricket World Cup; ICC World Twenty20; ICC Champions Trophy; Women's Cricket World Cup; Under-19 Cricket World Cup

Cricket is a popular sport in Kenya. Kenya has competed in the Cricket World Cup since 1996. They upset some of the world's best teams and reached semi-finals of the 2003 tournament. They also won the inaugural World Cricket League Division 1 hosted in Nairobi and participated in the World T20. Their most successful player is Steve Tikolo, who captained the team to the semi-finals of the 2003 Cricket World Cup

Cricket has always been played only at club level in cities like Nairobi, Kisumu, Nakuru and central province. But there never was a competition where these cities played each other until the Zonal League was started.

== History ==
=== Historical background ===
Following initial colonisation by the Portuguese, Kenya gradually came under British influence in the latter part of the 19th century and in the first half of the 20th century. Cricket was probably introduced to the country in the 1880s.

=== Early developments ===
The first match of note was "East African Protectorate v Rest of the World" at Mombasa in December 1899.

From 1910, a series of games called Officials v Settlers was established and ran until 1964.

In 1914, a Kenyan team crossed the border into Uganda and defeated their hosts by 5 wickets at Entebbe.

== Governing body ==
Cricket Kenya is the official ICC recognised organisation chosen to represent Kenya in terms of cricket issues. Kenya broke away from the East and Central Africa Cricket Conference in 1981 and joined the ICC in their own right as an Associate member. Cricket Kenya are also Associate members of the African Cricket Association.

== Domestic competitions ==
The National cricket competition in Kenya is also known as Zonal League. It is a four team cricket competition created by Cricket Kenya featuring a Twenty20 tournament, a one day cricket tournament and finally a three-day cricket tournament. For the inaugural league four teams will be competing consisting of the 60 best players according to Cricket Kenya from Kenya.

The first edition of the competition involved four franchises, namely The Northern Nomads, The Eastern Aces, The Southern Stars, and The Western Chiefs. The teams were captained by National team players, Steve Tikolo, Thomas Odoyo, Kennedy Obuya, and Peter Ongondo in 2008. The inaugural T20 Competition, played in February 2008, was won by the Eastern Aces, while the first 50 over competition was won by the Northern Nomads, However the three day format of the competition was postponed due to unfavourable weather and was played in June 2008. Further difficulties in availability of players, many of whom were in school, meant that the first season of the three-dayers had to be compressed to two days per match. The league was sponsored by South African Sahara Computers, African Cricket Association and others in 2008.

Following a lack of interest from contracted players and insufficient funding, the league was not held in 2009 and 2010, and has been replaced in 2011 by two new competitions; the East African Cup (50 overs a side) and the East Africa Premier League (Twenty20) (see below)

== Former Elite League Teams ==
- The Eastern Aces captained by Steve Tikolo
- The Northern Nomads captained by Thomas Odoyo
- The Western Chiefs captained by Peter Ongondo
- The Southern Stars captained by Kennedy Otieno

== East African Cup and East Africa Premier League ==
In 2011, as part of a radical shakeup of cricket in the country following poor performances by the national team at the 2011 Cricket World Cup, and in response to a huge gap in standards between the national side and the country's existing leagues, Cricket Kenya launched two new franchise based competitions. Season 2011/12 saw the launch of the 50 over a side East African Cup, and the Twenty20 East Africa Premier League.

In addition to teams from Kenya, two teams from neighbouring Uganda were also awarded franchises, to ensure further development of playing standards, and to create more rivalry with Kenyan-based sides.

Four teams from Kenya will participate

- Nairobi Buffaloes
- Kongonis (based in Nairobi)
- Rift Valley Rhinos from Nakuru
- Coast Pekee in Mombasa

and two teams from Uganda

- Rwenzori Warriors
- Nile Knights

Teams are composed of international players, senior club players and age group cricketers aiming to make the national squads of both countries. The top two teams in each competition compete in live televised finals.

Cricket Kenya has agreed a broadcast deal with Supersport who will televise a number of live matches throughout Africa as well as a regular highlights and magazine programme.

== Cricket grounds ==
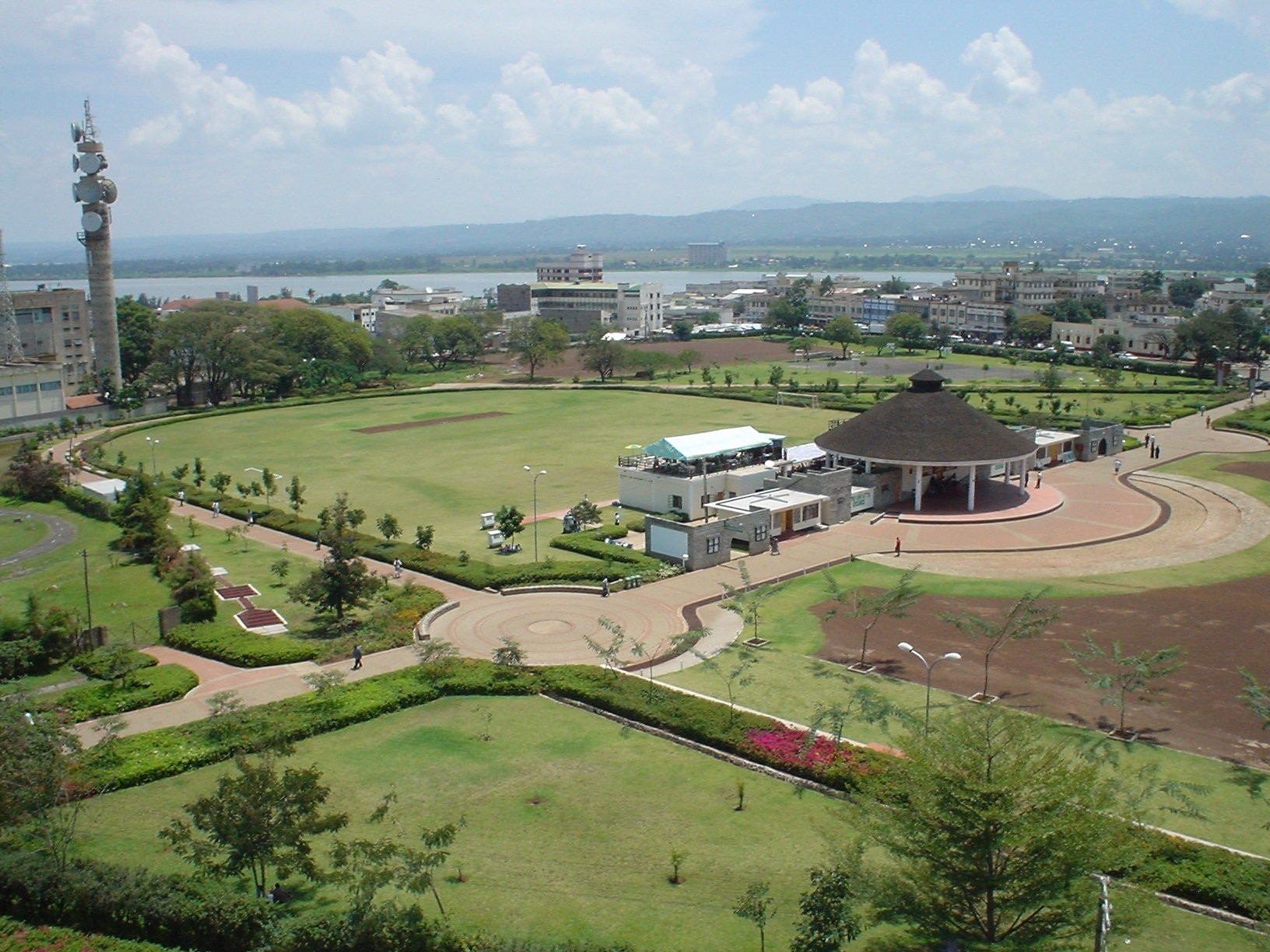
View of Jomo Kenyatta Sports Ground in Kisumu

There are several cricket venues in Nairobi accredited with full ODI status. The Ruaraka Sports Club Ground played host to the 1994 ICC Trophy final. Aga Khan Sports Club Ground and Nairobi Club Ground have hosted One Day Internationals and the Nairobi Gymkhana Club hosted two matches during the 2003 Cricket World Cup.

The Mombasa Sports Club ground is the only fully accredited ODI Cricket ground in Kenya outside of Nairobi. The Jaffery Sports Club Mombasa is the only cricket ground in Kenya where cricket can be played under lights. Rift Valley Sports Club in Nakuru has been given a major uplift for the under-19 world cup. Jomo Kenyatta Sports Grounds in Kisumu has got a turf wicket

== National team ==
Pushkar Sharma made his debut for the national cricket team of Kenya in the 2020s

The East Africa cricket team represented Kenya, Tanzania and Uganda. Their first game was against a South African Non-European team in 1958. Kenya was represented by the East Africa team in the 1975 World Cup and the 1979 ICC Trophies.

The Kenya national cricket team have One Day International status until 2013.

== See also ==
- Sport in Kenya
