= Narendra Thakker =

Kenyan cricketer

Personal information
- Full name: Narendra P. Thakker
- Born: 1945 (age 80–81); Mombasa, Kenya
- Role: Wicket-keeper

International information
- National side: East Africa (1972–1982)
- Source: CricketArchive, 2 February 2016

Narendra P. Thakker (born 1945) is a Kenyan former cricketer who played internationally for East Africa, including at the 1979 and 1982 ICC Trophies. He played as a wicket-keeper.

A regular player for Kenya in regional tournaments, Thakker first played for East Africa in 1972, when he toured England and played against several county teams. He played his one and only first-class match in January 1974, against a Marylebone Cricket Club team that was returning the tour. In the match, played at Nairobi's Gymkhana Club Ground, he opened the batting with Jagoo Shah in both innings, scoring one run in the first innings and 22 in the second. At the 1979 ICC Trophy in England, Thakker shared East Africa's captaincy with Charanjive Sharma, with each player captaining the team in two of its four matches. His best performance was 44 not out against Argentina. At the 1982 edition of the tournament, where he made his last international appearances, Thakker shared the wicket-keeping duties with Raghuvir Patel. He was one of the few East African players at the tournament with first-class experience.

== See also ==
- List of Kenyan first-class cricketers
