= Cleophus =

Cleophus is a masculine given name. Notable people with the name include:

== Given name ==
- Cleophus Cooksey Jr. (born 1982), American serial killer
- Cleophus "Cid" Edwards (1943–2013), American football player
- Cleophus Hatcher (1925–1983), American football coach
- Cleophus Littleton (born 1932), American basketball player
- Cleophus Miller (born 1951), American football player
- Cleophus Prince Jr. (born 1967), American serial killer
- Cleophus Robinson (1932–1998), American gospel singer and preacher

== Middle name ==
- Arnett Cleophus Cobb (1918–1989), American tenor saxophonist

== See also ==
- Cleophas (given name)
