= Sagar Karia =

Kenyan cricketer

Personal information
- Full name: Sagar Rohit Karia
- Born: 3 June 1988 (age 38); Mombasa, Coast Province, Kenya
- Batting: Right-handed
- Bowling: Right-arm medium
- Relatives: Ashish Karia (brother)

Domestic team information
- Years: Team
- 2006/07: Kenya Select

Career statistics
Competition	First-class
Matches	1
Runs scored	22
Batting average	11.00
100s/50s	–/–
Top score	11
Balls bowled	26
Wickets	–
Bowling average	–
5 wickets in innings	–
10 wickets in match	–
Best bowling	–
Catches/stumpings	–/–
- Source: Cricinfo, 19 September 2021

Sagar Rohit Karia (born 3 June 1988) is a Kenyan former first-class cricketer.

Karia was born at Mombasa in June 1988. He made what would be his only appearance in first-class cricket for Kenya Select against Zimbabwe A at Harare in 2007. Batting twice in the match, he was dismissed for 11 runs in the Kenyan first innings by Keith Dabengwa, while in their second innings he was dismissed for the same score by Timycen Maruma. He played his club cricket for Mombasa Sports Club, making a century for the club in 2017. His brother, Ashish, also played first-class cricket.
