= Raghuvir Patel =

Kenyan cricketer

Personal information
- Full name: Raghuvir Mothibhai Patel
- Born: 1944 (age 81–82); Kenya
- Role: Wicket-keeper

International information
- National side: East Africa (1972–1982)
- Source: CricketArchive, 2 February 2016

Raghuvir Mothibhai Patel (born 1944) is a Kenyan former cricketer who played internationally for East Africa, including at the 1982 ICC Trophy. He played as a wicket-keeper.

A regular player for Kenya in regional tournaments, Patel first played for East Africa in 1972, when he toured in England with the team. He played his one and only first-class match in January 1974, against a Marylebone Cricket Club team that was returning the tour. In the match, Patel had little success with the bat, but did have future England captain Mike Brearley out caught behind from the bowling of Vasant Tapu. He did not again play internationally until the 1982 ICC Trophy in England, where he shared the wicket-keeping duties with Narendra Thakker. He was one of the few East African players at the tournament with first-class experience.

== See also ==
- List of Kenyan first-class cricketers
