= James Ngoche =

Kenyan cricketer (born 1988)

Personal information
- Full name: James Otieno Ngoche
- Born: 29 January 1988 (age 38); Nairobi, Kenya
- Batting: Right-handed
- Bowling: Right-arm offbreak
- Role: Bowler
- Relatives: Nehemiah Odhiambo (brother); Lameck Onyango (brother); Shem Ngoche (brother); Margaret Ngoche (sister)

International information
- National side: Kenya
- ODI debut (cap 41): 1 July 2010 v Ireland
- Last ODI: 30 June 2013 v Scotland
- T20I debut (cap 22): 22 February 2012 v Ireland
- Last T20I: 20 April 2013 v Netherlands

Domestic team information
- Years: Team
- Western Chiefs

Career statistics
| Competition | ODI | T20I | FC | LA |
|---|---|---|---|---|
| Matches | 17 | 7 | 5 | 30 |
| Runs scored | 35 | 4 | 11 | 45 |
| Batting average | 5.00 | 2.00 | 1.57 | 4.09 |
| 100s/50s | 0/0 | 0/0 | 0/0 | 0/0 |
| Top score | 21* | 2 | 6* | 21* |
| Balls bowled | 878 | 144 | 977 | 1,547 |
| Wickets | 20 | 4 | 15 | 41 |
| Bowling average | 28.45 | 35.00 | 35.13 | 22.60 |
| 5 wickets in innings | 0 | 0 | 1 | 1 |
| 10 wickets in match | 0 | 0 | 0 | 0 |
| Best bowling | 3/18 | 2/31 | 5/39 | 5/26 |
| Catches/stumpings | 6/– | 0/– | 3/– | 12/– |
- Source: ESPNcricinfo, 13 May 2017

James Otieno Ngoche (born 29 January 1988) is a Kenyan cricketer. Known for his off-spin bowling. He is the brother of three other Kenyan international cricketers, Lameck Onyango, Shem Ngoche and Nehemiah Odhiambo.

== Biography ==
Ngoche was one of three brothers, others being Shem and Nehemiah, in the Kenyan squad for the World Cup held in Bangladesh, India and Sri Lanka from 19 February to 2 April 2011.

== Suspension ==
He was suspended from bowling in international cricket in 2015 after the ICC found his action to be illegal.

In order to resume bowling, Ngoche was required to have his action cleared through an independent assessment at an ICC-accredited biomechanics laboratory. He underwent unofficial testing of his bowling action as part of his remedial work at the Pakistan Cricket Board's biomechanics centre at Lahore in August 2016.
