= Margaret Ngoche =

Kenyan cricketer

Personal information
- Born: 2 November 1981 (age 45); Nairobi, Kenya
- Batting: Right-handed
- Bowling: Right-arm medium
- Relatives: Lameck Onyango (brother); Nehemiah Odhiambo (brother); Shem Ngoche (brother); James Ngoche (brother)

International information
- National side: Kenya
- T20I debut (cap 7): 6 April 2019 v Zimbabwe
- Last T20I: 23 January 2022 v Malaysia

Career statistics
Competition	WT20I
Matches	18
Runs scored	284
Batting average	20.28
100s/50s	0/1
Top score	73
Balls bowled	138
Wickets	5
Bowling average	26.40
5 wickets in innings	0
10 wickets in match	0
Best bowling	3/14
Catches/stumpings	7/–
- Source: Cricinfo, 24 January 2022

Margaret Ngoche or Margaret Banja (born 2 November 1981) is a Kenyan cricketer and a former captain of the Kenya women's cricket team. Several of Ngoche's family members have played for the Kenyan team, including her brothers Lameck Onyango, Nehemiah Odhiambo, Shem Ngoche and James Ngoche, and her sister Mary Bele. Prior to playing cricket, Ngoche also played football for two years.

Ngoche was part of the Africa squad for the women's edition of the 2007 Afro-Asia Cup in India, and Kenya's team for the UAE International Women's T20 tournament, which took place in 2016.

In April 2019, Ngoche was named in Kenya's squad for their first ever Women's Twenty20 International (WT20I) matches, in the 2019 Victoria Tri-Series in Uganda. Ngoche made her WT20I debut on 6 April 2019, for Kenya against Zimbabwe at the Lugogo Cricket Oval in Kampala, top-scoring for the team with 27 runs. The following month, Ngoche was named as Kenya's captain for the 2019 ICC Women's Qualifier Africa tournament in Zimbabwe. In Kenya's second match of the tournament, against Sierra Leone, Ngoche was again the top-scorer for the team, with 73 runs, and she was named as the player of the match. In May 2021, Ngoche was again named as the captain of the Kenyan team, this time for the 2021 Kwibuka Women's T20 Tournament in Rwanda. Following the conclusion of the tournament, Ngoche was named as the captain of the team of the tournament, selected by the Rwanda Cricket Association.

In January 2022, Ngoche was named captain of Kenya's team for the 2022 Commonwealth Games Cricket Qualifier tournament in Malaysia.
