= Mohsin Ali (cricketer) =

Kenyan cricketer

Personal information
- Full name: Mohsin Ali
- Born: Kenya
- Batting: Unknown

Career statistics
| Competition | First-class |
|---|---|
| Matches | 1 |
| Runs scored | 47 |
| Batting average | 47.00 |
| 100s/50s | –/– |
| Top score | 47 |
| Catches/stumpings | 3/– |
- Source: Cricinfo, 19 September 2021

Mohsin Ali (date of birth unknown) is a Kenyan former first-class cricketer.

Ali made his only appearance in first-class cricket for Kenya Select against the touring Pakistan A cricket team at Nairobi in 2000. Batting once in the match, he was dismissed for 47 runs in the Kenyan first innings by Kashif Raza. In the field he also took three catches. With the regular Kenyan side striking, Ali was later selected in the Kenyan side to face Namibia in the Intercontinental Cup in October 2004, but did not make the starting eleven.
