= David Okumu =

Kenyan cricketer (born 1982)

Personal information
- Full name: Stephen David Okumu
- Born: 15 September 1982 (age 44); Kisumu, Nyanza Province, Kenya
- Batting: Right-handed
- Bowling: Right-arm medium-fast

Career statistics
Competition	First-class
Matches	1
Runs scored	2
Batting average	–
100s/50s	–/–
Top score	2*
Balls bowled	54
Wickets	0
Bowling average	–
5 wickets in innings	–
10 wickets in match	–
Best bowling	–
Catches/stumpings	–/–
- Source: Cricinfo, 19 September 2021

Stephen David Okumu (born 15 September 1982) is a Kenyan former first-class cricketer.

Okumu was born at Kisumu in September 1982. He made what would be his only appearance in first-class cricket for Kenya against a touring India A side at Nairobi in September 2004. He was selected in the Kenyan side for their 2004 Intercontinental Cup match against Namibia in October, but was pressured by his club side Swamibapa to withdraw. With the regular Kenyan side striking, Okumu was selected again in the Kenyan side to face Scotland in the semi-final of the Intercontinental Cup in November, but did not make the starting eleven. A year later he was once more called up to the Kenya squad to face Canada in the semi-final of the 2005 Intercontinental Cup, but once again did not make the starting eleven.
