= Shem Ngoche =

Kenyan cricketer (born 1989)

Personal information
- Full name: Shem Obado Ngoche
- Born: 6 June 1989 (age 37); Nairobi, Kenya
- Batting: Right-handed
- Bowling: Slow left-arm orthodox
- Role: Bowler
- Relatives: Nehemiah Odhiambo (brother); Lameck Onyango (brother); James Ngoche (brother); Margaret Ngoche (sister)

International information
- National side: Kenya (2010–present)
- ODI debut (cap 39): 16 February 2010 v Netherlands
- Last ODI: 30 January 2014 v Scotland
- T20I debut (cap 19): 1 February 2010 v Scotland
- Last T20I: 19 September 2026 v Uganda

Career statistics
Competition	ODI	T20I	FC	LA
Matches	14	98	3	62
Runs scored	68	552	93	484
Batting average	7.55	13.46	23.25	13.82
100s/50s	0/0	0/0	0/0	0/2
Top score	28	41*	35	66
Balls bowled	569	1,978	407	2,992
Wickets	12	117	9	73
Bowling average	35.91	16.54	16.66	28.19
5 wickets in innings	0	0	0	0
10 wickets in match	0	0	0	0
Best bowling	2/28	4/14	3/11	4/17
Catches/stumpings	0/–	33/0	3/–	15/–
- Source: Cricinfo, 5 May 2025

Shem Obado Ngoche (born 6 June 1989) is a Kenyan cricketer. He is the brother of three other Kenyan international cricketers, Lameck Onyango, James Ngoche and Nehemiah Odhiambo.

== International career ==
Ngoche was one of three brothers, others being James and Nehemiah, in the Kenyan squad for the 2011 Cricket World Cup held in Bangladesh, India and Sri Lanka. During the tournament, he batted three times and was dismissed for a golden duck each time. He did not hit any of the three deliveries he faced.

In January 2018, he was named in Kenya's squad for the 2018 ICC World Cricket League Division Two tournament. In September 2018, he was named in Kenya's squad for the 2018 Africa T20 Cup. The following month, he was named in Kenya's squad for the 2018 ICC World Cricket League Division Three tournament in Oman. Initially, Collins Obuya was named captain, but he was ruled out of Kenya's squad due to personal commitments, and Ngoche was named captain in his place. He was the leading wicket-taker for Kenya in the tournament, with six dismissals in five matches.

In May 2019, he was named as the captain of Kenya's squad for the Regional Finals of the 2018–19 ICC T20 World Cup Africa Qualifier tournament in Uganda. In September 2019, he was named as the captain of Kenya's squad for the 2019 ICC T20 World Cup Qualifier tournament in the United Arab Emirates. In November 2019, he was named in Kenya's squad for the Cricket World Cup Challenge League B tournament in Oman, but not as the team's captain.

In October 2021, he was named as the captain of Kenya's squad for the Regional Final of the 2021 ICC Men's T20 World Cup Africa Qualifier tournament in Rwanda.
