= Ashish Karia =

Kenyan cricketer

Personal information
- Full name: Ashish Vinod Karia
- Born: 4 June 1986 (age 40); Mombasa, Coast Province, Kenya
- Batting: Right-handed
- Bowling: Right-arm medium-fast
- Relatives: Sagar Karia (brother)

Career statistics
Competition	First-class
Matches	1
Runs scored	0
Batting average	0.00
100s/50s	–/–
Top score	0
Balls bowled	108
Wickets	3
Bowling average	20.33
5 wickets in innings	–
10 wickets in match	–
Best bowling	2/34
Catches/stumpings	–/–
- Source: Cricinfo, 19 September 2021

Ashish Vinod Karia (born 4 June 1986) is a Kenyan former first-class cricketer.

Karia was born at Mombasa in June 1986. He was part of the Kenya national under-19 cricket team squad that took in the 2002 Under-19 Cricket World Cup, playing in two Youth One Day Internationals during the tournament against the West Indies and Papua New Guinea under-19 cricket teams. He later made what would be his only appearance in first-class cricket for Kenya against the Netherlands in the 2006–07 Intercontinental Cup at Nairobi. In the Netherlands first innings, he took the wickets of Ryan ten Doeschate and Daan van Bunge, while in their second innings he took the wicket of Tim de Leede to finish with match figures of 3 for 61. Batting once in the match, he was dismissed without scoring by Dan van Bunge in the Kenyan first innings. His brother, Sagar, also played first-class cricket.
