= Sibtain Kassamali =

Kenyan cricketer (1963–2018)

Personal information
- Born: 24 March 1963
- Died: 27 October 2018 (aged 55)
- Source: Cricinfo, 30 April 2021

Sibtain Kassamali (24 March 1963 – 27 October 2018) was a Kenyan cricketer. He played in one first-class match for the Kenya cricket team in the 1986/87 season. Along with his first-class appearance, against a touring Pakistan side, Kassamali played in two editions of the ICC Trophy. Kassamali also worked as a selector for the Kenyan men's and women's national teams, and helped set up a cricket academy in the country.

Kassamali died on 27 October 2018, at the age of 55, in Mombasa after a short illness.
