= Sunil Joshi =

Indian cricketer (born 1970)

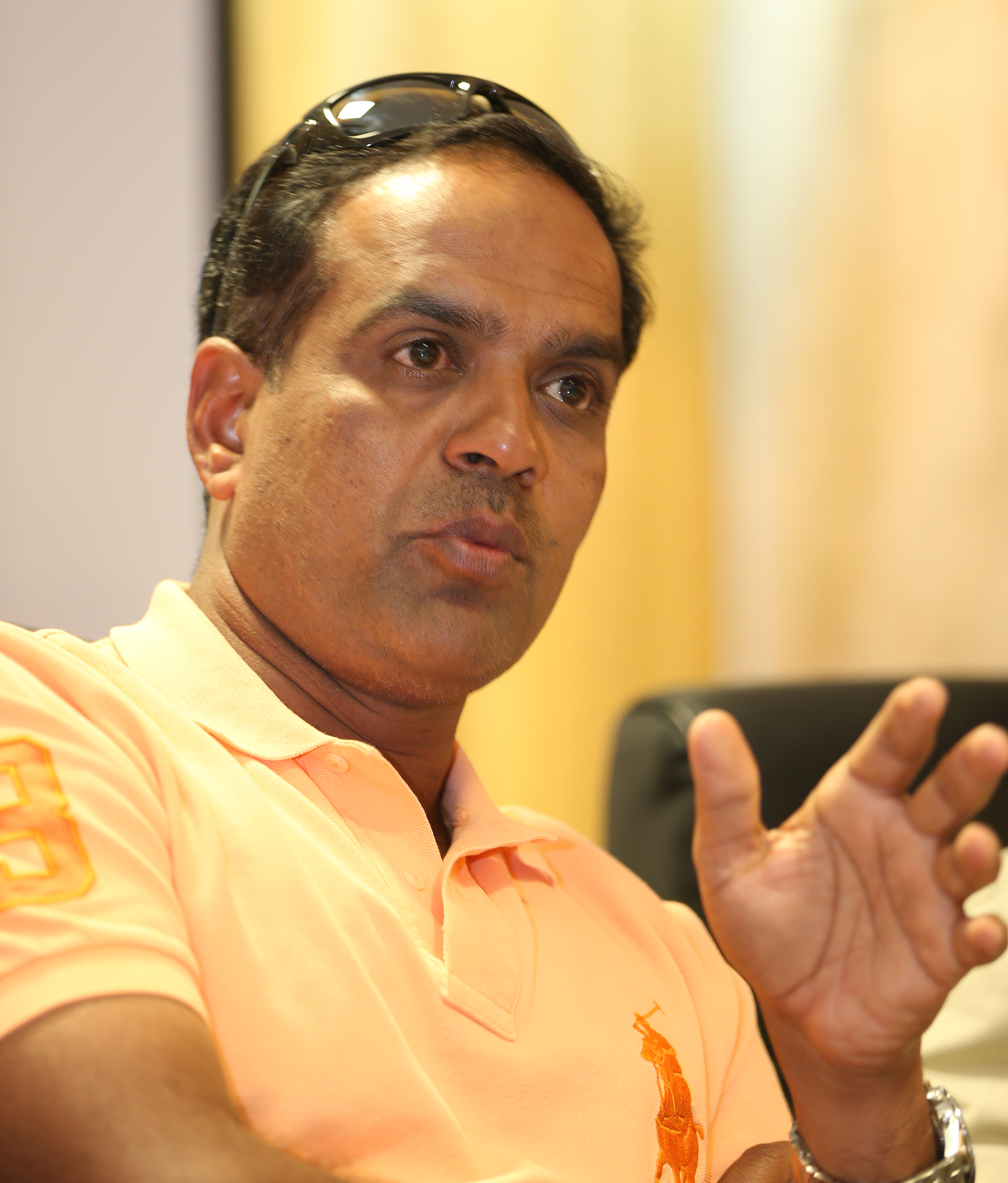
- Joshi in 2013

Personal information
- Full name: Sunil Bandacharya Joshi
- Born: 6 June 1970 (age 56); Gadag, Mysore State (present–day Karnataka), India
- Batting: Left-handed
- Bowling: Slow left-arm orthodox
- Role: All rounder

International information
- National side: India (1996–2001)
- Test debut (cap 202): 6 June 1996 v England
- Last Test: 25 November 2000 v Zimbabwe
- ODI debut (cap 98): 1 September 1996 v Zimbabwe
- Last ODI: 28 March 2001 v Australia

Domestic team information
- Years: Team
- 1992–2011: Karnataka
- 2008: Royal Challengers Bangalore

Career statistics
Competition	Test	ODI	FC	LA
Matches	15	69	160	163
Runs scored	352	584	5,129	1,729
Batting average	20.70	17.17	26.71	19.64
100s/50s	0/1	0/1	4/26	0/5
Top score	92	61*	118	64
Balls bowled	3,451	3386	38,251	8,164
Wickets	41	69	615	192
Bowling average	35.85	36.36	25.12	29.13
5 wickets in innings	1	1	31	2
10 wickets in match	0	0	5	0
Best bowling	5/142	5/6	7/29	5/6
Catches/stumpings	7/–	19/–	88/–	46/–
Medal record
Men's Cricket
Representing India
ICC Champions Trophy
Runner-up	2000 Kenya
- Source: ESPNcricinfo, 30 November 2015

Sunil Bandacharya Joshi (born 6 June 1970) is an Indian former cricketer and former selector of the India cricket team. He played as an all-rounder who bowled slow left arm spin and batted left-handed. Sunil Joshi was appointed as chief selector of the senior men's cricket team on 4 March 2020. He was a part of the squad which finished as runners-up at the 2000 ICC Champions Trophy.

== Early life ==
Sunil Joshi was born in a Hindu Madhwa Brahmin Family on 6 June 1970 in Gadag, Karnataka, India. He used to travel 40 miles (64 km) to Hubballi each morning for practice, and then returned to his native town of Gadag in time for school.

== Domestic career ==
At state level he played for Karnataka throughout his career. In the 1995–96 season of the Ranji Trophy he achieved the impressive double of scoring 500 runs and capturing 50 wickets. He also played briefly for the Bedfordshire County Cricket Club in England during the 2004 Minor Counties Cricket Championship.

Joshi represented the Royal Challengers Bangalore in the 2008 and 2009 seasons of the Indian Premier League and was under contract till 2010.

== International career ==
Joshi played both Test and One Day International cricket for India between 1996 and 2001. His usual role in the team was to provide runs from the lower order and act as a secondary spin bowler to support the likes of Anil Kumble. Despite being a regular in the national team during this period, he was not selected for the 1999 Cricket World Cup.

His most famous bowling performance for India came in an ODI match against South Africa in the LG Cup in 1999. He returned figures of 10–6–6–5 helping India to victory in that match. Three years later, the performance was rated in the Wisden 100 as the seventh-best ODI bowling performance to that date.

On 21 June 2012, Joshi formally announced his retirement from international and first-class cricket.

== Coaching career ==
Joshi has coached the Hyderabad cricket team and more recently has been a coach for Jammu & Kashmir cricket team. Joshi tasted early success when his Jammu & Kashmir team beat the Ranji giants Mumbai, in the preliminary rounds of 2014–15 Ranji Trophy. Earlier, he had coached his team to the Ranji Trophy Super League Quarter-finals in his debut season as coach from Plate Division.

In December 2015, Joshi was named the spin bowling coach of the Oman cricket team ahead of the 2016 ICC World Twenty20 played in India in March 2016.

In July 2016, Joshi was named as head coach of Assam cricket team next two Ranji Trophy seasons. He replaced his former state teammate Sanath Kumar as the head coach Assam cricket team.

In August 2017, Joshi was named as the spin bowling consultant of Bangladesh cricket team. In July 2019, he was appointed as the spin bowling coach of the United States national cricket team on a short-term basis.

In January 2023, Joshi was appointed as spin bowling coach of Punjab Kings for the 16th edition of the Indian Premier League.

== Cricket administration ==
The Board of Control for Cricket in India (BCCI) on 4 March 2020 announced the appointment of Joshi as the new chief selector of Indian men's cricket team.

== Outside cricket ==
Joshi joined Canara Bank under Sports Quota and is currently serving in the position of Deputy General Manager.
