= Alfred Luseno =

Kenyan cricketer (born 1981)

Personal information
- Full name: Alfred Luseno Sorongo
- Born: 20 December 1981 (age 44); Kakamega, Kenya
- Batting: Right-handed
- Bowling: Right arm medium
- Role: Bowler
- Relatives: Josephat Ababu (brother)

International information
- National side: Kenya (2003-2010)
- ODI debut (cap 26): 6 April 2003 v Sri Lanka
- Last ODI: 10 July 2010 v Canada

Domestic team information
- Years: Team
- Kenya Select
- Nairobi Buffaloes

Career statistics
Competition	ODI	FC	LA
Matches	10	12	13
Runs scored	34	43	42
Batting average	17.00	6.14	21.00
100s/50s	0/0	0/0	0/0
Top score	16*	11	16*
Balls bowled	330	1,260	462
Wickets	9	17	9
Bowling average	35.11	43.94	48.77
5 wickets in innings	0	0	0
10 wickets in match	0	0	0
Best bowling	4/32	3/40	4/32
Catches/stumpings	1/0	2/0	2/0
- Source: Cricinfo, 12 May 2017

Alfred Luseno Sorongo (born December 20, 1981) is a Kenyan cricketer. He is a right-handed batsman and a right-arm medium-pace bowler.

== International career ==
Luseno played at the Under-19 World Cup in 2002 for his Kenyan team, where they reached Plate Group One, and soon received his first One Day International callup, against Sri Lanka in the Cherry Blossom Sharjah Cup 2003. In this game, he scored a duck, batting at number eleven, and unable to stop a Sri Lankan onslaught spearheaded by centurion Kumar Sangakkara.

He played one match during the Inter-Continental Cup of 2004, against Uganda, and also played in a Kenyan tour of Bangladesh in March 2006. In late 2007 he was recalled to the Kenya squad to face Bermuda and Canada in both Intercontinental cup matches and three One Day Internationals, taking career best figures of 4/32 in the third One day match.
