= Cleophas Udoyi =

Kenyan cricketer

Personal information
- Full name: Cleophas Udoyi
- Born: Kenya
- Batting: Unknown
- Bowling: Unknown

Career statistics
Competition	First-class
Matches	1
Runs scored	24
Batting average	24.00
100s/50s	–/–
Top score	23*
Balls bowled	84
Wickets	0
Bowling average	–
5 wickets in innings	–
10 wickets in match	–
Best bowling	–
Catches/stumpings	1/–
- Source: Cricinfo, 19 September 2021

Cleophas Udoyi (date of birth unknown) is a Kenyan former first-class cricketer.

Udoyi made one appearance in first-class cricket for Kenya against the touring Pakistan Starlets at Nairobi in 1986. Opening the batting twice in the match, he ended the Kenyan first innings of 243 all out unbeaten on 23 at number eleven, while in their second innings he was dismissed for a single run from the same batting position by Sajjad Akbar. With the ball, he bowled a total of 14 wicketless overs across the match, conceding 69 runs.
