= Mohammed Sheikh =

English cricketer (born 1973)

Mohammed Sheikh (born 2 July 1973) is an English cricketer. Born in Birmingham, he is a left-handed batsman and a right-arm medium-pace bowler. In his nine years of first-class cricket he has played for Warwickshire and Derbyshire.

As early as 1994, Sheikh was playing for Warwickshire's second XI, and the following year he would move briefly to Worcestershire and Essex's representative second XI teams.

Pigeonholed early on as a limited overs cricketer, he reportedly has a reputation on the cricketing circuit as an accomplished impressionist and comedian. He bats with expert defensive ability and creative attacking strokes. Sheikh played with Warwickshire in their promotion season of 2001, though he would leave in 2003 for another Division Two team, Derbyshire, for whom he has played ever since.
