= Mary Cleophas Garvin =

American mathematician

Sister Mary Cleophas, born Linetta Anna Garvin, (11 December 1899 – 16 January 1990) was an American mathematician.

== Early life ==
Linetta Garvin was born in Vickery, Ohio, one of six children of Odelia Margaret and automobile and meat salesman Austin Edward Garwin.

After graduating from the Notre Dame Academy in Toledo, Ohio in 1917, she joined the Cleveland, Ohio congregation of the Sisters of Notre Dame de Namur in 1918, and took holy vows in 1920 and 1923, with the name Mary Cleophas recalling her brother Cleophus, who died in childhood.

== Education and career ==
With the Sisters of Notre Dame, Mary Cleophas became a high school teacher in Cleveland. During this time, she studied part-time at Fordham University, earning a bachelor's degree there in 1927. She became a full-time student in 1929, and earned her master’s in physics in 1931 and a Ph.D. in mathematics in 1934 from St. Louis University.

On completing her doctorate, she became professor of mathematics and physics and head of the mathematics department at Notre Dame College. She remained there for 50 years, as a professor until retiring in 1975 and as an archivist until 1984.
