= Hugh Wilson (cricketer) =

English cricketer

Personal information
- Full name: Peter Hugh L'Estrange Wilson
- Born: 17 August 1958 (age 68); Guildford, Surrey, England
- Height: 6 ft 5 in (1.96 m)
- Batting: Right-handed
- Bowling: Right-arm fast-medium

Domestic team information
- Years: Team
- 1978–1982: Surrey
- 1979–80: Northern Transvaal
- 1983–1984: Somerset

Career statistics
Competition	FC	List A
Matches	61	58
Runs scored	261	54
Batting average	10.44	5.40
100s/50s	0/0	0/0
Top score	29	18 not out
Balls bowled	6795	2661
Wickets	110	76
Bowling average	30.85	24.75
5 wickets in innings	1	1
10 wickets in match	–	n/a
Best bowling	5/36	5/21
Catches/stumpings	11/0	8/-
- Source: Cricinfo, 17 October 2015

Peter Hugh L'Estrange Wilson (born 17 August 1958) played first-class and List-A cricket for Surrey and Somerset in England and Northern Transvaal in South Africa. He was born in Guildford, Surrey.

Wilson was educated at Ludgrove School. A tall, strongly-built fast bowler and tail-end batsman, early in his career he was close to Test selection, but problems with his action affected his progress. He holds an odd record, in that he was not dismissed until his 18th first-class match, by which time he had batted seven times and scored 29 runs.
