= Simon Dyson (cricketer) =

English cricketer (born 1948)

Simon Dyson (born 14 February 1948) was an English cricketer. He was a right-handed batsman and leg-break bowler who played for Cheshire. He was born in Guildford, Surrey.

Dyson, who played for Cheshire in the Minor Counties Championship and Holt Cup between 1988 and 1989, made a single List A appearance for the team, during the 1989 NatWest Trophy. From the tailend, he scored a duck.
