= Athar Zaidi =

Pakistani cricket umpire (1946–2012)

Personal information
- Born: 12 November 1946; Lahore, Pakistan
- Died: 30 November 2012 (aged 66); Lahore, Pakistan

Umpiring information
- Tests umpired: 8 (1990–2002)
- ODIs umpired: 10 (1984–1999)
- Source: Cricinfo, 1 July 2013

Athar Zaidi (Urdu: اطہر زیدی; 12 November 1946 – 30 November 2012) was a Pakistani cricket umpire. He stood in eight Test matches between 1990 and 2002 and ten ODI games between 1984 and 1999.

== See also ==
- List of Test cricket umpires
- List of One Day International cricket umpires
