= Alfred Njuguna =

Kenyan cricketer and cricket coach

Personal information
- Full name: Alfred Boy Njuguna
- Born: Kenya
- Batting: Unknown

Head coaching information
- Years: Team
- 2005–2008: Kenya

Career statistics
Competition	First-class
Matches	1
Runs scored	21
Batting average	10.50
100s/50s	–/–
Top score	21
Balls bowled	42
Wickets	1
Bowling average	42.00
5 wickets in innings	–
10 wickets in match	–
Best bowling	1/27
Catches/stumpings	–/–
- Source: Cricinfo, 19 September 2021

Alfred Boy Njūgūna is a Kenyan former first-class cricketer and coach of the Kenya national cricket team.

Njūgūna represented Kenya in three editions of the ICC Trophy between 1986 and 1994, playing 17 matches. In the latter ICC Trophy event, Kenya gained qualification to the 1996 World Cup, but Njūgūna was not part of the Kenya squad for their inaugural world cup. He also made one appearance in first-class cricket for Kenya against the touring Pakistan Starlets at Nairobi in 1986. Batting twice in the match, he was dismissed by Sajjad Akbar in the Kenyan first innings without scoring, while in the second innings he was dismissed for 21 runs by the same bowler. With the ball, he took the wicket of Rizwan-uz-Zaman in the Starlets first innings. After his playing career, Njūgūna moved to coaching and was appointed head coach of Kenya by Cricket Kenya in March 2005, replacing Mudassar Nazar. He held the post until 2006. Following his spell as Kenya's coach, he was critical of the way cricket in Kenya was governed, but did praise the actions of the Nairobi Provincial Cricket Association in 2021 for taking action to resolve the internal leadership disputes which had been ongoing in Cricket Kenya for over a decade.
