= Kenya Select =

Kenya Select is a cricket team which took part in the revamped Logan Cup for 2007. It is the only side to have taken part in the tournament from outside Zimbabwe and it is the first time a Kenyan cricket team, which was not the national side, has played first-class cricket.

Captained by Collins Obuya, Kenya Select is for all intents and purposes a 'Kenya A' side and consist mainly of young players. Some of the more established players in the side are Morris Ouma, David Obuya, Tanmay Mishra and Hiren Varaiya.

The team got its first points for the tournament in a draw against Centrals in the 3rd round. Varaiya took a career best 6/68 while Collins Obuya and Alex Obanda scored their maiden first class hundreds.

== Kenya Select full squad ==
- Collins Obuya [capt]
- Morris Ouma
- David Obuya
- Tanmay Mishra
- Malhar Patel
- Hiren Varaiya
- Alex Obanda
- Rakep Patel
- Rajesh Bhudia
- Nehemiah Odhiambo
- Alfred Luseno
- Elijah Otieno
- Prasan Shrinivas
- Sagar Kharia.

1st Reserve: Mansuk Naran
