= Lameck Onyango =

Kenyan cricketer

Personal information
- Full name: Lameck Onyango Ngoche
- Born: 22 September 1973 (age 53); Nairobi, Kenya
- Nickname: Dada
- Batting: Right-handed
- Bowling: Right arm medium
- Role: Bowler
- Relatives: Nehemiah Odhiambo (brother); James Ngoche (brother); Shem Ngoche (brother); Margaret Ngoche (sister)

International information
- National side: Kenya (1996–2014)
- ODI debut (cap 13): 6 March 1996 v Sri Lanka
- Last ODI: 18 October 2009 v Zimbabwe
- T20I debut (cap 8): 1 September 2007 v Bangladesh
- Last T20I: 14 September 2007 v Sri Lanka

Domestic team information
- Years: Team
- Swamibapa Sports Club

Career statistics
Competition	ODI	T20I	FC	LA
Matches	29	5	23	61
Runs scored	144	17	339	286
Batting average	13.09	8.50	13.56	11.44
100s/50s	0/0	0/0	0/1	0/0
Top score	34*	5	67	34*
Balls bowled	995	128	2,489	1,989
Wickets	26	4	35	54
Bowling average	37.73	32.00	42.40	33.24
5 wickets in innings	0	0	2	1
10 wickets in match	0	0	0	0
Best bowling	3/29	2/17	6/21	6/14
Catches/stumpings	3/–	0/–	8/–	8/–
- Source: ESPNcricinfo, 13 May 2017

Lameck Onyango Ngoche (born 22 September 1973) is a Kenyan former cricketer. He is a right-handed batsman and a right-arm medium-pace bowler. Though initially not one of cricket's more successful figures, his career turned around during his second year in 1997, when he switched roles from bowler to a "specialist tail-ender" for the ICC Trophy.

== Career ==
From 2004 Onyango developed into an effective bowling all-rounder and followed up his maiden first-class half century with match winning figures of 6–21 in Kenya's 2005 Intercontinental Trophy victory over Uganda. Later, he worked on his batting and made some handy contributions to the Kenyan batting line up.

After five years, Onyango was recalled in a bizarre fashion - as a number 11 against Australia in 2002, but did not bowl throughout. Though missing Kenya's World Cup campaign of 2003, he was recalled for 2004 ICC Champions Trophy. In November 2019, he was named in Kenya's squad for the Cricket World Cup Challenge League B tournament in Oman.

In April 2022, Cricket Kenya named Onyango as the interim head coach of Kenya's women's national cricket team.
