= Hiren Varaiya =

Kenyan cricketer (born 1984)

Personal information
- Full name: Hiren Ashok Varaiya
- Born: 9 April 1984 (age 42); Nairobi, Kenya
- Nickname: Viru
- Batting: Right-handed
- Bowling: Left-arm wrist spin
- Role: Bowler

International information
- National side: Kenya (2006–2014)
- ODI debut (cap 33): 5 August 2006 v Canada
- Last ODI: 30 January 2014 v Scotland
- T20I debut (cap 11): 1 September 2007 v Bangladesh
- Last T20I: 24 November 2013 v Afghanistan

Domestic team information
- Years: Team
- 2006/07: Kenya Select

Career statistics
Competition	ODI	T20I	FC	LA
Matches	63	25	25	88
Runs scored	252	51	513	378
Batting average	12.00	51.00	15.08	12.19
100s/50s	0/0	0/0	0/0	0/0
Top score	34	18*	44	34
Balls bowled	2,951	464	4,681	3,962
Wickets	68	18	105	89
Bowling average	30.11	25.61	22.14	30.77
5 wickets in innings	0	0	8	0
10 wickets in match	0	0	2	0
Best bowling	4/25	2/10	6/22	4/25
Catches/stumpings	15/–	12/–	12/–	23/–
- Source: Cricinfo, 7 September 2021

Hiren Ashok Varaiya (born 9 April 1984) is a Kenyan cricketer. He is a right-handed batsman and a left-arm leg spinner.

== International career ==
He made his debut for Kenya in an ICC Intercontinental Cup game against Canada at Maple Leaf Cricket Club on 29 July 2006. He has since represented Kenya in 63 One Day Internationals and 25 Twenty20 Internationals.

Early in his career, Varaiya represented Kenya at the Under-19 World Cup in 2002. Domestically, he plays for the Nairobi Gymkhana Club and Cricket Kenya Franchise, The Southern Stars.

In January 2018, he was named in Kenya's squad for the 2018 ICC World Cricket League Division Two tournament.
