= Peter Ongondo =

Kenyan cricketer

Personal information
- Full name: Peter Jimmy Carter Ongondo
- Born: 10 February 1977 (age 49); Nairobi,-Kenya
- Batting: Right-handed
- Bowling: Right arm medium fast
- Role: Bowler

International information
- National side: Kenya
- ODI debut (cap 22): 30 September 1999 v South Africa
- Last ODI: 20 March 2011 v Zimbabwe
- T20I debut (cap 8): 1 September 2007 v Bangladesh
- Last T20I: 4 August 2008 v Scotland

Career statistics
Competition	ODI	T20I	FC	LA
Matches	79	8	36	121
Runs scored	391	28	273	574
Batting average	9.09	4.66	7.58	9.56
100s/50s	0/0	0/0	0/0	0/0
Top score	36	16	37	36
Balls bowled	3,102	156	4,806	4,669
Wickets	78	5	79	119
Bowling average	30.12	35.40	31.31	30.28
5 wickets in innings	1	0	4	2
10 wickets in match	0	0	0	0
Best bowling	5/51	2/18	5/13	5/30
Catches/stumpings	17/0	0/–	16/–	28/–
- Source: Cricinfo, 12 May 2017

Peter Jimmy Carter Ongondo (born 10 February 1977) is a Kenyan former cricketer. He is a right-handed batman and a right-arm medium-fast bowler.

In 2012, Ongondo was appointed for the coaching staff of Kenya team.

== Domestic career ==
In 2008, Ongondo was selected as captain of the team the Western Chiefs in Kenya's newly formed domestic competition the Sahara Elite League.

Ongondo moved to Chesham Cricket Club in England in 2010 and following his excellent performances on the pitch and his incredible work rate off the pitch he returned for another season in 2011. Due to problems in obtaining a visa, Ongondo was unable to return in 2012 but helped to recommend the club's next overseas player, Nehemiah Odhiambo.

== International career ==
Ongondo made his ODI debut for Kenya against South Africa in 1999-2000. He had to wait two years for his next appearance, where he made a commendable 36 as the number 11 batsman against the West Indies. His was the second highest score by a number 11 in ODI cricket at the time. Ongondo was a regular for the Kenya during the 2000s.
