= Rajesh Bhudia =

Kenyan cricketer (born 1984)

Personal information
- Full name: Rajesh Lalji Bhudia
- Born: 22 November 1984 (age 41); Bhuj, Gujarat, India
- Batting: Right-handed
- Bowling: Right-arm medium

International information
- National side: Kenya (2007–2009)
- ODI debut (cap 37): 18 October 2008 v Ireland
- Last ODI: 19 April 2009 v Netherlands
- T20I debut (cap 1): 1 September 2007 v Bangladesh
- Last T20I: 12 September 2007 v New Zealand

Career statistics
| Competition | ODI | T20I | FC | LA |
|---|---|---|---|---|
| Matches | 5 | 3 | 8 | 10 |
| Runs scored | 122 | 20 | 188 | 138 |
| Batting average | 24.40 | 10.00 | 15.66 | 17.25 |
| 100s/50s | 0/0 | 0/0 | 0/1 | 0/0 |
| Top score | 47 | 11* | 56 | 47 |
| Balls bowled | 180 | 44 | 894 | 318 |
| Wickets | 3 | 0 | 10 | 9 |
| Bowling average | 50.33 | – | 45.30 | 27.11 |
| 5 wickets in innings | 0 | – | 0 | 1 |
| 10 wickets in match | 0 | – | 0 | 0 |
| Best bowling | 2/42 | – | 2/45 | 5/21 |
| Catches/stumpings | 2/– | 1/– | 6/– | 3/– |
- Source: Cricinfo, 12 May 2017

Rajesh Bhudia (born 22 November 1984) is a former Kenyan cricketer. He was part of their 15-man squad for the 2007 Cricket World Cup. He did not play any cricket since 2012.
