= David Obuya =

Kenyan cricketer

Personal information
- Full name: David Oluoch Obuya
- Born: 14 August 1979 (age 47); Nairobi, Kenya
- Batting: Right-handed
- Role: Wicket-keeper
- Relatives: Collins Obuya (brother); Kennedy Obuya (brother)

International information
- National side: Kenya (2001–2012)
- ODI debut (cap 24): 15 August 2001 v West Indies
- Last ODI: 20 February 2012 v Ireland
- T20I debut (cap 6): 1 September 2007 v Bangladesh
- Last T20I: 14 March 2012 v Ireland

Domestic team information
- Years: Team
- 2006/07: Kenya Select

Career statistics
Competition	ODI	T20I	FC	LA
Matches	74	10	23	97
Runs scored	1,355	216	1,196	1,883
Batting average	19.35	27.00	29.17	21.15
100s/50s	0/6	0/2	2/6	0/10
Top score	93	65*	105	93
Catches/stumpings	39/5	2/1	32/3	56/14
- Source: ESPNcricinfo, 12 May 2017

David Oluoch Obuya (born 14 August 1979) is a Kenyan former cricketer who played 74 One Day Internationals between 2001 and 2012. He was a right-handed batsman and wicket-keeper.

== International career ==
Obuya first played cricket internationally when selected for the 1998 Under-19 Cricket World Cup where he made five apperarances.

His one-day career was to follow three years later. He first represented the senior team on a tour of the West Indies in 2001, where he played as an opener, alongside Ravindu Shah. He played four matches during the 2003 World Cup in which Kenya reached the semi-final.

His brothers, Kennedy Otieno and Collins Obuya, both played international cricket for Kenya.

Obuya was the first player in history of T20I as well as in ICC World Twenty20 history to be dismissed hit wicket, as he fell for a duck in that innings.

In October 2018, he was named as the head coach of the Kenya national cricket team, ahead of the 2018 ICC World Cricket League Division Three tournament in Oman.
