= Alex Obanda =

Kenyan cricketer

Personal information
- Full name: Alex Auma Obanda
- Born: 25 December 1987 (age 38); Nairobi, Kenya
- Batting: Right-handed
- Bowling: Right arm medium-fast
- Role: Opening Batsman

International information
- National side: Kenya (2007–present)
- ODI debut (cap 34): 18 October 2007 v Canada
- Last ODI: 30 January 2014 v Scotland
- T20I debut (cap 12): 4 September 2007 v Pakistan
- Last T20I: 29 August 2022 v Nepal

Domestic team information
- Years: Team
- 2011/12: Southern Rocks

Career statistics
Competition	ODI	T20I	FC	LA
Matches	49	51	17	100
Runs scored	1,306	797	856	2,436
Batting average	30.37	18.53	26.75	27.06
100s/50s	0/9	1/1	1/4	1/14
Top score	96*	103*	114	100
Catches/stumpings	15/0	7/–	8/–	32/0
- Source: ESPNcricinfo, 5 July 2023

Alex Auma Obanda (born 25 December 1987) is a Kenyan cricketer who has played first-class cricket for Kenya Select.

== Domestic career ==
When the side participated in the Logan Cup in 2007, Obanda made his first class debut and had a good series, making 296 runs at an average of 37 runs per innings. A right-handed batsman, Obanda scored a century in their draw against Centrals at Kwekwe. He was the only Kenyan player to take part in the 2011–12 Stanbic Bank 20 Series, representing the Southern Rocks. He played two matches without scoring a run.

== International career ==
The World Twenty20 Qualifier was held in March 2012. Kenya failed to qualify for the 2012 ICC World Twenty20 later that year, though Obanda scored 298 runs in 9 matches with two half-centuries and was Kenya's leading run-scorer in the tournament (seventh overall).

In January 2018, he was named in Kenya's squad for the 2018 ICC World Cricket League Division Two tournament. In July 2018, Obanda scored the first century of the 2018–19 ICC World Twenty20 Africa Qualifier tournament, when Kenya played Tanzania in the Eastern sub-region group.

In September 2018, Obanda was named in Kenya's squad for the 2018 Africa T20 Cup. He was the leading run-scorer for Kenya in the tournament, with 127 runs in four matches. The following month, he was named in Kenya's squad for the 2018 ICC World Cricket League Division Three tournament in Oman.

Obanda was included in Kenya's squad for the Regional Finals of the 2018–19 ICC T20 World Cup Africa Qualifier tournament in Uganda. In September 2019, he represented Kenya in the 2019 ICC T20 World Cup Qualifier tournament in the United Arab Emirates. In October 2021, he was named in Kenya's squad for the Regional Final of the 2021 ICC Men's T20 World Cup Africa Qualifier tournament in Rwanda.
