= Nehemiah Odhiambo =

Kenyan cricketer

Personal information
- Full name: Nehemiah Odhiambo Ngoche
- Born: 7 August 1983 (age 43); Nairobi, Kenya
- Nickname: Nemi
- Batting: Right-handed
- Bowling: Right arm medium-fast
- Role: Bowler
- Relatives: Lameck Onyango (brother); James Ngoche (brother); Shem Ngoche (brother); Margaret Ngoche (sister)

International information
- National side: Kenya (2006–present)
- ODI debut (cap 31): 25 February 2006 v Zimbabwe
- Last ODI: 30 January 2014 v Scotland
- T20I debut (cap 14): 12 September 2007 v New Zealand
- Last T20I: 21 September 2022 v Uganda

Career statistics
Competition	ODI	T20I	FC	LA
Matches	69	43	22	116
Runs scored	528	284	456	896
Batting average	12.00	10.92	13.41	12.61
100s/50s	0/1	0/0	0/1	0/2
Top score	66	41	50*	66
Balls bowled	2,808	613	3,363	4,708
Wickets	70	30	69	115
Bowling average	36.92	27.73	29.36	36.17
5 wickets in innings	0	1	2	0
10 wickets in match	0	0	0	0
Best bowling	4/61	5/20	5/43	4/54
Catches/stumpings	7/–	10/–	10/–	14/–
- Source: ESPNcricinfo, 8 July 2023

Nehemiah Odhiambo Ngoche (born 7 August 1984) is a Kenyan cricketer. He plays both One Day Internationals and Twenty20 Internationals for Kenya. He is the brother of fellow Kenyan cricketers Lameck Onyango, James Ngoche and Shem Ngoche. Their sister Margaret Ngoche is also a Kenyan cricketer and a former captain of the Kenya women's cricket team.

== International career ==
Known for his fast-medium bowling, Odhiambo was the first player to take a T20I five-wicket haul on the home soil when he did it on 4 February 2010 against Scotland at Nairobi and also became the second bowler to grab a five-wicket haul in T20I history. He was also the first Kenyan to achieve this feat.

Odhiambo was one of three brothers, others being James and Shem, in the Kenyan squad for the World Cup held in Bangladesh, India and Sri Lanka from 19 February to 2 April 2011.

In January 2018, he was named in Kenya's squad for the 2018 ICC World Cricket League Division Two tournament. In September 2018, he was named in Kenya's squad for the 2018 Africa T20 Cup. In November 2019, he was named in Kenya's squad for the Cricket World Cup Challenge League B tournament in Oman. In October 2021, he was named in Kenya's squad for the Regional Final of the 2021 ICC Men's T20 World Cup Africa Qualifier tournament in Rwanda.
