= Kenya national cricket team =

Men's team representing the Republic of Kenya in international cricket

Kenya Cricket Team
- Timu ya kriketi ya Kenya
- Nickname: Simbas
- Association: Cricket Kenya

Personnel
- Captain: Dhiren Gondaria
- Coach: Joseph Angara, Lameck Onyango
- Chairman: Bhavesh Gohil

International Cricket Council
- ICC status: Associate member (1981)
- ICC region: Africa
ICC Rankings	Current	Best-ever
ODI	---	10th (1 May 1998)
T20I	32nd	12th (1 Mar 2007)

International cricket
- First international: 1 December 1951 vs Tanzania at Nairobi

One Day Internationals
- First ODI: v India at the Barabati Stadium, Cuttack; 18 February 1996
- Last ODI: v Scotland at Hagley Oval, Christchurch; 30 January 2014
ODIs	Played	Won/Lost
Total	154	42/107 (0 ties, 5 no results)
- World Cup appearances: 5 (first in 1996)
- Best result: Semi-finals (2003)
- World Cup Qualifier appearances: 7 (first in 1982)
- Best result: Runners-up (1994, 1997)

T20 Internationals
- First T20I: v Bangladesh at Gymkhana Club Ground, Nairobi; 1 September 2007
- Last T20I: v Uganda at Gahanga International Cricket Stadium, Kigali; 19 September 2026
T20Is	Played	Won/Lost
Total	138	79/56 (0 ties, 3 no results)
This year	17	14/3 (0 ties, 0 no results)
- T20 World Cup appearances: 1 (first in 2007)
- Best result: Group stage (2007)
- T20 World Cup Qualifier appearances: 8 (Note: For the 2024 and 2026 Men's T20 World Cups, the final round of qualification in Africa was the ICC Africa Regional Final.) (first in 2008)
- Best result: 3rd place (2025)
List A kit
T20I kit
- As of 19 September 2026

The Kenya men's national cricket team represents the Republic of Kenya in international cricket. Kenya is an associate member of the International Cricket Council (ICC) which has Twenty20 International (T20I) status after the ICC granted T20I status to all its members.

They have been an associate member of the ICC since 1981. Since then they have played in five Cricket World Cups from 1996 to 2011 with their best result being a bronze medal finish as the semi-final appearance at the 2003 Cricket World Cup in Southern Africa. They have only qualified for one ICC World Twenty20 tournament, in 2007. The Kenyan national team is governed by Cricket Kenya.

Kenya gained One Day International (ODI) status in 1996 in preparation for the 1996 Cricket World Cup and would have it for eighteen years before losing it at the 2014 Cricket World Cup Qualifier where they finished in the fifth place. Recently they competed in the African Continental and emerged winners of the 2026 edition, this is their first title since the inauguration of the tournament. Kenya is set to play the qualifiers round for the upcoming 2028 T20 World Cup after being promoted from the sub regional round.

== Current squad ==
This lists all active players who featured for Kenya in the current series held in Jersey. Updated as of 31 August 2025.

Name	Age	Batting style	Bowling style	Notes
Batters
Pushkar Sharma	24	Left-handed	Left-arm medium	
Dhiren Gonderia	30	Right-handed	Right-arm off break	Captain
Sachin Bhudia	31	Right-handed	Right-arm medium	
Jasraj Kundi	26	Right-handed	Right-arm medium	
All-rounders
Nelson Odhiambo	36	Right-handed	Right-arm medium	
Rakep Patel	36	Right-handed	Right-arm off break	
Wicketkeeper
Sukhdeep Singh	24	Right-handed	-	
Spin bowlers
Shem Ngoche	36	Right-handed	Slow left-arm orthodox	
Vraj Patel	23	Left-handed	Slow left-arm orthodox	
Vishil Patel	20	Right-handed	Right-arm leg break	
Pace bowlers
Lucas Oluoch	34	Right-handed	Left-arm medium	Vice-captain
Peter Langat	31	Right-handed	Right-arm medium	
Francis Mutua	23	Right-handed	Right-arm medium	
Tanzeel Sheikh	29	Right-handed	Right-arm medium	

== History ==
=== East Africa team ===
Full article: East Africa cricket team

Kenya, Tanzania and Uganda combined to form the East Africa cricket team, which became an associate member of the ICC in 1966. They continued playing amongst themselves, and were joined by Zambia in a quadrangular tournament played annually between 1966 and 1980.

India toured East Africa in 1967 and played a three-day match against Kenya on 5 August, which was drawn. Various tours of, and by, East Africa continued, including a tour of England in 1972 and a first-class match between East Africa and the MCC at Nairobi Gymkhana Club in 1974 before East Africa took part in the first Cricket World Cup.

The 1975 Cricket World Cup took place in England, and East Africa was one of two non-test teams invited to the tournament, the other being Sri Lanka. Kenya provided half of the fourteen-man squad for the tournament. After warm-up matches against Somerset, Wales, Glamorgan and various club teams, they played in the same first round group as England, India and New Zealand, losing to all three. The World Cup was followed by a first-class match against Sri Lanka at the County Ground, Taunton.

East Africa then took part in the 1979 ICC Trophy, the first ICC Trophy tournament, but did not progress beyond the first round, thus missing out on qualification for the 1979 World Cup.

=== ICC membership ===
Long considered the strongest part of the East African cricket team, Kenya broke away in 1981 and joined the ICC in their own right as an associate member, shortly after a tour of Zimbabwe in 1980/81. They played two three-day matches against Zimbabwe on that tour, losing both. Kenya played in the ICC Trophy in their own right in 1982, 1986, and 1990, also playing their first first-class match against Pakistan B in September 1986.

=== 1996 World Cup ===
The 1994 ICC Trophy was hosted in Nairobi and Kenya finished as runners-up to the UAE, thus qualifying for the 1996 World Cup. Kenya then played at home against India A in August 1995, and went on a tour to South Africa in September/October that year, before playing in the World Cup, which was to bring Kenyan cricket to a much wider audience, and catapult them into the spotlight.

Kenya was in the same group as Australia, India, Sri Lanka, the West Indies and Zimbabwe. They played their very first ODI match against India.

18 February
Scorecard

Kenya; 199/6 (50 overs)	v	India; 203/3 (41.5 overs)
Steve Tikolo 65 (83); Anil Kumble 3/28 (10 overs)		Sachin Tendulkar 127* (138); Steve Tikolo 1/26 (3 overs)

India won by 7 wickets
Barabati Stadium, Cuttack
Umpires: K. T. Francis and David Shepherd
Player of the match: Sachin Tendulkar (Ind)

- Kenya's first ever ODI match

In what at the time was described as the most startling upsets in the history of the World Cup, Kenya bowled out the West Indies for just 93 and won by 73 runs.

29 February
Scorecard

Kenya; 166 (49.3 overs)	v	West Indies; 93 (35.2 overs)
Steve Tikolo 29 (50); Courtney Walsh 3/46 (9 overs)		Shivnarine Chanderpaul 19 (48); Maurice Odumbe 3/15 (10 overs)

Kenya won by 73 runs
Nehru Stadium, Pune
Umpires: Khizer Hayat and V.K. Ramaswamy
Player of the match: Maurice Odumbe (Ken)

The Kenya national team arrived in India for its maiden World Cup, having players like Steve Tikolo, Maurice Odumbe and Thomas Odoyo. The team was expected to be crushed by the full member teams in its group and this proved to be correct in most of their matches. But the highlights of their campaign was beating former World Champions the West Indies in a low-scoring affair.

=== ODI status ===
Following their World Cup performance, Kenya were given full ODI status by the ICC, and hosted a quadrangular tournament against Pakistan, South Africa and Sri Lanka in September/October 1996. The Netherlands toured in December, playing four one-day matches, with the Kenyans winning them all. They played in the quarter finals of South Africa's Standard Bank Cup in March 1997, losing to Natal by 104 runs at Kingsmead. Following this was the 1997 ICC Trophy, hosted in Malaysia. Kenya reached the final, where they lost to Bangladesh by two wickets. This was followed by a tri-series against Bangladesh and Zimbabwe in October the same year in Nairobi.

England A were the first opposition in 1998, touring Kenya in January. The three-day match ended in a draw, while England A won the only one-day match that wasn't abandoned due to the weather. After this was another spot in the quarter final of the Standard Bank Cup, this time losing to Gauteng by 8 wickets. Kenya visited India in May, playing a triangular ODI series against Bangladesh and India. In the final match of the round-robin stage, Kenya pulled off an upset by beating India by 69 runs.

28 May
(Scorecard)

Kenya; 265/5 (50 overs)	v	India; 196 (47.1 overs)
Maurice Odumbe 83 (91); Anil Kumble 2/27 (8 overs)		Rahul Dravid 33 (53); Maurice Odumbe 3/14 (4.1 overs)

Kenya won by 69 runs
Roop Singh Stadium, Gwalior
Umpires: Subrata Banerjee & Rajan Seth
Player of the match: Maurice Odumbe (Kenya)

- Kenya won the toss and elected to bat
- Nikhil Chopra & Jatin Paranjpe made their ODI debuts

Kenya then competed in the cricket tournament at the 1998 Commonwealth Games. Drawn in the same first round group as New Zealand, Pakistan and Scotland, Kenya only beat the Scots, and finished third in the points table for the group.

Kenya warmed up for the 1999 World Cup with a triangular series in Bangladesh against Bangladesh and Zimbabwe. In the 1999 World Cup itself, they were placed in the same first round group as England, India, South Africa, Sri Lanka and Zimbabwe. Following warm-up games against Somerset, Gloucestershire and Glamorgan, they lost all five of their games in the tournament proper. Following the World Cup, they played a quadrangular tournament at home against India, South Africa and Zimbabwe, again losing all their games.

The 21st century started for Kenya with a visit to Zimbabwe to play in the ICC Emerging Nations Tournament against Denmark, Ireland, the Netherlands, Scotland and Zimbabwe A. Kenya won the tournament and took this form onto a seven-match tour of India on which they lost just one game. Pakistan A toured Kenya in July, playing a five match one-day series and a four-day first-class match. The four-day match was drawn, and Kenya won the one-day series 4–1. The 2000 ICC KnockOut Trophy was played in Nairobi in October, with Kenya falling to India at the first hurdle.

The first opponents for Kenya in 2001 were Sri Lanka A, who toured Kenya in January, playing two first-class matches and four one-day matches. Both first-class matches were drawn, and Sri Lanka A won the first two one-day games, with the final two being abandoned. The West Indies came in August for two first-class games and a three-match ODI series. The first first-class game was won by the West Indies, with the second being drawn, and the three ODIs all went the way of the visitors. Kenya then played an ODI triangular tournament in South Africa in October, against India and the hosts, and picked up a second ODI win over India.

17 October
(Scorecard)

Kenya; 246/6 (50 overs)	v	India; 176 (46.4 overs)
Kennedy Otieno 64 (95); Harbhajan Singh 2/38 (10 overs)		Harbhajan Singh 37 (32); Joseph Angara 3/30 (10 overs)

Kenya won by 70 runs
St George's Park, Port Elizabeth
Umpires: Brian Jerling & David Orchard
Player of the match: Kennedy Otieno (Kenya)

- Kenya won the toss and elected to bat

Zimbabwe A toured Kenya towards the end of the year, losing a first-class series 1–0 and a one-day series 3–2. Kenya toured Sri Lanka in early 2002, playing three first-class and three one-day matches against Sri Lanka A. Sri Lanka A won all three of the first-class games, but Kenya won the one-day series 2–1. The MCC toured Kenya shortly after this, playing one three-day match and six one-day matches against the national team. Five of the one-day matches went the way of the Kenyans before the sixth one-day match and the three-day match were abandoned. Kenya then played in the ICC 6 Nations Challenge tournament in Windhoek, Namibia, playing against Canada, Namibia, the Netherlands, Sri Lanka A and Zimbabwe A. Kenya won the tournament, beating Sri Lanka A by 3 wickets in the final. In August/September, Kenya hosted an ODI triangular tournament against Australia and Pakistan, losing all four of their matches. This was followed by a place in the 2002 ICC Champions Trophy, though Kenya lost to the West Indies and South Africa, failing to progress beyond the first round.

Namibia toured Kenya in November, playing four one-day games. Kenya won the series 2–1, with one game being abandoned. Kenya then toured Zimbabwe to round off the year, playing three one-day matches against Zimbabwe A, and a three-match ODI series against the full Zimbabwean team. Zimbabwe won the ODI series 2–0, with one match finishing in a no result, and Zimbabwe A won their series against Kenya 2–1.

=== 2003 World Cup and decline ===
The 2003 Cricket World Cup was to be Kenya's finest moment in international cricket to date. The tournament was held in South Africa, with Kenya hosting their two matches against Sri Lanka and New Zealand. The tournament started with a defeat to South Africa, but Kenya bounced back with a four wicket win over Canada in Cape Town. New Zealand forfeited their match against Kenya in Nairobi due to safety concerns, but Sri Lanka did visit Nairobi and much to their dismay lost by 53 runs as Kenya pulled off another upset victory.

24 February 2003
Scorecard

Kenya; 210/9 (50 overs)	v	Sri Lanka; 157 (45 overs)
KO Otieno 60 (88); M Muralitharan 4/28 (10)		PA de Silva 41 (53); CO Obuya 5/24 (10)

Kenya won by 53 runs
Nairobi Gymkhana Club, Nairobi, Kenya
Umpires: DJ Harper (Aus) and RB Tiffin (Zim)
Player of the match: CO Obuya (Ken)

- Kenya won the toss and elected to bat.

The tournament continued, back in South Africa, with a win over Bangladesh and a defeat to the West Indies. Kenya had done enough to qualify for the Super Six stage, becoming the first non-test nation to progress beyond the first round of the World Cup. In the Super Six stage, they lost to India and Australia, but beat Zimbabwe by seven wickets, qualifying for the semi-final, where they lost to India by 91 runs.

Kenya's World Cup success was rewarded with a spot in a quadrangular tournament at the Sharjah Cricket Association Stadium against Pakistan, Sri Lanka and Zimbabwe, but they lost all three of their games.

Kenya's failure in the above tournament is perhaps indicative of how they failed to capitalise on their World Cup success, though it must be said that not all of that failure was on the field. Although Kenya were given plenty of matches against national A teams, and played in the Carib Beer Cup in the West Indies in 2004, Kenya only played two ODIs in the three years after the Sharjah tournament, against India and Pakistan in the 2004 ICC Champions Trophy.

Off-field setbacks also occurred. Maurice Odumbe was banned for match-fixing in August 2004, and a series of strikes by players led to a weakened Kenyan team being eliminated from the inaugural ICC Intercontinental Cup at the semi-final stage by Scotland. By the end of the dispute in 2005, Kenyan cricket had no sponsors and was in virtual international isolation. At that stage the governing body had dissolved internally and Kenyan cricket opportunities were limited and international cricket for them had virtually ceased.

=== Rebuilding ===
==== 2005 to 2007 ====
A rebuilding process began in 2005. The player strikes ceased, and Kenya again reached the semi-finals of the Intercontinental Cup. They warmed up for the semi-finals in Windhoek with a tour of Zimbabwe, to play two first-class and one one-day match against Zimbabwe A. They won all three of those games, and drew against Bermuda in the semi-final of the 2005 ICC Intercontinental Cup but lost to Ireland in the final, despite scoring 404/4 in their first innings.

In early 2006, the Kenya Cricket Association was disbanded and replaced by Cricket Kenya. The rebuilding process was in full swing as Kenya began playing ODI cricket again. Their return to ODI cricket was a five match series against Zimbabwe, which was drawn 2–2 with one match abandoned. This was followed by a four match ODI series against Bangladesh, with Kenya losing all four matches in that series. Their 2006 ICC Intercontinental Cup campaign got off to a poor start with a draw against the Netherlands and a defeat to Canada, but they bounced right back with two ODI wins over Canada at the Toronto Cricket, Skating and Curling Club. Bangladesh toured Kenya in August, winning all three ODIs, before an Intercontinental Cup draw against Bermuda and three ODI wins over Bermuda.

A triangular tournament in Mombasa against Canada and Scotland began Kenya's 2007 and Kenya won the tournament. They then hosted Division One of the World Cricket League at three grounds in Nairobi, playing against Bermuda, Canada, Ireland, the Netherlands and Scotland. Kenya also won this event, beating Scotland in the final. This was followed by the 2007 World Cup, Kenya's fourth World Cup. Kenya beat Canada in the first round, but lost to England and New Zealand, thus missing out on the Super Eight stage.

1 September 2007
14:00
Scorecard

Kenya; 138/7 (20 overs)	v	Bangladesh; 139/5 (17.4 overs)
Tanmay Mishra 38 (41); Abdur Razzak 2/22 (4 overs)		Nazimuddin 43 (37); Peter Ongondo 2/21 (4 overs)

Bangladesh won by 5 wickets
Gymkhana Club Ground, Nairobi
Umpires: Rockie D'Mello (Ken) and Subhash Modi (Ken)
Player of the match: Nazimuddin (Ban)

- Bangladesh won the toss and elected to field.
- First ever T20I match for Kenya
- Tamim Iqbal, Alok Kapali, Mahmudullah, Nazimuddin, Syed Rasel (Ban), Rajesh Bhudia, Jadavji Jesani, Jimmy Kamande, Tanmay Mishra, Collins Obuya, David Obuya, Thomas Odoyo, Peter Ongondo, Lameck Onyango, Steve Tikolo and Hiren Varaiya (Ken) all made their T20I debuts.

In October 2007, either team of Intercontinental Cup games, Kenya hosted Canada in two ODIs and then Bermuda in three. Kenya won all five matches, with strong bowling performances setting up relatively comfortable chases batting second.

==== 2008 to 2011 ====
In August 2008, after a break of nine months without a One Day or Twenty20 International, Kenya toured Ireland, Scotland and the Netherlands for various series. It proved a disappointing tour overall, with rain and poor Kenyan batting performances being the main themes.

Kenya initially participated in the 2009 ICC World Twenty20 Qualifier in Belfast, Northern Ireland, the associate qualification tournament for the 2009 ICC World Twenty20. One of the favourites at the start of the tournament, they finished second in Group B with a loss to the Netherlands and a win over Canada, but losses to Ireland and Scotland in the knock-out stages meant that they finished fourth and thus failed to qualify for the World Twenty20.

Kenya then participated in three ODI series across Europe, but these merely resulted in two wash-outs against Scotland, defeat in a rain-affected one-off match to the Netherlands, and losing a three-match series against Ireland 1–0 with two matches affected by rain.

In October 2008, Kenya hosted Ireland and Zimbabwe in an ODI series in Nairobi, but after a loss to Ireland and a win over Zimbabwe, their last three matches were all abandoned due to rain. After this washed-out series, Kenya then travelled to South Africa for two ODIs, losing heavily in both.

In late January and early February 2009, Kenya played five ODIs at home against Zimbabwe, but lost all of them.

Since the World Cup, a team known as Kenya Select has taken part in Zimbabwe's Logan Cup competition, but did not win a game, also losing to Zimbabwe A.

In their opening match of World Cup 2011 campaign, Kenya faced a mammoth defeat from New Zealand by 10 wickets, they were bowled out for 69 runs and New Zealand won the match in just 8 overs without the loss of a wicket.

In 2011, Kenya was whitewashed by the Netherlands national cricket team in a short 2 match ODI series played in Sportspark Westvielt, Voorburg. During this series, Kenya's weak batting was noted. They made only 208/8 in the first match and an even smaller 184/8 in the second match. Seren Waters and Collins Obuya (the national team captain) did, however, have notable performances – the former making 71 in the first match and the latter scoring 54 in the second match.

==== Reforms in 2011 ====
For years, the Kenyan players had been the Associate nations' most pampered professionals. The first time Cricket Kenya's notice was attracted was when during the 2011 ODI World Cup, there were reports of internal dissent between the team, as the team had a disastrous World Cup, losing all six of their games. Cricket Kenya announced that it would review the World Cup debacle after the tournament was over. This was the beginning of a series of reforms initiated by the board.

Following the reviews, the board replaced the former Sahara Elite League with the East African tournaments. While the East Africa Premier League is a Twenty20 tournament, the East African Cup is a 50-over tournament. It is currently hoped that this tournaments will produce further new young talents for Kenya in the future. Within months, the East African tournaments were regarded in high esteem and the intensity was up to the brink, as an Cricinfo interview with Cricket Kenya CEO Tom Sears revealed.

Another important reform brought in by the board was to dump the old guard. As described by Cricinfo journalist Martin Williamson, the old guard was not committed to performance and was more keen to selfish gains. The new contracts had completely cut ties with the past, with Collins Obuya, the new captain, being the oldest player at 29. Experienced players like the former captain Jimmy Kamande, a veteran of five World Cups, Thomas Odoyo, and others were not even considered. As was expected, the left-out players were quick to retort as Kamande said that "the board was selecting players who would be their puppets", while Odoyo opined that "it was malicious and not done in good faith". According to them, it was fast-tracking the death of Kenyan cricket. They were also supported by the Kenyan media.

Among the 20 cricketers offered contracts, 13 of them were offered central contracts. To complicate things further, five players turned down those contracts: Alex Obanda, Shem Ngoche, James Ngoche, Nehemiah Odhiambo, and Elijah Otieno. Sears said that they were pleased with the group of seven players who committed to Cricket Kenya, while equally disappointed with those who refused contracts. Accordingly, they were left out of the squad to face the UAE in the ICC Intercontinental Cup.

Cricket Kenya offered contracts to more young players, such as opening batsman Runish Gudhka from Nairobi, the Australian-born all-rounder Duncan Allan, wicketkeeper Irfan Karim, and fast bowlers such as Emmanuel Ringera, Ibrahim Akello, and Dominic Wesonga, who had performed well in the regional NPCA and East African leagues.

However, the eight players who had refused the contracts offered by the board, with former skipper Morris Ouma, Alfred Luseno and Nelson Odhiambo being late inclusions, asked their views to be heard, and despite the board granting them another chance, they finally took a firm stance against them. While Obanda, Shem and James Ngoche, Odhiambo, and Otieno were made renewed offers, while Ouma, Luseno, and Nelson had a three-month agreement till March 2012 subject to performance. If they could do something good, they could retain their spot in the team. Sears said of this debacle,"It's a shame that yet again some of these players have turned down their contracts but that is their choice. We met with these players as we promised we would, we listened to their views and made them offers that reflected what they wanted – an agreement that would run until the end of the contract year in May 2012 if they met certain performance criteria which all players have to meet. Perhaps the most disappointing aspect was that they refused to represent their teams in the East African Competitions last weekend pulling out at the very last minute. Again sadly it calls into question the professionalism of these players, how committed they are to putting in the effort, their application in fulfilling their potential and the advice they have been getting from their advisors."

Another reform was to appoint the former Otago coach Mike Hesson as the national coach. Immediately afterwards, Hesson announced that he was here to resolve and put to end the dispute between the players and the board. He said that in an interview to the newspaper Otago Daily Times.

The East Africa finals were rescheduled from October to December 2011 due to heavy showers in Nairobi at that time. However, once again, heavy showers in December led the finals again being postponed to January 2012.

=== Loss of ODI status: 2014–2023 ===
Pushkar Sharma made his debut for the national cricket team of Kenya in the 2020s.

Kenya lost their ODI status after 18 years when they finished outside the top 4 in the 2014 Cricket World Cup Qualifier also failing to qualify for the 2015 Cricket World Cup.

Further failures in the World Cricket League, including a defeat to the USA, meant that Kenya couldn't regain their ODI status while being subsequently relegated to the new Challenge League.

In April 2018, the ICC decided to grant full Twenty20 International (T20I) status to all its members. Therefore, all Twenty20 cricket matches played between Kenya and other ICC members since 1 January 2019 have been full T20I matches.

=== Recent developments ===
The Kenyan cricket team reached the final stage of the Africa Qualifier for the 2024 Men's T20 World Cup but narrowly missed out on qualification. In an effort to strengthen their performance and strategy, Cricket Kenya appointed former Indian cricketer Dodda Ganesh as the new head coach, bringing in his extensive experience to guide the team in future competitions.

From October 19 to 24, 2024, Cricket Kenya hosted the T20 World Cup Africa Sub-Regional Qualifier B in Nairobi. Kenya delivered a strong performance throughout the Sub-Regional Qualifier, securing victories that saw them advance alongside Zimbabwe to the regional final. The qualification brought them one step closer to securing a place in the 2026 Men's T20 World Cup. However, Kenya once again failed to progress from the regional final.

== International grounds ==
Locations of all stadiums which have hosted an international cricket match within Kenya

== Tournament history ==
Legend

- Champions
- Runners-up
- Third place/Semi-finals
- Hosts
- Q Qualified/Advanced to next stage
- DNQ Did not qualify
- ▲ Promoted
- Remained in the same division
- ▼ Relegated

=== Cricket World Cup ===
Cricket World Cup record								Qualification record				
Year	Round	Position	Pld	W	L	T	NR	Pld	W	L	T	NR
(England) 1975	Part of East Africa							Part of East Africa				
(England) 1979	Part of East Africa							Part of East Africa				
(England) (Wales) 1983	Did not qualify							7	3	2	0	2
(India) (Pakistan) 1987	Did not qualify							6	3	3	0	0
(Australia) (New Zealand) 1992	Did not qualify							7	2	5	0	0
(India) (Pakistan) (Sri Lanka) 1996	Group stage	10/12	5	1	4	0	0	9	8	1	0	0
(England) (Wales) (Scotland) (Republic of Ireland) (Netherlands) 1999	Group stage	11/12	5	0	5	0	0	10	8	1	0	1
(South Africa) (Zimbabwe) (Kenya) 2003	Semi-finals	3/14	10	5	5	0	0	Qualified due to ODI status				
(Cricket West Indies) 2007	Group stage	11/16	3	1	2	0	0	Qualified due to ODI status				
(India) (Sri Lanka) (Bangladesh) 2011	Group stage	14/14	6	0	6	0	0	13	8	5	0	0
(Australia) (New Zealand) 2015	Did not qualify							29	8	21	0	0
(England) (Wales) 2019	Did not qualify							20	9	11	0	0
(India) 2023	Did not qualify							15	7	7	0	1
(South Africa) (Zimbabwe) (Namibia) 2027	Did not qualify							15	4	9	0	2
Total	0 Titles	5/14	29	7	22	0	0	131	60	65	0	6

=== Cricket World Cup Qualifier ===
Cricket World Cup Qualifier record
Year	Round	Position	Pld	W	L	T	NR	Qual.
(England) 1979	Part of East Africa							
(England) 1982	Group stage	7/16	7	3	2	0	2	DNQ
(England) 1986	Group stage	9/16	6	3	3	0	0	DNQ
(Netherlands) 1990	Semi-finals	4/17	7	2	5	0	0	DNQ
(Kenya) 1994	Runners-up	2/20	9	8	1	0	0	Q
(Malaysia) 1997	Runners-up	2/22	10	8	1	0	1	Q
(Namibia) 2001	Qualified directly due to ODI status							
(Ireland) 2005	Qualified directly due to ODI status							
(South Africa) 2009	Fourth place	4/12	13	8	5	0	0	Q
(New Zealand) 2014	Super Six	5/10	9	3	6	0	0	DNQ
(Zimbabwe) 2018	Did not qualify							
(Zimbabwe) 2023	Did not qualify							
(To be determined) 2027	Did not qualify							
Total	0 Titles	7/13	61	35	23	0	3	—N/a

=== Men's T20 World Cup ===
Men's T20 World Cup record								Qualification record				
Year	Round	Position	Pld	W	L	T	NR	Pld	W	L	T	NR
(South Africa) 2007	Group stage	12/12	2	0	2	0	0	6	5	1	0	0
(England) 2009	Did not qualify							5	1	4	0	0
(Cricket West Indies) 2010	Did not qualify							3	1	2	0	0
(Sri Lanka) 2012	Did not qualify							18	8	10	0	0
(Bangladesh) 2014	Did not qualify							16	11	5	0	0
(India) 2016	Did not qualify							11	7	3	0	1
(United Arab Emirates) (Oman) 2021	Did not qualify							17	10	5	0	2
(Australia) 2022	Did not qualify							6	4	2	0	0
(United States) (Cricket West Indies) 2024	Did not qualify							13	8	3	0	2
(India) (Sri Lanka) 2026	Did not qualify							10	6	4	0	0
(Australia) (New Zealand) 2028	To be determined							6*	5	1	0	0
Total	0 Titles	1/10	2	0	2	0	0	111	66	40	0	5

=== T20 World Cup Global Qualifier ===
Men's T20 World Cup Global Qualifier record
Year	Round	Position	Pld	W	L	T	NR	Qual.
(Ireland) 2008	Fourth place	4/6	5	1	4	0	0	DNQ
(United Arab Emirates) 2010	Group stage	5/8	3	1	2	0	0	DNQ
(United Arab Emirates) 2012	Play-offs	9/16	9	5	4	0	0	DNQ
(United Arab Emirates) 2013	Play-offs	11/16	8	4	4	0	0	DNQ
(Ireland) (Scotland) 2015	Group stage	9/14	6	3	2	0	1	DNQ
(United Arab Emirates) 2019	Group stage	11/14	6	2	4	0	0	DNQ
(Oman) 2022	Did not qualify							
(To be determined) 2028	To be determined							
Total	0 Titles	6/8	37	16	20	0	1	—N/a

=== Champions Trophy ===
Champions Trophy record
Year	Round	Position	Pld	W	L	T	NR
(Bangladesh) 1998	Did not qualify						
(Kenya) 2000	Pre-quarterfinals	11/11	1	0	1	0	0
(Sri Lanka) 2002	Group stage	10/12	2	0	2	0	0
(England) 2004	Group stage	10/12	2	0	2	0	0
(India) 2006	Did not qualify						
(South Africa) 2009	Did not qualify						
(England) (Wales) 2013	Did not qualify						
(England) (Wales) 2017	Did not qualify						
(Pakistan) (United Arab Emirates) 2025	Did not qualify						
Total	0 Titles	3/9	5	0	5	0	0

=== Commonwealth Games ===
Commonwealth Games record
Year	Round	Position	Pld	W	L	T	NR
(Malaysia) 1998	Group stage	11/16	3	1	2	0	0
Total	0 Titles	1/1	3	1	2	0	0

=== African Games ===
African Games record
Year	Round	Position	Pld	W	L	T	NR
(Ghana) 2023	Semi-finals	4/8	5	2	3	0	0
Total	0 Titles	1/1	5	2	3	0	0

=== Other global tournaments ===
CWC Challenge League (List A)	ICC Intercontinental Cup (FC)	World Cricket League (LA/OD/ODI)	Six Nations Challenge (List A)
2019–22 (B): 4th place; 2024–26 (A): 6th place (▼)	2004 : Semi-finals; 2005 : Runners; 2006–07 : Group stage; 2007–08 : 3rd place; 2009–10 : 5th place; 2011–13 : 7th place; 2015–17 : Did not qualify	2007 (Division One) : Winners; 2010 (Division One) : 6th place; 2011–13 WCLC : 6th place (▼); 2015 (Division Two) : 3rd place (▲); 2015–17 WCLC : 5th place (▼); 2018 (Division Two) : 6th place (▼); 2018 (Division Three) : 4th place	2000 : Winners; 2002 : Winners; 2004 : Did not participate

=== Other regional tournaments ===
T20WC Africa Regional Final (T20I)	T20WC Africa Sub-regional Qualifiers (T20I)	ACA Africa T20 Cup (T20I)	Continent Cup T20 Africa (T20I)
2019 : Runners-up (Q); 2021 : Runners-up (DNQ); 2023 : 4th place (DNQ); 2025 : 3rd place (DNQ)	2018: Winners (Q); 2021: Did not participate; 2022: Winners (Q); 2024: Runners-up (Q); 2026: Runners-up (Q)	2022 : 4th place; 2023 : Runners-up	2023 : Runners-up; 2024 : Did not participate; 2026 : Winners

== Coaching history ==
- 1990–1996: (India) Hanumant Singh
- 1996–2003: (India) Sandeep Patil
- 2003–2004: (England) Andy Moles
- 2004–2005: (Pakistan) Mudassar Nazar
- 2005–2006: (Kenya) Alfred Njuguna (interim)
- 2006–2007: (Guyana) Roger Harper
- 2007–2008: (Kenya) Alfred Njuguna (interim)
- 2008–2009: (South Africa) Andy Kirsten
- 2009–2011: (Antigua and Barbuda) Eldine Baptiste
- 2011–2012: (New Zealand) Mike Hesson
- 2012–2013: (Zimbabwe) Robin Brown
- 2013–2014: (Kenya) Steve Tikolo
- 2015–2018: (Kenya) Thomas Odoyo
- 2018–2021: (Kenya) Maurice Odumbe
- 2021–2023: (Kenya) David Obuya
- 2023 -2024: (India) Dodda Ganesh
- 2023–present: (Kenya) Joseph Angara (Assistant Coach)
- 2023–present: (Kenya) Lameck Onyango (Head coach)

== Records ==
International match summary – Kenya

Last updated 19 September 2026

Playing record
Format	M	W	L	T	NR	Inaugural match
One Day Internationals	154	42	107	0	5	18 February 1996
Twenty20 Internationals	138	79	56	0	3	1 September 2007

=== One Day Internationals ===
- Highest team total: 347/3 v Bangladesh, 10 October 1997 at Gymkhana Club Ground, Nairobi
- Highest individual score: 144, Kennedy Otieno v Bangladesh, 10 October 1997 at Gymkhana Club Ground, Nairobi
- Best individual bowling figures: 5/24, Collins Obuya v Sri Lanka, 24 February 2003 at Gymkhana Club Ground, Nairobi

Most ODI runs for Kenya

Player	Runs	Average	Career span
Steve Tikolo	3369	29.55	1996–2014
Thomas Odoyo	2366	23.19	1996–2014
Collins Obuya	2044	25.55	2001–2014
Kennedy Otieno	2016	23.44	1996–2009
Ravindu Shah	1506	27.88	1998–2007

Most ODI wickets for Kenya

Player	Wickets	Average	Career span
Thomas Odoyo	141	29.63	1996–2014
Steve Tikolo	93	33.40	1996–2014
Peter Ongondo	75	30.86	1999–2011
Nehemiah Odhiambo	70	36.92	2006–2014
Hiren Varaiya	68	30.11	2006–2014

Highest individual innings in ODI

Player	Score	Opposition	Venue	Year
Kennedy Otieno	144	Bangladesh	Nairobi (Gymkhana)	1997
Dipak Chudasama	122	Bangladesh	Nairobi (Gymkhana)	1997
Kennedy Otieno	120	Bangladesh	Dhaka	1999
Ravindu Shah	113	Scotland	Mombasa	2007
Irfan Karim	106	Canada	Dubai	2013

Best bowling figures in an innings in ODI

Player	Score	Opposition	Venue	Year
Collins Obuya	5/24	Sri Lanka	Nairobi (Gymkhana)	2003
Aasif Karim	5/33	Bangladesh	Nairobi (Gymkhana)	1997
Peter Ongondo	5/51	Canada	Nairobi (Jaffery)	2018
Peter Ongondo	4/14	Zimbabwe	Harare	2006
Martin Suji	4/24	Bangladesh	Nairobi (Aga Khan)	1997

ODI record versus other nations

Records complete to ODI #3529. Last updated 3 October 2014.

Opponent	M	W	L	T	NR	First match	First win
vs Test nations
Afghanistan	6	2	4	0	0	5 July 2010	7 October 2010
Australia	5	0	5	0	0	23 February 1996	
Bangladesh	14	6	8	0	0	10 October 1997	10 October 1997
England	2	0	2	0	0	18 May 1999	
India	13	2	11	0	0	18 February 1996	28 May 1998
Ireland	10	2	7	0	1	2 February 2007	2 February 2007
New Zealand	2	0	2	0	0	21 February 2003	
Pakistan	6	0	6	0	0	2 October 1996	
South Africa	10	0	10	0	0	3 October 1996	
Sri Lanka	6	1	5	0	0	6 March 1996	24 February 2003
West Indies	6	1	5	0	0	29 February 1996	29 February 1996
Zimbabwe	32	5	25	0	2	26 February 1996	12 March 2003
vs Associate members
Bermuda	8	8	0	0	0	11 November 2006	11 November 2006
Canada	15	9	5	0	1	15 February 2003	15 February 2003
Netherlands	10	3	7	0	0	31 January 2007	31 January 2007
Scotland	9	3	5	0	1	17 January 2007	17 January 2007

=== Twenty20 Internationals ===
- Highest team total: 237/5 v Lesotho, 21 November 2022 at IPRC Cricket Ground, Kigali
- Highest individual score: 120, Rakep Patel v Mozambique, 19 October 2024 at Ruaraka Sports Club Ground, Nairobi
- Best individual bowling figures: 7/7, Sachin Gill v Cameroon, 28 May 2026 at Botswana Cricket Association Oval 1, Gaborone

Most T20I runs for Kenya

Player	Runs	Average	Career span
Rakep Patel	2,228	30.10	2008–2026
Collins Obuya	1,742	30.03	2007–2024
Irfan Karim	1,434	36.76	2013–2026
Rushab Patel	1,226	23.57	2019–2026
Dhiren Gondaria	1,057	34.09	2013–2026

Most T20I wickets for Kenya

Player	Wickets	Average	Career span
Shem Ngoche	136	16.94	2010–2026
Vraj Patel	86	14.15	2021–2025
Lucas Oluoch	85	19.52	2013–2026
Peter Langat	51	20.76	2021–2026
Sachin Gill	46	13.65	2024–2026

T20I record versus other nations

Opponent	M	W	L	T	NR	First match	First win
vs Test nations
Afghanistan	3	1	2	0	0	30 September 2013	11 October 2013
Bangladesh	1	0	1	0	0	1 September 2007	
Ireland	5	0	5	0	0	4 August 2008	
New Zealand	1	0	1	0	0	12 September 2007	
Pakistan	1	0	1	0	0	4 September 2007	
Sri Lanka	1	0	1	0	0	14 September 2007	
Zimbabwe	3	0	3	0	0	30 November 2023	
vs Associate Members
Bahrain	2	1	1	0	0	31 July 2026	1 August 2026
Bermuda	1	1	0	0	0	21 October 2019	21 October 2019
Botswana	8	7	1	0	0	24 November 2022	24 November 2022
Cameroon	3	3	0	0	0	19 September 2022	19 September 2022
Canada	5	4	1	0	0	3 August 2008	3 August 2008
Gambia	1	1	0	0	0	22 October 2024	22 October 2024
Ghana	3	3	0	0	0	21 May 2019	21 May 2019
Ivory Coast	1	1	0	0	0	30 May 2026	30 May 2026
Lesotho	1	1	0	0	0	21 November 2022	21 November 2022
Malawi	6	4	1	0	1	16 September 2022	16 September 2022
Mali	3	3	0	0	0	20 November 2022	20 November 2022
Mozambique	1	1	0	0	0	19 October 2024	19 October 2024
Namibia	3	0	3	0	0	25 October 2019	
Nepal	5	2	3	0	0	25 August 2022	26 August 2022
Netherlands	6	2	4	0	0	2 August 2008	19 April 2013
Nigeria	15	12	3	0	0	20 May 2019	20 May 2019
Papua New Guinea	1	0	1	0	0	27 October 2019	
Rwanda	12	11	1	0	0	20 November 2022	20 November 2022
Saint Helena	1	0	0	0	1	17 November 2022	
Scotland	8	3	5	0	0	4 August 2008	1 February 2010
Seychelles	3	3	0	0	0	25 November 2022	25 November 2022
Sierra Leone	5	5	0	0	0	7 December 2023	7 December 2023
Singapore	1	1	0	0	0	23 October 2019	23 October 2019
Tanzania	5	3	2	0	0	17 November 2021	18 November 2021
Uganda	21	6	14	0	1	22 May 2019	22 May 2019
United Arab Emirates	2	0	2	0	0	18 July 2025	

Records complete to T20I #4133. Last updated 19 September 2026.

== Notes ==
^† Excluding appearances in the 1975 Cricket World Cup and the 1979 ICC Trophy as part of East Africa.

== See also ==
- Kenyan women's cricket team
- Cricket Kenya
- National Elite League Twenty20
- List of Kenyan ODI cricketers
- List of Kenyan Twenty20 International cricketers
- List of Kenyan first-class cricketers
- Kenyan national cricket captains
- Cricket in Kenya
