= 2003 Cricket World Cup squads =

This is a list of squads named for the seventh edition of Cricket World Cup (2003 Cricket World Cup), held in South Africa, Zimbabwe and Kenya between 9 February and 23 March 2003. The tournament saw 14 teams selected and placed in two groups. Each country was required to submit a final list of 15 players by 31 December 2002. An injured player could be replaced at any time up until the end of the tournament. Replacement players who were not in the original 15-man squad are indicated in italics. The oldest player at the 2003 Cricket World Cup was Lennie Louw (43) of Namibia while the youngest was Talha Jubair (17) of Bangladesh.

== Group A ==
=== Australia ===
Australia announced its squad for the 2003 World Cup on 31 December 2002. Australia made three replacements in the squad – Ian Harvey replacing Shane Watson on 25 January 2003, Nathan Hauritz replacing Shane Warne on 24 February 2003, and Nathan Bracken replacing Jason Gillespie on 5 March 2003.
Coach: John Buchanan

No.	Name	Date of birth	Batting	Bowling	ODIs	Domestic team
14	Ricky Ponting (c)	19 December 1974	RHB	Right arm medium	157	Tasmania
12	Michael Bevan	8 May 1970	LHB	Slow left-arm wrist-spin	196	New South Wales
34	Andy Bichel	27 August 1970	RHB	Right arm fast medium	38	Queensland
59	Nathan Bracken	12 September 1977	RHB	left arm fast medium	11	New South Wales
18	Adam Gilchrist (wk)	14 November 1971	LHB	off spin	152	Western Australia
4	Jason Gillespie	19 April 1975	RHB	Right arm fast	46	South Australia
29	Ian Harvey	10 April 1972	RHB	Right arm medium	43	Victoria
43	Nathan Hauritz	18 October 1981	RHB	Right arm off spin	5	Queensland
30	Matthew Hayden	29 October 1971	LHB	Right arm medium	54	Queensland
31	Brad Hogg	6 February 1971	LHB	Slow left-arm wrist-spin	15	Western Australia
58	Brett Lee	8 November 1976	RHB	Right arm fast	55	New South Wales
25	Darren Lehmann	5 February 1970	LHB	Slow left arm orthodox	85	South Australia
46	Jimmy Maher	27 February 1974	LHB	Right arm medium	19	Queensland
30	Damien Martyn	21 October 1971	RHB	Right arm medium	113	Western Australia
11	Glenn McGrath	9 February 1970	RHB	Right arm fast medium	168	New South Wales
39	Andrew Symonds	9 June 1975	RHB	Right arm fast medium/off-spin	54	Queensland

=== England ===
The English squad for the 2003 Cricket World Cup was announced on 31 December 2002.
Coach: Duncan Fletcher

No.	Name	Date of birth	Batting	Bowling style	ODIs	Domestic team
3	Nasser Hussain (c)	28 March 1968	RHB	Right arm leg spin	84	(England) Essex
40	James Anderson	30 July 1982	LHB	Right arm fast medium	9	(England) Lancashire
37	Ian Blackwell	10 June 1978	LHB	Slow left arm orthodox	12	(England) Somerset
2	Andy Caddick	21 November 1968	RHB	Right arm fast medium	49	(England) Somerset
50	Paul Collingwood	26 May 1976	RHB	Right arm fast medium	33	(England) Durham
11	Andrew Flintoff	6 December 1977	RHB	Right arm fast	47	(England) Lancashire
29	Ashley Giles	19 March 1973	RHB	Slow left arm orthodox	22	(England) Warwickshire
28	Steve Harmison	23 October 1978	RHB	Right arm fast	5	(England) Durham
22	Matthew Hoggard	31 December 1976	RHB	Right arm fast medium	20	(England) Yorkshire
15	Ronnie Irani	26 October 1971	RHB	Right arm medium	29	(England) Essex
1	Nick Knight	28 November 1969	LHB	Right arm medium	95	(England) Warwickshire
4	Alec Stewart (wk)	8 April 1963	RHB	Right arm medium	165	(England) Surrey
23	Marcus Trescothick	25 December 1975	LHB	Right arm medium	56	(England) Somerset
99	Michael Vaughan	29 October 1974	RHB	Right arm off spin	21	(England) Yorkshire
6	Craig White	16 December 1969	RHB	Right arm fast medium	46	(England) Yorkshire

=== India ===
The India squad for the tournament was announced on 30 December 2002.
Coach: John Wright

No.	Name	Date of birth	Batting	Bowling style	ODIs	Domestic team
99	Sourav Ganguly (c)	8 July 1972	LHB	Right arm medium	218	(India) Bengal
5	Rahul Dravid (wk) (vc)	11 January 1973	RHB	Right arm off spin	196	(India) Karnataka
44	Virender Sehwag	20 October 1978	RHB	Right arm off spin	57	(India) Delhi
10	Sachin Tendulkar	24 April 1973	RHB	Right arm leg spin	303	(India) Mumbai
12	Yuvraj Singh	12 December 1981	LHB	Slow left arm orthodox	59	(India) Punjab
11	Mohammad Kaif	1 December 1980	RHB	Right arm off spin	37	(India) Uttar Pradesh
3	Harbhajan Singh	3 July 1980	RHB	Right arm off spin	63	(India) Punjab
7	Javagal Srinath	31 August 1969	RHB	Right arm fast medium	229	(India) Karnataka
34	Zaheer Khan	7 October 1978	RHB	Left arm fast medium	56	(India) Baroda
8	Anil Kumble	17 October 1970	RHB	Right arm leg spin	238	(India) Karnataka
20	Parthiv Patel (wk)	9 March 1985	LHB	WK	13	(India) Gujarat
28	Dinesh Mongia	17 April 1977	LHB	Slow left arm orthodox	32	(India) Punjab
66	Sanjay Bangar	11 October 1972	RHB	Right arm medium fast	11	(India) Railways
64	Ashish Nehra	29 April 1979	RHB	Left arm fast medium	30	(India) Delhi
9	Ajit Agarkar	4 December 1977	RHB	Right arm fast medium	110	(India) Mumbai

- Indian Cricket Team Captain Sourav Ganguly Shirt no. changed 99 to 24 on 18 February 2003

=== Namibia ===
Coach: Dougie Brown

No.	Name	Date of birth	Batting	Bowling style	ODIs	Domestic team
12	Deon Kotze (c)	12 September 1973	RHB	Right arm off spin	0	(Namibia) Wanderers
5	Jan-Berrie Burger	25 August 1981	RHB	Right arm leg spin	0	(Namibia) Police
14	Louis Burger	12 March 1978	RHB	Right arm medium	0	(Namibia) United
2	Sarel Burger	13 February 1983	RHB	Right arm medium fast	0	(Namibia) United
6	Morne Karg (wk)	12 July 1977	RHB	Unknown	0	(Namibia) United
1	Danie Keulder	2 August 1973	RHB	Right arm off spin	0	(Namibia) Wanderers
21	Bjorn Kotze	11 December 1978	RHB	Right arm medium fast	0	(Namibia) Wanderers
10	Lennie Louw	19 June 1959	RHB	Slow left arm orthodox	0	(Namibia) CCD
17	Johannes van der Merwe	5 February 1980	RHB	Right arm off spin	0	(Namibia) Unknown
27	Bryan Murgatroyd	19 October 1969	RHB	Right arm medium	0	(Namibia) Wanderers
11	Burton van Rooi	9 July 1982	RHB	Right arm medium fast	0	(Namibia) CCD
13	Melt van Schoor (wk)	8 December 1967	RHB	Unknown	0	(Namibia) Police
8	Gerrie Snyman	30 April 1981	RHB	Right arm fast medium	0	(Namibia) United
15	Stefan Swanepoel	2 December 1981	RHB	Unknown	0	(Namibia) Wanderers
77	Rudi van Vuuren	20 September 1972	RHB	Right arm medium fast	0	(Namibia) Police
4	Riaan Walters	10 August 1980	RHB	Unknown	0	(Namibia) United

- Johannes van der Merwe replaced Riaan Walters on 28 February 2003

=== Netherlands ===
Coach: Emmerson Trotman

No.	Name	Date of birth	Batting	Bowling style	ODIs	Domestic team
1	Roland Lefebvre (c)	7 February 1963	RHB	Right arm medium fast	6	(Netherlands) VOC Rotterdam
19	Daan van Bunge	19 October 1982	RHB	Right arm leg spin	2	(Netherlands) Voorburg CC
28	Jacob-Jan Esmeijer	28 May 1972	RHB	Slow left arm orthodox	2	(Netherlands) Excelsior'20
4	Victor Grandia	10 January 1979	RHB	Right arm medium	1	(Netherlands) VRA Amsterdam
94	Feiko Kloppenburg	19 June 1974	RHB	Right arm medium	1	(Netherlands) Rood en Wit Haarlem
5	Tim de Leede	25 January 1968	RHB	Right arm medium	7	(Netherlands) Voorburg CC
14	Hendrik-Jan Mol	29 March 1977	LHB	Left arm medium	1	(Netherlands) Quick Den Haag
6	Ruud Nijman	15 June 1982	RHB	Right arm medium fast	0	(Netherlands) Hermes DVS
99	Klaas-Jan van Noortwijk	10 July 1970	RHB	Right arm medium	5	(Netherlands) VOC Rotterdam
4	Adeel Raja	15 August 1980	RHB	Right arm off spin	2	(Netherlands) VRA Amsterdam
9	Edgar Schiferli	17 May 1976	RHB	Right arm fast medium	2	(Netherlands) Quick Den Haag
8	Reinout Scholte (wk)	10 August 1967	RHB	Unknown	2	(Netherlands) VOC Rotterdam
10	Jeroen Smits (wk)	21 June 1972	RHB	Unknown	0	(Netherlands) HCC Den Haag
44	Nick Statham	15 March 1975	RHB	Right arm off spin	0	(Netherlands) Hermes DVS
69	Luuk van Troost	28 September 1969	LHB	Left arm medium	2	(Netherlands) Excelsior'20
97	Bas Zuiderent	3 March 1977	RHB	Right arm medium	7	(England) Sussex

- Ruud Nijman replaced Victor Grandia on 21 January 2003

=== Pakistan ===
Pakistan's squad was announced on 31 December 2002.

Coach: Richard Pybus

No.	Name	Date of birth	Batting	Bowling style	ODIs	Domestic team
99	Waqar Younis (c)	16 November 1971	RHB	Right arm fast	256	(Pakistan) National Bank
12	Abdul Razzaq	2 December 1979	RHB	Right arm fast medium	119	(Pakistan) PIA
11	Azhar Mahmood	28 February 1975	RHB	Right arm fast medium	123	(Pakistan) PIA
8	Inzamam-ul-Haq	3 March 1970	RHB	Slow left arm orthodox	284	(Pakistan) National Bank
7	Mohammad Sami	24 February 1981	RHB	Right arm fast	18	(Pakistan) National Bank
5	Rashid Latif (wk)	14 October 1968	RHB	Right arm leg spin	143	(Pakistan) Allied Bank
1	Saeed Anwar	6 September 1968	LHB	Slow left arm orthodox	242	(Pakistan) National Bank
28	Saleem Elahi	21 November 1976	RHB	Right arm off spin	36	(Pakistan) Habib Bank
9	Saqlain Mushtaq	29 December 1976	RHB	Right arm off spin	165	(Pakistan) PIA
10	Shahid Afridi	1 March 1980	RHB	Right arm leg spin	173	(Pakistan) Habib Bank
14	Shoaib Akhtar	13 August 1975	RHB	Right arm fast	75	(Pakistan) Khan Research Labs
2	Taufeeq Umar	20 June 1981	LHB	Right arm off spin	6	(Pakistan) Habib Bank
3	Wasim Akram	3 June 1966	LHB	Left arm fast	350	(Pakistan) PIA
75	Younis Khan	29 November 1977	RHB	Right arm leg spin	70	(Pakistan) Habib Bank
13	Yousuf Youhana	27 August 1974	RHB	Right arm off spin	121	(Pakistan) PIA

=== Zimbabwe ===
Coach: Geoff Marsh

No.	Name	Date of birth	Batting	Bowling style	ODIs	Domestic team
9	Heath Streak (c)	16 March 1974	RHB	Right arm fast medium	149	(Zimbabwe) Matabeleland
99	Andy Blignaut	1 August 1978	LHB	Right arm fast medium	16	(Zimbabwe) Mashonaland
20	Alistair Campbell	23 September 1972	LHB	Right arm off spin	187	(Zimbabwe) Manicaland
22	Dion Ebrahim	7 August 1980	RHB	Right arm medium	36	(Zimbabwe) Mashonaland
14	Sean Ervine	6 December 1982	LHB	Right arm medium	13	(Zimbabwe) Midlands
33	Andy Flower (wk)	28 April 1968	LHB	Right arm off spin	205	(Zimbabwe) Mashonaland
68	Grant Flower	20 December 1970	RHB	Slow left arm orthodox	192	(Zimbabwe) Mashonaland
18	Travis Friend	7 January 1981	RHB	Right arm fast medium	39	(Zimbabwe) Midlands
79	Douglas Hondo	7 July 1979	RHB	Right arm fast medium	13	(Zimbabwe) Mashonaland
42	Dougie Marillier	24 April 1978	RHB	Right arm off spin	35	(Zimbabwe) Midlands
45	Stuart Matsikenyeri	3 May 1983	RHB	Right arm off spin	2	(Zimbabwe) Manicaland
27	Brian Murphy	1 December 1976	RHB	Right arm leg spin	26	(Zimbabwe) Mashonaland
77	Henry Olonga	3 July 1976	RHB	Right arm fast	48	(Zimbabwe) Manicaland
44	Tatenda Taibu (wk)	14 May 1983	RHB	Right arm off spin	20	(Zimbabwe) Mashonaland
8	Mark Vermeulen	2 March 1979	RHB	Right arm off spin	7	(Zimbabwe) Matabeleland
2	Guy Whittall	5 September 1972	RHB	Right arm medium	141	(Zimbabwe) Manicaland
10	Craig Wishart	9 January 1974	RHB	Right arm off spin	72	(Zimbabwe) Midlands

- Alistair Campbell replaced Mark Vermeulen on 10 March 2003
- Stuart Matsikenyeri replaced Brian Murphy on 10 March 2003

== Group B ==
=== Bangladesh ===
Coach: (Pakistan) Mohsin Kamal

No.	Name	Date of birth	Batting	Bowling style	ODIs	Domestic team(s)
10	Khaled Mashud (c/wk)	8 February 1976	RHB	Unknown	51	(Bangladesh) Victoria / Rajshahi
6	Akram Khan	1 November 1968	RHB	Right arm medium	38	(Bangladesh) Chittagong
33	Al Sahariar	23 April 1978	RHB	Right arm leg spin	22	(Bangladesh) Victoria / Dhaka
14	Alok Kapali	1 January 1984	RHB	Right arm leg spin	11	(Bangladesh) Victoria / Sylhet
44	Ehsanul Haque	1 December 1979	RHB	Right arm off spin	2	(Bangladesh) Mohammedan / Chittagong
7	Habibul Bashar	17 August 1972	RHB	Right arm off spin	27	(Bangladesh) Biman
50	Hannan Sarkar	1 December 1982	RHB	Right arm medium	4	(Bangladesh) Surjotorun / Barisal
11	Khaled Mahmud	26 July 1971	RHB	Right arm medium fast	34	(Bangladesh) Biman / Dhaka
96	Manjural Islam	7 November 1979	LHB	Left arm fast medium	26	(Bangladesh) Victoria / Khulna
2	Mashrafe Mortaza	5 October 1983	RHB	Right arm fast medium	3	(Bangladesh) Azad / Khulna
98	Mohammad Ashraful	7 July 1984	RHB	Right arm leg spin	11	(Bangladesh) Surjotorun / Dhaka
77	Mohammad Rafique	5 September 1970	LHB	Slow left arm orthodox	34	(Bangladesh) Mohammedan / Dhaka
9	Sanwar Hossain	5 August 1973	RHB	Right arm off spin	14	(Bangladesh) Mohammedan / Barisal
69	Talha Jubair	10 December 1985	RHB	Right arm medium fast	4	(Bangladesh) Kalabagan / Dhaka
19	Tapash Baisya	15 December 1982	RHB	Right arm fast medium	10	(Bangladesh) Mohammedan / Sylhet
55	Tushar Imran	20 December 1983	RHB	Right arm medium	13	(Bangladesh) City Club / Khulna

- Akram Khan replaced Mashrafe Mortaza on 19 February 2003

=== Canada ===
Coach: Gus Logie

No.	Name	Date of birth	Batting	Bowling style	ODIs	Domestic team
1	Joe Harris (c)	16 August 1965	RHB	Right arm off spin	0	(Canada) Toronto
10	Ashish Bagai (wk)	26 January 1982	RHB	Unknown	0	(Canada) Toronto
3	Ian Billcliff	26 October 1972	RHB	Right arm medium	0	(Canada) Vikings
6	Desmond Chumney	8 January 1968	RHB	Right arm off spin	0	(Canada) Victoria Park
15	Austin Codrington	22 August 1975	RHB	Right arm medium fast	0	(Canada) Overseas
9	John Davison	9 May 1970	RHB	Right arm off spin	0	South Australia
2	Nicholas de Groot	22 October 1975	RHB	Right arm medium	0	(Canada) Vikings
16	Nicholas Ifill	24 November 1968	RHB	Right arm medium	0	(Canada) Victoria Park
12	Davis Joseph	31 July 1963	RHB	Right arm medium fast	0	(Canada) Victoria Park
4	Ishwar Maraj	26 January 1969	LHB	Right arm off spin	0	(Canada) Overseas
8	Ashish Patel	31 July 1975	RHB	Right arm medium	0	(Canada) Quebec
21	Abdool Samad (wk)	3 May 1979	RHB	Right arm off spin	0	(Canada) Cavaliers
7	Fazil Samad	6 April 1975	RHB	Right arm off spin	0	(Canada) Cavaliers
14	Barry Seebaran	12 September 1972	RHB	Slow left arm orthodox	0	(Canada) Richmond
11	Sanjayan Thuraisingam	11 September 1969	RHB	Right arm fast medium	0	(Canada) Toronto

=== Kenya ===
Coach: Sandeep Patil

No.	Name	Date of birth	Batting	Bowling style	ODIs	Domestic team
5	Steve Tikolo (c)	25 June 1971	RHB	Right arm medium	51	(Kenya) Swamibapa, Nairobi
12	Joseph Angara	8 November 1971	RHB	Right arm medium	15	(Kenya) Swamibapa, Nairobi
1	Aasif Karim	15 December 1963	RHB	Slow left arm orthodox	30	(Kenya) Jaffery, Mombasa
18	Hitesh Modi	13 October 1971	LHB	Right arm off spin	41	(Kenya) Nairobi Gymkhana, Kisumu
22	Collins Obuya	27 July 1981	RHB	Right arm leg spin	16	(Kenya) Ruaraka, Nairobi
21	David Obuya (wk)	14 August 1979	RHB	[wk]	16	(Kenya) Ruaraka, Nairobi
55	Thomas Odoyo	12 May 1978	RHB	Right arm medium fast	51	(Kenya) Nairobi Gymkhana, Nairobi
69	Maurice Odumbe	15 June 1969	RHB	Right arm off spin	50	(Kenya) Aga Khan, Nairobi
77	Peter Ongondo	10 February 1977	RHB	Right arm medium	8	(Kenya) Swamibapa, Nairobi
28	Kennedy Otieno (wk)	11 March 1972	RHB	Unknown	49	(Kenya) Ruaraka, Nairobi
14	Brijal Patel	14 November 1977	RHB	Slow left arm orthodox	13	(Kenya) Premier, Nairobi
4	Ravindu Shah	28 August 1972	RHB	Right arm medium	33	(Kenya) Nairobi Gymkhana, Nairobi
10	Martin Suji	2 June 1971	RHB	Right arm medium fast	49	(Kenya) Aga Khan, Nairobi
9	Tony Suji	5 February 1976	RHB	Right arm medium	35	(Kenya) Aga Khan, Nairobi
7	Alpesh Vadher	7 September 1974	RHB	Unknown	18	(Kenya) Premier, Nairobi

=== New Zealand ===
Coach: John Bracewell

No.	Name	Date of birth	Batting	Bowling style	ODIs	Domestic team
7	Stephen Fleming (c)	1 April 1973	LHB	Right arm medium	189	(New Zealand) Wellington
41	Andre Adams	17 July 1975	RHB	Right arm fast medium	20	(New Zealand) Auckland
9	Nathan Astle	15 September 1971	RHB	Right arm medium	167	(New Zealand) Canterbury
27	Shane Bond	7 June 1975	RHB	Right arm fast	18	(New Zealand) Canterbury
6	Chris Cairns	13 June 1970	RHB	Right arm fast medium	154	(New Zealand) Canterbury
5	Chris Harris	20 November 1969	LHB	Right Arm Medium	219	(New Zealand) Canterbury
42	Brendon McCullum (wk)	27 September 1981	RHB	Right Arm Medium	14	(New Zealand) Otago
10	Craig McMillan	13 September 1976	RHB	Right arm medium	124	(New Zealand) Canterbury
20	Kyle Mills	15 March 1979	RHB	Right arm fast medium	16	(New Zealand) Auckland
24	Jacob Oram	28 July 1978	LHB	Right arm fast medium	29	(New Zealand) Central Districts
18	Mathew Sinclair	9 November 1975	RHB	Right arm medium fast bowling	32	(New Zealand) Central Districts
56	Scott Styris	10 July 1975	RHB	Right arm medium	51	(New Zealand) Northern Districts
14	Daryl Tuffey	11 June 1978	RHB	Right arm fast medium	44	(New Zealand) Northern Districts
11	Daniel Vettori	27 January 1979	LHB	Slow left arm orthodox	99	(New Zealand) Northern Districts
8	Lou Vincent (wk)	11 November 1978	RHB	Right arm medium	47	(New Zealand) Auckland

=== South Africa ===
Coach: Eric Simons

No.	Name	Date of birth	Batting	Bowling style	ODIs	Domestic team
7	Shaun Pollock (c)	16 July 1973	RHB	Right arm fast medium	180	(South Africa) KwaZulu-Natal
12	Nicky Boje	20 March 1973	LHB	Slow left arm orthodox	85	(South Africa) Free State
9	Mark Boucher (wk)	6 December 1976	RHB	Right arm medium	137	(South Africa) Border
77	Boeta Dippenaar	14 June 1977	RHB	Right arm off spin	50	(South Africa) Free State
10	Allan Donald	20 October 1966	RHB	Right arm fast	161	(South Africa) Free State
00	Herschelle Gibbs	23 February 1974	RHB	Right arm medium	117	(South Africa) Western Province
99	Andrew Hall	31 July 1975	RHB	Right arm fast medium	26	(South Africa) Northerns
65	Jacques Kallis	16 October 1975	RHB	Right arm fast medium	168	(South Africa) Western Province
1	Gary Kirsten	23 November 1967	LHB	Right arm off spin	179	(South Africa) Western Province
69	Lance Klusener	4 September 1971	LHB	Right arm fast medium	149	(South Africa) KwaZulu-Natal
67	Charl Langeveldt	17 December 1974	RHB	Right arm fast medium	3	(South Africa) Boland
16	Makhaya Ntini	6 July 1977	RHB	Right arm fast	62	(South Africa) Border
13	Robin Peterson	4 August 1979	LHB	Slow left arm orthodox	6	(South Africa) Eastern Province
8	Jonty Rhodes	27 July 1969	RHB	Right arm medium	243	(South Africa) KwaZulu-Natal
15	Graeme Smith	1 February 1981	LHB	Right arm off spin	19	(South Africa) Western Province
14	Monde Zondeki	25 July 1982	RHB	Right arm fast	2	(South Africa) Border

- Graeme Smith replaced Jonty Rhodes on 13 February 2003

=== Sri Lanka ===
Coach: Dav Whatmore

No.	Name	Date of birth	Batting	Bowling style	ODIs	Domestic team
07	Sanath Jayasuriya (c)	30 June 1969	LHB	Slow left arm orthodox	287	(Sri Lanka) Bloomfield
69	Russel Arnold	25 October 1973	LHB	Right arm off spin	109	(Sri Lanka) Nondescripts
46	Marvan Atapattu	22 November 1970	RHB	Right arm leg spin	180	(Sri Lanka) Sinhalese SC
21	Charitha Buddhika	22 August 1980	RHB	Right arm medium fast	14	(Sri Lanka) Panadura
23	Aravinda de Silva	17 October 1965	RHB	Right arm off spin	298	(Sri Lanka) Nondescripts
26	Dilhara Fernando	19 July 1979	RHB	Right arm fast	45	(Sri Lanka) Sinhalese SC
27	Pulasthi Gunaratne	27 September 1973	RHB	Right arm fast medium	17	(Sri Lanka) Tamil Union
66	Avishka Gunawardene	26 May 1977	LHB	Unknown	40	(Sri Lanka) Sinhalese SC
92	Mahela Jayawardene	27 May 1977	RHB	Right arm medium	131	(Sri Lanka) Sinhalese SC
11	Jehan Mubarak	10 January 1981	LHB	Right arm off spin	5	(Sri Lanka) Colombo
08	Muttiah Muralitharan	17 April 1972	RHB	Right arm off spin	203	(Sri Lanka) Tamil Union
25	Prabath Nissanka	25 October 1980	RHB	Right arm medium fast	11	(Sri Lanka) Bloomfield
84	Kumar Sangakkara (wk)	27 October 1977	LHB	Right arm off spin	75	(Sri Lanka) Nondescripts
09	Hashan Tillakaratne	14 July 1967	LHB	Right arm off spin	188	(Sri Lanka) Nondescripts
22	Chaminda Vaas	27 January 1974	LHB	Left arm fast medium	210	(Sri Lanka) Colts

=== West Indies ===
Coach: Roger Harper

No.	Name	Date of birth	Batting	Bowling style	ODIs	Domestic team
4	Carl Hooper (c)	15 December 1966	RHB	Right arm off spin	221	Guyana
6	Shivnarine Chanderpaul	16 August 1974	LHB	Right arm leg spin	126	Guyana
17	Pedro Collins	12 August 1976	RHB	Left arm fast medium	20	Barbados
32	Corey Collymore	21 December 1977	RHB	Right arm fast medium	31	Barbados
23	Mervyn Dillon	5 June 1974	RHB	Right arm fast medium	74	Trinidad and Tobago
48	Vasbert Drakes	5 August 1969	RHB	Right arm medium fast	17	Barbados
45	Chris Gayle	21 September 1979	LHB	Right arm off spin	62	Jamaica
68	Wavell Hinds	7 September 1976	LHB	Right arm medium	64	Jamaica
7	Ridley Jacobs (wk)	26 November 1967	LHB	Unknown	112	(Antigua and Barbuda) Leeward Islands
9	Brian Lara	2 May 1969	LHB	Right arm leg spin	203	Trinidad and Tobago
38	Jermaine Lawson	13 January 1982	RHB	Right arm fast medium	5	Jamaica
77	Nixon McLean	20 July 1973	LHB	Right arm fast medium	44	(Saint Vincent and the Grenadines) Windward Islands
34	Ricardo Powell	16 December 1978	RHB	Right arm off spin	58	Jamaica
52	Marlon Samuels	5 January 1981	RHB	Right arm off spin	39	Jamaica
53	Ramnaresh Sarwan	23 June 1980	RHB	Right arm leg spin	29	Guyana

- Marlon Samuels was replaced by Ryan Hinds on 29 January 2003, but was reinstated on 8 February 2003
