= 2002 Six Nations Challenge =

2002 ICC Six Nations Challenge
- Dates: 7 – 14 April 2002
- Administrator: ICC
- Cricket format: List A (50 overs)
- Tournament format: Round-robin
- Host: Namibia
- Champions: Kenya (2nd title)
- Participants: 6
- Matches: 16
- Most runs: (Zimbabwe) Dougie Marillier (222)
- Most wickets: (Kenya) Maurice Odumbe (12)

The 2002 ICC Six Nations Challenge was the second edition of the ICC Six Nations Challenge. It was an international limited-overs cricket tournament held in Namibia from 7 to 14 April 2002. All matches at the tournament were played in Windhoek.

== Squads ==
Canada Coach: Jeff Thomas	Kenya Coach: Sandeep Patil	Namibia
Joseph Harris (c); Ashish Bagai; Ian Billcliff; Desmond Chumney; Austin Codrington; John Davison; Nicholas de Groot; Muneeb Diwan; Davis Joseph; Ishwar Maraj; Ashish Patel; Abdul Sattaur; Barry Seebaran; Sanjayan Thuraisingam	Steve Tikolo (c); Joseph Angara; Jadavji Bhimji; Alfred Luseno; Hitesh Modi; Collins Obuya; David Obuya; Thomas Odoyo; Maurice Odumbe; Peter Ongondo; Kennedy Otieno; Maurice Ouma; Ravindu Shah; Martin Suji	Deon Kotze (c); Jan-Berrie Burger; Louis Burger; Sarel Burger; Morne Karg; Danie Keulder; Bjorn Kotze; Lennie Louw; Gavin Murgatroyd; Gerrie Snyman; Melt van Schoor; Johannes van der Merwe; Rudi van Vuuren; Riaan Walters
Netherlands Coach: Emmerson Trotman	Sri Lanka A Coach: Chandika Hathurusingha	Zimbabwe A
Roland Lefebvre (c); Zulfiqar Ahmed; Roger Bradley; Tim de Leede; Jacob-Jan Esmeijer; Asim Khan; Feiko Kloppenburg; Edgar Schiferli; Reinout Scholte; Nick Statham; Klaas-Jan van Noortwijk; Robert van Oosterom; Luuk van Troost; Bas Zuiderent	Thilan Samaraweera (c); Akalanka Ganegama; Avishka Gunawardene; Rangana Herath; Chinthaka Jayasinghe; Prasanna Jayawardene; Dulip Liyanage; Kaushal Lokuarachchi; Jehan Mubarak; Bathiya Perera; Ruchira Perera; Anushka Polonowita; Chamara Silva; Gayan Wijekoon	Guy Whittall (c); Charles Coventry; Craig Evans; Trevor Gripper; Douglas Hondo; Campbell Macmillan; Alester Maregwede; Dougie Marillier; Stanley Marisa; David Mutendera; Waddington Mwayenga; Gavin Rennie; Richard Sims; Brighton Watambwa

== Round-robin ==
=== Points table ===
Team	Pld	W	L	NR	BP	Pts	NRR
Sri Lanka A	5	4	0	1	3	21	+1.536
Kenya	5	3	1	1	1	15	+0.745
Zimbabwe A	5	3	2	0	2	14	+0.368
Namibia	5	2	3	0	1	9	–0.011
Canada	5	1	4	0	0	4	–0.979
Netherlands	5	1	4	0	0	4	–1.161

=== Fixtures ===
7 April
Scorecard

Netherlands; 211 (48.4 overs)	v	Canada; 195 (48 overs)

Netherlands won by 16 runs
Trans Namib Ground, Windhoek

7 April
Scorecard

Kenya; 262/7 (50 overs)	v	Zimbabwe A 244 (48.3 overs)

Kenya won by 18 runs
United Ground, Windhoek

7 April
Scorecard

Namibia; 182 (49.2 overs)	v	Sri Lanka A 183/3 (35.4 overs)

Sri Lanka A won by 7 wickets
Wanderers Cricket Ground, Windhoek

8 April
Scorecard

Kenya; 239/8 (50 overs)	v	Canada; 138 (38.2 overs)

Kenya won by 101 runs
Wanderers Cricket Ground, Windhoek

8 April
Scorecard

Zimbabwe A 188 (45.1 overs)	v	Namibia; 181/9 (50 overs)

Zimbabwe A won by 7 runs
Trans Namib Ground, Windhoek

8 April
Scorecard

Sri Lanka A 253/5 (50 overs)	v	Netherlands; 115 (38.1 overs)

Sri Lanka A won by 138 runs
United Ground, Windhoek

10 April
Scorecard

Kenya; 291/7 (50 overs)	v	Netherlands; 258/9 (50 overs)

Kenya won by 33 runs
Trans Namib Ground, Windhoek

10 April
Scorecard

Namibia; 170 (49.3 overs)	v	Canada; 171/8 (50 overs)

Canada won by 2 wickets
United Ground, Windhoek

10 April
Scorecard

Zimbabwe A 241/7 (50 overs)	v	Sri Lanka A 243/5 (45.4 overs)

Sri Lanka A won by 5 wickets
Wanderers Cricket Ground, Windhoek

11 April
Scorecard

Zimbabwe A 252/7 (50 overs)	v	Canada; 186 (38.2 overs)

Zimbabwe A won by 66 runs
Trans Namib Ground, Windhoek

11 April
Scorecard

Kenya; 175 (48 overs)	v	Sri Lanka A 73/4 (23.2 overs)

No result
United Ground, Windhoek

11 April
Scorecard

Namibia; 235/6 (50 overs)	v	Netherlands; 150 (32.1 overs)

Namibia won by 62 runs (D/L)
Wanderers Cricket Ground, Windhoek

13 April
Scorecard

Canada; 166 (42 overs)	v	Sri Lanka A 167/5 (36 overs)

Sri Lanka A won by 5 wickets
Trans Namib Ground, Windhoek

13 April
Scorecard

Kenya; 215/9 (50 overs)	v	Namibia; 218/9 (50 overs)

Namibia won by 1 wicket
United Ground, Windhoek

13 April
Scorecard

Zimbabwe A 204/9 (50 overs)	v	Netherlands; 147 (41 overs)

Zimbabwe A won by 57 runs
Wanderers Cricket Ground, Windhoek

== Final ==
14 April
Scorecard

Sri Lanka A 211 (49.4 overs)	v	Kenya; 212/7 (47.4 overs)
Jehan Mubarak 82 (113); Steve Tikolo 3/29 (9.4 overs)		David Obuya 41 (66); Akalanka Ganegama 2/39 (8 overs)

Kenya won by 3 wickets
Wanderers Cricket Ground, Windhoek
Umpires: Duncan Frost (Zim) and Rudi Koertzen (SAf)
Player of the match: Steve Tikolo (Kenya)

- Kenya won the toss and elected to bowl.

== Statistics ==
=== Most runs ===
The top five run-scorers are included in this table, ranked by runs scored, then by batting average, and then alphabetically.

Player	Team	Runs	Inns	Avg	Highest	100s	50s
Douglas Marillier	Zimbabwe A	222	5	55.50	99*	0	2
Hitesh Modi	Kenya	216	6	72.00	76*	0	1
Kennedy Otieno	Kenya	216	6	36.00	57	0	2
Thomas Odoyo	Kenya	196	6	32.66	60	0	2
Steve Tikolo	Kenya	196	6	32.66	75	0	1

Source: CricketArchive

=== Most wickets ===
The top five wicket-takers are listed in this table, ranked by wickets taken and then by bowling average.

Player	Team	Overs	Wkts	Ave	SR	Econ	BBI
Maurice Odumbe	Kenya	38.2	12	11.00	19.16	3.44	4/43
Thomas Odoyo	Kenya	40.0	10	14.10	24.00	3.52	5/27
Rangana Herath	Sri Lanka A	53.0	10	20.80	31.80	3.92	3/16
Douglas Hondo	Zimbabwe A	31.4	9	14.00	21.11	3.97	3/29
Bjorn Kotze	Namibia	37.0	9	21.22	24.66	5.16	4/43

Source: CricketArchive
