= Namibia at the Cricket World Cup =

The Namibia cricket team is the team that represents the country of Namibia in international cricket matches. It is governed by Cricket Namibia, an associate member of the International Cricket Council since 1992 and became part of the High Performance Program in 2007. They took part in the 2003 Cricket World Cup in South Africa, though they lost all their games. They have played in each edition of the ICC Intercontinental Cup.

== Cricket World Cup Record ==
=== By tournament ===
Cricket World Cup record								Qualification record				
Year	Round	Position	GP	W	L	T	NR	Pld	W	L	T	NR
(England) 1975	Not an ICC member							No qualifier held				
(England) 1979	Not an ICC member							Did not participate				
(England) 1983	Not an ICC member							Did not participate				
(India) (Pakistan) 1987	Not an ICC member							Did not participate				
(Australia) (New Zealand) 1992	Not an ICC member							Did not participate				
(India) (Pakistan) (Sri Lanka) 1996	Did not qualify							7	4	3	0	0
(England) (Scotland) (Republic of Ireland) (Netherlands) 1999	Did not qualify							6	2	4	0	0
(South Africa) (Zimbabwe) (Kenya) 2003	Group Stage	14/14	6	0	6	0	0	8	7	1	0	0
(Cricket West Indies) 2007	Did not qualify							12	8	4	0	0
(India) (Bangladesh) (Sri Lanka) 2011	Did not qualify							18	6	12	0	0
(Australia) (New Zealand) 2015	Did not qualify							29	10	19	0	0
(England) 2019	Did not qualify							26	10	16	0	0
(India) 2023	Did not qualify							41	22	18	0	1
Total	Group Stage	1/13	6	0	6	0	0	147	69	77	0	1

=== By team ===
Opposition	Matches	Won	Tie/NR	Lost
Australia	1	0	0	1
England	1	0	0	1
India	1	0	0	1
Netherlands	1	0	0	1
Pakistan	1	0	0	1
Zimbabwe	1	0	0	1
Total	6	0	0	6

== 2003 World Cup ==
The World Cup itself started on 10 February 2003 in Harare with Zimbabwe beating Namibia by 86 runs. Back in South Africa, they lost to Pakistan by 171 runs. This was followed by a 55-run defeat at the hands of England in a match where Namibia performed with some credit, Jan-Berrie Burger winning the man of the match award for his innings of 85 that almost helped Namibia pull off an unlikely upset. They then lost by 181 runs to India and a 256 run defeat against Australia, the eventual winners of the tournament, in what at the time was the biggest winning margin in One Day Internationals, since surpassed by an Indian 257 run win over Bermuda. The tournament finished with a 64 run loss to fellow qualifiers the Netherlands.

Squad

- Deon Kotzé (c)
- Sarel Burger
- Stephan Swanepoel
- Danie Keulder
- Louis Burger
- Jan-Berrie Burger
- Rudi van Vuuren
- Gerrie Snyman
- Björn Kotzé
- Burton van Rooi
- Morne Karg (wk)
- Melt van Schoor (wk)
- Johannes van der Merwe
- Lennie Louw
- Bryan Murgatroyd

Results

Pool stage (Pool A)							Super Sixes		Semifinal	Final	Overall Result
Opposition Result	Opposition Result	Opposition Result	Opposition Result	Opposition Result	Opposition Result	Rank	Opposition Result	Rank	Opposition Result	Opposition Result	Overall Result
Zimbabwe; L by 86 runs (D/L)	Pakistan; L by 171 runs	England; L by 55 runs	India; L by 181 runs	Australia; L by 256 runs	Netherlands; L by 64 runs	7	Did not advance				Pool stage

Scorecards

Pool stage (Pool A)

10 February 2003
Scorecard

Zimbabwe; 340/2 (50 overs)	v	Namibia; 104/5 (25.1 overs)
Craig Wishart 172* (151); Lennie Louw 1/60 (10 overs)		Danie Keulder 27 (46); Guy Whittall 2/20 (5 overs)

Zimbabwe won by 86 runs (D/L)
Harare Sports Club, Harare, Zimbabwe
Umpires: Dave Orchard (South Africa) and Simon Taufel (Australia).
Player of the match: Craig Wishart (Zimbabwe)

- Match shortened due to rain; Duckworth-Lewis revised target to win: 191 runs in 25.1 overs for Namibia.

16 February 2003
Scorecard

Pakistan; 255/9 (50 overs)	v	Namibia; 84 (17.4 overs)
Saleem Elahi 63 (100); Bjorn Kotze 2/51 (10 overs)		Bjorn Kotze 24* (29); Wasim Akram 5/28 (9 overs)

Pakistan won by 171 runs
De Beers Diamond Oval, Kimberley, South Africa
Umpires: Neil Mallender (SA) and Dave Orchard (SA).
Player of the match: Wasim Akram (Pak)

19 February 2003
Scorecard

England; 272 (50 overs)	v	Namibia; 217/9 (50 overs)
Alec Stewart 60 (77); Rudi van Vuuren 5/43 (10 overs)		Jan-Berrie Burger 85 (86); Ronnie Irani 3/30 (8 overs)

England won by 55 runs
St George's Park, Port Elizabeth, South Africa
Umpires: Simon Taufel (Aus) and Srinivas Venkataraghavan (Ind)
Player of the match: Jan-Berrie Burger (Nam)

23 February 2003
Scorecard

India; 311/2 (50 overs)	v	Namibia; 130 (42.3 overs)
Sachin Tendulkar 152 (151); Rudi van Vuuren 2/53 (10 overs)		Jan-Berrie Burger 29 (30); Yuvraj Singh 4/6 (4.3 overs)

India won by 181 runs
City Oval, Pietermaritzburg, South Africa
Umpires: Aleem Dar (Pak) and David Shepherd (Eng)
Player of the match: Sachin Tendulkar (Ind)

27 February 2003
Scorecard

Australia; 301/6 (50 overs)	v	Namibia; 45 (14 overs)
Matthew Hayden 88 (77); Louis Burger 3/39 (10 overs)		Deon Kotze 10 (14); Glenn McGrath 7/15 (7 overs)

Australia won by 256 runs
North West Cricket Stadium, Potchefstroom, South Africa
Umpires: Billy Bowden (Nzl) and Russell Tiffin (Zim)
Player of the match: Glenn McGrath (Aus)

27 February 2003
Scorecard

Netherlands; 314/4 (50 overs)	v	Namibia; 250 (46.5 overs)
Klaas-Jan van Noortwijk 134 (129); Louis Burger 2/49 (10 overs)		Gavin Murgatroyd 52 (62); Feiko Kloppenburg 4/42 (10 overs)

Netherlands won by 64 runs
Goodyear Park, Bloemfontein, South Africa
Umpires: Daryl Harper (Aus) and Nadeem Ghauri (Pak)
Player of the match: Feiko Kloppenburg (NLD)

== See also ==
- Namibia national cricket team
- Cricket in Namibia
