= Namibia cricket team in Kenya in 2002–03 =

Namibia national cricket team tour

The Namibia national cricket team toured Kenya in November 2002 and played six matches against Kenya. The touring Namibian team was captained by Deon Kotzé.

== Matches ==
2 November 2002
Scorecard

Kenya; 271/6 (50 overs)	v	Namibia; 272/6 (49.4 overs)
Steve Tikolo 88; Sarel Burger 3/37 (7 overs)		Jan-Berry Burger 110; Thomas Odoyo 2/42 (9.4 overs)

Namibia won by 4 wickets
Ruaraka Sports Club Ground, Nairobi
Umpires: Narendra Dave and Subhash Modi

- Kenya won the toss and decided to bat

3 November 2002
Scorecard

Kenya; 265/9 (50 overs)	v	Namibia; 242 (47.4 overs)
Hitesh Modi 88; Björn Kotzé 3/38 (10 overs)		Gerrie Snyman 85; Thomas Odoyo 3/44 (8.4 overs)

Kenya won by 23 runs
Ruaraka Sports Club Ground, Nairobi
Umpires: Lalji Bhudia and Rockie D'Mello

- Namibia won the toss and decided to field

5 November 2002
Scorecard

Kenya Cricket Association XI; 115 (33.4 overs)	v	Namibia; 116/7 (28.5 overs)
Morris Ouma 27; Burton van Rooi 4/26 (6 overs)		Deon Kotzé 28*; Peter Ongondo 3/23 (7 overs)

Namibia won by 3 wickets
Sir Ali Muslim Club Ground, Nairobi
Umpires: M. Alam and Ashok Ghose

- Kenya Cricket Association XI won the toss and decided to bat

6 November 2002
Scorecard

Namibia; 127/6 (34.3 overs)	v	Kenya
Jan-Berry Burger 46; Steve Tikolo 3/28 (7.3 overs)

No result
Ruaraka Sports Club Ground, Nairobi
Umpires: Narendra Dave and David Odhiambo

- Kenya won the toss and decided to field
- The match was reduced to 43 overs per side

8 November 2002
[ Scorecard]

Namibia; 96 (38.2 overs)	v	Kenya Cricket Association XI; 97/0 (16.1 overs)
Gavin Murgatroyd 23; Jimmy Kamande 3/11 (6.2 overs)		Ravindu Shah 50*

Kenya Cricket Association XI won by 10 wickets
Ruaraka Sports Club Ground, Nairobi
Umpires: Narendra Dave and Ashok Ghose

- Kenya Cricket Association XI won the toss and decided to field

9 November 2002
Scorecard

Namibia; 200/8 (50 overs)	v	Kenya; 203/7 (46.4 overs)
Gavin Murgatroyd 64; Collins Obuya 3/36 (7 overs)		Brijal Patel 52; Lennie Louw 2/33 (9.4 overs)

Kenya won by 3 wickets
Ruaraka Sports Club Ground, Nairobi
Umpires: Subhash Modi and A. Sattar

- Kenya won the toss and decided to field
