= List of cricket grounds in Kenya =

This is a list of cricket grounds in Kenya. Following initial colonisation by the Portuguese, Kenya gradually came under influence of the British Empire in the latter part of the 19th century and in the first half of the 20th century. Cricket was probably introduced to the country in the 1880s by the British. Since then and following independence the sport has continued to grow, with Kenya being in recent history one of the stronger Associate members of the International Cricket Council. The grounds included in this list have held at least one first-class, List A or Twenty20 match. Additionally, some have held One Day Internationals and Twenty20 Internationals.

Official name (known as)	City or town	Capacity	Notes	Ref
Aga Khan Sports Club Ground	Nairobi	Unknown	Has held four One Day Internationals, two first-class matches and five List A matches	
Coast Gymkhana Club Ground	Mombasa	Unknown	Has held a single List A match in 2010	
Gymkhana Club Ground	Nairobi	7,000	Has held 62 One Day Internationals and five T20 Internationals. Has additionally hosted thirteen first-class matches, 84 List A matches and nine Twenty20 matches	
Jaffery Sports Club Ground	Nairobi	2,000	Has held five One Day Internationals (the only official List A matches on this ground).	
Mombasa Sports Club Ground	Mombasa	1,000	Has held twelve One Day Internationals and three T20 Internationals (the only official T20 matches on this ground). Has also hosted six first-class matches (initially in 1964) and 22 List A matches	
Nairobi Club Ground	Nairobi	Unknown	Has held a single One Day International in 1996 (the only List A match on this ground)	
Ruaraka Sports Club Ground	Nairobi	Unknown	Has held five One Day Internationals, four first-class matches and eleven List A matches	
Simba Union Ground	Nairobi	Unknown	Has held a single One Day International in 2001, three first-class matches and three List A matches	
Sir Ali Muslim Club Ground	Nairobi	Unknown	Has held a single first-class match and three List A matches	

Locations of all stadiums which have hosted an international cricket match within Kenya
