= Shahid Bwibo =

Kenyan cricketer

Personal information
- Full name: Kennedy Shahid Bwibo
- Born: 15 May 1968 (age 58); Nairobi, Kenya
- Bowling: Right-arm medium

International information
- National side: Kenya (1997)

Career statistics
Competition	List A
Matches	1
Runs scored	2
Batting average	–
100s/50s	0/0
Top score	2*
Balls bowled	12
Wickets	0
Bowling average	–
5 wickets in innings	–
10 wickets in match	–
Best bowling	–
Catches/stumpings	1/–
- Source: CricketArchive, 9 February 2015

Kennedy Shahid Bwibo (born 15 May 1968) is a former Kenyan cricketer whose single list-A appearance for the Kenyan national side came in March 1997.

Born in Nairobi, Bwibo's club cricket was played for the Sir Ali Muslim Club. Described by a CricInfo writer as a "burly right arm opening bowler", his best performance at that level was 8/28. Bwibo's sole high-level match for Kenya came during the 1996–97 South African season, when the team participated in the Standard Bank Cup (a limited overs interprovincial knockout tournament). Kenya were drawn against Natal in its quarter-final, and were knocked out of the tournament after losing by 104 runs. Bowling second-change behind Martin Suji, Thomas Odoyo, and Tony Suji, Bwibo conceded 13 runs from his two overs, with Natal's batting line-up featuring South African national side players Andrew Hudson, Pat Symcox, Jonty Rhodes, Shaun Pollock, and Lance Klusener. After the conclusion of his playing career, Bwibo became involved in coaching. For the 2008 edition of the Sahara Elite League (what was to be the first and only edition of the competition), he was named coach of the Eastern Aces franchise, which was captained by Steve Tikolo.
