= Greensteds School =

School in Kenya

Location
- 0°20′32″S 36°10′33″E

Information
- Established: 1936; 90 years ago
- Language: English
- Houses: Kibo; Batian; Nelion

Greensteds School is a Kenyan mixed day and boarding school situated 17 kilometres (11 miles) south of Nakuru, Nakuru County, Rift Valley Province.

== Establishment and location ==
The school was established in 1936 on a 50-acre (200,000 m^{2}) piece of land.

== Curriculum ==
The school provides an English curriculum at both International General Certificate of Secondary Education and A-levels in subjects in the arts, ranging from French as second language to mathematics and the sciences. The exam board may vary as Greensteds offers both Edexcel and CIE, and GCSE

== Sports ==
The school competes against other Kenyan international schools. In the Michaelmas term, cricket is played by both genders.

The second term (Hilary) has hockey as the sport for both genders. In the last term (Trinity) boys play rugby, football and basketball, while the girls play netball.

Athletics is practiced, particularly before sports day (Michaelmas term). Events include short distances (100 m) and longer distances (1500 m) as well as long, triple and high jump.

The school has a 25-meter-long swimming pool, opened in 2000, which is the scene of internal and inter-school swimming competitions particularly in Hilary term.

Other sports practiced are karate, tennis, cycling, hiking, athletics, football, dance, horse riding, taekwondo, gym, golf, cross country running, and Field Athletics.

The school does not accept other extreme sports (e.g., motorcycles) for the safety of other students.

== See also ==
- Education in Kenya
- List of boarding schools
- List of cricket grounds in Kenya
- List of international schools
- List of schools in Kenya
