= Stephan Swanepoel =

Namibian cricketer

Personal information
- Full name: Stephan Jacobus Swanepoel
- Born: 2 December 1981 (age 44); Kathu, Namibia, South West Africa
- Batting: Right-handed
- Bowling: Right-arm off break
- Role: Batsman, wicket-keeper

International information
- National side: Namibia (1998–2009)
- ODI debut (cap 10): 10 February 2003 v Zimbabwe
- Last ODI: 27 February 2003 v Australia

Career statistics
Competition	ODI	FC	LA
Matches	5	8	25
Runs scored	43	372	312
Batting average	8.60	24.80	13.56
100s/50s	0/0	0/2	0/0
Top score	23	72	39
Catches/stumpings	0/–	3/–	10/–
- Source: ESPNcricinfo, 22 June 2017

Stephan Jacobus Swanepoel (also commonly known as Stefan Swanepoel; born 2 December 1981) is a Namibian cricketer who has represented the Namibian national team at international level. He played as a frontline right-handed batsman and specialist wicketkeeper. He has also played for Welwitschia Invitation XI, Blumfelde XI and Namibia A sides.

He made his international debut in February 2003. He was part of Namibia's first ever ODI team and also of Namibia's first ever World Cup team.

He holds the Namibian record of having played the most number of matches for Namibia at Under-19 World Cups with 19 matches coming in 3 different U-19 World Cup tournaments in 1998, 2000 and in 2002. He also holds the record for second joint most appearances by any player in the history of ICC U-19 Cricket World Cups along with Greg Thompson of Ireland. He also holds the record for being the all-time leading run-scorer for Namibia in Youth One-Day Internationals as well as in ICC Under-19 Cricket World Cup tournaments with a tally of 435 runs in 19 matches with all 19 off them at the U-19 World Cups.

== Early career ==
He was included in Namibian under-19 national squad for the 1998 Under-19 Cricket World Cup which also marked Namibia's debut at the ICC Under-19 Cricket World Cup. He also featured in the 2000 Under-19 Cricket World Cup which was held in Sri Lanka and it eventually marked his second consecutive appearance at the ICC U-19 Cricket World Cup.

He was a key member of the Namibian team which won the 2001 ICC Africa Under-19 Championship where Namibia finished the points table ahead of a combined East and Central Africa under-19 cricket team. It was also the first instance Namibia had won the ICC Africa Under-19 Championship and he was the top leading run scorer for Namibia during the course of the tournament aggregating 166 runs in 4 outings with a stellar average of 83.

He was a key member of the Namibian squad which reached the final of the 2001 ICC Trophy where Namibia enjoyed 10 consecutive wins before losing to the Netherlands off the last ball of the 2001 ICC Trophy Final. Netherlands managed to chase 196 on the final ball of the match but Namibia was able to qualify for the 2003 Cricket World Cup. He was present at the MCC's tour of Namibia in 2001. He also played in the 2002–03 Standard Bank Cup, making his List A debut against Eastern Province on 24 November 2002.

He captained Namibia under-19 national team during the 2002 Under-19 Cricket World Cup which was also his third ICC Under-19 Cricket World Cup appearance. During the 2002 ICC Under-19 Cricket World Cup, during a Plate Competition Group match against Scotland, he opened the batting and scored a century to become the first Namibian to score a century in ICC Under-19 Cricket World Cup history. He ended up scoring 142 runs off just 131 deliveries including 16 fours and 2 sixes with a strike rate of 108.39 and his knock propelled Namibia in its clinical chase of 235 to seal the deal. His knock of 142 in the 2002 U-19 World Cup still remains as the highest individual score for Namibia in an U-19 World Cup match as well as the highest individual score for Namibia in a Youth One-Day International. For his batting performances during the decisive match against Scotland, he was awarded the player of the match. He also guided Namibia to Plate Competition semi-final with a run a ball knock of 49 against Canada where Namibia successfully defended a modest total of 226 runs to win by a massive margin of 141 runs.

== Senior career ==
He was included in the Namibian national squad for the 2003 Cricket World Cup which also marked Namibia's maiden appearance in the Cricket World Cup. During his country's historic first World Cup appearance in 2003, he opened the batting alongside Jan-Berry Burger in five out of six group stage matches. He made his One Day International (ODI) debut on 10 February 2003 against neighbours Zimbabwe at the 2003 ICC Cricket World Cup, in what was considered as Namibia's first ever international cricket match, first ever ODI match as well as Namibia's first ever World Cup match. He overall endured a disappointing 2003 World Cup campaign after having scored only 43 runs in the 5 matches he had played and incidentally his all five World Cup match appearances were the only international matches he had managed to play as Namibia did not get to play any international official matches for 16 years until 2019. His last One Day International match in Namibian colours came during Namibia's group stage match against defending world champions Australia where Namibia suffered a massive defeat by a margin of 256 runs. He was left out of Namibian side for their final group stage match of 2003 World Cup against the Netherlands and he was replaced by Morné Karg who opened the batting for Namibia in the former's absence.

He made his first-class debut for Namibia against Uganda on 23 April 2004 during the 2004 ICC Intercontinental Cup. He was also part of the Namibian squad during the 2004 ICC Six Nations Challenge. He was also a member of the Namibian squad which finished at seventh position at the 2005 ICC Trophy.

One of his memorable innings came against the touring New Zealanders which included the likes of Shane Bond, Daniel Vettori, Kyle Mills and Chris Martin in a friendly warm-up 50 over tour match on 28 July 2005, in Wanderers Cricket Ground, Windhoek where he smashed a 43 ball 50 and put up a crucial tenth wicket partnership of 66 which came off just around 6 overs with tailender Kola Burger to give Namibia a glimmer of hope in a mammoth run chase of 331 runs. He along with Kola Burger lifted the Namibian side from a difficult position of 235/9 to 301 in the high scoring run chase and Namibia eventually fell short by just 29 runs, thereby missed out on creating a famous massive upset win over the Black Caps. Swanepoel was well supported by Kola Burger with the latter scoring a quickfire unbeaten knock of 45 runs off just 18 deliveries but the hopes of Namibia waned soon after the dismissal of Swanepoel who was the last man to be dismissed in Namibian innings by James Franklin with Kola Burger being the last man stranding for Namibia.

He also featured in the 2006–07 ICC Intercontinental Cup. His last competitive cricket match appearance came on 8 February 2009 which was a List A match when he turned up for Namibia against Free State during the Provincial One-Day Challenge.
