= 1994 ICC Trophy =

International cricket tournament

- Dates: 12 February – 6 March 1994
- Administrator: International Cricket Council
- Cricket format: Limited overs cricket
- Tournament format(s): Round-robin and Knockout
- Host: Kenya
- Champions: United Arab Emirates (1st title)
- Runners-up: Kenya
- Participants: 20
- Most runs: (Netherlands) Nolan Clarke (517)
- Most wickets: (Namibia) Gavin Murgatroyd (19) (Papua New Guinea) Fred Arua (19)

The 1994 ICC Trophy (formally the ABN AMRO ICC Trophy) was a cricket tournament that took place in Kenya between 12 February and 6 March 1994. It was the fifth ICC Trophy tournament to be staged, and acted as the Cricket World Cup qualification tournament for the 1996 Cricket World Cup.

Zimbabwe, the winners of the previous three tournaments, had been granted Full membership of the International Cricket Council (ICC) in 1992 and so automatically qualified for the World Cup.

For the first time three spots were on offer to qualify for the World Cup, and matches were played over 50 overs a side, though white clothing and red balls were still used.

The United Arab Emirates won the tournament, defeating host nation Kenya in the final, while the Netherlands won the third place play-off. The three sides thus qualified for the World Cup for the first time.

Being group champion, USA and PNG team qualified for plate final, but due to prescheduled flight schedule Namibia and Denmark played the plate final.

== Teams and squads ==
Twenty teams contested the tournament. All twenty associate members of the International Cricket Council (ICC) at the time were eligible to compete at the tournament and participated. Ireland, Namibia, and the United Arab Emirates were making their tournament debuts.

- Argentina
- Bangladesh
- Bermuda
- Canada
- Denmark
- Fiji
- Gibraltar
- East and Central Africa
- Hong Kong
- Ireland
- Israel
- Kenya
- Malaysia
- Namibia
- Netherlands
- Papua New Guinea
- Singapore
- United Arab Emirates
- United States
- West Africa

== First round ==
=== Group A ===
Team	Pld	W	L	T	NR	Pts	RR
Netherlands	4	4	0	0	0	16	2.320
Ireland	4	3	1	0	0	12	0.769
Papua New Guinea	4	2	2	0	0	8	0.115
Malaysia	4	1	3	0	0	4	-0.346
Gibraltar	4	0	4	0	0	0	-2.674
Source: CricketArchive

12–13 February
Scorecard

Papua New Guinea; 248/5 (50 overs)	v	Gibraltar; 113 (38.2 overs)

PNG won by 135 runs
Jaffery Sports Club, Nairobi

12 February
Scorecard

Malaysia; 118/9 (50 overs)	v	Netherlands; 119/1 (28.4 overs)

Netherlands won by 9 wickets
Nairobi Club Ground, Nairobi

14 February
Scorecard

Gibraltar; 80 (44.4 overs)	v	Netherlands; 85/0 (9.5 overs)

Netherlands won by 10 wickets
Premier Club Ground, Nairobi

14–15 February
Scorecard

Ireland; 230/8 (50 overs)	v	Papua New Guinea; 88/7 (32 overs)

Ireland won on faster scoring rate
Ngara Sports Club, Nairobi

- Papua New Guinea's innings was limited to 32 overs.

16–17 February
Scorecard

Gibraltar; 136/9 (50 overs)	v	Ireland; 138/4 (37.3 overs)

Ireland won by 6 wickets
Sir Ali Muslim Club Ground, Nairobi

16–17 February
Scorecard

Papua New Guinea; 165 (47.5 overs)	v	Malaysia; 121 (46.4 overs)

PNG won by 44 runs
Jaffery Sports Club, Nairobi

18 February
Scorecard

Malaysia; 253/4 (50 overs)	v	Gibraltar; 119/9 (50 overs)

Malaysia won by 134 runs
Ngara Sports Club, Nairobi

18 February
Scorecard

Netherlands; 235/8 (50 overs)	v	Ireland; 165 (48 overs)

Netherlands won by 70 runs
Ruaraka Sports Club, Nairobi

20 February
Scorecard

Malaysia; 110 (48.2 overs)	v	Ireland; 111/1 (24.3 overs)

Ireland won by 9 wickets
Simba Union Ground, Nairobi

20 February
Scorecard

Netherlands; 212/5 (50 overs)	v	Papua New Guinea; 113 (41 overs)

Netherlands won by 99 runs
Aga Khan Sports Club, Nairobi

=== Group B ===
Team	Pld	W	L	T	NR	Pts	RR
United Arab Emirates	4	4	0	0	0	16	1.305
Bangladesh	4	3	1	0	0	12	0.857
United States	4	2	2	0	0	8	1.265
Argentina	4	1	3	0	0	4	-1.310
East and Central Africa	4	0	4	0	0	0	-1.991
Source: CricketArchive

13–14 February
Scorecard

Argentina; 120 (43.2 overs)	v	Bangladesh; 123/3 (35.2 overs)

Bangladesh won by 7 wickets
Simba Union Ground, Nairobi

13–14 February
Scorecard

East and Central Africa; 92 (37.3 overs)	v	United Arab Emirates; 93/3 (26.5 overs)

UAE won by 7 wickets
Sir Ali Muslim Club Ground, Nairobi

15–16 February
Scorecard

East and Central Africa; 98 (36.2 overs)	v	Bangladesh; 99/3 (22.5 overs)

Bangladesh won by 7 wickets
Impala Sports Club, Nairobi

15–16 February
Scorecard

United States; 206 (47.5 overs)	v	United Arab Emirates; 209/6 (47.1 overs)

UAE won by 4 wickets
Aga Khan Sports Club, Nairobi

17 February
Scorecard

Argentina; 128 (49.2 overs)	v	United Arab Emirates; 129/2 (24.3 overs)

UAE won by 8 wickets
Jaffery Sports Club, Nairobi

17 February
Scorecard

East and Central Africa; 105 (35.1 overs)	v	United States; 106/1 (14.4 overs)

United States won by 9 wickets
Nairobi Club Ground, Nairobi

19 February
Scorecard

Argentina; 180 (48 overs)	v	East and Central Africa; 143 (38.1 overs)

Argentina won by 37 runs
Ngara Sports Club, Nairobi

19 February
Scorecard

United States; 145 (45.4 overs)	v	Bangladesh; 147/7 (46 overs)

Bangladesh won by 3 wickets
Jaffery Sports Club, Nairobi

21 February
Scorecard

United States; 337/6 (50 overs)	v	Argentina; 226/6 (50 overs)

United States won by 111 runs
Sir Ali Muslim Club Ground, Nairobi

21 February
Scorecard

Bangladesh; 233/7 (50 overs)	v	United Arab Emirates; 236/4 (46.3 overs)

UAE won by 6 wickets
Ngara Sports Club, Nairobi

=== Group C ===
Team	Pld	W	L	T	NR	Pts	RR
Kenya (H)	4	4	0	0	0	16	2.031
Canada	4	2	1	0	1	10	1.814
Namibia	4	2	2	0	0	8	-0.181
Israel	4	1	3	0	0	4	-1.592
Singapore	4	0	3	0	1	2	-1.414
Source: CricketArchive

12–13 February
Scorecard

Canada; 159/8 (30 overs)	v	Singapore; 50/8 (20.1 overs)

No result
Impala Sports Club, Nairobi

- The match was reduced to 30 overs per side before the start of play.

12–13 February
Scorecard

Israel; 99 (41.4 overs)	v	Kenya; 100/1 (15 overs)

Kenya won by 9 wickets
Premier Club Ground, Nairobi

14 February
Scorecard

Namibia; 51 (16.3 overs)	v	Canada; 52/0 (11.5 overs)

Canada won by 10 wickets
Nairobi Club Ground, Nairobi

14 February
Scorecard

Singapore; 76 (34.5 overs)	v	Kenya; 77/1 (9.2 overs)

Kenya won by 9 wickets
Ruaraka Sports Club, Nairobi

16–17 February
Scorecard

Israel; 89 (29.1 overs)	v	Canada; 90/2 (21.4 overs)

Canada won by 8 wickets
Ruaraka Sports Club, Nairobi

16 February
Scorecard

Singapore; 116 (38 overs)	v	Namibia; 117/5 (32.3 overs)

Namibia won by 5 wickets
Ngara Sports Club, Nairobi

18 February
Scorecard

Singapore; 120 (49.3 overs)	v	Israel; 121/8 (48.2 overs)

Israel won by 2 wickets
Ngara Sports Club, Nairobi

18 February
Scorecard

Kenya; 198 (48.3 overs)	v	Namibia; 178 (49.4 overs)

Kenya won by 20 runs
Simba Union Ground, Nairobi

20 February
Scorecard

Namibia; 257/9 (50 overs)	v	Israel; 198 (47.3 overs)

Namibia won by 59 runs
Impala Sports Club, Nairobi

20 February
Scorecard

Canada; 210/9 (50 overs)	v	Kenya; 213/7 (47 overs)

Kenya won by 3 wickets
Gymkhana Club Ground, Nairobi

=== Group D ===
Team	Pld	W	L	T	NR	Pts	RR
Bermuda	4	4	0	0	0	16	1.369
Hong Kong	4	3	1	0	0	12	2.048
Denmark	4	2	2	0	0	8	0.607
Fiji	4	1	3	0	0	4	-1.062
West Africa	4	0	4	0	0	0	-3.023
Source: CricketArchive

13–14 February
Scorecard

West Africa; 93 (46.3 overs)	v	Bermuda; 94/2 (21.4 overs)

Bermuda won by 8 wickets
Aga Khan Sports Club, Nairobi

13–14 February
Scorecard

Denmark; 192 (46.5 overs)	v	Hong Kong; 192/8 (50 overs)

Hong Kong won by losing fewer wickets
Gymkhana Club Ground, Nairobi

15–16 February
Scorecard

Hong Kong; 154 (47.2 overs)	v	Bermuda; 154/8 (50 overs)

Bermuda won by losing fewer wickets
Jaffery Sports Club, Nairobi

15–16 February
Scorecard

Denmark; 219 (49.3 overs)	v	Fiji; 126 (35.3 overs)

Denmark won by 93 runs
Simba Union Ground, Nairobi

17 February
Scorecard

West Africa; 146 (47.4 overs)	v	Denmark; 147/6 (37.2 overs)

Denmark won by 4 wickets
Premier Club Ground, Nairobi

17 February
Scorecard

Fiji; 126 (35 overs)	v	Hong Kong; 127/3 (17 overs)

Hong Kong won by 7 wickets
Aga Khan Sports Club, Nairobi

19 February
Scorecard

Fiji; 84 (29.4 overs)	v	Bermuda; 85/1 (16 overs)

Bermuda won by 9 wickets
Nairobi Club Ground, Nairobi

19 February
Scorecard

Hong Kong; 355/8 (50 overs)	v	West Africa; 110 (30.5 overs)

Hong Kong won by 245 runs
Sir Ali Muslim Club Ground, Nairobi

21 February
Scorecard

Denmark; 183/7 (50 overs)	v	Bermuda; 185/4 (43.5 overs)

Bermuda won by 6 wickets
Ruaraka Sports Club, Nairobi

21 February
Scorecard

Fiji; 232/9 (50 overs)	v	West Africa; 88 (39.1 overs)

Fiji won by 144 runs
Jaffery Sports Club, Nairobi

== Second round ==
=== Group E ===
Team	Pld	W	L	T	NR	Pts	RR
Kenya	3	3	0	0	0	12	1.371
Netherlands	3	2	1	0	0	8	1.196
Bangladesh	3	1	2	0	0	4	-0.020
Hong Kong	3	0	3	0	0	0	-2.504
Source: CricketArchive

23 February
Scorecard

Netherlands; 205 (48.3 overs)	v	Bangladesh; 158 (48 overs)

Netherlands won by 47 runs
Premier Club Ground, Nairobi
Player of the match: Huib Visée (Neth)

23 February
Scorecard

Hong Kong; 86 (33.1 overs)	v	Kenya; 90/2 (16 overs)

Kenya won by 8 wickets
Gymkhana Club Ground, Nairobi
Player of the match: Alfred Njuguna (Ken)

25 February
Scorecard

Netherlands; 288/8 (50 overs)	v	Hong Kong; 154 (41.1 overs)

Netherlands won by 134 runs
Nairobi Club Ground, Nairobi
Player of the match: Nolan Clarke (Neth)

25 February
Scorecard

Kenya; 295/6 (50 overs)	v	Bangladesh; 282/8 (50 overs)

Kenya won by 13 runs
Simba Union Ground, Nairobi
Player of the match: Maurice Odumbe (Ken)

27 February
Scorecard

Bangladesh; 238/8 (50 overs)	v	Hong Kong; 181 (48.5 overs)

Bangladesh won by 57 runs
Aga Khan Sports Club, Nairobi
Player of the match: Minhajul Abedin (Ban)

27 February
Scorecard

Netherlands; 250/8 (50 overs)	v	Kenya; 251/8 (49.5 overs)

Kenya won by 2 wickets
Ruaraka Sports Club, Nairobi
Player of the match: Steve Tikolo (Ken)

=== Group F ===
Team	Pld	W	L	T	NR	Pts	RR
United Arab Emirates	3	3	0	0	0	12	0.488
Bermuda	3	2	1	0	0	8	0.669
Canada	3	1	2	0	0	4	-0.402
Ireland	3	0	3	0	0	0	-0.701
Source: CricketArchive

23 February
Scorecard

Canada; 149 (43.2 overs)	v	Bermuda; 151/2 (34.5 overs)

Bermuda won by 8 wickets
Simba Union Ground, Nairobi
Player of the match: Noel Gibbons (Ber)

23 February
Scorecard

United Arab Emirates; 295/4 (50 overs)	v	Ireland; 236/9 (50 overs)

UAE won by 59 runs
Ruaraka Sports Club, Nairobi
Player of the match: Mazhar Hussain (UAE)

25 February
Scorecard

Ireland; 202 (48.4 overs)	v	Bermuda; 206/3 (45.5 overs)

Bermuda won by 7 wickets
Gymkhana Club Ground, Nairobi
Player of the match: Clay Smith (Ber)

25 February
Scorecard

Canada; 278/7 (50 overs)	v	United Arab Emirates; 279/9 (49.2 overs)

UAE won by 1 wicket
Aga Khan Sports Club, Nairobi
Player of the match: Azhar Saeed (UAE)

27 February
Scorecard

Bermuda; 329/9 (50 overs)	v	United Arab Emirates; 330/9 (48.4 overs)

UAE won by 1 wicket
Nairobi Club Ground, Nairobi
Player of the match: Saleem Raza (UAE)

27 February
Scorecard

Ireland; 212/7 (50 overs)	v	Canada; 213/5 (46 overs)

Canada won by 5 wickets
Premier Club Ground, Nairobi
Player of the match: Mark Cohen (Ire)

== Finals ==
=== Semi-finals ===
Of the four semi-finalists, Kenya and the Netherlands had made the semi-finals at the previous tournament in 1990, Bermuda had last made the semi-finals at the 1986 tournament, and the United Arab Emirates were making their tournament debut.

1 March
Scorecard

Kenya; 318/5 (50 overs)	v	Bermuda; 254/9 (50 overs)
Maurice Odumbe 158*; Clevie Wade 1/46		Clay Smith 108; Steve Tikolo 3/49

Kenya won by 64 runs
Aga Khan Sports Club, Nairobi
Player of the match: Maurice Odumbe (Ken)

- Kenya won the toss and elected to bat.

3 March
Scorecard

Netherlands; 194 (48.3 overs)	v	United Arab Emirates; 195/4 (44.4 overs)
Tim de Leede 52; Sohail Butt 3/20		Mohammad Ishaq 72*; Floris Jansen 2/43

UAE won by 6 wickets
Nairobi Club Ground, Nairobi
Player of the match: Saleem Raza (UAE)

- UAE won the toss and elected to field.

=== Third-place play-off ===
The third-place play-off determined the twelfth and final team at the 1996 World Cup.

5 March
Scorecard

Netherlands; 306/2 (50 overs)	v	Bermuda; 203 (42.2 overs)
Nolan Clarke 121*; Pacer Edwards 1/67		Dexter Smith 39; Floris Jansen 3/61

Netherlands won by 103 runs
Simba Union Ground, Nairobi
Player of the match: Steven Lubbers (Neth)

- Bermuda won the toss and elected to field.

=== Final ===
6 March
Scorecard

Kenya; 281/6 (50 overs)	v	United Arab Emirates; 282/8 (49.1 overs)
Maurice Odumbe 86; Saleem Raza 2/48		Riaz Poonawala 71; Martin Suji 4/61

UAE won by 2 wickets
Ruaraka Sports Club, Nairobi
Player of the match: Mohammad Ishaq (UAE)

- UAE won the toss and elected to field.
- UAE won the 1994 ICC Trophy.

== Plate competition ==
The plate competition was contested by the teams finishing third and fourth in each first-round group.

=== Group G ===
Team	Pld	W	L	T	NR	Pts	RR
Papua New Guinea	3	3	0	0	0	12	0.548
Namibia	3	2	1	0	0	8	1.226
Argentina	3	1	2	0	0	4	-0.759
Fiji	3	0	3	0	0	0	-0.941
Source: CricketArchive

=== Group H ===
Team	Pld	W	L	T	NR	Pts	RR
United States	3	3	0	0	0	12	2.466
Denmark	3	2	1	0	0	8	1.003
Malaysia	3	1	2	0	0	4	-0.571
Israel	3	0	3	0	0	0	-2.717
Source: CricketArchive

== Wooden spoon competition ==
Team	Pld	W	L	T	NR	Pts	RR
West Africa	3	3	0	0	0	12	1.843
East and Central Africa	3	2	1	0	0	8	0.469
Singapore	3	1	2	0	0	4	-0.615
Gibraltar	3	0	3	0	0	0	-1.727
Source: CricketArchive

The wooden spoon competition was contested by the teams finishing last in each first-round group.

23 February
Scorecard

East and Central Africa; 266/8 (50 overs)	v	Singapore; 225/9 (50 overs)

East and Central Africa won by 41 runs
Nairobi Club Ground, Nairobi

23 February
Scorecard

West Africa; 214 (48 overs)	v	Gibraltar; 61 (27.1 overs)

West Africa won by 153 runs
Aga Khan Sports Club, Nairobi

25 February
Scorecard

East and Central Africa; 123 (36.3 overs)	v	West Africa; 124/4 (34 overs)

West Africa won by 6 wickets
Premier Club Ground, Nairobi

25 February
Scorecard

Gibraltar; 227/9 (50 overs)	v	Singapore; 231/6 (49.5 overs)

Singapore won by 4 wickets
Ruaraka Sports Club, Nairobi

23 February
Scorecard

Gibraltar; 170 (49.2 overs)	v	East and Central Africa; 174/2 (29.4 overs)

East and Central Africa won by 8 wickets
Gymkhana Club Ground, Nairobi

23 February
Scorecard

West Africa; 219 (50 overs)	v	Singapore; 163 (43.4 overs)

West Africa won by 56 runs
Simba Union Ground, Nairobi

== Statistics ==
=== Most runs ===
The top five run scorers (total runs) are included in this table, ordered by runs, then by batting average, and then alphabetically.

Player	Team	Runs	Inns	Avg	Highest	100s	50s
Nolan Clarke	Netherlands	517	9	86.16	121*	3	1
Dexter Smith	Bermuda	392	9	56.00	110	1	2
Maurice Odumbe	Kenya	391	7	65.16	158*	2	1
Clay Smith	Bermuda	391	9	55.85	108	1	3
Azhar Saeed	United Arab Emirates	370	9	52.85	126*	1	2

Source: CricketArchive

=== Most wickets ===
The top five wicket takers are listed in this table, listed by wickets taken and then by bowling average.

Player	Team	Overs	Wkts	Ave	SR	Econ	Best
Gavin Murgatroyd	Namibia	49.5	19	10.26	15.73	3.91	4/31
Fred Arua	Papua New Guinea	63.2	19	10.52	20.00	3.15	5/31
Ole Mortensen	Denmark	62.4	18	8.22	20.88	2.36	7/19
Stewart Brew	Hong Kong	54.0	18	13.22	18.00	4.40	4/16
Pacer Edwards	Bermuda	81.0	18	18.61	27.00	4.13	5/27

Source: CricketArchive

== See also ==
- ICC Trophy
- 1996 Cricket World Cup
