= Naankuse Foundation Wildlife Sanctuary =

Wildlife sanctuary in central Namibia

- Location within Namibia
- Location: Namibia
- Coordinates: 22°22′50″S 17°22′35″E
- Area: 10,000 ha (39 sq mi)
- Established: 2007
- Governing body: Naankuse Foundation
- Website: www.naankuse.com

The Naankuse Foundation Wildlife Sanctuary (Juǀʼhoan: Nǀaʼankusê) is a wildlife sanctuary in central Namibia, situated c. 42 kilometres (26 mi) outside Windhoek. Besides the sanctuary the establishment also runs a carnivore conservation research programme, the Clever Cubs pre-primary school, and a clinic for the San people. Nǀaʼankusê is a Juǀʼhoan word that means "God will protect us", or "God watches over us." The sanctuary opened in 2007. It is run by Namibian conservationist Marlice van Vuuren and her husband Rudie van Vuuren. Naankuse is funded by voluntary donations and relies on the time of volunteers to continue its projects.

The Naankuse Foundation is based on a 10,000 hectare nature reserve. In January 2011, Brad Pitt and Angelina Jolie chose Naankuse to become a partner of the Shiloh Jolie-Pitt Foundation, in honour of their Namibian-born daughter. "We have known Rudie and Marlice for many years and continue to be impressed by their hard work and dedication to the people and conservation of the land and wildlife of Namibia. The new section of the project will be under Naankuse and in Shiloh's name. We want her to be very involved and grow up with the understanding of her country of birth," Jolie said.

== Carnivore conservation tracking ==
Naankuse started a carnivore research project in early 2008 to help protect and conserve large wild carnivores and reduce human-wildlife conflict. Captured cats are fitted with a radio collar before being released back into the wild allowing Naankuse to track their movements, check on their condition and gain a better understanding of their ecology for future conservation. The project also works to relocate proven problem animals (those that prey on farmers' cattle) to safer conservation areas and reduce the number needlessly shot or killed. The project is the first of its kind to monitor translocated and released carnivores on a continuous and intensive basis.

The project aims to:

- Find a sustainable and successful solution for re-locating problem animals, i.e., proven livestock predators, so they are no longer shot and killed.
- Re-establish a cheetah population in Namibrand Nature reserve and Namib Naukluft, which currently have very low cheetah populations.
- Develop footprint identification software for cheetah, which will be free for use and enable cost effective, standardised population monitoring. Naankuse have worked with Chester Zoo and WildTrack! on this initiative.
- Enable farmers to manage and protect their livestock from predators by creating GIS (Geographic Information System) maps of locations of collared carnivores.
- Work closely with farmers to dispel the myth that all cheetahs and leopards are a danger to livestock, helping to protect these big cats from indiscriminate shooting and conserve the species.

== Wildlife sanctuary ==
The wildlife sanctuary accommodates orphaned and injured animals that cannot be released safely back into the wild including leopards, lions, cheetah, wild dogs and baboons all housed in purpose-built enclosures.

N/'an ku sê has been repeatedly investigated by the Namibian Ministry of Environment, Forestry and Tourism for permit violations and illegal breeding and translocating of wild animals, particularly cheetahs and elephants. When confronted with the allegations, Rudie van Vuuren denied the claims and accused the ministry of incompetence.

== Pre-school ==
The Clever Cubs School opened in November 2009 to provide free pre-primary education for the San children on the farm. The school currently has nearly 30 pupils ranging from under 1 to 15 years old. Naankuse also work to secure places at mainstream schools in Windhoek for the older children. Naankuse's work with the San community is voluntarily funded and relies on donations from supporters and uptake of their "sponsor-a-child" scheme to continue.

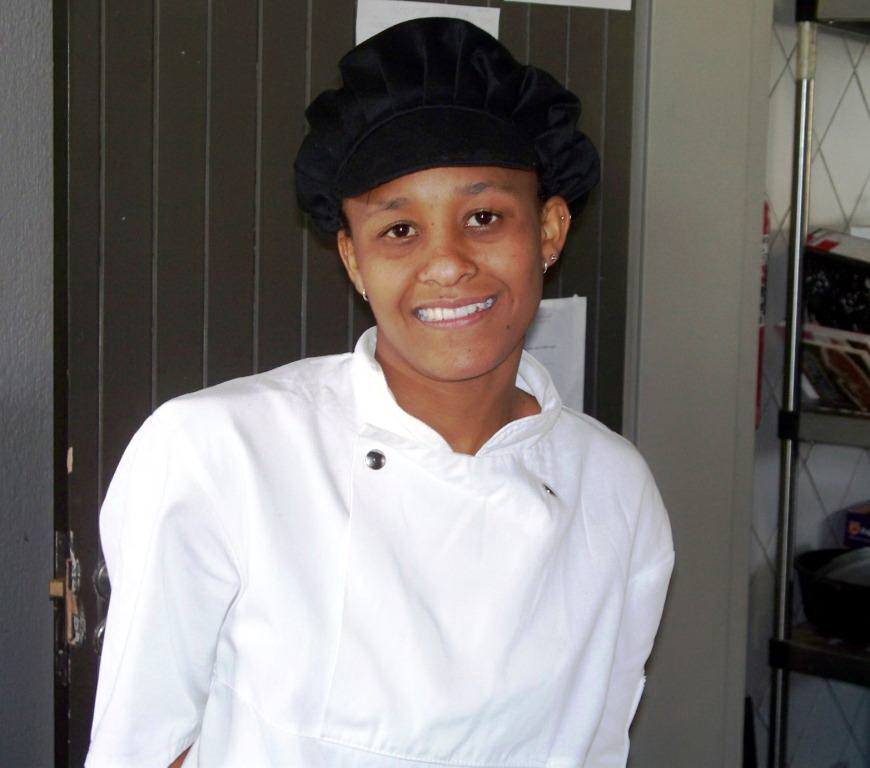
Award winning San chef, Lientjie

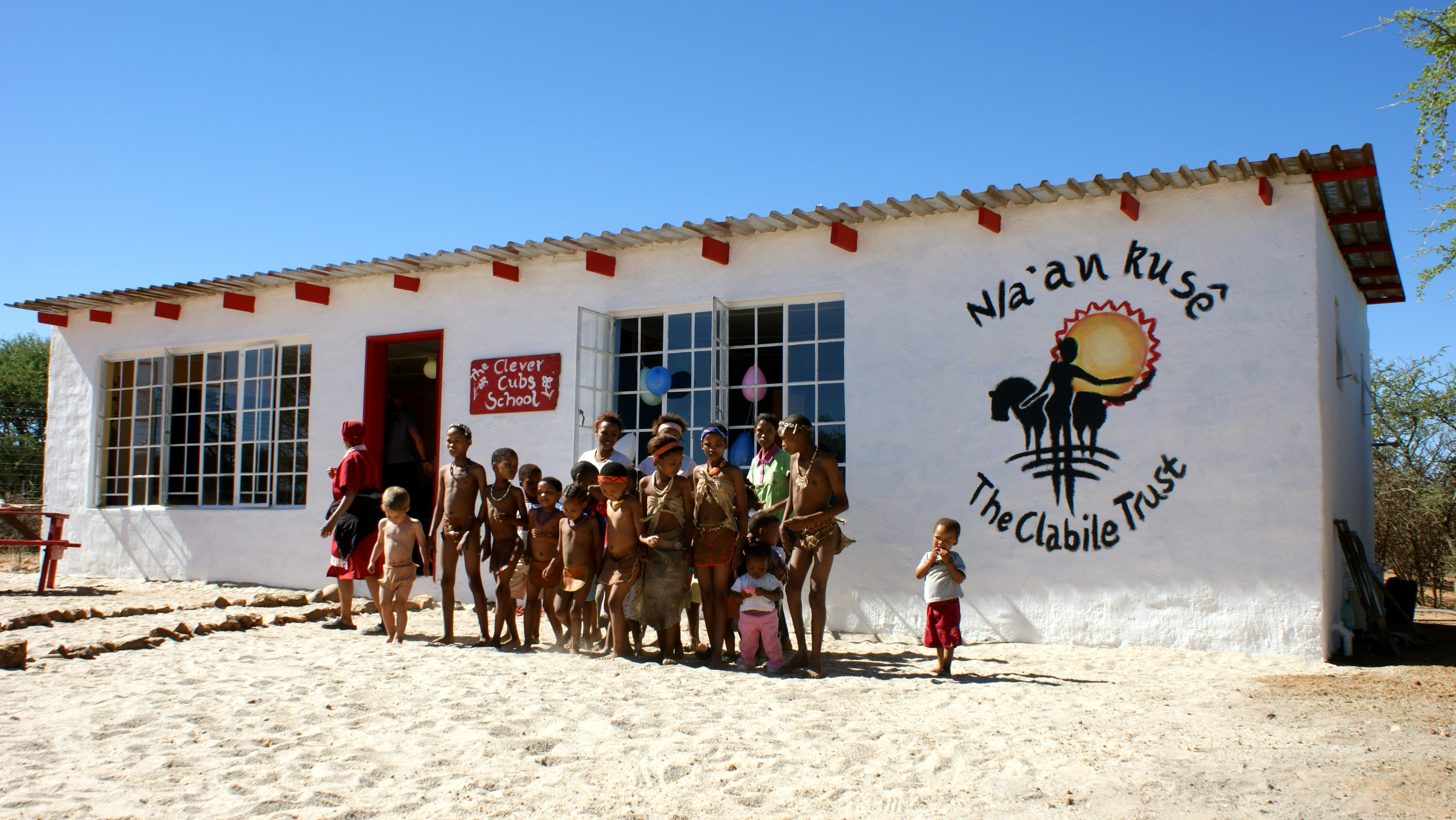
Clever Cubs School

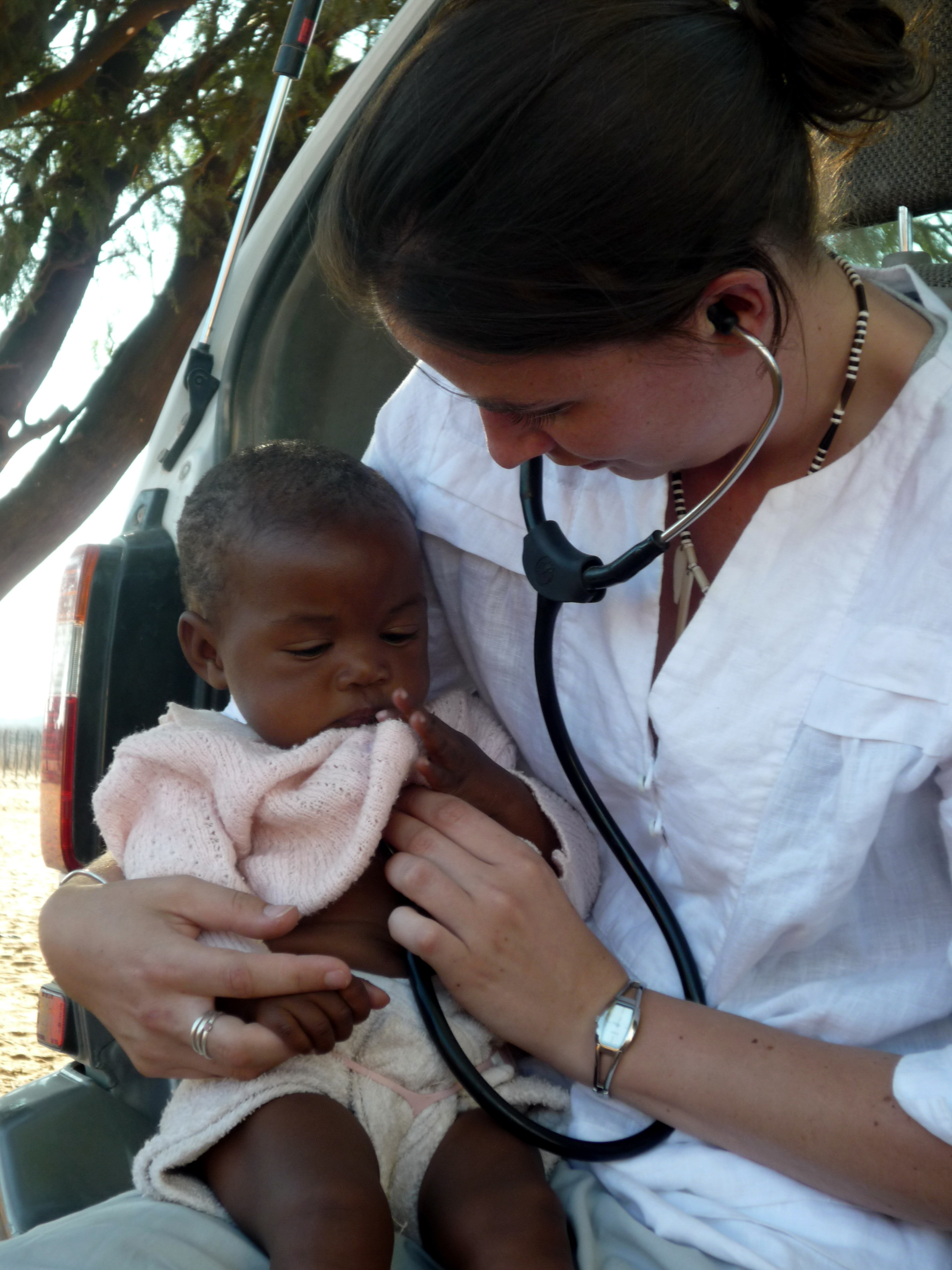
Doctor examining a patient at Naankuse Lifeline Clinic

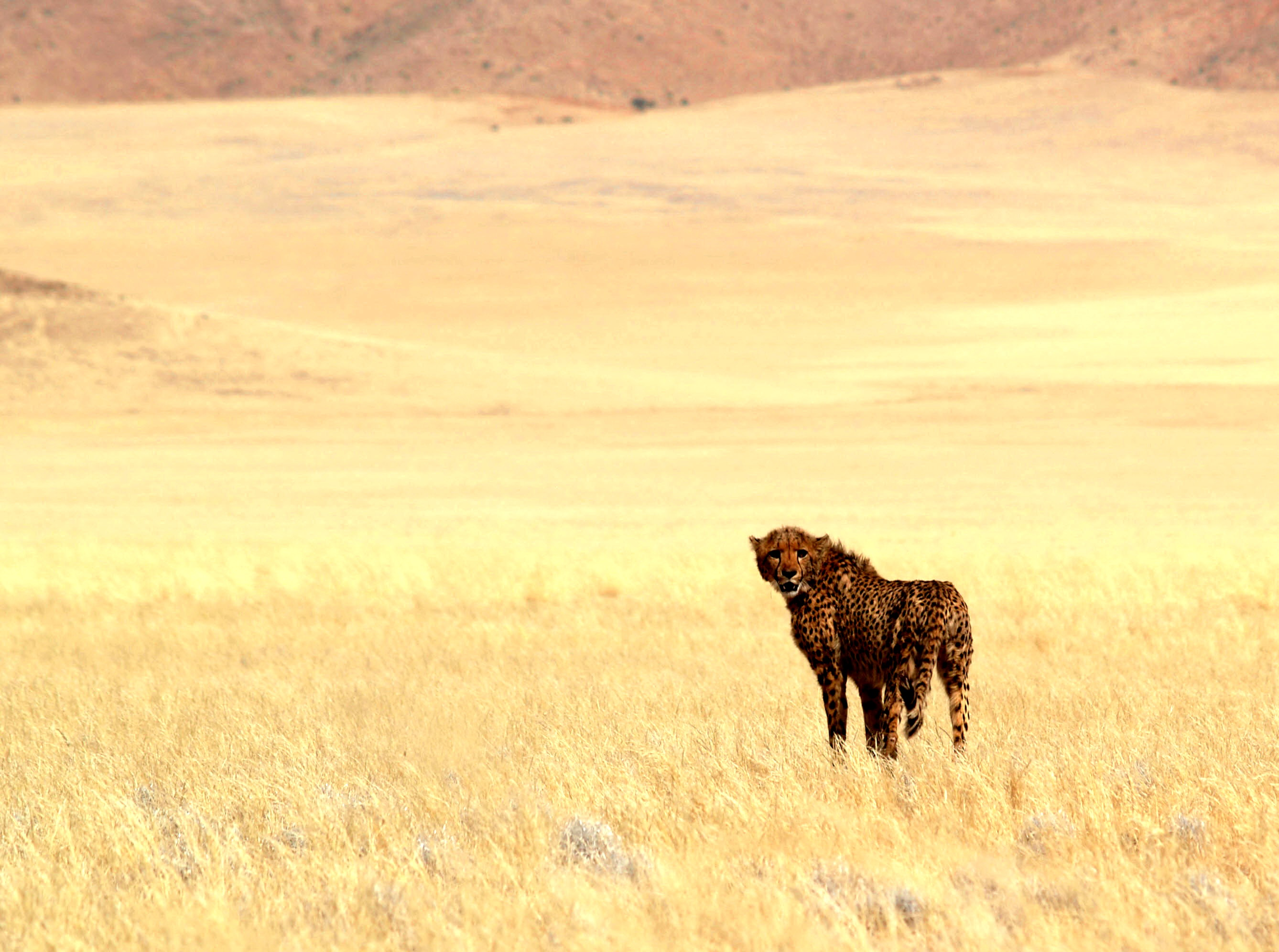
Cheetah release, Sossusvlei

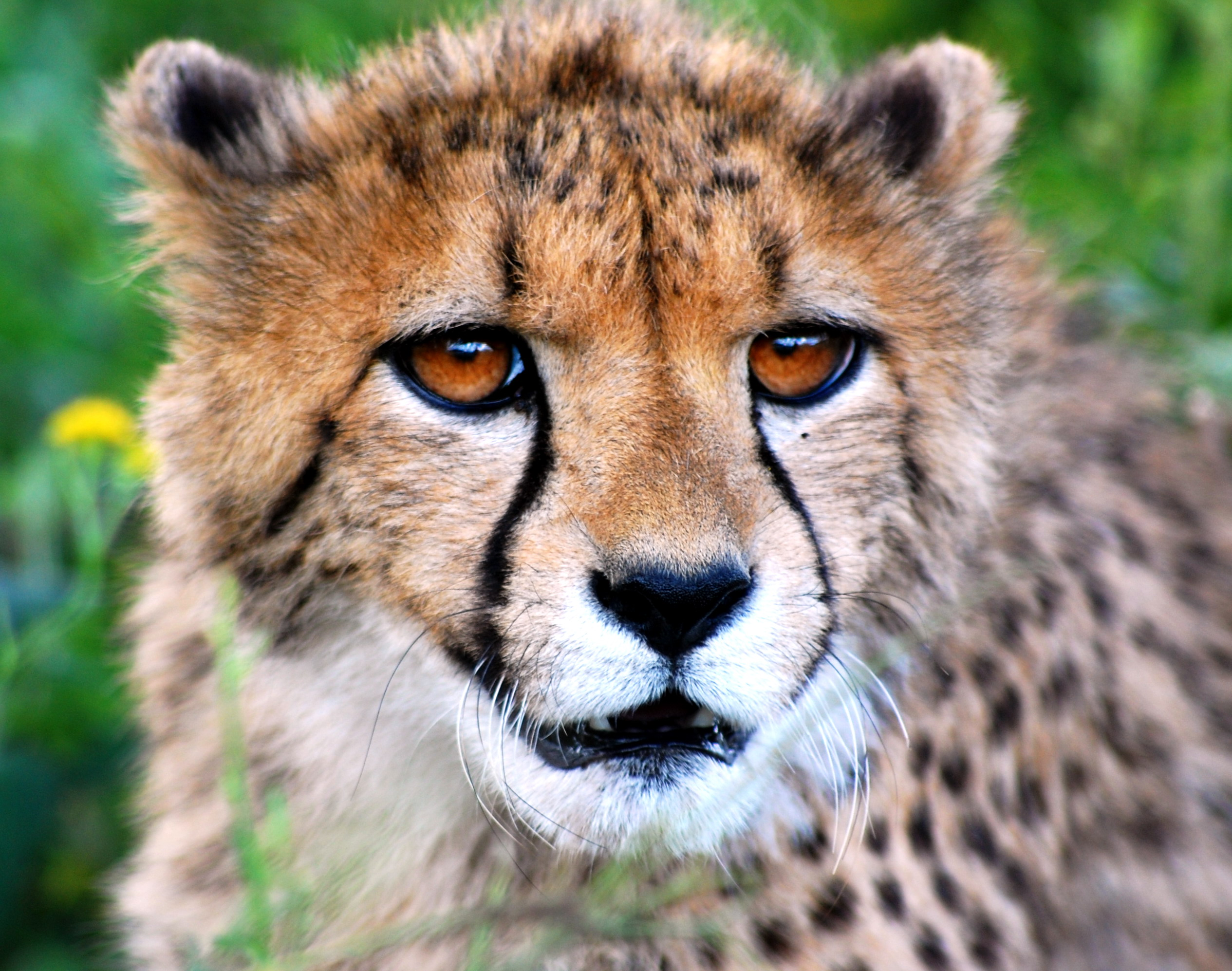
Lucky, the three legged cheetah

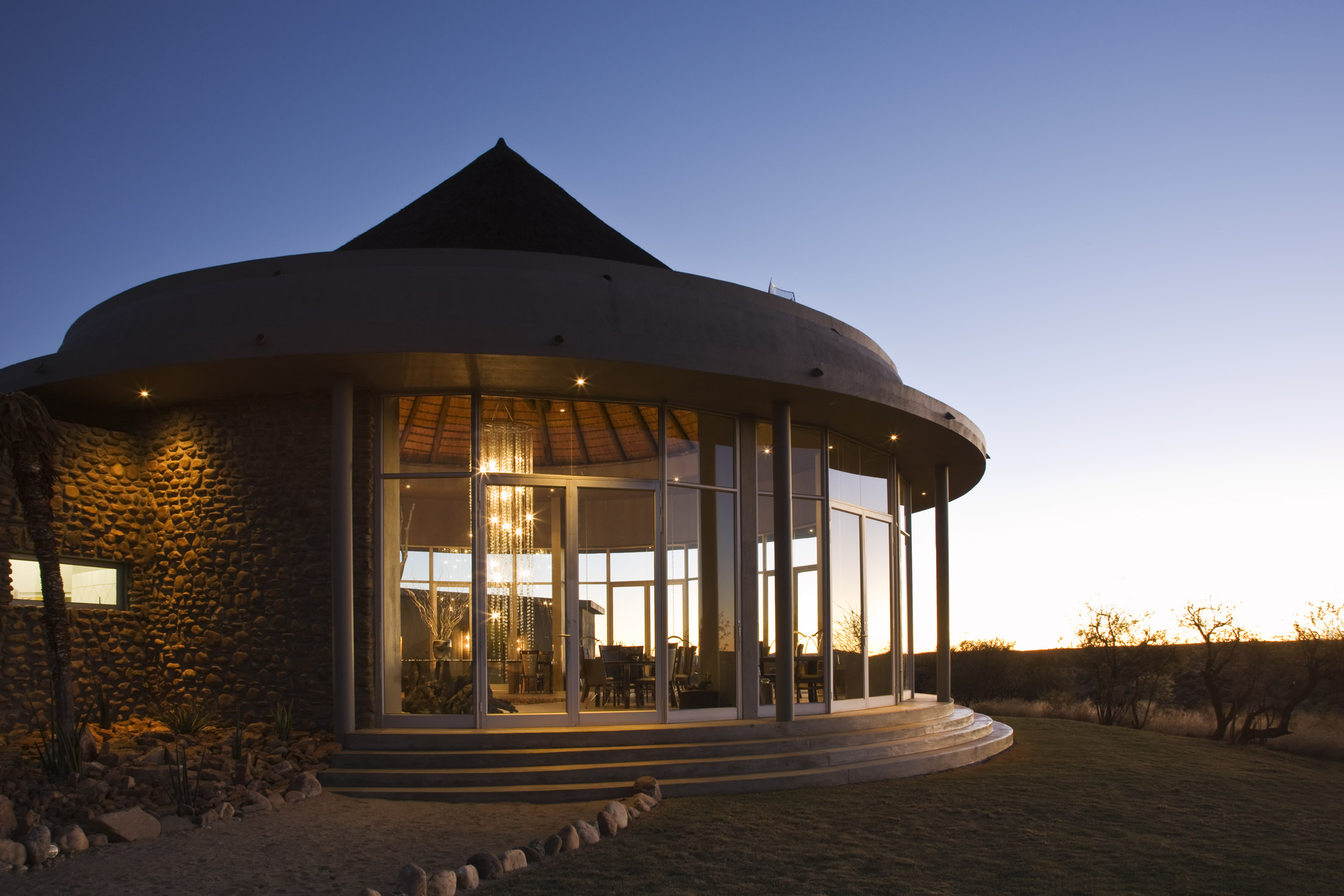
The lodge

== Film and photography portfolio ==
Naankuse, its owner Marlice van Vuuren and the animals have featured in a number of documentaries, films and photographs. Naankuse and their three legged cheetah Lucky, featured in an advert for a Volkswagen Golf, shown on South African TV in May 2009.
