= Jadhavji Bhimji =

Kenyan cricketer (born 1983)

Personal information
- Born: 28 June 1983 (age 43); India

International information
- National side: Kenya
- Source: Cricinfo, 25 November 2019

Jadhavji Bhimji (born 28 June 1983) is a Kenyan cricketer. He made his first-class debut for Kenya, against Zimbabwe A, in December 2001. He then played in two more first-class matches for Kenya in the 2004 ICC Intercontinental Cup. He made his List A debut for Kenya, also against Zimbabwe A, in the 2002 ICC Six Nations Challenge tournament in April 2002. In November 2019, he was named in Kenya's squad for the Cricket World Cup Challenge League B tournament in Oman.
