= Sabine Kuegler =

German author (born 1972)

Sabine Kuegler (born 25 December 1972 in Patan, Nepal) is a German author. She has written several books, two of which have been translated into English. These two books are related to her uncommon childhood: from age 7 to age 17 she lived with her parents and two siblings in the jungle of Waropen, Papua in Indonesia, with the remote tribe of the Fayu.

Her parents were the first whites to live with the newly discovered tribe of about 400 people, who hunted with bow and arrow, ate snakes, insects and worms, and practiced intertribal warfare and revenge killings. The Kueglers were there to study the tribe's language. Her mother, trained as a nurse, performed midwife duties with the tribe. At age 17, Sabine Kuegler left and attended a Swiss boarding school. She is divorced and has four children. Her parents have returned to Germany.

Her best-selling first book Dschungelkind (Jungle Child) (Droemer Knaur, München 2005, ISBN 3-426-27361-6) describes her experiences in the two different cultures and her occasional nostalgia for the simpler, slower life of the tribe. An English translation (Jungle Child, ISBN 1-84408-261-X) appeared in the same year and a German film adaptation in 2011. Her second book, Ruf des Dschungels (Call of the Jungle) (Droemer Knaur, München 2006, ISBN 3-426-27393-4) describes a visit to the Fayu that she undertook in late 2005. A third book, "Jäger und Gejagte" (Hunter and prey) describes her experiences living in Europe.

The German group Gesellschaft für bedrohte Völker criticized her first book, claiming that it romanticized the life of the Fayu and pointing out that it failed to mention the human rights violations of the Indonesian government against West Papuan people, and their endangerment by clearing of the jungle and industrial projects. In her second book and in public appearances, Sabine Kuegler was able to emphasize these political issues, her parents having left West Papua in 2006, enabling her to go public with her political activities. She has aimed to be a spokesperson for the threatened Fayu.

== See also ==
- Tippi Degré
- Marlice van Vuuren
