= Tippi Degré =

French documentary maker

Tippi Benjamine Okanti Degré
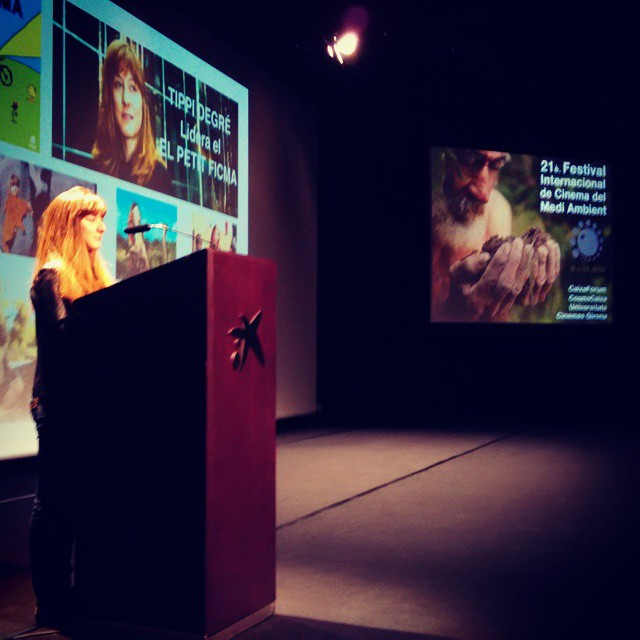
- Degré at 2014 SUNCINE, oldest International Environmental Film Festival, Barcelona - Spain
- Born: 4 June 1990 (age 36); Windhoek, Namibia

Tippi Benjamine Okanti Degré (born 4 June 1990) is a French woman best known for spending her youth in Namibia among wild animals and the local tribes. In 1997, she was the protagonist of Le Monde selon Tippi, filmed in Namibia and Botswana. When she was 10, Degré wrote Tippi: My Book of Africa. In 2002–03, she was the presenter of Around the World with Tippi, six wildlife and environmental TV documentaries.

== Biography ==
Tippi Degré was born in Windhoek, Namibia, to wildlife photographer-filmmaker parents and was raised in the bush for the first ten years of her life in Southern Africa. She was named after the American actress Tippi Hedren as well as friend of her parents Gert Benjamin Jordaan, a guide they knew in Namibia at the time of Tippi's birth. During her childhood in Namibia, Degré befriended animals she lived among including a 28-year old elephant Abu, a leopard nicknamed J&B, lions, giraffes, a banded mongoose, an ostrich, meerkats, a cheetah, a caracal, snakes, a giant bullfrog and chameleons. In addition, she also got along with the local Indigenous peoples and dressed like them.

In 2000, Degré wrote the novel Tippi: My Book of Africa, based on her life in Namibia, Botswana, South Africa, Zimbabwe and Madagascar where she lived among wild animals and with tribes people, the San Bushmen and the Himbas.

In 2001, she was named the Godmother of the World Wide Fund for Nature (WWF) with the French actor, producer and director Jacques Perrin. From 2002 to 2003, Degré presented six wildlife and environmental TV documentaries for the Discovery Channel.

A documentary film on her experiences, Le Monde Selon Tippi ("The World According to Tippi") was released in 1997. Around the World with Tippi was released in 2004, directed by Jeanne Mascolo de Filippis.

Degré studied cinema and audiovisuals in France. Active in conservation and in the documentary film industry, she is a speaker and is currently the director of "El Petit FICMA," the children's section of the FICMA International Environmental Film Festival (Barcelona).

== See also ==
- Marlice van Vuuren
- Sabine Kuegler

== Bibliography ==
- Degré, Tippi; Robert, Sylvie; Degré, Alain (2005). Tippi: My Book of Africa. Cape Town: Struik. ISBN 1-77007-029-X.
