= Mark Cohen (cricketer) =

Irish cricketer (born 1961)

Personal information
- Full name: Mark Francis Cohen
- Born: 27 March 1961 (age 65); Cork, Ireland
- Batting: Right-handed
- Bowling: Right-arm medium

Career statistics
Competition	First-class	List A
Matches	10	6
Runs scored	320	155
Batting average	18.82	25.83
100s/50s	0/1	0/1
Top score	60	66
Balls bowled	6	–
Wickets	0	–
Bowling average	–	–
5 wickets in innings	–	–
10 wickets in match	–	–
Best bowling	–	–
Catches/stumpings	4/–	2/–
- Source: CricketArchive, 30 December 2021

Mark Francis Cohen (born 27 March 1961) is a former Irish cricketer. A right-handed batsman and right-arm medium pace bowler, he made his debut for Ireland against Wales in July 1980 and went on to play for Ireland on 69 occasions, his last match coming against Canada in the 1994 ICC Trophy.

Of his 69 matches for Ireland, ten had first-class status, all of which were against Scotland and six had List A status, all of which were NatWest Trophy first round matches.

He scored two centuries for Ireland, the best being 118 in a two-day match against Sussex in July 1987. He bowled just once for Ireland, a maiden over against Scotland in June 1993.
