= Stanley Marisa =

Zimbabwean cricketer (born 1985)

Personal information
- Full name: Stanley Chikomborero Marisa
- Born: 18 November 1985 (age 40); Chiredzi, Zimbabwe
- Batting: Left-handed
- Bowling: Left-arm orthodox

Domestic team information
- Years: Team
- 2011–2012: Southern Rocks
- Source: CricketArchive, 5 August 2016

Stanley Chikomborero Marisa (born 18 November 1985) is a Zimbabwean cricketer who has played for the Southern Rocks in Zimbabwean domestic cricket. He is a left-arm orthodox bowler.

Marisa was born in Chiredzi, Masvingo Province. At the age of 16, he was selected in the Zimbabwe under-19s squad for the 2002 Under-19 World Cup in New Zealand. He played in all eight of his team's matches, and took eight wickets with a best of 2/14 against Kenya. A few months after the World Cup, Marisa was selected to play for Zimbabwe A in the 2002 ICC Six Nations Challenge, hosted by Namibia. He appeared in three games (all of which held List A status), but took only a single wicket, 1/45 against the Netherlands. Marisa was re-included in the national under-19 team for the 2004 Under-19 World Cup in Bangladesh, but made only two appearances. However, he did take 3/36 against New Zealand in his team's final game of the tournament. Despite his earlier international appearances, Marisa did not make his debut in senior Zimbabwean domestic cricket until the 2011–12 season. He played three first-class games and two limited-overs games for the Southern Rocks, but had little success in either format.
