= Marlice van Vuuren =

Namibian conservationist

- Born: Marlice Elrethra van der Merwe; 4 May 1976 (age 50)
- Occupation: Conservationist
- Spouse: Rudie van Vuuren

Marlice Elretha Jansen van Vuuren (born 14 May 1976 as Marlice Elrethra van der Merwe) is a Namibian conservationist. Together with her husband Dr. Rudie van Vuuren, she runs the N/a’an ku sê Wildlife Sanctuary in central Namibia.

Van Vuuren has been working with animals in film productions since the age of 13; she has worked on a number of well known movies with various celebrities including Angelina Jolie. Her life is covered in the 2008 documentary "Marlice – A Vision for Africa" by Philip Selkirk. Marlice van Vuuren and her three legged cheetah Lucky featured in an advert for a Volkswagen Golf, shown on South African TV in May 2009.

== Family ==
Marlice van Vuuren grew up on her parents' farm in Namibia where for more than 30 years injured or orphaned animals have found refuge. She also grew up closely with the San people, and is one of only a handful of European people who can speak one of the San language dialects. She married Dr. Rudie van Vuuren in December 2000 with whom she has two children.

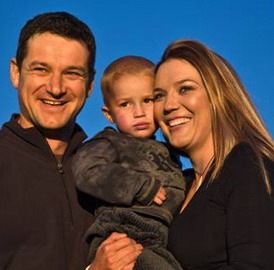
Marlice & Rudie van Vuuren with their son, Zacheo

== See also ==
- Tippi Degré
- Sabine Kuegler
