= Jeff Thomas (cricketer) =

Australian cricketer

Personal information
- Full name: Jeffrey Mark Thomas
- Born: 19 October 1971 (age 55); Toowoomba, Queensland, Australia
- Batting: Right-handed
- Role: Opening batsman

Domestic team information
- Years: Team
- 1994: Queensland

Head coaching information
- Years: Team
- 1999–2002: Canada
- Source: CricketArchive, 2 April 2016

Jeffrey Mark Thomas (born 19 October 1971) is a former Australian cricketer who represented Queensland in Australian domestic cricket as a right-handed opening batsman. He later took up coaching, and served as coach of the Canadian national team from 1999 to 2002.

Born in Toowoomba, Queensland, Thomas made his first-class debut in January 1994, in a Sheffield Shield match against Western Australia. In a Mercantile Mutual Cup game against the same team a few days later, he scored 71 runs from 125 balls opening the batting with Trevor Barsby. He and Stuart Law put on 187 runs for the third wicket, setting a new Queensland List A record. Thomas made another three appearances for Queensland during the 1993–94 season – Shield matches against Tasmania and Victoria, and a Mercantile Mutual Cup fixture against South Australia. He never regained his place in the team, but continued to play for the state second XI for several more seasons.

Beginning in 1995, Thomas served as a player-coach for the Toronto Cricket, Skating and Curling Club, a club in Canada's Toronto and District Cricket Association. In 1999, he was appointed coach of the Canadian national team, with his first tournament in charge being the 1999–2000 Red Stripe Bowl. He also had responsible for the national under-19 team, which he coached at the 2002 Under-19 World Cup. At the 2001 ICC Trophy, Canada placed third to qualify for the 2003 World Cup (their first World Cup in 24 years). However, two months before the event, in December 2002, Thomas was unexpectedly sacked and replaced by Gus Logie. His sacking was said to be the subject of "disharmony between the players and the Canadian Cricket Association", and he went on to sue the Canadian Cricket Association for wrongful dismissal.
