= Aga Khan Sports Club Ground =

Cricket ground in Nairobi, Kenya

Coordinates: 1.260499°S 36.823935°E

- Interactive map of Aga Khan Sports Club Ground

Ground information
- Location: Nairobi
- Country: Kenya
- Establishment: 2012
- Capacity: n/a
- Owner: Aga Khan Sports Club
- Operator: Aga Khan Sports Club
- Tenants: Aga Khan Sports Club
- End names
- n/a

International information
- First men's ODI: 2 October 1996: Kenya v Pakistan
- Last men's ODI: 16 October 1997: Kenya v Zimbabwe
- As of 5 September 2008; Source

The Aga Khan Sports Club Ground is a cricket ground in Nairobi, Kenya. The ground is used by Aga Khan Sports Club cricket team. The pitch is considered to be one of the fastest in Kenya, and the venue hosted four One Day Internationals between 1996 and 1997.

Kenya have played first-class matches here against Pakistan A and Namibia, and eight matches were played here during the 1994 ICC Trophy.

== ODI's Hosted ==
Team (A)	Team (B)	Winner	Margin	Year
Kenya	Pakistan	Pakistan	By 4 wickets	1996
Bangladesh	Zimbabwe	Zimbabwe	By 172 runs	1997
Kenya	Bangladesh	Kenya	By 8 wickets	1997
Kenya	Zimbabwe	Zimbabwe	By 7 wickets	1997

== List of Five Wicket Hauls ==
=== One Day Internationals ===
No.	Bowler	Date	Team	Opposing team	Inn	Overs	Runs	Wkts	Econ	Batsmen	Result
1	Bryan Strang	14 October 1997	Zimbabwe	Bangladesh	2	10	26	6	2.60	Shahriar Hossain; Habibul Bashar; Athar Ali Khan; Jahangir Alam; Akram Khan; Khaled Mashud	Won
