= Rudie van Vuuren =

Namibian physician, conservationist and sportsman

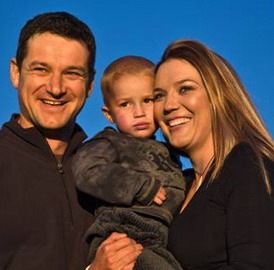
- van Vuuren with his family

Personal information
- Full name: Rudolf Jansen van Vuuren
- Born: 20 September 1972 (age 54); Windhoek, South West Africa (now Namibia)
- Batting: Right-handed
- Bowling: Right-arm fast-medium
- Role: Bowler

International information
- National side: Namibia (1997–2004)
- ODI debut (cap 13): 16 February 2003 v Pakistan
- Last ODI: 3 March 2003 v Netherlands

Career statistics
Competition	ODI	LA
Matches	5	21
Runs scored	26	60
Batting average	8.66	8.57
100s/50s	0/0	0/0
Top score	14	14*
Balls bowled	300	1,038
Wickets	8	28
Bowling average	37.25	30.14
5 wickets in innings	1	1
10 wickets in match	0	0
Best bowling	5/43	5/43
Catches/stumpings	0/–	4/–
- Source: ESPNcricinfo, 22 June 2017

Rudolf Jansen van Vuuren (born 20 September 1972) is a Namibian physician, conservationist and former sportsman who specialised in both cricket and rugby union.

He was a part of the Namibian rugby union squads for the 1999 Rugby World Cup and 2003 Rugby World Cup. He also played in five matches out of the six matches during Namibia's 2003 Cricket World Cup campaign and opened the bowling in all the five matches he played. He is the first sportsman from any country to feature in both Cricket World Cup and Rugby World Cup.

He is also a qualified medical doctor as well as an obstetrician and he has been treating HIV/AIDS patients. He has been at the forefront in fighting against HIV/AIDS in Namibia which is considered as a serious concern in the nation which has an estimated population of around 2.5 million. He most notably helped to deliver 70 babies in his clinic in Windhoek all within the space of just eight months between the 2003 Cricket World Cup and 2003 Rugby World Cup. He is also currently serving as the President of Cricket Namibia since 2018.

== Biography ==
He was born in Windhoek, South West Africa (now Namibia), but was raised up in South Africa. Rudie van Vuuren married Namibian conservationist Marlice van Vuuren in December 2000. Together, they run N/a’an ku sê Wildlife Sanctuary. He is the personal physician of the President of Namibia, Dr Hage Geingob.

He qualified as a doctor in the early 1990s at the Stellenbosch University in South Africa and he also played rugby at the Stellenbosch University. His younger brother Pieter van Vuuren is also a rugby union player.

== Sports career ==
van Vuuren is best known for representing his country Namibia in both the 2003 Cricket World Cup and the 2003 Rugby Union World Cup; as a result he became the first and only man to compete in two different sporting codes, cricket and rugby union in World Cups in the same calendar year.

He was named in the Namibian cricket squad for the 1997 ICC Trophy. He also played for Namibia at the 2001 ICC Trophy. He was also part of the Namibian squad for the 2002 ICC Six Nations Challenge and 2004 ICC Six Nations Challenge.

=== 1999 Rugby World Cup ===
He made his maiden Rugby World Cup appearance as a reserve fly-half during the 1999 Rugby World Cup campaign in Australia which also marked Namibia's debut appearance at a Rugby World Cup. However, he did not play in any of the matches during the World Cup campaign as Namibia bowed out of the competition after having lost to France, Fiji and Canada.

=== 2003 Rugby World Cup ===
He was ruled out of the first three group stage matches against tough opponents Australia, Ireland and Argentina due to a leg injury and subsequently Namibia lost to these teams in an embarrassing manner including a hammering defeat of 142–0 in the hands of Australia. He made a comeback return to Namibian rugby union side in their last group stage match against Romania which also marked van Vuuren's first ever Rugby World Cup match. He came on as a substitute in the 70th minute in Namibia's last match of the tournament against Romania, which Namibia finally lost 37–7 .

=== 2003 ICC Cricket World Cup ===
He played a crucial role in Namibia's qualification to the 2003 Cricket World Cup with his impressive bowling performances during the 2001 ICC Trophy where saw Namibia enjoyed 10 consecutive wins on the trot before losing to the Netherlands on the final ball of the 2001 ICC Trophy Final. He was the pick of the bowlers for Namibia in their final against Netherlands with 3/35 despite Netherlands managed to chase 196 on the final ball of the match. He ended the 2001 ICC Trophy as the leading wicket taker for Namibia with 13 scalps.

He was included in the Namibian national squad for the 2003 Cricket World Cup which also marked Namibia's maiden appearance in the Cricket World Cup. He made his One Day International (ODI) debut on 16 February 2003 against Pakistan at the 2003 ICC Cricket World Cup and it also marked his first World Cup match. He bowled the full quota of ten overs on his ODI and World Cup debut match against Pakistan conceding 47 runs without taking a wicket. He was the second joint top scorer for Namibia with 14 runs in their run chase of 256 as Namibia crumbled to just 84 runs on the board, resulting in a massive 171 run defeat.

He picked up his maiden five-wicket haul in ODI cricket as well as in international cricket in only in his second ODI appearance when he ran through the powerhouse England batting order by taking the wickets of Nick Knight, Michael Vaughan, Craig White, Ronnie Irani and Andy Caddick. He also became the first Namibian ever to have taken a fifer in ODI cricket as well as first Namibian player to grab a five-wicket haul in any form of international cricket and also remains the first and only player from Namibia to have taken a five wicket haul in a World Cup match. He also became the first bowler ever to pick up a five-wicket haul in an ODI at the St George's Park, Port Elizabeth. He was also one of the eleven bowlers to have taken a five-wicket haul during the 2003 edition of the Cricket World Cup. His spell of 5/43 in ten overs including two maiden overs restricted England to 272 all out and his bowling efforts gave Namibia a glimmer of hope in their contest against England, but Namibia fell short of chasing the target of 273 by a margin of 55 runs despite a much improved batting performance by Namibia, albeit of a well composed half-century from the opener Jan-Berry Burger. His bowling figures of 5/43 remained as the best bowling figures by a bowler for Namibia in ODI cricket for 16 years until it was surpassed by Jan Frylinck on 27 April 2019. However, his record breaking spell of 5/43 remains the best bowling figures by a Namibian bowler against a top-tier test playing nation. He is also the first associate cricketer to have taken a fifer against a test playing nation in a World Cup match and he became only the third associate player to claim a fifer in a World Cup match after Shaukat Dukanwala of UAE and Austin Codrington of Canada. His spell of 5/43 against England is regarded as one of the best ever performances by an associate player in the history of the Cricket World Cup.

He then turned up as the only consolation with the ball for Namibia in their group stage match against eventual finalists India where he grabbed 2 wickets including the priced scalps of Virender Sehwag and Sachin Tendulkar. India went onto secure a comfortable victory by a margin of 181 runs defending the total of 311. During a group stage match between defending world champions Australia and newcomers Namibia, Australian middle order batsman Darren Lehmann smashed 28 runs in an over off van Vuuren's spell. He went onto leak 92 runs in 10 overs against Australia without grabbing a wicket as Australia hammered Namibia by a massive margin of 256 runs after Namibia being bowled out for just 45 runs in a mammoth run chase of 302.

He returned with figures of 1/63 in 10 overs including a maiden over in Namibia's last group stage match against the Netherlands, which Namibia went onto lose by a margin of 64 runs and Namibia bowed out of the World Cup ending at the bottom of their group with losing all of their six matches. It ultimately was his sixth and final ODI as well as final international cricket match he played in Namibian colours as Namibia had to wait for nearly around 13 years to play another One Day International. However, Rudi van Vuuren had a decent World Cup campaign for himself as he ended up as the leading wicket taker for Namibia in the tournament with eight scalps in five matches including having bowled four maidens.

== Conservation achievements ==
In 2005, Marlice and Rudie together with their long time friend Chris Heunis bought the farm Ovuuyo, 42 km outside of Windhoek where they started a conservation tourism organinisation and gave it the name N/a’an ku sê (Naankuse) which means God will protect us in the San language. N/'an ku sê has strong ties with Angelina Jolie and her family, specifically with her daughter Shiloh who was born in Namibia. N/a’an ku sê Wildlife Sanctuary opened in 2007.

The N/'an ku sê wildlife sanctuary has been repeatedly investigated by the Namibian Ministry of Environment, Forestry and Tourism for permit violations and illegal breeding and translocating of wild animals, particularly cheetahs and elephants. When confronted with the allegations, van Vuuren denied the claims and accused the ministry of incompetence.
