= Narendra Dave =

Kenyan cricket umpire (1950–2014)

Personal information
- Born: 10 March 1950; Umreth, India
- Died: 16 September 2014 (aged 64); Nairobi, Kenya

Umpiring information
- ODIs umpired: 1 (2001)
- Source: Cricinfo, 17 May 2014

Narendra N. Dave (10 March 1950 – 16 September 2014) was an Indian-born Kenyan cricket umpire. Mainly umpiring at the first-class level, the only international match he officiated in was a One Day International in 2001.

== See also ==
- List of One Day International cricket umpires
