= Simba Union Ground =

Cricket grounds in Kenya

Coordinates: 1°16′2.16″S 36°49′41.77″E

Simba Union Club Ground
- Interactive map of Simba Union Club Ground

Ground information
- Location: Nairobi
- Country: Kenya
- Establishment: 2008
- Capacity: 2,000
- Owner: Simba Union
- Operator: Simba Union
- Tenants: Simba Union
- End names
- Forest Road End; City Park End

International information
- Only ODI: August 15, 2001: Kenya v West Indies
- As of September 2, 2015; Source: Cricinfo

The Simba Union Ground is one of several cricket grounds in Nairobi. It is also the home of Simba Union Cricket Club as well as the home of Cricket Kenya academy. The ground is located across the road from Kenya's main Cricket ground the Nairobi Gymkhana Club. The ground has hosted a One Day International match when Kenya cricket team played against West Indies cricket team.

== One Day International Matches ==
List of ODI matches hosted at this stadium

S No	Team (A)	Team (B)	Winner	Margin	Year
1	Kenya	West Indies	West Indies	By 106 runs	2001

== List of Centuries ==
=== One Day Internationals ===
No.	Score	Player	Team	Balls	Inns.	Opposing team	Date	Result
1	152	Chris Gayle	West Indies	150	1	Kenya	15 August 2001	Won

== List of Five Wicket Hauls ==
=== One Day Internationals ===
No.	Bowler	Date	Team	Opposing team	Inn	Overs	Runs	Wkts	Econ	Batsmen	Result
1	Colin Stuart	15 August 2001	West Indies	Kenya	2	10	44	5	4.4	Ravindu Shah; Hitesh Modi; Martin Suji; Tony Suji; Collins Obuya	Won
