= Gavin Murgatroyd =

Namibian cricketer

Personal information
- Full name: Bryan Gavin Murgatroyd
- Born: 19 October 1969 (age 57); Walvis Bay, South West Africa
- Batting: Right-handed
- Bowling: Right-arm medium
- Role: Batsman

International information
- National side: Namibia (1990–2004)
- ODI debut (cap 8): 10 February 2003 v Zimbabwe
- Last ODI: 3 March 2003 v Netherlands

Career statistics
Competition	ODI	LA
Matches	6	16
Runs scored	90	375
Batting average	15.00	23.43
100s/50s	0/1	0/3
Top score	52	53
Catches/stumpings	0/–	2/–
- Source: ESPNcricinfo, 22 June 2017

Bryan Gavin Murgatroyd (born 19 October 1969 in Walvis Bay, South-West Africa) is a Namibian cricketer. He is a right-handed batsman. Since 2006, he has been billed as Gavin Murgatroyd. He made his international debut in February 2003. He was part of Namibia's first ever ODI team and was part of Namibia's first ever World Cup team.

== Career ==
He was part of Namibia's squad for the 1994 ICC Trophy which also incidentally marked Namibia's first ever ICC Trophy appearance. He showed the glimpses of his all-round prowess during the course of the competition both with the bat and ball. He was the leading run-scorer for Namibia during the 1994 ICC Trophy with 287 runs in 8 matches with a sublime batting average of 47.83 including a century. He also became the first Namibian to score a century in ICC Trophy when he achieved the historic feat during the Plate Final match against Denmark. His knock of 106 propelled Namibia to a competitive fighting total of 262/8 and his knock guided Namibia to claim the Plate title defeating Denmark by 41 runs. He also scored a crucial knock of 93 in Group C match against Israel which propelled Namibia to a competitive total of 257 and Namibia successfully defended the total albeit of bowling masterclass from Murgatroyd who shined with the ball for Namibia by being the pick of the bowlers with figures of 3/26 including a priced scalp of Neil Ward, who threatened to take the game away from Namibia. Murgatroyd bowled Ward for 92 and it eventually dented Israel's chance of winning the match and the former was awarded the player of the match. He also eventually ended up as the leading wicket-taker in the competition with 19 scalps in across 8 matches with an impressive bowling average of 10.26 and with a decent economy rate of 3.91, despite his valiant batting and bowling efforts, Namibia could not progress beyond group stage of the competition.

He also featured in the Namibian squad for the 1997 ICC Trophy where Namibia finished the tournament at fifteenth position. He was a key member of the Namibian squad which reached the final of the 2001 ICC Trophy where Namibia enjoyed 10 consecutive wins on the trot before losing to the Netherlands on the final ball of the 2001 ICC Trophy Final. Netherlands managed to chase 196 on the final ball of the match to seal the deal but Namibia was able to qualify for the 2003 Cricket World Cup. He was the third highest run-scorer for Namibia with 222 runs in 9 matches at the 2001 ICC Trophy just behind Danie Keulder and Riaan Walters.

He was included in the Namibian national squad for the 2003 Cricket World Cup which also marked Namibia's maiden appearance in the Cricket World Cup. He made his One Day International (ODI) debut on 10 February 2003 against neighbours Zimbabwe at the 2003 ICC Cricket World Cup, in what was considered as Namibia's first ever international cricket match, first ever ODI match as well as Namibia's first ever World Cup match. He featured in all six World Cup matches Namibia had played and his six World Cup appearances were the only international matches he had managed to play in his entire career as Namibia did not get to play any international official matches for 16 years until 2019. His last international appearance came during Namibia's final group stage match against the Netherlands on 3 March 2003 during the World Cup. His last major competitive cricket match appearance came on 12 November 2004 during the 2004/05 Faithwear Clothing Inter-Provincial One-Day Competition when he played for Namibia against Manicaland in a List A match.

In February 2020, he was named in Namibia's squad for the Over-50s Cricket World Cup in South Africa. However, the tournament was cancelled during the third round of matches due to the coronavirus pandemic. He was honored at the Cricket Namibia 2020 Annual Awards whereas he was acknowledged for his standout performance in the 2020 Over 50 World Cup with the bat and was presented the award for the top batsman after aggregating 90 runs in 3 matches against England, Wales and Pakistan. During the tournament, he scored a patient half-century against England in a rain affected match which was abandoned without a result. He and Rudi Birckenstock were the only standout batters for Namibia in the match against England where Namibia managed to score only 137/8 in the allocated 45 overs.
