= Morné Karg =

Namibian cricketer (born 1977)

Personal information
- Full name: Morné Karg
- Born: 12 July 1977 (age 49); Windhoek, South West Africa
- Batting: Right-handed
- Role: Wicket-keeper

International information
- National side: Namibia (1994–2005)
- ODI debut (cap 3): 10 February 2003 v Zimbabwe
- Last ODI: 3 March 2003 v Netherlands

Career statistics
Competition	ODI	FC	LA
Matches	3	1	13
Runs scored	45	29	186
Batting average	22.50	14.50	16.90
100s/50s	0/0	0/0	0/1
Top score	41	16	61
Catches/stumpings	1/0	0/–	11/1
- Source: ESPNcricinfo, 22 June 2017

Morné Karg (born 12 July 1977 in Windhoek) is a Namibian cricketer. He is a right-handed batsman and wicketkeeper.

He has appeared in the ICC Trophy since 1994 and in List A cricket between 2001 and 2003. He also played three One Day Internationals in the World Cup in 2003.

Karg's usual position in the batting line-up is as opener along with team-mate Jan-Berrie Burger.
