= Johannes van der Merwe =

Namibian cricketer (born 1980)

Personal information
- Full name: Hannes Marthinus van der Merwe
- Born: 5 February 1980 (age 46); Windhoek, South-West Africa
- Batting: Right-handed
- Bowling: Right-arm off break

International information
- National side: Namibia

Domestic team information
- Years: Team
- 2002/03: Namibia

Career statistics
Competition	First-class	List A
Matches	1	5
Runs scored	50	67
Batting average	25.00	13.40
100s/50s	–/–	–/–
Top score	48	46
Balls bowled	–	–
Wickets	–	–
Bowling average	–	–
5 wickets in innings	–	–
10 wickets in match	–	–
Best bowling	–	–
Catches/stumpings	–/–	2/–
- Source: CricketArchive (subscription required), 16 October 2011

Hannes van der Merwe (born February 5, 1980) was a Namibian cricketer. He was a right-handed batsman and a right-arm offbreak bowler.

Born in Windhoek, the young batsman played in several youth one-day internationals during the Under-19 World Cups of 1997/98 and 1999/2000, his first match coming against Bangladesh Under-19s on January 12, 1998, where he was bowled out by a duck by Shabbir Khan.

Two years later, in the 1999/2000 Under-19 World Cup, he watched Australia Under-19s beat his team by 266 runs in a match dominated by Australian attack. He took part in the 2004 Intercontinental Cup where the Namibians lost by five wickets to Uganda.
