= Riaan Walters =

Namibian cricketer (born 1980)

Personal information
- Full name: Riaan Walters
- Born: 10 August 1980 (age 46); Windhoek, South West Africa
- Batting: Right-handed
- Bowling: Right-arm fast-medium
- Role: Batsman

International information
- National side: Namibia (1997–2009)
- ODI debut (cap 11): 10 February 2003 v Zimbabwe
- Last ODI: 16 February 2003 v Pakistan

Career statistics
Competition	ODI	FC	LA
Matches	2	4	21
Runs scored	0	76	380
Batting average	0.00	12.66	19.00
100s/50s	0/0	0/0	0/0
Top score	0	25	48
Catches/stumpings	0/–	0/–	4/–
- Source: ESPNcricinfo, 22 June 2017

Riaan Walters (born 10 August 1980) is a Namibian cricketer. He is a right-handed batsman, who often plays as the opening batsman in the Namibian attack. He played in two One Day Internationals in the Cricket World Cup in 2003, though he remained scoreless in both matches. He also played in the ICC Trophy between 2001 and 2005. In the 2001 tournament his misfield off the final ball of the final cost his side the Trophy.
