= Sir Ali Muslim Club Ground =

Cricket ground in Kenya

Coordinates: 1°16′35.42″S 36°50′00.42″E

- Interactive map of Sir Ali Muslim Club Ground

Ground information
- Location: Nairobi, Kenya
- Country: Kenya
- Establishment: 1934
- End names
- Park Road; Eastleigh

Team information
Kenya Women	(2009–2010)
Kenya	(2003–2004)
- As of 18 October 2011; Source: Ground profile

Sir Ali Muslim Club Ground is a cricket ground in Nairobi, Kenya.

The first recorded match at the ground took place in 1994, when Young Kenya played Bangladesh in a warm-up match for the ICC Trophy, which Kenya was hosting. During the Trophy itself, the ground was the venue for seven matches, involving various national teams.

In 2003, the ground held its first List A matches when Kenya played Sri Lanka A in a two-match series. The following year, the third List A match was held there, when Kenya played Pakistan A. As part of the series with Pakistan A, a first-class match was also played between the sides, which resulted in a drawn match. In addition, the ground has played host to Kenya Women.

The ground is owned by the Sir Ali Muslim Club, a club founded in 1934 by the local Muslim community, which consisted mostly of people from across the Indian subcontinent. Besides cricket, the club offers football, hockey, tennis, squash and volleyball.

The club is named in honour of the wealthy administrator, the Hon. Sir Ali bin Salim, K.B.E., C.M.G., who helped to fund and provide advice to the club. Sir Ali was a provincial governor on Swahili Coast of the British East Africa Protectorate, during the condominium between the Sultan of Zanzibar and the British and, later, an official Member of the Legislative Council [MLC].
