= Lennie Louw =

Namibian cricketer (born 1959)

Personal information
- Full name: Jan Leonardus Louw
- Born: 19 June 1959 (age 67); Barkly West, Cape Province, South Africa
- Batting: Right-handed
- Bowling: Left-arm fast-medium Slow left-arm orthodox
- Role: Bowler

International information
- National side: Namibia (1990–2003)
- ODI debut (cap 7): 10 February 2003 v Zimbabwe

Domestic team information
- Years: Team
- 1976/77: Griqualand West
- 1981/82: Western Province B
- 1982/83: Northern Transvaal B

Career statistics
| Competition | ODI | FC | LA |
|---|---|---|---|
| Matches | 1 | 5 | 11 |
| Runs scored | – | 17 | 70 |
| Batting average | – | 3.40 | 17.50 |
| 100s/50s | – | 0/0 | 0/0 |
| Top score | – | 7* | 20* |
| Balls bowled | 60 | 968 | 588 |
| Wickets | 1 | 20 | 11 |
| Bowling average | 60.00 | 21.75 | 27.18 |
| 5 wickets in innings | 0 | 1 | 0 |
| 10 wickets in match | 0 | 0 | 0 |
| Best bowling | 1/60 | 7/57 | 3/8 |
| Catches/stumpings | 1/– | 2/– | 2/– |
- Source: ESPNcricinfo, 22 June 2017

Jan Leonardus Louw (born 19 June 1959), known as Lennie Louw, is a South African-born Namibian former cricketer.

Louw made his One Day International debut for Namibia in the World Cup in 2003 at the age of 43, having spent the previous 27 years playing first-class cricket in South Africa. He also played in the ICC Trophy between 1994 and 2001. At the 2001 ICC Trophy, he also coached Namibia.

In February 2020, he was named in Namibia's squad for the Over-50s Cricket World Cup in South Africa. However, the tournament was cancelled during the third round of matches due to the coronavirus pandemic.
