= Danie Keulder =

Namibian cricketer (born 1973)

Personal information
- Full name: Daniel Keulder
- Born: 2 August 1973 (age 53); Keetmanshoop, South West Africa
- Batting: Right-handed
- Bowling: Right-arm off break
- Role: Batsman

International information
- National side: Namibia (1994–2005)
- ODI debut (cap 4): 10 February 2003 v Zimbabwe
- Last ODI: 3 March 2003 v Netherlands

Career statistics
Competition	ODI	FC	LA
Matches	6	3	31
Runs scored	132	210	837
Batting average	22.00	35.00	27.90
100s/50s	0/1	0/2	0/5
Top score	52	90	83
Balls bowled	–	108	459
Wickets	–	2	12
Bowling average	–	26.50	35.25
5 wickets in innings	–	0	0
10 wickets in match	–	0	0
Best bowling	–	2/28	3/22
Catches/stumpings	3/–	6/–	15/–
- Source: ESPNcricinfo, 22 June 2017

Danie Keulder (born 2 August 1973) is a former Namibian cricketer, who has played for Namibia's national cricket team from 1994 until 2005. He first appeared for Namibia in the 1994 ICC Trophy, against Canada in a match that his team lost by eight wickets, having put a mere 51 runs on the board.

He also participated in a not-so crushing defeat by the Netherlands, which saw Klaas-Jan van Noortwijk and Feiko Kloppenburg score 255 of the 314 runs between six batsmen in 50 overs, including a 228 second-wicket partnership.

Keulder retired from cricket in 2005 following a back injury.
