= Jan-Berry Burger =

Namibian cricketer (born 1981)

Personal information
- Full name: Andries Johannes Burger
- Born: 25 August 1981 (age 45); Newcastle, South Africa
- Batting: Right-handed
- Bowling: Right-arm leg break
- Role: Batsman

International information
- National side: Namibia (1998–2013)
- ODI debut (cap 1): 10 February 2003 v Zimbabwe
- Last ODI: 3 March 2003 v Netherlands

Career statistics
Competition	ODI	FC	LA
Matches	6	26	63
Runs scored	199	1,303	1,724
Batting average	33.16	28.95	27.36
100s/50s	0/1	0/9	2/8
Top score	85	88	131
Balls bowled	96	1,928	535
Wickets	3	37	12
Bowling average	34.66	34.05	36.91
5 wickets in innings	0	2	0
10 wickets in match	0	0	0
Best bowling	1/18	6/56	3/24
Catches/stumpings	0/–	17/–	26/–
- Source: ESPNcricinfo, 22 June 2017

Andries Johannes Burger (born 25 August 1981), known as Jan-Berry Burger, is a Namibian former cricketer, who played for Namibia's national cricket team. He made his international debut in February 2003. He was part of Namibia's first ever ODI team and Namibia's first ever World Cup team.

== Biography ==
He was born in Newcastle, KwaZulu-Natal in South Africa. He was raised up in Pretoria and later moved to Namibia along with his father at the age of 16. However, he returned to South Africa and joined the Free State Cricket Academy in 2000. He also pursued his higher education at the Stellenbosch University.

== Domestic career ==
He also played in the Birmingham and District Premier League representing Knowle and Dorridge Cricket Club. He also played for Horsham Cricket Club in the Sussex Cricket League.

== International career ==
Burger captained Namibia national under-19 cricket team at the 2000 Under-19 Cricket World Cup which was held in Sri Lanka. He was part of the Namibian side which emerged as runners-up to Netherlands in the 2001 ICC Trophy and as a result, Namibia qualified for the 2003 World Cup.

He was called to the Namibia team at the age of 21 for the 2003 Cricket World Cup at a time when he was pursuing a degree in human resource management at the Stellenbosch University in South Africa. He was allowed by the university to play in the 2003 Cricket World Cup which also marked Namibia's first ever World Cup appearance. He made his ODI debut during the same year's World Cup tournament against hosts and neighbouring Zimbabwe which also marked Namibia's first ever ODI match as well as Namibia's first ever World Cup match. Incidentally, he received Namibia's first cap in ODI cricket.

During a group stage match against England, he scored 85 in as many as 86 balls including 10 fours and one six while opening the batting in a massive run chase of 273. He also became the first Namibian batsman to score an ODI fifty as well as the first Namibian batsman to score a half-century in a World Cup match. Despite his valiant efforts, Namibia fell short by 55 runs but was able to put up a spirited fight against England in the match. Despite his innings ending in a losing cause for Namibia, he was awarded the man-of-the-match and became the first Namibian to receive player-of-the-match award in ODI cricket. He also added a crucial 97 run partnership with Danie Keulder in the match for the third wicket off 108 balls to give Namibia a glimmer of hope in the run chase. He held the highest individual score by a Namibian batsman in ODI cricket for 16 years until it was surpassed by Jean-Pierre Kotze in 2019.

He made his first-class debut for Namibia against Kenya on 1 October 2004 at the 2004 ICC Intercontinental Cup. He captained Namibia at the 2004 ICC Six Nations Challenge and also played in the 2005 ICC Trophy. He was also a member of the Namibian which emerged as runners-up to United Arab Emirates at the 2011 ICC World Cricket League Division Two.
