= 1986 ICC Trophy squads =

Sixteen teams participated in the 1986 ICC Trophy, the third edition of the tournament. No teams were making their debut, but two teams, Singapore and West Africa, did not return from the previous tournament in 1982. They were replaced by Argentina and Denmark, both of which had not appeared since the inaugural edition in 1979.

== Argentina ==
Only players who appeared in at least one match at the tournament are listed. The leading run-scorer is marked with a dagger (†) and the leading wicket-taker with a double dagger (‡).

- Leo Alonso
- Douglas Annand
- Steve Bryans
- Derek Culley †
- Alexander Gooding ‡
- Robert Kirton
- Martin Martinez

- Alan Morris ‡
- Miguel Morris
- Brian Roberts
- Mark Roberts
- Luis Ross
- Peter Stocks
- Paul Taylor

Source: ESPNcricinfo

== Bangladesh ==
Only players who appeared in at least one match at the tournament are listed. The leading run-scorer is marked with a dagger (†) and the leading wicket-taker with a double dagger (‡).

- Athar Ali Khan
- Atiq Khan
- Gazi Ashraf
- Gholam Nousher
- Golam Faruq
- Jahangir Shah‡
- Minhajul Abedin
- Nasir Ahmed

- Nehal Hasnain †
- Rafiqul Alam
- Raqibul Hasan
- Samiur Rahman
- Shaheedur Rahman
- Tanjeeb Ahsan
- Zahid Razzak

Source: ESPNcricinfo

== Bermuda ==
Only players who appeared in at least one match at the tournament are listed. The leading run-scorer is marked with a dagger (†) and the leading wicket-taker with a double dagger (‡).

- Gary Brangman
- Terry Burgess
- Allan Douglas
- Pacer Edwards ‡
- Noel Gibbons
- Ricky Hill †
- Olin Jones
- Steven Lightbourne

- Andre Manders
- Arnold Manders
- Charlie Marshall
- Winston Reid
- Mark Trott
- John Tucker
- Clevie Wade

Source: ESPNcricinfo

== Canada ==
Only players who appeared in at least one match at the tournament are listed. The leading run-scorer is marked with a dagger (†) and the leading wicket-taker with a double dagger (‡).

- Derek Abraham ‡
- Garvin Budhoo
- David Butcher
- John Corbin
- Ron Dipchand
- Derick Etwaroo
- Errol Jack
- Rohan Jayasekera

- Farooq Kirmani
- Clement Neblett
- Martin Prashad
- Paul Prashad †
- Roy Ramsammy
- Bhawan Singh
- Danny Singh
- Francis Waithe

Source: ESPNcricinfo

== Denmark ==
Only players who appeared in at least one match at the tournament are listed. The leading run-scorer is marked with a dagger (†) and the leading wicket-taker with a double dagger (‡).

- Christian Ankersø
- Niels Bindslev
- Allan From-Hansen
- Thony Hadersland
- Søren Henriksen †
- Johnny Jensen
- Tim Jensen

- Søren Mikkelsen
- Jørgen Morild
- Ole Mortensen ‡
- Torben Nielsen
- Troel Nielsen
- Mogens Seider
- Steen Thomsen

Source: ESPNcricinfo

== East Africa ==
Only players who appeared in at least one match at the tournament are listed. The leading run-scorer is marked with a dagger (†) and the leading wicket-taker with a double dagger (‡).

- Haroon Bags
- Balraj Bouri
- Pravin Desai
- David Galooba
- Alnasir Hasham
- Anil Kumar
- Sajaad Lakha ‡
- Hitash Patadia

- Dinesh Patel
- Farouk Patel
- Jayesh Patel
- Kirit Patel
- Gulam Shariff †
- James Shikuku
- Vali Tarmohamed
- Sam Walusimbi

Source: ESPNcricinfo

== Fiji ==
Only players who appeared in at least one match at the tournament are listed. The leading run-scorer is marked with a dagger (†) and the leading wicket-taker with a double dagger (‡).

- Taione Batina
- Cecil Browne †
- Stephen Campbell
- Pensioni Gauna
- Roderick Jepsen
- S. Koto
- Joeli Mateyawa

- Jack McGoon
- Jone Seuvou
- Jone Sorovakatini
- Atunaisi Tawatatau ‡
- Eroni Vakausausa
- Inoke Veikauyaki
- Apenisa Waqaninamata ‡

Source: ESPNcricinfo

== Gibraltar ==
Only players who appeared in at least one match at the tournament are listed. The leading run-scorer is marked with a dagger (†) and the leading wicket-taker with a double dagger (‡).

- Steve Boylan
- Bob Brooks
- Joe Buzaglo
- Richard Buzaglo
- Tim Buzaglo
- Gary De'Ath †
- Tito Gomez
- Salvador Perez
- Wilfred Perez

- Ian Prescott
- Alan Procter
- Jeffrey Rhodes
- Clive Robinson
- Christian Rocca
- Willie Scott
- Mike Smith
- Peter White ‡

Source: ESPNcricinfo

== Hong Kong ==
Only players who appeared in at least one match at the tournament are listed. The leading run-scorer is marked with a dagger (†) and the leading wicket-taker with a double dagger (‡).

- Peter Anderson
- Ray Brewster
- Brian Catton
- Chris Collins
- Glyn Davies
- Bob Fotheringham ‡
- Rob Gill
- Bharat Gohel

- Des Greenwood
- Simon Myles †
- Nanda Perera
- Martin Sabine
- Neil Smith
- Nigel Stearns
- Yarman Vachha
- Mike Walsh

Source: ESPNcricinfo

== Israel ==
Only players who appeared in at least one match at the tournament are listed. The leading run-scorer is marked with a dagger (†) and the leading wicket-taker with a double dagger (‡).

- Hillel Awasker ‡
- Benjamin David
- Noah Davidson
- Nissam Jhirad
- Michael Mohnblatt
- Zion Moshe
- Alan Moss
- David Moss †

- St. Eval Nemblette
- Stanley Perlman
- Shimshon Raj
- Nissam Reuben
- Reuben Reuben
- Joey Tal
- Valice Worrell

Source: ESPNcricinfo

== Kenya ==
Only players who appeared in at least one match at the tournament are listed. The leading run-scorer is marked with a dagger (†) and the leading wicket-taker with a double dagger (‡).

- Avinash Chotai
- Tariq Iqbal
- Aasif Karim
- Daniel Macdonald
- Hitesh Mehta
- Alfred Njuguna
- Tito Odumbe

- Anil Patel
- Sailesh Radia
- Bharat Sawjani
- Zahoor Sheikh ‡
- Sudhir Solanki
- Tom Tikolo †
- Naguib Verjee

Source: ESPNcricinfo

== Malaysia ==
Only players who appeared in at least one match at the tournament are listed. The leading run-scorer is marked with a dagger (†) and the leading wicket-taker with a double dagger (‡).

- Amarjit Singh Gill
- Asgari Stevens †
- Balakrishnan Nair
- Banerji Nair
- Desmon Patrik ‡
- Harris Abu Bakar
- Hatta Pattabongi

- K. Kamalanathan
- Lim Ju Jing
- Mohammad Saat Jalil
- Pasha Syafiq Ali
- Peter Budin
- V. Vijayalingham
- Yazid Imran

Source: ESPNcricinfo

== Netherlands ==
Only players who appeared in at least one match at the tournament are listed. The leading run-scorer is marked with a dagger (†) and the leading wicket-taker with a double dagger (‡).

- Steve Atkinson †
- Paul-Jan Bakker
- Eric Dulfer
- Ronnie Elferink ‡
- Peter Entrop
- Rupert Gomes
- Roland Lefebvre

- Steven Lubbers
- Rene Schoonheim
- Mark van Heijningen
- Rob van Weelde
- Diederik Visée
- Huib Visée

Source: ESPNcricinfo

== Papua New Guinea ==
Only players who appeared in at least one match at the tournament are listed. The leading run-scorer is marked with a dagger (†) and the leading wicket-taker with a double dagger (‡).

- Charles Amini
- Karo Ao
- Tau Ao
- Babani Harry †
- Raki Ila
- Renagi Ila
- Api Leka

- Daure Lohia
- William Maha
- Lagoa Manu
- Tuku Raka
- Gamu Ravu ‡
- Namba Tiana
- Taunao Vai

Source: ESPNcricinfo

== United States ==
Only players who appeared in at least one match at the tournament are listed. The leading run-scorer is marked with a dagger (†) and the leading wicket-taker with a double dagger (‡).

- Hubert Blackman
- Yawar Faraz
- Teddy Foster
- Kishore Karecha
- Fazal Karim
- Neil Lashkari
- Kumar Lorick
- Jefferson Miller

- Tim Mills
- M. U. Prabhudas ‡
- Kamran Rasheed †
- Sew Shivnarine
- Sam Smith
- Victor Stoute
- Kennedy Venkersammy
- Jawaid Wajid

Source: ESPNcricinfo

== Zimbabwe ==
Only players who appeared in at least one match at the tournament are listed. The leading run-scorer is marked with a dagger (†) and the leading wicket-taker with a double dagger (‡).

- Eddo Brandes
- Robin Brown
- Iain Butchart
- Christopher Cox
- David Houghton
- Malcolm Jarvis
- Grant Paterson †

- Andy Pycroft
- Peter Rawson ‡
- Colin Robertson
- Ali Shah
- John Traicos
- Gary Wallace
- Andy Waller

Source: ESPNcricinfo

== Sources ==
- CricketArchive: Averages by teams, ICC Trophy 1986
- ESPNcricinfo: ICC Trophy, 1986 / Statistics
