= West Bengal cricket team in Bangladesh in 1982–83 =

In March 1983, the West Bengal side from India came to Dhaka, for a short tour. The side was led by Dilip Doshi. The visitors convincingly won both their matches.

== The 3 day Match (4–6 March 1983) ==
West Bengal	Bangladesh
Palash Nandy	Yousuf Rahman
Pranab Roy	Nazim Shirazi
Raja Venkat	Gazi Ashraf Lipu
Avik Mitra	Raqibul Hasan
Rajesh Dani	Rafiqul Alam
Arup Bhatttacharya	Nehal Hasnain
Sambaran Banerjee (WK)	Shafiq-ul-Haq (Captain) (WK)
Partha Sen	Jahangir Shah
Sujan Mukherjee	Ziaul Islam Masud
Madan Bose	Wahidul Gani
Dilip Doshi (Captain)	Anwarul Amin

Batting first, the tourists established an early control, as their opening pair of Palash Nandy and Pranab Roy posed a century partnership. Roy fell for 45, but Nandy went on to score a well made century (107). With Raja Venkat contributing 38, WB declared, early on the 2nd morning at 267/6. Yousuf Rahman was the most successful Bangladeshi bowler with 3/40.

In reply, the local side badly capitulated against the left arm spin of the WB captain. Doshi took 7/39 to dismiss the hosts for a meager 93. Only Raquibul with 26 and Rafiqul Alam with 20 could play him with any confidence.

Following on, the local side needed to bat the whole of the third day to avoid an embarrassing defeat. Things started well, as the top order showed greater determination. Nazim 29, Raqibul Hasan 26 and Yousuf Rahman 18, took the score up to 76/2 at the lunch break. After that though, the middle order collapsed completely as the off spinner Sujan Mukherjee joined his captain in the carnage. The pair equally shared the 10 Bangladeshi wickets, as the hosts were bowled for 132. Only Rafiq, with 26, showed any resistance after lunch. Bangladesh lost the game by an innings and 42 runs.

== The One-day (45 overs) Match (8 march, 1983) ==
West Bengal	Bangladesh
Palash Nandy	Yousuf Rahman
Pranab Roy	Nazim Shirazi
Raja Venkat	Assaduzzaman Misha
Pranob Nandy	Raqibul Hasan
Probir Chel	Omar Khaled Rumy
Arup Bhatttacharya	Rafiqul Alam
Sambaran Banerjee (WK)	Shafiq-ul-Haq (Captain) (WK)
Partha Sen	Jahangir Shah
Sujan Mukherjee	Nadir Shah
Subroto	Abul Khair Mohon
Dilip Doshi(Captain)	Dipu Chowdhury

Despite the heavy defeat of the local side in the 3-day fixture, a good holiday crowd gathered to watch the 45 over match in the following Sunday. After the crushing defeat, the Bangladesh team went through big changes. Most interesting was the recall of the experienced all-rounder Omar Khaled Rumy.

West Bengal batted first, and after a brisk start Palash Nandy was run out. Left arm fast bowler, Dipu Chowdhury, then took 2 wickets in 2 balls to put the visitors under pressure. When Jahangir Shah bowled Prabir Chel, the WB side was struggling badly at 45/4.

Unfortuantley for the local side, the back up bowlers failed to apply the same pressure, and WB middle order recovered. Pranab Roy with 59 & left-hander Arup Bhattacharya with 54 gave the innings some stability. The tail collapsed against the gentle medium pace of Yousuf Rahman and the WB side was bowled out for only 175. Yousuf Rahman 3/18 & Dipu Chowdhury 3/29 did most of the damage.

Things started to go wrong for the local side even before they started their chase. Their most experienced opener Yousuf Rahman injured himself in the field, and did not bat at all. A reshuffled batting line up saw Assaduzzaman Misha join Nazim Shirazi in the opening partnership. Their inexperience in One day cricket was evident, as both of them got run out very cheaply. The experienced pair of Omar Khaled Rumy & Raqibul Hasan, batted for a long time, but they failed to give the innings any momentum. Rumy scored a sluggish 20 while Raqibul top scored 27, but the rest of the batting collapsed against the WB spinners. Doshi, the nemesis of the Bangladesh batting, took 3/27, and Arup completed a splendid all round performance by taking 3/18. Bangladesh finished at 120/8, losing the match by 55 runs.

Three members of the same family played for Bangladesh in this match. Jahangir Shah, a regular member of the side, was joined by his younger brother Nadir Shah (Now, an international umpire), and his much younger cousin Nazim Shirazi. The WB side included the Nandy brothers, Palash & Pranob.
