= Bangladeshi cricket team in Kenya in 1983–84 =

The tour of the Bangladesh national cricket team to Kenya, during February, 1984, was the first visit of Bangladesh to any associate member country. The tour started a rivalry (between Bangladesh & Kenya cricket teams) which became very intense in the 1990s. On this tour, Bangladesh drew the only 3-Day fixture, won a 2-day (over restricted) match, but won only 1 of the 5 limited over matches(That too against the Combined School XI). Overall, it was a disappointing tour for the Bangladesh side.

== Bangladesh team ==
The tour followed immediately after the South East Asian Cricket cup in Bangladesh. Apart from the Bangladesh National team (which won the cup), The Bangladesh Tigers (The unofficial 'A' team, consisting mostly of youngsters) had participated in that cup. Players like, Rafiqul Alam. Minhajul Abedin Nannu, Hafizur Rahman & Wahidul Gani, having done well for the tigers were included in the team for Kenya tour. The team had a nice balance of youth and experience, yet during the tour, they failed to perform up to expectations, mainly due to disunity among the players. There was conflict of interests between the younger and older members of the side.

== Scores in brief ==
Date	Match			Result
4 February	Bangladesh v Kenya (U-19)	Kenya 183/8 (Jahangir Shah 4/32)	Bangladesh 96 (Alfred 4/14)	Kenya(U-19) wins by 87 runs
5 February	Bangladesh V Kenya	Bangladesh 143 ( Raqibul Hasan 47, Alfred 3/25)	Kenya 144/2 (Desai 61)	Kenya wins by 8 wickets
8–9 February (2 day Match)	Bangladesh V Kenya Cricket Coach XI	Bangladesh 206/9 (Minhajul Abedin 44, Gazi Ashraf 43) & 151/8 (Gazi Ashraf 41)	Kenya 196 (Al Noor 73, Golam Faruq 2/28) & 128/8 (Yousuf Rahman 3/16)	Bangladesh wins by 33 runs
11–13 February (3 Day Match)	Bangladesh V Kenya	Kenya 309/7 (Shahid Khan 149, Anil Patel 122, Jahangir Shah 4/79) & 229/3 (Shahid Khan 74, Anil Patel 71*)	Bangladesh 371 (Assaduzzaman Misha 68, Raqibul Hasan 64, Harris 4/89) & 27/5 (Varjee 4/17)	Match Drawn
15 February	Bangladesh Vs Kenya Cricket Assoaciation	Bangladesh 119 (Belal 34, Arshad 4/15)	Kenya 120/5 (Jagdeep singh 54*, Yousuf Rahman 3/19)	Kenya wins by 5 wickets
17 February	Bangladesh vs Kenya (Combined School XI)	Kenya 135/8 (Wahidul Gani 3/25, Yousuf Rahman 2/26)	Bangladesh 136/5 (Misha 47, Rajib 2/18)	Bangladesh wins by 5 wickets
18 February	Bangladesh vs Kenya	Bangladesh 115 (Harris 3/18, Alfred 3/18)	Kenya 116/1 (Anil Patel 58*, Desai 41*)	Kenya wins by 9 wickets

== Bangladesh performance ==
Despite the poor performance of the side Assaduzzaman Misha emerged as a bright light during the tour. Considered as not suitable for limited over game, he was not picked for the first two one-day matches. Given his chance in the 2 Day match, he scored 33 and 36. But his best came in the 3-Day match against the Kenya national XI. After the hosts posted a 300+ score, Misha led a spirited Bangladesh reply. He top scored with 68 & put on 73 with Minhajul Abedin for the 1st wicket, and 71 with Gazi Ashraf for the 2nd. Surprisingly, despite this performance Misha was dropped for the One-Day Match against Kenya Cricket Association. He returned to the team for the last two matches and scored 47 & 23 (top score for his side on each occasion). Following the retirement of Yousuf Rahman, at the end of the season, Misha was the undisputed No. 1 opener of the country. Unfortunately, like many others of his generation, he gave greater importance to his professional career (he was a doctor by profession). Thus, he was very rarely available for national team duty after 1985.

Lipu did well in the 2 Day and 3 Day matches. but failed in the One-Day matches. With, regular opener Yousuf Babu struggling for form, Nehal Hasnain & Minhajul Abedin Nannu were tried in the opening slot.

Yousuf Rahman failed with the bat, but rather unexpectedly, he emerged as his team's most effective bowler. Badshah put on a big effort in the 3 Day match and won admiration from the opponents. Lipu and Misha did a good job as part-time spinners, but the main spin bowler Wahidul Gani was very disappointing.

== Top batsman and bowler ==
Name	Matches	Runs	Average	Highest Score	100 / 50
Assaduzzaman Misha	4	207	34.50	68	0/1

Name	Matches	Runs	Wickets	Average	Best
Yousuf Rahman	7	209	12	17.42	3/16

== Bitter rivalry ==
This tour started a bitter rivalry between two of the more stronger associate member nations. During the next decade or so, they met each other regularly in different ICC Trophy tournaments.

Year	Venue			Result
1986	England	Bangladesh 143 (Minhajul Abedin 50, Rafiqul Alam 32)	Kenya 143 (Jahangir Shah 3/25, Gazi Ashraf 3/26)	Bangladesh wins by 9 runs
1990	Netherlands	Kenya 189 (Maurice Odumbe 41, Minhajul Abedin 3/29)	Bangladesh 190/7 (Gazi Ashraf 40, Akram Khan 39*	Bangladesh wins by 3 wickets
1994	Kenya	Kenya 295/6 (Maurice Odumbe 119)	Bangladesh 282/8 (Aminul Islam74, Minhajul Abedin 68, Jahangir Alam 57, Asif Karim 3/55)	Kenya wins by 13 runs
1997	Malaysia	Kenya 241/7 (50 overs) (Steve Tikolo 147, Mohammad Rafique 3/40 )	Bangladesh 166/8 (25 overs) (Aminul Islam 37, Asif Karim 3/31)	Bangladesh wins by 2 wickets (D/L Method)

In 1986, both the teams performed very poorly in the tournament. But, in 1990, both the teams reached SF with Bangladesh finishing 3rd, and Kenya 4th. They met in a vital match in the 94 ICC trophy. After their defeat at the hands of the Netherlands, it was a do or die match for Bangladesh. A narrow defeat saw them miss their chance of a WC place. Kenya eventually finished runners up (Behind the United Arab Emirates) and qualified for the 1996 World Cup in the Indian subcontinent. In 1997, the two teams met in a thrilling final. With both sides already assured of WC places only pride was at stake. Bangladesh snatched a last ball victory to lift the Trophy. In July, 1997, both the nations were granted permission to play full ODIs and thus were guaranteed a place in the future WCs, so the saga of ICC Trophy ended there.

Year	Venue			Result
2003	South Africa	Kenya 217/7 (Maurice Odumbe 52, Sanwar Hossain 3/49)	Bangladesh 185(Tushar Imran 48, Akram Khan 44, Maurice Odumbe 4/38, Steve Tikolo 3/14)	Kenya wins by 32 runs

The only meeting between the two nations in World Cup cricket came at Johannesburg, South Africa, in 2003. Kenya won this match and eventually went onto reach the Semi-Finals. The old nemesis, Maurice Odumbe came back to haunt the Bangladeshi players again, with a superb all-round performance. This, however, is Kenya's last ODI win (Until July 2009), over Bangladesh. Bangladesh has dominated the recent matches.

== Bangladesh vs Kenya: head to head in ODIs ==
Venue	Matches	Bangladesh	Kenya	Tie/NR
Bangladesh	6	4	2	0
Kenya	5	3	2	0
Neutral	3	1	2	0
Overall	14	8	6	0

The first full ODI between the 2 teams took place at Nairobi, in Oct. 1997, and resulted in a crushing victory for the hosts. Chudasama (122) & Kennedy Otieno (144) put on 225 for the first wicket, as the hosts rattled a huge total of 347/3 from their 50 overs. In reply, Bangladesh could only master 197. Bangladesh achieved their first ever ODI win, when they beat Kenya at Hyderabad(India)in 1998. Chasing 237 for victory, Bangladesh reached their target thanks mainly to Mohammad Rafique, who scored 77. Bangladesh's next victory over Kenya didn't come before 2006. But, since then, Bangladesh, now a full member of ICC, has totally dominated the rivalry.

== Co-operation between the rivals ==
Despite the intense rivalry between the two countries, there is also considerable cooperation as well. In early 1995, Kenya toured Bangladesh. Though, they lost most of the games, this tour gave them the opportunity to gain valuable experience about South Asian pitches and conditions. This experience helped them in their WC performance a year later. With the Bangladesh side going through some changes, following the disastrous ICC Trophy, a year earlier, this tour provided the local selectors the chance to try some youngsters.

Two of Kenya's famous cricketers, Maurice Odumbe & Steve Tikolo have played club cricket at Dhaka.
