= 1986 Asia Cup =

Cricket tournament in Sri Lanka

- Dates: 30 March – 6 April 1986
- Administrator: Asian Cricket Council
- Cricket format: One Day International
- Tournament format: Round-robin
- Host: Sri Lanka
- Champions: Sri Lanka (1st title)
- Runners-up: Pakistan
- Participants: 3
- Matches: 4
- Player of the series: (Sri Lanka) Arjuna Ranatunga
- Most runs: (Sri Lanka) Arjuna Ranatunga (105)
- Most wickets: (Pakistan) Abdul Qadir (9)

The 1986 Asia Cup (also known as the John Player Asia Cup 86) was the second Asia Cup tournament, and was held in Sri Lanka between March 30 and April 6. Three teams took part in the tournament: Pakistan, Sri Lanka and Asian leading associate member Bangladesh. India pulled out of the tournament due to strained cricketing relations with Sri Lanka and was replaced by Asian leading associate nation Bangladesh, which had qualified by winning the 1984 South-East Asia Cup.

The 1986 Asia Cup was a round-robin tournament where each team played the other once, and the top two teams qualifying for a place in the final. Pakistan won both its matches and qualified for the final against Sri Lanka. Sri Lanka beat Pakistan to win their first Asia Cup.

== 1984 South-East Asia Cup ==
The First South-East Asian Cricket Tournament was held in Dhaka in January 1984. Two teams from the host country were joined by teams from Singapore and Hong Kong. The Bangladesh national team won the trophy, and thus qualified for the 1986 Asia Cup in Sri Lanka.

The organizers suffered an early setback when Malaysia, one of the stronger cricketing nations of the Far East, withdrew at the last moment. Apart from Dhaka, Chittagong and Mymensingh hosted some games. The Bangladesh national team, however, played all its fixtures at the capital.

== Squads ==
Squads
Sri Lanka	Pakistan	Bangladesh
Duleep Mendis (c)	Imran Khan (c)	Gazi Ashraf (c)
Brendon Kuruppu (wk)	Mudassar Nazar	Raqibul Hasan
Roshan Mahanama	Mohsin Khan	Nurul Abedin
Asanka Gurusinha	Ramiz Raja	Minhajul Abedin
Roy Dias	Javed Miandad	Shaheedur Rahman
Arjuna Ranatunga	Qasim Umar	Rafiqul Alam
Aravinda de Silva	Manzoor Elahi	Golam Faruq
Ravi Ratnayeke	Abdul Qadir	Jahangir Shah
Ashantha de Mel	Wasim Akram	Hafizur Rahman (wk)
Don Anurasiri	Zulqarnain (wk)	Gholam Nousher
Kaushik Amalean	Zakir Khan	Samiur Rahman
Athula Samarasekera	Saleem Malik	-

== Matches ==
=== Group stage ===
Pos	Team	Pld	W	L	NR	Pts	NRR	Qualification
1	Pakistan	2	2	0	0	8	3.823	Advanced to the Final
2	Sri Lanka (H)	2	1	1	0	4	3.796	Advanced to the Final
3	Bangladesh	2	0	2	0	0	2.795	Eliminated

Source: ESPN Cricinfo
(H) Host

30 March 1986
Scorecard

Pakistan; 197 (45 overs)	v	Sri Lanka; 116 (33.5 overs)
Mohsin Khan 39 (46); Ravi Ratnayeke 3/32 (9 overs)		Brendon Kuruppu 34 (56); Manzoor Elahi 3/22 (9 overs)

Pakistan won by 81 runs
Paikiasothy Saravanamuttu Stadium, Colombo
Umpires: Dickie Bird and David Shepherd
Player of the match: Mohsin Khan (Pak)

31 March 1986
Scorecard

Bangladesh; 94 (35.3 overs)	v	Pakistan; 98/3 (32.1 overs)
Shaheedur Rahman 37 (60); Wasim Akram 4/19 (9 overs)		Mudassar Nazar 47 (97); Jahangir Shah 2/23 (9 overs)

Pakistan won by 7 wickets
Tyronne Fernando Stadium, Moratuwa
Umpires: Herbi Felsinger and PW Vidanagamage
Player of the match: Wasim Akram (Pak)

2 April 1986
Scorecard

Bangladesh; 131/8 (45 overs)	v	Sri Lanka; 132/3 (31.3 overs)
Minhajul Abedin 40 (63); Kaushik Amalean 2/15 (9 overs)		Asanka Gurusinha 44 (91); Golam Faruq 1/22 (8.3 overs)

Sri Lanka won by 7 wickets
Asgiriya Stadium, Kandy
Umpires: Mahboob Shah and David Shepherd
Player of the match: Asanka Gurusinha (SL)

=== Final ===
6 April 1986
Scorecard

Pakistan; 191/9 (45 overs)	v	Sri Lanka; 195/5 (42.2 overs)
Javed Miandad 67 (100); Kaushik Amalean 4/46 (9 overs)		Arjuna Ranatunga 57 (55); Abdul Qadir 3/32 (9 overs)

Sri Lanka won by 5 wickets
Sinhalese Sports Club Ground, Colombo
Umpires: Dickie Bird and David Shepherd
Player of the match: Javed Miandad (Pak)

== Statistics ==
=== Most runs ===
Player	Matches	Innings	NO	Runs	Average	SR	HS	100	50
(Sri Lanka) Arjuna Ranatunga	3	3	1	105	52.50	92.10	57	0	1
(Pakistan) Javed Miandad	3	3	0	91	30.33	61.48	67	0	1
(Pakistan) Mohsin Khan	3	3	0	74	24.66	64.91	39	0	0
(Sri Lanka) Brendon Kuruppu	3	3	0	67	22.33	59.29	34	0	0
(Sri Lanka) Aravinda de Silva	3	2	0	64	32.00	66.66	52	0	1
(Bangladesh) Shaheedur Rahman	2	2	0	62	31.00	57.41	37	0	0
Source: Cricinfo

=== Most wickets ===
Player	Matches	Innings	Wickets	Overs	Econ.	Ave.	BBI	S/R	4WI	5WI
(Pakistan) Abdul Qadir	3	3	9	24.2	2.91	7.88	3/15	16.2	0	0
(Sri Lanka) Kaushik Amalean	3	3	7	25.0	3.64	13.00	4/46	21.4	1	0
(Sri Lanka) Ravi Ratnayeke	3	3	7	26.0	4.73	17.57	3/32	22.22	0	0
(Pakistan) Wasim Akram	3	3	4	22.2	2.59	14.50	4/19	33.50	1	0
(Pakistan) Manzoor Elahi	3	3	4	23.0	3.04	17.50	3/22	34.50	0	0
(Sri Lanka) Arjuna Ranatunga	3	3	4	27.0	3.00	20.25	2/17	40.50	0	0
(Pakistan) Zakir Khan	3	3	4	19.0	5.10	24.25	3/34	28.50	0	0
Source: Cricinfo

== See also ==
- Asia Cup
