= Farooq Kirmani =

Cricketer

Personal information
- Born: 1 June 1955; Karachi, Pakistan
- Batting: Right-handed
- Bowling: Right-arm off-spin

International information
- National side: Canada (1982–1991)

Domestic team information
- Years: Team
- 1972–1974: Karachi Whites
- 1974: Karachi Blues
- 1974–1975: Sindh
- Source: CricketArchive, 8 March 2016

Farooq Kirmani (born 1 June 1955) is a former international cricketer who represented the Canadian national team between 1982 and 1991. He was born in Pakistan and played at first-class level there before emigrating to Canada.

A right-handed middle-order batsman, Kirmani made his first-class debut in February 1972. At the age of 16, he was playing for the Karachi Whites in the BCCP Patron's Trophy. He scored a maiden half-century the following season, making 76 not out against the Public Works Department. In May 1974, Kirmani played a single match for the Karachi Blues in the Kardar Summer Shield, a knock-out competition. He returned to the Karachi Whites for the next edition of the Patron's Trophy, and later in the 1974–75 season represented Sindh in the Pentangular Trophy, a one-off event played in Lahore. Kirmani's final first-class appearance came in January 1975, when he played a game for Sindh B in the Quaid-i-Azam Trophy.

After emigrating to Canada, Kirmani made his international debut at the 1982 ICC Trophy in England. He finished with 122 runs from his three innings, making against Kenya his team's highest score of the tournament, 107 runs. At the 1986 edition of the tournament, Kirmani scored 191 runs, behind only Paul Prashad and Ron Dipchand for Canada. He made two half-centuries, scoring 51 against Hong Kong and 57 against Israel. For the 1990 ICC Trophy, Kirmani was appointed Canada's captain, replacing Clement Neblett from the previous event. Neither he nor his team had much success – Canada were knocked out in the second round, winning only half of their six matches overall, and Kirmani made only 90 runs in six innings. He played his last match for Canada the following year, aged 36, appearing against the United States in Calgary.
