= Nurul Abedin =

Bangladeshi cricketer (born 1964)

Personal information
- Full name: Nurul Abedin Nobel
- Born: 7 September 1964 (age 62); Chittagong, East Pakistan
- Batting: Right-handed
- Bowling: Right-arm medium
- Relatives: Minhajul Abedin (brother)

International information
- National side: Bangladesh
- ODI debut (cap 7): 31 March 1986 v Pakistan
- Last ODI: 31 December 1990 v Sri Lanka
- Source: ESPNcricinfo, 13 February 2006

Nurul Abedin (Bengali: নুরুল আবেদীন নোবেল; born 7 September 1964) is a Bangladeshi former cricketer, who played in four One Day Internationals from 1986 to 1990.

Nurul Abedin is the elder brother of retired international cricketer Minhajul Abedin (Nannu). Originally from Chittagong, the brothers were prominent figures in Dhaka cricket, in the 80s and 90s. In the international arena, Nobel was in and out of the national side. Though no less gifted than his brother, he had to suffer for the whims of the selectors. Still, he opened the innings in Bangladesh's very first ODI against Pakistan in 1986. A week before the tournament, he had scored a memorable 102 against Pakistan Zone A. There, he had put on 135 for the second wicket with the skipper Gazi Ashraf Hossain. Against a stronger zone C side, he had scored 50, sharing a century opening stand with the veteran Raqibul Hasan.

His best performance came in the 1990 ICC Trophy in Netherlands. His 85 against Denmark and 105 against Canada helped Bangladesh reach the semi-finals. Overall, in 5 matches he scored a total of 235 runs at an average of 47.00.
