= Yousuf Babu =

Bangladeshi cricketer

Yousuf Rahman (more commonly known as Yousuf Babu) is a Bangladeshi cricketer, who played regularly for the national side from 1976-77 until his retirement in 1983–84. He top scored with 78 against the MCC at Dhaka in January 1977. He was the first Bangladeshi to score an international hundred, with 115 against PNG in 1982. In the early part of his career, he used to bat in the middle order, but from 1979 to 1980 season onwards he was a regular opener. He was also a useful medium pacer.

== Hero of Dhaka ==
In 7–9 January 1977, Bangladesh played against the MCC at Dhaka. After winning the toss, the home side captain Shamim Kabir decided to bat first. Yet, midway through the day, Bangladesh were struggling at 145/6. Only the skipper with 30, and the ever-reliable Omar Khaled Rumy with 28 showed any resistance. Coming on to bat at no 8, Yousuf Babu changed the course of the innings. After sharing a partnership with Faruk (35), he got the tail to support him, and they took the score to 266/9 (Decl). His 78 was the highest score of the match for either side.

He was always successful in international matches at Dhaka. A year later, against a very strong Lankan bowling attack, he scored 37 & 41*. Most of the other batsman around him collapsed against the varied attack of the Lankans. In February 1978, he scored 30 against the visiting Decan Blues side. In 1980–81, he scored a half-century against the MCC at Dhaka. During January 1984, he was consistently among the runs against the relatively weaker oppositions in the South East Asian Cricket Cup. His highest 69* came against HongKong. Quite appropriately, he retired from international cricket at Dhaka after playing against the Hyderabad Blues side in the 1983–84 season. And he finished with a bang, scoring 35 and 44.

== In ICC Trophy ==
He had a disappointing ICC Trophy in 1979, scoring just 30 runs in 3 innings, and failing to take any wicket. He, however, topped the batting averages of his side in 1982, thanks mainly to his hundred against PNG. His hundred came before lunch, and along with Nazeem Siraji (52) he gave the innings a solid beginning. Unfortunately, there was a late-order collapse and PNG won the match by 3 wickets. Overall, he finished with 214 runs at an average of 35.66. In the low-scoring game against East Africa, he became the unlikely hero with the ball taking 3/16.

		Batting				Bowling			
Year	Matches	Runs	Average	High Score	100 / 50	Runs	Wickets	Average	Best
1979	3	30	10.00	21	0/0	49	0	-	-
1982	6	214	35.67	115	1/0	65	3	21.67	3/16
Overall	9	244	27.11	115	1/0	114	3	38.00	3/16

== As a bowler ==
Apart from his success against East Africa, there had been a number of other occasions when Yousuf Babu had contributed with the ball. Just days after hitting 78 against the MCC, he showed the tourists that he could bowl as well as bat, taking 4/37 at Jessore, while playing for the South Zone. He took 3/59 against Sri Lanka at Chittagong in 1978. His best effort in one day cricket came against Dilip Doshi's West Bengal side, at Dhaka (in 1983). His 3/18 helped the local side bowl the opposition out for only 175 runs. The following year, during the tour of Kenya, he failed with the bat, but emerged as his team's most successful bowler. (12 wickets at 17.42 runs)

His younger brother Samiur Rahman was also a cricketer. He represented Bangladesh in two ODIs and two ICC Trophy tournaments.
