= Amalean =

Amalean is a surname. Notable people with the surname include:

- Kaushik Amalean (born 1965), Sri Lankan cricketer
- Mahesh Amalean (born 1955), Sri Lankan engineer
