= Sujan Mukherjee =

Sujan Mukherjee may refer to:

- Sujan Mukherjee (cricketer) (born 1955), Indian cricketer
- Sujan Mukherjee (actor), Indian actor
