= Raqibul Hasan =

Raqibul Hasan may refer to:

- Raqibul Hasan (cricketer, born 1953), captained Bangladesh in the ICC Trophy in 1979 and was 12th man for Pakistan in a Test in 1969–1970
- Raqibul Hasan (cricketer, born 1987), appears for Bangladesh in Test and ODI cricket
- Rakibul Hasan (born 1988), Bangladeshi-born Italian cricketer who represents the Italy cricket team
- Rakibul Hasan (cricketer, born 2002), Bangladeshi cricketer
