= Colin Robertson (cricketer) =

Zimbabwean cricketer

Personal information
- Full name: Colin Michael Robertson
- Born: 4 May 1963 (age 63); Gatooma, Southern Rhodesia
- Batting: Right-handed
- Role: Batsman
- Relatives: Ryan Higgins (nephew); Dylan Higgins (nephew)

International information
- National side: Zimbabwe (1982–1990)
- Source: CricketArchive, 9 March 2016

Colin Michael Robertson (born 4 May 1963) is a former Zimbabwean international cricketer who represented the Zimbabwean national team between 1982 and 1990. He played as a right-handed top-order batsman.

Robertson made his senior debut for Zimbabwe in October 1982, playing a series of first-class and limited-overs fixtures against the touring Sri Lankans. His first international tournament was the 1986 ICC Trophy in England, which Zimbabwe won to qualify for the 1987 World Cup. He played in four of his team's eight matches, but scored only 56 runs, with a best of 26 against Bangladesh. In October 1988, when a New Zealand Young Internationals team toured, Robertson struck a vein of form, scoring 74 not out and 70 not out, respectively, in the first and third games of a five-match limited-overs series. The first of those innings was to be his highest in List A cricket. Robertson's highest first-class score was made on a 1990 tour of England, when he scored 125 against Lancashire. Later in the year, he was selected for the 1990 ICC Trophy in the Netherlands, although he played only a single match at the tournament (against Singapore). That game was his last international appearance. Robertson remained involved in Zimbabwean domestic cricket for several more seasons, and in early 1994 played for the Mashonaland Country Districts in the 1993–94 Logan Cup (the first edition of the competition to hold first-class status). He was 30 years old at the time of his last first-class appearance.
