= Ziaul Islam =

Bangladeshi cricketer (1952–2014)

Personal information
- Born: October 1952

Ziaul Islam Masud (October 1952 in Pabna – July 2014 in Dhaka) was a Bangladeshi ICC Trophy cricketer. A tall right-arm fast bowler, he represented Bangladesh in the 1979 ICC Trophy in England. During the late 1970s and early 1980s he enjoyed the reputation of being the fastest bowler in Bangladesh and the first International wicket-taker for Bangladesh.

Masud led the new ball attack for Bangladesh in the 1st ICC trophy. There he took 5 wickets for 102 runs. In the 1st match against Fiji, he took 2/17; there he dismissed the Fiji openers. This was his best bowling in the tournament.

== Other international matches ==
Masud played for the Bangladesh team against MCC in 1978–1979 season. But in slow turning pitches he enjoyed little success. He also played a crucial part in winning the South Asian Cricket Championship title in Hong Kong in 1988.

== As a batsman ==
Though he was mainly a bowler, he was quite a useful lower order batsman. In the ICC trophy, in 1979, he scored 11 against Fiji, sharing a vital 23 run partnership for the last wicket with Dipu Chowdhury. Later, against the Danes, Masud remained unbeaten on 15.

In Domestic League he scored an unbeaten century against Udity Club in 1979. It does prove that he was a good all-rounder, and throughout his domestic cricket career he scored some runs whenever he got an opportunity to bat.

== Domestic cricket ==
He played most of his domestic cricket with Mohammedan SC. Though his last international match was in early 1983, against the touring WB team led by Dilip Doshi, he remained a prominent figure in the domestic cricket throughout the 1980s. He was regarded as one of the top cricketers in the domestic league. He plied his trades with Dhaka Wanderers Club, Mohammedan Sporting Club and Azad Boys’ Club.
