= Omar Khaled =

Bangladeshi Writer

Omar Khalid Rumi ওমর খালেদ রুমি
- Born: Omar Khalid Rumi; January 1950 (age 76)
- Education: University of Rajshahi
- Occupations: Cricketer and Musician

Omar Khalid Rumi (commonly known as Rumi, January 1950) is a Bangladeshi cricketer and a musician. A middle order batsman and a leg spin googly bowler, he played regularly for the national side between 1976–77 and 1983–84.

== Education ==
Omar khalid Rumi graduated from University of Rajshahi where he played cricket. While studying at University of Rajshahi the MCC made its maiden tour to Bangladesh, shortly after Christmas in 1976. He was picked in the North Zone team that played against MCC in the first match of their tour. He made 27 and took one wicket.

== As a batsman ==
Playing for the North Zone side against the MCC at Rajshahi in 1976–77, he top scored in the first innings for his side scoring 27. Then at Dhaka he scored 28 and 32. He continued to be a regular run-getter for his side until his retirement. Yet, he failed time and again, to convert starts into scores. Too often, he got out between 20 and 35, after doing all the hard work. Lack of concentration was the main factor, although his poor running between the wickets didn't help his cause either. Nevertheless, two innings of his are worth mentioning here.

In early February 1978, a Decan Blues side led by the former Indian captain Ajit Wadekar came to Dhaka (on their way home from a tour of the Far East). They played a 3-day match against the local side. This game was important for the local side as they sought to regain some of their lost confidence following a disastrous home series against Sri Lanka.

Batting first, the tourists scored 410/7, (Ajit Wadekar 103*, M.V. Narasimha Rao 83). In reply, the local side was in immediate trouble losing their openers cheaply. Rumy, batting at his usual No. 3 position, decided to take the bull by the horns. After playing one over calmly, he blasted three fours in the next. Skipper Raquibul Hasan, batting at the other end was a mere spectator. Rumy only scored 32 before falling to the guile of M. V. Narasimha Rao. (Rao, the Hyderabad allrounder, was at that time on the verge of playing for the Indian test team.) But it was the best innings of the match. After Rumy's departure, Raquibul Hasan batted diligently to score 64, and Bangladesh saved the match by scoring 320 in the 1st innings. After the end of the tour, the opposition captain Ajit Wadekar described Rumy as the best Bangladeshi batsman.

The setting for his other memorable innings was the water Orton cricket ground in the English Midlands. It was Bangladesh's first ever international match abroad, against Fiji. On difficult conditions, Rumy scored a patient 28. None of the other top order batsman reached double figures, and it was only the tail enders who took the score past the 100 mark. Rumy's effort was overshadowed by the brilliant bowling of Syed Ashraful Haque (7/23) which helped Bangladesh win the match. But Rumy's contribution to the victory should not be underestimated.

== As a bowler ==
A genuine all rounder, Rumy, apart from being a top order batsman, was the country's best leg spin bowler. His height helped him get extra bounce, and he had a well disguised googly. He had a highly successful spin combination with Syed Ashraful Haque and Lintu. The trio was in full flow at Dhaka, against the MCC in 1978–79. They bowled the tourists out for only 210, with Lintu taking 3/70, Rumy 3/63 and Ashraful 2/1. Earlier, at Jessore, Rumy with 4/30 and Lintu with 4/49 had bowled out the MCC for only 166. Against Hyderabad Blues, in 1983–84, he took 2 wickets, and along with the off spinner Azhar (4 wickets) restricted the strong Hyderabad batting line up to 280/9.

== As Musician ==
Rumi developed an interest in music during a visit to Dhaka in 1965, when he was inspired by a performance by the band Iolytes, which later changed its name to the Windy Side of Care. His early musical training included playing the tabla and banjo before he took up the guitar. He later cited Deep Purple, Carlos Santana and Steve Vai among his musical influences and emphasized the importance of listening to different genres, including classical music, in developing a distinctive musical style. While pursuing his cricket career, Rumi also performed music. During the Marylebone Cricket Club's 1976–77 tour of Bangladesh, he was invited to perform on stage and sang "Take Me Home, Country Roads". His performance and English-language singing became known among his cricketing colleagues, and former Bangladesh teammate Jahangir Shah gave him the nickname "Country Road". Rumi also played guitar during Bangladesh's 1982 tour of England, using a guitar borrowed at a pub. After his final appearance in the 1984 South East Asia cricket tournament, Rumi gradually shifted his focus towards music. He joined the Renaissance (Bangladeshi band) around 1985–86 and subsequently performed with several bands over the following two decades, including the Windy Side of Care. In 1997, Rumi formed the band Bangladesh. His daughter Fariba Omar joined the band in 1999. The band primarily performs Western rock and pop music.

== ICC Trophy performances ==
		Batting				Bowling			
Year	Matches	Runs	Average	High Score	100 / 50	Runs	Wickets	Average	Best
1979	4	59	14.75	28	0/0	44	2	22.00	1/18
1982	7	107	17.83	25	0/0	151	6	25.16	2/35
Overall	11	166	16.60	28	0/0	195	8	24.38	2/35

== In domestic cricket ==
He played most of his League cricket at Dhaka with Abahani KC and Bangladesh Biman. In 1976–77, he played a big part in Abahani winning the League title. In the final (against Victoria SC), he took five wickets with the ball, and then followed it with an unbeaten half century. Late in his career, in the 1983–84 National final, he took seven wickets with the ball against a strong Dhaka University batting line up.
