= Teddy Foster =

Barbadian-born American cricketer

Personal information
- Full name: Teddy Fernando Foster
- Born: May 5, 1955 (age 71); Saint Michael Parish, Barbados
- Batting: Right-handed
- Bowling: Left-arm orthodox

International information
- National side: United States (1985–1986)

Domestic team information
- Years: Team
- 1976–1981: Barbados (West Indies)
- Source: CricketArchive, 8 March 2016

Teddy Fernando Foster (born 5 May 1955) is a former international cricketer who represented the American national team at the 1986 ICC Trophy. He was born in Barbados, and before emigrating to the U.S. represented the Barbadian national team in West Indian domestic cricket.

Educated at The Lodge School, Foster made his first-class debut for Barbados in January 1976, playing against Trinidad and Tobago in the Shell Shield. A left-arm orthodox bowler, he made semi-regular appearances for Barbados over the following six seasons, both in the Shell Shield and in the regional limited-overs tournament. Foster's best first-class bowling figures, 3/27, came against the Combined Islands in March 1979. He also made his highest first-class score against that team, scoring 62 runs against them in January 1978 (from seventh in the batting order). After emigrating to the U.S., Foster made his international debut in 1985, in a triangular tournament featuring Bermuda and Canada. At the 1986 ICC Trophy in England, he played in seven of his team's eight matches. He finished with 10 wickets, the second-most for his team, which included 3/38 against Bermuda and 3/45 against Papua New Guinea. He also scored 165 runs (the fifth-most for his team), with a best of 41 not out against Gibraltar.
