= Christopher Cox (cricketer) =

Zimbabwean cricketer

Personal information
- Full name: Christopher James Cox
- Born: 14 May 1962 (age 64); Umtali, Southern Rhodesia
- Batting: Right-handed
- Bowling: Left-arm orthodox

International information
- National side: Zimbabwe (1986)
- Source: CricketArchive, 21 February 2016

Christopher James Cox (born 14 May 1962) is a former Zimbabwean international cricketer who played several games for Zimbabwe in 1986. He played as a left-arm orthodox bowler.

Born in Umtali (present-day Mutare), Cox debuted for Zimbabwe B during the 1980–81 season, appearing twice in three-day fixtures against Kenya. He made his senior debut for Zimbabwe in April 1986, playing one-day and first-class fixtures against New South Wales (a touring Australian state team). The following month, Cox was named in Zimbabwe's squad for the 1986 ICC Trophy in England. He played only a single match at the tournament, against East Africa, but did feature in a one-day tour game against Northamptonshire. Cox's final appearance for Zimbabwe came in October 1986, against a touring West Indies B side. He remained in competition for national selection for at least another season, however, playing first-class matches for Zimbabwe B in March 1987 and March 1988 (against Pakistan B and Sri Lanka B, respectively).
