= Hitesh Mehta =

Kenyan cricketer and architect

Personal information
- Full name: Hitesh Sukhlal Mehta
- Born: 1959 (age 66–67); Nairobi, Kenya Colony
- Batting: Right-handed
- Bowling: Right-arm off break

Career statistics
| Competition | First-class |
|---|---|
| Matches | 1 |
| Runs scored | 56 |
| Batting average | 28.00 |
| 100s/50s | –/– |
| Top score | 33 |
| Balls bowled | 162 |
| Wickets | 3 |
| Bowling average | 31.66 |
| 5 wickets in innings | – |
| 10 wickets in match | – |
| Best bowling | 3/72 |
| Catches/stumpings | 1/– |
- Source: Cricinfo, 20 September 2021

Hitesh Sukhlal Mehta (born 1959) is a Kenyan architect and former first-class cricketer.

Mehta was born to an Indian family in Nairobi in 1959. He represented the East Africa cricket team in four matches in the 1979 ICC Trophy, before going on to represent the Kenya national cricket team in the 1982 and 1986 competitions, representing Kenya in twelve ICC Trophy matches. He also made one appearance in first-class cricket for Kenya against the touring Pakistan Starlets at Nairobi in 1986. Batting twice in the match, he was dismissed for 33 runs in the Kenyan first innings by Nadeem Ghauri, while in their second innings he was dismissed for 23 runs by Mohsin Kamal. With his right-arm off break bowling, he took 3 wickets for 72 runs in the Starlets first innings. Alongside his cricket career, Mehta worked as an eco-architect and was featured in National Geographic Adventure, which identified him as one of five sustainable tourism pioneers in the world in 2006. He wrote a book on ecolodges in 2010, Authentic Ecolodges, which was published by HarperCollins.
