= Gary Wallace =

Zimbabwean cricketer (born 1958)

Personal information
- Full name: Gary Charles Wallace
- Born: 8 February 1958 (age 68); Salisbury, Rhodesia
- Batting: Left-handed
- Bowling: Left-arm medium
- Role: Batsman

Domestic team information
- Years: Team
- 1978–1980: Rhodesia
- 1980–1986: Zimbabwe
- Source: ESPNcricinfo, 2 May 2016

Gary Charles Wallace (born 8 February 1958) is a Zimbabwean first-class cricketer who played for Rhodesia cricket team from 1978 to 1980 then for Zimbabwe cricket team from 1980 to 1986 including in 1982 ICC Trophy and 1986 ICC Trophy. He played as a left-handed batsman.
