= 1982 ICC Trophy =

International cricket tournament

- Dates: 16 June – 10 July 1982
- Administrator: International Cricket Council
- Cricket format: Limited overs cricket
- Tournament format(s): Round-robin and Knockout
- Host: England
- Champions: Zimbabwe (1st title)
- Runners-up: Bermuda
- Participants: 16
- Most runs: (Bermuda) Colin Blades (310)
- Most wickets: (Bermuda) Elvin James (15)

The 1982 ICC Trophy was a limited-overs cricket tournament held in England between 16 June and 10 July 1982. It was the second ICC Trophy tournament to be staged, with matches between the 16 participating teams played over 60 overs a team and with white clothing and red balls. As in the 1979 tournament, all matches were played in the Midlands, though on this occasion the final was held at Grace Road, Leicester.

The tournament served as the Cricket World Cup qualification process – Zimbabwe, who didn't play in the first tournament, defeated Bermuda in the final to qualify for the 1983 World Cup. Bad weather hampered the tournament throughout, with many games called off early or abandoned entirely because of rain; West Africa suffered the most, seeing a result in only two of their seven group matches.

Sri Lanka, who won the first tournament in 1979, had by now been promoted to Full Test and ODI status, and so did not take part, and automatically qualified for the World Cup. As a result, only one spot was on offer to join the seven Full members in the World Cup which was won by Zimbabwe.

== Competition format ==
The 16 teams were divided into two groups of eight. Each teams played each other team in its group once in matches played between 16 June and 5 July, scoring four points for a win and two for a no-result (match started but not finished) or abandoned entirely without a ball being bowled. The top two teams in each group went forward to the semi-finals, the top team (With the highest number of points) in one group playing the runner-up from the other group. Where teams finished with equal points totals, first the number of games won and secondly run rate was used to separate them.

== Teams ==
Group A	Group B
Canada; Gibraltar; Israel; Hong Kong; Kenya; Papua New Guinea; United States; Zimbabwe	Bangladesh; Bermuda; East Africa; Fiji; Malaysia; Netherlands; Singapore; West Africa

== League Stage ==
=== Group A ===
Pos	Team	Pld	W	L	NR	Pts	RR
1	Zimbabwe	7	5	0	2	24	5.484
2	Papua New Guinea	7	4	2	1	18	3.896
3	Canada	7	3	1	3	18	3.803
4	Kenya	7	3	2	2	16	3.362
5	Hong Kong	7	2	3	2	12	3.027
6	United States	7	1	2	4	12	3.615
7	Gibraltar	7	0	3	4	8	2.381
8	Israel	7	0	5	2	4	2.718

Source: CricketArchive

Advanced to Semi-finals

==== 16 June ====
Kenya recorded an easy nine-wicket win over Gibraltar. The Europeans were dismissed for just 80 (RCR Patel 3–13) and their opponents rushed to victory in 14.2 overs, with Rehmann making 53 not out. In a low-scoring match, Papua New Guinea beat Hong Kong by four wickets. The young Dermot Reeve made 38 for Hong Kong and took 2-26, but the Papuans overhauled their target of 100 with 34.4 overs in hand. Elsewhere, Zimbabwe crushed the US by 191 runs, thanks to a second-wicket partnership of 214 between David Houghton (135) and Kevin Curran (126 not out) that set them on their way to 332/4. The Americans were never remotely in the hunt, and 4-34 from Peter Rawson restricted their total to just 141.

==== 18 June ====
Gibraltar were in trouble at 42/4 against the United States, Shamshad Durrani having taken 3–12, before the rains came and put paid to any chance of a result. In a match reduced to 45 overs a team, Hong Kong's 207/7 (Andy Lorimer 53) was good enough, though Nissam Reuben's 6-2-7-3 was noteworthy, and the Israelis collapsed to 84 all out. In an all-African affair reduced to a 25-over game, Zimbabwe posted a highly competitive 192/4 (Houghton 71, Jack Heron 50) which Kenya never got anywhere near, making just 72/4 to lose by 120 runs.

==== 21 June ====
The game between Gibraltar and Zimbabwe saw no play at all, and nor did the matches between Kenya and the USA or between Canada and Hong Kong. The other game did produce a result, however, with Israel recovering from the depths of 32/5 to post a reasonable-looking 167/9, bolstered by 75 not out from Stanley Perlman. Despite losing an early wicket, however, the Papuans cantered to a nine-wicket win as Nigel Robert Agonia (86 not out) and Taunao Vai (75 not out) added an unbroken 157 for the second wicket.

==== 23 June ====
Israel were in dire straits at 74/6 against Kenya when the weather intervened, but that was the only action on this day, with Canada v Gibraltar and Papua New Guinea v the USA seeing not a ball bowled between them.

==== 25 June ====
Yet another rain-affected day saw no match reach a positive result. Canada had made 8/0 from nine overs against Zimbabwe when the players left the field, while Gibraltar reached 42/2 against Israel from ten. There was no play at all between Hong Kong and the United States.

==== 28 June ====
At last the weather held off for long enough to allow all three matches to reach a conclusion, albeit from a reduced number of overs. In a 55-over game, Papua New Guinea won against the odds by 30 runs against Canada, an unbeaten 101 from Vavine Pala guiding them to 231/7 from 83/6 while K Kalo took 4–26 as the Canadians could manage only 211 despite 50 from Tariq Javed. Gibraltar's 129/8 off 40 overs (Gordon Bacon 4-37) proved well short of what was required, as Des Greenwood and Reeve both made unbeaten scores of 56 to guide Hong Kong to an eight-wicket triumph. Finally, Israel slumped to 65 all out against Zimbabwe, with only Perlman reaching double figures and John Traicos taking 4-22. In reply the Africans scorched to a nine-wicket victory from a mere 7.3 overs, Houghton making 43.

==== 30 June ====
The North American derby produced a comprehensive 138-run win for Canada, who compiled 233 (Tariq Javed 68) before captain RJ Stevens took 4–26 as the USA could manage just 95 all out. Hong Kong dived to 47/7 before recovering to 105, but 39 not out from Hitesh Mehta saw Kenya home by three wickets. Finally, Papua New Guinea could manage only 94 in their game against Zimbabwe, and Houghton (44 not out) and Curran (30 not out) ensured a simple nine-wicket victory for the African team.

==== 2 July ====
An innings of 107 by IF Kirmani enabled Canada to make 242/8 against Kenya, and despite 53 from GA Musa 4-26 from Clement Neblett meant that the Africans fell 45 runs short. Gibraltar made a mere 55, the lowest total of the tournament, against Papua New Guinea with Pala taking 4-30, and the Papuans made short work of their target as they cruised to a nine-wicket win. Against the United States, Israel made a creditable 157, but NS Lashkari (76 not out) and Kamran Rasheed (65 not out) guided the Americans to a comfortable eight-wicket triumph.

==== 5 July ====
Canada won by a walk-over after Israel were unable to field a team due to a dispute between the players and management, but the teams decided to play a friendly match the following morning, which the Canadians won by three wickets. Elsewhere, 72 not out from Andy Lorimer contributed to a Hong Kong total of 192/4, which proved insufficient against Zimbabwe as their opponents won by seven wickets, future Test player Andy Pycroft hitting 83 not out and Heron 51. Kenya's total of 210/8 (Mehta 52) was too much for Papua New Guinea, for whom W Maha with 61 was the only man to pass 32; the Papuans were bowled out for 173 to lose by 37 runs.

=== Group B ===
Pos	Team	Pld	W	L	NR	Pts	RR
1	Bermuda	7	6	0	1	26	5.267
2	Bangladesh	7	4	1	2	20	3.225
3	Netherlands	7	3	1	3	18	3.604
4	Singapore	7	1	2	4	12	2.997
5	Fiji	7	1	3	3	10	3.479
6	East Africa	7	1	3	3	10	2.766
7	West Africa	7	0	2	5	10	3.611
8	Malaysia	7	0	4	3	6	2.997

Source: CricketArchive

Advanced to Semi-finals

==== 16 June ====
Despite having five men run out, Bangladesh compiled 246 (Gazi Ashraf 77) against West Africa, and this proved more than enough as their opponents fell to 96/7 before a late-innings rally from S Elliott (38) restored some respectability to leave them 76 runs short on 170/9. A hopelessly one-sided game saw Bermuda amass 348/9 against Malaysia, with Gladstone Brown (100) and Winston Reid (128) sharing an opening stand of 211. In reply, Banerji made a brave 34 but none of his team-mates reached double figures as the Malaysians were rolled over for just 64 to lose by 284 runs. Elvin James recorded astonishing bowling figures of 7.1-5-2-5 for Bermuda. And the Netherlands' 150/8 was sufficient to hold off East Africa (127) in a match that produced no fewer than 52 extras between the two teams.

==== 18 June ====
Rain destroyed any chance of meaningful play on this day. The matches between East Africa and Singapore and between the Netherlands and West Africa were abandoned without a ball being bowled, while the one game that did get underway saw Fiji reach 31/2 off 14 overs before a halt was called to proceedings.

==== 21 June ====
The match between the Netherlands and Singapore was abandoned with no play possible, but the other two games produced results. Bangladesh were restricted to 143 against East Africa thanks to William Bourne's 4-33, but no-one but Extras passed 20 in reply and Bangladesh won by 26 runs. Elsewhere, in a game reduced to a 20-over thrash, Bermuda's 153/5 (captain Colin Blades 45 not out) proved too much for Fiji, who could manage only 102/6 to lose by 51 runs.

==== 23 June ====
All three matches scheduled for this day - Bangladesh v Singapore, East Africa v Malaysia and Fiji v West Africa - were abandoned without a ball being bowled.

==== 25 June ====
The weather proved the only winner once more, as again all three games - Bangladesh v Fiji, Bermuda v the Netherlands and Singapore v West Africa - saw no play whatsoever.

==== 28 June ====
The most exciting of the four games scheduled for this day was a thrilling one-run victory in a 25-over match by Bangladesh over Malaysia. Raqibul Hasan made 35 in the Bangladeshi's 122/7, but Malaysia were closing on their target at 113/4 before two quick wickets fell; they ended just short on 121/6. Bermuda (116/4) beat Singapore (115) by six wickets thanks to 48 from Noel Gibbons after Winston Trott had claimed 4-27. Rain stopped play when Fiji were 79/2 in reply to the Netherlands' imposing 251/6, RJ Elferink hitting a fine 154 not out, but the Dutch had done enough to win on faster scoring rate. The East-West Africa clash was a disappointment, however, being called off after East Africa had reached 53/2 from 25.1 overs.

==== 30 June ====
Bangladesh had a game to forget against Bermuda, being bowled out for 67 with only Nazim Shirazi reaching double figures as Lionel Thomas took 4–13. The Bermudians lost three wickets in reply, but were never really in trouble as they reached their target from 15.5 overs. An opening stand of 94 between KW Arnold (54) and DC Patel (52) laid the foundations for East Africa's 220/7 against Fiji, and 4-21 from Desai made sure of an 88-run victory. Malaysia put up 128 in an all-south-east-Asian clash with Singapore, but their opponents glided to a six-wicket win with more than 15 overs to spate thanks to a knock of 67 from FJR Martens.

==== 2 July ====
Bangladesh (167/4) beat the Netherlands (163) by six wickets in a match that saw no outstanding individual performances, the highest score Yousuf Rahman's 45. Scores of 68 from Thomas and 51 from Allan Douglas helped Bermuda to 240 in a 56-over game, and despite 64 from DC Patel, East Africa could manage no more than 176, 64 runs adrift. Finally, there was no result in the game between Malaysia and West Africa, the Malaysians having made 219/9 from 58 overs (S Elliott 75, J Onyechi 57; K Kamalanathan 4-45) when the players were forced from the field.

==== 5 July ====
West Africa batted well against Bermuda to post a total of 249, with Elliott making 67 and Onyechi 53 despite Elvin James' 4-41. An unbroken partnership of 125 between Brown (78 not out) and Blades (82 not out) settled the matter, however, as the Bermudians won by seven wickets with more than 11 overs in hand. M Rajalingham took 5-39 for Singapore to restrict Fiji to 219, but it was not quite enough as the Singaporeans were bowled out 14 runs short for 205. In the other match, a massive opening partnership of 257 between centurions Rene Schoonheim (117) and RE Lifmann (155 not out, the tournament's highest score) propelled the Netherlands to 301/3 and gave Malaysia no chance of victory, and the Asians were dismissed for 176 to give the Dutch a 125-run win.

== Semi-finals ==
=== Bangladesh v Zimbabwe ===
Batting first, Bangladesh stuttered to 45/4, and a fifth-wicket stand of 52 was in vain as 4-31 from Kevin Curran restricted the team to an inadequate 124. David Houghton fell for 1 in the Zimbabwean reply, but once Heron (63 not out) and Curran (44) had added 103 for the second wicket there was only one winner, and they reached their target with more than 30 overs to spare to record an easy eight-wicket victory.

=== Bermuda v Papua New Guinea ===
Papua New Guinea were in all sorts of trouble after collapsing to 48/6, but Pala stopped the rot with 72 and they eventually reached 153 before being bowled out in 39 overs. Despite losing Brown before a run had been scored, Bermuda ran out six-wicket winners despite losing three wickets for four runs at one stage. Blades hit 69 not out in an unbeaten hundred partnership with John Tucker.

== Third-place play-off - 9 July ==
Bangladesh put up a total of 224, thanks largely to an excellent 115 by Yousuf Rahman and 52 by Nazim Shirazi. From the commanding heights of 170/0, though, they lost all ten wickets for 54 runs (and their last six for 16) as La'a Aukopi returned outstanding figures of 5-14 from 11 overs. The Papuans were inspired by this to reach their target with three wickets and three overs remaining, W Maha hitting 60 in a three-wicket victory despite Bangladeshi captain and wicket-keeper Shafiq-ul-Haq making three stumpings in the innings.

== Final - 10 July ==
No batsman reached 50 in the Bermudian innings, but solid contributions from Brown (48), Blades (45) and Douglas (36) guided them to a reasonable 231/8 from their 60 overs. Duncan Fletcher was the pick of the Zimbabwean bowlers with 3-34 from nine overs. Zimbabwe looked in a spot of bother at 30/2 with both openers gone, but the match and the Trophy were decided by half-centuries from Andy Pycroft, who made 82, and Craig Hodgson (57 not out); the Africans won with more than five overs to spare.

== Statistics ==
=== Most runs ===
The top five run scorers (total runs) are included in this table.

Player	Team	Runs	Inns	Avg	Highest	100s	50s
Colin Blades	Bermuda	310	8	103.33	82*	0	2
David Houghton	Zimbabwe	308	7	51.33	135	1	1
Kevin Curran	Zimbabwe	276	7	92.00	126*	1	0
Winston Reid	Bermuda	257	8	32.12	128	1	0
Robert Lifmann	Netherlands	250	4	83.33	155*	1	0

Source: ESPNcricinfo

=== Most wickets ===
The top five wicket takers are listed in this table, listed by wickets taken and then by bowling average.

Player	Team	Overs	Wkts	Ave	SR	Econ	Best
Elvin James	Bermuda	66.0	15	12.46	26.40	2.83	5/2
Peter Rawson	Zimbabwe	68.1	14	12.64	29.21	2.59	4/34
Kila Kalo	Papua New Guinea	88.5	14	15.07	38.07	2.37	4/26
Winston Trott	Bermuda	69.0	13	11.84	31.84	2.23	4/27
Bipin Desai	East Africa	48.0	11	7.63	26.18	1.75	4/21

Source: ESPNcricinfo
