= Samiur Rahman =

Bangladeshi cricketer and umpire (1953–2022)

Personal information
- Born: 3 December 1953; Dacca, East Bengal, Pakistan
- Died: 19 April 2022 (aged 68); Dhaka, Bangladesh
- Batting: Right-handed
- Bowling: Right-arm fast-medium

International information
- National side: Bangladesh
- ODI debut (cap 10): 31 March 1986 v Pakistan
- Last ODI: 2 April 1986 v Sri Lanka

Career statistics
Competition	ODI
Matches	2
Runs scored	4
Batting average	2.00
100s/50s	0/0
Top score	4
Balls bowled	60
Wickets	0
Bowling average	–
5 wickets in innings	–
10 wickets in match	–
Best bowling	–
Catches/stumpings	1/–
- Source: Cricinfo, 19 April 2022

Samiur Rahman (3 December 1953 – 19 April 2022) was a Bangladeshi cricketer and umpire. He played for Bangladesh in its first-ever One Day International (ODI) game against Pakistan at Moratuwa, Sri Lanka in 1986 Asia Cup. He played in two ODIs. Apart from being a new ball swing bowler, he was also a useful lower order batsman. Like his brother, Yousuf Rahman (better known as Yousuf Babu), Sami was a regular for the national side in the first half of the 1980s.

== Career ==
Though Rahman was overlooked for the first ICC Trophy in 1979, he was a vital member of the side that finished fourth in 1982. He took seven wickets at 18.85 a piece. His best bowling, 3/31 came in the first match against West Africa. In 1986, Rahman played in only three matches taking three wickets.

Rahman was a Bangladesh Cricket Board (BCB) umpire of more than one hundred matches and served as a match referee in 25 T20 matches.

Rahman died on 19 April 2022, aged 66. He had been ill for two years having been diagnosed with a brain tumour and suffering from other health complications.
