= Allan Douglas (cricketer, born 1958) =

Bermudian cricketer (born 1958)

Personal information
- Full name: Allan Craig Douglas
- Born: 17 February 1958 (age 68); Somersall Road, Bermuda
- Batting: Right-handed
- Role: Wicket-keeper
- Relatives: Allan Douglas (son)

International information
- National side: Bermuda

Domestic team information
- Years: Team
- 1996/97: Bermuda

Career statistics
Competition	List A
Matches	2
Runs scored	12
Batting average	6.00
100s/50s	0/0
Top score	8
Catches/stumpings	0/1
- Source: CricketArchive, 13 October 2011

Allan Craig Douglas (born 17 February 1958) is a Bermudian former cricketer. He played as a right-handed batsman and a wicket-keeper. He played two List A matches for Bermuda in the 1996 Red Stripe Bowl. He also played in three ICC Trophy tournaments, including the 1982 event in which Bermuda finished as runners-up to Zimbabwe.
