= Palash Nandy =

Indian cricketer (born 1952)

Personal information
- Full name: Palash Nandy
- Born: 17 July 1952 (age 74); Calcutta, West Bengal, India
- Batting: Right-handed
- Bowling: Right-arm offbreak
- Role: Batsman

Domestic team information
- Years: Team
- 1969–1984: Bengal

Career statistics
Competition	FC	LA
Matches	57	7
Runs scored	3,208	108
Batting average	41.12	18.00
100s/50s	9/	0/1
Top score	205*	69
Balls bowled		24
Wickets	8	0
Bowling average	56.50
5 wickets in innings	0	0
10 wickets in match	0	0
Best bowling	2/17
Catches/stumpings	45/-	1/-
- Source: Cricinfo, 15 December 2013

Palash Nandy (born 17 July 1952) is a retired Indian cricketer. He was a right-handed batsman and right-arm offbreak bowler. He represented Bengal in first-class cricket and limited overs cricket matches. He had also captained the Bengal team during his playing days and had coached the same team after his retirement. He has been awarded the Life Time Achievement Award By CAB(Cricket Association of Bengal).
