= Raja Venkat =

Indian cricketer (born 1958)

Raja Venkatraman
Personal information
- Born: 7 September 1958 (age 68); Bombay, Maharashtra, India
- Batting: Left-handed
- Role: Batsman

Domestic team information
- Years: Team
- 1980/81–1991/92: Bengal

Career statistics
Competition	FC	List A
Matches	41	8
Runs scored	2,261	124
Batting average	44.33	15.50
100s/50s	5/10	0/0
Top score	170	33
Balls bowled	25	–
Wickets	0	–
Bowling average	–	–
5 wickets in innings	–	–
10 wickets in match	–	n/a
Best bowling	–	–
Catches/stumpings	39/–	3/–
- Source: ESPNcricinfo, 7 January 2016

Raja Venkatraman (born 7 September 1958), better known as Raja Venkat, is a former Indian first-class cricketer and national team selector. He played for Bengal cricket team between the 1980/81 and 1991/92 seasons. He was part of the Indian team selection panel from 2008 to 2012.

== Life and career ==
Venkatraman was born on 7 September 1958 in Bombay and brought up in Calcutta. His native is Palakkad in Kerala. He played as an attacking left-handed batsman for Bengal and East Zone, appearing in 41 first-class and 8 List A matches between 1980/81 and 1991/92. He was part of the Bengal team that won the 1989–90 Ranji Trophy as well as the one that finished runners-up in the previous season.

He worked as junior selector for Bengal twice. He was part of the Board of Control for Cricket in India media committee as well as museum committee. In 2008, he became a member of the Indian team selection panel, representing East Zone, for a term of four years. In 2015, he made revelations about the committee meetings during his tenure, causing a controversy.
