= Golam Faruq (cricketer) =

Bangladeshi cricketer (born 1962)

Personal information
- Born: 24 July 1962 (age 64); Dacca, East Pakistan (present-day Dhaka, Bangladesh)
- Batting: Right-handed
- Bowling: Right-arm medium

International information
- National side: Bangladesh
- ODI debut (cap 3): 31 March 1986 v Pakistan
- Last ODI: 28 April 1990 v New Zealand
- Source: , 13 February 2006

Golam Faruq is a former Bangladeshi cricketer who played in five One Day Internationals from 1986 to 1990. A right arm medium pacer and more than a useful lower-order batsman, Faruq (commonly known as Suru) was a regular with the national side throughout the 1980s.

== In ODIs ==
He was one of the players who played in Bangladesh's first ever ODI against Pakistan. He didn't get much success with the ball at the highest level. But, as a batsman his 23* helped Bangladesh reach 3 figures against Sri Lanka in 88.

== In ICC Trophy ==
He played in only four ICC Trophy matches, despite being part of three ICC Trophy teams. In 1982, he didn't play any of the games. As a novice, he was mainly included in the touring party to get valuable experience in English conditions. He played two games in 1986, 2 more in 1990. Overall, he performed admirably with the ball, taking five wickets for 114 runs at an average of 22.80 per wicket. His best, 2/27 helped Bangladesh win a vital 2nd round match against Canada in 1990.

== Other matches ==
As a bowler, his greatest moment came at Dhaka in January 1984. He took 6/10 (including a hat-trick) against Singapore in the opening match of the 1984 South-East Asia Cup. He was a consistent performer in domestic cricket throughout the 1980s. He is considered one of the best Bangladeshi players of the 1980s.
