= Rupert Gomes =

West Indian cricketer (born 1950)

Personal information
- Full name: Rupert Gomes
- Born: 10 April 1950 (age 76); Georgetown, Guyana
- Batting: Right-handed
- Bowling: Right-arm off break

International information
- National side: Netherlands

Domestic team information
- Years: Team
- 1971/72–1980/81: Guyana
- 1971/72–1975/76: Demerara

Career statistics
Competition	FC	LA	ICC T
Matches	16	10	18
Runs scored	617	215	772
Batting average	24.68	23.88	59.38
100s/50s	1/3	0/1	3/2
Top score	113	57	169*
Balls bowled	684	246	–
Wickets	7	5	–
Bowling average	50.42	37.40	–
5 wickets in innings	0	0	–
10 wickets in match	0	0	–
Best bowling	2/17	2/29	–
Catches/stumpings	8/–	0/–	6/–
- Source: CricketArchive, 17 January 2011

Rupert Gomes (born 10 April 1950) is a former international cricketer born at Georgetown, Guyana. He played first-class and List A cricket for Guyana until the 1980–81 season. He represented the Netherlands in the ICC Trophy tournaments of 1986 and 1990. In the latter tournament, Gomes scored 169 not out against Israel, the highest score by a Netherlands player in the ICC Trophy.
