= Sambaran Banerjee =

Indian cricketer, coach, columnist, analyst, and administrator

Sambaran Banerjee (born 1 November 1953) is a cricket coach, a columnist, TV analyst and was an administrator in the Cricket Association of Bengal. In addition to it he was also the chief selector of Bengal Cricket Team. He resigned from the title of chief selector after the selection of Devang Gandhi as the chief selector on 3 December 2015. He was a former cricketer and led Bengal to the Ranji Trophy win in 1990.

He was also a cricket selector for the Indian cricket team, selecting Sourav Ganguly as the captain of Indian Cricket Team.

== Filmography ==
- Chalo Paltai (2011)
