= Tuku Raka =

Papua New Guinean cricketer (1963–2020)

Personal information
- Born: 18 April 1963
- Died: 29 March 2020 (aged 56)
- Source: Cricinfo, 24 April 2021

Tuku Raka (18 April 1963 – 29 March 2020) was a Papua New Guinean cricketer. From 1986 to 2001, he played in 31 matches for the Papua New Guinea cricket team in five editions of the ICC Trophy. The Papua New Guinean cricket board described him as the "country's number one bowler".
