= Hafizur Rahman (cricketer) =

Bangladeshi cricketer (born 1959)

International information
- National side: Bangladesh
- ODI debut (cap 4): 31 March 1986 v Pakistan
- Last ODI: 2 April 1986 v Sri Lanka
- Source: ESPNcricinfo, 13 February 2006

Hafizur Rahman (born September 21, 1959) is a former Bangladeshi cricketer who played in two One Day Internationals in 1986. A wicket-keeper, Hafizur Rahman moved to the U.S. after retiring from international cricket.

In 1984, Hafiz played for the Bangladesh Tigers at the inaugural South East Asian Cricket Cup in Bangladesh. He scored 75 against Singapore. There, he put on 208 runs with Rafiqul Alam who scored 129.

Over the next two years, Hafiz toured Kenya, Pakistan and SL, and played against Sri Lanka (1985) and Omar Quareshi XI (Pakistan) (1986). In March, 1986, he took 6 catches in a limited over game against the Lahore Cricket Association. But later in 1986, he lost his place to Nasir Ahmed.
