= Steve Atkinson (cricketer) =

English cricketer

Personal information
- Full name: Stephen Robert Atkinson
- Born: 8 December 1952 (age 73); Birtley, County Durham, England
- Batting: Right-handed
- Role: Batsman
- Relatives: Jamie Atkinson (son)

International information
- National sides: Netherlands (1986); Hong Kong (1991–1994)

Domestic team information
- Years: Team
- 1973–1985: Durham
- 1974: Minor Counties North
- 1978: Minor Counties East
- 1985–1989: Minor Counties

Career statistics
Competition	FC	LA	ICC T
Matches	1	23	16
Runs scored	63	453	618
Batting average	63.00	19.69	47.53
100s/50s	0/1	0/2	2/3
Top score	63	84	162
Catches/stumpings	1/0	7/0	9/0
- Source: Cricket Archive, 21 October 2007

Stephen Robert Atkinson (born 8 December 1952) is an English-born former cricketer who represented both the Netherlands and Hong Kong in international cricket.

A right-handed batsman, he also played minor counties cricket for Durham and played for the second XIs of first-class counties Warwickshire, Nottinghamshire, Leicestershire and Northamptonshire.

== Career ==
Atkinson was born in Birtley, near Gateshead, County Durham, England. After making his debut for Durham in 1972, he made his List A debut against Yorkshire in the first round of the Gillette Cup in 1973, when Durham became the first minor county in the Gillette Cup to beat one of the 17 senior counties. He played in the Benson & Hedges Cup for a Minor Counties North team in 1974, in addition to two more matches for Durham in the Gillette Cup.

He next played List A cricket for Durham in the 1977 Gillette Cup against Northamptonshire, and played for Minor Counties North in the following year's Benson & Hedges Cup, also playing for Durham in the Gillette Cup the same year, and the subsequent three years.

He played his final List A match for Durham against Kent in 1985, and all his subsequent List A matches were for a combined Minor Counties team. Also in 1985, he played his only first-class match, for a combined Minor Counties team against Zimbabwe; he opened the batting and top-scored with 63 in the Minor Counties' only innings. The following year, he played for the Netherlands in the 1986 ICC Trophy and scored 162 against Israel, the second highest score for the Netherlands in the ICC Trophy competition and the fourth highest overall.

He continued to play for Durham for the next three years, though he eventually settled in Hong Kong, where his son James (who has played cricket for Hong Kong) was born in 1990. He played for Hong Kong at the 1994 ICC Trophy. He now is the selector for Hong Kong's junior teams.
