= Pranob Nandy =

Indian cricketer (born 1955)

Personal information
- Born: 23 May 1955 (age 71); Calcutta, India
- Source: Cricinfo, 31 March 2016

Pranob Nandy (born 23 May 1955) is an Indian former cricketer. He played 22 first-class matches for Bengal between 1979 and 1987.

== See also ==
- List of Bengal cricketers
