= Simon Myles =

English cricketer (born 1966)

Personal information
- Full name: Simon David Myles
- Born: 2 June 1966 (age 60); Mansfield, Nottinghamshire, England
- Batting: Right-handed
- Bowling: Right-arm medium

International information
- National side: Hong Kong

Domestic team information
- Years: Team
- 1995–2002: Berkshire
- 1994–1996: Minor Counties
- 1992–1994: Staffordshire
- 1990: Cumberland
- 1988: Warwickshire
- 1987: Sussex

Career statistics
Competition	FC	LA
Matches	7	27
Runs scored	189	543
Batting average	21.00	30.16
100s/50s	–/1	–/5
Top score	59*	81
Balls bowled	138	517
Wickets	–	14
Bowling average	–	31.85
5 wickets in innings	–	–
10 wickets in match	–	–
Best bowling	–	4/8
Catches/stumpings	4/–	6/–
- Source: Cricinfo, 30 September 2010

Simon David Myles (born 2 June 1966) is a former English-Hong Kong cricketer who played for Hong Kong. Myles was a right-handed batsman who bowled right-arm medium pace. He was born in Mansfield, Nottinghamshire.

== International career ==
His debut for Hong Kong came in 1984 against the Bangladesh Cricket Board Under-25s. He represented Hong Kong in the 1986 ICC Trophy, marking his debut match in that tournament against Gibraltar. During the tournament he played 8 matches, the last of which came against Papua New Guinea. During his 8 matches in the tournament, he scored 408 runs at a batting average of 58.28, with 2 half centuries and a single century score of 172. This score remains the highest individual score in the ICC Trophy. With the ball he took 6 wickets at a bowling average of 29.66, with best figures of 3/30.

In February 2020, he was named in England's squad for the Over-50s Cricket World Cup in South Africa. However, the tournament was cancelled during the third round of matches due to the coronavirus pandemic.

== County cricket ==
Myles' first-class debut came for Sussex against Derbyshire in the 1987 County Championship. During the 1987 season, he played a further first-class match for the county against Hampshire. His debut in List-A cricket also came during the 1987 season, making his debut in that format for Sussex against Glamorgan. He played 7 further List-A matches during the 1987 season, the last of which came when Sussex played Surrey. Simon went to school at KGV ESF school in Hong Kong playing alongside Dermot Reeve and other talented cricketers of different nationalities. His batting coach, schoolmaster David Clinton, played for Hong Kong at cricket as did Simon and Dermot before they left for UK to further their cricket talents. In the mini world cup game against Gibraltar Simon threw the cricket ball 100 meters to run out a batsman – tremendous throwing arm. He was a competent legspin bowler but converted to medium pace when playing for a Grade A side in Australia.

In 1988, he joined Warwickshire. He made his first-class debut for the county against the touring Sri Lankans, playing 3 further first-class matches for the county in 1988, with his final first-class appearance coming against Middlesex. He also represented the county in 2 List-A matches during the 1988 season, which came against Northamptonshire and Northamptonshire.

In 1990, Myles joined Cumberland, where he played a single Minor Counties Championship match against Norfolk.

In 1992, he joined Staffordshire, making his Minor Counties Championship debut for the county against Suffolk. From 1992 to 1994, he represented the county in 24 Championship matches, the last of which came against Lincolnshire. He also represented the county in the MCCA Knockout Trophy. His debut in that competition came against Wales Minor Counties. From 1992 to 1994, he represented the county in 10 Trophy matches, the last of which came against Wales Minor Counties. Additionally, he also played List-A cricket for Staffordshire. His first List-A match for the county came in the 1992 NatWest Trophy against Warwickshire. He played 2 further List-A matches for the county against Hampshire in the 1993 NatWest Trophy and Surrey in the 1994 NatWest Trophy.

Myles made his debut for the Minor Counties cricket team in 1994. He played his final first-class match representing the team against the touring South Africans. He also represented the team in 8 List-A matches between 1994 and 1996, the last of which came against Derbyshire in the 1996 Benson and Hedges Cup.

In 1995, he joined Berkshire; this was to be his final county. He made his debut in the 1995 Championship against Shropshire. From 1995 to 2000, he represented the county in 46 Championship matches, the last of which came against Oxfordshire in the 2000 Championship. He also represented the county in the MCCA Knockout Trophy, making his debut for Berkshire in that competition against Oxfordshire. From 1995 to 2000, he represented the county in 13 Trophy matches, the last of which came against Herefordshire. His List-A debut for the county came against Leicestershire in the 1996 NatWest Trophy. Between 1996 and 2002, he represented the county in 5 List-A matches, the last of which came against Norfolk in the 2nd round of the 2003 Cheltenham & Gloucester Trophy which was played in 2002.

In his combined career total of 27 List-A matches, he scored 543 runs at an average of 30.16, with 5 half centuries and a high score of 81. With the ball he took 14 wickets at a bowling average of 31.85, with best figures of 4/8. In the field he took a total of 6 catches.
