= Zahoor Sheikh =

Pakistani-born Kenyan cricketer (born 1953)

Zahoor Sheikh (born 13 June 1953) is a Kenyan former professional cricketer renowned for his contributions to both ICC Trophy and first-class cricket. Primarily acknowledged as a right-handed batsman and a right-arm medium-fast bowler, Sheikh played a pivotal role in representing the Kenyan national side during his cricketing career.

== Teams ==
– Kenya (Other FC: 1986/87) – Kenya (ICC Trophy: 1982–1986) – Kenya Cricket Association XI (Miscellaneous: 1977/78-1985/86) – Kenya Cricket Association Chairman's XI (Miscellaneous: 1984/85) – Nairobi Provincial Cricket Association XI (Miscellaneous: 1986/87)

== First-Class Career (1986/87) ==
Batting and Fielding:

M	I	NO	Runs	HS	Ave	100	50	Ct
1	2	1	15	12*	15.00	0	0	1

Bowling:

Balls	Mdns	Runs	Wkts	BB	Ave	5wI	10wM	SRate	Econ
144	4	95	2	2–71	47.50	0	0	72.00	3.95

== ICC Trophy Career (1982–1986) ==
Batting and Fielding:

M	I	NO	Runs	HS	Ave	100	50	Ct
12	10	2	80	38	10.00	0	0	2

Bowling:

Balls	Mdns	Runs	Wkts	BB	Ave	4wI	5wI	SRate	Econ
610	34	287	24	4–20	11.95	2	0	25.41	2.82

== Notable Achievement ==
During the 1982 ICC Trophy, Zahoor Sheikh delivered a remarkable performance at Hints Road, Tamworth, achieving his best bowling figures of 4–20, delivering at an average speed of around 145 km per hour.
