= Gazi Ashraf =

Bangladeshi International cricketer

Personal information
- Full name: Gazi Ashraf Hossain
- Born: 29 December 1960 (age 65); Dhaka Bikrampur now known as Munshiganj, East Pakistan, Now Bangladesh
- Nickname: Lipu
- Batting: Right-handed
- Bowling: Right-arm off break

International information
- National side: Bangladesh
- ODI debut (cap 1): 31 March 1986 v Pakistan
- Last ODI: 30 April 1990 v Australia

Career statistics
Competition	ODIs
Matches	7
Runs scored	59
Batting average	8.42
100s/50s	–/–
Top score	18
Balls bowled	51
Wickets	2
Bowling average	16.50
5 wickets in innings	–
10 wickets in match	–
Best bowling	1/7
Catches/stumpings	1/–
- Source: ESPNcricinfo, 13 February 2006

Gazi Ashraf Hossain (Bengali: গাজী আশরাফ হোসেন; born 29 December 1960, Bikrampur, Dhaka), also known as Lipu, is a former Bangladeshi cricketer who captained the Bangladesh national cricket team in its first seven One Day International (ODI) matches, two in the 1986 Asia Cup, three in the 1988 Asia Cup, and a further two in the 1990 Austral-Asia Cup.

== ODI records ==
Lipu's highest ODI score (18) came in his very final ODI against Australia at Sharjah in 1990. He also has two ODI wickets to his name, one of them being Javed Miandad, whom he dismissed at Moratuwa in the Asia Cup in 1986.

== ICC Trophy ==
He played in 20 ICC Trophy matches for Bangladesh in 1982, 1986, and 1990. He was a member of the team captained by Shafiq-ul-Haq that lost its Semi Final against Zimbabwe and then also lost the Consolation Final against Papua New Guinea in the 1982 ICC Trophy in England. His best performance came in the opening match against West Africa. His 77 helped Bangladesh beat their opponents by 76 runs. Unfortunately, he was unable to keep up his good form, and at the end of the trophy he finished with 126 runs from 7 innings, with an average of 21.00. He was the captain in the 1986 ICC Trophy also held in England, but the team failed to progress pass the group stage. Bangladesh defeated Kenya and Argentina, but lost against Zimbabwe (the eventual winners), Malaysia, East Africa and Denmark. Lipu's top score (41) came against Malaysia. He also took 6 wickets in the trophy at an average of 29.66. His best bowling was 3/26 against Kenya.

Ashraf Lipu was captain again in the ICC Trophy of 1990, in Netherlands. Though Lipu himself was out of form, (he scored only 106 runs in 7 innings, his highest, 40 coming in the first match against Kenya), the team performed admirably under his leadership to reach the semi-finals. Thus Lipu ended his international career on a high.

		Batting				Bowling			
Year	Matches	Runs	Average	High Score	100 / 50	Runs	Wickets	Average	Best
1982	7	126	21.00	77	0/1	30	2	15.00	2/30
1986	6	123	20.50	41	0/0	178	6	29.67	3/26
1990	7	106	15.14	40	0/0	-	-	-	-
Overall	20	355	18.68	77	0/1	208	8	26.00	3/26

== In other tournaments ==
Gazi Ashraf enjoyed outstanding success in the 1984 South-East Asia Cup. His highest 62 came against Bangladesh Tigers. He also scored 40 against Hong Kong in the Final. It was during this tournament, that he cemented his place as the regular No 3 in the national side. In the tour to Kenya that followed, he did well in the 3-day and 2 Day match, but missed out in the One-Day matches.

== As a captain ==
Among all the captains of Bangladesh, Lipu enjoyed the longest stint. He captained Bangladesh against Sri Lanka in March 1985, and remained as captain until the ICC Trophy in the summer of 1990.

Before taking up the captaincy of the national side, Lipu had already proved himself as a successful leader in domestic cricket. He was successful as captain of Abahani KC in the Dhaka League, and as the captain of Dhaka University in national cricket. Also, in January 1985, he led the Bangladesh U-25 side against a touring New Zealand team. According to many analysts, the era of Lipu's captaincy saw the most significant developments in Bangladesh cricket. While the national team failed to achieve expected results, the period saw a number of talented cricketers like Minhajul Abedin, Athar Ali Khan, Akram Khan, Gholam Nousher, Aminul Islam and few others emerge as quality international players. These players would be the stars of the Bangladesh side throughout the 90's and beyond. More importantly, during the second half of the 80's, professionalism entered Bangladesh cricket and at the same time cricket became increasingly popular among the young generation.

Even after retiring from international cricket Gazi Ashraf Lipu continued to be a successful captain in domestic arena. He led Abahani KC to the Dhaka league title in 1993–94. Faruk Ahmed, who was the captain of the national squad at that time was playing under him in League cricket.

Bangladeshi ODI captains
Number	Name	Year	Played	Won	Tied	Lost	No result
1	Gazi Ashraf	1985/6-1989/90	7	0	0	7	0

Bangladeshi ICC Trophy captains
Number	Name	Year	Played	Won	Tied	Lost	No result	Where finished
2	Gazi Ashraf	1986	6	2	0	4	0	Sixth in qualifying group
2	Gazi Ashraf	1990	7	5	0	2	0	Semi-Finalists
2	Gazi Ashraf	Total	13	7	0	6	0	

Gazi Ashraf captaincy record in major competitions
Year	Tournament	Venue	Result
1986	2nd Asia Cup	Sri Lanka	3rd among 3 Countries
1986	3rd ICC Trophy	England	Eliminated in the 1st round (6th in a group of 7 teams)
1988	2nd South East Asian Cup	Hong Kong	Champion
1988	3rd Asia Cup	Bangladesh	4th among 4 countries
1990	2nd Austral-Asia Cup	Sharjah (UAE)	Eliminated in the 1st round (3rd in a group of 3 teams)
1990	4th ICC Trophy	Netherlands	3rd Place (17 teams competed)

Preceded by Raquibul Hasan	Bangladeshi cricket Captains; 1985–1990	Succeeded by Minhajul Abedin

Preceded by Shafiq-ul-Haq	Bangladeshi ICC Trophy Captains; 1986, 1990	Succeeded by Faruk Ahmed

== As a cricket administrator ==
In recent years, Lipu has successfully served different top level administrative positions in Bangladesh cricket. He is still heavily involved with the development of cricket in Bangladesh.
