= Wahidul Gani =

Cricketer

Personal information
- Born: 22 September 1958 (age 68); Dacca, East Pakistan (present-day Dhaka, Bangladesh)
- Batting: Right-handed
- Bowling: Right-arm leg-spin

International information
- National side: Bangladesh
- Only ODI (cap 20): 28 October 1988 v Pakistan

Career statistics
Competition	ODI
Matches	1
Runs scored	–
Batting average	–
100s/50s	–
Top score	–
Balls bowled	36
Wickets	0
Bowling average	–
5 wickets in innings	–
10 wickets in match	–
Best bowling	–
Catches/stumpings	0/–
- Source: ESPNcricinfo, 21 December 2015

Wahidul Gani (born 22 September 1958) is a former Bangladeshi cricketer who played in one One Day International in 1988, and a coach who is highly regarded for his coaching of young cricketers.

== Playing career ==
Wahidul Gani was a right-arm leg-spin bowler and a lower order batsman. He played his only ODI match for Bangladesh against Pakistan in the Asia Cup at Chittagong MA Aziz Stadium in 1988.

== Coaching career ==
After retiring he dedicated his time to finding and coaching young talented Bangladeshi cricketers. He founded a coaching institution called "Ankur" and trained his students by himself, three times a week, at the indoor facilities of the Abahani Club. One of his students, Mohammad Ashraful, who was discovered by Wahid at the age of 11, scored a Test century in 2001 at the age of 16 to become the youngest centurion in Test history. Another of his students, Mohammad Sharif, also started his international career on a high but later lost his place for the national team because of long-term injury.
