= Sujan Mukherjee (cricketer) =

Indian cricketer (born 1955)

Personal information
- Born: 10 February 1955 (age 71); Calcutta, India
- Source: Cricinfo, 7 April 2016

Sujan Mukherjee (born 10 February 1955) is an Indian former cricketer. He played twelve first-class matches for Bengal between 1980 and 1986.

== See also ==
- List of Bengal cricketers
