= M. V. Narasimha Rao =

Indian cricketer (born 1954)

M. V. Narasimha Rao MBE
Personal information
- Full name: Madireddy Venkat Narasimha Rao
- Born: 11 August 1954 (age 72); Secunderabad, Hyderabad State, India
- Batting: Right-handed
- Bowling: Legbreak

International information
- National side: India
- Test debut (cap 142): 29 December 1978 v West Indies
- Last Test: 26 October 1979 v Australia

Career statistics
Competition	Test	First-class
Matches	4	108
Runs scored	46	4,845
Batting average	9.19	40.71
100s/50s	0/0	9/30
Top score	20*	160*
Balls bowled	463	13,265
Wickets	3	245
Bowling average	75.66	28.05
5 wickets in innings	0	15
10 wickets in match	0	3
Best bowling	2/46	7/21
Catches/stumpings	8/–	111/–
- Source: ESPNcricinfo, 20 November 2022

Madireddy Venkat "Bobjee" Narasimha Rao MBE (born 11 August 1954), is a former Indian cricketer who played in four Test matches from 1978 to 1979. He was also a cricket coach.

== Cricket career ==
He was picked to play for India against West Indies in 1978–79, but after two tests he was dropped. He was again brought back the following season for the series against Kim Hughes' Australian team, but again discarded after two Tests. In the 5th test against Australia at Eden Gardens, he played a crucial role in saving India from imminent defeat. India required 247 to win on the last day and at one point was struggling with 4 wickets down for 123. Four key batsmen - Gavaskar, Vengsarkar, Vishwanath and Chetan Chauhan were already back in the pavilion when Narasimha Rao provided a match-saving partnership with Yashpal Sharma who scored an unbeaten 85. India ended up with a score of 200 for 4 to draw the Test. This was the last Test match played by Narasimha Rao. As an alert close-in fielder, however he did well in picking up eight catches.

Rao captained Hyderabad in Ranji Trophy from 1977-78 to 1987-88. In the 1984-85 season, he scored his career best 160* against Kerala. A failure to win this match due to a delayed declaration was a factor in Hyderabad failing to qualify from the South Zone. Vivek Jaisimha replaced him as captain for 1985-86 but Hyderabad once again failed to qualify. Back as captain in 1986-87, Rao captained Hyderabad to the Ranji title for the second time in their history.

In first class cricket Rao scored 4,124 runs (avg 47.40) and took 218 wickets (avg 24.20).

== Coaching career ==
Rao returned to competitive international cricket albeit as an assistant coach of the Ireland Cricket team for the 2011 ICC World Cup. In December 2012, Rao became the first Indian cricketer to be appointed Member of the Order of the British Empire (MBE) for his contribution for promoting the sport and also for community service through cricket during the testing times faced by the ethnic community in Northern Ireland.

After Rao retired, he set up the St Johns Cricket Academy which produced many stars like VVS Laxman, Mithali Raj, Bavanaka Sandeep, Hanuma Vihari and Tarun Nethula.
