= Clement Neblett =

Guyanese cricketer

Personal information
- Full name: Clement Everton Neblett
- Born: 10 March 1950; Mahaica Village, British Guiana
- Died: March 2012 (aged 61); Saint Vincent
- Batting: Left-handed
- Bowling: Left-arm medium

International information
- National side: Canada (1981–1986)

Domestic team information
- Years: Team
- 1973–1975: Demerara
- 1978: Guyana
- Source: ESPNcricinfo, 8 March 2016

Clement Everton Neblett (March 10, 1950 – March 2012) was a Guyanese cricketer, popularly known as “Nebbo". A former Police Sports Club member and an international league cricketer, Neblett represented the Canadian National Team in the 1980s. He spent his childhood and early adolescence in Mahaica Village, in what is now Guyana's Demerara-Mahaica region before emigrating to Canada, where he played in West Indian domestic cricket. He made his first-class debut in October 1973, playing for Demerara against Berbice in the final of the inter-county Jones Cup. Neblett did not make his national debut until January 1978, when he represented the Guyanese national team against Trinidad and Tobago and the Leeward Islands in the regional one-day competition. Later in the year, he also played three Shell Shield games for Guyana, which were his final appearances at regional level.

Generally batting in the middle order, Neblett scored two first-class half-centuries during his career, with a highest of 63 not out, finishing with a career batting average of 34.57. All-rounder. Debut vs Jamaica at Jarret Park, Montego Bay 1978. He also took 15 wickets, with a best of 4/70 (taken for Guyana against the Combined Islands). After emigrating to Canada, Neblett made his Ontario debut in 1980 (against Quebec) and his national team debut in 1981 (on a tour of Ireland). At the 1982 ICC Trophy in England, he played in three of his team's four completed matches, scoring 82 runs and taking six wickets (including 4/26 against Kenya). Four years later, at the 1986 ICC Trophy, Neblett was appointed Canada's captain, appearing in every game. He scored 139 runs, including 63 against Israel, and took four wickets, including 3/14 against the United States. In the mid-1990s, Clement Neblett emigrated for a second time, settling in the United States.

In March 2012, Clement Everton Neblett died of a sudden heart attack during his business trip to Saint Vincent and the Grenadines.
