= Noel Gibbons =

Bermudian cricketer (born 1956)

Personal information
- Full name: Noel Alfred Gibbons
- Born: 1 December 1956 (age 69); Bermuda
- Batting: Right-handed
- Bowling: Right-arm medium

International information
- National side: Bermuda

Domestic team information
- Years: Team
- 1971/72: Bermuda

Career statistics
Competition	First-class
Matches	1
Runs scored	5
Batting average	2.50
100s/50s	–/–
Top score	4
Balls bowled	–
Wickets	–
Bowling average	–
5 wickets in innings	–
10 wickets in match	–
Best bowling	–
Catches/stumpings	1/–
- Source: CricketArchive, 13 October 2011

Noel Gibbons (born 1 December 1956 in Bermuda) is a former Bermudian cricketer. He was a right-handed batsman and right-arm medium pace bowler. He played one first-class match for Bermuda, against New Zealand in 1972, scoring five runs. It was the maiden first-class match to be played by the Bermuda cricket team.

His greatest success came in the ICC Trophy, where he had a fine all-round career. In 34 matches he scored 631 runs at an average of 30.04. His top score of 125 not out against Hong Kong in 1986 is the third highest for Bermuda in the ICC Trophy. He also took 42 wickets at an average of 22.85. Only four players have taken more wickets in the history of the tournament.
