= 1986 ICC Trophy =

International cricket tournament held in England

- Dates: 11 June – 7 July 1986
- Administrator: International Cricket Council
- Cricket format: Limited overs cricket
- Tournament format(s): Round-robin and Knockout
- Host: England
- Champions: Zimbabwe (2nd title)
- Runners-up: Netherlands
- Participants: 16
- Most runs: (Canada) Paul Prashad (533)
- Most wickets: (Netherlands) Ronnie Elferink (23)

The 1986 ICC Trophy was a limited-overs cricket tournament held in England between 11 June and 7 July 1986. It was the third ICC Trophy tournament to be staged, and as with the previous two tournaments, games between the 16 participating teams were played over 60 overs a team and with white clothing and red balls. All matches except the final were played in the Midlands. The final was held at Lord's, London.

The tournament served as the Cricket World Cup qualification process – Zimbabwe defeated the Netherlands to win their second ICC Trophy in a row and qualify for the 1987 World Cup. The weather was much better than the earlier competitions, and all matches were played to a result.

== Competition format ==
The 16 teams were divided into two groups, one containing seven teams and the other containing nine. Each teams played each other team in its group once in matches played between 16 June and 5 July, scoring four points for a win and two for a no-result (match started but not finished) or abandoned entirely without a ball being bowled. The top two teams in each group went forward to the semi-finals, the top team in each group playing team with the runner-up from the other. Where teams finished with equal points totals, run rate was used to separate them.

== Teams and squads ==
- Group A: Argentina, Bangladesh, Denmark, East Africa, Kenya, Malaysia, Zimbabwe
- Group B: Bermuda, Canada, Fiji, Gibraltar, Hong Kong, Israel, Netherlands, Papua New Guinea, USA

== Group matches ==
=== Group A ===
==== 11 June ====
In a match reduced to 50 overs a team, Denmark (221/7) easily defeated Argentina (100). Soren Henriksen made 56 for the Danes, while Ole Mortensen took 4–15. A fine knock of 135 by Andy Pycroft helped Zimbabwe to pile up 315/7 against Bangladesh who could manage only 171/8 in reply (Malcolm Jarvis 4-28). Meanwhile, 56 from P Banerji and 4-27 from DP John got Malaysia (142/8) through to a tight two-wicket victory over East Africa (140), despite DM Patel claiming 4–19.

==== 13 June ====
58 from P Budin helped Malaysia to 226/9, but the real culprits were the Argentine bowlers, who sent down a staggering 26 wides in the innings; AH Gooding took 4-35 from six overs. In reply Argentina fell to 44/7 and DA Culley's 41 could do no more than delay the inevitable as they were bowled out for 88 to lose by 134 runs. The other match played on this date was much closer, Bangladesh successfully defending a small total of 143 (Minhajul Abedin 50) by bowling out Kenya for 134.

==== 16 June ====
Denmark recovered from 20/2 to post a total of 274/7, with S Mikkelsen making 60, Ole Mortensen 59 and Soren Henriksen 50. In reply, East Africa could manage only 161, to lose by the large margin of 113 runs. Some excellent Zimbabwean bowling (Peter Rawson 9-3-16-3, John Traicos 10-2-19-3) saw them dismiss Kenya for 82, cruising to a seven-wicket triumph with more than half their overs remaining.

==== 18 June ====
Argentina surprisingly reduced Zimbabwe to 98/5, but then a stand of 174 between Rawson (125) and Gary Wallace (77) saw the Africans through to a daunting 357/7. Argentina were never likely to threaten such a target, and so it proved as they were bowled out for 150 to lose by a massive 207 runs. In the other Group A game, Jahangir Shah took 4-37 for Bangladesh but could not stop Malaysia making 239 (Asgari Stevens 68, Yazid Imran 64); DP John took 5–40 as the Bangladeshis slid to a 57-run defeat despite Rafiqul Alam's 51.

==== 20 June ====
Bangladesh made 162 against East Africa, with SM Lakha taking 4-31. In reply their opponents reached their target with only four wickets down, thanks largely to a stand of 125 for the third wicket between BR Bouri (66 not out) and FG Patel (53). 4-21 from England's future nemesis Eddo Brandes restricted Denmark to 146, a total which the Zimbabweans cruised past inside 35 overs, Grant Paterson making 86 not out. And 66 from Stevens helped Malaysia to 154, but it was insufficient as Kenya, 99/5 at one stage, recovered to win by five wickets.

==== 23 June ====
Despite no player reaching fifty, East Africa's 261/8 was always likely to be too good for Argentina, and so it proved as the South Americans were dismissed 84 runs short for 177, A Kumar claiming 6-26. The other match on this day, playing in Leicestershire at Egerton Park, saw Malaysia bowled out for 89 by Zimbabwe (Brandes 4–13, Rawson 4-22) who reached their target with little drama for the loss of just two wickets.

==== 25 June ====
Extras top-scored with 29 in Argentina's poor total of 122 against Bangladesh; the Asians had no problem knocking off the runs, Raqibul Hasan hitting 47 not out as they glided to an eight-wicket victory with more than 20 overs in hand. An exciting second match saw Denmark overcome Kenya by one wicket: some tight bowling from Mortensen (3-23) had restricted the Kenyans to 121, and although Denmark fell to 96/9, an unbroken last-wicket stand of 26 saw them through. For East Africa, GR Shariff made 72 and BR Bouri 31, but no one else passed 7 as Brandes (5-37) wreaked havoc to dismiss them for 140. In reply, Zimbabwe reached 143/0 with 33 overs to spare, with David Houghton scoring 87 not out and Paterson 55 not out.

==== 27 June ====
Solid contributions throughout the order (six men passed 20; Mortensen an unbeaten 55) guided Denmark to a good-looking 265/8 against Malaysia, despite Stevens' haul of 4-48, and it was too much for their opponents, who lost their first three wickets for 18 and were eventually dismissed off the penultimate ball for 178, 87 runs behind, despite V Vijiyalingam's 51, his only Trophy half-century. Anil Patel made 65 out of Kenya's 209/9 against local rivals East Africa, who had no chance once they had slumped to 33/5 and lost in the end by 63 runs.

==== 30 June ====
Kenya's captain Tom Tikolo top-scored with 48 as the Africans reached 228 all out against Argentina, who were unable to cope with the bowling of Zahoor Sheikh (4-25) and could do no better than 141, thus losing by 87 runs. Nehal Hasnain's 56 stood out for Bangladesh as Mortensen's 4-31 prevented their getting beyond 147; 49 for Johnny Jensen ensured a four-wicket victory for the Danes.

=== Group B ===
==== 11 June ====
A completely one-sided match saw Bermuda amass 304/9 (Arnold Manders 75) and then bowl out Fiji for just 69, with two men bowling unchanged throughout: A Edwards took 6-38 while T Burgess claimed 4-29. The USA's total of 152 looked vulnerable as Derek Abraham picked up 4-27, but Canada collapsed in reply and were dismissed for 79, Kamran Rasheed taking 4-22. An ICC Trophy record 172 from Simon Myles, who put on 174 for the third wicket with Nigel Stearns (62) guided Hong Kong to 324/5, and 63 from Gibraltar's Gary De'Ath made no difference to the result as they finished on 180/5, 144 runs adrift. The Netherlands won another one-sided game as they made 271/6 (RE Lifmann 98, RJ Elferink 64) and then ran through Papua New Guinea's batting, Paul-Jan Bakker taking 5–18 as PNG were bowled out for a mere 52.

==== 13 June ====
Bermuda became the first team to pass 400 in the ICC Trophy as they flayed Hong Kong's bowlers to the tune of 407/8, with Noel Gibbons making 125 not out and Ricky Hill 84, though Bob Fotheringham did take 4-51. Martin Sabine top-scored for Hong Kong with 55, but they fell 227 runs short of their target on 180/6. Canada made a reasonable 225/6 against the Netherlands (D Singh 50), but the Dutch recorded a six-wicket win with three overs to spare thanks to Rupert Gomes (82) and Steven Lubbers (51). D Moss made 108 for Israel against Fiji, but the next highest score was Extras with 19 and they totalled a disappointing 155 (Apenisa Waqaninamata 4-24) and 68 not out from VSJ Campbell set Fiji on their way to a nine-wicket victory. Kamran Rasheed made 73 and NS Lashkari 50 as the USA (283/7) beat Papua New Guinea (234; Karo Ao 62) by 49 runs.

==== 16 June ====
Outstanding figures of 10-6-10-4 from Bermuda's T Burgess kept Israel's total down to a measly 86, and Winston Reid plundered 63 not out as the Bermudians raced to their target in under 14 overs for the loss of just one wicket. Paul Prashad hit an unbeaten 164 for Canada as they made their way to 356/6, ably supported by D Singh (65). Papua New Guinea showed fight in their response, Karo Ao (67) and Taunao Vai (51) compiling an opening stand of 126, but then F Waithe (4-37) reduced them to 133/4 and there was no way back; Derick Etwaroo took 4-64 and PNG ended on 267/9. Future Woking F.C. FA Cup hero Tim Buzaglo made 88 for Gibraltar as they reached 185/8, but 55 from E Vakausausa made sure of victory for Fiji (187/4). And Bakker took 5–20 as the USA slid to 88 all out and a ten-wicket loss to the Netherlands.

==== 18 June ====
Bermuda made 224/9 (Hill 58, Manders 56), but despite no-one reaching 50 most of the USA team chipped in with useful runs and they won by three wickets with 16 balls to spare. 87 from Stearns and 80 from Myles helped Hong Kong to a good 261/7 against Canada, but a century opening partnership between Omadat Dipchand (76) and Prashad (40), plus 51 from IF Kirmani, got them to their target with four wickets and three balls remaining. Papua New Guinea obliterated Gibraltar by the little matter of 369 runs, amassing a Trophy record 455/9 (B Harry 127, Charles Amini 97, Api Leka 69, Renagi Ila 60 not out). De'Ath took five wickets, but his 12 overs cost 88 runs. In reply Gibraltar had no chance, subsiding to 86 all out with Maha taking 5-12 and G Ravu 4–16. Another lop-sided game saw the Netherlands put on 251 for the first wicket against Israel, Steve Atkinson making 162 and Lifmann 110. Gomes added 64 not out and Lubbers 50 as the Dutch closed on 425/4. D Moss made 62 and Stanley Perlman 51 for Israel as they reached 111/1, but that was as good as it got: Elferink ran through the order with 6-22 and they lost by 267 runs.

==== 20 June ====
Gibraltar were humiliated by Canada: Abraham took 5–9 as the Gibraltarians were dismissed for 46, the lowest total of the tournament, and it could have been worse as they were 17/7 at one point. In reply the Canadians smashed 48 from just 23 balls to record the easiest of ten-wicket wins. CAC Browne made 57 as Fiji posted a competitive total of 251 against the United States, but an unbeaten 104 by Lashkari and 74 from Kamran Rasheed ensured a five-wicket win for the Americans. The Dutch put on 200 for the second wicket against Hong Kong (Atkinson 107, Gomes 101) and their opponents could only manage 157/9 from their allotted overs. Finally, Harry made 162 and Maha 52 as Papua New Guinea (377/6) destroyed Israel (100); Amini took 5-19 for the Papuans.

==== 23 June ====
Gibraltar's 143/7 included 33 extras, but Bermuda still recorded a comfortable seven-wicket win. Canada made their way to 328/7 against Israel, with 120 from Prashad the highlight and support from captain Clement Neblett (63) and IF Kirmani (57). Their opponents could manage only 94 in reply (D Singh 4-34). Papua New Guinea beat Fiji by 195 runs, PNG's 381/8 boosted by 113 from W Maha; N Tiana claimed 4–50 in Fiji's innings as they were bowled out for 186. And despite Chris Collins' 53 pulling Hong Kong up from 58/6 to 143 all out, the USA secured a five-wicket win inside 25 overs.

==== 25 June ====
4-18 from Gibbons kept Canada's total down to an unimpressive 119 against Bermuda; the islanders reached their target for the loss of only two wickets, with S Lightbourne making an unbeaten 70. An outstanding analysis of 10.3-3-14-6 by the Netherlands' RJ Elferink helped them to dismiss Fiji for 103, and then Steve Atkinson contributed 52 not out towards a nine-wicket win for the Dutch. MU Prabhudas' 5-23 for the United States against Gibraltar restricted the latter to 136; the Americans won by eight wickets with captain and former West Indies Test batsman Sew Shivnarine making 70 not out.

==== 27 June ====
Papua New Guinea subsided to 48/6 before 73 from number eight batsman Raki Ila restored some respectability; nevertheless their final total of 184 was not enough, 65 from opener Ricky Hill setting Bermuda on their way to a six-wicket triumph. 6-11 from slow left-armer Bharat Gohel resulted in Fiji's dismissal for a paltry 87 against Hong Kong, who won by seven wickets. Gibraltar were all out for 134 against the Dutch, who then launched an astonishing assault against the Gibraltarian bowling, reaching 137/2 from just 11 overs. Against Israel, the United States ran up 396/4 (Kamran Rasheed 143 not out, H Blackman 83, Shivnarine 66, K Lorick 50 not out) before Prabhudas took 4–34 as Israel slipped to 149 all out.

==== 30 June ====
Gibbons made 51 out of Bermuda's 217 against the Netherlands, who lost their last four wickets for 12 runs to lose by 30 runs (Lightbourne 4-44). Canada's openers Dipchand (105) and Prashad (129) shared an opening partnership of 233 as their country made 356/2; Fiji made 109 to lose by a mammoth 247 runs. Israel made a highly respectable 262 against Gibraltar, with Z Moshe making 77, Perlman 69 and S Nemblette 63, but P White's 5-48 for the Gibraltarians proved important; they won by three wickets with eight balls to spare thanks to five scores of between 35 and 49. Hong Kong's 257/8 (Brian Catton 63, Ray Brewster) against Papua New Guinea looked good, but 55 from Vai and 50 from Maha was enough to get PNG home by two wickets with two overs in hand.

== Final group tables ==
Teams highlighted in yellow qualified for the semi-finals.

Group A
Pos	Team	P	W	L	RR	Pts
1	Zimbabwe	6	6	0	4.916	24
2	Denmark	6	5	1	3.681	20
3	Malaysia	6	3	3	2.901	12
4	Kenya	6	3	3	2.720	12
5	East Africa	6	2	4	2.835	8
6	Bangladesh	6	2	4	2.742	8
7	Argentina	6	0	6	2.223	0

Group B
Pos	Team	P	W	L	RR	Pts
1	Netherlands	8	7	1	5.018	28
2	Bermuda	8	7	1	4.620	28
3	United States	8	7	1	4.216	28
4	Canada	8	5	3	4.198	20
5	Papua New Guinea	8	4	4	4.621	16
6	Hong Kong	8	3	5	3.530	12
7	Fiji	8	2	6	2.641	8
8	Gibraltar	8	1	7	2.451	4
9	Israel	8	0	8	2.421	0

== Semi-finals - 2 July ==
=== Bermuda v Zimbabwe ===
Bermuda batted first and fell to 41/3, but recovered somewhat to put up a reasonable total of 201/7 from their 60 overs. Gibbons held the innings together with 58, while number seven OW Jones added a useful unbeaten 35; Rawson (3-28) had the best bowling figures. In reply, however, Zimbabwe sailed to an ominously impressive ten-wicket triumph inside 39 overs, with Paterson cashing in for 123 not out while his batting partner Robin Brown reached 61 not out.

=== Denmark v Netherlands ===
Denmark were in difficulties at 62/4 early on against the Dutch, with Elferink claiming 3-28, but then a stand of 99 between J Morild (who was eventually run out for 86) and Henriksen (42) righted the ship and guided the Danes to 224/8. The Netherlands also had their own problems and were 96/4 at one stage, but their scorecard was dominated by Gomes. He made 127 not out, 56.4% of his team's total, as they overhauled their target with five wickets and 5.4 overs still remaining.

== Third-place play-off - 4 July - Bermuda v Denmark ==
Denmark won this consolation game easily. Batting first the Bermudians put on an opening stand of 51, but struggled badly thereafter against Henriksen (4-26) and Mortensen (3-29), losing five wickets for 24 runs. A partnership of 60 between captain Arnold Manders (45) and his namesake Andre (26) restored some respectability, but a further collapse followed with the last five wickets going down for 20 to leave Bermuda 155 all out. Their bowlers had some early success as they reduced Denmark to 17/2 and 50/3, but A From-Hansen's timely innings of 78 made sure of a six-wicket victory.

== Final - 7 July - Netherlands v Zimbabwe ==
The Netherlands won the toss and put Zimbabwe in to bat. The African team made 243/9 from their allotted overs, with Brown hitting 60 and future Test player Andy Waller 59. Lubbers' 3-44 from 11 overs kept the total down to a gettable one, and the Netherlands had reached 11 without loss in reply when the rains came. On the reserve day, the Dutch went well at first to reach 109/1 before disaster struck with five wickets falling for 30 runs. Lubbers and Elferink tried to repair the damage with a defiant stand of 67, but it was too late as Iain Butchart (4-33) mopped up the tail. The Netherlands were all out for 218, with eight balls still left in the innings. Zimbabwe won the final by 25 runs.

== Statistics ==
=== Most runs ===
The top five run scorers (total runs) are included in this table.

Player	Team	Runs	Inns	Avg	Highest	100s	50s
Paul Prashad	Canada	533	8	88.83	164*	3	0
Steve Atkinson	Netherlands	508	10	72.57	162	2	2
Rupert Gomes	Netherlands	499	9	83.16	127*	2	2
Simon Myles	Hong Kong	408	8	58.28	172	1	2
Robert Lifmann	Netherlands	395	10	43.88	110	1	1

Source: CricketArchive

=== Most wickets ===
The top five wicket takers are listed in this table, listed by wickets taken and then by bowling average.

Player	Team	Overs	Wkts	Ave	SR	Econ	Best
Ronnie Elferink	Netherlands	86.1	23	9.82	22.47	2.62	6/14
Ole Mortensen	Denmark	78.5	22	9.40	21.50	2.62	4/15
Paul-Jan Bakker	Netherlands	90.0	21	13.19	25.71	3.07	5/18
Pacer Edwards	Bermuda	93.2	19	15.47	29.47	3.15	6/38
Peter Rawson	Zimbabwe	88.2	18	11.55	29.44	2.35	4/21

Source: CricketArchive
