= Derick Etwaroo =

Canadian cricketer (born 1964)

Personal information
- Born: 6 January 1964 (age 62); Guyana
- Batting: Right-handed
- Bowling: Right-arm off break

International information
- National side: Canada

Career statistics
Competition	List A
Matches	9
Runs scored	40
Batting average	8.00
100s/50s	0/0
Top score	19
Balls bowled	420
Wickets	4
Bowling average	66.25
5 wickets in innings	0
10 wickets in match	0
Best bowling	1/23
Catches/stumpings	1/–
- Source: CricketArchive, 14 October 2011

Derick Etwaroo (born 6 January 1964) was a member of the Canadian cricket team from 1986 until 1998. He played for Canada in four ICC Trophy tournaments and in nine list A games, including the cricket tournament at the 1998 Commonwealth Games.
