= Tim Buzaglo =

British footballer and cricketer

Personal information
- Date of birth: 20 June 1961 (age 65)
- Place of birth: Surbiton, England
- Position: Striker

Senior career*
Years	Team	Apps	(Gls)
1979–1986	Weysiders		
1986–1994	Woking		
- Marlow
- Wealdstone
- * Club domestic league appearances and goals

Tim Buzaglo (born 20 June 1961) is an English former footballer and cricketer.

== Football career ==
Buzaglo began his career at Guildford & District League club Weysiders in 1979, later joining Woking. His moment of glory came in the FA Cup Third Round in 1991 at West Bromwich Albion. Trailing 1–0 at half time, Buzaglo scored a hat-trick in the second half to help Woking to a 4–2 win. In the Fourth Round tie, Woking narrowly lost 1–0 to Everton.

Soon afterwards, Buzaglo suffered a serious injury and left Woking after a failed comeback attempt, later signing for Marlow. Following his time at Marlow, Buzaglo had a spell at Wealdstone, before retiring in 1997 due to injuries.

Buzaglo was placed in the FA's Team of Heroes to commemorate 125 years of the FA Cup in 2006.

== Cricket career ==
Between 1982 and 2001, Buzaglo also played ICC Trophy cricket for Gibraltar, playing 32 times for the team.

== Personal life ==
Buzaglo worked as an estate agent for Mann and Co. He is the father of Sky Sports TV presenter Olivia Buzaglo.
