= Shaheedur Rahman =

Bangladeshi cricketer (born 1963)

Personal information
- Full name: Shaheedur Rahman Shahid
- Born: 1 January 1963 (age 63); Chittagong, East Pakistan
- Batting: Right-handed
- Bowling: Right-arm off-break
- Role: Batsman

International information
- National side: Bangladesh (1985-1986)
- ODI debut (cap 11): 31 March 1986 v Pakistan
- Last ODI: 2 April 1986 v Sri Lanka

Domestic team information
- Years: Team
- Abahani Limited cricket team

Career statistics
Competition	ODI
Matches	2
Runs scored	62
Batting average	31.00
100s/50s	0/0
Top score	37
Catches/stumpings	0/–
- Source: CricInfo, 1 July 2019

Shaheedur Rahman (Bengali: শহীদুর রাহ্ মান, born 1 January 1963) is a former Bangladeshi cricketer who played in two One Day Internationals (ODIs) in 1986. He played before the establishment of the first-class game in Bangladesh, and before his nation attained Test status, but did represent his country in England in the 1986 ICC Trophy Tournament for non-Test playing nations.

He made his full One Day International debut on 31 March 1986 in the Asia Cup against Pakistan at the Tyronne Fernando Stadium, Moratuwa and played his second match against Sri Lanka at the Asgiriya Stadium, Kandy in the same competition. A right-handed top order batsman, he came in at number four and top scored with 37 from 60 balls on debut.
