= Kaushik Amalean =

Sri Lankan cricketer (born 1965)

Personal information
- Full name: Kaushik Nagindas Amalean
- Born: 7 April 1965 (age 61); Colombo, Sri Lanka
- Batting: Right-handed
- Bowling: Right-arm fast-medium

International information
- National side: Sri Lanka (1986–1988)
- Test debut (cap 37): 22 March 1986 v Pakistan
- Last Test: 12 February 1988 v Australia
- ODI debut (cap 48): 8 March 1986 v Pakistan
- Last ODI: 29 March 1988 v New Zealand

Career statistics
Competition	Test	ODI
Matches	2	8
Runs scored	9	15
Batting average	9.00	7.50
100s/50s	0/0	0/0
Top score	7*	9
Balls bowled	244	318
Wickets	7	9
Bowling average	22.28	23.00
5 wickets in innings	0	0
10 wickets in match	0	0
Best bowling	4/97	4/46
Catches/stumpings	1/–	0/–
- Source: Cricinfo, 9 February 2017

Kaushik Naginda Amalean (born 7 April 1965) is a former Sri Lankan cricketer who played in two Test matches and eight One Day Internationals from 1986 to 1988. He was born at Colombo in 1965.
