= Paul Prashad =

Canadian cricketer (born 1967)

Personal information
- Full name: Paul Prashad
- Born: 23 September 1967 (age 59); Albion, East Berbice-Corentyne, Guyana
- Batting: Right-handed
- Relatives: Martin Prashad (brother)

International information
- National side: Canada

Career statistics
Competition	List A
Matches	17
Runs scored	255
Batting average	19.61
100s/50s	0/2
Top score	61
Balls bowled	48
Wickets	1
Bowling average	60.00
5 wickets in innings	0
10 wickets in match	0
Best bowling	1/46
Catches/stumpings	1/–
- Source: CricketArchive, 14 October 2011

Paul Prashad (born 23 September 1967) is a Canadian former cricketer, who played his last international game on 17 October 2000. He was a right-handed batsman. His first known game for Canada was on 11 June 1986 against the USA in the 1986 ICC Trophy in England. He was one of Canada's most successful batsmen in ICC Trophy, scoring more runs in the tournament than any other Canadian batsman. He also scored three of Canada's centuries in the tournament, including the highest two scores, the highest being an unbeaten 164 against Papua New Guinea.
