= Rafiqul Alam (cricketer) =

Bangladeshi cricketer (born 1957)

Personal information
- Born: 4 October 1957 (age 69); Dacca, East Pakistan (present-day Dhaka, Bangladesh)

International information
- National side: Bangladesh
- ODI debut (cap 8): 31 March 1986 v Pakistan
- Last ODI: 2 April 1986 v Sri Lanka
- Source: ESPNcricinfo, 13 February 2006

Rafiqul Alam (Bengali: রফিকুল আলম) (born 4 October 1957) is a Bangladeshi former cricketer who played in two One Day Internationals in the 1986 Asia Cup. In his debut match against Pakistan he scored 14. He followed this with 10 against Sri Lanka.

== In ICC Trophy ==
He was a member of the Bangladesh team that took part in the 2nd ICC Trophy tournament in England. He played in all 7 matches (including the semi-Final against eventual champions Zimbabwe). Alam, however, failed to impress and scored only 79 runs. His highest was 33 in the very first match against West Africa.

He was slightly more successful four years later. He scored 135 runs with an average of 27.00. His top score was 51 against Malaysia. He also took 5 wickets in the tournament.

Rafiqul Alam ICC Trophy Record
		Batting				Bowling			
Year	Matches	Runs	Average	Highest Score	100 / 50	Runs	Wickets	Average	Best
1982	7	79	11.28	33	0/0	33	0	-	-
1986	6	135	27.00	51	0/1	126	5	25.20	3/48
Overall	13	214	17.83	51	0/1	169	5	33.80	3/48

== Innings against Omar Qureshi XI ==
Rafiqul Alam is best remembered for his sterling 86 against Omar Qureshi XI, a team of Pakistani players led by Imran Khan in January 1986.

== In domestic cricket ==
From the late 1970s until the early 1990s, Rafiqul Alam was one of the most consistent performers in domestic cricket arena. Unfortunately, he failed to achieve the same consistency in international arena. Nevertheless, many analysts still consider him one of the best Bangladeshi cricketer of the 1980s.

== After retirement ==
After serving as junior national selector in the 1990s, Rafiqul Alam concentrated on coaching club sides. He was the successful head coach of Kalabagan Krira Chakra in the late 1990s and 2000, 2001 and 2002. In 2007, he became chief national team selector. He has also been the coaching director of Dhanmondi Cricket Academy since its inception.
