= Peter Rawson =

Zimbabwean cricketer (born 1957)

Personal information
- Full name: Peter Walter Edward Rawson
- Born: 25 May 1957 (age 69); Salisbury, Southern Rhodesia
- Batting: Right-handed
- Bowling: Right-arm medium-fast

International information
- National side: Zimbabwe
- ODI debut (cap 10): 9 June 1983 v Australia
- Last ODI: 30 October 1987 v Australia

Career statistics
Competition	ODI	FC	LA
Matches	10	72	152
Runs scored	80	1,976	1,524
Batting average	16.00	20.80	22.08
100s/50s	0/0	0/8	0/2
Top score	24*	95	57*
Balls bowled	571	14,005	8,085
Wickets	12	257	179
Bowling average	35.58	23.90	24.61
5 wickets in innings	0	13	1
10 wickets in match	0	3	0
Best bowling	3/47	7/30	5/23
Catches/stumpings	4/–	40/–	50/–
- Source: ESPNcricinfo, 15 September 2013

Peter Walter Edward Rawson (born 25 May 1957) is a Zimbabwean former cricketer. He played ten One Day Internationals for Zimbabwe between 1983 and 1987.

An opening bowler and useful lower-order batsman, Rawson represented Zimbabwe at the 1983 and 1987 Cricket World Cups. In 1983 he took early wickets in the matches against India and West Indies that in each case briefly put Zimbabwe in a strong position.

In 1984 he played for Rishton in the Lancashire League, taking 102 wickets at 14.08 and scoring 539 runs at 22.46. He also played Minor Counties cricket for Suffolk.

He left Zimbabwe in 1989 and played the rest of his career with Natal in South Africa, retiring after the 1994–95 season.

His highest first-class score was 95 for Natal against Transvaal in 1989–90. His best innings bowling figures were 7 for 30 for Zimbabwe against the touring Lancashire team in 1988–89, and his best match figures were 13 for 143 (7 for 55 and 6 for 88) for Zimbabwe against Young Australia in 1982–83. In 1983–84, he helped Zimbabwe to a two-wicket victory over Young India by bowling unchanged throughout the match and taking 4 for 70 and 7 for 49.

He is now the Sales and Marketing Director at Trellidor, a home security company in Durban.
