= Minhajul Abedin =

Bangladeshi International cricketer (born 1965)

Minhajul Abedin Nannu
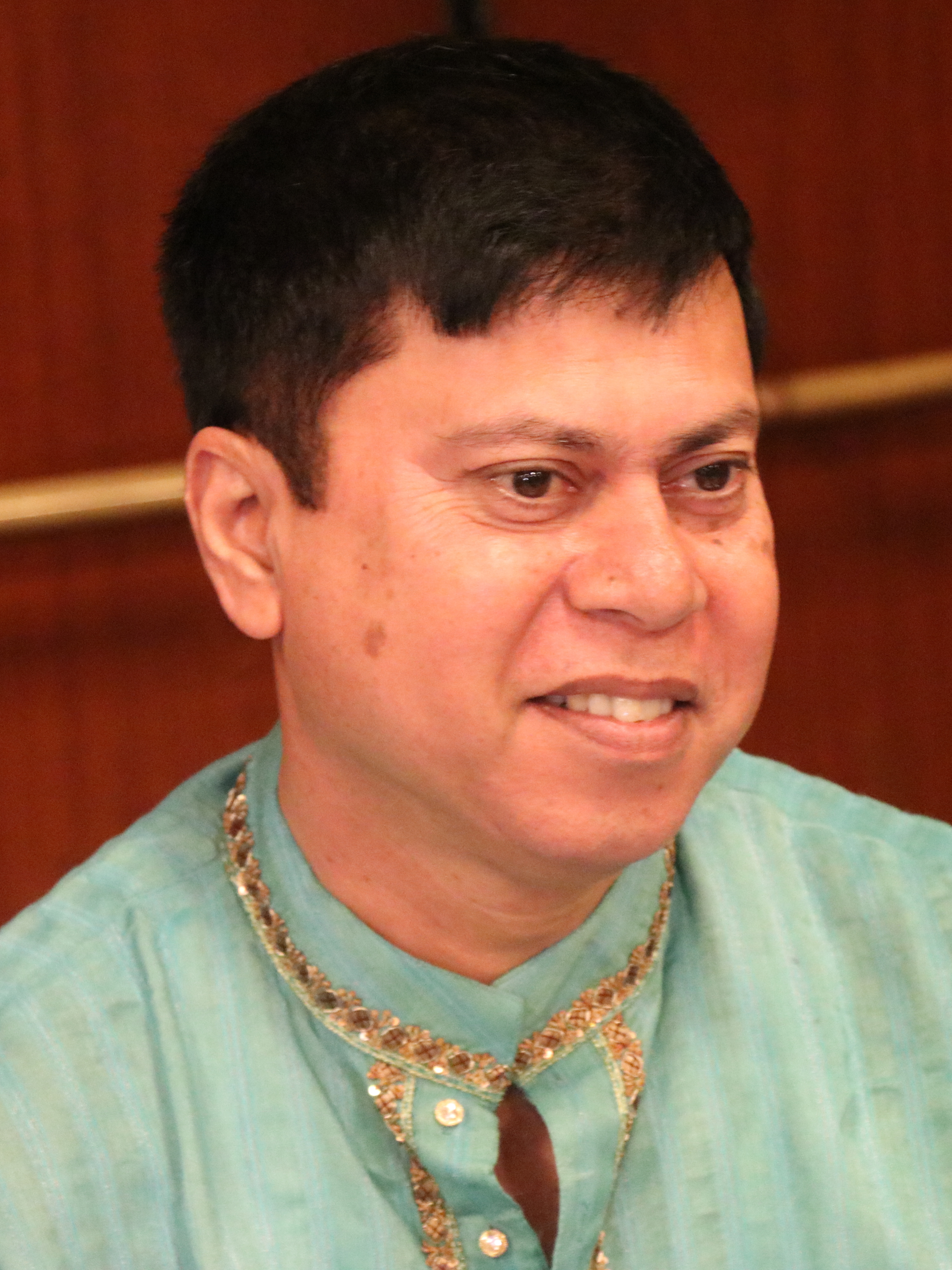
- Minhajul Abedin in 2018

Personal information
- Full name: Minhajul Abedin Nannu
- Born: 25 September 1965 (age 61); Chittagong, East Pakistan
- Batting: Right-handed
- Bowling: Right-arm offbreak
- Relatives: Nurul Abedin (brother)

International information
- National side: Bangladesh (1986–1999)
- ODI debut (cap 6): 31 March 1986 v Pakistan
- Last ODI: 31 May 1999 v Pakistan
- ODI shirt no.: 15

Career statistics
Competition	ODI	FC	LA
Matches	27	24	65
Runs scored	453	1,709	1,567
Batting average	18.87	51.78	27.98
100s/50s	0/2	4/9	1/12
Top score	68*	210	109*
Balls bowled	546	841	966
Wickets	13	12	20
Bowling average	39.30	27.66	40.25
5 wickets in innings	0	0	0
10 wickets in match	0	0	0
Best bowling	2/39	3/27	2/39
Catches/stumpings	2/–	20/–	14/–
- Source: ESPNcricinfo, 13 February 2017

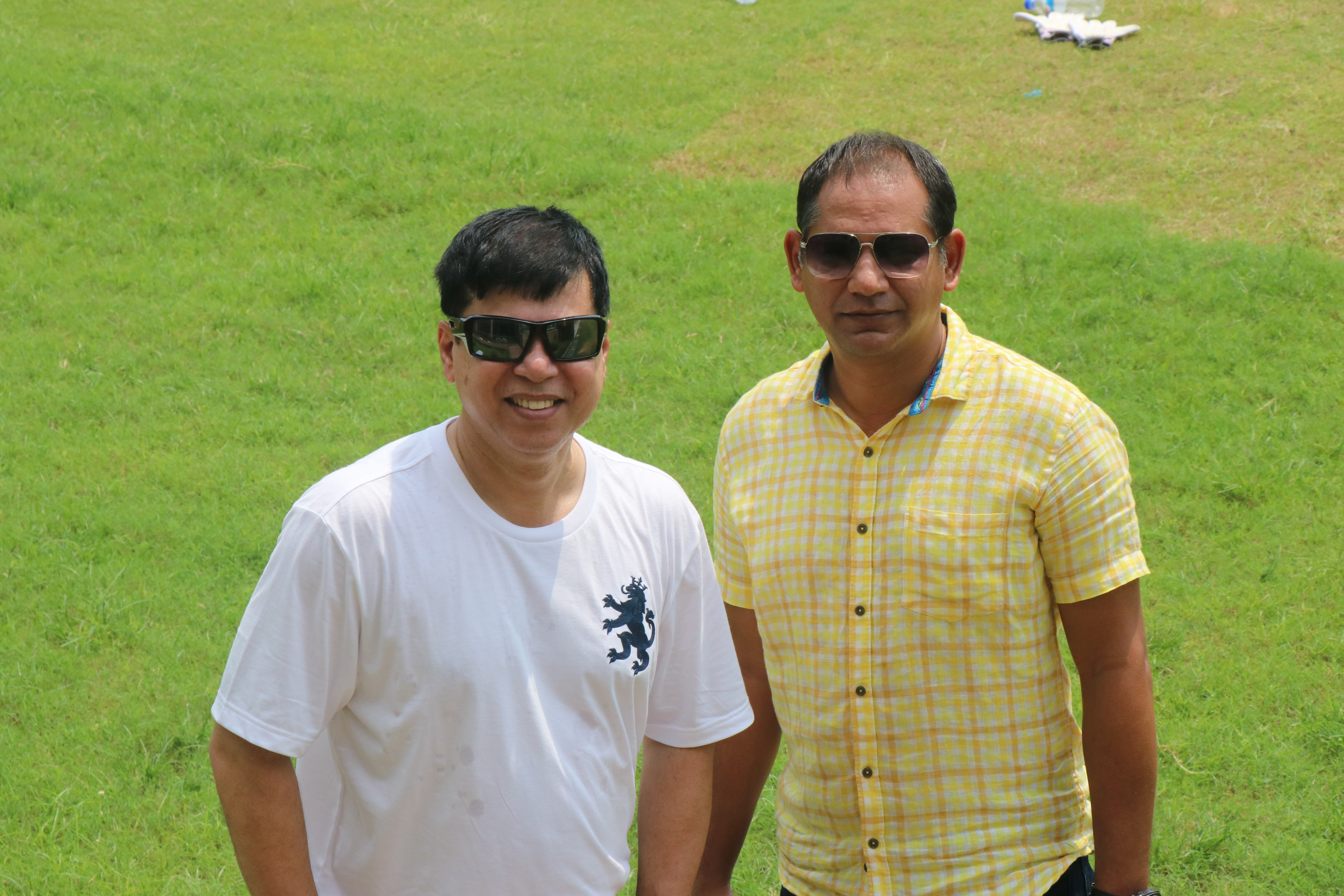
Minhajul Abedin and Habibul Bashar on field as selectors of BCB, 2018

Minhajul Abedin Nannu (Bengali: মিনহাজুল আবেদিন নান্নু; born 25 September 1965) is a Bangladeshi former cricketer who played in 27 One Day Internationals from 1986 to 1999. He captained Bangladesh twice, during the 1990–91 Asia Cup. In local cricket arena he is more commonly known by his nickname, "Nannu".

Minhajul Abedin was one of the chief selectors of BCB, along with Akram Khan and Habibul Bashar.

== Personal life ==
His elder brother, Nurul Abedin played four One Day Internationals for Bangladesh.

== Domestic career ==
Nannu caught the attention of the cricket selectors in the early 1980s. In December 1983, he was selected to tour West Bengal, where he wasn't very successful. He enjoyed greater success playing for the Bangladesh Tigers in the 1984 South-East Asia Cup. His top score of 60 against the Bangladesh national team went in vain, but his 44 against Hong Kong at Chittagong helped the Tigers win the match. Bowling gentle medium pacers, he took 2/8 against Singapore. After that, he enjoyed a successful tour of Kenya with the national team.

Playing for Abahani, he was consistently amongst the runs in the domestic cricket in 1984–85. But when he failed against the touring Lankans in March 1985, and against the Omar Quareshi XI in January 86, many started to doubt his credentials as an international cricketer. However, he performed consistently during the Pakistan tour in March. He didn't get any big score, but was consistently amongst the runs. After this, he became a regular member of the national side for more than a decade. A right-handed middle order batsman, Minhajul Abedin was part of Bangladesh's inaugural ODI game, against Pakistan at Moratuwa in 1985–86.

Minhajul Abedin didn't get a chance to play Test cricket for Bangladesh. However he did enjoy a brief first-class career, finishing with a record of 1709 runs at 51.78.

In 1998 in a match between Bangladesh and Bhahawalpur, he along with Khaled Mahmud set the highest 5th wicket partnership ever in List A cricket history(267*).

== International career ==
Following the performance of the national side in the 1986 ICC Trophy in England, BCCB decided to concentrate on domestic cricket over the next few seasons. The only major international cricket events for Bangladesh, in this period, were the 2nd South East Asia Cup in Hong Kong, in January 1988, (Bangladesh won the cup to qualify for the 4th Asia Cup in 1990) and the 3rd Asia Cup in Bangladesh, in Oct. 1988. (Bangladesh, as hosts, had automatically qualified). However, during the 1989–90 season there were regular international cricket for Bangladesh, as the national team prepared for the 4th ICC Trophy in Netherlands.

A decade later he bowed out of international cricket, in the 1999 Cricket World Cup. After making 5 against the West Indies in their opening game, he found form with an unbeaten 68 in a win against Scotland which gave him the man of the match award. Another unbeaten half century came in his next game, against the eventual champions Australia. Despite failing with the bat in the final game, against Pakistan in Northampton, he played a major part in an upset victory by taking 1/29 off 7 overs with his offspin. It was Bangladesh's first ever win over a Test playing team.

Minhajul Abedin played in four ICC Trophy tournaments for Bangladesh. In 1986, he failed with the bat only averaging 25.16. His highest score of 50 came against Kenya. He was more successful with the ball. Bowling slow off cutters, Minhajul Abedin took 5 wickets at an impressive average of 9.40. Nannu was the Vice-Captain and a vital member of the team that finished third in the 1990 ICC Trophy tournament in Netherlands. He performed consistently with the bat, throughout the tournament. His total of 236 runs was the highest for his team. His top score (57) came in the Semi-Final against the eventual champions Zimbabwe. With the ball, he took 11 wickets at (21.18). His took 3/23 against Bermuda and 3/29 against Kenya. Bangladesh failed to reach the Semi-Finals four years later in Kenya, but Abadin performed commendably. He scored a total of 189 runs with two half centuries. He also captured 16 wickets at 14.75 a piece. Finally, he was the most experienced player of the triumphant campaign of 1997. There he scored a total of 185 runs and took 6 wickets.

=== Captaincy ===
In 1988, Nannu was made the Vice captain to Gazi Ashraf Lipu. After two years as the deputy, he was elevated to national team captaincy in 1990–91. Under his captaincy, Bangladesh lost both the games of the Asia cup. The team, however, performed commendably against much stronger oppositions. Bangladesh, as expected won the 1992 South East Asia cup in Singapore. But perhaps his biggest success as a captain came in December of that year, as he led his side to a win over the Sri Lanka 'A' side in Dhaka, in 1992.
