= Kamran Rasheed =

Pakistani American cricketer and cricket administrator

Personal information
- Full name: Kamran Rasheed Khan
- Born: 1949 (age 76–77)
- Batting: Right-handed
- Role: Wicketkeeper

Domestic team information
- Years: Team
- 1964/65: Lahore Education Board
- 1965/66-1970/71: Punjab University
- 1969/70: Pakistan Railways
- 1968/69: Lahore

Career statistics
Competition	First-class
Matches	31
Runs scored	1,217
Batting average	27.65
100s/50s	1/8
Top score	117
Balls bowled	96
Wickets	2
Bowling average	33.00
5 wickets in innings	0
10 wickets in match	0
Best bowling	1/18
Catches/stumpings	38/7
- Source: ESPNcricinfo, 2 May 2016

Kamran Rasheed Khan (born 1949) is a Pakistani-American former first-class cricketer and a cricket administrator who played for the United States national cricket team from 1979 to 1990. He is also known to have played domestic cricket for Lahore, Pakistan Railways, and the Punjab University cricket team from 1964–65 to 1970–71 as a wicket-keeper. He was also the President of United States of America Cricket Association for one year, from 1999 to 2000. Khan was the coach for Haverford College's cricket team since 1974.
