= Raqibul Hasan (cricketer, born 1953) =

Bangladeshi International cricketer

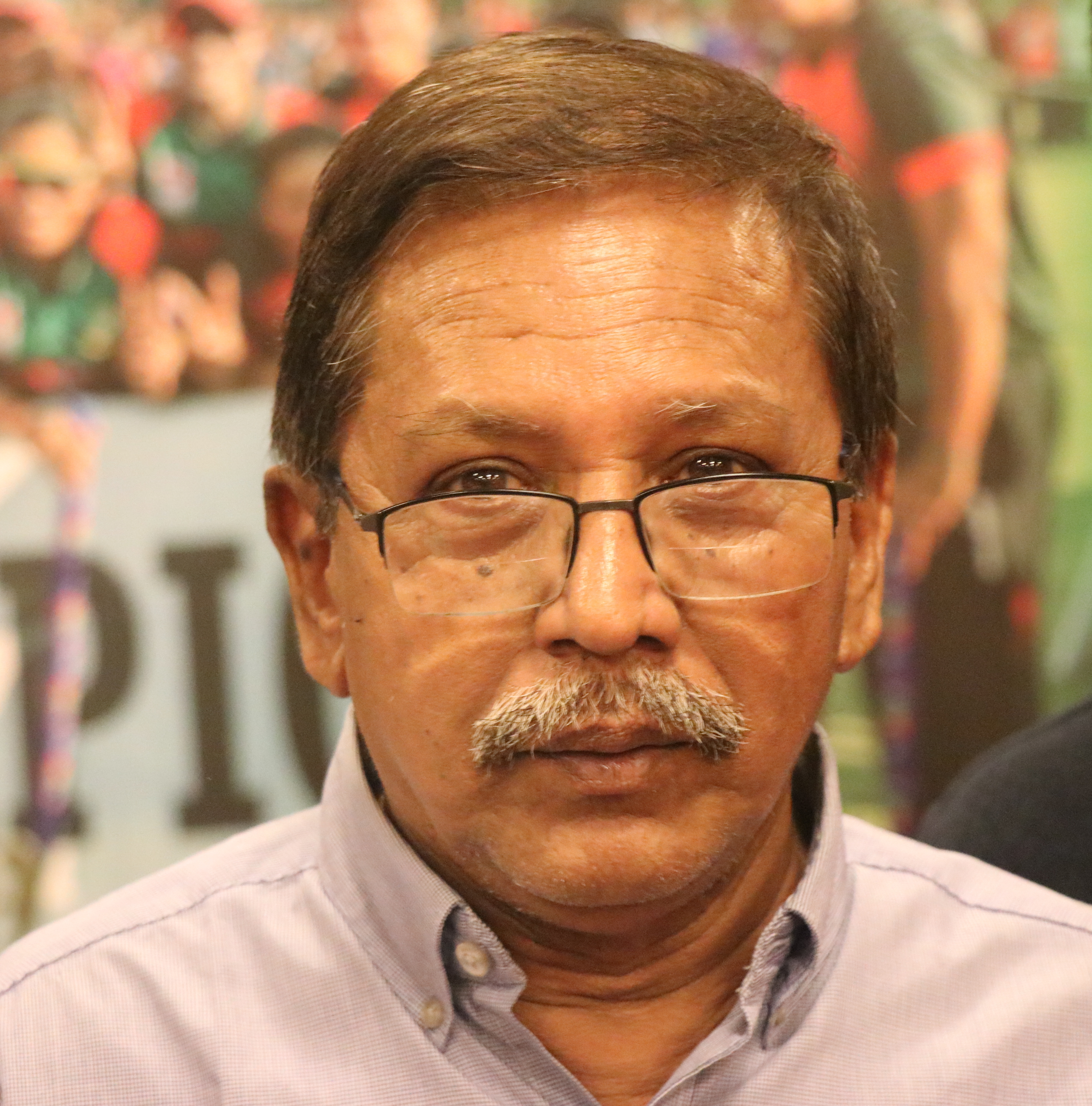

Personal information
- Full name: Raqibul Hasan
- Born: 1 January 1953 (age 73); Dacca, East Bengal, Pakistan
- Batting: Right-handed
- Role: Batsman, Occasional Wicket-keeper, Match referee

International information
- National side: Bangladesh
- ODI debut (cap 9): 31 March 1986 v Pakistan
- Last ODI: 2 April 1986 v Sri Lanka

Career statistics
Competition	ODIs
Matches	2
Runs scored	17
Batting average	8.50
100s/50s	-/-
Top score	12
Balls bowled	1
Wickets	–
Bowling average	–
5 wickets in innings	–
10 wickets in match	n/a
Best bowling	–
Catches/stumpings	1/-
- Source: ESPNCricinfo, 13 February 2006

ASM Raqibul Hasan (born 15 January 1953) is a Bangladeshi former cricketer who played in two ODIs in 1986. He is widely regarded as one of the best Bangladeshi batsman of his era. After retiring from international cricket, he has become a match referee. He won the Independence Award in 2023 for his contribution to the field of sports.

== Early years ==
An opening batsman, Raqibul Hasan made his first-class debut in 1968–69 at the age of 16, and was soon selected to represent Pakistan's U19 team against the English Schoolboys. He was twelfth man in a Test match against New Zealand at Dhaka in 1969–70. Barely sixteen at the time, he seemed sure to have a lengthy Test career ahead of him.

However, on 26 February 1971 a match started at Dhaka in the Bangabandhu Stadium. It was a four-day match against the Commonwealth side. The Pakistan team was playing and he was picked to play for them. At 18 years old he became the first and only Bengali to play for a full-strength Pakistan Test team. The match couldn't be finished as on the last day demonstrations erupted in the city and the stadium was invaded. Within a month of his debut, events in his homeland of East Pakistan took a shocking turn, and he was forced to flee for his life.

It would be nine long months before Bangladesh won its independence, at the cost of millions of lives. In Raqibul Hasan's family there were six casualties. On top of that, he lost his best friend, Haleem Chaudhri, who was his opening partner for East Pakistan and his roommate on tour. And he lost his cricketing godfather, Mushtaq, the man who spotted him as a boy and gave him his first chance at club level.

== In independent Bangladesh ==
After returning to Bangladesh, Raqibul Hasan became a key figure in building Bangladesh cricket. He led the side in their return to the international arena. In December 1976, when the visiting MCC started their tour with a two-day match at Rajshahi against North Zone, he was named captain and top scored with 73 in the second innings. He bettered that, scoring 74 for South Zone at Jessore. But his proudest moment of the season came at Dhaka as he was part of the Bangladesh team (led by Shamim Kabir) that played in the three-day unofficial Test match against MCC in January 1977. This historic match marked the resumption of international cricket in Dhaka.

== In full ODIs ==
Raqibul Hasan played in two ODIs for Bangladesh. He scored 5 against Pakistan, and 12 against Sri Lanka in the second Asia Cup in 1986.

== In ICC Trophy ==
Raqibul Hasan played in three ICC Trophy tournaments. In 1979, he scored 52 runs in 4 matches with a highest of 34 against Canada. He did better in 1982, scoring 167 runs at an average of 27.83. His highest, 42, came against West Africa. Finally, in 1986, he scored 121 runs at an average of 24.19. His unbeaten 47 helped Bangladesh beat Argentina. He retired from international cricket after the 1986 ICC Trophy.

Year	Matches	Runs	Average	Highest Score	100 / 50
1979	4	52	13.00	34	0/0
1982	7	167	27.83	42	0/0
1986	6	121	24.20	47*	0/0
Overall	17	340	22.67	47*	0/0

Raqibul Hasan: Significant Performances in International cricket
Date	Opposition	Venue	Performance
Dec. 1976	MCC	Rajshahi	73
Jan 1977	MCC	Jessore	74
Feb. 1978	Decan Blues(India)	Dhaka	64
Jan 1981	MCC	Chittagong	78*
Jan 1981	MCC	Dhaka	51 & 51
Dec. 1983	Chandan Nagar	West Bengal(India)	77
Feb. 1984	Kenya	Nairobi	64
March 1986	Rawalpindi	Rawalpindi	49
June 1986	Argentina (ICC Trophy)	England	47*

== Raqibul as captain ==
He had two spells as captain of Bangladesh; first during 1977–79 and second during the 1983–84 season. He had a difficult time during the Sri Lanka series in January 1978. The Sri Lankan team was far superior, winning all the three-day unofficial Test matches. Raqibul Hasan failed to convert quite a few starts into any score of substance. He (and his team) did better, against the Indians (Deccan Blues) (led by former Indian captain Ajit Wadekar) in February 1978. His defiant 64 helped the local side reach 320/9, despite the efforts of Indian leg spinner M. V. Narasimha Rao, who took 6 for 120. This was the first time Bangladesh crossed the 300 mark in an international match. However, Raqibul failed with the bat the following season, against a relatively weak MCC squad. It was apparent that the captaincy was becoming a burden for him. So, the selectors chose wicketkeeper-batsman Shafiq-ul-Haq Hira as captain for the 1st ICC Trophy in England in 1979.

Raqibul's second spell as captain came during the busy 1983–84 season. He led Bangladesh to victory in the 1984 South-East Asia Cup in Dhaka in January. In 1985, Gazi Ashraf Hossain Lipu was named as the new captain.

Preceded by Shamim Kabir; Shafiq-ul-Haq	Bangladeshi cricket Captains; 1977–79; 1983–84	Succeeded by Shafiq-ul-Haq; Gazi Ashraf

== Domestic cricket ==
Raqibul played his League cricket in Dhaka for Victoria Sporting Club and Mohammedan Sporting Club.
