= Jahangir Shah =

Bangladeshi International Cricketer

Personal information
- Born: 19 July 1949 (age 77); Kushtia, East Bengal, Pakistan
- Batting: Right-handed
- Bowling: Right-arm fast-medium
- Relatives: Nadir Shah (brother)

International information
- National side: Bangladesh
- ODI debut (cap 5): 31 March 1986 v Pakistan
- Last ODI: 28 April 1990 v New Zealand
- Source: , 13 February 2006

Jahangir Shah Badshah (born 19 July 1949) is a Bangladeshi former cricketer who played in five One Day Internationals from 1986 to 1990. He is sometimes known on scoresheets by his nickname Badshah.

Shah made his debut in the national side in 1979, and until his retirement in 1990, he was the most reliable all-rounder of the side. He was the team's most effective new-ball bowler, and as a batsman he contributed in different positions, as a tail-ender, as a night watchman and occasionally also as an opener.

He was one of the players who took part in Bangladesh's first ever official ODI (against Pakistan at Moratuwa in 1986). Though he was out for a duck, he took 2/23 from 9 overs.

Apart from being a successful cricketer, Shah was also a very competent footballer, and played for Abahani Krira Chakra until 1975.

== Bowling style ==
He wasn't the fastest bowler in the world, but he had the ability to swing the new ball, especially away from the right-handers. Many still regard him as the best swing bowler Bangladesh ever had. Unfortunately, the conditions in Bangladesh, (and the Indian subcontinent in general) are not very suitable for swing bowling. Not surprisingly, some of his best bowling efforts came abroad. For example, his 4/17 against Canada in ICC Trophy (England) in 1979 and 4/39 against Malaysia in ICC Trophy (England) in 1986. No less impressive was his 1/7 from 10 overs (including 5 maidens) against Fiji in Bangladesh's first match in 79 ICC Trophy. His best bowling at home soil came in 1985, against the touring Lankans. He took 4/89- his victims included the Lankan openers Amal Silva & Sidath Wettimuny.

== Family connection ==
Two of his brothers, Munna Shah and Nadir Shah, also played international cricket. Nadir Shah was an international umpire. His cousin, Nazim Shirazi was considered the finest cricketing talent of the country in the early 80's. But after a couple of seasons in international cricket, he went abroad to pursue his studies.
