= 1979 ICC Trophy squads =

Fifteen teams participated in the 1979 ICC Trophy, the inaugural edition of the tournament. Fourteen of those were members of the International Cricket Council (ICC), while the other team was Wales, participating by invitation.

== Argentina ==
Only players who appeared in at least one match at the tournament are listed. The leading run-scorer is marked with a dagger (†) and the leading wicket-taker with a double dagger (‡).

- Douglas Annand
- Derek Culley
- Tony Ferguson †
- Malcolm Gibson
- Robert Kirton
- Martin Martinez
- Alan Morris ‡

- Christopher Nino
- Michael Ryan
- Peter Stocks
- Charles Tudor
- Rafael Villamil
- Brian Ward

Source: ESPNcricinfo

== Bangladesh ==
Only players who appeared in at least one match at the tournament are listed. The leading run-scorer is marked with a dagger (†) and the leading wicket-taker with a double dagger (‡).

- Ashraful Haque †‡
- Belayet Hossain
- Daulat Zaman
- Dipu Roy Chowdhury
- Jahangir Shah
- Mujibul Haque
- Mustafizur Rahman

- Najmun Noor
- Omar Khaled
- Raqibul Hasan
- Shafiq-ul-Haq
- Yousuf Rahman
- Ziaul Islam

Source: ESPNcricinfo

== Bermuda ==
Only players who appeared in at least one match at the tournament are listed. The leading run-scorer is marked with a dagger (†) and the leading wicket-taker with a double dagger (‡).

- Joseph Bailey
- Colin Blades
- Gladstone Brown
- Barry de Couto
- Noel Gibbons
- Elvin James

- Clarence Parfitt
- Winston Reid †
- Lionel Thomas
- Winston Trott ‡
- John Tucker
- Clevie Wade

Source: ESPNcricinfo

== Canada ==
Only players who appeared in at least one match at the tournament are listed. The leading run-scorer is marked with a dagger (†) and the leading wicket-taker with a double dagger (‡).

- Charles Baksh
- Garnet Brisbane
- Christopher Chappell
- Franklyn Dennis
- Cornelius Henry
- Tariq Javed
- Cecil Marshall

- Bryan Mauricette
- Jitendra Patel
- Glenroy Sealy
- Martin Stead
- John Valentine
- John Vaughan †‡

Source: ESPNcricinfo

== Denmark ==
Only players who appeared in at least one match at the tournament are listed. The leading run-scorer is marked with a dagger (†) and the leading wicket-taker with a double dagger (‡).

- Jørn Beier
- Ole Beier
- Klaus Buus
- Keld Kristensen
- Carsten Morild ‡
- Claus Morild

- Henrik Mortensen †
- Ole Mortensen ‡
- Torben Nielsen
- Morten Petersson
- Bent Rossen
- Steen Thomsen

Source: ESPNcricinfo

== East Africa ==
Only players who appeared in at least one match at the tournament are listed. The leading run-scorer is marked with a dagger (†) and the leading wicket-taker with a double dagger (‡).

- Zulfiqar Ali ‡
- Keith Arnold
- Bharat Desai
- Hitesh Mehta
- P. D. Mehta
- Ramesh Patel
- Yusuf Patel

- Majid Pandor
- Abdul Rehman
- Jawahir Shah †
- Charanjive Sharma
- Narendra Thakker
- Jaswinder Warah

Source: ESPNcricinfo

== Fiji ==
Only players who appeared in at least one match at the tournament are listed. The leading run-scorer is marked with a dagger (†) and the leading wicket-taker with a double dagger (‡).

- Alan Apted
- Cecil Browne †
- Peni Dakainivanua ‡
- Metusela Isimeli ‡
- Roderick Jepsen
- Joeli Nambuka
- Seci Sekinini

- Jaswant Singh
- Uraia Sorovakatini
- Isoa Suka
- Inoke Tambualevu
- Frederick Valentine
- Ilikena Vuli
- Apenisa Wanggatambu

Source: ESPNcricinfo

== Israel ==
Only players who appeared in at least one match at the tournament are listed. The leading run-scorer is marked with a dagger (†) and the leading wicket-taker with a double dagger (‡).

- Larry Barnett
- Aaron Benjamin
- Howard Horowitz
- Michael Jacob
- Barry Kanpol
- Jerrold Kessel
- Michael Mohnblatt

- Zion Moses
- David Moss †
- Stanley Perlman
- Nissam Reuben
- Reuben Reuben ‡
- Isaac Solomon
- Leslie Susser

Source: ESPNcricinfo

== Malaysia ==
Only players who appeared in at least one match at the tournament are listed. The leading run-scorer is marked with a dagger (†) and the leading wicket-taker with a double dagger (‡).

- Alwi Zaman
- Banerji Nair
- Bhupinder Singh Gill
- C. Navaratnam
- Chan Yow Choy
- Harris Abu Bakar

- Hatta Pattabongi
- K. Kamalanathan
- K. Sekar ‡
- Mahinder Singh †
- Rasiah Ratnalingham
- Tah Choo Beng

Source: ESPNcricinfo

== Netherlands ==
Only players who appeared in at least one match at the tournament are listed. The leading run-scorer is marked with a dagger (†) and the leading wicket-taker with a double dagger (‡).

- Edouard Abendanon
- Ton Bakker †
- Peter Entrop
- Mar Flohil
- Steven Lubbers
- Rene Schoonheim

- Jan Spits
- Menso van Meurs
- Chris van Schouwenburg
- Rob van Weelde ‡
- Peter van Wel

Source: ESPNcricinfo

== Papua New Guinea ==
Only players who appeared in at least one match at the tournament are listed. The leading run-scorer is marked with a dagger (†) and the leading wicket-taker with a double dagger (‡).

- Nigel Agonia
- Kila Alewa ‡
- Vele Amini
- Lou Ao
- Tau Ao
- La'a Aukopi
- Charles Harrison

- Api Leka †
- Sam Malum
- Vavine Pala
- Ilinome Tarua
- Pala Ura
- Taunao Vai

Source: ESPNcricinfo

== Singapore ==
Only players who appeared in at least one match at the tournament are listed. The leading run-scorer is marked with a dagger (†) and the leading wicket-taker with a double dagger (‡).

- Mukhtar Ahmed
- Christopher da Silva
- Goh Swee Heng
- Stephen Houghton †
- Pranlal Ishwarlal
- Mohanvelu Jeevanathan
- Frederick Martens

- Rex Martens
- Mahesh Mehta
- Stacey Muruthi
- Sitharam Sethivail
- Harnam Singh
- Pritam Singh
- Lawrence Young Ken Sen ‡

Source: ESPNcricinfo

== Sri Lanka ==
Only players who appeared in at least one match at the tournament are listed. The leading run-scorer is marked with a dagger (†) and the leading wicket-taker with a double dagger (‡).

- Somachandra de Silva ‡
- Stanley de Silva
- Roy Dias
- Ranjan Gunatilleke
- Rohan Jayasekera
- Sunil Jayasinghe
- Sridharan Jeganathan

- Ranjan Madugalle
- Duleep Mendis †
- Tony Opatha
- Sudath Pasqual
- Anura Tennekoon
- Bandula Warnapura ‡
- Sunil Wettimuny

Source: ESPNcricinfo

== United States ==
Only players who appeared in at least one match at the tournament are listed. The leading run-scorer is marked with a dagger (†) and the leading wicket-taker with a double dagger (‡).

- Masood Akhtar
- Ivan Atherley
- Walter Bovell
- Michael Gordon
- Stephen Jones ‡
- Hasib Khan
- Ophnell Larrier

- Anil Lashkari †
- Neil Lashkari
- Sri Nagesh
- Kamran Rasheed ‡
- John Reid
- Wayne Stuger

Source: ESPNcricinfo

== Wales ==
Only players who appeared in at least one match at the tournament are listed. The leading run-scorer is marked with a dagger (†) and the leading wicket-taker with a double dagger (‡).

- John Bell
- Stuart Carey
- William Edwards
- Geoff Ellis
- Alan Geoghegan ‡
- Wayne Harries

- Jeffris Hopkins †
- David Jones
- David Knight
- Nigel Owen
- Billy Slade
- Geoff Williams

Source: ESPNcricinfo

== Sources ==
- CricketArchive: Averages by teams, ICC Trophy 1979
- ESPNcricinfo: ICC Trophy, 1979 / Statistics
