= 1982 ICC Trophy squads =

Sixteen teams participated in the 1982 ICC Trophy, the second edition of the tournament. Five of those teams – Gibraltar, Hong Kong, Kenya, West Africa, and Zimbabwe – were making their tournament debuts.

== Bangladesh ==
Only players who appeared in at least one match at the tournament are listed. The leading run-scorer is marked with a dagger (†) and the leading wicket-taker with a double dagger (‡).

- Anwarul Amin ‡
- Dipu Roy Chowdhury
- Gazi Ashraf
- Jahangir Shah
- Nazam Shirazi
- Omar Khaled
- Rafiqul Alam
- Raqibul Hasan
- Sadhrul Anam
- Samiur Rahman
- Shafiq-ul-Haq
- Tanjeeb Ahsan
- Yousuf Rahman †

Source: ESPNcricinfo

== Bermuda ==
Only players who appeared in at least one match at the tournament are listed. The leading run-scorer is marked with a dagger (†) and the leading wicket-taker with a double dagger (‡).

- Joseph Bailey
- Colin Blades †
- Gladstone Brown
- Allan Douglas
- Noel Gibbons
- Elvin James ‡
- Adrian King
- Steven Lightbourne
- Winston Reid
- Wendell Smith
- Lionel Thomas
- Winston Trott
- John Tucker

Source: ESPNcricinfo

== Canada ==
Only players who appeared in at least one match at the tournament are listed. The leading run-scorer is marked with a dagger (†) and the leading wicket-taker with a double dagger (‡).

- Derek Abraham
- Rawle Cottle
- Stevenson Deare
- Ron Dipchand
- Andre Hakim
- Tariq Javed †
- Farooq Kirmani †
- Malcolm McKenzie
- Clement Neblett
- M. G. Patel
- Tatoo Seebalack
- Danny Singh
- Richard Stevens ‡
- John Vaughan

Source: ESPNcricinfo

== East Africa ==
Only players who appeared in at least one match at the tournament are listed. The leading run-scorer is marked with a dagger (†) and the leading wicket-taker with a double dagger (‡).

- Keith Arnold
- Balraj Bouri
- Bill Bourne
- Derek Capaccioli
- Bipin Desai ‡
- Pravin Desai
- Sajjad Lakha
- M. I. M. Lorgat
- D. C. Patel †
- Dinesh Patel
- Raghuvir Patel
- Vali Tarmohamed
- Narendra Thakker
- Sam Walusimbi

Source: ESPNcricinfo

== Fiji ==
Only players who appeared in at least one match at the tournament are listed. The leading run-scorer is marked with a dagger (†) and the leading wicket-taker with a double dagger (‡).

- Alan Apted
- Cecil Browne
- W. Browne
- Peni Dakainivanua
- Pensioni Gauna ‡
- Metusela Isimeli
- Roderick Jepsen
- Iliaisa Kacisolomone
- Tikiko Korocowiri
- Joeli Mateyawa
- Jack McGoon
- Seremaia Rayasi
- Seci Sekinini
- Jaswant Singh †
- Inoke Tambualevu
- Ilikena Vuli ‡

Source: ESPNcricinfo

== Gibraltar ==
Only players who appeared in at least one match at the tournament are listed. The leading run-scorer is marked with a dagger (†) and the leading wicket-taker with a double dagger (‡).

- Steve Boylan
- Joe Buzaglo
- Tim Buzaglo
- Tom Finlayson
- Charles Head
- K. A. Jacks ‡
- Vince Kenny
- Joseph Olivero
- Lionel Peterson
- Alan Procter
- Willie Scott
- R. Truscott †
- T. W. J. Wright

Source: ESPNcricinfo

== Hong Kong ==
Only players who appeared in at least one match at the tournament are listed. The leading run-scorer is marked with a dagger (†) and the leading wicket-taker with a double dagger (‡).

- Peter Anderson
- Gordon Bacon ‡
- Brian Catton
- Rob Gill
- Des Greenwood
- Gopal Lalchandani
- Andy Lorimer †
- Peter Olsen
- Dermot Reeve
- Martin Sabine
- Rod Starling
- Nigel Stearns
- Bob Toes
- Yarman Vachha
- Steve Waller

Source: ESPNcricinfo

== Israel ==
Only players who appeared in at least one match at the tournament are listed. The leading run-scorer is marked with a dagger (†) and the leading wicket-taker with a double dagger (‡).

- Hillel Awasker
- Aaron Benjamin
- Howard Horowitz
- Barry Kanpol
- Jerrold Kessel
- Alan Moss
- David Moss
- Stanley Perlman †
- Nissam Reuben ‡
- Michael Schwartz
- Isaac Solomon
- Leslie Susser
- Valice Worrell

Source: ESPNcricinfo

== Kenya ==
Only players who appeared in at least one match at the tournament are listed. The leading run-scorer is marked with a dagger (†) and the leading wicket-taker with a double dagger (‡).

- Avinash Chotai
- Bharat Desai
- Suresh Joshi
- Muslim Kanji
- K. S. Mankoo
- Hitesh Mehta †
- Gulam Musa
- Jagdish Patel
- Ramesh Patel
- Abdul Rehman
- Anil Sheikh
- Zahoor Sheikh‡
- Naguib Verjee

Source: ESPNcricinfo

== Malaysia ==
Only players who appeared in at least one match at the tournament are listed. The leading run-scorer is marked with a dagger (†) and the leading wicket-taker with a double dagger (‡).

- Amarjit Singh Gill
- Azmi Majid
- Bhupinder Singh Gill
- Banerji Nair †
- Chan Yow Choy
- Christopher Lewis
- D. Hector
- Harris Abu Bakar
- K. Kamalanathan ‡
- K. Sekar
- Karunakarer Selvaratnam
- Khoo Kim Khuang
- Ranjit Singh
- S. Bell
- Tan Kim Hing
- Zainon Mat

Source: ESPNcricinfo

== Netherlands ==
Only players who appeared in at least one match at the tournament are listed. The leading run-scorer is marked with a dagger (†) and the leading wicket-taker with a double dagger (‡).

- Dik Abed ‡
- David Defoe
- Alex de la Mar
- Ronnie Elferink ‡
- Peter Entrop
- Steven Lubbers
- Cees Ruskamp
- Rene Schoonheim
- Mark van Heijningen
- Rob van Weelde ‡
- Hendrik van Wijk
- Huib Visée

Source: ESPNcricinfo

== Papua New Guinea ==
Only players who appeared in at least one match at the tournament are listed. The leading run-scorer is marked with a dagger (†) and the leading wicket-taker with a double dagger (‡).

- Nigel Agonia
- Vele Amini
- Tau Ao
- La'a Aukopi
- Raki Ila
- Kosta Ilaraki
- Arua Ipi
- Kila Kalo ‡
- Api Leka
- Kula Loi
- William Maha
- Vavine Pala †
- Vele Patu
- Gamu Ravu
- Taunao Vai
- Keimelo Vuivagi

Source: ESPNcricinfo

== Singapore ==
Only players who appeared in at least one match at the tournament are listed. The leading run-scorer is marked with a dagger (†) and the leading wicket-taker with a double dagger (‡).

- Neelan Amarasuriya
- Christopher da Silva
- Abhijit Dass
- Isaac Gnanachandran
- Goh Swee Heng
- Champaklal Kantilal
- Frederick Martens †
- Rex Martens
- Stacey Muruthi
- Roger Oliveiro
- Mohan Rajalingham ‡
- Sitharam Sethivail
- Lawrence Young Ken Sen

Source: ESPNcricinfo

== United States ==
Only players who appeared in at least one match at the tournament are listed. The leading run-scorer is marked with a dagger (†) and the leading wicket-taker with a double dagger (‡).

- Sawar Ahmed
- Masood Akhtar
- Inder Bally
- Shamshad Durrani ‡
- Cyril Ernest
- Neil Lashkari †
- David Millener
- Kamran Rasheed
- B. B. Ramnanan
- John Reid
- Trevor Roberts
- Pete Smythe
- Wayne Stuger
- Kennedy Venkersammy
- Winston Walke

Source: ESPNcricinfo

== West Africa ==
Only players who appeared in at least one match at the tournament are listed. The leading run-scorer is marked with a dagger (†) and the leading wicket-taker with a double dagger (‡).

- Anthony Ayama ‡
- Segun Elliott †
- S. Erukanure
- J. W. F. George
- Ewa Henshaw
- Bode Karunwi ‡
- Sahr Kpundeh
- Edinam Nutsugah ‡
- Jacob Onyechi
- Deji Otegbeye
- Donald Ovberedjo
- Okon Ukpong
- A. Williams

Source: ESPNcricinfo

== Zimbabwe ==
Only players who appeared in at least one match at the tournament are listed. The leading run-scorer is marked with a dagger (†) and the leading wicket-taker with a double dagger (‡).

- Robin Brown
- Iain Butchart
- Kevin Curran †
- Maqbul Dudhia
- Duncan Fletcher
- Jack Heron
- Craig Hodgson
- Vince Hogg
- Edwin Hough
- David Houghton
- Andy Pycroft
- Peter Rawson ‡
- John Traicos
- Gary Wallace

Source: ESPNcricinfo

== Sources ==
- CricketArchive: Averages by teams, ICC Trophy 1982
- ESPNcricinfo: ICC Trophy, 1982 / Statistics
