= List of Bermudian first-class cricketers =

List of cricketers

This is a list of Bermudian first-class cricketers. First-class cricket matches are those between international teams or the highest standard of domestic teams in which teams have two innings each. Generally, matches are eleven players a side but there have been exceptions. Today, all matches must be scheduled to have at least three days' duration; historically, matches were played to a finish with no pre-defined timespan. This list is not limited to those who have played first-class cricket for Bermuda, and may include Bermudian players who played their first-class cricket elsewhere. The Bermuda cricket team played its maiden first-class match against a touring New Zealand team, in April 1972. The list is in alphabetical order.

Name	Career Span	Matches	Teams
Shiraz Ali	1972	1	Bermuda
Dennis Archer	2004	2	Bermuda
Joseph Bailey	1972	1	Bermuda
Roger Blades	1996-1998	1	Bermuda
Glen Blakeney	2004	1	Bermuda
Delyone Borden	2004-2006	3	Bermuda
Lionel Cann	2005-2006	2	Bermuda
Reggie Conyers	1909	3	Gentlemen of Philadelphia
Michael Crane	2004	1	Bermuda
Charles Daulphin	1972	1	Bermuda
Hasan Durham	2005-2006	4	Bermuda
Jekon Edness	2004	1	Bermuda
Chris Foggo	2005	2	Bermuda
Noel Gibbons	1972	1	Bermuda
David Hemp	1991-2006	236	Bermuda, England A, First-class Counties Select XI, Glamorgan, Warwickshire
Alma Hunt	1933-1938	2	GC Grant's XI, Scotland
Kevin Hurdle	2004-2006	5	Bermuda
Curtis Jackson	2005	1	Bermuda
Lloyd James	1972	1	Bermuda
Stefan Kelly	2006	1	Bermuda
Dwayne Leverock	2004-2006	8	Bermuda
Kamau Leverock	2015-2017	4	Cardiff MCC University
Dean Minors	2005-2006	6	Bermuda
Daniel Morgan	2005	1	Bermuda
Saleem Mukuddem	2004-2006	8	Bermuda
Steven Outerbridge	2004-2006	4	Bermuda
Clarence Parfitt	1972	1	Bermuda
Oliver Pitcher	2004	1	Bermuda
Delray Rawlins	2017-	10	Sussex County Cricket Club
Shannon Rayner	2010	4	Bermuda
Eldon Raynor	1972	1	Bermuda
Sheridan Raynor	1972	1	Bermuda
Jacobi Robinson	2005	1	Bermuda
Randall Robinson	2008	1	Bermuda
Irving Romaine	2004-2006	7	Bermuda
Rupert Scotland	1958-1972	2	Bermuda, Leeward Islands
Clay Smith	2004-2006	8	Bermuda
Ryan Steede	2004-2006	5	Bermuda
Graham Strange	2005	1	Bermuda
Rodney Trott	2006	1	Bermuda
Winston Trott	1972	1	Bermuda
Janeiro Tucker	2005-2006	6	Bermuda
Kwame Tucker	2005-2006	3	Bermuda
Reginald Tucker	2004	1	Bermuda
Dennis Wainwright	1972	1	Bermuda
Wendell White	2004	1	Bermuda

== See also ==
- Bermudian cricket team
- List of Bermudian ODI cricketers
- First-class cricket
