= 1979 ICC Trophy =

International cricket tournament

- Dates: 22 May – 21 June 1979
- Administrator: International Cricket Council
- Cricket format: Limited overs cricket
- Tournament format(s): Round-robin and Knockout
- Host: England
- Champions: Sri Lanka (1st title)
- Runners-up: Canada
- Participants: 15
- Most runs: (Sri Lanka) Duleep Mendis (221)
- Most wickets: (Canada) John Vaughan (14)

The 1979 ICC Trophy was a limited overs cricket tournament held in England between 22 May and 21 June 1979. It was the inaugural ICC Trophy tournament to be staged, with matches between the 15 participating teams played over 60 overs a team and with white clothing and red balls. All matches were played in the Midlands.

The tournament served as the Cricket World Cup qualification process – the two finalists, Sri Lanka and Canada, qualified to take part in the 1979 World Cup. The World Cup began on 9 June, just three days after Sri Lanka and Canada qualified for it by winning their ICC Trophy semi-finals. The ICC Trophy final was held on 21 June at Worcestershire's ground at New Road, two days before the World Cup final. Sri Lanka won the first ICC Trophy defeating Canada by 60 runs in the final.

East Africa who played in the first World Cup did not qualify this time, which meant there would be no nation from the African region participating in the 1979 World Cup.

== Competition format ==
The 15 teams were divided into three groups of five. Each team played each other team in its group once in matches played between 22 May and 4 June, scoring four points for a win and two for a no-result (match started but not finished) or abandoned entirely without a ball being bowled. The three group winners and the team with the fourth-highest points total after the group stage went forward to the semi-finals, the top team playing the fourth-ranked team and the team with the second-highest number of points playing the third. Where teams finished with equal points totals, run rate was used to separate them.

== Group matches ==
Note: A number of matches used their allotted reserve day.

=== Group A ===
==== Points table ====
Pos	Team	Pld	W	L	Ab	NR	Pts	RR	Qualification
1	Bermuda	4	3	0	1	0	14	2.591	Advanced to Semi-finals as group winner
2	(East Africa cricket team) East Africa	4	2	1	0	1	10	−0.279	
3	Papua New Guinea	4	1	1	0	2	8	0.052	
4	Singapore	4	1	2	1	0	6	−0.589	
5	Argentina	4	0	3	0	1	2	−0.897	

Source: ESPNcricinfo

==== Fixtures ====
May 22, 1979
Scorecard

Argentina; 154/9 (60.0 overs)	v	Singapore; 155/9 (59.2 overs)
Tony Ferguson 43; Lawrence Young Ken Sen 5/44 (12 overs)		Goh Swee Heng 40; Alan Morris 4/25 (12 overs)

Singapore won by 1 wicket
Pickwick Cricket Club Ground, Birmingham
Umpires: PD Ogden (ENG)

- Toss unknown

May 22–23, 1979
Scorecard

Papua New Guinea; 101/8 (40.2 overs)	v	East Africa
Api Leka 51; Ramesh Patel 3/27 (12 Overs)

No result
Fordhouses Cricket Club Ground, Wolverhampton
Umpires: unknown

- Toss unknown
- Reserve day used

May 24, 1979
Scorecard

Argentina; 147 (59.2 overs)	v	East Africa; 148/5 (53.2 overs)
Tony Ferguson 44; Jaswinder Warah 3/13 (3.4 overs)		Narendra Thakker 44; Peter Stocks 3/18 (12 overs)

East Africa won by 5 wickets
Bulls Head Ground, Coventry
Umpires: unknown

- Toss unknown

24 May 1979
Scorecard

Papua New Guinea; 90 (38.5 overs)	v	Bermuda; 92/3 (23.2 overs)
Charles Harrison 25; Clevie Wade 3/16 (3.5 Overs)		Lionel Thomas 27; Api Leka 1/13 (3 Overs)

Bermuda won by 7 wickets
War Memorial Athletic Ground, Amblecote, Stourbridge
Umpires: unknown

- Toss unknown

May 29–30, 1979
Scorecard

Argentina; 86/4 (33.0 overs)	v	Papua New Guinea
Michael Ryan 30*; K Alewa 1/8 (8 Overs)

No result
Banbury Cricket Club Ground, Banbury
Umpires: unknown

- Toss unknown
- Reserve day used

May 29–30, 1979
Scorecard

Bermuda	v	Singapore

Match abandoned without a ball bowled
Fordhouses Cricket Club Ground, Wolverhampton
Umpires: unknown

- Reserve day used

May 31 – June 1st, 1979
Scorecard

Argentina; 81 (54.4 overs)	v	Bermuda; 85/1 (15.5 overs)
Malcolm Gibson 18; Clarence Parfitt 3/16 (12 Overs)		Winston Reid 43*; Douglas Annand 1/35 (7 Overs)

Bermuda won by 9 wickets
Haden Hill Park, Old Hill
Umpires: unknown

- Toss unknown
- Reserve day used

May 31st, 1979
Scorecard

Singapore; 131/9 (60.0 overs)	v	East Africa; 132/5 (52.2 overs)
RCK da Silva 33; Charanjive Sharma 3/11 (6 Overs)		Jawahir Shah 38; RCK da Silva 1/12 (6 Overs)

East Africa won by 5 wickets
London Road, Shrewsbury
Umpires: MV Panting (ENG) & WH Miles (ENG)

- Toss unknown

June 4, 1979
Scorecard

East Africa; 94/9 (60.0 overs)	v	Bermuda; 100/1 (29.0 overs)
Jawahir Shah 15; Winston Trott 3/8 (12 Overs)		Winston Reid (Bermudian cricketer) 59*; Hitesh Mehta 1/20 (10 Overs)

Bermuda won by 9 wickets
Bournville Cricket Ground, Bournville
Umpires: unknown

- Toss unknown

June 4, 1979
Scorecard

Papua New Guinea; 174 (55.1 overs)	v	Singapore; 87 (54.3 overs)
Api Leka 48; Lawrence Young Ken Sen 4/30 (9.1 Overs)		Rex Martens 26; K Alewa 3/13 (12 Overs)

Papua New Guinea won by 87 runs
West Bromwich Dartmouth Cricket Club Ground, West Bromwich
Umpires: unknown

- Toss unknown

=== Group B ===
==== Points Table ====
Pos	Team	Pld	W	L	Ab	NR	Pts	RR	Qualification
1	Denmark	4	4	0	0	0	16	0.759	Advanced to Semi-finals as group winner
2	Canada	4	3	1	0	0	12	0.429	Advanced to Semi-finals 4th team because of highest points
3	Bangladesh	4	2	2	0	0	8	0.031	
4	Fiji	4	0	3	1	0	2	−0.816	
5	Malaysia	4	0	3	1	0	2	−0.941	

Source: ESPNcricinfo

==== Fixtures ====
May 22–23, 1979
Scorecard

Canada; 185 (59.3 overs)	v	Malaysia; 141 (52.3 overs)
Cecil Marshall 77; Rasiah Ratnalingham 3/18 (12 Overs)		Mahinder Singh 35*; John Vaughan 4/33 (12 Overs)

Canada won by 44 runs
Warwick Cricket Club, Warwick
Umpires: Unknown

- Toss Unknown
- Reserve day used

May 22, 1979
Scorecard

Fiji; 89 (33.5 overs)	v	Denmark; 93/2 (35.1 overs)
Roderick Jepsen 14; Ole Mortensen 4/14 (12 Overs)		Henrik Mortensen 52*; P Dakai 2/18 (10 Overs)

Denmark won by 8 wickets
Orleton Park, Wellington
Umpires: Unknown

- Toss Unknown

May 24, 1979
Scorecard

Bangladesh; 103 (43.0 overs)	v	Fiji; 81 (35.2 overs)
Omar Khaled 28; Metusela Isimeli 3/14 (9 Overs)		Jaswant Singh 12; Ashraful Haq 7/23 (9.1 Overs)

Bangladesh won by 22 runs
Water Orton Cricket Club Ground, Water Orton
Umpires: Unknown

- Toss unknown
- Ashraful Haque became the first bowler to get 7 wickets in a single match in any ICC Trophy.

May 24, 1979
Scorecard

Malaysia; 150 (60.0 overs)	v	Denmark; 151/3 (40.0 overs)
Chan Yow Choy 28; Carsten Morild 3/32 (12 Overs)		Carsten Morild 66*; Bhupinder Singh Gill 2/27 (8 Overs)

Denmark won by 7 wickets
Chester Road North Ground, Kidderminster
Umpires: Unknown

- Toss unknown

May 29, 1979
Scorecard

Canada; 190/9 (60.0 overs)	v	Bangladesh; 141 (50.3 overs)
Franklyn Dennis 61; Jahangir Shah 4/17 (12 Overs)		Raqibul Hasan 34; John Vaughan 3/28 (12 Overs)

Canada won by 49 runs
Lichfield Cricket Club Ground, Lichfield
Umpires: Unknown

- Toss unknown

May 29–30, 1979
Scorecard

Fiji	v	Malaysia

Match abandoned without a ball bowled
Kenilworth Wardens Cricket Club, Kenilworth
Umpires: Unknown

- Reserve day used

May 31 – June 1, 1979
Scorecard

Malaysia; 114 (45.5 overs)	v	Bangladesh; 115/3 (41.2 overs)
P Banerji Nair 34; Daulat Zaman 4/23 (9 Overs)		Jahangir Shah 39*; S Marimuthu 1/15 (10 Overs)

Bangladesh won by 7 wickets
Gorway Ground, Walsall
Umpires: Unknown

- Toss unknown
- Reserve day used

May 31 – June 1, 1979
Scorecard

Denmark; 118 (57.0 overs)	v	Canada; 72 (32.4 overs)
Henrik Mortensen 36; Martin Stead 4/16 (9 Overs)		John Vaughan 16; Carsten Morild 4/16 (12 Overs)

Denmark won by 46 runs
Knowle and Dorridge Cricket Club Ground, Knowle
Umpires: Unknown

- Toss unknown
- Reserve day used

June 4, 1979
Scorecard

Denmark; 165/8 (60.0 overs)	v	Bangladesh; 155 (58.5 overs)
Keld Kristensen 74; Daulat Zaman 2/42 (12 Overs)		Ashraful Haq 31; Torben Nielsen 3/16 (12 Overs)

Denmark won by 10 runs
Kings Heath Cricket Club Ground, Kings Heath
Umpires: Unknown

- Toss unknown

June 4, 1979
Scorecard

Canada; 209/6 (60.0 overs)	v	Fiji; 153 (53.5 overs)
John Vaughan 68*; Frederick Valentine 2/34 (12 Overs)		CAC Browne 34; Jitendra Patel 3/22 (12 Overs)

Canada won by 56 runs
Solihull Cricket Club Ground, Solihull
Umpires: Unknown

- Toss unknown

=== Group C ===
==== Points table ====
Pos	Team	Pld	W	L	Ab	NR	Pts	RR	Qualification
1	Sri Lanka	4	2	1	1	0	10	1.028	Advanced to Semi-finals as group winner
2	Wales	4	2	1	1	0	10	0.653	
3	United States	4	2	1	1	0	10	−0.042	
4	Netherlands	4	1	2	1	0	6	0.119	
5	Israel	4	1	3	0	0	4	−1.219	

Source: ESPNcricinfo

==== Fixtures ====
May 22, 1979
Scorecard

United States; 126 (49.1 overs)	v	Israel; 85 (46.0 overs)
Neil Lashkari 44; Reuben Reuben 4/37 (11.1 Overs)		Barry Kanpol 24*; Stephen Jones 3/16 (12 Overs)

United States won by 41 runs
Blossomfield Cricket Club, Blossomfield
Umpires: AJ Inman (Eng), L. Burton (Eng)

- Toss unknown

22–23 May 1979
Scorecard

Wales; 170/7 (60.0 overs)	v	Netherlands; 59/2 (30.0 overs)
Jeffris Hopkins 71; Peter van Wel 2/11 (9 Overs)		Chris van Schouwenburg; Nigel Owen 2/20 (12 Overs)

Wales won by 26 runs (revised target)
Enville
Umpires: DB Jones (ENG) & DA Duckers (ENG)

- Toss unknown
- Reserve day used

May 24, 1979
Scorecard

Israel; 105 (51.5 overs)	v	Netherlands; 107/2 (32.1 overs)
David Moss 39; Rob van Weelde 3/12 (8 Overs)		A Bakker 60*; Barry Kanpol 2/14 (8 Overs)

Netherlands won by 8 wickets
Banbury XX Cricket Club, Banbury
Umpires: K Turner (ENG) & GA Brown (ENG)

- Toss unknown

May 24, 1979
Scorecard

United States; 168 (56.3 overs)	v	Sri Lanka; 170/4 (40.0 overs)
Wayne Stuger 48; Sridharan Jeganathan 2/30 (12 overs)		Roy Dias 76; WG Bovell 2/30 (6 over)

Sri Lanka won by 6 wickets
Saints Ground, Northampton
Umpires: PG Berry (ENG) & PG Bell (ENG)

- Toss unknown

May 29–30, 1979
Scorecard

Sri Lanka	v	Wales

Match abandoned without a ball bowled
Leicester Road, Hinckley
Umpires: Unknown

- Reserve day used

May 29–30, 1979
Scorecard

Netherlands	v	United States

Match abandoned without a ball bowled
Leamington Cricket Club Ground, Leamington Spa
Umpires: Unknown

June 1, 1979
Scorecard

Wales; 234/5 (60.0 overs)	v	Israel; 143/9 (60.0 overs)
Jeffris Hopkins 92; Nissam Reube 2/38 (12 overs)		Jerrold Kessel 32; Alan Geoghegan 3/23 (12 overs)

Wales won by 91 runs
Astwood Bank Cricket Club Ground, Redditch
Umpires: Unknown

- Toss unknown
- Reserve day used

June 1st, 1979
Scorecard

Sri Lanka; 212/8 (60.0 overs)	v	Netherlands; 167/8 (60.0 overs)
Duleep Mendis 51; Rob van Weelde 3/22 (12 overs)		A Bakker 74; Bandula Warnapura 2/21 (12 overs)

Sri Lanka won by 45 runs
Scorers, Shirley
Umpires: BJ Turner (ENG) & TJ Cox (ENG)

- Toss unknown
- Reserve day used

June 4, 1979
Scorecard

United States; 190 (54.3 overs)	v	Wales; 182 (58.5 overs)
Anil Lashkari 73; Stuart Carey 3/18 (8 overs)		Geoff Ellis; Kamaran Rasheed 5/17 (8 overs)

United States won by 8 runs
Olton and West Warwickshire Cricket Club, Solihull
Umpires: S Grainger (ENG) & WP Judd (ENG)

- Toss unknown

June 4, 1979
Scorecard

Israel	v	Sri Lanka

Israel won by a walkover
Kenilworth Cricket Club Ground, Warwick Road
Umpires: N/A

- Sri Lanka refused on political grounds to play against Israel

== Knockout Stage ==
=== Semi-finals ===
June 6, 1979
Scorecard

Sri Lanka; 318/8 (60 overs)	v	Denmark; 110 (42.5 over)
Roy Dias 88; Henrik Mortensen 2/54 (12 Overs)		Keld Kristensen 34; Sudath Pasqual 3/7 (6.5 overs)

Sri Lanka won by 208 runs
Allied Breweries Ground, Burton-on-Trent
Umpires: Unknown

- Toss unknown

June 6, 1979
Scorecard

Bermuda; 181 (58.1 overs)	v	Canada; 186/6 (57.5 overs)
John Tucker 49; Cornelius Henry 2/17 (5.1 Overs)		Bryan Mauricette 72; Winston Trott 2/14 (12 overs)

Canada won by 4 wickets
Mitchells and Butlers' Ground, Birmingham
Umpires: PG Berry (ENG) & GA Wenman (ENG)

- Toss unknown

=== Final ===
June 21, 1979
Scorecard

Sri Lanka; 324/8 (60 overs)	v	Canada; 264/5 (60 overs)
Duleep Mendis 66; Glenroy Sealy 2/49 (12 Overs)		John Vaughan 80*; Somachandra de Silva 1/42 (12 overs)

Sri Lanka won by 60 runs
New Road, Worcester
Umpires: Sam Hale (ENG) & FJ Law (ENG)

- Toss unknown

== Statistics ==
=== Most runs ===
The top five run scorers (total runs) are included in this table.

Player	Team	Runs	Inns	Avg	Highest	100s	50s
Duleep Mendis	Sri Lanka	221	4	55.25	68	0	3
Roy Dias	Sri Lanka	214	4	71.33	88	0	2
John Vaughan	Canada	211	6	70.33	80*	0	2
Henrik Mortensen	Denmark	196	5	98.00	55*	0	2
Franklyn Dennis	Canada	172	6	28.66	61	0	1

Source: CricketArchive

=== Most wickets ===
The top five wicket takers are listed in this table, listed by wickets taken and then by bowling average.

Player	Team	Overs	Wkts	Ave	SR	Econ	Best
John Vaughan	Canada	67.5	14	16.21	29.07	3.34	4/33
Winston Trott	Bermuda	47.0	10	8.00	28.20	1.70	3/8
Lawrence Young Ken Sen	Singapore	31.1	10	10.10	18.70	3.24	5/44
Ashraful Haque	Bangladesh	36.2	10	10.70	21.80	2.94	7/23
Ole Mortensen	Denmark	56.4	10	12.90	34.00	2.27	4/15

Source: CricketArchive
