= Colin Blades =

West Indian cricketer

Personal information
- Full name: Colin Francis Blades
- Born: 13 August 1944 (age 82); Saint Philip Parish, Barbados
- Batting: Right-handed
- Bowling: Right-arm medium
- Role: All-rounder

International information
- National side: Bermuda (1975–1982)

Domestic team information
- Years: Team
- 1964–1970: Barbados
- Source: CricketArchive, 2 February 2016

Colin Francis Blades (born 13 August 1944) is a former West Indian cricketer who played both for Barbados in West Indian domestic cricket and for Bermuda internationally. He captained Bermuda at the 1982 ICC Trophy, where he was also the overall leading run-scorer.

Blades was born in Saint Philip Parish, Barbados. He made his first-class debut in February 1964, playing for Barbados against British Guiana. After his debut, Blades did not feature for Barbados again until the 1968–69 Shell Shield season, when he played in all four of his team's matches. Against Jamaica, he made what was to be his highest first-class score, 75 runs from third in the batting order (including ten fours and a six). During the 1969 English season, Blades appeared twice for Nottinghamshire in the Second XI Championship. Later in the season, he also played in several exhibition games for the International Cavaliers (including against the touring New Zealanders). He eventually joined up with the Barbadian squad that was on its own tour of England, playing two first-class matches (against Nottinghamshire and the Cavaliers) and a one-day fixture (against Essex).

Having played his last games for Barbados during the 1969–70 season, Blades moved to Bermuda in the early 1970s. He is first recorded as playing for the Bermudian national side in 1975, when he represented the team against Jamaica. In 1979, Blades was selected for Bermuda in the inaugural edition of the ICC Trophy. He was one of six members of the squad with first-class experience, the others being Joseph Bailey, Noel Gibbons, Clarence Parfitt, Lionel Thomas, and Winston Trott. His biggest contribution at the tournament was as a bowler, with his best performances being 1/3 from 12 overs against Argentina and 2/14 from 12 overs in the semi-final against Canada. For the 1982 ICC Trophy, Blades was named Bermuda's captain, aged 37. He finished the tournament as the overall leading run-scorer, making 310 runs from eight matches (including innings of 69 not out against Papua New Guinea and 82 not out against West Africa). Bermuda made the tournament's final for the first and only time, but lost to Zimbabwe, narrowly missing out on qualifying for the 1983 World Cup.
