= Mir Belayet Hossain =

Bangladeshi cricketer (1955–2025)

Mir Belayet Hossain Belal

Personal information
- Full name: Mir Belayet Hossain Belal
- Born: 1 July 1955; Mymensingh, East Bengal, Pakistan
- Died: 23 July 2025 (aged 70); Mymensingh, Bangladesh
- Batting: Right-handed
- Role: Wicket-keeper batsman

International information
- National side: Bangladesh (1977–1984)

Domestic team information
- Years: Team
- Abahani Krira Chakra
- Kalabagan
- Rupali Bank
- Agrani Bank
- Dhanmondi Club
- Mymensingh Sports Council
- Source: ESPNcricinfo, 24 July 2025

Mir Belayet Hossain Belal (Bengali: মীর বেলায়েত হোসেন বেলাল; 1 July 1955 – 23 July 2025) was a Bangladeshi wicket-keeper. A right-handed batsman, he played for the national cricket team. Hossain was born in Mymensingh. From an early age, he was interested in sports and showed his cricket skills in school and college competitions. In the 1980s, he became known in domestic cricket for his bold batting style.

== Playing career ==
=== International ===
During the 1979 ICC Trophy, Belayet Hossain played three matches for Bangladesh. He scored 19 runs against Canada, remained not out with 13 runs against Malaysia, and added 10 runs against Denmark. His contributions as a lower-order batsman and as a wicket-keeper were valuable for the team during the early years of Bangladesh's international cricket.

1979 ICC Trophy performances
Match	Runs scored	Date	Ground	Tournament format
Bangladesh vs Denmark	10	4 June 1979	Birmingham	ICCTROPHY #23
Bangladesh vs Malaysia	13*	31 May 1979	Walsall	ICCTROPHY #17
Bangladesh vs Canada	19	29 May 1979	Lichfield	ICCTROPHY #14

=== National team ===
Hossain represented the Bangladesh national team from 1977 to 1984. He was a member of the 1979 ICC Trophy squad. His skill behind the stumps and his brave performances with the bat established him as an important player for the team.

=== Club and domestic cricket ===
In Dhaka's club cricket, Hossain played for Abahani, Kalabagan, Rupali Bank, Agrani Bank, and Dhanmondi Club. He also represented the Mymensingh District in the National Cricket Championship. His hard-hitting batting and lively presence behind the stumps made him stand out in club cricket.

=== Retirement ===
After his playing days, his involvement with cricket did not end. He served as a match referee in 79 first-class matches, 81 List 'A' matches, and one T20 match. He also worked as a regional development manager for the BCB.

== Death ==
On 23 July 2025, Hossain died in Mymensingh, at the age of 70. The Bangladesh Cricket Board (BCB) and the Bangladesh Cricket Umpires and Scorers Association expressed their condolences.
