= International cricket in 1985–86 =

International cricket season

The 1985–86 international cricket season was from September 1985 to April 1986.

== Season overview ==
International tours
Start date	Home team	Away team	Results [Matches]			
Start date	Home team	Away team	Test	ODI	FC	LA
13 October 1985	Pakistan	Sri Lanka	2–0 [3]	4–0 [4]	—	—
8 November 1985	Australia	New Zealand	1–2 [3]	—	—	—
27 November 1985	Pakistan	West Indies	—	2–3 [5]	—	—
13 December 1985	Australia	India	0–0 [3]	—	—	—
18 February 1986	West Indies	England	5–0 [5]	3–1 [4]	—	—
21 February 1986	New Zealand	Australia	1–0 [3]	2–2 [4]	—	—
23 February 1986	Sri Lanka	Pakistan	1–1 [3]	0–2 [3]	—	—
International tournaments
Start date	Tournament				Winners	
15 November 1985	(United Arab Emirates) 1985 Rothmans Sharjah Cup				West Indies	
9 January 1986	(Australia) 1985–86 Benson & Hedges World Series				Australia	
30 March 1986	(Sri Lanka) 1986 Asia Cup				Sri Lanka	
5 April 1986	(Sri Lanka) 1986 John Player Triangular Tournament				Pakistan	
10 April 1986	(United Arab Emirates) 1986 Austral-Asia Cup				Pakistan	

== October ==
=== Sri Lanka in Pakistan ===
Test Series
No.	Date	Home captain 1	Away captain 2	Venue	Result
Test 1026	16–21 October	Javed Miandad	Duleep Mendis	Iqbal Stadium, Faisalabad	Match drawn
Test 1027	27–31 October	Javed Miandad	Duleep Mendis	Jinnah Stadium, Sialkot	Pakistan by 8 wickets
Test 1028	7–11 December	Javed Miandad	Duleep Mendis	National Stadium, Karachi	Pakistan by 10 wickets
ODI series
ODI 335	13 October	Javed Miandad	Duleep Mendis	Arbab Niaz Stadium, Peshawar	Pakistan by 8 wickets
ODI 336	23 October	Javed Miandad	Duleep Mendis	Jinnah Stadium, Gujranwala	Pakistan by 15 wickets
ODI 337	25 October	Javed Miandad	Duleep Mendis	Gaddafi Stadium, Lahore	Pakistan by 5 wickets
ODI 338	3 November	Javed Miandad	Duleep Mendis	Niaz Stadium, Hyderabad (Sindh)	Pakistan by 89 runs

== November ==
=== New Zealand in Australia ===
Test series
No.	Date	Home captain	Away captain	Venue	Result
Test 1029	8–12 November	Allan Border	Jeremy Coney	Brisbane Cricket Ground, Brisbane	New Zealand by an innings and 41 runs
Test 1030	22–26 November	Allan Border	Jeremy Coney	Sydney Cricket Ground, Sydney	Australia by 4 wickets
Test 1031	30 November–4 December	Allan Border	Jeremy Coney	WACA Ground, Perth	New Zealand by 6 wickets

=== 1985–86 Sharjah Cup ===
Team	P	W	L	T	NR	RR	Points
West Indies	2	2	0	0	0	4.494	4
Pakistan	2	1	1	0	0	4.433	2
India	2	0	2	0	0	3.911	0

ODI Series
No.	Date	Team 1	Captain 1	Team 2	Captain 2	Venue	Result
ODI 339	15 November	Pakistan	Imran Khan	West Indies	Viv Richards	Sharjah Cricket Stadium, Sharjah	West Indies by 7 wickets
ODI 340	17 November	India	Kapil Dev	Pakistan	Imran Khan	Sharjah Cricket Stadium, Sharjah	Pakistan by 48 runs
ODI 341	22 November	India	Kapil Dev	West Indies	Viv Richards	Sharjah Cricket Stadium, Sharjah	West Indies by 8 wickets

=== West Indies in Pakistan ===
ODI Series
No.	Date	Home captain 1	Away captain 2	Venue	Result
ODI 342	27 November	Imran Khan	Viv Richards	Jinnah Stadium, Gujranwala	West Indies by 8 wickets
ODI 343	29 November	Imran Khan	Viv Richards	Gaddafi Stadium, Lahore	Pakistan by 6 wickets
ODI 344	2 December	Imran Khan	Viv Richards	Arbab Niaz Stadium, Peshawar	West Indies by 40 runs
ODI 345	4 December	Imran Khan	Viv Richards	Pindi Club Ground, Rawalpindi	Pakistan by 4 wickets
ODI 346	6 December	Imran Khan	Viv Richards	National Stadium, Karachi	West Indies by 8 wickets

== December ==
=== India in Australia ===
Test series
No.	Date	Home captain	Away captain	Venue	Result
Test 1032	13–17 December	Allan Border	Kapil Dev	Adelaide Oval, Adelaide	Match drawn
Test 1033	26–30 December	Allan Border	Kapil Dev	Melbourne Cricket Ground, Melbourne	Match drawn
Test 1034	2–6 January	Allan Border	Kapil Dev	Sydney Cricket Ground, Sydney	Match drawn

== January ==
=== 1985–86 Benson & Hedges World Series ===
Group stage
No.	Date	Team 1	Captain 1	Team 2	Captain 2	Venue	Result
ODI 347	9 January	Australia	Allan Border	New Zealand	Jeremy Coney	Melbourne Cricket Ground, Melbourne	No result
ODI 348	11 January	India	Kapil Dev	New Zealand	Jeremy Coney	Brisbane Cricket Ground, Brisbane	India by 5 wickets
ODI 349	12 January	Australia	Allan Border	India	Kapil Dev	Brisbane Cricket Ground, Brisbane	Australia by 4 wickets
ODI 350	14 January	Australia	Allan Border	New Zealand	Jeremy Coney	Sydney Cricket Ground, Sydney	Australia by 4 wickets
ODI 351	16 January	Australia	Allan Border	India	Kapil Dev	Melbourne Cricket Ground, Melbourne	India by 8 wickets
ODI 352	18 January	India	Kapil Dev	New Zealand	Jeremy Coney	WACA Ground, Perth	New Zealand by 3 wickets
ODI 353	19 January	Australia	Allan Border	New Zealand	Jeremy Coney	WACA Ground, Perth	Australia by 4 wickets
ODI 354	21 January	Australia	Allan Border	India	Kapil Dev	Sydney Cricket Ground, Sydney	Australia by 100 runs
ODI 355	23 January	India	Kapil Dev	New Zealand	Jeremy Coney	Melbourne Cricket Ground, Melbourne	New Zealand by 5 wickets
ODI 356	25 January	India	Kapil Dev	New Zealand	Jeremy Coney	Adelaide Oval, Adelaide	India by 5 wickets
ODI 357	26 January	Australia	Allan Border	India	Kapil Dev	Adelaide Oval, Adelaide	Australia by 36 runs
ODI 358	27 January	Australia	Allan Border	New Zealand	Jeremy Coney	Adelaide Oval, Adelaide	New Zealand by 206 runs
ODI 359	29 January	Australia	Allan Border	New Zealand	Jeremy Coney	Sydney Cricket Ground, Sydney	Australia by 99 runs
ODI 360	31 January	Australia	Allan Border	India	Kapil Dev	Melbourne Cricket Ground, Melbourne	India by 6 wickets
ODI 361	2 February	India	Kapil Dev	New Zealand	Jeremy Coney	North Tasmania Cricket Association Ground, Launceston	India by 22 runs
Final
ODI 362	5 February	Australia	Allan Border	India	Kapil Dev	Sydney Cricket Ground, Sydney	Australia by 11 runs
ODI 363	9 February	Australia	Allan Border	India	Kapil Dev	Melbourne Cricket Ground, Melbourne	Australia by 7 wickets

== February ==
=== England in West Indies ===
Test Series
No.	Date	Home captain 1	Away captain 2	Venue	Result
Test 1036	21–23 February	Viv Richards	David Gower	Sabina Park, Kingston	West Indies by 10 wickets
Test 1039	7–12 March	Viv Richards	David Gower	Queen's Park Oval, Port of Spain	West Indies by 7 wickets
Test 1042	21–25 March	Viv Richards	David Gower	Kensington Oval, Bridgetown	West Indies by an innings and 30 runs
Test 1044	3–5 March	Viv Richards	David Gower	Queen's Park Oval, Port of Spain	West Indies by 10 wickets
Test 1045	11–16 April	Viv Richards	David Gower	Antigua Recreation Ground, St. John's	West Indies by 240 runs
ODI series
ODI 364	18 February	Viv Richards	David Gower	Sabina Park, Kingston	West Indies by 6 wickets
ODI 366	4 March	Viv Richards	David Gower	Queen's Park Oval, Port of Spain	England by 5 wickets
ODI 370	19 March	Viv Richards	David Gower	Kensington Oval, Bridgetown	West Indies by 135 runs
ODI 376	31 March	Viv Richards	David Gower	Queen's Park Oval, Port of Spain	West Indies by 8 wickets

=== Australia in New Zealand ===
Test Series
No.	Date	Home captain 1	Away captain 2	Venue	Result
Test 1035	21–25 February	Jeremy Coney	Allan Border	Basin Reserve, Wellington	Match drawn
Test 1038	28 February–4 March	Jeremy Coney	Allan Border	AMI Stadium, Christchurch	Match drawn
Test 1040	13–17 March	Jeremy Coney	Allan Border	Eden Park, Auckland	New Zealand by 8 wickets
ODI series
ODI 369	19 March	Jeremy Coney	Allan Border	Carisbrook, Dunedin	New Zealand by 30 runs
ODI 371	22 March	Jeremy Coney	Allan Border	AMI Stadium, Christchurch	New Zealand by 53 runs
ODI 372	26 March	Jeremy Coney	Allan Border	Basin Reserve, Wellington	Australia by 3 wickets
ODI 373	29 March	Jeremy Coney	Allan Border	Eden Park, Auckland	Australia by 44 runs

=== Pakistan in Sri Lanka ===
Test Series
No.	Date	Home captain 1	Away captain 2	Venue	Result
Test 1037	23–27 February	Duleep Mendis	Imran Khan	Asgiriya Stadium, Kandy	Pakistan by an innings and 20 runs
Test 1041	14–18 March	Duleep Mendis	Imran Khan	Colombo Cricket Club, Colombo	Sri Lanka by 8 wickets
Test 1043	22–27 March	Duleep Mendis	Imran Khan	P Sara Oval, Colombo	Match drawn
ODI series
ODI 365	2 March	Duleep Mendis	Imran Khan	Asgiriya Stadium, Kandy	Pakistan by 8 wickets
ODI 367	8 March	Duleep Mendis	Imran Khan	Tyronne Fernando Stadium, Moratuwa	No result
ODI 367a	9 March	Duleep Mendis	Imran Khan	R.Premadasa Stadium, Colombo	Match abandoned
ODI 368	11 March	Duleep Mendis	Imran Khan	Sinhalese Sports Club, Colombo	Pakistan by 8 wickets

== March ==
=== 1986 Asia Cup ===
Team	Pld	W	L	T	NR	Pts	RR
Pakistan	2	2	0	0	0	4	3.823
Sri Lanka	2	1	1	0	0	2	3.796
Bangladesh	2	0	2	0	0	0	2.795

Group stage
No.	Date	Team 1	Captain 1	Team 2	Captain 2	Venue	Result
ODI 374	30 March	Sri Lanka	Duleep Mendis	Pakistan	Imran Khan	P Sara Oval, Colombo	Pakistan by 81 runs
ODI 375	31 March	Bangladesh	Gazi Ashraf	Pakistan	Imran Khan	Tyronne Fernando Stadium, Moratuwa	Pakistan by 7 wickets
ODI 377	2 April	Sri Lanka	Duleep Mendis	Bangladesh	Gazi Ashraf	Asgiriya Stadium, Kandy	Sri Lanka by 7 wickets
Final
ODI 379	6 April	Sri Lanka	Duleep Mendis	Pakistan	Imran Khan	Sinhalese Sports Club, Colombo	Sri Lanka by 5 wickets

== April ==
=== 1986 John Player Triangular Tournament ===
Team	P	W	L	T	NR	RR	Points
Pakistan	2	1	1	0	0	4.763	2
New Zealand	2	1	1	0	0	4.519	2
Sri Lanka	2	1	1	0	0	3.891	2

ODI Series
No.	Date	Team 1	Captain 1	Team 2	Captain 2	Venue	Result
ODI 378	5 April	Sri Lanka	Duleep Mendis	New Zealand	John Wright	R.Premadasa Stadium, Colombo	New Zealand by 6 wickets
ODI 379	6 April	Sri Lanka	Duleep Mendis	Pakistan	Imran Khan	Sinhalese Sports Club, Colombo	Sri Lanka by 5 wickets
ODI 380	7 April	New Zealand	John Wright	Pakistan	Javed Miandad	Sinhalese Sports Club, Colombo	Pakistan by 4 wickets

=== 1986 Austral-Asia Cup ===
First round
No.	Date	Team 1	Captain 1	Team 2	Captain 2	Venue	Result
ODI 381	10 April	India	Kapil Dev	New Zealand	Jeff Crowe	Sharjah Cricket Stadium, Sharjah	India by 3 wickets
ODI 382	11 April	Australia	Ray Bright	Pakistan	Javed Miandad	Sharjah Cricket Stadium, Sharjah	Pakistan by 8 wickets
Semi-finals
ODI 383	13 April	India	Kapil Dev	Sri Lanka	Duleep Mendis	Sharjah Cricket Stadium, Sharjah	India by 3 wickets
ODI 384	15 April	New Zealand	Jeff Crowe	Pakistan	Imran Khan	Sharjah Cricket Stadium, Sharjah	Pakistan by 10 wickets
Final
ODI 385	18 April	India	Kapil Dev	Pakistan	Imran Khan	Sharjah Cricket Stadium, Sharjah	Pakistan by 1 wicket
