= 1989–90 Norwich City F.C. season =

Norwich City
1989–90 season
- Chairman: Robert Chase
- Manager: Dave Stringer
- Stadium: Carrow Road
- First Division: 10th
- FA Cup: Fourth round
- League Cup: Third round
- Full Members Cup: Quarter-final
- Player of the Year: Mark Bowen
- Top goalscorer: League: Robert Fleck/Mark Bowen (7); All: Robert Fleck (12)
- Highest home attendance: 20,210 v Liverpool
- Lowest home attendance: 12,640 v Crystal Palace
- Average home league attendance: 16,737
| Home colours | Away colours |

For the 1989–90 season, Norwich City F.C. competed in Football League Division One, as well as the FA Cup, League Cup and Full Members' Cup.

== Overview ==
The previous season had been Norwich City's most successful to that point, with the club finishing fourth in Division One and reaching the semi-finals of the FA Cup, so they might have been expected to be in competition to win one or more trophies. This, however, was not to be the case. While Norwich never looked in danger of being relegated from the top flight, they would finish mid-table and be eliminated early from all three cup competitions.

Although they defeated Brighton & Hove Albion 5–0 in the Full Members' Cup, they would not win a league game by more than 2–0, which they achieved eight times. Their heaviest defeat was 4–0 away at Tottenham. The highest scoring game was a 4–4 home draw with Southampton.

== Squad ==
Squad at end of season (5 May 1990)

Note: Flags indicate national team as defined under FIFA eligibility rules; some limited exceptions apply. Players may hold more than one non-FIFA nationality.

| Pos. | Nation | Player |
|---|---|---|
| GK | SCO | Bryan Gunn |
| GK | WAL | Mark Walton |
| GK | ENG | Jon Sheffield |
| DF | ENG | Ian Culverhouse (3rd captain) |
| DF | WAL | Mark Bowen |
| DF | ENG | Ian Butterworth (captain) |
| DF | ENG | Andy Linighan |
| DF | ENG | Adrian Pennock |
| DF | ENG | Andy Theodosiou |
| MF | IRL | Andy Townsend (vice-captain) |
| MF | ENG | Dale Gordon |
| MF | ENG | Ian Crook |
| MF | WAL | David Phillips |

| Pos. | Nation | Player |
|---|---|---|
| MF | ENG | Tim Sherwood |
| MF | ENG | Jeremy Goss |
| MF | ENG | Ruel Fox |
| MF | DEN | Henrik Mortensen |
| MF | ENG | David Smith |
| MF | ENG | Jason Minett |
| MF | ENG | Daryl Sutch |
| MF | ENG | Robert Taylor |
| FW | SCO | Robert Fleck |
| FW | ENG | Robert Rosario |
| FW | ENG | Dean Coney |
| FW | IRL | Lee Power |

== Transfers ==
=== In ===
| Date | Pos | Name | From | Fee | Reference |
|---|---|---|---|---|---|
| 4 July 1989 | DF | Andy Theodosiou | Tottenham Hotspur | Free | |
| 18 July 1989 | MF | Tim Sherwood | Watford | £175,000 | |
| 31 July 1989 | MF | David Phillips | Coventry City | £550,000 | |
| 15 August 1989 | GK | Mark Walton | Colchester United | £75,000 | |
| 2 October 1989 | MF | Henrik Mortensen | Aarhus | £400,000 | |

=== Out ===
| Date | Pos | Name | To | Fee | Reference |
|---|---|---|---|---|---|
| 8 June 1989 | MF | Mike Phelan | Manchester United | £750,000 | |
| 14 August 1989 | MF | Trevor Putney | Middlesbrough | £300,000 | |
| 18 August 1989 | FW | Alan Reeves | Chester City | £10,000 | |
| 1 November 1989 | MF | Paul Cook | Wolverhampton Wanderers | £250,000 | |
| 4 December 1989 | MF | Mike Flynn | Preston North End | £125,000 | |
| 20 March 1990 | FW | Malcolm Allen | Millwall | £400,000 | |

=== Loans in ===
| Date | Pos | Name | From | Until | Reference |
|---|---|---|---|---|---|
| 1 March 1990 | DF | Nicky Tanner | Liverpool | 31 March 1990 | |

=== Loans out ===
| Date | Pos | Name | To | Until | Reference |
|---|---|---|---|---|---|
| 22 September 1989 | GK | Jon Sheffield | Aldershot | 11 November 1989 | |
| 21 March 1990 | GK | Jon Sheffield | Ipswich Town | End of season | |

== Final table ==
| Pos | Team | Pld | W | D | L | GF | GA | GD | Pts |
|---|---|---|---|---|---|---|---|---|---|
| 8 | Wimbledon | 38 | 13 | 16 | 9 | 47 | 40 | +7 | 55 |
| 9 | Nottingham Forest | 38 | 15 | 9 | 14 | 55 | 47 | +8 | 54 |
| 10 | Norwich City | 38 | 13 | 14 | 11 | 44 | 42 | +2 | 53 |
| 11 | Queens Park Rangers | 38 | 13 | 11 | 14 | 45 | 44 | +1 | 50 |
| 12 | Coventry City | 38 | 14 | 7 | 17 | 39 | 59 | −20 | 49 |

Rules for classification: 1) Points; 2) Goal difference; 3) Goals scored

== Results ==
=== Division One ===
| 19 August 1989 1 | Sheffield Wednesday | 0–2 | Norwich City | Sheffield |
| | | Report | Phillips 3'; Fleck 71' | Stadium: Hillsborough; Attendance: 19,142; Referee: A. Buksh |

| 23 August 1989 2 | Norwich City | 1–1 | Nottingham Forest | Norwich |
| | Gordon 27' | Report | Chapman 67' | Stadium: Carrow Road; Attendance: 18,267; Referee: D. Vickers |

| 26 August 1989 3 | Norwich City | 0–0 | Queens Park Rangers | Norwich |
| | | Report | | Stadium: Carrow Road; Attendance: 14,021; Referee: K. Barratt |

| 30 August 1989 4 | Manchester United | 0–2 | Norwich City | Manchester |
| | | Report | Gordon 44'; Fleck 76' (pen.) | Stadium: Old Trafford; Attendance: 39,610; Referee: K.A. Cooper |

| 9 September 1989 5 | Norwich City | 4–4 | Southampton | Norwich |
| | Rosario 27' 84'; Sherwood 48'; Fleck 77' | Report | Rideout 7' 50'; Wallace 39' 47' | Stadium: Carrow Road; Attendance: 14,259; Referee: T. Ward |

| 16 September 1989 6 | Liverpool | 0–0 | Norwich City | Liverpool |
| | | Report | | Stadium: Anfield; Attendance: 36,885; Referee: R. Milford |

| 23 September 1989 7 | Norwich City | 2–2 | Tottenham Hotspur | Norwich |
| | Phillips 48'; Bowen 57' | Report | Gascoigne 20'; Lineker 34' | Stadium: Carrow Road; Attendance: 20,095; Referee: V. Callow |

| 30 September 1989 8 | Millwall | 0–1 | Norwich City | London |
| | | Report | Bowen 60' | Stadium: The Den; Attendance: 13,295; Referee: L. Shapter |

| 14 October 1989 9 | Norwich City | 2–0 | Chelsea | Norwich |
| | Bowen 14'; Fleck 50' (pen.) | Report | | Stadium: Carrow Road; Attendance: 19,042; Referee: T. Simpson |

| 21 October 1989 10 | Luton Town | 4–1 | Norwich City | Luton |
| | Black 4'; Dreyer 54'; Wilson 65'; Williams 76' | Report | Allen 83' (pen.) | Stadium: Kenilworth Road; Attendance: 9,038; Referee: B. Stevens/Coaten |

| 28 October 1989 11 | Norwich City | 1–1 | Everton | Norwich |
| | Linighan 45' | Report | Cottee 67' | Stadium: Carrow Road; Attendance: 18,637; Referee: D. Hedges |

| 4 November 1989 12 | Arsenal | 4–3 | Norwich City | London |
| | Quinn 55'; Dixon 60' (pen.) 90'; O'Leary 78' | Report | Allen 19'; Phillips 30'; Sherwood 76' | Stadium: Highbury; Attendance: 35,338; Referee: G. Tyson |

| 11 November 1989 13 | Norwich City | 2–0 | Aston Villa | Norwich |
| | Mountfield 46' (o.g.); Linighan 68' | Report | | Stadium: Carrow Road; Attendance: 18,186; Referee: H. King |

| 18 November 1989 14 | Norwich City | 0–0 | Charlton Athletic | Norwich |
| | | Report | | Stadium: Carrow Road; Attendance: 16,064; Referee: K. Barratt |

| 25 November 1989 15 | Coventry City | 1–0 | Norwich City | Coventry |
| | Regis 85' | Report | | Stadium: Highfield Road; Attendance: 11,999; Referee: R. Dilkes |

| 2 December 1989 16 | Norwich City | 2–1 | Sheffield Wednesday | Norwich |
| | Townsend 22' (pen.); King 42' (o.g.) | Report | Hirst 14' | Stadium: Carrow Road; Attendance: 15,341; Referee: R. Lewis |

| 9 December 1989 17 | Nottingham Forest | 0–1 | Norwich City | Nottingham |
| | | Report | Bowen 44' | Stadium: City Ground; Attendance: 18,939; Referee: R. Dilkes |

| 16 December 1989 18 | Norwich City | 1–0 | Derby County | Norwich |
| | Rosario 16' | Report | | Stadium: Carrow Road; Attendance: 16,184; Referee: M. Bailey |

| 26 December 1989 19 | Manchester City | 1–0 | Norwich City | Manchester |
| | Allen 86' | Report | | Stadium: Maine Road; Attendance: 29,534; Referee: M. Reed |

| 30 December 1989 20 | Crystal Palace | 1–0 | Norwich City | London |
| | Wright 58' | Report | | Stadium: Selhurst Park; Attendance: 14,250; Referee: R. Groves |

| 1 January 1990 21 | Norwich City | 0–1 | Wimbledon | Norwich |
| | | Report | Gibson 90' | Stadium: Carrow Road; Attendance: 16,680; Referee: D. Phillips |

| 13 January 1990 22 | Queens Park Rangers | 2–1 | Norwich City | London |
| | Falco 49'; Clarke 83' | Report | Gordon 70' | Stadium: Loftus Road; Attendance: 11,439; Referee: G. Courtney |

| 21 January 1990 23 | Norwich City | 2–0 | Manchester United | Norwich |
| | Fleck 70' 85' | Report | | Stadium: Carrow Road; Attendance: 17,370; Referee: T. Holbrook |

| 4 February 1990 24 | Tottenham Hotspur | 4–0 | Norwich City | London |
| | Lineker 24' 47' 63' (pen.); Howells 44' | Report | | Stadium: White Hart Lane; Attendance: 19,599; Referee: J.Martin |

| 10 February 1990 25 | Norwich City | 0–0 | Liverpool | Norwich |
| | | Report | Hysen (red card) 51' | Stadium: Carrow Road; Attendance: 20,210; Referee: L. Shapter |

| 27 February 1990 26 | Southampton | 4–1 | Norwich City | Southampton |
| | Le Tissier 55' 62' 87'; Moore 82' | Report | Allen 18' | Stadium: The Dell; Attendance: 13,688; Referee: R. Hamer |

| 3 March 1990 27 | Charlton Athletic | 0–1 | Norwich City | London |
| | | Report | Fleck 25' | Stadium: Selhurst Park; Attendance: 7,918; Referee: P. Foulkes |

| 10 March 1990 28 | Chelsea | 0–0 | Norwich City | London |
| | | Report | | Stadium: Stamford Bridge; Attendance: 18,796; Referee: N. Midgley |

| 14 March 1990 29 | Norwich City | 0–0 | Coventry City | Norwich |
| | | Report | | Stadium: Carrow Road; Attendance: 13,673; Referee: J. Moules |

| 17 March 1990 30 | Norwich City | 1–1 | Millwall | Norwich |
| | Townsend 79'; Fleck (red card) | Report | Sheringham 59'; Wood (red card) | Stadium: Carrow Road; Attendance: 14,599; Referee: J. Kirkby |

| 24 March 1990 31 | Everton | 3–1 | Norwich City | Liverpool |
| | Cottee 47' 60'; Sharp 85' | Report | Phillips 58' | Stadium: Goodison Park; Attendance: 21,707; Referee: R. Hart |

| 31 March 1990 32 | Norwich City | 2–0 | Luton Town | Norwich |
| | Townsend 27' (pen.); Bowen 48' | Report | | Stadium: Carrow Road; Attendance: 14,451; Referee: D. Hedges |

| 4 April 1990 33 | Norwich City | 2–0 | Crystal Palace | Norwich |
| | Sherwood 14'; O'Reilly 37' (o.g.) | Report | | Stadium: Carrow Road; Attendance: 12,640; Referee: P. Wright |

| 14 April 1990 34 | Wimbledon | 1–1 | Norwich City | London |
| | Fashanu 55' | Report | Bowen 42' | Stadium: Plough Lane; Attendance: 4,638; Referee: K. Burge |

| 16 April 1990 35 | Norwich City | 0–1 | Manchester City | Norwich |
| | | Report | Heath 4' | Stadium: Carrow Road; Attendance: 18,914; Referee: D. Elleray |

| 21 April 1990 36 | Derby County | 0–2 | Norwich City | Derby |
| | | Report | Rosario 7'; Fox 73' | Stadium: Baseball Ground; Attendance: 13,758; Referee: P. Don |

| 28 April 1990 37 | Aston Villa | 3–3 | Norwich City | Birmingham |
| | McGrath 63'; Cascarino 65'; Platt 68' | Report | Fox 30'; Mountfield 79' (o.g.); Rosario 83' | Stadium: Villa Park; Attendance: 28,968; Referee: R. Milford |

| 5 May 1990 38 | Norwich City | 2–2 | Arsenal | Norwich |
| | Bowen 13'; Fox 45' | Report | Smith 44' 77' | Stadium: Carrow Road; Attendance: 19,256; Referee: J. Martin |

=== FA Cup ===
| 6 January 1990 Third Round | Exeter City | 1–1 | Norwich City | Exeter |
| | Rowbotham 85' | Report | Fleck 86' | Stadium: St. James Park; Attendance: 9,061; Referee: P. Foakes |

| 10 January 1990 Third Round Replay | Norwich City | 2–0 | Exeter City | Norwich |
| | Rosario 7'; Gordon 76' | Report | | Stadium: Carrow Road; Attendance: 18,202; Referee: P. Foakes |

| 28 January 1990 Fourth Round | Norwich City | 0–0 | Liverpool | Norwich |
| | | Report | | Stadium: Carrow Road; Attendance: 23,152; Referee: K. Hackett |

| 31 January 1990 Fourth Round Replay | Liverpool | 3–1 | Norwich City | Liverpool |
| | Nicol 18'; Barnes 56'; Beardsley 64' (pen.) | Report | Fleck 20' | Stadium: Anfield; Attendance: 29,339; Referee: K. Hackett |

=== League Cup ===
| 20 September 1989 Second Round, First Leg | Norwich City | 1–1 | Rotherham United | Norwich |
| | Fleck 32' | Report | Williamson 41' | Stadium: Carrow Road; Attendance: 9,531; Referee: R. Wiseman |

| 3 October 1989 Second Round, Second Leg | Rotherham United | 0–2 | Norwich City | Rotherham |
| | | Report | Gordon 7'; Fleck 29' | Stadium: Millmoor Ground; Attendance: 9,064; Referee: K. Breen |

| 25 October 1989 Third Round | Manchester City | 3–1 | Norwich City | Manchester |
| | White 31'; Bishop 51'; Allen 85' | Report | Fleck 90' | Stadium: Maine Road; Attendance: 20,126; Referee: T. Holbrook |

=== Full Members Cup ===
| 29 November 1989 Second Round | Norwich City | 5–0 | Brighton and Hove Albion | Norwich |
| | Mortensen 19'; Crook 41'; Sherwood 51'; Gordon 52'; Rosario 72' | Report | | Stadium: Carrow Road; Attendance: 5,704; Referee: D. Elleray |

| 24 January 1990 Quarter-Final | Swindon Town | 4–1 | Norwich City | Swindon |
| | Shearer 33'; Foley 43'; Bodin 73'; White 87' | Report | Phillips 37' | Stadium: County Ground; Attendance: 5,314; Referee: G. Ashby |

== Appearances ==
| Pos | Player | League | | | FA Cup | | | League Cup | | | Full Members Cup | | | Total | | |
| Pos | Player | Starts | Sub | Goals | Starts | Sub | Goals | Starts | Sub | Goals | Starts | Sub | Goals | Starts | Subs | Goals |
Goalkeepers
| GK | Bryan Gunn | 37 | 0 | 0 | 4 | 0 | 0 | 3 | 0 | 0 | 2 | 0 | 0 | 46 | 0 | 0 |
| GK | Mark Walton | 1 | 0 | 0 | – | – | – | – | – | – | – | – | – | 1 | 0 | 0 |
Defenders
| RB | Ian Culverhouse | 31 | 1 | 0 | 4 | 0 | 0 | – | – | – | 1 | 0 | 0 | 36 | 1 | 0 |
| LB | Mark Bowen | 38 | 0 | 7 | 4 | 0 | 0 | 3 | 0 | 0 | 2 | 0 | 0 | 47 | 0 | 7 |
| CB | Ian Butterworth | 22 | 0 | 0 | 4 | 0 | 0 | 3 | 0 | 0 | 2 | 0 | 0 | 29 | 0 | 0 |
| CB | Andy Linighan | 37 | 0 | 2 | 4 | 0 | 0 | 3 | 0 | 0 | 2 | 0 | 0 | 46 | 0 | 2 |
| RCB | Adrian Pennock | 1 | 0 | 0 | – | – | – | – | – | – | – | – | – | 1 | 0 | 0 |
| CB | Nicky Tanner | 6 | 0 | 0 | – | – | – | – | – | – | – | – | – | 6 | 0 | 0 |
Midfielders
| CM | Andy Townsend | 35 | 0 | 3 | 4 | 0 | 0 | 3 | 0 | 0 | 2 | 0 | 0 | 44 | 0 | 3 |
| CM | Ian Crook | 34 | 1 | 0 | 4 | 0 | 0 | 3 | 0 | 0 | 2 | 0 | 1 | 43 | 1 | 1 |
| RW | Dale Gordon | 26 | 0 | 3 | 4 | 0 | 1 | 3 | 0 | 1 | 2 | 0 | 1 | 35 | 0 | 6 |
| LW | David Phillips | 38 | 0 | 4 | 4 | 0 | 0 | 3 | 0 | 0 | 2 | 0 | 1 | 47 | 0 | 5 |
| DM | Tim Sherwood | 22 | 5 | 3 | – | – | – | 3 | 0 | 0 | 1 | 1 | 1 | 26 | 6 | 4 |
| AM | Ruel Fox | 6 | 1 | 3 | – | – | – | – | – | – | – | – | – | 6 | 1 | 3 |
| AM | Henrik Mortensen | 12 | 3 | 0 | – | – | – | – | – | – | 1 | 0 | 1 | 13 | 3 | 1 |
| CM | Jeremy Goss | 3 | 4 | 0 | – | – | – | – | – | – | – | – | – | 3 | 4 | 0 |
| CM | Paul Cook | 0 | 2 | 0 | – | – | – | – | – | – | – | – | – | 0 | 2 | 0 |
| CM | David Smith | 0 | 1 | 0 | – | – | – | – | – | – | – | – | – | 0 | 1 | 0 |
Forwards
| ST | Robert Fleck | 25 | 2 | 7 | 4 | 0 | 2 | 3 | 0 | 3 | 1 | 0 | 0 | 34 | 2 | 12 |
| ST | Robert Rosario | 29 | 2 | 5 | 4 | 0 | 1 | 3 | 0 | 0 | 2 | 0 | 1 | 38 | 2 | 7 |
| ST | Malcolm Allen | 9 | 3 | 3 | – | – | – | 0 | 1 | 0 | 0 | 1 | 0 | 9 | 5 | 3 |
| ST | Dean Coney | 6 | 3 | 0 | – | – | – | – | – | – | – | – | – | 6 | 3 | 0 |
| ST | Lee Power | 0 | 1 | 0 | – | – | – | – | – | – | – | – | – | 0 | 1 | 0 |

== Goalscorers ==
| Rank | Position | Player | Division One | FA Cup | League Cup | Full Members Cup | Total |
|---|---|---|---|---|---|---|---|
| 1 | ST | Robert Fleck | 7 | 2 | 3 | 0 | 12 |
| 2 | LB | Mark Bowen | 7 | 0 | 0 | 0 | 7 |
| 2 | ST | Robert Rosario | 5 | 0 | 1 | 1 | 7 |
| 3 | RW | Dale Gordon | 3 | 1 | 1 | 1 | 6 |
| 4 | LW | David Phillips | 4 | 0 | 0 | 1 | 5 |
| 5 | RB/DM | Tim Sherwood | 3 | 0 | 0 | 1 | 4 |
| 6 | CM | Andy Townsend | 3 | 0 | 0 | 0 | 3 |
| 6 | ST | Malcolm Allen | 3 | 0 | 0 | 0 | 3 |
| 6 | RW | Ruel Fox | 3 | 0 | 0 | 0 | 3 |
| 7 | CB | Andy Linighan | 2 | 0 | 0 | 0 | 2 |
| 8 | CM | Ian Crook | 0 | 0 | 0 | 1 | 1 |
| 8 | ST | Henrik Mortensen | 0 | 0 | 0 | 1 | 1 |
| Own goals | | | 4 | 0 | 0 | 0 | 4 |
