= London Road, Shrewsbury =

Cricket ground in Shrewsbury, England

Coordinates: 52°41′41.44″N 2°43′22.86″W

London Road
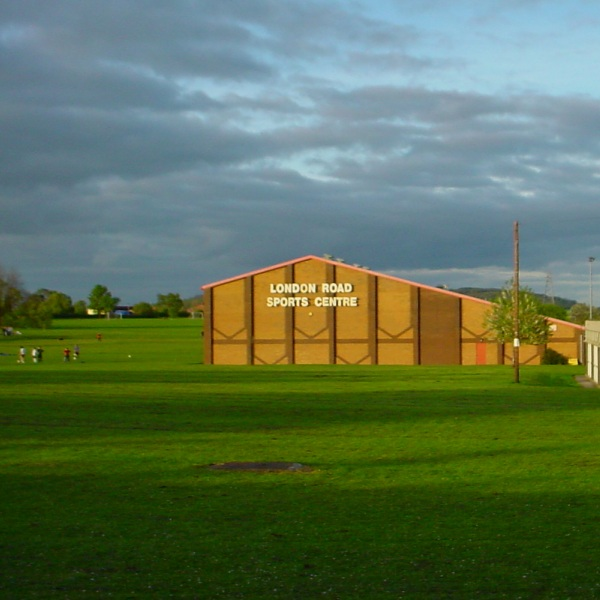

Ground information
- Location: Shrewsbury, Shropshire
- Establishment: 1914 (first recorded match)

Team information
Shropshire	(1957-present)
Minor Counties	(1984-1985)
- As of 15 August 2010; Source: Ground profile

London Road is a cricket ground in Shrewsbury, Shropshire. The first recorded match on the ground was in 1914, when Shrewsbury Cricket Club played Wem. Shropshire played their first Minor Counties Championship match at the ground against the Nottinghamshire Second XI in 1957. From 1957 to present, the ground has hosted 40 Minor Counties Championship matches. and 9 MCCA Knockout Trophy matches.

London Road has hosted 2 ICC Trophy matches. The first was in the 1979 competition between East Africa and Singapore and the second in the 1986 competition between Canada and Israel.

The ground has also held List-A matches. The first List-A match at the ground came in 1984 when a combined Minor Counties team played Derbyshire in the 1984 Benson & Hedges Cup. The following year the Minor Counties played Somerset in the 1985 competition. The next List-A match on London Road came in the 2001 Cheltenham & Gloucester Trophy against Devon. The following year, Shropshire played Gloucestershire in the 2002 Cheltenham & Gloucester Trophy.

In local domestic cricket, London Road is the home ground of Shrewsbury Cricket Club who play in the Birmingham and District Premier League.
