= International cricket in 1985 =

International cricket season

The 1985 international cricket season was from May 1985 to September 1985.

== Season overview ==
International tours
Start date	Home team	Away team	Results [Matches]			
Start date	Home team	Away team	Test	ODI	FC	LA
30 May 1985	England	Australia	3–1 [6]	1–2 [3]	—	—
25 August 1985	Sri Lanka	India	1–0 [3]	1–1 [3]	—	—

== May ==
=== Australia in England ===
ODI series
No.	Date	Home captain	Away captain	Venue	Result
ODI 329	30 May	David Gower	Allan Border	Old Trafford, Manchester	Australia by 3 wickets
ODI 330	1 June	David Gower	Allan Border	Edgbaston, Birmingham	Australia by 4 wickets
ODI 331	3 June	David Gower	Allan Border	Lord's, London	England by 8 wickets
The Ashes - Test series
No.	Date	Home captain	Away captain	Venue	Result
Test 1017	13–18 June	David Gower	Allan Border	Headingley, Leeds	England by 5 wickets
Test 1018	27 June–2 July	David Gower	Allan Border	Lord's, London	Australia by 4 wickets
Test 1019	11–16 July	David Gower	Allan Border	Trent Bridge, Nottingham	Match drawn
Test 1020	1–6 August	David Gower	Allan Border	Old Trafford, Manchester	Match drawn
Test 1021	15–20 August	David Gower	Allan Border	Edgbaston, Birmingham	England by an innings and 118 runs
Test 1022	29 August–2 September	David Gower	Allan Border	Kennington Oval, London	England by an innings and 94 runs

== August ==
=== India in Sri Lanka ===
ODI series
No.	Date	Home captain	Away captain	Venue	Result
ODI 332	25 August	Duleep Mendis	Kapil Dev	Sinhalese Sports Club, Colombo	India by 2 wickets
ODI 333	21 September	Duleep Mendis	Kapil Dev	P. Sara Oval, Colombo	Sri Lanka by 14 runs
ODI 334	22 September	Duleep Mendis	Kapil Dev	P. Sara Oval, Colombo	No result
Test series
No.	Date	Home captain	Away captain	Venue	Result
Test 1023	30 August–4 September	Duleep Mendis	Kapil Dev	Sinhalese Sports Club, Colombo	Match drawn
Test 1024	6–11 September	Duleep Mendis	Kapil Dev	P. Sara Oval, Colombo	Sri Lanka by 149 runs
Test 1025	14–19 September	Duleep Mendis	Kapil Dev	Asgiriya Stadium, Kandy	Match drawn
