= Bangladesh Women Sports Federation =

Sports organisation

- Formation: 1972
- Headquarters: Dhaka, Bangladesh
- Region served: Bangladesh
- Official language: Bengali

The Bangladesh Women Sports Federation is the national federation for women's sports and is responsible for governing and supporting women's sport in Bangladesh. Hamida Begum is the general secretary of the federation. Bangladesh Women Sports Association organizes training tournaments in its Dhanmondi complex according to its annual calendar regularly.

== History ==
Bangladesh Women Sports Federation was established in 1972. It manages Sultana Kamal Women's Sports Complex and is financed by rent from the sports complex.

In 2004, Bangladesh Women Sports Federation and Bangladesh Football Federation organized the first women's football tournament in Bangladesh. It featured six teams.

National Sports Council dissolved the executive committee of Bangladesh Women Sports Federation on 3 November 2011 and replaced it with a new committee. General Secretary Mahfuza Akhter Kiron filed a legal challenge against the National Sports Council decision. The National Sports Council also called for an immediate election. On 15 May 2012, Bangladesh High Court issued a stay order on the ad hoc committee of the Bangladesh Women Sports Association.
