= Muslim Kanji =

Kenyan cricketer and cricket coach

Personal information
- Full name: Muslim Kanji
- Born: Kenya
- Died: 7 March 2010; London, England
- Batting: Unknown
- Role: Wicket-keeper

Career statistics
Competition	First-class
Matches	1
Runs scored	4
Batting average	2.00
100s/50s	–/–
Top score	2
Catches/stumpings	2/–
- Source: Cricinfo, 19 September 2021

Muslim Kanji (date of birth unknown – 7 March 2010) was a Kenyan first-class cricketer.

Kanji represented Kenya in two editions of the ICC Trophy in 1982 and 1990, making seven appearances. He also made one appearance in first-class cricket for Kenya against the touring Pakistan Starlets at Nairobi in 1986. Batting twice in the match, he was dismissed for 2 runs in each of Kenya's two innings, both times by Sajjad Akbar. Kanji died in London in March 2010.
