= 1986 John Player Triangular Tournament =

International cricket tournament

The 1986 John Player Triangular Tournament was a cricket tournament held in Sri Lanka between 5 and 7 April 1986. Three teams took part in the tournament: Pakistan, New Zealand and hosts Sri Lanka. The tournament ran concurrently with the 1986 Asia Cup and was arranged partly to compensate for the withdrawal of India from the Asia Cup.

The John Player Triangular Tournament was a round-robin tournament where each team played the other once. Each of the three teams won one match each and Pakistan won the tournament on run rate.

== Matches ==
=== Table ===
| Team | P | W | L | T | NR | RR | Points |
|---|---|---|---|---|---|---|---|
| Pakistan | 2 | 1 | 1 | 0 | 0 | 4.763 | 2 |
| New Zealand | 2 | 1 | 1 | 0 | 0 | 4.519 | 2 |
| Sri Lanka | 2 | 1 | 1 | 0 | 0 | 3.891 | 2 |

5 April 1986
Scorecard
Wisden Report

| Sri Lanka; 137/9 (43 overs) | v | New Zealand; 140/4 (36.2 overs) |
| LRD Mendis 24 (31); W Watson 3/15 (9 overs) | | KR Rutherford 34 (50); A Ranatunga 2/17 (6 overs) |

New Zealand won by 6 wickets
Khettarama Stadium, Colombo
Umpires: HD Bird (ENG) and Mahboob Shah (PAK)
Player of the match: MC Snedden (NZ)

- New Zealand won the toss and elected to field.
- The match was reduced to 43 overs per side.
- W Watson (NZ) made his ODI debut.

6 April 1986
Scorecard
Wisden Report

| Pakistan; 191/9 (45 overs) | v | Sri Lanka; 195/5 (42.2 overs) |
| Javed Miandad 67 (100); KN Amalean 4/46 (9 overs) | | A Ranatunga 57 (55); Abdul Qadir 3/32 (9 overs) |

Sri Lanka won by 5 wickets
Sinhalese Sports Club Ground, Colombo
Umpires: HD Bird (ENG) and DR Shepherd (ENG)
Player of the match: Javed Miandad (PAK)

- Sri Lanka won the toss and elected to field.
- This match was also the final of the 1986 Asia Cup.

7 April 1986
Scorecard
Wisden Report

| New Zealand; 214/8 (42 overs) | v | Pakistan; 217/6 (40.4 overs) |
| MD Crowe 75 (85); Mohsin Kamal 4/47 (8 overs) | | Javed Miandad 68 (81); MC Snedden 2/55 (8.4 overs) |

Pakistan won by 4 wickets
Sinhalese Sports Club Ground, Colombo
Umpires: HC Felsinger (SL) and PW Vidanagamage (SL)
Player of the match: MD Crowe (NZ)

- Pakistan won the toss and elected to field.
- The match was reduced to 42 overs per side.

== See also ==
- 1986 Asia Cup
