= John Hopkins (cricketer) =

Welsh cricketer

Cricket information
- Batting: Right-handed

Career statistics
Competition	First-class	List A
Matches	305	264
Runs scored	13,742	5,657
Batting average	27.32	23.76
100s/50s	18/64	2/33
Top score	230	130*
Balls bowled	157	–
Wickets	0	–
Bowling average	–	–
5 wickets in innings	–	–
10 wickets in match	–	–
Best bowling	–	–
Catches/stumpings	213/1	69/1
- Source: Cricinfo, 3 February 2023

John Anthony Hopkins (born 16 June 1953) is a former Welsh cricketer who played for Glamorgan.

Hopkins was a right-handed batsman and part-time wicket-keeper. He first kept for Glamorgan at the age of 17 years and 68 days which was a record for the county and the Sunday League competition. With Eifion Jones commanding a regular place behind the stumps he was forced to concentrate on his batting and was soon opening the batting for Glamorgan. His highest score of 230 was made against Worcestershire at New Road.

His brother, Jeffris, also played first-class cricket.
