= Dennis Wainwright =

Bermudian cricketer (1935–2024)

Personal information
- Full name: Dennis Arlen Wainwright (Note: CricInfo gives Wainwright's forename as David. CricketArchive and a number of Bermudan press reports give it as Dennis.)
- Born: 17 November 1935; Bermuda
- Died: December 2024 (aged 89)
- Batting: Right-handed
- Role: Wicket-keeper

Domestic team information
- Years: Team
- 1971/72: Bermuda

Career statistics
Competition	First-class
Matches	1
Runs scored	11
Batting average	5.50
100s/50s	0/0
Top score	7
Catches/stumpings	0/2
- Source: Cricinfo, 13 October 2011

Dennis Arlen Wainwright MBE (17 November 1935 – December 2024) was a Bermudian cricketer who played as a right-handed batsman and a wicket-keeper. He played one first-class cricket match for Bermuda against New Zealand in 1972. It was the maiden first-class match to be played by the Bermuda cricket team. As well as playing cricket, Wainwright was the goalkeeper for the Bermuda national football team.

Wainwright was born in Bermuda in 1935 and grew up in the Flatts area of the island. He was educated at Harrington Sound and played island cricket for the Flatts side and for St George's Cricket Club, opening the batting and captaining the side for a period. He played from 1957 until at least 1984, including playing non-first-class matches against a number of touring international and English county sides and touring England, Canada and North America with Bermuda Wanderers. On a tour of England in 1961 he was part of an opening partnership with Sheridan Raynor of 253 runs against an English Counties XI.

After retirement he remained involved in St George's cricket and was awarded an MBE in the 2005 Birthday Honours for services to sport and community on Bermuda. Wainwright died in December 2024, at the age of 89.
