= Naguib Verjee =

Kenyan cricketer

Personal information
- Full name: Naguib Verjee
- Born: Kenya
- Batting: Unknown
- Bowling: Unknown

Career statistics
Competition	First-class
Matches	1
Runs scored	38
Batting average	19.00
100s/50s	–/–
Top score	22
Balls bowled	18
Wickets	0
Bowling average	–
5 wickets in innings	–
10 wickets in match	–
Best bowling	–
Catches/stumpings	2/–
- Source: Cricinfo, 20 September 2021

Naguib Verjee (date of birth unknown) is a Kenyan former first-class cricketer.

Verjee represented Kenya at the ICC Trophy in 1982 and 1986, making eleven appearances. He also made one appearance in first-class cricket for Kenya against the touring Pakistan Starlets at Nairobi in 1986. Batting twice, he was dismissed in the Kenyan first innings for 22 runs by Sajjad Akbar, while in their second innings he was dismissed for 16 runs by Nadeem Ghauri.
