= Shannon Rayner =

Personal information
- Born: 26 March 1984 (age 42); Bermuda
- Batting: Right-handed
- Bowling: Left-arm medium

International information
- National side: Bermuda

Career statistics
Competition	FC	LA	T20
Matches	1	2	1
Runs scored	12	9	0
Batting average	6.00	4.50	0.00
100s/50s	0/0	0/0	0/0
Top score	10	5	0
Balls bowled	54	60	12
Wickets	0	0	1
Bowling average	–	–	31.00
5 wickets in innings	–	–	0
10 wickets in match	–	–	0
Best bowling	–	–	1/31
Catches/stumpings	0/–	1/–	2/–
- Source: Cricinfo, 31 March 2013

Shannon Rayner (born 26 March 1984) is a Bermudian cricketer. Rayner is a right-handed batsman who bowls left-arm medium pace.

Rayner made his debut for Bermuda in 2010 in a List A match against Namibia at Wanderers Cricket Ground, Windhoek, during Bermuda's tour to Namibia. He later made his first-class debut in July 2010 in the Intercontinental Shield against the United Arab Emirates at the National Stadium, Hamilton. Immediately following this match, he made a further List A appearance against the same opposition, before making a single Twenty20 appearance against the same opposition, in which he took the wicket of Abdul Rehman in the United Arab Emirates innings of 178/7, with Rayner finishing with figures of 1/31 from two overs, while in Bermuda's unsuccessful chase he was dismissed for a duck by Saqib Ali.
