= Randall Robinson (cricketer) =

Bermudian cricketer

Personal information
- Full name: Randall Robinson
- Born: 31 December 1984 (age 41); Bermuda
- Batting: Right-handed
- Bowling: Right-arm fast-medium

Domestic team information
- Years: Team
- 2007/08: Bermuda

Career statistics
Competition	Twenty20
Matches	1
Runs scored	1
Batting average	1.00
100s/50s	–/–
Top score	1
Balls bowled	–
Wickets	–
Bowling average	–
5 wickets in innings	–
10 wickets in match	–
Best bowling	–
Catches/stumpings	–/–
- Source: Cricinfo, 1 April 2013

Randall Robinson (born 31 December 1984) is a Bermudian cricketer. Robinson is a right-handed batsman who bowls right-arm fast-medium.

In January 2008, Bermuda were again invited to part in the 2008 Stanford 20/20, where Robinson made a single Twenty20 appearance against Guyana in the first round. Bermuda made 62/9 from their twenty overs, with Robinson contributing a single run before he was dismissed by Mahendra Nagamootoo. Guyana's won the match by nine wickets.
