= John Millener =

New Zealand physicist and cricketer (born 1944)

- Born: David John Millener; 2 May 1944 (age 82); Auckland, New Zealand
- Occupation: Physicist
- Awards: Fellow of the American Physical Society (1993)

Academic background
- Education: St Catherine's College, Oxford
- Thesis: Shell Model Studies in Light Nuclei (1972)

Academic work
- Institutions: Brookhaven National Laboratory
- Cricket career

Cricket information
- Batting: Right-handed
- Bowling: Right-arm fast-medium
- Role: Opening bowler

Domestic team information
- Years: Team
- 1964–65 to 1967–68: Auckland
- 1969 to 1973: Oxford University

Career statistics
Competition	FC	List A
Matches	26	4
Runs scored	176	3
Batting average	9.77	3.00
100s/50s	0/0	0/0
Top score	24	1*
Balls bowled	1,958	240
Wickets	57	6
Bowling average	34.35	23.83
5 wickets in innings	0	0
10 wickets in match	0	–
Best bowling	4/97	2/51
Catches/stumpings	9/–	1/–
- Source: Cricinfo, 18 March 2025

David John Millener (born 2 May 1944) is a New Zealand physicist and former cricketer. He played 26 matches of first-class cricket for Auckland and Oxford University between 1964 and 1970. Since 1976 he has lived in the United States, pursuing a career as a nuclear physicist at the Brookhaven National Laboratory.

== Education and career ==
Millener was born in Auckland. His father was a lecturer in botany at the University of Auckland. He attended Auckland Grammar School before going on to the University of Auckland. He was awarded a Rhodes Scholarship to study at St Catherine's College, Oxford, where he gained a doctorate (D.Phil.) in physics in 1972 with a thesis entitled "Shell Model Studies in Light Nuclei". He stayed on at Oxford as a post-doctoral fellow for three years.

He moved to the United States to work at the Brookhaven National Laboratory at Upton, New York, in 1976. He worked there as a physicist until 2013, when he retired from full-time work, retaining the title of guest physicist. He specialised in research in nuclear structure and hyper-nuclear physics. In 1993 the American Physical Society awarded him a Division of Nuclear Physics Fellowship, "For significant contributions to understanding the structure of light nuclei; particularly non-normal parity states and to hyper-nuclear spectroscopy and the application of SU(3) symmetries." He has contributed more than 80 articles to scientific journals.

== Cricket ==
A right-arm fast-medium bowler, Millener played regularly for the Auckland Plunket Shield team between 1964–65 and 1967–68. He played for Oxford University between 1969 and 1973. He represented the United States in the 1982 ICC Trophy in England. His most successful first-class match was Oxford University's victory over D. H. Robins' XI in 1969, when he took 3 for 41 and 4 for 97.
