= Shiraz Ali =

Bermudian cricketer (1934–2020)

Personal information
- Full name: Shiraz Ali
- Born: 28 June 1934; Bermuda
- Died: 2020 (aged 85–86)
- Batting: Right-handed
- Bowling: Slow left-arm orthodox

Domestic team information
- Years: Team
- 1971/72: Bermuda

Career statistics
Competition	First-class
Matches	1
Runs scored	5
Batting average	2.50
100s/50s	–/–
Top score	5
Balls bowled	78
Wickets	–
Bowling average	–
5 wickets in innings	–
10 wickets in match	–
Best bowling	–
Catches/stumpings	1/–
- Source: CricketArchive, 13 October 2011

Shiraz Ali (28 June 1934 – 2020) was a Bermudian cricketer. He was born in Bermuda and was a right-handed batsman and a left-arm spin bowler. He played one first-class match for Bermuda, against New Zealand in 1972. It was the maiden first-class match to be played by the Bermuda cricket team. Ali died in 2020.
