= Geoff Ellis =

Welsh cricketer

Personal information
- Full name: Geoffrey Phillip Ellis
- Born: 24 May 1950 (age 76); Llandudno, Caernarfonshire, Wales
- Batting: Right-handed
- Bowling: Right-arm medium

International information
- National side: Wales

Domestic team information
- Years: Team
- 1988–1989: Wales Minor Counties
- 1970–1976: Glamorgan

Career statistics
Competition	First-class	List A
Matches	75	62
Runs scored	2,673	1,086
Batting average	20.72	23.10
100s/50s	1/10	–/–
Top score	116	97*
Balls bowled	2,824	1,707
Wickets	24	40
Bowling average	59.08	30.35
5 wickets in innings	–	–
10 wickets in match	–	–
Best bowling	2/20	3/16
Catches/stumpings	24/–	15/–
- Source: Cricinfo, 30 July 2012

Geoffrey Phillip Ellis (born 24 May 1950) is a former Welsh cricketer. Ellis was a right-handed batsman who bowled right-arm medium pace. He was born at Llandudno, Caernarfonshire.

== Career with Glamorgan ==
Ellis made his first-class debut for Glamorgan against Oxford University in 1970. He made eight first-class appearances for the county in that season, scoring 318 runs at an average of 26.50, with a high score of 55. This score was one of two half centuries he made in his debut season. He also made his List A debut in the 1970 John Player League against Nottinghamshire, with him making three further appearances in that season's competition, In 1971, he made just a single first-class appearance against Lancashire in the County Championship. In the following season, Ellis made six appearances for Glamorgan, scoring 223 runs at an average of 20.27, with a high score of 54. As was the case in 1971, he did not feature in any List A matches during the season. In 1973, Ellis made eleven first-class appearances, scoring 322 runs at an average of 18.94, with a high score of 64, which was his only score of above fifty that season. He made his first List A appearance since his debut season in 1970, playing one match each against Minor Counties South in the Benson & Hedges Cup and Gloucestershire in the Gillette Cup, as well as making five List A appearances in the John Player League. He scored a total of 128 runs in his seven List A appearances in 1973, which came at an average of 21.33, with a high score of 47 not out.

In 1974, Ellis made ten first-class appearances, scoring 356 runs at an average of 22.25, in the process recording his maiden, and what would be his only, first-class century, with a score of 116 against Middlesex at Sophia Gardens. He also made fifteen List A appearances in 1974, spread across the Benson & Hedges Cup, Gillette Cup and John Player League, scoring 107 runs at a low average of 11.88, with nearly half of his List A runs in that season coming against Worcestershire in the John Player League, which was also his maiden half century in that format. He also had his first season of note with the ball, with Ellis seeing some success in one-day cricket, with 14 wickets at a bowling average of 29.00, with best figures of 3/22. In 1975, Ellis made his most first-class appearances in a season for Glamorgan up to that point, with eighteen. In these, he scored a total of 624 runs at an average of 18.90, with a high score of 63, one of only two times he passed fifty in first-class cricket in that season. His part-time medium pace bowling was also further utilised in this season, with him taking 15 wickets in first-class cricket at an average of 46.80, with best figures of 46.80. This was to be his most successful season with the ball, eclipsing the four wickets he took in 1974. In List A cricket, he made seventeen appearances in 1975, scoring 337 runs at an average of 30.63, with a high score of 66, which was one of three half centuries he made in that format in that season. He also saw success with the ball in one-day cricket in 1975, taking 18 wickets at an average of 33.38, with best figures of 3/16. 1976 was to be Ellis' final season playing first-class and List A cricket for Glamorgan. He played twenty first-class matches in that season, with his final appearance coming against Kent in the 1976 County Championship. He scored 770 runs, his most in any given season, which came at an average of 20.26, with a high score of 74, one of four half centuries he made in that season. He also made nineteen List A appearances in that season, the last of which came against Somerset in the John Player League, with him scoring 487 runs at an average of 27.05, with a high score of 97 not out. This score was one of four half centuries he made in that season, with his unbeaten score of 97 against Yorkshire his highest score in that format.

In total, Ellis made 75 first-class appearances, scoring 2,673 runs at an average of 20.72. With the ball, he took 24 wickets at an average of 59.08, with best figures of 2/20. In List A cricket, he made a total of 62 appearances, scoring 1,086 runs at an average of 23.10. With the ball, he took 40 wickets at an average of 30.35, with best figures of 3/16.

== Later career ==
He later played for Wales in the 1979 ICC Trophy, a qualification tournament for the 1979 World Cup. He made three appearances during the tournament, against the Netherlands, Israel and the United States. He scored 3 runs in Wales' opening match victory against the Netherlands, while against Israel he scored 11 runs in another Wales victory. In a narrow eight run defeat to the United States, Ellis scored 56 runs. This was Wales' only appearance at the ICC Trophy, one from which they failed to qualify for the World Cup.

Nearly a decade later, Wales Minor Counties was formed, with Ellis playing in the team's inaugural Minor Counties Championship match against Oxfordshire in 1988. He made fifteen further Minor Counties Championship appearances for the team, the last of which came against Devon in 1989. He also made two MCCA Knockout Trophy appearances for the team, both against Shropshire in 1988 (the team's inaugural match in the competition) and 1989.

He has since pursued a successful career in the pharmaceutical industry.<NH/2019>
