= David Defoe =

Dominican-Dutch cricketer (born 1949)

Personal information
- Born: 5 April 1949 (age 77); Dominica
- Batting: Left-handed
- Bowling: Left-arm fast-medium

International information
- National side: Netherlands (1982)

Domestic team information
- Years: Team
- 1970–1972: Windward Islands (West Indies)
- 1970: Combined Islands (West Indies)
- Source: CricketArchive, 8 March 2016

David Defoe (born 5 April 1949) is a former international cricketer who represented the Dutch national team at the 1982 ICC Trophy. He was born in Dominica, and before emigrating to the Netherlands represented the Windward Islands and Combined Islands in West Indian domestic cricket.

A left-arm pace bowler, Defoe made his first-class debut for the Windward Islands in January 1970, in a friendly match against the Leeward Islands. Having taken 2/21 and 4/23 on debut, he was called up to the Combined Islands later in the season, playing three Shell Shield games. Defoe made regular appearances for the Windwards over the following two seasons, including against the touring New Zealanders in April 1972. His final appearance for the team came in September 1972, against the Leewards. Having emigrated to the Netherlands, Defoe was selected to make his international debut at the 1982 ICC Trophy in England. He played in three of his team's seven matches, and took three wickets. All of those came in the same match, against Malaysia, where he finished with figures of 3/29 from 11 overs.
