= Dhanmondi Cricket Stadium =

Stadium in Dhaka, Bangladesh

- Interactive map of Dhanmondi Cricket Stadium
- Location: Dhaka
- Country: Bangladesh
- Coordinates: 23.7408°N 90.3805°E
- Capacity: 9,000
- Owner: Dhanmondi Cricket Academy
- Operator: Dhaka Division, Dhaka Metropolis, Dhanmondi Cricket Academy
- As of 30 June 2009; Source: Dhanmondi Cricket Stadium, Cricinfo

Dhanmondi Cricket Stadium is a stadium in Dhaka, Bangladesh that hosts domestic and inter-collegiate cricket matches. It is the home of the Dhaka division cricket team, competes in the National Cricket League.
