= Jeffris Hopkins =

Welsh cricketer

Personal information
- Full name: Jeffris David Hopkins
- Born: 23 August 1950 (age 76); Bridgend, Glamorgan, Wales
- Batting: Right-handed
- Role: Wicket-keeper
- Relatives: John Hopkins (brother)

Domestic team information
- Years: Team
- 1969–1972: Middlesex

Career statistics
Competition	First-class	List A
Matches	4	2
Runs scored	8	1
Batting average	1.60	1.00
100s/50s	0/0	0/0
Top score	4	1
Catches/stumpings	9/–	2/1
- Source: Cricinfo, 17 March 2012

Jeffris David Hopkins (born 23 August 1950) is a former Welsh cricketer. Hopkins was a right-handed batsman who fielded as a wicket-keeper. He was born at Bridgend, Glamorgan.

Having played for the Glamorgan Second XI since in 1967 and 1968, Hopkins joined Middlesex for the 1969 season, making his first-class debut in that same season against Lancashire in the County Championship. He also made his List A debut in that same season, against Essex in the Player's County League. With opportunities limited at Middlesex due to presence of regular wicket-keeper John Murray, Hopkins made just three further first-class appearances, the last of which came against Northamptonshire in the 1972 County Championship, as well as appearing in just one more List A match, against Derbyshire in the 1971 John Player League. Hopkins failed to make an impression at Middlesex, scoring 8 runs at an average of 1.60 in first-class cricket, while taking 9 catches.

He later appeared for Wales in their only ICC Trophy appearance in 1979, playing in three matches against the Netherlands, Israel and the United States. He made scores of 92 against Israel and 72 against the United States.

Hopkins' brother, John, also played first-class cricket.
