= Roy Dias =

Sri Lankan cricketer

Personal information
- Full name: Roy Luke Dias
- Born: 18 October 1952 (age 74); Colombo, Dominion of Ceylon
- Batting: Right-handed
- Bowling: Right-arm off break
- Role: Batsman

International information
- National side: Sri Lanka (1979–1987)
- Test debut (cap 4): 17 February 1982 v England
- Last Test: 16 April 1987 v New Zealand
- ODI debut (cap 15): 9 June 1979 v New Zealand
- Last ODI: 30 October 1987 v England

Domestic team information
- Years: Team
- 1974/75–1991/92: Colombo Cricket Club

Head coaching information
- Years: Team
- 1998–1999: Sri Lanka
- 2001–2010: Nepal
- 2011: Oman
- 2012–2013: Malaysia

Career statistics
| Competition | Test | ODI | FC | LA |
|---|---|---|---|---|
| Matches | 20 | 58 | 93 | 89 |
| Runs scored | 1,285 | 1,573 | 4,296 | 2,363 |
| Batting average | 36.71 | 31.46 | 32.05 | 31.50 |
| 100s/50s | 3/8 | 2/11 | 5/24 | 3/14 |
| Top score | 109 | 121 | 144 | 121 |
| Balls bowled | 24 | 56 | 180 | 56 |
| Wickets | 0 | 3 | 1 | 3 |
| Bowling average | – | 23.33 | 118.00 | 23.33 |
| 5 wickets in innings | – | 0 | 0 | 0 |
| 10 wickets in match | – | 0 | 0 | 0 |
| Best bowling | – | 3/25 | 1/9 | 3/25 |
| Catches/stumpings | 6/0 | 16/0 | 39/0 | 24/0 |
- Source: Cricinfo, 20 February 2019

Roy Luke Dias (born 18 October 1952) is a former Sri Lankan cricketer who played Test matches and One Day Internationals for the national team.

In 1977 he played for Denton St. Lawrence CC in the Lancashire and Cheshire League

An elegant and stylish right-handed batsman he played 20 Test matches and became the first Sri Lankan to hit 1,000 Test runs. He played representative cricket for Sri Lanka from 1979 to 1987.

== International career ==
With his 214 runs in the 1979 ICC Trophy he was an integral part of Sri Lanka's tournament victory, as he played four matches with a batting average of 71.33, scoring 214 runs. The victory meant Sri Lanka qualified for the 1979 cricket World Cup, and, surprisingly, Sri Lanka won one match in that tournament as well. Dias made a patient 50 as Sri Lanka made their way to 238 for 5, before bowling India out for a meagre 191.

Sri Lanka was promoted to Test status three years later, and Dias was picked for the first Test. He had a difficult start, being dismissed for a duck by Bob Willis as Sri Lanka fell to 11 for 2, but battled better in the second innings against England's spinners Derek Underwood and John Emburey. He made 77, but when he departed and the third wicket fell, Sri Lanka fell apart from 140 for 3 to 175 all out, and England chased 171 to win with relative ease.

Indeed, Sri Lanka's first Test matches were promising, but in the end it often ran away from them at crucial moments. An example of this would be Dias' third Test, which was the second Test of three in Pakistan. Batting first, Sidath Wettimuny and Dias added 217 for the second wicket, then a Sri Lankan record partnership for any wicket. That enabled Sri Lanka to be on top, leading by 184 on first innings, but they could not bowl out Pakistan and had to settle for a draw. Sri Lanka went on to lose the series 0–2, despite Dias recording a career best 109 in the Third Test.

Dias continued to make big scores, enjoying a personally good tour of India in September 1982, where he made his only two ODI centuries, with scores of 39, 102 and 121 in the three-match series. However, India won the series 3–0 after relatively convincing victories. Sri Lanka also played a Test match, and Dias made two fifties as he and Duleep Mendis cooperated to draw the match.

At the 1983 Cricket World Cup, Sri Lanka only won one match, and Dias contributed with his only fifty of the series. Pairing up with 80 for the third wicket with Brendon Kuruppu, Dias anchored the chase to 182, ending with 64 not out as Sri Lanka won by three wickets.

Sri Lanka continually improved, at least in Test cricket, but Dias' career went the other way. He made few big scores in Tests, but he made quite a few fifties in losing causes in ODIs. Then, in September 1985, India came to tour – a tour which was Sri Lanka's biggest success to date. In the first Test, Dias made 4 and 0, yet Sri Lanka dominated thanks to centuries from Ranjan Madugalle and Arjuna Ranatunga – India, however, survived out the five days and the match ended in a draw. However, in the second Test, Dias came in with the score 109 for 2 and made a stroke-filled 95 to lift Sri Lanka to 385. Then, India were bowled out for 244, and trailing by 141, but Dias scored a quick unbeaten 60 as Sri Lanka declared on 206 for 3, setting India 348 in a day. Despite 78 from Kapil Dev, India were bowled out by 198, and Sri Lanka recorded their first Test victory. Dias then recorded his third and last Test century in the third Test, as Dias survived for five hours with Duleep Mendis to save a draw and a series victory.

After this, Dias' career took a turn for the worse. He only passed 50 in Tests once again – in a drawn Test with India were 1096 runs were scored for the fall of only 17 wickets – and poor form saw him being dropped from the ODI team after the first match in the 1987 cricket World Cup, where he scored 1. He returned for the last match of the 1987 cricket World Cup, the team having played and lost four matches without him, and while his teammates failed to pass 40 he recorded 80 in his last international innings. However, the target of 219 was all too small, and Sri Lanka ended up without a single victory in that World Cup.

== Coaching career ==
In May 1998, Dias succeeded Bruce Yardley as head coach of Sri Lanka. His tenure saw Sri Lanka record its first away Test victory over England in 1998 and a loss to Pakistan in the final of the 1998–99 Asian Test Championship. He was sacked after the team's poor performance at the 1999 Cricket World Cup.

Dias was appointed head coach of Nepal in September 2001. He was appointed to an initial two-year contract, but ultimately remained as coach until 2010. His tenure saw Nepal finish runner-up at the 2004 ACC Trophy. He also oversaw the national under-19 team qualify for four editions of the Under-19 Cricket World Cup, recording multiple victories over ICC full members and finishing as plate champions in 2006.

In 2011, Dias was appointed coach of Oman. He coached the team at the 2011 ACC Twenty20 Cup. In 2012 he joined Cricket Malaysia as director of coaching and head coach of Malaysia on a two-year contract.

Dias was appointed coach of the Sri Lanka national under-19 cricket team in 2016. He was removed after the 2018 Under-19 Cricket World Cup.

== International centuries ==
Dias scored five international centuries, three in Test matches and two in ODIs.

Test centuries
| No. | Runs | Opponent | Venue | Date | Result | Ref |
|---|---|---|---|---|---|---|
| 1 | 109 | Pakistan | Gaddafi Stadium, Lahore | 22 March 1982 | Sri Lanka lost | |
| 2 | 108 | New Zealand | Sinhalese Sports Club Ground, Colombo | 16 March 1984 | Drawn | |
| 3 | 106 | England | Asgiriya Stadium, Kandy | 14 September 1985 | Drawn | |

ODI centuries
| No. | Runs | Opponent | Venue | Date | Result | Ref |
|---|---|---|---|---|---|---|
| 1 | 102 | India | Arun Jaitley Stadium, Delhi | 15 September 1982 | Sri Lanka lost | |
| 2 | 121 | India | M. Chinnaswamy Stadium, Bangalore | 26 September 1982 | Sri Lanka lost | |
