= Clevie Wade =

Bermudian cricketer

Personal information
- Full name: Cleveland P Wade
- Born: 29 April 1960 (age 66); Bermuda
- Batting: Right-handed
- Bowling: Right-arm medium

International information
- National side: Bermuda

Domestic team information
- Years: Team
- 1996/97: Bermuda

Career statistics
Competition	List A
Matches	3
Runs scored	29
Batting average	–
100s/50s	0/0
Top score	25*
Balls bowled	48
Wickets	0
Bowling average	–
5 wickets in innings	–
10 wickets in match	–
Best bowling	–
Catches/stumpings	0/–
- Source: CricketArchive, 13 October 2011

Cleveland P Wade (born 29 April 1960) is a former Bermudian cricketer. He was a right-handed batsman and right-arm medium pace bowler. He played in three List A matches for Bermuda in the 1996 Red Stripe Bowl. He also played for Bermuda in three ICC Trophy tournaments.
