= Dhanmondi Cricket Academy =

- Nickname: DCA
- League: Dhaka Metropolis Third Division Cricket League

Team information
- Founded: 2000
- Home ground: Dhanmondi road 4 field

Dhanmondi Cricket Academy is a Bangladeshi cricket academy who play in the Dhaka Metropolis Third Division Cricket League. The club has been a professional cricket club and academy since 2000.

Abu Mohammad Sabur (Jhilu) is the president of the academy while Arman Islam Nammu is the General Secretary, which is managed by Joint Secretary Tayeb Afzal and Manager Shahadat Hossain and coached by Sadiquzzaman Pintu. Its home ground is the Dhanmondi Road 4 cricket field.

The club was formed by residents of Dhanmondi.

== History ==
=== 1990s ===
Since the late 1980s, the children's park located in Dhanmondi Road 4 was in the grasp of drug dealers, sex workers, hijackers, etc. and as time wore on, the situation got worse. There was a time in the early and mid-1990s when the local residents were afraid to venture towards that park even during broad daylight after several incidents of hijacking and murder. A slum developed and sex workers were usually seen residing in the park. The seesaws, slides and swings provided by Dhaka City Corporation became so rusted and inoperative that it was hard to find a single child in the park. Drugs were sold so rampantly, the parents of the area were scared even if their children were passing by the children's park at that time.

=== Early days ===
The locals realised that the children's park would be lost and after taking permission from the local Ward Commissioner, the seesaws, swings, etc. were removed and some keen cricketers started practicing. Soon, DCA (a registered academy recognised both by the Government of Bangladesh and Bangladesh Cricket Board) was developed. In a roundtable meeting of The Daily Star few years ago, speakers lauded the efforts of this community. In 2002, the daily's senior reporter Morshed Ali Khan praised DCA on its work during a cricket tournament at the park in its sports page.
