= Daulat Zaman =

Bangladeshi cricketer (1947–2002)

Daulat-uz-Zaman (1947–30 March 2002) was a fast bowler who played first-class cricket for different teams in East Pakistan in the 1960s. Later, in 1979, he represented Bangladesh in the first ICC trophy tournament in England.

In 22 first-class matches he took 40 wickets at 35 runs apiece, with a career best of 5/105.

In the 1979 ICC Trophy he took 6 wickets at an average of 12.33. His best, 4/23, came against Malaysia.

After retiring as a player, he was involved with Victoria Sporting Club, one of the oldest cricket clubs in Dhaka (named after the empress). While attending a club match involving his beloved club, he died of a heart attack in March 2002.

== See also ==
- Marylebone Cricket Club cricket team in Bangladesh in 1976-77
