= Ashraful Haque (cricketer) =

Bangladeshi cricketer

Personal information
- Full name: Syed Ashraful Haque
- Nickname: Babu
- Batting: Right-handed

International information
- National side: Bangladesh

Domestic team information
- Years: Team
- 1970/71: Dacca University
- 1969/70: East Pakistan
- 1967/68: East Pakistan Whites

Career statistics
Competition	FC	ICC Trophy
Matches	5	4
Runs scored	196	76
Batting average	49.00	19.00
100s/50s	–/1	–/–
Top score	91	31
Balls bowled	360	218
Wickets	8	10
Bowling average	17.00	10.70
5 wickets in innings	–	1
10 wickets in match	–	–
Best bowling	3/23	7/23
Catches/stumpings	4/–	–/–
- Source: CricketArchive, 17 January 2011

Syed Ashraful Haque is a Bangladeshi cricket administrator and former cricketer who served as the chief executive officer (CEO) of Asian Cricket Council until 2015.

Previously, he played for Bangladesh national cricket team and was the architect of Bangladesh's first ever ICC Trophy victory, over Fiji in May 1979. He was also a member of the Bangladesh side that played in the historic match at Dhaka against the MCC in January 1977. A right hand batsman and an off break bowler, Ashraf remained an integral part of the national side until his retirement in 1981–82 season.

== ICC Trophy ==
The Water Orton Cricket Club ground, in Birmingham, was the unlikely setting for Bangladesh's first-ever international cricket match abroad. On May 24, 1979, Bangladesh played against Fiji in the first ICC Trophy tournament. Bangladesh were the firm favorites, yet batting first they only scored 103 all out. An upset looked on the cards, until Syed Ashraf came on to bowl. The magic of his spin completely mesmerized the Pacific islanders. From 40/2, Fiji collapsed to 81 all out. It was at that time the best figures for a Bangladeshi bowler in international cricket, until Obaidul Haq Azam improved the figures with his 7/18 against the MCC. It was also the record for best bowling in the ICC Trophy. Ole Mortensen, the Danish and Derbyshire fast bowler improved the figures with 7/19 against Israel in Kenya, 1994.

Ashraf had an impressive ICC Trophy with both bat and ball. He used his long experience in English conditions to great effect. As well as his success with the ball, he played several useful innings: 23 against Canada, 22 against Malaysia and 31 against Denmark.

== Other international matches ==
He was a part of the Bangladesh team that played in the historical game against the MCC at Dhaka in January 1977. He failed in the match, but he did score 68 for East Zone at Chittagong. In fact, he seemed to have a special liking for Chittagong. A year later, against test standard Sri Lankan side he scored 42 and 49, and captured 2 wickets for 70 runs at Chittagong.

He retired from international cricket after the 1981–82 season.

== In domestic cricket ==
He played most of his club cricket at Dhaka with the Azad Boys club. In national cricket, he became the first player to score a double hundred, scoring 214 for Bangladesh Shipping Corporation in 1981–82 season.

== As a cricket administrator ==
Haque served as the chief executive officer of the Asian Cricket Council until 2015.

== See also ==
- Marylebone Cricket Club cricket team in Bangladesh in 1976-77
- Sri Lankan cricket team in Bangladesh in 1977-78
- 1979 ICC Trophy
