= Charles Daulphin =

Bermudian cricketer (born 1936)

Personal information
- Full name: Charles A Daulphin
- Born: 15 September 1936 (age 90); Bermuda
- Batting: Right-handed
- Bowling: Right-arm medium-fast

Domestic team information
- Years: Team
- 1971/72: Bermuda

Career statistics
Competition	First-class
Matches	3
Runs scored	59
Batting average	29.50
100s/50s	–/1
Top score	50
Balls bowled	–
Wickets	–
Bowling average	–
5 wickets in innings	–
10 wickets in match	–
Best bowling	–
Catches/stumpings	–/–
- Source: CricketArchive, 13 October 2011

Charles Daulphin (born 15 September 1936, in Bermuda) is a former Bermudian cricketer. He was a right-handed batsman and a right-arm medium-pace bowler. He played one first-class match for Bermuda against New Zealand in 1972, scoring a half-century in Bermuda's second innings, the highest score for Bermuda in the match. This remained the only first-class half-century for Bermuda until 2004. It was also the maiden first-class match to be played by the Bermuda cricket team.
