= Andy Theodosiou =

English footballer

Andy Theodosiou (born 30 October 1970) is a former professional footballer. He was a defender who began his career as a trainee with Tottenham before joining Norwich City.

He was unable to break into the first team at his first two clubs, and did not make his league debut until he joined Hereford United in 1991. After leaving Hereford, he played briefly for Brighton before moving into non-league football.
