= Henrik Mortensen =

Danish footballer (born 1968)

Personal information
- Full name: Henrik Ejegod Mortensen
- Date of birth: 12 February 1968 (age 58)
- Place of birth: Odder, Denmark
- Position: Striker

Senior career*
Years	Team	Apps	(Gls)
1984–1985	AGF	21	(8)
1985–1988	Anderlecht	6	(2)
1988–1989	AGF	38	(12)
1989–1991	Norwich City	23	(2)
1992–1999	AGF	87	(10)

International career
1983	Denmark U17	5	(4)
1984–1985	Denmark U19	17	(8)
1988	Denmark U21	1	(0)
- * Club domestic league appearances and goals

Henrik Ejegod Mortensen (born 12 February 1968) is a Danish former professional footballer.

== Career ==
Mortensen was a striker who played for Aarhus Gymnastikforening, Anderlecht, and Norwich City. During his early career, he was voted Danish young player of the year and was capped by Denmark under-21s. After moving to Anderlecht he won a Belgian championship medal and played in both the European Cup and European cup-winners cup.

Dave Stringer signed him for Norwich for a fee of £350,000 shortly after the start of the 1989–90 season. The move generated considerable interest among Norwich supporters, and a large crowd saw him mark his debut for the club's reserves at Carrow Road by scoring a spectacular overhead kick. Mortensen scored on his first team debut in a Zenith Data Systems Cup match against Brighton but was unable to maintain his impressive start. An injury forced him to retire from the English game in 1991. He returned to Aarhus, where he won a Danish Cup winners medal in 1996.

== Sources ==
- Mark Davage; John Eastwood; Kevin Platt (2001). Canary Citizens. Jarrold Publishing. ISBN 0-7117-2020-7.
