= Sheridan Raynor =

Bermudian cricketer (1934–2011)

Personal information
- Full name: Sheridan Steede Raynor
- Born: 7 July 1934; Bermuda
- Died: 10 December 2011 (aged 77); Paget, Bermuda
- Batting: Left-handed
- Bowling: Slow left-arm orthodox

Domestic team information
- Years: Team
- 1971/72: Bermuda

Career statistics
Competition	First-class
Matches	1
Runs scored	13
Batting average	6.50
100s/50s	0/0
Top score	10
Catches/stumpings	1/–
- Source: CricketArchive, 13 October 2011

Sheridan Raynor (7 July 1934 – 10 December 2011) was a Bermudian cricketer. He was a left-handed batsman and a left-arm spin bowler. Although he only played one first-class match for Bermuda, against New Zealand in 1972, his abilities were such that Gary Sobers wanted Raynor to play for the West Indies team. Raynor, however, was ineligible as Bermuda was not part of the West Indies association. It was the maiden first-class match to be played by the Bermuda cricket team. Outside of cricket, Raynor worked as a taxi driver and spray mechanic.

Raynor died on 10 December 2011 as a result of complications from a stroke which he had suffered a year previously and from which he had never regained consciousness. Upon hearing the news of his death, the Bermudian parliament paused proceedings in tribute, and he was inducted into the Bermuda Sporting Hall of Fame.
