= Sudath Pasqual =

Sri Lankan cricketer (born 1961)

Personal information
- Full name: Sudath Prajiv Pasqual
- Born: 15 October 1961 (age 65); Colombo, Sri Lanka
- Batting: Left-handed
- Bowling: Right-arm medium

International information
- National side: Sri Lanka
- ODI debut (cap 17): 9 June 1979 v New Zealand
- Last ODI: 16 June 1979 v India

Career statistics
Competition	ODI	First-class
Matches	2	7
Runs scored	24	250
Batting average	24.00	35.71
100s/50s	0/0	1/0
Top score	23*	101*
Balls bowled	28	259
Wickets	0	2
Bowling average	–	72.00
5 wickets in innings	–	0
10 wickets in match	–	0
Best bowling	–	1/22
Catches/stumpings	0/–	3/–
- Source: Cricinfo, 1 May 2006

Sudath Prajiv Pasqual (born 15 October 1961) is a former Sri Lankan international cricketer who played two One Day Internationals during the 1979 World Cup competition.

He remains the youngest Sri Lankan ODI cricketer aged 17 years 237 days. A young cricketer he led Royal College Colombo at the Royal–Thomian in 1980,

His international career effectively finished when he emigrated to the United States in 1981 and attended Berea College then acquired his masters in political science. Having returned to cricket administration in Sri Lanka (1997–2008) he has now settled in Canada.
