= Lionel Thomas (cricketer) =

West Indian cricketer

Personal information
- Full name: Lionel Eustace Thomas
- Born: 19 February 1946 (age 80); Saint Kitts
- Batting: Right-handed
- Bowling: Right-arm medium

International information
- National side: Bermuda (1972–1982)

Domestic team information
- Years: Team
- 1967–1968: Leeward Islands
- Source: CricketArchive, 2 February 2016

Lionel Eustace Thomas (born 19 February 1946) is a former West Indian cricketer who played both for the Leeward Islands in West Indian domestic cricket and for Bermuda internationally.

Thomas was born in Saint Kitts, then part of the British Leeward Islands colony. A right-handed batsman, Thomas made his first-class debut for the Leeward Islands during the 1966–67 Shell Shield season, against Barbados, and also played against Jamaica later in the season. Against Jamaica, he made what were to be the two highest scores of his first-class career, 44 runs in the first innings and 77 in the second. However, Thomas only played two further matches for the Leewards – a friendly against the Windward Islands at the end of the 1966–67 season, and a match against the touring English team during the following season.

After emigrating to Bermuda, Thomas made his debut for the national team in 1972, in a match against the United States for the Henry Tucker Trophy. His first major international tournament was the 1979 ICC Trophy in England, where he played four matches (including the semi-final loss to Canada). Thomas made his last international appearances at the 1982 ICC Trophy. In his final match, against East Africa, he scored 68 runs. After retiring from playing, Thomas served on the selection committee for the national team, including for a period as chairman of selectors.
