= Joseph Bailey (cricketer) =

Bermudian cricketer (born 1942)

Personal information
- Full name: Joseph Lewis Oliver Bailey
- Born: 22 February 1942 (age 84); Bermuda
- Batting: Left-handed
- Bowling: Right-arm off break

International information
- National side: Bermuda

Domestic team information
- Years: Team
- 1971/72: Bermuda

Career statistics
Competition	First-class
Matches	1
Runs scored	2
Batting average	1.00
100s/50s	–/–
Top score	2
Balls bowled	72
Wickets	–
Bowling average	–
5 wickets in innings	–
10 wickets in match	–
Best bowling	–
Catches/stumpings	–/–
- Source: CricketArchive, 13 October 2011

Joseph Lewis Oliver Bailey (born 22 February 1942 in Bermuda) is a Bermudian former cricketer. He played as a left-handed batsman and a right-arm off-break bowler. He was the captain for Bermuda's inaugural first class match, against New Zealand in 1972. It was the maiden first-class match to be played by the Bermuda cricket team. He also represented Bermuda in the first two editions of the ICC Trophy.
