= Clarence Parfitt =

Bermudian/Scottish cricketer (born 1944)

Personal information
- Full name: Clarence Leon Parfitt
- Born: 16 July 1944 (age 82); St. George's Parish, Bermuda
- Batting: Left-handed
- Bowling: Left-arm medium

International information
- National side: Bermuda

Domestic team information
- Years: Team
- 1988–1990: Scotland
- 1971/72: Bermuda

Career statistics
Competition	First-class	List A
Matches	1	9
Runs scored	2	10
Batting average	–	10.00
100s/50s	–/–	–/–
Top score	1*	9*
Balls bowled	228	588
Wickets	5	9
Bowling average	12.20	30.33
5 wickets in innings	1	–
10 wickets in match	–	–
Best bowling	5/61	4/16
Catches/stumpings	1/–	1/–
- Source: CricketArchive, 13 October 2011

Clarence Parfitt (born 16 July 1944 in Bermuda) is a former Bermudian and Scottish cricketer. He was a left-handed batsman and left-arm medium pace bowler. He is reputed to be the greatest bowler that Bermuda has produced. He started his career in his native Bermuda, playing one first-class match against New Zealand in 1972, taking five wickets in New Zealand's only innings. It was the maiden first-class match to be played by the Bermuda cricket team. He also represented Bermuda in the 1979 ICC Trophy.

He later settled in Scotland and would go on to play for the Scottish cricket team on twelve occasions, including nine List A matches, between 1988 and 1990, making his debut against Derbyshire. He is now a Development Officer for Cricket Scotland, and was inducted into Bermuda's sporting hall of fame in 2004.
