= Cricket World Cup Qualifier =

International cricket tournament

ICC Cricket World Cup Qualifier
- Administrator: International Cricket Council
- Format: One-Day International
- First edition: 1979
- Tournament format: Multiple (refer to article)
- Number of teams: 10 (since 2014)
- Current champion: Sri Lanka (2nd title)
- Most successful: Zimbabwe (3 titles)
- Qualification: Cricket World Cup: 1979 (2 berths); 1982–90 (1 berth); 1994–2001 (3 berths); 2005 (5 berths); 2009 (4 berths); 2014–23 (2 berths); 2026–30 (4 berths)
- Most runs: (United Arab Emirates) Khurram Khan (1,369)
- Most wickets: (Netherlands) Roland Lefebvre (71)

The Cricket World Cup Qualifier (previously called the ICC Trophy and officially known as the ICC Men's Cricket World Cup Qualifier) is a One-Day International (ODI) cricket tournament that serves as the culmination of the qualification process for the Cricket World Cup. It is usually played in the year before the World Cup. Although the tournament has used a variety of formats, a final qualification event has been a feature of every World Cup since 1979.

From 1979 to 2001, all associate members of the International Cricket Council (ICC) were eligible to participate in the ICC Trophy. Regional qualification was introduced for the 2005 ICC Trophy – the final tournament to bear that name – with the World Cricket League (WCL) introduced in 2007. Until 2015, automatic qualification was granted to all full members of the ICC. However, for the 2019 Cricket World Cup, only the top eight teams in the ICC ODI Championship were given automatic qualification, meaning ICC full members played in the Qualifier for the first time. The WCL was discontinued in 2019, with qualification for the World Cup Qualifier instead determined by a series of leagues including the Super League, League 2 and Challenge League.

The number of qualifying berths available from the World Cup Qualifier currently stands at two for the 2023 event, but has varied from a minimum of one (1982, 1986, 1990) to a maximum of five (2005). Zimbabwe is the most successful team, having won three consecutive titles between 1982 and 1990, while Scotland and Sri Lanka are the only other teams to have won multiple titles. Historically, performance at the World Cup Qualifier has been a key determinant for elevation to full membership of the ICC and Test status, with Sri Lanka (1981), Zimbabwe (1992) and Bangladesh (2000) being awarded full membership after ICC Trophy wins.

In September 2018, the ICC confirmed that all matches in the ICC World Cup Qualifier will have ODI status, regardless if a team does not have ODI status prior to the start of an individual tournament event.

== Results ==
Year	Host	Final venue	Winner	Margin	Runner up
1979	England	Worcester	Sri Lanka; 324-8 (60 overs)	60 runs Scorecard	Canada; 264-5 (60 overs)
1982	England	Leicester	Zimbabwe; 232-5 (54.3 overs)	5 wickets Scorecard	Bermuda; 231-8 (60 overs)
1986	England	London	Zimbabwe; 243-9 (60 overs)	25 runs Scorecard	Netherlands; 218 (58.4 overs)
1990	Netherlands	The Hague	Zimbabwe; 198-4 (54.2 overs)	6 wickets Scorecard	Netherlands; 197-9 (60 overs)
1994	Kenya	Nairobi	United Arab Emirates; 282-8 (49.1 overs)	2 wickets Scorecard	Kenya; 281-6 (50 overs)
1997	Malaysia	Kuala Lumpur	Bangladesh; 166-8 (25 overs)	2 wickets (DLS); Scorecard	Kenya; 241-7 (50 overs)
2001	Canada	Toronto	Netherlands; 196-8 (50 overs)	2 wickets Scorecard	Namibia; 195-9 (50 overs)
2005	Ireland	Dublin	Scotland; 324-8 (50 overs)	47 runs Scorecard	Ireland; 277-9 (50 overs)
2009	South Africa	Centurion	Ireland; 188-1 (42.3 overs)	9 wickets Scorecard	Canada; 185 (48 overs)
2014	New Zealand	Lincoln	Scotland; 285-5 (50 overs)	41 runs Scorecard	United Arab Emirates; 244-9 (50 overs)
2018	Zimbabwe	Harare	Afghanistan; 206-3 (40.1 overs)	7 wickets Scorecard	West Indies; 204 (46.5 overs)
2023	Zimbabwe	Harare	Sri Lanka; 233 (47.5 overs)	128 runs Scorecard	Netherlands; 105 (23.3 overs)
2027	Namibia; South Africa				

== Leaderboard ==
Teams reaching the top four
Team	Titles	Runners-up	Third place	Fourth place	Apps
Zimbabwe	3 (1982, 1986, 1990)		1 (2018)	1 (2023)	5
Scotland	2 (2005, 2014)		2 (1997, 2023)	2 (2001, 2018)	7
Sri Lanka	2 (1979, 2023)				2
Netherlands	1 (2001)	3 (1986, 1990, 2023)	2 (1994, 2009)		12
Ireland	1 (2009)	1 (2005)		1 (1997)	7
United Arab Emirates	1 (1994)	1 (2014)			8
Bangladesh	1 (1997)		1* (1990)	1 (1982)	6
Afghanistan	1 (2018)				2
Canada		2 (1979, 2009)	2 (2001, 2005)		10
Kenya		2 (1994, 1997)	1* (1990)	1 (2009)	7
Bermuda		1 (1982)	1* (1979)	3 (1986, 1994, 2005)	9
Namibia		1 (2001)			6
West Indies		1 (2018)			2
Denmark			2 (1979*, 1986)		8
Papua New Guinea			1 (1982)	1 (2014)	10
Hong Kong			1 (2014)		8

- No play-off for third place was held at the 1979 and 1990 tournaments – teams defeated in the semi-finals are deemed to have shared third place and are indicated with an asterisk (*).

== Teams' performances ==
Legend

- Teams that qualified for the World Cup due to their performance in a particular edition are underlined.
- AQ – Team received automatic qualification to the World Cup, so did not participate in the Qualifier
- 1st – Champions
- 2nd – Runners-up
- 3rd – Third place
- SF – Losing semi-finalist (no third-place play-off)
- R1, R2 – First round, second round (no further play-offs)
- PO – Team lost in an inter-round play-off (2001 only; ranked 9th–10th)
- × – Qualified, but withdrew

Team	1979	1982	1986	1990	1994	1997	2001	2005	2009	2014	2018	2023	2027
Team	(England)	(England)	(England)	(Netherlands)	(Kenya)	(Malaysia)	(Canada)	(Ireland)	(South Africa)	(New Zealand)	(Zimbabwe)	(Zimbabwe)	(Namibia) (South Africa)
Africa
Kenya	—	R1	R1	SF	2nd	2nd	AQ		4th	5th	—	—	—
Namibia	Ineligible				R1	15th	2nd	7th	8th	6th	—	—	Q
Uganda	Ineligible						PO	12th	10th	10th	—	—	
Zimbabwe	—	1st	1st	1st	AQ						3rd	4th	AQ
Americas
Argentina	R1	×	R1	R1	R1	21st	R1	—	—	—	—	—	—
Bermuda	SF	2nd	4th	R1	4th	9th	PO	4th	9th	—	—	—	—
Canada	2nd	R1	R1	R2	R2	7th	3rd	3rd	2nd	8th	—	—	
United States	R1	R1	R1	R2	R1	12th	7th	10th	—	—	—	10th	Q
West Indies	AQ										2nd	5th	Q
Asia
Afghanistan	Ineligible							—	5th	AQ	1st	AQ	
Bangladesh	R1	4th	R1	SF	R2	1st	AQ						
Hong Kong	—	R1	R1	R1	R2	8th	R1	—	—	3rd	10th	—	—
Malaysia	R1	R1	R1	R1	R1	16th	R1	—	—	—	—	—	—
Nepal	Ineligible					—	R1	—	—	9th	8th	8th	
Oman	Ineligible							9th	11th	—	—	6th	
Singapore	R1	R1	×	R1	19th	14th	R1	—	—	—	—	—	—
Sri Lanka	1st	AQ										1st	AQ
United Arab Emirates	Ineligible				1st	10th	5th	6th	7th	2nd	6th	9th	
East Asia - Pacific
Fiji	R1	R1	R1	R1	R1	11th	R1	—	—	—	—	—	—
Papua New Guinea	R1	3rd	R1	R2	R1	13th	R1	11th	—	4th	9th	—	
Europe
Denmark	SF	×	3rd	R2	R1	5th	6th	8th	12th	—	—	—	
France	Ineligible						R1	—	—	—	—	—	—
Germany	Ineligible						R1	—	—	—	—	—	—
Gibraltar	—	R1	R1	R1	20th	19th	R1	—	—	—	—	—	—
Ireland	Ineligible				R2	4th	8th	2nd	1st	AQ	5th	7th	Q
Israel	R1	R1	R1	R1	R1	22nd	R1	—	—	—	—	—	—
Italy	Ineligible					19th	×	—	—	—	—	—	
Netherlands	R1	R1	2nd	2nd	3rd	6th	1st	5th	3rd	7th	7th	2nd	Q
Scotland	Ineligible					3rd	4th	1st	6th	1st	4th	3rd	Q
Defunct teams
East Africa	R1	R1	R1	ICC membership ceased									
East and Central Africa	—	—	—	R1	18th	17th	R1	ICC membership ceased					
West Africa	—	R1	—	—	17th	18th	×	ICC membership ceased					
Wales	R1	Invited as a guest team for the 1979 tournament; never an ICC member											

== Tournament records ==
=== Team records ===
==== Highest innings totals ====
Score	Batting team	Opposition	Venue	Date	Scorecard
455/9 (60 overs)	Papua New Guinea	Gibraltar	Cannock & Rugeley Cricket Club, Cannock, England	18 June 1986	Scorecard
425/4 (60 overs)	Netherlands	Israel	Old Silhillians, Solihull, England	18 June 1986	Scorecard
408/6 (50 overs)	Zimbabwe	United States	Harare Sports Club, Zimbabwe	26 June 2023	Scorecard
407/8 (60 overs)	Bermuda	Hong Kong	Griff and Coton Ground, Nuneaton, England	13 June 1986	Scorecard
404/9 (60 overs)	United States	East and Central Africa	Sportpark de Dennen, Nijmegen, Netherlands	8 June 1990	Scorecard
Updated: 26 June 2023

==== Lowest innings totals ====
Score	Batting team	Opposition	Venue	Date	Scorecard
26 (15.2 overs)	East and Central Africa	Netherlands	Royal Military College, Kuala Lumpur, Malaysia	24 March 1997	Scorecard
32 (19 overs)	United States	Kenya	University of Malaya, Kuala Lumpur, Malaysia	30 March 1997	Scorecard
41 (20.4 overs)	Fiji	Scotland	Maple Leaf Cricket Club, King City, Canada	28 June 2001	Scorecard
41 (15.1 overs)	Oman	Papua New Guinea	Drummond Cricket Club, Limavady, Northern Ireland	5 July 2005	Scorecard
44 (27.1 overs)	Gibraltar	Kenya	Royal Military College, Kuala Lumpur, Malaysia	27 March 1997	Scorecard
Updated: 7 April 2023

=== Individual records ===
==== Most runs ====
Rank	Runs	Innings	Batsman	Team	Span
1	1,369	33	Khurram Khan	United Arab Emirates	2001–2014
2	1,173	24	Maurice Odumbe	Kenya	1990–1997
3	1,048	32	Steve Tikolo	Kenya	1994–2014
4	1,040	18	Nolan Clarke	Netherlands	1990–1994
5	916	18	Ed Joyce	Ireland	2001–2018
Updated: 7 April 2023

==== Highest individual score ====
Rank	Runs	Batsman	Batting team	Opposition	Venue	Date	Scorecard
1	175	Calum MacLeod	Scotland	Canada	Hagley Oval, Christchurch, New Zealand	23 January 2014	Scorecard
2	174	Sean Williams	Zimbabwe	United States	Harare Sports Club, Zimbabwe	26 June 2023	Scorecard
3	172	Simon Myles	Hong Kong	Gibraltar	High Town, Bridgnorth, England	11 June 1986	Scorecard
4	170*	David Hemp	Bermuda	Uganda	Senwes Park, Potchefstroom, South Africa	13 April 2009	Scorecard
5	169*	Rupert Gomes	Netherlands	Israel	ACC Ground, Amstelveen, Netherlands	4 June 1990	Scorecard
Updated: 26 June 2023

==== Most wickets ====
Rank	Wickets	Matches	Bowler	Team	T20I career span
1	71	43	Roland Lefebvre	Netherlands	1986–2001
2	63	26	Ole Mortensen	Denmark	1979–1994
3	50	27	John Blain	Scotland	1997–2009
4	48	30	Aasif Karim	Kenya	1986–1997
5	44	23	Pacer Edwards	Bermuda	1986–1994
Updated: 7 April 2023

==== Best bowling figures ====
Rank	Figures	Bowler	Bowling team	Opposition	Venue	Date	Scorecard
1	7/9 (7.2 overs)	Asim Khan	Netherlands	East and Central Africa	Royal Military College, Kuala Lumpur, Malaysia	24 March 1997	Scorecard
2	7/19 (8.4 overs)	Ole Mortensen	Denmark	Israel	Impala Sports Club, Nairobi, Kenya	24 February 1994	Scorecard
2	7/21 (8 overs)	Bhawan Singh	Canada	Namibia	Nairobi Club Ground, Nairobi, Kenya	14 February 1994	Scorecard
4	7/23 (9.2 overs)	Ashraful Haq	Bangladesh	Fiji	Water Orton, Birmingham, England	24 May 1979	Scorecard
5	6/11 (6.5 overs)	Bharat Gohel	Hong Kong	Fiji	Knowle and Dorridge Cricket Club, England	27 June 1986	Scorecard
Updated: 7 April 2023

=== By tournament ===
Year	Player of the final	Player of the tournament	Most runs	Most wickets
(England) 1979	—N/a	—N/a	(Sri Lanka) Duleep Mendis (221)	(Canada) John Vaughan (14)
(England) 1982	—N/a	—N/a	(Bermuda) Colin Blades (310)	(Bermuda) Elvin James (15)
(England) 1986	—N/a	—N/a	(Canada) Paul Prashad (533)	(Netherlands) Ronnie Elferink (23)
(Netherlands) 1990	(Zimbabwe) Andy Flower	—N/a	(Netherlands) Nolan Clarke (523)	(Zimbabwe) Eddo Brandes (18)
(United Arab Emirates) 1994	(United Arab Emirates) Mohammad Ishaq	—N/a	(Netherlands) Nolan Clarke (517)	(Papua New Guinea) Fred Arua (19) (Namibia) Gavin Murgatroyd (19)
(Malaysia) 1997	(Kenya) Steve Tikolo	(Kenya) Maurice Odumbe	(Kenya) Maurice Odumbe (517)	(Kenya) Aasif Karim (19) (Netherlands) Asim Khan (19) (Bangladesh) Mohammad Rafique (19)
(Canada) 2001	(Netherlands) Jacob-Jan Esmeijer	(Netherlands) Roland Lefebvre	(Namibia) Daniel Keulder (366)	(Netherlands) Roland Lefebvre (20) (Denmark) Søren Vestergaard (19)
(Ireland) 2005	(Scotland) Ryan Watson	(Netherlands) Bas Zuiderent	(Netherlands) Bas Zuiderent (474)	(Scotland) Paul Hoffmann (17) (Netherlands) Edgar Schiferli (17)
(South Africa) 2009	(Ireland) Trent Johnston	(Netherlands) Edgar Schiferli	(Bermuda) David Hemp (557)	(Netherlands) Edgar Schiferli (24)
(New Zealand) 2014	(Scotland) Preston Mommsen	(Scotland) Preston Mommsen	(United Arab Emirates) Khurram Khan (581)	(Hong Kong) Haseeb Amjad (20)
(Zimbabwe) 2018	(Afghanistan) Mohammad Shahzad	(Zimbabwe) Sikandar Raza	(Zimbabwe) Brendan Taylor (457)	(Afghanistan) Mujeeb Ur Rahman (16)
(Zimbabwe) 2023	(Sri Lanka) Dilshan Madushanka	(Zimbabwe) Sean Williams	(Zimbabwe) Sean Williams (600)	(Sri Lanka) Wanindu Hasaranga (22)

== See also ==
- ICC World Twenty20 Qualifier
