= Winston Trott =

Bermudian cricketer (born 1944)

Personal information
- Full name: Winston Herbert Trott
- Born: 10 August 1944 (age 82); Bermuda
- Batting: Right-handed
- Bowling: Left-arm medium-fast

International information
- National side: Bermuda

Domestic team information
- Years: Team
- 1971/72: Bermuda

Career statistics
Competition	First-class
Matches	1
Runs scored	33
Batting average	16.50
100s/50s	–/–
Top score	17
Balls bowled	168
Wickets	4
Bowling average	18.25
5 wickets in innings	–
10 wickets in match	–
Best bowling	4/73
Catches/stumpings	1/–
- Source: CricketArchive, 13 October 2011

Winston Trott (born 10 August 1944 in Bermuda) is a Bermudian former cricketer. He was a right-handed batsman and a left-arm medium-fast bowler. He played one first-class match for Bermuda, against New Zealand in 1972, taking four wickets in New Zealand's only innings. It was the maiden first-class match to be played by the Bermuda cricket team. He also represented Bermuda in the first two ICC Trophy tournaments.
