= John Vaughan (cricketer) =

Barbadian-born Canadian cricketer (born 1945)

Cricket information
- Batting: Right-handed
- Bowling: Right-arm medium-fast

International information
- National side: Canada (1979)
- ODI debut (cap 11): 9 June 1979 v Pakistan
- Last ODI: 16 June 1979 v Australia

Career statistics
Competition	ODI
Matches	3
Runs scored	30
Batting average	10.00
100s/50s	0/0
Top score	29
Balls bowled	11
Wickets	0
Bowling average	–
5 wickets in innings	–
10 wickets in match	–
Best bowling	–
Catches/stumpings	0/–
- Source: ESPNCricinfo, 17 September 2020

John Cecil Beaumont Vaughan (born June 8, 1945) is a Barbadian-born Canadian former cricketer. He played three One Day Internationals for Canada.
