= Duleep Mendis =

Former Sri Lankan cricketer

Deshamanya Duleep Mendis
Personal information
- Full name: Louis Rohan Duleep Mendis
- Born: 25 August 1952 (age 74); Moratuwa, Dominion of Ceylon
- Batting: Right-handed
- Bowling: Right-arm medium

International information
- National side: Sri Lanka (1975–1989)
- Test debut (cap 8): 17 February 1982 v England
- Last Test: 25 August 1988 v England
- ODI debut (cap 5): 7 June 1975 v West Indies
- Last ODI: 24 March 1989 v Pakistan

Career statistics
Competition	Test	ODI	FC	LA
Matches	24	79	121	110
Runs scored	1,329	1,527	6,233	2,467
Batting average	31.64	23.49	35.82	27.41
100s/50s	4/8	0/7	12/35	1/13
Top score	124	80	194	105*
Balls bowled	–	–	90	12
Wickets	–	–	1	0
Bowling average	–	–	52.00	–
5 wickets in innings	–	–	0	–
10 wickets in match	–	–	0	–
Best bowling	–	–	1/4	–
Catches/stumpings	9/0	14/0	49/1	24/0
- Source: ESPNcricinfo, 24 December 2014

Deshamanya Louis Rohan Duleep Mendis (born 25 August 1952), known as Duleep Mendis, is a Sri Lankan former cricketer and former captain of the team. Mendis captained Sri Lanka to their first Test series victory in 1985. He was primarily a specialist batsman, whose best performances came from 1982 to 1985.

He is currently the coach of the Oman national cricket team. He was awarded the Deshamanya (Sri Lanka's second-highest national honour) in 1996.

== Early years ==
He spent his college life at St. Sebastian's College, Moratuwa and S. Thomas' College, Mount Lavinia. Mendis also captained the Under 20 1st XI sides of both colleges.

== International career ==
Mendis made his debut for Sri Lanka in 1972, batting at number three against the visiting Tamil Nadu side. Mendis top-scored in the first innings with 52, and also made 34 in the second innings, but could not prevent an innings defeat. This match did not have international status, and indeed Mendis represented Sri Lanka in a number of non-internationals. His first ODI, however, came during the first Cricket World Cup in 1975, when he made 8 against the West Indies in a batting collapse. He was hit in the head by Jeff Thomson in a match versus Australia, and when able to speak again, told the Australians "I am going now", retiring hurt on 32. It took seven more years before Mendis got to play a Test match; on 17 February 1982 he joined forces with the other Sri Lankans against England. In that match, he was sent in to bat at number four, but only made 17 and 27 in Sri Lanka's seven-wicket defeat. More defeats followed, and in his first eight innings he only recorded one fifty, in the first Test of three against Pakistan.

However, on tour of India in the northern autumn of 1982 he showed his real skill. Sri Lanka had lost two early wickets for 11 runs, and Mendis was sent in to bat with Roy Dias. Their partnership was worth 153 runs, then a third-wicket record for Sri Lanka, and Mendis' maiden century helped Sri Lanka bat out the first day. Then, India amassed 566 for 6 before declaring, leaving Sri Lanka to try to save the draw. Again, the openers fell for single-digit scores, and again Mendis made 105 – which helped Sri Lanka bat until tea on the fifth day. Sri Lanka eventually drew the Test, their first drawn Test series in their history.

In the 1983 Cricket World Cup, Mendis recorded his third One Day International fifty (the previous two came in the 1979 World Cup and on tour to Pakistan in 1982). However, despite a respectable batting average of 25.33, Mendis' fortunes were the reverse of the Sri Lankan side. Sri Lanka lost the games in which he made reasonable scores, while Mendis made a duck in Sri Lanka's only win.

Mendis recorded a string of poor scores on New Zealand's tour of the island in 1984, only passing 20 once in six Test innings. By this time, however, he was established as the captain of the side, and still picked for the Test match in England that English summer. Mendis made his third Test century as Sri Lanka smashed 491 for 7 batting first amid the rain, and the first Test century by a Sri Lankan captain while in office. Sri Lanka drew that Test. A poor World Series Cup in 1984–85 followed, where Sri Lanka only won one out of ten ODIs, and Mendis was out in single figures four times.

Then came the 1985 Indian tour. Mendis led from the front, scoring three fifties and one series-saving century in the third Test, as India were defeated 1–0 in three Tests. After that tour, which also included a drawn ODI series, Mendis' career declined, and by the end of his career it was probably only his captaincy that kept him in. He made two Test fifties in his last ten Tests, and two ODI fifties in his last 32 ODIs following the India tour. Ranjan Madugalle replaced him as captain for the last Test that Mendis played, where he bowed out with a rearguard 56 that was, however, not to be good enough to save a draw. He remained within the Sri Lankan cricketing sphere, however, as he was manager of the successful 1996 Cricket World Cup side.

Later on he went on to coach the Oman cricket team and helped them qualify for their first 2016 World T20 in 2015.
