= 1983 Cricket World Cup squads =

This is a list of cricketers who represented their country at the 1983 Cricket World Cup in England which took place from 9 June 1983 to 25 June 1983. The oldest player to play at the 1983 Cricket World Cup was Somachandra De Silva (40/41) while the youngest player was Rumesh Ratnayake (19), both of Sri Lanka. The youngest in a 1983 World Cup squad (who did not play in any match, however) was Graeme Hick (17) of Zimbabwe.

== India ==
Manager: (India) P. R. Man Singh

Player	Date of Birth	Batting style	Bowling style	First Class team
Kapil Dev (c)	6 January 1959 (Age 24)	Right hand	Right arm fast-medium	(India) Haryana
Mohinder Amarnath (vc)	24 September 1950 (Age 33)	Right hand	Right arm medium	(India) Delhi
Kirti Azad	2 January 1959 (Age 24)	Right-hand	Right-arm off-spinner	(India) Delhi
Roger Binny	19 July 1955 (Age 28)	Right-hand	Right-arm fast-medium	(India) Karnataka
Sunil Gavaskar	10 July 1949 (Age 34)	Right hand	Right arm medium Right arm offbreak	(India) Mumbai
Syed Kirmani (wk)	29 December 1949 (Age 34)	Right-handed	Wicket-keeper	(India) Karnataka
Madan Lal	20 March 1951 (Age 32)	Right-hand	Right-arm medium	(India) Delhi
Sandeep Patil	18 August 1956 (Age 27)	Right-hand	Right-arm medium	(India) Mumbai
Balwinder Sandhu	3 August 1956 (Age 27)	Right-handed	Right arm medium-fast	(India) Mumbai
Yashpal Sharma	11 August 1954 (Age 29)	Right-handed	Right-arm medium	(India) Punjab
Ravi Shastri	27 May 1962 (Age 21)	Right-hand	Slow left-arm orthodox	(India) Mumbai
Krishnamachari Srikkanth	21 December 1959 (Age 24)	Right hand	Right-arm medium Right-arm offbreak	(India) Tamil Nadu
Sunil Valson	2 October 1958 (Age 25)	Right-hand	Left-arm medium	(India) Delhi
Dilip Vengsarkar	6 April 1956 (Age 27)	Right hand	Right arm medium	(India) Mumbai

=== Background ===
The Indian squad was announced in May 1983. The other probables considered were Gundappa Viswanath, Srinivasaraghavan Venkataraghavan, Maninder Singh, Ashok Malhotra, Surinder Amarnath, Anshuman Gaekwad, T. A. Sekhar. Sunil Valson was not in the original list of probables. The selection committee was headed by Ghulam Ahmed and had Chandu Borde, Chandu Sarwate, Bishan Singh Bedi and Pankaj Roy as the other members.

== Australia ==
Manager: (Australia) Phil Ridings

Player	Date of Birth	Batting style	Bowling style	First class team
Kim Hughes (c)	26 January 1954	Right hand	Right arm medium	Western Australia
Allan Border	27 July 1955	Left hand	Left arm orthodox spin	Queensland
Trevor Chappell	12 October 1952	Right hand	Right arm medium	New South Wales
Tom Hogan	23 September 1956	Right-hand	Slow left-arm orthodox	Western Australia
Rodney Hogg	5 March 1951	Right hand	Right hand fast	South Australia
David Hookes	3 May 1955	Left-handed	–	South Australia
Geoff Lawson	7 December 1957	Right-hand	Right-arm fast	New South Wales
Dennis Lillee	18 July 1949	Right-hand	Right-arm fast	Western Australia
Ken MacLeay	2 April 1959	Right-hand	Right-arm medium	Western Australia
Rod Marsh (wk)	4 November 1947	Left-handed	Wicket-keeper	Western Australia
Jeff Thomson	16 August 1950	Right-handed	Right arm fast	Queensland
Kepler Wessels	14 September 1957	Left-handed	Right arm off break	Queensland
Graeme Wood	6 November 1956	Left-handed	Right arm medium	Western Australia
Graham Yallop	7 October 1952	Left hand	Left-arm medium	Victoria

=== Background ===
Australia had won the triangular one day series at home over New Zealand and England during the 1982-83 summer. Kim Hughes had been in poor form for most of the summer but come good for the finals. The squad was picked in May. Greg Chappell was originally picked in the squad. Tom Hogan was selected over Bruce Yardley. Trevor Chappell was the biggest surprise for the squad, though Steve Smith had been a regular in Australia's one day team in the summer and he was overlooked. Later in the month Greg Chappell pulled out due to injury and Macleay replaced him.

== England ==
Manager: (England) Doug Insole

Player	Date of Birth	Batting style	Bowling style	First class team
Bob Willis (c)	30 May 1949	Right hand	Right arm fast	(England) Warwickshire
Paul Allott	14 September 1956	Right hand	Right arm fast-medium	(England) Lancashire
Ian Botham	24 November 1955	Right hand	Right arm fast-medium	(England) Somerset
Norman Cowans	17 April 1961	Right-hand	Right-arm fast	(England) Middlesex
Graham Dilley	18 May 1959	Left-handed	Right-arm fast	(England) Kent
Graeme Fowler	20 April 1957	Left-handed	Right-arm medium	(England) Lancashire
Mike Gatting	6 June 1957	Right hand	Right arm medium	(England) Middlesex
Ian Gould (wk)	19 August 1957	Left hand	Wicket-keeper	(England) Sussex
David Gower	1 April 1957	Left hand	Right arm off-break	(England) Leicestershire
Trevor Jesty	2 June 1948	Right-hand	Right-arm medium	(England) Hampshire
Allan Lamb	20 June 1954	Right-hand	Right-arm medium	(England) Northamptonshire
Vic Marks	25 June 1955	Right-handed	Right-arm off break	(England) Somerset
Derek Randall	24 February 1951	Right hand	Right arm medium	(England) Nottinghamshire
Chris Tavaré	27 October 1954	Right-hand	Right arm off break	(England) Kent

=== Background ===
Alan Butcher, David Bairstow, Eddie Hemmings, Phil Edmonds, Bob Taylor, David Mark Smith, Bill Athey, Wilf Slack, David Thomas were among the probables for the World Cup.

== New Zealand ==
Manager: (New Zealand) Allan Wright

Player	Date of Birth	Batting style	Bowling style	First class team
Geoff Howarth (c)	29 March 1951	Right hand	Right arm offbreak	(New Zealand) Auckland
John Bracewell	15 April 1958	Right-handed	Right arm off break	(New Zealand) Auckland
Lance Cairns	10 October 1949	Right hand	Right arm medium-fast	(New Zealand) Otago
Ewen Chatfield	3 July 1950	Right hand	Right arm medium-fast	(New Zealand) Wellington
Jeremy Coney	21 June 1952	Right hand	Right arm medium	(New Zealand) Wellington
Jeff Crowe	14 September 1958	Right-handed	Right arm, medium pace	(New Zealand) Auckland
Martin Crowe	22 September 1962	Right-hand	Right-arm medium	(New Zealand) Central Districts
Bruce Edgar	23 November 1956	Left hand	Wicket-keeper	(New Zealand) Wellington
Richard Hadlee	3 July 1951	Left hand	Right arm fast	(New Zealand) Canterbury
Warren Lees (wk)	19 March 1952	Right hand	Wicket-keeper	(New Zealand) Otago
Ian Smith (wk)	28 February 1957	Right-handed	Wicket-keeper	(New Zealand) Central Districts
Martin Snedden	23 November 1958	Left-hand	Right-arm medium-fast	(New Zealand) Auckland
Glenn Turner	26 May 1947	Right hand	Right arm offbreak	(New Zealand) Otago
John Wright	5 July 1954	Left hand	Right arm medium	(New Zealand) Northern Districts

=== Background ===
Trevor Franklin and Evan Gray travelled with the team, but were not considered for the World Cup.

== Pakistan ==
Manager: (Pakistan) Intikhab Alam

Player	Date of Birth	Batting style	Bowling style	First class team
Imran Khan (c)	25 November 1952	Right hand	Right arm fast	(Pakistan) PIA
Abdul Qadir	15 September 1955	Right-hand	Right-arm leg spin	(Pakistan) Habib Bank
Ijaz Faqih	24 March 1956	Right-hand	Right-arm offbreak	(Pakistan) MCB
Mansoor Akhtar	6 September 1962	Right-hand	Right-arm offspin	(Pakistan) United Bank
Mohsin Khan	15 March 1955	Right-hand	Right-arm medium pace	(Pakistan) Habib Bank
Mudassar Nazar	6 April 1956	Right hand	Right arm medium	(Pakistan) Lahore
Rashid Khan	15 December 1959	Right-hand	Right-arm fast-medium	(Pakistan) PIA
Sarfraz Nawaz	1 December 1948	Right hand	Right arm fast-medium	(Pakistan) Lahore
Shahid Mahboob	25 August 1962	Right-hand	Right-arm fast-medium	(Pakistan) Karachi
Tahir Naqqash	6 June 1959	Right-hand	Right-arm fast-medium	(Pakistan) Lahore
Wasim Bari (wk)	23 March 1948	Right hand	Wicket-keeper	(Pakistan) Karachi
Wasim Raja	3 July 1952	Left hand	Right arm legbreak	(Pakistan) Lahore
Zaheer Abbas	24 July 1947	Right hand	Right arm offbreak	(Pakistan) Karachi
Javed Miandad	12 June 1957	Right hand	Right arm legbreak	(Pakistan) Habib Bank

== Sri Lanka ==
Manager: (Sri Lanka) Tambyah Murugaser, Coach: Garfield Sobers

Player	Date of Birth	Batting style	Bowling style	First class team
Duleep Mendis (c)	25 August 1952	Right hand	–	(Sri Lanka) SSC
Guy de Alwis (wk)	15 February 1959	Right-hand	Wicket-keeper	(Sri Lanka) SSC
Ashantha de Mel	9 May 1959	Right-hand bat	Right-arm medium-fast	(Sri Lanka) –
Somachandra de Silva	11 June 1942	Right hand	Right arm legbreak	(Sri Lanka) BCAC
Roy Dias	18 October 1952	Right hand	Right-arm offbreak	(Sri Lanka) CCC
Vinothen John	27 May 1960	Right-hand	Right-arm medium-fast	(Sri Lanka) SCC
Brendon Kuruppu	5 January 1962	Right-handed	Wicket-keeper	(Sri Lanka) BRC
Ranjan Madugalle	22 April 1959	Right hand	Right-arm offbreak	(Sri Lanka) NCC
Arjuna Ranatunga	1 December 1963	Left-hand	Right-arm medium	(Sri Lanka) SCC
Rumesh Ratnayake	2 January 1964	Right-hand bat	Right-arm fast-medium	(Sri Lanka) NCC
Athula Samarasekera	5 August 1961	Right-hand bat	Right-arm medium	(Sri Lanka) CCC
Sidath Wettimuny	12 August 1956	Right hand	Right-arm medium	(Sri Lanka) –
Susil Fernando	19 December 1955	Right hand	-	(Sri Lanka) SLAFSC
Granville de Silva	12 March 1955	Right-hand bat	Right-arm medium	(Sri Lanka) –

== West Indies ==
Player	Date of Birth	Batting style	Bowling style	First class team
Clive Lloyd (c)	31 August 1944	left hand	Right-arm medium	Guyana
Faoud Bacchus	31 January 1954	Right-hand	Right-arm medium	Guyana
Wayne Daniel	16 January 1956	Right-hand	Right-arm fast	Barbados
Winston Davis	18 September 1958	Right-handed	Right-arm fast	(Saint Vincent and the Grenadines) Windward Islands
Jeff Dujon (wk)	28 May 1956	Right-hand	Wicket-keeper	Jamaica
Joel Garner	16 December 1952	Right hand	Right-arm fast	Barbados
Larry Gomes	13 July 1953	Left-hand	Right-arm offbreak	Trinidad and Tobago
Gordon Greenidge	1 May 1951	Right-hand	Right-arm medium/offbreak	Barbados
Desmond Haynes	15 February 1956	Right-hand	Right-arm legbreak/medium pace	Barbados
Michael Holding	16 February 1954	Right-hand	Right-arm fast	Jamaica
Gus Logie	28 September 1960	Right-hand	Right-arm off break	Trinidad and Tobago
Malcolm Marshall	18 April 1958	Right-hand	Right-arm fast	Barbados
Viv Richards	7 March 1952	Right-hand	Right-arm medium/offbreak	(Antigua and Barbuda) Leeward Islands
Andy Roberts	29 January 1951	Right-hand	Right-arm fast	(Antigua and Barbuda) Leeward Islands

=== Background ===
Milton Pydanna was on standby as wicket-keeper in case of any injury to Jeff Dujon.

== Zimbabwe ==
Manager: (Zimbabwe) David Ellman-Brown

Player	Date of Birth	Batting style	Bowling style
Duncan Fletcher (c)	27 September 1948	Left-hand	Right arm fast-medium
Robin Brown	11 March 1951	Right-hand	Right-arm medium
Iain Butchart	9 May 1960	Right-hand	Right-arm medium
Kevin Curran	7 September 1959	Right-handed	Right-arm fast medium
Jack Heron	8 November 1948	Right-hand	Right-arm medium
Graeme Hick	23 May 1966	Right hand	Right arm off break
Vince Hogg	3 July 1952	Right-hand	Right-arm medium-fast
David Houghton (wk)	23 June 1957	Right-hand	Right-arm off break
Grant Paterson	9 June 1960	Right-hand	Right-arm off-spin
Gerald Peckover	2 June 1955	Right-handed	–
Andrew Pycroft	6 June 1956	Right-hand	Right-arm offbreak
Peter Rawson	25 May 1957	Right-hand	Right-arm medium-fast
Ali Shah	7 August 1959	Left-hand	Right arm medium
John Traicos	17 May 1947	Right-hand	Right arm off-spin
