= 1987 Cricket World Cup squads =

This is a list of cricketers who represented their country at the 1987 Cricket World Cup in India and Pakistan which took place from 9 October 1987 to 8 November 1987. The oldest player at the 1987 Cricket World Cup was John Traicos (40) of Zimbabwe while the youngest player was Ijaz Ahmed (19) of Pakistan.

== Australia ==
Coach: (Australia) Bob Simpson

Player	Date of birth	Matches	Batting style	Bowling style	First class team
Allan Border (c)	27 July 1955	153	Left hand	Left arm orthodox spin	Queensland
David Boon	29 December 1960	40	Right hand	Right hand off-spin	Tasmania
Greg Dyer (wk)	16 March 1959	4	Right hand	Wicket-keeper	New South Wales
Dean Jones	24 March 1961	45	Right hand	Right arm off spin	Victoria
Geoff Marsh	31 December 1958	37	Right hand	Right arm off-spin	Western Australia
Tim May	26 January 1962	0	Right hand	Right-arm offbreak	South Australia
Craig McDermott	14 April 1965	39	Right hand	Right-arm fast	Queensland
Tom Moody	2 October 1965	0	Right hand	Right-arm medium	Western Australia
Simon O'Donnell	26 January 1963	37	Right hand	Right-arm fast-medium	Victoria
Bruce Reid	14 March 1963	33	Left hand	Left-arm fast-medium	Western Australia
Peter Taylor	22 August 1956	12	Left hand	Right-arm offbreak	New South Wales
Mike Veletta	30 October 1963	2	Right hand	-	Western Australia
Steve Waugh	2 June 1965	39	Right hand	Right-arm medium	New South Wales
Andrew Zesers	11 March 1967	0	Right hand	Right-arm medium-fast	South Australia

== England ==
- Coach: (England) Micky Stewart

Player	Date of birth	Batting style	Bowling style	First class team
Mike Gatting (c)	6 June 1957	Right hand	Right arm medium	(England) Middlesex
Bill Athey	27 September 1957	Right hand	Right arm medium	(England) Gloucestershire
Chris Broad	29 September 1957	Left hand	Right arm medium	(England) Nottinghamshire
Phillip DeFreitas	18 February 1966	Right hand	Right arm fast-medium	(England) Leicestershire
Paul Downton (wk)	4 April 1957	Right hand	Wicket-keeper	(England) Middlesex
John Emburey	20 August 1952	Right hand	Right arm off break	(England) Middlesex
Neil Foster	6 May 1962	Right-hand	Right-arm fast medium	(England) Essex
Graham Gooch	23 July 1953	Right hand	Right arm medium	(England) Essex
Eddie Hemmings	20 February 1949	Right hand	Right-arm offbreak	(England) Nottinghamshire
Allan Lamb	20 June 1954	Right-hand	Right-arm medium	(England) Northamptonshire
Derek Pringle	18 September 1958	Right hand	Right-arm medium	(England) Essex
Tim Robinson	21 November 1958	Right hand	Right-arm medium	(England) Nottinghamshire
Gladstone Small	18 October 1961	Right arm	Right arm fast-medium	(England) Warwickshire

== India ==
- Manager: (India) PR Man Singh

Player	Date of birth	Batting style	Bowling style	First class team
Kapil Dev (c)	6 January 1959	Right hand	Right arm fast-medium	(India) Haryana
Mohammad Azharuddin	8 February 1963	Right hand	Right-arm medium	(India) Hyderabad
Roger Binny	19 July 1955	Right hand	Right arm fast-medium	(India) Karnataka
Sunil Gavaskar	10 July 1949	Right hand	Right arm medium Right arm offbreak	(India) Bombay
Maninder Singh	13 June 1965	Right hand	Slow left-arm orthodox	(India) Delhi
Kiran More (wk)	4 September 1962	Right hand	Right arm leg spin Wicket-keeper	(India) Baroda
Chandrakant Pandit	30 September 1961	Right hand	Wicket-keeper	(India) Bombay
Manoj Prabhakar	15 April 1963	Right hand	Right-arm medium pace	(India) Delhi
Chetan Sharma	3 January 1966	Right hand	Right arm fast-medium	(India) Haryana
Ravi Shastri	27 May 1962	Right hand	Slow left-arm orthodox	(India) Bombay
Navjot Singh Sidhu	20 October 1963	Right hand	Right-arm medium	(India) Punjab
Laxman Sivaramakrishnan	31 December 1965	Right hand	Right-arm leg break Right-arm googly	(India) Tamil Nadu
Krishnamachari Srikkanth	21 December 1959	Right hand	Right-arm medium Right-arm offbreak	(India) Tamil Nadu
Dilip Vengsarkar (vc)	6 April 1956	Right hand	Right arm medium	(India) Bombay

== New Zealand ==
Player	Date of birth	Batting style	Bowling style	First class team
Jeff Crowe (c)	14 September 1958	Right-handed	Right arm, medium pace	(New Zealand) Auckland
Stephen Boock	20 September 1951	Right-hand	Slow left-arm orthodox	(New Zealand) Otago
John Bracewell	15 April 1958	Right-hand	Right arm off break	(New Zealand) Auckland
Ewen Chatfield	3 July 1950	Right hand	Right arm medium-fast	(New Zealand) Wellington
Martin Crowe	22 September 1962	Right-hand	Right-arm medium	(New Zealand) Central Districts
Phil Horne	21 January 1960	Left-hand	–	(New Zealand) Auckland
Andrew Jones	9 May 1959	Right-hand	Right-arm off-break	(New Zealand) Wellington
Danny Morrison	3 February 1966	Right-hand	Right-arm fast-medium	(New Zealand) Auckland
Dipak Patel	25 October 1958	Right-hand	Right-arm off-break	(New Zealand) Auckland
Ken Rutherford	26 October 1965	Right-hand	Right arm medium	(New Zealand) Otago
Ian Smith (wk)	28 February 1957	Right hand	Wicket-keeper	(New Zealand) Auckland
Martin Snedden	23 November 1958	Left-hand	Right-arm medium-fast	(New Zealand) Auckland
Willie Watson	31 August 1965	Right-hand	Right-arm fast-medium	(New Zealand) Auckland
John Wright	5 July 1954	Left hand	Right arm medium	(New Zealand) Northern Districts

== Pakistan ==
Player	Date of birth	Batting style	Bowling style	First class team
Imran Khan (c)	5 October 1952	Right hand	Right arm fast	(England) Sussex
Abdul Qadir	15 September 1955	Right-hand	Right-arm leg spin	(Pakistan) Habib Bank
Ijaz Ahmed	20 September 1968	Right-hand	Left-arm medium	(Pakistan) Habib Bank
Javed Miandad	12 June 1957	Right hand	Right arm legbreak	(Pakistan) Habib Bank
Mansoor Akhtar	6 September 1962	Right-hand	Right-arm offspin	(Pakistan) PAC
Manzoor Elahi	15 April 1963	Right-hand	Right-arm fast-medium	(Pakistan) Multan
Mudassar Nazar	6 April 1956	Right hand	Right arm medium	(Pakistan) Lahore
Rameez Raja	14 August 1962	Right hand	Right arm leg-break	(Pakistan) Lahore
Saleem Jaffar	19 November 1962	Right-hand	Left-arm fast-medium	(Pakistan) Karachi
Saleem Malik	16 April 1963	Right-hand	Right arm off break / slow-medium	(Pakistan) Lahore
Saleem Yousuf (wk)	7 December 1959	Right hand	Wicket-keeper	(Pakistan) Karachi
Shoaib Mohammad	8 January 1961	Right hand	Right arm offbreak	(Pakistan) Karachi
Tauseef Ahmed	10 May 1958	Right hand	Right arm offbreak	(Pakistan) Karachi
Wasim Akram	3 June 1966	Left hand	Left-arm fast	(Pakistan) Lahore

== Sri Lanka ==
Player	Date of birth	Batting style	Bowling style	First class team
Duleep Mendis (c)	25 August 1952	Right hand	–	(Sri Lanka) Sinhalese SC
Don Anurasiri	25 February 1966	Right-hand	Slow left-arm orthodox	(Sri Lanka) Panadura SC
Ashantha de Mel	9 May 1959	Right-hand bat	Right-arm medium-fast	(Sri Lanka) –
Aravinda de Silva	17 October 1965	Right hand	Right arm offbreak	(Sri Lanka) Nondescripts
Roy Dias	18 October 1952	Right hand	Right-arm offbreak	(Sri Lanka) Colombo CC
Asanka Gurusinha	16 September 1966	Left-hand	Right-arm medium	(Sri Lanka) Nondescripts
Sridharan Jeganathan	11 July 1951	Right hand	Slow left-arm orthodox	(Sri Lanka) Nondescripts
Vinothen John	27 May 1960	Right-hand	Right-arm medium-fast	(Sri Lanka) Moratuwa CC
Brendon Kuruppu (wk)	5 January 1962	Right-handed	Wicket-keeper	(Sri Lanka) Burgher RC
Ranjan Madugalle	22 April 1959	Right hand	Right-arm offbreak	(Sri Lanka) Nondescripts
Roshan Mahanama	31 May 1966	Right-hand	-	(Sri Lanka) Colombo CC
Arjuna Ranatunga	1 December 1963	Left-hand	Right-arm medium	(Sri Lanka) Sinhalese CC
Rumesh Ratnayake	2 January 1964	Right-hand bat	Right-arm fast-medium	(Sri Lanka) Nondescripts
Ravi Ratnayeke	2 May 1960	Left-handed	Right-arm fast medium	(Sri Lanka) Colombo CC

== (Cricket West Indies) West Indies ==
Player	Date of birth	Batting style	Bowling style	First class team
Viv Richards (c)	7 March 1952	Right-hand	Right-arm medium/offbreak	(Antigua and Barbuda) Leeward Islands
Eldine Baptiste	12 March 1960	Right hand	Right-arm fast-medium	(Antigua and Barbuda) Leeward Islands
Winston Benjamin	31 December 1964	Right hand	Right-arm fast	(Antigua and Barbuda) Leeward Islands
Carlisle Best	14 May 1959	Right hand	Right-arm off break/medium pace	Barbados
Jeff Dujon (wk)	28 May 1956	Right-hand	Wicket-keeper	Jamaica
Roger Harper	17 March 1963	Right hand	Right arm offbreak	Guyana
Desmond Haynes	15 February 1956	Right hand	Right-arm legbreak/medium pace	Barbados
Carl Hooper	15 December 1966	Right hand	Right arm offbreak	Guyana
Gus Logie	28 September 1960	Right-hand	Right-arm off break	Trinidad and Tobago
Patrick Patterson	15 September 1961	Right hand	Right arm fast	Jamaica
Richie Richardson	12 January 1962	Right-hand	Right-arm medium pace	(Antigua and Barbuda) Leeward Islands
Phil Simmons	18 April 1963	Right-hand	Right-arm medium	Trinidad and Tobago
Courtney Walsh	30 October 1962	Right hand	Right-arm fast	Jamaica

== Zimbabwe ==
Player	Date of birth	Batting style	Bowling style
John Traicos (c)	17 May 1947	Right-hand	Right arm off-spin
Kevin Arnott	8 March 1961	Right-hand	-
Eddo Brandes	5 March 1963	Right-hand	Right arm fast
Robin Brown	11 March 1951	Right-hand	Right-arm medium
Iain Butchart	9 May 1960	Right-hand	Right-arm medium
Kevin Curran	7 September 1959	Right-handed	Right-arm fast medium
David Houghton (wk)	23 June 1957	Right-hand	Right-arm off break
Malcolm Jarvis	6 December 1955	Right hand	Left-arm medium fast
Babu Meman	26 June 1952	Right-hand	Right-arm offbreak
Grant Paterson	9 June 1960	Right-hand	Right-arm off-spin
Andrew Pycroft	6 June 1956	Right-hand	Right-arm offbreak
Peter Rawson	25 May 1957	Right-hand	Right-arm medium-fast
Ali Shah	7 August 1959	Left-hand	Right arm medium
Andy Waller	25 September 1959	Right hand	Right-arm medium

== See also ==
- 1987 Cricket World Cup Final
