= 1992 Cricket World Cup squads =

This is a list of the final 14 man squads named for the 1992 Cricket World Cup held in Australia and New Zealand which took place from 22 February 1992 to 25 March 1992. The oldest player at the 1992 Cricket World Cup was John Traicos (44) of Zimbabwe while the youngest player was Zahid Fazal (18) of Pakistan.

== Australia ==
Australia
Australia 1992 World Cup Kit

Coach: (Australia) : Bob Simpson

Player	Date of birth	Matches	Batting style	Bowling style	First-class team
Allan Border (c)	27 July 1955	234	Left hand	Left arm orthodox spin	Queensland
David Boon	29 December 1960	115	Right hand	Right hand off-spin	Tasmania
Ian Healy (wk)	30 April 1964	64	Right hand	Wicket-keeper	Queensland
Merv Hughes	23 November 1961	24	Right hand	Right-arm fast	Victoria
Dean Jones	24 March 1961	125	Right hand	Right arm off-spin	Victoria
Craig McDermott	14 April 1965	81	Right hand	Right-arm fast	Queensland
Geoff Marsh	31 December 1958	113	Right hand	Right arm off-spin	Western Australia
Tom Moody	2 October 1965	24	Right hand	Right-arm medium	Western Australia
Bruce Reid	14 March 1963	56	Left hand	Left-arm fast-medium	Western Australia
Mark Taylor	27 October 1964	20	Left hand	Right-arm medium	New South Wales
Peter Taylor	22 August 1956	77	Left hand	Right-arm offbreak	Queensland
Mark Waugh	2 June 1965	29	Right hand	Right-arm medium Right-arm off-break	New South Wales
Steve Waugh	2 June 1965	122	Right hand	Right-arm medium	New South Wales
Mike Whitney	24 February 1959	22	Right hand	Left-arm fast	New South Wales

== England ==
England
England 1992 World Cup Kit

Coach: (England) Micky Stewart

Player	Date of birth	Matches	Batting style	Bowling style	First-class team
Graham Gooch (c)	23 July 1953	100	Right hand	Right arm medium	(England) Essex
Ian Botham	24 November 1955	102	Right hand	Right arm fast-medium	(England) Durham
Phillip DeFreitas	18 February 1966	64	Right hand	Right arm fast-medium	(England) Lancashire
Neil Fairbrother	9 September 1963	16	Left hand	Left-arm medium	(England) Lancashire
Graeme Hick	23 May 1966	7	Right hand	Right arm off-break	(England) Worcestershire
Richard Illingworth	23 August 1963	5	Right hand	Slow left-arm orthodox	(England) Worcestershire
Allan Lamb	20 June 1954	113	Right hand	Right arm medium	(England) Northamptonshire
Chris Lewis	14 February 1968	18	Right hand	Right arm fast-medium	(England) Nottinghamshire
Derek Pringle	18 September 1958	33	Right hand	Right arm medium	(England) Essex
Dermot Reeve	2 April 1963	5	Right hand	Right-arm medium	(England) Warwickshire
Gladstone Small	18 October 1961	47	Right hand	Right arm fast-medium	(England) Warwickshire
Robin Smith	13 September 1963	35	Right hand	Right arm leg-break	(England) Hampshire
Alec Stewart (wk)	8 April 1963	27	Right hand	Right-arm medium Wicket-keeper	(England) Surrey
Phil Tufnell	29 April 1966	12	Right hand	Slow left-arm orthodox	(England) Middlesex

== India ==
India
India 1992 World Cup Kit

Coach: (India) Abbas Ali Baig

Player	Date of birth	Matches	Batting style	Bowling style	First-class team
Mohammad Azharuddin (c)	8 February 1963	130	Right hand	Right-arm medium	(India) Hyderabad
Subroto Banerjee	13 February 1969	3	Right hand	Right-arm medium-fast	(India) Bihar
Sachin Tendulkar	24 April 1973	32	Right hand	Right-arm medium Right-arm leg break Right-arm leg-break	(India) Bombay
Ajay Jadeja	1 February 1971	0	Right hand	Right-arm medium	(India) Haryana
Vinod Kambli	18 January 1972	6	Left hand	Right-arm off-break	(India) Bombay
Kapil Dev	6 January 1959	182	Right hand	Right-arm fast-medium	(India) Haryana
Ravi Shastri (vc)	27 May 1962	144	Right hand	Slow left-arm orthodox	(India) Bombay
Sanjay Manjrekar	12 July 1965	37	Right hand	Right arm off-spin	(India) Bombay
Kiran More (wk)	4 September 1962	78	Right hand	Wicket-keeper	(India) Baroda
Manoj Prabhakar	15 April 1963	68	Right hand	Right-arm medium pace	(India) Delhi
Venkatapathy Raju	9 July 1969	16	Right hand	Slow left-arm orthodox	(India) Hyderabad
Krishnamachari Srikkanth	21 December 1959	139	Right hand	Right-arm medium Right-arm offbreak	(India) Tamil Nadu
Javagal Srinath	31 August 1969	17	Right hand	Right arm fast	(India) Karnataka
Pravin Amre	14 August 1968	12	Right hand	Right-arm leg break	(India) Bengal

== New Zealand ==
New Zealand
New Zealand 1994 World Cup Kit

Coach: (New Zealand) Warren Lees

Player	Date of birth	Matches	Batting style	Bowling style	First-class team
Martin Crowe (c)	22 September 1962	114	Right hand	Right arm, medium pace	(New Zealand) Wellington
Chris Cairns	13 June 1970	6	Right hand	Right arm fast-medium	(New Zealand) Canterbury
Mark Greatbatch	11 December 1963	40	Left-hand	Right-arm medium	(New Zealand) Central Districts
Chris Harris	20 November 1969	17	Left hand	Right arm medium	(New Zealand) Canterbury
Andrew Jones	9 May 1959	55	Right hand	Right-arm off-break	(New Zealand) Otago
Gavin Larsen	27 September 1962	17	Right hand	Right arm medium	(New Zealand) Wellington
John Wright	5 July 1954	144	Left hand	Right arm medium-fast	(New Zealand) Auckland
Rodney Latham	12 June 1961	12	Right hand	Right arm medium	(New Zealand) Canterbury
Danny Morrison	3 February 1966	41	Right hand	Right-arm fast-medium	(New Zealand) Auckland
Dipak Patel	25 October 1958	25	Right-hand	Right arm off-break	(New Zealand) Auckland
Ken Rutherford	26 October 1965	64	Right hand	Right hand medium	(New Zealand) Otago
Ian Smith (wk)	28 February 1957	90	Right hand	Wicket-keeper	(New Zealand) Auckland
Murphy Su'a	7 November 1966	2	Left hand	Left-arm fast-medium	(New Zealand) Auckland
Willie Watson	31 August 1965	47	Right hand	Right arm fast-medium	(New Zealand) Auckland

== Pakistan ==
Pakistan
Pakistan 1992 World Cup Kit

Coach: (Pakistan) Intikhab Alam

Player	Date of birth	Matches	Batting style	Bowling style	First-class team
Imran Khan (c)	25 November 1952	167	Right hand	Right arm fast	n/a
Aamir Sohail	14 September 1966	5	Left hand	Slow left-arm orthodox	(Pakistan) Habib Bank
Aaqib Javed	5 August 1972	48	Right hand	Right-arm fast-medium	(Pakistan) PAC
Ijaz Ahmed	20 September 1968	93	Right hand	Left-arm medium	(Pakistan) Habib Bank
Inzamam-ul-Haq	3 March 1970	7	Right hand	Slow left-arm orthodox	(Pakistan) Multan
Iqbal Sikander	19 December 1958	0	Right hand	Right-arm leg-break Right-arm googly	(Pakistan) Karachi
Javed Miandad	12 June 1957	185	Right hand	Right-arm legbreak	(Pakistan) Habib Bank
Moin Khan (wk)	23 September 1971	14	Right hand	Wicket-keeper Right-arm off-break	(Pakistan) Karachi
Mushtaq Ahmed	28 June 1970	34	Right hand	Right arm leg-break	(Pakistan) Multan
Rameez Raja	14 August 1962	120	Right hand	Right arm leg-break	(Pakistan) Lahore
Saleem Malik	16 April 1963	138	Right hand	Right arm off-break Slow right-arm medium	(Pakistan) Habib Bank
Wasim Akram	3 June 1966	112	Left hand	Left-arm fast	(Pakistan) PIA
Wasim Haider	6 June 1967	0	Right hand	Fast right-arm medium	(Pakistan) Faisalabad
Zahid Fazal	10 November 1973	10	Right hand	Right arm medium Right arm off-break	(Pakistan) PIA

== South Africa ==
South Africa
South Africa 1992 World Cup Kit

Coach: (South Africa) Mike Procter

Player	Date of birth	Matches	Batting style	Bowling style	First-class team
Kepler Wessels (c)	14 September 1957	3	Left hand	Right arm off-break Right arm medium	(South Africa) Eastern Province
Tertius Bosch	14 March 1960	0	Right hand	Right arm fast	(South Africa) Northern Transvaal
Hansie Cronje	25 September 1969	0	Right hand	Right arm medium	(South Africa) Orange Free State
Allan Donald	20 October 1966	3	Right hand	Right arm fast	(England) Warwickshire
Omar Henry	23 January 1952	0	Left hand	Slow left-arm orthodox	(South Africa) Orange Free State
Andrew Hudson	17 March 1965	2	Right hand	Right-arm medium	(South Africa) Natal
Peter Kirsten	14 May 1955	3	Right hand	Right-arm offbreak	(South Africa) Border
Adrian Kuiper	24 August 1959	3	Right hand	Right-arm medium Right-arm offbreak	(South Africa) Western Province
Brian McMillan	22 December 1963	2	Right hand	Right-arm medium-fast	(South Africa) Western Province
Meyrick Pringle	22 June 1966	0	Right hand	Right-arm fast-medium	(South Africa) Western Province
Jonty Rhodes	27 July 1969	0	Right hand	Right-arm medium	(South Africa) Natal
Dave Richardson (wk)	16 September 1959	3	Right hand	Wicket-keeper	(South Africa) Eastern Province
Mark Rushmere	7 January 1965	0	Right hand	Right-arm medium	(South Africa) Eastern Province
Richard Snell	12 September 1968	3	Right hand	Right-arm fast-medium	(South Africa) Transvaal

== Sri Lanka ==
Sri Lanka
Sri Lanka 1992 World Cup Kit

Coach: (Sri Lanka) Chandika Hathurusingha

Players	Date of birth	Matches	Batting style	Bowling style	First-class team
Aravinda de Silva (c)	17 October 1965	92	Right hand	Right-arm off-break	(Sri Lanka) Nondescripts
Don Anurasiri	25 February 1966	29	Right hand	Slow left-arm orthodox	(Sri Lanka) Panadura SC
Asanka Gurusinha	16 September 1966	61	Left-hand	Right-arm medium	(Sri Lanka) Nondescripts
Chandika Hathurusingha	13 September 1968	4	Right-handed	Right-arm medium-fast	(Sri Lanka) Tamil Union
Sanath Jayasuriya	30 June 1969	20	Left hand	Slow left arm orthodox	(Sri Lanka) Bloomfield
Ruwan Kalpage	19 February 1970	2	Left hand	Right-arm offbreak	(Sri Lanka) Nondescripts
Roshan Mahanama	31 May 1966	58	Right-hand	-	(Sri Lanka) Colombo CC
Champaka Ramanayake	8 January 1965	30	Right hand	Right-arm fast-medium	(Sri Lanka) Tamil Union C&A
Arjuna Ranatunga	1 December 1963	99	Left-hand	Right-hand medium	(Sri Lanka) Sinhalese SC
Graeme Labrooy	7 June 1964	43	Right hand	Right-arm fast-medium	(Sri Lanka) Basnahira North
Athula Samarasekera	5 August 1961	31	Right hand	Right-arm medium	(Sri Lanka) Colombo CC
Hashan Tillakaratne (wk)	14 July 1967	41	Left hand	Wicket-keeper	(Sri Lanka) Nondescripts
Pramodya Wickramasinghe	14 August 1971	4	Right hand	Right-arm fast	(Sri Lanka) Sinhalese SC
Kapila Wijegunawardene	23 November 1964	23	Right hand	Right-arm fast-medium	(Sri Lanka) Colombo CC

== West Indies ==
West Indies
West Indies 1992 World Cup Kit

- Coach: (Cricket West Indies) Rohan Kanhai

Player	Date of birth	Matches	Batting style	Bowling style	First-class team
Richie Richardson (c)	12 January 1962	152	Right hand	Right-arm medium-pace	(Antigua and Barbuda) Leeward Islands
Curtly Ambrose	21 September 1963	61	Left hand	Right-arm fast	(Antigua and Barbuda) Leeward Islands
Keith Arthurton	21 February 1965	26	Left hand	Slow left-arm orthodox leg break	(Antigua and Barbuda) Leeward Islands
Winston Benjamin	31 December 1964	49	Right hand	Right-arm fast	(Antigua and Barbuda) Leeward Islands
Anderson Cummins	7 May 1966	10	Right hand	Right-arm fast	Jamaica
Roger Harper	17 March 1963	66	Right hand	Right-arm off break	Guyana
Desmond Haynes	15 February 1956	193	Right hand	Right-arm legbreak/medium pace	Barbados
Carl Hooper	15 December 1966	71	Right hand	Right-arm off break	Guyana
Brian Lara	2 May 1969	16	Left hand	Right-arm leg break	Trinidad and Tobago
Gus Logie	28 September 1960	130	Right hand	Right-arm off break	Trinidad and Tobago
Malcolm Marshall	18 April 1958	131	Right hand	Right-arm fast	Barbados
Patrick Patterson	15 September 1961	49	Right hand	Right-arm fast	Jamaica
Phil Simmons	18 April 1963	36	Right hand	Right-arm medium	Trinidad and Tobago
David Williams (wk)	4 November 1963	17	Right hand	Wicket-keeper/Right-arm legbreak	Trinidad and Tobago

== Zimbabwe ==
Zimbabwe
Zimbabwe 1992 World Cup Kit

Coach: (England) Don Topley

Player	Date of birth	Matches	Batting style	Bowling style
David Houghton (c)	23 June 1957	12	Right-hand	Right-arm off break
Kevin Arnott	8 March 1961	4	Right-hand	-
Eddo Brandes	5 March 1963	4	Right-hand	Right arm fast
Mark Burmester	24 January 1968	0	Right-hand	Right-arm medium
Iain Butchart	9 May 1960	12	Right-hand	Right-arm medium
Alistair Campbell	23 September 1972	0	Left-hand	Right-arm off break
Andy Flower (wk)	28 April 1968	0	Left-hand	Wicket-keeper Right-arm off break
Kevin Duers	30 June 1960	0	Right hand	Right-arm medium-fast
Wayne James	27 August 1965	0	Right hand	-
Malcolm Jarvis	6 December 1955	5	Right hand	Left-arm medium fast
Ali Shah	7 August 1959	9	Left-hand	Right arm medium
Andrew Pycroft	6 June 1956	12	Right-hand	Right-arm offbreak
John Traicos	17 May 1947	12	Right-hand	Right arm off-spin
Andy Waller	25 September 1959	6	Right hand	Right-arm medium
