= Indian cricket team in Zimbabwe in 1992–93 =

International cricket tour

	India	Zimbabwe
- Dates: 15 October 1992 – 25 October 1992
Captains	Mohammad Azharuddin	Dave Houghton

Test series
- Result: 1-match series drawn 0–0
Most runs	Sanjay Manjrekar (104)	Dave Houghton (162)
Most wickets	Manoj Prabhakar (4)	John Traicos (5)

One Day International series
- Results: India won the 1-match series 1–0
Most runs	Sanjay Manjrekar (70)	Andy Flower (62)
Most wickets	Javagal Srinath (3)	Gary Crocker (4)

The Indian cricket team toured Zimbabwe between 15 and 25 October 1992. The series was played as a prelude for India's tour of South Africa, and included just one Test match and one One Day International (ODI).

The tour began with a 50-over warm-up match, which the touring Indians won by 16 runs over the "Zimbabwe Cricket Union President's XI". Wisden Cricketers' Almanack criticised the "lifeless pitch" in the Test match, saying "both [bowling] attacks were rendered innocuous". Zimbabwe's captain, David Houghton top-scored for his side in their first innings, scoring the country's maiden Test century of 121. Zimbabwe established a 149-run first innings lead, but the match ended as a draw. By drawing the match, Zimbabwe became the first team to avoid defeat in their inaugural Test match since Australia won the very first Test match in 1877. In the solitary ODI, India won by 30 runs.

Following the series, India travelled to South Africa, becoming the first team to tour the country for 23 years after an international boycott due to the country's apartheid policies, while Zimbabwe hosted New Zealand. Zimbabwe achieved their first victory in Test cricket the following summer, when they beat the touring Pakistan team.

== Tour matches ==
=== 50 overs: Zimbabwe Cricket Union President's XI v Indians ===
15 October 1992
Scorecard

Indians; 203/9 (50 overs)	v	Zimbabwe Cricket Union President's XI; 187/9 (50 overs)
Ravi Shastri 73 (125); Gary Crocker 3/18 (10 overs)		Gavin Briant 51*; Ravi Shastri 2/21 (10 overs)

Indians won by 16 runs
Old Georgians Sports Club, Harare
Umpires: Eldon Gilmour (Zim) and Russell Tiffin (Zim)

- Zimbabwe Cricket Union President's XI won the toss and elected to field.

The Indians were reduced to 76/5 after being put in to bat first, losing Mohammad Azharuddin, Sachin Tendulkar and Sanjay Manjrekar cheaply. Vice-captain Ravi Shastri then joined by Pravin Amre put together 47 runs for the sixth wicket helping their team go past 200. Shastri also shone with the ball returning figures of 2/21 in his ten overs restricting Zimbabwe Cricket Union President's XI 17 short of the target. For the latter, Gavin Briant remained unbeaten on 51.

== Test series ==
=== Only Test ===
18–22 October 1992
Scorecard

Zimbabwe	v	India
456 (214.2 overs); David Houghton 121 (322); Manoj Prabhakar 3/66 (45 overs)		307 (169.4 overs); Sanjay Manjrekar 104 (422); John Traicos 5/86 (50 overs)
146/4 (66 overs); Andy Pycroft 46 (99); Kapil Dev 2/22 (15 overs)

Match drawn
Harare Sports Club, Harare
Umpires: Dickie Bird (Eng), Kantilal Kanjee (Zim) and Ian Robinson (Zim)

- Zimbabwe won the toss and elected to bat.

This was the first Test match to have three appointed umpires. British company National Grid sponsored English umpire Dickie Bird so that he could fly to Zimbabwe for the match, the 48th Test match he had umpired. This equalled the world record for the most Test matches umpired. As a result, Bird umpired the whole match while the two Zimbabwean umpires present, Kantilal Kanjee and Ian Robinson, took to the field on alternate days. Because this was Zimbabwe's first ever Test match, ten of their eleven players were making their Test debut. The eleventh player, John Traicos, had previously played for South Africa before they were excluded from Test cricket in 1970. He was the 14th cricketer to play Test cricket for two different countries, and he broke the record for the longest period between Test appearances: 22 years and 222 days.

Zimbabwe won the toss and elected to bat first, and India struggled to bowl for the first two days, lacking match practice and still adjusting to the altitude in Harare. Kevin Arnott and Grant Flower opened the batting for Zimbabwe with a 100-run partnership, though both batted cautiously and slowly. India took three wickets on the first day to leave Zimbabwe at 3/188 at stumps. A wicket fell early on the second day to bring David Houghton to the crease. Though Houghton, a mainstay in Zimbabwe's team, was known for aggressive batting, he curbed his instincts to score a slow maiden Test century. He reached his hundred after 305 minutes of batting, and he batted in total for 414 minutes, playing India's spin bowlers especially well. Houghton was the first player to score a century his country's inaugural Test match since Charles Bannerman did for Australia in 1877. Houghton and Andy Flower scored 165 runs in 68 overs for the sixth wicket, which took Zimbabwe to stumps on the second day, but all five remaining wickets fell quickly on the morning of the third day. Zimbabwe's first innings total was 456 all out, which easily beat 245 (scored by Australia in their first Test match) to become the highest ever score by a team in their inaugural Test match.

The only fast bowler in Zimbabwe's team was Eddo Brandes, who opened the bowling when Zimbabwe took to the field, but broke down after two overs and didn't take any further part in the match. Regardless, Zimbabwe's other bowlers excelled, particularly John Traicos and Gary Crocker. Traicos dismissed Sachin Tendulkar caught and bowled for a duck then had India's captain Mohammad Azharuddin caught at slip for nine, while Crocker only conceded 11 runs in his first 13 overs, nine of which were maiden overs. India were reduced to 4/93 at stumps, still needing to score another 164 runs to avoid the follow-on.

Traicos took three more wickets on day four to claim a five-wicket haul. He took five wickets for 86 runs in 50 overs, the best bowling figures of the match, but Zimbabwe lost the initiative when they decided to take a new ball, switching from Traicos to their seam bowlers. This change suited the Indian batsmen, Kapil Dev and Sanjay Manjrekar. Kapil Dev scored 60 runs and Manjrekar scored a century. Manjrekar's century was the fifth slowest Test century, and the slowest ever by an Indian batsman. It took him 500 minutes of batting, and he had faced 397 balls. Manjrekar reached his century just before stumps on the fourth day, and India finished the day with 7/278.

Manjrekar was caught at backward point early on day five, and India were all out for 307 just 45 minutes later. As there was not enough time left for a result either, Zimbabwe slowly batted out a draw. In so doing, Zimbabwe became the first team to avoid losing their first Test match since Australia in 1876/77, when the first Test match was played.

== ODI series ==
=== Only ODI ===
25 October 1992
Scorecard

India; 239 (49.4 overs)	v	Zimbabwe; 209 (49.1 overs)
Sanjay Manjrekar 70 (70); Gary Crocker 4/26 (7.4 overs)		Andy Flower 62 (104); Javagal Srinath 3/35 (10 overs)

India won by 30 runs
Harare Sports Club, Harare
Umpires: Ian Robinson and Russell Tiffin
Player of the match: Sanjay Manjrekar (Ind)

- Zimbabwe won the toss and elected to field.
- David Brain, Gary Crocker, Craig Evans and Grant Flower (all Zim) made their ODI debuts.

The match was played in front of a crowd of 8,000, and Zimbabwe won the toss and elected to field. After India lost both of their opening batsmen with only one run scored, their innings was built around Sanjay Manjrekar, who top-scored for India with 70 runs. This lifted India to 239 all out. The Flower brothers (Andy and Grant) opened the batting for Zimbabwe and got them off to a good start, but after the middle order collapsed only Gary Crocker showed any resistance against the Indian bowlers. Zimbabwe were bowled out for 209 and lost by 30 runs.
