= Sri Lankan cricket team in Zimbabwe in 1982–83 =

The Sri Lankan national cricket team toured Zimbabwe in October 1982 and played two first-class matches against the Zimbabwean national cricket team before Zimbabwe was elevated to Test status. In addition, the teams played a two-match series of Limited Overs Internationals (LOI). Sri Lanka were captained by Duleep Mendis and Zimbabwe by John Traicos.

== Limited overs series ==
1st Limited Overs Match

30 October 1982
(50-over match)
Scorecard

Zimbabwe; 196/6 (50 overs)	v	Sri Lanka; 197/7 (45.5 overs)
Kevin Curran 59; Rumesh Ratnayake 2/38 (10 overs)		Duleep Mendis 53; Vince Hogg 2/29 (10 overs)

Sri Lanka won by 3 wickets
Harare Sports Club, Harare
Player of the match: Kevin Curran (ZIM)

- Zimbabwe elected to bat first

2nd Limited Overs Match

31 October 1982
(50-over match)
Scorecard

Sri Lanka; 161 (49 overs)	v	Zimbabwe; 162/4 (43 overs)
Sidath Wettimuny 42; Duncan Fletcher 3/24 (8 overs)		Duncan Fletcher 60*; Vinothen John 3/22 (10 overs)

Zimbabwe won by 6 wickets
Harare Sports Club, Harare
Player of the match: Duncan Fletcher (ZIM)

- Zimbabwe elected to field first

== 4-day match series ==
=== 1st match ===
5–8 November 1982
(4-day match)
Scorecard

Zimbabwe	v	Sri Lanka
416 (131 overs); Andy Pycroft 128 (249); Rumesh Ratnayake 4/79 (29 overs)		335 (100.4 overs); Roy Dias 85 (96); Peter Rawson 6/82 (27.4 overs)
221/6d (59.5 overs); Andy Pycroft 81 (100); Vinothen John 2/29 (8 overs)		126/2 (44 overs); Roy Dias 61 (80); Peter Rawson 1/11 (9 overs)

Match drawn
Queens Sports Club, Bulawayo
Umpires: Patrick Latham
Player of the match: Andy Pycroft (ZIM)

- Zimbabwe elected to bat first

=== 2nd match ===
12–14 November 1982
(4-day match)
Scorecard

Zimbabwe	v	Sri Lanka
365 (105.3 overs); Andy Pycroft 96 (187); Somachandra De Silva 4/145 (35 overs)		104 (29.1 overs); Ravi Ratnayeke 20 (20); Kevin Curran 4/24 (7.1 overs)
		221 (77.2 overs); Duleep Mendis 67 (87); Vince Hogg 6/26 (15 overs)

Zimbabwe won by an innings and 40 runs
Harare Sports Club, Harare

- Zimbabwe elected to bat first
