= 1992 World Cup final =

1992 World Cup final may refer to:

- 1992 Cricket World Cup final
- 1992 Rugby League World Cup final
