= Ozias Bvute =

Zimbabwean cricket administrator

Ozias Bvute is the managing director and chief executive of Zimbabwe Cricket.

He replaced Vincent Hogg as chief executive in 2005. Hogg's departure came against the background of the player standoffs, with the senior and mostly white players taking the board to task over issues of administration.

Joining the organization at a tumultuous time, Bvute's overriding mandate would be to integrate cricket into a truly national sport. He was Chairman of the Integration Task Force that was set up in 2001 to develop a comprehensive plan that ensures full and equitable nationwide integration of Zimbabwean cricket in the shortest possible time with the least possible reduction in individual and team performance.

Many of the measures taken by the integration committee were misunderstood to be the introduction of a quota system and culminated in 15 players resigning from the national team saying that the selection process was unfair.

Despite this disruption, under Bvute, Zimbabwe continued to field a national team and fulfill its International Cricket Council obligations as one of the 10 full members of the organization.

In 2006, together with Peter Chingoka, the Chairman of Zimbabwe Cricket, Bvute lobbied for the voluntary temporary withdrawal of Zimbabwe from playing Test cricket. Until such a time as the senior players had gained enough experience in playing the longer version, the senior men's team would concentrate on fulfilling its ODI obligations under the ICC Future Tours Programme.

Today, Bvute is spearheading the implementation of franchise cricket in Zimbabwe.

He was elected to the National Assembly of Zimbabwe in the 2018 Zimbabwean general election and re-elected in 2023 from the ZANU–PF in Goromonzi North constituency.He has done a lot of work with the people of Goromonzi from philanthropy to employment creation in his community.
