= Tinashe Kamunhukamwe =

Zimbabwean cricketer (born 1995)

Personal information
- Full name: Tinashe Stephen Kamunhukamwe
- Born: 10 July 1995 (age 31); Chitungwiza, Zimbabwe
- Batting: Right-handed
- Bowling: Right-arm offbreak
- Role: Batsman

International information
- National side: Zimbabwe (2018–2024)
- ODI debut (cap 138): 20 July 2018 v Pakistan
- Last ODI: 8 January 2024 v Sri Lanka
- T20I debut (cap 58): 9 March 2020 v Bangladesh
- Last T20I: 18 January 2024 v Sri Lanka

Career statistics
Competition	ODI	T20I	FC	LA
Matches	12	15	45	63
Runs scored	131	304	2021	2060
Batting average	10.91	20.26	28.06	34.33
100s/50s	0/1	0/0	3/10	1/18
Top score	51	44	159	128
Balls bowled	0	0	54	0
Wickets	0	0	1	0
Bowling average	–	–	23.00	–
5 wickets in innings	0	0	0	0
10 wickets in match	–	–	0	–
Best bowling	–	–	1/2	–
Catches/stumpings	1/–	1/–	25/–	23/–
- Source: Cricinfo, 12 April 2025

Tinashe Kamunhukamwe (born 10 July 1995) is a Zimbabwean cricketer. He made his international debut for the Zimabwbwe cricket team in July 2018.

== Domestic career ==
He made his Twenty20 debut for Zimbabwe against Eastern Province in the 2016 Africa T20 Cup on 30 September 2016. In February 2017, he was named in an academy squad by Zimbabwe Cricket to tour England later that year.

He made his List A debut for Rising Stars in the 2017–18 Pro50 Championship on 17 April 2018. He was the leading run-scorer during the tournament, with 379 runs in nine matches.

In September 2018, he was named in Zimbabwe's squad for the 2018 Africa T20 Cup tournament. In December 2020, he was selected to play for the Eagles in the 2020–21 Logan Cup.

== International career ==
In June 2018, he was named in a Board XI team for warm-up fixtures ahead of the 2018 Zimbabwe Tri-Nation Series. Later the same month, he was named in a 22-man preliminary Twenty20 International (T20I) squad for the tri-nation series. The following month, he was named in Zimbabwe's One Day International (ODI) squad for their series against Pakistan. He made his One Day International (ODI) debut for Zimbabwe against Pakistan on 20 July 2018.

In June 2019, he was named in Zimbabwe's ODI and T20I squads for their series against the Netherlands. In February 2020, he was named in Zimbabwe's ODI and T20I squads for their tour against Bangladesh. He made his T20I debut for Zimbabwe, against Bangladesh, on 9 March 2020. In December 2023, he was selected in Zimbabwe's squad for the T20 series against Ireland. In the second T20, he scored 39 runs off 27 balls.
