= Zimbabwean cricket team in Kenya in 1992–93 =

Zimbabwean national cricket team tour

The Zimbabwe national cricket team toured Kenya in March 1993 and played a limited overs matches against the Kenyan team shortly after they had finished a home series against India.

== Only match ==
28 March 1993
Scorecard

Zimbabwe; 186/9 (50 overs)	v	Kenya; 187/7 (46.3 overs)
Gavin Briant 67; Edward Odumbe 3/10 (10 overs)		Maurice Odumbe 72*; David Brain 2/23 (10 overs)

Kenya won by 3 wickets
Gymkhana Club Ground, Nairobi
Umpires: Mehmood Quraishy and Subhash Modi
Player of the match: Maurice Odumbe (KEN)

- Zimbabwe won the toss and decided to bat
