= List of Zimbabwe ODI cricketers =

This is a list of Zimbabwean One-day International cricketers displaying career statistics for all players that have represented Zimbabwe in at least one One Day International (ODI). An ODI is an international cricket match between two representative teams, each having ODI status, as determined by the International Cricket Council (ICC). An ODI differs from Test matches in that the number of overs per team is limited, and that each team has only one innings. The list is arranged in the order in which each player won his first ODI cap. Where more than one player won their first ODI cap in the same match, those players are listed alphabetically by surname.

== Key ==
General

- † – Wicket-keeper
- First – Year of debut
- Last – Year of latest game
- Mat – Number of matches played

Batting

- Runs – Runs scored in career
- HS – Highest score
- Avg – Runs scored per dismissal
- * – Batsman remained not out
- 100 – Number of centuries scored
- 50 – Number of half centuries scored

Bowling

- Balls – Balls bowled in career
- Wkt – Wickets taken in career
- BBI – Best bowling in an innings
- Ave – Average runs per wicket
- 5WI – Five wickets or more in a match

Fielding

- Ca – Catches taken
- St – Stumpings taken

== Players ==
Statistics are correct as of 31 August 2025.

Zimbabwe ODI cricketers
General					Batting					Bowling					Fielding	
No.	Name	First	Last	Mat	Runs	HS	Avg	50	100	Balls	Wkt	BBI	Ave	5WI	Ca	St
1	Iain Butchart	1983	1995	20	252	54	18.00	1	0	702	12	3/57	53.33	0	4	—
2	Kevin Curran	1983	1987	11	287	73	26.09	2	0	506	9	3/65	44.22	0	1	—
3	Duncan Fletcher	1983	1983	6	191	71*	47.75	2	0	301	7	4/42	31.57	0	0	—
4	Jack Heron	1983	1983	6	50	18	8.33	0	0	—	—	—	—	—	1	—
5	Vince Hogg	1983	1983	2	7	7*	—	0	0	90	0	—	—	—	0	—
6	David Houghton †	1983	1997	63	1530	142	26.37	12	1	12	1	1/19	19.00	0	29	2
7	Ali Shah	1983	1996	28	437	60*	16.80	1	0	1077	18	3/33	45.11	0	6	—
8	Grant Paterson	1983	1987	10	123	27	12.30	0	0	—	—	—	—	—	2	—
9	Andy Pycroft	1983	1992	20	295	61	17.35	2	0	—	—	—	—	—	6	—
10	Peter Rawson	1983	1987	10	80	24*	16.00	0	0	571	12	3/47	35.58	0	4	—
11	John Traicos	1983	1993	27	88	19	11.00	0	0	1524	19	3/35	51.94	0	3	—
12	Robin Brown	1983	1987	7	110	38	15.71	0	0	—	—	—	—	—	5	—
13	Gerald Peckover	1983	1983	3	33	16*	16.50	0	0	—	—	—	—	—	0	—
14	Eddo Brandes	1987	1999	59	404	55	13.03	2	0	2828	70	5/28	32.37	2	11	—
15	Andy Waller	1987	1997	39	818	83*	23.37	4	0	—	—	—	—	—	10	—
16	Malcolm Jarvis	1987	1995	12	37	17	18.50	0	0	601	9	2/37	50.11	0	1	—
17	Kevin Arnott	1987	1993	13	238	60	23.80	2	0	—	—	—	—	—	3	—
18	Babu Meman	1987	1987	1	19	19	19.00	0	0	41	0	—	—	—	0	—
19	Kevin Duers	1992	1992	6	7	5	7.00	0	0	300	3	1/17	85.33	0	2	—
20	Andy Flower †	1992	2003	213	6786	145	35.34	55	4	30	0	—	—	—	141	32
21	Wayne James	1992	1996	11	101	29	14.42	0	0	—	—	—	—	—	6	—
22	Alistair Campbell	1992	2003	188	5185	131*	30.50	30	7	509	12	2/20	36.16	0	76	—
23	Mark Burmester	1992	1995	8	109	39	18.16	0	0	209	5	3/36	42.60	0	2	—
24	David Brain	1992	1995	23	117	27	8.35	0	0	1091	21	3/51	40.42	0	5	—
25	Gary Crocker	1992	1993	6	98	50	24.50	1	0	238	7	4/26	29.71	0	1	—
26	Craig Evans	1992	2002	53	764	96*	18.19	2	0	964	21	3/11	40.38	0	12	—
27	Grant Flower	1992	2004	219	6536	142*	33.69	40	6	5420	104	4/32	40.25	0	86	—
28	Mark Dekker	1992	1996	23	379	79	18.95	2	0	347	9	2/16	32.22	0	5	—
29	Stephen Peall	1992	1996	21	91	21	6.50	0	0	900	8	3/54	84.75	0	1	—
30	Eboo Essop-Adam	1992	1992	1	14	14*	—	0	0	—	—	—	—	—	2	—
31	Ujesh Ranchod	1992	1993	3	3	3*	—	0	0	174	1	1/44	130.00	0	1	—
32	Gavin Briant	1993	1993	5	39	16	13.00	0	0	—	—	—	—	—	0	—
33	John Rennie	1993	2000	44	201	27	13.40	0	0	1965	34	3/27	46.00	0	12	—
34	Heath Streak (Note: Heath Streak also played two One Day Internationals for Africa XI. Only his record for Zimbabwe is given above.)	1993	2005	187	2902	79*	28.45	13	0	9414	237	5/32	29.81	1	45	—
35	Guy Whittall	1993	2003	147	2705	83	22.54	11	0	4060	88	4/35	39.55	0	36	—
36	Glen Bruk-Jackson	1993	1993	1	12	12	12.00	0	0	—	—	—	—	—	0	—
37	Gary Martin	1994	1995	5	31	16	7.75	0	0	132	2	1/15	47.50	0	0	—
38	Paul Strang	1994	2001	95	1090	47	22.24	0	0	4351	96	5/21	33.05	2	30	—
39	Stuart Carlisle	1995	2005	111	2740	121*	27.67	9	3	—	—	—	—	—	39	—
40	Bryan Strang	1995	2001	49	92	18	5.11	0	0	2494	46	6/20	37.34	1	15	—
41	Henry Olonga	1995	2003	50	95	31	7.30	0	0	2059	58	6/19	34.08	2	13	—
42	Sean Davies	1996	1996	4	67	45	16.75	0	0	—	—	—	—	—	0	—
43	Charlie Lock	1996	1996	8	8	5	8.00	0	0	289	8	5/44	27.37	1	1	—
44	Craig Wishart	1996	2005	90	1719	172*	23.22	5	2	12	0	—	—	—	26	—
45	Andy Whittall	1996	2000	63	168	29	7.63	0	0	3085	45	3/23	50.02	0	21	—
46	Gary Brent	1996	2008	70	408	59*	12.00	1	0	3390	75	4/22	37.01	0	20	—
47	Gavin Rennie	1996	2003	40	617	76	19.90	2	0	90	2	1/17	37.50	0	16	—
48	Pommie Mbangwa	1996	2002	29	34	11	4.85	0	0	1369	11	2/24	103.63	0	3	—
49	Everton Matambanadzo	1996	1997	7	8	5*	4.00	0	0	297	11	4/32	19.72	0	1	—
50	Dirk Viljoen	1997	2001	53	512	63*	14.22	2	0	2075	44	3/20	37.25	0	18	—
51	Adam Huckle	1997	1999	19	9	5*	2.25	0	0	858	7	2/27	94.42	0	7	—
52	Murray Goodwin	1998	2000	71	1818	112*	27.13	8	2	248	4	1/12	52.50	0	20	—
53	Trevor Madondo	1998	2001	13	191	71	15.91	1	0	—	—	—	—	—	2	—
54	Mluleki Nkala	1998	2006	50	324	47	10.80	0	0	1582	22	3/12	71.36	0	6	—
55	Neil Johnson	1998	2000	48	1679	132*	36.50	11	4	1503	35	4/42	34.85	0	19	—
56	Andy Blignaut	1999	2010	54	626	63*	18.96	5	0	2348	50	4/43	41.26	0	11	—
57	David Mutendera	1999	2001	9	20	10	10.00	0	0	390	9	3/23	37.11	0	1	—
58	Brian Murphy	2000	2003	31	72	20*	8.00	0	0	1422	29	3/43	38.96	0	11	—
59	Travis Friend	2000	2004	51	548	91	16.11	3	0	1930	37	4/55	48.08	0	17	—
60	Dougie Marillier	2000	2003	48	672	100	18.16	3	1	1574	30	4/38	41.16	0	12	—
61	Mark Vermeulen	2000	2009	43	868	92	22.25	6	0	5	1	1/5	5.00	0	18	—
62	Angus Mackay	2001	2001	3	—	—	—	—	—	132	0	—	—	—	1	—
63	Dion Ebrahim	2001	2005	82	1443	121	20.61	4	1	5	0	—	—	—	23	—
64	Tatenda Taibu (Note: Tatenda Taibu also played one One Day Internationals for Africa XI. Only his record for Zimbabwe is given above.) †	2001	2012	149	3383	107*	29.42	22	2	84	2	2/42	30.50	0	114	33
65	Hamilton Masakadza	2001	2019	209	5658	178*	27.73	34	5	1844	39	3/39	41.94	0	71	—
66	Douglas Hondo	2001	2005	56	127	17	7.47	0	0	2381	61	4/37	35.59	0	15	—
67	Sean Ervine	2001	2004	42	698	100	25.85	2	1	1649	41	3/29	38.07	0	5	—
68	Trevor Gripper	2001	2003	8	80	26	10.00	0	0	120	2	2/28	38.00	0	4	—
69	Ray Price	2002	2012	102	406	46	9.66	0	0	5374	100	4/22	35.75	0	17	—
70	Stuart Matsikenyeri	2002	2015	113	2224	90	22.01	13	0	920	16	2/25	48.62	0	37	—
71	Barney Rogers	2002	2005	15	478	84	31.86	5	0	324	6	2/55	53.50	0	7	—
72	Richard Sims	2002	2003	3	31	24	31.00	0	0	132	0	—	—	—	1	—
73	Waddington Mwayenga	2002	2004	3	1	1	0.50	0	0	126	1	1/61	157.00	0	2	—
74	Charles Coventry †	2003	2015	39	831	194*	24.44	3	1	—	—	—	—	—	19	1
75	Vusi Sibanda (Note: Vusi Sibanda also played two One Day Internationals for Africa XI. Only his record for Zimbabwe is given above.)	2003	2015	125	2914	116	24.28	21	2	219	3	1/12	68.00	0	42	—
76	Alester Maregwede	2003	2005	11	124	37	12.40	0	0	—	—	—	—	—	2	—
77	Blessing Mahwire	2004	2006	23	117	22*	10.63	0	0	885	21	3/29	36.90	0	6	—
78	Elton Chigumbura (Note: Elton Chigumbura also played three One Day Internationals for Africa XI. Only his record for Zimbabwe is given above.)	2004	2018	210	4289	117	25.37	19	2	4165	95	4/28	42.70	0	72	—
79	Tinashe Panyangara	2004	2016	65	239	33	6.63	0	0	3242	65	3/28	46.52	0	9	—
80	Brendan Taylor †	2004	2025	207	6704	145*	35.28	39	11	396	9	3/54	45.11	0	133	29
81	Prosper Utseya	2004	2015	164	1406	68*	16.73	4	0	8571	133	5/36	46.90	1	50	—
82	Tawanda Mupariwa	2004	2016	40	185	33	8.40	0	0	2019	57	4/39	29.64	0	9	—
83	Ed Rainsford	2004	2010	39	55	9*	5.50	0	0	1907	45	5/36	31.13	1	8	—
84	Christopher Mpofu	2004	2020	84	57	9*	2.85	0	0	3960	93	6/52	38.50	1	11	—
85	Gavin Ewing	2004	2005	7	97	46	13.85	0	0	312	5	3/31	47.20	0	3	—
86	Sean Williams	2005	2025	164	5217	174	37.53	37	8	5014	86	4/43	47.63	0	59	—
87	Anthony Ireland	2005	2007	26	30	8*	3.75	0	0	1326	38	3/41	29.34	0	2	—
88	Chamu Chibhabha	2005	2023	109	2474	99	23.12	16	0	1679	35	4/25	46.60	0	34	—
89	Keith Dabengwa	2005	2010	37	514	45	19.03	0	0	1109	23	3/15	40.69	0	12	—
90	Terry Duffin	2006	2007	23	546	88	23.73	3	0	—	—	—	—	—	6	—
91	Keegan Meth	2006	2012	11	106	53	13.25	1	0	406	6	2/52	69.83	0	1	—
92	Piet Rinke	2006	2006	18	317	72	17.61	3	0	277	8	2/11	34.12	0	0	—
93	Gregory Strydom	2006	2006	12	147	58	14.70	1	0	66	1	1/28	61.00	0	4	—
94	Ryan Higgins	2006	2006	11	15	7*	2.50	0	0	544	13	4/21	29.23	0	5	—
95	Tafadzwa Mufambisi	2006	2007	6	55	21	9.16	0	0	—	—	—	—	—	1	—
96	Tafadzwa Kamungozi	2006	2015	14	27	12*	5.40	0	0	636	12	2/36	45.66	0	6	—
97	Tino Mawoyo	2006	2014	7	58	15	8.28	0	0	—	—	—	—	—	2	—
98	Friday Kasteni	2007	2007	3	18	9	6.00	0	0	—	—	—	—	—	0	—
99	Timycen Maruma	2007	2021	22	196	35	11.52	0	0	225	4	2/50	57.50	0	12	—
100	Cephas Zhuwao	2008	2018	9	154	45	17.11	0	0	19	0	—	—	—	1	—
101	Regis Chakabva †	2008	2022	61	1188	102	22.00	4	1	—	—	—	—	—	53	5
102	Malcolm Waller	2009	2018	79	1259	99*	19.07	5	0	666	10	2/44	56.60	0	22	—
103	Graeme Cremer	2009	2018	96	744	58	14.58	1	0	4680	119	6/46	30.22	3	37	—
104	Forster Mutizwa †	2009	2011	17	403	79	31.00	4	0	—	—	—	—	—	9	2
105	Kyle Jarvis	2009	2019	49	222	37	9.65	0	0	2362	58	4/17	36.00	0	11	—
106	Trevor Garwe	2009	2009	1	—	—	—	—	—	36	1	1/50	50.00	0	1	—
107	Greg Lamb	2010	2011	15	197	37	17.90	0	0	642	12	3/45	38.91	0	2	—
108	Shingirai Masakadza	2010	2014	16	170	45*	21.25	0	0	791	25	4/46	35.64	0	7	—
109	Craig Ervine	2010	2025	128	3600	130*	33.02	23	4	—	—	—	—	—	58	—
110	Ian Nicolson	2010	2010	2	14	14	7.00	0	0	72	2	1/44	59.00	0	0	—
111	Brian Vitori	2011	2016	24	86	20*	7.81	0	0	1193	32	5/20	35.90	2	4	—
112	Natsai M'shangwe	2011	2014	6	38	16	7.60	0	0	336	3	2/50	86.66	0	1	—
113	Njabulo Ncube	2011	2011	1	0	0*	—	0	0	53	3	3/69	23.00	0	0	—
114	Tendai Chatara	2013	2023	87	206	23	6.43	0	0	4254	115	4/33	32.62	0	8	—
115	Tinotenda Mutombodzi	2013	2020	14	177	34	14.75	0	0	371	7	2/33	51.28	0	7	—
116	Sikandar Raza	2013	2025	153	4476	141	36.99	24	7	5078	94	4/55	43.64	0	61	—
117	Michael Chinouya	2013	2013	2	6	6*	6.00	0	0	66	1	1/36	50.00	0	0	—
118	Donald Tiripano	2014	2022	38	364	55*	17.33	1	0	1508	36	5/63	40.44	1	5	—
119	Richmond Mutumbami †	2014	2020	36	618	74	19.31	3	0	—	—	—	—	—	24	5
120	Luke Jongwe	2014	2024	43	430	46	13.87	0	0	1415	40	5/6	33.47	1	12	—
121	Neville Madziva	2014	2016	12	67	25	7.44	0	0	520	20	4/49	25.95	0	3	—
122	John Nyumbu	2014	2015	19	46	18	4.60	0	0	844	17	3/42	43.41	0	7	—
123	Solomon Mire	2014	2019	47	955	112	20.31	3	1	507	12	4/43	42.91	0	12	—
124	Peter Moor †	2014	2019	49	827	58*	20.67	4	0	—	—	—	—	—	22	1
125	Roy Kaia	2015	2015	1	—	—	—	—	—	—	—	—	—	—	0	—
126	Brian Chari †	2015	2020	14	186	39	13.28	0	0	—	—	—	—	—	3	1
127	Wellington Masakadza	2015	2025	42	243	40	11.04	0	0	1751	33	4/21	43.12	0	13	—
128	Taurai Muzarabani	2015	2016	8	12	5	3.00	0	0	323	7	2/32	37.42	0	0	—
129	Tendai Chisoro	2015	2020	21	146	42*	13.27	0	0	900	24	3/16	28.50	0	6	—
130	Carl Mumba	2016	2020	7	32	13	8.00	0	0	272	7	3/69	46.57	0	1	—
131	Tarisai Musakanda	2016	2022	16	308	60	20.53	1	0	12	0	—	—	—	12	—
132	Ryan Burl	2017	2024	52	938	83	24.68	6	0	730	19	5/10	40.31	1	23	—
133	Richard Ngarava	2017	2025	55	272	48	12.95	0	0	2435	70	5/32	30.68	1	9	—
134	Blessing Muzarabani	2018	2025	57	134	17*	5.15	0	0	2717	70	5/49	33.35	1	14	—
135	Ryan Murray	2018	2018	5	108	47	27.00	0	0	—	—	—	—	—	3	—
136	Liam Roche	2018	2018	3	4	4	2.00	0	0	138	2	1/54	78.50	0	1	—
137	Prince Masvaure	2018	2018	2	40	39	20.00	0	0	18	0	—	—	—	0	—
138	Tinashe Kamunhukamwe	2018	2024	12	131	51	10.91	1	0	—	—	—	—	—	1	—
139	Brandon Mavuta	2018	2024	14	92	28*	11.50	0	0	420	10	2/30	39.60	0	2	—
140	Ainsley Ndlovu	2019	2019	2	—	—	—	—	—	102	1	1/29	80.00	0	0	—
141	Wessly Madhevere	2020	2025	40	782	72	21.13	6	0	818	15	3/36	46.33	0	14	—
142	Charlton Tshuma	2020	2020	2	0	0	0.00	0	0	66	1	1/35	83.00	0	0	—
143	Tadiwanashe Marumani †	2021	2025	21	225	45	13.23	0	0	—	—	—	—	—	10	—
144	Dion Myers	2021	2024	8	141	34	17.62	0	0	12	1	1/13	13.00	0	4	—
145	Milton Shumba	2021	2024	10	57	26	8.14	0	0	41	0	—	—	—	3	—
146	Takudzwanashe Kaitano	2022	2024	11	157	42	15.70	0	0	—	—	—	—	—	2	—
147	Tanaka Chivanga	2022	2023	8	25	8*	8.33	0	0	301	4	1/38	73.75	0	1	—
148	Innocent Kaia	2022	2023	19	450	110	25.00	2	1	28	0	—	—	0	4	—
149	Victor Nyauchi	2022	2023	10	43	26	7.16	0	0	402	7	2/65	50.42	0	2	—
150	Brad Evans	2022	2025	17	129	33*	10.75	0	0	644	15	5/54	42.13	1	7	—
151	Tony Munyonga	2022	2025	9	145	43*	24.16	0	0	6	0	—	—	0	1	—
152	Clive Madande †	2022	2025	17	287	74	23.91	2	0	—	—	—	—	—	9	1
153	Gary Ballance (Note: Gary Ballance also played 16 One Day International matches for England. Only his record for Zimbabwe is given above.)	2023	2023	5	157	64*	39.25	2	0	—	—	—	—	—	5	—
154	Joylord Gumbie †	2023	2024	16	382	78	23.87	2	0	—	—	—	—	—	10	0
155	Faraz Akram	2024	2024	3	6	5	3.00	0	0	168	3	2/58	54.66	0	2	—
156	Tapiwa Mufudza	2024	2024	2	1	1	1.00	0	0	102	0	—	—	—	0	0
157	Brian Bennett	2024	2025	11	348	169	31.63	0	1	20	0	—	—	0	4	0
158	Trevor Gwandu	2024	2025	8	7	3*	3.50	0	0	278	8	2/44	36.25	0	0	0
159	Ben Curran	2024	2025	8	340	118*	48.57	1	2	—	—	—	—	—	1	0
160	Newman Nyamhuri	2024	2025	4	8	7	4.00	0	0	132	3	3/53	44.00	0	0	0
161	Tinotenda Maposa	2024	2024	1	0	0	0.00	0	0	10	0	—	—	0	0	0
162	Johnathan Campbell	2025	2025	3	8	6*	8.00	0	0	12	0	—	—	0	3	0
163	Ernest Masuku	2025	2025	1	—	—	—	—	—	30	1	1/32	32.00	0	0	—

== See also ==
- One Day International
- Zimbabwean cricket team
- List of Zimbabwe Test cricketers
- List of Zimbabwe Twenty20 International cricketers
