= Liam Roche =

Zimbabwean cricketer (born 1999)

Personal information
- Full name: Liam Nicholas Roche
- Born: 14 September 1999 (age 27)
- Batting: Right-handed
- Bowling: Right arm off break
- Role: Allrounder

International information
- National side: Zimbabwe
- ODI debut (cap 136): 13 July 2018 v Pakistan
- Last ODI: 22 July 2018 v Pakistan

Career statistics
Competition	ODI	FC	LA
Matches	3	1	9
Runs scored	4	9	205
Batting average	2.00	9.00	34.16
100s/50s	0/0	0/0	0/2
Top score	4	9	55
Balls bowled	138	80	146
Wickets	2	3	7
Bowling average	78.50	10.66	51.42
5 wickets in innings	0	0	0
10 wickets in match	0	0	0
Best bowling	1/54	3/32	2/43
Catches/stumpings	1/–	0/–	3/–
- Source: ESPNCricinfo, 22 July 2018

Liam Roche (born 14 September 1999) is a Zimbabwean cricketer. He made his first-class debut for Mashonaland Eagles in the 2017–18 Logan Cup on 21 November 2017. Four days prior to his debut, he was named as captain of Zimbabwe's squad for the 2018 Under-19 Cricket World Cup.

He made his List A debut for Mashonaland Eagles in the 2017–18 Pro50 Championship on 1 December 2017.

In June 2018, he was named in a Zimbabwe Select team for warm-up fixtures ahead of the 2018 Zimbabwe Tri-Nation Series. The following month, he was named in Zimbabwe's One Day International (ODI) squad for their series against Pakistan. He made his ODI debut for Zimbabwe against Pakistan on 13 July 2018.
