= Eboo Essop-Adam =

Zimbabwean cricketer (born 1968)

Personal information
- Full name: Ebrahim Ali Essop-Adam
- Born: 16 November 1968 (age 57); Salisbury, Rhodesia
- Batting: Right-handed
- Bowling: Right-arm off break

International information
- National side: Zimbabwe
- Only ODI (cap 30): 8 November 1992 v New Zealand

Domestic team information
- Years: Team
- 1994/95–1995/96: Mashonaland

Career statistics
Competition	ODI	FC	LA
Matches	1	9	3
Runs scored	14	268	46
Batting average	–	16.75	23.00
100s/50s	0/0	0/2	0/0
Top score	14*	69	25
Balls bowled	–	144	–
Wickets	–	3	–
Bowling average	–	38.33	–
5 wickets in innings	–	0	–
10 wickets in match	–	0	–
Best bowling	–	1/16	–
Catches/stumpings	2/–	7/–	3/–
- Source: ESPNcricinfo, 26 December 2022

Ebrahim Ali Essop-Adam (born 16 November 1968) is a former Zimbabwean cricketer. A right-handed batsman and right-arm off break bowler, he played one ODI for Zimbabwe in 1992. He also played first-class cricket, representing Mashonaland in the Logan Cup during the mid-1990s.

Born in Salisbury (now Harare), Essop-Adam is of Indian descent. Cricinfo's Martin Williamson described Essop-Adam as a diminutive batsman and an athletic fielder.
