= Ryan Murray (cricketer) =

Zimbabwean cricketer

Personal information
- Full name: Ryan Craig Murray
- Born: 30 March 1998 (age 28)
- Batting: Right-handed
- Bowling: Right arm off break
- Role: Wicketkeeper

International information
- National side: Zimbabwe
- ODI debut (cap 135): 13 July 2018 v Pakistan
- Last ODI: 22 July 2018 v Pakistan

Career statistics
Competition	ODI	FC	LA	T20
Matches	5	2	3	1
Runs scored	108	113	62	34
Batting average	27.00	28.25	31.00	34.00
100s/50s	0/0	0/1	0/0	0/0
Top score	47	84	32*	34
Catches/stumpings	1/0	6/1	3/0	0/0
- Source: ESPNcricinfo, 3 September 2018

Ryan Murray (born 30 March 1998) is a Zimbabwean cricketer. He made his Twenty20 debut for Zimbabwe against Free State in the 2016 Africa T20 Cup on 9 September 2016. Prior to his Twenty20 debut, he was part of Zimbabwe's squad for the 2016 Under-19 Cricket World Cup.

He made his List A debut for Zimbabwe A against Afghanistan A during Afghanistan's tour of Zimbabwe, on 29 January 2017. He made his first-class debut for Rising Stars in the 2017–18 Logan Cup on 12 November 2017. In January 2018, he was named in Zimbabwe' One Day International (ODI) squad for the tri-series in Bangladesh, but he did not play.

In June 2018, he was named in a Board XI team for warm-up fixtures ahead of the 2018 Zimbabwe Tri-Nation Series. Later the same month, he was named in a 22-man preliminary Twenty20 International (T20I) squad for the tri-nation series. The following month, he was named in Zimbabwe's One Day International (ODI) squad for their series against Pakistan. He made his ODI debut against Pakistan on 13 July 2018.

In September 2018, he was named as the vice-captain of Zimbabwe's squad for the 2018 Africa T20 Cup tournament.
