= Pakistani cricket team in Zimbabwe in 2018 =

International cricket tour

	Zimbabwe	Pakistan
- Dates: 13 – 22 July 2018
Captains	Hamilton Masakadza	Sarfaraz Ahmed

One Day International series
- Results: Pakistan won the 5-match series 5–0
Most runs	Hamilton Masakadza (132)	Fakhar Zaman (515)
Most wickets	Tendai Chatara (3); Wellington Masakadza (3)	Faheem Ashraf (9); Usman Khan (9); Shadab Khan (9)
- Player of the series: Fakhar Zaman (Pak)

The Pakistan cricket team toured Zimbabwe in July 2018 to play five One Day International (ODI) matches. All the fixtures were played at the Queens Sports Club, Bulawayo. Originally, the tour was scheduled to have two Tests, three ODIs and two Twenty20 Internationals (T20Is).

In the fourth match of the series, Fakhar Zaman became the first batsman for Pakistan to score a double century in ODIs. His score of 210 not out broke the previous highest individual total for a Pakistan of 194 runs, scored by Saeed Anwar during the 1997 Pepsi Independence Cup. Zaman, along with Imam-ul-Haq, also made the highest opening partnership in ODIs, scoring 304 runs for the first wicket. This led to Pakistan scoring their highest score in ODIs, finishing their innings at 399/1.

In the fifth match, Zaman became the fastest player to score 1,000 runs in ODIs. He reached the milestone in 18 innings, beating the previous record of 21 innings, held by five other batsmen. Zaman went on to score 85 runs in the match, bringing his total to 515 runs in the series, the most by a Pakistan batsman in a bilateral ODI series. Zaman and Imam had scored 705 runs together across the series, the most by a pair in a bilateral ODI series. Zaman also recorded the most runs scored by a batsman between two dismissals in ODIs, with 455. Pakistan went on to win the series 5–0.

== Squads ==
Zimbabwe	Pakistan
Hamilton Masakadza (c); Brian Chari; Tendai Chatara; Chamu Chibhabha; Elton Chigumbura; Tendai Chisoro; Tinashe Kamunhukamwe; Wellington Masakadza; Prince Masvaure; Peter Moor; Christopher Mpofu; Ryan Murray; Tarisai Musakanda; Blessing Muzarabani; Richard Ngarava; Liam Roche; Donald Tiripano; ~~Malcolm Waller~~	Sarfaraz Ahmed (c, wk); Asif Ali; Hasan Ali; Mohammad Amir; Faheem Ashraf; Babar Azam; Imam-ul-Haq; Mohammad Hafeez; Junaid Khan; Shadab Khan; Usman Khan; Shoaib Malik; Mohammad Nawaz; Yasir Shah; ~~Haris Sohail~~; Fakhar Zaman

Ahead of the second ODI, Malcolm Waller withdrew himself from Zimbabwe's squad, citing labour-practice concerns. Ahead of the third ODI, Haris Sohail withdrew himself from Pakistan's squad for the remainder of the tour, due to his daughter's illness.

== ODI series ==
=== 1st ODI ===
13 July 2018
09:15
Scorecard

Pakistan; 308/7 (50 overs)	v	Zimbabwe; 107 (35 overs)
Imam-ul-Haq 128 (134); Tendai Chatara 2/50 (10 overs)		Ryan Murray 32* (48); Shadab Khan 4/32 (9 overs)

Pakistan won by 201 runs
Queens Sports Club, Bulawayo
Umpires: Ian Gould (Eng) and Langton Rusere (Zim)
Player of the match: Imam-ul-Haq (Pak)

- Zimbabwe won the toss and elected to field.
- Ryan Murray, Liam Roche (Zim) and Asif Ali (Pak) all made their ODI debuts.

=== 2nd ODI ===
16 July 2018
09:15
Scorecard

Zimbabwe; 194 (49.2 overs)	v	Pakistan; 195/1 (36 overs)
Hamilton Masakadza 59 (75); Usman Khan 4/36 (10 overs)		Fakhar Zaman 117* (129)

Pakistan won by 9 wickets
Queens Sports Club, Bulawayo
Umpires: Ian Gould (Eng) and Russell Tiffin (Zim)
Player of the match: Fakhar Zaman (Pak)

- Zimbabwe won the toss and elected to bat.

=== 3rd ODI ===
18 July 2018
09:15
Scorecard

Zimbabwe; 67 (25.1 overs)	v	Pakistan; 69/1 (9.5 overs)
Chamu Chibhabha 16 (28); Faheem Ashraf 5/22 (8.1 overs)		Fakhar Zaman 43* (24); Blessing Muzarabani 1/43 (5 overs)

Pakistan won by 9 wickets
Queens Sports Club, Bulawayo
Umpires: Ian Gould (Eng) and Jeremiah Matibiri (Zim)
Player of the match: Faheem Ashraf (Pak)

- Zimbabwe won the toss and elected to bat.
- Prince Masvaure (Zim) made his ODI debut.
- Faheem Ashraf (Pak) took his first five-wicket haul in ODIs.
- In terms of balls remaining, this was Pakistan's biggest win in ODIs.

=== 4th ODI ===
20 July 2018
09:15
Scorecard

Pakistan; 399/1 (50 overs)	v	Zimbabwe; 155 (42.4 overs)
Fakhar Zaman 210* (156); Wellington Masakadza 1/78 (10 overs)		Donald Tiripano 44 (71); Shadab Khan 4/28 (8.4 overs)

Pakistan won by 244 runs
Queens Sports Club, Bulawayo
Umpires: Ian Gould (Eng) and Langton Rusere (Zim)
Player of the match: Fakhar Zaman (Pak)

- Pakistan won the toss and elected to bat.
- Tinashe Kamunhukamwe (Zim) made his ODI debut.
- Imam-ul-Haq and Fakhar Zaman (Pak) made the highest opening partnership in ODIs (304).
- Fakhar Zaman became the first batsman for Pakistan to score a double century in ODIs.
- Pakistan's total of 399/1 was their highest score in ODIs.
- Junaid Khan (Pak) took his 100th wicket in ODIs.

=== 5th ODI ===
22 July 2018
09:15
Scorecard

Pakistan; 364/4 (50 overs)	v	Zimbabwe; 233/4 (50 overs)
Imam-ul-Haq 110 (105); Liam Roche 1/65 (10 overs)		Ryan Murray 47 (70); Mohammad Nawaz 2/47 (10 overs)

Pakistan won by 131 runs
Queens Sports Club, Bulawayo
Umpires: Ian Gould (Eng) and Russell Tiffin (Zim)
Player of the match: Babar Azam (Pak)

- Pakistan won the toss and elected to bat.
- Fakhar Zaman (Pak) became the fastest batsman to score 1,000 runs in ODIs (18 innings).
- Shoaib Malik (Pak) became the seventh cricketer to score 7,000 runs and take 150 wickets in ODIs.
