= Hollywood Cricket Club =

Amateur cricket club in Los Angeles, US

The Hollywood Cricket Club (HCC) is an amateur cricket club in Los Angeles, California. It is a member of the Southern California Cricket Association. The club was formed in 1932 by British actor and cricketer C. Aubrey Smith.

== About ==
Smith learned to play cricket at Charterhouse School and was on the same team as Lord Hawke and the three Studd brothers at the University of Cambridge. While at Cambridge, Smith also played for Sussex. In his prime, he played against W. G. Grace and with The Champion on the "Gentlemen versus Players" games held annually between the best amateur and professional cricketers in Britain at Lord's. In 1887 Smith toured Australia with an England team that included Andrew Stoddart. Both players resorted to playing Rugby in New Zealand to earn passage back to England. This was the start of British Lions tours to the Antipodes. Ref (Sentence, P.David, Cricket in America 1710–2000) In 1889 Smith captained the England team in South Africa which introduced the Currie Cup, a competition that continues to this day in South Africa.

Smith went to Hollywood in 1929 and teamed up with Boris Karloff of the Overseas Cricket Club to teach cricket at UCLA in 1932. The same year Arthur Mailey's Australian team captained by Vic Richardson played Smith's team of British actors at UCLA. Smith scored 24 runs against Don Bradman's team. The publicity from the Australians' North American cricket tour was put to good effect with the founding of the Hollywood Cricket Club and the securing of a permanent cricket ground at Griffith Park in Burbank.

A photograph of the Hollywood Cricket Club taken at UCLA in 1932 includes H. B Warner (with whom Smith used to play cricket for the Actors' XI in England), Boris Karloff and Harrow-educated Frank Somerset, who later became secretary of the Screen Actors' Guild (also founded in May 1933). P. G. Wodehouse was Hollywood CC's first secretary—in the same year as he became the highest-paid script writer in Hollywood. Psmith, featured in stories such as The Golden Bat before Wodehouse invented the character of Jeeves, was named for a pre-war Warwickshire CCC cricketer. Wodehouse opened the batting for Dulwich College, but his field tenure with HCC was limited due to script-writing commitments.

The Hollywood Cricket Club built a pavilion at the ground which still stands, though it has since been turned into a wedding reception center at the Burbank Equestrian Center. The original Griffith Park ground had four pitches and it was officially opened on 23 May 1933 with Los Angeles Parks and Recreation Director Williamson as the guest of honor. Williamson gave his name to a knock-out trophy played between local teams. Hollywood was the first to win the Williamson Trophy in 1934. With actors such as Boris Karloff, Aubrey Smith, Ronald Colman, Leslie Howard (who joined for social reasons, despite disliking cricket), David Niven, Laurence Olivier, Olivia de Havilland, Joan Fontaine, Elsa Lanchester and Merle Oberon attending matches at the Griffith Park ground on Sundays. The British colony in Hollywood set the tone for tea on lawn.

Evelyn Waugh satirized the HCC in his 1946 book The Loved One, with its protagonist, "Sir Auberon Abercrombie", a thinly-disguised portrait of Sir Aubrey Smith.

From its beginnings, the Hollywood Cricket Club continues to take a leading role in the development of California cricket. In its over 75-year existence, the HCC has ranged worldwide to East Africa, India and Canada, while maintaining an extremely competitive local presence with three teams in separate divisions of the Southern California Cricket Association. The Hollywood Cricket Club attracts test and county players from India, Zimbabwe and England that strengthen its roster on occasion.

== Notable past members ==
- Brian Aherne
- Nigel Bruce
- Ronald Colman
- Gary Crocker
- George Coulouris
- Douglas Fairbanks Jr.
- Bramwell Fletcher
- Errol Flynn
- Cary Grant
- Leslie Howard
- Boris Karloff
- Frank Lawton
- Jack Merivale
- Ray Milland
- David Niven
- Laurence Olivier
- Basil Rathbone
- Ann Richards
- Cliff Severn
- C. Aubrey Smith
- H. B. Warner
- P. G. Wodehouse
- Robert Finlayson, younger brother of James Finlayson

== Sources ==
- Sentance, David, Cricket in America 1710-2000 (McFarland, March 2006)
