= Friday Kasteni =

Zimbabwean cricketer (born 1988)

Personal information
- Full name: Friday Kasteni
- Born: 25 March 1988 (age 38); Kadoma, Zimbabwe
- Batting: Left-handed
- Bowling: Slow left-arm orthodox
- Role: Batsman

International information
- National side: Zimbabwe
- ODI debut (cap 98): 10 February 2007 v Bangladesh
- Last ODI: 21 March 2007 v Pakistan

Domestic team information
- Years: Team
- 2004/05: Midlands
- 2007/08–2008/09: Centrals
- 2009/10–2010/11: Mid West Rhinos

Career statistics
Competition	ODI	FC	LA
Matches	3	37	35
Runs scored	18	1,597	671
Batting average	6.00	25.34	22.36
100s/50s	0/0	3/7	0/3
Top score	9	101*	80
Balls bowled	–	212	66
Wickets	–	6	0
Bowling average	–	22.00	–
5 wickets in innings	–	0	–
10 wickets in match	–	0	–
Best bowling	–	10	–
Catches/stumpings	0/–	32/–	10/–
- Source: CricketArchive, 29 August 2012

Friday Kasteni (born 25 March 1988) is a Zimbabwean cricketer. He is a left-handed aggressive batsman.

He scored a century on his first-class debut for Midlands against Matabeleland in April 2005. He went on to represent Zimbabwe at the Under-19 World Cup in Sri Lanka in 2006. Kasteni made his One Day International debut in February 2007, against Bangladesh.

Kasteni was then selected in Zimbabwe's 2007 World Cup squad. He was the only surprise inclusion, with the veteran of 15 Tests, Hamilton Masakadza, left out. In his first World Cup innings, Kasteni was out for a golden duck.

In a controversial move by the selectors, Kasteni replaced Terrence Duffin, one of the team's most experienced players, for Zimbabwe's final two World Cup games. The move did not pay off, and Kasteni scored just 9 runs at an average of 4.50.

In 2008, Kasteni was chosen by the Zimbabwe Cricket Board to attend a six-week course at Cricket Australia's Centre of Excellence in Brisbane and in 2012 moved to Canberra, Australia on a sports scholarship to qualify for permanent residency of Australia with the intention of playing first-class cricket in Australia.
