= 1992 Cricket World Cup final =

1992 ICC Cricket World Cup Final
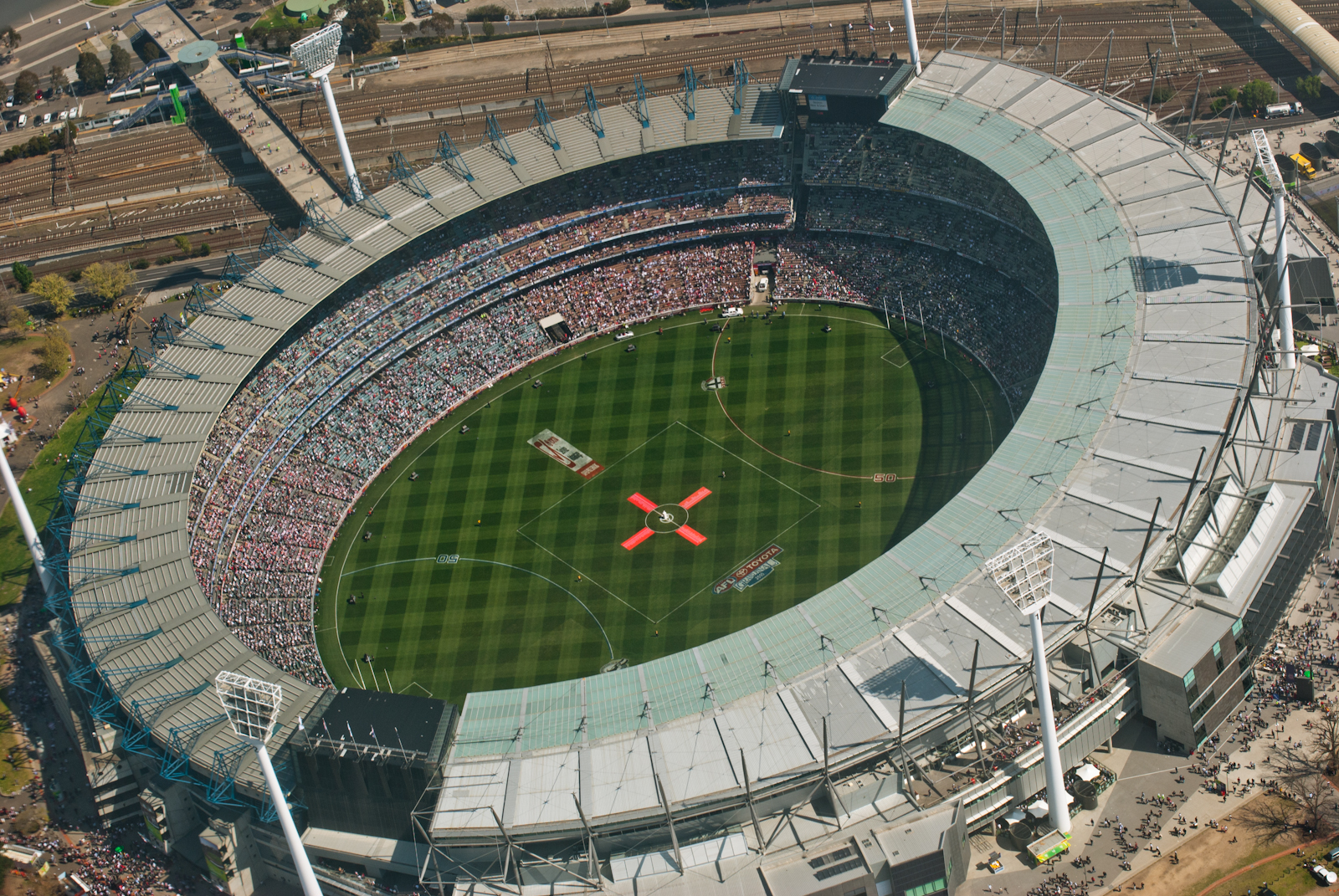
- The Melbourne Cricket Ground
- Event: 1992 ICC Cricket World Cup
Pakistan	England
(Pakistan)	(England)
249/6	227
50 overs	49.2 overs
- Pakistan won by 22 runs
- Date: 25 March 1992
- Venue: Melbourne Cricket Ground, Melbourne
- Player of the match: Wasim Akram (Pak)
- Umpires: Brian Aldridge (NZ) and Steve Bucknor (WI)
- Attendance: 87,182

The final of the 1992 ICC Cricket World Cup was played at the Melbourne Cricket Ground, Melbourne on 25 March 1992. The match was won by Pakistan, under the captaincy of Imran Khan, as they defeated England by 22 runs to lift their first ever World Cup trophy. This was the second Cricket World Cup final to be played outside England and the first in Australia. 87,182 spectators turned out to see the final.

== Details ==
=== Match officials ===
- On-field umpires: Brian Aldridge (NZ) and Steve Bucknor (WI)
- Match referee: Peter Burge (Aus)

=== Summary ===
England and Pakistan played each other in the Round Robin stage and Pakistan were dismissed for 74 runs. However, the match could not be completed and yielded no results. In the final, winning the toss, Pakistan elected to bat with Ijaz Ahmed coming in as the only change from their semi final against New Zealand, while England too had one change with Derek Pringle replacing Gladstone Small. Pakistan openers Rameez Raja and Aamer Sohail struggled against Pringle and Chris Lewis, as both were dismissed cheaply. Imran Khan promoted himself and played the sheet anchor role along with Javed Miandad, pushing the scorecard. Imran was lucky to get a reprieve as Graham Gooch dropped a difficult chance. Derek Pringle bowled 4 no balls and 1 wide in his first spell, that read 8–2–13–2. Imran Khan and Javed Miandad struggled to score free runs and Pakistan touched the 100 mark only in the 31st over. Finally England broke the 139 partnership as Javed Miandad was dismissed by Richard Illingworth for 58. Soon Imran Khan was dismissed by Ian Botham for 72, as Wasim Akram joined Inzamam-ul-Haq. The pair added 52 runs from 38 balls as Pakistan scored 124 runs from their final 15 overs as the total score read 249/6 in the stipulated 50 overs, a gettable total for England's much fancied batting side. Derek Pringle had a dream spell of 10–2–22–3, but gave away 8 extra runs in the form of 5 no balls and 3 wides, while Richard Illingworth and Ian Botham claimed one wicket each, it became the 16th victim of the latter.

Chasing the target of 250 to win their maiden world cup, favourites England lost all rounder Ian Botham for no score to Wasim Akram. Alec Stewart soon fell to Aaquib Javed leaving England reeling at 21/2. In form batsman Greame Hick and Graham Gooch slowly pushed the score, but Hick was dismissed by a beauty from Mushtaq Ahmed, a Googly that Hick failed to read. Soon Gooch fell to Mushtaq and England were in deep trouble with scorecard reading 69/4. Neil Fairbrother and Allan Lamb tried a rescue act with a partnership of 72 runs as the asking rate began to pile up. Coming back for the second spell, Wasim Akram broke England's resistance by dismissing Allan Lamb and Chris Lewis with successive deliveries, with England at 141/6. Neil Fairbrother and Dermot Reeve could not score big, as part-time bowler Aamir Sohail completed his quota of 10 overs as England failed to utilize Sohail's spell. With the final 10 overs to go, England needed 84 runs from 54 balls with an asking rate of 9.33 per over. Soon Fairbrother was dismissed for 62 scored off 70 balls by Aaquib sealing the fate of England. As 34 runs required from final 12 balls, it was a tough task for them as Imran Khan dismissed Richard Illingworth, that turned out to be his last ball in International cricket. For Pakistan, Aaquib Javed and Mushtaq Ahmed claimed 2 and 3 wickets respectively. Wasim Akram was adjudged the Man of the match for his all round performance of 3/49 and 33 off 18.

25 March 1992
scorecard

Pakistan; 249/6 (50 overs)	v	England; 227 (49.2 overs)
Imran Khan 72 (110); Derek Pringle 3/22 (10 overs)		Neil Fairbrother 62 (70); Mushtaq Ahmed 3/41 (10 overs)

Pakistan won by 22 runs
Melbourne Cricket Ground, Melbourne
Attendance : 87,182
Umpires: Brian Aldridge (NZ) and Steve Bucknor (WI)
Player of the match: Wasim Akram (Pak)

- Pakistan won the toss and elected to bat.

== Scorecard ==
Pakistan batting
Player	Status	Runs	Balls	4s	6s	Strike rate
Aamer Sohail	c †Stewart b Pringle	4	19	0	0	21.05
Ramiz Raja	lbw b Pringle	8	26	1	0	30.76
Imran Khan*	c Illingworth b Botham	72	110	5	1	65.45
Javed Miandad	c Botham b Illingworth	58	98	4	0	59.18
Inzamam-Ul-Haq	b Pringle	42	35	4	0	120.00
Wasim Akram	run out (†Stewart)	33	18	4	0	183.33
Saleem Malik	not out	0	1	0	0	0.00
Ijaz Ahmed	did not bat	0	0	0	0	0.00
Moin Khan†	did not bat	0	0	0	0	0.00
Mushtaq Ahmed	did not bat	0	0	0	0	0.00
Aaqib Javed	did not bat	0	0	0	0	0.00
Extras	(lb 19, nb 7, w 6)	32				
Total	(6 wickets; 50 overs)	249		18	1	

Fall of wickets: 1–20 (Sohail, 4.6 ov), 2–24 (Ramiz, 8.2 ov), 3–163 (Miandad, 39.3 ov), 4–197 (Imran, 43.3 ov), 5–249 (Inzamam, 49.5 ov), 6–249 (Akram, 49.6 ov)

England bowling
Bowler	Overs	Maidens	Runs	Wickets	Econ	Wides	NBs
Derek Pringle	10	2	22	3	2.20	3	5
Chris Lewis	10	2	52	0	5.20	1	2
Ian Botham	7	0	42	1	6.00	1	0
Phil DeFreitas	10	1	42	0	4.20	0	0
Richard Illingworth	10	0	50	1	5.00	0	0
Dermot Reeve	3	0	22	0	7.33	1	0

England batting
Player	Status	Runs	Balls	4s	6s	Strike rate
Graham Gooch*	c Javed b Mushtaq	29	66	1	0	43.93
Ian Botham	c †Moin b Akram	0	6	0	0	0.00
Alec Stewart†	c †Moin b Javed	7	16	1	0	43.75
Graeme Hick	lbw b Mushtaq	17	36	1	0	47.22
Neil Fairbrother	c †Moin b Javed	62	70	3	0	88.57
Allan Lamb	b Akram	31	41	2	0	75.60
Chris Lewis	b Akram	0	1	0	0	00.00
Dermot Reeve	c Ramiz b Mushtaq	15	32	0	0	46.87
Derek Pringle	not out	18	16	1	0	112.50
Phil DeFreitas	run out (Saleem/†Moin)	10	8	0	0	125.00
Richard Illingworth	c Ramiz b Imran	14	10	2	0	140.00
Extras	(lb 5, nb 6, w 13)	24				
Total	(all out in 49.2 overs)	227		11	0	

Fall of wickets: 1–6 (Botham, 2.5 ov), 2–21 (Stewart, 7.3 ov), 3–59 (Hick, 18.6 ov), 4–69 (Gooch, 20.5 ov), 5–141 (Lamb, 34.5 ov), 6–141 (Lewis, 34.6 ov), 7–180 (Fairbrother, 42.5 ov), 8–183 (Reeve, 43.6 ov), 9–208 (DeFreitas, 47.1 ov), 10–227 (Illingworth, 49.2 ov)

Pakistan bowling
Bowler	Overs	Maidens	Runs	Wickets	Econ	Wides	NBs
Wasim Akram	10	0	49	3	4.90	6	4
Aaqib Javed	10	2	27	2	2.70	3	1
Mushtaq Ahmed	10	1	41	3	4.10	1	0
Ijaz Ahmed	3	0	13	0	4.33	2	0
Imran Khan	6.2	0	43	1	6.78	0	1
Aamer Sohail	10	0	49	0	4.90	1	0

== See also ==
- 1992 Cricket World Cup squads
