= Neil Fairbrother =

English cricketer (born 1963)

Personal information
- Full name: Neil Harvey Fairbrother
- Born: 9 September 1963 (age 63); Warrington, Lancashire
- Batting: Left-handed
- Bowling: Left-arm medium

International information
- National side: England (1987–1999)
- Test debut (cap 525): 4 June 1987 v Pakistan
- Last Test: 13 March 1993 v Sri Lanka
- ODI debut (cap 94): 2 April 1987 v India
- Last ODI: 29 May 1999 v India

Career statistics
Competition	Test	ODI	FC	LA
Matches	10	75	366	505
Runs scored	219	2,092	20,612	14,761
Batting average	15.64	39.47	41.22	41.69
100s/50s	0/1	1/16	47/104	9/107
Top score	83	113	366	145
Balls bowled	12	6	795	174
Wickets	0	0	7	3
Bowling average	–	–	71.42	64.33
5 wickets in innings	–	–	0	0
10 wickets in match	–	–	0	0
Best bowling	–	–	2/91	1/17
Catches/stumpings	4/–	33/–	290/–	185/–
Medal record
Men's Cricket
Representing England
ICC Cricket World Cup
Runner-up	1992 Australia and New Zealand
- Source: Cricinfo, 23 April 2011

Neil Fairbrother (born Neil Harvey Fairbrother; 9 September 1963) is an English former cricketer who played 75 One Day International matches and 10 Test matches as a batsman for England. Fairbrother, named by his mother after her favourite player, the Australian cricketer Neil Harvey, was educated at Lymm Grammar School and played his county cricket for Lancashire. Although primarily a one day player at international level, he had strong success in the County Championship and had a first class high score of 366. He was a part of the English squad which finished as runners-up at the 1992 Cricket World Cup.

Fairbrother retired from all cricket in 2002, and became Director of Cricket at International Sports Management. He was also a player manager for a time, managing among others Andrew Flintoff. In February 2018, Fairbrother set up Phoenix Management.

== Domestic career ==
Fairbrother played for Lancashire, Transvaal and England. He was team captain of Lancashire in 1992–1993. Cricket writer, Colin Bateman, described Fairbrother as "an inventive, intelligent left-hander".

In 1990, Fairbrother scored 366 for Lancashire against Surrey at The Oval. 311 of his runs came in a single day, and his feat is unique in that he scored at least 100 runs in each of the three sessions that day. Another milestone came in 1998, when he became the first man to play in ten Lord's one-day domestic cricket cup finals. Fairbrother finished on the winning side in seven of these finals, including the Benson and Hedges Cup in 1984, when he top-scored for his side aged 20, and both the Benson and Hedges Cup and NatWest Trophy in both 1990 and 1996. He also helped Lancashire to success in the Refuge Assurance Cup in 1988 and the National League (formerly the Refuge Assurance League) in 1989 and 1999.

== International career ==
Fairbrother made his international debut on 2 April 1987, in a One Day International against India. Following a match-winning century against a West Indies side including Malcolm Marshall, Curtly Ambrose and Courtney Walsh at Lord's in 1991, he established himself as a regular in middle-order of the one-day side for several years. Test success, however, proved elusive. Bowled for a duck on his debut, he made just ten Test appearances for England, with only one half-century from 15 innings, at an average of 15.64. However, his international honours included appearing for England in three Cricket World Cups. Chief among the world cup appearances was the 1992 World Cup Final where Fairbrother topscored for England with a gritty 62 off 70 balls and almost pulled off an improbable chase.
