= Iqbal Sikander =

Pakistani cricketer (born 1958)

Cricket information
- Batting: Right-handed
- Bowling: Legbreak, googly

Career statistics
Competition	ODI
Matches	4
Runs scored	1
Batting average	–
100s/50s	0/0
Top score	1*
Balls bowled	210
Wickets	3
Bowling average	49.00
5 wickets in innings	0
10 wickets in match	0
Best bowling	1/30
Catches/stumpings	0/–
Medal record
Men's Cricket
Representing Pakistan
ICC Cricket World Cup
Winner	1992 Australia and New Zealand
- Source: ESPNcricinfo, 3 May 2006

Mohammad Iqbal Sikander (born 19 December 1958 in Karachi, Sindh) is a Pakistani former cricketer who played four One Day Internationals (ODI), all of them in the 1992 Cricket World Cup and was part of the Pakistan squad that won it, but was never selected again for Pakistan in either Tests or ODIs.

In January 1991, playing for Karachi Whites against Peshawar in a one-day match, he recorded the extraordinary bowling analysis of 6.2–3–7–7; no other cricketer has ever taken seven wickets in a List A game for fewer runs.

Iqbal spent a lot of time in English league cricket, this included several seasons playing for Tonge Cricket Club in the Bolton Cricket League where he took a competition record 133 wickets in 1995. In 2001, he took 101 league wickets for Leigh Cricket Club in the Liverpool Competition.

Following his playing career, Iqbal worked as the Asian Cricket Council's development officer. This role included helping to establish cricket in Afghanistan, He had spells as coach of the Afghanistan national cricket team and Oman national cricket team.

== Education ==
He was educated at the St. Patrick's High School, Karachi.
