= Gerald Peckover =

Zimbabwean cricketer (born 1995)

Personal information
- Full name: Gerald Edward Peckover
- Born: 2 June 1955 (age 71); Salisbury, Rhodesia
- Batting: Right-handed
- Role: Wicket-keeper

International information
- National side: Zimbabwe
- ODI debut (cap 13): 13 June 1983 v West Indies
- Last ODI: 20 June 1983 v West Indies

Domestic team information
- Years: Team
- 1977/78–1978/79: Rhodesia
- 1982/83–1983/84: Zimbabwe

Career statistics
Competition	ODI	FC	LA
Matches	3	14	9
Runs scored	33	478	189
Batting average	16.50	21.72	27.00
100s/50s	0/0	0/3	1/0
Top score	16*	93	102
Catches/stumpings	0/0	27/4	3/0
- Source: CricketArchive, 19 May 2013

Gerald Edward Peckover (born 2 June 1955) is a former Zimbabwean cricketer. He played three One Day Internationals for Zimbabwe at the 1983 Cricket World Cup.
