= Wasim Haider =

Pakistani cricketer (born 1967)

Personal information
- Full name: Wasim Haider
- Born: June 6, 1967 (age 59); Lyallpur, Punjab, Pakistan
- Batting: Right-handed
- Bowling: Right-arm fast-medium

Domestic team information
- Years: Team
- PIA
- Faisalabad

Career statistics
| Competition | ODI | FC | LA |
|---|---|---|---|
| Matches | 3 | 132 | 104 |
| Runs scored | 26 | 5,014 | 1070 |
| Batting average | 13.00 | 30.76 | 19.45 |
| 100s/50s | 0/0 | 6/26 | 0/2 |
| Top score | 13 | 184 | 62* |
| Balls bowled | 114 | 12,804 | 3876 |
| Wickets | 1 | 261 | 107 |
| Bowling average | 79.00 | 24.72 | 23.73 |
| 5 wickets in innings | 0 | 9 | 4 |
| 10 wickets in match | 0 | 1 | 0 |
| Best bowling | 1/36 | 6/46 | 6/20 |
| Catches/stumpings | 0/– | 59/– | 34/– |
- Source: ESPN Cricinfo, 1 July 2025

Wasim Haider (born 6 June 1967) is a Pakistani former right-arm fast medium bowler in cricket who played three One Day International matches during the 1992 Cricket World Cup and for PIA and Faisalabad. He was late to come into consideration for the squad, only selected because Waqar Younis failed to recover from an injury in time to play in the 1992 tournament. He took just one wicket - in his third and final match, against India, which Pakistan lost: he was also on the losing side in his first match, against the West Indies, and his second match against England was rained off, after Pakistan were bowled out for 74 but only completed eight overs in England's reply (of which Haider bowled one).
