= Jack Heron (cricketer) =

Zimbabwean cricketer (born 1948)

Personal information
- Full name: Jack Gunner Heron
- Born: 8 November 1948 (age 78); Salisbury, Southern Rhodesia
- Batting: Right-handed
- Bowling: Right-arm medium
- Role: Batsman

International information
- National side: Zimbabwe
- ODI debut (cap 4): 9 June 1983 v Australia
- Last ODI: 20 June 1983 v West Indies

Career statistics
| Competition | ODI | FC | LA |
|---|---|---|---|
| Matches | 6 | 60 | 28 |
| Runs scored | 50 | 2,830 | 763 |
| Batting average | 8.33 | 26.20 | 30.52 |
| 100s/50s | 0/0 | 5/13 | 2/3 |
| Top score | 18 | 175 | 148* |
| Catches/stumpings | 1/– | 39/– | 6/– |
- Source: CricketArchive, 12 October 2013

Jack Gunner Heron (born 8 November 1948) is a Zimbabwean former cricketer. He played all six of his One Day Internationals (ODIs) for Zimbabwe in the 1983 Cricket World Cup.

Heron played one of the slowest innings in ODI history when he scored 12 off 73 balls against the West Indies at New Road, Worcester on 13 June 1983.
