= Babu Meman =

Zimbabwean cricketer (1952–2025)

Personal information
- Full name: Mohammed Ahmed Meman
- Born: 26 June 1952; Lundazi, Northern Rhodesia
- Died: 2 July 2025 (aged 73); Leicester, England
- Batting: Right-handed
- Bowling: Right-arm offbreak
- Role: All-rounder

International information
- National side: Zimbabwe
- Only ODI (cap 18): 17 October 1987 v India

Career statistics
Competition	ODI	FC	LA
Matches	1	5	9
Runs scored	19	68	85
Batting average	19.00	11.33	17.00
100s/50s	0/0	0/0	0/0
Top score	19	36	38
Balls bowled	41	336	394
Wickets	0	4	5
Bowling average	–	48.75	61.40
5 wickets in innings	–	0	0
10 wickets in match	–	0	0
Best bowling	–	3/21	2/50
Catches/stumpings	0/–	3/–	2/–
- Source: Cricinfo, 28 January 2015

Mohammed Ahmed Meman (26 June 1952 – 2 July 2025) was a Zimbabwean cricketer. He played one One Day International for Zimbabwe in the 1987 World Cup.

Meman also represented Shropshire in the Minor Counties Championship from 1977 to 1980, and played one match for Shropshire in the 1978 Gillette Cup, scoring 16 and taking 0/22 from ten overs against Surrey. During those years, he appeared in 32 matches for the county, achieving a century in two of them, making 888 runs and taking 55 wickets. At club level, he played for Pudsey St Lawrence in Yorkshire and Tonge.

Meman died on 2 July 2025, at the age of 73 .
