= Tambyah Murugaser =

Sri Lankan sportsman and sports administrator

Tambyah Murugaser (1924–1994) was a Sri Lankan sportsman and sports administrator. He was a former Vice President of the Board of Control for Cricket & Sri Lanka team manager.

Educated at Royal College Colombo, where he won colours six sports, playing the Royal-Thomian and won the Lorenz Scholarship for the best all rounder in 1942. Entering the University of Ceylon, he became captain of its cricket team and played tennis and table tennis for the university.

He played cricket at club level captaining the Tamil Union team. Holding the post of Vice President of the Board of Control for Cricket when Gamini Dissanayake was its president, he was the manager of the Sri Lanka World Cup cricket team to the United Kingdom in 1984.

After a long career in the shipping sector where he held directorships at several companies both private and public, he became a senior director of C. W. Mackie & Company Ltd. He was also past chairman of the Shippers Council of Sri Lanka and Association of Shippers Council of Bangladesh, India, Pakistan and Sri Lanka. A past president and Patron of the Tamil Union, the club renamed the B Block in the main pavilion T. Murugaser Block at the Paikiasothy Saravanamuttu Stadium in his honor.
