= Robin Brown (cricketer) =

Zimbabwean cricketer (born 1951)

Personal information
- Full name: Robin David Brown
- Born: 11 March 1951 (age 75); Gatooma, Southern Rhodesia
- Batting: Right-handed
- Bowling: Right-arm medium
- Role: Batsman

International information
- National side: Zimbabwe
- ODI debut (cap 12): 11 June 1983 v India
- Last ODI: 26 October 1987 v India

Domestic team information
- Years: Team
- 1976/77–1978/79: Rhodesia
- 1979/80: Zimbabwe-Rhodesia
- 1994/95–1995/96: Mashonaland Country Districts

Career statistics
Competition	ODI	FC	LA
Matches	7	66	59
Runs scored	110	2721	1224
Batting average	15.71	23.45	21.85
100s/50s	0/0	4/8	0/4
Top score	38	200*	80
Catches/stumpings	5/0	68/12	31/4
- Source: CricketArchive, 10 September 2013

Robin David Brown (born 11 March 1951) is a Zimbabwean cricket coach and former cricketer, who played seven One Day Internationals for the national side between 1983 and 1987.

== Coaching career ==
Brown acted as Zimbabwe's assistant coach during the 2007 World Cup. On 28 August 2007, Brown was appointed the national coach of Zimbabwe, taking over from Kevin Curran.

Within two weeks, Zimbabwe had beaten Australia in the 2007 ICC World Twenty20 tournament. However, a year later Brown was told by Zimbabwe Cricket that his 12-month contract would not be extended, and Walter Chawaguta, the former Zimbabwe Under-19 coach, took charge of the national team in August 2008. In 2012, Brown was appointed head of cricket development by Cricket Kenya and then interim national team coach.
