= 2018 Zimbabwe Tri-Nation Series =

International cricket tournament

- Date: 1–8 July 2018
- Location: Zimbabwe
- Result: Pakistan won the series
- Player of the series: Fakhar Zaman (Pak)
Teams
| Australia | Pakistan | Zimbabwe |
Captains
| Aaron Finch | Sarfaraz Ahmed | Hamilton Masakadza |
Most runs
| Aaron Finch (306) | Fakhar Zaman (278) | Solomon Mire (212) |
Most wickets
| Andrew Tye (12) | Mohammad Amir; Shadab Khan (5) | Blessing Muzarabani (5) |

The 2018 Zimbabwe Tri-Nation Series was a cricket tournament held from 1 to 8 July 2018 in Zimbabwe. It was a tri-nation series between Australia, Pakistan and Zimbabwe, with all the matches played as Twenty20 Internationals (T20Is) at the Harare Sports Club. In the fourth T20I, Pakistan beat Zimbabwe by seven wickets, therefore Australia and Pakistan qualified for the final. Pakistan defeated Australia in the final by six wickets to win the series.

Originally, the tour was just going to feature Australia and Zimbabwe, with the two teams playing two Tests and three One Day Internationals (ODIs). In June 2018, the Zimbabwe team threatened to boycott the tour in a dispute over outstanding money that had not been paid to players. Zimbabwe Cricket (ZC) paid one of the three months' worth of outstanding salaries, with the players giving ZC the deadline of 25 June 2018 to pay the rest, or face a boycott. However, despite not being paid, the players are likely to call off the protest and play in the series, but the demand for the outstanding salaries payment deadline remains in place. Zimbabwe Cricket assured players that all the outstanding salaries would be paid by 25 July 2018, one month after the players' deadline. A few days later, Zimbabwe Cricket named a 22-man preliminary squad for the series, which was trimmed down to a final seventeen players. Zimbabwe did not initially name a captain, after Graeme Cremer was sacked following the 2018 Cricket World Cup Qualifier tournament. A day before the first match, Hamilton Masakadza was named as Zimbabwe's captain.

== Squads ==
| Australia | Pakistan | Zimbabwe |
|---|---|---|
| Aaron Finch (c); Alex Carey (vc, wk); Ashton Agar; Travis Head; Nic Maddinson; Glenn Maxwell; Jhye Richardson; Kane Richardson; D'Arcy Short; Billy Stanlake; Marcus Stoinis; Mitchell Swepson; Andrew Tye; Jack Wildermuth | Sarfaraz Ahmed (c, wk); Shaheen Afridi; Asif Ali; Hasan Ali; Mohammad Amir; Faheem Ashraf; Sahibzada Farhan; Mohammad Hafeez; Shadab Khan; Usman Khan; Shoaib Malik; Mohammad Nawaz; Haris Sohail; Hussain Talat; Fakhar Zaman | Hamilton Masakadza (c); Ryan Burl; Brian Chari; Chamu Chibhabha; Elton Chigumbura; Tendai Chisoro; Kyle Jarvis; Wellington Masakadza; Brandon Mavuta; Solomon Mire; Peter Moor; Chris Mpofu; Tarisai Musakanda; Blessing Muzarabani; Ryan Murray; John Nyumbu; Donald Tiripano; Malcolm Waller; Cephas Zhuwao |

After the first T20I, Kyle Jarvis was ruled out for the series due to injury and was replaced by Donald Tiripano in Zimbabwe's squad.

== Points table ==
| Pos | Team | Pld | W | L | T | NR | Pts | NRR |
|---|---|---|---|---|---|---|---|---|
| 1 | Australia | 4 | 3 | 1 | 0 | 0 | 12 | 1.809 |
| 2 | Pakistan | 4 | 3 | 1 | 0 | 0 | 12 | 0.707 |
| 3 | Zimbabwe | 4 | 0 | 4 | 0 | 0 | 0 | −2.340 |

== T20I series ==
=== 1st T20I ===
1 July 2018
10:00
Scorecard

| Pakistan; 182/4 (20 overs) | v | Zimbabwe; 108 (17.5 overs) |
| Fakhar Zaman 61 (40); Tendai Chisoro 2/28 (4 overs) | | Tarisai Musakanda 43 (35); Mohammad Hafeez 2/3 (0.5 overs) |

Pakistan won by 74 runs
Harare Sports Club, Harare
Umpires: Jeremiah Matibiri (Zim) and Russell Tiffin (Zim)
Player of the match: Asif Ali (Pak)

- Zimbabwe won the toss and elected to field.
- Tarisai Musakanda and John Nyumbu (Zim) both made their T20I debuts.
- Shoaib Malik (Pak) scored his 2,000th run in T20Is.
- Sarfaraz Ahmed recorded the most wins as Pakistan captain in T20Is (20).

=== 2nd T20I ===
2 July 2018
10:00
Scorecard

| Pakistan; 116 (19.5 overs) | v | Australia; 117/1 (10.5 overs) |
| Shadab Khan 29 (25); Billy Stanlake 4/8 (4 overs) | | Aaron Finch 68* (33); Hasan Ali 1/18 (2 overs) |

Australia won by 9 wickets
Harare Sports Club, Harare
Umpires: Jeremiah Matibiri (Zim) and Russell Tiffin (Zim)
Player of the match: Billy Stanlake (Aus)

- Australia won the toss and elected to field.
- Shoaib Malik (Pak) became the first male cricketer to play 100 T20Is.

=== 3rd T20I ===
3 July 2018
10:00
Scorecard

| Australia; 229/2 (20 overs) | v | Zimbabwe; 129/9 (20 overs) |
| Aaron Finch 172 (76); Blessing Muzarabani 2/38 (4 overs) | | Solomon Mire 28 (19); Andrew Tye 3/12 (4 overs) |

Australia won by 100 runs
Harare Sports Club, Harare
Umpires: Jeremiah Matibiri (Zim) and Langton Rusere (Zim)
Player of the match: Aaron Finch (Aus)

- Zimbabwe won the toss and elected to field.
- Aaron Finch (Aus) recorded the highest individual score in T20Is (172).
- Aaron Finch and D'Arcy Short (Aus) recorded the highest partnership in T20Is (223).
- Australia recorded their biggest win in terms of runs in T20Is (100).

=== 4th T20I ===
4 July 2018
10:00
Scorecard

| Zimbabwe; 162/4 (20 overs) | v | Pakistan; 163/3 (19.1 overs) |
| Solomon Mire 94 (63); Hussain Talat 1/10 (1 over) | | Fakhar Zaman 47 (38); Solomon Mire 1/15 (2 overs) |

Pakistan won by 7 wickets
Harare Sports Club, Harare
Umpires: Iknow Chabi (Zim) and Langton Rusere (Zim)
Player of the match: Solomon Mire (Zim)

- Pakistan won the toss and elected to field.

=== 5th T20I ===
5 July 2018
10:00
Scorecard

| Pakistan; 194/7 (20 overs) | v | Australia; 149/7 (20 overs) |
| Fakhar Zaman 73 (42); Andrew Tye 3/35 (4 overs) | | Alex Carey 37* (24); Shaheen Afridi 3/37 (4 overs) |

Pakistan won by 45 runs
Harare Sports Club, Harare
Umpires: Langton Rusere (Zim) and Russell Tiffin (Zim)
Player of the match: Fakhar Zaman (Pak)

- Australia won the toss and elected to field.

=== 6th T20I ===
6 July 2018
10:00
Scorecard

| Zimbabwe; 151/9 (20 overs) | v | Australia; 154/5 (19.5 overs) |
| Solomon Mire 63 (52); Andrew Tye 3/28 (4 overs) | | Glenn Maxwell 56 (38); Blessing Muzarabani 3/21 (4 overs) |

Australia won by 5 wickets
Harare Sports Club, Harare
Umpires: Jeremiah Matibiri (Zim) and Russell Tiffin (Zim)
Player of the match: Andrew Tye (Aus)

- Zimbabwe won the toss and elected to bat.
- Brandon Mavuta (Zim) and Jack Wildermuth (Aus) both made their T20I debuts.

=== Final ===
8 July 2018
10:00
Scorecard

| Australia; 183/8 (20 overs) | v | Pakistan; 187/4 (19.2 overs) |
| D'Arcy Short 76 (53); Mohammad Amir 3/33 (4 overs) | | Fakhar Zaman 91 (46); Glenn Maxwell 2/35 (3 overs) |

Pakistan won by 6 wickets
Harare Sports Club, Harare
Umpires: Langton Rusere (Zim) and Russell Tiffin (Zim)
Player of the match: Fakhar Zaman (Pak)

- Australia won the toss and elected to bat.
- Sahibzada Farhan (Pak) made his T20I debut.
- This was Pakistan's highest successful run chase in T20Is.
