= Gary Crocker =

Zimbabwean cricketer (born 1962)

Personal information
- Full name: Gary John Crocker
- Born: 16 May 1962 (age 64); Bulawayo, Federation of Rhodesia and Nyasaland
- Batting: Left-handed
- Bowling: Left-arm medium-fast

International information
- National side: Zimbabwe (1992–1993)

Gary John Crocker (born 16 May 1962) is a former Zimbabwean cricketer who played in three Test matches and six One Day Internationals in 1992 and 1993. He is a past student of Hamilton High School.

Born in Bulawayo, Crocker played in Zimbabwe's first ever Test match, at Harare in 1992. Crocker retired from international cricket in 1993, and due to the political instability and economic meltdown in Zimbabwe he immigrated to the United States. Crocker resides in Los Angeles and plays social cricket for the Hollywood Cricket Club. His son Sean is a professional golfer.
