= Malcolm Jarvis =

Zimbabwean cricketer (born 1955)

Personal information
- Full name: Malcolm Peter Jarvis
- Born: 6 December 1955 (age 70); Fort Victoria, Federation of Rhodesia and Nyasaland
- Batting: Right-handed
- Bowling: Left-arm medium fast
- Role: Bowler

International information
- National side: Zimbabwe (1987–1995)
- Test debut (cap 9): 18 October 1992 v India
- Last Test: 26 October 1994 v Sri Lanka
- ODI debut (cap 16): 13 October 1987 v Australia
- Last ODI: 26 February 1995 v Pakistan

Career statistics
Competition	Test	ODI
Matches	5	12
Runs scored	4	37
Batting average	2.00	18.50
100s/50s	0/0	0/0
Top score	2*	17
Balls bowled	1,273	601
Wickets	11	9
Bowling average	35.72	50.11
5 wickets in innings	0	0
10 wickets in match	0	0
Best bowling	3/30	2/37
Catches/stumpings	2/–	1/–
- Source: Cricinfo, 11 February 2017

Malcolm Peter Jarvis (born 6 December 1955) is a former Zimbabwean cricketer who played in five Test matches and 12 One Day Internationals (ODIs) for the Zimbabwe national cricket team between 1987 and 1995. In the course of his short Test career Jarvis took over the Test match record for the most wickets in a complete career (11) with all dismissals being caught.

Jarvis' son, Kyle Jarvis, plays for the Zimbabwean national team. Jarvis now runs a guesthouse in Borrowdale near Harare with his wife.
