= Grant Paterson =

Zimbabwean cricketer (born 1960)

Personal information
- Full name: Grant Andrew Paterson
- Born: 9 June 1960 (age 66); Salisbury, Southern Rhodesia
- Batting: Right-handed
- Bowling: Right-arm off-spin
- Role: Batsman

International information
- National side: Zimbabwe
- ODI debut (cap 8): 9 June 1983 v Australia
- Last ODI: 23 October 1987 v New Zealand

Career statistics
Competition	ODI	FC	LA
Matches	10	39	67
Runs scored	123	1,404	1,575
Batting average	12.30	21.93	25.40
100s/50s	0/0	0/6	1/7
Top score	27	93	122
Balls bowled	–	9,220	-
Wickets	–	124	-
Bowling average	–	33.91	-
5 wickets in innings	–	1	-
10 wickets in match	–	0	–
Best bowling	–	5/95	-
Catches/stumpings	0/–	11/–	14/–
- Source: Cricinfo, 19 February 2015

Grant Andrew Paterson (born 9 June 1960) is a former Zimbabwean cricketer. He played ten One Day Internationals (ODIs) for Zimbabwe between 1981 and 1987.
