= Andy Waller =

Zimbabwean cricketer (born 1959)

Personal information
- Full name: Andrew Christopher Waller
- Born: 25 September 1959 (age 67); Salisbury, Rhodesia
- Nickname: Bundu
- Batting: Right-handed
- Bowling: Right-arm medium
- Relatives: Malcolm Waller (son)

International information
- National side: Zimbabwe (1987–1997)
- Test debut (cap 34): 18 December 1996 v England
- Last Test: 26 December 1996 v England
- ODI debut (cap 15): 10 October 1987 v New Zealand
- Last ODI: 15 February 1997 v India

Career statistics
Competition	Test	ODI	FC	LA
Matches	2	39	39	97
Runs scored	69	818	1,653	2,469
Batting average	23.00	23.37	27.09	29.39
100s/50s	0/1	0/4	1/11	1/14
Top score	50	83*	104	124
Balls bowled	–	–	546	153
Wickets	–	–	5	3
Bowling average	–	–	51.00	42.00
5 wickets in innings	–	–	0	0
10 wickets in match	–	–	0	0
Best bowling	–	–	1/1	1/3
Catches/stumpings	1/–	10/–	24/–	45/–
- Source: Cricinfo, 24 April 2019

Andrew Christopher Waller (born 25 September 1959) is a former Zimbabwean cricketer who played two Test matches and 39 One Day Internationals for the national cricket team. After retiring as a cricketer, he became the coach of the Namibia national team.

In April 2009, Waller was named the coaching manager of Zimbabwe Cricket. In September 2009, he was named the head coach of Mid West Rhinos, one of the Zimbabwe's newly introduced five cricket franchises. His son Malcolm Waller plays for the Zimbabwean national team while his nephew, Nathan, represents Mashonaland Eagles.
