= Gavin Briant =

Zimbabwean cricketer (born 1969)

Personal information
- Full name: Gavin Aubrey Briant
- Born: 11 April 1969 (age 57); Salisbury, Rhodesia
- Batting: Right-handed
- Bowling: Right-arm off-break

International information
- National side: Zimbabwe
- Only Test (cap 14): 13 March 1993 v India
- ODI debut (cap 32): 1 February 1993 v Pakistan
- Last ODI: 25 March 1993 v India

Career statistics
| Competition | Test | ODI | FC | LA |
|---|---|---|---|---|
| Matches | 1 | 5 | 11 | 12 |
| Runs scored | 17 | 39 | 447 | 152 |
| Batting average | 8.50 | 13.00 | 24.83 | 16.88 |
| 100s/50s | 0/0 | 0/0 | 0/3 | 0/1 |
| Top score | 16 | 16 | 69 | 51* |
| Catches/stumpings | 0/0 | 0/0 | 10/0 | 3/1 |
- Source: ESPNcricinfo, 15 June 2015

Gavin Aubrey Briant (born 11 April 1969) is a former Zimbabwean international cricketer. Briant was a right-handed batsman and a cover fielder who also occasionally kept wicket. He played one Test match and five One Day Internationals for the Zimbabwe national cricket team in February and March 1993, and was also a member of the team that won the ICC Trophy in 1990. Briant played some second XI cricket for Worcestershire County Cricket Club in 1989, and the following year scored 103 not out for Zimbabwe B against England A. His scores for the full Zimbawbean team were more modest; his top score in both Test cricket and One Day Internationals was 16. He was born at Salisbury in 1969.
