= Iain Butchart =

Zimbabwean cricketer (born 1960)

Personal information
- Full name: Iain Peter Butchart
- Born: 9 May 1960 (age 66); Bulawayo, Rhodesia
- Batting: Right-handed
- Bowling: Right-arm medium
- Role: All-rounder

International information
- National side: Zimbabwe
- Only Test (cap 27): 15 February 1995 v Pakistan
- ODI debut (cap 1): 9 June 1983 v Australia
- Last ODI: 7 January 1995 v England

Domestic team information
- Years: Team
- Mashonaland Country Districts

Career statistics
Competition	Test	ODI	FC	LA
Matches	1	20	53	92
Runs scored	23	252	1,686	1,156
Batting average	11.50	18.00	23.41	19.93
100s/50s	0/0	0/1	2/7	0/3
Top score	15	54	117	87
Balls bowled	18	702	4,184	3,796
Wickets	0	12	67	109
Bowling average	–	53.33	34.04	29.27
5 wickets in innings	–	0	1	3
10 wickets in match	–	0	0	0
Best bowling	–	3/57	5/65	5/31
Catches/stumpings	1/–	4/–	47/–	21/–
- Source: ESPNcricinfo, 11 June 2015

Iain Peter Butchart (born 9 May 1960) is a former Zimbabwean cricketer who played one Test at the age of 35, in addition to 20 One Day Internationals spread over twelve years. He was an all-rounder, a right-handed batsman and an often-used medium pacer (he bowled more than 13 overs a match in his first class career). He also played nine matches for Zimbabwe in the ICC Trophy, making 57 runs without being dismissed and taking 14 wickets, including four for 33 against the Netherlands in the 1986 final, which Zimbabwe won by 25 runs.

He played in the World Cup tournaments in 1983, 1987 and 1992.

In One Day Internationals – 17 of 20 were at the Cricket World Cup – his best batting performance was 54 off 70 balls against New Zealand at the 1987 World Cup, which took Zimbabwe from 104 for 7 to 221 for 8 chasing a total of 243 to win. However, with four to get and three balls remaining, Butchart was run out, leaving New Zealand as three-run winner. His best bowling figures were three for 57 – Aamer Sohail for 114, Inzamam-ul-Haq for 14 and Javed Miandad for 89 – in a 53-run loss to Pakistan at the 1992 World Cup. More recently he was the Zimbabwe U19 cricket coach at the U19 World Cup held in South Africa.

Iain Butchart along with Dave Houghton set the record for the highest 8th wicket partnership in ICC Cricket World Cup history(117)

Following his retirement from cricket, Butchart managed farms in Zimbabwe and South Africa.
