= Vince Hogg =

Zimbabwean cricketer (born 1952)

Personal information
- Full name: Vincent Richard Hogg
- Born: 3 July 1952 (age 74); Salisbury, Rhodesia
- Batting: Right-handed
- Bowling: Right-arm medium-fast
- Role: bowler

International information
- National side: Zimbabwe
- ODI debut (cap 5): 9 June 1983 v Australia
- Last ODI: 16 June 1983 v Australia

Career statistics
Competition	ODI	FC	LA
Matches	2	43	20
Runs scored	7	181	12
Batting average	–	5.32	4.00
100s/50s	0/0	5/13	0/0
Top score	7*	30	7*
Balls bowled	90	7,150	360
Wickets	0	123	10
Bowling average	–	26.29	15.10
5 wickets in innings	–	3	0
10 wickets in match	–	0	0
Best bowling	–	6/26	3/34
Catches/stumpings	0/–	12/–	2/–
- Source: CricketArchive, 21 October 2013

Vincent Richard Hogg (born 3 July 1952) is a Zimbabwean former cricketer. He played two One Day Internationals for Zimbabwe in the 1983 Cricket World Cup.

Hogg holds the record for the slowest innings in first-class cricket history - 0 runs in 87 minutes, for Zimbabwe-Rhodesia B against Natal B at Pietermaritzburg in 1979–80.
