= Ali Shah (cricketer) =

Zimbabwean cricketer (born 1959)

Ali Omarshah
Personal information
- Full name: Ali Hassimshah Omarshah
- Born: 7 August 1959 (age 67); Salisbury, Rhodesia and Nyasaland
- Batting: Left-handed
- Bowling: Right-arm medium
- Role: All-rounder

International information
- National side: Zimbabwe (1983–1996)
- Test debut (cap 12): 1 November 1992 v New Zealand
- Last Test: 18 September 1996 v Sri Lanka
- ODI debut (cap 7): 9 June 1983 v Australia
- Last ODI: 1 September 1996 v India

Domestic team information
- Years: Team
- 1994–1996: Mashonaland

Career statistics
Competition	Test	ODI	FC	LA
Matches	3	28	45	85
Runs scored	122	437	1,766	1,452
Batting average	24.40	16.80	25.59	18.61
100s/50s	0/1	0/1	3/5	0/5
Top score	62	60*	200*	98
Balls bowled	186	1,077	3,816	2,476
Wickets	1	18	35	40
Bowling average	125.00	45.11	48.85	47.42
5 wickets in innings	0	0	0	0
10 wickets in match	0	0	0	0
Best bowling	1/46	3/33	4/113	3/33
Catches/stumpings	0/–	6/–	21/–	35/–
- Source: ESPNcricinfo, 24 June 2017

Ali Hassimshah Omarshah (born 7 August 1959), known as Ali Shah, is a former Zimbabwean international cricketer. An all-rounder who batted left-handed and bowled right-arm medium pace, Shah played in three Test matches and 28 One Day Internationals (ODIs) for Zimbabwe between 1983 and 1996, and was the first non-white player to represent the country. He was educated at Morgan High School.

== International career ==
Shah played in three Cricket World Cups, in 1983, 1987 and 1992, and was also a member of the team that won the ICC Trophy in 1986 and 1990. Towards the end of his career, he played domestically for Mashonaland in the Logan Cup.

== After cricket ==
After retiring from playing, Shah became a television commentator and a selector of the national team. He was removed from the latter role in 2004 following the sacking of captain Heath Streak.
