= John Traicos =

Zimbabwean cricketer

Personal information
- Full name: Athanasios John Traicos
- Born: 17 May 1947 (age 79); Zagazig, Egypt
- Batting: Right-handed
- Bowling: Off spin
- Role: Bowler

International information
- National sides: South Africa (1970); Zimbabwe (1983–1993)
- Test debut (cap 235/11): 5 February 1970; South Africa v Australia
- Last Test: 13 March 1993; Zimbabwe v India
- ODI debut (cap 11): 9 June 1983; Zimbabwe v Australia
- Last ODI: 25 March 1993; Zimbabwe v India

Domestic team information
- Years: Team
- 1968–1979: Rhodesia
- 1993/94: Mashonaland

Career statistics
Competition	Test	ODI	FC	LA
Matches	7	27	122	125
Runs scored	19	88	1,198	331
Batting average	3.16	11.00	11.40	10.34
100s/50s	0/0	0/0	0/0	0/0
Top score	5*	19	43	21*
Balls bowled	1611	1524	25,267	7,059
Wickets	18	19	289	104
Bowling average	42.72	51.94	34.60	38.73
5 wickets in innings	1	0	8	0
10 wickets in match	0	0	0	0
Best bowling	5/86	3/35	6/66	4/20
Catches/stumpings	8/0	3/0	109/0	42/0
- Source: CricketArchive, 31 January 2017

Athanasios John Traicos (born 17 May 1947) is a former cricketer who represented South Africa and Zimbabwe at international level. He was primarily an off spin bowler, and one of a small number of cricketers to have played at the highest level for more than one country.

== Personal life ==
Traicos was born in Zagazig, Egypt in 1947 where his father Tryphon worked in the family business. He is of Greek descent, his father having been born in Lemnos, Greece and his maternal grandmother in Kalymnos. In September 1948 the family moved to what was then Fort Victoria in Southern Rhodesia. As a child he was known as "Naso", a contraction of his name "Athanasios", but when he started university he adopted the name "John".

In 1997, Traicos and his family moved to Australia due to political instability in Zimbabwe and settled in Perth. His wife, Annette Kileff, is a well established artist whose clients have included the late Richard Attenborough and Hollywood actor Denzel Washington. His elder daughter Chloe is an actress, and screenwriter and his younger daughter Catherine is a singer-songwriter.

== Domestic career ==
Traicos grew up in Rhodesia and played for that country, which at the time was regarded as a "province" within the South African domestic cricket setup. While a student at the University of Natal he benefited from being coached by Trevor Goddard making his first-class debut on 24 June 1967 when he represented South African Universities against Cambridge University, taking 5–54 in the first innings. He represented the South African Universities team on two more occasions before making his Rhodesia debut on 27 January 1968.

== South African cricket ==
He made his Test match debut for South Africa against Australia at Durban in February 1970 while still a student, having been selected at the request of the South African captain Ali Bacher. He took four catches and three wickets in his debut Test. However, after his three appearances in this series, South Africa were banned from international cricket because of apartheid.

== Zimbabwean cricket ==
Traicos continued to play for Rhodesia, and after the country was renamed in 1980 represented Zimbabwe in the 1982, 1986 and 1990 ICC Trophy tournaments. He also played for Zimbabwe in the 1983 Cricket World Cup, and was an important part of the side which inflicted a shock defeat on Australia. He captained the side for Zimbabwe's six matches at the 1987 World Cup, and also played at the 1992 World Cup.

Zimbabwe were raised to Test status in 1992, and Traicos was selected for the country's inaugural Test match, at Harare Sports Club against India. This appearance came a record 22 years and 222 days after his previous Test appearance, and he repaid the selectors' decision with his best Test bowling figures of 5/86. He played three more Tests for Zimbabwe, and his final appearance came at the age of 45 years and 304 days, making him the oldest Test player since Miran Bux 38 years earlier, and the twelfth oldest of all time. He would have been even further up the list had he been available for selection for the following year's tour of Pakistan, but Traicos' business commitments prevented this.

== See also ==
- List of Test cricketers born in non-Test playing nations
- List of cricketers who have played for two international teams
