= List of Warwickshire County Cricket Club grounds =

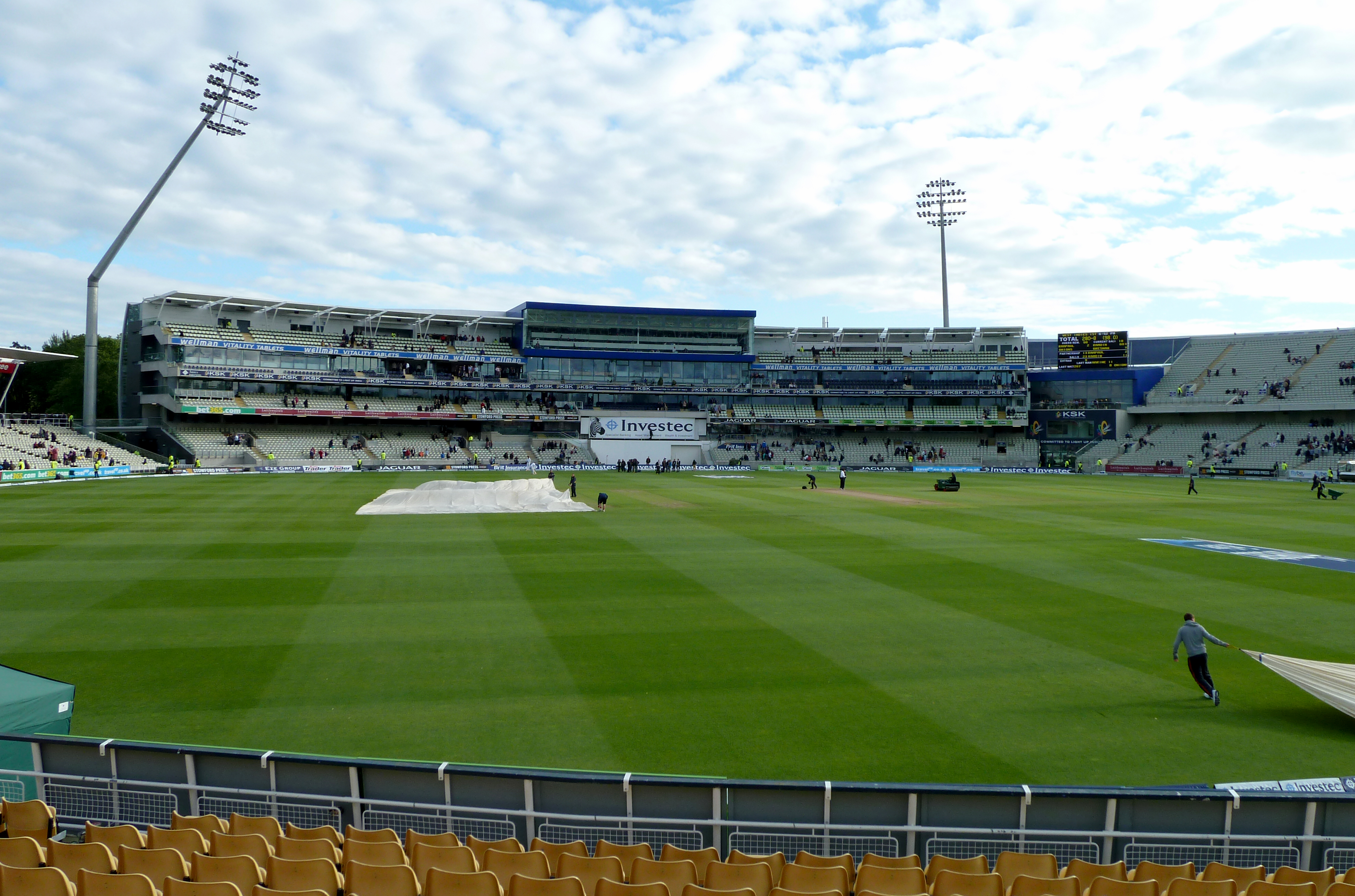
Edgbaston Cricket Ground was first used in 1894 and has staged the vast majority of Warwickshire's games.

Warwickshire County Cricket Club is one of the 18 member clubs of the English County Championship, representing the historic county of Warwickshire. The club was established on 8 April 1882 and has played first-class cricket since 1894, List A cricket since 1963, and Twenty20 cricket since 2003.^{[A]} Unlike most professional sports, in which a team usually has a single fixed home ground, county cricket clubs have traditionally used different grounds in various towns and cities within the county for home matches, although the use of minor "out grounds" has diminished since the 1980s. Warwickshire have played first class, List A, or Twenty20 matches at eleven different grounds. Six of these grounds are or were located in the cities of Birmingham and Coventry, which no longer lie within the administrative county of Warwickshire due to changes in the county boundaries in England in 1974.

The county's debut home match in first-class cricket was played at Edgbaston Cricket Ground in Birmingham against Kent in 1894. At this time the ground stood on land owned by the Gough-Calthorpe family, who had developed the manor of Edgbaston into an exclusive Birmingham suburb during the 19th century, and believed that a cricket ground would enhance the image of the district. Warwickshire had previously considered locating their headquarters in Rugby or Leamington Spa, but secretary William Ansell considered Birmingham more suitable due to its large population and railway connections. Edgbaston has remained the club's primary ground, hosting the majority of the club's matches, and also played host to the club's first home fixtures in the other formats of the game; in List A cricket in 1964 against Hampshire; and in Twenty20 cricket against Glamorgan in 2003. Since 1902 the ground has also hosted matches played by the England cricket team.

Warwickshire played all their matches at Edgbaston until 1903, when they played at the Bulls Head Ground in Coventry, which was used once a year until 1919, other than during the First World War. Over 70 years later, the club returned to the ground for three matches in the early 1990s. Prior to the First World War the club also played first-class matches at Arlington Avenue in Leamington Spa and Weddington Road in Nuneaton. In the interwar years, the county began to play matches at The Butts Ground and Morris Motors Ground in Coventry, the Griff and Coton Ground in Nuneaton and the Mitchells and Butlers' Ground in Birmingham. Of these grounds, only the latter two continued to be used after the Second World War. In 1946 the county began to use the Courtaulds Ground in Coventry and continued to play there until the 1980s.

The only ground other than Edgbaston used by Warwickshire for first-class cricket in the 21st century is Swans Nest Lane in Stratford-upon-Avon. Having only previously played a single match there in 1951, Warwickshire returned to the ground to play one first-class match in each of 2004 and 2005 as well as a single List A match in the latter year. Additionally, the county played a Twenty20 match at Rugby School in 2013 and planned to make this an annual occurrence, although the match scheduled for 2014 was abandoned without any play taking place due to bad weather. The team did, however, play one List A match at the school in 2015, and have scheduled three matches at the school in the 2024 One-Day Cup. Some of the grounds formerly used by the county still play host to matches at lower levels of the sport, such as those in Leamington Spa and Stratford-upon-Avon, which are used regularly by club teams playing in the Birmingham and District Premier League. Others, however, are disused, such as the Courtaulds Ground in Coventry, which in 2011 was reported to be overgrown and derelict, with only one wall of the pavilion still standing.

== Grounds ==
Below is a complete list of grounds used by Warwickshire County Cricket Club for first-class, List A and Twenty20 matches. Statistics are complete through to the end of the 2020 season. Only matches played by Warwickshire CCC at the grounds are recorded in the table. Matches abandoned without any play occurring are not included.

Name	Location	First-class			List A			Twenty20		
Name	Location	First	Last	Matches	First	Last	Matches	First	Last	Matches
Edgbaston Cricket Ground	Birmingham	14 May 1894 v Kent	15 August 2020 v Somerset	1,293	27 May 1964 v Hampshire	4 May 2019 v Lancashire	492	20 June 2003 v Glamorgan	20 September 2020 v Northamptonshire	102
Bulls Head Ground	Coventry	9 July 1903 v Gentlemen of Philadelphia	16 June 1992 v Middlesex	15	–	–	0^{[B]}	–	–	0
Arlington Avenue	Leamington Spa	29 June 1905 v Hampshire	23 May 1910 v Sussex	4	–	–	0	–	–	0
Weddington Road	Nuneaton	3 June 1912 v Leicestershire	2 July 1914 v Sussex	3	–	–	0	–	–	0
The Butts Ground	Coventry	15 July 1925 v Leicestershire	19 July 1930 v Hampshire	10	–	–	0	–	–	0
Griff and Coton Ground	Nuneaton	21 June 1930 v Leicestershire	7 June 1989 v Derbyshire	26	24 August 1969 v Lancashire	22 June 1980 v Northamptonshire	2	–	–	0
Morris Motors Ground	Coventry	11 July 1931 v Northamptonshire	9 July 1932 v Leicestershire	2	–	–	0	–	–	0
Mitchells and Butlers' Ground	Birmingham	5 July 1931 v Kent	14 June 1961 v Cambridge University	13	–	–	0	–	–	0
Courtaulds Ground	Coventry	15 June 1946 v Hampshire	14 August 1982 v Middlesex	56	13 May 1972 v Leicestershire	5 June 1983 v Derbyshire	8	–	–	0
Swans Nest Lane	Stratford-upon-Avon	20 June 1951 v Oxford University	25 May 2005 v Hampshire	3	29 May 2005 v Scotland	no other matches to date	1^{[B]}	–	–	0
Rugby School Ground	Rugby	–	–	0	17 August 2015 v Sussex	no other matches to date	1	6 July 2013 v Glamorgan	no other matches to date	1

== Notes ==
A. First-class cricket matches are designed to be contested over multiple days, with each team permitted two innings with no limit to the number of overs in an innings. List A matches are intended to be completed in a single day and restrict each team to a single innings of between 40 and 60 overs, depending on the specific competition. Twenty20 matches restrict each team to a single innings of 20 overs.

B. The Warwickshire Cricket Board team played one List A match at Swans Nest Lane in 2000 and three List A matches at the Bulls Head Ground between 2001 and 2002. The Warwickshire Cricket Board is a separate organisation from Warwickshire County Cricket Club and its matches are not included in the totals.
