= International cricket in 1982 =

International cricket season

The 1982 International cricket season was from May 1982 to August 1982.

== Season overview ==
International tours
Start date	Home team	Away team	Results [Matches]			
Start date	Home team	Away team	Test	ODI	FC	LA
2 June 1982	England	India	1–0 [3]	2–0 [2]	—	—
17 July 1982	England	Pakistan	2–1 [3]	2–0 [2]	—	—
International tournaments
Start date	Tournament				Winners	
16 June 1982	(England) 1982 ICC Trophy				Zimbabwe	

== June ==
=== India in England ===
Prudential Trophy ODI series
No.	Date	Home captain	Away captain	Venue	Result
ODI 152	2 June	Bob Willis	Sunil Gavaskar	Headingley, Leeds	England by 7 wickets
ODI 153	4 June	Bob Willis	Sunil Gavaskar	The Oval, London	England by 7 wickets
Test series
No.	Date	Home captain	Away captain	Venue	Result
Test 928	10–15 June	Bob Willis	Sunil Gavaskar	Lord's, London	England by 7 wickets
Test 929	24–28 June	Bob Willis	Sunil Gavaskar	Old Trafford, Manchester	Match drawn
Test 930	8–13 July	Bob Willis	Sunil Gavaskar	The Oval, London	Match drawn

=== 1982 ICC Trophy ===
Group A
Pos	Team	P	W	L	NR	Ab	RR	Pts
1	Zimbabwe	7	5	0	1	1	5.484	24
2	Papua New Guinea	7	4	2	0	1	3.896	18
3	Canada	7	3	1	1	2	3.803	18
4	Kenya	7	3	2	1	1	3.362	16
5	Hong Kong	7	2	3	0	2	3.027	12
6	United States	7	1	2	1	3	3.615	12
7	Gibraltar	7	0	3	2	2	2.381	8
8	Israel	7	0	5	2	0	2.718	4

Group B
Pos	Team	P	W	L	NR	Ab	RR	Pts
1	Bermuda	7	6	0	0	1	5.267	26
2	Bangladesh	7	4	1	0	2	3.225	20
3	Netherlands	7	3	1	0	3	3.604	18
4	Singapore	7	1	2	0	4	2.997	12
5	Fiji	7	1	3	1	2	3.479	10
6	East Africa	7	1	3	1	2	2.766	10
7	West Africa	7	0	2	2	3	3.611	10
8	Malaysia	7	0	4	2	1	3.611	6

Group stage
No.	Date	Team 1	Captain 1	Team 2	Captain 2	Venue	Result
ICCT 29	16 June	Gibraltar	Willie Scott	Kenya	Ramesh Patel	Old Silhillians Cricket Club Ground, Solihull	Kenya by 9 wickets
ICCT 30	16 June	Hong Kong	Peter Anderson	Papua New Guinea	Api Leka	Bournville Cricket Ground, Birmingham	Papua New Guinea by 4 wickets
ICCT 31	16 June	Zimbabwe	Duncan Fletcher	United States	Kamran Rasheed	Scorers, Shirley	Zimbabwe by 191 runs
ICCT 32	16 June	Bangladesh	Shafiq-ul-Haq	West Africa	Ewa Henshaw	Dartmouth Cricket Club Ground, West Bromwich	Bangladesh by 76 runs
ICCT 33	16 June	Bermuda	Colin Blades	Malaysia	Zainon Mat	Wednesbury Cricket Club Ground, Wednesbury	Bermuda by 284 runs
ICCT 34	16 June	Netherlands	Dik Abed	East Africa	Keith Arnold	Blossomfield Cricket Club Ground, Solihull	Netherlands by 23 runs
ICCT 34a	18 June	East Africa	Keith Arnold	Singapore	Stacey Muruthi	Gorway Ground, Walsall	Match abandoned
ICCT 35	18 June	Gibraltar	Willie Scott	United States	Kamran Rasheed	Alvechurch and Hopwood Cricket Club Ground, Alvechurch	No result
ICCT 36	18 June	Hong Kong	Peter Anderson	Israel	Hillel Awasker	Washford Fields, Studley	Hong Kong by 123 runs
ICCT 37	18 June	Zimbabwe	Duncan Fletcher	Kenya	Ramesh Patel	Fordhouses Cricket Club Ground, Wolverhampton	Zimbabwe by 120 runs
ICCT 38	18 June	Fiji	Alan Apted	Malaysia	Geoff Howarth	Stowe Lane, Colwall	No result
ICCT 38a	18 June	Netherlands	Dik Abed	West Africa	Ewa Henshaw	Rugby Cricket Club Ground, Rugby	Match abandoned
ICCT 39	21 June	Israel	Hillel Awasker	Papua New Guinea	Api Leka	Victoria Park, Cheltenham	Papua New Guinea by 9 wickets
ICCT 40	21 June	Bangladesh	Shafiq-ul-Haq	East Africa	Keith Arnold	Kennington Oval, London	Bangladesh by 26 runs
ICCT 40a	21 June	Canada	Richard Stevens	Hong Kong	Peter Anderson	Burton-on-Trent Cricket Club Ground, Burton-on-Trent	Match abandoned
ICCT 40b	21 June	Gibraltar	Willie Scott	Zimbabwe	Duncan Fletcher	Deansfield, Brewood	Match abandoned
ODI 41	21 June	Bermuda	Colin Blades	Fiji	Alan Apted	Bromsgrove Cricket Club Ground, Bromsgrove	Bermuda by 51 runs
ICCT 41a	21 June	Kenya	Ramesh Patel	United States	Kamran Rasheed	Lichfield Cricket Club Ground, Lichfield	Match abandoned
ICCT 41b	21 June	Netherlands	Dik Abed	Singapore	Stacey Muruthi	Fordhouses Cricket Club Ground, Wolverhampton	Match abandoned
ICCT 41c	23 June	Bangladesh	Shafiq-ul-Haq	Singapore	Stacey Muruthi	Lutterworth Cricket Club Ground, Lutterworth	Match abandoned
ICCT 41d	23 June	Canada	Richard Stevens	Gibraltar	Willie Scott	Nuneaton Cricket Club Ground, Nuneaton	Match abandoned
ICCT 41e	23 June	East Africa	Keith Arnold	Malaysia	Zainon Mat	High Town Cricket Ground, Bridgnorth	Match abandoned
ICCT 41f	23 June	Fiji	Alan Apted	West Africa	Ewa Henshaw	Barnt Green Cricket Club Ground, Barnt Green	Match abandoned
ICCT 42	23 June	Israel	Hillel Awasker	Kenya	Ramesh Patel	Pershore Cricket Club Ground, Pershore	No result
ICCT 42a	23 June	Papua New Guinea	Api Leka	United States	Kamran Rasheed	Warwick Cricket Club Ground, Warwick	Match abandoned
ICCT 42b	25 June	Bangladesh	Shafiq-ul-Haq	Fiji	Alan Apted	Ermont Way, Banbury	Match abandoned
ICCT 42c	25 June	Bermuda	Colin Blades	Netherlands	Dik Abed	Moseley Ashfield Cricket Club Ground, Moseley	Match abandoned
ICCT 43	25 June	Canada	Richard Stevens	Zimbabwe	Duncan Fletcher	Leamington Cricket Club Ground, Leamington Spa	No result
ICCT 44	25 June	Israel	Hillel Awasker	Gibraltar	Willie Scott	Wishaw Cricket Club Ground, Wishaw	No result
ICCT 44a	25 June	Hong Kong	Peter Anderson	United States	Kamran Rasheed	Aldridge Cricket Club Ground, Aldridge	Match abandoned
ICCT 44b	25 June	Singapore	Stacey Muruthi	West Africa	Ewa Henshaw	Wightwick and Finchfield Cricket Club Ground, Wolverhampton	England by 106 runs
ICCT 45	28 June	Papua New Guinea	Api Leka	Canada	Richard Stevens	Kenilworth Wardens Cricket Club Ground, Kenilworth	Papua New Guinea by 20 runs
ICCT 46	28 June	Gibraltar	Willie Scott	Hong Kong	Peter Anderson	Walmley Cricket Club Ground, Sutton Coldfield	Hong Kong by 8 wickets
ICCT 47	28 June	Israel	Hillel Awasker	Zimbabwe	Duncan Fletcher	Bloxwich Cricket Club Ground, Bloxwich	Zimbabwe by 9 wickets
ICCT 48	28 June	Bangladesh	Shafiq-ul-Haq	Malaysia	Zainon Mat	Chester Road North Ground, Kidderminster	Bangladesh by 1 run
ICCT 49	28 June	Singapore	Stacey Muruthi	Bermuda	Colin Blades	Allied Breweries Ground, Burton-on-Trent	Bermuda by 6 wickets
ICCT 50	28 June	East Africa	Keith Arnold	West Africa	Ewa Henshaw	Tipton Road, Dudley	No result
ICCT 51	28 June	Netherlands	Dik Abed	Fiji	Alan Apted	Leicester Road, Hinckley	Netherlands by 26 runs (revised)
ICCT 52	30 June	Canada	Richard Stevens	United States	Kamran Rasheed	Rectory Park, Sutton Coldfield	Canada by 138 runs
ICCT 53	30 June	Hong Kong	Peter Anderson	Kenya	Ramesh Patel	Streetly Cricket Club Ground, Sutton Coldfield	Kenya by 3 wickets
ICCT 54	30 June	Papua New Guinea	Api Leka	Zimbabwe	Duncan Fletcher	Wombourne Cricket Club Ground, Solihull	Zimbabwe by 9 wickets
ICCT 55	30 June	Bangladesh	Shafiq-ul-Haq	Bermuda	Colin Blades	Kings Heath Cricket Club Ground, Birmingham	Bermuda by 7 wickets
ICCT 56	30 June	East Africa	Keith Arnold	Fiji	Alan Apted	The Hough, Stafford	East Africa by 88 runs
ICCT 57	30 June	Malaysia	Zainon Mat	Singapore	Stacey Muruthi	Scorers, Shirley	Singapore by 6 wickets
ICCT 58	2 July	Canada	Richard Stevens	Kenya	Ramesh Patel	Haden Hill Park, Old Hill	Canada by 45 runs
ICCT 59	2 July	Gibraltar	Willie Scott	Papua New Guinea	Api Leka	Fairfield Road, Market Harborough	Papua New Guinea by 9 wickets
ICCT 60	2 July	Israel	Hillel Awasker	United States	Kamran Rasheed	Ermont Way, Banbury	United States by 8 wickets
ICCT 61	2 July	Netherlands	Dik Abed	Bangladesh	Shafiq-ul-Haq	Northampton Saints Cricket Club Ground, Northampton	Bangladesh by 6 wickets
ICCT 62	2 July	Bermuda	Colin Blades	East Africa	Keith Arnold	Stratford-upon-Avon Cricket Club Ground, Stratford-upon-Avon	Bermuda by 64 runs
ICCT 63	2 July	West Africa	Ewa Henshaw	Malaysia	Zainon Mat	Wroxeter and Uppington Cricket Club Ground, Wroxeter	No result
ICCT 64	5 July	Hong Kong	Peter Anderson	Zimbabwe	Duncan Fletcher	Loxley Close, Wellesbourne	Zimbabwe by 7 wickets
ICCT 64a	5 July	Canada	Richard Stevens	Israel	Hillel Awasker	Loxley Close, Wellesbourne	Canada by default
ICCT 65	5 July	Kenya	Ramesh Patel	Papua New Guinea	Api Leka	Tamworth Cricket Club Ground, Tamworth	Kenya by 37 runs
ICCT 66	5 July	West Africa	Ewa Henshaw	Bermuda	Colin Blades	Grange Road, Olton	Bermuda by 7 wickets
ICCT 67	5 July	Fiji	Inoke Tambualevu	Singapore	Stacey Muruthi	Solihull Cricket Club Ground, Solihull	Fiji by 14 runs
ICCT 68	5 July	Netherlands	Dik Abed	Malaysia	Zainon Mat	Redditch Cricket Club Ground, Redditch	Netherlands by 125 runs
Semi finals
No.	Date	Team 1	Captain 1	Team 2	Captain 2	Venue	Result
ICCT 69	7 July	Bangladesh	Shafiq-ul-Haq	Zimbabwe	Duncan Fletcher	Sandwell Park, West Bromwich	Zimbabwe by 8 wickets
ICCT 70	7 July	Papua New Guinea	Api Leka	Bermuda	Colin Blades	Mitchells and Butlers' Ground, Birmingham	Bermuda by 6 wickets
Third place
No.	Date	Team 1	Captain 1	Team 2	Captain 2	Venue	Result
ICCT 71	9 July	Bangladesh	Shafiq-ul-Haq	Papua New Guinea	Api Leka	Bournville Cricket Ground, Bournville	Papua New Guinea by 3 wickets
Final
No.	Date	Team 1	Captain 1	Team 2	Captain 2	Venue	Result
ICCT 72	10 July	Bermuda	Colin Blades	Zimbabwe	Duncan Fletcher	Grace Road, Leicester	Zimbabwe by 5 wickets

== July ==
=== Pakistan in England ===
Prudential Trophy ODI series
No.	Date	Home captain	Away captain	Venue	Result
ODI 154	17 July	Bob Willis	Imran Khan	Trent Bridge, Nottingham	England by 7 wickets
ODI 155	19 July	Bob Willis	Imran Khan	Old Trafford, Manchester	England by 73 runs
Test series
No.	Date	Home captain	Away captain	Venue	Result
Test 931	29 Jul–1 August	Bob Willis	Imran Khan	Edgbaston, Birmingham	England by 113 runs
Test 932	12–16 August	David Gower	Imran Khan	Lord's, London	Pakistan by 10 wickets
Test 933	26–31 August	Bob Willis	Imran Khan	Headingley, Leeds	England by 3 wickets
