= Stephen Perryman =

English cricketer

Personal information
- Full name: Stephen Peter Perryman
- Born: 22 October 1955 (age 71); Yardley, Birmingham, England
- Batting: Right-handed
- Bowling: Right-arm medium

Domestic team information
- Years: Team
- 1974–1981: Warwickshire
- 1982–1983: Worcestershire
- 1988: Staffordshire

Career statistics
Competition	FC	LA
Matches	156	130
Runs scored	872	156
Batting average	9.27	12.00
100s/50s	0/0	0/0
Top score	43	19*
Balls bowled	25,156	6,375
Wickets	358	135
Bowling average	31.66	30.88
5 wickets in innings	19	0
10 wickets in match	3	N/A
Best bowling	7/49	4/17
Catches/stumpings	58/0	25/0
- Source: CricketArchive, 25 November 2008

Stephen Peter Perryman (born 22 October 1955) is a former English cricketer who played first-class and List A cricket for Warwickshire and Worcestershire during the 1970s and 1980s.

Perryman caught the eye at the age of 17 in 1973, when he took 6/44 in 23 overs for Warwickshire Young Amateurs as they beat their Buckinghamshire counterparts in the Hilda Overy Trophy. He had played for Warwickshire's Second XI before the year was out, and appeared several more times in early 1974 before making his first-class debut in early July against Cambridge University at Nuneaton; it proved to be rather a frustrating debut as he neither batted nor bowled in a game in which little play was possible. That was his only first-team appearance of the season, although he did play for England Young Cricketers in two Youth Test matches against West Indies Young Cricketers a few weeks later.

In 1975, however, Perryman played a full part in the season, finishing with 49 first-class wickets at just over 30 and 22 List A victims at a little over 32. He did not play quite so often the following year, but nevertheless managed three five-wicket hauls in first-class innings. In 1977 he enjoyed a successful time in three-day cricket especially: his 73 first-class wickets were his highest season's aggregate, and included 11 wickets against Middlesex in August. Wisden was impressed, saying that he had "more than confirmed the promise of the previous season" and had continued "to mature in the Cartwright mould".

Perryman had another fairly successful summer in 1978, claiming exactly 50 first-class wickets. In the middle of June he took 12 wickets in the match against Lancashire, and a little over two months later he recorded his career best when he took a match-winning second-innings 7/49 against Hampshire. Earlier in the season he had also recorded his List A best, albeit against lesser opposition in the form of Minor Counties West in the Benson & Hedges Cup. He took 51 first-class wickets in 1979, also claiming 26 List A victims (his most), but in 1980 he did not become a first-team regular until near the end of the season.

In the 1981 season Perryman averaged 43 in first-class cricket and 38 in the one-day game, his wicket totals roughly halving from 1980 in both forms of the game. At the end of the year he left Edgbaston and joined Worcestershire, where he played for two seasons. He did have some successes at his new county, such as the 6/49 he managed against Lancashire in August 1982, but he could never quite establish himself as a true regular in the side, and in 1983 he was almost absent from one-day cricket, bowling just 13 overs.

He played his final Worcestershire game, against Essex, in late August, rounding off his Warwickshire career with the single wicket of former West Indies Test player Norbert Phillip. After that, Perryman was seen no more at first-class level, though he did appear several times for Staffordshire in 1988, playing one List A match for the minor county when he turned out against Surrey in the NatWest Trophy in June.
