= Owen Williams (South African cricketer) =

South African cricketer

Personal information
- Full name: Owen Leslie Williams
- Born: 8 April 1932 (age 94); Claremont, Cape Province, South Africa
- Batting: Right-handed
- Bowling: Slow left-arm orthodox

Domestic team information
- Years: Team
- 1971/72: Western Province
- 1967: Warwickshire

Career statistics
Competition	First-class
Matches	3
Runs scored	21
Batting average	10.50
100s/50s	–/–
Top score	9*
Balls bowled	533
Wickets	5
Bowling average	36.60
5 wickets in innings	–
10 wickets in match	–
Best bowling	2/36
Catches/stumpings	1/–
- Source: Cricinfo, 13 July 2012

Owen Leslie Williams (born 8 April 1932) is a former South African cricketer. Williams was a right-handed batsman who bowled slow left-arm orthodox. He was born at Claremont, Cape Province.

Williams made his first-class debut in England for Warwickshire against Scotland at Edgbaston in 1967. He later made two further first-class appearances in South Africa for Western Province, against Transvaal in December 1971 and Natal in January 1972. In his three first-class matches, he took a total of 5 wickets at an average of 36.60, with best figures of 2/36. With the bat, he scored 21 runs at a batting average of 10.50, with a high score of 9 not out.

In an attempt to make South African cricket more acceptable to world opinion and to ensure the tour to Australia in 1971-72 went ahead, the South African cricket authorities offered Williams and another non-white player, Dik Abed, a place on the touring team. However, not only did the South African government refuse to allow the initiative to proceed, but Williams and Abed also refused to be a part of what they considered a token gesture.
