= Courtaulds Ground =

Cricket ground in Warwickshire, England

Coordinates: 52.42801°N 1.50468°W

Ground information
- Location: Coventry, Warwickshire
- Establishment: 1946 (first recorded match)

Team information
Warwickshire	(1946-1983)
- As of 28 August 2010; Source: Ground profile

Courtaulds Ground was a cricket ground in Coventry, Warwickshire. The ground was owned by Courtaulds. The first recorded match on the ground was in 1949, when it hosted its first first-class match between Warwickshire and Hampshire in the County Championship. From 1949 to 1982, the ground played host to 56 first-class matches, the last of which was between Warwickshire and Middlesex.

The ground also hosted List-A matches, the first of which was between Warwickshire and Leicestershire in the 1972 Benson and Hedges Cup. From 1972 to 1983, the ground held 8 List-A matches, the last of which was between Warwickshire and Derbyshire in the 1983 John Player Special League.

As the ground was no longer used for cricket, it fell into a state of disrepair. The pavilion, built at a cost of £15,000 in 1935, became derelict and the outfield overgrown. In 2018, the ground was demolished and replaced by a housing estate called Mercia Gardens.
