= The Butts Ground =

Former cricket ground in Coventry, England

- Rover Ground

Ground information
- Location: Coventry, Warwickshire
- Coordinates: 52.4049°N 1.5252°W
- Establishment: 1866 (first recorded match)

Team information
Warwickshire	(1925-1930)
- As of 28 August 2010; Source: Ground profile

The Butts Ground was a cricket ground in Coventry, Warwickshire. The first recorded match on the ground was in 1872, when Coventry played a United South of England Eleven. The first county match held at the ground came in 1882 when Warwickshire played Staffordshire, although this match was not first-class. Warwickshire used the ground for first-class cricket from 1925 to 1930, playing the final first-class match held at the ground against Hampshire. The site is today occupied by buildings.
