= Morris Motors Ground =

Cricket ground in Coventry, Warwickshire, England

Coordinates: 52.43270°N 1.48091°W

Ground information
- Location: Coventry, Warwickshire
- Country: England
- Establishment: 1931 (first recorded match)

Team information
| Warwickshire | (1931-1932) |
- As of 28 August 2010; Source: Ground profile

The Morris Motors Ground was a cricket ground in Coventry, Warwickshire. The ground was owned by Morris Motors Limited, which operated in Coventry. The first recorded match on the ground was in 1931, when Warwickshire played Northamptonshire, which was also the first first-class match held at the ground. The following season the ground held its second and final first-class match, which was between Warwickshire and Leicestershire.

Additionally, the ground held a single Minor Counties Championship match when the Warwickshire Second XI played Durham in 1932. Located along Bell Green Road, today the ground is covered by housing.
