= Bournville Cricket Ground =

Cricket ground in Birmingham, England

Coordinates: 52°25′38.92″N 1°56′02.38″W

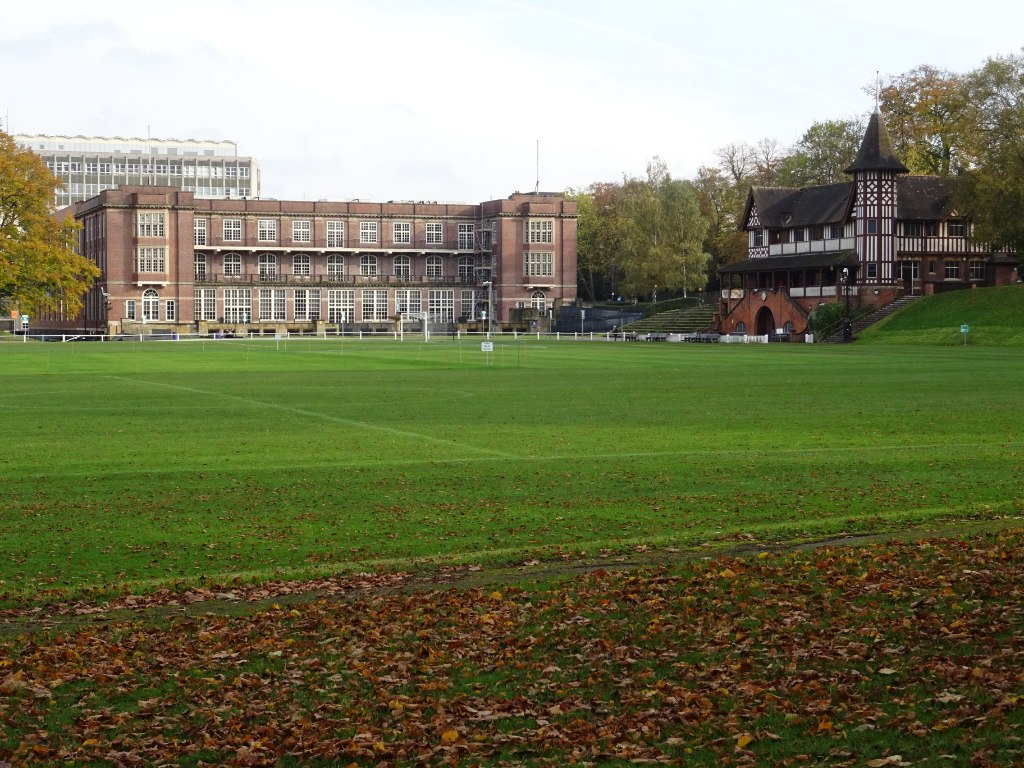
Bournville Cricket Ground with the Cadbury factory (left) and the Men's Pavilion (right)

The Bournville Cricket Ground in Birmingham, England was used for first-class cricket by Worcestershire County Cricket Club on two occasions. In 1910 they drew with Essex, and the following year they beat Surrey by two wickets.

Warwickshire played Second XI matches here for a few years in the 1960s and 1970s. The ground also hosted four games in the ICC Trophy in 1979 (1), 1982 (2) and 1986 (1).

The ground is now home to Bournville Cricket Club during the summer, who currently compete in the Warwickshire Cricket League.

== Records ==
=== First-class ===
- Highest team total: 301/8 by Worcestershire v Surrey, 1911
- Lowest team total: 198 by Worcestershire v Essex, 1910; and by Worcestershire v Surrey, 1911
- Highest individual innings: 107 by Frederick Pearson for Worcestershire v Surrey, 1911
- Best bowling in an innings: 5/53 by Thomas Rushby for Surrey v Worcestershire, 1911
