= Dik Abed =

South African-born Dutch cricketer

Personal information
- Full name: Sulaiman Abed
- Born: October 22, 1944; District Six, Cape Town, South Africa
- Died: January 19, 2018 (aged 73); The Hague, Netherlands
- Role: All-rounder

International information
- National side: Netherlands
- Source: Cricinfo, 23 November 2026

Sulaiman "Dik" Abed (22 October 1944 – 19 January 2018) was a South African-born cricketer, who played professionally in England and later captained the Netherlands.

== Life and career ==
Abed was born to a Cape Malay family in District Six, Cape Town, South Africa. He was one of five brothers. He grew up playing club cricket in the Western Province Cricket Association, which at the time was unsegregated, but was ineligible to play at provincial level because of his race during the apartheid era. He represented the Western Province non-white team before moving to England in 1967 to see if he could establish himself as a professional in league cricket.

Abed played as Enfield's professional in the Lancashire League for 10 seasons, from 1967 to 1976, scoring 5,271 runs at an average of 27.17 and taking 855 wickets at 10.27 with his fast-medium bowling. In 1968, when Enfield won the championship for the first time in 25 years, he took 120 wickets at an average of 9.30 and made 458 runs at 20.90. When Enfield won again in 1971, Abed took 101 wickets at 7.99 and made 662 runs at 28.78. He resisted offers from other league clubs and a first-class county and stayed with Enfield. The counties may also have been reluctant to engage him in the wake of the D'Oliveira affair. The Warwickshire coach Alan Oakman told Abed the authorities had instructed him not to sign Abed for the county.

In an attempt to make South African cricket more acceptable to world opinion and to ensure the tour to Australia in 1971–72 went ahead, the South African cricket authorities offered Abed and another non-white player, Owen Williams, a place on the touring team. However, not only did the South African National Party government refuse to allow the initiative to proceed, but Abed and Williams also refused to be a part of what they considered a token gesture.

After marrying a Dutch woman, Abed moved to the Netherlands in 1977 and became a Dutch citizen in 1981. He played club cricket for HBS Craeyenhout, leading the club to three national titles, and for VRA Amsterdam. He captained the Netherlands team in the 1982 ICC Trophy. He eventually had to retire from cricket due to an eye injury, but remained active in the game. He retired to an aged-care home across from the HBS grounds. He died in The Hague on 19 January 2018, aged 73.
