= Stacey Muruthi =

Singaporean cricketer

Stacey Muruthi or Sreerangam Muruthi (born 31 May 1952) is a cricketer from Singapore and a former captain of the Singapore national cricket team.

Muruthi had made significant contributions to cricket in Singapore: He holds the record for playing 45 consecutive years in the Singapore Cricket Association (SCA) league since 1968, at the age of 60.

Muruthi first played for the Combined Schools, a Singapore Cricket Association Division 2 team in 1968. Two years later, he was playing for the national team, becoming one of the youngest national cricket player, while still a student at Victoria School, at the age of 17. He was on the national team until 2001, including spells as captain in 1976, 1979–1989 and 1994. His sons, Peter and James, are also Singapore cricket internationals.

Muruthi's most notable performance came on 21 February 1973, when playing for a Singapore Selection, he took 4/55 against the Pakistan side in a friendly at the Padang. One of his four wickets was Pakistan captain and batting ace Majid Khan. Zaheer Abbas, regarded as one of the finest batsman produced by Pakistan, commented that "Muruthi, once he masters the art of varying his flight and speed can find a place in any country side."

== Statistics ==
Muruthi played 23 ICC Trophy matches between 1979 and 1997, scoring 190 runs at an average of 15.83 and taking 22 wickets at an average of 25.63.

== Personal life ==
Muruthi's sons Peter and James Muruthi, nephews Anish, Navin and Prasheen Param, and niece Diviya G K have also represented Singapore in international cricket.
