= Griff and Coton Ground =

Cricket ground in England

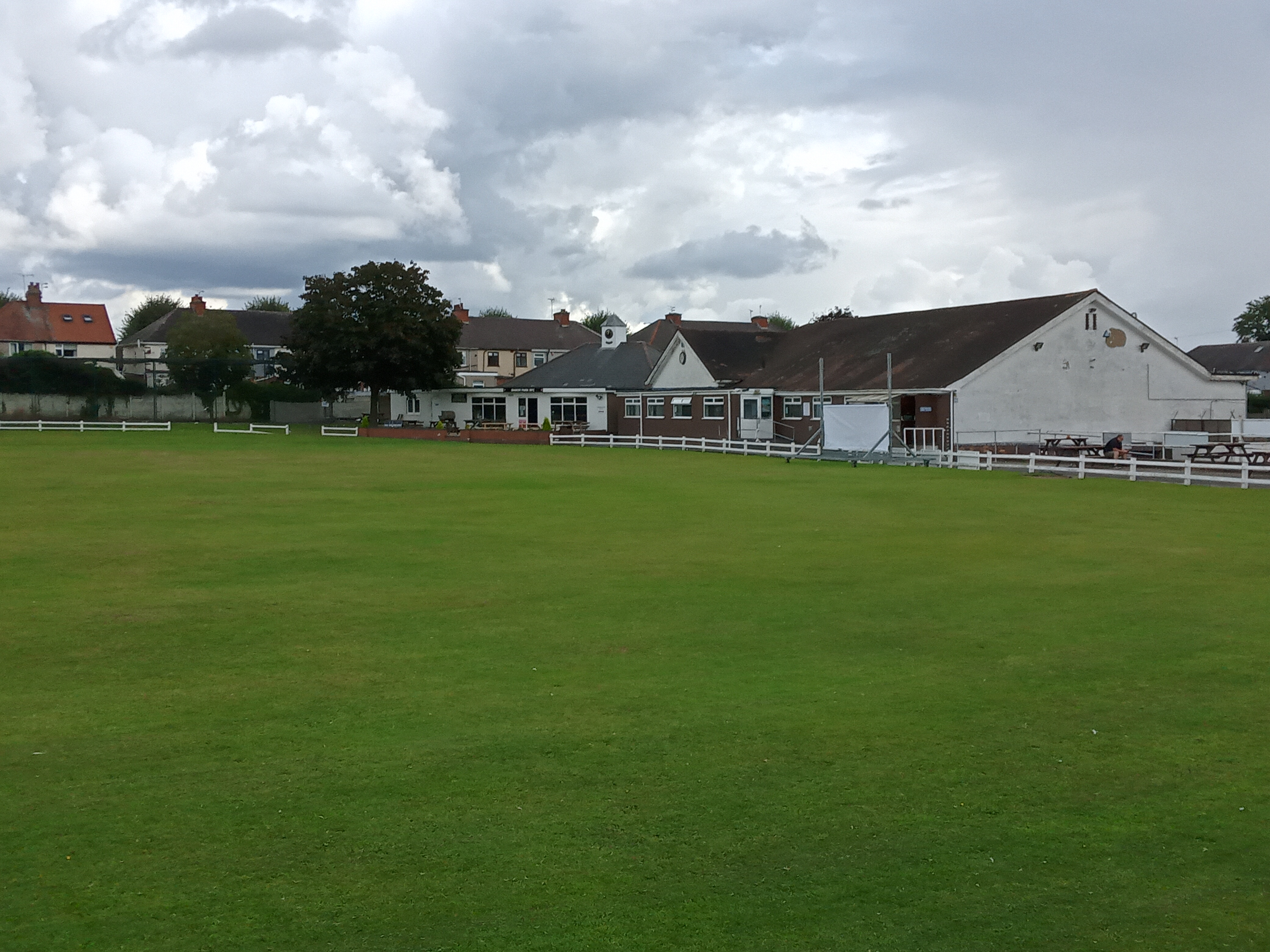
- The pavilion and clubhouse at the Griff and Coton Ground
- Interactive map of Griff and Coton Ground

Ground information
- Location: Nuneaton, Warwickshire
- Country: England
- Coordinates: 52.5147°N 1.4777°W
- Establishment: 1909
- End names
- Scoreboard End; Heath End Road End

Team information
| Warwickshire | (1930–1989) |
- As of 28 August 2010; Source: Ground profile

The Griff and Coton Ground is a cricket ground in Nuneaton, Warwickshire. The ground is located off the Heath End Road and forms part of a wider sports and social club. It played host to first-class and List A cricket matches for Warwickshire County Cricket Club between 1930 and 1989.

== History ==
The Griff and Coton Ground is located in the former village of Chilvers Coton, now a suburb of Nuneaton. It was on land donated by Sir Francis Newdegate that a cricket ground was constructed in 1909. The ground, then known to locals as Chilvers Coton Ground, was bought by the Griff Colliery for the benefit of its coal miners. During the early years of ground sheep were allowed to graze on the ground. Warwickshire County Cricket Club first used the ground in 1930, playing a first-class match against Leicestershire in the County Championship, having previously played in Nuneaton at Nuneaton Cricket Club Ground. Warwickshire played four first-class matches there in the 1930s, but did not return to the ground until 1960. Their return was largely down to F. G. Watson, a local cricket enthusiast and building contractor, and a £1,000 donation from the Cathedral and Church Shops Association (CCSA) which funded improvements at the ground. The colliery closed in the same year that county cricket returned to ground, though it remained under the ownership of the miners' social welfare club. Warwickshire played one match per year there from 1960 to 1967 and again from 1977 to 1989. In addition to playing first-class cricket there, Warwickshire also played three List A one-day matches there in 1969, 1979 and 1980, though the 1979 match was abandoned. The ground was selected as one of the host venues for the 1986 ICC Trophy, a World Cup qualifying competition for associate members of the International Cricket Council. It hosted two games, with Bermuda featuring in both against Hong Kong and Papua New Guinea.

According to Wisden's Guide to County Cricket Grounds, which was published in 1989, the facilities at the ground included permanent buildings in the form of a cricket pavilion, separate pavilion and social club. A scoreboard, with a plaque commemorating Jack Smart affixed to it, and a groundsmans shed were also present. The ground also contained a bowling green and tennis courts. The record attendance at the ground came in the 1969 Player's County League one-day match when 6,000 attended the match against Lancashire. The ground is used in club cricket by the Griff and Coton Cricket Club. It is the subject of a painting by the artist and former cricketer Jack Russell.

== Records ==
=== First-class ===
- Highest team total: 446 all out by Warwickshire v Gloucestershire, 1982
- Lowest team total: 34 all out by Nottinghamshire v Warwickshire, 1969
- Highest individual innings: 221 not out by Bill Alley for Somerset v Warwickshire, 1961
- Best bowling in an innings: 8-47 by Alan Brown, for Kent v Warwickshire, 1963
- Best bowling in a match: 10-97 by Alan Brown, as above

=== List A ===
- Highest team total: 234 for 5 by Warwickshire v Northamptonshire, 1980
- Lowest team total: 153 all out by Warwickshire v Lancashire, 1969
- Highest individual innings: 81 by Dennis Amiss for Warwickshire v Northamptonshire, 1980
- Best bowling in an innings: 3-31 by Tom Cartwright, for Warwickshire v Lancashire, 1969
