= Stratford-upon-Avon Cricket Club Ground =

Cricket ground in Warwickshire

Coordinates: 52.18877°N 1.70196°W

Stratford-upon-Avon Cricket Club
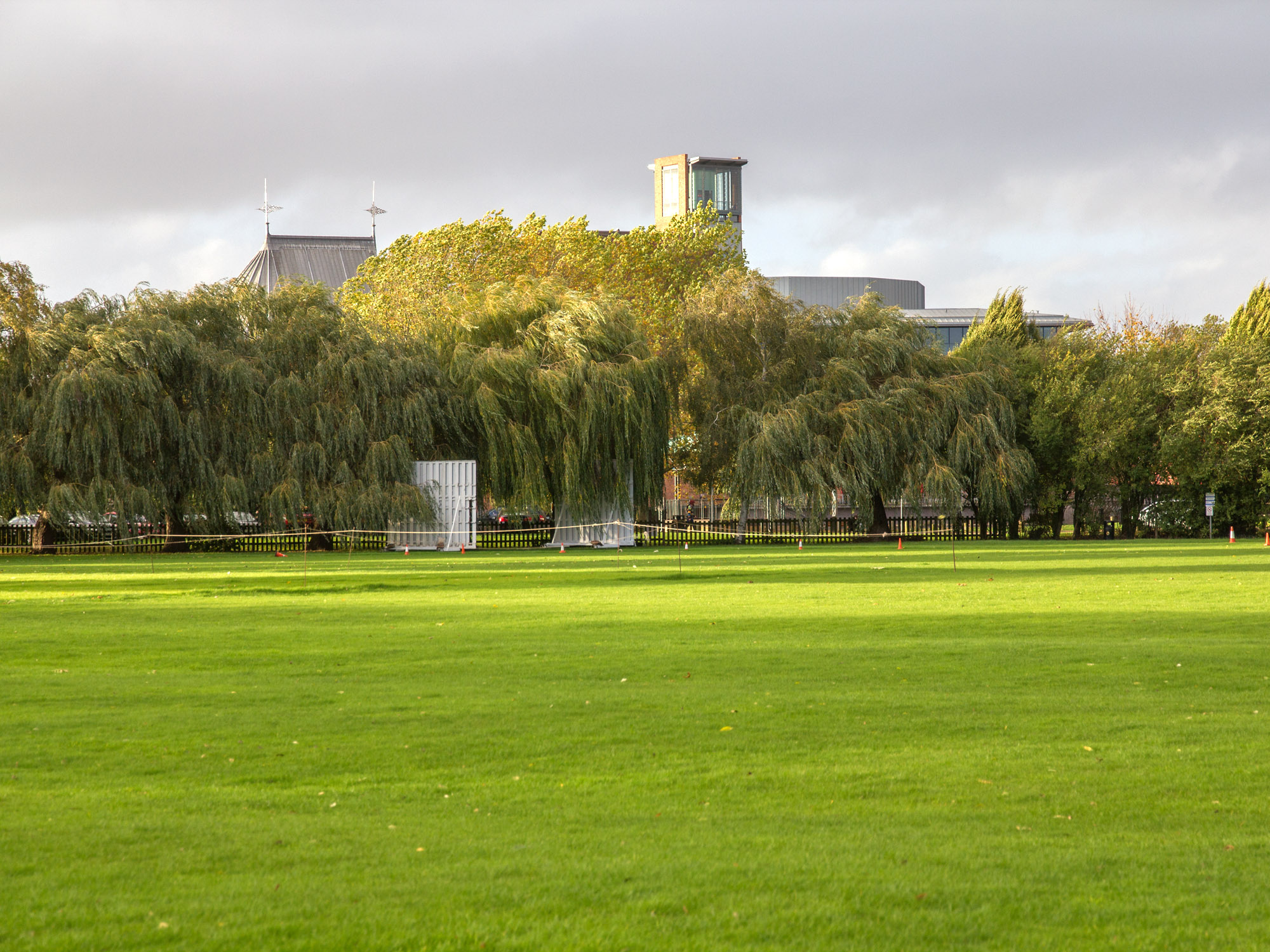

Ground information
- Location: Stratford-upon-Avon, Warwickshire
- Establishment: 1880 (first recorded match)

International information
- First WODI: 21 August 2005: England v Australia
- Last WODI: 3 July 2009: England v Australia

Team information
Warwickshire	(1951 & 2004–2005)
Warwickshire Cricket Board	(2000)
- As of 6 September 2020; Source: Ground profile

Stratford-upon-Avon Cricket Ground is a cricket ground in Stratford-upon-Avon, Warwickshire. The ground is next to the River Avon and also located next to the Royal Shakespeare Theatre, on Swans Nest Lane.

The first recorded match on the ground was in 1880, when Stratford-upon-Avon played a United South of England Eleven. Warwickshire first used the ground for first-class cricket in 1951 when they played Oxford University. First-class cricket next returned to the ground in 2004 when Warwickshire played Lancashire. The final first-class match held at the ground to date came in the Stratford Festival of Cricket in 2005, when Warwickshire played Hampshire; a Hampshire team which featured such names as Shane Warne and Kevin Pietersen.

The ground has also held 2 List-A matches. The first came in the 2000 NatWest Trophy when the Warwickshire Cricket Board played Kent. The second List-A match came in 2005 when Warwickshire played Scotland in the 2005 totesport League.

Additionally, the ground has hosted 3 Women's One Day Internationals. The first came in 2005 and saw England women play Australia women. The second came in 2007 and was between England women and New Zealand women. The final Women's ODI to date came in 2009 and was between England women and Australia women.

It also holds several high-profile fixtures throughout the year including County Second XI Cricket, Summer Solstice Cricket and in June 2010 it hosted a match featuring the Lord's Taverners. In local domestic cricket, the ground is the home venue of Stratford-upon-Avon Cricket Club who used to play in the Birmingham and District Premier League Division One and now play in the Warwickshire League Premier Division.
