= Leamington Cricket Club Ground =

Cricket ground in Warwickshire

Coordinates: 52.30090°N 1.53428°W

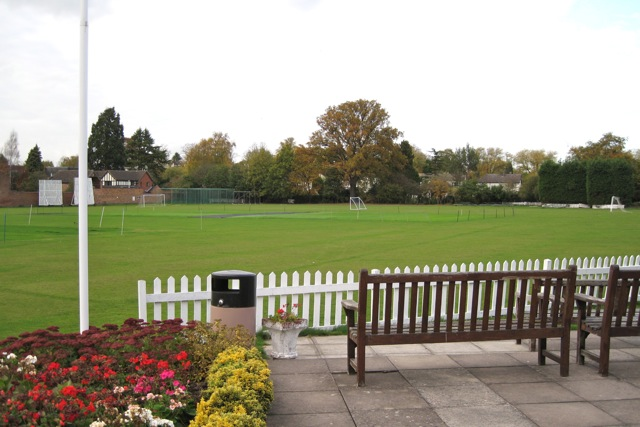

Ground information
- Location: Leamington Spa, Warwickshire
- Establishment: 1900 (first recorded match)

Team information
Warwickshire	(1905 & 1908-1910)
- As of 28 August 2010; Source: Ground profile

Leamington Cricket Club Ground is a cricket ground in Leamington Spa, Warwickshire.

== History ==
The first recorded match on the ground was in 1900, when Leamington played Stratford-upon-Avon. The ground hosted its first first-class match in 1905, when Warwickshire played Hampshire. In 1908, the ground held its second first-class match, which was between Warwickshire and Somerset. The third first-class match held on the ground came in 1909 between Warwickshire and Hampshire, with the final first-class match at the ground between Warwickshire and Sussex in 1910.

Additionally, the ground held several Second XI Championship matches for the Warwickshire Second XI between 1950 and 2007.

In 1979, the ground hosted its first ICC Trophy match in the ICC Trophy between the Netherlands and the United States. In the 1982 ICC Trophy it held a match between Zimbabwe and Canada and finally in the 1986 ICC Trophy between Hong Kong and the United States.

In local domestic cricket, the ground is the home venue of Leamington Cricket Club who play in the Birmingham and District Premier League.
