= Nuneaton Cricket Club Ground =

Cricket ground in Nuneaton, England

Coordinates: 52.53034°N 1.46591°W

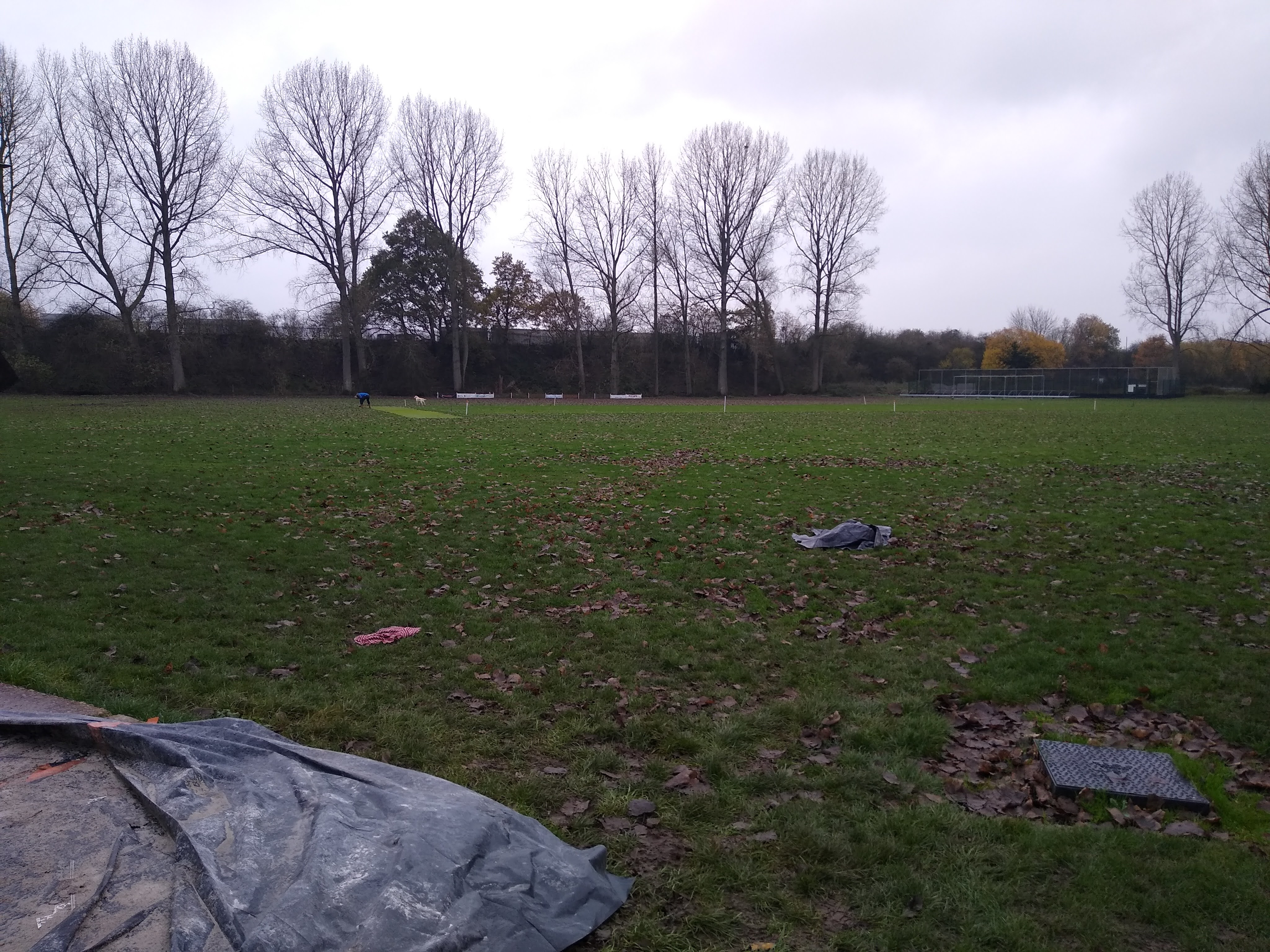
- Nuneaton Cricket Club Ground in 2022

Ground information
- Location: Nuneaton, Warwickshire
- Establishment: 1880 (first recorded match)

Team information
Warwickshire	(1912–1914)
- As of 28 August 2010; Source: Ground profile

Nuneaton Cricket Club Ground is a cricket ground in Nuneaton, Warwickshire. The first recorded match played by Nuneaton Cricket Club was in 1826. In 1880 Nuneaton played a United South of England Eleven. The ground hosted its first first-class match in 1912, when Warwickshire played Leicestershire. The following season the ground held its second first-class match, which was between Warwickshire and Gloucestershire. The third and final first-class match held on the ground came in 1914 when Warwickshire played Sussex.

Nuneaton won the Warwickshire League Premier Division in 2016 under the captaincy of Lee Mcneill.

Additionally, the ground held several Second XI Championship matches for the Warwickshire Second XI between 1959 and 1964. In 1982, the ground hosted a single match in the ICC Trophy between Canada and Gibraltar.

In local domestic cricket, the ground is the home venue of Nuneaton Cricket Club.
