= Warwickshire =

County of England

- Non-metropolitan and ceremonial county
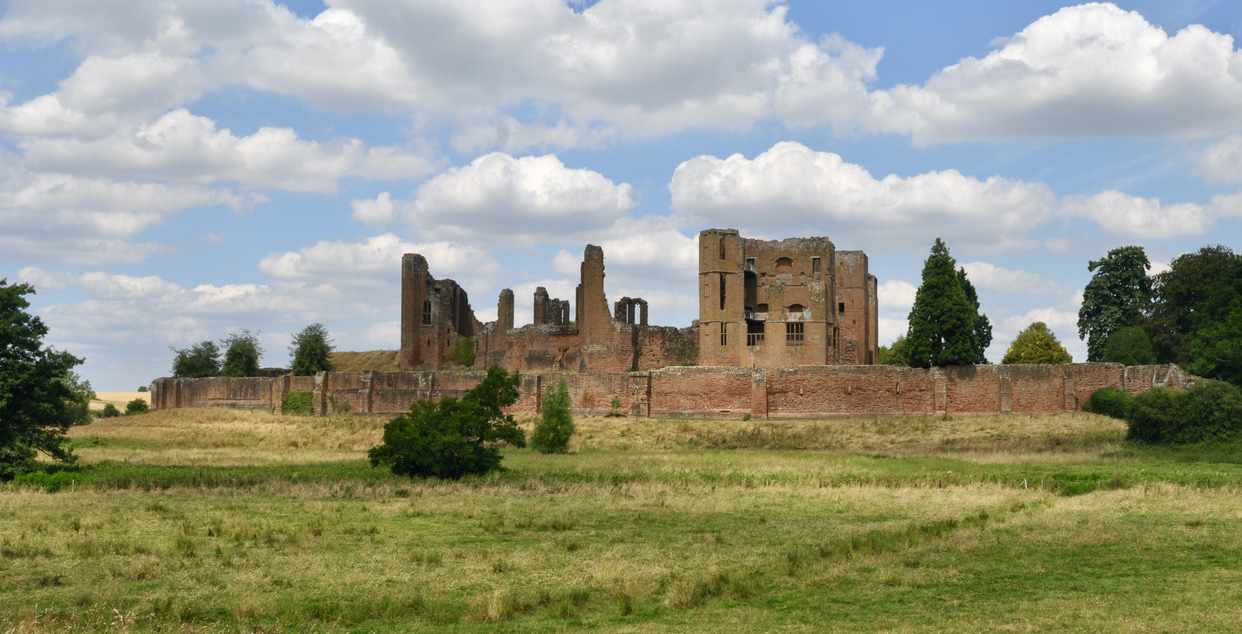
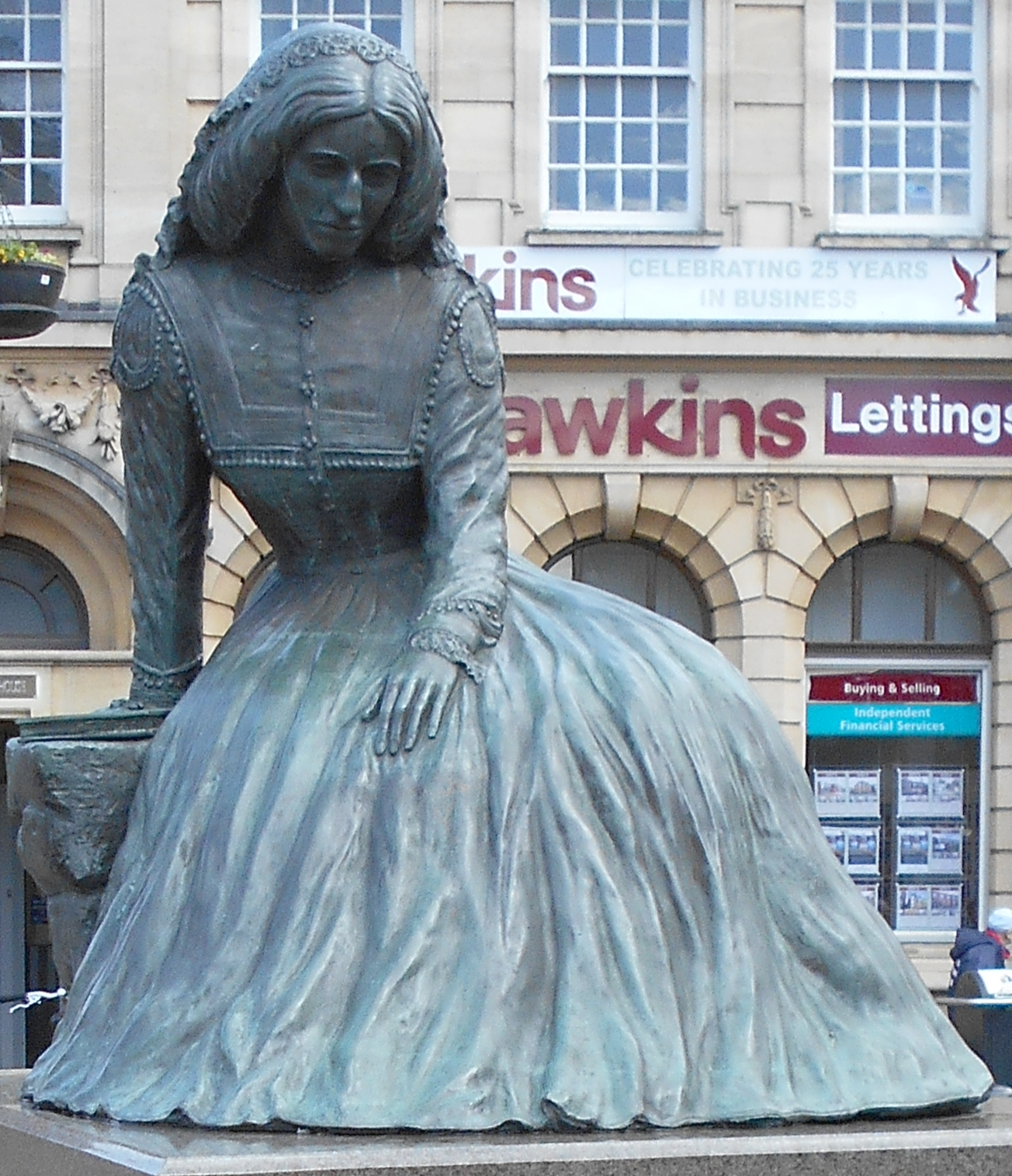
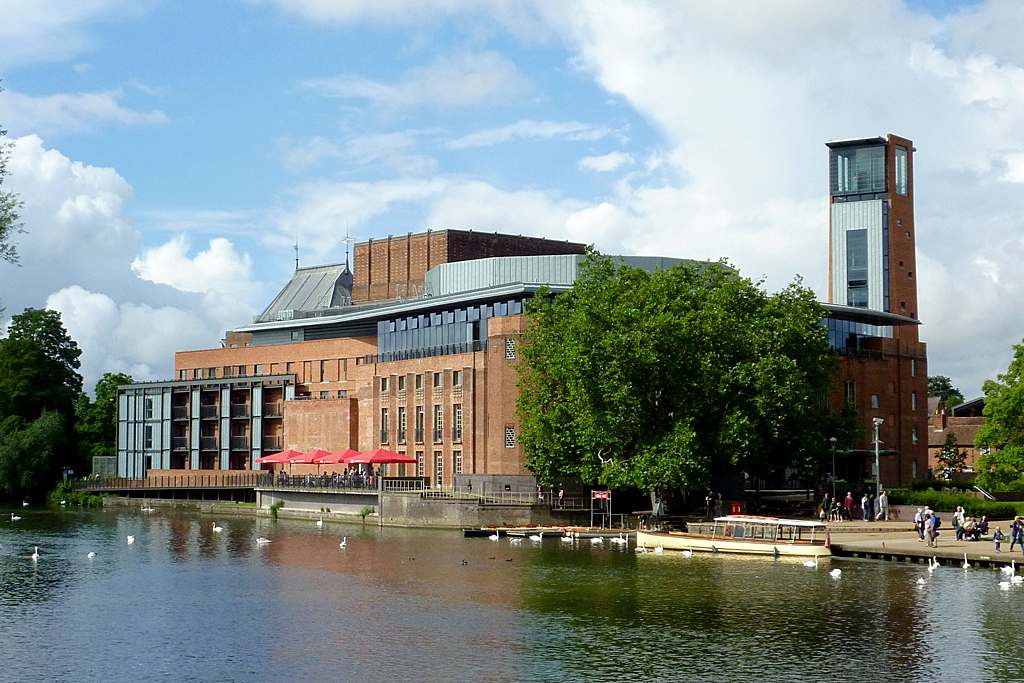
- Kenilworth Castle; statue of George Eliot, Nuneaton; and Royal Shakespeare Theatre, Stratford-upon-Avon

- Sovereign state: United Kingdom
- Constituent country: England
- Region: West Midlands
- Established: Ancient
- Time zone: UTC+0 (GMT)
  - Summer (DST): UTC+1 (BST)
- UK Parliament: 6 MPs
- Ceremonial county
- Lord Lieutenant: Timothy Cox
- High Sheriff: Susan Rasmussen
- Area: 1,975 km^{2} (763 sq mi)
  - Rank: 31st of 48
- Population (2024): 632,207
  - Rank: 37th of 48
  - Density: 320/km^{2} (830/sq mi)
- Non-metropolitan county
- County council: Warwickshire County Council
- Control: No overall control
- Admin HQ: Warwick
- Area: 1,975 km^{2} (763 sq mi)
  - Rank: 17th of 21
- Population (2025): 644,021
  - Rank: 19th of 21
  - Density: 326/km^{2} (840/sq mi)
- ISO 3166-2: GB-WAR
- GSS code: E10000031
- ITL: TLG13
- Website: warwickshire.gov.uk
- Districts
- Districts of Warwickshire
- Districts: List: North Warwickshire; Nuneaton and Bedworth; Rugby; Stratford-on-Avon; Warwick

Warwickshire (/ˈwɒrɪkʃər, -ʃɪər/; abbreviated Warks) is a ceremonial county in the West Midlands of England. It is bordered by Staffordshire and Leicestershire to the north, Northamptonshire to the east, Oxfordshire and Gloucestershire to the south, and Worcestershire and the West Midlands county to the west. The largest settlement is Nuneaton.

The county is largely rural, with an area of 763 sq mi (1,980 km^{2}) and an estimated population of 632,207 in 2024. It contains a number of towns, including Nuneaton and Bedworth in the north-east, Rugby in the east, Stratford-upon-Avon in the south-west, and Warwick and Leamington Spa adjacent to each other in the centre. For local government purposes, Warwickshire is a non-metropolitan county with five districts. The county historically included the city of Coventry and the area to its west, including Sutton Coldfield, Solihull and the city centre of Birmingham.

Warwickshire is a flat, lowland county, but its far south contains part of the Cotswolds, which have been designated a national landscape. The River Avon, a major tributary of the Severn, flows through the south of the county.

The region was part of Roman Britain and later the Roman road called Watling Street became the boundary between the Anglo-Saxon kingdom of Mercia and the Danelaw. The county was relatively settled during the rest of the Middle Ages and early modern period; Coventry developed as a major centre of the textiles trade. The playwright William Shakespeare was born in Stratford-upon-Avon in 1564, living much of his life there, and the Gunpowder Plot of 1605 was planned near Snitterfield. During the Industrial Revolution, the Warwickshire Coalfield was exploited and Coventry and the west of the county became manufacturing centres; Leamington Spa developed as a tourist resort at the same time. The Victorian novelist Mary Ann Evans, better known as George Eliot, was born just outside Nuneaton in 1819.

== Geography ==
Warwickshire is bordered by Leicestershire to the northeast, Staffordshire to the northwest, Worcestershire and the West Midlands to the west, Northamptonshire to the east and southeast, Gloucestershire to the southwest and Oxfordshire to the south. The northern tip of the county is only 3 miles (5 km) from the Derbyshire border. An average-sized English county covering an area of 1,975 km^{2} (760 sq mi), it runs some 56 miles (90 km) north to south.

The majority of Warwickshire's population live in the north and centre of the county. The market towns of northern and eastern Warwickshire were industrialised in the 19th century, and include Atherstone, Bedworth, Coleshill, Nuneaton, and Rugby. Major industries included coal mining, textiles, engineering and cement production, but heavy industry is in decline, being replaced by distribution centres, light to medium industry and services. Of the northern and eastern towns, Nuneaton and Rugby (as the birthplace of rugby football) are best known outside of Warwickshire. The prosperous towns of central and western Warwickshire, including Leamington Spa, Warwick, Stratford-upon-Avon, Kenilworth, Alcester, Southam and Wellesbourne, harbour tourism, gaming and services as major employment sectors.

The north of the county, bordering Staffordshire and Leicestershire, is mildly undulating countryside (rising to 178m / 581 ft near Hartshill) and the northernmost village, No Man's Heath, is only 34 miles (55 km) south of the Peak District National Park's southernmost point.

The south of the county is largely rural and sparsely populated, and includes a very small area of the Cotswolds, at the border with northeast Gloucestershire. The plain between the outlying Cotswolds and the Edgehill escarpment is known as the Vale of Red Horse. The only town in the south of Warwickshire is Shipston-on-Stour. The highest point in the county, at 261 m (856 ft), is Ebrington Hill, again on the border with Gloucestershire, grid reference SP187426 at the county's southwest extremity.

There are no cities in Warwickshire since both Coventry and Birmingham were incorporated into the West Midlands county in 1974 and are now metropolitan authorities in themselves. According to the 2021 United Kingdom census, the largest towns (+20,000 pop.) in Warwickshire were: Nuneaton (pop. 88,815), Rugby (78,120), Leamington Spa (51,310), Bedworth (31,090), Warwick (36,680), Stratford-upon-Avon (28,120), and Kenilworth (22,235).

=== Arden and Felden ===
Much of western Warwickshire, including the area now forming part of Coventry, Solihull and Birmingham, was covered by the ancient Forest of Arden (most of which was cut down to provide fuel for industrialisation). Thus the names of a number of places in the central-western part of Warwickshire end with the phrase "-in-Arden", such as Henley-in-Arden, Hampton-in-Arden and Tanworth-in-Arden. The remaining area, not part of the forest, was called the Felden – from fielden - and is now an undulating and agricultural landscape, through which the rivers Avon and Leam flow.

=== Historic county boundaries ===
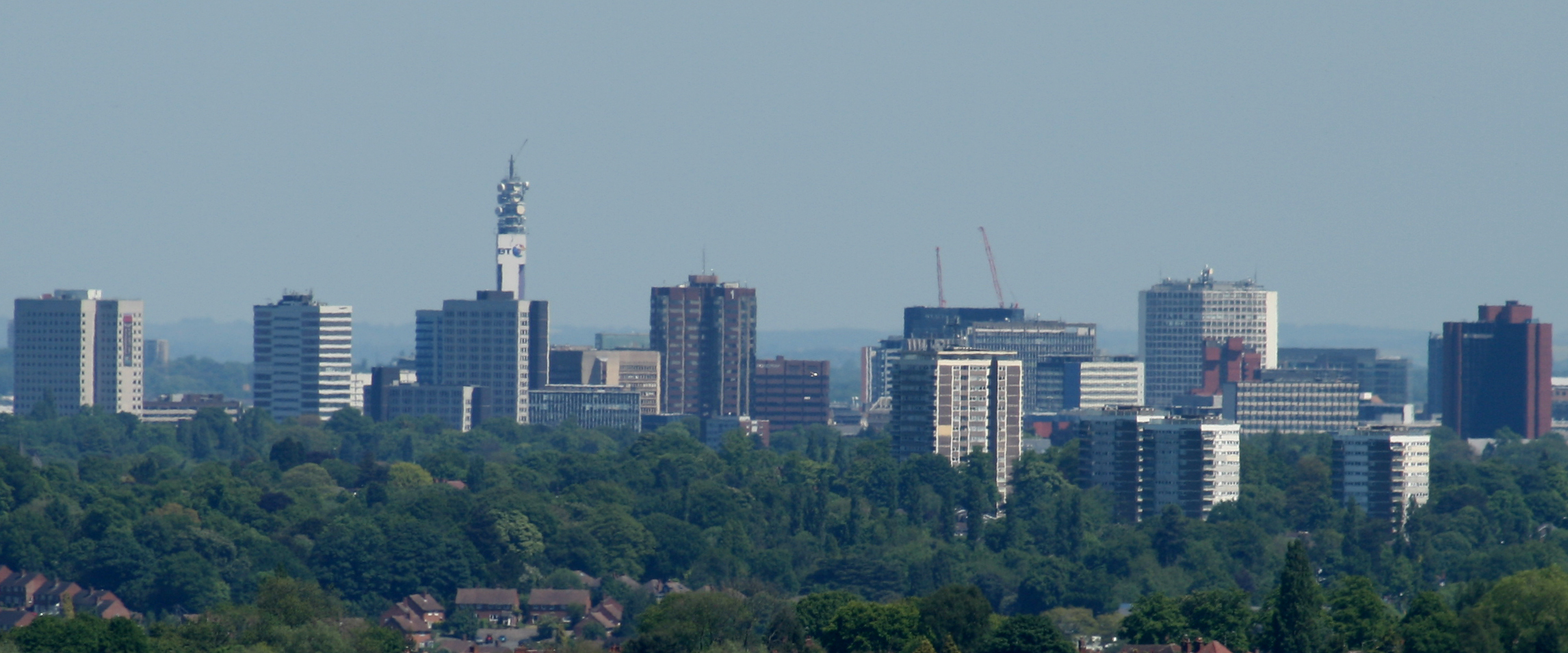
Much of Birmingham, presently the UK's second-largest city, was historically in Warwickshire

Areas historically part of Warwickshire include Coventry, Solihull, Sutton Coldfield, and much of Birmingham including the city centre, Aston, Castle Bromwich, Digbeth, Edgbaston, Erdington, Hodge Hill, Ladywood, Nechells, Saltley, Shard End, Sheldon, Small Heath and Sparkbrook. Other areas historically in Warwickshire, all now in the West Midlands county following local government re-organisation in 1974, include Marston Green, Meriden, Chelmsley Wood, Kingshurst, and Smith's Wood.

In 1986 the West Midlands County Council was abolished and Birmingham, Coventry, and Solihull became effective unitary authorities. However, the West Midlands county name has not been altogether abolished, and still exists for ceremonial purposes. Since 2016, it has been used as part of the West Midlands Combined Authority, with powers over transport, economic development and regeneration. Some organisations, such as Warwickshire County Cricket Club, which is based in Edgbaston, in Birmingham, observe the historic county boundaries.

The flag of the historic county was registered in October 2016. It is a design of a bear and ragged staff on a red field, which is long associated with the county.

The flag of the historic county of Warwickshire

Coventry is effectively in the centre of the Warwickshire area, and still has strong ties with the county. Coventry and Warwickshire are sometimes treated as a single area and share a single Chamber of Commerce, local enterprise partnership and BBC Local Radio Station (BBC CWR).

Coventry was administered separately from the rest of Warwickshire between 1451 and 1842. It formed the County of the City of Coventry, a county corporate from 1451. In 1842 the county corporate of Coventry was abolished and remerged with the rest of Warwickshire.

The town of Tamworth was historically divided between Warwickshire and Staffordshire, but since 1888 has been fully in Staffordshire.

=== Green belt ===
Warwickshire contains a large expanse of green belt area, surrounding the West Midlands and Coventry conurbations, and was first drawn up from the 1950s. All the county's districts contain some portion of the belt.

== Places of interest ==
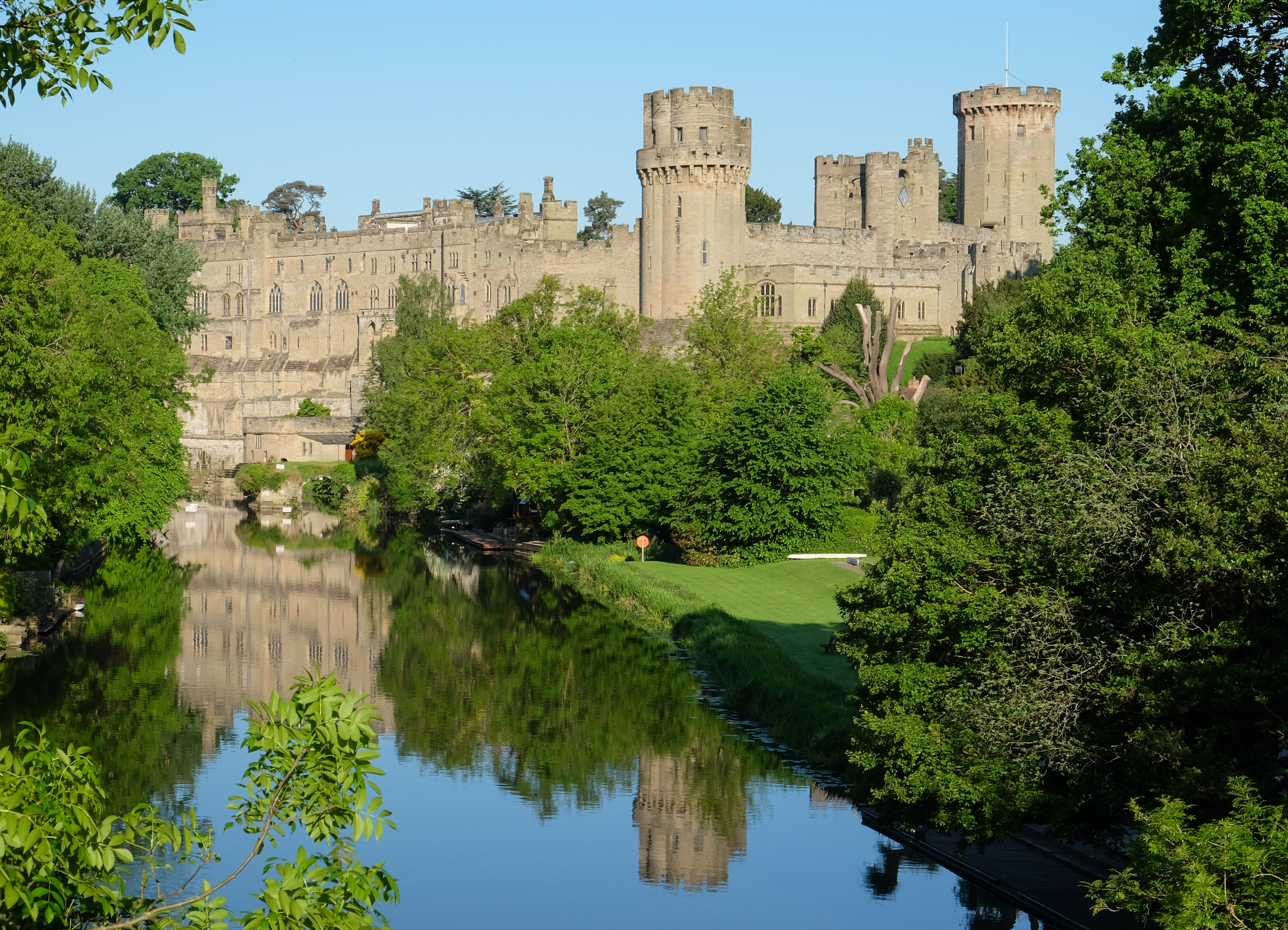
Warwick Castle

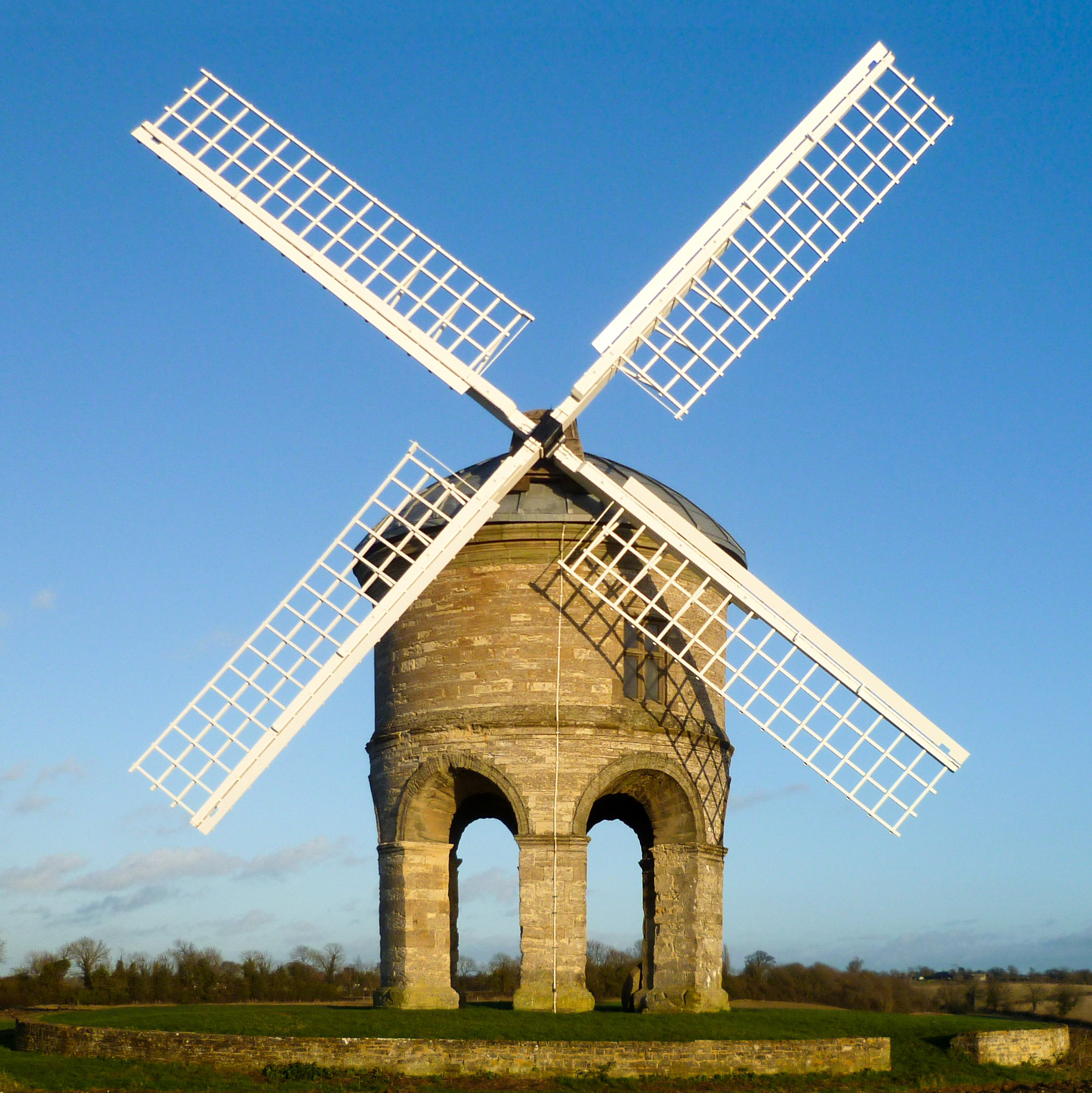
Chesterton Windmill

- Anne Hathaway's Cottage
- Arbury Hall
- Battle of Edgehill
- The Belfry
- Brinklow Castle
- British Motor Museum
- Burton Dassett Hills
- Caldecotte Park
- Charlecote Park
- Charlecote Water Mill
- Chesterton Windmill
- Compton Verney House
- Compton Wynyates
- Coombe Abbey
- Coombe Country Park
- Coughton Court
- Coventry Canal
- Draycote Water
- Grand Union Canal
- Guy Fawkes House
- Hartshill Hayes Country Park
- Hatton Country World
- Jephson Gardens
- Kenilworth Castle
- King Edward VI School
- Kingsbury Water Park
- Ladywalk Reserve
- Lunt Roman Fort
- Lord Leycester Hospital
- Lowsonford
- Mary Arden's House
- Midland Air Museum
- Newbold Quarry Park
- Nuneaton Museum & Art Gallery
- Oxford Canal
- Ragley Hall
- River Avon
- Rollright Stones
- Royal Pump Rooms
- Royal Shakespeare Theatre
- Rugby Art Gallery and Museum
- Rugby School
- Ryton Pools Country Park
- Shakespeare's Birthplace
- Shakespeare's New Place
- St. Nicholas' Park
- Swift Valley Nature Reserve
- The Forest Hermitage
- University of Warwick
- Warwick Castle
- Warwick School
- Webb Ellis Rugby Football Museum
- Wellesbourne Wartime Museum

== Economy ==
Warwickshire has a strong and growing economy with the automotive industry being a major contributor. In the north, BMW's Hams Hall plant employs over 1,000 people, while Jaguar Land Rover and Aston Martin Lagonda have headquarters, including a giant advanced production creation centre, at Gaydon in the south.

Warwickshire has a growing video game industry. One of Britain's oldest still-running game studios, Codemasters, has operated out of Southam since 1986, and the greater "Silicon Spa" area, including Southam, Royal Leamington Spa and Warwick, is now home to dozens of game studios which employ a combined total of over 2,000 employees, equating to more than 10% of the UK's games development workforce.

Increasingly the region is establishing itself as one of the leading areas in battery technology with major developments announced in 2021 that include a £130 million UK Battery Industrialisation Centre (UKBIC) based in Coventry.

Tourism is also a key area of employment with country parks, rural areas and historic towns across the county. It generates a total business turnover of over £1 billion to the local economy and supports almost 20,000 jobs.

== Settlements ==
18 of the 20 largest settlements of Warwickshire, see the green section for Bidford and Wellesbourne. District centres in yellow.
Cities which were historically in (or partially in) the county of Warwickshire. – Orange.
Settlements which have recently been targeted for planned population growth to become larger, suburban villages/towns, across the current and historic county boundaries. – Green.

Main Warwickshire towns and villages, with a population of at least 5,000:

- Nuneaton (88,813)
- Rugby (78,117)
- Leamington Spa (50,923)
- Warwick (36,665)
- Bedworth (31,332)
- Stratford-upon-Avon (30,055)
- Kenilworth (22,538)
- Atherstone (11,259)
- Whitnash (10,489)
- Polesworth (9,913)
- Southam (8,114)
- Kingsbury (7,562)
- Wellesbourne (7,283)
- Coleshill (6,900)
- Bidford-on-Avon (6,818)
- Alcester (6,421)
- Bulkington (6,080)
- Studley (6,040)
- Shipston-on-Stour (5,849)

== History ==
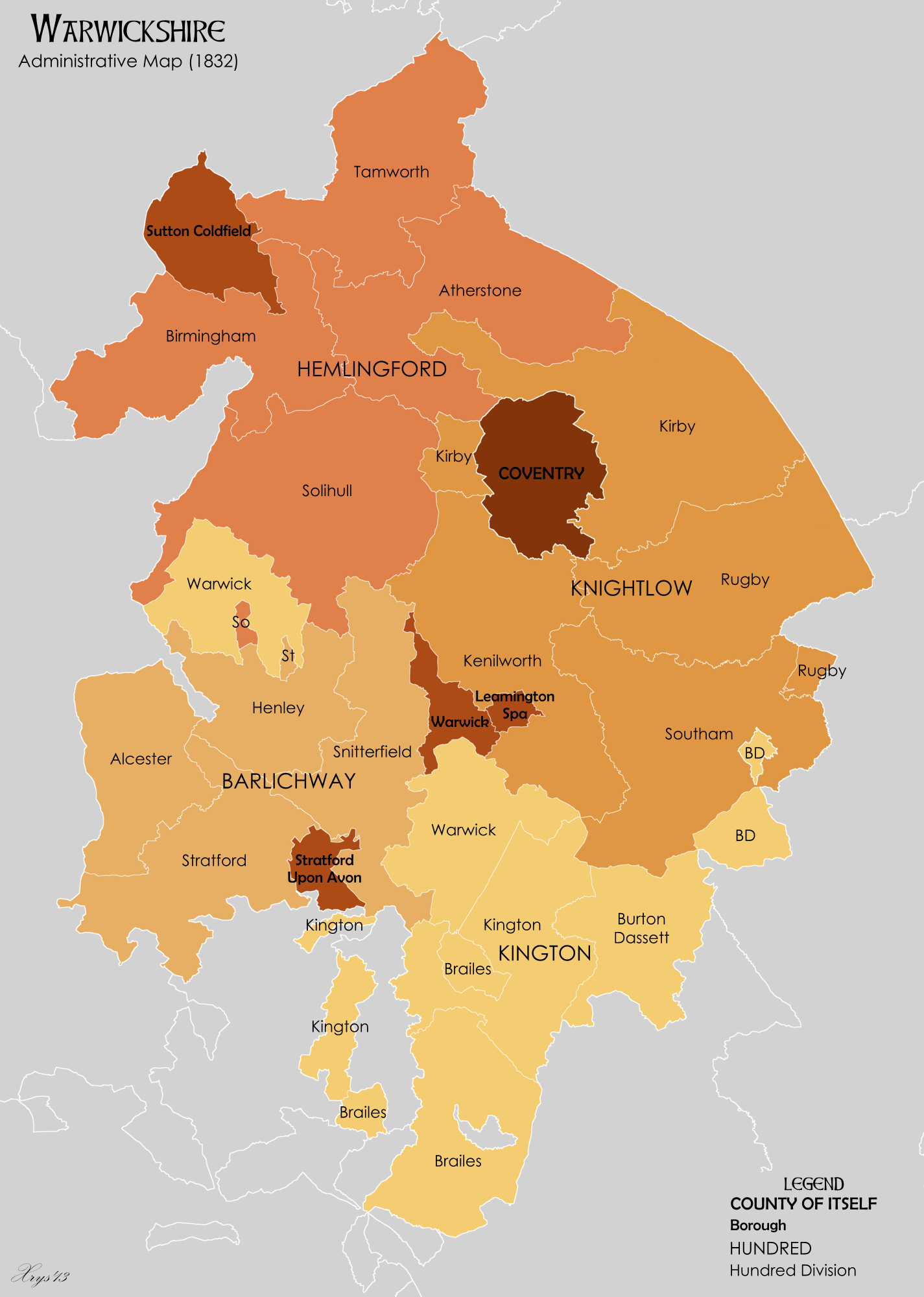
Warwickshire in 1832

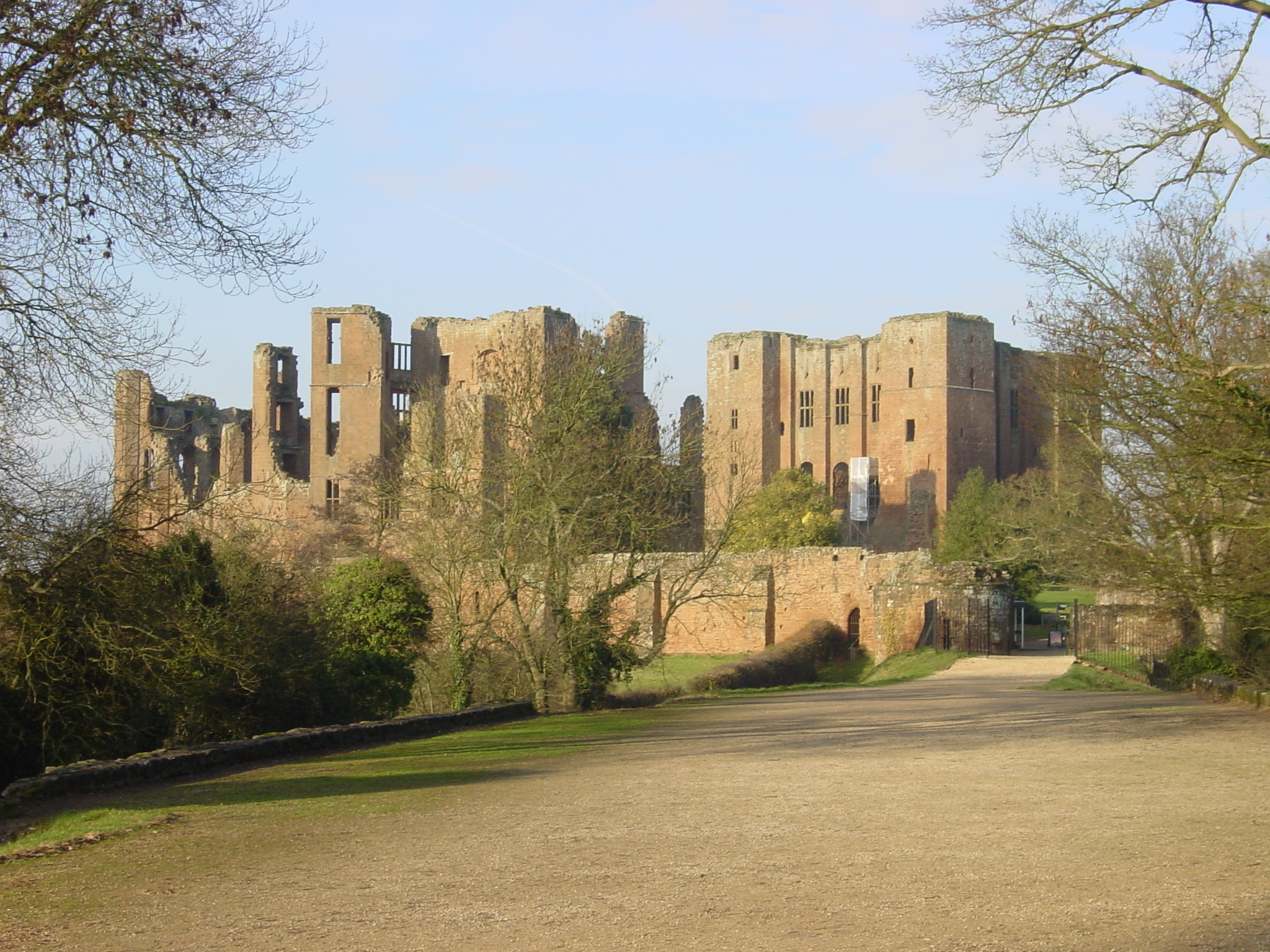
Kenilworth Castle

Warwickshire came into being as a division of the kingdom of Mercia in the early 11th century. The first reference to Warwickshire was in 1001, as Wæringscīr, named after Warwick. The prefix wara- is the genitive plural of the Old English noun waru, which means "those that care for, watch, guard, protect, or defend". It was used as an endonym by both Goths (Note: Warmia and Warsaw.) and Jutes. (Note: Meonwara.) The suffix -wick is an Old English cognate (-wic) for the Latin word for village, vicus. Near Warwick are the villages of Long Itchington and Bishop's Itchington along the River Itchen. (Note: Itchen derives from Ytene, the genitive plural of Yte the exonym of "Jute", i.e. "of the Jutes". Various place-names identify locations as Jutish. These include Bishopstoke (Ytingstoc), the River Itchen (Ytene) and the Meon Valley (Ytedene).)

During the Middle Ages Warwickshire was dominated by Coventry, at the time one of the most important cities in England because of its prominence in the textiles trade. Warwickshire played a key part in the English Civil War, with the Battle of Edgehill and other skirmishes taking place in the county. During the Industrial Revolution Warwickshire became one of Britain's foremost industrial counties, with the large industrial cities of Birmingham and Coventry within its boundaries.

=== Boundary changes ===
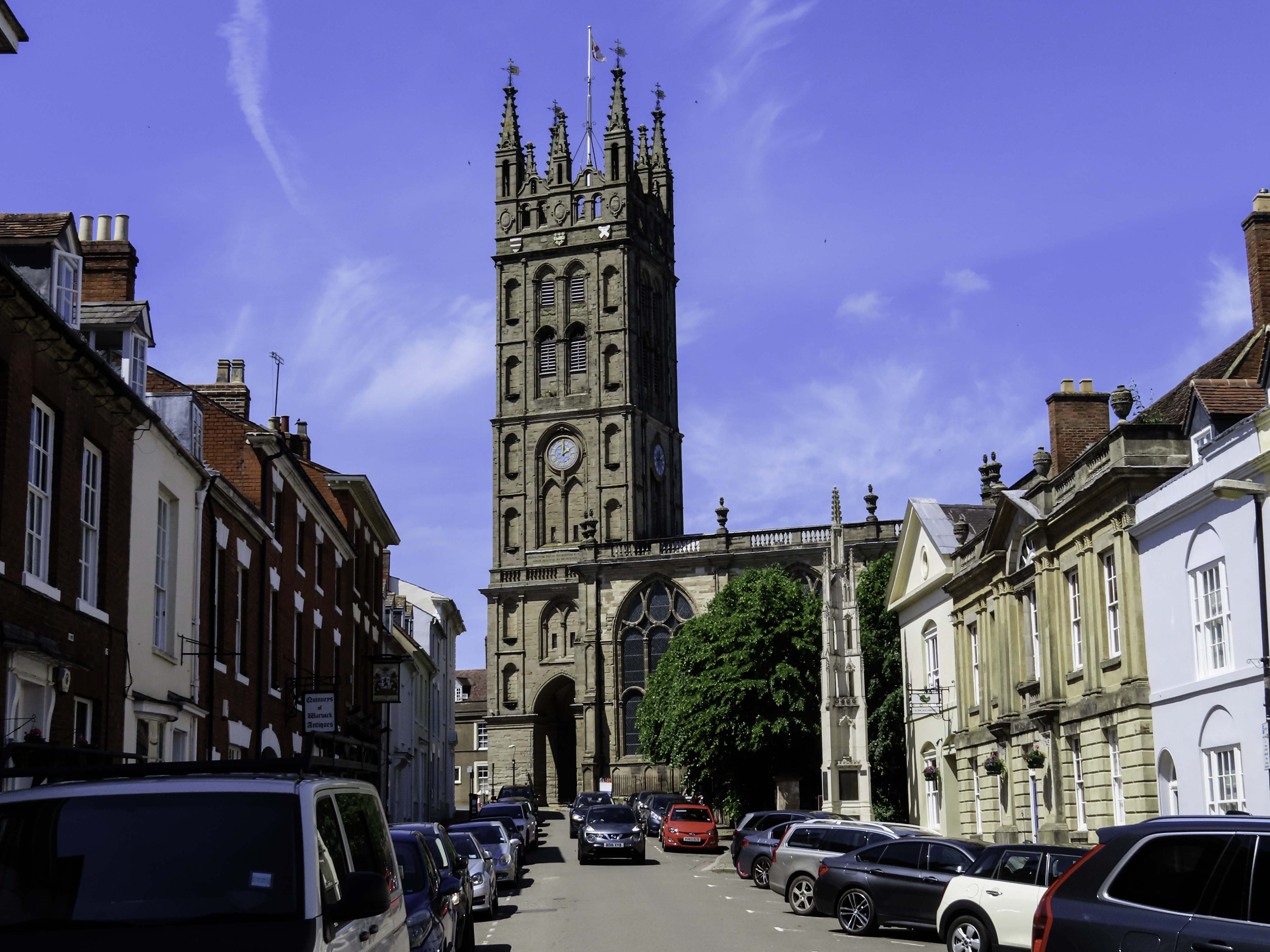
Collegiate Church of St Mary, Warwick from Church Street

- 1844: The Counties (Detached Parts) Act transferred a township to, and two parishes from, the county.
- 1888: Those parts of the town of Tamworth lying in Warwickshire were ceded to Staffordshire.
- 1891: Harborne became part of the County Borough of Birmingham and thus was transferred from Staffordshire to Warwickshire by the Local Government Board's Provisional Order Confirmation (No. 13) Act 1891 (54 & 55 Vict. c. clxi) (local act).
- 1891: The district of Balsall Heath, which had originally constituted the most northerly part of the Parish of King's Norton in Worcestershire, was added to the County Borough of Birmingham, and therefore Warwickshire, on 1 October 1891.
- 1909: Quinton was formally removed from Worcestershire and incorporated into the County Borough of Birmingham, then in Warwickshire, on 9 November 1909.
- 1911: The Urban District of Handsworth, in Staffordshire, and the Rural District of Yardley along with the greater part of the Urban District of King's Norton and Northfield, both in Worcestershire, were absorbed into Birmingham, and thus Warwickshire, as part of the Greater Birmingham Scheme on 9 November 1911.
- 1928: Perry Barr Urban District was ceded to Birmingham from Staffordshire.
- 1931: The boundaries between Gloucestershire, Warwickshire, and Worcestershire were adjusted by the Provisional Order Confirmation (Gloucestershire, Warwickshire and Worcestershire) Act which transferred 26 parishes between the three counties, largely to eliminate exclaves. The town of Shipston-on-Stour was gained from Worcestershire and several villages, including Long Marston and Welford-on-Avon, from Gloucestershire, while the parish of Ipsley was ceded from Alcester Rural District to Redditch Urban District in Worcestershire.
- 1969: Matchborough was ceded to Worcestershire as part of the new town development of Redditch.
- 1974: Under The Local Government Act 1972, Birmingham, Coventry, Solihull and Sutton Coldfield were ceded to the new West Midlands county, with Sutton Coldfield becoming part of Birmingham.

== Local government ==
The coat of arms of Warwickshire County Council

Like most English shire counties, Warwickshire has a two-tier local government of a county council, and five districts each having a district or borough council. These districts are: North Warwickshire, Nuneaton and Bedworth, Rugby, Stratford-on-Avon, and Warwick (see map). The county and district councils are responsible for providing different services.

Atherstone is the headquarters of the North Warwickshire district, Nuneaton is headquarters of the Nuneaton and Bedworth District and Leamington Spa is the headquarters of the Warwick district.

Warwickshire County Council, based in Warwick is elected every four years. The election on 6 May 2021 resulted in a Conservative majority. The county council operates a cabinet-style council. The county council is made up of 57 councillors, who decide upon the budget and appoint the council leader. The council leader selects 8 councillors and together they form the cabinet. The Leader assigns portfolios on which cabinet members make decisions. Key decisions are made by the whole cabinet while others are made only by the portfolio holders for relevant areas.

In addition many small towns and villages have their own town council or parish council as the most local tier of local government.

Warwickshire is policed by the Warwickshire Police. The force is governed by the elected Warwickshire Police and Crime Commissioner.

=== Future ===
In July 2026, the UK Government announced that it intends to reorganise Warwickshire into two unitary authority areas by April 2028. The county will be divided north–south, with the northern area combining the current districts of North Warwickshire, Nuneaton, and Rugby, to form a new North Warwickshire unitary authority, and the southern area combining Warwick and Stratford-on-Avon to form a new South Warwickshire unitary authority. Elections to the new unitary councils will take place in May 2027.

== Education ==
In the state sector, children start school in the school year in which they turn five. They stay at primary school for seven years (although this varies even within the county, as some people have previously gone for four years and then spent another four years at a 'middle school') until they are eleven. Warwickshire is one of 36 local authorities in England to still maintain the grammar school system in two districts: Stratford-on-Avon and Rugby. In the final year of primary school, children are given the opportunity of sitting the 11-plus exam to compete for a place at one of the 5 grammar schools: Stratford-upon-Avon Grammar School for Girls; King Edward VI School, a boys' school from year 7–11 with a mixed Sixth-Form; Lawrence Sheriff Grammar School for Boys; Rugby High School for Girls and Alcester Grammar School (mixed). The Warwickshire 11+ selection test consists of two papers, each containing a mixture of verbal reasoning, numerical reasoning and non-verbal reasoning multiple-choice questions.

Warwickshire contains four colleges of further education: North Warwickshire & Hinckley College, King Edward VI Sixth Form College (K.E.G.S) in Nuneaton, Stratford-upon-Avon College and the Warwickshire College Group an institution made up of six main separate colleges that have merged (Leamington Centre, Rugby Centre, Moreton Morrell Centre, Pershore College, Henley-in-Arden Centre and the Trident Centre in Warwick).

There are also six independent senior schools within the county, namely: Rugby School, Warwick School, Princethorpe College, Kingsley School, Arnold Lodge School (both in Leamington Spa), and the King's High School For Girls (in Warwick).

A number of the Warwickshire grammar and independent schools have historical significance. King Edward VI School, Stratford-upon-Avon still uses 13th century school buildings and is the likely school of William Shakespeare, Rugby School was founded in 1567 and Warwick School was founded c. 914 AD, which makes it the oldest surviving boys' school in the country. Rugby School is one of nine schools that were defined as the "great" English public schools by the Public Schools Act 1868, and is a member of the Rugby Group. Rugby School, Princethorpe College and Warwick School are HMC schools, with the Headmaster from each school attending the Headmasters' and Headmistresses' Conference.

There are no universities per se in Warwickshire, though the University of Warwick forms part of the border with Warwickshire on the southern edge of the city of Coventry. Some areas of the University of Warwick are within the boundaries of Warwickshire including Lakeside Village and Warwick Business School The university has a small campus near Wellesbourne which housed the Warwick Horticultural Research Centre and an Innovation Centre.

== Transport ==
=== Roads ===
Several major motorways run through Warwickshire; these are:

- The M40 motorway, which connects London to Birmingham, runs through the centre of the county; it serves Leamington Spa, Warwick and Stratford.
- The M6 motorway, which connects North West England and the West Midlands to the M1 motorway (and then on to London), runs through the north of Warwickshire; it serves Rugby, Nuneaton and Bedworth on its way to Birmingham.
- The M69 Coventry to Leicester motorway serves Nuneaton.
- Other motorways pass briefly through Warwickshire including the M45 (a short spur south of Rugby connecting to the M1), the southern end of the M6 Toll and the M42; it passes through the county at several points.

Other major trunk routes in Warwickshire include:

- A45 takes a route through Birmingham, Coventry and Rugby, then east into Northamptonshire
- A46 connects the M40 to the M6 via Warwick, Kenilworth and Coventry
- A452 Leamington to Birmingham route
- A5 passes through Atherstone and then east of Nuneaton, and then east of Rugby, it marks the county boundary with Leicestershire.
- A444 goes through Nuneaton and Bedworth.

=== Railway ===
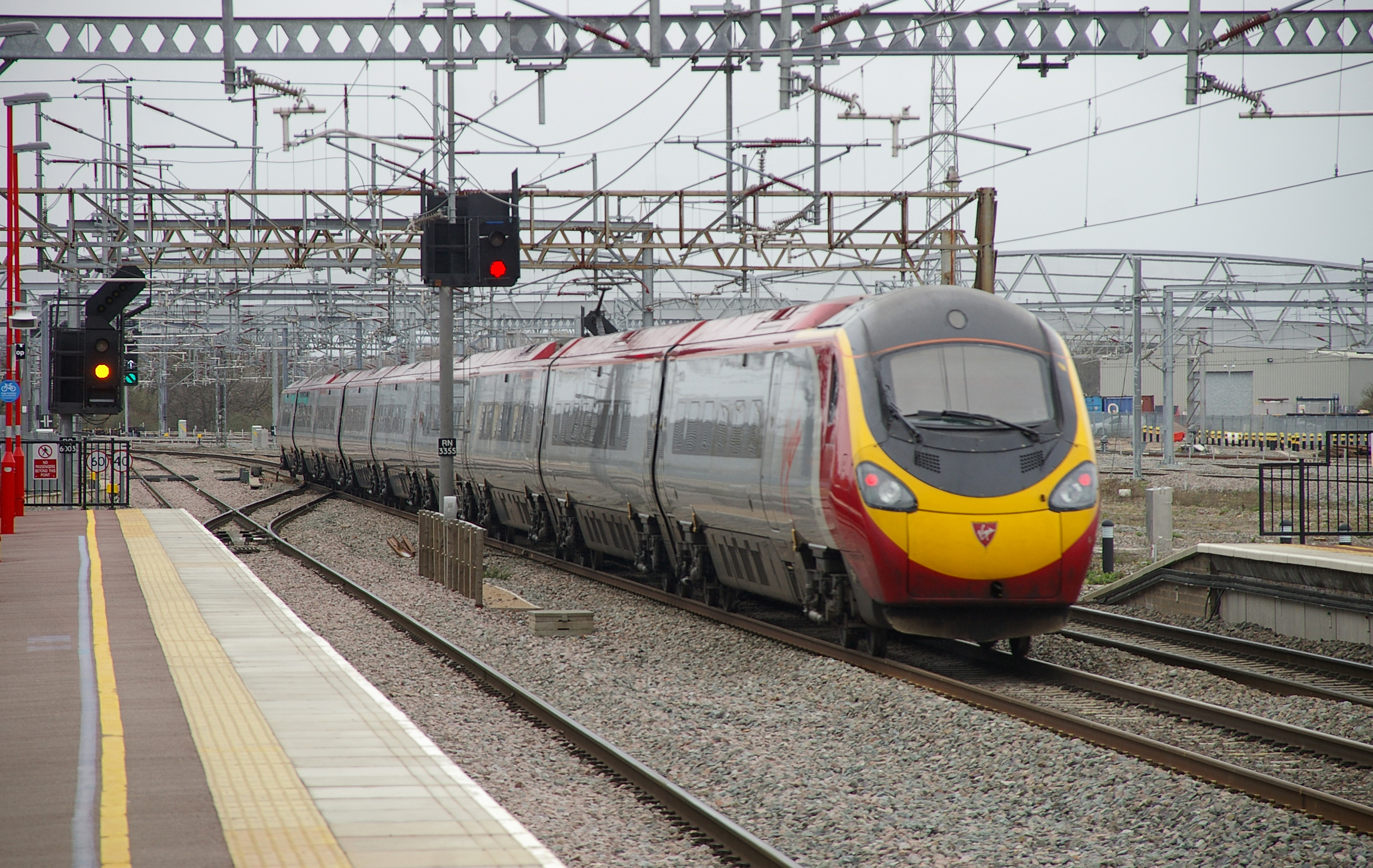
The West Coast Main Line at Rugby

==== Main line routes ====
Two main railway lines pass through Warwickshire:

- The Chiltern Main Line takes the former Great Western Railway route from London Marylebone to Birmingham Snow Hill. It passes through the centre of Warwickshire on a route similar to the M40 motorway and has stations at Leamington Spa, Warwick, Warwick Parkway, Hatton and Lapworth. Services are provided by Chiltern Railways and West Midlands Trains (Birmingham to Leamington only). There are also two branches off the Chiltern line: the Leamington to Coventry and Leamington-Stratford lines.
- The West Coast Main Line (WCML) runs through Warwickshire. At Rugby, the WCML splits into two parts: one runs west through to Coventry and Birmingham, and the other the Trent Valley Line runs north-west towards Stafford, North West England and Scotland. This section has stations at Nuneaton, Atherstone and Polesworth (northbound services only). There is one branch off the WCML from Nuneaton to Coventry, with there are stations at Bermuda Park, Bedworth and Coventry Arena.

==== Other lines ====
Other railway lines in Warwickshire include:

- Birmingham-Nuneaton section of the Birmingham to Peterborough Line, which continues east of Nuneaton towards Leicester and Peterborough. Nuneaton has direct services to Birmingham and Leicester on this line; there are two intermediate stations at Water Orton and Coleshill in the extreme north-west of the county.
- North Warwickshire Line from Birmingham to Stratford-upon-Avon. This line used to continue southwards to Cheltenham, but is now a dead-end branch. There is an intermediate station on this line at Henley-in-Arden and at several small villages. Stratford also has direct rail services to London via the branch line to Warwick.

Between 1965 and 2018, the only major town in Warwickshire without a station was Kenilworth. The Leamington to Coventry line passes through the town, but the station was closed as part of the Beeching cuts. Kenilworth railway station was rebuilt and opened in April 2018, with an hourly service to Coventry and to Leamington provided by West Midlands Trains.

==== High Speed 2 ====
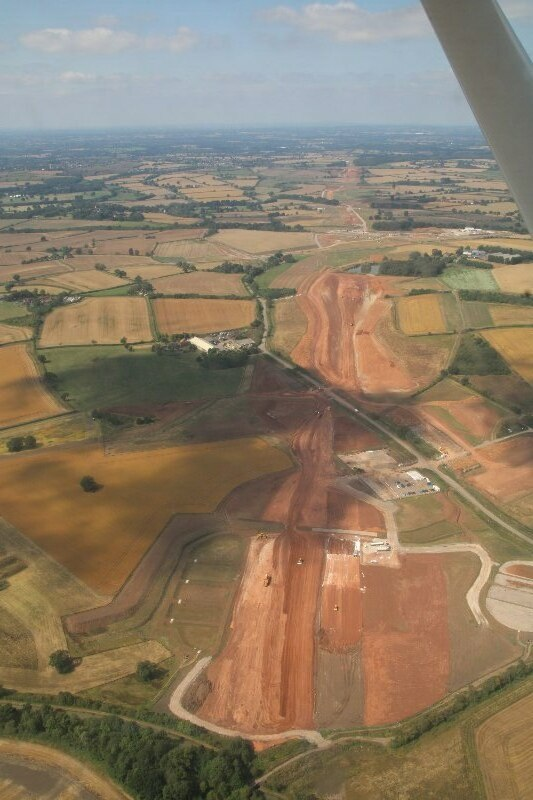
HS2 construction near Leamington Spa in August 2021

The new High Speed 2 (HS2) line is a long-distance route that is being constructed through Warwickshire; however, there will be no stations in the county. It will pass south of Southam, then between Kenilworth and Coventry, before running into the West Midlands towards Birmingham.

=== Air ===
Coventry Airport was near the Warwickshire village of Baginton. The airport closed in June 2026.

=== Canals and waterways ===
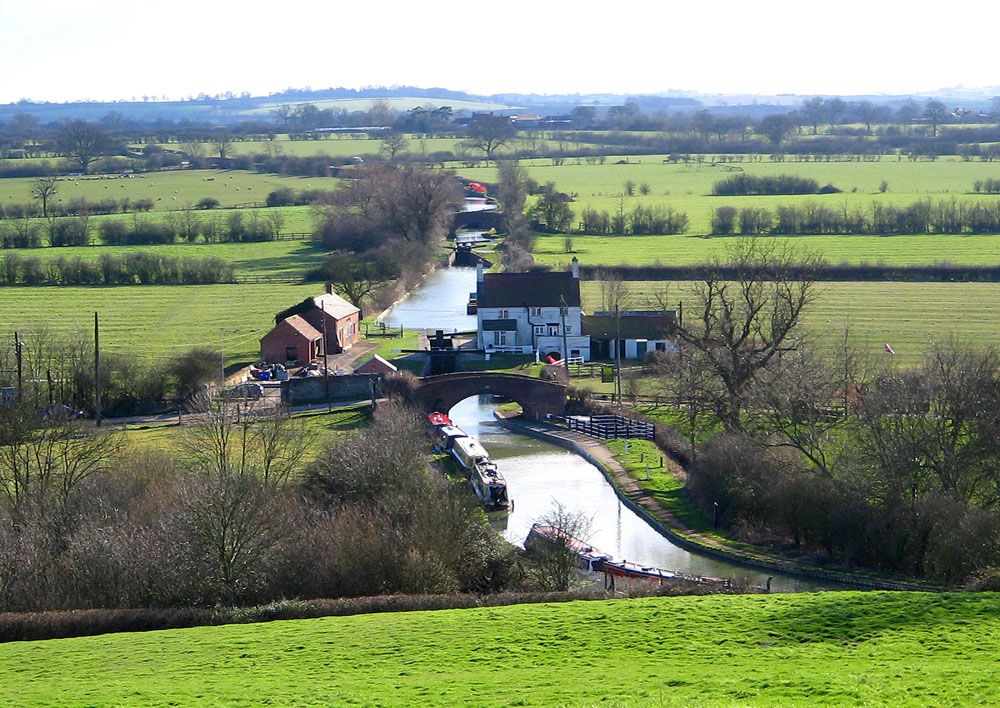
The Oxford Canal at Napton-on-the-Hill

Canals and navigable waterways in Warwickshire include:

- The Coventry Canal, which runs through the north of the county from Coventry through Bedworth, Nuneaton, Atherstone and Polesworth, and then onwards to Tamworth.
- The Ashby-de-la-Zouch Canal passes briefly through Warwickshire from a junction with the Coventry Canal at Bedworth.
- The Oxford Canal runs from near Coventry, then eastwards around Rugby and through the rural south of the county towards Oxford.
- The Grand Union Canal runs through Leamington and Warwick, then onwards to Birmingham.
  - The restored Saltisford Canal Arm is close to the centre of Warwick and is now a short branch of the Grand Union Canal. The arm is the remains of the original terminus of the Warwick and Birmingham Canal; it dates back to 1799.
- The Stratford-upon-Avon Canal runs from the Grand Union west of Warwick to Stratford, where it joins the Avon.
- The River Avon runs through Warwickshire on a south-west to north-east axis, running through Stratford, Warwick and Rugby. It is navigable for 47 miles (76 km) from the River Severn at Tewkesbury to Alveston weir just east of Stratford-upon-Avon, making it the only navigable river in Warwickshire. There have been proposals to extend the Avon navigation 13 miles (21 km) to Warwick. However, as of 2019, these plans look unlikely to proceed.

== Media ==
=== Television ===
The county is covered by BBC West Midlands and ITV Central from its studios in Birmingham. Television signals are received from either the Lark Stoke or Sutton Coldfield TV transmitters.

=== Radio ===
BBC Local Radio for the county is served by BBC CWR which broadcast from its studios in Coventry. However, the North Warwickshire area is served by BBC Radio WM. County-wide commercial radio stations are Capital Mid-Counties, Hits Radio Coventry & Warwickshire, Fresh (Coventry & Warwickshire), Heart West Midlands and Greatest Hits Radio Midlands.

== Sport ==
=== Cycling ===
Warwickshire's rural roads, canal towpaths and historic towns are increasingly popular with cycling enthusiasts. Its reputation as a major cycling destination has been bolstered in recent years having hosted a stage of the Women's Tour since 2016 and the Men's Tour of Britain in 2018 and 2019.

In 2022, St Nicholas Park in Warwick hosted the Elite Men's and Women's Road Race as part of the Commonwealth Games that took place in Birmingham.

=== Association football ===
Warwickshire has no Football League clubs. As of the 2026–27 season the highest-placed teams are Leamington, Racing Club Warwick and Stratford Town, who play in the Southern Football League Premier Division Central, the seventh tier of English football. Other clubs include Nuneaton Borough, Rugby Town, Bedworth United, Southam United, Coleshill Town, Atherstone Town and Nuneaton Griff; all of these are affiliated to the Birmingham FA.

Premier League teams Aston Villa and Coventry City, and EFL Championship club Birmingham City are located within the historic boundaries of Warwickshire; National League club Solihull Moors and Northern Premier League Division One Midlands club Sutton Coldfield Town are also sited in this area.

=== Parkrun ===
There are six Saturday morning 5 km parkruns in Warwickshire for all ages and abilities: Leamington, Stratford upon Avon, Rugby, Bedworth, Southam and Kingsbury. There are also three Sunday 2 km junior events at Stratford upon Avon, Rugby and Warwick.

=== Cricket ===
Warwickshire County Cricket Club play at Edgbaston Cricket Ground, Birmingham, which was historically part of Warwickshire. Notable English players for the side have been Eric Hollies, M.J.K. Smith, Bob Willis, Dennis Amiss, Jonathan Trott, Ian Bell, Moeen Ali and Chris Woakes. Overseas players have included Alvin Kallicharran, Rohan Kanhai, Brian Lara, Allan Donald and Shaun Pollock. In 2014, the club partly severed its links to the county by renaming its Twenty20 side the Birmingham Bears, much to the chagrin of many supporters. The club took the decision to rename its T20 team back to the Warwickshire Bears at the beginning of the 2026 Vitality Blast season.

Other grounds in modern-day Warwickshire which have hosted first-class cricket matches are:

- Griff and Coton Ground, Nuneaton – 26 matches (most recently 1980)
- Arlington Avenue, Leamington Spa – 4 matches (most recently 1910)
- Swan's Nest Lane, Stratford-upon-Avon – 3 matches (most recently 2005)
- Weddington Road, Nuneaton – 3 matches (most recently 1914)

=== Gaelic sports ===
The Warwickshire County Board of the Gaelic Athletic Association (GAA) (or Warwickshire GAA) is one of the county boards outside Ireland and is responsible for Gaelic games in Warwickshire. The county board is also responsible for the Warwickshire inter-county teams. They play their home games at Páirc na hÉireann.

=== Polo ===
The Dallas Burston Polo Club is a six-pitch polo club located near Southam.

=== Water polo ===
Warwick Water Polo club play in the Midland League, and train in Warwick, Banbury and Coventry.

== Freedom of the county ==
In March 2014 the freedom of the county was bestowed on the Royal Regiment of Fusiliers. The honour was officially bestowed following a parade through Warwick on 6 June 2014.

== People ==
Warwickshire was the birthplace of William Shakespeare from Stratford-upon-Avon. Road signs at the county boundary describe Warwickshire as "Shakespeare's County". The county has produced figures such as Aleister Crowley (from Leamington Spa), George Eliot and Ken Loach (from Nuneaton), Rupert Brooke (from Rugby), and Michael Drayton (from Hartshill). The poet Philip Larkin lived in Warwick (born in nearby Coventry). Folk musician Nick Drake lived and died in Tanworth-in-Arden. Frank Whittle the inventor of the jet engine was born in Coventry and was closely associated with Warwickshire, growing up in Leamington Spa, and carrying out much of his work at Rugby.

== See also ==
- List of Lord Lieutenants of Warwickshire
- List of High Sheriffs for Warwickshire
- List of English and Welsh endowed schools (19th century)#Warwickshire
- Custos Rotulorum of Warwickshire – List of Keepers of the Rolls
- Warwickshire (UK Parliament constituency) – List of MPs for Warwickshire constituency
- 2007 Atherstone fire
- Warwickshire College
- W. W. Quatremain
