= Saeed Anwar =

Pakistani cricketer

PP Saeed Anwar
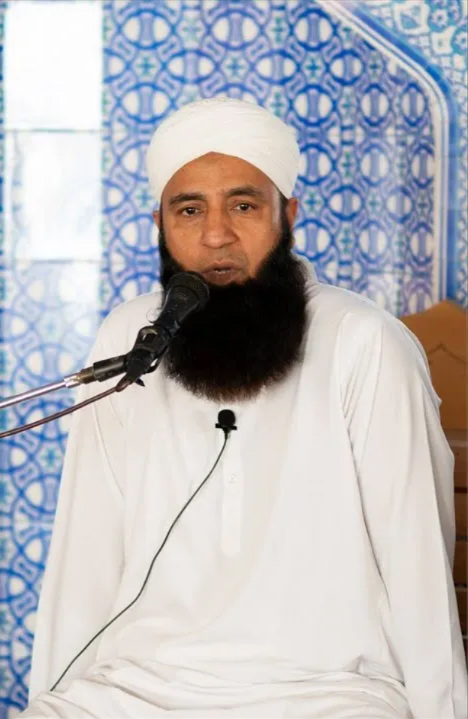
- Saeed Anwar in January 2023

Personal information
- Full name: Saeed Anwar
- Born: 6 September 1968 (age 58); Karachi,Pakistan
- Height: 5 ft 8 in (173 cm)
- Batting: Left-handed
- Bowling: Slow left arm orthodox

International information
- National side: Pakistan (1989–2003)
- Test debut (cap 120): 23 November 1990 v West Indies
- Last Test: 31 August 2001 v Bangladesh
- ODI debut (cap 68): 1 January 1989 v West Indies
- Last ODI: 4 March 2003 v Zimbabwe
- ODI shirt no.: 1

Career statistics
Competition	Test	ODI	FC	LA
Matches	55	247	146	242
Runs scored	4,052	8824	10,169	8842
Batting average	45.52	39.21	45.19	39.21
100s/50s	11/25	20/43	30/51	26/54
Top score	188*	194	221	194
Balls bowled	48	242	653	858
Wickets	0	6	9	31
Bowling average	–	31.83	45.77	20.80
5 wickets in innings	–	0	0	0
10 wickets in match	–	0	0	0
Best bowling	–	2/9	3/83	4/39
Catches/stumpings	18/–	42/–	65/–	64/–
Medal record
Men's Cricket
Representing Pakistan
ICC Cricket World Cup
Runner-up	1999 England-Wales -Ireland-Scotland-Netherlands
- Source: ESPNcricinfo, 29 May 2012

Saeed Anwar (Note: Urdu: سعید انور) PP (born 6 September 1968) is a Pakistani former cricketer and captain of the national Test and ODI teams. An opening batsman and occasional slow left arm orthodox bowler, Anwar played international cricket between 1989 and 2003. He is considered one of greatest opening batsmen Pakistan has ever produced and also regarded as one of the finest batsmen of his era. Anwar has scored twenty centuries in ODIs, more than any other Pakistani batsmen in this format. He played 55 Test matches, scoring 4052 runs with eleven centuries, average 45.52. In 247 One Day Internationals (ODIs) he made 8824 runs at an average of 39.21. Anwar is credited for being one of the most stylish batsmen of the 1990s alongside Mark Waugh, Damien Martyn and Sourav Ganguly. Cricket fans widely admire his timing, elegance, and placement of cricket shots. He was a part of the squad which finished as runners-up at the 1999 Cricket World Cup.

Anwar got a pair on Test debut against the West Indies in 1990, but showed his class early, when he scored 169 runs in his third Test against New Zealand in February 1994. In 1998–99, he became the third Pakistani to carry the bat through a Test innings, and scored his highest Test score of 188 not out. He made seven ODI centuries at Sharjah Cricket Association Stadium, including three consecutive ones during 1993–94. Anwar scored two successive hundreds on three occasions in his career. He is most notable for scoring 194 runs against India in Chennai in 1997, where he smashed three consecutive sixes to Anil Kumble. The highest ODI score at the time. Anwar participated in three Cricket World Cups, and captained Pakistan in seven Tests and 11 ODIs. In August 2003, he announced his retirement from International cricket. He was the highest runs-scoring batsman for Pakistan in the 1996, 1999, and 2003 World Cups.

== Early and personal life ==
Saeed Anwar was born on 6 September 1968 in Karachi. In 1973, he shifted with his family to Iran, where his father worked as an engineer, but in 1977, because of the pre-revolutionary turmoil, his father then shifted to Saudi Arabia whereas Anwar returned to Karachi to live with his grandparents. Anwar went to high school at Government Degree Science College, Malir Cantt and went to university at NED University of Engineering and Technology, Karachi. He graduated from NED in 1989 majoring in Computer system engineering. He was planning to go to the United States for his Master's studies before becoming a professional Test cricketer.

His father, a businessman by profession, played cricket at club level while his brother Javed Anwar had played for Lahore Under-19. Anwar has argued that his later wrist-power was due to this family environment where sports were encouraged, having played squash on a daily basis as well table tennis.

Anwar married Lubna, a doctor by profession, in March 1996. He faced a personal tragedy in 2001 when his daughter, Bismah, died after a prolonged illness. After this, he became more religious and starting preaching Islam across Pakistan with the Tablighi Jamaat movement of Deobandism. He was particularly attracted to religion by the preaching of cleric Tariq Jamil.

Anwar made his return to cricket after a long hiatus and was one of the most consistent Pakistani batsmen in the 2003 World Cup. However upon his return, he lost his previous touch and could not perform as he did before. He was criticized for the loss of form which led to his retirement from cricket soon. "I retired because I felt unwanted", he said. At the time he left cricket he was a computer engineer by profession. During his career, he was an elegant batsman and played particularly well on the off side, his trademark flick being a sure shot feature in almost all of his innings. He led the funeral prayers for his former teammate Wasim Akram's spouse, Huma Akram, in Lahore.

== International career ==
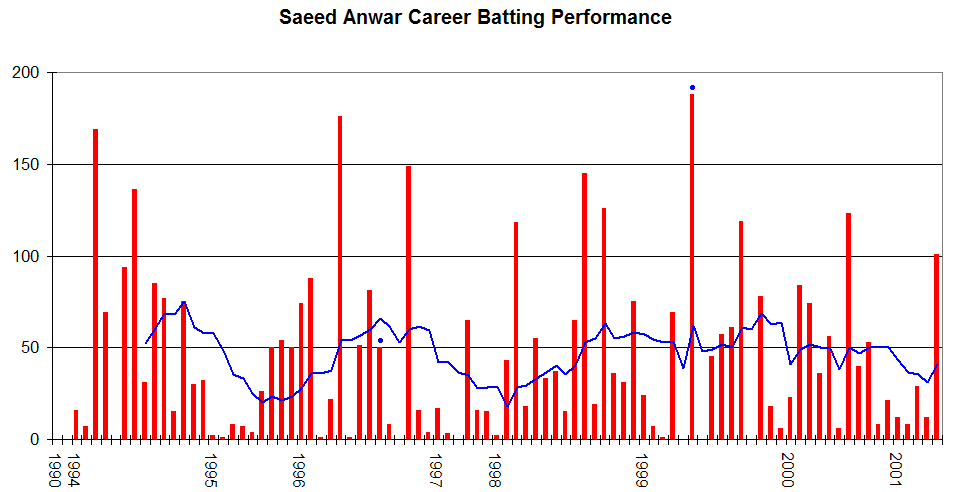
A breakdown of Saeed's Test batting career, showing runs scored. The Blue line indicates batting average in the 10 most recent innings at that point, and the blue dots indicate innings in which he finished not-out.

=== Test career ===
Anwar was an outstanding opener in Test cricket. He played 55 Test matches for Pakistan and scored 4052 at the average of 45.52. He is the seventh-highest run scorer for Pakistan in Test cricket, and scored 11 centuries and 25 half-centuries during his international career. As an aggressive opening batsman, most of his centuries turned into relatively big scores. He scored many of his centuries away against almost every team he toured, and averaged more than 40 against three of the four nations – South Africa, Australia, New Zealand and England – which have been most difficult for Asian batsmen. He has the highest Test batting average (59.06) of any Pakistani against Australia, and once scored two consecutive centuries against them.

He made his Test debut against the West Indies in a match which Pakistan lost at Iqbal Stadium, Faisalabad, in 1990. He got a pair in the match. Curtly Ambrose and Ian Bishop dismissed him in the first and second innings respectively. In the third Test of his career, Anwar scored 169 runs in Pakistan's solitary innings against New Zealand in February 1994; Pakistan won the match by an innings and 12 runs. Later in the same year during Pakistan's tour to Sri Lanka, his 94 and 136 runs in the first match at Colombo earned him a man of the match award, and ensured Pakistan's victory by 301 runs. Scroring fifties—85 and 77 runs—in both the innings of the first Test against Australia at Karachi in September 1994, Anwar helped Pakistan led the three match series 1–0. In the same season against Zimbabwe, he was unsuccessful with bat in the away series; he only managed 45 runs playing in four innings of two Tests. Anwar scored three consecutive fifties against Sri Lanka in the 1995 home series. In the series, he played three innings scoring 154 runs with an average of 51.50.

In the 1996 Pakistan's tour of England, a three-Test match series was played between the teams. Pakistan won the series by 2–0, their fifth consecutive series win against England. Anwar remained the second highest run scorer with 362 runs – only behind Alec Stewart's 396 – with an average of 60.33. He scored 88 and 74 runs in the first Test at Lord's, and 176 and one runs in the third match at The Oval. In the 1996–97 season, he played two Tests against the touring Zimbabwe and aggregated 182 runs in three innings, the second highest after Wasim Akram's 292. In the same season, Anwar replaced injured Akram as captain for the home series against New Zealand. He was the second highest run-scorer once again, accumulating 157 runs in three innings, including 149 in the second Test at Rawalpindi Cricket Stadium. In the next home series, against South Africa in 1997–98, he only scored 40 runs in four innings at the average of 8.00. He aggregated 236 runs in the away series against the same team—only behind Azhar Mahmood's 327. He scored 118 runs in the second Test at Kingsmead Cricket Ground, which allowed Pakistan to win a Test match for the first time in South Africa. Anwar scored 150 runs at the average of 37.50, during Pakistan's tour to Zimbabwe.

In the 1998–99 season, Anwar played two Tests against the touring Australia, and scored 290 at the average of 96.66, including two centuries. His partnership of 120 runs with Mushtaq Ahmed, for the ninth, prevented Pakistan's collapse in the first innings of the first Test at the Rawalpindi Cricket Stadium. He scored 145 runs in the match, but Pakistan lost the match by an innings and 99 runs. In the next home series, Anwar played two matches against Zimbabwe, scoring 142 runs at the average of 47.33. He was ineffective against India, scoring 101 runs in two matches, during Pakistan's tour to India.

In the first Test of the 1998–99 Asian Test Championship, Anwar became the third Pakistani to carry his bat through a Test innings, following father and son Nazar Mohammed and Mudassar Nazar. Anwar's career best 188 not out in the second innings at the Eden Gardens—beating the team's total at the previous innings (185) where he made a duck—was 60 per cent of the total, 316. (Note: Anwar's 188 not out was the fourth highest score in an innings after Mahela Jayawardene's 242, Ijaz Ahmed's 211 and Inzamam-ul-Haq's 200 not out .) It was also the highest Test score by a Pakistani on Indian soil which was surpassed by Younus Khan; Younus scored 267 runs at the M Chinnaswamy Stadium in the third Test of the 2004–05 series between the teams. He was the fourth highest run-scorer of the tournament, with 290 runs from five innings, averaged 72.50. (Note: Mahela Jayawardene, Sadagoppan Ramesh and Wajahatullah Wasti scored more than Anwar, with 297, 292, 291 respectively.)

Anwar played three Test during Pakistan's tour of Australia in 1999–2000 season, scoring 282 runs at the average of 47.00. His performance in the series, a century and two fifties, could not prevent Pakistan's defeat of 3–0. Anwar captained Pakistan in the first two Tests during the Sri Lanka tour to Pakistan, and scored 217 runs at the average of 54.25. In the reply series in 2000, Pakistan and Sri Lanka played three matches and won the series 2–0. Anwar scored 185 runs, including a century and a fifty. During the 2000–01, he played five matches against England, three at home and two at away; in both the series, he scored at averages less than 31 and 16 respectively. Anwar's last Test was against Bangladesh during the 2001–02 Asian Test Championship; he scored 101 runs in Pakistan's solitary innings which ensured an innings and 264 runs win at the Multan Cricket Stadium. His daughter died the same day.

=== One Day International career ===
Anwar played 247 ODI matches for Pakistan and scored 8824 runs from 244 innings at the average of 39.21. He is third in the list of leading run-scorers for Pakistan in the format after Inzamam-ul-Haq and Mohammad Yousuf. With 20 centuries, he is Pakistan's leading century-maker in ODIs. Anwar was the first Pakistani batsman to score a century against India on Indian soil in an ODI match.

Under the captaincy of Imran Khan, Anwar started his international career in January 1989 with an ODI match played at WACA Ground which Pakistan lost to West Indies. He scored only 3 runs in the match. His first match-winning performance came against India in December 1989 at Jinnah Stadium, Gujranwala. He scored unbeaten 42 runs off 32 balls in the match. In the 1989–90 World Series Cup, Anwar played nine matches and scored 293 runs with the help of a century, and at the average of 32.55. His best performance in the series was 126 runs against Sri Lanka at Adelaide Oval. His next performance was against New Zealand in 1990–91, when he was the top-scorer of the series, with 203 runs. Pakistan won the three-match series 3–0. In 1993, he made four ODI centuries at Sharjah Cricket Association Stadium, including three consecutive centuries against Sri Lanka, West Indies and Sri Lanka respectively, during 1993–94 Wills Trophy and became the second of the four players to do so. He scored two successive hundreds on three other occasions in his career, and was the first batsman to complete this feat in ODIs—in 1996, in 1999, and in 2000. In six matches of the 1994–95 Wills Trophy, he scored 202 runs at the average of 40.40, including a century. He scored a century against Sri Lanka at Gymkhana Club Ground in October 1996, while captaining the team.

On 21 May 1997 in Chennai, Anwar scored 194 against India in India in an ODI match in the 1997 Pepsi Independence Cup. Charles Coventry equalled the feat on 16 August 2009, against Bangladesh. This was the highest individual score by any men's batsman in the world till Sachin Tendulkar scored an unbeaten 200 against South Africa on 24 February 2010. Anwar's record stood as the overall ODI record across both men's and women's play for seven months as in the 1997 Women's Cricket World Cup, Australian batswomen Belinda Clark record a 229 not out. He accumulated 315 runs from the five matches of the 1998 Silver Jubilee Independence Cup, including 140 runs in the third final against India at Dhaka; India won the match by three wickets.

==== World Cup performance ====
Anwar played in three Cricket World Cups for Pakistan: 1996, 1999 and 2003. He played 21 matches and scored 915 runs at the average of 53.82, and his highest score in a world cup match remained 113 not out. In 1996 Cricket World Cup, Anwar made three fifties. Against India in the second Quarter-final at Bangalore, he made 48; Pakistan lost the match by 39 runs. In total, he made 329 in the tournament. In 1999 Cricket World Cup, he made two consecutive centuries, 103 against Zimbabwe and 113 not out against New Zealand in the Semi-final, and led Pakistan into the final. He scored 368 runs in the tournament. He played his last match against Zimbabwe during the 2003 World Cup in which he made unbeaten 40 runs. The match ended without result due to rain. In the previous match played against India which Pakistan lost by six wickets, he scored his fourth century against them and 20th overall. Anwar dedicated the century to his daughter, who died in 2001.

=== Captaincy ===
Anwar captained Pakistan in seven Tests and 11 ODIs, but his performance as captain was average.

=== Retirement ===
He announced his retirement from International cricket on 15 August 2003, after he was dropped from the squad for the upcoming One-Day International tournament in Sharjah.

== Playing style ==
Former Pakistan captain Ramiz Raja commented the "[Anwar] used an eclectic approach to batting – classical betrothed to unorthodox, footwork against spin as quick as a hiccup supple yet powerful to brush the field like a Picasso."

English cricket journalist Scyld Berry, writing in the context of Pakistan's 1996 tour of England, described Anwar's batting style as characterized by fluid movement and "hawk-like" wrist work, with his technique relying on moving his front foot and head well across to the line of the ball.

== Legacy ==
Writing in a 2020 retrospective, cricket writer Osman Samiuddin has argued that Saeed Anwar remains underrated: in ODIs, he was a pioneering aggressive opener who preceded the late-1990s limited-overs batting revolution led by Sanath Jayasuriya and Sachin Tendulkar, finishing the 1990s decade as the highest-scoring ODI opener in the world, and while Anwar is primarily remembered for his limited-overs exploits, Samiuddin also notes that his Test career is frequently overlooked despite exceptional metrics, considering that during the 1990s he recorded the second-highest batting average among all Test openers (with a minimum of 40 innings) and held the highest away batting average of any opener in that decade, at 45.66 (he scored Test centuries in six of the eight countries in which he played, including three overseas innings exceeding 150 runs that resulted in Pakistani victories.)

== Records and achievements ==
=== Awards ===
- Wisden Cricketer of the Year (1997)
- Pride of Performance (2000)

=== Trivial statistics ===
- Opened in 32 ODI innings with Aamir Sohail for Pakistan, in 1994–95, the most consecutive by a Pakistan opening pair and fourth overall.
- The third Pakistan batsman after Nazar Mohammed and Mudassar Nazar to carry his bat in a test innings. He scored unbeaten 188 runs in the match and Pakistan won the match by 46 runs. it was also the highest Test score by a Pakistani on Indian soil which was surpassed by Younis Khan in 2005.
- Anwar (194) and Charles Coventry (194*) shared the record for highest individual score in an ODI match until it was overtaken by the Sachin Tendulkar (200*) against South Africa on 24 February 2010 It remained a record for Pakistan until Fakhar Zaman made 210* against Zimbabwe on 20 July 2018.
- Anwar scored two or more successive hundreds on four occasions, and made 20 hundreds in One Day Internationals as a Pakistani opening batsman.
- He holds the highest Test batting average (59.06) of any Pakistani against Australia in Test matches.

== Performance ==
=== Test performance by opponent ===
Saeed Anwar's performance in Test matches
Opponent	Matches	inn	NO	Runs	HS	Ave	100	50	Ct
Australia	8	15	0	886	145	59.06	3	5	1
Bangladesh	1	1	0	101	101	101.00	1	0	0
England	8	14	0	545	176	38.92	1	3	4
India	3	6	1	289	188*	57.80	1	1	0
New Zealand	5	8	0	418	169	52.25	2	1	3
South Africa	7	15	0	279	118	23.25	1	1	1
Sri Lanka	11	16	0	919	136	57.43	2	8	6
West Indies	4	5	0	96	65	19.20	0	1	1
Zimbabwe	8	14	1	519	145	39.92	1	5	2
Total	55	91	2	4052	188*	45.52	11	25	18

=== ODI performance by opponent ===
Saeed Anwar's performance in ODI matches
Opponent	Matches	inn	NO	Runs	HS	Ave	100	50	Ct
Australia	30	30	1	683	104*	23.55	1	0	6
Bangladesh	6	6	1	285	90	57.00	0	3	3
England	11	11	0	488	77	44.36	0	5	1
India	50	48	2	2002	194	43.52	4	8	12
Kenya	3	3	0	29	27	9.66	0	0	0
Namibia	1	1	0	23	23	23.00	0	0	0
Netherlands	3	3	2	136	83*	136.00	0	1	0
New Zealand	32	32	4	1260	113*	45.00	4	7	5
Scotland	1	1	0	6	6	6.00	0	0	0
South Africa	24	24	1	398	42	17.30	0	0	1
Sri Lanka	52	52	3	2198	126	44.85	7	13	9
United Arab Emirates	2	2	1	79	40*	79.00	0	0	0
West Indies	17	16	1	534	131	35.60	2	2	4
Zimbabwe	15	15	3	703	103*	58.58	2	4	1
Total	247	244	19	8824	194	39.21	20	43	42

== See also ==
- Pairs on Test debut
- List of highest individual scores in ODIs
- List of Pakistan One Day International cricket records
- List of Cricket World Cup centuries
