= List of highest individual scores in One Day International cricket =

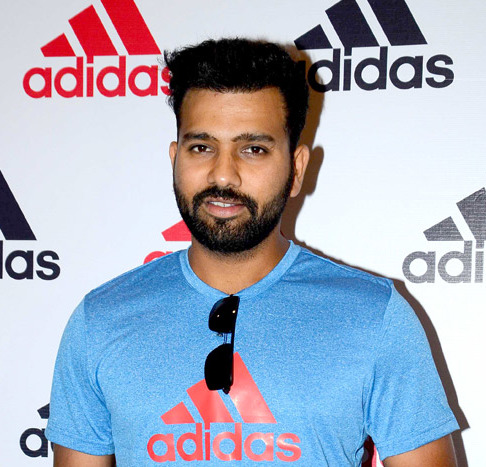
Rohit Sharma holds the record for highest individual score in an ODI innings, with 264. He also has the record for most ODI double centuries, with 3.

One Day International (ODI) cricket is played between international cricket teams affiliated to the International Cricket Council (ICC), the global governing body of cricket. Men's ODI cricket is played between teams which are Full members of the ICC and the top four Associate and Affiliate members who achieve ODI status temporarily. Since 2018, matches played by Associate and Affiliate members as part of the Asia Cup or the ICC World Cup are also considered as ODIs. In women's cricket matches played between the top 10 ranked teams – as announced by ICC – are given ODI status, as are matches played as a part of the ICC Women's World Cup or ICC Women's Championship. ODIs consist of one innings per team, with a limit to the number of overs. This limit is currently 50 overs, although in the past it has been 55 or 60 overs.

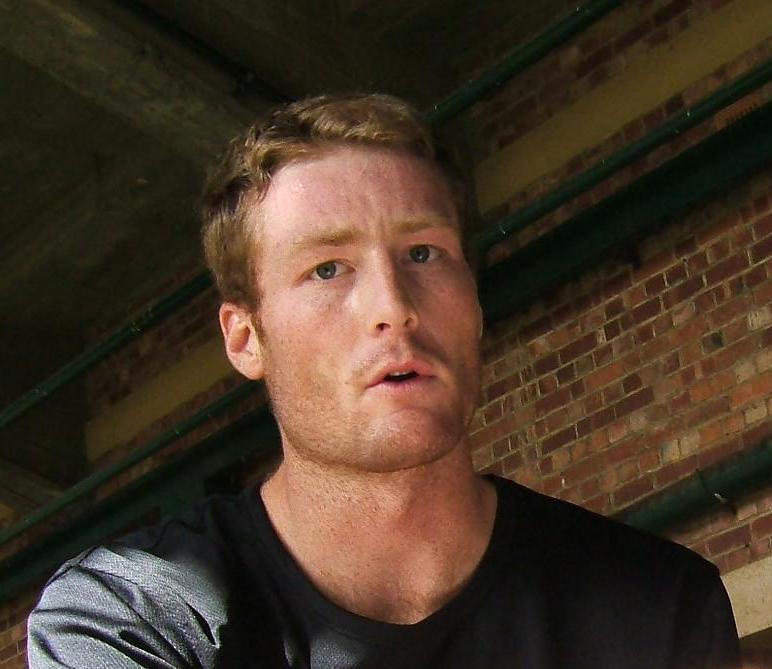
Martin Guptill is the highest individual scorer in any ICC tournament with 237 runs, the second highest individual score.

The earliest match now recognized as an ODI was played between England and Australia at Melbourne Cricket Ground in January 1971; since then there have been over 4,000 ODIs. In the first ODI match John Edrich of England scored the first half century. He scored 82 runs which remained the highest individual score for that match. Dennis Amiss of England scored the first century in the second ever ODI in the following year. He scored 103 runs against Australia at Old Trafford Cricket Ground on 24 August 1972. The record of highest individual score progressed with Roy Fredericks's 105 and David Lloyd's unbeaten 116. In June 1975, Glenn Turner of New Zealand scored the first 150 plus score. He scored an 171 runs against East Africa at Edgbaston Cricket Ground, Birmingham on 7 June 1975. The record was bettered by Kapil Dev of India with an unbeaten 175 runs against Zimbabwe in the 1983 World Cup. In 1984, Viv Richards of the West Indies further bettered the record with an unbeaten 189 runs against England at Old Trafford.

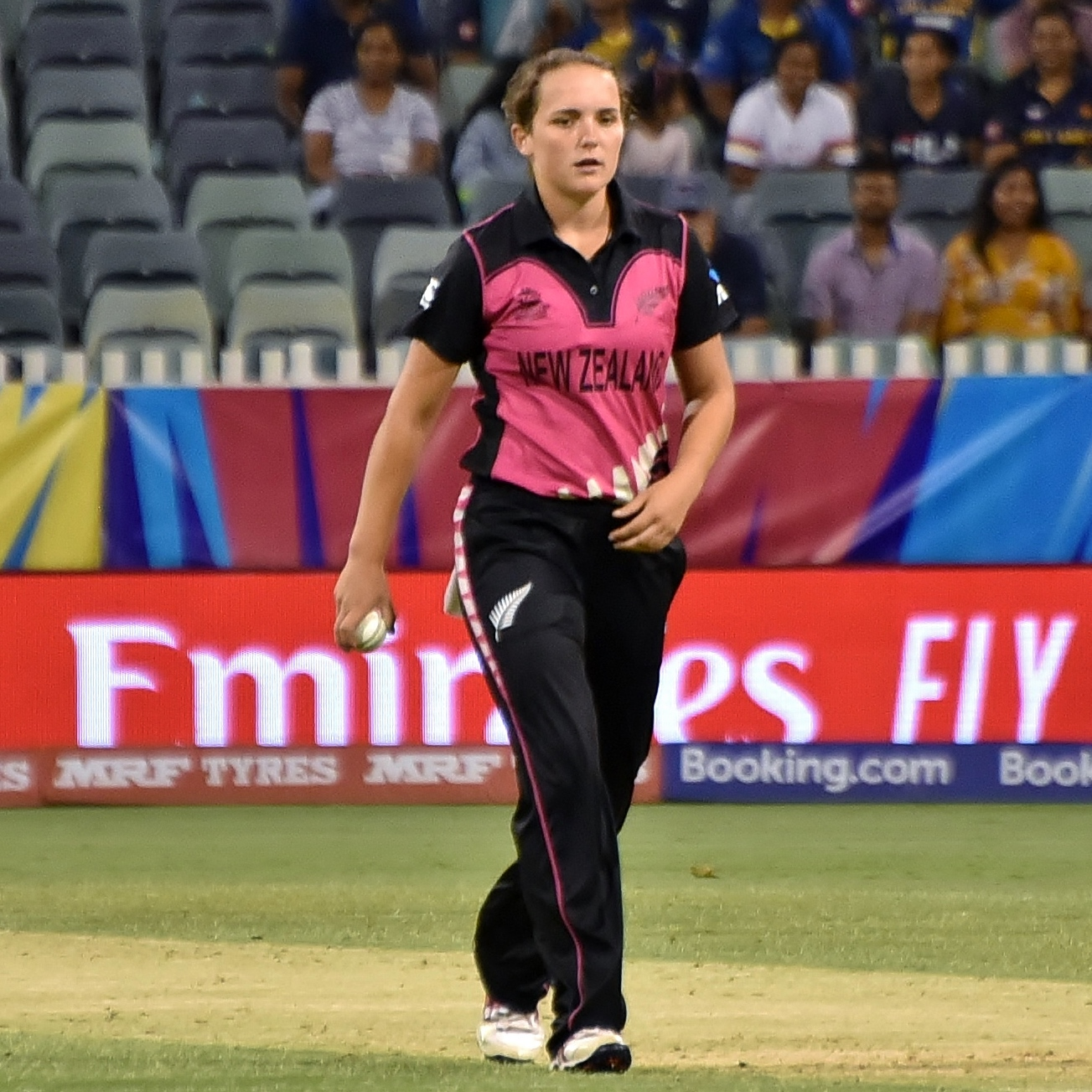
Amelia Kerr, the youngest player to score a double century, is the highest individual scorer in WODI history with a score of 232.

Until December 1997, no player had achieved a score of 200 in ODIs. The highest individual score up to that point was 194 by Saeed Anwar of Pakistan, scored on 21 May 1997 against India at the M. A. Chidambaram Stadium, Chennai. On 16 December of the same year, the Australian woman cricketer Belinda Clark broke the 200-run mark. She set the highest individual score; an unbeaten 229 runs against Denmark at the MIG Club Ground, Mumbai. This record remained for almost 17 years until Rohit Sharma of India broke it on 13 November 2014. He scored a 264 runs against Sri Lanka at Eden Gardens in Kolkata; this remains the highest individual score, as of May 2023. Clark's score remains the highest achieved by a captain, as well as the highest individual score in the Women's World Cup.

In men's cricket, Zimbabwe's Charles Coventry equalled Anwar's record after 12 years. He scored 194 not out against Bangladesh at Queens Sports Club in Bulawayo, on 16 August 2009. In men's cricket, the first player to score a double century was India's Sachin Tendulkar. He scored 200 not out against South Africa at Captain Roop Singh Stadium, Gwalior, on 24 February 2010. After this in 2011 Virender Sehwag scored highest 219 runs against west indies. At that time Sehwag became the second player to score a double century in Men's One Day Internationals. In women's cricket Amelia Kerr of New Zealand set a new highest individual score in women's ODI when she broke Belinda Clark's 21-year-old record on 13 June 2018, scoring an unbeaten 232 runs against Ireland. Kerr is also the youngest player to score a double century, achieving the feat at the age of 17. New Zealand's Martin Guptill is the highest individual scorer in any ICC tournament with an unbeaten 237 runs against the West Indies at Westpac Stadium, Wellington. in the 2015 Cricket World Cup. Rohit Sharma is the only player with three ODI double centuries having scored 209, 264 and 208*. On 10 December 2022, Ishan Kishan became the fourth Indian batsman to score a double century, scoring 210 runs against Bangladesh in the third ODI in the India vs Bangladesh ODI Series. On 18 January 2023, Shubman Gill became the second youngest player to score a double century, aged 23 years and 123 days old. His score of 208 runs against New Zealand in the first ODI of the 2023 India vs New Zealand ODI Series made him the fifth Indian and eleventh overall to score a double century. Harry Brook became the fastest player, and first English cricketer, to score a double century, in just 114 balls against SL beating the previous world record of 117 balls held by India's Shubman Gill.

== Keys ==
Key	Description
Inn.	The innings of the match
Strike rate	is the average number of runs scored per 100 balls faced in that particular innings
*	denotes that the batter remained not out
†	denotes the player was the captain of their side
♥	denotes the player was retired – not out
#	denotes the match was part of the ICC Cricket World Cup
‡	denotes the match was part of the ICC Women's World Cup
+	denotes that player scored 200 for the first time in ODI format

== Highest ODI individual scorers ==
As of 22 October 2026

=== Men ===
List of highest individual scores in ODIs
Rank	Name	Score	4s	6s	Strike rate	Inn.	Team	Opponent	Venue	Date	Result
1	Rohit Sharma	264	33	9	152.60	1	India	Sri Lanka	Eden Gardens, Kolkata	13 November 2014	Won
2	Martin Guptill	237* #	24	11	145.39	1	New Zealand	West Indies	Westpac Stadium, Wellington	21 March 2015	Won
3	Shubman Gill	223* †	26	8	167.67	2	India	West Indies	ACA Stadium, Guwahati	30 September 2026	Won
4	Virender Sehwag	219 †	25	7	146.97	1	India	West Indies	Holkar Cricket Stadium, Indore	8 December 2011	Won
5	Chris Gayle	215 #	10	16	146.25	1	West Indies	Zimbabwe	Manuka Oval, Canberra	24 February 2015	Won
6	Pathum Nissanka	210*	20	8	151.07	1	Sri Lanka	Afghanistan	Pallekele International Cricket Stadium, Kandy	9 February 2024	Won
7	Fakhar Zaman	210*	24	5	134.61	1	Pakistan	Zimbabwe	Queens Sports Club, Bulawayo	20 July 2018	Won
8	Ishan Kishan	210	24	10	160.30	1	India	Bangladesh	Zahur Ahmed Chowdhury Stadium, Chattogram	10 December 2022	Won
9	Rohit Sharma	209	12	16	132.28	1	India	Australia	M. Chinnaswamy Stadium, Bangalore	2 November 2013	Won
10	Rohit Sharma	208* †	13	12	135.94	1	India	Sri Lanka	PCA IS Bindra Stadium, Mohali	13 December 2017	Won
11	Shubman Gill	208	19	9	139.59	1	India	New Zealand	Rajiv Gandhi International Cricket Stadium, Hyderabad	18 January 2023	Won
12	Harry Brook	202	21	10	174.13	1	England	Sri Lanka	Rawalpindi Cricket Stadium, Rawalpindi	22 October 2026	Lost
13	Glenn Maxwell	201* #	21	10	157.03	2	Australia	Afghanistan	Wankhede Stadium, Mumbai	7 November 2023	Won
14	Sachin Tendulkar	200* +	25	3	136.05	1	India	South Africa	Captain Roop Singh Stadium, Gwalior	24 February 2010	Won

=== Women ===
List of highest individual scores in WODIs
Rank	Name	Score	4s	6s	Strike rate	Inn.	Team	Opponent	Venue	Date	Result
1	Amelia Kerr	232*	31	2	160.00	1	New Zealand	Ireland	Castle Avenue, Dublin	13 June 2018	Won
2	Belinda Clark	229* † ‡+	22	0	147.74	1	Australia	Denmark	Middle Income Group Club Ground, Mumbai	16 December 1997	Won
3	Chamari Athapaththu	195*†	26	5	140.28	2	Sri Lanka	South Africa	JB Marks Oval, Potchefstroom	17 April 2024	Won
4	Deepti Sharma	188	27	2	117.50	1	India	Ireland	JB Marks Oval, Potchefstroom	15 May 2017	Won
5	Laura Wolvaardt	184*†	23	4	125.17	1	South Africa	Sri Lanka	JB Marks Oval, Potchefstroom	17 April 2024	Lost
6	Hayley Matthews	182†	26	2	116.66	1	West Indies	Zimbabwe	Harare Sports Club, Harare	24 September 2026	Won
7	Amelia Kerr	179*†	23	1	128.77	2	New Zealand	South Africa	Basin Reserve, Wellington	1 April 2026	Won
8	Chamari Athapaththu	178* ‡	22	6	124.47	1	Sri Lanka	Australia	Bristol County Ground, Bristol	29 June 2017	Lost
9	Sidra Ameen	176*	20	1	116.55	1	Pakistan	Ireland	Gaddafi Stadium, Lahore	4 November 2022	Won
10	Charlotte Edwards	173* ‡	19	0	111.61	1	England	Ireland	Nehru Stadium, Pune	16 December 1997	Won

== Progression of highest individual score ==
=== Men ===
Progression of highest individual score in ODIs
Name	Score	4s	6s	Strike rate	Inn.	Team	Opponent	Venue	Date	Result	Duration of record
John Edrich	82	4	0	68.90	1	England	Australia	Melbourne Cricket Ground, Melbourne	5 January 1971	Lost	1 year, 232 days
Dennis Amiss	103	9	0	76.86	2	England	Australia	Old Trafford Cricket Ground, Manchester	24 August 1972	Won	1 year, 14 days
Roy Fredericks	105	10	1	86.06	2	West Indies	England	The Oval, Kennington	7 September 1973	Won	358 days
David Lloyd	116*	8	1	72.92	1	England	Pakistan	Trent Bridge, Nottinghamshire	31 August 1974	Lost	280 days
Glenn Turner	171* #	16	2	85.07	1	New Zealand	East Africa	Edgbaston Cricket Ground, Birmingham	7 June 1975	Won	8 years, 11 days
Kapil Dev	175* † #	16	6	126.81	1	India	Zimbabwe	Nevill Ground, Royal Tunbridge Wells	18 June 1983	Won	348 days
Vivian Richards	189* †	21	5	111.18	1	West Indies	England	Old Trafford Cricket Ground, Manchester	31 May 1984	Won	12 years, 355 days
Saeed Anwar	194	22	5	132.88	1	Pakistan	India	M. A. Chidambaram Stadium, Chennai	21 May 1997	Won	12 years, 87 days
Charles Coventry	194*	16	7	134.35	1	Zimbabwe	Bangladesh	Queens Sports Club, Bulawayo	16 August 2009	Lost	192 days
Sachin Tendulkar	200*	25	3	136.05	1	India	South Africa	Captain Roop Singh Stadium, Gwalior	24 February 2010	Won	1 year, 287 days
Virender Sehwag	219 †	25	7	146.97	1	India	West Indies	Holkar Cricket Stadium, Indore	8 December 2011	Won	2 years, 340 days
Rohit Sharma	264	33	9	152.63	1	India	Sri Lanka	Eden Gardens, Kolkata	13 November 2014	Won	12 years, 6 days

=== Women ===
Progression of highest individual score in WODIs
Name	Score	4s	6s	Strike rate	Inn.	Team	Opponent	Venue	Date	Result
Lynne Thomas	134 ‡	6			1	England	International XI	County Cricket Ground, Hove	23 June 1973	Won
Janette Brittin	138* ‡	11			1	England	International XI	Seddon Park, Hamilton	14 January 1982	Won
Lindsay Reeler	143* ‡				1	Australia	Netherlands	Willetton Sports Club No.1, Perth	29 November 1988	Won
Lisa Keightley	156*	15	0	106.12	1	Australia	Pakistan	Wesley Cricket Ground, Melbourne	7 February 1997	Won
Belinda Clark	229* ‡	22	0	147.74	1	Australia	Denmark	MIG Club Ground, Mumbai	16 December 1997	Won
Amelia Kerr	232*	31	2	160.00	1	New Zealand	Ireland	Castle Avenue, Dublin	13 June 2018	Won

== See also ==
- List of highest individual scores in cricket
- List of Cricket World Cup centuries
- List of One Day International cricket records
- List of women's One Day International cricket records
- Lists of cricket records
