= Pakistani cricket team in Sri Lanka in 2000 =

The Pakistan national cricket team toured Sri Lanka in 2000 to play a three-match Test series against Sri Lanka and the 2000 Singer Triangular Series, which also included South Africa. Pakistan won the Test series against Sri Lanka 2–0 with one match drawn.

== Test series summary ==
=== 1st Test ===
14–17 June 2000
(5-day match)
Scorecard

Sri Lanka	v	Pakistan
273 (97.2 overs); DPMD Jayawardene 77 (145); Arshad Khan 4/62 (31 overs)		266 (120.5 overs); Wasim Akram 78 (204); M Muralitharan 5/115 (47 overs)
123 (61.3 overs); MS Atapattu 40 (96); Wasim Akram 5/45 (15.3 overs)		131/5 (42 overs); Younis Khan 32* (47); M Muralitharan 3/53 (17 overs)

Pakistan won by 5 wickets
Singhalese Sports Club Cricket Ground, Colombo
Umpires: SA Bucknor (WI) and BC Cooray (SL)
Player of the match: Wasim Akram (PAK)

- Sri Lanka won the toss and elected to bat.
- The match was scheduled for five days but completed in four.
- CRD Fernando (SL) made his Test debut.

=== 2nd Test ===
21–24 June 2000
(5-day match)
Scorecard

Sri Lanka	v	Pakistan
181 (64.3 overs); DPMD Jayawardene 72 (127); Abdur Razzaq 3/35 (12 overs)		600/8d (175.2 overs); Saeed Anwar 123 (237); M Muralitharan 4/138 (50 overs)
256 (90.1 overs); A Ranatunga 65 (80); Waqar Younis 4/40 (19.1 overs)

Pakistan won by an innings and 163 runs
Galle International Stadium, Galle
Umpires: EAR de Silva (SL) and RB Tiffin (ZIM)
Player of the match: Wasim Akram (PAK)

- Sri Lanka won the toss and elected to bat.
- The match was scheduled for five days but completed in four.

=== 3rd Test ===
28 June–2 July 2000
(5-day match)
Scorecard

Sri Lanka	v	Pakistan
467/5 (155.4 overs); MS Atapattu 207* (457); Arshad Khan 3/137 (52 overs)

Match drawn
Asgiriya Stadium, Kandy
Umpires: SA Bucknor (WI) and PT Manuel (SL)

- Sri Lanka won the toss and elected to bat.
- There was no play on the fourth or fifth days.
- HAPW Jayawardene (SL) made his Test debut.
