= Martin Guptill =

New Zealand cricketer (born 1986)

Martin Guptill MNZM
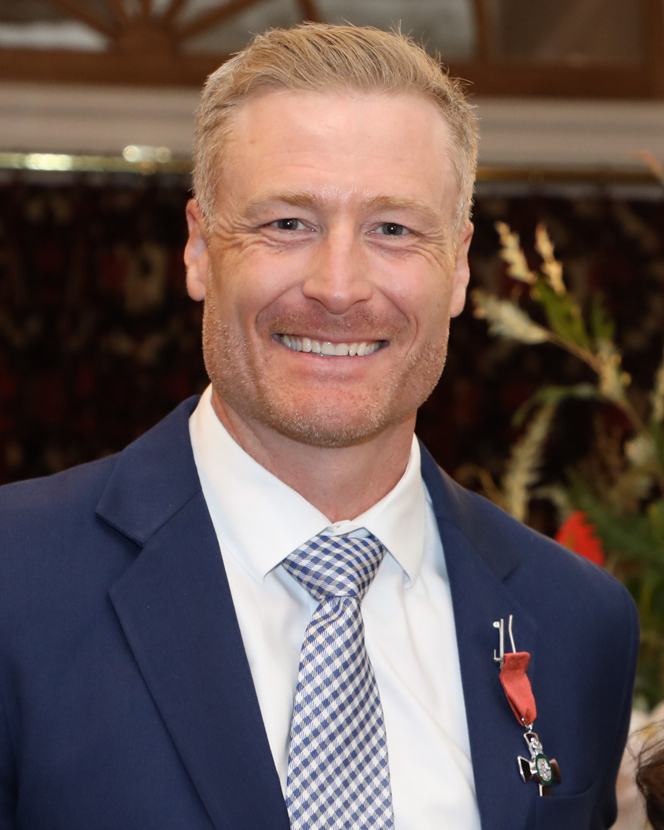
- Guptill in 2026

Personal information
- Full name: Martin James Guptill
- Born: 30 September 1986 (age 40); Auckland, New Zealand
- Nickname: Two Toes
- Height: 6 ft 2 in (1.88 m)
- Batting: Right-handed
- Bowling: Right-arm off-break
- Role: Opening batter
- Relatives: Michael Guptill-Bunce (cousin)

International information
- National side: New Zealand (2009–2022)
- Test debut (cap 243): 18 March 2009 v India
- Last Test: 8 October 2016 v India
- ODI debut (cap 153): 10 January 2009 v West Indies
- Last ODI: 8 September 2022 v Australia
- ODI shirt no.: 31
- T20I debut (cap 37): 15 February 2009 v Australia
- Last T20I: 12 October 2022 v Bangladesh
- T20I shirt no.: 31

Domestic team information
- Years: Team
- 2005/06–present: Auckland
- 2011–2015: Derbyshire
- 2012/13: Sydney Thunder
- 2013–2014 2016–2017: Guyana Amazon Warriors
- 2015: St Kitts & Nevis Patriots
- 2016: Mumbai Indians
- 2016: Lancashire
- 2017: Kings XI Punjab
- 2018–2019: Worcestershire
- 2018: Barbados Tridents
- 2019: Sunrisers Hyderabad
- 2021: Karachi Kings
- 2022/23: Melbourne Renegades
- 2023: Quetta Gladiators
- 2023: Trinbago Knight Riders
- 2024: Islamabad United
- 2024/25: Biratnagar Kings

Career statistics
Competition	Test	ODI	T20I	FC
Matches	47	198	122	119
Runs scored	2,586	7,346	3,531	7,802
Batting average	29.38	41.73	31.81	38.43
100s/50s	3/17	18/39	2/20	17/40
Top score	189	237*	105	227
Balls bowled	428	109	6	854
Wickets	8	4	0	11
Bowling average	37.25	24.50	–	61.27
5 wickets in innings	0	0	–	0
10 wickets in match	0	0	–	0
Best bowling	3/11	2/6	–	3/11
Catches/stumpings	50/–	104/–	68/–	139/–
Medal record
Men's Cricket
Representing New Zealand
ICC Cricket World Cup
Runner-up	2015 Australia and New Zealand
Runner-up	2019 England and Wales
ICC T20 World Cup
Runner-up	2021 UAE and Oman
- Source: ESPNcricinfo, 23 September 2025

Martin James Guptill MNZM (born 30 September 1986) is a New Zealand cricketer who played for New Zealand as an opening batsman in all formats of the game. Guptill is the first cricketer from New Zealand and the fifth overall to have scored a double century in a One Day International match and holds the current record for the highest individual score in a Cricket World Cup match and the second highest score in One Day Internationals of 237 not out. In March 2021, Guptill played in his 100th Twenty20 International match. He was part of the New Zealand squads to finish as runners-up in two Cricket World Cup finals in 2015 and 2019.

In January 2025 Guptill confirmed his retirement from international cricket, having last played for New Zealand in October 2022.

== Personal life ==
Guptill was born in Auckland in 1986. He attended Kelston Primary and Avondale College where he played cricket and was prefect. His wife is journalist Laura McGoldrick, whilst his cousin, Michael Guptill-Bunce, has also played cricket for Auckland.

Guptill has only two toes on his left foot. At the age of 13, he was involved in a forklift accident and lost three toes. He is nicknamed "Two Toes" within the New Zealand cricket squad. He studied at Kelston Boys High School for four years but, in his final year of secondary school, he switched to Avondale College.

== Domestic and T20 cricket ==
In domestic cricket, Guptill plays for Auckland, and for Suburbs New Lynn in club cricket. He made his first-class cricket debut in March 2006, scoring a four-ball duck in his first innings, and 99 in his second. In 2011 Guptill played in English county cricket during the second half of the season for Derbyshire County Cricket Club.

Guptill played for Mumbai Indians in the 2016 Indian Premier League as a replacement for the injured Lendl Simmons and for Kings XI Punjab in the 2017 Indian Premier League. In December 2018, he was bought by the Sunrisers Hyderabad in the player auction for the 2019 Indian Premier League.

In July 2019, he was selected to play for the Edinburgh Rocks in the inaugural edition of the Euro T20 Slam cricket tournament. However, the following month the tournament was cancelled. He was released by the Sunrisers Hyderabad ahead of the 2020 IPL auction.

In April 2021, he was signed by Karachi Kings to play in the rescheduled matches in the 2021 Pakistan Super League. In July 2022, he was signed by Kandy Falcons in 2022 Lanka Premier League.

In October 2023, Guptill was named in Urbanrisers Hyderabad's squad in the 2nd edition of the Legends League Cricket.

In 2024, he was signed by Biratnagar Kings to play 2024 Nepal Premier League. In December 2024, he became the first player to score fifty in Nepal Premier League.

== International cricket ==
Guptill first represented New Zealand in the Under-19 Cricket World Cup held in Sri Lanka in 2006. He made his One Day International (ODI) debut for New Zealand on 10 January 2009 against the West Indies in Auckland, becoming the first New Zealander to score a century on his one-day debut – his score of 122 not out is the highest score on debut for New Zealand in an ODI, and second highest debut score ever in ODIs and he was the first New Zealander to carry the bat through a completed ODI innings. He made his Test cricket debut against India in the first Test at Hamilton in March 2009, scoring 14 and 48. For his performances in 2009, he was named in the World ODI XI by the ICC.

For his performances in the 2011–12 season, he won the Sir Richard Hadlee Medal. He was awarded the T20 Player of the Year by NZC for the 2011–12 season.

In the New Zealand 2013 tour of England, Guptill scored back-to-back undefeated hundreds at Lord's and Southampton, scoring 189 not out, at the time the highest score by a New Zealander in an ODI, and contributed to the then fifth-highest team total in ODI history (359).

Guptill surpassed his best score in the 2015 World Cup, scoring an unbeaten 237 from 163 balls against West Indies in the quarter-finals at the Westpac Stadium in Wellington. He was the first player to score a double century in a knockout stage match as New Zealand scored 393, the then best total in a World Cup knockout match. After scoring three ducks in group matches he ended the tournament with 547 runs, emerging as the highest scorer.

In May 2018, he was one of twenty players to be awarded a new contract for the 2018–19 season by New Zealand Cricket. In April 2019, he was named in New Zealand's squad for the 2019 Cricket World Cup. In August 2021, Guptill was named in New Zealand's squad for the 2021 ICC Men's T20 World Cup. On 3 November 2021, in New Zealand's T20 World Cup match against Scotland, Guptill became the second batsman to score 3,000 runs in T20I cricket.

In 2023 Guptil was drafted to the Trinbago Knight Riders squad for the annual Caribbean Premier League which he made his debut in 2013. He's played a total of 58 matches in the league for various squads and has garnered 1505 runs with a regular strike rate of over 110.

== Exclusion and retirement ==
After being omitted from the squad for the 2022 India T20 series, Guptill released himself from his national contract, bringing to an end the veteran batsman's international career. On 8 January 2025, Guptill formally announced his retirement from international cricket, bringing an end to his 13-year long international career (367 games overall) with 2586 runs in 47 Tests, 7346 runs in 198 ODIs and 3531 runs in 122 T20Is.

In the 2026 New Year Honours, Guptill was appointed a Member of the New Zealand Order of Merit, for services to cricket.

== Records ==
- Guptill scored back to back unbeaten ODI centuries against England in 2013. He scored 330 runs in the three-match ODI series, a world record for most runs in a three-match bilateral ODI series at the time.
- He was the first New Zealander and the fifth player overall to score a double century in an ODI. His 237 not out remains the highest individual score in World Cup cricket and the second highest score in ODIs.
- In January 2018, Guptill became the second New Zealand player and ninth overall to score a century against each of the other nine full member Test-playing nations.
- As of February 2019, Guptill had scored the second most runs in Twenty20 Internationals

=== Career best performances ===
Guptill scored three Test, 18 ODI and two Twenty20 International centuries. In total he has made 17 first-class, 31 List A and six Twenty20 centuries as of September 2025.

Guptill's first international century was made in his New Zealand debut in an ODI against the West Indies at Auckland in 2009. Guptil's innings of 122 not out was described as "one of the best I've seen in a long time" by the New Zealand captain Daniel Vettori. His century was the first by a New Zealander on their ODI debut. He went on to make the highest ODI score by a New Zealander at Southampton in June 2013, scoring 189 not out against England. At the time the score was the fifth highest in any ODI and equalled the highest individual score made against England, previously made by Sir Viv Richards.

Guptill went on to set a new ODI record for New Zealand when he made the highest score of his career, 237 not out in the 2015 World Cup against West Indies at Wellington. The innings was the second highest scoring individual innings in ODI history and remains Guptill's highest score in any form of cricket. His other double-century was made playing for Derbyshire in a 2015 County Championship match at Bristol. This was his only first-class double century.

== See also ==
- List of One Day International cricket double centuries
