= History of cricket in Pakistan from 1986 to 2000 =

This article describes the history of cricket in Pakistan from the 1985–86 season to 1999–2000.

== Events ==
Pakistan won the 1992 Cricket World Cup, beating England by 22 runs in the final at the Melbourne Cricket Ground on 25 March 1992.

Notable Pakistan players in this period include Javed Miandad, Imran Khan, Inzamam-ul-Haq, Mushtaq Ahmed, Waqar Younis, Wasim Akram and Saqlain Mushtaq.

== National championships ==
Winners of the Qaid-i-Azam Trophy from 1986 to 2000 were:

- 1985–86 – Karachi
- 1986–87 – National Bank
- 1987–88 – PIA
- 1988–89 – ADBP
- 1989–90 – PIA
- 1990–91 – Karachi Whites
- 1991–92 – Karachi Whites
- 1992–93 – Karachi Whites
- 1993–94 – Lahore City
- 1994–95 – Karachi Blues
- 1995–96 – Karachi Blues
- 1996–97 – Lahore City
- 1997–98 – Karachi Blues
- 1998–99 – Peshawar
- 1999–2000 – PIA

Winners of the BCCP Patron's Trophy from 1986 to 2000 were:

- 1985–86 – Karachi Whites
- 1986–87 – National Bank
- 1987–88 – Habib Bank
- 1988–89 – Karachi
- 1989–90 – Karachi Whites
- 1990–91 – ADBP
- 1991–92 – Habib Bank
- 1992–93 – Habib Bank
- 1993–94 – ADBP
- 1994–95 – Allied Bank

the trophy was renamed the PCB Patron's Trophy in 1995

- 1995–96 – ADBP
- 1996–97 – United Bank
- 1997–98 – Habib Bank
- 1998–99 – Habib Bank
- 1999–2000 – Lahore City Blues

Winners of the limited overs knockout tournament from 1986 to 2000 were:

the trophy was called the Wills Cup until 1998

- 1985–86 – PIA
- 1986–87 – Habib Bank
- 1987–88 – PIA
- 1988–89 – United Bank
- 1989–90 – Habib Bank
- 1990–91 – Habib Bank
- 1991–92 – Habib Bank
- 1992–93 – National Bank
- 1993–94 – Habib Bank
- 1994–95 – National Bank
- 1995–96 – PIA
- 1996–97 – Allied Bank
- 1997–98 – Allied Bank

the trophy was renamed the Tissot Cup in 1998

- 1998–99 – Allied Bank
- 1999–2000 – PIA

the trophy was renamed the One Day National Tournament in 2000

== International tours of Pakistan ==
=== Sri Lanka 1985–86 ===
- 1st Test at Iqbal Stadium, Faisalabad – match drawn
- 2nd Test at Jinnah Stadium, Sialkot – Pakistan won by 8 wickets
- 3rd Test at National Stadium, Karachi – Pakistan won by 10 wickets

=== West Indies 1986–87 ===
- 1st Test at Iqbal Stadium, Faisalabad – Pakistan won by 186 runs
- 2nd Test at Gaddafi Stadium, Lahore – West Indies won by an innings and 10 runs
- 3rd Test at National Stadium, Karachi – match drawn

=== England 1987–88 ===
- 1st Test at Gaddafi Stadium, Lahore – Pakistan won by an innings and 87 runs
- 2nd Test at Iqbal Stadium, Faisalabad – match drawn
- 3rd Test at National Stadium, Karachi – match drawn

=== Australia 1988–89 ===
- 1st Test at National Stadium, Karachi – Pakistan won by an innings and 88 runs
- 2nd Test at Iqbal Stadium, Faisalabad – match drawn
- 3rd Test at Gaddafi Stadium, Lahore – match drawn

For more details of this tour, see : Australian cricket team in Pakistan in 1988–89

=== India 1989–90 ===
- 1st Test at National Stadium, Karachi – match drawn
- 2nd Test at Iqbal Stadium, Faisalabad – match drawn
- 3rd Test at Gaddafi Stadium, Lahore – match drawn
- 4th Test at Jinnah Stadium, Sialkot – match drawn

=== New Zealand 1990–91 ===
- 1st Test at National Stadium, Karachi – Pakistan won by an innings and 43 runs
- 2nd Test at Gaddafi Stadium, Lahore – Pakistan won by 9 wickets
- 3rd Test at Iqbal Stadium, Faisalabad – Pakistan won by 65 runs

=== West Indies 1990–91 ===
- 1st Test at National Stadium, Karachi – Pakistan won by 8 wickets
- 2nd Test at Iqbal Stadium, Faisalabad – West Indies won by 7 wickets
- 3rd Test at Gaddafi Stadium, Lahore – match drawn

=== Sri Lanka 1991–92 ===
- 1st Test at Jinnah Stadium, Sialkot – match drawn
- 2nd Test at Jinnah Stadium, Gujranwala – match drawn
- 3rd Test at Iqbal Stadium, Faisalabad – Pakistan won by 3 wickets

=== Zimbabwe 1993–94 ===
- 1st Test at Defence Housing Authority Stadium, Karachi – Pakistan won by 131 runs
- 2nd Test at Rawalpindi Cricket Stadium – Pakistan won by 52 runs
- 3rd Test at Gaddafi Stadium, Lahore – match drawn

=== Australia 1994–95 ===
- 1st Test at National Stadium, Karachi – Pakistan won by 1 wicket
- 2nd Test at Rawalpindi Cricket Stadium – match drawn
- 3rd Test at Gaddafi Stadium, Lahore – match drawn

For more details of this tour, see : Australian cricket team in Pakistan in 1994–95

=== Sri Lanka 1995–96 ===
- 1st Test at Arbab Niaz Stadium, Peshawar – Pakistan won by an innings and 40 runs
- 2nd Test at Iqbal Stadium, Faisalabad – Sri Lanka won by 42 runs
- 3rd Test at Jinnah Stadium, Sialkot – Sri Lanka won by 144 runs

=== New Zealand 1996–97 ===
- 1st Test at Gaddafi Stadium, Lahore – New Zealand won by 44 runs
- 2nd Test at Rawalpindi Cricket Stadium – Pakistan won by an innings and 13 runs

For more details of this tour, see : New Zealand cricket team in Pakistan in 1996–97

=== Zimbabwe 1996–97 ===
- 1st Test at Sheikhupura Stadium – match drawn
- 2nd Test at Iqbal Stadium, Faisalabad – Pakistan won by 10 wickets

=== South Africa 1997–98 ===
- 1st Test at Rawalpindi Cricket Stadium – match drawn
- 2nd Test at Sheikhupura Stadium – match drawn
- 3rd Test at Iqbal Stadium, Faisalabad – South Africa won by 53 runs

=== West Indies 1997–98 ===
- 1st Test at Arbab Niaz Stadium, Peshawar – Pakistan won by an innings and 19 runs
- 2nd Test at Rawalpindi Cricket Stadium – Pakistan won by an innings and 29 runs
- 3rd Test at National Stadium, Karachi – Pakistan won by 10 wickets

=== Australia 1998–99 ===
- 1st Test at Rawalpindi Cricket Stadium – Australia won by an innings and 99 runs
- 2nd Test at Arbab Niaz Stadium, Peshawar – match drawn
- 3rd Test at National Stadium, Karachi – match drawn

For more details of this tour, see : Australian cricket team in Pakistan in 1998–99

=== Asian Test Championship 1998–99 ===
- Pakistan v Sri Lanka at Gaddafi Stadium, Lahore – match drawn
- Pakistan v Sri Lanka at Bangabandhu National Stadium, Dhaka – Pakistan won by an innings and 175 runs

For more details of this tournament, see : 1998–99 Asian Test Championship

=== Zimbabwe 1998–99 ===
- 1st Test at Arbab Niaz Stadium, Peshawar – Zimbabwe won by 7 wickets
- 2nd Test at Gaddafi Stadium, Lahore – match drawn
- 3rd Test at Iqbal Stadium, Faisalabad – game abandoned due to persistent rain; no toss was made

=== Sri Lanka 1999–2000 ===
- 1st Test at Rawalpindi Cricket Stadium – Sri Lanka won by 2 wickets
- 2nd Test at Arbab Niaz Stadium, Peshawar – Sri Lanka won by 57 runs
- 3rd Test at National Stadium, Karachi – Pakistan won by 222 runs

== Bibliography ==
- First Class Cricket in Pakistan (5 volumes) by Abid Ali Kazi
- Playfair Cricket Annual
- Wisden Cricketers Almanack (annual)

== External sources ==
- CricketArchive – List of Tournaments in Pakistan
