= Pakistani cricket team in England in 1996 =

International cricket tour

Pakistan in England 1996
	Pakistan	England
- Dates: 27 June – 1 September 1996
Captains	Wasim Akram	Mike Atherton

Test series
- Result: Pakistan won the 3-match series 2–0
Most runs	Saeed Anwar (362)	Alec Stewart (396)
Most wickets	Mushtaq Ahmed (17)	Dominic Cork (12)
- Player of the series: Mushtaq Ahmed (Pak), Alec Stewart (Eng)

One Day International series
- Results: England won the 3-match series 2–1
Most runs	Ijaz Ahmed (186)	Nick Knight (264)
Most wickets	Wasim Akram (6)	Adam Hollioake (8)
- Player of the series: Ijaz Ahmed (Pak), Nick Knight (Eng)

The Pakistani cricket team toured England in the 1996 English cricket season to play a three-match Test series against England.

Pakistan won the series 2-0 with one match drawn.

== Test series summary ==
=== First Test ===
25–29 July 1996
(5-day match)
Scorecard

Pakistan	v	England
340 (108.2 overs); Inzamam-ul-Haq 148 (218); AD Mullally 3/44 (24 overs)		285 (102.4 overs); GP Thorpe 77 (167); Waqar Younis 4/69 (24 overs)
352/5d (113.2 overs); Saeed Anwar 88 (144); DG Cork 3/86 (24 overs)		243 (97.1 overs); AJ Stewart 89 (189); Mushtaq Ahmed 5/57 (38 overs)

Pakistan won by 164 runs
Lord's, London
Umpires: SA Bucknor (WI) and P Willey (Eng)
Player of the match: Waqar Younis (Pak)

- Pakistan won the toss and elected to bat.
- Shadab Kabir (Pak) and SJE Brown (Eng) made their Test debuts.

=== Second Test ===
8–12 August 1996
(5-day match)
Scorecard

Pakistan	v	England
448 (153.2 overs); Ijaz Ahmed 141 (201); DG Cork 5/113 (37 overs)		501 (156.5 overs); AJ Stewart 170 (315); Wasim Akram 3/106 (39.5 overs)
242/7d (81 overs); Inzamam-ul-Haq 65 (83); AR Caddick 3/52 (17 overs)

Match drawn
Headingley, Leeds
Umpires: SA Bucknor (WI) and DR Shepherd (Eng)
Player of the match: AJ Stewart (Eng)

- England won the toss and elected to field.

=== Third Test ===
22–26 August 1996
(5-day match)
Scorecard

England	v	Pakistan
326 (99.2 overs); JP Crawley 106 (217); Waqar Younis 4/95 (25 overs)		521/8d (159.1 overs); Saeed Anwar 176 (264); AD Mullally 3/97 (37.1 overs)
242 (82.4 overs); AJ Stewart 54 (100); Mushtaq Ahmed 6/78 (37 overs)		48/1 (6.4 overs); Aamer Sohail 29* (17); AD Mullally 1/24 (3 overs)

Pakistan won by 9 wickets
The Oval, London
Umpires: BC Cooray (SL) and MJ Kitchen (Eng)
Player of the match: Mushtaq Ahmed (Pak)

- England won the toss and elected to bat.
- RDB Croft (Eng) made his Test debut.

== One Day Internationals (ODIs) ==
England won the Texaco Trophy 2-1.

=== 1st ODI ===
29 August 1996
Scorecard

Pakistan; 225/5 (50 overs)	v	England; 226/5 (46.4 overs)
Saeed Anwar 57 (75); RDB Croft 2/36 (10 overs)		MA Atherton 65 (93); Wasim Akram 3/45 (9.4 overs)

England won by 5 wickets
Old Trafford, Manchester
Umpires: NT Plews and G Sharp
Player of the match: MA Atherton (Eng)

- Pakistan won the toss and elected to bat.
- RDB Croft, DW Headley, NV Knight, GD Lloyd and AD Mullally (all ENG) made their ODI debuts.

=== 2nd ODI ===
31 August 1996
Scorecard

England; 292/8 (50 overs)	v	Pakistan; 185 (37.5 overs)
NV Knight 113 (132); Mushtaq Ahmed 2/33 (10 overs)		Ijaz Ahmed 79 (80); AJ Hollioake 4/23 (6.5 overs)

England won by 107 runs
Edgbaston, Birmingham
Umpires: MJ Kitchen and P Willey
Player of the match: NV Knight (Eng)

- Pakistan won the toss and elected to field.
- AJ Hollioake (ENG) made his ODI debut.

=== 3rd ODI ===
1 September 1996
Scorecard

England; 246 (50 overs)	v	Pakistan; 247/8 (49.4 overs)
NV Knight 125* (145); Wasim Akram 3/45 (10 overs)		Saeed Anwar 61 (59); AJ Hollioake 4/45 (8.4 overs)

Pakistan won by 2 wickets
Trent Bridge, Nottingham
Umpires: JW Holder and DR Shepherd
Player of the match: Pakistan team

- England won the toss and elected to bat.
- Shadab Kabir, Shahid Anwar and Shahid Nazir (all Pak) made their ODI debuts.
