= New Zealand cricket team in Pakistan in 1996–97 =

International cricket tour

	New Zealand	Pakistan
- Dates: November 1996 – December 1996
Captains	Lee Germon	Saeed Anwar

Test series
- Result: 2-match series drawn 1–1
Most runs	Stephen Fleming (182)	Saeed Anwar (157)
Most wickets	Simon Doull (10)	Mushtaq Ahmed (18)
- Player of the series: Stephen Fleming (NZ) and Saeed Anwar (Pak)

One Day International series
- Results: Pakistan won the 3-match series 2–1
Most runs	Stephen Fleming (172)	Zahoor Elahi (142)
Most wickets	Chris Harris (8)	Saqlain Mushtaq (7)
- Player of the series: Stephen Fleming (NZ) and Saeed Anwar (Pak)

The New Zealand national cricket team toured Pakistan during the 1996–97 cricket season. The tour consisted of a first-class game against an invitational Pakistani Cricket board XI, followed by two Test matches and three One Day International games. The hosts and tourists shared honours in the Test series, drawing 1–1, though New Zealand won with only a narrow 44-run margin in the first Test, and lost the second by an innings and ten runs. New Zealand's Stephen Fleming enjoyed a successful series with the bat, scoring 182 runs at 60.66 in the Test series and 172 runs at 86.00 in the ODI matches, though the rest of the New Zealand batting line-up were said by the New Zealand press to have let the side down with the bat during the Test matches. Nathan Astle, questioned over his place during the tour, redeemed himself with a half century in the final ODI match to alleviate heavy media pressure.

Three Pakistan batsmen – Mohammad Wasim, Saeed Anwar and Ijaz Ahmed – all hit Test centuries. Ahmed also topped the Pakistan ODI batting averages. Mushtaq Ahmed was the most prolific wicket taker in the Test matches, with 18 wickets. Fleming and Anwar were both named Player of the Series in the Test and the ODI matches for their performances. The start of the series was overshadowed by political upheaval with the removal of Prime Minister Benazir Bhutto and rumours of violent unrest in Pakistan. Danny Morrison, New Zealand's "premier strike bowler" also pulled out with an injury.

== Background ==
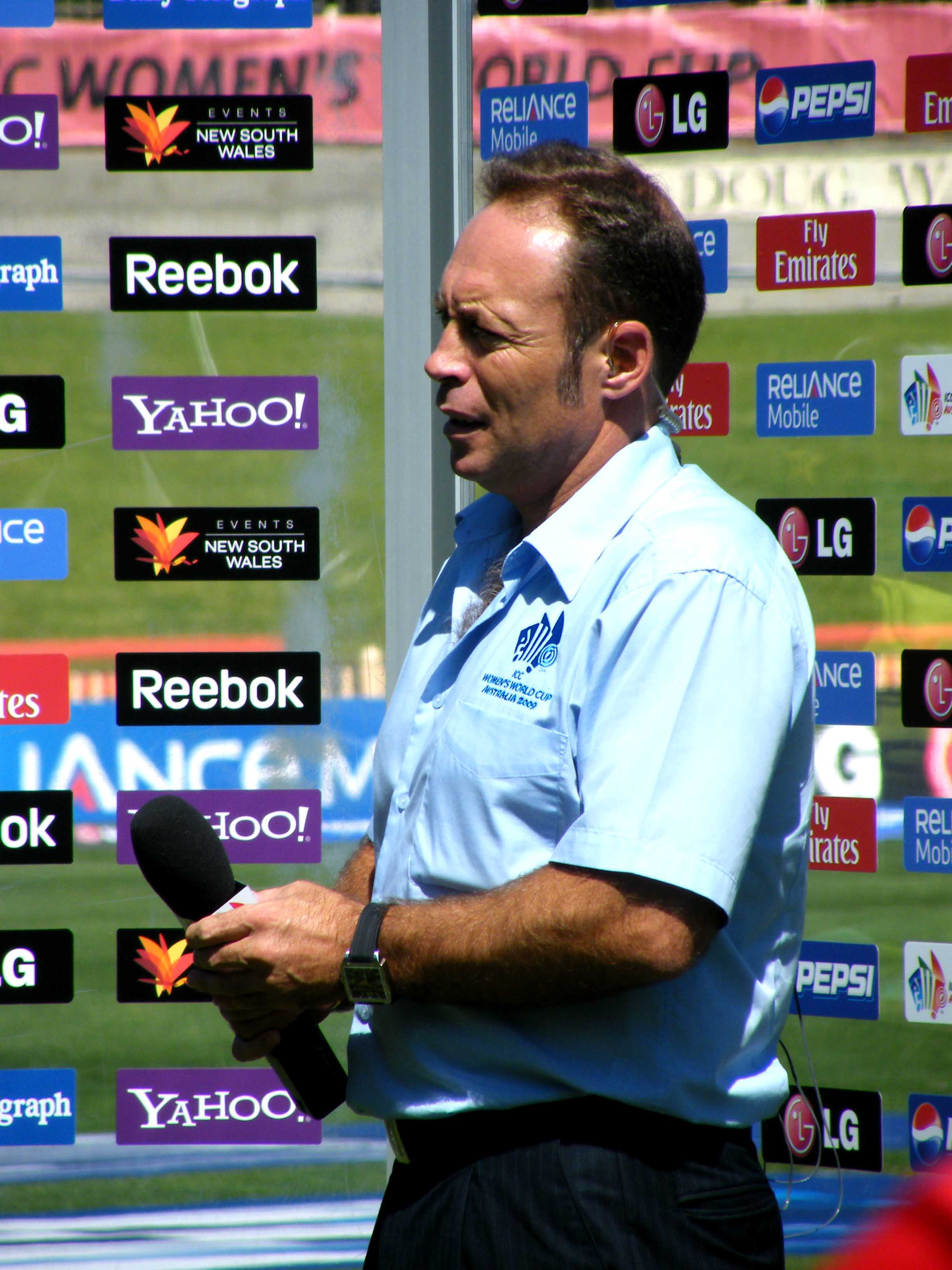
Danny Morrison, the lead strike bowler for New Zealand at the time, prompted concerns for the team's chances when he pulled out of the tour with a groin injury. Seen in this photo at the Women's Cricket World Cup, Sydney, March 2009.

New Zealand faced several problems on the eve of their 1996–97 tour of Pakistan. Initially, over questions of safety, the New Zealand Cricket Board considered cancelling the tour in light of the removal of Prime Minister Benazir Bhutto and the resulting political fallout. Majid Khan, the then-chief executive of the Pakistan Cricket Board sent assurances to his opposite number in New Zealand, Christopher Doig, that the country was safe to tour. The New Zealand Ministry of Foreign Affairs also conducted an investigation and believed the tour was safe. New Zealand had previous called off tours of Sri Lanka in 1986–87, and in 1991–92 five players returned home early, all due to bombings and security concerns.

The touring side warmed up with an engagement against the Pakistan Cricket Board XI over 17, 18 and 19 November at the Quaid-e-Azam Stadium, in Sahiwal. A drawn match, New Zealand were dismissed for 171 largely due to Mohammad Zahid's 6/54, with Bryan Young top scoring with 47 but with six of New Zealand's top eight batsman being dismissed for single figures. The PCB XI managed 193 in response, with wickets shared between Morrison and Simon Doull. New Zealand fared better with 211/7 declared in their second innings, built largely around Young's 73, and the PCB XI reached 41 without loss by the close. The touring side's batting, bar the efforts of Young who was struggling with a painful tooth infection, was criticised by the media as "in strife" during the match due to their collapse of five wickets in eight overs. Some controversy developed over Lahore newspapers publishing speculations that Doull had tampered with the ball. Earle Cooper, managing the touring side, responded with "New Zealand cricketers are not cheats."

Of greater concern was Danny Morrison, considered a "premier" strike bowler for new Zealand. He managed only eight overs during the warm-up match before having to retire. Given the strength of the Pakistan pace attack, Justin Vaughan was considered for opening the batting alongside Young following their respective performances in the warm-up match. Craig Spearman's form also came into question after a poor performance against the PCB XI and given his recent dropping from the domestic one day championship in New Zealand. Spearman was later not included in the squad announced for the first Test, while Young and Vaughan were set to open the innings together. Pakistan, meanwhile, announced the exclusion of experienced batsman Aamir Sohail, and hinted at giving a debut to Zahoor Elahi, then playing well in domestic cricket. They waited, however, until the morning of the Test before confirming.

== Tour match ==
=== First-class: Pakistan Cricket Board XI v New Zealand ===
17–19 November 1996
Scorecard

New Zealand	v	Pakistan Cricket Board XI
171 (69.4 overs); Bryan Young 47; Mohammad Zahid 6/54 (19.3 overs)		193/7d (64 overs); Mahmood Hamid 39 (82); Danny Morrison 2/39 (11 overs)
211/7d (83 overs); Bryan Young 73; Aaqib Javed 3/38 (17 overs)		41/0 (15 overs); Zahoor Elahi 23*

Match drawn
Quaid-e-Azam Stadium, Sahiwal

- New Zealand won the toss and elected to bat.

== Test series ==
=== 1st Test ===
21–25 November 1996
Scorecard

New Zealand	v	Pakistan
155 (57.1 overs); Adam Parore 37 (68); Waqar Younis 4/48 (15 overs)		191 (55.5 overs); Moin Khan 59 (98); Simon Doull 5/46 (16 overs)
311 (85.2 overs); Chris Cairns 93 (89); Mushtaq Ahmed 6/84 (32 overs)		231 (71.1 overs); Mohammad Wasim 109* (165); Dipak Patel 4/36 (15.1 overs)

New Zealand won by 44 runs
Gaddafi Stadium, Lahore
Umpires: Shakoor Rana (Pak) and Russell Tiffin (Zim)
Player of the match: Simon Doull (NZ)

- New Zealand won the toss and elected to bat.
- Mohammad Wasim and Zahoor Elahi (both Pak) made their Test debuts.

At the Gaddafi Stadium in Lahore, New Zealand and Pakistan met for the first Test on 21 November. Batting first, the touring side were routed for 155 thanks two eight wickets shared equally between Waqar Younis and Mushtaq Ahmed, considered premier bowlers of swing and spin respectively. The media believed there was little in the pitch to explain the sudden loss of wickets, crediting the swing bowling ability of bowlers from both sides. Only wicket-keeper Adam Parore managed to hit runs, top-scoring with 37 batting at number three as a specialist batsman. Pakistan, however, struggled also, making 191 around a knock of 59 from their keeper Moin Khan and contending with a five-wicket haul for Doull. Elahi did make his debut, scoring 22. The batting became easier for New Zealand in their second innings, reaching 311 thanks to 92 from Fleming and 93 from all-rounder Chris Cairns, though Ahmed took six more wickets to give him ten for the match, the second ten-wicket haul of his career. The touring side, setting Pakistan 276 runs to win, managed to restrict them to 231 all out – despite Mohammad Wasim's scoring a century on debut – and took victory by 44 runs. The victory was only the second Test win for New Zealand on Pakistan soil. Doull was praised for his bowling efforts, as were the batting efforts of Fleming and Cairns.

=== 2nd Test ===
28 November–2 December 1996
Scorecard

New Zealand	v	Pakistan
249 (74 overs); Stephen Fleming 67 (109); Mushtaq Ahmed 6/87 (30 overs)		430 (126.4 overs); Saeed Anwar 149 (214); Chris Cairns 5/137 (30.4 overs)
168 (58 overs); Bryan Young 61 (121); Mohammad Zahid 7/66 (20 overs)

Pakistan won by an innings and 13 runs
Rawalpindi Cricket Stadium, Rawalpindi
Umpires: Lloyd Barker (WI) and Javed Akhtar (Pak)
Player of the match: Mohammad Zahid (Pak)

- Pakistan won the toss and elected to field.
- Mohammad Zahid (Pak) made his Test debut.
- Mohammad Zahid is the first Pakistani cricketer to take 10 wickets on Test debut.

One down in the series, Pakistan faced New Zealand at the Rawalpindi Cricket Stadium on 28 November needing victory to square the series. Batting first once more, New Zealand were again undone by Ahmed's 6/86, failing to 249 all out with 67 from Fleming and a career-best 55 from captain and wicket-keeper Lee Germon as the main contributions. Pakistan took control of the game with their second innings thanks to centuries from Anwar and Ijaz Ahmed, and 78 from Saleem Malik. Anwar and Ahmen's partnership was endangering the Pakistan record for the second-wicket before it was broken by Cairns, who took five wickets but for a costly 137 runs as Pakistan reached 430. New Zealand now on the back foot were again routed for 168 thanks to 7/66 from Player of the Match Mohammad Zahid, on his debut. Only Young, with 61, managed to put up resistance. Described as an "emphatic victory" by the Daily Telegraph, Pakistan's win by an innings and 13 runs secured the series as a draw. Zahid, the debutant, received much of the praise.

== ODI series ==
=== 1st ODI ===
4 December 1996
Scorecard

Pakistan; 228/8 (46 overs)	v	New Zealand; 217 (45.4 overs)
Saleem Malik 73* (78); Nathan Astle 2/31 (9 overs)		Bryan Young 58 (95); Saqlain Mushtaq 5/44 (9.4 overs)

Pakistan won by 11 runs
Jinnah Stadium, Gujranwala
Umpires: Javed Akhtar (Pak) and Khizer Hayat (Pak)
Player of the match: Saleem Malik (Pak)

- Pakistan won the toss and elected to bat.
- Match reduced to 46 overs per side due to the rising sun shining in the batsmen's eyes at the start of the match.

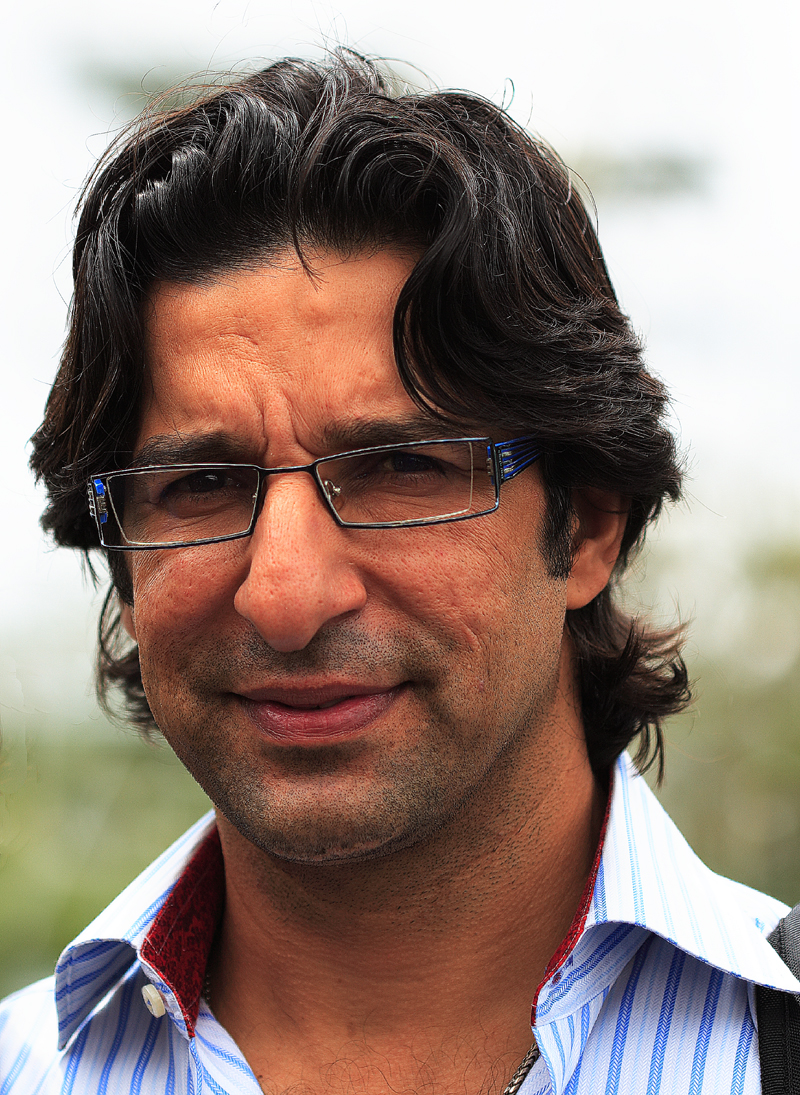
Wasim Akram, who passed 2,000 ODI runs during the 1st One Day International game. He would score 3,717 runs in total alongside the 502 ODI wickets of his career.

The Test series drawn, attention turned to the three-match ODI series. The two teams met at the Jinnah Stadium, Gujranwala, on 4 December, where Pakistan took victory by 11 runs. Batting first in a reduced 46-over game, the start being delayed due to bright sunlight impeding the batsman, they reached 228/8 by the end of their innings thanks in the most part to 73 from 78 balls from Malik. This was part of a 91-run stand with Wasim Akram, who passed 2,000 ODI runs. New Zealand, however, floundered at 217 all out following Saqlain Mushtaq's five-wicket haul defeating the efforts of Young, with 58, Fleming and Cairns with 36 each, and a last-minute 20 from 18 balls from Chris Harris. Waqar Younis was noted by the media for his "unplayable" deliveries during his 2/48.

=== 2nd ODI ===
6 December 1996
Scorecard

Pakistan; 277/9 (47 overs)	v	New Zealand; 231 (42.1 overs)
Saeed Anwar 91 (113); Chris Harris 5/42 (10 overs)		Stephen Fleming 88 (95); Wasim Akram 3/43 (8.1 overs)

Pakistan won by 46 runs
Jinnah Stadium, Sialkot
Umpires: Khizer Hayat (Pak) and Mahboob Shah (Pak)
Player of the match: Saeed Anwar (Pak)

- Pakistan won the toss and elected to bat.
- Match reduced to 47 overs per side because of overnight dew.
- Problems with the official scorers mean that the correct scores may never be known; for example, Stephen Fleming may have scored anywhere between 88 and 92 runs.

The second ODI took place on 6 December at the Jinnah Stadium in Sialkot. Batting first, Pakistan reached 240 for the loss of only two batsmen thanks to Anwar's 91, Zahoor Elahi's 86 and Ijaz Ahmed's 59, before a collapse sparked by Chris Harris's 5/42 reduced them to 277/9. Fleming led the response with 88 from 95 balls, however despite a 37 from Parore they were unable to overhaul the home side's total, falling all out to 231 with wickets shared between Akram, Younuis, Mushtaq and Shahid Afridi. Anwar's batting prowess earned him the Player of the Match award.

=== 3rd ODI ===
8 December
Scorecard

Pakistan; 234/4 (50 overs)	v	New Zealand; 235/3 (45.1 overs)
Ijaz Ahmed 73* (87); Matthew Hart 2/33 (10 overs)		Nathan Astle 60 (69); Wasim Akram 1/36 (8 overs)

New Zealand won by 7 wickets
National Stadium, Karachi
Umpires: Mahboob Shah (Pak) and Shakeel Khan (Pak)
Player of the match: Nathan Astle (NZ)

- Pakistan won the toss and elected to bat.
- Mohammad Wasim and Mohammad Zahid (both Pak) made their ODI debuts.

The third and final game took place on 8 December at the National Stadium, Karachi. Batting first, having already won the series, Pakistan ended their innings on 234/4 composed of a 51 from Zahoor Elahi, 73 from Ijaz Ahmed and captain Wasim Akram's explosive and "magnificent" 66 from 39 balls. New Zealand, undaunted, began a solid chase and reached the target with seven wickets still in hand thanks to 32 from Young, 60 from Astle (the player of the match), 47 from Parore, 48 from Fleming and 25 from Cairns. Astle, under pressure due to poor form during the series, was praised by the media for his half century, 60 from 66 balls.
