= Mohammad Zahid (cricketer) =

Pakistani cricketer

Personal information
- Full name: Mohammad Zahid
- Born: 2 August 1976 (age 50); Gaggu Mandi, Punjab, Pakistan
- Height: 190 cm (6 ft 3 in)
- Batting: Right-handed
- Bowling: Right-arm fast
- Role: Bowler, coach

International information
- National side: Pakistan (1996–2003)
- Test debut (cap 144): 28 November 1996 v New Zealand
- Last Test: 2 January 2003 v South Africa
- ODI debut (cap 115): 8 December 1996 v New Zealand
- Last ODI: 30 November 2002 v Zimbabwe

Career statistics
Competition	Test	ODI
Matches	5	11
Runs scored	7	15
Batting average	1.39	7.50
100s/50s	0/0	0/0
Top score	6*	7*
Balls bowled	792	512
Wickets	15	10
Bowling average	33.46	39.10
5 wickets in innings	1	0
10 wickets in match	1	0
Best bowling	7/66	2/20
Catches/stumpings	0/–	1/–
- Source: ESPNCricinfo, 4 February 2017

Mohammad Zahid (born 2 August 1976) is a Pakistani cricket coach and former cricketer. He was a right-handed batsman and a right-arm fast bowler.

Zahid was the first Pakistani cricketer to take ten wickets on his international debut, taking eleven wickets against New Zealand in 1996.

== Career ==
Having suffered a back injury and subsequently having to go through back surgery halfway through his career, he continued to play until January 2003. Zahid's last Test was against South Africa which saw a record first-wicket partnership by the South Africans of 368 runs, shared between Graeme Smith and Herschelle Gibbs.

He took 11 wickets in his debut Test against New Zealand in 1996, which included figures of 7 for 66 in the second innings. He became the first Pakistani to have taken 10 wickets or more on his debut. Besides this, he bowled an exceptional over to Brian Lara (West Indies), who was then the premier batsman of the world: Lara played and missed the first three deliveries due to the sheer pace that Zahid generated, before edging the fourth ball for a caught behind. This performance caught the eye of the cricketing pundits.

== Fastest bowler debate ==
Mohammad Zahid was noted for his pace from an early age and after his encounter with Brian Lara, Zahid was described by the left-handed batsmen as the fastest bowler in the world. The lack of speed cameras and Zahid's short career span before serious back injury has curtailed much of the initial hype over his pace as many fans, pundits and players wonder what actual speeds were reached by his bowling.

Zahid's career began within short proximity of fellow Pakistani paceman Shoaib Akhtar who later went on to record the fastest ever recorded delivery in cricket in the 2003 World Cup. In a recent interview on a chat show with Rameez Raja, Shoaib Akhtar accepted that Mohammad Zahid was a yard quicker than him when he was bowling in 1997 and after that Shoaib picked up more pace than Zahid, once again fuelling the debate of the speed of Mohammad Zahid and if he may have been one of the fastest bowlers of all time.

== Injury ==
He picked up a back injury in the tour to Sri Lanka and after his back operation could not make his return to the world of cricket. He did come back for a short stint in the series against South Africa in 1998 but had lost his pace considerably and subsequently his line and length, eventually he was dropped from the Pakistan team.

Mohammad Zahid Injury also robbed him a county contract of GBP 60,000 which he signed with Nottinghamshire in 1997 just before his stress fracture.

== Post First-Class career ==
Zahid played club cricket for Sefton Park Cricket Club in Liverpool competing in the Liverpool & District Cricket Competition. In the 2014 season he played for Whiston Cricket Club in the South Yorkshire Cricket league.

Mohammad Zahid was appointed as a bowling coach in Pakistan Cricket Board's High Performance Center at Lahore in August 2020. On 21 February 2021, he resigned from the position for personal reasons.

== See also ==
- List of Pakistan cricketers who have taken five-wicket hauls on Test debut
