= Pairs in Test and first-class cricket =

Batter out without scoring in both innings

A pair in cricket refers to when a batsman is dismissed for a duck (without scoring) in both innings. It is called a 'king pair' if the batsman gets out for a golden duck (getting out on the first ball he faced) in both innings.

The name originates from the two noughts together being thought to resemble a pair of spectacles; the longer form is occasionally used.

== Most pairs in a Test career ==
New Zealand fast bowler Chris Martin has been dismissed without scoring in both innings during seven Test matches, three more than any other player. Five players have been dismissed for four pairs of ducks in Tests. Four are bowlers with no great pretensions towards batsmanship – Bhagwat Chandrasekhar of India, Muttiah Muralitharan of Sri Lanka and West Indians Mervyn Dillon and Courtney Walsh – but the fifth is top order batsman Marvan Atapattu of Sri Lanka. He started his Test career with just one run in six innings – including two pairs – and has bagged two more since.

== Unofficial pairs in Twenty20 cricket ==
In limited overs games decided by a Super Over, it is possible for a batsman to be dismissed for a duck in both the regular innings and the super over. Since runs made in super overs are not counted towards a player's statistical record, this is sometimes referred to an "unofficial pair". On 25 July 2013, Shoaib Malik scored an unofficial golden pair for Pakistan International Airlines against Habib Bank Limited, while on 10 January 2014, Moisés Henriques scored an unofficial pair playing for the Sydney Sixers against the Perth Scorchers. On 20 September 2020, during the second match of the 2020 Indian Premier League, Nicholas Pooran scored an unofficial pair playing for Kings XI Punjab against the Delhi Capitals.
