= List of Cricket World Cup centuries =

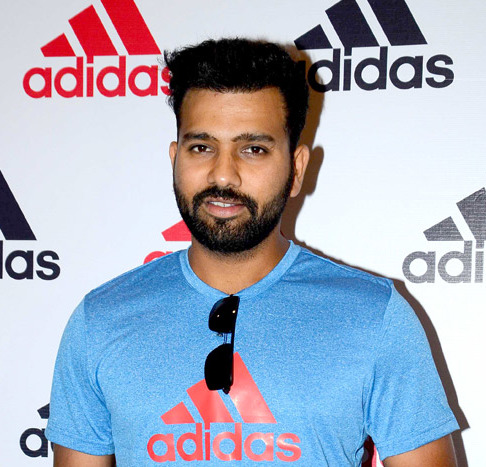
India's Rohit Sharma has the most centuries (7) in World Cup matches. He also holds the record for most centuries in a single World Cup tournament having scored 5 centuries in the 2019 Cricket World Cup.

In cricket, a player is said to have completed a century when he scores 100 or more runs in a single innings. The Cricket World Cup is the international championship of One Day International (ODI) cricket. The event is organized by the sport's governing body, the International Cricket Council (ICC), and is held once every four years. As of the latest 2023 tournament, a total of 236 centuries have been scored by 135 players from 16 different teams. Players from all the teams that have permanent ODI status have made centuries. (Note: The teams are Afghanistan, Australia, Bangladesh, England, India, Ireland, New Zealand, Pakistan, South Africa, Sri Lanka, West Indies and Zimbabwe.) In addition, players from four teams that have temporary ODI status have scored centuries. (Note: The teams are Canada, Netherlands, Scotland and United Arab Emirates.) India have scored the most centuries (39), and have the most centurions (17).

The first century in the championship was scored by Dennis Amiss of England when he made 137 against India in the 1975 World Cup. The same day New Zealand's Glenn Turner scored 171* against East Africa. It remained the highest individual total over the next two editions until Indian cricketer Kapil Dev scored 175* against Zimbabwe in 1983. Following that, the record was broken successively by Viv Richards (181) in 1987, Gary Kirsten (188*) in 1996, Chris Gayle (215) and Martin Guptill (237*) both in 2015.

India's Rohit Sharma holds the record for the highest number of centuries with seven, followed by India's Sachin Tendulkar and Australia's David Warner with six, followed by Australia's Ricky Ponting, Sri Lanka's Kumar Sangakkara and India's Virat Kohli with five. Tillakaratne Dilshan, Sourav Ganguly, Mahela Jayawardene, AB de Villiers, Mark Waugh, and Quinton de Kock have four centuries each.

Rohit Sharma's five centuries in the 2019 tournament are the most by a player in a single tournament. Sangakkara scored four centuries in consecutive matches in the 2015 tournament. Quinton de Kock also scored four centuries in a single tournament (2023). Six players – Waugh (1996), Ganguly (2003), Matthew Hayden (2007), Warner (2019), Rachin Ravindra and Virat Kohli (both 2023) – have scored three centuries in a single tournament. In 1992, Andy Flower of Zimbabwe – making his ODI debut in a World Cup – scored a century. (Note: Flower was the third player to score a century on ODI debut and he is the only batsman to score a century on ODI debut during a World Cup.) In the 2023 tournament, 40 centuries were scored, while the 1979 competition had just two centuries.

Seven centuries have been scored in the finals; out of which six resulted in victories. Adam Gilchrist's 149 against Sri Lanka at the 2007 World Cup Final remains the highest individual score in a final; his 72-ball century is also the fastest in a final.

The fastest 100 in any World Cup was scored by Glenn Maxwell in 40 balls against the Netherlands on 25 October 2023. He also scored the World Cup fastest 200 in the same World Cup against Afghanistan on 7 November.

== Key ==
Symbol	Meaning
Runs	Number of runs scored
*	Batsman remained not out
†	Score was a World Cup record at that time
‡	Scored in a final
Balls	Number of balls faced
4s	Number of fours hit
6s	Number of sixes hit
S/R	Strike rate (Runs scored per 100 balls)
Tied	The match was a tie

== Centuries ==
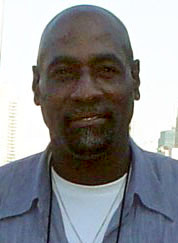
Viv Richards scored a match-winning century in the 1979 World Cup Final.

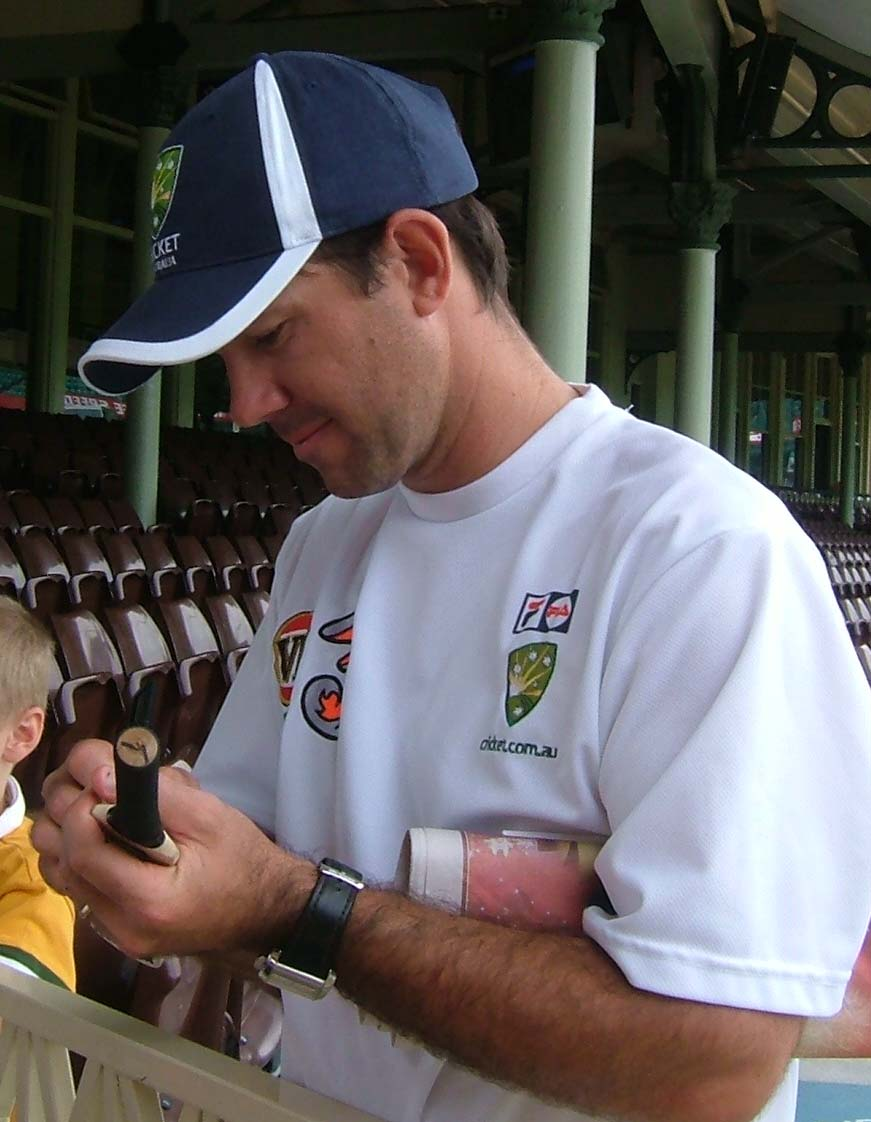
Ricky Ponting scored at least one century in four of the five World Cups he had played.

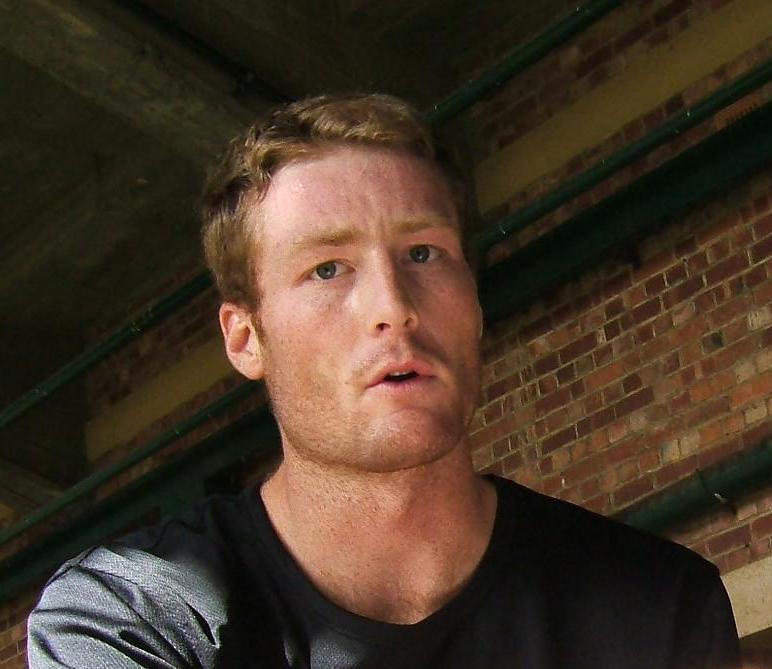
Martin Guptill holds the record for the highest individual score in the tournament's history.

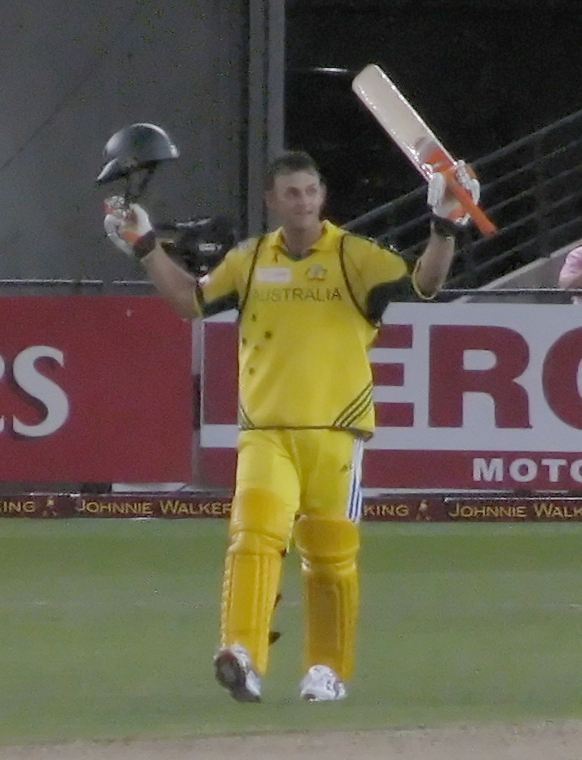
Adam Gilchrist holds the record for the quickest century in a final, and the highest score in a final.

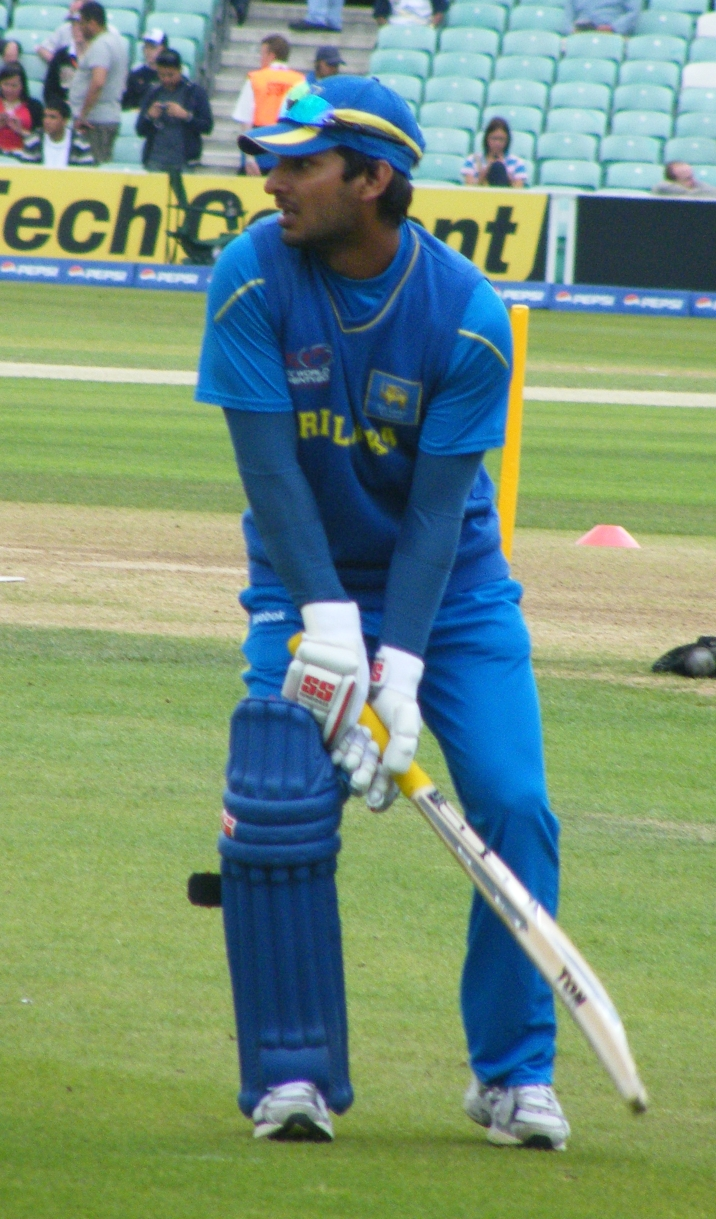
Kumar Sangakkara scored four consecutive centuries, a record in ODIs, in the 2015 tournament.

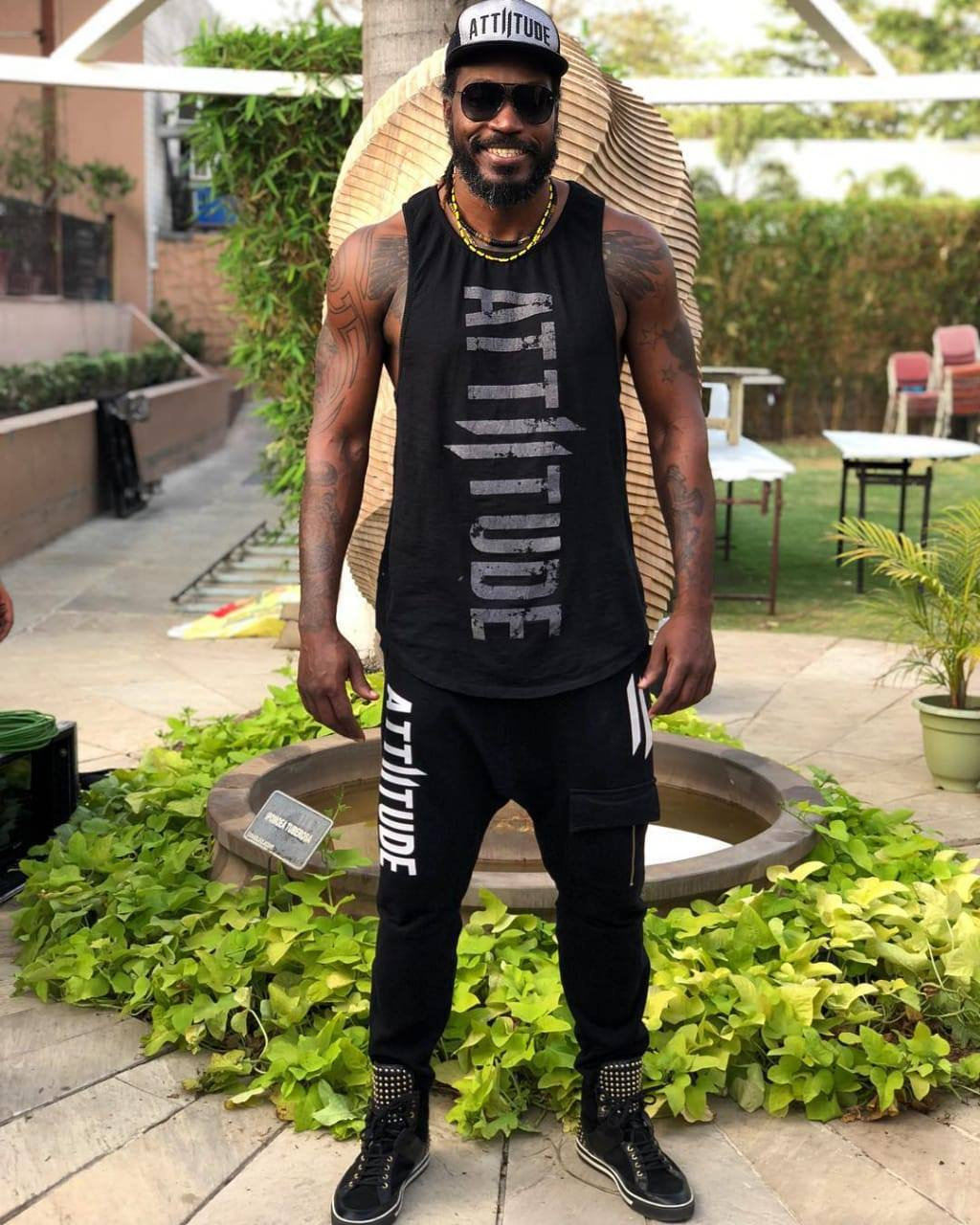
Chris Gayle was the first batsman to score a double century in the World Cup.

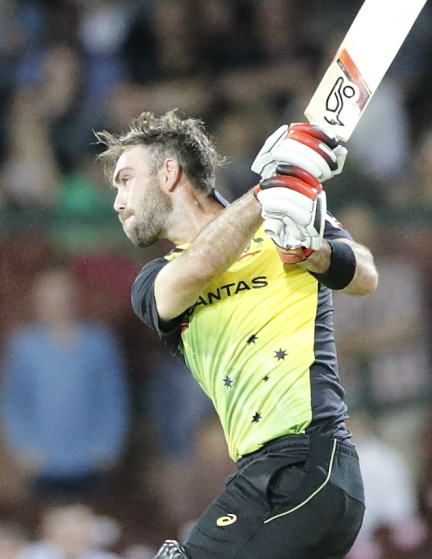
Glenn Maxwell scored the fastest century in the history of the World Cup, in 40 balls against the Netherlands.

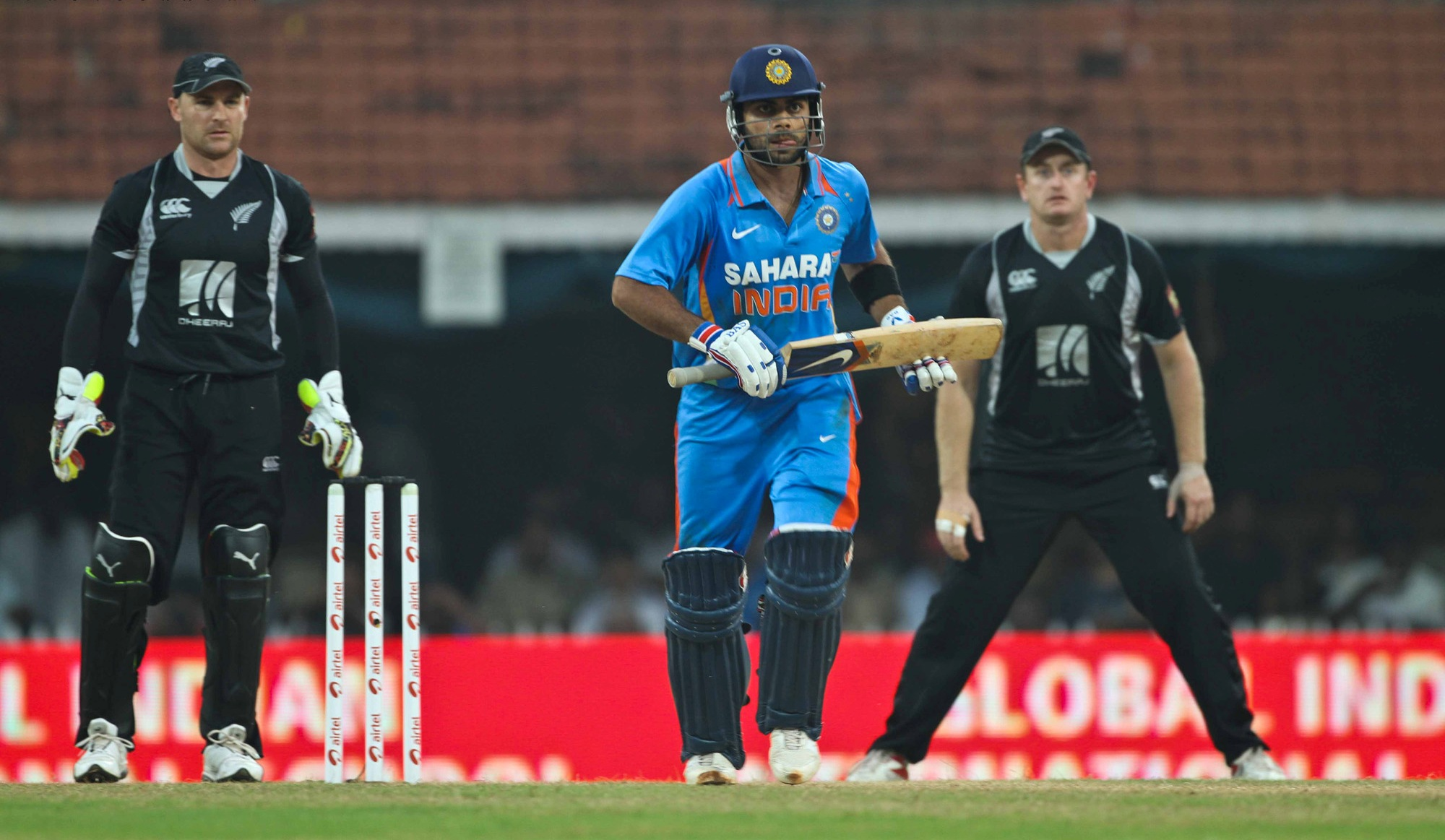
Virat Kohli became the first batter in ODI history to score 50 centuries, going past Sachin's 49 in the semi-final of the 2023 tournament against New Zealand.
- The list is arranged in chronological order. To sort this table by any statistic, click on the icon on the column title.

List of World Cup centuries
No.	Player	Runs	Balls	4s	6s	S/R	Team	Opposition	Venue	Date	Result	Ref
1	Dennis Amiss	137†	147	18	0	93.19	England	India	Lord's, London	7 June 1975	Won	
2	Glenn Turner (1/2)	171*†	201	16	2	85.07	New Zealand	East Africa	Edgbaston Cricket Ground, Birmingham	7 June 1975	Won	
3	Keith Fletcher	131	147	13	0	89.11	England	New Zealand	Trent Bridge, Nottingham	11 June 1975	Won	
4	Alan Turner	101	113	9	1	89.38	Australia	Sri Lanka	The Oval, London	11 June 1975	Won	
5	Glenn Turner (2/2)	114*	177	13	0	64.40	New Zealand	India	Old Trafford Cricket Ground, Manchester	14 June 1975	Won	
6	Clive Lloyd	102‡	85	12	2	120.00	West Indies	Australia	Lord's, London	21 June 1975	Won	
7	Gordon Greenidge (1/2)	106*	173	9	1	61.27	West Indies	India	Edgbaston Cricket Ground, Birmingham	9 June 1979	Won	
8	Viv Richards (1/3)	138*‡	157	11	3	87.89	West Indies	England	Lord's, London	23 June 1979	Won	
9	Allan Lamb	102	105	12	2	97.14	England	New Zealand	The Oval, London	9 June 1983	Won	
10	David Gower	130	120	12	5	108.33	England	Sri Lanka	County Ground, Taunton	11 June 1983	Won	
11	Trevor Chappell	110	131	11	0	83.96	Australia	India	Trent Bridge, Nottingham	13 June 1983	Won	
12	Gordon Greenidge (2/2)	105*	147	5	1	71.42	West Indies	Zimbabwe	New Road, Worcester	13 June 1983	Won	
13	Viv Richards (2/3)	119	146	6	1	81.50	West Indies	India	The Oval, London	15 June 1983	Won	
14	Imran Khan	102*	133	11	0	76.69	Pakistan	Sri Lanka	Headingley Cricket Ground, Leeds	16 June 1983	Won	
15	Kapil Dev	175*†	138	16	6	126.81	India	Zimbabwe	Nevill Ground, Royal Tunbridge Wells	18 June 1983	Won	
16	Zaheer Abbas	103*	121	6	0	85.12	Pakistan	New Zealand	Trent Bridge, Nottingham	20 June 1983	Won	
17	Javed Miandad	103	100	6	0	103.00	Pakistan	Sri Lanka	Niaz Stadium, Hyderabad	8 October 1987	Won	
18	Geoff Marsh (1/2)	110	141	7	1	78.01	Australia	India	M. A. Chidambaram Stadium, Madras (Note: Madras has since been renamed as Chennai.)	9 October 1987	Won	
19	David Houghton	142	137	13	6	103.64	Zimbabwe	New Zealand	Lal Bahadur Shastri Stadium, Hyderabad	10 October 1987	Lost	
20	Desmond Haynes	105	124	10	1	84.67	West Indies	Sri Lanka	National Stadium, Karachi	13 October 1987	Won	
21	Viv Richards (3/3)	181†	125	16	7	144.80	West Indies	Sri Lanka	National Stadium, Karachi	13 October 1987	Won	
22	Rameez Raja (1/3)	113	148	5	0	76.35	Pakistan	England	National Stadium, Karachi	20 October 1987	Won	
23	Saleem Malik	100	95	10	0	105.26	Pakistan	Sri Lanka	Iqbal Stadium, Faisalabad	25 October 1987	Won	
24	Geoff Marsh (2/2)	126*	149	12	3	84.56	Australia	New Zealand	Sector 16 Stadium, Chandigarh	27 October 1987	Won	
25	Richie Richardson	110	135	8	2	81.48	West Indies	Pakistan	National Stadium, Karachi	30 October 1987	Won	
26	Sunil Gavaskar	103*	88	10	3	117.04	India	New Zealand	Vidharba Cricket Association Ground, Nagpur	31 October 1987	Won	
27	Graham Gooch	115	136	11	0	84.55	England	India	Wankhede stadium, Bombay	5 November 1987	Won	
28	Martin Crowe	100*	134	11	0	74.62	New Zealand	Australia	Eden Park, Auckland	22 February 1992	Won	
29	David Boon (1/2)	100	133	11	0	75.18	Australia	New Zealand	Eden Park, Auckland	22 February 1992	Lost	
30	Andy Flower	115*	152	8	1	75.65	Zimbabwe	Sri Lanka	Pukekura Park, New Plymouth	23 February 1992	Lost	
31	Rameez Raja (2/3)	102*	158	4	0	64.55	Pakistan	West Indies	Melbourne Cricket Ground, Melbourne	23 February 1992	Lost	
32	Aamer Sohail (1/2)	114	136	12	0	83.82	Pakistan	Zimbabwe	Bellerive Oval, Hobart	27 February 1992	Won	
33	Phil Simmons	110	125	8	2	88.00	West Indies	Sri Lanka	Berri Oval, Berri	13 March 1992	Won	
34	Rameez Raja (3/3)	119*	155	16	0	76.77	Pakistan	New Zealand	AMI Stadium, Christchurch	18 March 1992	Won	
35	David Boon (2/2)	100	147	8	0	68.02	Australia	West Indies	Melbourne Cricket Ground, Melbourne	18 March 1992	Won	
36	Nathan Astle (1/2)	101	132	8	2	76.51	New Zealand	England	Sardar Patel Stadium, Ahmedabad	14 February 1996	Won	
37	Gary Kirsten	188*†	159	13	4	118.23	South Africa	United Arab Emirates	Rawalpindi Cricket Stadium, Rawalpindi	16 February 1996	Won	
38	Sachin Tendulkar (1/6)	127*	138	15	1	92.02	India	Kenya	Barabati Stadium, Cuttack	18 February 1996	Won	
39	Graeme Hick	104*	133	6	2	78.19	England	Netherlands	Arbab Niaz Stadium, Peshawar	22 February 1996	Won	
40	Mark Waugh (1/4)	130	128	14	1	101.56	Australia	Kenya	Indira Priyadarshini Stadium, Visakhapatnam	23 February 1996	Won	
41	Mark Waugh (2/4)	126	135	8	3	93.33	Australia	India	Wankhede Stadium, Mumbai	27 February 1996	Won	
42	Aamer Sohail (2/2)	111	139	8	0	79.85	Pakistan	South Africa	National Stadium, Karachi	29 February 1996	Lost	
43	Sachin Tendulkar (2/6)	137	137	8	5	100.00	India	Sri Lanka	Feroz Shah Kotla Ground, Delhi	2 March 1996	Lost	
44	Ricky Ponting (1/5)	102	112	5	1	91.07	Australia	West Indies	Sawai Mansingh Stadium, Jaipur	4 March 1996	Lost	
45	Andrew Hudson	161	132	13	4	121.96	South Africa	Netherlands	Rawalpindi Cricket Stadium, Rawalpindi	5 March 1996	Won	
46	Aravinda de Silva (1/2)	145	115	14	5	126.08	Sri Lanka	Kenya	Asgiriya Stadium, Kandy	6 March 1996	Won	
47	Vinod Kambli	106	110	11	0	96.36	India	Zimbabwe	Green Park Stadium, Kanpur	6 March 1996	Won	
48	Brian Lara (1/2)	111	94	16	0	118.08	West Indies	South Africa	National Stadium, Karachi	11 March 1996	Won	
49	Chris Harris	130	124	13	4	104.83	New Zealand	Australia	M. A. Chidambaram Stadium, Madras	11 March 1996	Lost	
50	Mark Waugh (3/4)	110	112	6	2	98.21	Australia	New Zealand	M. A. Chidambaram Stadium, Madras	11 March 1996	Won	
51	Aravinda de Silva (2/2)	107*‡	124	13	0	86.29	Sri Lanka	Australia	Gaddafi Stadium, Lahore	17 March 1996	Won	
52	Rahul Dravid (1/2)	104*	109	10	0	95.41	India	Kenya	County Ground, Bristol	23 May 1999	Won	
53	Sachin Tendulkar (3/6)	140*	101	16	3	138.61	India	Kenya	County Ground, Bristol	23 May 1999	Won	
54	Sourav Ganguly (1/4)	183	158	17	7	115.82	India	Sri Lanka	County Ground, Taunton	26 May 1999	Won	
55	Rahul Dravid (2/2)	145	129	17	1	112.40	India	Sri Lanka	County Ground, Taunton	26 May 1999	Won	
56	Ajay Jadeja	100*	138	7	2	72.46	India	Australia	The Oval, London	4 June 1999	Lost	
57	Mark Waugh (4/4)	104	120	13	0	86.66	Australia	Zimbabwe	Lord's, London	9 June 1999	Won	
58	Neil Johnson	132*	144	14	2	91.66	Zimbabwe	Australia	Lord's, London	9 June 1999	Lost	
59	Saeed Anwar (1/3)	103	144	11	0	71.52	Pakistan	Zimbabwe	The Oval, London	11 June 1999	Won	
60	Herschelle Gibbs (1/2)	101	134	10	1	75.37	South Africa	Australia	Headingley Cricket Ground, Leeds	13 June 1999	Lost	
61	Steve Waugh	120*	110	10	2	109.09	Australia	South Africa	Headingley Cricket Ground, Leeds	13 June 1999	Won	
62	Saeed Anwar (2/3)	113*	148	9	0	76.35	Pakistan	New Zealand	Old Trafford Cricket Ground, Manchester	16 June 1999	Won	
63	Brian Lara (2/2)	116	134	12	2	86.56	West Indies	South Africa	Newlands Cricket Ground, Cape Town	9 February 2003	Won	
64	Craig Wishart	172*	151	18	3	113.90	Zimbabwe	Namibia	Harare Sports Club, Harare	10 February 2003	Won	
65	Sanath Jayasuriya (1/3)	120	125	14	0	96.00	Sri Lanka	New Zealand	Chevrolet Park, Bloemfontein	10 February 2003	Won	
66	Scott Styris (1/2)	141	125	3	6	112.80	New Zealand	Sri Lanka	Chevrolet Park, Bloemfontein	10 February 2003	Lost	
67	Andrew Symonds	143*	125	18	2	114.40	Australia	Pakistan	Wanderers Stadium, Johannesburg	11 February 2003	Won	
68	Herschelle Gibbs (2/2)	143	141	19	3	101.41	South Africa	New Zealand	Wanderers Stadium, Johannesburg	16 February 2003	Lost	
69	Stephen Fleming (1/2)	134*	132	21	0	101.51	New Zealand	South Africa	Wanderers Stadium, Johannesburg	16 February 2003	Won	
70	John Davison	111	76	8	6	146.05	Canada	West Indies	SuperSport Park, Centurion	23 February 2003	Lost	
71	Sachin Tendulkar (4/6)	152	151	18	0	100.66	India	Namibia	City Oval, Pietermaritzburg	23 February 2003	Won	
72	Sourav Ganguly (2/4)	112*	119	6	4	94.11	India	Namibia	City Oval, Pietermaritzburg	23 February 2003	Won	
73	Saeed Anwar (3/3)	101	126	7	0	80.15	Pakistan	India	SuperSport Park, Centurion	1 March 2003	Lost	
74	Feiko Kloppenburg	121	142	6	4	85.21	Netherlands	Namibia	Chevrolet Park, Bloemfontein	3 March 2003	Won	
75	Klaas-Jan van Noortwijk	134*	129	11	3	103.87	Netherlands	Namibia	Chevrolet Park, Bloemfontein	3 March 2003	Won	
76	Marvan Atapattu (1/2)	124	129	18	0	96.12	Sri Lanka	South Africa	Kingsmead Cricket Ground, Durban	3 March 2003	Tied	
77	Chris Gayle (1/2)	119	151	8	2	78.80	West Indies	Kenya	De Beers Diamond Oval, Kimberley	4 March 2003	Won	
78	Ricky Ponting (2/5)	114	109	8	4	104.58	Australia	Sri Lanka	SuperSport Park, Centurion	7 March 2003	Won	
79	Sourav Ganguly (3/4)	107*	120	11	2	89.16	India	Kenya	Newlands Cricket Ground, Cape Town	7 March 2003	Won	
80	Nathan Astle (2/2)	102*	122	11	0	83.60	New Zealand	Zimbabwe	Chevrolet Park, Bloemfontein	8 March 2003	Won	
81	Marvan Atapattu (2/2)	103*	127	7	0	81.10	Sri Lanka	Zimbabwe	Buffalo Park, East London	15 March 2003	Won	
82	Sourav Ganguly (4/4)	111*	114	5	5	97.36	India	Kenya	Kingsmead Cricket Ground, Durban	20 March 2003	Won	
83	Ricky Ponting (3/5)	140*‡	121	4	8	115.70	Australia	India	Wanderers Stadium, Johannesburg	23 March 2003	Won	
84	Ricky Ponting (4/5)	113	93	9	5	121.50	Australia	Scotland	Warner Park Sporting Complex, Basseterre	14 March 2007	Won	
85	Jeremy Bray	115*	137	10	2	83.94	Ireland	Zimbabwe	Sabina Park, Kingston	15 March 2007	Tied	
86	Jacques Kallis	128*	109	11	5	117.43	South Africa	Netherlands	Warner Park Sporting Complex, Basseterre	16 March 2007	Won	
87	Brad Hodge	123	89	8	7	138.20	Australia	Netherlands	Warner Park Sporting Complex, Basseterre	18 March 2007	Won	
88	Virender Sehwag (1/2)	114	87	17	3	131.03	India	Bermuda	Queens Park Oval, Port of Spain	19 March 2007	Won	
89	Sanath Jayasuriya (2/3)	109	87	7	7	125.28	Sri Lanka	Bangladesh	Queens Park Oval, Port of Spain	21 March 2007	Won	
90	Imran Nazir	160	121	14	8	132.23	Pakistan	Zimbabwe	Sabina Park, Kingston	21 March 2007	Won	
91	Lou Vincent	101	117	9	1	86.32	New Zealand	Canada	Beausejour Stadium, Gros Islet	22 March 2007	Won	
92	Shivnarine Chanderpaul	102*	113	10	4	90.26	West Indies	Ireland	Sabina Park, Kingston	23 March 2007	Won	
93	Matthew Hayden (1/3)	101	68	14	4	148.52	Australia	South Africa	Warner Park Sporting Complex, Basseterre	24 March 2007	Won	
94	Matthew Hayden (2/3)	158	143	14	4	110.48	Australia	West Indies	Sir Vivian Richards Stadium, North Sound	27 March 2007	Won	
95	Sanath Jayasuriya (3/3)	115	101	10	4	113.86	Sri Lanka	West Indies	Providence Stadium, Providence	1 April 2007	Won	
96	Stephen Fleming (2/2)	102*	92	10	3	110.86	New Zealand	Bangladesh	Sir Vivian Richards Stadium, North Sound	2 April 2007	Won	
97	Kevin Pietersen (1/2)	104	122	6	1	85.24	England	Australia	Sir Vivian Richards Stadium, North Sound	8 April 2007	Lost	
98	AB de Villiers (1/4)	146	130	12	5	112.30	South Africa	West Indies	National Cricket Stadium, St. George's	10 April 2007	Won	
99	Scott Styris (2/2)	111*	157	8	0	70.70	New Zealand	Sri Lanka	National Cricket Stadium, St. George's	12 April 2007	Lost	
100	Matthew Hayden (3/3)	103	100	10	2	103.00	Australia	New Zealand	National Cricket Stadium, St. George's	20 April 2007	Won	
101	Kevin Pietersen (2/2)	100	91	10	1	109.89	England	West Indies	Kensington Oval, Bridgetown	21 April 2007	Won	
102	Mahela Jayawardene (1/4)	115*	109	10	3	105.50	Sri Lanka	New Zealand	Sabina Park, Kingston	24 April 2007	Won	
103	Adam Gilchrist	149‡	104	13	8	143.26	Australia	Sri Lanka	Kensington Oval, Bridgetown	28 April 2007	Won	
104	Virender Sehwag (2/2)	175	140	14	5	125.00	India	Bangladesh	Sher-e-Bangla Cricket Stadium, Dhaka	19 February 2011	Won	
105	Virat Kohli (1/5)	100*	83	8	2	120.48	India	Bangladesh	Sher-e-Bangla Cricket Stadium, Dhaka	19 February 2011	Won	
106	Mahela Jayawardene (2/4)	100	81	9	1	123.45	Sri Lanka	Canada	Hambantota Cricket Stadium, Hambantota	20 February 2011	Won	
107	Ryan ten Doeschate (1/2)	119	110	9	3	108.18	Netherlands	England	Vidarbha Cricket Association Stadium, Nagpur	22 February 2011	Lost	
108	AB de Villiers (2/4)	107*	105	8	2	101.90	South Africa	West Indies	Feroz Shah Kotla Ground, Delhi	24 February 2011	Won	
109	Sachin Tendulkar (5/6)	120	115	10	5	104.34	India	England	Chinnaswamy Stadium, Bangalore	27 February 2011	Tied	
110	Andrew Strauss	158	145	18	1	108.96	England	India	Chinnaswamy Stadium, Bangalore	27 February 2011	Tied	
111	Kevin O'Brien	113	63	13	6	179.37	Ireland	England	Chinnaswamy Stadium, Bangalore	2 March 2011	Won	
112	Hashim Amla (1/2)	113	130	8	0	86.92	South Africa	Netherlands	Punjab Cricket Association Stadium, Mohali	3 March 2011	Won	
113	AB de Villiers (3/4)	134	98	13	4	136.73	South Africa	Netherlands	Punjab Cricket Association Stadium, Mohali	3 March 2011	Won	
114	Ross Taylor	131*	124	8	7	105.64	New Zealand	Pakistan	Pallekele International Cricket Stadium, Kandy	8 March 2011	Won	
115	Upul Tharanga (1/2)	133	141	17	0	94.32	Sri Lanka	Zimbabwe	Pallekele International Cricket Stadium, Kandy	10 March 2011	Won	
116	Tillakaratne Dilshan (1/4)	144	131	16	1	109.92	Sri Lanka	Zimbabwe	Pallekele International Cricket Stadium, Kandy	10 March 2011	Won	
117	Devon Smith	107	133	11	1	80.45	West Indies	Ireland	Punjab Cricket Association Stadium, Mohali	11 March 2011	Won	
118	Sachin Tendulkar (6/6)	111	101	8	3	109.90	India	South Africa	Vidarbha Cricket Association Stadium, Nagpur	12 March 2011	Lost	
119	Brendon McCullum	101	109	12	2	92.66	New Zealand	Canada	Wankhede Stadium, Mumbai	13 March 2011	Won	
120	Ryan ten Doeschate (2/2)	106	108	13	1	98.14	Netherlands	Ireland	Eden Gardens, Kolkata	18 March 2011	Lost	
121	Paul Stirling	101	72	14	2	140.27	Ireland	Netherlands	Eden Gardens, Kolkata	18 March 2011	Won	
122	Kumar Sangakkara (1/5)	111	128	12	2	86.71	Sri Lanka	New Zealand	Wankhede Stadium, Mumbai	18 March 2011	Won	
123	Yuvraj Singh	113	123	10	2	91.86	India	West Indies	M. A. Chidambaram Stadium, Chennai	20 March 2011	Won	
124	Ricky Ponting (5/5)	104	118	7	1	88.13	Australia	India	Sardar Patel Stadium, Ahmedabad	24 March 2011	Lost	
125	Tillakaratne Dilshan (2/4)	108*	115	10	2	93.91	Sri Lanka	England	Premadasa Stadium, Colombo	26 March 2011	Won	
126	Upul Tharanga (2/2)	102*	122	12	1	83.60	Sri Lanka	England	Premadasa Stadium, Colombo	26 March 2011	Won	
127	Mahela Jayawardene (3/4)	103*‡	88	13	0	117.04	Sri Lanka	India	Wankhede Stadium, Mumbai	2 April 2011	Lost	
128	Aaron Finch (1/3)	135	128	12	3	105.46	Australia	England	Melbourne Cricket Ground, Melbourne	14 February 2015	Won	
129	David Miller (1/2)	138*	92	7	9	150.00	South Africa	Zimbabwe	Seddon Park, Hamilton	15 February 2015	Won	
130	JP Duminy	115*	100	9	3	115.00	South Africa	Zimbabwe	Seddon Park, Hamilton	15 February 2015	Won	
131	Virat Kohli (2/5)	107	126	8	0	84.92	India	Pakistan	Adelaide Oval, Adelaide	15 February 2015	Won	
132	Lendl Simmons	102	84	9	5	121.42	West Indies	Ireland	Saxton Oval, Nelson	16 February 2015	Lost	
133	Mahela Jayawardene (4/4)	100	120	8	1	83.33	Sri Lanka	Afghanistan	University Oval, Dunedin	22 February 2015	Won	
134	Shikhar Dhawan (1/3)	137	146	16	2	93.80	India	South Africa	Melbourne Cricket Ground, Melbourne	22 February 2015	Won	
135	Moeen Ali	128	107	12	5	119.62	England	Scotland	Hagley Oval, Christchurch	23 February 2015	Won	
136	Chris Gayle (2/2)	215†	147	10	16	146.26	West Indies	Zimbabwe	Manuka Oval, Canberra	24 February 2015	Won	
137	Marlon Samuels	133*	156	11	3	85.26	West Indies	Zimbabwe	Manuka Oval, Canberra	24 February 2015	Won	
138	Shaiman Anwar	106	83	10	1	127.71	United Arab Emirates	Ireland	The Gabba, Brisbane	25 February 2015	Lost	
139	Tillakaratne Dilshan (3/4)	161*	146	22	0	110.27	Sri Lanka	Bangladesh	Melbourne Cricket Ground, Melbourne	26 February 2015	Won	
140	Kumar Sangakkara (2/5)	105*	76	13	1	138.15	Sri Lanka	Bangladesh	Melbourne Cricket Ground, Melbourne	26 February 2015	Won	
141	AB de Villiers (4/4)	162*	66	17	8	245.45	South Africa	West Indies	Sydney Cricket Ground, Sydney	27 February 2015	Won	
142	Joe Root (1/3)	121	108	14	2	112.03	England	Sri Lanka	Wellington Regional Stadium, Wellington	1 March 2015	Lost	
143	Lahiru Thirimanne	139*	143	13	2	97.20	Sri Lanka	England	Wellington Regional Stadium, Wellington	1 March 2015	Won	
144	Kumar Sangakkara (3/5)	117*	86	11	2	136.04	Sri Lanka	England	Wellington Regional Stadium, Wellington	1 March 2015	Won	
145	Hashim Amla (2/2)	159	128	16	4	124.21	South Africa	Ireland	Manuka Oval, Canberra	3 March 2015	Won	
146	Faf du Plessis (1/2)	109	109	10	1	100.00	South Africa	Ireland	Manuka Oval, Canberra	3 March 2015	Won	
147	David Warner (1/6)	178	133	19	5	133.83	Australia	Afghanistan	WACA Ground, Perth	4 March 2015	Won	
148	Kyle Coetzer	156	134	17	4	116.41	Scotland	Bangladesh	Saxton Oval, Nelson	5 March 2015	Lost	
149	Ed Joyce	112	103	9	3	108.73	Ireland	Zimbabwe	Bellerive Oval, Hobart	7 March 2015	Won	
150	Brendan Taylor (1/2)	121	91	11	4	132.96	Zimbabwe	Ireland	Bellerive Oval, Hobart	7 March 2015	Lost	
151	Glenn Maxwell (1/3)	102	53	10	4	192.45	Australia	Sri Lanka	Sydney Cricket Ground, Sydney	8 March 2015	Won	
152	Kumar Sangakkara (4/5)	104	107	11	0	97.19	Sri Lanka	Australia	Sydney Cricket Ground, Sydney	8 March 2015	Lost	
153	Mohammad Mahmudullah (1/3)	103	138	7	2	74.63	Bangladesh	England	Adelaide Oval, Adelaide	9 March 2015	Won	
154	Shikhar Dhawan (2/3)	100	85	11	5	117.64	India	Ireland	Seddon Park, Hamilton	10 March 2015	Won	
155	Tillakaratne Dilshan (4/4)	104	99	10	1	105.05	Sri Lanka	Scotland	Bellerive Oval, Hobart	11 March 2015	Won	
156	Kumar Sangakkara (5/5)	124	95	13	4	130.52	Sri Lanka	Scotland	Bellerive Oval, Hobart	11 March 2015	Won	
157	Mohammad Mahmudullah (2/3)	128*	123	12	3	104.06	Bangladesh	New Zealand	Seddon Park, Hamilton	13 March 2015	Lost	
158	Martin Guptill (1/2)	105	100	11	2	105.00	New Zealand	Bangladesh	Seddon Park, Hamilton	13 March 2015	Won	
159	Brendan Taylor (2/2)	138	110	15	5	125.45	Zimbabwe	India	Eden Park, Auckland	14 March 2015	Lost	
160	Suresh Raina	110*	104	9	4	105.76	India	Zimbabwe	Eden Park, Auckland	14 March 2015	Won	
161	William Porterfield	107	131	11	1	81.67	Ireland	Pakistan	Adelaide Oval, Adelaide	15 March 2015	Lost	
162	Sarfraz Ahmed	101*	124	6	0	81.45	Pakistan	Ireland	Adelaide Oval, Adelaide	15 March 2015	Won	
163	Rohit Sharma (1/7)	137	126	14	3	108.73	India	Bangladesh	Melbourne Cricket Ground, Melbourne	19 March 2015	Won	
164	Martin Guptill (2/2)	237*†	163	24	11	145.39	New Zealand	West Indies	Wellington Regional Stadium, Wellington	21 March 2015	Won	
165	Steve Smith	105	93	11	2	112.90	Australia	India	Sydney Cricket Ground, Sydney	26 March 2015	Won	
166	Joe Root (2/3)	107	104	10	1	102.88	England	Pakistan	Trent Bridge, Nottingham	3 June 2019	Lost	
167	Jos Buttler	103	76	9	2	135.52	England	Pakistan	Trent Bridge, Nottingham	3 June 2019	Lost	
168	Rohit Sharma (2/7)	122*	144	13	2	84.72	India	South Africa	Hampshire Bowl, Southampton	5 June 2019	Won	
169	Jason Roy	153	121	14	4	126.44	England	Bangladesh	Sophia Gardens, Cardiff	8 June 2019	Won	
170	Shakib Al Hasan (1/2)	121	119	12	1	101.68	Bangladesh	England	Sophia Gardens, Cardiff	8 June 2019	Lost	
171	Shikhar Dhawan (3/3)	117	109	16	0	107.33	India	Australia	The Oval, London	9 June 2019	Won	
172	David Warner (2/6)	107	111	11	1	96.39	Australia	Pakistan	County Ground, Taunton	12 June 2019	Won	
173	Joe Root (3/3)	100*	94	11	0	106.38	England	West Indies	Hampshire Bowl, Southampton	14 June 2019	Won	
174	Aaron Finch (2/3)	153	132	15	5	115.90	Australia	Sri Lanka	The Oval, London	15 June 2019	Won	
175	Rohit Sharma (3/7)	140	113	14	3	123.89	India	Pakistan	Old Trafford Cricket Ground, Manchester	16 June 2019	Won	
176	Shakib Al Hasan (2/2)	124*	99	16	0	125.25	Bangladesh	West Indies	County Ground, Taunton	17 June 2019	Won	
177	Eoin Morgan	148	71	4	17	208.45	England	Afghanistan	Old Trafford Cricket Ground, Manchester	18 June 2019	Won	
178	Kane Williamson (1/2)	106*	138	9	1	76.81	New Zealand	South Africa	Edgbaston Cricket Ground, Birmingham	19 June 2019	Won	
179	David Warner (3/6)	166	147	14	5	112.92	Australia	Bangladesh	Trent Bridge, Nottingham	20 June 2019	Won	
180	Mushfiqur Rahim	102*	97	9	1	105.15	Bangladesh	Australia	Trent Bridge, Nottingham	20 June 2019	Lost	
181	Kane Williamson (2/2)	148	154	14	1	96.10	New Zealand	West Indies	Old Trafford Cricket Ground, Manchester	22 June 2019	Won	
182	Carlos Brathwaite	101	82	9	5	123.17	West Indies	New Zealand	Old Trafford Cricket Ground, Manchester	22 June 2019	Lost	
183	Aaron Finch (3/3)	100	116	11	2	86.20	Australia	England	Lord's, London	25 June 2019	Won	
184	Babar Azam	101*	127	11	0	79.52	Pakistan	New Zealand	Edgbaston Cricket Ground, Birmingham	26 June 2019	Won	
185	Jonny Bairstow (1/2)	111	109	10	6	101.83	England	India	Edgbaston Cricket Ground, Birmingham	30 June 2019	Won	
186	Rohit Sharma (4/7)	102	108	15	0	93.57	India	England	Edgbaston Cricket Ground, Birmingham	30 June 2019	Lost	
187	Avishka Fernando	104	103	9	2	100.97	Sri Lanka	West Indies	Riverside Ground, Chester-le-Street	1 July 2019	Won	
188	Nicholas Pooran	118	103	11	4	114.56	West Indies	Sri Lanka	Riverside Ground, Chester-le-Street	1 July 2019	Lost	
189	Rohit Sharma (5/7)	104	92	7	5	113.04	India	Bangladesh	Edgbaston Cricket Ground, Birmingham	2 July 2019	Won	
190	Jonny Bairstow (2/2)	106	99	15	1	107.07	England	New Zealand	Riverside Ground, Chester-le-Street	3 July 2019	Won	
191	Imam-ul-Haq	100	100	7	0	100.00	Pakistan	Bangladesh	Lord's, London	5 July 2019	Won	
192	Angelo Mathews	113	128	10	2	88.28	Sri Lanka	India	Headingley Cricket Ground, Leeds	6 July 2019	Lost	
193	Rohit Sharma (6/7)	103	94	14	2	109.57	India	Sri Lanka	Headingley Cricket Ground, Leeds	6 July 2019	Won	
194	KL Rahul (1/2)	111	118	11	1	94.06	India	Sri Lanka	Headingley Cricket Ground, Leeds	6 July 2019	Won	
195	Faf du Plessis (2/2)	100	94	7	2	106.38	South Africa	Australia	Old Trafford Cricket Ground, Manchester	6 July 2019	Won	
196	David Warner (4/6)	122	117	15	2	104.27	Australia	South Africa	Old Trafford Cricket Ground, Manchester	6 July 2019	Lost	
197	Devon Conway	152*	121	19	3	125.61	New Zealand	England	Narendra Modi Stadium, Ahmedabad	5 October 2023	Won	
198	Rachin Ravindra (1/3)	123*	96	11	5	128.12	New Zealand	England	Narendra Modi Stadium, Ahmedabad	5 October 2023	Won	
199	Quinton de Kock (1/4)	100	84	12	3	119.04	South Africa	Sri Lanka	Arun Jaitley Cricket Stadium, Delhi	7 October 2023	Won	
200	Rassie van der Dussen (1/2)	108	110	13	2	98.18	South Africa	Sri Lanka	Arun Jaitley Cricket Stadium, Delhi	7 October 2023	Won	
201	Aiden Markram	106	54	14	3	196.30	South Africa	Sri Lanka	Arun Jaitley Cricket Stadium, Delhi	7 October 2023	Won	
202	Dawid Malan	140	107	16	5	130.84	England	Bangladesh	HPCA Stadium, Dharamshala	10 October 2023	Won	
203	Kusal Mendis	122	77	14	6	158.44	Sri Lanka	Pakistan	Rajiv Gandhi International Stadium, Hyderabad	10 October 2023	Lost	
204	Sadeera Samarawickrama	108	89	11	2	121.34	Sri Lanka	Pakistan	Rajiv Gandhi International Stadium, Hyderabad	10 October 2023	Lost	
205	Abdullah Shafique	113	103	10	3	109.70	Pakistan	Sri Lanka	Rajiv Gandhi International Stadium, Hyderabad	10 October 2023	Won	
206	Mohammad Rizwan	131	121	13	3	108.26	Pakistan	Sri Lanka	Rajiv Gandhi International Stadium, Hyderabad	10 October 2023	Won	
207	Rohit Sharma (7/7)	131	84	16	5	155.95	India	Afghanistan	Arun Jaitley Cricket Stadium, Delhi	11 October 2023	Won	
208	Quinton de Kock (2/4)	109	106	8	5	102.83	South Africa	Australia	Ekana Cricket Stadium, Lucknow	12 October 2023	Won	
209	Virat Kohli (3/5)	103*	97	6	4	106.18	India	Bangladesh	Maharashtra Cricket Association Stadium, Pune	19 October 2023	Won	
210	David Warner (5/6)	163	124	14	9	131.45	Australia	Pakistan	M. Chinnaswamy Stadium, Bengaluru	20 October 2023	Won	
211	Mitchell Marsh (1/2)	121	108	10	9	112.03	Australia	Pakistan	M. Chinnaswamy Stadium, Bengaluru	20 October 2023	Won	
212	Heinrich Klaasen	109	67	12	4	162.69	South Africa	England	Wankhede Stadium, Mumbai	21 October 2023	Won	
213	Daryl Mitchell (1/2)	130	127	9	5	102.36	New Zealand	India	HPCA Stadium, Dharamshala	22 October 2023	Lost	
214	Quinton de Kock (3/4)	174	140	15	7	124.28	South Africa	Bangladesh	Wankhede Stadium, Mumbai	24 October 2023	Won	
215	Mohammad Mahmudullah (3/3)	111	111	11	4	100.00	Bangladesh	South Africa	Wankhede Stadium, Mumbai	24 October 2023	Lost	
216	David Warner (6/6)	104	93	11	3	111.82	Australia	Netherlands	Arun Jaitley Stadium, Delhi	25 October 2023	Won	
217	Glenn Maxwell (2/3)	106	44	9	8	240.90	Australia	Netherlands	Arun Jaitley Stadium, Delhi	25 October 2023	Won	
218	Travis Head (1/2)	109	67	10	7	162.68	Australia	New Zealand	HPCA Stadium, Dharamshala	28 October 2023	Won	
219	Rachin Ravindra (2/3)	116	89	9	5	130.34	New Zealand	Australia	HPCA Stadium, Dharamshala	28 October 2023	Lost	
220	Quinton de Kock (4/4)	114	116	10	3	98.28	South Africa	New Zealand	Maharashtra Cricket Association Stadium, Pune	1 November 2023	Won	
221	Rassie van der Dussen (2/2)	133	118	9	5	112.71	South Africa	New Zealand	Maharashtra Cricket Association Stadium, Pune	1 November 2023	Won	
222	Rachin Ravindra (3/3)	108	94	15	1	114.89	New Zealand	Pakistan	M. Chinnaswamy Stadium, Bangalore	4 November 2023	Lost	
223	Fakhar Zaman	126*	81	8	11	155.56	Pakistan	New Zealand	M. Chinnaswamy Stadium, Bangalore	4 November 2023	Won	
224	Virat Kohli (4/5)	101*	121	10	0	83.47	India	South Africa	Eden Gardens, Kolkata	5 November 2023	Won	
225	Charith Asalanka	108	105	6	5	102.86	Sri Lanka	Bangladesh	Arun Jaitley Stadium, Delhi	6 November 2023	Lost	
226	Ibrahim Zadran	129*	143	8	3	90.20	Afghanistan	Australia	Wankhede Stadium, Mumbai	7 November 2023	Lost	
227	Glenn Maxwell (3/3)	201*	128	21	10	157.03	Australia	Afghanistan	Wankhede Stadium, Mumbai	7 November 2023	Won	
228	Ben Stokes	108	84	6	6	128.57	England	Netherlands	Maharashtra Cricket Association Stadium, Pune	8 November 2023	Won	
229	Mitchell Marsh (2/2)	177*	132	17	9	134.09	Australia	Bangladesh	Maharashtra Cricket Association Stadium, Pune	11 November 2023	Won	
230	Shreyas Iyer (1/2)	128*	94	10	5	136.17	India	Netherlands	M Chinnaswamy Stadium, Bengaluru	12 November 2023	Won	
231	KL Rahul (2/2)	102	64	11	4	159.37	India	Netherlands	M Chinnaswamy Stadium, Bengaluru	12 November 2023	Won	
232	Virat Kohli (5/5)	117	113	9	2	103.53	India	New Zealand	Wankhede Stadium, Mumbai	15 November 2023	Won	
233	Shreyas Iyer (2/2)	105	70	4	8	150.00	India	New Zealand	Wankhede Stadium, Mumbai	15 November 2023	Won	
234	Daryl Mitchell (2/2)	134	119	9	7	112.60	New Zealand	India	Wankhede Stadium, Mumbai	15 November 2023	Lost	
235	David Miller (2/2)	101	116	8	5	87.06	South Africa	Australia	Eden Gardens, Kolkata	16 November 2023	Lost	
236	Travis Head (2/2)	137‡	120	15	4	114.16	Australia	India	Narendra Modi Stadium, Ahmedabad	19 November 2023	Won	

== Bibliography ==
- Bhardwaj (2011). Study Package For Clat 2nd Edition. McGraw-Hill Education (India) Pvt Limited. ISBN 978-0-07-107468-1.
- Knight, Julian (2013). Cricket For Dummies. John Wiley & Sons. ISBN 978-1-118-48034-2.
- Pervez, M.A. (2001). A Dictionary of Cricket. Universities Press. ISBN 978-81-7370-184-9.
