= Pakistani cricket team in South Africa in 1997–98 =

International cricket tour

Pakistan in South Africa 1997-98
| | South Africa | Pakistan |
- Dates: 29 January 1998 – 10 March 1998
| Captains | Gary Kirsten (1st Test); Hansie Cronje (2nd and 3rd Tests) | Aamer Sohail (1st and 2nd Tests); Rashid Latif (3rd Test) |

Test series
- Result: 3-match series drawn 1–1
| Most runs | Mark Boucher (188) | Azhar Mahmood (327) |
| Most wickets | Allan Donald (16) | Waqar Younis (16) |
- Player of the series: Azhar Mahmood (PAK)

The Pakistan national cricket team toured South Africa during the 1997–98 season, playing three Tests from 14 February to 10 March 1998.

Pakistan was led by Rashid Latif while South Africa was led by Hansie Cronje. The tour began with a Test series consisting of three matches. Both captains had to withdraw from part of the Test series with injury.

The series was drawn 1–1. At the end of the series, Azhar Mahmood of Pakistan emerged as the top run-scorer with 327 runs, with an average of 65.40; Saeed Anwar followed close behind with 236 runs. Waqar Younis and Allan Donald finished the series as top wicket-takers capturing 16 wickets respectively, with Mushtaq Ahmed taking 13. Azhar Mahmood was named "man of the series".

The Pakistan tour was followed by a tour of Zimbabwe, followed by a triangular One-Day tournament played in South Africa, which included Sri Lanka as the third team. Pakistan and South Africa qualified for the final from the group stage. Pakistan were defeated in the Final by South Africa.

== Squad ==
Pakistan
- Rashid Latif (c, wk)
- Aamer Sohail (vc)
- Saeed Anwar
- Inzamam-ul-Haq
- Ijaz Ahmed
- Yousuf Youhana
- Moin Khan (wk)
- Mohammad Wasim
- Saqlain Mushtaq
- Azhar Mahmood
- Ali Naqvi
- Shoaib Akhtar
- Mohammad Akram
- Waqar Younis
- Mushtaq Ahmed

Fazl-e-Akbar, Mohammad Hussain, Shahid Afridi and Wasim Akram later reinforced the party.

== Tour matches ==
=== Nicky Oppenheimer XI v Pakistanis ===
29 January 1998
Scorecard

| Pakistanis; 299/4d (56 overs) | v | Nicky Oppenheimer XI; 239/6 (42 overs) |
| Inzamam-ul-Haq 107 (88); NC Johnson 2/32 (9 overs) | | DM Benkenstein 94 (69); Azhar Mahmood 3/82 (12 overs) |

Match drawn
NF Oppenheimer Ground, Randjesfontein
Umpires: K Lavery and S Wadvalla
Player of the match: Inzamam-ul-Haq (PAK)

This match did not have List A status.

=== Four-day: Griqualand West v Pakistanis ===
30 January–2 February 1998
Scorecard

| Pakistanis | v | Griqualand West |
| 418/8d (97 overs); Saeed Anwar 117 (156); GA Roe 3/98 (27 overs) | | 218 (86.4 overs); PH Barnard 101 (175); Mushtaq Ahmed 6/63 (27.4 overs) |
| 216/9d (69.1 overs); Aamer Sohail 61 (144); GJ Kruis 4/41 (17.1 overs) | | 109 (39.2 overs); W Bossenger 39 (46); Mushtaq Ahmed 5/18 (10.2 overs) |

Pakistanis won by 307 runs
De Beers Diamond Oval, Kimberley, Northern Cape
Umpires: SB Lambson and CJ Mitchley

- Pakistanis won the toss and elected to bat.

=== Four-day: Border v Pakistanis ===
6–8 February 1998
Scorecard

| Pakistanis | v | Border |
| 232 (62.4 overs); Yousuf Youhana 77 (139); M Ntini 3/99 (18 overs) | | 244 (54.4 overs); W Wiblin 82 (113); Azhar Mahmood 4/66 (18 overs) |
| 124 (39.5 overs); Moin Khan 42 (77); D Taljard 6/49 (17.5 overs) | | 113/5 (29 overs); PC Strydom 41* (36); Saqlain Mushtaq 2/26 (10 overs) |

Border won by 5 wickets
Buffalo Park, East London
Umpires: RE Koertzen and DL Orchard

- Pakistanis won the toss and elected to bat.
- The match was scheduled for four days but completed in three.

=== Three-day: Free State v Pakistanis ===
21–23 February 1998
Scorecard

| Free State | v | Pakistanis |
| 334/7d (91 overs); WJ Cronje 150* (199); Shoaib Akhtar 2/62 (16 overs) | | 441 (104.5 overs); Inzamam-ul-Haq 119 (142); JF Venter 4/106 (33.5 overs) |
| 21/3 (8.2 overs); JF Venter 8 (25); Fazl-e-Akbar 2/9 (4 overs) |

Match drawn
Goodyear Park, Bloemfontein
Umpires: WA Diedricks and DL Orchard

- Free State won the toss and elected to bat.

== Test matches ==
=== 1st Test ===
14–18 February 1998

| South Africa | v | Pakistan |
| 364 (104.2 overs); PL Symcox 108 (157); Mushtaq Ahmed 3/66 (27 overs) | | 360 (94.1 overs); Azhar Mahmood 136 (215); L Klusener 4/93 (24 overs) |
| 44/0 (10.3 overs); AM Bacher 20* (29); Waqar Younis 0/18 (5.3 overs) |

Match Drawn
New Wanderers, Johannesburg
Umpires: CJ Mitchley (SA) and P Willey (ENG)
Player of the match: PL Symcox (SA) and Azhar Mahmood (PAK)

- Pakistan won the toss and elected to field.

=== 2nd Test ===
26 February–2 March 1998

| Pakistan | v | South Africa |
| 259 (73.2 overs); Azhar Mahmood 132 (163); AA Donald 5/79 (19.2 overs) | | 231 (90 overs); SM Pollock 70* (106); Shoaib Akhtar 5/43 (12 overs) |
| 226 (79.3 overs); Saeed Anwar 118 (209); SM Pollock 6/50 (22.3 overs) | | 225 (88.2 overs); MV Boucher 52 (100); Mushtaq Ahmed 6/78 (37 overs) |

Pakistan won by 29 runs.
Kingsmead Cricket Ground, Durban
Umpires: MJ Kitchen (ENG) and DL Orchard (SA)
Player of the match: Mushtaq Ahmed (PAK)

- South Africa won the toss and elected to field.
- Fazl-e-Akbar and Yousuf Youhana (both PAK) and HD Ackerman (SA) made their Test debuts.

=== 3rd Test ===
6–10 March 1998
Scorecard

| South Africa | v | Pakistan |
| 293 (99 overs); WJ Cronje 85 (170); Waqar Younis 6/78 (23 overs) | | 106 (40.5 overs); Wasim Akram 30* (47); PS de Villiers 6/23 (11.5 overs) |
| 206/7d (65.4 overs); JH Kallis 69 (143); Waqar Younis 4/55 (17.4 overs) | | 134 (60.5 overs); Saeed Anwar 55 (109); AA Donald 4/27 (15 overs) |

South Africa won by 259 runs
St George's Park Cricket Ground, Port Elizabeth
Umpires: RS Dunne (NZ) and RE Koertzen (SA)
Player of the match: MV Boucher (SA)

- Pakistan won the toss and elected to field.
- There was no play on the second day.

== See also ==
- 1997–98 Standard Bank International One-Day Series
