= 1997–98 Silver Jubilee Independence Cup =

International cricket tournament

Silver jubilee independence cup 1998
- Dates: 10 – 18 January 1998
- Cricket format: One Day International
- Tournament format: Round-robin followed by Best of three Final
- Host: Bangladesh
- Champions: India (1st title)
- Runners-up: Pakistan
- Participants: 3
- Matches: 6
- Player of the series: (India) Sachin Tendulkar
- Most runs: (Pakistan) Saeed Anwar (315)
- Most wickets: (Pakistan) Saqlain Mushtaq (13)

The Silver Jubilee Independence Cup was a One Day International cricket tournament held in Dhaka, Bangladesh during January 1998. The tournament was held as a celebration of 25 years of Bangladesh's independence and all the games were held at Bangabandhu National Stadium, Dhaka, Bangladesh.India, Pakistan and the hosts Bangladesh were the participating teams in the tournament.

India were the winners of the tournament after beating Pakistan in the third final of the best of three finals. India successfully chased Pakistan's total of 314/5 in a match that, at the time, was a world record for the highest successful run chase in One Day International cricket. Hrishikesh Kanitkar hit a four ( Video )when 3 runs were required off the last two balls to help India chase down the record target and lift the Silver Jubilee Independence Cup.

Saurav Ganguly was awarded player of the match for his century in the third final, while Sachin Tendulkar was named the player of the series.

== Tournament format ==
The sides played each other in a round robin, meaning that each side played two matches. The top two teams at the end of the round-robin stage played each other in Best of Three Finals.

== Squads ==
Bangladesh	India	Pakistan
Akram Khan (c); Aminul Islam Bulbul; Khaled Mashud (wk); Habibul Bashar; Khaled Mahmud; Hasibul Hossain; Mohammad Rafique; Javed Omar; Sanwar Hossain; Shahriar Hossain; Hasanuzzaman; Zakir Hossain; Shariful Haque; Shafiuddin Ahmed	Mohammad Azharuddin (c); Ajay Jadeja (vc); Sourav Ganguly; Sachin Tendulkar; Navjot Sidhu; VVS Laxman; Hrishikesh Kanitkar; Nayan Mongia (wk); Sairaj Bahutule; Javagal Srinath; Debashish Mohanty; Robin Singh; Rahul Sanghvi; Harvinder Singh	Rashid Latif (c) (wk); Saeed Anwar (vc); Aamer Sohail; Aaqib Javed; Azhar Mahmood; Fazl-e-Akbar; Ijaz Ahmed; Inzamam-ul-Haq; Manzoor Akhtar; Mohammad Hussain; Mushtaq Ahmed; Saqlain Mushtaq; Shahid Afridi; Yousuf Youhana

The Pakistan Cricket Board announced a 14-member team for the tournament on 26 December 1997. Wicket-keeper-batsman Moin Khan, and pacemen Waqar Younis and Wasim Akram were dropped from the side that played the Champions Trophy. Akram had reportedly told the team's physiotherapist that he was "not fit" before leaving for England. Khan was replaced by Rashid Latif, who was made the captain, and Saeed Anwar the vice-captain. Other changes included exclusion of Akhtar Sarfraz and inclusion of Yousuf Youhana and Fazl-e-Akbar. The Bangladesh squad was announced on 7 January 1998. Many changes were made from the side that toured New Zealand that season. Spinner Shariful Haque, who last played in the 1994 ICC Trophy was included alongside Mohammad Rafique, who was returning after recovering from an injury. Shahriar Hossain, Khaled Mahmud and Zakir Hossain were other players included in the squad.

== Points Table ==
Pos	Team	Pld	W	NR	L	Pts	NRR
1	India	2	2	0	0	4	+0.326
2	Pakistan	2	1	0	1	2	+0.964
3	Bangladesh	2	0	0	2	0	−0.925

India and Pakistan progressed to the best of three finals after finishing in the top two of the points table

== Fixtures and results ==
=== Group stage ===
==== 1st match ====
10 January
Scorecard

Bangladesh; 190 (48 overs)	v	India; 191/6 (46.2 overs)
Aminul Islam 69* (96); Javagal Srinath 5/23 (10 overs)		Mohammad Azharuddin 84 (120); Shafiuddin Ahmed 2/40 (10 overs)

India won by 4 wickets
Bangabandhu National Stadium, Dhaka
Umpires: Doug Cowie (NZ) and Russell Tiffin (Zim)
Player of the match: Javagal Srinath (Ind)

- India won the toss and elected to field.
- The start of play was delayed by 40 minutes due to fog and was reduced to 48 overs per side.
- Khaled Mashud, Sanwar Hossain and Shariful Haque (Ban) made their ODI debuts.
- Points: India 2, Bangladesh 0

==== 2nd match ====
11 January
Scorecard

India; 245/7 (37 overs)	v	Pakistan; 227/9 (37 overs)
Mohammad Azharuddin 100 (111); Saqlain Mushtaq 4/41 (8 overs)		Inzamam-ul-Haq 77 (69); Harvinder Singh 3/47 (8 overs)

India won by 18 runs
Bangabandhu National Stadium, Dhaka
Umpires: Doug Cowie (NZ) and Rudi Koertzen (SA)
Player of the match: Mohammad Azharuddin (Ind)

- Pakistan won the toss and elected to field.
- The start of play was delayed due to fog and was reduced to 37 overs per side.
- Fazl-e-Akbar (Pak) made his ODI debut.
- This was Rashid Latif's first match as Pakistan captain.
- Sachin Tendulkar equalled the Indian record for most catches in an ODI (4).
- Points: India 2, Pakistan 0

==== 3rd match ====
12 January
Scorecard

Bangladesh; 134 (39.3 overs)	v	Pakistan; 136/1 (24.2 overs)
Mohammad Rafique 29 (34); Saqlain Mushtaq 3/33 (8 overs)		Saeed Anwar 73 (69); Shafiuddin Ahmed 1/42 (6 overs)

Pakistan won by 9 wickets
Bangabandhu National Stadium, Dhaka
Umpires: Rudi Koertzen (SA) and Russell Tiffin (Zim)
Player of the match: Saqlain Mushtaq (Pak)

- Pakistan won the toss and elected to field.
- The match was reduced to 41 over per side due to fog.
- Points: Pakistan 2, Bangladesh 0

=== Finals ===
==== 1st final ====
14 January 1998
Scorecard

Pakistan; 212/8 (46 overs)	v	India; 213/2 (37.1 overs)
Saeed Anwar 38 (60); Sachin Tendulkar 3/45 (7 overs)		Sachin Tendulkar 95 (78); Mushtaq Ahmed 1/48 (9 overs)

India won by 8 wickets
Bangabandhu National Stadium, Dhaka
Umpires: Doug Cowie (NZ) and Russell Tiffin (Zim)
Player of the match: Sachin Tendulkar (Ind)

- Pakistan won the toss and elected to bat.
- The start of play was delayed by 45 minutes due to fog and the match reduced to 46 overs per side.
- Sachin Tendulkar (Ind) became the youngest player to reach 6,000 runs in ODIs (24 years, 265 days).

==== 2nd final ====
16 January 1998
Scorecard

India; 189 (49.5 overs)	v	Pakistan; 193/4 (31.3 overs)
Mohammad Azharuddin 66 (88); Mohammad Hussain 4/33 (10 overs)		Saeed Anwar 51 (40); Robin Singh 2/42 (9 overs)

Pakistan won by 6 wickets
Bangabandhu National Stadium, Dhaka
Umpires: Doug Cowie (NZ) and Rudi Koertzen (SA)
Player of the match: Mohammad Hussain (Pak)

- India won the toss and elected to bat.

==== 3rd final ====
18 January (D/N)
Scorecard

Pakistan; 314/5 (48 overs)	v	India; 316/7 (47.5 overs)
Saeed Anwar 140 (132); Harvinder Singh 3/74 (10 overs)		Sourav Ganguly 124 (138); Saqlain Mushtaq 3/66 (9.5 overs)

India won by 3 wickets
Bangabandhu National Stadium, Dhaka
Umpires: Rudi Koertzen (SA) and Russell Tiffin (Zim)
Player of the match: Sourav Ganguly (Ind)

- India won the toss and elected to field.
- The match was reduced to 48 over per side due to bad light.
- Rahul Sanghvi (Ind) made his ODI debut.
- Saeed Anwar and Ijaz Ahmed (Pak) set a record for highest partnership for the third wicket (230 runs), before it was beaten by Rahul Dravid and Sourav Ganguly in 1999.
- This was the highest successful run-chase in ODIs surpassing Sri Lanka's 312 against Zimbabwe in 1992.

== Statistics ==
Most runs

Player	Inns	Runs	Ave	SR	HS	100	50
(Pakistan) Saeed Anwar	5	315	78.75	100.96	140	1	2
(India) Mohammad Azharuddin	5	284	71.00	77.17	100	1	2
(India) Sachin Tendulkar	5	258	51.60	112.17	95	0	3
(India) Sourav Ganguly	5	242	48.40	79.60	124	1	1
(Pakistan) Ijaz Ahmed	5	209	69.66	94.57	117	1	0

Most wickets

Player	Inns	Wkts	Ave	Econ	BBI
(Pakistan) Saqlain Mushtaq	5	13	17.61	5.61	4/41
(India) Javagal Srinath	5	11	18.36	4.59	5/23
(India) Harvinder Singh	4	8	21.75	6.21	3/47
(Pakistan) Aaqib Javed	5	7	28.14	5.34	2/27
(Pakistan) Mohammad Hussain	2	5	14.60	3.65	4/33
