= 1997 Pepsi Independence Cup =

International cricket tournament

- Dates: 9 – 27 May 1997
- Administrator: International Cricket Council
- Cricket format: One Day International
- Host: India
- Champions: Sri Lanka
- Runners-up: Pakistan
- Participants: 4
- Matches: 8
- Player of the series: (Sri Lanka) Sanath Jayasuriya
- Most runs: (Sri Lanka) Sanath Jayasuriya (306)
- Most wickets: (Pakistan) Saqlain Mushtaq (14)

The 1997 Pepsi Independence Cup was a quadrangular ODI cricket tournament held in May 1997 to commemorate the 50th anniversary of the independence of India. It featured the national cricket teams of New Zealand, Pakistan, Sri Lanka and the hosts India. The tournament was won by Sri Lanka, which defeated Pakistan in the best-of-three finals. Sri Lanka became the Champion.

== Indian independence celebrations ==
The tournament was organised by the Board of Control for Cricket in India (BCCI) and sponsored by PepsiCo as part of the many national celebrations being held in 1997 for the 50th anniversary of India's independence from colonial rule. The Independence Cup trophy featured a gold inscribed image of Indian leader Mahatma Gandhi and his followers on the Dandi March during the 1930–31 Salt Satyagraha. The tournament concept was later emulated in Sri Lanka, which held an Independence Cup tournament to mark its 50th anniversary of independence in 1998, and in Bangladesh in 1998. The BCCI also used the tournament to celebrate 50 years of Indian cricket. Along with a television documentary on the history of Indian cricket broadcast on Doordarshan, India's Test cricket captains were honoured during the 2nd final at the Eden Gardens in Calcutta (now Kolkata) – from the then 86-year-old Lala Amarnath to the then-captain, 24-year-old Sachin Tendulkar. All the captains took a lap around the Eden Gardens in a jeep, receiving a standing ovation from the 75,000-strong assembled crowd. Each man received a silver salver, while Vijay Hazare received the C. K. Nayadu Trophy. The captains honoured included Polly Umrigar, Datta Gaekwad, Pankaj Roy, Gulabrai Ramchand, Nari Contractor, Chandu Borde, Ajit Wadekar, Bishen Singh Bedi, Srinivasaraghavan Venkataraghavan, Sunil Gavaskar, Kapil Dev, Ravi Shastri, Krishnamachari Srikkanth and Mohammad Azharuddin.

== Squads ==
India	New Zealand	Pakistan	Sri Lanka
Sachin Tendulkar (c); Anil Kumble (vc); Dodda Ganesh; Abey Kuruvilla; Rahul Dravid; Ajay Jadeja; Venkatesh Prasad; Nayan Mongia (wk); Sunil Joshi; Gagan Khoda; Sourav Ganguly; Vinod Kambli; Noel David; Robin Singh	Stephen Fleming (c); Nathan Astle; Chris Cairns; Heath Davis; Chris Harris; Matt Horne; Gavin Larsen; Craig McMillan; Shayne O'Connor; Dipak Patel; Adam Parore (wk); Andrew Penn; Bryan Young; Daniel Vettori	Rameez Raja (c); Saeed Anwar; Inzamam-ul-Haq; Shahid Afridi; Ijaz Ahmed; Salim Malik; Mohammad Hussain; Aaqib Javed; Saqlain Mushtaq; Moin Khan (wk); Hasan Raza; Abdul Razzaq; Azhar Mahmood; Mohammad Wasim	Arjuna Ranatunga (c); Aravinda de Silva (vc); Roshan Mahanama; Hashan Tillakaratne; Sanath Jayasuriya; Romesh Kaluwitharana (wk); Muttiah Muralitharan; Ruwan Kalpage; Marvan Atapattu; Chaminda Vaas; Kumar Dharmasena; Sajeewa de Silva; Upul Chandana; Dulip Liyanage

The Indian team coach and manager for the tournament was Madan Lal. Notably missing from the squad was former captain and lead batsman Mohammad Azharuddin, who was dropped. Lead pace bowler Javagal Srinath was ruled out of the first half of the tournament due to a shoulder injury. Pakistan's line-up missed regular pace bowlers Wasim Akram, Waqar Younis and spin bowler Mushtaq Ahmed, who were playing county cricket in England. The Sri Lankan team had minor changes from the team that won the 1996 World Cup under the leadership of Arjuna Ranatunga.

== Points Table ==
Team	P	W	L	T	NR	NRR	Points
Sri Lanka	3	2	1	0	0	+0.478	4
Pakistan	3	2	1	0	0	−0.287	4
India	3	1	2	0	0	−0.331	2
New Zealand	3	1	2	0	0	−0.452	2

Source:ESPNcricinfo

== Matches ==
Using the round robin format, each team played the others once. New Zealand defeated Pakistan in the tournament opener, but proceeded to lose its other matches. Similarly, India succeeded in its opening match against New Zealand, but suffered defeats to Sri Lanka and Pakistan. After its loss to New Zealand, Pakistan's victories against Sri Lanka and India enabled it to qualify for the finals. Sri Lanka lost a high-scoring match to Pakistan, but defeated New Zealand and India to reach the finals.

9 May (D/N)
Scorecard

New Zealand; 285/7 (50 overs)	v	Pakistan; 263/9 (50 overs)
Nathan Astle 117 (132); Saqlain Mushtaq 3/38 (10 overs)		Shahid Afridi 59 (46); Nathan Astle 4/43 (8 overs)

New Zealand won by 22 runs
Punjab Cricket Association Stadium, Chandigarh
Umpires: K.T. Francis (SL) and S. Venkataraghavan (Ind)
Player of the match: Nathan Astle (NZ)

- Pakistan won the toss and elected to field.
- Mohammad Hussain (Pak) made his ODI debut.

12 May (D/N)
Scorecard

Pakistan; 289/6 (50 overs)	v	Sri Lanka; 259 (49.5 overs)
Shahid Afridi 52 (29); Sajeewa de Silva 3/59 (10 overs)		Arjuna Ranatunga 58 (60); Aaqib Javed 5/35 (10 overs)

Pakistan won by 30 runs
Captain Roop Singh Stadium, Gwalior
Umpires: Steve Dunne (NZ) and S. Venkataraghavan (Ind)
Player of the match: Aaqib Javed (Pak)

- Pakistan won the toss and elected to bat.

14 May (D/N)
Scorecard

New Zealand; 220/9 (50 overs)	v	India; 221/2 (42.3 overs)
Nathan Astle 92 (111); Robin Singh 2/27 (7 overs)		Sachin Tendulkar 117 (137); Nathan Astle 1/25 (7 overs)

India won by 8 wickets
M. Chinnaswamy Stadium, Bangalore
Umpires: Javed Akhtar (Pak) and Dave Orchard (SA)
Player of the match: Sachin Tendulkar (Ind)

- New Zealand won the toss and elected to bat.

17 May (D/N)
Scorecard

India; 225/7 (50 overs)	v	Sri Lanka; 229/5 (40.5 overs)
Ajay Jadeja 72 (102); Sajeewa de Silva 3/59 (10 overs)		Sanath Jayasuriya 151* (120); Abey Kuruvilla 2/22 (7 overs)

Sri Lanka won by 5 wickets
Wankhede Stadium, Mumbai
Umpires: Steve Dunne (NZ) and Dave Orchard (SA)
Player of the match: Sanath Jayasuriya (SL)

- India won the toss and elected to bat.
- Sanath Jayasuriya's score of 151* was the highest individual score by a Sri Lanka player in an ODI innings, before he broke his own record when he made 189 in 2000. After the innings, he held the record for best batting and bowling figures both by a Sri Lanka player in ODIs.

20 May (D/N)
Scorecard

Sri Lanka; 214 (48.3 overs)	v	New Zealand; 162 (44.5 overs)
Romesh Kaluwitharana 44 (36); Gavin Larsen 3/43 (9.3 overs)		Matt Horne 41* (73); Sanath Jayasuriya 2/21 (7 overs)

Sri Lanka won by 52 runs
Lal Bahadur Shastri Stadium, Hyderabad
Umpires: S. K. Bansal (Ind) and Javed Akhtar (Pak)
Player of the match: Romesh Kaluwitharana (SL)

- Sri Lanka won the toss and elected to bat.
- Craig McMillan and Shayne O'Connor (both NZ) made their ODI debuts.

21 May (D/N)
Scorecard

Pakistan; 327/5 (50 overs)	v	India; 292 (49.2 overs)
Saeed Anwar 194 (146); Sachin Tendulkar 2/61 (9 overs)		Rahul Dravid 107 (116); Aaqib Javed 5/61 (10 overs)

Pakistan won by 35 runs
MA Chidambaram Stadium, Chennai
Umpires: K. T. Francis (SL) and Dave Orchard (SA)
Player of the match: Saeed Anwar (Pak)

- Pakistan won the toss and elected to bat.
- Saeed Anwar's 194 was the highest individual score in an ODI innings before it was equalled by Charles Coventry (Zim) in 2009 and later broken by Sachin Tendulkar (Ind) who made 200* in 2010.

=== Finals ===
Pakistan and Sri Lanka squared-off in a best-of-three final series. The first final was in Chandigarh, and the second final (and if necessary, the third) was held at the Eden Gardens in Calcutta (now Kolkata). However, Sri Lanka won both the first and second finals, winning the tournament without the need for a third final to be played.

24 May (D/N)
Scorecard

Sri Lanka; 339/4 (50 overs)	v	Pakistan; 224 (43.5 overs)
Sanath Jayasuriya 96 (67); Mohammad Hussain 2/56 (10 overs)		Moin Khan 57 (61); Sajeewa de Silva 3/40 (7 overs)

Sri Lanka won by 115 runs
Punjab Cricket Association Stadium, Chandigarh
Umpires: Steve Dunne (NZ) and S. Venkataraghavan (Ind)
Player of the match: Sanath Jayasuriya (SL)

- Sri Lanka won the toss and elected to bat.
- Sanath Jayasuriya and Marvan Atapattu set a record for the highest partnership for the first wicket for Sri Lanka in ODIs (148), before the pair bettered it later that year.

27 May (D/N)
Scorecard

Sri Lanka; 309 (49.4 overs)	v	Pakistan; 224 (43.1 overs)
Arjuna Ranatunga 59 (77); Saqlain Mushtaq 4/53 (9.4 overs)		Rameez Raja 76 (101); Muttiah Muralitharan 3/40 (10 overs)

Sri Lanka won by 85 runs
Eden Gardens, Calcutta
Attendance: 85,000
Umpires: Steve Dunne (NZ) and Dave Orchard (SA)
Player of the match: Aravinda de Silva (SL)

- Sri Lanka won the toss and elected to bat.
- The crowd of an estimated 85,000 was the largest at this venue for an ODI that did not feature India.

== Records and awards ==
The player of the tournament award was Sanath Jayasuriya, who scored the most runs in the tournament, 306, with one century and two fifties, and took 5 wickets to add. Pakistan's Saqlain Mushtaq took the most wickets in the tournament, bagging 14. Pakistani batsman Saeed Anwar's innings of 194 against India in Chennai became the record for the highest runs in a single innings by any batsman in ODI cricket. The record stood until 2010, when India's Sachin Tendulkar became the first batsman in ODI history to score a 200 not out against South Africa in Gwalior.

== See also ==
- 1997 Wills Golden Jubilee Tournament
- 1997–98 Silver Jubilee Independence Cup
