= 1997–98 Standard Bank International One-Day Series =

International cricket tournament

1997-98 Standard Bank International One-Day Series
- Part of Pakistani cricket team in South Africa in 1997–98 and Sri Lankan cricket team in South Africa in 1997–98
- Date: 3–23 April 1998
- Location: South Africa
- Result: Won by South Africa
- Player of the series: JN Rhodes
Teams
South Africa	Pakistan	Sri Lanka
Captains
WJ Cronje	Rashid Latif	A Ranatunga
Most runs
JH Kallis (267)	Inzamam-ul-Haq (234)	A Ranatunga (272)
Most wickets
R Telemachus (12)	Wasim Akram (15)	M Muralitharan (14)

The Standard Bank International Series was the name of the One Day International cricket tournament in South Africa for the 1997-98 season. It was a tri-nation series between South Africa, Pakistan and Sri Lanka.

South Africa booked a slot into the Final through winning five matches out of the six they played. The slot for the second finalist was decided in the last league match between South Africa and Sri Lanka. Sri Lanka had to beat South Africa to qualify. When they were beaten, Pakistan and Sri Lanka tied on points. Pakistan qualified for the Final by having a better head-to-head record against Sri Lanka, having won two and lost one of the matches between the two teams.

South Africa beat Pakistan in the Final to win the series.

Arjuna Ranatunga of Sri Lanka emerged as the top run-scorer with 272 runs, with an average of 54.40; Jacques Kallis of South Africa followed close behind with 267 runs. Wasim Akram of Pakistan finished the series as top wicket-taker capturing 15 wickets, with Muttiah Muralitharan of Sri Lanka taking 14. Jonty Rhodes was named "man of the series".

== Squads ==
South Africa	Pakistan	Sri Lanka
Hansie Cronje (c); Daryll Cullinan; Mark Boucher (wk); Jonty Rhodes; Pat Symcox; Gary Kirsten; Shaun Pollock; Lance Klusener; Mike Rindel; Roger Telemachus; Jacques Kallis; Derek Crookes; Allan Donald; Herschelle Gibbs; Steve Elworthy	Rashid Latif (c, wk); Aamer Sohail; Saeed Anwar; Ijaz Ahmed; Moin Khan (wk); Azhar Mahmood; Waqar Younis; Shoaib Akhtar; Inzamam-ul-Haq; Wasim Akram; Mohammed Wasim; Yousuf Youhana; Saqlain Mushtaq; Abdul Razzaq; Shahid Afridi; Mohammad Hussain	Arjuna Ranatunga (c); Aravinda de Silva (vc); Roshan Mahanama; Sanath Jayasuriya; Marvan Atapattu; Mahela Jayawardene; Romesh Kaluwitharana (wk); Chaminda Vaas; Ravindra Pushpakumara; Muttiah Muralitharan; Kumar Dharmasena; Upul Chandana; Pramodya Wickramasinghe; Sajeewa de Silva; ~~Nuwan Zoysa~~

Nuwan Zoysa joined the Sri Lankan party on 25 March to replace Chaminda Vaas who suffered a right ankle injury in the 1st Test. However, Zoysa twisted a knee so Vaas was reckoned to be fit enough to play in the one-day series.

== Points table ==
Team	Pld	W	L	T	NR	Pts	NRR
South Africa	6	5	1	0	0	10	+1.038
Pakistan	6	2	4	0	0	4	−0.472
Sri Lanka	6	2	4	0	0	4	−0.553

== Group stage matches ==
=== 1st match ===
3 April 1998 (D/N)
Scorecard

South Africa; 280/4 (50 overs)	v	Pakistan; 228 (47.4 overs)
JH Kallis 109* (114); Wasim Akram 2/39 (10 overs)		Moin Khan 45 (57); L Klusener 3/31 (10 overs)

South Africa won by 52 runs
Kingsmead, Durban
Umpires: WA Diedricks (SA) and DL Orchard (SA)
Player of the match: JH Kallis (SA)

- South Africa won the toss and elected to bat.
- S Elworthy and R Telemachus (both SA) made their ODI debuts.

=== 2nd match ===
5 April 1998
Scorecard

South Africa; 266/8 (50 overs)	v	Sri Lanka; 209 (46.3 overs)
MJR Rindel 59 (66); UDU Chandana 3/48 (10 overs)		ST Jayasuriya 68 (83); R Telemachus 4/43 (10 overs)

South Africa won by 57 runs
New Wanderers, Johannesburg
Umpires: SB Lambson (SA) and CJ Mitchley (SA)
Player of the match: R Telemachus (SA)

- South Africa won the toss and elected to bat.

=== 3rd match ===
7 April 1998
Scorecard

Sri Lanka; 295/7 (50 overs)	v	Pakistan; 300/6 (48 overs)
A Ranatunga 86 (82); Wasim Akram 3/53 (10 overs)		Inzamam-ul-Haq 116* (110); HDPK Dharmasena 2/35 (10 overs)

Pakistan won by 4 wickets
De Beers Diamond Oval, Kimberley, Northern Cape
Umpires: DF Becker (SA) and RE Koertzen (SA)
Player of the match: Inzamam-ul-Haq (PAK)

- Sri Lanka won the toss and elected to bat.

=== 4th match ===
9 April 1998 (D/N)
Scorecard

Pakistan; 249 (48.5 overs)	v	Sri Lanka; 139 (34.2 overs)
Ijaz Ahmed 65 (78); PA de Silva 4/45 (7.5 overs)		PA de Silva 31 (42); Wasim Akram 3/24 (7.2 overs)

Pakistan won by 110 runs
Boland Park, Paarl
Umpires: WA Diedricks (SA) and CJ Mitchley (SA)
Player of the match: Wasim Akram (PAK)

- Pakistan won the toss and elected to bat.

=== 5th match ===
11 April 1998
Scorecard

Pakistan; 250/8 (50 overs)	v	South Africa; 254/7 (46.2 overs)
Wasim Akram 57 (64); WJ Cronje 2/17 (10 overs)		SM Pollock 66 (77); Azhar Mahmood 3/50 (10 overs)

South Africa won by 3 wickets
Buffalo Park, East London
Umpires: SB Lambson (SA) and DL Orchard (SA)
Player of the match: WJ Cronje (SA)

- South Africa won the toss and elected to field.

=== 6th match ===
13 April 1998
Scorecard

South Africa; 231 (49.5 overs)	v	Sri Lanka; 232/4 (46.4 overs)
G Kirsten 46 (50); WPUJC Vaas 3/33 (7.5 overs)		A Ranatunga 93* (118); R Telemachus 2/37 (7 overs)

Sri Lanka won by 6 wickets
St George's Park Cricket Ground, Port Elizabeth
Umpires: DF Becker (SA) and RE Koertzen (SA)
Player of the match: A Ranatunga (SL)

- South Africa won the toss and elected to bat.

=== 7th match ===
15 April 1998
Scorecard

Sri Lanka; 288 (49.4 overs)	v	Pakistan; 173 (39.2 overs)
MS Atapattu 94 (123); Wasim Akram 4/43 (9.4 overs)		Saeed Anwar 59 (86); M Muralitharan 5/23 (9.2 overs)

Sri Lanka won by 115 runs
Willowmoore Park, Benoni, Gauteng
Umpires: SB Lambson (SA) and CJ Mitchley (SA)
Player of the match: MS Atapattu (SL)

- Pakistan won the toss and elected to field.

=== 8th match ===
17 April 1998
Scorecard

Pakistan; 145 (41.5 overs)	v	South Africa; 149/3 (35.3 overs)
Inzamam-ul-Haq 33 (60); S Elworthy 3/28 (9 overs)		JH Kallis 79* (122); Azhar Mahmood 1/19 (5 overs)

South Africa won by 7 wickets
Centurion Park, Centurion, Gauteng
Umpires: WA Diedricks (SA) and RE Koertzen (SA)
Player of the match: JH Kallis (SA)

- Pakistan won the toss and elected to bat.

=== 9th match ===
19 April 1998
Scorecard

Sri Lanka; 105 (36 overs)	v	South Africa; 106/5 (26.3 overs)
RS Mahanama 22 (36); SM Pollock 3/21 (8 overs)		JH Kallis 39 (51); GP Wickramasinghe 2/22 (8 overs)

South Africa won by 5 wickets
Goodyear Park, Bloemfontein
Umpires: DF Becker (SA) and DL Orchard (SA)
Player of the match: R Telemachus (SA)

- South Africa won the toss and elected to field.

== Final ==
22, 23 April 1998
Scorecard

Pakistan; 114 (37.1 overs)	v	South Africa; 115/1 (27.4 overs)
Saeed Anwar 30 (40); L Klusener 5/25 (7.1 overs)		G Kirsten 52* (77); Wasim Akram 1/29 (10 overs)

South Africa won by 9 wickets
Newlands, Cape Town
Umpires: RE Koertzen (SA) and CJ Mitchley (SA)
Player of the match: L Klusener (SA)

- South Africa won the toss and elected to field.
- No play was possible on the scheduled first day. Match played on the reserve day.
