= 1997 Wills Golden Jubilee Tournament =

International cricket tournament

The 1997 Wills Golden Jubilee Tournament (also known as the Wills Quadrangular Tournament) was a quadrangular one-day cricket competition held in November, 1997 in Pakistan to mark that country's 50th anniversary of independence. It featured the national cricket teams of Sri Lanka, South Africa, West Indies and the hosts Pakistan. All the matches were held at the Gaddafi Stadium in Lahore. Defeating Sri Lanka in the final, South Africa won its first tournament in the Indian subcontinent in its seventh attempt.

== Background ==
Following the model of the 1997 Pepsi Independence Cup that celebrated India's 50th anniversary of independence, the Wills Golden Jubilee Tournament sought to mark the 50 years of Pakistan's independence. During the final of the tournament, the Pakistan Cricket Board honoured all the living Test cricket captains of Pakistan by parading them in horse-drawn carriages and presenting them with gold medals. The only Pakistan captain not to attend was Imran Khan, who excused himself due to political commitments. Sri Lanka, the winners of the 1996 Cricket World Cup and the 1997 Asia Cup, were the leading favourites along with the dominant South African team. The matches were affected by night-time heavy dew and insects on the field. The white-coloured cricket ball frequently became soggy and discoloured. These conditions gave the team that batted second a clear advantage.

== Squads ==
West Indies	Sri Lanka	Pakistan	South Africa
Courtney Walsh (c); Brian Lara (vc); Sherwin Campbell; Curtly Ambrose; Shivnarine Chanderpaul; Carl Hooper; Phil Simmons; Franklyn Rose; Mervyn Dillon; Roland Holder; Rawl Lewis; David Williams (wk); Ian Bishop	Arjuna Ranatunga (c); Aravinda de Silva (vc); Chaminda Vaas; Lanka de Silva (wk); Roshan Mahanama; Muttiah Muralitharan; Hashan Tillakaratne; Sanath Jayasuriya; Kumar Dharmasena; Marvan Atapattu; Sajeewa de Silva; Dulip Liyanage; Russell Arnold	Wasim Akram (c); Saeed Anwar; Shahid Afridi; Rashid Latif (wk); Azhar Mahmood; Saqlain Mushtaq; Waqar Younis; Moin Khan (wk); Ijaz Ahmed; Aamir Sohail; Inzamam-ul-Haq	Hansie Cronje (c); Gary Kirsten; Dave Richardson (wk); Fanie de Villiers; Paul Adams; Pat Symcox; Jonty Rhodes; Shaun Pollock; Daryll Cullinan; Lance Klusener; Andrew Hudson; Allan Donald

== Points Table ==
Team	P	W	L	T	NR	NRR	Points
South Africa	3	3	0	0	0	+0.599	6
Sri Lanka	3	2	1	0	0	+0.387	4
Pakistan	3	1	2	0	0	−0.069	2
West Indies	3	0	3	0	0	−0.917	0

Source:ESPN Cricinfo

== Matches ==
1 November
Scorecard

West Indies; 237/8 (50 overs)	v	Sri Lanka; 240/3 (39.4 overs)
Brian Lara 80 (108); Sajeewa de Silva 2/31 (10 overs)		Roshan Mahanama 94* (109); Carl Hooper 1/31 (8 overs)

Sri Lanka won by 7 wickets
Gaddafi Stadium, Lahore
Umpires: Javed Akhtar (Pak) and Saleem Badar (Pak)
Player of the match: Arjuna Ranatunga (SL)

- Sri Lanka won the toss and chose to field.

2 November
Scorecard

South Africa; 271 (48 overs)	v	Pakistan; 262/9 (50 overs)
Gary Kirsten 89 (110); Wasim Akram 4/33 (10 overs)		Inzamam-ul-Haq 85 (116); Shaun Pollock 4/49 (10 overs)

South Africa won by 9 runs
Gaddafi Stadium, Lahore
Umpires: Steve Dunne (NZ) and Ian Robinson (Zim)
Player of the match: Shaun Pollock (SA)

- Pakistan won the toss and chose to field.

3 November
Scorecard

West Indies; 293/8 (50 overs)	v	South Africa; 297/5 (48.1 overs)
Carl Hooper 105 (101); Fanie de Villiers 2/40 (10 overs)		Hansie Cronje 94 (95); Carl Hooper 1/49 (10 overs)

South Africa won by 5 wickets
Gaddafi Stadium, Lahore
Umpires: Javed Akhtar (Pak) and Said Shah (Pak)
Player of the match: Hansie Cronje (SA)

- South Africa won the toss and chose to field.

4 November
Scorecard

West Indies; 215/8 (50 overs)	v	Pakistan; 219/2 (40.4 overs)
Stuart Williams 75 (102); Saqlain Mushtaq 3/35 (10 overs)		Saeed Anwar 108 (129); Courtney Walsh 1/43 (7.4 overs)

Pakistan won by 8 wickets
Gaddafi Stadium, Lahore
Umpires: Steve Dunne (NZ) and Ian Robinson (Zim)
Player of the match: Saeed Anwar (Pak)

- Pakistan won the toss and chose to field.
- IR Bishop played his last ODI game.

5 November
Scorecard

Pakistan; 280 (49.4 overs)	v	Sri Lanka; 281/2 (40 overs)
Ijaz Ahmed 94 (110); Sajeewa de Silva 3/58 (9.4 overs)		Sanath Jayasuriya 134 (114); Azhar Mahmood 1/53 (8 overs)

Sri Lanka won by 8 wickets
Gaddafi Stadium, Lahore
Umpires: Steve Dunne (NZ) and Ian Robinson (Zim)
Player of the match: Sanath Jayasuriya (SL)

- Sri Lanka won the toss and chose to field.

6 November
Scorecard

South Africa; 311/9 (50 overs)	v	Sri Lanka; 245/9 (50 overs)
Lance Klusener 54 (41); Kumar Dharmasena 3/46 (10 overs)		Kumar Dharmasena 69 (83); Lance Klusener 6/49 (10 overs)

South Africa won by 66 runs
Gaddafi Stadium, Lahore
Umpires: Mian Mohammad Aslam (Pak) and Mohammad Nazir (Pak)
Player of the match: Lance Klusener (SA)

- Sri Lanka won the toss and chose to field.

=== Final ===
8 November
Scorecard

Sri Lanka; 209/7 (50 overs)	v	South Africa; 210/6 (40.4 overs)
Arjuna Ranatunga 32 (56); Shaun Pollock 3/42 (10 overs)		Lance Klusener 99 (96); Sajeewa de Silva 2/48 (6 overs)

South Africa won by 4 wickets
Gaddafi Stadium, Lahore
Umpires: Javed Akhtar (Pak) and Saleem Badar (Pak)
Player of the match: Lance Klusener (SA)

- South Africa won the toss and chose to field.

== Records and awards ==
South Africa's Lance Klusener bagged the player of the series award, having top-scored in the tournament with 215 runs and taken 8 wickets as well.
