= Pakistani cricket team in Zimbabwe in 1997–98 =

International cricket tour

The Pakistani national cricket team visited Zimbabwe in March 1998 and played a two-match Test series against the Zimbabwean national cricket team followed by two One Day Internationals (ODIs). Pakistan won the Test series 1–0, and the ODI series 2–0. In both the Test and ODI series, Pakistan were captained by Rashid Latif and Zimbabwe by Alistair Campbell.

== Test series summary ==
=== 1st Test ===
14–18 March 1998
Scorecard

Zimbabwe	v	Pakistan
321 (112.2 overs); Grant Flower 156* (329); Waqar Younis 5/106 (28.2 overs)		256 (109.1 overs); Yousuf Youhana 60 (172); Guy Whittall 4/63 (27 overs)
302/4d (80.2 overs); Murray Goodwin 166* (204); Waqar Younis 2/18 (11 overs)		258/6 (98.3 overs); Moin Khan 97 (166); Heath Streak 3/42 (18 overs)

Match drawn
Queens Sports Club, Bulawayo
Umpires: Ian Robinson (Zim) and David Shepherd (Eng)
Player of the match: Grant Flower (Zim)

- Zimbabwe won the toss and elected to bat.
- Trevor Madondo and Dirk Viljoen (both Zim) made their Test debuts.

=== 2nd Test ===
21–25 March 1998
Scorecard

Zimbabwe	v	Pakistan
277 (82.5 overs); Guy Whittall 62 (92); Waqar Younis 4/47 (20 overs)		354 (147.5 overs); Mohammad Wasim 192 (407); Pommie Mbangwa 3/56 (33 overs)
268 (111 overs); Murray Goodwin 81 (250); Azhar Mahmood 3/26 (16 overs)		192/7 (53.5 overs); Saeed Anwar 65 (89); Guy Whittall 2/35 (15 overs)

Pakistan won by 3 wickets
Harare Sports Club, Harare
Umpires: Steve Randell (Aus) and Russell Tiffin (Zim)
Player of the match: Mohammad Wasim (Pak)

- Zimbabwe won the toss and elected to bat.

== ODI series summary ==
=== 1st ODI ===
28 March 1998
Scorecard

Zimbabwe; 236/6 (50 overs)	v	Pakistan; 237/6 (47.4 overs)
Heath Streak 48* (57); Azhar Mahmood 2/34 (9 overs)		Aamer Sohail 77 (104); Guy Whittall 2/35 (9.4 overs)

Pakistan won by 4 wickets
Harare Sports Club, Harare
Umpires: Kevan Barbour (Zim) and Ian Robinson (Zim)
Player of the match: Aamer Sohail (Pak)

- Pakistan won the toss and elected to field.
- Shoaib Akhtar and Yousuf Youhana (both Pak) made their ODI debuts.

=== 2nd ODI ===
29 March 1998
Scorecard

Zimbabwe; 272/4 (50 overs)	v	Pakistan; 276/6 (46.4 overs)
Grant Flower 81 (103); Mohammad Hussain 2/60 (10 overs)		Mohammad Wasim 76 (91); Heath Streak 2/36 (8 overs)

Pakistan won by 4 wickets
Harare Sports Club, Harare
Umpires: Graeme Evans (Zim) and Russell Tiffin (Zim)
Player of the match: Mohammad Wasim (Pak)

- Pakistan won the toss and elected to field.
