= 1997–98 Singer Akai Champions Trophy =

International cricket tournament

1997 Singer-Akai Champions Trophy
- Cricket format: One Day International
- Host: United Arab Emirates
- Champions: England
- Runners-up: West Indies
- Participants: 4
- Matches: 7
- Player of the series: (Cricket West Indies) Carl Hooper
- Most runs: (Cricket West Indies) Stuart Williams (259)
- Most wickets: (Pakistan) Saqlain Mushtaq (9) (England) Matthew Fleming (9)

The 1997 Singer-Akai Champions Trophy was held in Sharjah, UAE, between December 11–19, 1997. Four national teams took part: England, India, Pakistan, and West Indies.

The 1997 Singer-Akai Champions Trophy started with a round-robin tournament where each team played the other once. The two leading teams qualified for the final. England won the tournament and US$40,000. Runners-up West Indies won US$25,000.

== Squads ==
| England | India | Pakistan | West Indies |
|---|---|---|---|
| Adam Hollioake (captain); Ali Brown; Dougie Brown; Robert Croft; Mark Ealham; Matthew Fleming; Ashley Giles; Dean Headley; Graham Hick; Ben Hollioake; Nick Knight; Peter Martin; Alec Stewart (wicketkeeper); Graham Thorpe | Sachin Tendulkar (captain); Ajay Jadeja; Navjot Singh Sidhu; Sourav Ganguly; Mohammad Azharuddin; Vinod Kambli; Rahul Dravid; Robin Singh; Saba Karim; Javagal Srinath; Abey Kuruvilla; Venkatesh Prasad; Rajesh Chauhan; Anil Kumble | Wasim Akram (captain); Saeed Anwar; Aamer Sohail; Ijaz Ahmed; Inzamam-ul-Haq; Moin Khan; Azhar Mahmood; Waqar Younis; Aaqib Javed; Mushtaq Ahmed; Saqlain Mushtaq; Manzoor Akhtar; Shahid Afridi; Akhtar Sarfraz | Courtney Walsh (captain); Sherwin Campbell; Stuart Williams; Philo Wallace; Shivnarine Chanderpaul; Brian Lara; Carl Hooper; Roland Holder; Phil Simmons; David Williams (wicketkeeper); Ian Bishop; Franklyn Rose; Mervyn Dillon; Rawl Lewis |

== Group stage points table ==
| Team | P | W | L | T | NR | NRR | Points |
|---|---|---|---|---|---|---|---|
| England | 3 | 3 | 0 | 0 | 0 | +0.233 | 6 |
| West Indies | 3 | 2 | 1 | 0 | 0 | +0.436 | 4 |
| Pakistan | 3 | 1 | 2 | 0 | 0 | -0.231 | 2 |
| India | 3 | 0 | 3 | 0 | 0 | -0.434 | 0 |

== Group stage ==
=== 1st Match ===
11 December 1997 (D/N)
Scorecard

| England; 250 (49.5 overs) | v | India; 243 (49.3 overs) |
| AJ Stewart 116 (111); J Srinath 3/37 (8.5 overs) | | SR Tendulkar 91 (87); MV Fleming 4/45 (9.3 overs) |

England won by 7 runs
Sharjah Cricket Stadium, Sharjah, UAE
Umpires: SA Bucknor (WI) and KT Francis (SL)
Player of the match: AJ Stewart (ENG)

- India won the toss and elected to field.
- DR Brown and MV Fleming (both ENG) made their ODI debuts.

=== 2nd Match ===
12 December 1997 (D/N)
Scorecard

| West Indies; 275/7 (50 overs) | v | Pakistan; 232 (46 overs) |
| BC Lara 88 (80); Saqlain Mushtaq 3/35 (10 overs) | | Shahid Afridi 67 (56); CA Walsh 2/14 (8 overs) |

West Indies won by 43 runs
Sharjah Cricket Stadium, Sharjah, UAE
Umpires: BC Cooray (SL) and CJ Mitchley (SA)
Player of the match: BC Lara (WI)

- West Indies won the toss and elected to bat.
- Akhtar Sarfraz (PAK) made his ODI debut.

=== 3rd Match ===
13 December 1997 (D/N)
Scorecard

| West Indies; 197/7 (50 overs) | v | England; 198/6 (45.5 overs) |
| CL Hooper 100* (135); DR Brown 2/28 (7 overs) | | GP Thorpe 57 (75); M Dillon 2/38 (10 overs) |

England won by 4 wickets
Sharjah Cricket Stadium, Sharjah, UAE
Umpires: BC Cooray (SL) and KT Francis (SL)
Player of the match: CL Hooper (WI)

- West Indies won the toss and elected to bat.

=== 4th Match ===
14 December 1997 (D/N)
Scorecard

| India; 239/7 (50 overs) | v | Pakistan; 243/6 (47.2 overs) |
| SC Ganguly 90 (128); Saqlain Mushtaq 2/55 (10 overs) | | Saeed Anwar 104 (128); A Kumble 2/44 (10 overs) |

Pakistan won by 4 wickets
Sharjah Cricket Stadium, Sharjah, UAE
Umpires: SA Bucknor (WI) and CJ Mitchley (SA)
Player of the match: Saeed Anwar (PAK)

- India won the toss and elected to bat.
- Manzoor Akhtar (PAK) made his ODI debut.

=== 5th Match ===
15 December 1997 (D/N)
Scorecard

| England; 215/9 (50 overs) | v | Pakistan; 207 (49 overs) |
| AJ Stewart 47 (66); Saqlain Mushtaq 4/26 (10 overs) | | Saeed Anwar 54 (66); AJ Hollioake 2/35 (10 overs) |

England won by 8 runs
Sharjah Cricket Stadium, Sharjah, UAE
Umpires: SA Bucknor (WI) and CJ Mitchley (SA)
Player of the match: Manzoor Akhtar (PAK)

- England won the toss and elected to bat.

=== 6th Match ===
16 December 1997 (D/N)
Scorecard

| West Indies; 229/6 (50 overs) | v | India; 188 (42.2 overs) |
| SC Williams 105* (149); RK Chauhan 2/30 (10 overs) | | SC Ganguly 70 (94); CL Hooper 4/37 (8.2 overs) |

West Indies won by 41 runs
Sharjah Cricket Stadium, Sharjah, UAE
Umpires: BC Cooray (SL) and CJ Mitchley (SA)
Player of the match: SC Williams (WI)

- India won the toss and elected to field.

== Final ==
19 December 1997 (D/N)
Scorecard

| West Indies; 235/7 (50 overs) | v | England; 239/7 (48.1 overs) |
| S Chanderpaul 76 (109); MV Fleming 3/42 (8 overs) | | GP Thorpe 66* (74); CL Hooper 2/35 (10 overs) |

England won by 3 wickets
Sharjah Cricket Stadium, Sharjah, UAE
Umpires: KT Francis (SL) and CJ Mitchley (SA)
Player of the match: GP Thorpe (ENG)

- West Indies won the toss and elected to bat.

== See also ==
- Sharjah Cup
