= Sri Lankan cricket team in South Africa in 1997–98 =

International cricket tour

Sri Lanka in South Africa 1997-98
	South Africa	Sri Lanka
- Dates: 7 March 1998 – 30 March 1998
Captains	Hansie Cronje	Arjuna Ranatunga

Test series
- Result: South Africa won the 2-match series 2–0
Most runs	Darryl Cullinan (284)	Aravinda de Silva (156)
Most wickets	Allan Donald (14)	Muttiah Muralitharan (16)
- Player of the series: Darryl Cullinan (SA)

The Sri Lankan cricket team toured South Africa during the 1997–98 season, playing two Tests from 19 to 30 March 1998. Prior to the series, Sri Lanka had toured South Africa in the 1994–95 season, playing only One Day Internationals in the Mandela Trophy. This was therefore the first Test series between the two in South Africa.

Sri Lanka was led by Arjuna Ranatunga while South Africa was led by Hansie Cronje. The tour began with a Test series consisting of two matches. South Africa won both matches, winning the series 2–0. At the end of the series, Darryl Cullinan of South Africa emerged as the top run-scorer with 284 runs, with an average of 71.00. Muttiah Muralitharan and Allan Donald finished the series as top wicket-takers capturing 16 and 14 wickets respectively. Cullinan was named "man of the series".

The Test series was followed by a triangular One-Day tournament, which included Pakistan as the third team. Sri Lanka were excluded at the group stage, having won as many matches as Pakistan, but having a worse head-to-head record against them.

== Squads ==
Tests
South Africa	Sri Lanka
Hansie Cronje (c); Gary Kirsten; Adam Bacher (replaced by Gerhardus Liebenberg for the 2nd Test); Jacques Kallis; Hylton Ackerman; Daryll Cullinan; Paul Adams; Shaun Pollock; Mark Boucher (wk); Lance Klusener; Makhaya Ntini; Allan Donald	Arjuna Ranatunga (c); Aravinda de Silva (vc); Roshan Mahanama; Sanath Jayasuriya; Marvan Atapattu; Mahela Jayawardene; Romesh Kaluwitharana (wk); Chaminda Vaas; Ravindra Pushpakumara; Muttiah Muralitharan; Kumar Dharmasena; Upul Chandana; Russel Arnold; Hashan Tillakaratne; Pramodya Wickramasinghe; Sajeewa de Silva

== Tour matches ==
=== Three-day: Gauteng v Sri Lankans ===
7–9 March 1998
Scorecard

Gauteng	v	Sri Lankans
296/7d (74.2 overs); ND McKenzie 135 (201); UDU Chandana 4/80 (23.2 overs)		243/8d (71.2 overs); HP Tillakaratne 66* (158); RP Snell 3/42 (16.2 overs)
203/8d (54 overs); AJ Seymore 52 (122); GP Wickramasinghe 3/42 (14 overs)		138 (35.5 overs); RS Kaluwitharana 42 (41); RP Snell 3/51 (13 overs)

Gauteng won by 118 runs
New Wanderers, Johannesburg
Umpires: DF Becker and WA Diedricks

- Gauteng won the toss and elected to bat.

=== 50-over: North West v Sri Lankans ===
11 March 1998
Scorecard

Sri Lankans; 295/8 (50 overs)	v	North West; 202 (47.2 overs)
RP Arnold 113; JN Dreyer 2/51 (8 overs)		MJ Lavine 51; PA de Silva 5/44 (9.2 overs)

Sri Lankans won by 93 runs
Gert Van Rensburg Stadium, Fochville
Umpires: H Bekker and SB Lambson

- Sri Lankans won the toss and elected to bat.

=== Three-day: Boland v Sri Lankans ===
14–16 March 1998
Scorecard

Boland	v	Sri Lankans
178 (74.3 overs); JM Henderson 33 (137); M Muralitharan 4/40 (24.3 overs)		213/4d (92 overs); RS Mahanama 82 (173); R Telemachus 3/26 (19 overs)
160/7d (88 overs); JM Henderson 61* (270); M Muralitharan 5/30 (27 overs)		48/5 (18 overs); PA de Silva 21* (42); R Telemachus 4/30 (7 overs)

Match drawn
Boland Bank Park, Paarl
Umpires: RE Koertzen and DL Orchard

- Boland won the toss and elected to bat.

== Test matches ==
=== 1st Test ===
19–23 March 1998
Scorecard

South Africa	v	Sri Lanka
418 (124.4 overs); DJ Cullinan 113 (159); M Muralitharan 4/135 (45 overs)		306 (84.3 overs); PA de Silva 77 (98); SM Pollock 4/83 (26 overs)
264 (103 overs); WJ Cronje 74 (147); ST Jayasuriya 4/53 (33 overs)		306 (95.3 overs); MS Atapattu 71 (200); AA Donald 3/64 (20 overs)

South Africa won by 70 runs
Newlands, Cape Town
Umpires: RS Dunne (NZ) and DL Orchard (SA)
Player of the match: SM Pollock (SA)

- South Africa won the toss and elected to bat.
- M Ntini (SA) made his Test debut.

=== 2nd Test ===
27–30 March 1998
Scorecard

Sri Lanka	v	South Africa
303 (118.3 overs); A Ranatunga 73 (177); WJ Cronje 3/21 (14.3 overs)		200 (78 overs); DJ Cullinan 103 (185); M Muralitharan 5/63 (30 overs)
122 (41.3 overs); PA de Silva 41 (75); AA Donald 5/54 (13.3 overs)		226/4 (62.5 overs); WJ Cronje 82 (63); M Muralitharan 3/94 (23.5 overs)

South Africa won by 6 wickets
Centurion Park, Centurion, Gauteng
Umpires: Javed Akhtar (PAK) and RE Koertzen (SA)
Player of the match: AA Donald (SA)

- Sri Lanka won the toss and elected to bat.
- The match was scheduled for five days but completed in four.
- GFJ Liebenberg (SA) made his Test debut.

== See also ==
- 1997–98 Standard Bank International One-Day Series
