= 1997 'Friendship' Cup =

International cricket tournament

1997 Friendship Cup
- Administrator: International Cricket Council
- Cricket format: One Day International
- Host: Canada
- Champions: India
- Participants: 2
- Matches: 6
- Player of the series: (India) Sourav Ganguly
- Most runs: (India) Sourav Ganguly (222)
- Most wickets: (India) Sourav Ganguly (15)

The 1997 'Friendship Cup' , also known as the 1997 Sahara 'Friendship Cup' for sponsorship reasons, was a One Day International cricket series which took place between 13 and 21 September 1997. The tournament was held in Canada, which was seen as perfect neutral territory for India and Pakistan to play each other. The tournament was won by India 4–1. The matches were played in white clothing and a red ball was used.

== Teams ==
- Canada - warm-up match only
- India
- Pakistan

== Squads ==
India	Pakistan
Sachin Tendulkar (C); Mohammad Azharuddin; Rajesh Chauhan; Rahul Dravid; Sourav Ganguly; Harvinder Singh; Ajay Jadeja; Vinod Kambli; Saba Karim (Wk); Nilesh Kulkarni; Abey Kuruvilla; Debasis Mohanty; Robin Singh	Rameez Raja (C); Aaqib Javed; Azhar Mahmood; Hasan Raza; Inzamam-ul-Haq; Kabir Khan; Mohammad Akram; Mohammad Hussain; Moin Khan (Wk); Saeed Anwar; Saleem Malik; Saqlain Mushtaq; Shahid Afridi; Shahid Nazir

== Warm-up match ==
11 September
Scorecard

Canada; 171/6 (35 overs)	v	India; 176/4 (34 overs)
George Codrington 101 (97); Debasis Mohanty 2/5 (5 overs)		Robin Singh 57* (52); Barry Seebaran 3/23 (7 overs)

India won by 6 wickets
Ajax Cricket Club, Ajax
Umpires: Nizam Baksh, Colin Harvey and Ken Patel

- India won the toss and elected to field.
- The match was reduced to 35 overs per side due to rain.

== ODI series ==
=== 1st ODI ===
13 September
Scorecard

India; 208 (50 overs)	v	Pakistan; 188 (44.2 overs)
Mohammad Azharuddin 52 (87); Saqlain Mushtaq 5/45 (10 overs)		Saleem Malik 64 (87); Harvinder Singh 3/44 (8.2 overs)

India won by 20 runs
Toronto Cricket, Skating and Curling Club, Toronto
Umpires: Steve Bucknor (WI) and Rudi Koertzen (SA)
Player of the match: Ajay Jadeja (Ind)

- Pakistan won the toss and elected to field.
- Pakistan innings limited to 49 overs due to their slow over rate.
- Harvinder Singh and Debashish Mohanty (Ind) made their ODI debuts.
- Mohammad Azharuddin equalled the record for most catches by an India fieldsman (4).

=== 2nd ODI ===
14 September
Scorecard

Pakistan; 116 (45 overs)	v	India; 119/3 (34.4 overs)
Saleem Malik 36 (58); Debasis Mohanty 3/15 (7 overs)		Sourav Ganguly 32 (86); Saqlain Mushtaq 1/24 (8 overs)

India won by 7 wickets
Toronto Cricket, Skating and Curling Club, Toronto
Umpires: Steve Bucknor (WI) and Steve Randell (Aus)
Player of the match: Sourav Ganguly (Ind)

- Pakistan won the toss and elected to bat.
- Crowd trouble and Inzamam-ul-Haq's (Pak) scuffle with the crowd delayed play by 40 minutes after 16th over of India's innings.

=== 3rd ODI ===
17 September
Scorecard

Pakistan; 169/3 (31.5 overs)	v	India
Saeed Anwar 74 (84); Sourav Ganguly 2/39 (7.5 overs)

No result
Toronto Cricket, Skating and Curling Club, Toronto
Umpires: Rudi Koertzen (SA) and Steve Randell (Aus)

- India won the toss and elected to field.
- Rain reduced Pakistan innings to 31.5 overs and India's target was set to 141 runs in 25 overs by Parabola method.
- Subsequent rain led to abandoning of the match and called for a replay.

==== Replay ====
18 September
Scorecard

India; 182/6 (50 overs)	v	Pakistan; 148 (36.5 overs)
Mohammad Azharuddin 67 (110); Mohammad Akram 2/28 (10 overs)		Shahid Afridi 44 (38); Sourav Ganguly 5/16 (10 overs)

India won by 34 runs
Toronto Cricket, Skating and Curling Club, Toronto
Umpires: Rudi Koertzen (SA) and Steve Randell (Aus)
Player of the match: Sourav Ganguly (Ind)

- Pakistan won the toss and elected to field.

=== 4th ODI ===
20 September
Scorecard

Pakistan; 159/6 (28 overs)	v	India; 162/3 (25.3 overs)
Azhar Mahmood 33* (24); Harvinder Singh 2/25 (5 overs)		Sourav Ganguly 75* (75); Shahid Nazir 3/38 (6 overs)

India won by 7 wickets
Toronto Cricket, Skating and Curling Club, Toronto
Umpires: Steve Bucknor (WI) and Steve Randell (Aus)
Player of the match: Sourav Ganguly (Ind)

- India won the toss and elected to field.
- The match was reduced to 28 overs per side due to rain; India innings limited to 26 overs due to their slow over rate.

=== 5th ODI ===
21 September
Scorecard

India; 250/5 (50 overs)	v	Pakistan; 251/5 (41.5 overs)
Sourav Ganguly 96 (136); Azhar Mahmood 2/27 (10 overs)		Inzamam-ul-Haq 71* (86); Sourav Ganguly 2/33 (9 overs)

Pakistan won by 5 wickets
Toronto Cricket, Skating and Curling Club, Toronto
Umpires: Rudi Koertzen (WI) and Steve Randell (Aus)
Player of the match: Sourav Ganguly (Ind)

- Pakistan won the toss and elected to field.
- Pakistan innings limited to 48 overs due to slow over rate.

== Statistics ==
Most runs		Most wickets	
(India) Sourav Ganguly	222	(India) Sourav Ganguly	15
(India) Mohammad Azharuddin	197	(India) Harvinder Singh	9
(Pakistan) Shahid Afridi	145	(Pakistan) Saqlain Mushtaq	8
(Pakistan) Saeed Anwar	140	(India) Debasis Mohanty	8
(Pakistan) Saleem Malik	132	(India) Abey Kuruvilla	7

== Spectator incident ==
During the 2nd ODI, spectator Shiv Kumar Thind, an Indian living in Toronto, used a megaphone to shout abuse at Pakistan batsman Inzamam-ul-Haq. Thind likened Inzamam's physical size to that of several kinds of potato and Buddha (an old man). Inzamam took offense to this and proceeded to enter the crowd and challenge Thind. When Thind threw his megaphone at him, ul-Haq borrowed a cricket bat from a teammate and attempted to attack Thind with it. The event subsequently caused a 37-minute delay in the game and later resulted in both men filing charges of assault against one another. Thind and ul-Haq later withdrew the charges, although the Pakistan Cricket Board banned Inzamam for two matches.
