= PACE =

PACE may refer to:

== Education ==
- P A College of Engineering, a technical and management institute in India
- Packets of Accelerated Christian Education, a series of workbooks on which the Accelerated Christian Education curriculum is based
- Professional Acknowledgment for Continuing Education, a continuing education credit

== Government and law ==
- Parliamentary Assembly of the Council of Europe, an international parliamentary assembly
- PACE financing (property assessed clean energy financing), a form of municipal financing
- PACE programme, for accelerated prosecution of European patent applications
- Police and Criminal Evidence Act 1984, for policing in England and Wales
- Police and Criminal Evidence (Northern Ireland) Order 1989, for policing in Northern Ireland
- Purchase of Agricultural Conservation Easement, a US state-run program concerning the purchases of conservation easements

== Organizations ==
- Paper, Allied-Industrial, Chemical and Energy Workers International Union, representing workers in the U.S. and Canada
- Parliamentary Assembly of the Council of Europe, the parliamentary arm of the Council of Europe
- Partnership for Academic Competition Excellence, a nonprofit organization that runs the National Scholastics Championship
- Project for Advice, Counselling and Education, a London-based charity promoting the health and well-being of lesbians and gay men

== Science and technology ==
- PACE Award, awarded by Automotive News for breakthrough technologies by automotive suppliers
- National Semiconductor PACE (processing and control element), the first commercial single-chip 16-bit microprocessor
- Plankton, Aerosol, Cloud, ocean Ecosystem, a NASA Earth observing satellite launched in 2024
- Phage-assisted continuous evolution, a protein engineering technique
- Password Authenticated Connection Establishment, a smartcard security protocol

=== Medicine ===
- Pacing and Clinical Electrophysiology, a peer-reviewed medical journal
- Furin or paired basic amino acid cleaving enzyme, a protein in humans
- Program of All-Inclusive Care for the Elderly, in the US
- PACE trial (progressively accelerating cardiopulmonary exertion), a controversial study on the effectiveness of different treatments for myalgic encephalomyelitis/chronic fatigue syndrome

== Other uses ==
- Central Airport (ICAO code: PACE), in Alaska, US
- PACE (communication methodology) (primary, alternate, contingency, and emergency), a communication plan framework
- PACE, a band fronted by singer Adonxs
- Planta Automotiva do Ceará, an automotive assembly plant for General Motors do Brasil

== See also ==
- Pace (disambiguation)
