= Pace =

Pace or paces may refer to:

== Business ==
- Pace Suburban Bus, a bus operator in the suburbs of Chicago, US
- Pace Airlines, an American charter airline
- Pace Foods, a maker of a popular brand of salsa sold in North America, owned by Campbell Soup Company
- Pace Membership Warehouse, a defunct American retail chain
- Pace plc, a British electronics company
- Pace Savings & Credit Union, a Canadian credit union
- Pace Shopping Mall, a series of shopping mall complexes in Pakistan

== Education in the United States ==
- Pace University, New York
- Pace University High School, New York
- Pace Academy, a private secondary school in Atlanta, Georgia
- Monsignor Edward Pace High School, a Catholic high school in Miami Gardens, Florida

== People ==
- Pace (surname), shared by various people
- Paces (musician) from Australia

== Places ==
- Pace, Florida, a census-designated place, United States
- Pace, Mississippi, a town, United States
- Paces, Virginia, an unincorporated community, United States
- Pace, Podlaskie Voivodeship, Poland
- Pace Settlement, Nova Scotia, Canada

== Sports ==
- The speed and power imparted on a ball in sports such as:
  - Pace (pickleball)
  - Pace (tennis)
- Pace (running), a runner's speed measured in time over distance
- Pace car in auto racing

== Units of measure ==
- Pace (unit), roughly equal to 2.5 to 5 feet (0.76 to 1.52 m)
- Byzantine pace (βήμα, bḗma) and double pace, equal to 2.5 and 5 Greek feet
- Roman pace (passus), equal to 5 Roman feet
- Welsh pace (cam), equal to 3 Welsh feet

== Other uses ==
- Pace (horse gait), a specific gait with two beats, where each lateral pair of legs moves forward at the same time
- pace (Latin) ("with peace"), an editor's mark or scholarly notation used to indicate disagreement with a source
- Pace (narrative), the speed at which a story is told
- Parliamentary Assembly of the Council of Europe, the parliamentary arm of the Council of Europe
- Peace flag, often emblazoned with the Italian word PACE

== See also ==
- PACE (disambiguation)
- Pacé (disambiguation)
- Pacer (disambiguation)
- Pacemaker (disambiguation)
- Pacing (disambiguation)
- Rhythm (disambiguation)
- Tempo (disambiguation)
