= Pacé =

Pacé may refer to:

- Pacé, Ille-et-Vilaine, in Brittany, France
- Pacé, Orne, in Normandy, France
- Bertrand Pacé (born 1961), French racing sailor

== See also ==
- Pace (disambiguation)
