= Pacing =

Pacing may refer to:

== In sport ==
- Pacing, an athletic technique of spreading one's effort out over longer-distance track and field races (also in swimming)
- Pacing (horse gait), a horse gait
- Motor-paced racing, bicycling behind a car or motorcycle to profit from the slipstream

== In medicine ==
- Pacing, an example of psychomotor agitation where a person walks around a room because of mental stress or anxiety
- Pacing (activity management), used to manage symptoms of chronic fatigue syndrome
- Cardiac pacing, regulation of the heart rate, generally in the sense of artificial methods:
  - Artificial pacemaker, a medical device
  - Transcutaneous pacing, a means of making the heart beat during a medical emergency

== Other uses ==
- Pacing (surveying), a means of estimating distances by counting the number of paces taken to walk a traverse
- Pacing, a technique in hypnosis and neuro-linguistic programming
- Pacing (narrative), the speed at which a story is told

== See also ==
- Pace (disambiguation)
