= List of international cricket centuries by Inzamam-ul-Haq =

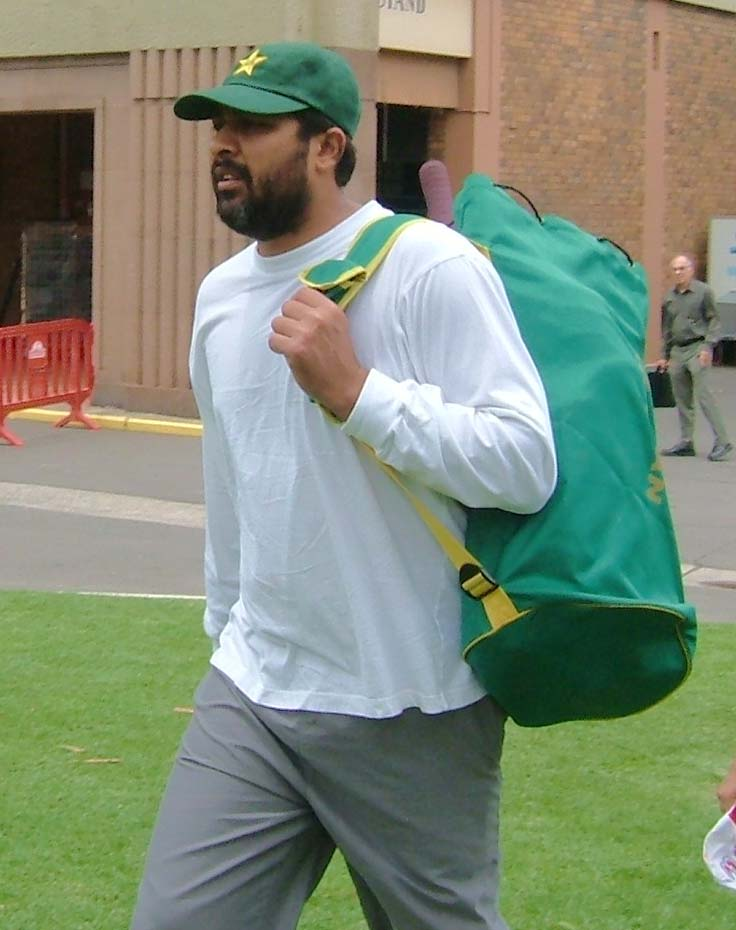
Inzamam-ul-Haq held the record for most centuries in Tests for Pakistan till 2014.

Inzamam-ul-Haq is a retired Pakistani cricketer, and a former captain of the Pakistan national cricket team. He scored centuries (100 or more runs in an innings) in Test matches and One Day International (ODI) matches on 25 and 10 occasions respectively during his international career. Inzamam played 120 Test matches for Pakistan and scored 8,820 runs. He is the third-highest run scorer for Pakistan in Test cricket, after Younis Khan and Javed Miandad. He was described by the BBC as "one of the most recognisable figures in cricket" and "one of the finest batsmen around", while former Pakistan captain Imran Khan said that he was "as talented as Brian Lara and Sachin Tendulkar".

Inzamam made his Test debut against England at Edgbaston, Birmingham, in June 1992. His first Test century came a year later against the West Indies at Antigua Recreation Ground, St John's, Antigua. His score of 329, against New Zealand at the Gaddafi Stadium, Lahore, in May 2002, is the second-highest total by a Pakistan batsman in Test cricket and the fifteenth-highest overall. He also scored a century in his 100th Test match, becoming only the fifth player to do so. (Note: The four previous players to achieve this feat were Colin Cowdrey, Miandad, Gordon Greenidge and Alec Stewart. This feat was also achieved later by Ricky Ponting and Graeme Smith.) Inzamam made a century in each innings of the second Test match of England's tour of Pakistan in 2005–06, to become Pakistan's leading century-maker with 24 centuries, breaking Miandad's record. (Note: Inzamam became one of the fifth Pakistani after Hanif Mohammad, Miandad, Wajahatullah Wasti and Yasir Hameed to score centuries in both innings of a Test match. This feat was also achieved later by two more Pakistanis, Mohammad Yousuf and Younus Khan.) His 119 against India during the second Test of the home series in January 2006 made him the tenth player to score 25 or more centuries in Test cricket. Inzamam scored Test centuries at 18 cricket grounds, including 13 at venues outside Pakistan. As of January 2019, he is joint twentieth (with Virat Kohli) among players with most hundreds in Test cricket.

Having made his ODI debut in November 1991 against the West Indies at the Gaddafi Stadium, Inzamam achieved his first ODI century a year later against Sri Lanka at the Multan Cricket Stadium. In ODI matches, Inzamam is fifth in the all-time list of highest-run scorers, with 11,739 runs from 378 matches, though he has the fewest centuries of the top ten players on that list. His highest ODI score of 137 not out came against New Zealand at the Sharjah Cricket Association Stadium, in 1994. Inzamam played his only Twenty 20 International match against England at the County Cricket Ground, Bristol, during the 2006 series between the two teams. He never scored a century in the format. As of January 2019, he ranks joint twenty-fifth among players with most hundreds in international cricket. (Note: Inzamam shares the position with Sunil Gavaskar, Viv Richards, Desmond Haynes, Steve Waugh, Herschelle Gibbs and David Warner.)

== Key ==
Symbol	Meaning
*	Remained not out
†	Man of the match
‡	Captained the Pakistan cricket team
Balls	Balls faced
Pos.	Position in the batting order
Inn.	The innings of the match
S/R	Strike rate during the innings
H/A/N	Venue was at home (Pakistan), away or neutral
Date	Match starting day
Lost	The match was lost by Pakistan
Won	The match was won by Pakistan
Drawn	The match was drawn

== Test cricket centuries ==
List of Test centuries
No.	Score	Balls	Against	Pos.	Inn.	S/R	Venue	H/A/N	Date	Result	Ref
1	123	225	West Indies	6	2	54.66	Antigua Recreation Ground, St John's, Antigua	Away	1 May 1993	Drawn	
2	135*	195	New Zealand	6	2	69.23	Basin Reserve, Wellington	Away	17 February 1994	Won	
3	100*	125	Sri Lanka	7	2	80.00	Asgiriya Stadium, Kandy	Away	26 August 1994	Won	
4	101 †	168	Zimbabwe	6	1	60.11	Harare Sports Club, Harare	Away	15 February 1995	Won	
5	148	218	England	4	1	67.88	Lord's Cricket Ground, London	Away	25 July 1996	Won	
6	177 †	320	West Indies	4	2	55.31	Rawalpindi Cricket Stadium, Rawalpindi	Home	29 November 1997	Won	
7	200*	397	Sri Lanka	4	2	50.37	Bangabandhu National Stadium, Dhaka	Neutral	12 March 1999	Won	
8	118	191	Australia	5	3	61.78	Bellerive Oval, Hobart	Away	18 November 1999	Lost	
9	138 †	243	Sri Lanka	4	3	56.79	National Stadium, Karachi	Home	12 March 2000	Won	
10	135 †	254	West Indies	4	1	53.14	Bourda, Georgetown, Guyana	Away	5 May 2000	Drawn	
11	112	163	Sri Lanka	5	2	68.71	Galle International Stadium, Galle	Away	21 June 2000	Won	
12	142	257	England	4	1	55.25	National Stadium, Karachi	Home	7 December 2000	Lost	
13	130	241	New Zealand	4	2	53.94	Jade Stadium, Christchurch	Away	15 March 2001	Drawn	
14	114 †	153	England	4	1	74.50	Old Trafford, Manchester	Away	31 May 2001	Won	
15	105*	163	Bangladesh	4	2	64.41	Multan Cricket Stadium, Multan	Home	29 August 2001	Won	
16	329 †	436	New Zealand	4	1	75.45	Gaddafi Stadium, Lahore	Home	1 May 2002	Won	
17	112	109	Zimbabwe	4	3	104.67	Harare Sports Club, Harare	Away	9 November 2002	Won	
18	138* †	232	Bangladesh	4	4	59.48	Multan Cricket Stadium, Multan	Home	3 September 2003	Won	
19	118 ‡	243	India	4	2	48.55	Gaddafi Stadium, Lahore	Home	5 April 2004	Won	
20	117 ‡	244	Sri Lanka	4	2	47.95	National Stadium, Karachi	Home	28 October 2004	Won	
21	184 ‡	264	India	4	1	69.69	M. Chinnaswamy Stadium, Bangalore	Away	24 March 2005	Won	
22	117* ‡	194	West Indies	5	3	60.30	Sabina Park, Kingston, Jamaica	Away	3 June 2005	Won	
23	109 † ‡	200	England	5	1	54.50	Iqbal Stadium, Faisalabad	Home	20 November 2005	Drawn	
24	100* † ‡	134	England	5	3	74.62	Iqbal Stadium, Faisalabad	Home	20 November 2005	Drawn	
25	119‡	193	India	5	1	61.65	Iqbal Stadium, Faisalabad	Home	21 January 2006	Drawn	

== ODI centuries ==
List of ODI centuries
No.	Score	Balls	Against	Pos.	Inn.	S/R	Venue	H/A/N	Date	Result	Ref
1	101 †	121	Sri Lanka	2	1	83.47	Multan Cricket Stadium, Multan	Home	17 January 1992	Lost	
2	117 †	103	Sri Lanka	2	1	113.59	Rawalpindi Cricket Stadium, Rawalpindi	Home	19 January 1992	Won	
3	137* †	129	New Zealand	3	1	106.20	Sharjah Cricket Association Stadium, Sharjah	Neutral	20 April 1994	Won	
4	116* †	138	Zimbabwe	3	2	84.05	Harare Sports Club, Harare	Away	25 February 1995	Won	
5	116* †	110	Sri Lanka	4	2	105.45	Kimberley Country Club, Kimberley	Neutral	7 April 1998	Won	
6	107 †	115	India	4	1	93.04	Sharjah Cricket Association Stadium, Sharjah	Neutral	8 April 1999	Won	
7	121* †	113	India	4	1	107.07	Sharjah Cricket Association Stadium, Sharjah	Neutral	26 March 2000	Won	
8	118*	124	Sri Lanka	4	2	95.16	Sharjah Cricket Association Stadium, Sharjah	Neutral	2 November 2001	Won	
9	122 † ‡	102	India	4	2	119.60	National Stadium, Karachi	Home	13 March 2004	Lost	
10	123 † ‡	121	India	4	1	101.65	Gaddafi Stadium, Lahore	Home	21 March 2004	Lost	
