= Pacer =

Pacer, PACER or Pacers may refer to:

== Arts, entertainment, and media ==
- Pacer (album), an album by The Amps
- "Pacer", a song by the Smashing Pumpkins from Atum: A Rock Opera in Three Acts, 2023
- "Pacer" a song by Doechii, 2024
- Pacer (video game), a 2020 racing game
- Pacers, a band formed by Sonny Burgess

== Brands and enterprises ==
- Pacers (confection), brand of mint-flavored confection
- Kramer Pacer guitars, 1980s

== Sports ==
- Pacer (dinghy), formerly Puffin Pacer
- Pacer, a horse that uses the pace gait, including:
  - Canadian Pacer
  - Narragansett Pacer
  - Standardbred
- Pacer, a fast bowler in cricket
- Derny, a pacing bicycle
- Indiana Pacers, a US basketball team
- Progressive Aerobic Cardiovascular Endurance Run or multi-stage fitness test
- Pace car, in car racing
- Pacer (running), a support runner in ultramarathons
- Pacemaker (running), athlete setting the pace for first section of a race
- Pacer a gait in harness racing
- USC Aiken Pacers, the athletic teams that represent the University of South Carolina Aiken
- UNZA Pacers, a Zambian basketball team

== Transportation ==
- Pacer (British Rail), a type of passenger railbus, used in the United Kingdom and the Middle East
- AMC Pacer, an American car produced by the American Motors Corporation
- Edsel Pacer, an American car produced by Ford
- Pacer International, a transportation logistic provider and the parent company of Pacer Stracktrain
  - Pacer Stacktrain, a United States intermodal (container) freight transportation services company
- Piper PA-20 Pacer, a light airplane produced by Piper Aircraft
  - PA-22 Tri-Pacer, a tricycle gear variant of the PA-20 Pacer

== Other uses ==
- PACER (fusion), 1970s nuclear power project at Los Alamos National Laboratory in the United States
- PACER (law), a United States government legal documentation system standing for Public Access to Court Electronic Records
- Pacific Agreement on Closer Economic Relations, international trade cooperation agreement

== See also ==
- Pace (disambiguation)
