= PACE (communication methodology) =

Primary, alternate, contingency and emergency (PACE) is a methodology used to build a communication plan. The method requires the author to determine the different stakeholders or parties that need to communicate and then determine, if possible, the best four, different, redundant forms of communication between each of those parties. Ideally, each method will be completely separate and independent of the other systems of communication; failure of any component/process in one should not affect any other means to communicate.

PACE also defines the priority of communications systems. According to the United States Army, a PACE communication plan "designates the order in which an element will move through available communications systems until contact can be established with the desired distant element.". Agreed upon triggers inform parties when to move to another form. For each method, the receiver must first sense which one the sender is using and then respond, thus monitoring of more than one means is required.

A PACE-based communication plan exists for a specific mission or task, not a specific unit, because the plan must consider both intra- and inter-unit sharing of information. An organization may have multiple plans for different situations, activities, and/or partners.

== Order and scope ==
The PACE plan system is expressed as an order of communication precedence list;

- primary,
- alternate,
- contingency, and
- emergency.

The first is usually the best, more reliable, most used, fastest, and highest bandwidth of the options. The last is usually the most time-consuming, costly, and inconvenient. For example, the plan does not designate such things as the exact radio channel or talk group to be used if you are using a radio, but the order in which you would plan to use the radio, then telephone, then email, then courier, and/or whatever agreed upon method of communications between groups.

A PACE plan is not a frequency plan (which details frequency allocation and radio spectrum characteristics) or band plan (to avoid interference) or channel plan (which details which channels users listen/talk upon) or deployment plan (which details the users' radios types and locations).

== Development of PACE plans ==
Developing a PACE plan is a collaborative effort balancing operational needs and communications options. It must consider users, technology, security/privacy risks, time, quality, training/practice, and cost.

Emergency management and communications managers should coordinate the development of PACE plans for the many different functions and departments within your organization to ensure that Incident Command can maintain critical communication links. Departmental PACE plans should be coordinated with emergency management and the communications team. It is critical that individual departments nest their plan within the larger Emergency Plan to ensure that the organization has the resources to execute the plan and reduce unnecessary duplication of assets. Developing comprehensive PACE plans will not ensure perfect communications in a disaster, but may help to clear one more layer in the fog and friction found in every emergency situation.
