= Shariful Haque =

Bangladeshi cricketer (born 1976)

Cricket information
- Batting: Right-handed
- Bowling: Right-arm offbreak

International information
- National side: Bangladesh
- Only ODI (cap 40): 10 January 1998 v India
- Source: ESPNcricinfo, 13 February 2006

Shariful Haque (born 15 January 1976) is a former Bangladeshi cricketer who played one One Day International in 1998.

His career ended when the Bangladesh Cricket Board (BCB) imposed an indefinite ban on him in 2012 after he was found guilty of spot-fixing in a Bangladesh Premier League match. The Dhaka Gladiators captain Mashrafe Mortaza had earlier reported to his team management a spot-fixing approach by a cricketer.
