= James Henderson (cricketer, born 1975) =

South African cricketer (born 1975)

Personal information
- Born: 6 August 1975 (age 51); Worcester, South Africa
- Source: Cricinfo, 1 December 2020

James Henderson (born 6 August 1975) is a South African former cricketer. He played in 64 first-class and 42 List A matches from 1994 to 2005.

== See also ==
- List of Boland representative cricketers
