= Kosie Venter =

South African cricketer

Personal information
- Full name: Jacobus Francois Venter
- Born: 1 October 1969 (age 57); Bloemfontein, Orange Free State, South Africa
- Batting: Left-handed
- Bowling: Right-arm off break
- Relatives: Everhardus Venter (brother)

Domestic team information
- Years: Team
- 1989/90–2003/04: Orange Free State/Free State
- 1990/91: Transvaal B
- 1999: Worcestershire Cricket Board

Career statistics
Competition	First-class	List A
Matches	108	100
Runs scored	5,066	2,459
Batting average	30.15	29.27
100s/50s	5/32	1/13
Top score	193	118*
Balls bowled	15,769	2,752
Wickets	241	71
Bowling average	33.00	29.70
5 wickets in innings	0	1
10 wickets in match	0	0
Best bowling	7/83	5/21
Catches/stumpings	60/–	36/–
- Source: Cricinfo, 5 February 2011

Jacobus "Kosie" Francois Venter (born 1 October 1969) is a former South African cricketer. Venter was a left-handed batsman who bowled right-arm off break. He was born at Bloemfontein, Orange Free State.

In a professional career that lasted from the 1989/90 to the 2003/04 South African cricket seasons, Venter played both the first-class and List A formats of the game with no fewer than six different sides. Debuting in the 1989/90 season for Orange Free State, he proceeded to play first-class and List A cricket for Orange Free State, Transvaal B and Free State. He later played List A cricket in England for the Marylebone Cricket Club in 1996 and the Worcestershire Cricket Board in the 1999 NatWest Trophy. Venter also played Second XI cricket in England for the Leicestershire Second XI in 1994.

In his first-class career, he played 108 times scoring 5,066 runs at a batting average of 30.15, with five centuries and thirty-two half centuries and making a high score of 193. An all rounder, Venter took 241 wickets at a bowling average of 33.00, with eight five wicket hauls and best figures of 7/83. An able fielder, he took 60 catches. Venter played nearly an equal number of List A matches, playing exactly 100. In these he scored 2,459 runs at an average of 29.27, with a single century score of 118* and thirteen half centuries. With the ball he took 71 wickets at an average 29.70, with a single five wicket haul which gave him best figures of 5/21. In the field he took 36 catches.

His older brother, Everhardus, represented Orange Free State at first-class and List A level.
