= Zakir Hossain (cricketer) =

Cricketer

Personal information
- Full name: Mohammad Zakir Hossain
- Born: 2 January 1977 (age 49); Dhaka, Bangladesh
- Batting: Right handed
- Bowling: Right-arm medium fast
- Role: Bowler

International information
- National side: Bangladesh
- Only ODI (cap 41): 12 January 1998 v Pakistan

Career statistics
Competition	ODI	FC	LA
Matches	1	2	7
Runs scored	0	2	19
Batting average	0.00	2	9.50
100s/50s	0/0	0/0	0/0
Top score	0	2	13
Balls bowled	24	135	305
Wickets	0	2	4
Bowling average	–	19.50	58.50
5 wickets in innings	–	0	0
10 wickets in match	–	0	0
Best bowling	–	1/7	2/50
Catches/stumpings	0/–	2/–	0/–
- Source: ESPNCricinfo, 7 February 2018

Mohammad Zakir Hossain is a former One Day International cricketer from Bangladesh. He played his only ODI against Pakistan on 12 January 1998. He was a first-class and List A cricketer from Bangladesh. He is a right-handed batsman and right arm medium fast bowler. He played two times in Bangladesh National Cricket League for Chittagong Division in 2000–01 and for Khulna Division in 2004–05.
