= Fazl-e-Akbar =

Pakistani cricketer (born 1980)

Personal information
- Full name: Fazl-e-Akbar Durrani
- Born: 20 October 1980 (age 46); Peshawar, Pakistan
- Batting: Right-handed
- Bowling: Right-arm fast-medium

International information
- National side: Pakistan
- Test debut (cap 151): 26 February 1998 v South Africa
- Last Test: 13 April 2004 v India
- ODI debut (cap 121): 11 January 1998 v India
- Last ODI: 17 June 2001 v England

Domestic team information
- Years: Team
- 1996–2007: Peshawar
- 1997: Agriculture Development Bank
- 1998–2000: Pakistan Customs
- 1999: Pakistan Reserves
- 2001–2009: Pakistan International Airlines
- 2002–2008: North West Frontier Province
- 2006–2008: Peshawar Panthers

Career statistics
Competition	Test	ODI	FC
Matches	5	2	136
Runs scored	52	7	846
Batting average	13.00	7.00	8.72
100s/50s	0/0	0/0	0/0
Top score	25	7	32*
Balls bowled	882	72	23,356
Wickets	11	0	600
Bowling average	46.45	–	21.31
5 wickets in innings	0	–	37
10 wickets in match	0	–	7
Best bowling	3/85	–	9/116
Catches/stumpings	2/–	0/–	27/–
- Source: ESPNcricinfo, 17 December 2017

Fazl-e-Akbar Durrani (born 20 October 1980) is a Pakistani cricketer. He is a right-handed batsman and a right-arm medium-fast bowler.

Fazl made his Test debut in February 1998 in a match between South Africa and Pakistan. He had an early impact, taking his first Test wicket, that of Gary Kirsten, with his sixth ball after having earlier dropped a catch from him. He managed to only play four more Tests, his last in 2004. He continued to play domestic cricket in Pakistan until 2009.
