= Manzoor Akhtar =

Pakistani cricketer (born 1968)

Cricket information
- Batting: Right-handed
- Bowling: Legbreak

Career statistics
Competition	ODI
Matches	7
Runs scored	97
Batting average	24.25
100s/50s	0/0
Top score	44
Balls bowled	199
Wickets	5
Bowling average	36.79
5 wickets in innings	0
10 wickets in match	0
Best bowling	4/50
Catches/stumpings	1/-
- Source: , 3 May 2006

Manzoor Akhtar (born 16 April 1968) is a former Pakistani cricketer who played seven One Day Internationals between 1997 and 1998. He was born at Karachi.
