= Sajeewa de Silva =

Sri Lankan cricketer (born 1971)

Personal information
- Full name: Karunakalage Sajeewa Chanaka de Silva
- Born: 11 January 1971 (age 55); Kalutara, Sri Lanka
- Batting: Left-handed
- Bowling: Left-arm fast-medium
- Role: Bowler

International information
- National side: Sri Lanka (1996–2000)
- Test debut (cap 67): 14 March 1997 v New Zealand
- Last Test: 12 March 1999 v Pakistan
- ODI debut (cap 88): 28 September 1996 v Kenya
- Last ODI: 5 June 2000 v Pakistan

Career statistics
Competition	Test	ODI	FC	LA
Matches	8	38	111	74
Runs scored	65	39	1,099	170
Batting average	9.28	6.50	11.94	8.50
100s/50s	0/0	0/0	0/2	0/0
Top score	27	13*	74	35
Balls bowled	1,585	1,619	15,412	2,859
Wickets	16	52	346	78
Bowling average	55.56	25.44	22.93	27.78
5 wickets in innings	1	0	19	0
10 wickets in match	0	0	2	0
Best bowling	5/85	3/18	7/73	3/18
Catches/stumpings	5/–	12/–	58/–	23/–
- Source: Cricinfo, 21 January 2015

Karunakalage Sajeewa Chanaka de Silva (born 11 January 1971) is a former Sri Lankan cricketer. A left-arm fast-medium bowler, he played eight Test matches and 38 One Day Internationals for Sri Lanka between 1996 and 2000. He made his Twenty20 debut on 17 August 2004, for Burgher Recreation Club in the 2004 SLC Twenty20 Tournament.

== Trivia ==
Sajeewa de Silva along with Russel Arnold set the record for the highest 10th wicket runstand for Sri Lanka in ODI cricket with 51 runs.
