= Mohammad Wasim (coach) =

Pakistani cricketer (born 1978)

Personal information
- Full name: Mohammad Wasim
- Born: 8 August 1978 (age 48); Rawalpindi, Punjab, Pakistan
- Batting: Right-handed
- Bowling: Legbreak googly

International information
- National side: Pakistan
- Test debut (cap 142): 21 November 1996 v New Zealand
- Last Test: 21 June 2000 v Sri Lanka
- ODI debut (cap 114): 8 December 1996 v New Zealand
- Last ODI: 5 June 2000 v Sri Lanka

Career statistics
Competition	Test	ODI
Matches	18	25
Runs scored	783	543
Batting average	30.11	23.60
100s/50s	2/2	0/3
Top score	192	76
Catches/stumpings	22/2	9/–
- Source: ESPNCricinfo, 4 February 2017

Mohammad Wasim (Urdu: محمد وسیم; born 8 August 1978) is a Punjabi Pakistani cricket coach and cricketer who played for both the Pakistan and Dutch cricket teams. He played in 18 Test matches and 25 One Day Internationals from 1996 to 2000 for the Pakistan national cricket team.

== Personal life ==
As of February 2017, Wasim was living in Islamabad, where he worked as a television expert on cricket and runs a cricket academy.

== Cricket career ==
Wasim scored two Test centuries for Pakistan including one on Test debut. His debut came against New Zealand in 1996, after scoring a duck in the first innings he went on to record 109 in the second innings batting at number 7. He gradually moved up the order in subsequent Tests eventually to open the innings for Pakistan in Tests. His second test ton came against Zimbabwe, scoring 192 in Harare, 1998.

Wasim's most prominent experience in a Pakistani shirt came in Pakistan winning the Carlton and United Series in Australia against perhaps the two other most powerful teams in world cricket at the time, West Indies and hosts Australia. The series was low scoring and Wasim contributed significantly batting at number six.

His final Test appearance was in 2000 against Sri Lanka. After being discarded he was never recalled and when Pakistan decided upon a new set of youngsters in preparation for the 2003 World Cup.

In 2002/03 season, Wasim moved to play first-class cricket for Otago in New Zealand. After two seasons he left Otago and continued to play in Pakistan.

In July 2014, Wasim played a 50-over game for the Netherlands against Scotland, after he acquired Dutch nationality after living in the country for several years – playing his cricket for Sparta 1888 and Dosti Amsterdam. Wasim was a regular for the North Holland Hurricanes in the North Sea Pro Series that season and also turned out for Netherlands A in the Continental T20 Championship in Schiedam.

== Post-retirement ==
=== Coaching career ===
In May 2018, Wasim was appointed head coach of the Sweden national cricket team. He assisted the team in its preparation for the 2018–19 ICC World Twenty20 Europe Qualifier. Wasim was head coach of the Pakistan women's team from June 2024 until November 2025.

=== Cricket administration ===
in December 2020, Wasim was appointed as chief selector for the Pakistan Cricket Board (PCB). He was sacked from the position in December 2022.
