= Rashid Latif =

Pakistani cricketer

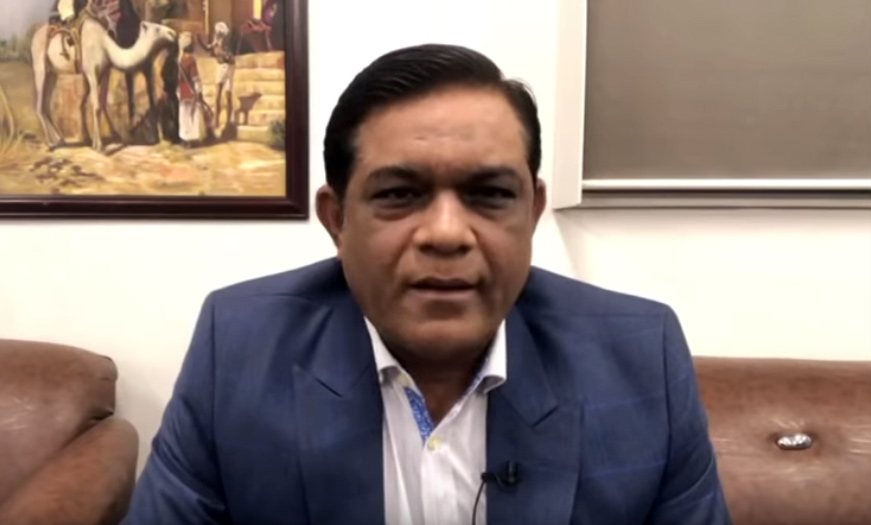
- Latif in 2020

Personal information
- Born: 14 October 1968 (age 58); Karachi, Sindh, Pakistan
- Height: 5 ft 8 in (173 cm)
- Batting: Right-handed
- Bowling: Leg-break
- Role: Wicket keeper

International information
- National side: Pakistan (1992–2003)
- Test debut (cap 125): 6 August 1992 v England
- Last Test: 3 September 2003 v Bangladesh
- ODI debut (cap 85): 20 August 1992 v England
- Last ODI: 12 October 2003 v South Africa

Career statistics
Competition	Test	ODI	FC	LA
Matches	37	166	156	249
Runs scored	1,381	1,709	5,094	3,108
Batting average	28.77	19.42	28.30	21.88
100s/50s	1/7	0/3	3/30	1/11
Top score	150	79	150	100
Balls bowled	12	–	244	–
Wickets	0	–	6	–
Bowling average	–	–	28.50	–
5 wickets in innings	–	–	0	–
10 wickets in match	–	–	0	–
Best bowling	–	–	2/17	–
Catches/stumpings	119/11	182/38	429/53	256/63
- Source: ESPN Cricinfo, 28 August 2017

Rashid Latif (born 14 October 1968) is a Pakistani cricket coach and former cricketer who played for the Pakistan national cricket team in Tests and One Day Internationals from 1992 to 2003 as a right-handed wicket-keeper batsman. He also served as the captain of the Pakistan team in 2003, leading the country in 6 Test and 25 one-day matches.

In February 2014, he became the chief selector of Pakistan national cricket team.

== Early life and domestic career ==
Latif was born in Karachi to Abdul Latif Quraishi, who migrated to Pakistan from Uttar Pradesh, India, during the 1950s while Rashid's half-brother, Shahid Latif, remained in India where he worked for a newspaper in Kolkata, West Bengal.

He earned a BSc in computer systems engineering from NED University of Engineering and Technology with Saeed Anwar, where he joined APMSO. In April 2006, Latif retired from first-class cricket as he toured with the Pakistani senior players to play against Indian senior players in April 2006 in a series played between players who have retired from professional cricket. Latif has not participated in domestic first-class cricket since 2005. His last match was in 2006, when he played for Lashings Cricket Club, a club in England.

== International career ==
Latif started playing for the Pakistan national cricket team in 1992 after the 1992 Cricket World Cup. He impressed the national selectors by scoring 50 runs on his Test debut, however it did not cement his place in the national squad as throughout his career he had to compete with another Pakistani wicket-keeper, Moin Khan. Despite having a significantly similar Test batting average, Moin had a higher ODI average than Latif and scored more runs than Latif in international cricket. However, Moin had the wicket keeping record of 2.14 dismissals per test against Latif 3.51 per test. Moreover, in all time Pakistani XI Latif picks as wicket-keeper and hence 69 test matches of Moin is a question mark in Rashid Latif tenure. In 1996, Latif announced his retirement after conflicts with some players and the team management. He returned to the Pakistan team and became the captain of the National side in 1998.

Latif remained out of the national squad until 2001, when after a string of poor performances, the Pakistan team replaced Moin Khan. After returning to the squad, he secured his place by keeping the wicket and giving a string of good batting performances. The highlight of his career came after the 2003 Cricket World Cup, when he was named the captain of the Pakistan team. Under his leadership, Pakistan successfully experimented with several new players and the team gave positive results. He was also involved with uniting the players through his captaincy both on and off the cricket field. However, problems between Latif and the team management again surfaced in 2003–04, which resulted in him giving away the captaincy to former Pakistan batsman Inzamam-ul-Haq. He was omitted from the squad and was never recalled in the team, despite his attempts to get back into the squad during 2003–05.

=== Dropped catch controversy and end of Test career ===
Rashid Latif claimed a catch against Bangladesh batsman Alok Kapali in Multan in 2003. However, replays showed clearly that the catch was dropped and Rashid deliberately claimed a dropped catch. At the time, he maintained his innocence and stated that had he known he had not taken a clean catch, he would have called the batsman back. Mike Procter, the match referee, found Rashid guilty and banned him for five international matches. The game was very close, and Bangladesh lost the game by just one wicket. Rashid Latif later acknowledged that he knowingly and wrongfully claimed that catch. However, he stated that he had no regret over his action.

"I did realize immediately that the ball rolled out of my hand and it touched the ground. I conveyed that to my senior players. I gave an option to recall the batsman but it was decided that we will let him go. But I have no regrets." – Rashid Latif

He never got back in the Pakistan test squad after this incident.

== Coaching career ==
=== Afghan coaching ===
In July 2010, Latif was appointed as the batting coach of the Afghanistan national cricket team. Latif stated that the Afghan players were keen to learn from him. Latif further added that he liked the challenge of coaching the team and helping at the grassroots level of Afghan cricket; in July 2010 he also talked about having a Pakistan-Afghanistan cricket series in late 2010 to help Pakistan return to staging international cricket. As a wicket-keeper, Latif also commented on the form of Pakistani wicket-keeper Kamran Akmal by stating that "Kamran has gained weight for a wicket-keeper, his wicket-keeping has been poor due to that and a lot of workload as a cricketer. I strongly suggest to all wicket-keepers that when they are struggling they take a rest and then comeback to the scene stronger as poor wicket-keeping can destroy your confidence as a batsman." In August 2010, the coach of the Afghan team Kabir Khan announced that he was going to leave his post because of consistent interference by the board. This led to Latif, who was the batting coach at the time, to be named his successor. However, soon after that Latif announced his resignation also, citing consistent interference by the board.

Latif's stint as the Afghan coach got off to a good start when Afghanistan registered a 162-run win over Kenya in the ICC Intercontinental Cup but then lost the first ODI by 92 runs; Kenya were bowled out for 160 but Afghanistan's batting order collapsed for 88. The team took a six-wicket victory during the second ODI as Kenya succumbed to 139 and Afghanistan suffered a poor start with opener Noor Ali retiring hurt and Karim Sadiq being caught. However, Asghar Stanikzai scored his second half-century and along with Mohammad Shahzad, who scored 37, guided the run chase. The finest moment of Latif's coaching career came at the 2010 Asian Games when Afghanistan upset the cricket super-power Pakistan in the semi-final as Afghanistan sealed a comfortable 22-run victory and set up a final tie with Bangladesh. Afghanistan lost the final but celebrated the accomplishment of collecting their first ever Asian Games medal with a second-place silver.

The next assignment of Latif's team was the ICC Intercontinental Cup where Afghanistan played Scotland in the final. Latif stated that Afghanistan liked to play aggressive cricket and the players were mentally very tough and hated to lose. On 2 December, the match against Scotland started and because of Hamid Hassan Scotland were bowled out for 212. More than half of Scotland's runs came from Neil McCallum who scored 104*. Afghanistan got off to a good start but collapsed to 171 all out, giving Scotland a 41-run lead. Despite this, another great bowling performance from Hassan and Samiullah Shenwari meant that Scotland were skittled for just 82 in their second innings. On the third day, Afghanistan sealed victory early in the day with seven wickets in hand, courtesy of a superb 56* by Mohammad Shahzad.

==== Controversy ====
In 2010, Latif responded to the spot-fixing allegations against the Pakistan team by saying that ICC needed to re-design its laws and rules to root out the match-fixing and spot-fixing problem. Latif wrote a letter to the ICC citing his concerns back in 2003. "In that letter, I told them to change the rules and laws in one-day internationals which, were more prone to spot-fixing. I even offered to assist the ICC's Anti-Corruption and Security Unit but I got no response," he said.

"The key is to design laws and rules that do not allow players and bookmakers to manipulate things. I told the ICC remove the fielding restrictions and they introduced the power-play which only encouraged fixing."

Following this statement, Latif resigned as the wicket-keeping coach at the Pakistan National Cricket Academy and subsequently reconciled with the Afghan Cricket Board and returned as the team's coach. He stated that his aim was to help the team get the status to play Test cricket in two years' time. Latif also stated that he believed that a broadcast delay of 30 seconds would help curb fixing.

=== Pakistan Super League ===
He is currently one of the members of the advisory board as well as director of PSL's franchise Karachi Kings.

Preceded by Waqar Younis	Pakistan Cricket Captain; 2003 May- September	Succeeded by Inzamam-ul-Haq

Sporting positions
Preceded by Kabir Khan	Coach of the Afghan national team 2010	Succeeded by Kabir Khan
