= Mohammad Hussain (cricketer) =

Pakistani cricketer (1976–2022)

Personal information
- Born: 8 October 1976; Lahore, Punjab, Pakistan
- Died: 11 April 2022 (aged 45); Lahore, Punjab, Pakistan
- Batting: Left-handed
- Bowling: Slow left-arm orthodox

International information
- National side: Pakistan (1996–1998)
- Test debut (cap 141): 24 October 1996 v Zimbabwe
- Last Test: 1 October 1998 v Australia
- ODI debut (cap 118): 9 May 1997 v New Zealand
- Last ODI: 17 April 1998 v South Africa

Career statistics
Competition	Tests	ODIs
Matches	2	14
Runs scored	18	154
Batting average	6.00	30.80
100s/50s	-/-	-/-
Top score	17	31*
Balls bowled	180	672
Wickets	3	13
Bowling average	29.00	42.07
5 wickets in innings	-	-
10 wickets in match	-	n/a
Best bowling	2/66	4/33
Catches/stumpings	1/-	5/-
- Source: ESPNCricinfo, 4 February 2017

Mohammad Hussain (8 October 1976 – 11 April 2022) was a Pakistani cricketer who played in 2 Tests and 14 ODIs between 1996 and 1998. A left-handed batsman and slow left-arm orthodox spin bowler, he played first-class cricket for a number of teams in Pakistan between 1994 and 2009.

He was involved in the "Toronto incident" with Inzamam-ul-Haq in September 1997, as the 12th man who provided a cricket bat to Inzamam before he attacked a member of the crowd.

At the time of his death, he had been suffering from a kidney-related illness and was on dialysis.
