= Inzamam-ul-Haq =

Pakistani cricketer

Syed Inzamam-ul-Haq, SI
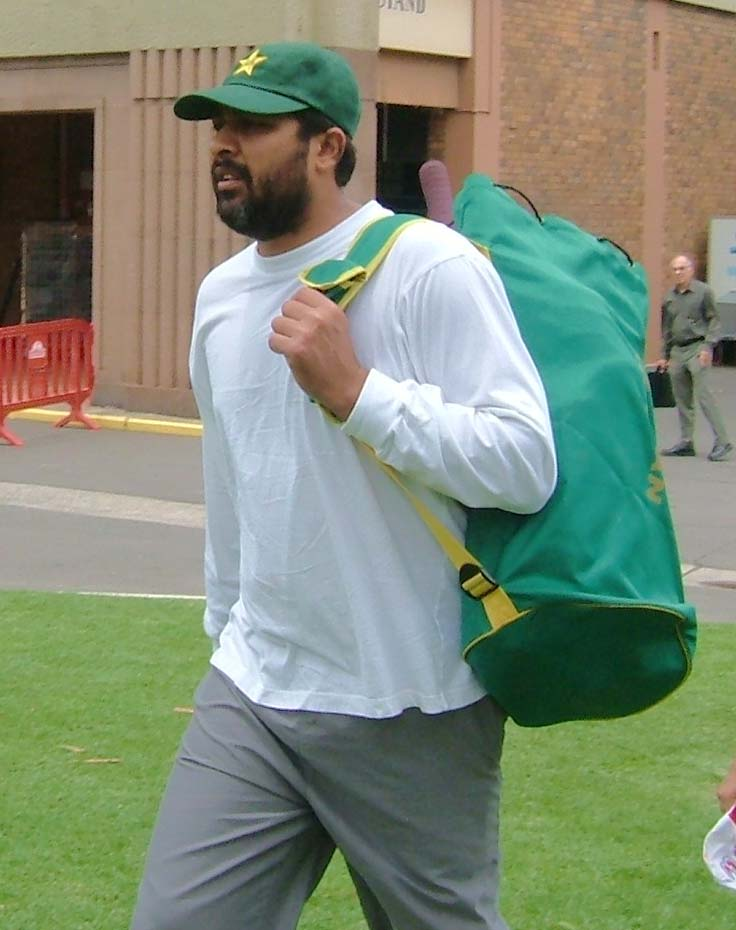
- Inzamam-ul-Haq in 2005

Personal information
- Full name: Syed Inzamam-ul-Haq
- Born: 3 March 1970 (age 56); Multan, Punjab, Pakistan
- Nickname: Inzi; Sultan of Multan
- Height: 6 ft 3 in (191 cm)
- Batting: Right-handed
- Bowling: Slow left-arm orthodox
- Role: Batsman
- Relatives: Javed Ilyas (uncle); Imam-ul-Haq (nephew); Ibtesam-ul-Haq (son)

International information
- National side: Pakistan (1991–2007)
- Test debut (cap 124): 4 June 1992 v England
- Last Test: 5 October 2007 v South Africa
- ODI debut (cap 158): 23 November 1991 v West Indies
- Last ODI: 21 March 2007 v Zimbabwe
- ODI shirt no.: 8
- Only T20I (cap 2): 28 August 2006 v England

Domestic team information
- Years: Team
- 1985/86–2003/04: Multan
- 1988/89–1996/97: United Bank Limited
- 1996/97–2000/01: Faisalabad
- 1998/99: Rawalpindi
- 2001/02: National Bank of Pakistan
- 2006/07: Water and Power Development Authority
- 2007: Yorkshire
- 2007/08–2008/09: Hyderabad Heroes
- 2007/08–2008/09: Lahore Badshahs

Head coaching information
- Years: Team
- 2015–2016: Afghanistan

Career statistics
Competition	Test	ODI	FC	LA
Matches	120	378	245	458
Runs scored	8,830	11,739	16,785	13,746
Batting average	49.60	39.53	50.10	38.04
100s/50s	25/46	10/83	45/87	12/97
Top score	329	137*	329	157*
Balls bowled	9	58	2,704	896
Wickets	0	3	39	30
Bowling average	–	21.33	33.20	24.66
5 wickets in innings	–	0	2	0
10 wickets in match	–	0	0	0
Best bowling	–	1/0	5/80	3/18
Catches/stumpings	81/–	113/–	172/–	128/–
Medal record
Men's Cricket
Representing Pakistan
ICC Cricket World Cup
Winner	1992 Australia and New Zealand
Runner-up	1999 England-Wales -Ireland-Scotland-Netherlands
- Source: CricketArchive, 20 September 2008

Syed Inzamam-ul-Haq SI (Urdu: سید انضمام الحق; born 3 March 1970), also known as Inzi, is a former Pakistan cricketer and was captain of the Pakistan national test cricket team between 2003 and 2007. He is regarded as one of the greatest players Pakistan has produced and one of the best middle-order batsmen of all time. He was the former chief selector of the Pakistan cricket team before resigning in 2023. He was a part of the Pakistani squad which won the 1992 Cricket World Cup.

He was the leading run scorer for Pakistan in one-day internationals, and the third-highest run scorer for Pakistan in Test cricket. He is the only Pakistani batsman to score 20,000 runs in international cricket. As well as being a prolific batsman, he also occasionally bowled gentle left-arm spin.

Inzamam rose to fame in the semi-final of the 1992 Cricket World Cup. He remained one of the team's leading batsmen throughout the decade in both Test and ODI cricket. In 2003, he was appointed captain of the team. His tenure as captain ended after Pakistan's early exit from the 2007 Cricket World Cup. Inzamam retired from international cricket in 2007, following the second Test match against South Africa, falling three runs short of Javed Miandad as Pakistan's leading run scorer in Test cricket at the time. Following his retirement, he joined the Indian Cricket League, captaining the Hyderabad Heroes in the inaugural edition of the Twenty20 competition. In the ICL's second edition, he captained the Lahore Badshahs, a team composed entirely of Pakistani cricketers.

Inzamam-ul-Haq is a prominent member of the Tablighi Jamaat, an Islamic missionary organisation, and remains an influential personality in Pakistan cricket.

In April 2016, he was appointed the chief selector of the Pakistan national cricket team. In August 2023, he was again appointed chief selector of the Pakistan cricket team.

== Early and personal life ==
=== Family background ===
Inzamam-ul-Haq was born in Multan, Punjab, Pakistan, on 3 March 1970 into a Punjabi family professing Sunni Islam. His family had moved from the city of Hansi in Punjab Province, British India (now in Haryana, India) following the 1947 partition of India.

The youngest of five siblings (four brothers and one sister), his Syed family was called pir for its historical involvement in Sufism and the preaching of Islam, descending from Jamal-ud-Din Hansvi, a scholar and poet who was from the lineage of Abu Hanifa and a direct disciple of the famous 12th-century Sufi poet Baba Farid. Inzamam's grandfather, Pir Zia-ul-Haq, was also a famed religious figure. This background led him to embrace the Islamic way of life quite early in his own life.

His nephew Imam-ul-Haq also plays cricket for Pakistan.

=== Business ===
In 2010, Inzamam and Saeed Anwar started Meat One, a chain of specialty meat shops.

In 2017, Inzamam launched Legends of Inzamam ul Haq, a clothing store in Lahore.

== Domestic career ==
=== First-class cricket in Pakistan ===
Inzamam started his career playing for his hometown club, Multan, in 1985. He went on to represent United Bank Limited, Faisalabad, Rawalpindi, National Bank of Pakistan, and Water and Power Development Authority in his homeland.

=== County cricket in England ===
Inzamam made his debut in English county cricket in August 2007 at the age of 37. He joined Yorkshire County Cricket Club as a replacement for Younus Khan who left to play for Pakistan in the 2007 ICC World Twenty20. He was disappointing on the whole, making eight on debut at Scarborough's North Marine Road against Warwickshire before making nine and seven in his opening Pro40 games. He failed to transfer his international form into English county cricket.

=== ICL in India ===
In 2007, Inzamam joined the unsanctioned Indian Cricket League (ICL) which was highly controversial. In the inaugural competition, Inzamam captained the Hyderabad Heroes and scored 141 runs in 5 matches. In the 2008 competition in March, Inzamam captained the Lahore Badshahs, composed entirely of Pakistani cricketers.

The move to the ICL had proved to be a controversial one for Inzamam. The Pakistan Cricket Board's stance on players joining unsanctioned leagues meant that he had been banned from playing in any domestic competitions in Pakistan or any involvement with the international team. However, given Inzamam had recently retired, it was unlikely to have affected him.

It is reported that he was paid Pakistani Rs. 100 million (US$1,100,000) which was the highest salary for any player participating in the league along with the likes of Brian Lara.

== International career ==
=== One Day International ===
Inzamam made his ODI debut in a home series against West Indies in 1991, and made a good start to his career by scoring 20 and 60 runs in two matches against West Indies. This was followed by 48, 60, 101, and 117 runs against Sri Lanka. Inzamam also had his name in record books early on when he took wicket of his 1st ball in ODI cricket when he got Brian Lara caught behind.

Handpicked by former Pakistan captain Imran Khan for the 1992 Cricket World Cup in Australia and New Zealand, 22-year-old Inzamam was relatively unheard of before the tournament. To the surprise of many he was persevered with throughout the tournament, coming in at various positions in the batting line-up, despite not being very successful early on. Yet it was his performances at the most crucial stage of the competition that made fans and summarisers take note. Inzamam rose to fame in Pakistan's dramatic semi-final against New Zealand at Auckland. With his team in a precarious position, being 140/4 in the 35th over and needing an 123 runs off the final 15 overs, chasing 262 against an impressive New Zealand team, he joined Javed Miandad and hit a fiery 60 run innings from just 37 balls to rescue his team and guide them into the final. The innings was regarded as one of the finest World Cup performances. He hit a massive six in that match which was described by David Lloyd as the shot of the tournament.

Inzamam made an equally vital contribution in the final of the World Cup, scoring 42 runs off just 35 balls, helping Pakistan reach a score of 249 after a sluggish start. These innings established Inzamam's billing as a big-game player, although he was unable to replicate his World Cup success in later tournaments.

Inzamam regard his best least highlighted innings of 90 not out against West Indies when Pakistan won their first ODI in the West Indies on 27 March 1993.

In total, Inzamam set a record for scoring the most half centuries in One Day Internationals, 83 – though this is now surpassed by Sachin Tendulkar, Jacques Kallis and Kumar Sangakkara. He also became the second batsman to score 10,000 runs in One-day Internationals (again after Tendulkar) and was named in the ICC World XI for both Tests and One-day Internationals in the 2005 ICC Awards. In his final ODI for Pakistan, playing against Zimbabwe in the 2007 Cricket World Cup, he took three catches whilst fielding, including the last one of the match, ending his One Day career.

=== Test ===
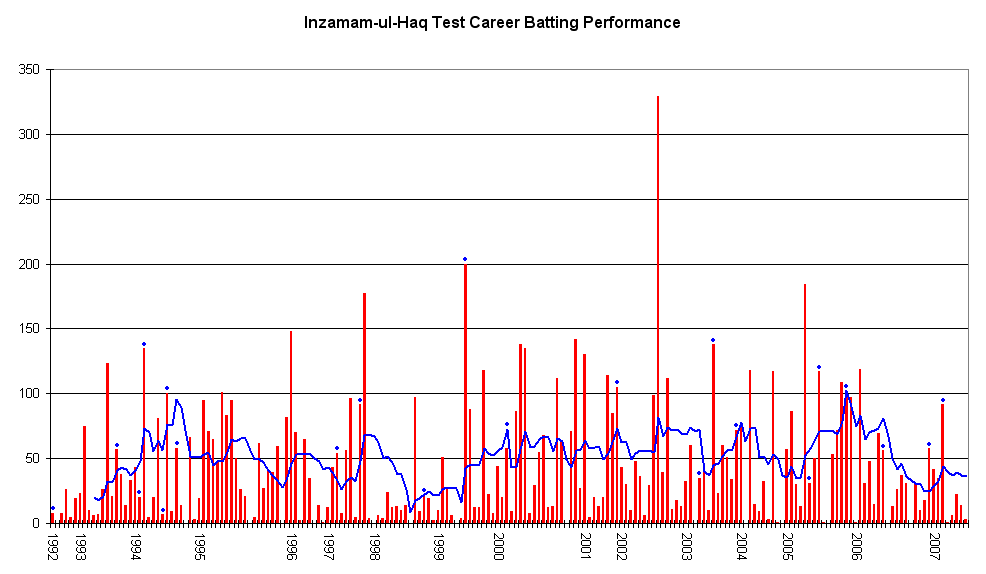
Graph of Inzamam-ul-Haq's scores in test cricket.

Inzamam made his Test debut in 1992 against England at Edgbaston. He had little opportunity to make an impact in that match – he was not out with a score of 8. However, in subsequent matches he demonstrated vulnerability against swing bowling which resulted in his being dropped for the final Test of the series after averaging a lowly 13.20 runs per innings. Pakistan went on to secure a famous win in the match, taking the series 2–1.

After the England series, Inzamam aimed to establish himself in the Test team and he achieved this brilliantly, helping his team to many memorable victories. One of particular note came against Australia in Karachi, 1994, when he made 58 not out with the tail and helped Pakistan to a one-wicket victory and a 1–0 series win. As well as helping his team to become the top-ranked team in the world for a brief period, he achieved personal success by becoming International Cricket Council's number one ranked batsman in 1995. He later went on to reclaim top spot in the rankings in 1997. He remained amongst the top 20 ranked batsmen up until his retirement. He was the number one batsman in the world three times and held the title of the 3rd best batsman several times in his career including a long run from 2004 to 2006, the last time being after his twin fifties at Lords against England in 2006. The tour of England in 1996 was a particular success for both Inzamam and Pakistan, where Inzamam transformed his batting against seam bowling, averaging 64 runs per innings, with scores of 148, 70, 65, and 5.

Inzamam-ul-Haq's results in international matches
	Matches	Won	Lost	Drawn	Tied	No result
Test	120	49	39	32	0	–
ODI	378	215	148	-	6	9
T20I	1	1	-	–	-	-

His Test career highlights include 329 against New Zealand in Lahore in the 2001–02 season, which is the second highest Test score by a Pakistani and the twelfth highest overall. He also scored a century (184 runs) in his 100th Test, becoming only the fifth player to do so (after Colin Cowdrey, Alec Stewart, Gordon Greenidge and Javed Miandad; Ricky Ponting and Joe Root have subsequently emulated the feat). Inzamam made a century in each innings of the second Test match against England in 2005, to become Pakistan's leading centurion with 24 centuries, breaking Javed Miandad's record. His 25th century in the 2nd Test against India on 22 January 2006 made him the 10th player to score 25 or more centuries. He also managed 138 not out when the team was on the brink of a humiliating defeat against Bangladesh, eventually saving the Test match and leading his team to victory. His 92 not out against South Africa in late 2006 again showed his ability to bat in a crisis in a match winning manner. He scored twin half centuries when all appeared lost to draw the first test in Mohali against India in 2005, and also scored 184 runs in his 100th test match in the same away series causing the series to be drawn. He still holds the record for most consecutive half centuries against a country with nine in nine innings against England. This streak started from 31 May 2001 and lasted till 13 July 2006. He scored a century and a half century at Lords in 1996. His 118 against Australia in Hobart almost won the test for Pakistan but Adam Gilchrist's match winning 149 not out made the difference. His average in matches won is second only to Donald Bradman and Kumar Sangakkara.

After announcing that he would retire after the second Test against South Africa, at the stadium where he made his international debut, Inzamam needed 20 runs to surpass Javed Miandad for the record of most runs for a Pakistani Test cricketer. After falling for 14 in the first innings, he was dismissed for 3 in his final innings by Paul Harris, out stumped, leaving him three runs shy of the record. He needed only 70 more career runs for a batting average of 50.

== Playing style ==
I think Inzamam is as talented as Brian Lara and Sachin Tendulkar but little does he realise his true talent

— Former Pakistan captain Imran Khan.

=== Batting ===
Inzamam was a destructive batsman in both One Day Internationals (ODIs) and Test matches. He had the ability to pick the length of a delivery very early and play very late. His footwork was generally considered to be fast, enabling him to position himself early for shots. He averaged just under 50 runs per innings in Tests and nearly 40 runs in ODIs, with a strike rate of 54.03 and 74.23 respectively. Inzamam was especially strong when playing shots off his legs and was considered to be amongst the best exponents of the pull-shot in world cricket.

His batting style brought him fans from all over the world. He was called "the best batsmen in the world against pace" by Imran Khan, because "he seems to have so much time on his hands before the ball reaches him".

=== Fielding ===
Despite not fitting the traditional mold of an agile or fast athlete and his heavy frame, Inzamam was considered a gifted slip fielder, noted for his "soft hands" that absorbed the high-speed impact of edges off fast bowlers as well for his instinctive reflexes and sharp anticipation.

However, Inzamam also gained a reputation for being a rather poor runner between the wickets, having been involved in a number of comical run outs. He has the dubious distinction of being run out the second-highest number of times in ODIs, having been run out 40 times behind Marvan Atapattu (41 times).

== Captaincy ==
Inzamam's record as captain
Format	Matches	Won	Lost	Drawn	No result	Win (%)
Test	31	11	11	9	–	35.48
ODI	87	51	33	–	3	60.71
T20I	1	1	–	–	–	100.00

Inzamam captained Pakistan in 31 Tests, winning 11, drawing nine and losing ten. Only three players have captained Pakistan in more Test matches, but all have better win–loss records and only Imran Khan has a lower win percentage than Inzamam. The Oval Test match in 2006 was poised as a victory for Pakistan before the controversy took place, and had it not occurred it is likely that Inzamam's record would have had one more win and one fewer loss. Notwithstanding his win–loss record, Inzamam held the captaincy until March 2007, the longest captaincy tenure since 1992 (when Imran Khan retired).

Captaincy had a positive effect on Inzamam's batting, and he often led by example in pressure situations, averaging more as a captain (52) than when not (50). Inzamam also held the highest average as captain in ODIs and is currently third on that list behind the former Australian skipper Ricky Ponting and the Indian captain Mahendra Singh Dhoni. After early failures in Australia, he took a depleted Pakistan team to India in 2005 and played an important role in securing a draw by winning the final test match from an unlikely position with an innings of 184 runs. He subsequently led his team to an ODI success against West Indies (away), England (home) and Sri Lanka (away) as well as Test Series victories against England (home), India (home), Sri Lanka (away). Inzamam had seemed to have united the Pakistan team and victories led them to 2nd place in the ICC Test Rankings and 3rd place in the ICC ODI Ranking. The latter part of Inzamam's tenure as Pakistan captain was less successful and the team was embroiled in many controversies culminating in a disappointingly early exit from the 2007 Cricket World Cup at the hands of lowly ranked Ireland.

In the 2007 Cricket World Cup, Inzamam captained the Pakistani team to its first loss to associate ICC member Ireland (on Saint Patrick's Day). This result and their previous loss to West Indies, led to them being knocked out of the tournament. A day later he announced his retirement from One Day International Cricket and resignation as Test captain. The announcement was made the same day that Bob Woolmer, Pakistan's coach, died in his hotel room in Kingston, Jamaica. He dedicated his final ODI to Woolmer to whom he shared a good relationship with for three years and affectionately called him 'The Bob'.

In December 2012, Inzamam was appointed as a batting consultant to Pakistan's national team on a short-term basis in preparation for the 2013 tour of India. In October 2015, he was appointed as the temporary head coach of the Afghanistan national cricket team for their tour of Zimbabwe in October 2015. His contract was then renewed until December 2016 after the successful tour of Zimbabwe where they won both the ODIs and T20Is which was Afghanistan's first series win against a Test playing nation. However, in April 2016 with almost eight months in his contract remaining, he resigned as Afghanistan coach to become Pakistan chief selector.

As the coach of the Afghanistan cricket team, Afghanistan beat Zimbabwe again in the Group Stage of ICC World Twenty20, which helped them progress to the Super 10 stage. His team battled hard against Sri Lanka and South Africa but were unable to pull off a victory. In their final game of the tournament, they secured a victory against the table-topping West Indies.

On 7 August 2023, Inzamam was appointed chief selector of the Pakistan cricket team.

== Controversies ==
=== Toronto incident ===
In a 1997 Sahara Cup match against India in Toronto, Inzamam assaulted a member of the crowd, Shiv Kumar Thind, a Canada-based Indian, who had been comparing Inzamam to several kinds of potato over a megaphone. According to eyewitnesses a cricket bat was brought out by the Pakistan team's 12th man, Mohammad Hussain, who then waited at the boundary with the bat. Television replays confirmed those statements. The Guardian newspaper quoted another eyewitness as saying "If not for the spectators and security staff curbing him, he would have broken the head of that guy. The guy with the megaphone was no match for Inzamam and got mauled. Even when Canadian police took Inzamam back on to the field, he was trying to get back to the stands."

=== Oval Test incident ===
On Pakistan's 2006 tour of England, Inzamam captained a team that refused to re-enter the field after tea, on 20 August 2006 at The Oval after allegations of ball tampering from umpires Darrell Hair and Billy Doctrove. The umpires had awarded England five penalty runs and the choice of a replacement ball, after ruling that Pakistan had illegally altered the ball.

Inzamam and his team staged a protest at the decision. During the protest the umpires, having tried to persuade Inzamam to come out of the dressing room, decided that the match could not continue. Later, Inzamam returned to the field with his team, only to find both the umpires and the English team absent. After further discussions between both teams, umpires and cricket board officials it was eventually agreed that the match could not be restarted. Thus, Inzamam became the first captain in history to forfeit a Test match. Inzamam was later charged with tampering with the ball and bringing the game into disrepute (the latter charge associated with the teatime protest). He strenuously denied the charges. On 28 September 2006, the allegations of ball-tampering were dismissed, however he was found guilty of bringing cricket into disrepute and given a four match One-Day International ban with immediate effect.

=== Religious influence ===
In 2006–07, controversy arose that Inzamam and other players who were members of the Tablighi Jamaat Islamic missionary group, were coercing other players and giving preferential treatment to those players who grew beards and prayed regularly. The then-Pakistani President Pervez Musharraf expressed his concerns to the then-PCB chairman Nasim Ashraf, who warned Inzamam and told the players to stop public displays of religious beliefs. Late Pakistan coach Bob Woolmer also stated that while religion fostered a degree of unity, it also interfered in the team's training and practice sessions. Inzamam publicly denied accusations of forcing Islam on other players.

=== Yazoo International ===
In October 2023, it was reported that Inzamam was serving as a director of the UK-based Yazoo International Ltd. He was alongside three others: Mohammad Rizwan, a member of the Pakistan national cricket team; Talha Rehmani, managing director of Saya Corporation; and Intisar-ul-Haq, Inzamam's brother, who serves as the company secretary. They were all appointed to their respective positions on 7 December 2020. The association of a national cricket selector with both a player and an agency representative raised concerns over potential conflict of interest. Consequently, Inzamam-ul-Haq resigned from his role as the chief selector on 30 October 2023.

== Honours ==
The Pakistani Government, in 2005, awarded Inzamam ul-Haq with the Sitara-e-Imtiaz.

== See also ==
- List of international cricket centuries by Inzamam-ul-Haq

Preceded by Rashid Latif	Pakistani national cricket captain 2004–2007	Succeeded by Shoaib Malik
