= Azhar Mahmood =

Pakistani cricket coach and former cricketer

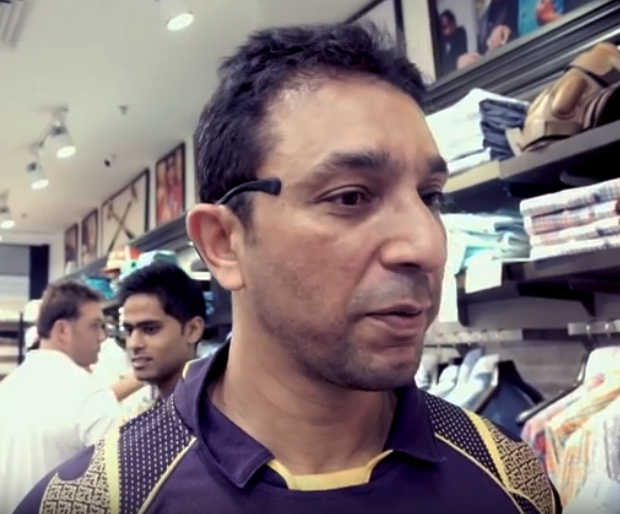
- Azhar Mahmood in 2015

Personal information
- Born: 28 February 1975 (age 51); Rawalpindi, Punjab, Pakistan
- Height: 183 cm (6 ft 0 in)
- Batting: Right-handed
- Bowling: Right-arm medium-fast
- Role: All-rounder

International information
- National side: Pakistan (1996–2007)
- Test debut (cap 146): 6 October 1997 v South Africa
- Last Test: 31 May 2001 v England
- ODI debut (cap 108): 16 September 1996 v India
- Last ODI: 17 March 2007 v Ireland

Domestic team information
- Years: Team
- 1993/94–2006/07: Islamabad
- 1995/96–1996/97: United Bank Limited
- 1998/99–2004/05: Rawalpindi
- 1999/00–2001/02: PIA
- 2002–2007; 2013–2016: Surrey
- 2006/07–2010/11: Habib Bank Limited
- 2006/07–2010/11: Islamabad Leopards
- 2008–2012: Kent
- 2011/12–2012/13: Auckland
- 2012: Dhaka Gladiators
- 2012–2013: Kings XI Punjab
- 2012/13: Sydney Thunder
- 2013: Barisal Burners
- 2013: Cape Cobras
- 2013: Barbados Tridents
- 2015: Kolkata Knight Riders
- 2016: Islamabad United

Career statistics
Competition	Test	ODI	FC	LA
Matches	21	143	176	319
Runs scored	900	1,521	7,703	4,555
Batting average	30.00	18.10	31.83	22.00
100s/50s	3/1	0/3	9/42	2/19
Top score	136	67	204*	101*
Balls bowled	3,015	6,242	29,798	13,952
Wickets	39	123	611	348
Bowling average	35.94	39.13	25.10	31.37
5 wickets in innings	0	3	27	5
10 wickets in match	0	0	3	0
Best bowling	4/50	6/18	8/61	6/18
Catches/stumpings	14/–	37/–	142/–	95/–
Medal record
Men's Cricket
Representing Pakistan
ICC Cricket World Cup
Runner-up	1999 England-Wales -Ireland-Scotland-Netherlands
- Source: ESPNcricinfo, 22 January 2016

Azhar Mahmood Sagar (Punjabi: اظہر محمود ساگر; born 28 February 1975) is a Pakistani cricket coach and former cricketer. He was the bowling coach of the Pakistan national cricket team from 2016 to 2019. He was a part of the Pakistan squad which finished as runners-up at the 1999 Cricket World Cup.

Previously, he played Tests and ODIs for the Pakistan national team and county cricket in England. Azhar is a dual British citizen.

== Personal life ==
Azhar Mahmood's wedding ceremony was held in 2003.

== Cricket career ==
=== Domestic career ===
As a teenager, Azhar was mentored by Irfan Bhatti who played a One Day International for Pakistan in the early 1990s. Originally his father objected to his interest in cricket, but later started to appreciate it seeing his accomplishments. When not doing net practice, Azhar would fancy himself playing tape ball cricket on the cemented pitch in the cricket ground in front of his home.

He played county cricket for Surrey and in November 2007 signed a two-year deal to play for Kent.

Azhar became a British citizen in 2011. This allowed him to play for Kent as an English-qualified player, further distancing himself from a recall to the Pakistan team.

It was announced that Azhar would be playing for the Auckland Aces as one of their overseas professionals in the 2011/12 season. In the 2012 IPL auction, Mahmood was sold to Kings XI Punjab for $200,000, double his base price of $100,000. In 2015, he was signed by KKR as replacement for James Neesham and played a few matches but was dropped from the squad the next season.

He along with Isuru Udana set the then highest 8th wicket partnership in all forms of T20s (120) during the inaugural SLPL league in 2012.

=== International career ===
==== Early days ====
Azhar made his One-Day International debut against India in 1996 at Toronto Cricket Club, Toronto, but did not gain major recognition until his Test debut against South Africa the following year at Rawalpindi Cricket Stadium, Rawalpindi when he hit a century and a half-century without being dismissed. He later went on to score two more centuries against the South Africans.

He joined the Pakistani team as a medium pacer and has also played as a lower-order batsman in One Day International (ODI) cricket. Unlike many Pakistani swing bowlers, he bowls as a seam bowler.

In 2000, Lt-General Tauqir Zia, then the PCB chairman, said that the board would choose the next captain – not based on seniority alone – and if people find the choice unacceptable they will not be selected. Later – in front of some senior players – he told Azhar Mahmood that he will be the next Pakistan captain. Together they would plan the future strategy. But this never came to pass.

==== Comeback ====
He was recalled to the national team for the ODI series against South Africa in early 2007, but subsequently dropped when the 2007 Cricket World Cup team was announced. He was however recalled to go with the squad to the West Indies after a knee injury to Abdul Razzaq. It was Mahmood's 3rd World Cup.

However, aside from playing in a practice match, Azhar did not get a chance to participate in the World Cup and Pakistan's early exit from the tournament meant that he was once again, in line for being axed from the national squad. Following his exclusion, Azhar returned to playing county cricket in UK. Over the years, due to his constant exclusion from the Pakistani squad and the fact that he has crossed the 30-year-old mark, it seems that Mahmood is not as interested in returning to the Pakistani line up as he once was. His weight gain, mediocre performances in ODIs, combined with the tough competition for the all rounder slot in the Pakistani line up meant that his chances for making a return to the national squad were very limited. He has previously signed with the defunct Indian Cricket League (ICL) and had been released from his central contract.

==== Trivia ====
Wisden in 2001 included Azhar Mahmood's innings of 132 for Pakistan against South Africa at Kingsmead Cricket Ground, Durban in 1997–98 as the 8th best Test Innings of All Time in its list of Wisden 100. It mentioned – "South Africa's pace attack had more depth than at any other time in their history: Allan Donald and Shaun Pollock supported by Fanie de Villiers and Lance Klusener. No surprise that Pakistan were put in to bat on a treacherous pitch – or that they should be reduced to 89 for 5. Salvation came in the form of a 22-year-old allrounder who seemed to be batting too low at No.7: his century was already his third in six Test innings against South Africa. Tucking into a great pace bowler like Donald, he scored 96 runs in boundaries while proving himself an expert shepherd of a tail: he made 90% of Pakistan's last 106 runs. They went on to win a low-scoring match by 29."

== Coaching career ==
In November 2016, Mahmood was appointed bowling coach of the Pakistan team. Earlier the same year, he had served two short stints in a similar capacity, also for the national team. He left the role in August 2019 when his contract was not extended.

Mahmood also served as the bowling coach of two PSL Franchises Karachi Kings & Multan Sultans.

On 3 December 2021, Mahmood has appointed by Islamabad United as the head coach for their 7th season of PSL. Ahead of the 2024 season, Mahmood left his role as head coach and was appointed Islamabad's bowling coach. In April 2024, Mahmood was appointed Pakistan's head coach for their series against New Zealand. In June 2025, Azhar Mahmood was appointed as the acting head coach of the Pakistan national Test cricket team, following a period of coaching instability after Jason Gillespie's resignation in December 2024. Azhar, who had been serving as Pakistan's all-formats assistant coach since April 2025, is expected to hold the position until the end of his contract in March 2026.

In July 2025, Azhar Mehmood was appointed as the acting red-ball head coach of the Pakistan men's cricket team. The move comes after a string of unsuccessful coaching experiments, including Aaqib Javed's dual role as selector and coach, which ended following Pakistan's underwhelming performance in the 2025 ICC Champions Trophy.
