= Zeenat Haroon Rashid =

Pakistani women's rights activist (1928–2017)

- زینت ہارون راشد
- Born: Zeenat Haroon Rashid; January 21, 1928
- Died: April 8, 2017 (aged 89)
- Known for: Feminist, Founder of Women's National Guard Movement, 'Zeenat Haroon Rashid Writing Prize For Women'
- Parent(s): Abdullah Haroon (father); Lady Abdullah Haroon (mother), Mian Abdul Rashid (father-in-law)

Zeenat Haroon Rashid (Urdu: زینت ہارون راشد; January 21, 1928 – April 8, 2017) was a Pakistani women's rights activist and founding member of the Women's National Guard.

== Early life and family ==
Born in 1928, she was daughter of Abdullah Haroon and Lady Abdullah Haroon.

After her marriage to Safdar Rashid, she became daughter-in-law of Mian Abdul Rashid, the first Chief Justice of Pakistan. They had three children: Haider, Samyra Rashid and Syra Vahidy.

== Career ==
=== Women's National Guard ===
Rashid was a feminist, a supporter of women in public roles and politics. She was active member of the Muslim League and founding member of the Women’s National Guard at the time of creation of Pakistan. As a member of "Women’s National Guard", she learned self-defence, first aid and helped people to register to vote. She claimed the women in the guard as a symbol of progress.

Rashid became known for women's empowerment, when Margaret Bourke-White, captured her photograph while she was practising with the Women's National Guard. The photograph was published in Life's cover story on Pakistan in January 1948.

=== Zeenat Haroon Rashid Writing Prize for Women ===
To honour the memory of Rashid, the "Zeenat Haroon Rashid Writing Prize for Women" has been set by her daughter Syra Rashid Vahidy. The prize will be awarded annually in the hope that it works to support the women who want to pursue writing as a career.

The panel of judges for the prize include Ameena Saiyid, the former director of Oxford University Press in Pakistan, and Moni Mohsin, the author of the best-selling novel, The Diary of a Social Butterfly, (2008). Most of the stories given prizes are about violence against women including child sexual abuse, domestic abuse, restriction for women going to higher education, murder, forced marriages, the double standards being applied between women and men and place of women in public spaces.
