= History of cricket in Pakistan from 2001 =

This article describes the history of cricket in Pakistan from the 2000–01 season to the present.

== Events ==
Notable Pakistan players in the 21st century include Inzamam-ul-Haq, Younis Khan, Mohammed Yousuf, Abdul Razzaq (cricketer), Saeed Ajmal, Shahid Afridi, Shoaib Akhtar, Umar Gul, and Misbah ul Haq.

== National championships ==
Winners of the Qaid-i-Azam Trophy from 2001 have been:

- 2000–01 – Lahore City Blues
- 2001–02 – Karachi Whites
- 2002–03 – PIA
- 2003–04 – Faisalabad
- 2004–05 – Peshawar
- 2005–06 – Sialkot
- 2006–07 – Karachi Urban

Winners of the PCB Patron's Trophy from 2001 have been:

- 2000–01 – Pakistan Customs
- 2001–02 – National Bank
- 2002–03 – Sahiwal
- 2003–04 – ZTBL
- 2004–05 – Habib Bank and PIA shared
- 2005–06 – National Bank
- 2006–07 – Habib Bank

Winners of the One Day National Tournament from 2001 have been:

- 2000–01 – Karachi Whites
- 2001–02 – PIA

the trophy was renamed the PCB Patron's Cup in 2002

- 2002–03 – PIA
- 2003–04 – Habib Bank
- 2004–05 – WAPDA
- 2005–06 – Habib Bank
- 2006–07 – National Bank
- 2007–08 – Sui Northern Gas Pipelines Limited
- 2008–09 – Sialkot
- 2009–10 – Karachi B
- 2010–11 – Habib Bank Limited
- 2011–12 – Lahore Lions
- 2012–13 – Karachi Blues
- 2013–14 – United Bank Limited
- 2014–15 – Sui Northern Gas Pipelines Limited
- 2015–16 – Sui Northern Gas Pipelines Limited
- 2016–17 – Water and Power Development Authority (WAPDA)
- 2017–18 – Sui Northern Gas Pipelines Limited
- 2018–19 – Habib Bank Limited
- 2019–20 – Central Punjab
- 2020–21 – Shared: Central Punjab & Khyber Pakhtunkhwa
- 2021–22 – Khyber Pakhtunkhwa
- 2022–23 – Northern
- 2023–24 – Karachi Whites
- 2024–25 – Sialkot

== International tours of Pakistan ==
=== England 2000–01 ===
- 1st Test at Gaddafi Stadium, Lahore – match drawn
- 2nd Test at Iqbal Stadium, Faisalabad – match drawn
- 3rd Test at National Stadium, Karachi – England won by six wickets

=== Asian Test Championship 2001–02 ===
- Pakistan v Bangladesh at Multan Cricket Stadium – Pakistan won by an innings and 264 runs
- Pakistan v Sri Lanka at Gaddafi Stadium, Lahore – Sri Lanka won by 8 wickets

For full details of this tournament, see : 2001–02 Asian Test Championship

=== New Zealand 2001–02 ===
The tour was cancelled for security reasons in the wake of the World Trade Center attack on 11 September 2001.

Three Tests had been scheduled at Arbab Niaz Stadium, Peshawar; Iqbal Stadium, Faisalabad; and the National Stadium, Karachi

=== West Indies 2001–02 ===
- 1st Test at Sharjah Cricket Association Stadium – Pakistan won by 170 runs
- 2nd Test at Sharjah Cricket Association Stadium – Pakistan won by 244 runs

=== New Zealand 2002 ===
- 1st Test at Gaddafi Stadium, Lahore – Pakistan won by an innings and 324 runs
- 2nd Test at National Stadium, Karachi – game cancelled after a bomb exploded near the New Zealand team hotel on the first morning of the match

=== Australia 2002–03 ===
- 1st Test at P Saravanamuttu Stadium, Colombo – Australia won by 41 runs
- 2nd Test at Sharjah Cricket Association Stadium – Australia won by an innings and 198 runs
- 3rd Test at Sharjah Cricket Association Stadium – Australia won by an innings and 20 runs

=== Bangladesh 2003 ===
- 1st Test at National Stadium, Karachi – Pakistan won by 7 wickets
- 2nd Test at Arbab Niaz Stadium, Peshawar – Pakistan won by 9 wickets
- 3rd Test at Multan Cricket Stadium – Pakistan won by 1 wicket

For full details of this tour, see : Bangladeshi cricket team in Pakistan in 2003

=== India 2003–04 ===
- 1st Test at Multan Cricket Stadium – India won by an innings and 52 runs
- 2nd Test at Gaddafi Stadium, Lahore – Pakistan won by 9 wickets
- 3rd Test at Rawalpindi Cricket Stadium – India won by an innings and 131 runs.

=== South Africa 2003–04 ===
- 1st Test at Gaddafi Stadium, Lahore – Pakistan won by 8 wickets
- 2nd Test at Iqbal Stadium, Faisalabad – match drawn

=== Sri Lanka 2004–05 ===
- 1st Test at Iqbal Stadium, Faisalabad – Pakistan won by 123 runs
- 2nd Test at National Stadium, Karachi – Pakistan won by 6 wickets

=== England 2005–06 ===
- 1st Test at Multan Cricket Stadium – Pakistan won by 22 runs
- 2nd Test at Iqbal Stadium, Faisalabad – match drawn
- 3rd Test at Gaddafi Stadium, Lahore – Pakistan won by an innings and 100 runs

For full details of this tour, see : English cricket team in Pakistan in 2005–06

=== India 2005–06 ===
- 1st Test at Gaddafi Stadium, Lahore – match drawn
- 2nd Test at Iqbal Stadium, Faisalabad – match drawn
- 3rd Test at National Stadium, Karachi – Pakistan won by 341 runs

For full details of this tour, see : Indian cricket team in Pakistan in 2005–06

=== West Indies 2006–07 ===
- 1st Test at Gaddafi Stadium, Lahore – Pakistan won by 9 wickets
- 2nd Test at Multan Cricket Stadium – match drawn
- 3rd Test at National Stadium, Karachi – Pakistan won by 199 runs

For full details of this tour, see : West Indies cricket team in Pakistan in 2006–07

=== South Africa 2007 ===
- 1st Test at National Stadium, Karachi. South Africa won by 160 runs
- 2nd Test at Gaddafi Stadium, Lahore. Match Drawn

=== Sri Lanka 2008–09 ===
- 1st Test at National Stadium, Karachi – Match drawn
- 2nd Test at Gaddafi Stadium, Lahore – match drawn

For full details of this tour, see : Sri Lankan cricket team in Pakistan in 2008–09

=== Zimbabwe 2015–16 ===
- 1st T20 at Gaddafi Stadium, Lahore – Pakistan won by 5 wickets.

=== World XI (Independence Cup) 2017 ===
Pakistan won the series 2–1. For full details of this series, see: 2017 Independence Cup (cricket)

=== Sri Lanka 2019 ===
For full details of this tour, see: Sri Lankan cricket team in Pakistan in 2019–20, Sri Lanka won the T20I series 3–0 and Pakistan won the Test series 1–0.

=== South Africa 2021 ===
For full details of this tour, see: South African cricket team in Pakistan in 2020–21, Pakistan won the Test series 2–0 and T20I series 2–1.

=== West Indies 2021–22 ===
For full details of this tour, see: West Indian cricket team in Pakistan in 2021–22, Pakistan won the T20I series 3–0; the ODI series was postponed.

=== Australia 2022 ===
For full details of this tour, see: Australian cricket team in Pakistan in 2021–22, Australia won the Test series 1–0; Pakistan won the ODI series 2–1.

=== England 2022 ===
For full details of this tour, see: English cricket team in Pakistan in 2022–23, England won the T20I series 4–3 and Test series 3–0.

=== New Zealand 2023 ===
For full details of this tour, see: New Zealand cricket team in Pakistan in 2022–23 (April 2023), Pakistan won ODI series 4-1 and T20I series drawn 2–2.

== Bibliography ==
- First Class Cricket in Pakistan (5 volumes) by Abid Ali Kazi
- Playfair Cricket Annual
- Wisden Cricketers Almanack (annual)

== External sources ==
- CricketArchive – List of Tournaments in Pakistan
