= Umar Gul =

Pakistani cricket coach and former cricketer

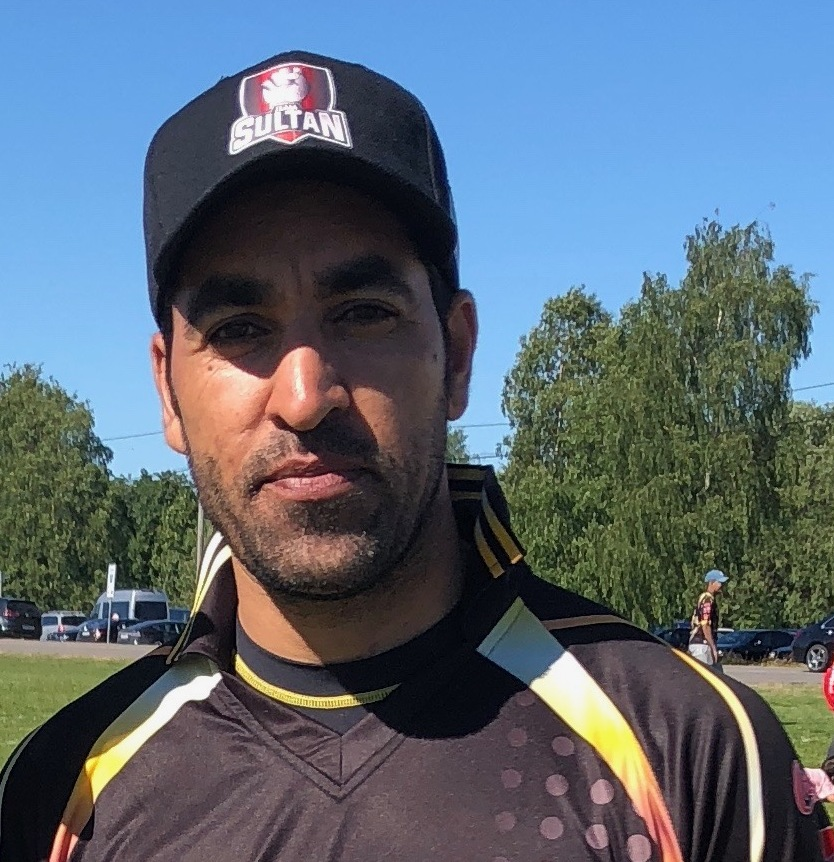
- Gul in 2018

Personal information
- Full name: Umar Gul
- Born: 15 October 1982 (age 44); Peshawar, Pakistan
- Nickname: Sultan of Reverse Swing
- Height: 1.93 m (6 ft 4 in)
- Batting: Right-handed
- Bowling: Right-arm fast-medium
- Role: Bowler
- Relatives: Abbas Afridi (nephew)

International information
- National side: Pakistan (2003–2016)
- Test debut (cap 175): 20 August 2003 v Bangladesh
- Last Test: 14 February 2013 v South Africa
- ODI debut (cap 145): 3 April 2003 v Zimbabwe
- Last ODI: 15 March 2013 v South Africa
- T20I debut (cap 21): 4 September 2007 v Kenya
- Last T20I: 17 January 2016 v New Zealand

Domestic team information
- Years: Team
- 2001/02–2005/06: Pakistan International Airlines
- 2003/04–2011/12: Peshawar
- 2006/07–2018/19: Habib Bank Limited
- 2008: Kolkata Knight Riders
- 2008/09: North-West Frontier
- 2008/09: Western Australia
- 2011: Sussex
- 2012/13–2014/15: Islamabad Leopards
- 2013/14: Habib Bank
- 2014: Khyber Pakhtunkhwa
- 2015/16–2018/19: Islamabad
- 2016–2017: Quetta Gladiators
- 2016–2020/21: Balochistan
- 2017–2018/19: Sindh
- 2018: Multan Sultans

Career statistics
| Competition | Test | ODI | T20I | FC |
|---|---|---|---|---|
| Matches | 47 | 130 | 60 | 125 |
| Runs scored | 577 | 457 | 165 | 1,748 |
| Batting average | 9.94 | 9.72 | 9.16 | 12.05 |
| 100s/50s | 0/1 | 0/0 | 0/0 | 0/3 |
| Top score | 65* | 39 | 32 | 65* |
| Balls bowled | 9,599 | 6,064 | 1,203 | 22,134 |
| Wickets | 163 | 179 | 85 | 479 |
| Bowling average | 34.06 | 29.34 | 16.97 | 25.53 |
| 5 wickets in innings | 4 | 2 | 2 | 27 |
| 10 wickets in match | 0 | 0 | 0 | 3 |
| Best bowling | 6/135 | 6/42 | 5/6 | 8/78 |
| Catches/stumpings | 11/– | 17/– | 18/– | 29/– |
- Source: ESPNcricinfo, 16 October 2020

Umar Gul (Urdu: عمر گل, Pashto: عمر گل) (born 15 October 1982) is a Pakistani cricket coach and former cricketer who is the current bowling consultant of Peshawar Zalmi and interim bowling coach of the Pakistan national cricket team. Gul was a member of the Pakistan team that won the 2009 ICC World Twenty20, being the highest wicket taker of the tournament, along with being the runner-up of the 2007 tournament. In 2007 World Cup as well, he was the highest wicket taker.

He played all three formats of the game as a right arm fast medium bowler for the Pakistani cricket team. He was particularly lethal with the old ball and reverse swing, and has been called "Sultan of Reverse Swing."

Umar Gul was the second-highest wicket-taker in Twenty20 International cricket, with 74 dismissals, behind Saeed Ajmal. He won the Twenty20 International Performance of the Year 2013.

On 16 October 2020, after the final group-stage match of the 2020–21 National T20 Cup, Gul retired from all forms of cricket following a career that spanned twenty years.

== Personal life ==
Gul was born on 15 October 1982 in Peshawar, Pakistan in a middle-class family and frequently played tape ball cricket. He was encouraged by his friends to become an international cricketer as they saw his excellent bowling.

In October 2010, Gul married to a Dubai-based doctor. His daughter, Rehab Umar, was born in May 2012. In the same month, Pakistan Army Commandos mistakenly raided Umar Gul's house in Peshawar and arrested his brother Meeraj Gul on the charge of hiding a wanted militant. However, the commandos later on apologized to Meeraj. Gul has two daughters and one son.

His nephew is cricketer Abbas Afridi.

== Domestic career ==
In February 2008, Gul signed with the Indian Premier League and was drafted by Shahrukh Khan's Kolkata Knight Riders franchise for US$150,000. He played in six matches, taking 12 wickets at an average of 15.33, including a player of the match award in Kolkata's final game in which Gul took 4–23 and scored 24 runs from 11 balls.

In December 2008, Gul signed with the Western Warriors to compete in the Australian domestic 2008–09 KFC Twenty20 Big Bash tournament. He performed very well in his debut match for the Warriors, taking 4 wickets for 15 runs in a losing side. He was among the most successful bowlers in the competition. Despite not being available for the entire tournament, he finished second top wicket-taker with 12 wickets.

In July 2014, he played for the MCC side in the Bicentenary Celebration match at Lord's.

Gul had signed a one-year contract with Gloucestershire to play in 2007, but the Pakistan Cricket Board failed to give them their permission.

In April 2018, he was named in Baluchistan's squad for the 2018 Pakistan Cup. In March 2019, he was named as the captain of Sindh's squad for the 2019 Pakistan Cup. In September 2019, he was named in the Balochistan squad for the 2019–20 Quaid-e-Azam Trophy tournament.

== International career ==
=== Early years ===
Gul was first called up for the team in April 2003, playing four one-day matches at the Cherry Blossom Sharjah Cup against Zimbabwe, Kenya and Sri Lanka, where he took four wickets, and he was in and out of the one-day team after that tournament. However, he played the whole of the 2003 home series against Bangladesh. Making his Test debut, he took 15 wickets in the three Tests, the second-most wickets of any Pakistani bowler in the series, behind Shabbir Ahmed's 17. However, Shoaib Akhtar, who took 13 wickets only played two of the Tests in that series.

Gul was retained for the ODIs against Bangladesh, taking a List A best five for 17 in nine overs in the third match, and ended with 11 wickets in the 5–0 series win. However, he could still not command a regular spot, playing three of Pakistan's nine next ODIs before finally getting dropped after one for 36 against New Zealand.

=== Test cricket ===
He was recalled and played two Tests after that taking four wickets in a drawn Test against New Zealand before coming in as replacement for Shabbir Ahmed in the second Test of the three-Test series against India. After coming on as first-change bowler, Gul dismissed Virender Sehwag in his second over, and then bowled unchanged for 12 overs either side of lunch to take five Indian top order wickets – including Rahul Dravid and Sachin Tendulkar, who both had Test batting averages above 50, as did Sehwag. Gul finished with five for 31 in his spell, earning him commendation from ESPNcricinfo journalist Dileep Premachandran, who praised his "control of line and length", and he was also named Man of the Match despite conceding runs at five an over in the second innings in a nine-wicket win.

After a length injury lay-off, which kept him out of international cricket for nearly two years, Gul returned to the Pakistan fold in 2006. Firstly with quiet away series against Sri Lanka then followed by a tour to England in 2006. Gul was quickly made the lead bowler in the side due to the injuries to other front line bowlers. Gul to 18 wickets in four tests, justifying the selectors faith in him.

Later in 2006, against West Indies at home, Gul had perhaps his most successful test series. He took 16 wickets in 3 tests, including notable spells of reverse swing bowling. He was responsible for breaking Ramnaresh Sarwan's toe with a dipping yorker.

In February 2009, Gul recorded his best test figures in the Pakistan team, taking 6 for 135 on a flat pitch. In July 2010, Pakistan faced England at Trent Bridge and were 147/9 in their first innings. Gul scored 30* before the day was called off due to bad light. He returned the next day with Mohammad Asif and batted with intent to add another 35 runs in five overs. This saw Pakistan avoid the follow-on against England and therefore survive an innings defeat.

Gul then suffered a hamstring injury in the second test when he was touring England in 2010 he was ruled out for three weeks that meant he would miss the remaining two tests. However Gul managed to recover and became fit enough to play in the fourth test However they decided to rest Gul for the final test match despite the fact that he had recovered quicker than expected.

His next chance to play test cricket came against South Africa in November 2010 when he took 3 wickets in a first innings and triggered a South African collapse of 380 on a flat wicket. He took the crucial wicket with an excellent inswinger against AB de Villiers.

=== Twenty20 Internationals ===
With injuries limiting Gul's test cricket participation, he made a distinct change to his bowling set-up, making a focus on bowling in the late overs of T20. He got his opportunity with the absence of Shoaib Akhtar and Abdul Razzaq in the 2007 ICC World Twenty20 held in South Africa. He bowled from the 13th over onwards and finished the tournament with 13 wickets, becoming the leading wicket taker ahead of Shahid Afridi and RP Singh.

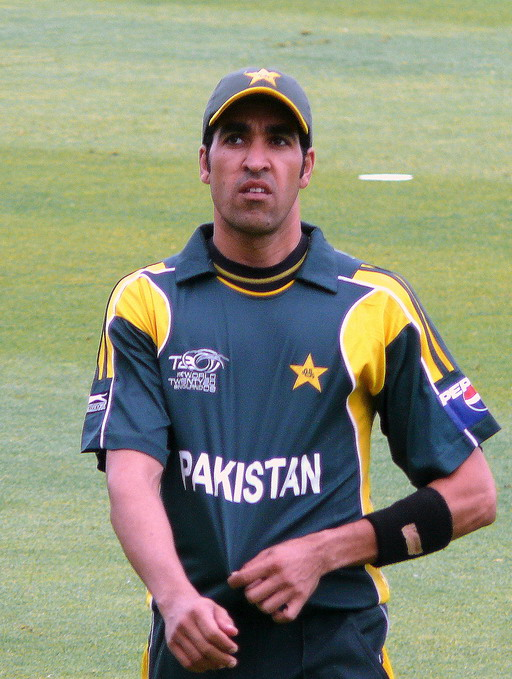
Gul playing for Pakistan in 2009 ICC World Twenty20

In the 2009 ICC World Twenty20, he performed well, earning the mantle from at least one pundit of "the outstanding seam bowler of the World Twenty20". His five-wicket haul for just six runs, when Pakistan defeated New Zealand, won especial acclaim. The spell made him the first bowler in history to take a five wickets in a Twenty20 international, and he held the record of best T20 bowling figure until 8 August 2011, when surpassed by Ajantha Mendis (6/16). Mutterings were made about a possible correlation between ball tampering and the exorbitant amounts of reverse swing he was able to extract, but he denied them categorically: "whenever an Asian bowler performs and uses the reverse-swing, the Western cricketing countries raise the issue of ball-tampering against them." The spell was voted as the best T20I bowling performance of the year by ESPNcricinfo. He was named in the 'Team of the Tournament' by ESPNcricinfo for the 2009 T20I World Cup.

His spell was of 4 for 8 against Australia at Dubai was also nominated to be one of the Best T20I Bowling Performance of the year by ESPNcricinfo.

He was also part of the Pakistan team that lifted the trophy at Lord's while also finishing as the leading wicket taker of the tournament for the second consecutive time. He gained a lot of wickets bowled, in particular with late reverse swinging yorkers, which dip late to slide under the bat and leave little room for batsmen to maneuver the ball. Consequently, he has also an excellent economy rate in this format of the game.

Internationally, Gul has taken 47 wickets in 32 games at an average of 14.65. He is the second leading wicket-taker in Twenty20 Internationals behind teammate Shahid Afridi.

=== One Day Internationals ===
Gul appeared in all three of Pakistan's group matches in the 2007 World Cup taking four wickets with an economy rate of 3.13, only Shane Bond of those to deliver 100 balls was more economical. He also appeared in all of Pakistan's matches at the 2007 ICC World Twenty20 taking 3/15 off 4 overs in the semi-final victory over New Zealand. He took three wickets in the final to finish as the tournament's leading wicket-taker.

For his performances in 2009 and 2011, he was named in the World ODI XI by the ICC. His spell of 6 for 42 against England at The Oval in 2010 was voted as the best ODI bowling performance of the year by ESPNcricinfo.

In January 2016, Gul was suspended from international cricket for a doping offense. Gul was recalled into the ODI squad on 9 August 2016 for the England and Ireland tour.

=== Injuries ===
However, Gul was then ruled out of the third Test with a back injury which kept him out of cricket for an entire year. He returned to play two games at the 2004–05 Faysal Bank T20 Cup, and played some matches for Pakistan A and a Pakistan XI in warm-up games before the Test matches against England the following season, but he was not selected for the matches and has instead played three matches with Peshawar at the Quaid-e-Azam Trophy.

Shortly after making a six-month come-back from a shoulder injury in July 2010 Gul picked up a hamstring injury against England in August but it wasn't too serious and he only missed the two Test matches.

=== Batting skills ===
Despite being a bowler, Gul can perform well as a lower order batsman and has proved his ability as a quick.run-picker His finest moment with the bat came in a test match against England in August 2010 when Pakistan were at 103/7 and Gul came into bat at 8. He scored 29 off 30 deliveries, and when play ended that day, two more wickets had fallen and the team were at 148/9. Pakistan needed 11 more runs to avoid the follow-on, and Gul then came in with his number 10 partner Mohammad Asif. Gul scored 34 runs in just 11 deliveries however his partner Mohammad Asif was run out at the other end and Gul ended on 65 not out.

== Post-retirement ==
=== Coaching career ===
In April 2022, Gul was appointed as bowling consultant by the Afghanistan national cricket team for a training camp which lasted 15 days. In May 2022, he was given a permanent contract as the bowling coach of Afghanistan with his contract lasting until the end of 2022.

On 15 March 2023, Gul was appointed the interim bowling coach of the Pakistani cricket team for the Afghanistan series. In April 2026, he was made bowling coach of the Pakistan national team ahead of the Test tour in Bangladesh.

== See also ==
- Shahid Afridi
- Shoaib Malik
