= Tauqir Zia =

Pakistani retired army officer and cricket administrator

Chairman of the Pakistan Cricket Board
- In office 14 December 1999 – 14 December 2003
- Preceded by: Khalid Mahmood
- Succeeded by: Shaharyar Khan

Personal details
- Born: 20 January 1950 (age 76) Jhelum, Punjab, Pakistan
- Children: Junaid Zia

Military service
- Allegiance: Pakistan
- Branch/service: Pakistan Army
- Years of service: 1970–2003
- Rank: Lieutenant general
- Unit: 19th Lancers
- Battles/wars: Indo-Pakistani War of 1971; Kargil War; 2001–2002 India–Pakistan standoff

Tauqir Zia (born 20 January 1950) is a Pakistani retired military officer who served as the Chairman of the Pakistan Cricket Board (PCB) from 1999 to 2003. He was commissioned in the 19th Lancers in 1970, served as Director General Military Operations during the Kargil War in 1999, and was later promoted to lieutenant general and given command of I Corps at Mangla.

== Early life and education ==
Zia was born to a Kashmiri family in Jhelum. He received his early education at Government College, Lahore, before joining the Pakistan Army.

== Career ==
=== Military ===
He was commissioned in the 19th Lancers in 1970 and served as a troop leader in his parent regiment.

As a major general, Zia served as Director General Military Operations (DGMO) at General Headquarters and was in the post during the Kargil War of 1999. In late September 1999, he was promoted to lieutenant general and appointed commander of I Corps at Mangla. He was serving as Corps Commander Mangla on 12 October 1999, when General Pervez Musharraf overthrew Prime Minister Nawaz Sharif.

He subsequently commanded the Army Field Headquarters during the 2001–2002 India–Pakistan standoff. Zia completed his military service on 14 September 2003.

=== Chairman of the Pakistan Cricket Board ===
In December 1999, shortly after the military takeover, Zia was appointed chairman of the Pakistan Cricket Board, succeeding Khalid Mahmood. He was the first serving army general to hold the position. During his tenure he launched the "Vision 2005" development programme and established a multi-purpose National Cricket Academy in Lahore, while investing in cricket infrastructure across the country, including in Balochistan, Sindh and the former North-West Frontier province. He first tendered his resignation in October 2002 after Pakistan's defeats to Australia in Sharjah, but the resignation was rejected by President Musharraf. On 1 December 2003, Zia announced that his resignation had been accepted and that he would leave office on 14 December 2003, completing his four-year term. The decision followed criticism over the induction of his son, Junaid Zia, into the Pakistan national cricket team, and a broadcasting row involving PTV and GEO TV during a home series against New Zealand. He was succeeded by Shaharyar Khan.

=== Politics ===
In December 2007, Zia announced that he was joining the Pakistan Peoples Party (PPP) and filed nomination papers to contest the 2008 general election from the NA-127 Lahore constituency.
