= Najam Sethi =

Pakistani journalist and cricket administrator (born 1948)

Najam Aziz Sethi نجم عزیز سیٹھی
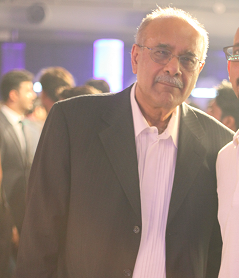
- Najam Sethi at the launch of PSL in 2015

Chairman of the Pakistan Cricket Board
- In office 23 December 2022 – 22 June 2023
- Appointed by: Shehbaz Sharif
- President: Arif Alvi
- Prime Minister: Shehbaz Sharif
- Preceded by: Ramiz Raja
- Succeeded by: Zaka Ashraf
- In office 10 August 2017 – 20 August 2018
- Appointed by: Nawaz Sharif
- President: Mamnoon Hussain
- Prime Minister: Nawaz Sharif; Imran Khan
- Preceded by: Shahryar Khan
- Succeeded by: Ehsan Mani
- In office 24 June 2013 – 16 May 2014
- Appointed by: Nawaz Sharif
- President: Mamnoon Hussain
- Prime Minister: Nawaz Sharif
- Preceded by: Zaka Ashraf
- Succeeded by: Shahryar Khan

Chairman of the Pakistan Super League
- In office 20 September 2015 – 20 August 2018
- Preceded by: Position established
- Succeeded by: Ehsan Mani

Caretaker Chief Minister of Punjab
- In office 27 March 2013 – 6 June 2013
- Preceded by: Shehbaz Sharif
- Succeeded by: Shehbaz Sharif

Chairman of Mitchell's
- In office 2020 – 10 November 2022
- Preceded by: S.M. Mohsin
- Succeeded by: Shahzad Ghaffar

CEO of Mitchell's
- Incumbent
- Assumed office 10 November 2022
- Preceded by: Naila Bhatti

Personal details
- Born: Najam Abdul Aziz Sethi; 20 May 1948 (age 78) Lahore, West Punjab, Pakistan (present-day Punjab, Pakistan)
- Spouse: Jugnu Mohsin (m. 1983)
- Children: Mira Sethi (daughter); Ali Sethi (son)
- Education: St. Anthony High School, Lahore
- Occupation: Journalist, TV Anchor
- Profession: Journalist; Businessman
- Known for: Editor-in-Chief The Friday Times
- Awards: CPJ International Press Freedom Award (1999); Golden Pen of Freedom Award Courage in Journalism Award, Amnesty International(2009); Hilal-i-Imtiaz Award in 2011
- Website: najamsethi.com

Najam Aziz Sethi (Punjabi, Urdu: نجم عزیز سیٹھی; born 20 May 1948) is a Pakistani journalist, businessman and former cricket administrator. He is the former chief executive officer (CEO) of Mitchell's. Previously, he served as the chairman of the Pakistan Cricket Board (PCB) in three different tenures and as a caretaker Federal Minister of Pakistan and as caretaker chief minister of Punjab. He is also the founder of The Friday Times and Vanguard Books.

As a journalist, he is a left-leaning political commentator who serves as the editor-in-chief of The Friday Times and formerly served as the chairman of the Pakistan Super League. He has also served as the caretaker chief minister of Punjab during the 2013 election. He formerly used to host primetime current affairs show Aapas ki Baat on Geo News. He was briefly the president of AAP Media Network / Indus News.

Najam Sethi began his sociopolitical endeavours with the socialist movement working for the rights of Balochistan, leading to his arrest in 1975 before being discharged in 1978. He consequently left politics and established Vanguard Books, a progressive book publishing company.

In 1989, Sethi along with his wife Jugnu Mohsin launched an independent English weekly, The Friday Times. He was arrested by the second Nawaz Sharif government in 1999 on trumped-up charges of treason before being released by the Supreme Court of Pakistan. In 2002, he founded the Daily Times of Pakistan and became its editor until leaving in October 2009. He also served as the Pakistan correspondent of The Economist from 1990 to 2008.

Sethi won the 1999 International Press Freedom Award of the US-based Committee to Protect Journalists and the 2009 World Association of Newspapers' Golden Pen of Freedom Award and Courage in Journalism Award from Amnesty International. On 26 March 2013, his name was approved for the interim position of the chief minister of Punjab as a result of consensus between members of the selection committee comprising individuals from both the governing and the opposing political parties. He took the oath on 27 March 2013, and left the office after the May 2013 elections on 6 June 2013.

== Early life and education ==
Sethi was born and raised in Lahore into a Punjabi family of the Khatri community. He graduated from Government College, Lahore (now Government College University), in 1967, earning the President's Gold Medal for achieving the highest academic distinction among more than 50,000 students of the University of the Punjab. He went on to complete a Master of Arts degree in Economics and Politics at the University of Cambridge in 1970. From 1971 to 1972, he was a PhD research student at Clare College, Cambridge. In 2011, Clare College named him Alumnus of the Year and awarded him an honorary Eric Lane Fellowship.

== Journalistic career ==
=== Early years ===
In 1984, he was detained for one month under "preventive detention" by the military regime of General Zia-ul-Haq, without being formally charged with any crime. The detention was widely believed to be linked to the publication of From Jinnah to Zia, a book released by Vanguard Books and authored by former chief justice of Pakistan, Mohammad Munir. In the book, Justice Munir reflected critically on his own role in validating Pakistan's first martial law in 1958, a precedent that many viewed as enabling General Zia's imposition of martial law in 1977.

According to Sethi, he first conceived of the idea for an independent Pakistani newspaper out of frustration: while briefly imprisoned in 1984 on trumped-up copyright charges, no newspapers had protested his arrest. The following year, he and Mohsin applied for a publishing licence under Mohsin's name, since Sethi was "too notorious an offender" to be use the application, Mohsin told him that she intended to publish "a social chit chat thing, you know, with lots of pictures of parties and weddings". It was finally approved in 1987, but Mohsin requested a one-year delay to avoid the first issue coming out during the dictatorship of General Zia ul Haq. The Friday Times' first issue appeared in May 1989.

=== 1999 arrest ===
In early 1999, Sethi gave an interview to a team for the BBC television show Correspondent, which was planning to report on corruption in the Nawaz Sharif government. At the beginning of May, he was warned by contacts that his co-operation with the team was being interpreted by the Nawaz Sharif government as an attempt to destabilize it and that officials were planning Sethi's arrest. On 8 May, he was taken from his home by personnel of Punjab Police. According to Sethi's wife Mohsin, at least eight armed officers broke into the house, assaulting the family's security guards; when asked to produce a warrant, one of them threatened simply to shoot Sethi on the spot. Mohsin was tied up and left locked in another room.

Sethi was then held for almost a month without charge. He was kept incommunicado at a detention center in Lahore. Amnesty International stated its belief that his arrest was connected with his investigations into government corruption, and designated him a prisoner of conscience. The US-based Committee to Protect Journalists also sent a protest letter to Prime Minister Nawaz Sharif, noting the organisation's dismay "that the state continues its persecution of independent journalists", and World Bank president James Wolfensohn called Sharif to urge Sethi's release.

On 1 June, authorities charged Sethi with "Condemnation of the Creation of the State and Advocacy of Abolition of its Sovereignty" and "Promoting Enmity Between Different Groups" and transferred him to police custody. However, the following day, the Supreme Court of Pakistan ruled that the government had provided insufficient evidence to justify Sethi's detention. He was released, and the charges against him were dropped.

=== My Feudal Lord ===
In June 1991, Mohsin and Sethi's publishing company, Vanguard Books, released Tehmina Durrani's My Feudal Lord, a "politically explosive" book about her marriage with leading politician Mustafa Khar. In the book, Durrani alleges that Khar mistreated and abused her. It was an "instant sensation" and later became the "hottest book in Pakistan's history". Durrani signed a contract vesting foreign rights with Mohsin and giving her 50% of foreign royalties.

On 19 May 1999, however—during Sethi's one-month incommunicado detention—Durrani called a press conference to denounce him as having stolen all of her earnings from the book, stating that his actions were "an even bigger case of hypocrisy than my experience with the feudal system". Durrani sued Sethi for mental torture, and he countersued for defamation. An earlier dispute over the foreign rights had been settled out of court in 1992. A review of the contracts by the UK newspaper The Independent described Sethi as acting in good faith and described him and Mohsin as "the injured party".

In 2008, when Sethi's newspapers ran a series of editorials opposing religious fundamentalism, the Taliban threatened him with death, causing him to live under constant guard. Sethi also received death threats in July 2008 for publishing an editorial cartoon showing Umme Hasaan, principal of a girls' school, encouraging young women in burqas to "kidnap Chinese masseuses". The joke referred to Lal Masjid, the fundamentalist Masjid at which her husband Abdul Aziz Ghazi was a cleric; the mosque had kidnapped six Chinese prostitutes, leading to Ghazi's arrest.

== Political career ==
=== Early activism in Balochistan (1970s) ===
While conducting research in Pakistan for his doctoral dissertation, he was detained as a political prisoner by the government of Zulfikar Ali Bhutto from 1975 to 1977, due to his opposition to military operations in Balochistan following the dismissal of elected provincial governments. Amnesty International recognized him as a political prisoner during this period. He was honorably released in 1978 when the government ordered the release of all political detainees. During the early 1970s Sethi had also been active in the Baloch armed insurgency as a fighter.

=== Minister for Political Affairs and Accountability (1996–1997) ===
He served as the Federal Minister for Political Affairs and Accountability in Pakistan's caretaker government from 1996 to 1997.

=== Caretaker Chief Minister of Punjab (2013) ===
Najam Sethi was appointed as the caretaker Chief Minister of Punjab on 26 March 2013, for the 2013 Pakistani general election, which were scheduled to be held on 11 May 2013. His name was presented by the opposition, PPP, and the governing party, PML(N) agreed on it. He was then chosen to be the caretaker chief minister. On 6 June 2013, he was replaced by the newly elected leader Shehbaz Sharif. PTI, the party that lost the 2013 elections, had accused Najam Sethi of fixing the elections in 35 constituencies and famously called them the 35 punctures.

== Administration career ==
=== Chairman of the Pakistan Cricket Board ===
==== First term (2013–2014) ====
Nawaz Sharif, the Prime minister at the time, appointed him as the acting chairman of the Pakistan Cricket Board after the Islamabad High Court ordered the appointment of an interim chairman until a pending case on the serving chairman, Zaka Ashraf, was decided. Later, a two-member bench of Islamabad high court cleared Zaka Ashraf and ordered his restoration as chairman PCB. Sethi then relinquished chairmanship.

==== Second term (2017–2018) ====
In August 2017, Sethi was elected unanimously as PCB chairman for a second time after no other member of the board of governors stood for the position. After Imran Khan was elected into power after the 2018 general elections, Najam Sethi resigned as Chairman of PCB. Shortly after his resignation, Imran Khan announced that former ICC President Ehsan Mani would succeed Sethi.

==== Third term (2022–2023) ====
After Imran Khan was ousted from government through a vote of no confidence in April 2022, Sethi was appointed the chairman of the PCB Management Committee for a third term in December 2022, along with 13 board members by the new prime minister, Shehbaz Sharif. They were given the task to restore the PCB's 2014 constitution, whilst scrapping the 2019 constitution set under Ehsan Mani, within four months. However in April 2023, the Management Committee was given a further two-month extension. On 20 June 2023, Najam Sethi made an announcement via twitter expressing his unwillingness to continue pursuing the Chairmanship during his third term as Chairman of the Pakistan Cricket Board (PCB). Citing concerns over potential instability and uncertainty, Sethi decided not to be considered as a candidate for the position. He was succeeded by Zaka Ashraf as the 37th chairman of the Pakistan Cricket Board on 5 July 2023.

== Personal life ==
Sethi is married to fellow journalist Jugnu Mohsin, the publisher of The Friday Times. Najam Sethi's son is writer and singer Ali Sethi while his daughter is journalist and actress Mira Sethi.

== Awards and recognition ==
In 1999, Sethi and Mohsin were both given the International Press Freedom Award of the US-based Committee to Protect Journalists, which recognises journalists who show courage in defending press freedom despite facing attacks, threats, or imprisonment. Ten years later, he was awarded the 2009 Golden Pen of Freedom, the annual press freedom prize of the World Association of Newspapers. He received the Hilal-i-Imtiaz Award in 2011 by the President of Pakistan.

== Books ==
Najam Sethi has authored several books, including:

- Troika Trouble: Pakistan Under Nawaz Sharif 1990-1993

This book examines the political dynamics and challenges during Nawaz Sharif's tenure as prime minister from 1990 to 1993, analyzing the events that led to the dismissal of his government.

- Troika Endgame: Pakistan Under Benazir Bhutto 1993-1996

An analysis of Benazir Bhutto's second term as prime minister, detailing the political strategies and circumstances that culminated in the end of her administration.

- Aik Safay Ki Badshahat: Imran Khan's Government 2018-2022

Written in Urdu, this book provides an account of the events during Imran Khan's tenure as prime minister from 2018 to 2022, focusing on the administration's policies and challenges.

Political offices Chief Minister of Punjab
Preceded by Shehbaz Sharif	Caretaker; 27 March 2013 – 6 June 2013	Succeeded by Shehbaz Sharif
