= Shahid Mahmood =

Pakistani cricketer (1939–2020)

Personal information
- Born: 17 March 1939; Lucknow, United Provinces, British India
- Died: 13 December 2020 (aged 81); New Jersey, U.S.
- Batting: Left-handed
- Bowling: Left-arm medium

International information
- National side: Pakistan
- Only Test (cap 40): 26 July 1962 v England

Career statistics
Competition	Tests	First-class
Matches	1	66
Runs scored	25	3117
Batting average	12.50	31.80
100s/50s	0/0	5/15
Top score	16	220
Balls bowled	36	5940
Wickets	0	89
Bowling average	-	21.65
5 wickets in innings	-	3
10 wickets in match	-	1
Best bowling	-	10/58
Catches/stumpings	0/-	25/-
- Source: ESPNCricinfo, 13 June 2017

Shahid Mahmood (Urdu: شاہد محمود) (17 March 1939 – 13 December 2020) was a Pakistani cricketer who played in one Test in 1962.

He played first-class cricket in Pakistan from 1957 to 1969. He played his only Test on the tour to England in 1962. In his last season, 1969–70, he became the first Pakistani bowler to take all ten wickets in a first-class innings.

Bureaucrat and cricket administrator I.A. Khan was his maternal uncle.

After retirement from cricket, he settled in the United States and died in New Jersey on 13 December 2020.
