= Bangladeshi cricket team in Pakistan in 2003 =

	Bangladesh	Pakistan
- Dates: 20 August – 21 September 2003
Captains	Khaled Mahmud	Rashid Latif (Test series); Inzamam ul Haq (ODI series)

Test series
- Result: Pakistan won the 3-match series 3–0
Most runs	Habibul Bashar (379)	Yasir Hameed (373)
Most wickets	Mohammad Rafique (17)	Shabbir Ahmed (17)
- Player of the series: Yasir Hameed (Pak)

One Day International series
- Results: Pakistan won the 5-match series 5–0
Most runs	Rajin Saleh (211)	Mohammad Yousuf (366)
Most wickets	Tapash Baisya (6); Mohammad Rafique (6)	Umar Gul (11)
- Player of the series: Mohammad Yousuf (Pak)

The Bangladesh national cricket team toured Pakistan in 2003 to play three Test and five One Day International (ODI) matches. This was Bangladesh's second tour to Pakistan, with the first occurring in 2001–02, when the teams played one Test match. This series was the first international Test cricket series to be held in Pakistan after a 15-month absence due to security concerns. Pakistan announced their squad and included 7 new players without any previous Test cricket experience, after many senior players, such as Wasim Akram, Waqar Younis and Saeed Anwar) retired after 2003 ICC Cricket World Cup.

Both series ended in whitewash, with Pakistan winning the test series 3 – 0 and the ODI series 5 – 0. During the Second Test, Bangladesh's Alok Kapali became the first Bangladeshi and the 32nd cricketer overall to take a Test hat-trick. Pakistan captain, Rashid Latif, was banned for 5 One Day Internationals after the test series for falsely claiming a dropped catch. Therefore, Inzamam-ul-Haq captained the team in the ODI series.

== Squads ==
Bangladesh	Pakistan	
Tests and ODIs: Khaled Mahmud (c); Hannan Sarkar; Habibul Bashar; Sanwar Hossain; Mohammad Ashraful; Rajin Saleh; Alok Kapali; Mohammad Rafique; Khaled Mashud (wk); Tapash Baisya; Alamgir Kabir; Mashrafe Mortaza; Javed Omar (Test); Anwar Hossain (Test); Manjural Islam Rana (Test); Tushar Imran (ODI); Hasibul Hossain (ODI); Mushfiqur Rahman (ODI)	Tests: Rashid Latif (c), (wk); Inzamam-ul-Haq; Mohammad Hafeez; Taufeeq Umar; Yasir Hameed; Mohammad Yousuf; Younis Khan; Salman Butt; Saqlain Mushtaq; Umar Gul; Shabbir Ahmed; Shoaib Akhtar; Saqlain Mushtaq; Mohammad Khalil; Asim Kamal; Danish Kaneria; Misbah-ul-Haq; Yasir Ali; Farhan Adil; Saeed Bin Nasir	ODIs: Inzamam-ul-Haq (c); Kamran Akmal (wk); Mohammad Hafeez; Imran Nazir; Yasir Hameed; Mohammad Yousuf; Younis Khan; Salman Butt; Umar Gul; Shabbir Ahmed; Mohammad Sami; Abdul Razzaq; Shoaib Malik; Danish Kaneria; Junaid Zia; Abdur Rauf

== Test series ==
=== 1st Test ===
20–24 August 2003
Scorecard

Bangladesh	v	Pakistan
288 (86.3 overs); Habibul Bashar 71 (72); Danish Kaneria 3/58 (21 overs)		346 (117 overs); Yasir Hameed 170 (253); Mashrafe Mortaza 3/68 (19 overs)
274 (114.1 overs); Habibul Bashar 108 (218); Shabbir Ahmed 5/48 (18.1 overs)		217/3 (70 overs); Yasir Hameed 105 (161); Mohammad Rafique 2/61 (26 overs)

Pakistan won by 7 wickets
National Stadium, Karachi
Umpires: Steve Bucknor (WI) and Tyron Wijewardene (SRI)
Player of the match: Yasir Hameed (Pak)

- Pakistan won the toss and elected to field.
- Yasir Hameed, Mohammed Hafeez, Umar Gul, Shabbir Ahmed (Pak) and Rajin Saleh (Ban) all made their Test debuts.
- Yasir Hameed became the second batsman in Test cricket (after Lawrence Rowe) to score centuries in both innings on Test debut, and the fourth Pakistani to score centuries in both innings of a Test match.

=== 2nd Test ===
27–31 August 2003 (Note: While five days of play were scheduled for each test, second and third Test reached a result in four days.)
Scorecard

Bangladesh	v	Pakistan
361 (137.5 overs); Javed Omar 119 (357); Shoaib Akhtar 6/50 (22.5 overs)		295 (108.1 overs); Taufeeq Umar 75 (151); Mohammad Rafique 5/118 (45 overs)
96 (33.5 overs); Habibul Bashar 28 (32); Shoaib Akhtar 4/30 (12 overs)		165/1 (47.3 overs); Mohammad Hafeez 102 (144); Khaled Mahmud 1/28 (14 overs)

Pakistan won by 9 wickets
Arbab Niaz Stadium, Peshawar
Umpires: Steve Bucknor (WI) and Russell Tiffin (Zim)
Player of the match: Shoaib Akhtar (Pak)

- Bangladesh won the toss and elected to bat.
- Alok Kapali became the first Bangladeshi cricketer and the 32nd overall to take a Test hat-trick.

=== 3rd Test ===
3–7 September 2003
Scorecard

Bangladesh	v	Pakistan
281 (99.2 overs); Habibul Bashar 72 (153); Umar Gul 4/86 (32 overs)		175 (54.4 overs); Yasir Hameed 39 (90); Mohammad Rafique 5/36 (17.4 overs)
154 (46.3 overs); Rajin Saleh 42 (73); Umar Gul 4/58 (15 overs)		262/9 (91 overs); Inzamam-ul-Haq 138* (232); Khaled Mahmud 3/68 (28 overs)

Pakistan won by 1 wicket
Multan Cricket Stadium, Multan
Umpires: Asoka de Silva (SL) and Russell Tiffin (Zim)
Player of the match: Inzamam-ul-Haq (Pak)

- Bangladesh won the toss and elected to bat.
- Salman Butt, Farhan Adil and Yasir Ali (Pak) all made their Test debuts.

== ODI series ==
=== 1st ODI ===
9 September 2003
Scorecard

Pakistan; 323/3 (50 overs)	v	Bangladesh; 186 (43.2 overs)
Yasir Hameed 116 (132); Alok Kapali 1/44 (7 overs)		Mushfiqur Rahman 36* (65); Mohammad Hafeez 3/17 (6.2 overs)

Pakistan won by 137 runs
Multan Cricket Stadium, Multan
Umpires: Aleem Dar (Pak) and Russell Tiffin (Zim)
Player of the match: Yasir Hameed (Pak)

- Pakistan won the toss and elected to bat.
- Junaid Zia (Pak) and Rajin Saleh (Ban) both made their ODI debuts.

=== 2nd ODI ===
12 September 2003
Scorecard

Pakistan; 243/8 (50 overs)	v	Bangladesh; 169 (42.1 overs)
Mohammad Yousuf 102 (127); Rajin Saleh 3/48 (9 overs)		Rajin Saleh 64 (93); Junaid Zia 3/21 (4.1 overs)

Pakistan won by 74 runs
Iqbal Stadium, Faisalabad
Umpires: Aleem Dar (Pak) and Russell Tiffin (Zim)
Player of the match: Mohammad Yousuf (Pak)

- Pakistan won the toss and elected to bat.

=== 3rd ODI ===
15 September 2003 (D/N)
Scorecard

Pakistan; 257/9 (50 overs)	v	Bangladesh; 201/9 (44 overs)
Mohammad Yousuf 65 (74); Tapash Baisya 4/56 (9 overs)		Alok Kapali 61 (70); Umar Gul 5/17 (9 overs)

Pakistan won by 42 runs (D/L method)
Gaddafi Stadium, Lahore
Umpires: Nadeem Ghauri (Pak) and Russell Tiffin (Zim)
Player of the match: Umar Gul (Pak)

- Pakistan won the toss and elected to bat.
- Floodlights failure during Bangladesh's innings, reduced the target to 244 runs from 44 overs.
- Umar Gul (Pak) took his maiden 5-wicket haul in ODIs.

=== 4th ODI ===
18 September 2003 (D/N)
Scorecard

Bangladesh; 222/8 (50 overs)	v	Pakistan; 226/5 (49.5 overs)
Rajin Saleh 47 (92); Umar Gul 2/29 (9 overs)		Mohammad Yousuf 94* (131); Tapash Baisya 2/42 (8.5 overs)

Pakistan won by 5 wickets
Rawalpindi Cricket Stadium, Rawalpindi
Umpires: Aleem Dar (Pak) and Russell Tiffin (Zim)
Player of the match: Mohammad Yousuf (Pak)

- Bangladesh won the toss and elected to bat.

=== 5th ODI ===
21 September 2003 (D/N)
Scorecard

Pakistan; 302/5 (50 overs)	v	Bangladesh; 244/7 (50 overs)
Yasir Hameed 82 (107); Mashrafe Mortaza 2/63 (9 overs)		Alok Kapali 69 (86); Mohammad Sami 2/50 (9 overs)

Pakistan won by 58 runs
National Stadium, Karachi
Umpires: Nadeem Ghauri (Pak) and Russell Tiffin (Zim)
Player of the match: Yasir Hameed (Pak)

- Pakistan won the toss and elected to bat.
