= Jugnu Mohsin =

Pakistani politician and journalist (born 1959)

Member of the Provincial Assembly of the Punjab
- In office 15 August 2018 – 14 January 2023
- Constituency: PP-184 Okara-II

Personal details
- Born: Syeda Memnat Hussain; 1959 (age 66–67) Lahore, Punjab, Pakistan
- Party: PMLN (2022–2025)
- Other political affiliations: IND (2018-2022)
- Spouse: Najam Sethi (m. 1983)
- Children: Mira Sethi and Ali Sethi
- Relatives: Moni Mohsin (sister); Syed Zulfiqar Bokhari (uncle); Syed Iftikhar Bokhari (uncle); Syeda Sughra Imam (niece); Syed Fakhar Imam (cousin); Syeda Abida Hussain (cousin)
- Known for: Progressivism, Women's development
- Awards: CPJ International Press Freedom Award (1999)

Syeda Maimanat Mohsin, commonly known as Jugnu Mohsin (Note: Punjabi: جگنو محسن/ਜੁਗਨੂ ਮੋਹਸਿਨ, Punjabi pronunciation: [d͡ʒʊɡnuː moːɦsɪn(ə̆)].) (Punjabi: جگنو محسن, pronounced [d͡ʒʊɡnuː moːɦsɪn(ə̆)]; born 1959), is a Pakistani politician and journalist. She was an independent member of the Provincial Assembly of Punjab until 31 March 2022 and then joined Pakistan Muslim League (Nawaz) on 1 April 2022. Her term ended on 14 January 2023.

Previously, she served as an editor of The Friday Times and Good Times. She previously hosted a weekly talk show, Jugnu.

Mohsin studied law at the University of Cambridge, where she met and, in 1983, married journalist Najam Sethi, a left-leaning activist and editor-in-chief of The Friday Times. She had to navigate family opposition in order to marry Sethi. However, she was able to convince her family to accept him. The couple has two children, Mira Sethi and Ali Sethi.

In 1999, Najam was arrested by the Nawaz Sharif government for his work as a journalist and held for a month without charge, causing Mohsin to launch an international campaign for his release. That year, she and Sethi were awarded the International Press Freedom Award by the Committee to Protect Journalists.

She was elected to represent a Punjab Assembly constituency (PP-184 of Okara District) during the 2018 elections. She obtained 62,506 votes.

== Early life and education ==
She was born as Syeda Maimanat Mohsin to a landed gentry family.

She received her early education at the Convent of Jesus and Mary, Lahore and took her A-levels at the Moreton Hall School. She received her law degree from the University of Cambridge and was called to the Bar at Gray's Inn, London.

== Journalism career ==
In 1984, Sethi was imprisoned on a charge of copyright, but no Pakistani newspaper had protested the arrest. This led to Mohsin and Sethi wishing to commence their own independent newspaper. Sethi's name carried some infamy, and so they applied for a publishing licence under Mohsin's name.

When called into Nawaz Sharif's office to discuss the application, Jugnu Mohsin told him that she intended to publish "a social chit chat thing, you know, with lots of pictures of parties and weddings". It was finally approved in 1987, but Mohsin requested a one-year delay to avoid the first issue coming out during the dictatorship of General Zia ul Haq. The paper's first issue appeared in May 1989.

In 2004, Jugnu Mohsin said that President General Musharraf could be a bridge to democracy.

=== 1999 kidnapping incident ===
In early 1999, Sethi gave an interview to a journalist from the BBC television program, Correspondent. The program planned to expose corruption in the Pakistani government. At the beginning of May 1999, Sethi was warned that his arrest was imminent. On 8 May 1999, Sethi was taken from his home by government agents.

Mohsin said at least eight armed officers broke into their house; the family's security guards were assaulted; and no warrant was shown. Sethi was threatened, and she was tied up and left locked in another room. Sethi was held for almost a month without charge. He was kept in the custody of the army intelligence group, Inter-Services Intelligence, in Lahore.

Mohsin publicly campaigned for his release and continued to publish the Friday Times. Amnesty International stated that Sethi's arrest was connected with his investigations into government corruption, and designated him a prisoner of conscience. The US-based Committee to Protect Journalists sent a letter of protest to Prime Minister Nawaz Sharif, noting the organisation's dismay "that [Pakistan] continues its persecution of independent journalists". The World Bank president, James Wolfensohn, called Sharif to urge for Sethi's release.

On 1 June 1999, the Pakistan government charged Sethi with "condemnation of the creation of the State and advocacy of the abolition of its sovereignty" and "promoting enmity between different groups". Sethi was transferred to the custody of the police. However, the following day, the Supreme Court of Pakistan ruled that the government had not provided sufficient evidence to justify Sethi's detention. Sethi was released, and the charges against him were dropped. Mohsin and Sethi received the International Press Freedom Award from the Committee to Protect Journalists.

=== My Feudal Lord book controversy ===
In June 1991, Mohsin and Sethi's publishing company, Vanguard Books, released Tehmina Durrani's My Feudal Lord. The book recounts her marriage to the politician and Punjab landlord, Mustafa Khar. In the book, Durrani alleges that Khar mistreated and abused her. Durrani signed a contract with Mohsin, giving Mohsin foreign rights and fifty percent of foreign royalties.

On 19 May 1999, however, during Sethi's detention, Durrani said at a press conference that Sethi had stolen all of her earnings from the book. She said his actions were "an even bigger case of hypocrisy than my experience with the feudal system". Durrani sued Sethi for mental torture, and he counter-sued for defamation. An earlier dispute over the foreign rights had been settled out of court in 1992. A review of the contracts by the UK newspaper The Independent described Sethi as having acted in good faith and described him and Mohsin as "the injured party".

=== Newspaper satire ===
During the rule of President Pervez Musharraf, Mohsin wrote a monthly humour column titled "Mush and Bush" featuring fictional conversations between the Pakistani President and the US President, George W. Bush. She had previously targeted Prime Minister Nawaz Sharif with a column for his "dim and authoritarian personality" and "his intolerance of dissent". Mohsin's sister, Moni Mohsin, satirises the country's social elites with another column for the paper, "Diary of a Social Butterfly".

== Political views ==
Mohsin advocates for a liberal Pakistan and opposes religious fundamentalism. In January 2006, she argued for the right of women to participate in a marathon wearing shorts instead of the shalwar kameez. Mohsin is a member of the Women's Action Forum of Pakistan organization. She later became a major critic of Imran Khan's entry into politics. However, in 2018, after being elected as a member of the Provincial Assembly of the Punjab, she supported his party, Pakistan Tehreek-e-Insaf. On 1 April 2022, she joined the Pakistan Muslim League (Nawaz) prior to the no-confidence motion against Imran Khan.

== See also ==
- List of Pakistani journalists
