= Farhan Adil =

Pakistani cricketer (born 1977)

Personal information
- Full name: Farhan Adil
- Born: 25 September 1977 (age 49); Karachi, Pakistan
- Batting: Right-handed
- Bowling: Right-arm offbreak

International information
- National side: Pakistan (2003)
- Only Test (cap 177): 3 September 2003 v Bangladesh

Career statistics
Competition	Test	First-class
Matches	1	107
Runs scored	33	5,326
Batting average	16.50	35.74
100s/50s	0/0	9/23
Top score	25	211
Balls bowled	–	295
Wickets	–	1
Bowling average	–	199.00
5 wickets in innings	–	0
10 wickets in match	–	0
Best bowling	–	1/70
Catches/stumpings	0/–	53/–
- Source: ESPNCricinfo, 9 June 2017

Farhan Adil (Urdu: فرحان عادل), (born 25 September 1977) is a Pakistani former cricketer who played for the Pakistan national cricket team in his only test cricket match in 2003. He was a right-handed batsman and a right-arm offbreak bowler.

Adil has been associated with the middle-order of Karachi Cricket Association and Habib Bank for the last six years, and holds a steady first-class average in the mid-thirties. Having performed well during the Pakistan A tour of United Arab Emirates, he was picked for the Test squad, making his debut against Bangladesh in the third Test in 2003 he scored 33 in his two innings both times being dismissed by Mohammad Rafique. In the summer of 2007, Adil joined club side Chudleigh who play in the Devon Premier League.
