= Syed Iftikhar Bokhari =

Pakistani cricketer and politician (1935–2021)

Member of the Senate of Pakistan
- In office March 1988 – March 1991
- Constituency: Punjab

Personal details
- Born: 6 July 1935 Lahore, British India
- Died: 10 November 2021 (aged 86)
- Citizenship: Pakistani
- Relatives: Syed Zulfiqar Bokhari (brother); Jugnu Mohsin (niece)
- Cricket career

Cricket information
- Batting: Right-handed
- Bowling: Right-arm medium

Domestic team information
- Years: Team
- 1957: Cambridge University
- 1957–58: Punjab
- 1958–59 to 1964–65: Lahore
- 1964–65: Sargodha

Career statistics
Competition	First-class
Matches	19
Runs scored	959
Batting average	36.88
100s/50s	3/3
Top score	203*
Balls bowled	44
Wickets	0
Bowling average	–
5 wickets in innings	–
10 wickets in match	–
Best bowling	–
Catches/stumpings	4/–
- Source: CricketArchive, 2 April 2015

Syed Iftikhar Ali Bokhari (6 July 1935 – 10 November 2021), also known as I. A. Bokhari, was a Pakistani politician and cricketer. He was a member of the Senate of Pakistan between March 1988 and March 1991. He played 19 matches of first-class cricket between 1952 and 1966.

== Early life and education ==
Bokhari was born on 6 July 1935 in Lahore, British India, to the Syed family of Jhang. He received his early education from Aitchison College. He received his bachelor's and master's degrees from the University of Cambridge.

== Cricket career ==
Bokhari made his first-class debut in 1951–52 at the age of 16, opening the batting for the Punjab Governor's XI against Punjab University. As "I.A. Bokhari", he spent a year at school in England at King's Ely, where he scored 453 runs and took 19 wickets in 1953. He went up to Cambridge University later that year. He appeared in the freshmen's match in 1954 alongside his compatriot Shaharyar Khan, but neither was selected for the university team. He played for Cambridgeshire in the Minor Counties Championship in 1956, scoring 649 runs in seven matches at an average of 72.11, and won the competition's batting award. He eventually played one match for Cambridge University, the first match of 1957, but without success.

Returning to Pakistan, Bokhari played two matches as an opening batsman for Punjab in the Quaid-e-Azam Trophy in 1957–58, and two for Lahore in 1958–59, with a top score of 27. He was in outstanding form for Lahore in the inaugural season of the Ayub Trophy in 1960–61. In the first match he became the first player to score a double century in the Ayub Trophy when he scored 203 not out against Punjab University; in the semi-final he made 0 and 100 not out against Rawalpindi and Peshawar; in the final he made 50 (Lahore's top score) and 4 not out, to finish the competition as the leading batsman with 357 runs at 178.50.

Bokhari scored his last first-class century in the first match of the 1961–62 season, when he made 106 against Multan. He played one match for Sargodha, captaining them in the Ayub Trophy in 1964–65, when he top-scored in both innings in a low-scoring match with 17 and 45 against Combined Services.

== Political career ==
Bokhari was elected to the Senate of Pakistan in 1985. He served between March 1988 and March 1991.
