= The Friday Times =

Pakistani English-language independent newsweekly

- Editor: Raza Rumi (since 2021)
- Former editors: Najam Sethi (1989–2021)
- Format: Online; Print (defunct)
- Founder: Jugnu Mohsin; Najam Sethi
- Founded: 1987
- First issue: May 1989; 37 years ago
- Final issue: 2021
- Company: Naya Daur Media
- Country: Pakistan
- Based in: Lahore
- Language: English
- Website: thefridaytimes.com

The Friday Times (TFT) is a Pakistani English-language online publication based in Lahore, Pakistan.

== History ==
The Friday Times was first published in May 1989. TFT's founder-editor Najam Sethi and publisher Jugnu Mohsin, a husband-and-wife team, are recipients of international awards conferred by Amnesty International and the Committee to Protect Journalists. In 2009, Sethi also won the Golden Pen of Freedom, the annual press freedom prize of the World Association of Newspapers.

According to Sethi, he first conceived of the idea for an independent Pakistani newspaper out of frustration: while briefly imprisoned in 1984 on trumped-up copyright charges, no newspapers had protested his arrest. The following year, he and Mohsin applied for a publishing license (called 'declaration' under the relevant Pakistani press law) under Mohsin's name, since Sethi was "too notorious an offender" to be approved. Called into Nawaz Sharif's office to discuss the application, Mohsin told him that she intended to publish "a social chit chat thing, you know, with lots of pictures of parties and weddings". It was finally approved in 1987, but Mohsin requested a one-year delay to avoid the first issue coming out during the dictatorship of General Zia ul Haq. The paper's first issue appeared in May 1989.

During the rule of President Pervez Musharraf, Mohsin wrote a monthly humor column titled "Mush and Bush" featuring fictional conversations between the president and US President George W. Bush. She had previously targeted Prime Minister Sharif with a column for his "dim and authoritarian personality, his intolerance of dissent". Her sister, Moni Mohsin, satirizes the country's social elites with another column for the paper, "Diary of a Social Butterfly".

Mohsin advocates a liberal Pakistan and opposes religious fundamentalism. In January 2006, she argued for the right of women to participate in a marathon wearing shorts instead the salwar kameez.

== See also ==
- List of newspapers in Pakistan
