= Aapas ki Baat (talk show) =

- Created by: Geo Jang group
- Directed by: geo direction
- Presented by: Muneeb Farooq (2011-2023)
- Starring: Najam Sethi (2011-2018)
- Country of origin: Pakistan
- Original language: Urdu
- No. of episodes: 2777

Production
- Production locations: Islamabad, Pakistan
- Running time: 44–47 minutes

Original release
- Network: Geo News
- Release: 5 January 2011 – 2023

Aapas ki Baat Najam Sethi Kay Sath (in Urdu:اپس کی بات نجم سیٹھی کے ساتھ) is an airing show on Geo News which airs from Monday to Thursday at 11:00pm–12:00am. The show gives political analysis on current affairs of Pakistan. The show cast also predicts about future of political affairs in show under the given limits and code of conduct of channel. This airing show is considered to be one of the most successful and popular airing show of country. Aapas ki Baat is a discussion-based talk show which is different from usual format of Pakistani talk shows. Najam Sethi expresses his views in and draws attention to the happenings in the political area of Pakistan.

== History ==
It was first aired on 5 January 2011, with co-hosts Muneeb Farooq and journalist Najam Sethi.

By 2013, the program had gained prominence in Pakistan's Urdu media, notable for its liberal perspective in a landscape predominantly featuring right-wing narratives. The show's format, characterized by its analytical approach and avoidance of sensationalist presentation, attracted a diverse audience, including both liberal and conservative viewers.

Najam Sethi, known for his informed and articulate discussions, often cites a variety of sources, colloquially referred to as "chirya", to provide insights into political developments. A significant portion of the predictions made on the show, attributed to these sources, were noted to be accurate by early 2013.

In December 2013, the program highlighted a critical analysis of Pakistan's Interior Minister Chaudhry Nisar's comments on the execution of Abdul Qadir Molla, a member of Jamat-i-Islami, in Bangladesh. Molla was executed for his role in the 1971 Bangladesh Liberation War. Sethi's critique focused on Nisar's use of nationalist rhetoric and its historical parallels, reflecting the show's commitment to providing a comprehensive analysis of political events.
