= State Guest House (Pakistan) =

Former official residence of Prime Minister of Pakistan

10 Victoria Road, Karachi
- Interactive map of the 10 Victoria Road, Karachi area

General information
- Location: Abdullah Haroon Road, Karachi, Pakistan
- Coordinates: 24.848299°N 67.030457°E
- Construction started: 1947
- Owner: Government of Pakistan

10 Victoria Road, Karachi, now known as State Guest House, is a state guest house located on Abdullah Haroon Road in Karachi. It was the official residence of the prime minister of Pakistan until 1968 when Prime Minister House was constructed in Islamabad. It was modelled after 10 Downing Street.

== History ==
The house was named as 10 Victoria Road by Ra'ana Liaquat Ali Khan.

During the premiership of Liaquat Ali Khan, his spouse, Ra'ana Liaquat Ali Khan founded All Pakistan Women's Association and used to held its conferences at 10 Victoria Road.

== Former residents ==
- Liaquat Ali Khan
- Khawaja Nazimuddin
- Mohammad Ali Bogra
- Chaudhry Mohammad Ali
- Huseyn Shaheed Suhrawardy
