= Raza Rumi =

Pakistani journalist and policy analyst

- Education: London School of Economics
- Website: razarumi.com

Raza Ahmad Rumi is a Pakistani Policy analyst and journalist. He is currently the editor of the Friday Times and chief editor of the online media platform Naya Daur Media.

== Family ==
Rumi is the son of Sheikh Riaz Ahmad, who served as chief justice of the Supreme Court of Pakistan during the military rule of General Pervez Musharraf.

He has been a development practitioner for more than two decades. He is Visiting Faculty at Cornell Institute for Public Affairs (now part of Brooks School of Public Policy) and has taught earlier at Ithaca College and New York University. Rumi has been a fellow at New America Foundation (2014); United States Institute of Peace (Sept 2014-March 2015) and a visiting fellow at National Endowment for Democracy. He is also a member of a think tank at the Laboratory for Global Performance and Politics, at the School of Foreign Service, Georgetown University.

== Journalism ==
As a journalist, Rumi was affiliated with the Daily Times (Pakistan). He has a longtime affiliation with The Friday Times, Pakistan's foremost liberal weekly paper, as a writer and an editor for a decade. Rumi is also a commentator for several publications which include Foreign Policy, Huffington Post, New York Times, The Diplomat, Fair Observer, CNN and Al Jazeera, Daily O, Scroll India, The Hindu, Indian Express, The News, Dawn, and Express Tribune.

In Pakistan, he also worked in the broadcast media as an analyst and hosted talk shows at Capital TV and Express News. Rumi was also a Director at Jinnah Institute, a public policy think tank and Executive Director of Justice Network - a coalition of NGOs.

== Development & Policy Work ==
Prior to his foray into journalism and public affairs, Rumi worked at the Asian Development Bank as a governance specialist. His areas of focus included decentralization, access to justice, and institutional development, and he led projects in several South and Southeast Asian countries. At ADB, he also edited two publications on public administration and participatory budget making. Later, as an international development professional, Raza has also worked on designing and implementing projects for UK's Department For International Development, UNDP, UNICEF World Bank, among others. Until recently, Raza also led the Network for Asia Pacific Schools & Institutes of Public Administration and Governance. His academic papers have covered areas such as federalism, public policy choices, access to justice, citizen rights, etc.

Raza's work as a public policy practitioner builds on his stint with the Government of Pakistan's Administrative Service and United Nations Peacekeeping Mission in Kosovo where he acted as a municipal administrator in charge of local governance.

In 1994, he entered the Pakistani civil service after topping the countrywide competitive examination. He served as an Assistant Commissioner in Wazirabad, Murree, Sahiwal and Sargodha subdivisions in the Punjab Province of Pakistan and was a Municipal Administrator and magistrate in multiple jurisdictions.

== Education ==
Raza graduated from Aitchison College, Lahore in 1988 and was awarded the Jubilee Medal. He holds a bachelor's degree in Economics: International Trade and Development and a master's degree in Social Policy and Planning in Developing Countries, both from the London School of Economics.

== Career ==
During 1992-1994 Raza Ahmad Rumi worked as a Social Scientist with the Aga Khan Rural Support Programme. In 1994, he joined the Pakistan civil service and worked in the field. He topped the CSS examination and was also declared as the best probationer in 1996 at the Civil Services Academy (DMG campus). From 2000-2002, he was part of the United Nations Mission in Kosovo as a peacekeeper. In 2002, he joined the Asian Development Bank as a Governance Specialist and worked in the Asia Pacific region on governance and capacity development programmes and projects.

In 2012, Rumi became director of the Jinnah Institute, a policy think tank.

In 2014, he moved to the United States and has been affiliated with multiple think tanks and academia, including Ithaca College, Cornell University and City University of New York.

== Assassination attempt ==
On 28 March 2014, Raza was attacked by a group of assailants, reportedly members of the Taliban-affiliate Lashkar-e-Jhangvi for his anti-LeJ views. Raza survived the attack, but his driver, Mustafa, was killed. On this incident, the former director of Human Rights Watch wrote: "Miraculously, he emerged unscathed from the hail of gunfire intended for him. Raza is now in a secure location—outside Pakistan. He had no choice but to leave as the authorities felt no embarrassment in letting him know that they could not guarantee his life if he stepped outside his Lahore home. Some weeks later, the police “caught” the would-be-assassins who belong to the dreaded Taliban-affiliate Lashkar-e-Jhangvi. But police custody curtails neither the power of these terrorists nor the impunity with which they kill."

== Books authored ==
He is the author of several books:

- Delhi by Heart: Impressions of a Pakistani Traveller, ISBN 9350294184
- The Fractious Path: Pakistan’s Democratic Transition, ISBN 9351777308
- Identity, Faith and Conflict, ASIN B01MTZEI91
- Being Pakistani: Society Culture and the Arts, ISBN 9352776054 a collection of essays published in June 2018 by Harper Collins, India.
- Rethinking Pakistan: A 21st Century Perspective, ISBN 9781785274923
- The Role of Public Administration in Building a Harmonious Society, ISBN 9789715616164
