= Shabbir Ahmed (cricketer) =

Pakistani cricketer

Personal information
- Full name: Shabbir Ahmed
- Born: 21 April 1976 (age 50); Khanewal, Punjab, Pakistan
- Height: 1.96 m (6 ft 5 in)
- Batting: Right-handed
- Bowling: Right-arm fast-medium
- Role: Bowler

International information
- National side: Pakistan (1999–2007)
- Test debut (cap 174): 20 August 2003 v Bangladesh
- Last Test: 12 November 2005 v England
- ODI debut (cap 127): 19 September 1999 v West Indies
- Last ODI: 22 May 2005 v West Indies
- Only T20I (cap 14): 2 February 2007 v South Africa

Career statistics
Competition	Test	ODI	FC	LA
Matches	10	32	100	128
Runs scored	88	10	1,144	474
Batting average	8.80	1.66	10.49	10.53
100s/50s	0/0	0/0	0/1	0/0
Top score	24*	2	50	42
Balls bowled	2,576	1,642	18,713	6,573
Wickets	51	53	406	167
Bowling average	23.03	36.12	22.32	28.92
5 wickets in innings	2	0	19	0
10 wickets in match	0	0	0	0
Best bowling	5/48	3/32	7/70	4/23
Catches/stumpings	3/–	10/–	34/–	26/–
- Source: ESPNcricinfo, 10 December 2013

Shabbir Ahmed Khan (Urdu: شببر احمد خان; born 21 April 1976) is a Pakistani former cricketer who played for the Pakistani national cricket team between 2003 and 2007. HIs cricketing career was disrupted by a one-year ban for an illegal bowling action.

He was a line-and-length pace bowler who took eight wickets for 109 runs on his Test debut against Bangladesh in the first of their 2003–04 three-Test series, including five wickets in the second innings. On his one-day International debut, he picked up three wickets (all three bowled out) with two wickets in his first over, against the West Indies at Toronto.

== Style ==
Shabbir Ahmed is a tall (6'5"), Pakistani fast bowler. He seams and cuts more than he swings, often sharply and both ways and is a sound exponent of reverse swing.

== One year ban ==
Shabbir had taken 51 wickets in 10 tests, when in 2005 after playing the first Test against England he was reported to the ICC for an illegal bowling action. Following an investigation into his action, Ahmed was banned from cricket for one year in December 2005.

== Return to cricket ==
As of 21 December 2006, having completed his one-year term, Shabbir was once again eligible to play International Cricket. However, the clause was that if Shabbir was reported again, he would be suspended from bowling at international level until his action is reassessed.

Shabbir played in the Pakistani domestic competition till 2013 after which he called it quits.

== See also ==
- List of Pakistan cricketers who have taken five-wicket hauls on Test debut
