= Moni Mohsin =

British-Pakistani writer

Personal details
- Born: Syeda Matanat Ghaffar; September 1963 (age 62)
- Occupation: Writer, freelancer journalist
- Known for: Newspaper columnist for The Friday Times, The Guardian

Syeda Matanat Ghaffar (born September 1963), commonly known as Moni Mohsin, is a British-Pakistani writer based in London, United Kingdom. She wrote a long running satirical column "The Diary of a Social Butterfly" for The Friday Times and a book with the same name.

== Early life and career ==
Mohsin grew up in Lahore, Pakistan and describes herself as being from a family of "educated, westernised people". When General Zia ul-Haq came to power in a coup in 1977, her family began to feel less comfortable in the new, religious Pakistan, where political repression against nonconformists became routine, but she chose to remain in Lahore. Mohsin left Pakistan at age 16 to study at a boarding school in England, and later attended Cambridge University, where she studied anthropology and archaeology. After General Zia's death in 1988, she moved more decisively into the public sphere, working for the country's first independent magazine Friday Times, where she rose to the ranks of features editor. Her sister, Jugnu Mohsin, is the publisher of The Friday Times, an independent Pakistani newsweekly. She is aunt of Ali Sethi and Mira Sethi.

Mohsin is often invited in the panel of literary festivals. She was also included among the panel of judges for The Zeenat Haroon Rashid Writing Prize for Women.

== Publications ==
Mohsin is author of two novels: The End of Innocence (2006) and Tender Hooks aka Duty Free (2011), and two books of collected columns: The Diary of a Social Butterfly (2008) and The Return of the Butterfly (2014). Her writings have also appeared in The Times of India, The Guardian, Prospect, The Nation, 1843 (The Economist), Boston Review, NPR, Herald and other publications.

Mohsin is working as a freelancer and writes about class, politics, culture, society and lifestyle.
