= Abdullah Haroon =

Pakistan movement leader (1872-1942)

Sir Abdullah Haroon
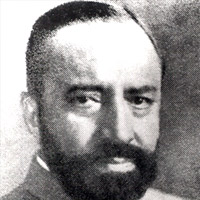
- Born: Abdullah Haroon (Urdu: عبداللہ ہارون); 1872; Karachi, British India
- Died: 27 April 1942 (aged 69–70); Karachi, British India
- Known for: Politics (Pakistan Movement leader), Philanthropy
- Spouse: Lady Abdullah Haroon
- Children: Yusuf Haroon, Mahmoud Haroon, and Zeenat Haroon Rashid

Sir Abdullah Haroon (1 January 1872 – 27 April 1942) (Urdu: عبداللہ ہارون) (also spelled Seth Haji Sir Abdoola Haroon) was a British Indian politician and businessman who made major contributions towards developing and defining the role of Muslims in economic, educational, social and political fields in the Indian subcontinent.

== Early life and political career ==
Abdullah Haroon was born into a Sindhi Memon family in 1872 at Karachi, British India. He lost his father at an early age of four and was raised by his grandmother who was a deeply religious lady. Early in his life, he worked as an 'assistant bicycle repairman' for 4 annas (quarter of an Indian rupee). He deeply believed in the dignity of labor. Then in 1896, at the age of 24, he started his own business as a small merchant in Karachi. He soon became very successful and was called Sindh's 'Sugar King' by his contemporaries due to his business trades in sugar.

In 1913, he developed an interest in politics. He first became a member of the Karachi Municipality from May 1913 to September 1916. Again, he was a member of this body from 1 May 1921 to 21 August 1934.

Abdullah Haroon first joined the Indian National Congress party in 1917 and started to participate in the Independence movement of India. He was elected as a member of the Central Legislative Assembly in 1924 and then re-elected twice in 1930 and 1934.

Soon he was disenchanted with the policies of the Congress party of India and joined the All-India Muslim League and remained its strong supporter till his death. In 1919, he became president of the Khilafat Committee of Sindh, a branch of the larger Khilafat Movement of India under the leadership of Muhammad Ali Jouhar.

He also served as president of the Sindh Provincial Muslim League from 1920 to 1930.

In 1930, he attended the All-India Muslim Conference and in the same year, he formed the Sind United Party on the pattern of the Unionist Party (Punjab) which called for the separation of Sindh from the Bombay Presidency, which actually materialised in April 1936 after the enactment of the Government of India Act, 1935. Abdullah Haroon joined the All-India Muslim League in 1937. Although his party won a plurality of seats in the 1937 provincial elections, it was not able to form the government as its leaders like Haroon and Sir Shah Nawaz Bhutto failed to be elected. He was knighted by King George VI in the 1937 Coronation Honours list and came to be known as Sir Abdullah Haroon.

Meanwhile the decline of the Sind United Party led him to organize the Muslim League in Sindh in 1938 and he was elected its president in 1939.

In October 1938, with the help of Shaikh Abdul Majeed Sindhi and Pir Ali Muhammad Rashidi, he organised the First Sind Provincial Muslim League Conference in Karachi, with Muhammad Ali Jinnah presiding. Participation in this conference was from all over India. Haroon headed the Reception Committee and his welcome address, which set the tone for the conference, was considered quite radical at the time. His warning was that, "We have nearly arrived at the parting of the ways and...it will be impossible to save India from being divided into Hindu India and Muslim India, both placed under separate federation". This also prepared the ground for adoption of the Lahore Resolution in March 1940. He also spoke at this historic event and endorsed the resolution.

Abdullah Haroon also was a member of the Muslim League Working Committee that drafted and endorsed the 'Pakistan Resolution' on behalf of all Muslims of Sindh at the 27th Session of the Muslim League at Lahore on 23 March 1940.

== Death and legacy ==
Abdullah Haroon died on 27 April 1942 in Karachi. He had donated ten thousand rupees to the Muslim League at Allahabad in 1942. He was a philanthropist and active in social welfare projects throughout his life and contributed to many charitable institutions. According to Nazaria-i-Pakistan Trust, ..."he had given away a princely sum of Rs 88,961 to charities, which would be equivalent to about Rs 10 million today".

The Pakistan Post issued a commemorative postage stamp in his honour in its 'Pioneers of Freedom' series.

Abdullah Haroon was widely considered to be so honest in his conduct with people that even Mahatma Gandhi had remarked about him, "I will trust this man with a blank cheque".

There is a major street named after him in Saddar, Karachi called Abdullah Haroon Road. Its former name was Victoria Road and an official residence of Prime Minister of Pakistan, 10 Victoria Road, was located there.
