= Junaid Zia =

Pakistani cricketer (born 1983)

Personal information
- Full name: Junaid Zia
- Born: 11 December 1983 (age 42); Lahore, Punjab, Pakistan
- Batting: Right-handed
- Bowling: Right-arm medium-fast
- Role: Bowler
- Relatives: Tauqir Zia (father)

Domestic team information
- Years: Team
- 2000/01–2003/04: Rawalpindi Rams
- 2003/04–2006/07: Pakistan Customs
- 2004/05–2013/14: Lahore Eagles
- 2007/08–2009/10: Lahore Ravi
- 2008/09–2014/15: Lahore Lions
- 2010/11–2013/14: Zarai Taraqiati Bank Limited

Career statistics
| Competition | First-class | List A | Twenty20 |
|---|---|---|---|
| Matches | 90 | 109 | 35 |
| Runs scored | 2,379 | 1,005 | 171 |
| Batting average | 19.99 | 15.22 | 9.00 |
| 100s/50s | 1/8 | 0/4 | 0/0 |
| Top score | 100 | 59* | 35* |
| Balls bowled | 14,992 | 4,843 | 663 |
| Wickets | 282 | 147 | 41 |
| Bowling average | 29.80 | 29.35 | 20.92 |
| 5 wickets in innings | 12 | 1 | 1 |
| 10 wickets in match | 1 | – | – |
| Best bowling | 7/7 | 5/53 | 5/31 |
| Catches/stumpings | 25/– | 29/– | 8/– |
- Source: Cricinfo, 17 April 2026

Junaid Zia (born 11 December 1983) is a Pakistani former cricketer. Zia was a right-handed batsman and right-arm medium-fast bowler, he played four One Day Internationals (ODIs) for the Pakistan national cricket team in 2003 alongside an extensive domestic career. Following his playing retirement, he served as the General Manager of Domestic Cricket Operations for the Pakistan Cricket Board (PCB).

== Early life and family ==
Zia was born on 11 December 1983 in Lahore, Punjab. He is the son of former Pakistan Cricket Board chairman and retired Pakistan Army lieutenant general Tauqir Zia.

== Playing career ==
=== International career ===
Zia represented Pakistan Under-19s at the 2002 Under-19 Cricket World Cup. He made his One Day International debut for Pakistan against Bangladesh at Multan in September 2003. In January 2008, he was recalled to Pakistan's ODI squad for the home series against Zimbabwe after taking 46 wickets in ten Quaid-e-Azam Trophy matches.

=== Domestic career ===
Zia had an extensive domestic career spanning over a decade. He played domestic cricket for several teams including Rawalpindi Rams, Pakistan Customs, Lahore Eagles, Lahore Ravi, Lahore Lions, Habib Bank Limited, Punjab, and Zarai Taraqiati Bank Limited.

One of Zia's most notable bowling performances came in January 2004, when playing for Pakistan Customs against Bangladesh A in the Patrons Trophy, he took 7 wickets for 7 runs in the second innings as Bangladesh A were bowled out for 30 and Pakistan Customs won by an innings and 41 runs. Earlier in his career, he had also taken 6 for 19 in a domestic first-class match against Pakistan Navy.

Playing for Lahore Ravi in the 2007–08 Quaid-e-Azam Trophy, Zia took 6 for 34 against Pakistan Customs in November 2007 to put his side in a commanding position on the opening day. The following month he took 6 for 30 against Sialkot, again for Lahore Ravi, as Sialkot were dismissed cheaply on the first day. In December 2009, he returned 6 for 48 against Islamabad and helped Lahore Ravi complete a ten-wicket victory.

Zia's only first-class century came in November 2010 for Zarai Taraqiati Bank Limited against Islamabad, when he made 100 from 89 balls after coming in at number nine.

In addition to his first-class record, Zia finished with one five-wicket haul in List A cricket, with career-best figures of 5 for 53, and one five-wicket haul in Twenty20 cricket. His Twenty20 five-for came in December 2013, when he took 5 for 31 for Zarai Taraqiati Bank Limited against United Bank Limited in the semi-final of the Faysal Bank T-20 Cup. By the end of his career, he had taken 282 wickets in 90 first-class matches, including 12 five-wicket hauls and one ten-wicket match, alongside 147 wickets in List A cricket and 41 in Twenty20 cricket.

In December 2019, the Pakistan Cricket Board appointed Zia as General Manager – Domestic Cricket Operations.
