= Nasim Ashraf =

Pakistani medical doctor

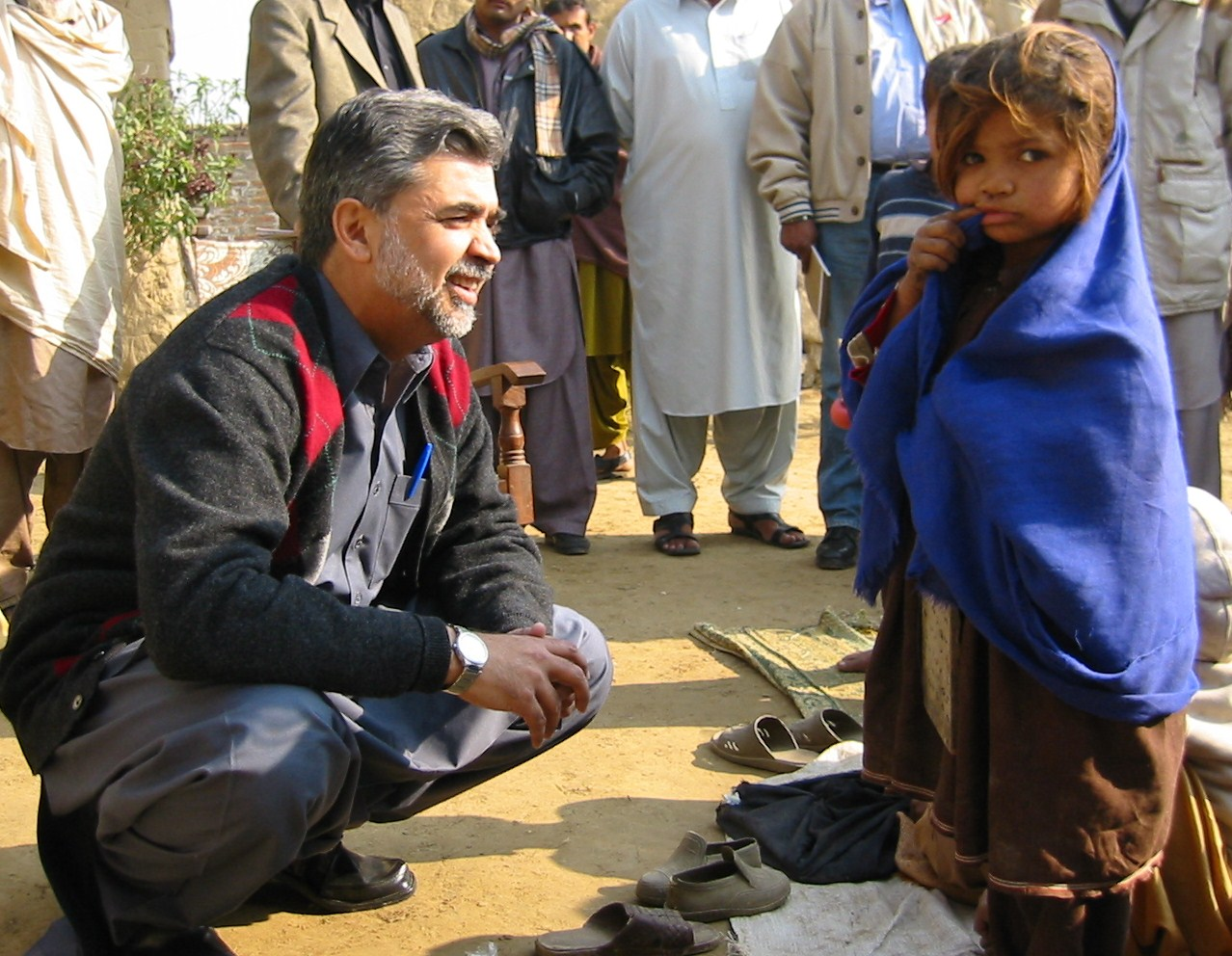
- Ashraf at a Feeder School
- Born: Pakistan
- Citizenship: Pakistani; American
- Occupation: Social worker

Nasim Ashraf (Urdu: نسيم أشرف) is a Pakistani-American social worker, physician, and former cricketer who had been the Chairman of the Pakistan Cricket Board between 2006 and 2008.

He was also the Chairman of the National Commission for Human Development (NCHD), and a Minister of State for six years.

== Early life and education ==
Ashraf was born to a Pashtun family. He completed his medical education from the Khyber Medical College, Peshawar University, in 1972. He is also a fellow of the American College of Physicians.

== Career ==
Ashraf comes from a cricketing family. His maternal grandfather, Karim Baksh, played First-Class cricket in India and was one of the first elected members of the Pakistan Cricket Board in 1949. Ashraf had a very brief first-class cricket career, spanning just 3 matches for the Peshawar Cricket Association in the 1969–70 Quaid-e-Azam Cricket Trophy where as a middle-order batsman. He scored 50 runs.

He also played for Pakistan Under 19 team which played against the English team in the year of 1969. He was appointed as the chairman PCB due to his vast management expertise. He was responsible for bringing about the Constitution of the Pakistan Cricket Board albeit after some serious delays. The task was first entrusted to Shahryar Khan, who resigned and Nasim Ashraf finally succeeded in getting the Constitution restored after having it vetted to make it more corporate in nature. The new Constitution mandates a 14-member governing board with four representatives of the regional associations, one representative of the cricket playing organisations, two representatives of the players, and seven technocrats specialising in finance, law, media, and management. This new Constitution has significantly diluted the powers of the chairman.

He was elected to the Chairmanship of the Asian Cricket Council in June 2008.

=== Submission and rejection of resignation ===
In March 2007, having been in the position for five months after he took over from Shaharyar Khan who stood down in October, Ashraf tendered his own resignation, accepting responsibility for the Pakistan team's first round exit from the 2007 Cricket World Cup in the West Indies at the hands of young Irish Cricket Team. But his resignation was subsequently rejected by President Pervez Musharraf who asked him to "continue his duty to rebuild the Pakistan cricket team on modern and professional lines".

== Awards and honours ==
- Conferred Sitara-i-Imtiaz (Star of Excellence) by the President of Pakistan in 2007.
- UNESCO INTERNATIONAL AWARD for Literacy in 2006.
