= Syed Zulfiqar Bokhari =

Pakistani politician and diplomat (died 2019)

Syed Zulfiqar Ali Bokhari (died 4 January 2019) was a Pakistani politician and diplomat who was the Chairman of the Pakistan Cricket Board (PCB) between 1995 and 1998. He also served an ambassador of Pakistan to Spain.

He was educated at the Aitchison College and was twice elected to the member of the National Assembly of Pakistan.

He was a brother of former Senator Syed Iftikhar Ali Bokhari.
