= Lady Abdullah Haroon =

Political activist of Pakistan (1886-1966)

Lady Abdullah Haroon (1886 – 1966), whose real name was Nusrat Khanum, (Urdu: نصرت خانم) was a socialite before the independence of Pakistan.

== Life ==
Nusrat Khanum was born in a Shia family in Iran, but later settled in Karachi, where in 1914 she married a local businessman and politician Abdullah Haroon and subsequently was known as 'Lady Abdullah Haroon'.

She was very much interested in educating women of Sindh, British India. So she started a school at her home and also founded a female organization known as 'Anjuman-i-Khawateen' to promote the social and economic well-being of women in Sindh. Lady Haroon was able to raise political consciousness among Sindhi women under the banner of the Muslim League. As a result, she was very helpful in gathering support for the party during the Indian provincial elections, 1946.

Earlier in her political career, in 1919, she also had actively participated in politics and was a vigorous supporter of the Khilafat Movement in Sindh.

Lady Haroon was also associated with a number of social organizations. She was elected as the President of 'All India Women Muslim League', a branch of All India Muslim League in 1943. She was the Vice-President of All Pakistan Women's Association founded by Begum Ra'ana Liaquat Ali Khan in 1945.

"Lady Haroon was a prominent woman of Sindh. She was a devoted worker of the Pakistan movement. She was closely associated with the Quaid-i-Azam from whom she always received guidance".

== See also ==
- Abdullah Haroon
- Hameed Haroon
- Abdullah Hussain Haroon
- Mahmoud Haroon
- Yusuf Haroon
