= The Diary of a Social Butterfly =

Book by Moni Mohsin

- Paperback cover
- Author: Moni Mohsin
- Language: English
- Genre: Comedy
- Publisher: Random House India
- Publication date: October 12, 2008
- Publication place: Pakistan
- Media type: Paperback
- Pages: 240
- ISBN: 978-8184000535

The Diary of a Social Butterfly is a 2008 mystery novel by the Pakistani writer Moni Mohsin. The novel was first released as a paperback on October 12, 2005 by Random House India. It is written about a social lady Butterfly, who lives in Karachi. The novel received mostly positive feedback from the reviewers.

In February 2014, Mohsin addressed the Karachi Literature Festival during a session for her book. Digital book was released in 2011.

A quote from her 2014 speech at the Karachi Literature Festival:

"Humour comes from tragedy while anger is what triggers satire. With satire, you speak the truth and hold a mirror up to the society."

Person in the book playing the role, 'Butterfly', is intentionally shown to be a spoiled brat attending high-society parties.
