= Mitchell's =

Pakistani beverages company

Mitchell's Fruit Farms Limited
- Type: Public
- Traded as: PSX: MFFL
- Industry: Food Processing
- Founded: April 25, 1933; 93 years ago
- Founder: Francis J. Mitchell
- Headquarters: Lahore, Pakistan
- Key people: Kashif Sajjad Sheikh (Chairman); Usman Zafar Butt (CEO)
- Revenue: ▲ Rs. 2.66 billion (US$9.5 million) (2025)
- Operating income: ▼ Rs. 180.2 million (US$640,000) (2025)
- Net income: ▼ Rs. 1.7 million (US$6,100) (2025)
- Total assets: ▲ Rs. 1.99 billion (US$7.1 million) (2025)
- Total equity: ▼ Rs. 581 million (US$2.1 million) (2025)
- Number of employees: 290 (2025)
- Parent: CCL Holding
- Website: mitchells.com.pk

Mitchell’s Fruit Farms Limited is a Pakistani food products company headquartered in Lahore, Pakistan. It was founded in 1933 and was acquired by CCL Holding in 2025.

== History ==
Mitchell's, brainchild of Francis J. Mitchell came into existence during the British Indian era near Renala Khurd. The company was formally registered in Lahore in April 1933 under the name Indian Mildura Fruit Farms Limited.

Following the independence of Pakistan in 1947, the company was renamed Mitchell’s Fruit Farms Ltd. In 1958, Francis Mitchell sold a majority of his shares to Syed Maratib.

In 1993, Mitchell's was listed on the Karachi Stock Exchange.

In 2025, Mitchell's was acquired by CCL Holding.

== See also ==
- List of food companies (see food companies list under Pakistan)
