= I.A. Khan =

Pakistani bureaucrat and administrator

Nawabzada Ikram Ahmed Khan, commonly known as I.A. Khan, was a Pakistani bureaucrat and administrator who served from 1969 to 1972 as the chairman of the Board of Control for Cricket in Pakistan (BCCP), as the Pakistan Cricket Board was then known. He also served as the President of Karachi Cricket Association (KCA) for two years and vice President of BCCP.

He died in 2001. His son, Asad I.A. Khan, is a professional golfer.
