= Shoaib Akhtar =

Pakistani cricketer (born 1975)

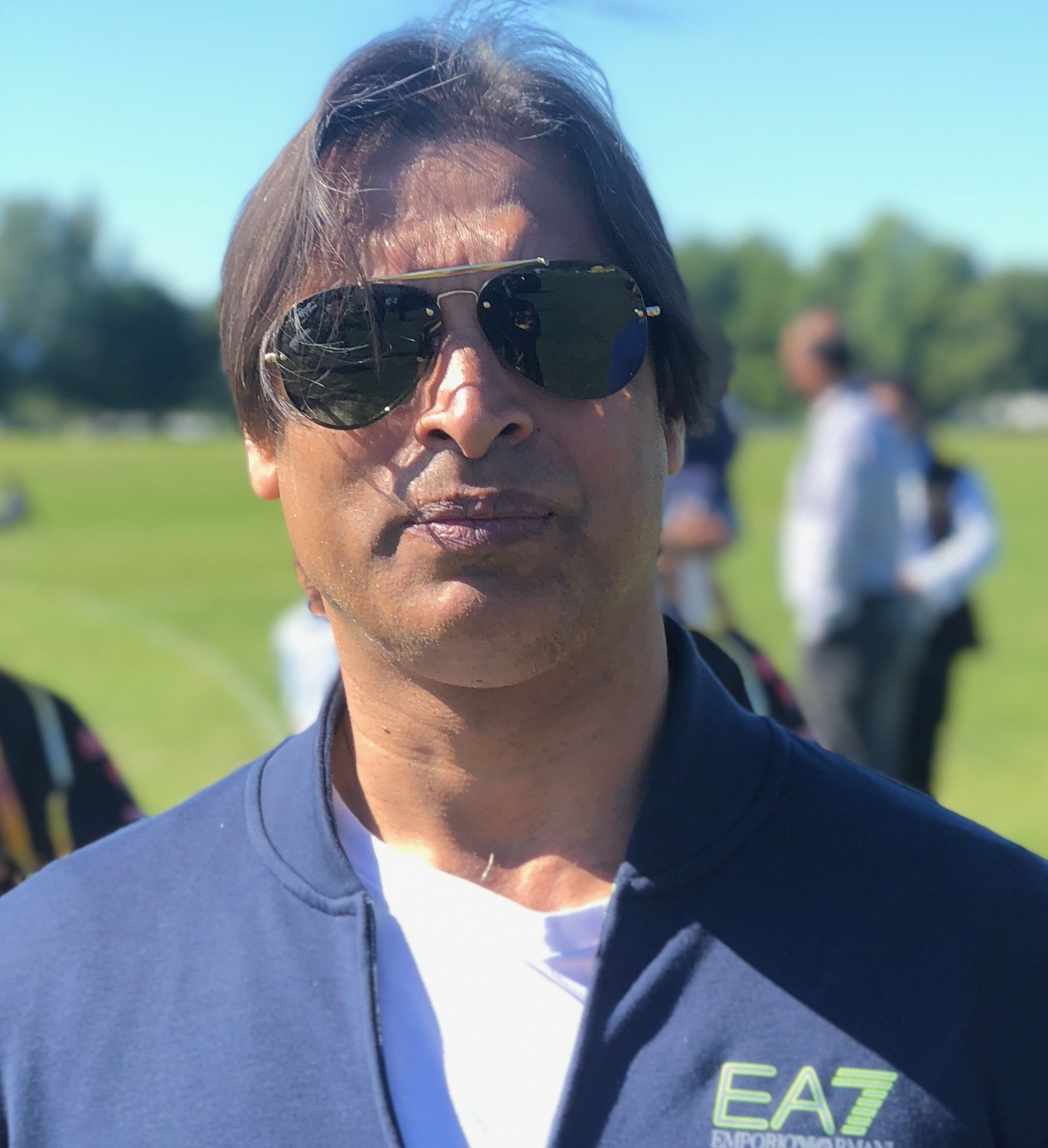
- Shoaib in 2018

Personal information
- Born: 13 August 1975 (age 51); Rawalpindi, Punjab, Pakistan
- Nickname: Rawalpindi Express
- Height: 6 ft 0 in (183 cm)
- Batting: Right-handed
- Bowling: Right-arm fast
- Role: Bowler

International information
- National side: Pakistan (1997–2011)
- Test debut (cap 150): 29 November 1997 v West Indies
- Last Test: 8 December 2007 v India
- ODI debut (cap 123): 28 March 1998 v Zimbabwe
- Last ODI: 8 March 2011 v New Zealand
- ODI shirt no.: 14
- T20I debut (cap 9): 28 August 2006 v England
- Last T20I: 28 December 2010 v New Zealand

Domestic team information
- Years: Team
- 2008: Kolkata Knight Riders
- 2010: Chittagong Division cricket team

Career statistics
Competition	Test	ODI	FC	LA
Matches	46	163	133	221
Runs scored	544	394	1,670	877
Batting average	10.07	8.95	12.27	11.24
100s/50s	0/0	0/0	0/1	0/1
Top score	47	43	59*	56
Balls bowled	8,143	7,764	20,460	10,627
Wickets	178	247	467	338
Bowling average	25.69	24.97	26.26	25.21
5 wickets in innings	12	4	28	7
10 wickets in match	2	0	2	0
Best bowling	6/11	6/16	6/11	6/16
Catches/stumpings	12/–	20/–	41/–	35/–
- Source: ESPNcricinfo, 8 November 2016

Shoaib Akhtar (Note: Punjabi pronunciation: [ˈʃoeːb əxtər]) (born 13 August 1975) is a Pakistani former international cricketer and commentator. Nicknamed the "Rawalpindi Express", he is the fastest bowler in cricketing history.

Akhtar made his Test match debut in November 1997 as an opening fast bowler and played his first One Day International three months later. Post-retirement, he began a YouTube career by starting his own channel, where he gives reviews on International and league matches and Pakistani cricket.

== Early and personal life ==
Akhtar was born into a Punjabi family, with his paternal side belonging to the Gujjar community, and his maternal side to the Awan community, in the small town of Morgah in Rawalpindi, Punjab.

His father, Mohammad Akhtar, whom Shoaib describes as very religious and "from a hardworking, economically unprivileged family of the Gujjar community", worked as a night watchman at a petrol station belonging to the Attock oil refinery, and married his mother, Hameeda Awan, when she was a teenager, and they had five children: four sons, Shoaib being the fourth, followed by a daughter, while his name, which in Arabic means both "the one who brings people together" and "the one who separates", was chosen by his mother.

He married Rubab Khan on 11 November 2014. In November 2016, they welcomed their first child, a son named Mohammad Mikaeel Ali, and in July 2019 they became parents a second time to another baby boy, Mujaddid. In March 2024, they welcomed a baby girl, Nooreh Ali.

== Early career ==
A good student, Akhtar was admitted to the Asghar Mall College, but he disrupted his studies to attend trials for the PIA team's Karachi division to be held in Lahore. Lacking the money for a bus ticket, he waited for the bus to start and got onto the roof.

After some struggle, starting his List A career during the 1993/1994 season and his first-class career in 1994/1995, he caught the eye of Majid Khan, then the chief executive of the PCB, and after a good performance for the Pakistan A team's tour of England, in 1996, he was rewarded with his maiden Test cap against the West Indies in 1997.

== International career ==
Shoaib Akhtar bowling in 2006

Considering his subsequent high profile in cricket, Akhtar's Test career started rather modestly. He was first picked to play on his home ground in Rawalpindi during the 2nd Test of the West Indies 1997/98 tour of Pakistan. He was subsequently included in the tour of South Africa during the winter of 1998, where he played in all three Tests. He was notably the spearhead of a depleted Pakistani bowling attack in the Peshawar Test against the visiting Australians later in 1998, where Mark Taylor scored his famous unbeaten 334 in Australia's first innings. Subsequently, after 8 Tests and 16 innings, Akhtar had accumulated only 18 wickets.

Akhtar's run of impressive performances started in 1999, during a pre-World Cup series against India. It was followed by outstanding bowling performances in Sharjah and later in the 1999 Cricket World Cup. Writing in the context of the 1999 World Cup, former West Indies fast bowler Colin Croft, who compared his bowling style to that of Waqar Younis "in approach and delivery", also wrote that "Shoaib could very well be the first bowler to pass the official 100 miles per hour mark." His most significant performance was in India in 1999 when he captured eight wickets in the Asian Test championship match at Calcutta – including the wickets of Indian batsmen Rahul Dravid and Sachin Tendulkar when he bowled both batsmen off successive deliveries. It was the first ball he ever bowled to Tendulkar. He was also involved in Tendulkar's wicket in the 2nd innings of that same Test, when he was perceived as obstructing him from reaching the crease before he was run out by a long throw from substitute fielder Nadeem Khan, leading to rioting in the stands.

In 2002, he was selected for the Pakistan team against Australia and achieved a small amount of success. However, the team performed poorly during the 2003 Cricket World Cup and after the tournament he was dropped from the Pakistan squad. He was selected back into the Pakistan squad as they had no choice in the 2003 Test match series against New Zealand but struggled in a losing Test series against India in 2004. The series ended with a controversy when he left the field citing an injury leading to suspicions by former Pakistan captain, Inzamam-ul-Haq, about his commitment to the team. As a result, his relationship with Inzamam-ul-Haq and former Pakistan coach Bob Woolmer deteriorated. A medical panel was set up by the Pakistan Cricket Board to investigate the nature of his injury, however Pakistan officials dispelled all suspicions.

In 2005, Akhtar regained his reputation as a fast bowler for his team. Playing in a three-Test home series against England, he made a series of impressive bowling performances. His effective use of slower deliveries proved to be unplayable by the English batsmen. Akhtar emerged as the highest wicket taker of the series with seventeen wickets. His comeback was also remarkable as prior to his return, he had been criticized from all corners, such as by the Worcestershire chairman John Elliot for his celebrity attitude and lack of commitment to the team. His performance was also acknowledged by the English captain Michael Vaughan, who remarked "I thought he (Shoaib) was a big difference between the two teams".

Throughout his career, he was regarded as one of the fastest bowlers in the history of international cricket. He achieved the record of the fastest recorded bowl to date at 161.3 km/h since 1998 when the bowling speed guns were introduced to international cricket with the new speed measuring method. He is also known as one of only three bowlers to have ever broken the 100 mph barrier in cricket history, with a delivery of 100.2 mph, during a one-day international against England at the 2003 World Cup.

=== Struggle for form and consistent injuries (2007–2009) ===
On 29 October 2007, Akhtar made his return to cricket after his 13-match ban and performed very well, taking 4 wickets for 43 runs against South Africa in the fifth and deciding match of the One Day International series in Lahore in Pakistan. Subsequently, he was included in the 16-man Pakistan squad for the 2007 tour of India.

=== Rehabilitation and final years (2010–2011) ===
Akhtar made a return to international cricket albeit in the shorter format of the game. In May 2010, PCB named him in a list of 35 probable's for the Asia Cup. On 15 June 2010, Akhtar made his return, taking 3 wickets for 28 runs in the first match of the Asia Cup against Sri Lanka. He narrowly missed out a spot in the 2010 ICC World Twenty20 in place of the injured Umar Gul.

In July 2010, he was selected for the Twenty20 series against Australia but the selectors decided not to play him in the Test squad so that he would not get injured. He was subsequently selected for the ODI and Twenty20 series against England in September 2010.

Akhtar returned to the national team representing the country against England in the Twenty20 International. He bowled an impressive spell and returned with figures of 2 wickets for 23 runs. He continued to bowl well in the ODI series in the absence of regular fast-bowlers, Mohammad Asif and Mohammad Amir, who were suspended by the International Cricket Council amid allegations of Spot-fixing. Despite his relatively good bowling form, Pakistani coach Waqar Younis insisted that the bowling attack must not become reliant on Akhtar, as he was 35 years of age and fitness troubles continued to affect him. Akhtar was selected for the tour of New Zealand and started his campaign off well with 3 wickets on Boxing Day in the first of two Twenty20 Internationals against New Zealand.

Akhtar was selected in Pakistan's 15-man squad to play in the 2011 World Cup hosted by Bangladesh, India, and Sri Lanka in February to March. During the tournament, he announced that he would retire from international cricket at the end of the World Cup. He was dropped from the squad after group matches and was not included in the quarter final either.

== Domestic career ==
=== England county cricket ===
Akhtar has played for three English county cricket clubs: Somerset in 2001, Durham in 2003 and 2004 and Worcestershire in 2005. He did achieve his moments of success, such as taking 5 wickets for 35 runs for Durham against Somerset in the National League in 2003 and claiming 6 wickets for 16 runs in the same competition for Worcestershire against Gloucestershire two years later, but he suffered from fitness problems, as well as a perception that he was less than interested in his task. This was particularly the case at Worcestershire: chairman John Elliott said "Players like that are no good to our club. In fact, Akhtar has been no good for any club he's been at."

=== Indian Premier League ===
Akhtar made a successful return to cricket in 2008 in his first game in the Indian Premier League, playing for the Kolkata Knight Riders against the Delhi Daredevils. Defending a low score of 133 runs, Akhtar took four top order wickets which ultimately led to the Daredevils being restricted to 110 runs. He ended with figures of 4 wickets for 11 runs from three overs, a performance which earned him the player of the match award. Akhtar denied that he had any point to prove with his performance, stating, "I just wanted to win the game." Knight Riders' captain Sourav Ganguly also acknowledged Akhtar's performance, "He came to the country with lots [of things] happening behind him...But he showed a lot of character."

== Cricket controversies and injuries ==
Akhtar's career was plagued with injuries, controversies and accusations of poor attitude. After Pakistan's poor performance in the 2003 Cricket World Cup, he got involved in a verbal conflict with former Pakistan captain and fast bowler Waqar Younis. Later on Akhtar was sacked along with other players, including Younis. In a triangular series in 2003 held in Sri Lanka, he was caught ball tampering making him the second player in cricket to be banned on ball tampering charges. The same year he was banned for one Test match and two One Day International matches for abusing South African spin bowler Paul Adams, during a match against South Africa. In the 2004 home series with India, he struggled with wrist and back injuries, which raised questions about his commitment to the team.

He was sent back from the 2005 Australia tour with a hamstring injury amid rumours of indiscipline, lack of commitment and attitudinal complaints. He was subsequently fined by the Pakistan Cricket Board for avoiding a late-night curfew. The rest of his cricketing career was riddled with ankle and knee injuries which forced him to undergo a surgery in February 2006, until finally he was banned for two years for allegedly using performance-enhancing drugs.

=== Drug scandal ===
On 16 October 2006, Akhtar was suspended by the Pakistan Cricket Board, along with Mohammed Asif after they tested positive for a performance-enhancing substance nandrolone. They were consequently pulled out from the 2006 ICC Champions Trophy. Former Pakistan Cricket Board chairman later stated that he had always suspected Akhtar of substance abuse due to his consistent "reservations" to drug tests. Former Pakistan captain Inzamam ul-Haq had also previously complained about Akhtar's drug abuse but was not reported to the Pakistan Cricket Board. Akhtar immediately declared his innocence and he declined knowingly taking any performance-enhancing drugs. In a statement issued to the press, he claimed that he could never cheat teammates or opponents. During a hearing with the Pakistan Cricket Board Anti-Doping Committee, he along with Asif maintained taking non-steroidal dietary supplements. He, however, failed to convince the committee of his innocence. In its report submitted to the Pakistan Cricket Board, the Anti-Doping Committee recommended a two-year ban.

On 1 November 2006, the Pakistan Cricket Board handed down a two-year suspension to Akhtar and a one-year suspension to Asif, banning them from professional cricket during the period. Shoaib had subsequently been added to Pakistan Olympic Association list of doping offenders. However, on 5 December 2006 represented by his lawyer Abid Hassan Minto, Akhtar was cleared on appeal.

On 5 December 2006, Akhtar and Asif were acquitted by the tribunal appointed to review their appeals. After a clear hearing from Akhtar's lawyer Abid Hassan Minto, the three-man committee, voted two to one in favour of the acquittal. Justice Fakhruddin Ebrahim, committee head, and Haseeb Ahsan, former Test cricketer, were in favour of the acquittal. The third member, Danish Zaheer, differed. "Exceptional circumstances" were cited including discrepancies between the instantaneous offence charges of doping that were laid and the quick delivery of a very harsh verdict. The complete drug testing procedure was concluded to have been technically flawed as it did not follow standard procedures. Other established facts by the committee included that the duo were not aware of the banned drug to be present in their supplements because the Pakistan Cricket Board itself had not informed them of the dangers of contaminated supplements.

Akhtar and Asif, however, did not play in the subsequent Test match series against the West Indies because the Pakistan Cricket Board had recommended that they play domestic games first to recover form and fitness. On 1 March 2007 Akhtar and Asif were ruled out of the Pakistani squad for the 2007 Cricket World Cup by team officials, minutes before the squad was to depart for the West Indies. The team management along with the Pakistan Cricket Board said their injuries were too severe to risk taking them to the Caribbean. Since neither of the two had been declared fit they did not undergo official doping tests.

World Anti-Doping Agency ( WADA) challenged Pakistan's decision to lift bans on fast bowlers Akhtar and Asif by taking the case to the Court of Arbitration for Sport in Lausanne, Switzerland. The ICC supported the WADA appeal adding that it was committed to a dope free game. On 2 July 2007, the Court of Arbitration for Sport dropped the case, ruling it had no jurisdiction to challenge the decision made by PCB.

=== Other controversies ===
In August 2007, Akhtar was reported to have used foul language against Pakistan Cricket Board protesting the imposing of fine of Rs. 300,000 for indiscipline during the national camp in Karachi. In the week before the inaugural World Twenty20, held in South Africa, Akhtar was rumored to have hit Pakistani teammate Mohammad Asif with a bat after an argument in the dressing room. It started after Akhtar was ridiculed by Asif and Shahid Afridi for comparing himself with Imran Khan. After the initial inquiry, Akhtar was found to be at fault and was subsequently recalled from the Twenty20 World Cup squad and was sent home. He was also banned for 5 matches by the Pakistan Cricket Board. Akhtar later claimed that Afridi was responsible for the fight, saying "He made some ill remarks about my family. And I could not tolerate them." Afridi however, denied these allegations adding that Asif would have suffered more injuries but for his intervention. Even Asif chipped in saying that Akhtar was lying and that "Shahid Afridi had nothing to do with the fight", saying that "he has not apologized to me."

On 1 April 2008, Akhtar was banned for five years for violating the players' code of conduct. The ban extended to all cricket for and in Pakistan. Despite the ban not preventing him from playing in the Indian Premier League, the IPL governing council decided not to allow Akhtar to play in the tournament until the end of the ban or unless it is lifted. IS Bindra, a member of the council, was quoted as saying, "Even though they [the PCB] have cleared him to play for IPL, we felt that international discipline needs to be respected." Meanwhile, Akhtar vowed to go to great lengths to fight the ban, "I will appeal, as is my right. If that fails I will go to court, if that fails then I will go to the Supreme Court." On 3 April, Pakistan Cricket Board chairman Nasim Ashraf served a legal notice on Akhtar, calling on him to retract statements he made to a news channel, alleging the ban was punishment in return for refusing to give the chairman a share of his earnings from the Indian Premier League, Ashraf also sought damages of Rs 100 million (approximately US$1.6 million) for "defaming him personally" and an additional Rs 100 million to the Pakistan Cricket Board for "sullying the name of the Pakistan Cricket Board and the Pakistan Cricket team." A three-man appellate tribunal announced on 30 April that they had temporarily upheld Akhtar's five-year ban, deciding to revisit the appeal hearing in June. Despite Akhtar's later retracting his claims and also issuing an unconditional apology for "any grief or embarrassment that may have been caused to the nation, particularly to the Pakistan Cricket Board chairman Dr Nasim Ashraf", Ashraf's legal counsel filed a Rs 220 million (approx. US$3.37 million) defamation suit against Akhtar in a civil court in Lahore on 2 May. On 4 May, the Pakistan Cricket Board's appellate tribunal suspended the five-year ban for one month, until they reconvene on 4 June, allowing Akhtar to take part in the ongoing Indian Premier League. A day later, the Pakistan Cricket Board announced that they will no longer pursue the defamation suit following a reconciliation between Akhtar and chairman Nasim Ashraf at the house of Rehman Malik, a key political official, in Islamabad. "My honour has been vindicated and now the defamation lawsuit will not be pursued," Ashraf was quoted as saying.

On 4 September 2008, Akhtar was sent back home from Heathrow airport by British immigration officials on visa grounds; Akhtar only had a visit visa but not a working visa, which is required to play in county cricket. He subsequently obtained the necessary visa and returned to play with English county club Surrey.

On 21 May 2009, Akhtar was dropped from 2009 ICC World Twenty20 Pakistan squad because of genital viral warts.

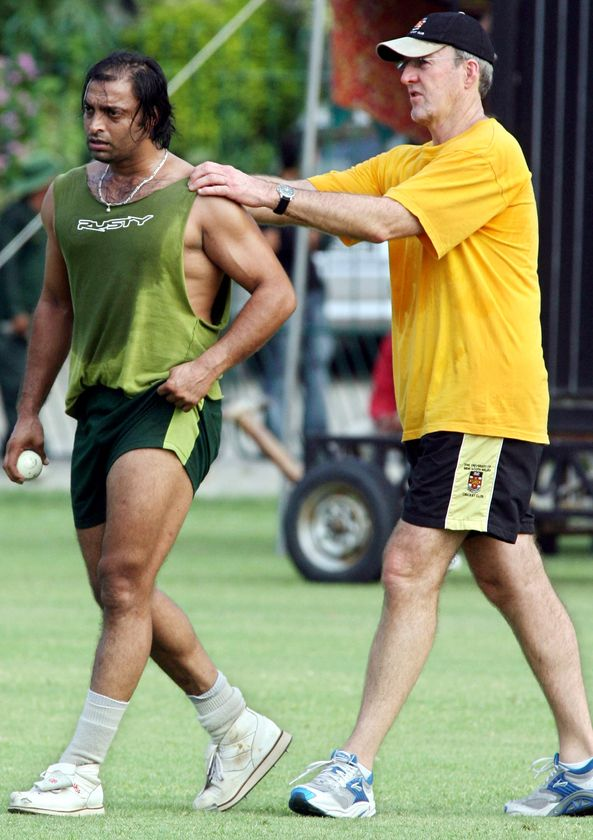
Akhtar during a training session with Geoff Lawson in 2008. Lawson criticized Akhtar's attitude during his time as Pakistan's head coach

During an interview in June 2009 former Pakistan cricket team head coach Geoff Lawson remarked that Shoaib was totally unprofessional as a cricketer, despite his rare natural talent a player with his attitude wouldn't even be picked by a club team in Australia.

In July 2012, Akhtar accused the PCB stating that there was too much "politics" in the Board and some of its officials did not want Pakistani team to win.

In February 2023, he was criticized for saying that Babar Azam was not a "brand" because he "lacks character" and was unable to speak good English, extending this criticism to other players as well.

== Post-retirement ==
=== Book ===
In September 2011, few months after his retirement from international cricket, he released his autobiography Controversially Yours, co-written with Indian social anthropologist and journalist Anshu Dogra.

It was met with positive reviews, observers noting the interest of having Shoaib's comments, nearly always critical, on issues pertaining to the administration of cricket in Pakistan, the controversies surrounding ball tampering and his views on cricketers, from Pakistan as well outside.

=== Hosting ===
In May 2017, at the beginning of Ramadan, he co-hosted the game show Geo Khelo Pakistan with Wasim Akram. The show ended in October 2017.

In February 2023, he launched his own The Shoaib Akhtar Show on the OTT platform UrduFlix.

=== YouTube ===
He owns a YouTube channel, in which he shares his opinions, interacts with his fans and talk with some of the current and past sports celebrities. The channel has been met with a positive response from the audience and as of August 2023 it has gained around 3.73 million subscribers.

== Television ==
=== Reality shows ===
Year	Title	Channel	Role	Language
2007	Jjhoom India	Sahara One	Guest	Hindi
2015	Comedy Nights with Kapil	Colors TV	Guest	Hindi
2016	Mazaak Mazaak Mein	Life OK	Judge	Hindi
2017	Geo Khelo Pakistan	Geo TV	Host	Urdu
2018	The After Moon Show	Hum TV	Guest	Urdu
2018	Tonite with HSY	Hum Sitaray	Guest	Urdu
2019	YouTube Rewind 2019	YouTube	Self	English
2023	The Shoaib Akhtar Show	UrduFlix	Host	Urdu

=== Series ===
Year	Title	Channel	Role	Language
2024	22 Qadam	Green Entertainment	Self	Urdu

=== Documentaries ===
Year	Title	Channel	Role	Language
2025	The Greatest Rivalry: India vs Pakistan	Netflix	Self	English
