= Khalid Mahmood (civil servant) =

Pakistani bureaucrat and civil servant (born 1949)

Pakistan Cricket Board

Personal details
- Born: Khalid Mahmood
- Parent: Chaudhry Manzoor Hussain (father)
- Profession: Administrator; Civil Servant

Khalid Mahmood is a Pakistani civil servant who served as the chairman of the Pakistan Cricket Board (PCB) in 1998 and 1999. Educated at Government Central Model School and Government College Lahore, Mr. Khalid Mahmood holds a Master's degrees in History (Gold Medalist) and Political Science. He obtained a law degree from the Punjab University Lahore and later did his L.L.M. from Harvard Law School, U.S.A.

After qualifying the CSS exam in 1967, Mr. Khalid Mahmood was placed in the Tax Group and retired as a Secretary to the Government of Pakistan in 2005. He held a number of important positions in the Federal Board of Revenue (FBR), Member Income Tax Appellate Tribunal, Member Finance, Water and Power Development Authority (WAPDA), Director, Kot Adu Power Company (KAPCO), Director Finance, Oil and Gas Development Company Limited (OGDCL), Director General, Civil Services Academy, and Principal, Pakistan Administrative Staff College (re-named NSPP), Lahore. His last appointment while in Government service was Chairman, Technical Education and Vocational Training Authority (TEVTA) Punjab. On the basis of his extensive and varied experience, he was sworn in as the 5th Ombudsman for the Province of Punjab on December 8th, 2008 and served in that capacity for the next four years.

His keen interest in sports particularly cricket, provided Mr. Khalid Mahmood opportunities to serve Pakistan Cricket Board (PCB) in various capacities: Honorary Secretary (1975-1976), Member PCB Council (1988 94), Manager of Pakistan Cricket Team touring England, India, South Africa and the West Indies (1992-1993) and as Chairman PCB (1998-1999). Mr. Khalid Mahmood is also a writer and a columnist. His report on "Corporatization and Restructuring of WAPDA depicts the valuable experience gained by him while serving in WAPDA. Similarly, after visiting England as Manager of Pakistan Cricket Team, his publication "Eye of the Storm" was well received by the general public particularly cricket lovers in Pakistan. He contributed regular columns for daily Nawa-i-Waqt Lahore and later in Daily Dunya.

Currently, he is Chairman Maulana Zafar Ali Khan Foundation, a non-political, socio-cultural, educational and literary society founded by the Govt. of the Punjab in 2004 to make our younger generations aware of the legacy and works of Maulana Zafar Ali Khan related to freedom movement, journalism, education, poetry and politics.
