= Pakistan Cricket Board =

Governing body for cricket in Pakistan

Pakistan Cricket Board (PCB)
- پاکستان کرکٹ بورڈ
- Sport: Cricket
- Jurisdiction: Pakistan
- Abbreviation: PCB
- Founded: May 1, 1949; 77 years ago
- Affiliation: International Cricket Council
- Affiliation date: July 28, 1952; 74 years ago
- Regional affiliation: Asian Cricket Council
- Affiliation date: September 19, 1983; 43 years ago
- Headquarters: Gaddafi Stadium
- Location: Lahore, Punjab, Pakistan
- Chairman: Mohsin Naqvi
- Men's coach: Mike Hesson; Azhar Mehmood
- Women's coach: Vacant
- Operating income: Rs. 19.32 billion (US$69 million) (2020-21)
- Sponsor: Pepsi; Park View City; TCL
- Replaced: Board of Control for Cricket in Pakistan

Official website
- pcb.com.pk
- (Pakistan)

The Pakistan Cricket Board (PCB), formerly known as Board of Control for Cricket in Pakistan (BCCP), is the sports governing body for cricket in Pakistan responsible for controlling and organising all tours and matches undertaken by the Pakistan national cricket team. A full member of the International Cricket Council (ICC) since 1952, it represents the country's men's and women's national teams in international cricket tournaments played under the ICC.

== History ==
Following the establishment of Pakistan in 1947, professional and amateur cricket commenced in the same year. Cricket matches were arranged informally until 1948, when a Board of Control was formally instituted. Pakistan was admitted to the Imperial Cricket Conference (currently known as International Cricket Council) in July 1952, and has since been a full member, playing Test cricket. The team's first Test series took place in India between October and December 1952.

== Inaugural Board of Control ==
The Pakistan Cricket Board was inaugurated on 1 May 1949 as the Board of Control for Cricket in Pakistan (BCCP). The first meeting, held in the committee rooms of Lahore Gymkhana, saw HE Iftikhar Hussain Khan Mamdot, the Nawab of Mamdot, made president and chairman, with Justice A. R. Cornelius as one of three vice-presidents. The following year, Cornelius became chairman of the working committee, until he relinquished his connection with the board in early 1953.

The working chairman was always one of the three vice-presidents. In November 1958, President Ayub Khan appointed three more new vice-presidents. Then between December 1958 and September 1969 the post of vice-president disappeared.

== Committees ==
The response to turmoil within the board has on four occasions been to suspend the rules and appoint an ad hoc committee. The first ad hoc committee was appointed in September 1960 and did not disband until May 1963 having created a new constitution. The President of Pakistan would now nominate the board president who would in turn nominate the other members of the executive committee to sit for a period of three years. Representatives of the four provincial cricket associations and Government departments formed the executive committee.

The BCCP was re-organised in the 1970s and was headed by former cricketers, professional administrators and trustees, who were often businessmen. In November 1976 players' demands for increased salaries reached a crisis and the Pakistan Sports Board took over running the BCCP's affairs. Long-serving president, the formidable Kardar, was in the thick of the dispute. The revolt against Kardar forced him to resign in May 1977 and led to a new Ad Hoc Committee replacing the Board Council in 1978 running Pakistan cricket and again changing the constitution. Provincial Cricket Associations were eliminated and divisional and city CAs became members, giving most of the influence to the city Cricket Association of Lahore and Karachi.

The Board now governed a network of teams sponsored by corporations and banks, city associations and clubs. There was no province-based official team type organisation of domestic cricket in Pakistan and Lahore and Karachi cities were the two top tiers of all cricket, including reservoirs of fresh talent.

Pakistan cricket was beset by dissension and controversy over the national team's poor performance during the tour of India and a public uproar forced the end of the Ad Hoc Committee. The chairman and team captain Asif Iqbal had to step down. Air Marshal Nur Khan now became chairman and he saw to it that the banks and other organisations increased their participation on the Board Council in the face of protests from the zonal organisations.

A third ad hoc committee under Javed Burki took charge of BCCP affairs in January 1994 and made a new constitution including giving it a new name, the Pakistan Cricket Board (P.C.B.). It introduced a chairman and chief executive.

After heavy accusations of corruption and match fixing, the Board was taken over by a fourth Ad Hoc Committee formed on 17 July 1999 which remained in place despite undertakings from Musharraf to bring it to an end. The Pakistan Cricket Board re-emerged by taking the initiative to sponsor the hugely successful 2004 tour of Pakistan by their rivals India. The Pakistan Cricket Board's association with, and participation in the Twenty20 cricket form also proved popular and it hoped to similarly revive popular interest in domestic games. However, Pakistan's early exit from the 2007 World Cup cast a shadow and later Dr. Nasim Ashraf resigned at the end of 2008.

Ejaz Butt was named the PCB Chairman in October 2008, and Zaka Ashraf took over from Butt in October 2011.

On 28 May 2013, Zaka Ashraf was suspended as PCB Chairman by Islamabad High Court due to a dubious election. The newly sworn in Government of Nawaz Sharif named Najam Sethi as acting PCB Chairman. On 15 October 2013, the governing council of the Pakistan Cricket Board was dissolved by the Prime Minister of Pakistan, Nawaz Sharif, and an interim five man management committee was named consisting of acting chairman Najam Sethi‚ Shahryar Khan, two former players (Zaheer Abbas and Haroon Rasheed), and former team manager Naveed Cheema.

On 15 January 2014, Zaka Ashraf was reinstated as PCB Chairman. The PML-N Government was unhappy with the reinstatement (since Ashraf was a PPP appointee), and this led to Ashraf's sacking. In February, the PCB Governing Board was dissolved and an eight-member management committee (comprising Shakil Sheikh, Shaharyar Khan, Zaheer Abbas, Iqbal Qasim, Naveed Akram Cheema, Yusaf Naseem Khokar and Faridullah Khan, the secretary of the IPC). Najam Sethi was elected as chairman by the management committee.

== Domestic cricket ==
The structure of domestic cricket in Pakistan at the highest level has changed many times since 1947 with the latest restructure being created in 2019. Previously domestic cricket operated with departmental, city and regional teams - a set up encouraged by Abdul Hafeez Kardar. Since 1947, the domestic first class cricket system has varied considerably each year with teams ranging from 7 to 26 and tournament matches operating under different formats (often changes occurred every year). With the advent of domestic List A and T20 forms of cricket in the 1970s and 2000s, there has been no consistent set up (as has been noted for first class cricket in Pakistan). Historically, school and club cricket has also suffered due to inconsistencies in top tier domestic cricket. The consistent changes in the domestic structure and the gradual introduction of departmental teams was encouraged as it provided permanent jobs to players. Matches were rarely televised due to lack of quality cricket and lack of interest in departmental cricket. This inconsistent system was widely criticised on the basis of low quality cricket and reduced competition.

In 2019, six regional teams were created on provincial lines. The teams would compete in the principal competitions in all three formats of the game. The competitions are:

- Quaid-e-Azam Trophy (First Class)
- Pakistan Cup (List A)
- National T20 Cup (Domestic T20)

The PCB's rationale in reducing the number of teams in domestic cricket was to concentrate talent in order to increase competition and improve the quality of cricket. The new structure also consisted of corresponding second XI, under-19, under-16 and under-13 competitions, and live television coverage of top level matches. The restructuring also reorganised district level cricket into a three tier bottom-up system, with 90 city cricket associations supervising school and club cricket at grassroots level, and inter-city tournaments providing a stepping-stone to the six elite regional teams.

The six regional teams (operated by respective six cricket associations) ensure that the affairs of the associations at city level are regulated. They frame policies that will develop cricket at the grassroots, manage club cricket in collaboration with the 90 city associations and also oversee intra-city competitions. The teams are responsible for revenue generation through sponsorship, marketing and strategic collaborations with business conglomerates. Each of the six regional teams have a chief executive officer and a management committee that has been tasked with supervising all cricketing activities. These changes have been made by the PCB in order to decentralise the administrative body so that it can limit itself to a supervisory role by delegating responsibilities related to the development of the sport to the provincial associations. This tiered structure has been enshrined in the PCB constitution.

== Presidents and chairmen ==
No.	Name	Took office	Left office	Notes
1	Nawab Iftikhar Hussain Khan	May 1949	March 1950	
2	Chaudhry Nazir Ahmad Khan	March 1950	September 1951	
3	Abdus Sattar Pirzada	September 1951	May 1953	
4	Mian Aminuddin	March 1953	July 1954	
5	Muhammad Ali Bogra	July 1954	September 1955	
6	Maj. Gen Iskander Mirza	September 1955	December 1958	
7	President Muhammad Ayub Khan	Dec 1958	June 1960	
8	Justice A.R.Cornelius	June 1960	May 1963	
9	Syed Fida Hassan	June 1963	May 1969	
10	Ikram Ahmed Khan (President)	May 1969	May 1972	
11	Abdul Hafeez Kardar	May 1972	April 1977	
12	Chaudhry Muhammad Hussain	April 1977	July 1978	
13	Lt Gen. (Retd) Khwaja Muhammad Azhar	August 1978	February 1980	
14	Air Marshal (Retd) Malik Nur Khan	February 1980	February 1984	
15	Lt Gen. (Retd) Ghulam Safdar Butt	February 1984	February 1988	
16	Lt Gen. (Retd) Zahid Ali Akbar Khan	February 1988	September 1992	
17	Justice Dr. Nasim Hasan Shah	October 1992	December 1994	
18	Javed Burki	January 1994	March 1995	
19	Syed Zulfiqar Bokhari	March 1995	January 1998	
20	Khalid Mahmood	January 1998	July 1999	
21	Mujeeb ur Rehman	September 1999	October 1999	
22	Dr. Zafar Altaf	October 1999	December 1999	
23	Lt. Gen. Tauqir Zia	December 1999	December 2003	
24	Shaharyar Khan	December 2003	October 2006	
25	Nasim Ashraf	October 2006	August 2008	
26	Ijaz Butt	August 2008	October 2011	
27	Zaka Ashraf	October 2011	May 2013	(suspended by IHC)
28	Najam Sethi	June 2013	January 2014	
29	Zaka Ashraf	January 2014	February 2014	(Reinstated by IHC)
30	Najam Sethi	February 2014	16 May 2014	
31	Shaharyar Khan	May 2014	August 2017	
32	Najam Sethi	August 2017	August 2018	
33	Ehsan Mani	August 2018	August 2021	
34	Ramiz Raja	September 2021	December 2022	
35	Najam Sethi	December 2022	June 2023	Chairman Management Committee
36	Zaka Ashraf	July 2023	January 2024	Chairman Management Committee
37	Mohsin Raza Naqvi	February 2024	Incumbent	

=== Secretary ===
No.	Name	Took office	Left office
1	Bashir Ahmad	1965	1971
2	Dr Zafar Altaf	1972	1975
3	Khalid Mahmood	1975	1976
4	Lt Col Zafar Ahmad	1977	1978
5	Lt Col (Retd) Rafi Nasim	1978	1980
6	Zulfiqar Ahmad	1986	1986
7	Muhammad Ijaz Butt	1986	1988
8	Arif Ali Khan Abbasi	1988	1991
9	Shahid Rafi	1991	1994
10	Ghulam Mustafa Khan	1995	1997
11	Waqar Ahmad	1997	1999
12	Shafqat Rana	1999	2000
Position Abolished

=== Chief executive officers ===
No.	Name	Took office	Left office
1	Arif Ali Khan Abbasi	1995	1996
2	Majid Khan	1996	1997
3	Yawar Saeed	1998	2000
4	Brig Munawar Ahmad Rana	2000	2002
5	Chishti Mujahid	2002	2003
6	Ramiz Hasan Raja	2003	2004
7	Abbas Zaidi	2004	2006
8	Shafqat Hussain Naghmi	2006	2008
9	Salim Altaf	2008	2009
10	Wasim Bari	2009	2010
11	Subhan Ahmed	2010	2018
12	Wasim Khan	2018	2021
13	Faisal Husnain	2022	2023
Position Abolished

== Headquarters ==
The PCB headquarters are located near the Gaddafi Stadium, Lahore, Pakistan. All PCB Officials sit there during the weekdays from 9AM to 5PM.

== PCB annual awards ==
Pakistan Cricket Board for the first time held inaugural awards in 2012 to recognize, acknowledge and honour Pakistan's prime cricketing talent that has consistently stood out on the field of play.

Category
PCB Curator of the year
PCB Umpire of the year
PCB Deaf Cricketer of the year
PCB Blind Cricketer of the year
PCB Woman Cricketer of the Year
PCB Most Valuable Domestic Bowler
PCB Most Valuable Domestic Batsman
PCB Emerging Player of the Year
PCB T20I Bowler of the Year
PCB T20I Batter of the Year
PCB ODI Bowler of the Year
PCB ODI Batter of the Year
PCB Test Bowler of the Year
PCB Test Batter of the Year
PCB Player of the Year
PCB Life Time Achievement Award
Special Prize for Best Bowler of the Year

== PCB initiative to revive cricket in Pakistan ==
Following years of limited international exposure after the 2009 attack on the Sri Lanka national cricket team, the Pakistan Cricket Board launched sustained efforts to restore full-scale international cricket in Pakistan.

=== Confidence building visits ===
The Australian Higher Commissioner to Pakistan, Peter Heyward, visited the PCB headquarters at Gaddafi Stadium, Lahore on 3 September 2012. He praised the board's efforts to bring international cricket back to Pakistan and expressed his desire to see the Australian team playing in front of Pakistani spectators on home soil.

The Asian Cricket Council (ACC) Development Committee met in Islamabad on 24 September 2012, chaired by then-PCB Chairman Zaka Ashraf. He called on member nations to return to Pakistan for tours, and Chief Executive of ACC Syed Ashraful Haq said they felt no security concern in Pakistan and considered playing cricket here to be safe as anywhere in the world.

The then ICC Chief Executive, David Richardson, visited the National Cricket Academy on 12 January 2013 and pledged support to Pakistan's efforts to restore international cricket in the country.

=== Revival of international cricket ===
The revival began in 2015, when Zimbabwe became the first major international side to tour Pakistan in six years, playing three ODIs and two T20Is in Lahore.

This was followed by the ICC World XI's visit in Lahore in 2017 for the three-match Independence Cup under tight security, marking the return of multiple international players from several countries. The same year, the final of the Pakistan Super League was successfully staged in Lahore featuring many international players.

Following years saw the gradual relocation of all PSL matches to Pakistan. By 2020, the Pakistan Super League had been fully shifted from the United Arab Emirates to multiple Pakistani cities including Karachi, Lahore, Multan, and Rawalpindi, reflecting growing international confidence in security and infrastructure.

To support these developments, the PCB invested heavily in upgrading major cricket venues such as Gaddafi Stadium, National Stadium, Rawalpindi Cricket Stadium, and Multan Cricket Stadium to meet international broadcasting and security standards.

Between 2019 and 2023, Pakistan hosted full international series involving Sri Lanka, Bangladesh, West Indies, South Africa, Australia, England, and the New Zealand, marking a complete restoration of bilateral cricket on home soil.

In 2025, Pakistan successfully hosted the 2025 ICC Champions Trophy, marking the country's first major ICC tournament in nearly three decades. The Pakistan Super League is now held entirely in Pakistan, with matches played across Karachi, Lahore, Multan and Rawalpindi. By 2025, almost all ICC Full Member nations had toured Pakistan for bilateral series, PCB completed the full revival of international cricket in Pakistan.

== See also ==
- Pakistan Blind Cricket Council
- Pakistan Super League
- Pakistan Junior League
