= International cricket =

Cricket played by national teams

International cricket matches are played between the teams representing their nations, administrated by the International Cricket Council (ICC). The main forms are Test matches, ODI matches and T20I matches.

Most games are played as part of "tours" when one nation travels to another for a number of weeks or months and plays a number of matches of various sorts against the host nation. World Cups featuring several countries at once, are organized by the ICC. The ICC is also responsible for cricket games played at multi-sport events such as Olympic Games, Commonwealth Games, African Games, Asian Games, South Asian Games and Pacific Games.

In addition to ICC's administration, there are also five regional bodies, Asian Cricket Council, Africa Cricket Association, ICC Europe, ICC Americas and ICC East Asia-Pacific which aim to promote the sport of cricket in their respective continents.

== History ==
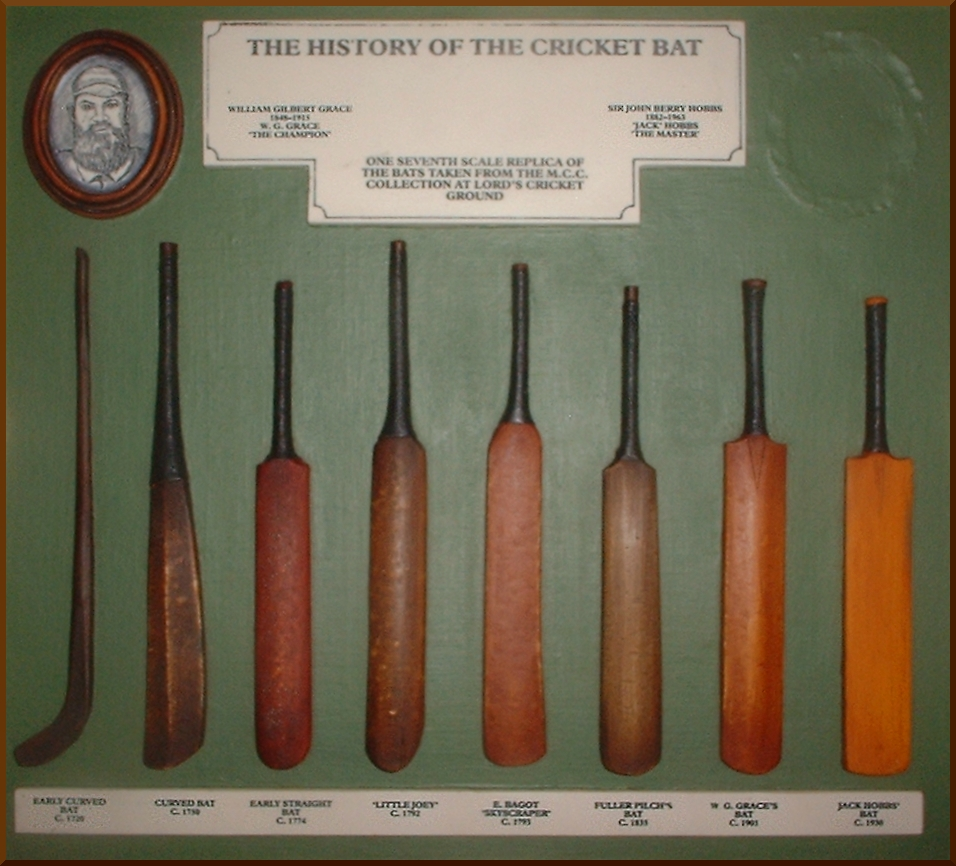
An artwork depicting the history of the cricket bat

There was no formal structure for international cricket until the early 20th century. In 1744, the Laws of Cricket were codified for the first time and then amended with new additions such as lbw and middle stump. The Marylebone Cricket Club (MCC), founded in 1787; immediately became the custodian of the Laws and has made periodic revisions and recodifications subsequently. The first international match was contested in 1844 between teams representing the United States and Canada, at St George's Cricket Club in New York. The ICC founded in 1909 as the Imperial Cricket Conference, overtook the governance of international cricket since, although the Laws of Cricket have remained under the governance of the MCC.

== Tours ==
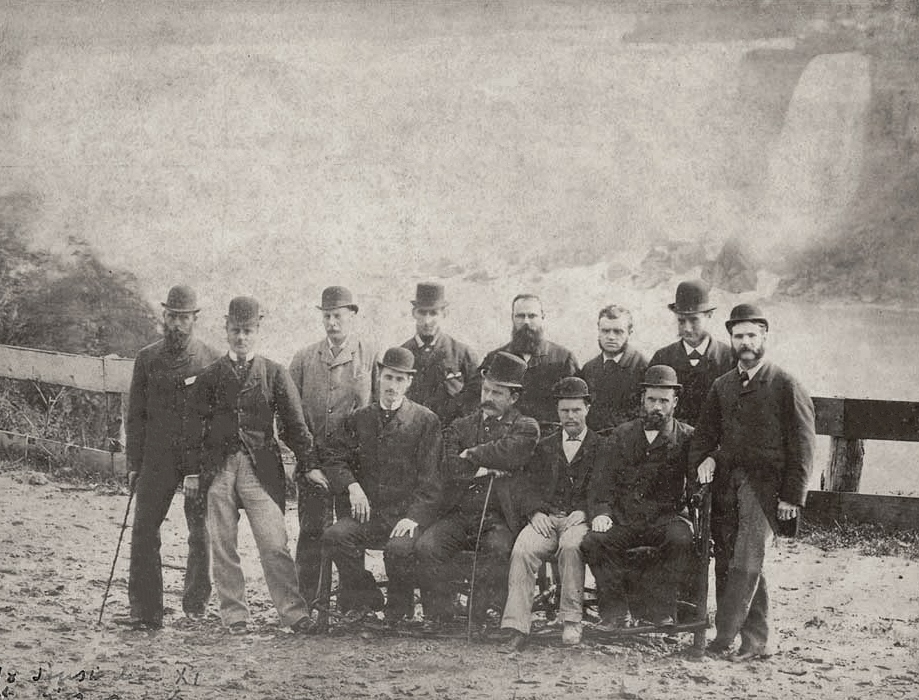
The first Australian touring team (1878) pictured at Niagara Falls

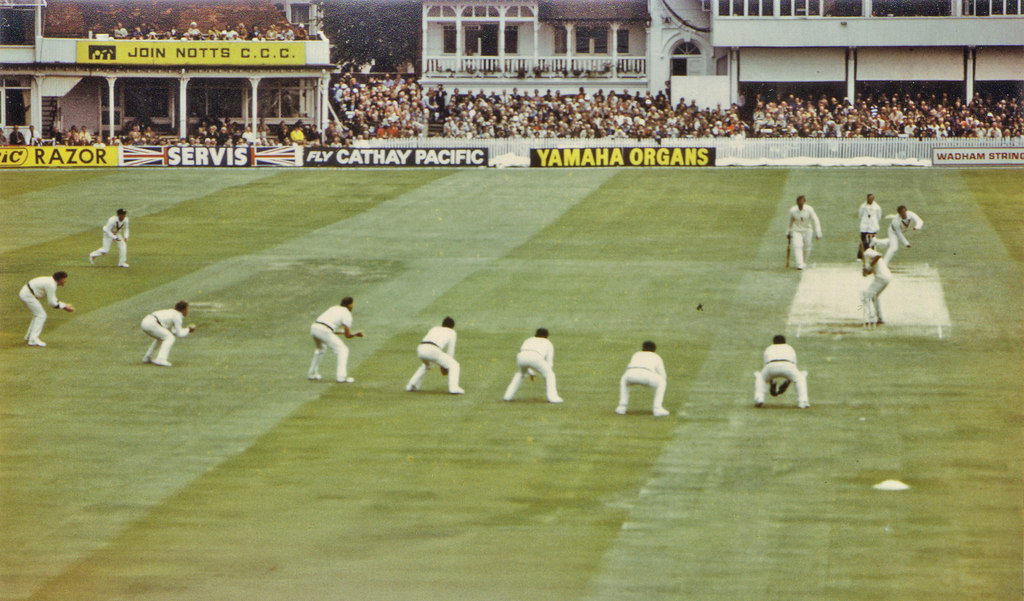
Trent Bridge during a 1981 Test match as part of the Ashes.

Most Test, ODI and T20I matches take place in the form of "tours". Test series can last from two to six matches, but some tours consist of only a single Test. Six-match series were common in the 1970s and early 1980s, with the last six-match series to date taking place in 1997–98 season between the West Indies and England. The Ashes in England were six-match Test series between 1981 and 1997, but Australia reverted to five matches in its home series from 1982 to 1983. ODI series generally last from three to seven matches. T20I series last from one to five matches. Tours may include a multi-team one-day tournament, often referred to as a "triangular" or "quadrangular" tournament.

Sometimes, a perpetual trophy is awarded to the winning team. Some notable perpetual trophies include:

- Anthony de Mello Trophy (IND v ENG in India)
- The Ashes (AUS v ENG)
- Basil D'Oliveira Trophy (ENG v SA)
- Benaud–Qadir Trophy (AUS v PAK)
- Border–Gavaskar Trophy (AUS v IND)
- Chappell–Hadlee Trophy (AUS v NZ)
- Clive Lloyd Trophy (WIN v ZIM)
- Crowe–Thorpe Trophy (NZ v ENG)
- Frank Worrell Trophy (WIN v AUS)
- Freedom Trophy (IND v SA)
- Pataudi Trophy / Anderson–Tendulkar Trophy (ENG v IND in England)
- Richards–Botham Trophy (ENG v WIN)
- Sir Vivian Richards Trophy (SA v WIN)
- Sobers–Tissera Trophy (WIN v SL)
- Southern Cross Trophy (AUS v ZIM)
- Tangiwai Shield (NZ v SA)
- Trans-Tasman Trophy (AUS v NZ)
- Warne–Muralitharan Trophy (AUS v SL)

=== ICC Future Tours Programme ===
The ICC Future Tours Programme (abbreviated as ICC FTP) is a schedule of international cricket tours and tournaments which structure the programme of cricket events for ICC full members and associate members with ODI status, over a period of time.

The FTP schedules bilateral cricket tours with the objective of each team playing each other at least once at home and once away over a period of 10 years known as the "Ten Year Plan" since 2006. If the cricket boards of two individual countries reach an agreement, they can play more than two series. The FTP also schedules associate tri-nation series with the objective of each team playing each other at least once at home, once away and once at a neutral venue over a cycle of 4 years since 2019. If a team does not want to travel to a particular country for a bilateral or tri-nation series due to security reasons, then, by the mutual agreement of the respective boards, that series can be shifted to a neutral venue such as the UAE or any other country where the facilities are deemed adequate.

Additionally, it has also scheduled ICC tournaments over a period of 4 years known as an "ICC Events cycle" since 2024. Each cycle consists of one men's Cricket World Cup, one women's Cricket World Cup, one ICC Champions Trophy, one ICC Women's Champions Trophy, two men's T20 World Cups and two women's T20 World Cups.

== International competitions ==
=== ICC tournaments ===
Tournament	Format	Last	Champions	Runners up	Next
Men
Cricket World Cup	ODI	2023	Australia	India	2027
T20 World Cup	T20I	2026	India	New Zealand	2028
World Test Championship	Test	2025	South Africa	Australia	2027
Champions Trophy	ODI	2025	India	New Zealand	2029
Women
Cricket World Cup	ODI	2025	India	South Africa	2029
T20 World Cup	T20I	2026	Australia	England	2028
Champions Trophy	T20I	—N/a	—N/a	—N/a	2027
Junior
U19 Men's World Cup	Y-ODI	2026	India	England	2028
U19 Women's World Cup	Y-T20I	2025	India	South Africa	2027

=== ICC qualifiers ===
Format	Competition	Latest	Topper	Next	Ref
Men's CWC Qualification
ODI	World Cricket League	2017–2019	Defunct		
ODI	Cricket World Cup Qualifier	2023	Sri Lanka	2027	
ODI	Cricket World Cup Qualifier Play-off	2023	United States	2027	
ODI	Cricket World Cup Super League	2020–2023	Defunct		
ODI	Cricket World Cup League 2	2019–2023	Scotland	2024–2026	
List A	Cricket World Cup Challenge League A	2022	Canada	2024 (Kenya)	
List A	Cricket World Cup Challenge League B	2022	Jersey	2024	
List A	Cricket World Cup Challenge League Play-off	2024	Kuwait	2027	
Women's CWC Qualification
ODI	Women's Cricket World Cup Qualifier	2025	Pakistan	2029	
ODI	ICC Women's Championship	2022–2025	Australia	2025–2029	
Men's T20WC Qualification
T20I	Men's T20 World Cup Qualifier	2022 (A • B)	Defunct		
T20I	Men's T20 World Cup Africa Qualifier	2022–23	Namibia	2025	
T20I	Men's T20 World Cup Americas Qualifier	2023	Canada	2025	
T20I	Men's T20 World Cup Asia Qualifier	2023	Oman	2025	
T20I	Men's T20 World Cup EAP Qualifier	2022–23	Papua New Guinea	2025	
T20I	Men's T20 World Cup Europe Qualifier	2022–23	Scotland	2025	
Women's T20WC Qualification
T20I	Women's T20 World Cup Qualifier	2024	Sri Lanka	2026	
T20I	Women's T20 World Cup Africa Qualifier	2023	Zimbabwe	2025	
T20I	Women's T20 World Cup Americas Qualifier	2025	United States	2027	
T20I	Women's T20 World Cup Asia Qualifier	2025	Thailand	2027	
T20I	Women's T20 World Cup EAP Qualifier	2023	Vanuatu	2025	
T20I	Women's T20 World Cup Europe Qualifier	2023	Scotland	2025	

=== Multi-sport events ===
Cricket was originally scheduled to be included in the inaugural Olympics in Athens but was cancelled due to insufficient entries. A men's cricket tournament was introduced as medal sport in the second Olympics but was cancelled in the following Olympics due to lack of entries. Both men's and women's cricket are to be reintroduced in the 2028 Olympics in Los Angeles. A men's cricket tournament was played at the 1998 Commonwealth Games, a women's cricket tournament was played at the 2022 Commonwealth Games, and both tournaments were to be included in the 2026 Commonwealth Games but was cancelled following the announcement of a streamlined event.

Both men's and women's cricket were introduced in the 2010 Asian Games, were removed in the 2018 Asian Games, and were reintroduced in the 2022 Asian Games. Men's cricket was played in the Pacific Games (South Pacific Games until 2007) since 1979, and women's cricket was played since 2015, until 2019 and both tournaments were removed in 2023 as a result of the Pacific Games charter amendment in 2019. A men's cricket tournament was played at the 2010 South Asian Games, and both men's cricket and women's cricket were introduced in the 2019 South Asian Games. Both men's cricket and women's cricket have been played in the SEA Games since 2017. Both men's cricket and women's cricket have been played in the African Games since 2023.

Format	Event	Last	Champions	Next	Ref.
Olympic Games
-	Men's	1900	Great Britain	2028	
T20I	Women's	—N/a	—N/a	2028	
Commonwealth Games
List A	Men's	1998	South Africa	2030	
T20I	Women's	2022	Australia	2030	
Asian Games
T20I	Men's	2026	India	2030	
T20I	Women's	2026	India	2030	
African Games
T20I	Men's	2023	Zimbabwe	2027	
T20I	Women's	2023	Zimbabwe	2027	
Pan American Games
T20I	Men's	—N/a	—N/a	2027	
T20I	Women's	—N/a	—N/a	2027	
Pacific Games
T20I	Men's	2019	Papua New Guinea	TBA	
T20I	Women's	2019	Samoa	TBA	
South Asian Games
T20I	Men's	2019	Bangladesh	2027	
T20I	Women's	2019	Bangladesh	2027	
SEA Games
T20I	Men's	2025	Malaysia	2027	
T20I	Women's	2025	Thailand	2027	

=== ACC events ===
The Men's and the Women's Asia Cup are the only two non-ICC competitions featured in the ICC Future Tours Programme.

Tournament	Latest	Champions	Runners up	Next	Ref
Men's Asia Cup	2025	India	Pakistan	2027	
Women's Asia Cup	2026	India	Sri Lanka	2028	

== International rankings ==
=== Test rankings ===
In essence, after every Test series, the two teams involved receive points based on a mathematical formula. The total of each team's points total is divided by the total number of matches to give a 'rating', and the Test-playing teams are by order of rating (this can be shown in a table).

From 2002 to 2019, the top-ranked Test team was awarded with the ICC Test Championship mace and the top team at each 1 April cut-off (until 2019) was also awarded a cash prize, the winners of which are listed below. The mace is now awarded to the winners of the ICC World Test Championship.

The following table shows the test mace won by each team:

Team	Test Mace won
Australia	9 (2002, 2003, 2004, 2005, 2006, 2007, 2008, 2009, 2016)
India	5 (2010, 2011, 2017, 2018, 2019)
South Africa	3 (2013, 2014, 2015)
England	1 (2012)

- Source: ICC

=== ODI rankings ===
The ICC ODI Team Rankings were created, and are run, by the ICC for reasons similar to the Test Rankings. The rankings are simply an international ranking scheme overlaid on the regular ODI (One Day International) match schedule. After every ODI match, the two teams involved receive points based on a mathematical formula. The total of each team's points total is divided by the total number of matches to give a rating, and all teams are ranked on a table in order of rating. The ranking does not replace the World Cup; the latter still carries much more significance to most cricket fans.

The ranking consisted two separate tables until merged into a single table in 2018. The ten ICC Full Members that play Test cricket were automatically listed on the main table while the six Associate Members with One Day International status were listed on a secondary table, but are eligible for promotion to the main table by meeting certain criteria.

=== T20I rankings ===
As with the Test and ODI Rankings, the ICC T20I Team Rankings are an international T20 ranking system run by the ICC. It is simply a ranking scheme overlaid on the regular T20I match schedule. After every T20I match, the two teams involved receive points based on a mathematical formula. The total of each team's points total is divided by the total number of matches to give a rating, and all teams are ranked on a table in order of rating. This ranking does not replace the ICC World Twenty20 competition.
