= England women's cricket team in Sri Lanka in 2026–27 =

International cricket tour

	Sri Lanka	England
- Dates: 1 February – 8 March 2027

One Day International series

Twenty20 International series

The England women's cricket team are scheduled to tour Sri Lanka from February to March 2027 to play three One Day Internationals (ODIs) and three Twenty20 International (T20I) matches against Sri Lanka women's cricket team. The T20I series will form part of both teams preparations for the 2027 ICC Women's Champions Trophy, while the ODI series will form part of the 2025–2029 ICC Women's Championship cycle. In October 2026, Sri Lanka Cricket (SLC) and England and Wales Cricket Board (ECB) confirmed the fixtures for the tour.

== Squads ==
Sri Lanka		England	
ODIs	T20Is	ODIs	T20Is

== T20I series ==
=== 1st T20I ===
1 February 2027
[Scorecard]

Sri Lanka	v	England

Pallekele International Cricket Stadium, Kandy

=== 2nd T20I ===
3 February 2027
[Scorecard]

Sri Lanka	v	England

Pallekele International Cricket Stadium, Kandy

=== 3rd T20I ===
5 February 2027
[Scorecard]

Sri Lanka	v	England

Pallekele International Cricket Stadium, Kandy

== ODI series ==
=== 1st ODI ===
4 March 2027
[Scorecard]

Sri Lanka	v	England

Rangiri Dambulla International Stadium, Dambulla

=== 2nd ODI ===
6 March 2027
[Scorecard]

Sri Lanka	v	England

Rangiri Dambulla International Stadium, Dambulla

=== 3rd ODI ===
8 March 2027
[Scorecard]

Sri Lanka	v	England

Rangiri Dambulla International Stadium, Dambulla
