= ICC Women's Champions Trophy =

International cricket competition

- Administrator: International Cricket Council
- Format: Women's Twenty20 International
- First edition: 2027: India
- Next edition: 2027: India
- Tournament format: see below
- Number of teams: 6

The ICC Women's Champions Trophy is an upcoming quadrennial international cricket competition in Women's Twenty20 International (WT20I) format, organised by the International Cricket Council (ICC). It will be inaugurated in 2027. The competition will be played by the top teams from the ICC Women's T20I Team Rankings.

== History ==
=== Background ===
The ICC conceived the idea of a short One Day International (ODI) cricket tournament to raise funds for the development of the sport in non-Test playing countries, and the ICC KnockOut Trophy was inaugurated in 1998 as a biennial competition to be hosted by associate countries. However since 2002, the tournament was moved to full member countries and rebranded as the ICC Champions Trophy, also known as the "Mini World Cup". In 2003, the England and Wales Cricket Board (ECB) introduced a 20-over per innings game to the county cricket. Soon after, the ICC adapted the Twenty20 International (T20I) format and introduced the ICC Men's T20 World Cup (then known as ICC World Twenty20) in 2007, followed by the ICC Women's T20 World Cup (then known as ICC Women's World Twenty20) in 2009. In 2009, the Champions Trophy was converted into a quadrennial tournament with 8 teams.

In April 2012, the ICC announced that the Champions Trophy would be discontinued after the 2013 edition. However, it was given one more edition and was discontinued after the 2017 edition and was replaced by the World Test Championship. In November 2021, as part of the 2024–2031 ICC men's hosts cycle, the ICC announced that the Champions Trophy would be revived in the ODI format from 2025 onwards. In July 2022, as part of the 2024–2027 ICC women's hosts cycle, the ICC announced that a Women's Champions Trophy in Women's Twenty20 International (WT20I) format will be introduced from 2027 onwards. In November 2024, the ICC revealed a new visual identity for the Champions Trophy tournaments.

=== Initial years (2027–present) ===
The inaugural tournament was set to take place in Sri Lanka from June to July 2027 featuring 6 teams. In June 2026, the ICC announced that the tournament would instead take place in February 2027. In August 2026, Sri Lanka was stripped of the hosting rights due to the government interference in the board. A few days later, Board of Control for Cricket in India (BCCI) was awarded the hosting rights, with the tournament scheduled to be held across two venues.

== Hosts ==
Host countries of Women's Champions Trophy

Summary of hosts by ICC region (2027)
Region	Year	Hosting body	Host(s)
Asia	2027	Board of Control for Cricket in India	India

== Format ==
=== Qualification ===
The top teams in the ICC Women's T20I Team Rankings during the qualification period, along with the hosts qualify for the tournament.

=== Tournament ===
The Champions Trophy will be played in two stages. The preliminary stage or first round is played in a round-robin format. The second round is played as a knockout stage of two teams. (Note: References for tournament formats: 2027) In case of a tie (that is, both teams scoring the same number of runs at the end of their respective innings), a Super Over is used to decide the winner. In the case of a tie occurring again in the Super Over, subsequent super overs would be played until there is a winner.

Summary of tournament formats (2027)
#	Year	Teams	Matches	Preliminary stage	Final stage
1	2027	6	16	Round-robin of 6 teams: 15 matches	Knockout of 2 teams: 1 match

== Attendance ==
Year	Total attendance	Ref.
2027	TBA	

== Summary ==
Details of Women's Champions Trophy tournaments
#	Year	Dates	Host(s)	Venues	Ref.
1	2027	14 – 28 February 2027	Board of Control for Cricket in India	2 in India	

=== Final results ===
Details of Women's Champions Trophy finals
Year	Final				Ref.
Year	Date & Venue	Winner	Victory margin	Runner-up	Ref.
2027	28 February 2027; TBA	To be determined	TBD	To be determined	

== Team performances ==
=== By tournament ===
An overview of the teams' performances in every Champions Trophy is given below.

Legend

- C Champions
- RU Runners-up
- R1 Preliminary round (first round)
- Q Qualified
- × Withdrew
- ×× Ineligible (suspended)
- * Hosts

† denotes current Test playing nations / ICC full members.

Team performances in each Women's Champions Trophy tournament
Edition (No. of teams)	2027 (6)	Apps
Host(s) Team	(India)	Apps
Australia†	Q	1
England†	Q	1
India†	Q* (Note: Sri Lanka Cricket was stripped of the hosting rights due to the government interference in the board, and Board of Control for Cricket in India was awarded the hosting rights for the 2027 tournament.)	1
New Zealand†	Q	1
South Africa†	Q	1
Sri Lanka†	Q	1
Ref.		

=== Overall ===
The table below provides a summary of the performances of teams over past Champions Trophys.

† denotes current Test playing nations / ICC full members.

Overall team performances in Women's Champions Trophy tournaments
Team (Note: Teams are ordered by their best performance, then winning percentage, then (if equal) by alphabetical order.)	Apps	Mat	Won	Lost	N/R	Win %	Best performance
Australia†	1						
England†	1						
India†	1						
New Zealand†	1						
South Africa†	1						
Sri Lanka†	1						
As of TBA Source: Cricinfo

=== Debutant teams by tournament ===
† denotes current Test playing nations / ICC full members.

Debutant teams in each Women's Champions Trophy tournament
Year	Debutant teams			Total
2027	Australia†	England†	India†	6
2027	New Zealand†	South Africa†	Sri Lanka†	6
Total				6

== See also ==
- ICC Future Tours Programme – International cricket scheduling that includes the Champions Trophy.
- List of ICC Champions Trophy centuries
- List of ICC Champions Trophy five-wicket hauls
