= 1997–98 Pepsi Triangular Series =

International cricket tournament

1997-98 Pepsi Triangular Series
- Date: 1–14 April 1998
- Location: India
- Result: Australia won the final by 4 wickets
- Player of the series: Ajay Jadeja (Ind)
Teams
Australia	India	Zimbabwe
Captains
Steve Waugh	Mohammad Azharuddin	Alistair Campbell
Most runs
Ricky Ponting 335	Ajay Jadeja 354	Grant Flower 283
Most wickets
Michael Kasprowicz Damien Fleming 9	Ajit Agarkar 10	Heath Streak 6

The 1997–98 Pepsi Triangular Series was a One Day International cricket tournament held in India in April 1998. It was a tri-nation series between the Australia, India and Zimbabwe. Australia defeated India in the final to win the tournament.

== Matches ==
=== 1st ODI ===
1 April 1998
Scorecard

India; 309/5 (50 overs)	v	Australia; 268 (45.5 overs)
Ajay Jadeja 105* (109); Michael Kasprowicz 3/50 (10 overs)		Michael Bevan 65 (82); Sachin Tendulkar 5/32 (10 overs)

India won by 41 runs
Jawaharlal Nehru Stadium, Kochi
Umpires: Shyam Bansal (Ind) and Arani Jayaprakash (Ind)
Player of the match: Sachin Tendulkar (Ind)

- India won the toss and elected to bat.
- Ajit Agarkar (India) made his ODI debut.
- Australia were fined one over for slow over rate

=== 2nd ODI ===
3 April 1998
Scorecard

Australia; 252/7 (50 overs)	v	Zimbabwe; 239 (49.5 overs)
Michael Bevan 65 (76); Heath Streak 2/48 (10 overs)		Alistair Campbell 102 (145); Damien Fleming 3/30 (10 overs)

Australia won by 13 runs
Sardar Patel Stadium, Ahmedabad
Umpires: Des Raj (Ind) and Borni Jamula (Ind)
Player of the match: Alistair Campbell (Zim)

- Australia won the toss and elected to bat.

=== 3rd ODI ===
5 April 1998
Scorecard

India; 274/5 (50 overs)	v	Zimbabwe; 261 (48.3 overs)
Sourav Ganguly 82 (129); Heath Streak 2/42 (10 overs)		Alistair Campbell 60 (69); Rahul Sanghvi 3/29 (8 overs)

India won by 13 runs
Reliance Stadium, Vadodara
Umpires: Jasbir Singh (Ind) and GA Pratapkumar (Ind)
Player of the match: Hrishikesh Kanitkar (Ind)

- Zimbabwe won the toss and elected to field.
- zimbabwe were fined one over for slow over rate

=== 4th ODI ===
7 April 1998
Scorecard

Australia; 222/9 (50 overs)	v	India; 223/4 (44.3 overs)
Ricky Ponting 84 (139); Ajit Agarkar 4/46 (10 overs)		Sachin Tendulkar 100 (89); Michael Kasprowicz 2/39 (10 overs)

India won by 6 wickets
Green Park Stadium, Kanpur
Umpires: Chandra Sathe (Ind) and MR Singh (Ind)
Player of the match: Sachin Tendulkar (Ind)

- Australia won the toss and elected to bat.

=== 5th ODI ===
9 April 1998
Scorecard

India; 301/3 (50 overs)	v	Zimbabwe; 269 (48.4 overs)
Mohammad Azharuddin 153* (150); Pommie Mbangwa 2/47 (9 overs)		Grant Flower 102 (118); Hrishikesh Kanitkar 2/26 (6.4 overs)

India won by 32 runs
Barabati Stadium, Cuttack
Umpires: Narendra Menon (Ind) and R Nagarajan (Ind)
Player of the match: Mohammad Azharuddin (Ind)

- Zimbabwe won the toss and elected to field.
- Mohammad Azharuddin and Ajay Jadeja's partnership of 275 runs was world record for any wicket in ODI.

=== 6th ODI ===
11 April 1998
Scorecard

Australia; 294/3 (50 overs)	v	Zimbabwe; 278/9 (50 overs)
Ricky Ponting 145 (158); Guy Whittall 1/52 (5 overs)		Grant Flower 89 (125); Damien Fleming 2/39 (10 overs)

Australia won by 16 runs
Feroz Shah Kotla Ground, Delhi
Umpires: Sankara Dendapani (Ind)
Player of the match: Ricky Ponting (Aus)

- India won the toss and elected to bat.
- Ricky Ponting played his 50th ODI. He equaled Dean Jones' record for the highest individual score by an Australia player in an ODI (145).
- Mark Waugh and Ricky Ponting's partnership of 219 runs was Australian record for second wicket in ODI.

=== Final ===
14 April 1998
Scorecard

India; 227 (49.3 overs)	v	Australia; 231/6 (48.4 overs)
Ajay Jadeja 48 (49); Damien Fleming 3/47 (10 overs)		Michael Bevan 75* (127); Anil Kumble 2/36 (9.4 overs)

Australia won by 4 wickets
Feroz Shah Kotla Ground, Delhi
Umpires: Vijay Chopra (Ind) and V. K. Ramaswamy (Ind)
Player of the match: Steve Waugh (Aus)

- India won the toss and elected to bat.
- Mohammad Azharuddin (Ind) became the second player to score 8,000 runs in ODIs.
