= International cricket in 1997–98 =

International cricket season

The 1997–1998 international cricket season was from September 1997 to April 1998.

== Season overview ==
International tours
Start date	Home team	Away team	Results [Matches]			
Start date	Home team	Away team	Test	ODI	FC	LA
18 September 1997	Zimbabwe	New Zealand	0–0 [2]	1–1 [3]	—	—
28 September 1997	Pakistan	India	—	2–1 [3]	—	—
6 October 1997	Pakistan	South Africa	0–1 [3]	—	—	—
7 November 1997	Australia	New Zealand	2–0 [3]	—	—	—
17 November 1997	Pakistan	West Indies	3–0 [3]	—	—	—
19 November 1997	India	Sri Lanka	0–0 [3]	1–1 [3]	—	—
26 December 1997	Australia	South Africa	1–0 [3]	—	—	—
7 January 1998	Sri Lanka	Zimbabwe	2–0 [2]	3–0 [3]	—	—
29 January 1998	West Indies	England	3–1 [6]	1–4 [5]	—	—
4 February 1998	New Zealand	Zimbabwe	2–0 [2]	4–1 [5]	—	—
8 February 1998	New Zealand	Australia	—	2–2 [4]	—	—
14 February 1998	South Africa	Pakistan	1–1 [3]	—	—	—
6 March 1998	India	Australia	2–1 [3]	—	—	—
14 March 1998	Zimbabwe	Pakistan	0–1 [2]	0–2 [2]	—	—
19 March 1998	South Africa	Sri Lanka	2–0 [2]	—	—	—
International tournaments
Start date	Tournament				Winners	
10 October 1997	(Kenya) President's Cup 1997-98				Zimbabwe	
1 November 1997	(Pakistan) 1997-98 Wills Quadrangular Tournament				South Africa	
4 December 1997	(Australia) 1997–98 Carlton and United Series				Australia	
11 December 1997	(United Arab Emirates) 1997–98 Singer Akai Champions Trophy				England	
10 January 1998	(Bangladesh) 1997-98 Silver Jubilee Independence Cup				India	
1 April 1998	(India) 1997–98 Pepsi Triangular Series				Australia	
3 April 1998	(South Africa) 1997-98 Standard Bank International One-Day Series				South Africa	
17 April 1998	(United Arab Emirates) 1997-98 Coca-Cola Cup				India	

== September ==
=== New Zealand in Zimbabwe ===
Test series
No.	Date	Home captain	Away captain	Venue	Result
Test 1378	18–22 September	Alistair Campbell	Stephen Fleming	Harare Sports Club, Harare	Match drawn
Test 1379	25–29 September	Alistair Campbell	Stephen Fleming	Queens Sports Club, Bulawayo	Match drawn
ODI series
No.	Date	Home captain	Away captain	Venue	Result
ODI 1235	1 October	Alistair Campbell	Stephen Fleming	Queens Sports Club, Bulawayo	Match tied
ODI 1237	4 October	Alistair Campbell	Stephen Fleming	Harare Sports Club, Harare	Zimbabwe by 3 wickets
ODI 1238	5 October	Alistair Campbell	Stephen Fleming	Harare Sports Club, Harare	New Zealand by 83 runs

=== India in Pakistan ===
ODI series
No.	Date	Home captain	Away captain	Venue	Result
ODI 1233	28 September	Saeed Anwar	Sachin Tendulkar	Niaz Stadium, Hyderabad	Pakistan by 5 wickets
ODI 1234	30 September	Saeed Anwar	Sachin Tendulkar	National Stadium, Karachi	India by 4 wickets
ODI 1236	2 October	Saeed Anwar	Sachin Tendulkar	Gaddafi Stadium, Lahore	Pakistan by 9 wickets

== October ==
=== South Africa in Pakistan ===
Test series
No.	Date	Home captain	Away captain	Venue	Result
Test 1380	6–10 October	Saeed Anwar	Hansie Cronje	Rawalpindi Cricket Stadium, Rawalpindi	Match drawn
Test 1381	17–21 October	Saeed Anwar	Hansie Cronje	Sheikhupura Stadium, Sheikhupura	Match drawn
Test 1382	24–27 October	Saeed Anwar	Hansie Cronje	Iqbal Stadium, Faisalabad	South Africa by 53 runs

=== President's Cup 1997-98 ===
Group stage
No.	Date	Team 1	Captain 1	Team 2	Captain 2	Venue	Result
ODI 1239	10 October	Kenya	Aasif Karim	Bangladesh	Akram Khan	Gymkhana Club Ground, Nairobi	Kenya by 150 runs
ODI 1240	11 October	Bangladesh	Akram Khan	Zimbabwe	Alistair Campbell	Gymkhana Club Ground, Nairobi	Zimbabwe by 48 runs
ODI 1241	12 October	Kenya	Aasif Karim	Zimbabwe	Alistair Campbell	Gymkhana Club Ground, Nairobi	Zimbabwe by 6 wickets
ODI 1242	14 October	Bangladesh	Akram Khan	Zimbabwe	Alistair Campbell	Aga Khan Sports Club Ground, Nairobi	Zimbabwe by 192 runs
ODI 1243	15 October	Kenya	Aasif Karim	Bangladesh	Akram Khan	Aga Khan Sports Club Ground, Nairobi	Kenya by 8 wickets
ODI 1244	16 October	Kenya	Aasif Karim	Zimbabwe	Alistair Campbell	Aga Khan Sports Club Ground, Nairobi	Zimbabwe by 7 wickets
Finals
No.	Date	Team 1	Captain 1	Team 2	Captain 2	Venue	Result
ODI 1245	18 October	Kenya	Aasif Karim	Zimbabwe	Alistair Campbell	Gymkhana Club Ground, Nairobi	Zimbabwe by 83 runs
ODI 1246	19 October	Kenya	Aasif Karim	Zimbabwe	Alistair Campbell	Gymkhana Club Ground, Nairobi	Zimbabwe by 82 runs

== November ==
=== Wills Quadrangular Tournament 1997-98 ===
Group stage
No.	Date	Team 1	Captain 1	Team 2	Captain 2	Venue	Result
ODI 1247	1 November	Sri Lanka	Arjuna Ranatunga	West Indies	Courtney Walsh	Gaddafi Stadium, Lahore	Sri Lanka by 7 wickets
ODI 1248	2 November	Pakistan	Wasim Akram	South Africa	Hansie Cronje	Gaddafi Stadium, Lahore	South Africa by 9 runs
ODI 1249	3 November	South Africa	Hansie Cronje	West Indies	Courtney Walsh	Gaddafi Stadium, Lahore	South Africa by 5 wickets
ODI 1250	4 November	Pakistan	Wasim Akram	West Indies	Courtney Walsh	Gaddafi Stadium, Lahore	Pakistan by 8 wickets
ODI 1251	5 November	Pakistan	Wasim Akram	Sri Lanka	Arjuna Ranatunga	Gaddafi Stadium, Lahore	Sri Lanka by 8 wickets
ODI 1252	6 November	South Africa	Hansie Cronje	Sri Lanka	Arjuna Ranatunga	Gaddafi Stadium, Lahore	South Africa by 66 runs
Final
No.	Date	Team 1	Captain 1	Team 2	Captain 2	Venue	Result
ODI 1253	8 November	South Africa	Hansie Cronje	Sri Lanka	Arjuna Ranatunga	Gaddafi Stadium, Lahore	South Africa by 4 wickets

=== New Zealand in Australia ===
Trans-Tasman Trophy - Test series
No.	Date	Home captain	Away captain	Venue	Result
Test 1383	7–11 October	Mark Taylor	Stephen Fleming	The Gabba, Brisbane	Australia by 186 runs
Test 1386	20–23 October	Mark Taylor	Stephen Fleming	WACA Ground, Perth	Australia by an innings and 70 runs
Test 1388	27 November–1 December	Mark Taylor	Stephen Fleming	Bellerive Oval, Hobart	Match drawn

=== West Indies in Pakistan ===
Test series
No.	Date	Home captain	Away captain	Venue	Result
Test 1384	17–20 November	Wasim Akram	Courtney Walsh	Arbab Niaz Stadium, Peshawar	Pakistan by an innings 19 runs
Test 1389	29 November–3 December	Wasim Akram	Courtney Walsh	Rawalpindi Cricket Stadium, Rawalpindi	Pakistan by an innings 29 runs
Test 1391	6–9 December	Wasim Akram	Courtney Walsh	National Stadium, Karachi	Pakistan by 10 wickets

=== Sri Lanka in India ===
Test series
No.	Date	Home captain	Away captain	Venue	Result
Test 1385	19–23 November	Sachin Tendulkar	Arjuna Ranatunga	Punjab Cricket Association IS Bindra Stadium, Mohali	Match drawn
Test 1387	26–30 November	Sachin Tendulkar	Arjuna Ranatunga	Vidarbha Cricket Association Ground, Nagpur	Match drawn
Test 1390	3–7 December	Sachin Tendulkar	Arjuna Ranatunga	Wankhede Stadium, Mumbai	Match drawn
ODI series
No.	Date	Home captain	Away captain	Venue	Result
ODI 1267	22 December	Sachin Tendulkar	Arjuna Ranatunga	Nehru Stadium, Guwahati	India by 7 wickets
ODI 1268	25 December	Sachin Tendulkar	Arjuna Ranatunga	Nehru Stadium, Indore	No result
ODI 1269	28 December	Sachin Tendulkar	Arjuna Ranatunga	Fatorda Stadium, Margao	Sri Lanka by 5 wickets

== December ==
=== Carlton and United Series 1997–98 ===
Group stage
No.	Date	Team 1	Captain 1	Team 2	Captain 2	Venue	Result
ODI 1254	4 December	Australia	Steve Waugh	South Africa	Hansie Cronje	Sydney Cricket Ground, Sydney	South Africa by 67 runs
ODI 1255	6 December	New Zealand	Stephen Fleming	South Africa	Hansie Cronje	Adelaide Oval, Adelaide	New Zealand by 47 runs
ODI 1256	7 December	Australia	Steve Waugh	New Zealand	Stephen Fleming	Adelaide Oval, Adelaide	Australia by 3 wickets
ODI 1257	9 December	Australia	Steve Waugh	South Africa	Hansie Cronje	Melbourne Cricket Ground, Melbourne	South Africa by 45 runs
ODI 1258	11 December	New Zealand	Stephen Fleming	South Africa	Hansie Cronje	Bellerive Oval, Hobart	South Africa by 1 run
ODI 1265	17 December	Australia	Steve Waugh	New Zealand	Stephen Fleming	Melbourne Cricket Ground, Melbourne	Australia by 6 wickets
ODI 1270	9 January	New Zealand	Stephen Fleming	South Africa	Hansie Cronje	The Gabba, Brisbane	South Africa by 2 runs
ODI 1272	11 January	Australia	Steve Waugh	South Africa	Hansie Cronje	The Gabba, Brisbane	South Africa by 5 wickets
ODI 1275	14 January	Australia	Shane Warne	New Zealand	Stephen Fleming	Sydney Cricket Ground, Sydney	Australia by 131 runs
ODI 1278	16 January	New Zealand	Stephen Fleming	South Africa	Hansie Cronje	WACA Ground, Perth	South Africa by 67 runs
ODI 1280	18 January	Australia	Steve Waugh	South Africa	Hansie Cronje	WACA Ground, Perth	South Africa by 7 wickets
ODI 1281	21 January	Australia	Steve Waugh	New Zealand	Stephen Fleming	Melbourne Cricket Ground, Melbourne	New Zealand by 4 wickets
Finals
No.	Date	Team 1	Captain 1	Team 2	Captain 2	Venue	Result
ODI 1283	23 January	Australia	Steve Waugh	South Africa	Hansie Cronje	Melbourne Cricket Ground, Melbourne	South Africa by 6 runs
ODI 1285	26 January	Australia	Steve Waugh	South Africa	Hansie Cronje	Sydney Cricket Ground, Sydney	Australia by 7 wickets
ODI 1287	27 January	Australia	Steve Waugh	South Africa	Hansie Cronje	Sydney Cricket Ground, Sydney	Australia by 14 runs

=== Akai-Singer Champions Trophy 1997-98 ===
Group stage
No.	Date	Team 1	Captain 1	Team 2	Captain 2	Venue	Result
ODI 1259	11 December	England	Adam Hollioake	India	Sachin Tendulkar	Sharjah Cricket Stadium, Sharjah	England by 7 runs
ODI 1260	12 December	Pakistan	Wasim Akram	West Indies	Courtney Walsh	Sharjah Cricket Stadium, Sharjah	West Indies by 43 runs
ODI 1261	13 December	England	Adam Hollioake	West Indies	Courtney Walsh	Sharjah Cricket Stadium, Sharjah	England by 4 wickets
ODI 1262	14 December	India	Sachin Tendulkar	Pakistan	Wasim Akram	Sharjah Cricket Stadium, Sharjah	Pakistan by 4 wickets
ODI 1263	15 December	England	Adam Hollioake	Pakistan	Wasim Akram	Sharjah Cricket Stadium, Sharjah	England by 8 runs
ODI 1264	16 December	India	Sachin Tendulkar	West Indies	Courtney Walsh	Sharjah Cricket Stadium, Sharjah	West Indies by 41 runs
Final
No.	Date	Team 1	Captain 1	Team 2	Captain 2	Venue	Result
ODI 1266	19 December	England	Adam Hollioake	West Indies	Courtney Walsh	Sharjah Cricket Stadium, Sharjah	England by 3 wickets

=== South Africa in Australia ===
Test series
No.	Date	Home captain	Away captain	Venue	Result
Test 1392	26–30 December	Mark Taylor	Hansie Cronje	Melbourne Cricket Ground, Melbourne	Match drawn
Test 1393	2–5 January	Mark Taylor	Hansie Cronje	Sydney Cricket Ground, Sydney	Australia by an innings 21 runs
Test 1397	30 January–3 February	Mark Taylor	Hansie Cronje	Adelaide Oval, Adelaide	Match drawn

== January ==
=== Silver Jubilee Independence Cup 1997-98 ===
Group stage
No.	Date	Team 1	Captain 1	Team 2	Captain 2	Venue	Result
ODI 1271	10 January	Bangladesh	Akram Khan	India	Mohammad Azharuddin	Bangabandhu National Stadium, Dhaka	India by 4 wickets
ODI 1273	11 January	India	Mohammad Azharuddin	Pakistan	Rashid Latif	Bangabandhu National Stadium, Dhaka	India by 18 runs
ODI 1274	10 January	Bangladesh	Akram Khan	Pakistan	Rashid Latif	Bangabandhu National Stadium, Dhaka	Pakistan by 9 wickets
Finals
No.	Date	Team 1	Captain 1	Team 2	Captain 2	Venue	Result
ODI 1276	14 January	India	Mohammad Azharuddin	Pakistan	Rashid Latif	Bangabandhu National Stadium, Dhaka	India by 8 wickets
ODI 1277	16 January	India	Mohammad Azharuddin	Pakistan	Rashid Latif	Bangabandhu National Stadium, Dhaka	Pakistan by 6 wickets
ODI 1279	18 January	India	Mohammad Azharuddin	Pakistan	Rashid Latif	Bangabandhu National Stadium, Dhaka	India by 3 wickets

=== Zimbabwe in Sri Lanka ===
Test series
No.	Date	Home captain	Away captain	Venue	Result
Test 1394	7–11 January	Arjuna Ranatunga	Alistair Campbell	Asgiriya Stadium, Kandy	Sri Lanka by 8 wickets
Test 1395	14–18 January	Arjuna Ranatunga	Alistair Campbell	Singhalese Sports Club Cricket Ground, Colombo	Sri Lanka by 5 wickets
ODI series
No.	Date	Home captain	Away captain	Venue	Result
ODI 1282	22 January	Arjuna Ranatunga	Alistair Campbell	Singhalese Sports Club Cricket Ground, Colombo	Sri Lanka by 5 wickets
ODI 1284	24 January	Arjuna Ranatunga	Alistair Campbell	R. Premadasa Stadium, Colombo	Sri Lanka by 5 wickets
ODI 1286	26 January	Sanath Jayasuriya	Alistair Campbell	Singhalese Sports Club Cricket Ground, Colombo	Sri Lanka by 4 wickets

=== England in the West Indies ===
Wisden Trophy - Test series
No.	Date	Home captain	Away captain	Venue	Result
Test 1396	29 January–2 February	Brian Lara	Michael Atherton	Sabina Park, Kingston	Match drawn
Test 1398	5–9 February	Brian Lara	Michael Atherton	Queen's Park Oval, Port of Spain	West Indies by 3 wickets
Test 1399	13–17 February	Brian Lara	Michael Atherton	Queen's Park Oval, Port of Spain	England by 3 wickets
Test 1404	27 February–2 March	Brian Lara	Michael Atherton	Bourda, Georgetown	West Indies by 242 runs
Test 1407	12–16 March	Brian Lara	Michael Atherton	Kensington Oval, Bridgetown	Match drawn
Test 1411	20–24 March	Brian Lara	Michael Atherton	Antigua Recreation Ground, St John's	West Indies by an innings and 52 runs
ODI series
No.	Date	Home captain	Away captain	Venue	Result
ODI 1299	29 March	Brian Lara	Adam Hollioake	Kensington Oval, Bridgetown	England by 16 runs
ODI 1301	1 April	Brian Lara	Adam Hollioake	Kensington Oval, Bridgetown	West Indies by 1 wicket
ODI 1304	4 April	Brian Lara	Adam Hollioake	Arnos Vale Ground, Kingstown	West Indies by 5 wickets
ODI 1307	5 April	Brian Lara	Adam Hollioake	Arnos Vale Ground, Kingstown	West Indies by 4 wickets
ODI 1310	5 April	Brian Lara	Adam Hollioake	Queen's Park Oval, Port of Spain	West Indies by 57 runs

== February ==
=== Zimbabwe in New Zealand ===
ODI series
No.	Date	Home captain	Away captain	Venue	Result
ODI 1288	4 February	Stephen Fleming	Alistair Campbell	Seddon Park, Hamilton	New Zealand by 40 runs
ODI 1289	6 February	Stephen Fleming	Alistair Campbell	Basin Reserve, Wellington	New Zealand by 8 wickets
ODI 1294	4 March	Stephen Fleming	Alistair Campbell	AMI Stadium, Christchurch	Zimbabwe by 1 run
ODI 1295	6 March	Stephen Fleming	Alistair Campbell	McLean Park, Napier	New Zealand by 9 wickets
ODI 1296	8 March	Stephen Fleming	Alistair Campbell	Eden Park, Auckland	New Zealand by 2 runs
Test series
No.	Date	Home captain	Away captain	Venue	Result
Test 1401	19–22 February	Stephen Fleming	Alistair Campbell	Basin Reserve, Wellington	New Zealand by 10 wickets
Test 1402	26–28 February	Stephen Fleming	Alistair Campbell	Eden Park, Auckland	New Zealand by an innings and 13 runs

=== Australia in New Zealand ===
ODI series
No.	Date	Home captain	Away captain	Venue	Result
ODI 1290	8 February	Stephen Fleming	Steve Waugh	AMI Stadium, Christchurch	Australia by 7 wickets
ODI 1291	10 February	Stephen Fleming	Steve Waugh	Basin Reserve, Wellington	Australia by 66 runs
ODI 1292	12 February	Stephen Fleming	Steve Waugh	McLean Park, Napier	New Zealand by 7 wickets
ODI 1293	14 February	Stephen Fleming	Steve Waugh	Eden Park, Auckland	New Zealand by 30 runs

=== Pakistan in South Africa ===
Test series
No.	Date	Home captain	Away captain	Venue	Result
Test 1400	14–18 February	Gary Kirsten	Aamer Sohail	The Wanderers Stadium, Johannesburg	Match drawn
Test 1403	26 February–2 March	Hansie Cronje	Aamer Sohail	Kingsmead Cricket Ground, Durban	Pakistan by 29 runs
Test 1406	6–10 March	Hansie Cronje	Rashid Latif	St George's Park, Port Elizabeth	South Africa by 259 runs

== March ==
=== Australia in India ===
Border–Gavaskar Trophy - Test series
No.	Date	Home captain	Away captain	Venue	Result
Test 1405	6–10 March	Mohammad Azharuddin	Mark Taylor	MA Chidambaram Stadium, Chennai	India by 179 runs
Test 1409	18–21 March	Mohammad Azharuddin	Mark Taylor	Eden Gardens, Kolkata	India by an innings and 219 runs
Test 1413	25–28 March	Mohammad Azharuddin	Mark Taylor	M. Chinnaswamy Stadium, Bangalore	Australia by 8 wickets

=== Pakistan in Zimbabwe ===
Test series
No.	Date	Home captain	Away captain	Venue	Result
Test 1408	14–18 March	Alistair Campbell	Rashid Latif	Queens Sports Club, Bulawayo	Match drawn
Test 1412	21–25 March	Alistair Campbell	Rashid Latif	Harare Sports Club, Harare	Pakistan by 3 wickets
ODI series
No.	Date	Home captain	Away captain	Venue	Result
ODI 1297	28 March	Alistair Campbell	Rashid Latif	Harare Sports Club, Harare	Pakistan by 4 wickets
ODI 1298	29 March	Alistair Campbell	Rashid Latif	Harare Sports Club, Harare	Pakistan by 4 wickets

=== Sri Lanka in South Africa ===
Test series
No.	Date	Home captain	Away captain	Venue	Result
Test 1410	19–23 March	Hansie Cronje	Arjuna Ranatunga	Newlands Cricket Ground, Cape Town	South Africa by 70 runs
Test 1414	27–30 March	Hansie Cronje	Arjuna Ranatunga	SuperSport Park, Centurion	South Africa by 6 wickets

== April ==
=== Pepsi Triangular Series 1997-98 ===
Group stage
No.	Date	Team 1	Captain 1	Team 2	Captain 2	Venue	Result
ODI 1300	1 April	India	Mohammad Azharuddin	Australia	Steve Waugh	Nehru Stadium, Kochi	India by 41 runs
ODI 1302	3 April	Australia	Steve Waugh	Zimbabwe	Alistair Campbell	Sardar Patel Stadium, Ahmedabad	Australia by 13 runs
ODI 1305	5 April	India	Mohammad Azharuddin	Zimbabwe	Alistair Campbell	Reliance Stadium, Vadodara	India by 13 runs
ODI 1308	7 April	India	Mohammad Azharuddin	Australia	Steve Waugh	Green Park Stadium, Kanpur	India by 6 wickets
ODI 1311	9 April	India	Mohammad Azharuddin	Zimbabwe	Alistair Campbell	Barabati Stadium, Cuttack	India by 32 runs
ODI 1313	11 April	Australia	Steve Waugh	Zimbabwe	Alistair Campbell	Feroz Shah Kotla, Delhi	Australia by 16 runs
Final
No.	Date	Team 1	Captain 1	Team 2	Captain 2	Venue	Result
ODI 1316	14 April	India	Mohammad Azharuddin	Australia	Steve Waugh	Feroz Shah Kotla, Delhi	Australia by 4 wickets

=== Standard Bank International One-Day Series 1997–98 ===
Group stage
No.	Date	Team 1	Captain 1	Team 2	Captain 2	Venue	Result
ODI 1303	3 April	South Africa	Hansie Cronje	Pakistan	Aamer Sohail	Kingsmead Cricket Ground, Durban	South Africa by 52 runs
ODI 1306	5 April	South Africa	Hansie Cronje	Sri Lanka	Arjuna Ranatunga	The Wanderers Stadium, Johannesburg	South Africa by 57 runs
ODI 1309	7 April	Pakistan	Rashid Latif	Sri Lanka	Arjuna Ranatunga	Diamond Oval, Kimberley	Pakistan by 4 wickets
ODI 1312	9 April	Pakistan	Rashid Latif	Sri Lanka	Arjuna Ranatunga	Boland Park, Paarl	Pakistan by 110 runs
ODI 1314	11 April	South Africa	Hansie Cronje	Pakistan	Rashid Latif	Buffalo Park, East London	South Africa by 3 wickets
ODI 1315	13 April	South Africa	Hansie Cronje	Sri Lanka	Arjuna Ranatunga	St George's Park, Port Elizabeth	Sri Lanka by 6 wickets
ODI 1317	15 April	Pakistan	Rashid Latif	Sri Lanka	Arjuna Ranatunga	Willowmoore Park, Benoni	Sri Lanka by 115 runs
ODI 1318	17 April	South Africa	Hansie Cronje	Pakistan	Rashid Latif	SuperSport Park, Centurion	South Africa by 7 wickets
ODI 1321	19 April	South Africa	Hansie Cronje	Sri Lanka	Arjuna Ranatunga	Mangaung Oval, Bloemfontein	South Africa by 5 wickets
Final
No.	Date	Team 1	Captain 1	Team 2	Captain 2	Venue	Result
ODI 1326	23 April	South Africa	Hansie Cronje	Pakistan	Rashid Latif	Newlands Cricket Ground, Cape Town	South Africa by 9 wickets

=== Coca-Cola Cup 1997–98 ===
Group stage
No.	Date	Team 1	Captain 1	Team 2	Captain 2	Venue	Result
ODI 1319	17 April	India	Mohammad Azharuddin	New Zealand	Stephen Fleming	Sharjah Cricket Stadium, Sharjah	India by 15 runs
ODI 1320	18 April	Australia	Steve Waugh	New Zealand	Stephen Fleming	Sharjah Cricket Stadium, Sharjah	Australia by 6 wickets
ODI 1322	19 April	Australia	Steve Waugh	India	Mohammad Azharuddin	Sharjah Cricket Stadium, Sharjah	Australia by 58 runs
ODI 1323	20 April	India	Mohammad Azharuddin	New Zealand	Stephen Fleming	Sharjah Cricket Stadium, Sharjah	New Zealand by 4 wickets
ODI 1324	21 April	Australia	Steve Waugh	New Zealand	Stephen Fleming	Sharjah Cricket Stadium, Sharjah	Australia by 5 wickets
ODI 1325	22 April	Australia	Steve Waugh	India	Mohammad Azharuddin	Sharjah Cricket Stadium, Sharjah	Australia by 26 runs
Final
No.	Date	Team 1	Captain 1	Team 2	Captain 2	Venue	Result
ODI 1327	24 April	Australia	Steve Waugh	India	Mohammad Azharuddin	Sharjah Cricket Stadium, Sharjah	India by 6 wickets
