= ICC Future Tours Programme =

International cricket tour programme

The ICC Future Tours Programme (ICC FTP) is a schedule of international cricket tours and tournaments which structure the programme of cricket events for International Cricket Council (ICC) full members and associate members with One Day International (ODI) status, over a period of time.

The FTP schedules bilateral cricket tours with the objective of each team playing each other at least once at home and once away over a period of 10 years known as the "Ten Year Plan" since 2006. If the cricket boards of two individual countries reach an agreement, they can play more than two series. The FTP also schedules associate tri-nation series with the objective of each team playing each other at least once at home, once away and once at a neutral venue over a cycle of four years since 2019. If a team does not want to travel to a particular country for a bilateral or tri-nation series due to security reasons, then, by the mutual agreement of the respective boards, that series can be shifted to a neutral venue such as the United Arab Emirates or any other country where the facilities are deemed adequate.

Additionally, it has also scheduled ICC tournaments over a period of four years known as an "ICC Events cycle" since 2024. Each cycle consists of one men's Cricket World Cup, one women's Cricket World Cup, one ICC Champions Trophy, one ICC Women's Champions Trophy, two men's T20 World Cups, two women's T20 World Cups, two Under-19 Men's Cricket World Cups and two Under-19 Women's T20 World Cups. Along with the tournaments included in the Events cycle the FTP also includes Cricket at the Summer Olympics.

== List of FTPs ==
- As of January 2026, four Men's Future Tours Programmes have been announced.
  1. The 2006–2012 Men's FTP was announced on 9 May 2006. It was the first Men's FTP to be released under the ICC's "Ten Year Plan" and featured 10 nations.
  2. The 2015–2019 Men's FTP was released on 30 November 2014, after the scheduling conflicts with the initial 2011–2020 Men's FTP draft were resolved and featured 10 nations.
  3. The 2018–2023 Men's FTP was announced on 20 June 2018 and it consisted of over 2000 matches between 13 nations. It included the fixtures for the first two WTC cycles (2019–2021 and 2021–2023) along with the first Super League cycle (2020–2023). Moreover, the ICC also granted T20I status to all then affiliate members promoting them as associate members with T20I status.
  4. The 2023–2027 Men's FTP was announced on 17 August 2022 and it consisted of over 770 matches between 13 nations. It included the fixtures for the next two WTC cycles (2023–2025 and 2025–2027); while the Super League was discontinued.
  5. The 2027–2031 Men's FTP will be announced in November 2026.
- As of January 2026, two Women's Future Tours Programmes have been announced.
  1. The 2022–2025 Women's FTP was announced on 16 August 2022. It was the first Women's FTP and it consisted of over 300 matches between 10 nations. It included the fixtures for the 2022–2025 Women's Championship cycle.
  2. The 2025–2029 Women's FTP was announced on 4 November 2024 and it consisted of over 400 matches between 11 nations. It included the fixtures for the 2025–2029 Women's Championship cycle.
- As of January 2026, two Associate Men's Future Tours Programmes have been announced.
  1. The 2019–2022 Associate Men's FTP was announced on 7 May 2019 and featured the 7 nations participating in the inaugural 2019–2023 League 2 cycle. Due to the fixtures affected by the COVID-19 pandemic, a revised 2019–2023 Associate Men's FTP was released on 4 March 2022.
  2. The 2024–2027 Associate Men's FTP was announced on 12 February 2024 and featured the 8 nations participating in the 2024–2026 League 2 cycle.

== ICC events cycle ==
=== Men's events cycle ===
- The 2024–2027 men's events cycle and the 2028–2031 men's events cycle along with the 2024–2031 men's hosts cycle were announced on 16 November 2021.
- The 2028–2031 men's events cycle (revised) and the 2032–2035 men's events cycle were announced on 15 November 2026.

=== Women's events cycle ===
- The 2024–2027 women's events cycle along with the 2024–2027 women's hosts cycle were announced on 26 July 2022.

=== Under-19 events cycle ===
- The 2024–2027 under-19 events cycle along with the 2024–2027 under-19 hosts cycle were announced on 13 November 2022.

== Tournaments summary ==
=== Men's tournaments ===
Tournaments included in the ICC Men's Future Tour Programme
FTP	Championship (Note: World Test Championship (WTC) spans across two years, is made up of bilateral Test cricket events and is included in the FTP.; CWC Super League spanned across four years, was made up of bilateral One Day International (ODI) events included in the FTP and served as part of the Cricket World Cup qualification pathway.; CWC League 2 spans across four years, is made up of tri-nation One Day International (ODI) events included in the FTP and serves as part of the Cricket World Cup qualification pathway.)	ICC events & hosts (Note: Only the hosts that were announced as part of the FTP or the hosts cycle.)	Other events (Note: Competitions that are included in the FTP, but not part of the events cycle or the hosts cycle.)	Events cycle	Hosts cycle
2006–2012	—N/a	Oct – Nov 2006: Champions Trophy	Nov 2006: Afro-Asia Cup (later cancelled)	—N/a	
2006–2012	—N/a	Mar – Apr 2007: Cricket World Cup Sep 2007: World Twenty20	Jun 2007: Afro-Asia Cup	—N/a	
2006–2012	—N/a	Sep 2008: Champions Trophy (later postponed to 2009)	Jun 2008: Asia Cup	—N/a	
2006–2012	—N/a	Jun 2009: World Twenty20	—N/a	—N/a	
2006–2012	—N/a	Apr 2010: World Twenty20	Jun 2010: Asia Cup	—N/a	
2006–2012	—N/a	Feb – Mar 2011: Cricket World Cup	—N/a	—N/a	
2012–2014 (Note: Although an FTP wasn't released between 2012 and 2014, these events are included here for comparison; Based on the 2011–2020 FTP draft.)	—N/a	Sep – Oct 2012: World Twenty20; Sri Lanka	Mar 2012: Asia Cup; Bangladesh Oct 2012: CLT20	—N/a	
2012–2014	—N/a	Jun 2013: Champions Trophy; England	Sep 2013: CLT20	—N/a	
2012–2014	—N/a	Mar –Apr 2014: World Twenty20; Bangladesh	Sep 2014: CLT20	—N/a	
2015–2019	—N/a	Feb – Mar 2015: Cricket World Cup; Australia & New Zealand	—N/a	—N/a	
2015–2019	—N/a	Mar – Apr 2016: World Twenty20; India	Mar 2016: Asia Cup	—N/a	
2015–2019	—N/a	Jun 2017: Champions Trophy; England	—N/a	—N/a	
2015–2019 & 2018–2023	—N/a	—N/a	Jun 2018: Asia Cup	—N/a	
2015–2019 & 2018–2023	2019–2021 WTC 2020–2023 Super League 2019–2023 League 2	May – July 2019: Cricket World Cup; England	—N/a	—N/a	
2018–2023 2019–2023†	2019–2021 WTC 2020–2023 Super League 2019–2023 League 2	Oct – Nov 2020: World Twenty20 (later postponed to 2022)	Sep 2020: Asia Cup (later cancelled)	—N/a	
2018–2023 2019–2023†	2021–2023 WTC 2020–2023 Super League 2019–2023 League 2	Jun 2021: WTC Final Oct – Nov 2021: T20 World Cup	—N/a	—N/a	
2018–2023 2019–2023†	2021–2023 WTC 2020–2023 Super League 2019–2023 League 2	—N/a	Sep 2022: Asia Cup	—N/a	
2023–2027 2024–2027†	2023–2025 WTC 2024–2026 League 2	Jun 2023: WTC Final Jun – Jul 2023: CWC Qualifier Oct – Nov 2023: Cricket World Cup; India	Sep 2023: Asia Cup	—N/a	
2023–2027 2024–2027†	2023–2025 WTC 2024–2026 League 2	Jun 2024: T20 World Cup; West Indies & United States	—N/a	2024–2027	2024–2031
2023–2027 2024–2027†	2025–2027 WTC 2024–2026 League 2	Feb – Mar 2025: Champions Trophy; Pakistan Jun 2025: WTC Final	Sep 2025: Asia Cup	2024–2027	2024–2031
2023–2027 2024–2027†	2025–2027 WTC 2024–2026 League 2	Feb – Mar 2026: T20 World Cup; India & Sri Lanka	—N/a	2024–2027	2024–2031
2027–2031 TBA†	2027–2029 WTC	Jun 2027: WTC Final Oct – Nov 2027: Cricket World Cup; South Africa, Zimbabwe & Namibia	—N/a	2024–2027	2024–2031
2027–2031 TBA†	2027–2029 WTC	Jul 2028: Summer Olympics; Los Angeles Oct – Nov 2028: T20 World Cup; Australia & New Zealand	—N/a	2028–2031	2024–2031
2027–2031 TBA†	2029–2031 WTC	Jun 2029: WTC Final Oct 2029: Champions Trophy; India	—N/a	2028–2031	2024–2031
2027–2031 TBA†	2029–2031 WTC	Jul – Aug 2030: T20 World Cup; England, Wales, Ireland & Scotland	—N/a	2028–2031	2024–2031
TBA	2031–2033 WTC	Jun 2031: WTC Final Oct – Nov 2031: Cricket World Cup; India & Bangladesh	—N/a	2028–2031	2024–2031
TBA	2031–2033 WTC	Jul 2032: Summer Olympics; Brisbane Oct – Nov 2032: T20 World Cup	—N/a	2032–2035	TBA
TBA	2033–2035 WTC	Jun 2033: WTC Final Oct 2033: Champions Trophy	—N/a	2032–2035	TBA
TBA	2033–2035 WTC	Jul – Aug 2034: T20 World Cup	—N/a	2032–2035	TBA
TBA	TBA	Jun 2035: WTC Final Oct – Nov 2035: Cricket World Cup	—N/a	2032–2035	TBA

=== Women's tournaments ===
Tournaments included in the ICC Women's Future Tour Programme
FTP	Championship (Note: Edition of the ICC Women's Championship, which spans across four years, made up of bilateral women's One Day International (WODI) events included in the FTP and serves as part of the women's Cricket World Cup qualification pathway.)	ICC events & hosts	Other events	Events cycle	Hosts cycle
2022–2025	2022–2025	Jul – Aug 2022: Cricket World Cup	Oct 2022: Twenty20 Asia Cup	—N/a	
2022–2025	2022–2025	Feb 2023: T20 World Cup; South Africa	—N/a	—N/a	
2022–2025	2022–2025	Sep – Oct 2024: T20 World Cup; Bangladesh (later moved to UAE)	—N/a	2024–2027	2024–2027
2025–2029	2025–2029	Oct 2025: Cricket World Cup; India	—N/a	2024–2027	2024–2027
2025–2029	2025–2029	Jun – Jul 2026: T20 World Cup; England	Sep – Oct 2026: Twenty20 Asia Cup	2024–2027	2024–2027
2025–2029	2025–2029	Jun – Jul 2027: Champions Trophy; Sri Lanka (later brought forward to February and moved to India)	—N/a	2024–2027	2024–2027
2025–2029	2025–2029	Jul 2028: Summer Olympics; Los Angeles Sep 2028: T20 World Cup; Pakistan	Jun 2028: Twenty20 Asia Cup	2028–2031	TBA
TBA	TBA	2029 Women's Cricket World Cup	—N/a	2028–2031	TBA

=== Under-19 tournaments ===
Under-19 ICC tournaments
Year	ICC events & hosts	Events cycle	Hosts cycle
2024	Jan – Feb 2024: Men's Cricket World Cup; Sri Lanka (later moved to South Africa)	2024–2027	2024–2027
2025	Jan – Feb 2025: Women's T20 World Cup; Malaysia & Thailand (later only Malaysia)	2024–2027	2024–2027
2026	Jan – Feb 2026: Men's Cricket World Cup; Zimbabwe & Namibia	2024–2027	2024–2027
2027	Jan – Feb 2027: Women's T20 World Cup; Bangladesh & Nepal	2024–2027	2024–2027
