= Sankara Dendapani =

Indian cricket umpire (born 1958)

Personal information
- Born: 12 January 1958 (age 68); Ernakulam, India

Umpiring information
- ODIs umpired: 1 (1998)
- Source: Cricinfo, 18 May 2014

Sankara Lingam Dendapani (born 12 January 1958) is a former Indian cricket umpire. Umpiring mainly at the first-class level, he only officiated in one international fixture, a One Day International, in 1998.

== See also ==
- List of One Day International cricket umpires
