= List of Champions Trophy centuries =

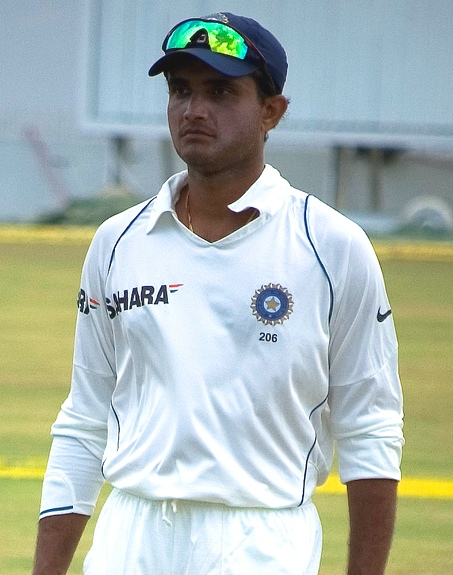
Sourav Ganguly was the first player to score three centuries in the tournament's history.

In cricket, a player is said to have scored a century when he scores 100 or more runs in a single innings. The ICC Champions Trophy is a One Day International (ODI) tournament organised by the International Cricket Council (ICC), and is considered the second most significant after the World Cup. Originally inaugurated as the "ICC KnockOut Trophy" in 1998, the tournament is organised every four years, though it had been organised every two or three years before, and was not held in 2021. A total of 64 centuries have been scored by players from 11 different teams. Players from all teams that have permanent ODI status have scored centuries. (Note: The teams are Australia, Bangladesh, England, India, New Zealand, Pakistan, South Africa, Sri Lanka, West Indies and Zimbabwe.) India leads the list, with 12 centuries, followed by New Zealand and South Africa with eight each.

Alistair Campbell of Zimbabwe was the first to score a century in the tournament, when he made 100 against New Zealand during the inaugural edition. Four players—Sourav Ganguly (India), Herschelle Gibbs (South Africa), Chris Gayle (West Indies) and Shikhar Dhawan (India)—hold the record for the most number of centuries, with three each. A further seven players—Saeed Anwar (Pakistan), Marcus Trescothick and Joe Root (England), Upul Tharanga (Sri Lanka), Shane Watson (Australia), Rachin Ravindra and Kane Williamson (New Zealand)—have each scored two centuries. Gayle's three centuries in 2006 is a record for any player in a single edition. Afghanistan's Ibrahim Zadran holds the record for the highest individual score, scoring 177 against England in 2025. South Africa's Jacques Kallis's 113 not out against Sri Lanka in 1998, Ganguly's 141 not out against South Africa in 2000, and New Zealand's Chris Cairns's 102 not out against India in the same tournament feature in the top 100 ODI innings of all time by a list released by the Wisden Cricketers' Almanack in 2002.

Six centuries were made in the finals, with three of them resulting in the centurions being on the championship winning side. The 2025 edition saw fourteen centuries, the highest for a single tournament, while the fewest centuries were scored in the 2013 edition, with three.

== Key ==
Key
Symbol	Meaning
Player	The batsman who scored the century
Runs	Number of runs scored
*	Batsman remained not out
†	The century was scored in the final
Balls	Number of balls faced
4s	Number of fours scored
6s	Number of sixes scored
S/R	Strike rate (runs scored per 100 balls)
Inn	Innings in which the score was made
Team	The cricket team the batsman was representing
Opposition	The team the batsman was playing against
Venue	The ODI cricket ground where the match was played
Date	The date when the match was played
D/L	The result was decided by the Duckworth–Lewis method

== Centuries ==
List of ICC champions trophy centuries
No.	Player	Runs	Balls	4s	6s	S/R	Inn	Team	Opposition	Venue	Date	Result	Ref
1	Alistair Campbell	100	143	7	1	69.93	1	Zimbabwe	New Zealand	Bangabandhu National Stadium, Dhaka	24 October 1998	Lost	
2	Sachin Tendulkar	141	128	13	3	110.15	1	India	Australia	Bangabandhu National Stadium, Dhaka	28 October 1998	Won	
3	Jacques Kallis	113*	100	5	5	113.00	1	South Africa	Sri Lanka	Bangabandhu National Stadium, Dhaka	30 October 1998	Won	
4	Philo Wallace	103 †	102	11	5	100.98	1	West Indies	South Africa	Bangabandhu National Stadium, Dhaka	1 November 1998	Lost	
5	Avishka Gunawardene	132	146	19	0	90.41	1	Sri Lanka	West Indies	Gymkhana Club Ground, Nairobi	4 October 2000	Won	
6	Saeed Anwar (1/2)	105*	134	12	1	78.35	2	Pakistan	Sri Lanka	Gymkhana Club Ground, Nairobi	8 October 2000	Won	
7	Saeed Anwar (2/2)	104	115	16	0	90.43	1	Pakistan	New Zealand	Gymkhana Club Ground, Nairobi	11 October 2000	Lost	
8	Sourav Ganguly (1/3)	141*	142	11	6	99.29	1	India	South Africa	Gymkhana Club Ground, Nairobi	13 October 2000	Won	
9	Sourav Ganguly (2/3)	117 †	130	9	4	90.00	1	India	New Zealand	Gymkhana Club Ground, Nairobi	15 October 2000	Lost	
10	Chris Cairns	102* †	113	8	2	90.26	2	New Zealand	India	Gymkhana Club Ground, Nairobi	15 October 2000	Won	
11	Sanath Jayasuriya	102*	120	10	0	85.00	2	Sri Lanka	Pakistan	R. Premadasa Stadium, Colombo	12 September 2002	Won	
12	Mohammad Kaif	111*	112	8	1	99.10	1	India	Zimbabwe	R. Premadasa Stadium, Colombo	14 September 2002	Won	
13	Andy Flower	145	164	13	0	88.41	2	Zimbabwe	India	R. Premadasa Stadium, Colombo	14 September 2002	Lost	
14	Marvan Atapattu	101	118	8	0	85.59	1	Sri Lanka	Netherlands	R. Premadasa Stadium, Colombo	16 September 2002	Won	
15	Brian Lara	111	120	8	2	92.50	1	West Indies	Kenya	Singhalese Sports Club Cricket Ground, Colombo	17 September 2002	Won	
16	Marcus Trescothick (1/2)	119	102	11	2	116.66	1	England	Zimbabwe	R. Premadasa Stadium, Colombo	18 September 2002	Won	
17	Herschelle Gibbs (1/3)	116	126	13	3	92.06	1	South Africa	Kenya	R. Premadasa Stadium, Colombo	20 September 2002	Won	
18	Virender Sehwag	126	104	21	1	121.15	2	India	England	R. Premadasa Stadium, Colombo	22 September 2002	Won	
19	Sourav Ganguly (3/3)	117*	109	12	3	107.33	2	India	England	R. Premadasa Stadium, Colombo	22 September 2002	Won	
20	Herschelle Gibbs (2/3)	116*	119	16	0	97.47	2	South Africa	India	R. Premadasa Stadium, Colombo	25 September 2002	Lost	
21	Nathan Astle	145*	151	13	6	96.02	1	New Zealand	United States	The Oval, London	10 September 2004	Won	
22	Andrew Flintoff	104	91	9	3	114.28	1	England	Sri Lanka	The Rose Bowl, Southampton	17 September 2004 (Note: Rain ended play on 17 September, so the reserve day of 18 September was used to finish the match.)	Won (D/L)	
23	Herschelle Gibbs (3/3)	101	135	9	1	74.81	1	South Africa	West Indies	The Oval, London	18 September 2004 (Note: Rain ended play on 18 September, so the reserve day of 19 September was used to finish the match.)	Lost	
24	Marcus Trescothick (2/2)	104 †	124	14	0	83.87	1	England	West Indies	The Oval, London	25 September 2004	Lost	
25	Upul Tharanga (1/2)	105	129	11	1	81.39	1	Sri Lanka	Bangladesh	Inderjit Singh Bindra Stadium, Mohali	7 October 2006	Won	
26	Upul Tharanga (2/2)	110	130	13	1	84.61	1	Sri Lanka	Zimbabwe	Sardar Patel Stadium, Ahmedabad	10 October 2006	Won	
27	Chris Gayle (1/3)	104*	118	11	3	88.13	2	West Indies	Bangladesh	Sawai Mansingh Stadium, Jaipur	11 October 2006	Won	
28	Shahriar Nafees	123*	161	17	1	76.39	1	Bangladesh	Zimbabwe	Sawai Mansingh Stadium, Jaipur	13 October 2006	Won	
29	Chris Gayle (2/3)	101	128	10	1	78.90	1	West Indies	England	Sardar Patel Stadium, Ahmedabad	28 October 2006	Lost	
30	Dwayne Bravo	112*	124	14	1	90.32	1	West Indies	England	Sardar Patel Stadium, Ahmedabad	28 October 2006	Lost	
31	Chris Gayle (3/3)	133*	135	17	3	98.51	2	West Indies	South Africa	Sawai Mansingh Stadium, Jaipur	2 November 2006	Won	
32	Tillakaratne Dilshan	106	92	16	1	115.21	1	Sri Lanka	South Africa	SuperSport Park, Centurion	22 September 2009	Won (D/L)	
33	Shoaib Malik	128	126	16	0	101.58	1	Pakistan	India	SuperSport Park, Centurion	26 September 2009	Won	
34	Graeme Smith	141	134	16	0	105.22	2	South Africa	England	SuperSport Park, Centurion	27 September 2009	Lost	
35	Shane Watson (1/2)	136*	132	10	7	103.03	2	Australia	England	SuperSport Park, Centurion	2 October 2009	Won	
36	Ricky Ponting	111*	115	12	1	96.52	2	Australia	England	SuperSport Park, Centurion	2 October 2009	Won	
37	Shane Watson (2/2)	105* †	129	10	4	81.39	2	Australia	New Zealand	SuperSport Park, Centurion	5 October 2009	Won	
38	Shikhar Dhawan (1/3)	114	94	12	1	121.27	1	India	South Africa	Sophia Gardens, Cardiff	6 June 2013	Won	
39	Shikhar Dhawan (2/3)	102*	107	10	1	95.32	2	India	West Indies	The Oval, London	11 June 2013	Won	
40	Kumar Sangakkara	134*	135	12	0	99.25	2	Sri Lanka	England	The Oval, London	13 June 2013	Won	
41	Tamim Iqbal	128	142	12	3	90.14	1	Bangladesh	England	The Oval, London	1 June 2017	Lost	
42	Joe Root (1/2)	133*	129	11	1	103.10	2	England	Bangladesh	The Oval, London	1 June 2017	Won	
43	Kane Williamson (1/2)	100	97	8	3	103.09	1	New Zealand	Australia	Edgbaston, Birmingham	2 June 2017	No result	
44	Hashim Amla	103	115	5	2	89.56	1	South Africa	Sri Lanka	The Oval, London	3 June 2017	Won	
45	Shikhar Dhawan (3/3)	125	128	15	1	97.65	1	India	Sri Lanka	The Oval, London	8 June 2017	Lost	
46	Shakib Al Hasan	114	115	11	1	99.13	2	Bangladesh	New Zealand	Sophia Gardens, Cardiff	9 June 2017	Won	
47	Mahmudullah	102*	107	8	2	95.32	2	Bangladesh	New Zealand	Sophia Gardens, Cardiff	9 June 2017	Won	
48	Ben Stokes	102*	109	13	2	93.57	2	England	Australia	Edgbaston, Birmingham	10 June 2017	Won (D/L)	
49	Rohit Sharma	123*	129	15	1	95.34	2	India	Bangladesh	Edgbaston, Birmingham	15 June 2017	Won	
50	Fakhar Zaman	114 †	106	12	3	107.54	1	Pakistan	India	The Oval, London	18 June 2017	Won	
51	Will Young	107	113	12	1	94.69	1	New Zealand	Pakistan	National Stadium, Karachi	19 February 2025	Won	
52	Tom Latham	118*	104	10	3	113.46	1	New Zealand	Pakistan	National Stadium, Karachi	19 February 2025	Won	
53	Towhid Hridoy	100	118	6	2	84.74	1	Bangladesh	India	Dubai International Cricket Stadium, Dubai	20 February 2025	Lost	
54	Shubman Gill	101*	129	9	2	78.29	2	India	Bangladesh	Dubai International Cricket Stadium, Dubai	20 February 2025	Won	
55	Ryan Rickelton	103	106	7	1	97.16	1	South Africa	Afghanistan	National Stadium, Karachi	21 February 2025	Won	
56	Ben Duckett	165	143	17	3	115.38	1	England	Australia	Gaddafi Stadium, Lahore	22 February 2025	Lost	
57	Josh Inglis	120*	86	8	6	139.53	2	Australia	England	Gaddafi Stadium, Lahore	22 February 2025	Won	
58	Virat Kohli	100*	111	7	0	90.09	2	India	Pakistan	Dubai International Cricket Stadium, Dubai	23 February 2025	Won	
59	Rachin Ravindra (1/2)	112	105	12	1	106.66	2	New Zealand	Bangladesh	Rawalpindi Cricket Stadium, Rawalpindi	24 February 2025	Won	
60	Ibrahim Zadran	177	146	12	6	121.23	1	Afghanistan	England	Gaddafi Stadium, Lahore	26 February 2025	Won	
61	Joe Root (2/2)	120	111	11	1	108.10	2	England	Afghanistan	Gaddafi Stadium, Lahore	26 February 2025	Lost	
62	Rachin Ravindra (2/2)	108	101	13	1	106.93	1	New Zealand	South Africa	Gaddafi Stadium, Lahore	5 March 2025	Won	
63	Kane Williamson (2/2)	102	94	10	2	108.51	1	New Zealand	South Africa	Gaddafi Stadium, Lahore	5 March 2025	Won	
64	David Miller	100*	67	10	4	149.25	2	South Africa	New Zealand	Gaddafi Stadium, Lahore	5 March 2025	Lost	

== Bibliography ==
- Knight, Julian (2013). Cricket For Dummies. John Wiley & Sons. ISBN 978-1-118-48034-2.
- Stern, John; Williams, Marcus (2014). The Essential Wisden: An Anthology of 150 Years of Wisden Cricketers' Almanack. A & C Black. ISBN 978-1-4081-7896-6.
