= R. Nagarajan =

Indian cricket umpire (born 1953)

Personal information
- Born: 14 August 1953 (age 73)

Umpiring information
- ODIs umpired: 1 (1998)
- Source: Cricinfo, 26 May 2014

R. Nagarajan (born 14 August 1953) is a former Indian cricket umpire. The only time he officiated in an international match was in a single ODI game, in 1998.

== See also ==
- List of One Day International cricket umpires
