= Cricket at the Pan American Games =

- No. of events: 2

Cricket is set to be a part of the Pan American Games for the first time in 2027.

== History ==
The sport's inclusion into the sport was pegged by multiple regional cricket officials and Cricket West Indies (CWI), who have publicly advocated for cricket's growth in the Americas. In March 2025, a high-level delegation led by CWI President Dr. Kishore Shallow met with multiple Peruvian Olympic Committee members in a bid for cricket's inclusion at the 2027 Games. Previously, Panam Sports President Neven Ilic had said that addition of new Olympic games–including cricket–would be difficult considering they are "not deeply developed in our region". In June, following a Panam Sports Executive Board meeting, cricket was officially included in the list of 36 sports to be played in 2027.

== Men's tournament ==
Year	Host	Gold	Silver	Bronze	Fourth place
2027; Details	(Peru); Lima				

== Women's tournament ==
Year	Host	Gold	Silver	Bronze	Fourth place
2027; Details	(Peru); Lima				

== Medal table ==
Cricket (2027)
Rank	Nation	Gold	Silver	Bronze	Total
Totals (0 entries)		0	0	0	0

== Participating nations ==
Nation	2027	Years
