= 2027 ICC Women's Champions Trophy =

Inaugural edition of the ICC Women's Champions Trophy

- Dates: 14 – 28 February 2027
- Administrator: International Cricket Council
- Cricket format: Women's Twenty20 International
- Tournament format(s): Round-robin and final
- Host: India
- Participants: 6
- Matches: 16

The 2027 ICC Women's Champions Trophy will be the inaugural edition of the ICC Women's Champions Trophy. It will be hosted by the Board of Control for Cricket in India from 14 to 28 February 2027. Six teams will compete in 16 matches across two venues in India. The top five teams from the ICC Women's T20I Team Rankings, along with the hosts, qualified for the tournament.

== Background ==
The ICC Women's Champions Trophy is an upcoming quadrennial international cricket competition in Women's Twenty20 International (WT20I) format, organised by the International Cricket Council (ICC). In July 2022, as part of the 2024–2027 ICC women's hosts cycle, the ICC announced that a Women's Champions Trophy will be introduced from 2027 onwards.

=== Host selection ===
As part of the 2024–2027 women's hosts cycle, the ICC initially announced that the tournament would be played in Sri Lanka. In August 2026, Sri Lanka Cricket (SLC) was stripped of the hosting rights due to government interference in the board. A few days later, Board of Control for Cricket in India (BCCI) was awarded the hosting rights, with the tournament scheduled to be held across two venues.

=== Format ===
In the first round, each team will play every other team once in a round-robin format. The top two teams will advance to the knockout stage, which includes the final match.

=== Schedule ===
In the 2025–2029 ICC Women's Future Tours Programme, the tournament was scheduled to be held in June–July 2026. In June 2026, the ICC announced that the tournament would instead take place from 14 to 28 February 2027.

=== Marketing ===
In November 2024, the ICC revealed a new visual identity for the Champions Trophy tournaments.

== Qualification ==
Sri Lanka had originally qualified as the hosts, but after the hosting rights were transferred from SLC to BCCI, India replaced them as the host team. The next five teams from the ICC Women's T20I Team Rankings at the end of 2026 Women's T20 World Cup: Australia, England, New Zealand, South Africa and Sri Lanka qualified for the tournament.

Teams qualified for the tournament
| Method of qualification | No. of teams | Date of qualification | Teams |
|---|---|---|---|
| Hosts | 1 | —N/a | India |
| ICC Women's T20I Team Rankings | 5 | 6 July 2026 | Australia |
| ICC Women's T20I Team Rankings | 5 | 6 July 2026 | England |
| ICC Women's T20I Team Rankings | 5 | 6 July 2026 | New Zealand |
| ICC Women's T20I Team Rankings | 5 | 6 July 2026 | South Africa |
| ICC Women's T20I Team Rankings | 5 | 6 July 2026 | Sri Lanka |
| Total | 6 | | |

== Venues ==
In September 2026, the ICC announced the two venues for the tournament matches: Brabourne Stadium in Mumbai and Baroda Cricket Association Stadium in Vadodara.

Venues in India
A map of India with pin-points on 2027 ICC Women's Champions Trophy venues
| Mumbai | Vadodara |
| Brabourne Stadium | BCA Stadium |
| Capacity: 50,000 | Capacity: 40,000 |
| Matches: TBA | Matches: TBA |
| Brabourne Stadium in 2010 | Baroda Cricket Association Stadium in 2025 |

== First round ==
=== Points table ===
First round standings
| Pos | Team | Pld | W | L | NR | Pts | NRR | Qualification |
|---|---|---|---|---|---|---|---|---|
| 1 | Australia | 0 | 0 | 0 | 0 | 0 | — | Advance to the final |
| 2 | England | 0 | 0 | 0 | 0 | 0 | — | Advance to the final |
| 3 | India (H) | 0 | 0 | 0 | 0 | 0 | — | |
| 4 | New Zealand | 0 | 0 | 0 | 0 | 0 | — | |
| 5 | South Africa | 0 | 0 | 0 | 0 | 0 | — | |
| 6 | Sri Lanka | 0 | 0 | 0 | 0 | 0 | — | |

First match(es) will be played: 14 February 2027. Source: Cricinfo
Rules for classification: 1) Points; 2) Wins; 3) Net run rate; 4) Results of games between tied teams; 5) WT20I Rankings ahead of the tournament
(H) Hosts

== Knockout stage ==
=== Final ===
Final
28 February 2027

| 1st placed team | v | 2nd placed team |
